= 2024 European Women's Handball Championship qualification =

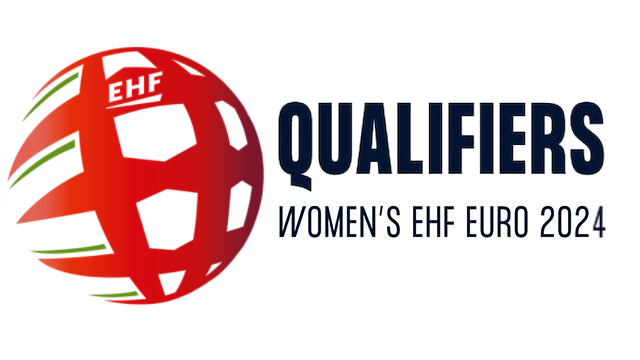
Logo

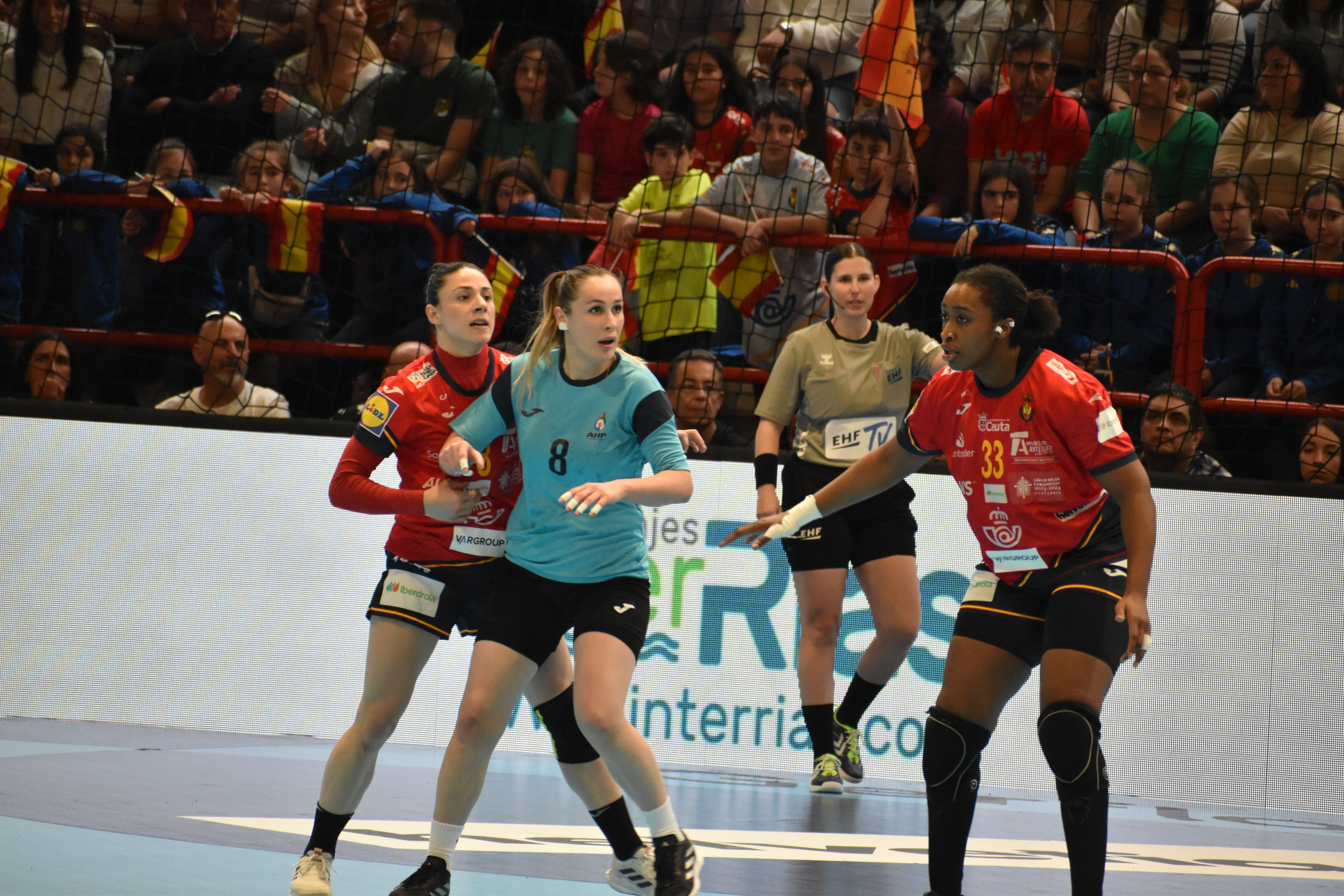
Spain - Azerbaijan match.

This article describes the qualification for the 2024 European Women's Handball Championship.

== Qualification system ==
31 teams registered for participation and competed for 20 places at the final tournament. Great Britain withdraw late which would have been the 32nd team. The teams were drawn into seven groups of four and one group with three teams. It was later confirmed that Great Britain withdrew because no round 1 was played as planned. Thus, Great Britain, couldn't afford to participate in the home and away round 2. The top-two placed teams in each group qualified for the final tournament, alongside the four best-ranked third-placed teams, not counting the matches against fourth-placed teams.

== Draw ==
The draw took place on 20 April 2023.

=== Seeding ===
The seeding was announced on 14 April 2023.

Pot 1	Pot 2	Pot 3	Pot 4
France; Denmark; Germany; Netherlands; Sweden; Spain; Montenegro; Croatia	Romania; Slovenia; Serbia; Poland; Czech Republic; North Macedonia; Slovakia; Iceland	Portugal; Ukraine; Turkey; Italy; Faroe Islands; Lithuania; Greece; Kosovo	Israel; Finland; Luxembourg; Bosnia and Herzegovina; Latvia; Azerbaijan; Bulgaria

== Groups ==
All times are UTC+2 (except for February and March, those are UTC+1).

=== Group 1 ===
Pos	Team	Pld	W	D	L	GF	GA	GD	Pts	Qualification
1	Romania	6	6	0	0	200	125	+75	12	Final tournament
2	Croatia	6	4	0	2	167	122	+45	8	Final tournament
3	Greece	6	2	0	4	130	164	−34	4	
4	Bosnia and Herzegovina	6	0	0	6	115	201	−86	0	

Source: EHF
Rules for classification: 1) points; 2) head-to-head points; 3) head-to-head goal difference; 4) head-to-head number of goals scored; 5) goal difference.

11 October 2023; 16:30	Romania	49–18	Bosnia and Herzegovina	Sala Sporturilor Mioveni, Mioveni; Attendance: 1,700; Referees: Bočáková, Jánošíková (SVK)
11 October 2023; 16:30	Laslo 7	(26–11)	three players 5	Sala Sporturilor Mioveni, Mioveni; Attendance: 1,700; Referees: Bočáková, Jánošíková (SVK)
11 October 2023; 16:30	1× (yellow card)	Report	1× (yellow card) 3× (suspension)	Sala Sporturilor Mioveni, Mioveni; Attendance: 1,700; Referees: Bočáková, Jánošíková (SVK)

11 October 2023; 18:00	Croatia	32–22	Greece	SŠD Mladost, Karlovac; Attendance: 2,200; Referees: Sekulić, Jovandić (SRB)
11 October 2023; 18:00	Pavlović 5	(17–8)	Andritsou 6	SŠD Mladost, Karlovac; Attendance: 2,200; Referees: Sekulić, Jovandić (SRB)
11 October 2023; 18:00	1× (yellow card) 3× (suspension)	Report	4× (suspension)	SŠD Mladost, Karlovac; Attendance: 2,200; Referees: Sekulić, Jovandić (SRB)

14 October 2023; 17:00	Greece	20–32	Romania	Municipal Sports Center Lefkovrisi, Kozani; Attendance: 500; Referees: Rauchs, Linster (LUX)
14 October 2023; 17:00	Chatziparasidou, Zygoura 4	(8–15)	Dindiligan 5	Municipal Sports Center Lefkovrisi, Kozani; Attendance: 500; Referees: Rauchs, Linster (LUX)
14 October 2023; 17:00	1× (yellow card) 4× (suspension)	Report	3× (suspension)	Municipal Sports Center Lefkovrisi, Kozani; Attendance: 500; Referees: Rauchs, Linster (LUX)

14 October 2023; 20:00	Bosnia and Herzegovina	17–31	Croatia	Sportski centar Salih Omerčević, Cazin; Attendance: 1,555; Referees: Ilieva, Karbeska (MKD)
14 October 2023; 20:00	Isić, Vrančić 4	(6–12)	three players 5	Sportski centar Salih Omerčević, Cazin; Attendance: 1,555; Referees: Ilieva, Karbeska (MKD)
14 October 2023; 20:00	1× (yellow card) 2× (suspension)	Report	4× (suspension)	Sportski centar Salih Omerčević, Cazin; Attendance: 1,555; Referees: Ilieva, Karbeska (MKD)

28 February 2024; 16:30	Romania	26–24	Croatia	TeraPlast Arena, Bistrița; Attendance: 3,007; Referees: Backović, Palačković (SLO)
28 February 2024; 16:30	Ostase 9	(13–11)	Birtić, Prkačin 5	TeraPlast Arena, Bistrița; Attendance: 3,007; Referees: Backović, Palačković (SLO)
28 February 2024; 16:30	2× (yellow card) 4× (suspension)	Report	1× (yellow card) 3× (suspension)	TeraPlast Arena, Bistrița; Attendance: 3,007; Referees: Backović, Palačković (SLO)

28 February 2024; 19:00	Bosnia and Herzegovina	22–24	Greece	Ju Centar Za Obrazovanje Kulturu I Sport, Cazin; Attendance: 1,700; Referees: Klompers, Stobbe (NED)
28 February 2024; 19:00	Kolasinac 7	(8–12)	Chatziparasidou 8	Ju Centar Za Obrazovanje Kulturu I Sport, Cazin; Attendance: 1,700; Referees: Klompers, Stobbe (NED)
28 February 2024; 19:00	1× (yellow card) 7× (suspension)	Report	2× (yellow card) 2× (suspension)	Ju Centar Za Obrazovanje Kulturu I Sport, Cazin; Attendance: 1,700; Referees: Klompers, Stobbe (NED)

3 March 2024; 16:00	Greece	27–23	Bosnia and Herzegovina	Municipal Sports Center Lefkovrisi, Kozani; Attendance: 1,200; Referees: Peretz, Schwartz (ISR)
3 March 2024; 16:00	Kerlidi 9	(11–8)	Isić 5	Municipal Sports Center Lefkovrisi, Kozani; Attendance: 1,200; Referees: Peretz, Schwartz (ISR)
3 March 2024; 16:00	1× (yellow card) 4× (suspension)	Report	1× (yellow card) 6× (suspension)	Municipal Sports Center Lefkovrisi, Kozani; Attendance: 1,200; Referees: Peretz, Schwartz (ISR)

3 March 2024; 17:00	Croatia	23–25	Romania	ŠSD "Josip Samaržija-Bepo", Koprivnica; Attendance: 1,200; Referees: Doychinov, Goretsov (BUL)
3 March 2024; 17:00	Šimara 6	(11–11)	Seraficeanu 6	ŠSD "Josip Samaržija-Bepo", Koprivnica; Attendance: 1,200; Referees: Doychinov, Goretsov (BUL)
3 March 2024; 17:00	1× (suspension)	Report	1× (yellow card) 4× (suspension)	ŠSD "Josip Samaržija-Bepo", Koprivnica; Attendance: 1,200; Referees: Doychinov, Goretsov (BUL)

3 April 2024; 17:00	Greece	13–24	Croatia	Municipal Sports Center Lefkovrisi, Kozani; Attendance: 650; Referees: Sirbu, Serdiuc (MDA)
3 April 2024; 17:00	Zygoura 4	(10–9)	Ježić 5	Municipal Sports Center Lefkovrisi, Kozani; Attendance: 650; Referees: Sirbu, Serdiuc (MDA)
3 April 2024; 17:00	1× (yellow card) 3× (suspension)	Report	4× (suspension)	Municipal Sports Center Lefkovrisi, Kozani; Attendance: 650; Referees: Sirbu, Serdiuc (MDA)

4 April 2024; 20:00	Bosnia and Herzegovina	16–37	Romania	Sports Hall Cazin, Cazin; Attendance: 1,000; Referees: Me. Ilievski, Mi. Ilievski (MKD)
4 April 2024; 20:00	Isić 4	(8–17)	Bazaliu 8	Sports Hall Cazin, Cazin; Attendance: 1,000; Referees: Me. Ilievski, Mi. Ilievski (MKD)
4 April 2024; 20:00	4× (suspension)	Report	1× (yellow card) 3× (suspension)	Sports Hall Cazin, Cazin; Attendance: 1,000; Referees: Me. Ilievski, Mi. Ilievski (MKD)

7 April 2024; 18:00	Croatia	33–19	Bosnia and Herzegovina	Športska dvorana Sutinska vrela, Zagreb; Attendance: 1,000; Referees: Charalambous, Efstathiou (CYP)
7 April 2024; 18:00	Mamić 5	(17–8)	Isić 5	Športska dvorana Sutinska vrela, Zagreb; Attendance: 1,000; Referees: Charalambous, Efstathiou (CYP)
7 April 2024; 18:00	1× (yellow card) 3× (suspension)	Report	1× (suspension)	Športska dvorana Sutinska vrela, Zagreb; Attendance: 1,000; Referees: Charalambous, Efstathiou (CYP)

7 April 2024; 18:00	Romania	31–24	Greece	Sala Sporturilor „Romeo Iamandi”, Buzău; Attendance: 1,800; Referees: Oyarzun, Zaragüeta (ESP)
7 April 2024; 18:00	Stoica 7	(14–14)	Andritsou 6	Sala Sporturilor „Romeo Iamandi”, Buzău; Attendance: 1,800; Referees: Oyarzun, Zaragüeta (ESP)
7 April 2024; 18:00	2× (suspension)	Report		Sala Sporturilor „Romeo Iamandi”, Buzău; Attendance: 1,800; Referees: Oyarzun, Zaragüeta (ESP)

=== Group 2 ===
Pos	Team	Pld	W	D	L	GF	GA	GD	Pts	Qualification
1	Germany	6	6	0	0	227	102	+125	12	Final tournament
2	Ukraine	6	3	1	2	155	174	−19	7	Final tournament
3	Slovakia	6	2	1	3	147	168	−21	5	Final tournament
4	Israel	6	0	0	6	122	207	−85	0	

Source: EHF
Rules for classification: 1) points; 2) head-to-head points; 3) head-to-head goal difference; 4) head-to-head number of goals scored; 5) goal difference.

12 October 2023; 20:15	Germany	31–24	Ukraine	Buderus Arena, Wetzlar; Attendance: 3,423; Referees: Ivanauskas, Jencevičius (LTU)
12 October 2023; 20:15	Grijseels 8	(15–14)	Smbatian 6	Buderus Arena, Wetzlar; Attendance: 3,423; Referees: Ivanauskas, Jencevičius (LTU)
12 October 2023; 20:15	1× (yellow card) 4× (suspension)	Report	7× (suspension)	Buderus Arena, Wetzlar; Attendance: 3,423; Referees: Ivanauskas, Jencevičius (LTU)

15 October 2023; 17:00	Ukraine	25–20	Slovakia	Hala Widowiskowo-Sportowa w Mielcu, Mielec, Poland (Note: Due to the Russian invasion of Ukraine, the Ukrainian team plays their home matches at neutral venues.); Attendance: 300; Referees: Backović, Palačković (SLO)
15 October 2023; 17:00	Dmytryshyn, Naumenko 5	(14–9)	four players 3	Hala Widowiskowo-Sportowa w Mielcu, Mielec, Poland; Attendance: 300; Referees: Backović, Palačković (SLO)
15 October 2023; 17:00	2× (yellow card) 5× (suspension)	Report	1× (yellow card) 4× (suspension)	Hala Widowiskowo-Sportowa w Mielcu, Mielec, Poland; Attendance: 300; Referees: Backović, Palačković (SLO)

28 February 2024 (Note: Due to the 2023 Gaza war, the matches of Israel were postponed.); 18:00	Slovakia	31–22	Israel	Mestská športová Hall, Šaľa; Attendance: 1,500; Referees: Fabryczny, Rawicki (POL)
28 February 2024; 18:00	Lancz 9	(16–9)	Shaul 8	Mestská športová Hall, Šaľa; Attendance: 1,500; Referees: Fabryczny, Rawicki (POL)
28 February 2024; 18:00	1× (suspension)	Report	5× (suspension)	Mestská športová Hall, Šaľa; Attendance: 1,500; Referees: Fabryczny, Rawicki (POL)

29 February 2024; 18:00	Slovakia	18–40	Germany	Mestská športová Hall, Šaľa; Attendance: 1,500; Referees: Altmár, Horváth (HUN)
29 February 2024; 18:00	Lancz, Szarková 4	(8–20)	Döll, Grijseels 8	Mestská športová Hall, Šaľa; Attendance: 1,500; Referees: Altmár, Horváth (HUN)
29 February 2024; 18:00	1× (suspension)	Report	3× (suspension)	Mestská športová Hall, Šaľa; Attendance: 1,500; Referees: Altmár, Horváth (HUN)

29 February 2024; 20:30	Israel	27–28	Ukraine	Mestská športová Hall, Šaľa, Slovakia (Note: Due to the 2023 Gaza war, the Israeli team plays their home matches at neutral venues.); Attendance: 150; Referees: Fabryczny, Rawicki (POL)
29 February 2024; 20:30	Vakrat 8	(13–14)	Horilska 8	Mestská športová Hall, Šaľa, Slovakia; Attendance: 150; Referees: Fabryczny, Rawicki (POL)
29 February 2024; 20:30	2× (yellow card) 5× (suspension)	Report	6× (suspension)	Mestská športová Hall, Šaľa, Slovakia; Attendance: 150; Referees: Fabryczny, Rawicki (POL)

2 March 2024; 18:00	Ukraine	32–28	Israel	Mestská športová Hall, Šaľa, Slovakia; Attendance: 150; Referees: Altmár, Horváth (HUN)
2 March 2024; 18:00	Soskyda 5	(19–14)	Vakrat 7	Mestská športová Hall, Šaľa, Slovakia; Attendance: 150; Referees: Altmár, Horváth (HUN)
2 March 2024; 18:00	5× (suspension)	Report	4× (suspension)	Mestská športová Hall, Šaľa, Slovakia; Attendance: 150; Referees: Altmár, Horváth (HUN)

3 March 2024; 18:15	Germany	32–18	Slovakia	Mitsubishi Electric Halle, Düsseldorf; Attendance: 3,011; Referees: Hatipoğlu, Şimşek (TUR)
3 March 2024; 18:15	Behrend, Hauf 4	(17–7)	Lancz 5	Mitsubishi Electric Halle, Düsseldorf; Attendance: 3,011; Referees: Hatipoğlu, Şimşek (TUR)
3 March 2024; 18:15	2× (yellow card) 3× (suspension)	Report	2× (suspension)	Mitsubishi Electric Halle, Düsseldorf; Attendance: 3,011; Referees: Hatipoğlu, Şimşek (TUR)

4 April 2024; 16:30	Israel	24–35	Slovakia	SNP Dome, Heidelberg, Germany; Attendance: 1,106; Referees: Fremstad, Jørstad (NOR)
4 April 2024; 16:30	three players 4	(14–20)	Holejová 7	SNP Dome, Heidelberg, Germany; Attendance: 1,106; Referees: Fremstad, Jørstad (NOR)
4 April 2024; 16:30		Report	1× (suspension) 1× (red card)	SNP Dome, Heidelberg, Germany; Attendance: 1,106; Referees: Fremstad, Jørstad (NOR)

4 April 2024; 19:00	Ukraine	21–43	Germany	SNP Dome, Heidelberg, Germany; Attendance: 1,207; Referees: Hansen, Jensen (DEN)
4 April 2024; 19:00	Smbatian 5	(11–23)	Ossenkopp 6	SNP Dome, Heidelberg, Germany; Attendance: 1,207; Referees: Hansen, Jensen (DEN)
4 April 2024; 19:00	1× (red card)	Report	1× (yellow card)	SNP Dome, Heidelberg, Germany; Attendance: 1,207; Referees: Hansen, Jensen (DEN)

6 April 2024; 17:00	Israel	12–35	Germany	SNP Dome, Heidelberg, Germany; Attendance: 1,323; Referees: Weber, Weinquin (LUX)
6 April 2024; 17:00	Teplitsky 4	(7–18)	Behrend 5	SNP Dome, Heidelberg, Germany; Attendance: 1,323; Referees: Weber, Weinquin (LUX)
6 April 2024; 17:00	1× (suspension)	Report		SNP Dome, Heidelberg, Germany; Attendance: 1,323; Referees: Weber, Weinquin (LUX)

7 April 2024; 18:00	Germany	46–9	Israel	SNP Dome, Heidelberg; Attendance: 1,121; Referees: Weber, Weinquin (LUX)
7 April 2024; 18:00	Smits 7	(23–4)	Gerbi 3	SNP Dome, Heidelberg; Attendance: 1,121; Referees: Weber, Weinquin (LUX)
7 April 2024; 18:00	1× (suspension)	Report	1× (suspension)	SNP Dome, Heidelberg; Attendance: 1,121; Referees: Weber, Weinquin (LUX)

7 April 2024; 18:00	Slovakia	25–25	Ukraine	Mestská športová Hall, Šaľa; Attendance: 1,700; Referees: Antić, Jakovljević (SRB)
7 April 2024; 18:00	Lancz 10	(15–13)	Horilska 7	Mestská športová Hall, Šaľa; Attendance: 1,700; Referees: Antić, Jakovljević (SRB)
7 April 2024; 18:00	1× (yellow card) 4× (suspension)	Report	3× (yellow card) 7× (suspension)	Mestská športová Hall, Šaľa; Attendance: 1,700; Referees: Antić, Jakovljević (SRB)

=== Group 3 ===
Pos	Team	Pld	W	D	L	GF	GA	GD	Pts	Qualification
1	Netherlands	6	6	0	0	212	141	+71	12	Final tournament
2	Czech Republic	6	4	0	2	183	164	+19	8	Final tournament
3	Portugal	6	2	0	4	166	172	−6	4	Final tournament
4	Finland	6	0	0	6	122	206	−84	0	

Source: EHF
Rules for classification: 1) points; 2) head-to-head points; 3) head-to-head goal difference; 4) head-to-head number of goals scored; 5) goal difference.

11 October 2023; 17:15	Czech Republic	31–21	Finland	Datart Hala, Zlín; Attendance: 1,520; Referees: Loshak, Novikov (UKR)
11 October 2023; 17:15	Cholevová 8	(16–13)	Voutilainen 5	Datart Hala, Zlín; Attendance: 1,520; Referees: Loshak, Novikov (UKR)
11 October 2023; 17:15	1× (yellow card) 2× (suspension)	Report	5× (suspension)	Datart Hala, Zlín; Attendance: 1,520; Referees: Loshak, Novikov (UKR)

12 October 2023; 19:30	Netherlands	38–27	Portugal	Topsportcentrum, Almere; Attendance: 2,500; Referees: Merisi, Pepe (ITA)
12 October 2023; 19:30	Malestein 8	(20–14)	Rodrigues 6	Topsportcentrum, Almere; Attendance: 2,500; Referees: Merisi, Pepe (ITA)
12 October 2023; 19:30	5× (suspension)	Report	3× (suspension)	Topsportcentrum, Almere; Attendance: 2,500; Referees: Merisi, Pepe (ITA)

14 October 2023; 15:00	Finland	13–31	Netherlands	Karis Idrottshall, Karis; Attendance: 650; Referees: Hofer, Schmidhuber (AUT)
14 October 2023; 15:00	Kulju 4	(7–15)	four players 4	Karis Idrottshall, Karis; Attendance: 650; Referees: Hofer, Schmidhuber (AUT)
14 October 2023; 15:00	3× (suspension)	Report	3× (suspension)	Karis Idrottshall, Karis; Attendance: 650; Referees: Hofer, Schmidhuber (AUT)

15 October 2023; 16:00	Portugal	26–30	Czech Republic	Pavilhão Municipal de Paredes, Paredes; Attendance: 1,300; Referees: Pirvu, Potîrniche (ROU)
15 October 2023; 16:00	Sousa 9	(13–14)	Jeřábková 8	Pavilhão Municipal de Paredes, Paredes; Attendance: 1,300; Referees: Pirvu, Potîrniche (ROU)
15 October 2023; 16:00	6× (suspension)	Report	1× (yellow card) 5× (suspension)	Pavilhão Municipal de Paredes, Paredes; Attendance: 1,300; Referees: Pirvu, Potîrniche (ROU)

28 February 2024; 19:45	Czech Republic	29–30	Netherlands	UNYP Arena, Prague; Attendance: 1,457; Referees: Lovin, Stancu (ROU)
28 February 2024; 19:45	Jeřábková 9	(16–18)	Housheer, Van Wetering 5	UNYP Arena, Prague; Attendance: 1,457; Referees: Lovin, Stancu (ROU)
28 February 2024; 19:45	2× (suspension)	Report	1× (yellow card) 6× (suspension)	UNYP Arena, Prague; Attendance: 1,457; Referees: Lovin, Stancu (ROU)

29 February 2024; 17:30	Finland	21–28	Portugal	Energia Areena, Vantaa; Attendance: 750; Referees: Fält, Holm (SWE)
29 February 2024; 17:30	Von Nandelstadh 5	(12–15)	Minciună, Sousa 5	Energia Areena, Vantaa; Attendance: 750; Referees: Fält, Holm (SWE)
29 February 2024; 17:30	3× (suspension)	Report	2× (suspension)	Energia Areena, Vantaa; Attendance: 750; Referees: Fält, Holm (SWE)

3 March 2024; 13:30	Netherlands	42–25	Czech Republic	Maaspoort, 's-Hertogenbosch; Attendance: 2,000; Referees: Vujačić, Kažanegra (MNE)
3 March 2024; 13:30	Malestein 7	(24–11)	Cholevová 9	Maaspoort, 's-Hertogenbosch; Attendance: 2,000; Referees: Vujačić, Kažanegra (MNE)
3 March 2024; 13:30	4× (suspension)	Report		Maaspoort, 's-Hertogenbosch; Attendance: 2,000; Referees: Vujačić, Kažanegra (MNE)

3 March 2024; 20:30	Portugal	38–22	Finland	Centro de Desportos e Congresso, Matosinhos; Attendance: 2,650; Referees: Schaad, Müller (SUI)
3 March 2024; 20:30	Rodrigues 8	(21–11)	Heikkinen 8	Centro de Desportos e Congresso, Matosinhos; Attendance: 2,650; Referees: Schaad, Müller (SUI)
3 March 2024; 20:30	1× (suspension)	Report	3× (suspension)	Centro de Desportos e Congresso, Matosinhos; Attendance: 2,650; Referees: Schaad, Müller (SUI)

4 April 2024; 17:30	Finland	23–43	Czech Republic	Energia Areena, Vantaa; Attendance: 400; Referees: Pétursson, Þrastarson (ISL)
4 April 2024; 17:30	Hilli 5	(10–25)	Cholevová, Jeřábková 7	Energia Areena, Vantaa; Attendance: 400; Referees: Pétursson, Þrastarson (ISL)
4 April 2024; 17:30	4× (suspension)	Report	1× (yellow card) 1× (suspension)	Energia Areena, Vantaa; Attendance: 400; Referees: Pétursson, Þrastarson (ISL)

4 April 2024; 20:00	Portugal	25–36	Netherlands	Pavilhão Desportivo Municipal de Loulé, Loulé; Attendance: 1,100; Referees: Álvarez, Soria (ESP)
4 April 2024; 20:00	Sousa 6	(11–19)	Malestein 10	Pavilhão Desportivo Municipal de Loulé, Loulé; Attendance: 1,100; Referees: Álvarez, Soria (ESP)
4 April 2024; 20:00	1× (yellow card) 3× (suspension)	Report	1× (yellow card) 5× (suspension)	Pavilhão Desportivo Municipal de Loulé, Loulé; Attendance: 1,100; Referees: Álvarez, Soria (ESP)

7 April 2024; 18:00	Netherlands	35–22	Finland	Topsportcentrum, Almere; Attendance: 2,200; Referees: Marton, Dáné (HUN)
7 April 2024; 18:00	Van Maurik 7	(14–15)	Hilli 10	Topsportcentrum, Almere; Attendance: 2,200; Referees: Marton, Dáné (HUN)
7 April 2024; 18:00	1× (yellow card) 3× (suspension)	Report	4× (suspension)	Topsportcentrum, Almere; Attendance: 2,200; Referees: Marton, Dáné (HUN)

7 April 2024; 18:00	Czech Republic	25–22	Portugal	Městská sportovní Hala TJ Lokomotiva, Plzeň; Attendance: 1,357; Referees: Backović, Palačković (SLO)
7 April 2024; 18:00	Jeřábková 7	(10–13)	Lopes 7	Městská sportovní Hala TJ Lokomotiva, Plzeň; Attendance: 1,357; Referees: Backović, Palačković (SLO)
7 April 2024; 18:00	1× (yellow card) 3× (suspension)	Report	1× (yellow card) 4× (suspension)	Městská sportovní Hala TJ Lokomotiva, Plzeň; Attendance: 1,357; Referees: Backović, Palačković (SLO)

=== Group 4 ===
Pos	Team	Pld	W	D	L	GF	GA	GD	Pts	Qualification
1	France	6	6	0	0	270	88	+182	12	Final tournament
2	Slovenia	6	4	0	2	193	144	+49	8	Final tournament
3	Italy	6	2	0	4	143	174	−31	4	
4	Latvia	6	0	0	6	68	268	−200	0	

Source: EHF
Rules for classification: 1) points; 2) head-to-head points; 3) head-to-head goal difference; 4) head-to-head number of goals scored; 5) goal difference.

11 October 2023; 17:00	Slovenia	51–13	Latvia	Golovec Hall, Celje; Attendance: 400; Referees: Bošnjak, Marić (BIH)
11 October 2023; 17:00	three players 7	(24–11)	Cibuļska 7	Golovec Hall, Celje; Attendance: 400; Referees: Bošnjak, Marić (BIH)
11 October 2023; 17:00	4× (suspension)	Report	5× (suspension)	Golovec Hall, Celje; Attendance: 400; Referees: Bošnjak, Marić (BIH)

11 October 2023; 21:10	France	50–16	Italy	Le Palacium, Villeneuve-d'Ascq; Attendance: 1,500; Referees: Schols, Martens (BEL)
11 October 2023; 21:10	Valentini 10	(29–9)	Manojlovic 4	Le Palacium, Villeneuve-d'Ascq; Attendance: 1,500; Referees: Schols, Martens (BEL)
11 October 2023; 21:10	3× (suspension)	Report	2× (suspension)	Le Palacium, Villeneuve-d'Ascq; Attendance: 1,500; Referees: Schols, Martens (BEL)

14 October 2023; 16:10	Latvia	8–55	France	Sports Centre Dobele, Dobele; Attendance: 312; Referees: Rawicki, Fabryczny (POL)
14 October 2023; 16:10	three players 2	(1–26)	Toublanc 12	Sports Centre Dobele, Dobele; Attendance: 312; Referees: Rawicki, Fabryczny (POL)
14 October 2023; 16:10	7× (suspension)	Report	3× (suspension)	Sports Centre Dobele, Dobele; Attendance: 312; Referees: Rawicki, Fabryczny (POL)

15 October 2023; 18:00	Italy	18–31	Slovenia	Pala Santa Filomena, Chieti; Attendance: 500; Referees: Pagh, Thygesen (DEN)
15 October 2023; 18:00	Ghilardi 4	(8–12)	Stanko 5	Pala Santa Filomena, Chieti; Attendance: 500; Referees: Pagh, Thygesen (DEN)
15 October 2023; 18:00	1× (yellow card) 2× (suspension)	Report	3× (suspension)	Pala Santa Filomena, Chieti; Attendance: 500; Referees: Pagh, Thygesen (DEN)

29 February 2024; 17:00	Slovenia	20–35	France	Rdeča dvorana, Velenje; Attendance: 1,750; Referees: Praštalo, Balvan (BIH)
29 February 2024; 17:00	Gros 6	(11–13)	Flippes, Granier 5	Rdeča dvorana, Velenje; Attendance: 1,750; Referees: Praštalo, Balvan (BIH)
29 February 2024; 17:00	1× (yellow card)	Report	1× (yellow card) 2× (suspension)	Rdeča dvorana, Velenje; Attendance: 1,750; Referees: Praštalo, Balvan (BIH)

29 February 2024; 18:10	Latvia	14–32	Italy	Sports Centre Dobele, Dobele; Attendance: 255; Referees: Kinnari, Skogberg (FIN)
29 February 2024; 18:10	three players 3	(5–19)	Rossomando 8	Sports Centre Dobele, Dobele; Attendance: 255; Referees: Kinnari, Skogberg (FIN)
29 February 2024; 18:10	1× (yellow card) 5× (suspension)	Report	3× (suspension)	Sports Centre Dobele, Dobele; Attendance: 255; Referees: Kinnari, Skogberg (FIN)

3 March 2024; 17:00	France	41–22	Slovenia	Palais des Sports, Orléans; Attendance: 8,100; Referees: Vranes, Wenninger (AUT)
3 March 2024; 17:00	Horacek, Valentini 8	(19–9)	Gros 5	Palais des Sports, Orléans; Attendance: 8,100; Referees: Vranes, Wenninger (AUT)
3 March 2024; 17:00	1× (yellow card) 4× (suspension)	Report	5× (suspension) 1× (red card)	Palais des Sports, Orléans; Attendance: 8,100; Referees: Vranes, Wenninger (AUT)

3 March 2024; 18:30	Italy	43–8	Latvia	Pala Santa Filomena, Chieti; Attendance: 650; Referees: Charalambous, Efstathiou (CYP)
3 March 2024; 18:30	Gislimberti 6	(21–3)	Kaņepe, Zaharāne 2	Pala Santa Filomena, Chieti; Attendance: 650; Referees: Charalambous, Efstathiou (CYP)
3 March 2024; 18:30	1× (suspension)	Report	4× (suspension)	Pala Santa Filomena, Chieti; Attendance: 650; Referees: Charalambous, Efstathiou (CYP)

3 April 2024; 18:00	Italy	13–36	France	Pala Santa Filomena, Chieti; Attendance: 250; Referees: Jakovljević, Kovačević (SRB)
3 April 2024; 18:00	Ghilardi, Gislimberti 3	(7–19)	three players 6	Pala Santa Filomena, Chieti; Attendance: 250; Referees: Jakovljević, Kovačević (SRB)
3 April 2024; 18:00	2× (suspension)	Report	2× (suspension)	Pala Santa Filomena, Chieti; Attendance: 250; Referees: Jakovljević, Kovačević (SRB)

4 April 2024; 18:10	Latvia	16–34	Slovenia	Sports Centre Dobele, Dobele; Attendance: 220; Referees: Fält, Holm (SWE)
4 April 2024; 18:10	Kaņepe 8	(5–18)	Černigoj, Pogorelc 6	Sports Centre Dobele, Dobele; Attendance: 220; Referees: Fält, Holm (SWE)
4 April 2024; 18:10	1× (suspension)	Report	2× (suspension)	Sports Centre Dobele, Dobele; Attendance: 220; Referees: Fält, Holm (SWE)

7 April 2024; 18:00	France	53–9	Latvia	Arena Saint-Étienne Métropole, Saint-Chamond; Attendance: 3,200; Referees: Murariu, Paraschiv (ROU)
7 April 2024; 18:00	Coatanea 10	(24–7)	Prūse 3	Arena Saint-Étienne Métropole, Saint-Chamond; Attendance: 3,200; Referees: Murariu, Paraschiv (ROU)
7 April 2024; 18:00	1× (yellow card) 3× (suspension)	Report	1× (suspension)	Arena Saint-Étienne Métropole, Saint-Chamond; Attendance: 3,200; Referees: Murariu, Paraschiv (ROU)

7 April 2024; 18:00	Slovenia	35–21	Italy	Kodeljevo Sports Park, Ljubljana; Attendance: 770; Referees: Pirvu, Potîrniche (ROU)
7 April 2024; 18:00	Mavsar 8	(22–11)	Dalla Costa 5	Kodeljevo Sports Park, Ljubljana; Attendance: 770; Referees: Pirvu, Potîrniche (ROU)
7 April 2024; 18:00	1× (yellow card) 4× (suspension)	Report	2× (suspension)	Kodeljevo Sports Park, Ljubljana; Attendance: 770; Referees: Pirvu, Potîrniche (ROU)

=== Group 5 ===
Pos	Team	Pld	W	D	L	GF	GA	GD	Pts	Qualification
1	Spain	6	6	0	0	216	107	+109	12	Final tournament
2	North Macedonia	6	4	0	2	181	146	+35	8	Final tournament
3	Lithuania	6	1	0	5	160	207	−47	2 (Note: Lithuania 74–61 Azerbaijan)	
4	Azerbaijan	6	1	0	5	134	231	−97	2	

Source: EHF
Rules for classification: 1) points; 2) head-to-head points; 3) head-to-head goal difference; 4) head-to-head number of goals scored; 5) goal difference.
Notes:

11 October 2023; 18:00	North Macedonia	40–17	Azerbaijan	Jane Sandanski Arena, Skopje; Attendance: 1,000; Referees: Picard, Vauchez (FRA)
11 October 2023; 18:00	Sazdovska, Sedloska 7	(23–10)	Slemanova 6	Jane Sandanski Arena, Skopje; Attendance: 1,000; Referees: Picard, Vauchez (FRA)
11 October 2023; 18:00	3× (suspension)	Report	2× (suspension)	Jane Sandanski Arena, Skopje; Attendance: 1,000; Referees: Picard, Vauchez (FRA)

11 October 2023; 20:30	Spain	47–14	Lithuania	Palau d'Esports L'Illa de Benidorm, Benidorm; Attendance: 2,020; Referees: Fahner, Kubis (POL)
11 October 2023; 20:30	Cesáreo 7	(27–5)	Kolosovė, Voskresenskaja 3	Palau d'Esports L'Illa de Benidorm, Benidorm; Attendance: 2,020; Referees: Fahner, Kubis (POL)
11 October 2023; 20:30	2× (suspension)	Report	1× (yellow card) 2× (suspension)	Palau d'Esports L'Illa de Benidorm, Benidorm; Attendance: 2,020; Referees: Fahner, Kubis (POL)

14 October 2023; 15:00	Azerbaijan	18–38	Spain	Baku Sports Palace, Baku; Attendance: 436; Referees: Hatipoğlu, Şimşek (TUR)
14 October 2023; 15:00	Bayramova 5	(12–20)	Etxeberria 8	Baku Sports Palace, Baku; Attendance: 436; Referees: Hatipoğlu, Şimşek (TUR)
14 October 2023; 15:00	4× (suspension)	Report	1× (yellow card) 4× (suspension)	Baku Sports Palace, Baku; Attendance: 436; Referees: Hatipoğlu, Şimşek (TUR)

15 October 2023; 15:00	Lithuania	28–31	North Macedonia	Avia Solutions Group Arena, Vilnius; Attendance: 568; Referees: Lovin, Stancu (ROU)
15 October 2023; 15:00	Arciševskaja 9	(15–17)	Ristovska 9	Avia Solutions Group Arena, Vilnius; Attendance: 568; Referees: Lovin, Stancu (ROU)
15 October 2023; 15:00	4× (suspension)	Report	1× (yellow card) 4× (suspension) 1× (red card)	Avia Solutions Group Arena, Vilnius; Attendance: 568; Referees: Lovin, Stancu (ROU)

28 February 2024; 14:00	Azerbaijan	35–33	Lithuania	Baku Sports Palace, Baku; Attendance: 350; Referees: Sirbu, Serdiuc (MDA)
28 February 2024; 14:00	Bayramova 13	(18–18)	Pilikauskaitė 10	Baku Sports Palace, Baku; Attendance: 350; Referees: Sirbu, Serdiuc (MDA)
28 February 2024; 14:00	4× (suspension)	Report	1× (yellow card) 6× (suspension)	Baku Sports Palace, Baku; Attendance: 350; Referees: Sirbu, Serdiuc (MDA)

29 February 2024; 18:00	North Macedonia	19–31	Spain	Boris Trajkovski Sports Center, Skopje; Attendance: 800; Referees: Ivanović, Vujisić (MNE)
29 February 2024; 18:00	Ristovska 6	(11–17)	Cabral 7	Boris Trajkovski Sports Center, Skopje; Attendance: 800; Referees: Ivanović, Vujisić (MNE)
29 February 2024; 18:00	1× (yellow card) 5× (suspension)	Report	1× (yellow card) 7× (suspension)	Boris Trajkovski Sports Center, Skopje; Attendance: 800; Referees: Ivanović, Vujisić (MNE)

3 March 2024; 15:00	Lithuania	41–26	Azerbaijan	Avia Solutions Group Arena, Vilnius; Attendance: 957; Referees: Marton, Dáné (HUN)
3 March 2024; 15:00	Andronik, Pilikauskaitė 9	(18–12)	Bayramova 6	Avia Solutions Group Arena, Vilnius; Attendance: 957; Referees: Marton, Dáné (HUN)
3 March 2024; 15:00	8× (suspension)	Report	7× (suspension) 1× (red card)	Avia Solutions Group Arena, Vilnius; Attendance: 957; Referees: Marton, Dáné (HUN)

3 March 2024; 18:00	Spain	24–20	North Macedonia	Pabellon Municipal de Tias, Lanzarote; Attendance: 1,510; Referees: Watson, Welin (SWE)
3 March 2024; 18:00	So Delgado 4	(10–9)	four players 3	Pabellon Municipal de Tias, Lanzarote; Attendance: 1,510; Referees: Watson, Welin (SWE)
3 March 2024; 18:00	3× (suspension)	Report	2× (suspension)	Pabellon Municipal de Tias, Lanzarote; Attendance: 1,510; Referees: Watson, Welin (SWE)

3 April 2024; 15:00	Azerbaijan	22–37	North Macedonia	Baku Sports Palace, Baku; Attendance: 350; Referees: Rawicki, Fabryczny (POL)
3 April 2024; 15:00	Bayramova 7	(12–19)	Sazdovska 7	Baku Sports Palace, Baku; Attendance: 350; Referees: Rawicki, Fabryczny (POL)
3 April 2024; 15:00	2× (suspension)	Report	1× (yellow card) 4× (suspension)	Baku Sports Palace, Baku; Attendance: 350; Referees: Rawicki, Fabryczny (POL)

3 April 2024; 18:00	Lithuania	20–34	Spain	Avia Solutions Group Arena, Vilnius; Attendance: 485; Referees: Loshak, Novikov (UKR)
3 April 2024; 18:00	Rakauskienė 8	(9–17)	So Delgado 8	Avia Solutions Group Arena, Vilnius; Attendance: 485; Referees: Loshak, Novikov (UKR)
3 April 2024; 18:00	5× (suspension)	Report	1× (yellow card) 2× (suspension)	Avia Solutions Group Arena, Vilnius; Attendance: 485; Referees: Loshak, Novikov (UKR)

7 April 2024; 18:00	Spain	42–16	Azerbaijan	Pavillón Municipal do Porriño, O Porriño; Attendance: 2,500; Referees: Schaad, Müller (SUI)
7 April 2024; 18:00	Buforn 8	(20–8)	Bayramova 8	Pavillón Municipal do Porriño, O Porriño; Attendance: 2,500; Referees: Schaad, Müller (SUI)
7 April 2024; 18:00	1× (suspension)	Report	6× (suspension) 1× (red card)	Pavillón Municipal do Porriño, O Porriño; Attendance: 2,500; Referees: Schaad, Müller (SUI)

7 April 2024; 18:00	North Macedonia	34–24	Lithuania	Boris Trajkovski Sports Center, Skopje; Attendance: 1,232; Referees: Charitsos, Naskos (GRE)
7 April 2024; 18:00	Rizoska, Sedloska 6	(18–12)	Arciševskaja 10	Boris Trajkovski Sports Center, Skopje; Attendance: 1,232; Referees: Charitsos, Naskos (GRE)
7 April 2024; 18:00	1× (yellow card) 3× (suspension)	Report	2× (yellow card) 4× (suspension)	Boris Trajkovski Sports Center, Skopje; Attendance: 1,232; Referees: Charitsos, Naskos (GRE)

=== Group 6 ===
Pos	Team	Pld	W	D	L	GF	GA	GD	Pts	Qualification
1	Montenegro	6	6	0	0	195	143	+52	12	Final tournament
2	Serbia	6	3	1	2	189	141	+48	7	Final tournament
3	Turkey	6	2	1	3	170	165	+5	5	Final tournament
4	Bulgaria	6	0	0	6	107	212	−105	0	

Source: EHF
Rules for classification: 1) points; 2) head-to-head points; 3) head-to-head goal difference; 4) head-to-head number of goals scored; 5) goal difference.

11 October 2023; 18:00	Montenegro	39–23	Turkey	Bemax Arena, Podgorica; Attendance: 1,500; Referees: Cipov, Klus (SVK)
11 October 2023; 18:00	Mugoša 8	(16–14)	İskit 6	Bemax Arena, Podgorica; Attendance: 1,500; Referees: Cipov, Klus (SVK)
11 October 2023; 18:00	6× (suspension)	Report	3× (suspension)	Bemax Arena, Podgorica; Attendance: 1,500; Referees: Cipov, Klus (SVK)

11 October 2023; 18:00	Serbia	40–16	Bulgaria	Crystal Hall, Zrenjanin; Attendance: 2,200; Referees: Charalambous, Efstathiou (CYP)
11 October 2023; 18:00	Radosavljević 8	(23–8)	Milanova 6	Crystal Hall, Zrenjanin; Attendance: 2,200; Referees: Charalambous, Efstathiou (CYP)
11 October 2023; 18:00	1× (yellow card) 3× (suspension)	Report	1× (yellow card) 6× (suspension)	Crystal Hall, Zrenjanin; Attendance: 2,200; Referees: Charalambous, Efstathiou (CYP)

15 October 2023; 16:00	Bulgaria	20–34	Montenegro	Arena Shumen, Shumen; Attendance: 1,000; Referees: Me. Ilievski, Mi. Ilievski (MKD)
15 October 2023; 16:00	Grozdanova 6	(11–13)	Pletikosić 8	Arena Shumen, Shumen; Attendance: 1,000; Referees: Me. Ilievski, Mi. Ilievski (MKD)
15 October 2023; 16:00	1× (yellow card) 5× (suspension)	Report	1× (yellow card) 3× (suspension)	Arena Shumen, Shumen; Attendance: 1,000; Referees: Me. Ilievski, Mi. Ilievski (MKD)

15 October 2023; 16:30	Turkey	29–29	Serbia	Dr. Yasar Sevim Sport Hall, Ankara; Attendance: 1,060; Referees: Altmár, Horváth (HUN)
15 October 2023; 16:30	İskit 8	(18–16)	Radosavljević 6	Dr. Yasar Sevim Sport Hall, Ankara; Attendance: 1,060; Referees: Altmár, Horváth (HUN)
15 October 2023; 16:30	6× (suspension) 1× (red card)	Report	5× (suspension)	Dr. Yasar Sevim Sport Hall, Ankara; Attendance: 1,060; Referees: Altmár, Horváth (HUN)

28 February 2024; 17:00	Bulgaria	24–30	Turkey	Arena Shumen, Shumen; Attendance: 1,650; Referees: Xhema, Jahja (KOS)
28 February 2024; 17:00	Gencheva, Panayotova 6	(12–13)	İskit 9	Arena Shumen, Shumen; Attendance: 1,650; Referees: Xhema, Jahja (KOS)
28 February 2024; 17:00	2× (yellow card) 1× (suspension)	Report	2× (yellow card) 5× (suspension)	Arena Shumen, Shumen; Attendance: 1,650; Referees: Xhema, Jahja (KOS)

29 February 2024; 18:00	Serbia	30–31	Montenegro	Crystal Hall, Zrenjanin; Attendance: 2,520; Referees: Pirvu, Potîrniche (ROU)
29 February 2024; 18:00	Janjušević 8	(12–16)	Pletikosić 9	Crystal Hall, Zrenjanin; Attendance: 2,520; Referees: Pirvu, Potîrniche (ROU)
29 February 2024; 18:00	5× (suspension)	Report	1× (yellow card) 6× (suspension)	Crystal Hall, Zrenjanin; Attendance: 2,520; Referees: Pirvu, Potîrniche (ROU)

3 March 2024; 15:00	Turkey	38–13	Bulgaria	Dr. Yasar Sevim Sport Hall, Ankara; Attendance: 1,922; Referees: Charitsos, Naskos (GRE)
3 March 2024; 15:00	Aydemir, Türkoğlu 7	(19–7)	Gencheva, Grozdanova 4	Dr. Yasar Sevim Sport Hall, Ankara; Attendance: 1,922; Referees: Charitsos, Naskos (GRE)
3 March 2024; 15:00	3× (suspension)	Report	1× (suspension)	Dr. Yasar Sevim Sport Hall, Ankara; Attendance: 1,922; Referees: Charitsos, Naskos (GRE)

3 March 2024; 18:00	Montenegro	26–25	Serbia	Bemax Arena, Podgorica; Attendance: 2,245; Referees: D. Lončar, Z. Lončar (CRO)
3 March 2024; 18:00	Brnović 7	(14–14)	three players 5	Bemax Arena, Podgorica; Attendance: 2,245; Referees: D. Lončar, Z. Lončar (CRO)
3 March 2024; 18:00	3× (suspension)	Report	1× (yellow card) 3× (suspension)	Bemax Arena, Podgorica; Attendance: 2,245; Referees: D. Lončar, Z. Lončar (CRO)

3 April 2024; 15:00	Turkey	28–30	Montenegro	Rize Sports Hall, Rize; Attendance: 2,650; Referees: Yovchev, Yonchev (BUL)
3 April 2024; 15:00	Türkoğlu 6	(15–14)	Mugoša 9	Rize Sports Hall, Rize; Attendance: 2,650; Referees: Yovchev, Yonchev (BUL)
3 April 2024; 15:00	1× (yellow card) 2× (suspension)	Report	3× (suspension)	Rize Sports Hall, Rize; Attendance: 2,650; Referees: Yovchev, Yonchev (BUL)

3 April 2024; 16:00	Bulgaria	17–35	Serbia	Arena Shumen, Shumen; Attendance: 562; Referees: Hofer, Schmidhuber (AUT)
3 April 2024; 16:00	Gencheva 7	(6–19)	Stamenić 8	Arena Shumen, Shumen; Attendance: 562; Referees: Hofer, Schmidhuber (AUT)
3 April 2024; 16:00	1× (yellow card) 1× (suspension)	Report	1× (yellow card) 1× (suspension) 1× (red card)	Arena Shumen, Shumen; Attendance: 562; Referees: Hofer, Schmidhuber (AUT)

7 April 2024; 18:00	Montenegro	35–17	Bulgaria	Bemax Arena, Podgorica; Attendance: 2,500; Referees: Bošnjak, Marić (BIH)
7 April 2024; 18:00	Despotović 7	(17–11)	Panayotova 6	Bemax Arena, Podgorica; Attendance: 2,500; Referees: Bošnjak, Marić (BIH)
7 April 2024; 18:00	1× (yellow card) 5× (suspension)	Report	1× (yellow card) 4× (suspension)	Bemax Arena, Podgorica; Attendance: 2,500; Referees: Bošnjak, Marić (BIH)

7 April 2024; 18:00	Serbia	30–22	Turkey	Crystal Hall, Zrenjanin; Attendance: 2,600; Referees: I. Covalciuc, A. Covalciuc (MDA)
7 April 2024; 18:00	Janjušević, Radević 7	(14–10)	Türkoğlu 6	Crystal Hall, Zrenjanin; Attendance: 2,600; Referees: I. Covalciuc, A. Covalciuc (MDA)
7 April 2024; 18:00	3× (suspension)	Report	2× (suspension)	Crystal Hall, Zrenjanin; Attendance: 2,600; Referees: I. Covalciuc, A. Covalciuc (MDA)

=== Group 7 ===
Pos	Team	Pld	W	D	L	GF	GA	GD	Pts	Qualification
1	Sweden	6	6	0	0	228	129	+99	12	Final tournament
2	Iceland	6	4	0	2	162	146	+16	8	Final tournament
3	Faroe Islands	6	2	0	4	163	157	+6	4	Final tournament
4	Luxembourg	6	0	0	6	101	222	−121	0	

Source: EHF
Rules for classification: 1) points; 2) head-to-head points; 3) head-to-head goal difference; 4) head-to-head number of goals scored; 5) goal difference.

11 October 2023; 21:30	Iceland	32–14	Luxembourg	Ithrottamidstod Hauka Asvellir, Hafnarfjörður; Attendance: 1,147; Referees: Álvarez, Soria (ESP)
11 October 2023; 21:30	Erlingsdóttir 7	(19–7)	Welter 4	Ithrottamidstod Hauka Asvellir, Hafnarfjörður; Attendance: 1,147; Referees: Álvarez, Soria (ESP)
11 October 2023; 21:30	1× (yellow card) 6× (suspension)	Report	1× (yellow card) 2× (suspension)	Ithrottamidstod Hauka Asvellir, Hafnarfjörður; Attendance: 1,147; Referees: Álvarez, Soria (ESP)

12 October 2023; 18:30	Sweden	37–20	Faroe Islands	IFU Arena, Uppsala; Attendance: 2,307; Referees: Härgin, Makejev (EST)
12 October 2023; 18:30	Blohm 9	(19–13)	Mittún 4	IFU Arena, Uppsala; Attendance: 2,307; Referees: Härgin, Makejev (EST)
12 October 2023; 18:30	1× (yellow card) 3× (suspension)	Report	1× (yellow card) 1× (suspension)	IFU Arena, Uppsala; Attendance: 2,307; Referees: Härgin, Makejev (EST)

15 October 2023; 16:00	Luxembourg	17–39	Sweden	d'Coque, Luxembourg City; Attendance: 750; Referees: Pukšič, Satler (SLO)
15 October 2023; 16:00	Welter 8	(7–15)	three players 7	d'Coque, Luxembourg City; Attendance: 750; Referees: Pukšič, Satler (SLO)
15 October 2023; 16:00	1× (yellow card) 3× (suspension)	Report	4× (suspension)	d'Coque, Luxembourg City; Attendance: 750; Referees: Pukšič, Satler (SLO)

15 October 2023; 16:00	Faroe Islands	23–28	Iceland	Høllin á Hálsi, Tórshavn; Attendance: 1,000; Referees: Braseth, Sundet (NOR)
15 October 2023; 16:00	Mittún 6	(12–11)	Erlingsdóttir, Sturludóttir 6	Høllin á Hálsi, Tórshavn; Attendance: 1,000; Referees: Braseth, Sundet (NOR)
15 October 2023; 16:00	2× (suspension)	Report	2× (suspension)	Høllin á Hálsi, Tórshavn; Attendance: 1,000; Referees: Braseth, Sundet (NOR)

28 February 2024; 18:45	Luxembourg	16–34	Faroe Islands	d'Coque, Luxembourg City; Attendance: 546; Referees: Fahner, Kubis (POL)
28 February 2024; 18:45	four players 3	(9–16)	Mittún 8	d'Coque, Luxembourg City; Attendance: 546; Referees: Fahner, Kubis (POL)
28 February 2024; 18:45	2× (suspension)	Report	2× (suspension)	d'Coque, Luxembourg City; Attendance: 546; Referees: Fahner, Kubis (POL)

28 February 2024; 20:30	Iceland	24–37	Sweden	Ithrottamidstod Hauka Asvellir, Hafnarfjörður; Attendance: 1,200; Referees: Duplii, Pobedrina (UKR)
28 February 2024; 20:30	Þorkelsdóttir 5	(12–17)	Roberts 7	Ithrottamidstod Hauka Asvellir, Hafnarfjörður; Attendance: 1,200; Referees: Duplii, Pobedrina (UKR)
28 February 2024; 20:30	5× (suspension)	Report	6× (suspension) 1× (red card)	Ithrottamidstod Hauka Asvellir, Hafnarfjörður; Attendance: 1,200; Referees: Duplii, Pobedrina (UKR)

2 March 2024; 14:00	Sweden	37–23	Iceland	Brinova Arena, Karlskrona; Attendance: 2,753; Referees: Hansen, Jensen (DEN)
2 March 2024; 14:00	Dano, Lundström 6	(18–11)	Sturludóttir 6	Brinova Arena, Karlskrona; Attendance: 2,753; Referees: Hansen, Jensen (DEN)
2 March 2024; 14:00	1× (yellow card) 2× (suspension)	Report	1× (yellow card)	Brinova Arena, Karlskrona; Attendance: 2,753; Referees: Hansen, Jensen (DEN)

3 March 2024; 18:00	Faroe Islands	39–21	Luxembourg	Høllin á Hálsi, Tórshavn; Attendance: 800; Referees: Radčenko, Pērsis (LAT)
3 March 2024; 18:00	Halsdóttir 6	(17–9)	Rodesch 6	Høllin á Hálsi, Tórshavn; Attendance: 800; Referees: Radčenko, Pērsis (LAT)
3 March 2024; 18:00	1× (suspension)	Report	1× (yellow card)	Høllin á Hálsi, Tórshavn; Attendance: 800; Referees: Radčenko, Pērsis (LAT)

3 April 2024; 18:45	Luxembourg	15–31	Iceland	d'Coque, Luxembourg City; Attendance: 639; Referees: Peretz, Schwartz (ISR)
3 April 2024; 18:45	Rodesch 4	(5–15)	Stefánsdóttir 7	d'Coque, Luxembourg City; Attendance: 639; Referees: Peretz, Schwartz (ISR)
3 April 2024; 18:45	3× (suspension)	Report	4× (suspension)	d'Coque, Luxembourg City; Attendance: 639; Referees: Peretz, Schwartz (ISR)

3 April 2024; 20:00	Faroe Islands	27–31	Sweden	Høllin á Hálsi, Tórshavn; Attendance: 1,347; Referees: Schols, Martens (BEL)
3 April 2024; 20:00	Mittún 8	(11–14)	Thorleifsdóttir 5	Høllin á Hálsi, Tórshavn; Attendance: 1,347; Referees: Schols, Martens (BEL)
3 April 2024; 20:00	2× (suspension)	Report	1× (yellow card) 2× (suspension)	Høllin á Hálsi, Tórshavn; Attendance: 1,347; Referees: Schols, Martens (BEL)

7 April 2024; 18:00	Sweden	47–18	Luxembourg	Thorén Arena, Umeå; Attendance: 1,704; Referees: Riello, Panetta (ITA)
7 April 2024; 18:00	Lundström 7	(24–7)	Welter 4	Thorén Arena, Umeå; Attendance: 1,704; Referees: Riello, Panetta (ITA)
7 April 2024; 18:00	3× (suspension)	Report	2× (suspension)	Thorén Arena, Umeå; Attendance: 1,704; Referees: Riello, Panetta (ITA)

7 April 2024; 18:00	Iceland	24–20	Faroe Islands	Ithrottamidstod Hauka Asvellir, Hafnarfjörður; Attendance: 1,230; Referees: Weijmans, Wolbertus (NED)
7 April 2024; 18:00	Þorkelsdóttir 10	(12–8)	Mittún 8	Ithrottamidstod Hauka Asvellir, Hafnarfjörður; Attendance: 1,230; Referees: Weijmans, Wolbertus (NED)
7 April 2024; 18:00	1× (yellow card) 3× (suspension)	Report	1× (yellow card) 3× (suspension)	Ithrottamidstod Hauka Asvellir, Hafnarfjörður; Attendance: 1,230; Referees: Weijmans, Wolbertus (NED)

=== Group 8 ===
Pos	Team	Pld	W	D	L	GF	GA	GD	Pts	Qualification
1	Denmark	4	4	0	0	149	89	+60	8	Final tournament
2	Poland	4	2	0	2	115	109	+6	4	Final tournament
3	Kosovo	4	0	0	4	80	146	−66	0	

Source: EHF
Rules for classification: 1) points; 2) head-to-head points; 3) head-to-head goal difference; 4) head-to-head number of goals scored; 5) goal difference.

12 October 2023; 21:00	Denmark	44–17	Kosovo	Forum Horsens, Horsens; Attendance: 2,711; Referees: Klompers, Stobbe (NED)
12 October 2023; 21:00	Jørgensen 7	(21–7)	Demaj 5	Forum Horsens, Horsens; Attendance: 2,711; Referees: Klompers, Stobbe (NED)
12 October 2023; 21:00	1× (suspension)	Report	1× (suspension)	Forum Horsens, Horsens; Attendance: 2,711; Referees: Klompers, Stobbe (NED)

14 October 2023; 20:15	Kosovo	19–40	Denmark	Palace of Youth and Sports, Pristina; Attendance: 1,200; Referees: Yovchev, Yonchev (BUL)
14 October 2023; 20:15	Demaj 8	(11–21)	Halilcevic 8	Palace of Youth and Sports, Pristina; Attendance: 1,200; Referees: Yovchev, Yonchev (BUL)
14 October 2023; 20:15	4× (suspension)	Report	1× (yellow card) 2× (suspension)	Palace of Youth and Sports, Pristina; Attendance: 1,200; Referees: Yovchev, Yonchev (BUL)

28 February 2024; 19:00	Poland	22–26	Denmark	Hala widowiskowo-sportowa RCS w Lubinie, Lubin; Attendance: 3,700; Referees: Sekulić, Jovandić (SRB)
28 February 2024; 19:00	four players 4	(9–11)	A.M. Hansen, Jørgensen 5	Hala widowiskowo-sportowa RCS w Lubinie, Lubin; Attendance: 3,700; Referees: Sekulić, Jovandić (SRB)
28 February 2024; 19:00	1× (yellow card) 2× (suspension)	Report		Hala widowiskowo-sportowa RCS w Lubinie, Lubin; Attendance: 3,700; Referees: Sekulić, Jovandić (SRB)

2 March 2024; 16:00	Denmark	39–31	Poland	Ballerup Super Arena, Ballerup; Attendance: 4,721; Referees: Rauchs, Linster (LUX)
2 March 2024; 16:00	Jørgensen 7	(22–13)	Balsam 9	Ballerup Super Arena, Ballerup; Attendance: 4,721; Referees: Rauchs, Linster (LUX)
2 March 2024; 16:00	1× (yellow card) 4× (suspension)	Report	1× (yellow card) 5× (suspension)	Ballerup Super Arena, Ballerup; Attendance: 4,721; Referees: Rauchs, Linster (LUX)

4 April 2024; 17:45	Kosovo	27–34	Poland	Palace of Youth and Sports, Pristina; Attendance: 1,250; Referees: Mikelić, Parađina (CRO)
4 April 2024; 17:45	Demaj 12	(17–17)	Kobylińska 9	Palace of Youth and Sports, Pristina; Attendance: 1,250; Referees: Mikelić, Parađina (CRO)
4 April 2024; 17:45	1× (yellow card) 1× (suspension)	Report	1× (yellow card) 4× (suspension)	Palace of Youth and Sports, Pristina; Attendance: 1,250; Referees: Mikelić, Parađina (CRO)

7 April 2024; 18:00	Poland	28–17	Kosovo	CRS Hall Zielona Góra, Zielona Góra; Attendance: 3,000; Referees: Watson, Welin (SWE)
7 April 2024; 18:00	Balsam 9	(15–9)	Demaj 4	CRS Hall Zielona Góra, Zielona Góra; Attendance: 3,000; Referees: Watson, Welin (SWE)
7 April 2024; 18:00	1× (yellow card) 4× (suspension)	Report	1× (yellow card) 3× (suspension)	CRS Hall Zielona Góra, Zielona Góra; Attendance: 3,000; Referees: Watson, Welin (SWE)

=== Ranking of third-placed teams ===
The results against the fourth-placed team are omitted. As there are only three teams in group 8, all results are counted.

Pos	Grp	Team	Pld	W	D	L	GF	GA	GD	Pts	Qualification
1	6	Turkey	4	0	1	3	102	128	−26	1	Final tournament
2	2	Slovakia	4	0	1	3	81	122	−41	1	Final tournament
3	3	Portugal	4	0	0	4	100	129	−29	0	Final tournament
4	7	Faroe Islands	4	0	0	4	90	120	−30	0	Final tournament
5	1	Greece	4	0	0	4	79	119	−40	0	
6	5	Lithuania	4	0	0	4	86	146	−60	0	
7	8	Kosovo	4	0	0	4	80	146	−66	0	
8	4	Italy	4	0	0	4	68	152	−84	0	

Source: EHF
Rules for classification: 1) points against #1 and #2 in group; 2) goal difference against #1 and #2 in group; 3) goals scored against #1 and #2 in group; 4) draw.

== EHF Euro Cup ==
The Women's EHF Euro Cup was played between the hosts Austria, Hungary and Switzerland, plus the champions of the 2022 tournament, Norway.

Pos	Team	Pld	W	D	L	GF	GA	GD	Pts
1	Norway	6	6	0	0	239	144	+95	12
2	Hungary	6	4	0	2	192	186	+6	8
3	Switzerland	6	2	0	4	166	212	−46	4
4	Austria	6	0	0	6	159	214	−55	0

Source: EHF
Rules for classification: 1) points; 2) head-to-head points; 3) head-to-head goal difference; 4) head-to-head number of goals scored; 5) goal difference.

11 October 2023; 18:15	Switzerland	33–27	Austria	Kreuzbleichhalle, St. Gallen; Attendance: 1,530; Referees: Vujačić, Kažanegra (MNE)
11 October 2023; 18:15	Emmenegger 10	(18–11)	I. Ivančok 11	Kreuzbleichhalle, St. Gallen; Attendance: 1,530; Referees: Vujačić, Kažanegra (MNE)
11 October 2023; 18:15	1× (yellow card) 5× (suspension)	Report	1× (yellow card) 1× (suspension)	Kreuzbleichhalle, St. Gallen; Attendance: 1,530; Referees: Vujačić, Kažanegra (MNE)

11 October 2023; 19:00	Hungary	31–38	Norway	Főnix Aréna, Debrecen; Attendance: 4,400; Referees: Duplii, Pobedrina (UKR)
11 October 2023; 19:00	Klujber 6	(17–19)	Reistad 6	Főnix Aréna, Debrecen; Attendance: 4,400; Referees: Duplii, Pobedrina (UKR)
11 October 2023; 19:00	6× (suspension)	Report	5× (suspension)	Főnix Aréna, Debrecen; Attendance: 4,400; Referees: Duplii, Pobedrina (UKR)

14 October 2023; 16:45	Norway	44–29	Switzerland	Jotron Arena, Larvik; Attendance: 3,387; Referees: Hansen, Jensen (DEN)
14 October 2023; 16:45	Ingstad 7	(23–18)	Schmid 6	Jotron Arena, Larvik; Attendance: 3,387; Referees: Hansen, Jensen (DEN)
14 October 2023; 16:45	2× (yellow card) 1× (suspension)	Report	1× (yellow card) 1× (suspension)	Jotron Arena, Larvik; Attendance: 3,387; Referees: Hansen, Jensen (DEN)

15 October 2023; 17:00	Austria	32–34	Hungary	Multiversum, Schwechat; Attendance: 1,500; Referees: Christidi, Papamattheou (GRE)
15 October 2023; 17:00	K. Pandza 11	(15–19)	Klujber 9	Multiversum, Schwechat; Attendance: 1,500; Referees: Christidi, Papamattheou (GRE)
15 October 2023; 17:00	2× (suspension)	Report	1× (yellow card) 3× (suspension)	Multiversum, Schwechat; Attendance: 1,500; Referees: Christidi, Papamattheou (GRE)

28 February 2024; 17:00	Hungary	38–26	Switzerland	Tatabányai Multifunkcionális Sportcsarnok, Tatabánya; Attendance: 3,024; Referees: Loshak, Novikov (UKR)
28 February 2024; 17:00	Kuczora 10	(16–14)	Schmid 6	Tatabányai Multifunkcionális Sportcsarnok, Tatabánya; Attendance: 3,024; Referees: Loshak, Novikov (UKR)
28 February 2024; 17:00	3× (suspension) 1× (red card)	Report	4× (suspension)	Tatabányai Multifunkcionális Sportcsarnok, Tatabánya; Attendance: 3,024; Referees: Loshak, Novikov (UKR)

28 February 2024; 19:15	Norway	43–22	Austria	Halden Arena, Halden; Attendance: 2,202; Referees: Maia, Nunes (POR)
28 February 2024; 19:15	Ingstad 6	(19–10)	I. Ivančok 7	Halden Arena, Halden; Attendance: 2,202; Referees: Maia, Nunes (POR)
28 February 2024; 19:15	1× (suspension)	Report	1× (suspension)	Halden Arena, Halden; Attendance: 2,202; Referees: Maia, Nunes (POR)

2 March 2024; 16:30	Switzerland	27–35	Hungary	Mobiliar Arena, Muri bei Bern; Attendance: 1,240; Referees: Weijmans, Wolbertus (NED)
2 March 2024; 16:30	Schmid 7	(16–17)	Vámos 9	Mobiliar Arena, Muri bei Bern; Attendance: 1,240; Referees: Weijmans, Wolbertus (NED)
2 March 2024; 16:30	2× (suspension)	Report	2× (suspension)	Mobiliar Arena, Muri bei Bern; Attendance: 1,240; Referees: Weijmans, Wolbertus (NED)

3 March 2024; 16:00	Austria	22–39	Norway	OlympiaWorld Innsbruck, Innsbruck; Attendance: 2,500; Referees: Merisi, Pepe (ITA)
3 March 2024; 16:00	I. Ivančok 6	(8–19)	Bakkerud 8	OlympiaWorld Innsbruck, Innsbruck; Attendance: 2,500; Referees: Merisi, Pepe (ITA)
3 March 2024; 16:00	3× (suspension)	Report	1× (yellow card) 1× (suspension)	OlympiaWorld Innsbruck, Innsbruck; Attendance: 2,500; Referees: Merisi, Pepe (ITA)

3 April 2024; 20:25	Austria	26–29	Switzerland	BSFZ Südstadt, Maria Enzersdorf; Attendance: 1,002; Referees: Praštalo, Balvan (BIH)
3 April 2024; 20:25	K. Pandza 6	(11–13)	Riner 7	BSFZ Südstadt, Maria Enzersdorf; Attendance: 1,002; Referees: Praštalo, Balvan (BIH)
3 April 2024; 20:25	2× (suspension)	Report	1× (yellow card) 2× (suspension)	BSFZ Südstadt, Maria Enzersdorf; Attendance: 1,002; Referees: Praštalo, Balvan (BIH)

4 April 2024; 19:15	Norway	33–18	Hungary	Åsane Arena, Bergen; Attendance: 2,231; Referees: Vranes, Wenninger (AUT)
4 April 2024; 19:15	Kristiansen 5	(16–11)	Győri-Lukács 6	Åsane Arena, Bergen; Attendance: 2,231; Referees: Vranes, Wenninger (AUT)
4 April 2024; 19:15	2× (suspension)	Report	1× (yellow card) 1× (suspension)	Åsane Arena, Bergen; Attendance: 2,231; Referees: Vranes, Wenninger (AUT)

6 April 2024; 15:00	Switzerland	22–42	Norway	Saalsporthalle, Zürich; Attendance: 2,388; Referees: Ilieva, Karbeska (MKD)
6 April 2024; 15:00	Emmenegger 5	(7–21)	Skogrand 7	Saalsporthalle, Zürich; Attendance: 2,388; Referees: Ilieva, Karbeska (MKD)
6 April 2024; 15:00	1× (yellow card) 2× (suspension)	Report	1× (yellow card) 2× (suspension)	Saalsporthalle, Zürich; Attendance: 2,388; Referees: Ilieva, Karbeska (MKD)

6 April 2024; 17:00	Hungary	36–30	Austria	Audi Aréna, Győr; Attendance: 1,752; Referees: Bočáková, Jánošíková (SVK)
6 April 2024; 17:00	Klujber 9	(17–13)	I. Ivančok, Neidhart 5	Audi Aréna, Győr; Attendance: 1,752; Referees: Bočáková, Jánošíková (SVK)
6 April 2024; 17:00	1× (yellow card) 5× (suspension)	Report	3× (suspension)	Audi Aréna, Győr; Attendance: 1,752; Referees: Bočáková, Jánošíková (SVK)
