= 2025 World Women's Handball Championship – European qualification =

The European qualification for the 2025 World Women's Handball Championship, in Germany and the Netherlands was played over two rounds.

In the first round of qualification, 12 teams who were not participating at the 2024 European Championship played a single round-robin with the winners advancing to the second phase, where the teams were joined by the remaining ten teams from the European Championship and played play-off games to determine the qualified teams.

== Qualification phase 1 ==
=== Seeding ===
The draw was held on 30 July in Vienna, Austria. The winner of each group advanced to the play-off round.

| Pot 1 | Pot 2 | Pot 3 |
|---|---|---|
| Italy; Greece; Kosovo; Finland | Israel; Luxembourg; Lithuania; Bosnia and Herzegovina | Bulgaria; Great Britain; Belgium; Estonia |

=== Groups ===
==== Group A ====
| Pos | Team | Pld | W | D | L | GF | GA | GD | Pts | Qualification |
|---|---|---|---|---|---|---|---|---|---|---|
| 1 | Lithuania | 2 | 2 | 0 | 0 | 62 | 47 | +15 | 4 | Qualification Phase 2 |
| 2 | Greece | 2 | 1 | 0 | 1 | 44 | 42 | +2 | 2 | |
| 3 | Great Britain | 2 | 0 | 0 | 2 | 40 | 57 | −17 | 0 | |

Source: EHF
Rules for classification: 1) points; 2) head-to-head points; 3) head-to-head goal difference; 4) head-to-head number of goals scored; 5) goal difference.

| 25 October 2024; 18:00 | Lithuania | 37–23 | Great Britain | Šiauliai Arena, Šiauliai; Attendance: 250; Referees: Härgin, Makejev (EST) |
| 25 October 2024; 18:00 | three players 6 | (18–10) | Kesselring, Thornewell 4 | Šiauliai Arena, Šiauliai; Attendance: 250; Referees: Härgin, Makejev (EST) |
| 25 October 2024; 18:00 | 1× (yellow card) 2× (suspension) | Report | 6× (suspension) | Šiauliai Arena, Šiauliai; Attendance: 250; Referees: Härgin, Makejev (EST) |

| 26 October 2024; 15:00 | Great Britain | 17–20 | Greece | Šiauliai Arena, Šiauliai; Attendance: 200; Referees: Härgin, Makejev (EST) |
| 26 October 2024; 15:00 | Thornewell 5 | (9–12) | Andritsou 8 | Šiauliai Arena, Šiauliai; Attendance: 200; Referees: Härgin, Makejev (EST) |
| 26 October 2024; 15:00 | 1× (yellow card) 3× (suspension) | Report | 2× (yellow card) 5× (suspension) | Šiauliai Arena, Šiauliai; Attendance: 200; Referees: Härgin, Makejev (EST) |

| 27 October 2024; 15:00 | Greece | 24–25 | Lithuania | Šiauliai Arena, Šiauliai; Attendance: 580; Referees: Härgin, Makejev (EST) |
| 27 October 2024; 15:00 | Andritsou, Chatziparasidou 6 | (11–11) | Arciševskaja 5 | Šiauliai Arena, Šiauliai; Attendance: 580; Referees: Härgin, Makejev (EST) |
| 27 October 2024; 15:00 | 5× (suspension) | Report | 2× (suspension) | Šiauliai Arena, Šiauliai; Attendance: 580; Referees: Härgin, Makejev (EST) |

==== Group B ====
| Pos | Team | Pld | W | D | L | GF | GA | GD | Pts | Qualification |
|---|---|---|---|---|---|---|---|---|---|---|
| 1 | Kosovo | 2 | 2 | 0 | 0 | 64 | 54 | +10 | 4 | Qualification Phase 2 |
| 2 | Belgium | 2 | 1 | 0 | 1 | 56 | 59 | −3 | 2 | |
| 3 | Bosnia and Herzegovina | 2 | 0 | 0 | 2 | 53 | 60 | −7 | 0 | |

Source: EHF
Rules for classification: 1) points; 2) head-to-head points; 3) head-to-head goal difference; 4) head-to-head number of goals scored; 5) goal difference.

| 25 October 2024; 20:00 | Belgium | 28–32 | Kosovo | Sporthal Alverberg, Hasselt; Attendance: 968; Referees: Bočáková, Jánošíková (SVK) |
| 25 October 2024; 20:00 | Antonissen 12 | (12–19) | Demaj 11 | Sporthal Alverberg, Hasselt; Attendance: 968; Referees: Bočáková, Jánošíková (SVK) |
| 25 October 2024; 20:00 | 1× (yellow card) 4× (suspension) | Report | 1× (yellow card) 5× (suspension) | Sporthal Alverberg, Hasselt; Attendance: 968; Referees: Bočáková, Jánošíková (SVK) |

| 26 October 2024; 18:00 | Kosovo | 32–26 | Bosnia and Herzegovina | Sporthal Alverberg, Hasselt; Attendance: 83; Referees: Bočáková, Jánošíková (SVK) |
| 26 October 2024; 18:00 | Demaj 13 | (18–12) | Kolašinac 8 | Sporthal Alverberg, Hasselt; Attendance: 83; Referees: Bočáková, Jánošíková (SVK) |
| 26 October 2024; 18:00 | 1× (yellow card) 7× (suspension) | Report | 2× (suspension) | Sporthal Alverberg, Hasselt; Attendance: 83; Referees: Bočáková, Jánošíková (SVK) |

| 27 October 2024; 16:00 | Bosnia and Herzegovina | 27–28 | Belgium | Sporthal Alverberg, Hasselt; Attendance: 1,115; Referees: Bočáková, Jánošíková (SVK) |
| 27 October 2024; 16:00 | three players 6 | (13–16) | Antonissen 9 | Sporthal Alverberg, Hasselt; Attendance: 1,115; Referees: Bočáková, Jánošíková (SVK) |
| 27 October 2024; 16:00 | 1× (yellow card) 3× (suspension) | Report | 1× (yellow card) 5× (suspension) | Sporthal Alverberg, Hasselt; Attendance: 1,115; Referees: Bočáková, Jánošíková (SVK) |

==== Group C ====
| Pos | Team | Pld | W | D | L | GF | GA | GD | Pts | Qualification |
|---|---|---|---|---|---|---|---|---|---|---|
| 1 | Israel | 2 | 2 | 0 | 0 | 55 | 40 | +15 | 4 | Qualification Phase 2 |
| 2 | Estonia | 2 | 0 | 1 | 1 | 46 | 53 | −7 | 1 | |
| 3 | Finland | 2 | 0 | 1 | 1 | 42 | 50 | −8 | 1 | |

Source: EHF
Rules for classification: 1) points; 2) head-to-head points; 3) head-to-head goal difference; 4) head-to-head number of goals scored; 5) goal difference.

| 24 October 2024; 17:00 | Estonia | 24–24 | Finland | Karis Idrottshall, Karis; Attendance: 350; Referees: Radčenko, Pērsis (LAT) |
| 24 October 2024; 17:00 | Molkova 9 | (12–12) | Peitsaro 6 | Karis Idrottshall, Karis; Attendance: 350; Referees: Radčenko, Pērsis (LAT) |
| 24 October 2024; 17:00 | 1× (yellow card) 2× (suspension) | Report | 2× (suspension) | Karis Idrottshall, Karis; Attendance: 350; Referees: Radčenko, Pērsis (LAT) |

| 25 October 2024; 17:00 | Israel | 29–22 | Estonia | Karis Idrottshall, Karis; Attendance: 90; Referees: Radčenko, Pērsis (LAT) |
| 25 October 2024; 17:00 | Vakrat 6 | (18–10) | Molkova, Tuusis 4 | Karis Idrottshall, Karis; Attendance: 90; Referees: Radčenko, Pērsis (LAT) |
| 25 October 2024; 17:00 | 3× (suspension) | Report | 6× (suspension) | Karis Idrottshall, Karis; Attendance: 90; Referees: Radčenko, Pērsis (LAT) |

| 26 October 2024; 15:00 | Finland | 18–26 | Israel | Karis Idrottshall, Karis; Attendance: 360; Referees: Radčenko, Pērsis (LAT) |
| 26 October 2024; 15:00 | Aarnio 4 | (7–11) | Vakrat 7 | Karis Idrottshall, Karis; Attendance: 360; Referees: Radčenko, Pērsis (LAT) |
| 26 October 2024; 15:00 | 1× (suspension) | Report | 1× (yellow card) 3× (suspension) | Karis Idrottshall, Karis; Attendance: 360; Referees: Radčenko, Pērsis (LAT) |

==== Group D ====
| Pos | Team | Pld | W | D | L | GF | GA | GD | Pts | Qualification |
|---|---|---|---|---|---|---|---|---|---|---|
| 1 | Italy | 2 | 2 | 0 | 0 | 68 | 41 | +27 | 4 | Qualification Phase 2 |
| 2 | Bulgaria | 2 | 1 | 0 | 1 | 54 | 50 | +4 | 2 | |
| 3 | Luxembourg | 2 | 0 | 0 | 2 | 41 | 72 | −31 | 0 | |

Source: EHF
Rules for classification: 1) points; 2) head-to-head points; 3) head-to-head goal difference; 4) head-to-head number of goals scored; 5) goal difference.

| 25 October 2024; 18:00 | Bulgaria | 21–29 | Italy | Pala Santa Filomena, Chieti; Attendance: 550; Referees: Jakovljević Kovačević (SRB) |
| 25 October 2024; 18:00 | Sarandeva 7 | (10–12) | Squizziato 6 | Pala Santa Filomena, Chieti; Attendance: 550; Referees: Jakovljević Kovačević (SRB) |
| 25 October 2024; 18:00 | 3× (suspension) | Report | 5× (suspension) | Pala Santa Filomena, Chieti; Attendance: 550; Referees: Jakovljević Kovačević (SRB) |

| 26 October 2024; 18:00 | Luxembourg | 21–33 | Bulgaria | Pala Santa Filomena, Chieti; Attendance: 110; Referees: Jakovljević Kovačević (SRB) |
| 26 October 2024; 18:00 | Welter 5 | (10–16) | Gencheva 12 | Pala Santa Filomena, Chieti; Attendance: 110; Referees: Jakovljević Kovačević (SRB) |
| 26 October 2024; 18:00 | 3× (suspension) | Report | 1× (yellow card) 2× (suspension) | Pala Santa Filomena, Chieti; Attendance: 110; Referees: Jakovljević Kovačević (SRB) |

| 27 October 2024; 18:30 | Italy | 39–20 | Luxembourg | Pala Santa Filomena, Chieti; Attendance: 540; Referees: Jakovljević Kovačević (SRB) |
| 27 October 2024; 18:30 | Mangone 8 | (21–11) | Wirtz 7 | Pala Santa Filomena, Chieti; Attendance: 540; Referees: Jakovljević Kovačević (SRB) |
| 27 October 2024; 18:30 | 3× (suspension) | Report | 3× (suspension) | Pala Santa Filomena, Chieti; Attendance: 540; Referees: Jakovljević Kovačević (SRB) |

== Qualification phase 2 ==
The draw took place on 15 December 2024. The four winners of phase 1 will join 18 teams. The games were played on 9 and 10 April and 12 and 13 April 2025.

=== Seeding ===
| Pot 1 | Pot 2 |
|---|---|
| Sweden; Montenegro; Poland; Slovenia; Romania; Switzerland; Spain; Austria; Czech Republic; Iceland; Faroe Islands | North Macedonia; Croatia; Turkey; Serbia; Portugal; Ukraine; Slovakia; Italy; Lithuania; Israel; Kosovo |

=== Overview ===
| Team 1 | Agg. | Team 2 | 1st leg | 2nd leg |
|---|---|---|---|---|
| Switzerland | 68–46 | Slovakia | 38–22 | 30–24 |
| Italy | 38–61 | Romania | 21–30 | 17–31 |
| Poland | 45–39 | North Macedonia | 22–18 | 23–21 |
| Sweden | 94–40 | Kosovo | 51–16 | 43–24 |
| Slovenia | 60–62 | Serbia | 29–29 | 31–33 |
| Portugal | 45–61 | Montenegro | 19–31 | 26–30 |
| Faroe Islands | 65–56 | Lithuania | 36–26 | 29–30 |
| Czech Republic | 61–46 | Ukraine | 35–19 | 26–27 |
| Croatia | 44–49 | Spain | 27–26 | 17–23 |
| Austria | 66–54 | Turkey | 36–29 | 30–25 |
| Iceland | 70–48 | Israel | 39–27 | 31–21 |

=== Matches ===
| 9 April 2025; 18:30 | Switzerland | 38–22 | Slovakia | Sportanlage Kreuzbleiche, St. Gallen; Attendance: 1,558; Referees: Picard, Vauchez (FRA) |
| 9 April 2025; 18:30 | Schmid 8 | (16–15) | Holejová 8 | Sportanlage Kreuzbleiche, St. Gallen; Attendance: 1,558; Referees: Picard, Vauchez (FRA) |
| 9 April 2025; 18:30 | 1× (yellow card) 1× (suspension) | Report | 4× (suspension) 1× (red card) | Sportanlage Kreuzbleiche, St. Gallen; Attendance: 1,558; Referees: Picard, Vauchez (FRA) |

| 13 April 2025; 16:00 | Slovakia | 24–30 | Switzerland | Mestská športová Hall, Šaľa; Attendance: 1,830; Referees: Pukšić, Satler (SLO) |
| 13 April 2025; 16:00 | Holejová 9 | (12–14) | Gautschi 8 | Mestská športová Hall, Šaľa; Attendance: 1,830; Referees: Pukšić, Satler (SLO) |
| 13 April 2025; 16:00 | 1× (yellow card) 1× (suspension) | Report | 1× (yellow card) 3× (suspension) | Mestská športová Hall, Šaľa; Attendance: 1,830; Referees: Pukšić, Satler (SLO) |

Switzerland won 68–46 on aggregate.

| 9 April 2025; 18:00 | Italy | 21–30 | Romania | Pala Santa Filomena, Chieti; Attendance: 800; Referees: Watson, Welin (SWE) |
| 9 April 2025; 18:00 | Rossomando 4 | (8–17) | four players 4 | Pala Santa Filomena, Chieti; Attendance: 800; Referees: Watson, Welin (SWE) |
| 9 April 2025; 18:00 | | Report | 2× (suspension) | Pala Santa Filomena, Chieti; Attendance: 800; Referees: Watson, Welin (SWE) |

| 13 April 2025; 18:00 | Romania | 31–17 | Italy | TeraPlast Arena, Bistrița; Attendance: 2,700; Referees: Kaluđerović, Vujačić (MNE) |
| 13 April 2025; 18:00 | Ostase 6 | (14–11) | Dalla Costa, Squizziato 3 | TeraPlast Arena, Bistrița; Attendance: 2,700; Referees: Kaluđerović, Vujačić (MNE) |
| 13 April 2025; 18:00 | 4× (suspension) | Report | 1× (suspension) | TeraPlast Arena, Bistrița; Attendance: 2,700; Referees: Kaluđerović, Vujačić (MNE) |

Romania won 61–38 on aggregate.

| 9 April 2025; 20:30 | Poland | 22–18 | North Macedonia | Hala Widowiskowo Sportowa, Koszalin; Attendance: 2,500; Referees: Murariu, Paraschiv (ROU) |
| 9 April 2025; 20:30 | Promis 7 | (14–8) | Ristovska 9 | Hala Widowiskowo Sportowa, Koszalin; Attendance: 2,500; Referees: Murariu, Paraschiv (ROU) |
| 9 April 2025; 20:30 | 6× (suspension) | Report | 1× (suspension) | Hala Widowiskowo Sportowa, Koszalin; Attendance: 2,500; Referees: Murariu, Paraschiv (ROU) |

| 12 April 2025; 19:00 | North Macedonia | 21–23 | Poland | Boro Čurlevski Sports Hall, Bitola; Attendance: 3,000; Referees: Hatipoğlu, Şimşek (TUR) |
| 12 April 2025; 19:00 | Damjanoska 5 | (10–10) | Balsam 7 | Boro Čurlevski Sports Hall, Bitola; Attendance: 3,000; Referees: Hatipoğlu, Şimşek (TUR) |
| 12 April 2025; 19:00 | 2× (suspension) | Report | 4× (suspension) | Boro Čurlevski Sports Hall, Bitola; Attendance: 3,000; Referees: Hatipoğlu, Şimşek (TUR) |

Poland won 45–39 on aggregate.

| 10 April 2025; 19:00 | Sweden | 51–16 | Kosovo | Brinova Arena, Karlskrona; Attendance: 2,440; Referees: Harðarson, Magnússon (ISL) |
| 10 April 2025; 19:00 | Hagman, Lerby 7 | (28–8) | Qorraj 5 | Brinova Arena, Karlskrona; Attendance: 2,440; Referees: Harðarson, Magnússon (ISL) |
| 10 April 2025; 19:00 | 1× (yellow card) 3× (suspension) | Report | 3× (suspension) | Brinova Arena, Karlskrona; Attendance: 2,440; Referees: Harðarson, Magnússon (ISL) |

| 13 April 2025; 17:15 | Kosovo | 24–43 | Sweden | Palace of Youth and Sports, Pristina; Attendance: 550; Referees: Pavićević, Martinović (MNE) |
| 13 April 2025; 17:15 | Qorraj 11 | (9–24) | Lerby 7 | Palace of Youth and Sports, Pristina; Attendance: 550; Referees: Pavićević, Martinović (MNE) |
| 13 April 2025; 17:15 | 1× (red card) | Report | 1× (yellow card) 2× (suspension) | Palace of Youth and Sports, Pristina; Attendance: 550; Referees: Pavićević, Martinović (MNE) |

Sweden won 94–40 on aggregate.

| 9 April 2025; 18:00 | Slovenia | 29–29 | Serbia | Golovec Hall, Celje; Attendance: 1,500; Referees: Lovin, Stancu (ROU) |
| 9 April 2025; 18:00 | Stanko 14 | (14–13) | Lekić 7 | Golovec Hall, Celje; Attendance: 1,500; Referees: Lovin, Stancu (ROU) |
| 9 April 2025; 18:00 | 1× (yellow card) 3× (suspension) | Report | 6× (suspension) | Golovec Hall, Celje; Attendance: 1,500; Referees: Lovin, Stancu (ROU) |

| 13 April 2025; 18:00 | Serbia | 33–31 | Slovenia | Ustanova Sportski Centar Bor, Bor; Attendance: 3,000; Referees: Weijmans, Wolbertus (NED) |
| 13 April 2025; 18:00 | Krpež Šlezak 8 | (16–16) | Stanko 10 | Ustanova Sportski Centar Bor, Bor; Attendance: 3,000; Referees: Weijmans, Wolbertus (NED) |
| 13 April 2025; 18:00 | 1× (yellow card) 3× (suspension) | Report | 2× (yellow card) 3× (suspension) | Ustanova Sportski Centar Bor, Bor; Attendance: 3,000; Referees: Weijmans, Wolbertus (NED) |

Serbia won 62–60 on aggregate.

| 9 April 2025; 20:00 | Portugal | 19–31 | Montenegro | Pavilhão Multiusos De Fafe, Fafe; Attendance: 1,100; Referees: Cournil, Lamour (FRA) |
| 9 April 2025; 20:00 | Figueiredo 6 | (11–14) | Brnović, Pletikosić 6 | Pavilhão Multiusos De Fafe, Fafe; Attendance: 1,100; Referees: Cournil, Lamour (FRA) |
| 9 April 2025; 20:00 | 3× (suspension) | Report | 1× (yellow card) 2× (suspension) 1× (red card) | Pavilhão Multiusos De Fafe, Fafe; Attendance: 1,100; Referees: Cournil, Lamour (FRA) |

| 12 April 2025; 18:00 | Montenegro | 30–26 | Portugal | Bemax Arena, Podgorica; Attendance: 2,245; Referees: Brodić, Hodžić (CRO) |
| 12 April 2025; 18:00 | Vukčević 8 | (16–13) | Figueiredo 8 | Bemax Arena, Podgorica; Attendance: 2,245; Referees: Brodić, Hodžić (CRO) |
| 12 April 2025; 18:00 | 1× (yellow card) 2× (suspension) | Report | 3× (suspension) | Bemax Arena, Podgorica; Attendance: 2,245; Referees: Brodić, Hodžić (CRO) |

Montenegro won 61–45 on aggregate.

| 9 April 2025; 20:00 | Faroe Islands | 36–26 | Lithuania | Við Tjarnir, Tórshavn; Attendance: 2,748; Referees: Uhlíř, Beňuš (CZE) |
| 9 April 2025; 20:00 | Mittún 9 | (15–11) | Pilikauskaitė 9 | Við Tjarnir, Tórshavn; Attendance: 2,748; Referees: Uhlíř, Beňuš (CZE) |
| 9 April 2025; 20:00 | 1× (yellow card) 3× (suspension) 1× (red card) | Report | 1× (yellow card) 2× (suspension) | Við Tjarnir, Tórshavn; Attendance: 2,748; Referees: Uhlíř, Beňuš (CZE) |

| 13 April 2025; 15:00 | Lithuania | 30–29 | Faroe Islands | Jonava Sports Arena, Jonava; Attendance: 800; Referees: Kinnari, Skogberg (FIN) |
| 13 April 2025; 15:00 | Pilikauskaitė 10 | (14–11) | Halsdóttir, Poulsen 5 | Jonava Sports Arena, Jonava; Attendance: 800; Referees: Kinnari, Skogberg (FIN) |
| 13 April 2025; 15:00 | 1× (yellow card) 3× (suspension) 1× (red card) | Report | 5× (suspension) | Jonava Sports Arena, Jonava; Attendance: 800; Referees: Kinnari, Skogberg (FIN) |

Faroe Islands won 65–56 on aggregate.

| 10 April 2025; 17:15 | Czech Republic | 35–19 | Ukraine | Rocknet aréna, Chomutov; Attendance: 1,507; Referees: Pagh, Thygesen (DEN) |
| 10 April 2025; 17:15 | Korešová 7 | (17–12) | Shukal 6 | Rocknet aréna, Chomutov; Attendance: 1,507; Referees: Pagh, Thygesen (DEN) |
| 10 April 2025; 17:15 | 1× (yellow card) 2× (suspension) | Report | 5× (suspension) | Rocknet aréna, Chomutov; Attendance: 1,507; Referees: Pagh, Thygesen (DEN) |

| 13 April 2025; 18:00 | Ukraine | 27–26 | Czech Republic | Jonava Sports Arena, Jonava, Lithuania (Note: Due to the Russian invasion of Ukraine, the Ukrainian team play their home match at a neutral venue.); Attendance: 200; Referees: Lidacka, Lesiak (POL) |
| 13 April 2025; 18:00 | Shukal 7 | (11–15) | Korešová 6 | Jonava Sports Arena, Jonava, Lithuania; Attendance: 200; Referees: Lidacka, Lesiak (POL) |
| 13 April 2025; 18:00 | 2× (yellow card) 5× (suspension) | Report | 3× (suspension) | Jonava Sports Arena, Jonava, Lithuania; Attendance: 200; Referees: Lidacka, Lesiak (POL) |

Czech Republic won 61–46 on aggregate.

| 10 April 2025; 17:30 | Croatia | 27–26 | Spain | ŠSD "Josip Samaržija-Bepo", Koprivnica; Attendance: 2,000; Referees: Gasmi, Gasmi (FRA) |
| 10 April 2025; 17:30 | Barišić 8 | (17–12) | So Delgado, Fernández 5 | ŠSD "Josip Samaržija-Bepo", Koprivnica; Attendance: 2,000; Referees: Gasmi, Gasmi (FRA) |
| 10 April 2025; 17:30 | 5× (suspension) 1× (red card) | Report | 3× (suspension) | ŠSD "Josip Samaržija-Bepo", Koprivnica; Attendance: 2,000; Referees: Gasmi, Gasmi (FRA) |

| 13 April 2025; 12:00 | Spain | 23–17 | Croatia | Ciudad de Algeciras - Doctor Juan Carlos Mateo, Algeciras; Attendance: 1,900; Referees: Cipov, Klus (SVK) |
| 13 April 2025; 12:00 | So Delgado 8 | (9–7) | Barišić, Milosavljević 4 | Ciudad de Algeciras - Doctor Juan Carlos Mateo, Algeciras; Attendance: 1,900; Referees: Cipov, Klus (SVK) |
| 13 April 2025; 12:00 | 2× (suspension) | Report | 1× (yellow card) 7× (suspension) | Ciudad de Algeciras - Doctor Juan Carlos Mateo, Algeciras; Attendance: 1,900; Referees: Cipov, Klus (SVK) |

Spain won 49–44 on aggregate.

| 10 April 2025; 18:00 | Austria | 36–29 | Turkey | Multiversum Schwechat, Schwechat; Attendance: 1,253; Referees: Backović, Palačković (SLO) |
| 10 April 2025; 18:00 | Reichert 10 | (13–13) | İskit 8 | Multiversum Schwechat, Schwechat; Attendance: 1,253; Referees: Backović, Palačković (SLO) |
| 10 April 2025; 18:00 | 1× (yellow card) 3× (suspension) | Report | 1× (yellow card) 6× (suspension) | Multiversum Schwechat, Schwechat; Attendance: 1,253; Referees: Backović, Palačković (SLO) |

| 13 April 2025; 18:00 | Turkey | 25–30 | Austria | Amasya Spor Salonu, Amasya; Attendance: 3,000; Referees: Vujačić, Kažanegra (MNE) |
| 13 April 2025; 18:00 | Öztürk 10 | (11–14) | Schlegel, Stankovic 6 | Amasya Spor Salonu, Amasya; Attendance: 3,000; Referees: Vujačić, Kažanegra (MNE) |
| 13 April 2025; 18:00 | 1× (suspension) | Report | 4× (suspension) | Amasya Spor Salonu, Amasya; Attendance: 3,000; Referees: Vujačić, Kažanegra (MNE) |

Austria won 66–54 on aggregate.

| 9 April 2025; 21:30 | Iceland | 39–27 | Israel | Reykjavík; Attendance: 0 Referees: Radčenko, Pērsis (LAT) |
| 9 April 2025; 21:30 | Ásgeirsdóttir 10 | (20–10) | Shaul 9 | Reykjavík; Attendance: 0 Referees: Radčenko, Pērsis (LAT) |
| 9 April 2025; 21:30 | 1× (yellow card) 2× (suspension) | Report | 1× (suspension) | Reykjavík; Attendance: 0 Referees: Radčenko, Pērsis (LAT) |

| 10 April 2025; 21:30 | Israel | 21–31 | Iceland | Reykjavík, Iceland (Note: Due to the Gaza war, the Israelian team play their home match at a neutral venue.); Attendance: 0 Referees: Radčenko, Pērsis (LAT) |
| 10 April 2025; 21:30 | Vakrat 6 | (11–16) | Ásgeirsdóttir 8 | Reykjavík, Iceland; Attendance: 0 Referees: Radčenko, Pērsis (LAT) |
| 10 April 2025; 21:30 | 3× (suspension) | Report | 3× (suspension) | Reykjavík, Iceland; Attendance: 0 Referees: Radčenko, Pērsis (LAT) |

Iceland won 70–48 on aggregate.
