= EHF Challenge Trophy =

The EHF Challenge Trophy is an international handball tournament for developing handball nations.

There is both a male and female tournament.

== Men's tournaments ==
Year	Final			Third place match		
Year	Champion	Score	Second place	Third place	Score	Fourth place
1999	Cyprus	21–20	Moldova	Great Britain	30–20	Armenia
2001	Latvia	31–22	Estonia	Moldova	27–25	Cyprus
2003	Moldova	32–19	Azerbaijan	Great Britain	19–16	Malta
2005	Moldova	29–27	Azerbaijan	Scotland	24–18	England
2007	Georgia	28–27	Luxembourg	Faroe Islands		–
2009	Finland	30–28	Georgia	Moldova	–	Malta
2012	Moldova	30–28	Faroe Islands	Azerbaijan		Georgia

== Women's tournaments ==
Year	Final			Third place match		
Year	Champion	Score	Second place	Third place	Score	Fourth place
2000	Bosnia and Herzegovina	30–26	Belgium	Finland	–	Latvia
2002	Azerbaijan	26–18	Greece	Belgium	19–18	Israel
2004	Italy	30–22	Faroe Islands	Finland	29–23	Israel
2006	Bosnia and Herzegovina	40–24	Faroe Islands	Cyprus	23–18	Georgia
2008	Finland	25–17	Faroe Islands	Bosnia and Herzegovina	23–16	Great Britain
2010	Finland	28–26	Israel	Faroe Islands	–	Cyprus
2012	Bulgaria	36–27	Faroe Islands	Israel	39–28	Latvia
2014	Bulgaria	34–23	Israel	Greece	23–16	Belgium
2016	Faroe Islands	28–14	Georgia	Latvia	30–21	Belgium
2018	Bosnia and Herzegovina	27–26	Belgium	Luxembourg	22–21	Estonia

== See also ==
- IHF Emerging Nations Championship
