= Jóhan Hansen =

Faroese-Danish handball player (born 1994)

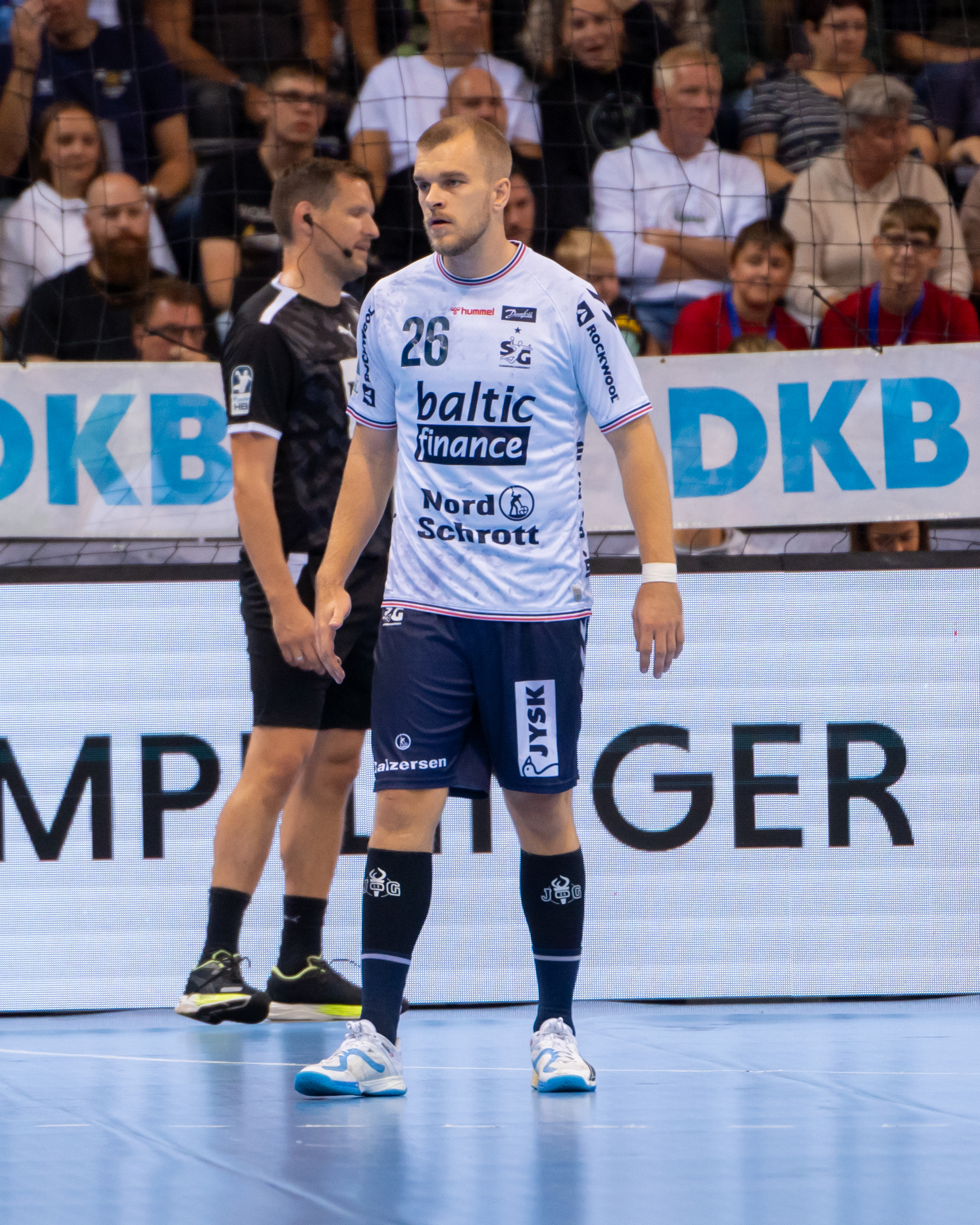
- Hansen in 2024

Personal information
- Full name: Jóhan á Plógv Hansen
- Nationality: Faroese; Danish
- Born: 1 May 1994 (age 32) Tórshavn, Faroe Islands
- Height: 1.90 m (6 ft 3 in)

Sport
- Sport: Handball
- Position: Right wing
- Current club: SG Flensburg-Handewitt

Youth career
- Years: Team
- 1999–2010: Kyndil
- 2010–2011: SHEA

Senior clubs
- Years: Team
- 2011–2015: Skanderborg Håndbold
- 2015–2020: Bjerringbro-Silkeborg
- 2020–2022: TSV Hannover-Burgdorf
- 2022–2025: SG Flensburg-Handewitt
- 2025–: Skanderborg AGF Håndbold
National team
Years	Team	Apps	(Gls)
2011–2012	Faroe Islands	4	(18)
2015–	Denmark	119	(231)
Medal record
Men's handball
Representing Denmark
Olympic Games
Silver medal – second place	2020 Tokyo	Team
World Championship
Gold medal – first place	2019 Germany/Denmark
Gold medal – first place	2021 Egypt
Gold medal – first place	2023 Poland/Sweden
Gold medal – first place	2025 Croatia/Denmark/Norway
European Championship
Gold medal – first place	2026 Denmark/Norway/Sweden
Silver medal – second place	2024 Germany
Bronze medal – third place	2022 Hungary/Slovakia
Junior World Championship
Silver medal – second place	2015 Brazil
- Updated on 1 February 2026

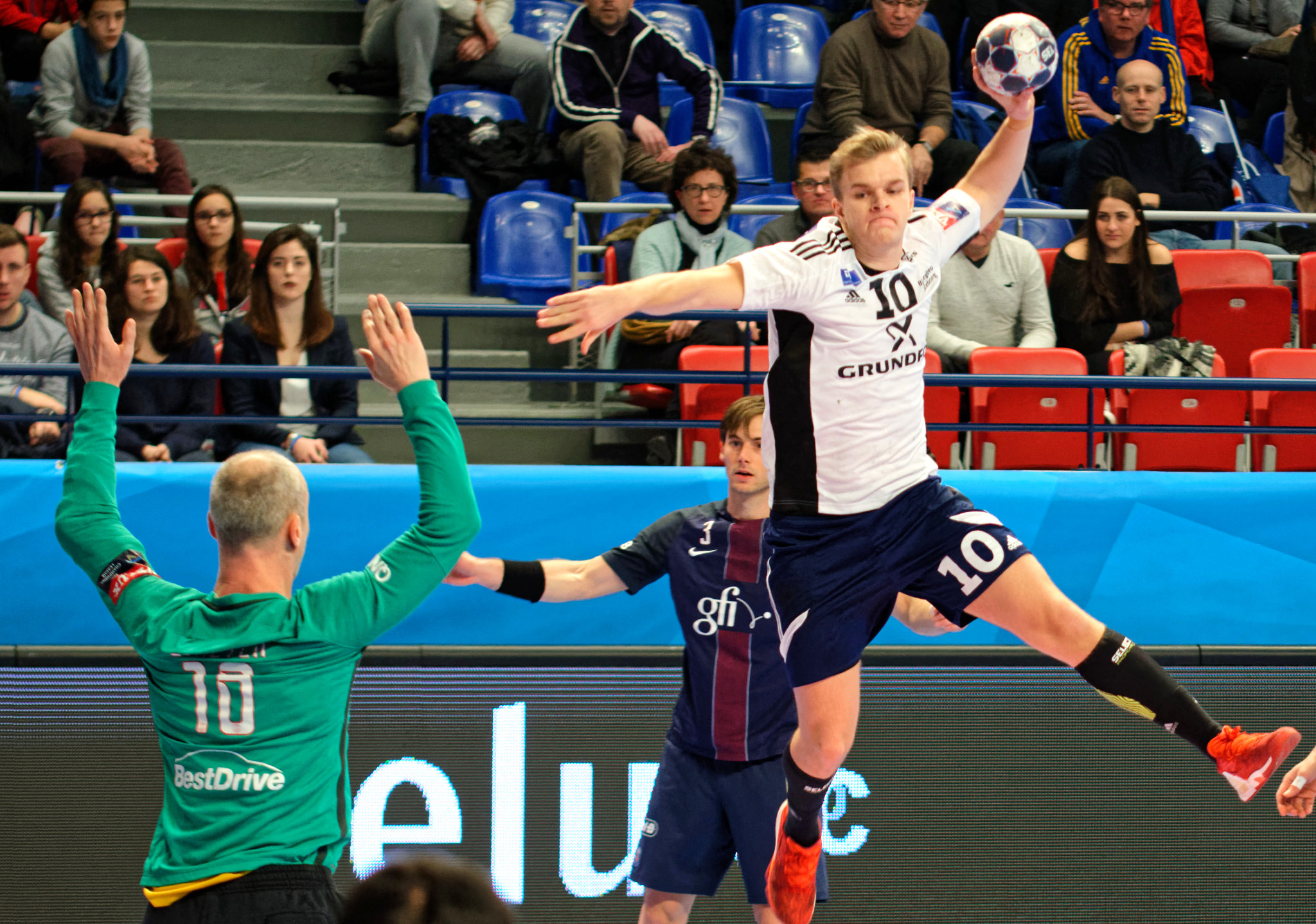
Hansen in 2017

Jóhan á Plógv Hansen (born 1 May 1994) is a Faroese handball player for SG Flensburg-Handewitt and the Danish national team.

He has previously represented Faroe Islands national team, but due to the structure of the Danish Realm Greenlandic and Faeroese players can themselves decide which national team they wish to represent. As Hansen had already played for Faroe Islands national team, his wishes to representing the Danish national team resulted in a two-year suspension from international handball. Former Danish national coach Ulrik Wilbek expressed that he hoped and wished for Jóhan Hansen to change his nationality in order to be available for the Danish national team.

== Club career ==
=== Childhood and youth ===
Hansen started his handball career with the Faroese club Kyndil in Thórshavn at the age of 4, coached by his aunt Marjun á Plógv. Until the age of 10 he played as a goal keeper just like his aunt, but then he changed to play as right backcourt. He played football alongside his handball, he played with Havnar Bóltfelag (HB Tórshavn) and made the cut for the Faroe Islands U15 national football team. In the end, he stuck with handball.

=== Skanderborg Håndbold ===
In 2010 he was selected to join SHEA – Skanderborg Håndbold Elite Academy and moved to Denmark shortly after turning 16 years old. In the 2014–15 season he was the topscorer for Skanderborg.

=== Bjerringbro-Silkeborg ===
On 3 March 2015 it was announced that Johan Hansen would join Bjerringbro-Silkeborg on a three-year contract, starting at the 2015–16 season. The transfer meant that Johan Hansen was bought free of his contract with Skanderborg Håndbold, with whom he had one year left on his contract.

=== TSV Hannover-Burgdorf ===
For the 2020–21 season he joined German team TSV Hannover-Burgdorf. In his first season he was the second best goalscorer for his team behind Ivan Martinovic.

=== Flensburg-Handewitt ===
For the 2022–23 season he signed a three-year deal with SG Flensburg-Handewitt to replace Lasse Svan, who had recently retired. With Flensburg-Handewitt he won the 2024 and 2025 EHF European League.

=== Return to Denmark ===
For the 2025-26 Hansen returned to Denmark and Skanderborg Aarhus Håndbold, where he signed a three-year contract with the club. In the 2025-26 season he reached the final of the Danish Championship with the club, the first in club history. The same season he was included in the Danish League all-star team.

== National team career ==
In 2012, he represented Faroe Islands in the 2012 EHF Challenge Trophy. They made it all the way to final, where they lost to Moldova.

Jóhan á Plógv Hansen won silver with the Danish national U21 handball team in 2015 in Brazil. He was chosen as one of the best players and became one of the All Star team as the best right wing player.

On 29 May 2015, he was called up to the Danish national team as a part of the squad in the 2016 European Men's Handball Championship qualification. He made his debut for the Danish national team on 10 June 2015 in a match against Lithuania.

After switching allegiance, Jóhan á Plógv Hansen became a regular with Denmark and he was part of the teams winning a record-breaking three consecutive World Championship: on home soil (shared host with Germany) in 2019, in Egypt in 2021, and in Poland and Sweden in 2023.

At the 2026 European Men's Handball Championship he won gold medals, meaning that Denmark held both the World, European and Olympic titles at the same time, as only the second team ever after France's 'Les Experts'.

== Honours ==
- World Championship
  - Gold: 2025
  - Gold: 2023
  - Gold: 2021
  - Gold: 2019
- EHF Challenge Trophy
  - Silver: 2012
- Danish Championship:
  - Gold: 2016
  - Silver: 2026
- EHF European League:
  - Gold: 2024, 2025
