= Arena Shumen =

Indoor arena in Shumen, Bulgaria

Coordinates: 43.2794°N 26.9259°E

- Interactive map of Arena Shumen
- Location: Shumen, Bulgaria
- Capacity: 1,494; Concerts: 2,500
- Parking: 300 spaces

Construction
- Built: 22 February 2017
- Opened: 21 July 2018
- Renovated: 2025
- Cost: BGN 8.5 million EUR 4.3 million

Tenants
- BC Shumen (NBL); HC Shumen 61 (GHR A); HC Shumen 98

Website
- arenashumen.com

Arena Shumen (Bulgarian: Арена Шумен) is an indoor arena located in Shumen, Bulgaria that opened on July 21, 2018. It has a seating capacity of 1,494 people, expandable to over 2,500 for concerts.

== Construction ==
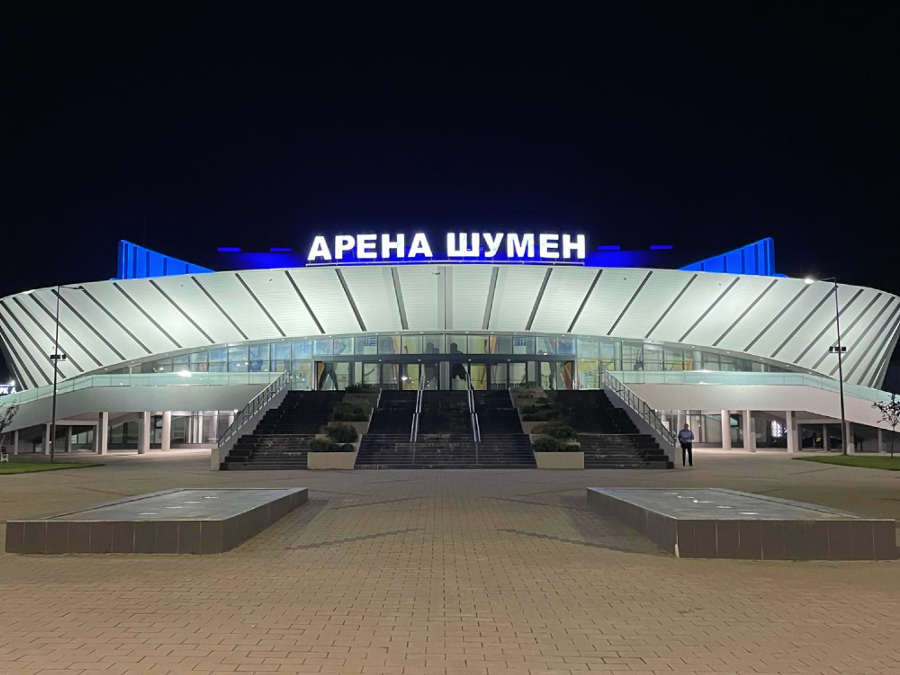
Arena Shumen at night (2024)

Construction of the arena took one and a half years and cost 8.5 million Bulgarian lev, while landscaping and development of the surroundings cost around 4 million lev, taking the total price to around 13 million lev. This led to controversy in 2020 when it was reported that the Arena's annual revenues for 2019 were under 30,000 lev.

== Reception ==
In 2018, the arena won Sports Building of the Year as part of Bulgarian construction magazine Gradat's Building of the Year awards.

== Tenants ==
The arena has been the home of BC Shumen of the NBL since 2021. Beyond basketball, it also hosts most matches of the HC Shumen 61 and HC Shumen 98 (Women's) handball teams and is suitable for volleyball, and others.

=== Major events ===
Since opening in 2018, the arena has hosted numerous sports and entertainment events, including wrestling, fencing, rhythmic gymnastics, and Kyokushin tournaments, as well as shows by Neshka Robeva (2019), Dimitar Rachkov (2020), and Lili Ivanova (2021), among others. In December 2024, the arena hosted both the Sukhishvili Georgian National Ballet and the Schönbrunn Palace Orchestra.

Since 2023, Arena Shumen has hosted the Shumen Open international rapid and blitz chess tournament. The 2024 edition was largest chess event of the year in Bulgaria, with 240 participants from 12 countries.

On 15 October 2023, the arena hosted its first international match - a European Women's Handball Championship qualifier between Bulgaria and Montenegro.

=== International matches ===
Senior teams only.

==== Bulgaria women's national handball team ====
Date	Result	Opponent	Competition	Attendance
15 October 2023	20–34	Montenegro	European Championship qualification	1,000
28 February 2024	24–30	Turkey	European Championship qualification	1,650
3 April 2024	17–35	Serbia	European Championship qualification	562

== See also ==
- List of indoor arenas in Bulgaria
