= Armina Isić =

Bosnia and Hezegovina handball player (born 1995)

Personal information
- Nationality: Bosnia and Herzegovinian
- Born: 6 December 1995 (age 30) Mostar, Bosnia and Herzegovina
- Height: 1.80 m (5 ft 11 in)

Sport
- Sport: Handball
- Position: Left back
- Current club: Yalıkavak
- Number: 9

Senior clubs
- Years: Team
- 2013–2014: ŽRK Lokomotiva Mostar
- 2016: ŽRK Neretva Jablanica
- 2017: OŽRK Jedinstvo-AtlasRelax Tuzla
- 2017–2018: Osmangazi Bld. SK
- 2018–2019: CB Salud Tenerife
- 2020–2021: CB Adesal Córdoba
- 2021–2022: CB Zonzamas Lanzarote
- 2022–2023: Toulon Saint-Cyr Var
- 2023–2024: CS Dacia Mioveni 2012
- 2024–: Yalıkavak
National team
- Years: Team
- 2021–: Bosnia and Herzegovina

Armina Isić (born 6 December 1995) is a professional handball player from Bosnia and Herzegovina. She plays as the left back for Yalıkavak in the Turkish Super League and the Bosnia and Herzegovina national team.

== Personal life ==
Armina Isić was born in Mostar, Bosnia and Herzegovina on 6 December 1995.

== Club career ==
Isıc is 1.80 m (5 ft 11 in) tall, and plays in the left back position.

She started her career at ŽRK Lokomotiva Mostar in her hometown, where she excelled in the junior category.. Subsequently, she played for ŽRK Neretva Jablanica, and OŽRK Jedinstvo-AtlasRelax Tuzla, in her country.

As her first foreign country experience, Isic went to Turkey end July 2017, and signed a one-year contract with the Bursa-based club Osmangazi Bld. SK for the 2017–18 Super League season. In the 2018–19 season, she was with CB Salud Tenerife in Spain, where she scored 192 goals with an average of 8 goals per game. She was instrumental for her team's promotion to the upper-level league. She then transferred to CB Adesal Córdoba in the Liga Guerreras Iberdrola, and later to CB Zonzamas Lanzarote also in the Canary Islands. In January 2022, she went to France, and signed a two-year deal with Toulon Saint-Cyr Var to play in the LFH Division 1 Féminine. The next season, she was with CS Dacia Mioveni 2012 in Romania. In 2024, she moved once again to Turkey, and joined the Super League-club Yalıkavak in Muğla. She won the champion title at the end of the season play-offs.

== International career ==
Isıc is a member of the Bosnia and Herzegovina women's national handball team. She took part at the European Women's Handball Championship qualification matches of 2022, and 2024.

== Honours ==
Turkish Women's Handball Super League

Yalıkavak SK
Champions (1): 2024–25
