= Polina Gencheva =

Bulgarian handball player (born 1998)

Polina Ivanova Gencheva
Personal information
- Nationality: Bulgarian; Norwegian
- Born: 11 November 1998 (age 27) Veliko Tarnovo, Bulgaria
- Height: 1.74 m (5 ft 9 in)

Sport
- Sport: Handball
- Position: Left wing
- Current club: Larvik HK
- Number: 23

Youth career
- Years: Team
- –: Handball Club Etar 64

Senior clubs
- Years: Team
- 2014–2015: Handball Club Etar 64
- 2015–2018: IL Runar
- 2018–2022: Sandefjord TIF
- 2022–2024: Larvik HK
- 2024–: Pors Håndball
National team
Years	Team	Apps	(Gls)
2022–	Bulgaria	6	(29)

Polina Gencheva (born 11 November 1998) is a Bulgarian-Norwegian handball player for Larvik HK and the Bulgarian national team.

== Achievements ==
- Norwegian Cup:
  - Bronze Medalist: 2023/2024
