= Jana Mittún =

Faroese handball player (born 2003)

Personal information
- Nationality: Faroese
- Born: 24 November 2003 (age 22) Hoyvík, Faroe Islands
- Height: 1.72 m (5 ft 8 in)

Sport
- Sport: Handball
- Position: Centre back
- Current club: Viborg HK
- Number: 77

Youth career
- Years: Team
- –: H71

Senior clubs
- Years: Team
- –2023: H71
- 2023–2027: Viborg HK
- 2027-: NFH
National team
Years	Team	Apps	(Gls)
2021–	Faroe Islands	42	(199)

Jana Mittún (born 24 November 2003) is a Faroese handball player for Viborg HK and the Faroese national team.

== Career ==
She joined Danish side Viborg HK in 2023. In 2025 she extended her contract until 2028 despite interest from other clubs.

She participated with the Faroese national team at the 2024 European Women's Handball Championship in Hungary, Switzerland and Austria, placing 17th overall. This was the first time, the Faroe Islands qualified for a major international championship.

At the 2025 World Championship she was part of the Faroe Islands team that played for the first time at a World Championship. With wins over Spain and Paraguay they advanced from the preliminary groups and recorded their first ever win at a major international tournament.

In September 2026 it was announced, that Mittún will join the Danish rivals from Nykøbing Falster Håndboldklub for the 2027–28 season.

== Personal life ==
Mittún is the cousin of handball playing brothers Elias and Rói Ellefsen á Skipagøtu. Her older brother Pauli Mittún and younger brother Óli Mittún are also handball players. With wins over Spain and Paraguay they advanced from the preliminary groups and recorded their first ever win at a major international tournament.
