= Aušra Arciševskaja =

Lithuanian handball player

Personal information
- Nationality: Lithuanian
- Born: June 6, 2001 (age 25)

Sport
- Sport: Handball
- Position: Back Wing
- Current club: Eglė Vilnius
- Number: 33
National team
- Years: Team
- –: Lithuania

Aušra Arciševskaja (born 6 June 2001) is a Lithuanian handball player who plays for Eglė Vilnius and the Lithuania national handball team.

In 2019 Aušra was awarded Lithuanian female handball player of the year award.
