= Tabea Schmid =

Swiss handball player

Personal information
- Nationality: Swiss
- Born: 14 August 2003 (age 23) St. Gallen, Switzerland
- Height: 1.75 m (5 ft 9 in)

Sport
- Sport: Handball
- Position: Pivot
- Current club: Team Esbjerg
- Number: 7

Youth career
- Years: Team
- –: SV Fides

Senior clubs
- Years: Team
- 2019–2023: LC Brühl Handball
- 2021–2022: →ATH (loan)
- 2023–2025: København Håndbold
- 2025–: Team Esbjerg
National team
Years	Team	Apps	(Gls)
2021–	Switzerland	55	(290)

Tabea Schmid (born 14 August 2003) is a Swiss female handballer for Danish club Team Esbjerg and the Swiss national team.

Schmid made her official debut on the Swiss national team on 20 March 2021, against Faroe Islands. She represented Switzerland for the first time at the 2022 European Women's Handball Championship in Slovenia, Montenegro and North Macedonia, where she scored 13 goals on 3 matches.

In the 2024-25 season she became the first Swiss player ever to be the top scorer in the Danish league.

== Achievements ==
- SPAR Premium League
  - Bronze Medalist: 2022
- Danish Championship:
  - Winner: 2026
