= Bosnia and Herzegovina women's national handball team =

History and results of Bosnia and Herzegovina women's national team

Bosnia and Herzegovina

Information
- Nickname: Zmajevi (Dragons)
- Association: Handball Federation of Bosnia and Herzegovina
- Coach: Adnan Bašić
- Assistant coach: Omer Šabić
- Captain: Slađana Topić and Armina Isić
- Most goals: Edina Demić
- Ranking: #27

Colours
1st	2nd

Results

World Championship
- Appearances: 0
- Last updated on Unknown.

The women's handball team of Bosnia and Herzegovina represents Bosnia and Herzegovina in international women's handball competitions. It is governed by the Handball Association of Bosnia and Herzegovina.

== History ==
When Bosnia and Herzegovina became independent in 1992, the Handball Federation of Bosnia became the national handball governing body in the country, joining the European Handball Federation and the International Handball Federation. That same year, the federation established the first official women's national handball team to represent the newly independent nation in international competitions.

After a 13-year absence from competition, the senior women's national team was reassembled in Lukavac on 15 March 2021. Radan Rovčanin was selected as the team's coach.

== 2022 European Women's Handball Championship qualification ==
=== Greece-Bosnia ===
In their first match for the European Championship in 2022, Bosnia and Herzegovina faced the Greece women's national handball team, who secured a 29-18 victory. The top scorers for Greece were Maria Chatziparasidou and Vailiki Gkatziou, scoring six goals each. For Bosnia and Herzegovina, Armina Isić led with five goals, followed by Marija Gudelj scoring four times.

=== Bosnia-Italy ===
In their second match, Bosnia and Herzegovina defeated Italy with a score of 25-22 at the qualification tournament held in Greece. This marked the first official win for the women's national team in 14 years, following their long period of inactivity, returning Bosnia and Herzegovina to the EHF list.

=== Latvia-Bosnia ===
In their third match, Bosnia and Herzegovina defeated Latvia with a score of 31–19.

Following the conclusion of the tournament in Greece, coach Radan Rovčanin commented:

We finished this tournament. I hope the Handball Federation of Bosnia and Herzegovina is satisfied. The girls showed that they have character and we have to believe in them. I am most happy for them, I hope they will give better results in the next cycle. I am really satisfied with everything. I would like to thank the RSBiH Board of Directors for the conditions. I hope we will not stop at this because BiH has material to look forward to in the future. This will also be a motive for clubs in BiH. I am proud of this group of girls.

== World Championship qualification in 2023 ==
In 2023, the Bosnia and Herzegovina women's national handball team participated in the first phase of qualification for the 2023 World Women's Handball Championship, which is scheduled to be held in Sweden, Denmark, and Norway. Ahead of the qualifiers, the team underwent a coaching change. Alma Čehajić Hadžović was appointed as the new head coach, replacing Radan Rovčanin.

In the first round of qualification, Bosnia and Herzegovina played against Greece in a two-legged tie, with both matches taking place in Cazin at the JU Sportski centar "Salih Omerčević". The first match ended with a narrow 23–21 victory for Greece. In the second leg, Bosnia and Herzegovina secured a 22–21 win. However, the overall result was not sufficient to advance to the next round of qualification, as Greece progressed on aggregate.

== Qualifications for the 2024 European Women's Handball Championship ==
In April 2023, the Bosnia and Herzegovina women's national handball team was drawn into a qualifying group for the 2024 European Women's Handball Championship, alongside Croatia, Romania, and Greece. Adnan Bašić, head coach of ŽRK Krivaja, was appointed as the selector of the national team.

=== Romania-Bosnia ===
On 12 October 2023, Bosnia and Herzegovina faced Romania at the Sala Sporturilor Mioveni. The match ended in a heavy defeat for Bosnia and Herzegovina, with a final score of 49–18, after trailing 26–11 at halftime.

The match drew media and online attention due to an unusual incident in which a Bosnian player mistakenly passed the ball to the referee instead of a teammate. The referee caught the ball, momentarily confused, before returning it to the Bosnian players, allowing play to resume.

=== Bosnia-Croatia ===
In their next qualifier, Bosnia and Herzegovina suffered a second defeat, losing to Croatia with a score of 31–17. The match was held in Cazin, at the JU Sportski centar "Salih Omerčević". Ana Vrančić and Armina Isić were the top scorers for Bosnia and Herzegovina with four goals each, while Edina Demić scored three times. For Croatia, Nikolina Zadravec, Dejana Milosavljević, and Andrea Šimara each scored five goals, leading their team to victory.

== Current squad ==
No.	Pos.	Name	Date of birth (age)	Height	App.	Goals	Club
27	LB	Armina Isić	(Age 21)	180 cm		22	(Romania) CS Dacia Mioveni 2012
4	RB	Edina Demić	(Age 26)	182 cm		73	(France) Le Pouzin HB07
9	CB	Desire Kolašinac	(Age 32)	178 cm		23	(Germany) SG Kappel Windeck
10	LB	Azra Topić	(Age 27)	163 cm		19	(Bosnia and Herzegovina) Krajina
7	RW	Ana Vrančić	(Age 30)	170 cm		16	(Greece) A.C. PAOK
39	RW	Slađana Andrić	(Age 20)	170 cm		3	(Bosnia and Herzegovina) ZRK Borac
14	CB	Adelisa Dautović	(Age 23)	163 cm		4	(Bosnia and Herzegovina) Krajina
26	LW	Martina Pandža	(Age 24)	159 cm		1	(Bosnia and Herzegovina) ZRK Zrinjski
40	LP	Nejra Cerić	(Age 22)	173 cm		0	(Bosnia and Herzegovina) ZRK Krivaja
34	LP	Amela Džamkić	(Age 21)	188 cm		19	(North Macedonia) WHC Cair Skopje
2	LP	Mateja Šumelj	(Age 26)	175 cm		11	(Bosnia and Herzegovina) HRK Grude
35	CB	Sara Bašić Salkić	(Age 26)	178 cm		0	(Bosnia and Herzegovina) ZRK Krivaja
24	LW	Sara Majkić	(Age 22)	173 cm		0	(Bosnia and Herzegovina) ZRK Borac
30	LP	Ajla Alikadić	(Age 26)	163 cm		0	(Bosnia and Herzegovina) ZRK Gorazde
19	LP	Damljana Bošnjak	6 Feb 1998 (Age 25)	183 cm		3	(Bosnia and Herzegovina) ZRK Jedinstvo Tuzla
32	RW	Sara Čahtarević	(Age 25)	172 cm		0	(Bosnia and Herzegovina) RK Hadzici
18	LP	Adna Halebić	(Age 26)	175 cm		0	(Bosnia and Herzegovina) RK Hadzici
4	LB	Jovana Ilić	(Age 22)	175 cm		4	(Bosnia and Herzegovina) HRK Grude
17	CB	Dejana Kulić	(Age 27)	171 cm		0	(Bosnia and Herzegovina) RK Hadzici
41	CB	Adnana Latifović	(Age 23)	175 cm		0	(Bosnia and Herzegovina) ZRK Krivaja
5	LB	Alena Latifović	(Age 18)	186 cm		12	(Bosnia and Herzegovina) ZRK Krivaja
3	LP	Karla Lovrić	(Age 19)	175 cm		17	(Bosnia and Herzegovina) HRK Grude
38	LW	Ajna Mačak	(Age 23)	160 cm		14	(Bosnia and Herzegovina) ZRK Krivaja
33	LP	Jovana Novaković	(Age 23)	172 cm		0	(Bosnia and Herzegovina) ZRK Borac
8	LB	Ana Petrović	( Age 20)	175 cm		0	(Bosnia and Herzegovina) HRK Grude
6	CB	Milana Railić	(Age 18)	169 cm		0	(Bosnia and Herzegovina) ZRK Borac
36	LW	Ivana Rozić	(Age 29)	172 cm		0	(Bosnia and Herzegovina) ZRK Zrinski Mostar
77	RW	Admira Zvekić	(Age 27)	169 cm		25	(Bosnia and Herzegovina) OZRK Jedinstvo Tuzla
1	GK	Anica Gudelj	(Age 32)	182 cm		0	(Romania) CSM Corona Brașov
21	GK	Anisa Selimović	(Age 25)	171 cm		0	(Bosnia and Herzegovina) RK Hadzici
12	GK	Darjana Vukliš	(Age 28)	170 cm		0	(Bosnia and Herzegovina) ZRK Borac

== Results and fixtures ==
The following is a list of match results and future matches that have been scheduled.

Win Draw Loss Fixture

=== 2000 ===
23 May 2000 2000 Women's Challenge Trophy	Bosnia and Herzegovina	31:26	Finland	Antwerp (BEL)
18:45 UTC−4		Report		Referee: Van Dijk, Carla and Wijtenburg, Yvonne

23 May 2000 Women's Challenge Trophy	Bosnia and Herzegovina	28:28	Latvia	Antwerp (BEL)
17:30 UTC−4		Report		Referee: Kostov, Ivan and Kostov, Milen

25 May 2000 Women's Challenge Trophy	Bosnia and Herzegovina	47:13	Cyprus	Antwerp (BEL)
19:15 UTC−4		Report		Referee: Luchini, Renato and Di Pasquale, Salvatore

26 May 2000 Women's Challenge Trophy	Bosnia and Herzegovina	20:16	Belgium	Antwerp (BEL)
17:00		Report		Referee: Sondors, Zigmars and Licis, Renars

27 May 2000 Women's Challenge Trophy	Israel	29:32	Bosnia and Herzegovina	Antwerp (BEL)
14:30		Report		Referee: Fohn, Claudia and Viatour, Nathalie

28 May 2000 Women's Challenge Trophy	Bosnia and Herzegovina	30:26	Belgium	Antwerp (BEL)
12:30		Report		Referee: Van Dijk, Carla and Wijtenburg, Yvonne

=== 2001 ===
25 November 2001 Women's European Championship Qualification	Bosnia and Herzegovina	26:27	Portugal	Visoko (BIH)
15:00		Report		Referee: Fleisch, Holger and Rieber, Jürgen

2 December 2001 Women's European Championship Qualification	Portugal	26:18	Bosnia and Herzegovina	Aljustrel, Slovenia
18:30		Report		Referee: Lajko, Csaba and Seidler, Bernhard

=== 2002 ===
21 November 2002 Women's World Championship Qualification	Italy	22:26	Bosnia and Herzegovina	Ceccano, Italy
20:00		Report		Referee: Fernandez Pineiro, Maria Cristina and Permuy, Pablo

24 November 2002 Women's World Championship	Bosnia and Herzegovina	33:29	Italy	Tuzla, Bosnia
17:00		Report		Referee: Dobler, Beat and Meyer, Marco

29 November 2002 Women's World Championship Qualifications	Bosnia and Herzegovina	29:27	Portugal	Tuzla, Bosnia
15:00		Report		Referee: Bashev, Ivan and Dobrev, Georgi

1 December 2002 Women's World Championship Qualifications	Portugal	24:22	Bosnia and Herzegovina	Leiria, Portugal
15:30		Report		Referee: Evers, Frans and Kums, Marcel

5 December 2002 Women's World Championship Qualifications	Bosnia and Herzegovina	27:25	Lithuania	Tuzla, Bosnia
15:00		Report		Referee: Konecny, Jiri and Ondras, Jiri

7 December 2002 Women's World Championship Qualifications	Lithuania	36:30	Bosnia and Herzegovina	Tuzla, BIH
15:00		Report		Referee: Konecny, Jiri and Ondras, Jiri

=== 2003 ===
24 May 2003 Women's World Championship Play-Off	Bosnia and Herzegovina	22:44	Hungary	Tuzla, Bosnia
17:00		Report		Referee: Methe, Bernd and Methe, Reiner

May 31 2003 Women's World Championship Play-Off	Hungary	44:19	Bosnia and Herzegovina	Nyiregyhaza (HUN)
20:45		Report		Referee: Liachovicius, Valdemaras and Paskevicius, Gintaras

=== 2006 ===
5. April 2006 Women's Challenge Trophy	Bosnia and Herzegovina	51:15	Estonia	Vogosca, BIH
19:00		Report		Referee: Christidi, Ioanna and Papamattheou, Ioanna

9. April 2006 Women's Challenge Trophy	Armenia	13:56	Bosnia and Herzegovina	Vogosca (BIH)
19:00		Report		Referee: Crnojevic, Helena and Kostecki Radic, Emina

April 7. 2006 Women's Challenge Trophy	Bosnia and Herzegovina	36:21	Cyprus	Vogosca (BIH)
19:00		Report		Referee: Crnojevic, Helena and Kostecki Radic, Emina

April 6. 2006 Women's Challenge Trophy	Bosnia and Herzegovina	49:16	Georgia	Vogosca (BIH)
17:00		Report		Referee: Ünlü Hatipoglu, Pinar and Simsek, Mehtap

9. April 2006 Women's Challenge Trophy	Bosnia and Herzegovina	40:24	Faroe Islands	Vogosca (BIH)
19:00		Report		Referee: Crnojevic, Helena and Kostecki Radic, Emina

8. November 2006 Women's World Championship Qualifications	Czech Republic	38:21	Bosnia and Herzegovina	Cheb (CZE)
15:30		Report		Referee: Guseva, Valerija and Vartanyan, Stella

29. November 2006 Women's World Championship Qualifications	Bosnia and Herzegovina	25:29	Bulgaria	Cheb (CZE)
18:00		Report		Referee: Guseva, Valerija and Vartanyan, Stella

1. December 2006 Women's World Championship Qualifications	Bosnia and Herzegovina	29:36	Greece	Cheb (CZE)
20:00		Report		Referee: Ciulei, Diana-Carmen and Stoia, Anamaria

2. December 2006 Women's World Championship Qualifications	Montenegro	31:27	Bosnia and Herzegovina	Cheb (CZE)
20:00		Report		Referee: Ciulei, Diana-Carmen and Stoia, Anamaria

3. December 2006 Women's World Championship Qualifications	Turkey	35:28	Bosnia and Herzegovina	Cheb (CZE)
18:00		Report		Referee: Veber, Ales and Pangerc, Damjan Janez

=== 2007 ===
27. November 2007 Women's European Championship Qualifications	Bosnia and Herzegovina	26:18	Greece	Panevezys (LTU)
15:00		Report		Referee: Guseva, Valerija and Vartanyan, Stella

28. November 2007 Women's European Championship Qualifications	Bosnia and Herzegovina	29:35	Belgium	Panevezys (LTU) - VSI "Rankinio Centras"
14:00		Report		Referee: Ciulei, Diana-Carmen and Stoia, Anamaria

30. November 2007 Women's European Championship Qualifications	Israel	20:28	Bosnia and Herzegovina	Panevezys (LTU) - VSI "Rankinio Centras"
14:00		Report		Referee: Van Dijk, Carla and Wijtenburg, Yvonne

1, December 2007 Women's European Championship Qualifications	Bosnia and Herzegovina	22:27	Iceland	Panevezys (LTU) - VSI "Rankinio Centras"
14:00		Report		Referee: Guseva, Valerija and Vartanyan, Stella

2 December 2007 Women's European Championship Qualifications	Lithuania	34:23	Bosnia and Herzegovina	Panevezys (LTU) - VSI "Rankinio Centras"
15:00		Report		Referee: Guseva, Valerija and Vartanyan, Stella

=== 2008 ===
6. March 2008 Women's Challenge Trophy	Bosnia and Herzegovina	33:22	Israel	Larnaca (CYP) - Kition Sports Center
14:00		Report		Referee: Johnsen, Stine and Röen, Guro

27. March 2008 Women's Challenge Trophy	Malta	6:35	Bosnia and Herzegovina	Larnaca (CYP) - Kition Sports Center
13:00		Report		Referee: Constantinou, Sotiris and Mouttas, Christos

28. March 2008 Women's Challenge Trophy	Bosnia and Herzegovina	31:28	Finland	Larnaca (CYP) - Kition Sports Center
19:00		Report		Referee: Blinova, Marina and Popova, Maria

9. March 2008 Women's Challenge Trophy	Bosnia and Herzegovina	20:21	Faroe Islands	Larnaca (CYP) - Kition Sports Cente
17:00		Report		Referee: Christidi, Ioanna and Papamattheou, Ioanna

30. March 2008 Women's Challenge Trophy	Bosnia and Herzegovina	23:16	Great Britain	Larnaca (CYP) - Kition Sports Center
13:30		Report		Referee: Johnsen, Stine and Röen, Guro

=== 2018 ===
29. May 2018 Women's Challenge Trophy	Azerbaijan	16:34	Bosnia and Herzegovina	Tuzla (BIH) - KSPC Mejdan
18:30		Report		Referee: Murariu, Georgiana and Paraschiv, Mihaela

30. May 2018 Women's Challenge Trophy	Bosnia and Herzegovina	34:20	Great Britain	Tuzla (BIH) - KSPC Mejdan
18:30		Report		Referee: Puksic, Zan and Satler, Miha

31. May 2018 Women's Challenge Trophy	Bosnia and Herzegovina	39:14	Luxembourg	Tuzla (BIH) - KSPC Mejdan
18:30		Report		Referee: Marton, Zsofia and Szabo, Eszter

2. Jun, 2018 Women's Challenge Trophy	Bosnia and Herzegovina	30:24	Estonia	Tuzla (BIH) - KSPC Mejdan
18:30		Report		Referee: Marton, Zsofia and Szabo, Eszter

3. Jun, 2018 Women's Challenge Trophy	Belgium	26:27	Bosnia and Herzegovina	Tuzla (BIH) - KSPC Mejdan
17:00		Report		Referee: Murariu, Georgiana and Paraschiv, Mihaela

=== 2021 ===
4. Jun, 2021 Women's EHF Euro 2022	Greece	29:18	Bosnia and Herzegovina	Veria (GRE) - Filippio Sports Hall
17:00		Report		Referee: Yovchev, Svetoslav and Yonchev, Zvezdelin

5. Jun, 2021 Women's EHF EURO 2022	Bosnia and Herzegovina	25:22	Italy	Veria (GRE) - Filippio Sports Hall
15:00		Report		Referee: Vitaku, Erdoan and Vitaku, Arsim

6. Jun, 2021 Women's EHF EURO 2022	Bosnia and Herzegovina	31:19	Latvia	Veria (GRE) - Filippio Sports Hall
12:00		Report		Referee: Vitaku, Erdoan and Vitaku, Arsim

=== 2022 ===
3. November 2022 Women's World Championship Qualifications	Greece	23:21	Bosnia and Herzegovina	Cazin (BIH) - Sports Hall Cazin
20:00		Report		Referee: Ivanovic, Stefan and Vujisic, Marko

5. November 2022 Women's World Championship 2023 Play Off	Bosnia and Herzegovina	22:21	Greece	Cazin (BIH) - Sports Hall Cazin
17:00		Report		Referee: Ivanovic, Stefan and Vujisic, Marko

=== 2023 ===
11. October 2023 Women's EHF EURO 2024 Qualifications	Romania	49:18	Bosnia and Herzegovina	Oras Mioveni, Judet Arges (ROU) - Sala Sporturilor Mioveni
16:30		Report		Referee: Bocakova, Barbora and Janosikova, Lucia

14. October 2023 Women's EHF EURO 2024 Qualifications	Bosnia and Herzegovina	17:31	Croatia	Cazin (BIH) - Salih Omercevic _Cazin
20:00		Report		Referee: Ilieva, Marija and Karbeska, Silvana

=== 2024 ===
28. February 2024 Women's EHF EURO 2024 Qualifications	Bosnia and Herzegovina	22:24	Greece	Cazin (BIH) - Ju Centar Za Obrazovanje Kulturu I Sport
19:00		Report		Referee: Klompers and Stobbe

3. March 2024 Women's EHF EURO 2024 Qualifications	Greece	27:23	Bosnia and Herzegovina	Kozani (GRE) - Municipal Sports Center Lefkovrisi
16:00		Report		Referee: Peretz and Schwartz

4. April 2024 Women's EHF EURO 2024 Qualifications	Bosnia and Herzegovina	16:37	Romania	Cazin (BIH) - Sports Hall Cazin
20:00		Report		Referee: Me. Ilievski and Mi. Ilievski

7. April 2024 Women's EHF EURO 2024 Qualifications	Croatia	33:19	Bosnia and Herzegovina	Zagreb (SRB) - Športska dvorana Sutinska vrela
18:00		Report		Referee: Charalambous and Efstathiou

26. October 2024 Women's World Championship Qualifications	Kosovo	32:26	Bosnia and Herzegovina	Hasselt (BEL) - Sporthal Alverberg
18:00		Report		Referee: Bočáková and Jánošíková

27. October 2024 Women's World Championship Qualifications	Bosnia and Herzegovina	27:28	Belgium	Hasselt (BEL) - Sporthal Alverberg
16:00		Report		Referee: Bočáková and Jánošíková

=== 2025 ===
7. March 2025 Women's EHF EURO 2026 Qualification phase 1	Estonia	20:31	Bosnia and Herzegovina	Tuzia (BIH) - KSPC Mejdan
17:00		Report		Referee: Pavićević and Martinović

9. March 2025 Women's EHF EURO 2026 Qualification phase 1	Bosnia and Herzegovina	25:15	Great Britain	Tuzia (BIH) - KSPC Mejdan
17:00		Report		Referee: Pavićević and Martinović

16. October 2025 Women's EHF EURO 2026 Qualification phase 2	Switzerland	35:19	Bosnia and Herzegovina	Winterthur (SUI) - AXA Arena
19:15		Report		Referee: Šniurevičius and Grigalionis

18. October 2025 Women's EHF EURO 2026 Qualification phase 2	Bosnia and Herzegovina	19:39	Netherlands	Cazin (BIH) - JU Sportski centar Salih Omerčević
20:00		Report		Referee: Marton and Dáné

=== 2026 ===
4–5. March 2026 Women's EHF EURO 2026 Qualification phase 2	Bosnia and Herzegovina	v	Italy
TBA

7–8. March 2026 Women's EHF EURO 2026 Qualification phase 2	Italy	v	Bosnia and Herzegovina
TBA

7–8. April 2026 Women's EHF EURO 2026 Qualification phase 2	Bosnia and Herzegovina	v	Switzerland
TBA

12. April 2026 Women's EHF EURO 2026 Qualification phase 2	Netherlands	v	Bosnia and Herzegovina
TBA

== Coaches ==
- Radan Rovčanin: 04.03.21- 21.10.22 (596 days)
- Alma Čehajić Hadžović: 21.10.22- 19.09.2023 (333 days)
- Adnan Bašić: 19.09.2023- Current

== Top Results ==
- Challenge Trophy - 2000 Champion
- Challenge Trophy - 2006 Champion
- Challenge Trophy - 2008 3rd place
- Challenge Trophy - 2018 Champion
