= Israel women's national handball team =

The Israel women's national handball team represents Israel in international team handball competitions. It has yet to participate in a World championship. This team began its activity in 1963 and played its first international game only a dozen years later. This year the team has striven to improve their skills and has achieved notable results in tournaments such as the European Championship qualifiers and other regional competitions.

In October 2024 the Israeli girls' team finished the European U17 Championship, Tier B, in fifth place, after a dramatic 40:42 victory, winning a penalty shootout against the Latvian team.

== World Cup 2021 ==
In the qualification for the 2021 Women's Handball World Championship, the team was eliminated in the first round of a tournament in Luxembourg in March 2021 after a win against Luxembourg and defeats against Ukraine and Slovakia . Israelische Frauen-Handballnationalmannschaft

== European Championship 2020 ==
In qualifying for the 2020 European Championship, the team was eliminated in the first round of a tournament in Greece in June 2019 after a win against Luxembourg, a draw against Finland and a loss against Greece .

== European Championship 2022 ==
In the qualification for the 2022 European Championship, the team played in the first round of a tournament in the Faroe Islands in June 2021 against the Faroe Islands (25:29) and Finland (24:28) and thus failed to qualify.
