= Italy women's national handball team =

Italy

Information
- Association: Italian Handball Federation (Federazione Italiana Giuoco Handball)
- Coach: Giuseppe Tedesco
- Assistant coach: Elena Barani

Colours
1st	2nd

Results

World Championship
- Appearances: 1 (First in 2001)
- Best result: 16th (2001)
- Last updated on 25 December 2022.

The Italy women's national handball team (Italian: Nazionale di pallamano femminile dell'Italia) represent Italy in international team handball competitions.

It participated in the 2001 World Women's Handball Championship, which was hosted in Italy, placing 16th. It won the EHF Challenge Trophy in 2004.

== Competitive record ==
=== World Championship ===
Year	Position	GP	W	D	L	GS	GA	GD
1957-1999	Did not enter							
(Italy) 2001	16th	6	2	0	4	120	146	-26
2003-2025	Did not qualify							
(Hungary) 2027	TBD							
(Spain) 2029	TBD							
(Czech Republic) (Poland) 2031	TBD							
Total	1/30	6	2	0	4	120	146	-26

=== Mediterranean Games ===
- 1979 - 3rd
- 1987 - Winner
- 1991 – 4th
- 1993 – 5th
- 1997 – 7th
- 2001 – 6th
- 2005 – 6th
- 2009 – 8th
- 2013 – 8th
- 2018 – 6th
- 2026 – (gold)

== Current squad ==
Squad for the qualification phase to the 2023 World Women's Handball Championship.

No.	Pos.	Name	Date of birth (age)	Height	App.	Goals	Club
99	GK	Nila Bertolino	4 July 2000 (age 26)				(Italy) Cassano Magnago HB
16	GK	Maddalena Cabrini	12 June 2004 (age 22)				(Italy) Dossobuono
95	GK	Sara Margherita Di Giugno	18 June 2002 (age 24)	1.80 m			(Italy) Jomi Salerno
1	GK	Francesca Luchin	5 June 1991 (age 35)	1.84 m			(Italy) SSV Brixen Südtirol
12	GK	Anja Rossignoli	14 December 1999 (age 26)				(Switzerland) Yellow Winterthur
25	W	Giada Babbo	12 September 1997 (age 28)	1.60 m			(Italy) SSV Brixen Südtirol
10	P	Angela Cappellaro	16 February 1995 (age 31)				(Germany) Füchse Berlin
27	B	Eleonora Colloredo	2 October 2001 (age 24)				(Italy) ASD Cassa Rurale Pontinia
32	CB	Giulia Conte	5 October 2003 (age 22)				(Italy) ASD Cassa Rurale Pontinia
87	B	Martina Crosta	28 November 2003 (age 22)	1.70 m			(Italy) ASD Cassa Rurale Pontinia
4	RB	Ilaria Dalla Costa	18 February 1995 (age 31)	1.85 m			(Italy) Jomi Salerno
20	W	Carelle Djiogap Noumedem	6 February 2000 (age 26)				(Italy) Cellini Padova
28	B	Vanessa Djiogap Tenguim	9 July 2001 (age 25)				(Italy) Cellini Padova
8	P	Osarosemwen Bevelyn Eghianruwa	8 September 2002 (age 23)	1.73 m			(Italy) Cellini Padova
17	LB	Serena Osamagbe Eghianruwa	20 November 2004 (age 21)	1.84 m			(Italy) Cellini Padova
11	RB	Giulia Fabbo	26 October 2003 (age 22)	1.74 m			(France) Metz Handball
26	RB	Irène Fanton	3 April 1994 (age 32)				(France) Achenheim Truchtersheim HB
9	B	Sofia Ghilardi	18 June 1999 (age 27)	1.73 m			(France) HAC Le Havre
26	P	Aurora Gislimberti	4 March 2004 (age 22)				(Italy) Mezzocorona
94	LW	Giulia Gozzi	5 July 2002 (age 24)	1.61 m			(Italy) ASD Amatori Conversano
22	RW	Sarah Hilber	10 May 1998 (age 28)	1.72 m			(Italy) SSV Brixen Südtirol
21	B	Charity Osaheniye Iyamu	19 October 2005 (age 20)				(Italy) Tushe Prato
67	LW	Olga Lanfredi	13 April 2001	1.68 m			(Italy) Nuova HF Teramo
92	B	Cyrielle Paola Lauretti Matos	28 November 2000 (age 25)	1.80 m			(Italy) Jomi Salerno
88	RW	Asia Kristal Mangone	28 November 2001 (age 24)				(Italy) Casalgrande Padana
15	LB	Ramona Vesna Manojlovic	15 October 2002 (age 23)	1.72 m			(Italy) Jomi Salerno
2	RW	Giorgia Meneghini	17 March 2005 (age 21)				(Italy) Cellini Padova
91	LB	Anika Niederwieser	28 February 1992 (age 34)	1.85 m			(Germany) Thüringer HC
37	CB	Michela Notarianni	2 November 1996 (age 29)	1.65 m			(Italy) ASD Cassa Rurale Pontinia
90	RW	Luisella Podda	28 November 2000 (age 25)	1.65 m			(Italy) ASD Cassa Rurale Pontinia
89	CB	Lisa Michele Ponti	28 November 1998 (age 27)	1.60 m			(Italy) Cassano Magnago HB
6	B	Rocio Sthefani Squizziato	25 June 1994 (age 32)	1.80 m			(Italy) Jomi Salerno
3	CB	Irene Stefanelli	18 November 1998 (age 27)	1.76 m			(Italy) ASD Pallamano Mestrino
13	P	Lucila Maria Stettler	1 August 1990 (age 36)	1.75 m			(Italy) Jomi Salerno

== See also ==
- Italy women's national beach handball team
- Italy men's national handball team
