= Bulgaria women's national handball team =

Bulgaria

Information
- Association: Bulgarian Handball Federation

Colours
1st	2nd

Results

World Championship
- Appearances: 2 (First in 1982)
- Best result: 10th (1982)
- Last updated on Unknown.

The Bulgaria national women's handball team is the national team of Bulgaria. It takes part in international team handball competitions. The team's greatest result came in 1984 when they won the Balkan Championship along with achieving the 10th rank at the World Cup. The team participated in the 1982 World Women's Handball Championship in Hungary, placing 10th, and in the 1990 World Women's Handball Championship in South Korea, placing 12th.

== World Championship record ==
- 1982 – 10th place
- 1990 – 12th place
