= National team appearances in the European Women's Handball Championship =

This article lists the performances of each of the 26 national teams which have made at least one appearance in the European Women's Handball Championship finals.

== Debut of teams ==
Each successive European Women's Handball Championship has had at least one team appearing for the first time. Teams in parentheses are considered successor teams by IHF.

Year	Debutants in qualification	Number of debutants	Debutants in championship	Number of debutants
1994; Qual.	Austria; Azerbaijan; Belarus; Bulgaria; Croatia; Czech Republic; Denmark; France; Georgia; Hungary; Iceland; Italy; Latvia; Lithuania; Luxembourg; Moldova; Netherlands; Norway; Poland; Portugal; Romania; Russia; Slovakia; Slovenia; Spain; Switzerland; Sweden; Turkey; Ukraine	29	Austria; Croatia; Czech Republic; Denmark; Germany; Hungary; Norway; Romania; Russia; Slovakia; Sweden; Ukraine	12
1996; Qual.	Germany; FR Yugoslavia	2	Lithuania; Poland	2
1998; Qual.	North Macedonia	1	North Macedonia; Netherlands; Spain	3
2000; Qual.	Greece	1	Belarus; France; FR Yugoslavia	3
2002; Qual.	Bosnia and Herzegovina	1	Slovenia	1
2004; Qual.				0
2006; Qual.	Finland (Serbia)	1 (+1)	(Serbia)	(+1)
2008; Qual.	Israel; Montenegro	2	Portugal	1
2010; Qual.	Great Britain	1	Iceland; Montenegro	2
2012; Qual.				0
2014; Qual.				0
2016; Qual.	Faroe Islands; Kosovo	2		0
2018; Qual.				0
2020; Qual.				0
2022; Qual.	Cyprus	1	Switzerland	1
2024; Qual.			Faroe Islands; Turkey	2
2026; Qual.	Belgium; Estonia; Malta	3	Greece	1
2028; Qual.		TBD		TBD
2030; Qual.		TBD	(Belgium)^{1}	(1)
2032; Qual.		TBD		TBD

^{1} Belgium is certain of qualifying of hosts of the 2030 European Women's Handball Championship, but could also still make their debut at the 2028 European Women's Handball Championship.

== Participating nations ==
Legend

- 1st – Champions
- 2nd – Runners-up
- 3rd – Third place
- 4th – Fourth place
- 5th – Fifth place
- 6th – Sixth place
- 7th – Seventh place
- 8th – Eighth place
- 9th – Ninth place
- 10th – Tenth place
- 11th – Eleventh place
- 12th – Twelfth place
- 13th to 16th – Thirteenth to sixteenth place
- Q – Qualified for upcoming tournament
- q – may still qualify for upcoming tournament
- • – Did not qualify
- •× – Disqualified
- × – Did not enter / Withdrew / Banned
- – Hosts

For each tournament, the number of teams in each finals tournament (in brackets) are shown.

Nation	(Germany) 1994	(Denmark) 1996	(Netherlands) 1998	(Romania) 2000	(Denmark) 2002	(Hungary) 2004	(Sweden) 2006	(North Macedonia) 2008	(Denmark) (Norway) 2010	(Serbia) 2012	(Croatia) (Hungary) 2014	(Sweden) 2016	(France) 2018	(Denmark) 2020	(North Macedonia) (Montenegro) (Slovenia) 2022	(Austria) (Hungary) (Switzerland) 2024	(Czech Republic) (Poland) (Romania) (Slovakia) (Turkey) 2026	(Denmark) (Norway) (Sweden) 2028	(Belgium) (France) 2030	(Denmark) (Germany) (Poland) 2032	Participations
Austria	9th	3rd	4th	12th	9th	10th	10th	15th	•	•	•	•	•	•	•	14th	Q				10
Belarus	•	•	•	11th	16th	16th	•	12th	•	•	•	•	•	•	×	×	×				4
Belgium	×	×	×	×	×	×	×	×	×	×	×	×	×	×	×	×	•		Q		1
Croatia	5th	6th	•	•	•	13th	7th	6th	9th	13th	13th	16th	16th	3rd	10th	19th	Q				14
Czech Republic	8th	•	•	•	8th	15th	•	•	•	12th	•	10th	15th	15th	•	15th	Q				9
Denmark	1st	1st	2nd	10th	1st	2nd	11th	11th	4th	5th	8th	4th	8th	4th	2nd	2nd	Q	Q		Q	18
Faroe Islands	×	×	×	×	×	×	×	×	×	×	×	•	•	•	•	17th	Q				2
France	•	•	•	5th	3rd	11th	3rd	14th	5th	9th	5th	3rd	1st	2nd	4th	4th	Q		Q		14
Germany	2nd	4th	6th	9th	11th	5th	4th	4th	13th	7th	10th	6th	10th	7th	7th	7th	Q			Q	17
Greece	•	•	•	•	•	•	•	•	•	•	•	•	•	•	•	•	Q				1
Hungary	4th	10th	3rd	1st	5th	3rd	5th	8th	10th	3rd	6th	12th	7th	10th	11th	3rd	Q				17
Iceland	•	•	•	•	•	•	•	•	15th	15th	•	•	•	•	•	16th	Q				4
Lithuania	•	12th	•	•	•	•	•	•	•	•	•	•	•	•	•	•	•				1
Montenegro^{1}							•	•	6th	1st	4th	13th	9th	8th	3rd	8th	Q				9
Netherlands	•	•	10th	•	14th	•	15th	•	8th	•	7th	2nd	3rd	6th	6th	6th	Q				11
North Macedonia	×	×	8th	8th	•	•	12th	7th	•	16th	•	•	•	•	16th	18th	Q				8
Norway	3rd	2nd	1st	6th	2nd	1st	1st	1st	1st	2nd	1st	1st	5th	1st	1st	1st	Q	Q			18
Poland	•	11th	5th	•	•	•	8th	•	•	•	11th	15th	14th	14th	13th	9th	Q			Q	10
Portugal	•	•	•	•	•	•	•	16th	•	•	•	•	•	•	•	22nd	•				2
Romania	10th	5th	11th	4th	7th	7th	•	5th	3rd	10th	9th	5th	4th	12th	12th	11th	Q				16
Russia	6th	7th	9th	3rd	4th	4th	2nd	3rd	7th	6th	14th	7th	2nd	5th	×	×	×				14
Serbia^{1}							14th	13th	14th	4th	15th	9th	11th	13th	15th	21st	Q				11
Slovakia	12th	•	•	•	•	•	•	•	•	•	12th	•	•	•	•	24th	Q				4
Slovenia	•	•	•	•	10th	9th	16th	•	16th	•	•	14th	13th	16th	8th	10th	Q				10
Spain	•	•	12th	•	13th	8th	9th	2nd	11th	11th	2nd	11th	12th	9th	9th	13th	Q				14
Sweden	7th	8th	•	•	15th	14th	6th	9th	2nd	8th	3rd	8th	6th	11th	5th	5th	Q	Q			16
Switzerland	•	•	•	•	•	•	•	•	•	•	•	•	•	•	14th	12th	Q				3
Turkey	•	•	•	•	•	•	•	•	•	•	•	•	•	•	•	20th	Q				2
Ukraine	11th	9th	7th	2nd	12th	6th	13th	10th	12th	14th	16th	•	•	•	•	23rd	Q				13
Historical national teams
Serbia and Montenegro^{1}						12th															1
FR Yugoslavia^{1}	×	•	•	7th	6th																2
Total	12	12	12	12	16	16	16	16	16	16	16	16	16	16	16	24	24	24	24	24	

^{1} FR Yugoslavia competed as such until 2003 when the FRY was reconstituted as a State Union Serbia and Montenegro. Since the dissolution of the union in 2006, national teams exist for both countries.

== Results of host nations ==
Year	Host nation	Finish
1994	Germany	Runners-up
1996	Denmark	Champions
1998	Netherlands	Tenth place
2000	Romania	Fourth place
2002	Denmark	Champions
2004	Hungary	Third place
2006	Sweden	Sixth place
2008	North Macedonia	Seventh place
2010	Denmark	Fourth place
2010	Norway	Champions
2012	Serbia	Fourth place
2014	Croatia	Thirteenth place
2014	Hungary	Sixth place
2016	Sweden	Eighth place
2018	France	Champions
2020	Denmark	Fourth place
2022	Montenegro	Third place
2022	North Macedonia	Sixteenth place
2022	Slovenia	Eighth place
2024	Austria	Fourteenth place
2024	Hungary	Third place
2024	Switzerland	Twelfth place
2026	Czech Republic	
2026	Poland	
2026	Romania	
2026	Slovakia	
2026	Turkey	
2028	Denmark	
2028	Norway	
2028	Sweden	
2030	Belgium	
2030	France	
2032	Denmark	
2032	Germany	
2032	Poland	

== Results of defending champions ==
Year	Defending champions	Finish
1996	Denmark	Champions
1998	Denmark	Runners-up
2000	Norway	Sixth place
2002	Hungary	Fifth place
2004	Denmark	Runners-up
2006	Norway	Champions
2008	Norway	Champions
2010	Norway	Champions
2012	Norway	Runners-up
2014	Montenegro	Fourth place
2016	Norway	Champions
2018	Norway	Fifth place
2020	France	Runners-up
2022	Norway	Champions
2024	Norway	Champions
2026	Norway	
