= 2026 European Women's Handball Championship qualification =

Qualifying process for 2026 handball championship

2026 EHF European Women's Handball Championship qualification
Tournament details
- Dates: 7 March 2025 – 12 April 2026
- Teams: 30

Tournament statistics
- Matches played: 81

The 2026 European Women's Handball Championship qualification was a handball competition that was played from March 2025 to April 2026 to determine the 16 EHF member women's national teams that would join the automatically qualified teams in the final tournament. Alongside the qualifiers, the EHF Euro Cup also took place.

A total of 30 EHF member associations entered the qualifying process alongside the eight teams in the EHF Euro Cup. The draw for the qualifying group stage took place in Cluj-Napoca on 20 March 2025.

== Qualification system ==
The qualification consisted of two phases:

- Phase 1

Nine bottom-ranked teams were drawn into three groups of three. The groups were played in a single-round-robin system, with the group winners advancing to phase 2 and joining the remaining teams.

- Phase 2

Three phase 1 winners and 21 top-ranked teams were drawn into six groups of four. The groups were played in a double-round-robin system. The top two teams from each group and the best four third-placed teams qualified for the final tournament.

== Qualification phase 1 ==
The groups were played at a single venue.

=== Draw ===
The draw took place on 20 December 2024.

==== Seeding ====
Pot 1	Pot 2	Pot 3
Bosnia and Herzegovina; Lithuania; Luxembourg	Bulgaria; Cyprus; Great Britain	Belgium; Estonia; Malta

=== Groups ===
==== Group 1 ====
Pos	Team	Pld	W	D	L	GF	GA	GD	Pts	Qualification
1	Bosnia and Herzegovina (H)	2	2	0	0	56	35	+21	4	Qualification phase 2
2	Estonia	2	1	0	1	55	56	−1	2	
3	Great Britain	2	0	0	2	40	60	−20	0	

Source: EHF
Rules for classification: 1) points; 2) head-to-head points; 3) head-to-head goal difference; 4) head-to-head number of goals scored; 5) goal difference.
(H) Hosts

7 March 2025; 17:00	Estonia	20–31	Bosnia and Herzegovina	KSPC Mejdan, Tuzla; Attendance: 400; Referees: Pavićević, Martinović (MNE)
7 March 2025; 17:00	Gorbatsjova 5	(8–14)	Bošnjak 7	KSPC Mejdan, Tuzla; Attendance: 400; Referees: Pavićević, Martinović (MNE)
7 March 2025; 17:00	1× (yellow card) 4× (suspension)	Report	2× (suspension)	KSPC Mejdan, Tuzla; Attendance: 400; Referees: Pavićević, Martinović (MNE)

8 March 2025; 17:00	Great Britain	25–35	Estonia	KSPC Mejdan, Tuzla; Attendance: 100; Referees: Pavićević, Martinović (MNE)
8 March 2025; 17:00	Luke 9	(14–19)	Molkova 11	KSPC Mejdan, Tuzla; Attendance: 100; Referees: Pavićević, Martinović (MNE)
8 March 2025; 17:00	1× (yellow card) 1× (suspension)	Report	5× (suspension)	KSPC Mejdan, Tuzla; Attendance: 100; Referees: Pavićević, Martinović (MNE)

9 March 2025; 17:00	Bosnia and Herzegovina	25–15	Great Britain	KSPC Mejdan, Tuzla; Attendance: 450; Referees: Pavićević, Martinović (MNE)
9 March 2025; 17:00	Topčić 7	(12–9)	Kesselring 4	KSPC Mejdan, Tuzla; Attendance: 450; Referees: Pavićević, Martinović (MNE)
9 March 2025; 17:00	3× (suspension)	Report	1× (yellow card) 4× (suspension)	KSPC Mejdan, Tuzla; Attendance: 450; Referees: Pavićević, Martinović (MNE)

==== Group 2 ====
Pos	Team	Pld	W	D	L	GF	GA	GD	Pts	Qualification
1	Lithuania	2	2	0	0	66	31	+35	4	Qualification phase 2
2	Bulgaria (H)	2	1	0	1	60	41	+19	2	
3	Malta	2	0	0	2	22	76	−54	0	

Source: EHF
Rules for classification: 1) points; 2) head-to-head points; 3) head-to-head goal difference; 4) head-to-head number of goals scored; 5) goal difference.
(H) Hosts

7 March 2025; 17:30	Bulgaria	37–14	Malta	Palace of Culture and Sports, Varna; Attendance: 750; Referees: Bočáková, Jánošíková (SVK)
7 March 2025; 17:30	Spasova 10	(19–9)	Schiavone 5	Palace of Culture and Sports, Varna; Attendance: 750; Referees: Bočáková, Jánošíková (SVK)
7 March 2025; 17:30	1× (yellow card) 6× (suspension)	Report	2× (suspension)	Palace of Culture and Sports, Varna; Attendance: 750; Referees: Bočáková, Jánošíková (SVK)

8 March 2025; 15:00	Malta	8–39	Lithuania	Palace of Culture and Sports, Varna; Attendance: 150; Referees: Bočáková, Jánošíková (SVK)
8 March 2025; 15:00	Petrella 3	(3–17)	Andronik 7	Palace of Culture and Sports, Varna; Attendance: 150; Referees: Bočáková, Jánošíková (SVK)
8 March 2025; 15:00	3× (suspension)	Report	1× (yellow card) 3× (suspension)	Palace of Culture and Sports, Varna; Attendance: 150; Referees: Bočáková, Jánošíková (SVK)

9 March 2025; 13:00	Lithuania	27–23	Bulgaria	Palace of Culture and Sports, Varna; Attendance: 1,000; Referees: Bočáková, Jánošíková (SVK)
9 March 2025; 13:00	Pilikauskaitė 8	(16–11)	Panayotova 6	Palace of Culture and Sports, Varna; Attendance: 1,000; Referees: Bočáková, Jánošíková (SVK)
9 March 2025; 13:00	4× (suspension)	Report	1× (yellow card) 4× (suspension)	Palace of Culture and Sports, Varna; Attendance: 1,000; Referees: Bočáková, Jánošíková (SVK)

==== Group 3 ====
Pos	Team	Pld	W	D	L	GF	GA	GD	Pts	Qualification
1	Belgium	2	2	0	0	54	41	+13	4	Qualification phase 2
2	Cyprus (H)	2	1	0	1	44	42	+2	2	
3	Luxembourg	2	0	0	2	44	59	−15	0	

Source: EHF
Rules for classification: 1) points; 2) head-to-head points; 3) head-to-head goal difference; 4) head-to-head number of goals scored; 5) goal difference.
(H) Hosts

7 March 2025; 18:00	Cyprus	18–21	Belgium	Eleftheria Indoor Hall, Nicosia; Attendance: 800; Referees: Peretz, Schwartz (ISR)
7 March 2025; 18:00	Papa 8	(12–12)	N. Antonissen 6	Eleftheria Indoor Hall, Nicosia; Attendance: 800; Referees: Peretz, Schwartz (ISR)
7 March 2025; 18:00	1× (suspension)	Report	1× (yellow card) 3× (suspension)	Eleftheria Indoor Hall, Nicosia; Attendance: 800; Referees: Peretz, Schwartz (ISR)

8 March 2025; 18:00	Belgium	33–23	Luxembourg	Eleftheria Indoor Hall, Nicosia; Attendance: 300; Referees: Peretz, Schwartz (ISR)
8 March 2025; 18:00	N. Antonissen 8	(17–10)	Dautaj 6	Eleftheria Indoor Hall, Nicosia; Attendance: 300; Referees: Peretz, Schwartz (ISR)
8 March 2025; 18:00	2× (yellow card) 3× (suspension) 1× (red card)	Report	5× (suspension)	Eleftheria Indoor Hall, Nicosia; Attendance: 300; Referees: Peretz, Schwartz (ISR)

9 March 2025; 18:00	Luxembourg	21–26	Cyprus	Eleftheria Indoor Hall, Nicosia; Attendance: 550; Referees: Peretz, Schwartz (ISR)
9 March 2025; 18:00	Cilovic 6	(8–17)	Konstantinidou 10	Eleftheria Indoor Hall, Nicosia; Attendance: 550; Referees: Peretz, Schwartz (ISR)
9 March 2025; 18:00	1× (yellow card) 3× (suspension)	Report	2× (yellow card) 1× (suspension) 1× (red card)	Eleftheria Indoor Hall, Nicosia; Attendance: 550; Referees: Peretz, Schwartz (ISR)

== Qualification phase 2 ==
Each team played three matches at home and three matches away.

=== Draw ===
The draw took place on 20 March 2025.

==== Seeding ====
The seeding was announced on 11 March 2025.

Pot 1	Pot 2	Pot 3	Pot 4
France; Sweden; Netherlands; Germany; Montenegro; Spain	Slovenia; Croatia; Austria; Switzerland; Serbia; Iceland	North Macedonia; Ukraine; Portugal; Italy; Greece; Kosovo	Faroe Islands; Finland; Israel; Bosnia and Herzegovina; Lithuania; Belgium

=== Groups ===
All times are CET/CEST.

==== Group 1 ====
Pos	Team	Pld	W	D	L	GF	GA	GD	Pts	Qualification
1	France	6	6	0	0	222	93	+129	12	Final tournament
2	Croatia	6	4	0	2	159	134	+25	8	Final tournament
3	Finland	6	2	0	4	118	176	−58	4	
4	Kosovo	6	0	0	6	112	208	−96	0	

Source: EHF
Rules for classification: 1) points; 2) head-to-head points; 3) head-to-head goal difference; 4) head-to-head number of goals scored; 5) goal difference.

15 October 2025; 17:00	Croatia	25–17	Finland	Sportska dvorana Zeleni brijeg, Sisak; Attendance: 1,100; Referees: Sekulić, Jovandić (SRB)
15 October 2025; 17:00	Milosavljević 5	(11–8)	Aarnio 9	Sportska dvorana Zeleni brijeg, Sisak; Attendance: 1,100; Referees: Sekulić, Jovandić (SRB)
15 October 2025; 17:00	1× (yellow card) 4× (suspension)	Report	1× (yellow card) 6× (suspension)	Sportska dvorana Zeleni brijeg, Sisak; Attendance: 1,100; Referees: Sekulić, Jovandić (SRB)

15 October 2025; 20:45	France	43–12	Kosovo	Le Parnasse, Nîmes; Attendance: 2,210; Referees: Hummelgård, Svensson (SWE)
15 October 2025; 20:45	Toublanc 8	(20–5)	M. Qorraj 6	Le Parnasse, Nîmes; Attendance: 2,210; Referees: Hummelgård, Svensson (SWE)
15 October 2025; 20:45	4× (suspension)	Report	2× (suspension)	Le Parnasse, Nîmes; Attendance: 2,210; Referees: Hummelgård, Svensson (SWE)

19 October 2025; 15:00	Finland	15–32	France	Energia Areena, Vantaa; Attendance: 1,650; Referees: Dasic, Husomanovic (NOR)
19 October 2025; 15:00	Aarnio 7	(7–14)	three players 4	Energia Areena, Vantaa; Attendance: 1,650; Referees: Dasic, Husomanovic (NOR)
19 October 2025; 15:00	1× (yellow card) 2× (suspension)	Report	1× (yellow card) 1× (suspension)	Energia Areena, Vantaa; Attendance: 1,650; Referees: Dasic, Husomanovic (NOR)

19 October 2025; 17:15	Kosovo	22–32	Croatia	Palace of Youth and Sports, Pristina; Attendance: 950; Referees: Ilieva, Karbeska (MKD)
19 October 2025; 17:15	M. Qorraj 6	(13–14)	Barišić 12	Palace of Youth and Sports, Pristina; Attendance: 950; Referees: Ilieva, Karbeska (MKD)
19 October 2025; 17:15	1× (yellow card) 4× (suspension)	Report	1× (yellow card) 6× (suspension)	Palace of Youth and Sports, Pristina; Attendance: 950; Referees: Ilieva, Karbeska (MKD)

5 March 2026; 17:00	Croatia	19–30	France	Dvorana europskih prvaka, Bjelovar; Attendance: 1,200; Referees: Marton, Dáné (HUN)
5 March 2026; 17:00	Milosavljević 8	(7–19)	Bouktit 7	Dvorana europskih prvaka, Bjelovar; Attendance: 1,200; Referees: Marton, Dáné (HUN)
5 March 2026; 17:00	6× (suspension)	Report	1× (suspension)	Dvorana europskih prvaka, Bjelovar; Attendance: 1,200; Referees: Marton, Dáné (HUN)

5 March 2026; 17:30	Finland	23–21	Kosovo	Energia Areena, Vantaa; Attendance: 1,347; Referees: Härgin, Makejev (EST)
5 March 2026; 17:30	Aarnio 8	(14–10)	M. Qorraj 10	Energia Areena, Vantaa; Attendance: 1,347; Referees: Härgin, Makejev (EST)
5 March 2026; 17:30	1× (yellow card) 5× (suspension)	Report	2× (yellow card) 5× (suspension)	Energia Areena, Vantaa; Attendance: 1,347; Referees: Härgin, Makejev (EST)

8 March 2026; 16:30	France	34–14	Croatia	Arènes de Metz, Metz; Attendance: 4,634; Referees: Hellbusch, Jansen (GER)
8 March 2026; 16:30	Grandveau, Granier 6	(19–9)	four players 2	Arènes de Metz, Metz; Attendance: 4,634; Referees: Hellbusch, Jansen (GER)
8 March 2026; 16:30	2× (suspension)	Report	1× (yellow card) 2× (suspension)	Arènes de Metz, Metz; Attendance: 4,634; Referees: Hellbusch, Jansen (GER)

8 March 2026; 17:15	Kosovo	27–29	Finland	Palace of Youth and Sports, Pristina; Attendance: 250; Referees: Riello, Panetta (ITA)
8 March 2026; 17:15	Gjikokaj 9	(15–12)	Voutilainen 7	Palace of Youth and Sports, Pristina; Attendance: 250; Referees: Riello, Panetta (ITA)
8 March 2026; 17:15	2× (suspension)	Report	5× (suspension)	Palace of Youth and Sports, Pristina; Attendance: 250; Referees: Riello, Panetta (ITA)

9 April 2026; 17:30	Finland	18–32	Croatia	Energia Areena, Vantaa; Attendance: 1,250; Referees: Duplii, Karpushchenko (UKR)
9 April 2026; 17:30	Voutilainen 5	(9–16)	Milosavljević 6	Energia Areena, Vantaa; Attendance: 1,250; Referees: Duplii, Karpushchenko (UKR)
9 April 2026; 17:30	4× (suspension) 1× (red card)	Report	6× (suspension)	Energia Areena, Vantaa; Attendance: 1,250; Referees: Duplii, Karpushchenko (UKR)

9 April 2026; 20:15	Kosovo	17–44	France	Palace of Youth and Sports, Pristina; Attendance: 790; Referees: Lukoševičius, Virkutis (LTU)
9 April 2026; 20:15	Kastrati 6	(10–21)	Jacques 6	Palace of Youth and Sports, Pristina; Attendance: 790; Referees: Lukoševičius, Virkutis (LTU)
9 April 2026; 20:15	1× (yellow card) 2× (suspension)	Report	1× (yellow card) 4× (suspension)	Palace of Youth and Sports, Pristina; Attendance: 790; Referees: Lukoševičius, Virkutis (LTU)

12 April 2026; 18:00	France	39–16	Finland	Futuroscope, Chasseneuil-du-Poitou; Attendance: 4,078; Referees: Xavier, Bragança (POR)
12 April 2026; 18:00	three players 6	(20–8)	Voutilainen 5	Futuroscope, Chasseneuil-du-Poitou; Attendance: 4,078; Referees: Xavier, Bragança (POR)
12 April 2026; 18:00	3× (suspension)	Report	2× (suspension)	Futuroscope, Chasseneuil-du-Poitou; Attendance: 4,078; Referees: Xavier, Bragança (POR)

12 April 2026; 18:00	Croatia	37–13	Kosovo	High School Jelkovec, Zagreb; Attendance: 850; Referees: Pavićević, Martinović (MNE)
12 April 2026; 18:00	Birtić 6	(18–10)	Kastrati, Matarova 4	High School Jelkovec, Zagreb; Attendance: 850; Referees: Pavićević, Martinović (MNE)
12 April 2026; 18:00	2× (suspension)	Report	5× (suspension)	High School Jelkovec, Zagreb; Attendance: 850; Referees: Pavićević, Martinović (MNE)

==== Group 2 ====
Pos	Team	Pld	W	D	L	GF	GA	GD	Pts	Qualification
1	Netherlands	6	6	0	0	227	113	+114	12	Final tournament
2	Switzerland	6	4	0	2	185	140	+45	8	Final tournament
3	Italy	6	1	0	5	144	200	−56	2 (Note: Italy 61–48 Bosnia and Herzegovina)	
4	Bosnia and Herzegovina	6	1	0	5	111	214	−103	2	

Source: EHF
Rules for classification: 1) points; 2) head-to-head points; 3) head-to-head goal difference; 4) head-to-head number of goals scored; 5) goal difference.
Notes:

16 October 2025; 19:15	Switzerland	35–19	Bosnia and Herzegovina	AXA Arena, Winterthur; Attendance: 1,420; Referees: Šniurevičius, Grigalionis (LTU)
16 October 2025; 19:15	Schmid 8	(19–11)	Demić, Kolašinac 6	AXA Arena, Winterthur; Attendance: 1,420; Referees: Šniurevičius, Grigalionis (LTU)
16 October 2025; 19:15	1× (yellow card) 5× (suspension)	Report	2× (suspension)	AXA Arena, Winterthur; Attendance: 1,420; Referees: Šniurevičius, Grigalionis (LTU)

16 October 2025; 19:30	Netherlands	42–19	Italy	Maaspoort, 's-Hertogenbosch; Attendance: 2,138; Referees: Pétursson, Þrastarson (ISL)
16 October 2025; 19:30	Vollebregt 9	(22–9)	Djiogap Tenguim, Fanton 3	Maaspoort, 's-Hertogenbosch; Attendance: 2,138; Referees: Pétursson, Þrastarson (ISL)
16 October 2025; 19:30	1× (yellow card) 5× (suspension)	Report	2× (suspension)	Maaspoort, 's-Hertogenbosch; Attendance: 2,138; Referees: Pétursson, Þrastarson (ISL)

18 October 2025; 20:00	Bosnia and Herzegovina	19–39	Netherlands	JU Sportski centar Salih Omerčević, Cazin; Attendance: 450; Referees: Marton, Dáné (HUN)
18 October 2025; 20:00	Kolašinac 11	(11–20)	Van der Vliet 6	JU Sportski centar Salih Omerčević, Cazin; Attendance: 450; Referees: Marton, Dáné (HUN)
18 October 2025; 20:00	5× (suspension) 2× (red card)	Report	6× (suspension)	JU Sportski centar Salih Omerčević, Cazin; Attendance: 450; Referees: Marton, Dáné (HUN)

19 October 2025; 18:00	Italy	25–37	Switzerland	Pala Santa Filomena, Chieti; Attendance: 1,200; Referees: Rauchs, Linster (LUX)
19 October 2025; 18:00	Manojlovic 6	(13–18)	Baumann, Schmid 7	Pala Santa Filomena, Chieti; Attendance: 1,200; Referees: Rauchs, Linster (LUX)
19 October 2025; 18:00	3× (suspension)	Report	3× (suspension)	Pala Santa Filomena, Chieti; Attendance: 1,200; Referees: Rauchs, Linster (LUX)

5 March 2026; 19:15	Switzerland	21–39	Netherlands	Pilatus Arena, Kriens; Attendance: 2,465; Referees: Ilieva, Karbeska (MKD)
5 March 2026; 19:15	Gautschi 5	(10–18)	three players 5	Pilatus Arena, Kriens; Attendance: 2,465; Referees: Ilieva, Karbeska (MKD)
5 March 2026; 19:15	1× (yellow card) 3× (suspension)	Report	1× (yellow card) 3× (suspension)	Pilatus Arena, Kriens; Attendance: 2,465; Referees: Ilieva, Karbeska (MKD)

5 March 2026; 20:00	Bosnia and Herzegovina	28–25	Italy	JU Sportski centar Salih Omerčević, Cazin; Attendance: 800; Referees: Yovchev, Yonchev (BUL)
5 March 2026; 20:00	Lovrić 8	(14–12)	Manojlovic 7	JU Sportski centar Salih Omerčević, Cazin; Attendance: 800; Referees: Yovchev, Yonchev (BUL)
5 March 2026; 20:00	1× (yellow card) 5× (suspension)	Report	4× (suspension)	JU Sportski centar Salih Omerčević, Cazin; Attendance: 800; Referees: Yovchev, Yonchev (BUL)

8 March 2026; 15:00	Netherlands	25–22	Switzerland	Topsportcentrum, Almere; Attendance: 2,000; Referees: Duplii, Pobedrina (UKR)
8 March 2026; 15:00	Housheer 7	(13–12)	Buchner, Emmenegger 5	Topsportcentrum, Almere; Attendance: 2,000; Referees: Duplii, Pobedrina (UKR)
8 March 2026; 15:00	3× (suspension)	Report	4× (suspension)	Topsportcentrum, Almere; Attendance: 2,000; Referees: Duplii, Pobedrina (UKR)

8 March 2026; 18:00	Italy	36–20	Bosnia and Herzegovina	Palasport Giovanni Paolo II, Pescara; Attendance: 900; Referees: Charalambous, Efstathiou (CYP)
8 March 2026; 18:00	Manojlovic 11	(15–8)	Dautović, Lovrić 5	Palasport Giovanni Paolo II, Pescara; Attendance: 900; Referees: Charalambous, Efstathiou (CYP)
8 March 2026; 18:00	4× (suspension)	Report	5× (suspension)	Palasport Giovanni Paolo II, Pescara; Attendance: 900; Referees: Charalambous, Efstathiou (CYP)

9 April 2026; 18:00	Italy	20–35	Netherlands	Palazzetto dello Sport Giuliano, Giugliano in Campania; Attendance: 250; Referees: Petrović, Zrnić (SRB)
9 April 2026; 18:00	Dalla Costa 5	(8–17)	Van der Vliet 8	Palazzetto dello Sport Giuliano, Giugliano in Campania; Attendance: 250; Referees: Petrović, Zrnić (SRB)
9 April 2026; 18:00		Report	4× (suspension)	Palazzetto dello Sport Giuliano, Giugliano in Campania; Attendance: 250; Referees: Petrović, Zrnić (SRB)

9 April 2026; 20:00	Bosnia and Herzegovina	13–32	Switzerland	Sportski Centar Salih Omercevic, Cazin; Attendance: 800; Referees: Geraets, Geraets (NED)
9 April 2026; 20:00	Lovrić 5	(7–21)	Buchner 8	Sportski Centar Salih Omercevic, Cazin; Attendance: 800; Referees: Geraets, Geraets (NED)
9 April 2026; 20:00	1× (suspension)	Report	1× (yellow card) 5× (suspension)	Sportski Centar Salih Omercevic, Cazin; Attendance: 800; Referees: Geraets, Geraets (NED)

12 April 2026; 18:00	Netherlands	47–12	Bosnia and Herzegovina	Topsportcentrum, Almere; Attendance: 1,800; Referees: Weber, Weinquin (LUX)
12 April 2026; 18:00	Dekker 9	(25–7)	Bajrić 6	Topsportcentrum, Almere; Attendance: 1,800; Referees: Weber, Weinquin (LUX)
12 April 2026; 18:00	1× (yellow card) 2× (suspension)	Report	3× (suspension)	Topsportcentrum, Almere; Attendance: 1,800; Referees: Weber, Weinquin (LUX)

12 April 2026; 18:00	Switzerland	38–19	Italy	Saalsporthalle, Zürich; Attendance: 2,400; Referees: Radčenko, Pērsis (LAT)
12 April 2026; 18:00	Emmenegger 7	(14–11)	Dalla Costa, Manojlovic 5	Saalsporthalle, Zürich; Attendance: 2,400; Referees: Radčenko, Pērsis (LAT)
12 April 2026; 18:00	4× (suspension)	Report	2× (suspension)	Saalsporthalle, Zürich; Attendance: 2,400; Referees: Radčenko, Pērsis (LAT)

==== Group 3 ====
Pos	Team	Pld	W	D	L	GF	GA	GD	Pts	Qualification
1	Germany	6	6	0	0	217	132	+85	12	Final tournament
2	Slovenia	6	4	0	2	161	137	+24	8	Final tournament
3	North Macedonia	6	1	0	5	141	178	−37	2 (Note: North Macedonia 58–54 Belgium)	Final tournament
4	Belgium	6	1	0	5	136	208	−72	2	

Source: EHF
Rules for classification: 1) points; 2) head-to-head points; 3) head-to-head goal difference; 4) head-to-head number of goals scored; 5) goal difference.
Notes:

15 October 2025; 18:00	Slovenia	29–22	Belgium	Arena Bonifika, Koper; Attendance: 1,000; Referees: Mikelić, Parađina (CRO)
15 October 2025; 18:00	Fegic 7	(17–8)	N. Antonissen 13	Arena Bonifika, Koper; Attendance: 1,000; Referees: Mikelić, Parađina (CRO)
15 October 2025; 18:00	1× (yellow card) 2× (suspension)	Report		Arena Bonifika, Koper; Attendance: 1,000; Referees: Mikelić, Parađina (CRO)

16 October 2025; 19:30	Germany	34–18	North Macedonia	Schwalbe Arena, Gummersbach; Attendance: 2,500; Referees: Nygaard, Primdahl (DEN)
16 October 2025; 19:30	Hauf, Leuchter 5	(14–8)	Rizoska 8	Schwalbe Arena, Gummersbach; Attendance: 2,500; Referees: Nygaard, Primdahl (DEN)
16 October 2025; 19:30	2× (yellow card) 2× (suspension)	Report	1× (yellow card) 6× (suspension)	Schwalbe Arena, Gummersbach; Attendance: 2,500; Referees: Nygaard, Primdahl (DEN)

19 October 2025; 13:45	Belgium	21–40	Germany	Sporthal Alverberg, Hasselt; Attendance: 1,548; Referees: L. Hardegger, S. Hardegger (SUI)
19 October 2025; 13:45	N. Antonissen 11	(7–19)	Döll 7	Sporthal Alverberg, Hasselt; Attendance: 1,548; Referees: L. Hardegger, S. Hardegger (SUI)
19 October 2025; 13:45	4× (suspension)	Report	4× (suspension)	Sporthal Alverberg, Hasselt; Attendance: 1,548; Referees: L. Hardegger, S. Hardegger (SUI)

19 October 2025; 18:00	North Macedonia	20–28	Slovenia	Boro Čurlevski Sports Hall, Bitola; Attendance: 2,200; Referees: Vujačić, Kažanegra (MNE)
19 October 2025; 18:00	Arsenievska 4	(11–12)	Fegic 6	Boro Čurlevski Sports Hall, Bitola; Attendance: 2,200; Referees: Vujačić, Kažanegra (MNE)
19 October 2025; 18:00	1× (yellow card) 4× (suspension)	Report	3× (suspension)	Boro Čurlevski Sports Hall, Bitola; Attendance: 2,200; Referees: Vujačić, Kažanegra (MNE)

4 March 2026; 18:00	Slovenia	23–30	Germany	Golovec Hall, Celje; Attendance: 1,800; Referees: Manea, Iliescu (ROU)
4 March 2026; 18:00	Stanko 7	(15–16)	Döll 7	Golovec Hall, Celje; Attendance: 1,800; Referees: Manea, Iliescu (ROU)
4 March 2026; 18:00	3× (suspension)	Report	1× (yellow card) 6× (suspension)	Golovec Hall, Celje; Attendance: 1,800; Referees: Manea, Iliescu (ROU)

4 March 2026; 20:10	Belgium	26–25	North Macedonia	Sporthal Alverberg, Hasselt; Attendance: 1,025; Referees: Hummelgård, Svensson (SWE)
4 March 2026; 20:10	Smits 11	(14–15)	Kiprijanovska 7	Sporthal Alverberg, Hasselt; Attendance: 1,025; Referees: Hummelgård, Svensson (SWE)
4 March 2026; 20:10	1× (yellow card) 4× (suspension)	Report	1× (yellow card) 3× (suspension)	Sporthal Alverberg, Hasselt; Attendance: 1,025; Referees: Hummelgård, Svensson (SWE)

7 March 2026; 17:00	North Macedonia	33–28	Belgium	Sports Hall Kumanovo, Kumanovo; Attendance: 400; Referees: Petrović, Zrnić (SRB)
7 March 2026; 17:00	Jankulovska 8	(17–14)	N. Antonissen 13	Sports Hall Kumanovo, Kumanovo; Attendance: 400; Referees: Petrović, Zrnić (SRB)
7 March 2026; 17:00	1× (yellow card) 6× (suspension)	Report	2× (yellow card) 2× (suspension)	Sports Hall Kumanovo, Kumanovo; Attendance: 400; Referees: Petrović, Zrnić (SRB)

8 March 2026; 15:30	Germany	33–18	Slovenia	SNP Dome, Heidelberg; Attendance: 3,791; Referees: Rauchs, Linster (LUX)
8 March 2026; 15:30	Döll, Engel 5	(18–8)	Bajc 6	SNP Dome, Heidelberg; Attendance: 3,791; Referees: Rauchs, Linster (LUX)
8 March 2026; 15:30	1× (yellow card) 2× (suspension)	Report	1× (suspension)	SNP Dome, Heidelberg; Attendance: 3,791; Referees: Rauchs, Linster (LUX)

8 April 2026; 18:00	North Macedonia	27–35	Germany	Boris Trajkovski Sports Center, Skopje; Attendance: 850; Referees: Stancu (ROU), Pepe ( ITA)
8 April 2026; 18:00	Kiprijanovska 6	(14–19)	Engel 9	Boris Trajkovski Sports Center, Skopje; Attendance: 850; Referees: Stancu (ROU), Pepe ( ITA)
8 April 2026; 18:00	5× (suspension)	Report	1× (yellow card) 3× (suspension)	Boris Trajkovski Sports Center, Skopje; Attendance: 850; Referees: Stancu (ROU), Pepe ( ITA)

8 April 2026; 20:10	Belgium	14–36	Slovenia	Sporthal Alverberg, Hasselt; Attendance: 850; Referees: Heddid, Picot (FRA)
8 April 2026; 20:10	N. Antonissen 9	(6–20)	Stanko 10	Sporthal Alverberg, Hasselt; Attendance: 850; Referees: Heddid, Picot (FRA)
8 April 2026; 20:10	1× (yellow card) 5× (suspension)	Report	1× (yellow card) 1× (suspension)	Sporthal Alverberg, Hasselt; Attendance: 850; Referees: Heddid, Picot (FRA)

12 April 2026; 18:00	Germany	45–25	Belgium	Westpress Arena, Hamm; Attendance: 2,311; Referees: Martin-Eckersall, Silva (GBR)
12 April 2026; 18:00	Döll 7	(22–14)	N. Antonissen 6	Westpress Arena, Hamm; Attendance: 2,311; Referees: Martin-Eckersall, Silva (GBR)
12 April 2026; 18:00		Report	1× (yellow card) 2× (suspension)	Westpress Arena, Hamm; Attendance: 2,311; Referees: Martin-Eckersall, Silva (GBR)

12 April 2026; 18:00	Slovenia	27–18	North Macedonia	Rdeča Dvorana, Velenje; Attendance: 600; Referees: Praštalo, Balvan (BIH)
12 April 2026; 18:00	Stanko 5	(15–8)	Jankulovska 4	Rdeča Dvorana, Velenje; Attendance: 600; Referees: Praštalo, Balvan (BIH)
12 April 2026; 18:00	2× (suspension)	Report	1× (suspension)	Rdeča Dvorana, Velenje; Attendance: 600; Referees: Praštalo, Balvan (BIH)

==== Group 4 ====
Pos	Team	Pld	W	D	L	GF	GA	GD	Pts	Qualification
1	Montenegro	6	5	0	1	186	152	+34	10	Final tournament
2	Faroe Islands	6	3	0	3	159	161	−2	6	Final tournament
3	Iceland	6	2	0	4	161	169	−8	4 (Note: Iceland 57–50 Portugal)	Final tournament
4	Portugal	6	2	0	4	144	168	−24	4	

Source: EHF
Rules for classification: 1) points; 2) head-to-head points; 3) head-to-head goal difference; 4) head-to-head number of goals scored; 5) goal difference.
Notes:

15 October 2025; 18:00	Montenegro	29–22	Portugal	Bemax Arena, Podgorica; Attendance: 1,200; Referees: Yovchev, Yonchev (BUL)
15 October 2025; 18:00	Jauković 8	(17–11)	Figueiredo 6	Bemax Arena, Podgorica; Attendance: 1,200; Referees: Yovchev, Yonchev (BUL)
15 October 2025; 18:00	2× (suspension)	Report	1× (yellow card) 2× (suspension)	Bemax Arena, Podgorica; Attendance: 1,200; Referees: Yovchev, Yonchev (BUL)

15 October 2025; 21:30	Iceland	22–24	Faroe Islands	Ithrottamidstod Hauka Asvellir, Hafnarfjörður; Attendance: 950; Referees: Fremstad, Jørstad (NOR)
15 October 2025; 21:30	three players 4	(11–11)	Mittún 7	Ithrottamidstod Hauka Asvellir, Hafnarfjörður; Attendance: 950; Referees: Fremstad, Jørstad (NOR)
15 October 2025; 21:30	2× (suspension)	Report	5× (suspension)	Ithrottamidstod Hauka Asvellir, Hafnarfjörður; Attendance: 950; Referees: Fremstad, Jørstad (NOR)

18 October 2025; 20:00	Faroe Islands	26–32	Montenegro	Við Tjarnir, Tórshavn; Attendance: 2,500; Referees: Janz, Sug (GER)
18 October 2025; 20:00	Mittún 6	(14–14)	Brnović 9	Við Tjarnir, Tórshavn; Attendance: 2,500; Referees: Janz, Sug (GER)
18 October 2025; 20:00	1× (suspension)	Report	3× (suspension)	Við Tjarnir, Tórshavn; Attendance: 2,500; Referees: Janz, Sug (GER)

19 October 2025; 18:00	Portugal	26–25	Iceland	Centro de Desportos e Congressos de Matosinhos, Senhora da Hora; Attendance: 1,147; Referees: Altmár, Horváth (HUN)
19 October 2025; 18:00	Resende 6	(14–13)	Þorkelsdóttir 7	Centro de Desportos e Congressos de Matosinhos, Senhora da Hora; Attendance: 1,147; Referees: Altmár, Horváth (HUN)
19 October 2025; 18:00	4× (suspension) 1× (red card)	Report	5× (suspension)	Centro de Desportos e Congressos de Matosinhos, Senhora da Hora; Attendance: 1,147; Referees: Altmár, Horváth (HUN)

4 March 2026; 19:00	Iceland	28–27	Montenegro	Ithrottamidstod Hauka Asvellir, Hafnarfjörður; Attendance: 846; Referees: Fabryczny, Rawicki (POL)
4 March 2026; 19:00	Þorkelsdóttir 12	(13–13)	Jauković 12	Ithrottamidstod Hauka Asvellir, Hafnarfjörður; Attendance: 846; Referees: Fabryczny, Rawicki (POL)
4 March 2026; 19:00	2× (suspension)	Report	5× (suspension)	Ithrottamidstod Hauka Asvellir, Hafnarfjörður; Attendance: 846; Referees: Fabryczny, Rawicki (POL)

4 March 2026; 20:00	Faroe Islands	25–21	Portugal	Við Tjarnir, Tórshavn; Attendance: 2,450; Referees: Klompers, Stobbe (NED)
4 March 2026; 20:00	Poulsen, Weyhe 5	(12–9)	Ramos 5	Við Tjarnir, Tórshavn; Attendance: 2,450; Referees: Klompers, Stobbe (NED)
4 March 2026; 20:00	2× (suspension)	Report	2× (yellow card) 6× (suspension)	Við Tjarnir, Tórshavn; Attendance: 2,450; Referees: Klompers, Stobbe (NED)

8 March 2026; 18:00	Montenegro	33–24	Iceland	Bemax Arena, Podgorica; Attendance: 1,150; Referees: Murariu, Chiruță (ROU)
8 March 2026; 18:00	Jauković 12	(13–13)	Þorkelsdóttir 7	Bemax Arena, Podgorica; Attendance: 1,150; Referees: Murariu, Chiruță (ROU)
8 March 2026; 18:00	1× (suspension)	Report	1× (yellow card) 2× (suspension)	Bemax Arena, Podgorica; Attendance: 1,150; Referees: Murariu, Chiruță (ROU)

8 March 2026; 18:00	Portugal	25–23	Faroe Islands	Centro de Desportos e Congressos de Matosinhos, Senhora da Hora; Attendance: 1,100; Referees: Lidacka, Lesiak (POL)
8 March 2026; 18:00	Figueiredo 6	(15–8)	Brandenborg, Pálsdóttir 5	Centro de Desportos e Congressos de Matosinhos, Senhora da Hora; Attendance: 1,100; Referees: Lidacka, Lesiak (POL)
8 March 2026; 18:00	5× (suspension) 1× (red card)	Report	1× (yellow card) 2× (suspension)	Centro de Desportos e Congressos de Matosinhos, Senhora da Hora; Attendance: 1,100; Referees: Lidacka, Lesiak (POL)

8 April 2026; 20:00	Faroe Islands	35–30	Iceland	Við Tjarnir, Tórshavn; Attendance: 2,570; Referees: Picard, Vauchez (FRA)
8 April 2026; 20:00	Brandenborg 12	(18–16)	Erlingsdóttir 7	Við Tjarnir, Tórshavn; Attendance: 2,570; Referees: Picard, Vauchez (FRA)
8 April 2026; 20:00	4× (suspension)	Report	1× (yellow card) 2× (suspension)	Við Tjarnir, Tórshavn; Attendance: 2,570; Referees: Picard, Vauchez (FRA)

9 April 2026; 20:00	Portugal	26–34	Montenegro	Centro de Desportos e Congressos de Matosinhos, Senhora da Hora; Attendance: 1,000; Referees: Fukala, Mohyla (CZE)
9 April 2026; 20:00	Figueiredo 7	(13–17)	Jauković, Pletikosić 7	Centro de Desportos e Congressos de Matosinhos, Senhora da Hora; Attendance: 1,000; Referees: Fukala, Mohyla (CZE)
9 April 2026; 20:00	2× (yellow card) 5× (suspension) 1× (red card)	Report	1× (yellow card) 3× (suspension)	Centro de Desportos e Congressos de Matosinhos, Senhora da Hora; Attendance: 1,000; Referees: Fukala, Mohyla (CZE)

12 April 2026; 18:00	Montenegro	31–26	Faroe Islands	Bemax Arena, Podgorica; Attendance: 1,000; Referees: Di Domenico, Fornasier (ITA)
12 April 2026; 18:00	Jauković, Mugoša 6	(22–14)	Poulsen 6	Bemax Arena, Podgorica; Attendance: 1,000; Referees: Di Domenico, Fornasier (ITA)
12 April 2026; 18:00	1× (yellow card) 5× (suspension)	Report	1× (yellow card) 3× (suspension)	Bemax Arena, Podgorica; Attendance: 1,000; Referees: Di Domenico, Fornasier (ITA)

12 April 2026; 18:00	Iceland	32–24	Portugal	Ithrottamidstod Hauka Asvellir, Hafnarfjörður; Attendance: 1,480; Referees: Brodić, Hodžić (CRO)
12 April 2026; 18:00	Þorkelsdóttir 7	(15–12)	Rebelo 7	Ithrottamidstod Hauka Asvellir, Hafnarfjörður; Attendance: 1,480; Referees: Brodić, Hodžić (CRO)
12 April 2026; 18:00	1× (suspension)	Report	4× (suspension) 1× (red card)	Ithrottamidstod Hauka Asvellir, Hafnarfjörður; Attendance: 1,480; Referees: Brodić, Hodžić (CRO)

==== Group 5 ====
Pos	Team	Pld	W	D	L	GF	GA	GD	Pts	Qualification
1	Sweden	6	6	0	0	203	134	+69	12	Final tournament
2	Serbia	6	4	0	2	190	167	+23	8	Final tournament
3	Ukraine	6	2	0	4	148	185	−37	4	Final tournament
4	Lithuania	6	0	0	6	159	214	−55	0	

Source: EHF
Rules for classification: 1) points; 2) head-to-head points; 3) head-to-head goal difference; 4) head-to-head number of goals scored; 5) goal difference.

16 October 2025; 18:00	Serbia	42–33	Lithuania	Sportski Centar "Voždovac", Belgrade; Attendance: 1,750; Referees: E. Aghakishi, E. Aghakishi (AZE)
16 October 2025; 18:00	Krpež Šlezak 11	(24–17)	Arciševskaja 9	Sportski Centar "Voždovac", Belgrade; Attendance: 1,750; Referees: E. Aghakishi, E. Aghakishi (AZE)
16 October 2025; 18:00	1× (yellow card) 6× (suspension)	Report	1× (yellow card) 3× (suspension)	Sportski Centar "Voždovac", Belgrade; Attendance: 1,750; Referees: E. Aghakishi, E. Aghakishi (AZE)

16 October 2025; 18:10	Sweden	33–25	Ukraine	Estrad Alingsås, Alingsås; Attendance: 2,750; Referees: Carmaux, Mursch (FRA)
16 October 2025; 18:10	three players 5	(16–11)	Rosokha, Shukal 5	Estrad Alingsås, Alingsås; Attendance: 2,750; Referees: Carmaux, Mursch (FRA)
16 October 2025; 18:10	1× (yellow card) 5× (suspension)	Report	1× (yellow card) 3× (suspension)	Estrad Alingsås, Alingsås; Attendance: 2,750; Referees: Carmaux, Mursch (FRA)

19 October 2025; 15:00	Lithuania	20–41	Sweden	Šiauliai Sporto salė, Šiauliai; Attendance: 368; Referees: Radčenko, Pērsis (LAT)
19 October 2025; 15:00	Pilikauskaitė 6	(7–21)	Lerby 8	Šiauliai Sporto salė, Šiauliai; Attendance: 368; Referees: Radčenko, Pērsis (LAT)
19 October 2025; 15:00	1× (yellow card) 5× (suspension)	Report	7× (suspension)	Šiauliai Sporto salė, Šiauliai; Attendance: 368; Referees: Radčenko, Pērsis (LAT)

19 October 2025; 18:00	Ukraine	23–34	Serbia	City Sport Hall, Michalovce, Slovakia (Note: Due to the Russian invasion of Ukraine, the Ukrainian team plays their home matches at neutral venues.); Attendance: 250; Referees: Budzák, Záhradník (SVK)
19 October 2025; 18:00	Dmytryshyn, Kolodiuk 4	(12–17)	Garović 7	City Sport Hall, Michalovce, Slovakia; Attendance: 250; Referees: Budzák, Záhradník (SVK)
19 October 2025; 18:00	7× (suspension)	Report	9× (suspension)	City Sport Hall, Michalovce, Slovakia; Attendance: 250; Referees: Budzák, Záhradník (SVK)

4 March 2026; 18:00	Serbia	26–29	Sweden	Sport Centar Mladost "Jezero", Kragujevac; Attendance: 3,150; Referees: Sirbu, Serdiuc (MDA)
4 March 2026; 18:00	Krpež Šlezak 12	(13–13)	Hagman 7	Sport Centar Mladost "Jezero", Kragujevac; Attendance: 3,150; Referees: Sirbu, Serdiuc (MDA)
4 March 2026; 18:00	3× (suspension)	Report	6× (suspension) 1× (red card)	Sport Centar Mladost "Jezero", Kragujevac; Attendance: 3,150; Referees: Sirbu, Serdiuc (MDA)

5 March 2026; 15:00	Ukraine	30–29	Lithuania	Chemkostav Aréna, Michalovce, Slovakia; Attendance: 152; Referees: Bošnjak, Marić (BIH)
5 March 2026; 15:00	Orzhakhovska 6	(15–16)	Andronik, Pilikauskaitė 6	Chemkostav Aréna, Michalovce, Slovakia; Attendance: 152; Referees: Bošnjak, Marić (BIH)
5 March 2026; 15:00	9× (suspension)	Report	1× (yellow card) 6× (suspension)	Chemkostav Aréna, Michalovce, Slovakia; Attendance: 152; Referees: Bošnjak, Marić (BIH)

7 March 2026; 18:10	Sweden	27–22	Serbia	Sparbanken Skåne Arena, Lund; Attendance: 2,696; Referees: Simone, Monitillo (ITA)
7 March 2026; 18:10	Lerby 7	(19–11)	Skrobić, Stamenić 5	Sparbanken Skåne Arena, Lund; Attendance: 2,696; Referees: Simone, Monitillo (ITA)
7 March 2026; 18:10	5× (suspension)	Report	1× (yellow card) 3× (suspension)	Sparbanken Skåne Arena, Lund; Attendance: 2,696; Referees: Simone, Monitillo (ITA)

8 March 2026; 14:10	Lithuania	25–26	Ukraine	Prienai Arena, Prienai; Attendance: 450; Referees: Fukala, Mohyla (CZE)
8 March 2026; 14:10	Pilikauskaitė 7	(10–16)	Kolodiuk, Smbatian 5	Prienai Arena, Prienai; Attendance: 450; Referees: Fukala, Mohyla (CZE)
8 March 2026; 14:10	2× (yellow card) 4× (suspension)	Report	1× (yellow card) 7× (suspension)	Prienai Arena, Prienai; Attendance: 450; Referees: Fukala, Mohyla (CZE)

8 April 2026; 14:00	Ukraine	23–34	Sweden	Mestská športová hala, Šaľa, Slovakia; Attendance: 56; Referees: Murariu, Chiruță (ROU)
8 April 2026; 14:00	Rosokha 6	(9–16)	Axnér 8	Mestská športová hala, Šaľa, Slovakia; Attendance: 56; Referees: Murariu, Chiruță (ROU)
8 April 2026; 14:00	1× (yellow card) 6× (suspension)	Report	3× (suspension)	Mestská športová hala, Šaľa, Slovakia; Attendance: 56; Referees: Murariu, Chiruță (ROU)

9 April 2026; 18:40	Lithuania	34–36	Serbia	Švyturys Arena, Klaipėda; Attendance: 400; Referees: Manea, Iliescu (ROU)
9 April 2026; 18:40	Pilikauskaitė 11	(18–20)	Janjušević 10	Švyturys Arena, Klaipėda; Attendance: 400; Referees: Manea, Iliescu (ROU)
9 April 2026; 18:40	1× (yellow card) 4× (suspension)	Report	1× (yellow card) 7× (suspension)	Švyturys Arena, Klaipėda; Attendance: 400; Referees: Manea, Iliescu (ROU)

12 April 2026; 18:00	Sweden	39–18	Lithuania	Craft Arena, Kosta; Attendance: 1,836; Referees: Oganezov, Raidmets (EST)
12 April 2026; 18:00	Hagman, Lerby 6	(20–9)	Arciševskaja 5	Craft Arena, Kosta; Attendance: 1,836; Referees: Oganezov, Raidmets (EST)
12 April 2026; 18:00	2× (suspension)	Report	3× (suspension)	Craft Arena, Kosta; Attendance: 1,836; Referees: Oganezov, Raidmets (EST)

12 April 2026; 18:00	Serbia	30–21	Ukraine	Sportksa hala Slana Bara, Novi Sad; Attendance: 746; Referees: Altmár, Horváth (HUN)
12 April 2026; 18:00	Janjušević, Krpež Šlezak 6	(14–8)	Smbatian 5	Sportksa hala Slana Bara, Novi Sad; Attendance: 746; Referees: Altmár, Horváth (HUN)
12 April 2026; 18:00	1× (suspension)	Report	2× (yellow card) 4× (suspension)	Sportksa hala Slana Bara, Novi Sad; Attendance: 746; Referees: Altmár, Horváth (HUN)

==== Group 6 ====
Pos	Team	Pld	W	D	L	GF	GA	GD	Pts	Qualification
1	Spain	6	6	0	0	191	120	+71	12	Final tournament
2	Austria	6	4	0	2	192	154	+38	8	Final tournament
3	Greece	6	2	0	4	142	178	−36	4	Final tournament
4	Israel	6	0	0	6	140	213	−73	0	

Source: EHF
Rules for classification: 1) points; 2) head-to-head points; 3) head-to-head goal difference; 4) head-to-head number of goals scored; 5) goal difference.

15 October 2025; 18:00	Austria	39–30	Israel	BSFZ Südstadt, Maria Enzersdorf; Attendance: 526; Referees: Bočáková, Jánošíková (SVK)
15 October 2025; 18:00	Egger 7	(18–12)	Shaul 7	BSFZ Südstadt, Maria Enzersdorf; Attendance: 526; Referees: Bočáková, Jánošíková (SVK)
15 October 2025; 18:00	4× (suspension)	Report		BSFZ Südstadt, Maria Enzersdorf; Attendance: 526; Referees: Bočáková, Jánošíková (SVK)

16 October 2025; 20:30	Spain	35–15	Greece	Port de Sagunt, Valencia, Puerto de Sagunto; Attendance: 1,800; Referees: Cournil, Lamour (FRA)
16 October 2025; 20:30	Arroyo 5	(15–6)	Giannopoulou 4	Port de Sagunt, Valencia, Puerto de Sagunto; Attendance: 1,800; Referees: Cournil, Lamour (FRA)
16 October 2025; 20:30	1× (suspension)	Report	1× (yellow card) 3× (suspension)	Port de Sagunt, Valencia, Puerto de Sagunto; Attendance: 1,800; Referees: Cournil, Lamour (FRA)

19 October 2025; 17:00	Israel	22–38	Spain	Gopass Arena, Bratislava, Slovakia (Note: Due to the Gaza war, the Israeli team plays their home matches at neutral venues.); Attendance: 35; Referees: Brodić, Hodžić (CRO)
19 October 2025; 17:00	Vakrat 7	(7–18)	Vegué 7	Gopass Arena, Bratislava, Slovakia; Attendance: 35; Referees: Brodić, Hodžić (CRO)
19 October 2025; 17:00	1× (yellow card)	Report	1× (yellow card) 1× (suspension)	Gopass Arena, Bratislava, Slovakia; Attendance: 35; Referees: Brodić, Hodžić (CRO)

19 October 2025; 17:00	Greece	22–29	Austria	Municipal Sports Center Lefkovrisi, Kozani; Attendance: 800; Referees: Manea, Illescu (ROU)
19 October 2025; 17:00	Andritsou 9	(9–15)	K. Pandza 7	Municipal Sports Center Lefkovrisi, Kozani; Attendance: 800; Referees: Manea, Illescu (ROU)
19 October 2025; 17:00	1× (yellow card) 3× (suspension)	Report	1× (yellow card) 7× (suspension)	Municipal Sports Center Lefkovrisi, Kozani; Attendance: 800; Referees: Manea, Illescu (ROU)

4 March 2026; 18:00	Austria	24–29	Spain	Sport Arena Wien, Vienna; Attendance: 2,100; Referees: Metalari, Nikolovski (MKD)
4 March 2026; 18:00	Ivančok-Šoltić 7	(12–10)	So Delgado 7	Sport Arena Wien, Vienna; Attendance: 2,100; Referees: Metalari, Nikolovski (MKD)
4 March 2026; 18:00	1× (yellow card) 3× (suspension) 1× (red card)	Report	1× (yellow card) 6× (suspension) 1× (red card)	Sport Arena Wien, Vienna; Attendance: 2,100; Referees: Metalari, Nikolovski (MKD)

7 March 2026; 19:30	Spain	34–24	Austria	Pabellón Ciudad de Algeciras, Algeciras; Attendance: 2,580; Referees: Nygaard, Primdahl (DEN)
7 March 2026; 19:30	So Delgado 7	(15–12)	Ivančok-Šoltić 6	Pabellón Ciudad de Algeciras, Algeciras; Attendance: 2,580; Referees: Nygaard, Primdahl (DEN)
7 March 2026; 19:30	2× (yellow card) 4× (suspension)	Report	2× (yellow card) 2× (suspension)	Pabellón Ciudad de Algeciras, Algeciras; Attendance: 2,580; Referees: Nygaard, Primdahl (DEN)

3 April 2026 (Note: The game, originally scheduled for 4 March 2026, was postponed due to the 2026 Iran war.); 16:00	Israel	24–32	Greece	Municipal Sports Center Lefkovrisi, Kozani, Greece; Attendance: 50; Referees: Jakovljević, Kovačević (SRB)
3 April 2026; 16:00	Vakrat 9	(12–14)	Andrtisou 13	Municipal Sports Center Lefkovrisi, Kozani, Greece; Attendance: 50; Referees: Jakovljević, Kovačević (SRB)
3 April 2026; 16:00	6× (suspension)	Report	2× (suspension)	Municipal Sports Center Lefkovrisi, Kozani, Greece; Attendance: 50; Referees: Jakovljević, Kovačević (SRB)

5 April 2026 (Note: The game, originally scheduled for 8 March 2026, was postponed due to the 2026 Iran war.); 16:00	Greece	35–28	Israel	Municipal Sports Center Lefkovrisi, Kozani; Attendance: 170; Referees: Jakovljević, Kovačević (SRB)
5 April 2026; 16:00	Gkatziou 11	(16–12)	Izak 6	Municipal Sports Center Lefkovrisi, Kozani; Attendance: 170; Referees: Jakovljević, Kovačević (SRB)
5 April 2026; 16:00	1× (yellow card) 3× (suspension)	Report	1× (yellow card) 2× (suspension)	Municipal Sports Center Lefkovrisi, Kozani; Attendance: 170; Referees: Jakovljević, Kovačević (SRB)

8 April 2026; 14:45	Greece	22–24	Spain	Municipal Sports Center Lefkovrisi, Kozani; Attendance: 270; Referees: Carrino, Pellegrino (ITA)
8 April 2026; 14:45	Samolada 10	(12–12)	So Delgado 9	Municipal Sports Center Lefkovrisi, Kozani; Attendance: 270; Referees: Carrino, Pellegrino (ITA)
8 April 2026; 14:45	1× (yellow card) 4× (suspension)	Report	7× (suspension)	Municipal Sports Center Lefkovrisi, Kozani; Attendance: 270; Referees: Carrino, Pellegrino (ITA)

8 April 2026; 18:00	Israel	23–38	Austria	Municipal Sports Center Lefkovrisi, Kozani, Greece; Attendance: 22; Referees: Pukšič, Satler (SLO)
8 April 2026; 18:00	Vakrat 9	(9–17)	Stankovic 5	Municipal Sports Center Lefkovrisi, Kozani, Greece; Attendance: 22; Referees: Pukšič, Satler (SLO)
8 April 2026; 18:00	4× (suspension)	Report	2× (suspension)	Municipal Sports Center Lefkovrisi, Kozani, Greece; Attendance: 22; Referees: Pukšič, Satler (SLO)

12 April 2026; 18:00	Spain	31–13	Israel	Pabellón Macarena Aguilar, Bolaños de Calatrava; Attendance: 25; Referees: Loshak, Shnyt (UKR)
12 April 2026; 18:00	So Delgado 8	(14–8)	Shaul 3	Pabellón Macarena Aguilar, Bolaños de Calatrava; Attendance: 25; Referees: Loshak, Shnyt (UKR)
12 April 2026; 18:00	1× (yellow card) 7× (suspension)	Report	7× (suspension)	Pabellón Macarena Aguilar, Bolaños de Calatrava; Attendance: 25; Referees: Loshak, Shnyt (UKR)

12 April 2026; 18:00	Austria	38–16	Greece	SMS Kleinmünchen, Linz; Attendance: 800; Referees: Rauchs, Linster (LUX)
12 April 2026; 18:00	Egger 8	(22–6)	three players 3	SMS Kleinmünchen, Linz; Attendance: 800; Referees: Rauchs, Linster (LUX)
12 April 2026; 18:00	4× (suspension)	Report	1× (yellow card) 2× (suspension)	SMS Kleinmünchen, Linz; Attendance: 800; Referees: Rauchs, Linster (LUX)

==== Ranking of third-placed teams ====
The results against the fourth-placed teams are omitted.

Pos	Grp	Team	Pld	W	D	L	GF	GA	GD	Pts	Qualification
1	4	Iceland	4	1	0	3	104	119	−15	2	Final tournament
2	5	Ukraine	4	0	0	4	92	131	−39	0	Final tournament
3	3	North Macedonia	4	0	0	4	83	124	−41	0	Final tournament
4	6	Greece	4	0	0	4	75	126	−51	0	Final tournament
5	1	Finland	4	0	0	4	66	128	−62	0	
6	2	Italy	4	0	0	4	83	152	−69	0	

Source: EHF
Rules for classification: 1) points; 2) goal difference; 3) number of goals scored; 4) draw.

== EHF Euro Cup ==
2026 EHF Euro Cup
Tournament details
- Venue: 1 (in 1 host city)
- Dates: 15 October 2025 – 27 September 2026
- Teams: 8 (from 1 confederation)

Final positions
- Champions: Denmark (1st title)
- Runners-up: Norway
- Third place: Romania
- Fourth place: Hungary

The EHF Euro Cup took place for the third time and was played by the 2026 co-hosts and the three best-placed teams of the 2024 European Championship. This was the first time the eight teams participated in the tournament, up from four from the previous two editions.

=== Composition of teams ===
Team	Qualification method	Date of qualification	Appearance(s)				Previous best performance
Team	Qualification method	Date of qualification	Total	First	Last	Streak	Previous best performance
Czech Republic	Co-hosts	8 March 2024	1st	Debut			
Poland	Co-hosts	8 March 2024	1st	Debut			
Romania	Co-hosts	8 March 2024	1st	Debut			
Slovakia	Co-hosts	8 March 2024	1st	Debut			
Turkey	Co-hosts	8 March 2024	1st	Debut			
Denmark	Top three at 2024 edition	13 December 2024	1st	Debut			
Norway	Top three at 2024 edition	13 December 2024	3rd	2022	2024	3	Champions (2022, 2024)
Hungary	Top three at 2024 edition	15 December 2024	2nd	2024		2	Runners-up (2024)

=== Preliminary round ===
==== Group 1 ====
Pos	Team	Pld	W	D	L	GF	GA	GD	Pts	Qualification
1	Norway	6	6	0	0	206	130	+76	12	Semifinals
2	Romania	6	4	0	2	188	182	+6	8	Semifinals
3	Poland	6	2	0	4	165	176	−11	4	
4	Slovakia	6	0	0	6	124	195	−71	0	

Source: EHF
Rules for classification: 1) points; 2) head-to-head points; 3) head-to-head goal difference; 4) head-to-head number of goals scored; 5) goal difference.

15 October 2025; 18:15	Norway	29–27	Romania	Jotron Arena Larvik, Larvik; Attendance: 3,184; Referees: Weijmans, Wolbertus (NED)
15 October 2025; 18:15	Reistad 10	(16–11)	Grozav 7	Jotron Arena Larvik, Larvik; Attendance: 3,184; Referees: Weijmans, Wolbertus (NED)
15 October 2025; 18:15	1× (yellow card) 2× (suspension)	Report	1× (suspension)	Jotron Arena Larvik, Larvik; Attendance: 3,184; Referees: Weijmans, Wolbertus (NED)

16 October 2025; 18:00	Poland	28–20	Slovakia	Hala widowiskowo-sportowa MOSiR w Mielcu, Mielec; Attendance: 1,534; Referees: Duplii, Pobedrina (UKR)
16 October 2025; 18:00	Balsam 10	(15–8)	Lancz 5	Hala widowiskowo-sportowa MOSiR w Mielcu, Mielec; Attendance: 1,534; Referees: Duplii, Pobedrina (UKR)
16 October 2025; 18:00	5× (suspension)	Report	4× (suspension)	Hala widowiskowo-sportowa MOSiR w Mielcu, Mielec; Attendance: 1,534; Referees: Duplii, Pobedrina (UKR)

19 October 2025; 14:00	Slovakia	19–31	Norway	Gopass Arena, Bratislava; Attendance: 3,202; Referees: Jakovljević, Kovačević (SRB)
19 October 2025; 14:00	Lancz 8	(9–18)	Henriksen, Hovden 6	Gopass Arena, Bratislava; Attendance: 3,202; Referees: Jakovljević, Kovačević (SRB)
19 October 2025; 14:00	4× (suspension)	Report	3× (suspension)	Gopass Arena, Bratislava; Attendance: 3,202; Referees: Jakovljević, Kovačević (SRB)

19 October 2025; 18:00	Romania	34–29	Poland	Polyvalent Hall, Craiova; Attendance: 3,230; Referees: Fotakidis, Kinatzidis (GRE)
19 October 2025; 18:00	Grozav 8	(15–15)	Cygan 7	Polyvalent Hall, Craiova; Attendance: 3,230; Referees: Fotakidis, Kinatzidis (GRE)
19 October 2025; 18:00	3× (suspension)	Report	4× (suspension)	Polyvalent Hall, Craiova; Attendance: 3,230; Referees: Fotakidis, Kinatzidis (GRE)

5 March 2026; 18:00	Poland	24–31	Norway	Hala widowiskowo-sportowa RCS w Lubinie, Lubin; Attendance: 3,249; Referees: Maia, Nunes (POR)
5 March 2026; 18:00	Kobylińska, Rosiak 4	(11–18)	Reistad 9	Hala widowiskowo-sportowa RCS w Lubinie, Lubin; Attendance: 3,249; Referees: Maia, Nunes (POR)
5 March 2026; 18:00	5× (suspension)	Report	1× (yellow card) 1× (suspension)	Hala widowiskowo-sportowa RCS w Lubinie, Lubin; Attendance: 3,249; Referees: Maia, Nunes (POR)

5 March 2026; 18:00	Slovakia	26–32	Romania	Chemkostav Aréna, Michalovce; Attendance: 902; Referees: Cournil, Lamour (FRA)
5 March 2026; 18:00	Lancz 5	(9–18)	Grozav 10	Chemkostav Aréna, Michalovce; Attendance: 902; Referees: Cournil, Lamour (FRA)
5 March 2026; 18:00	1× (yellow card) 3× (suspension)	Report	3× (suspension)	Chemkostav Aréna, Michalovce; Attendance: 902; Referees: Cournil, Lamour (FRA)

7 March 2026; 18:15	Norway	32–16	Poland	Steinkjerhallen, Steinkjer; Attendance: 3,207; Referees: Fält, Holm (SWE)
7 March 2026; 18:15	Reistad 6	(17–8)	Uścinowicz 4	Steinkjerhallen, Steinkjer; Attendance: 3,207; Referees: Fält, Holm (SWE)
7 March 2026; 18:15	2× (suspension)	Report	3× (suspension)	Steinkjerhallen, Steinkjer; Attendance: 3,207; Referees: Fält, Holm (SWE)

8 March 2026; 18:00	Romania	32–19	Slovakia	TeraPlast Arena, Bistrița; Attendance: 2,700; Referees: Pavićević, Martinović (MNE)
8 March 2026; 18:00	Grozav 7	(16–8)	three players 3	TeraPlast Arena, Bistrița; Attendance: 2,700; Referees: Pavićević, Martinović (MNE)
8 March 2026; 18:00	1× (yellow card) 2× (suspension)	Report	1× (suspension)	TeraPlast Arena, Bistrița; Attendance: 2,700; Referees: Pavićević, Martinović (MNE)

8 April 2026; 18:00	Romania	25–45	Norway	Polyvalent Hall - Ioan Kunst Ghermanescu, Bucharest; Attendance: 4,300; Referees: Simone, Monitillo (ITA)
8 April 2026; 18:00	Seraficeanu 5	(9–24)	Henriksen 6	Polyvalent Hall - Ioan Kunst Ghermanescu, Bucharest; Attendance: 4,300; Referees: Simone, Monitillo (ITA)
8 April 2026; 18:00		Report	1× (yellow card) 3× (suspension)	Polyvalent Hall - Ioan Kunst Ghermanescu, Bucharest; Attendance: 4,300; Referees: Simone, Monitillo (ITA)

8 April 2026; 18:00	Slovakia	21–34	Poland	Mestská Sportova hala Sala, Šaľa; Attendance: 1,169; Referees: Dašić, Husomanović (NOR)
8 April 2026; 18:00	Pócsíková 4	(10–13)	Balsam 11	Mestská Sportova hala Sala, Šaľa; Attendance: 1,169; Referees: Dašić, Husomanović (NOR)
8 April 2026; 18:00	1× (yellow card) 6× (suspension)	Report	2× (yellow card) 3× (suspension)	Mestská Sportova hala Sala, Šaľa; Attendance: 1,169; Referees: Dašić, Husomanović (NOR)

12 April 2026; 18:00	Poland	34–38	Romania	Radomskie Centrum Sportu, Radom; Attendance: 2,946; Referees: Oyarzun, Zaragüeta (ESP)
12 April 2026; 18:00	Rosiak 8	(15–21)	Roșu 7	Radomskie Centrum Sportu, Radom; Attendance: 2,946; Referees: Oyarzun, Zaragüeta (ESP)
12 April 2026; 18:00	1× (suspension)	Report	7× (suspension)	Radomskie Centrum Sportu, Radom; Attendance: 2,946; Referees: Oyarzun, Zaragüeta (ESP)

12 April 2026; 18:00	Norway	38–19	Slovakia	Aquarama, Kristiansand; Attendance: 2,000; Referees: Harðarson, Magnússon (ISL)
12 April 2026; 18:00	Wollik 10	(20–5)	Šcípová 4	Aquarama, Kristiansand; Attendance: 2,000; Referees: Harðarson, Magnússon (ISL)
12 April 2026; 18:00	1× (yellow card) 3× (suspension)	Report	2× (suspension)	Aquarama, Kristiansand; Attendance: 2,000; Referees: Harðarson, Magnússon (ISL)

==== Group 2 ====
Pos	Team	Pld	W	D	L	GF	GA	GD	Pts	Qualification
1	Denmark	6	6	0	0	203	132	+71	12	Semifinals
2	Hungary	6	4	0	2	187	147	+40	8	Semifinals
3	Czech Republic	6	2	0	4	157	182	−25	4	
4	Turkey	6	0	0	6	149	235	−86	0	

Source: EHF
Rules for classification: 1) points; 2) head-to-head points; 3) head-to-head goal difference; 4) head-to-head number of goals scored; 5) goal difference.

15 October 2025; 20:00	Denmark	41–25	Czech Republic	Spar Nord BOXEN, Nykøbing Falster; Attendance: 2,631; Referees: Fabryczny, Rawicki (POL)
15 October 2025; 20:00	Tranborg 7	(21–12)	Cholevová 8	Spar Nord BOXEN, Nykøbing Falster; Attendance: 2,631; Referees: Fabryczny, Rawicki (POL)
15 October 2025; 20:00	3× (suspension)	Report	2× (suspension)	Spar Nord BOXEN, Nykøbing Falster; Attendance: 2,631; Referees: Fabryczny, Rawicki (POL)

16 October 2025; 19:00	Hungary	43–30	Turkey	Kanizsa Aréna, Nagykanizsa; Attendance: 2,977; Referees: Sekulić, Jovandić (SRB)
16 October 2025; 19:00	Simon 6	(19–15)	Akgün 6	Kanizsa Aréna, Nagykanizsa; Attendance: 2,977; Referees: Sekulić, Jovandić (SRB)
16 October 2025; 19:00	1× (yellow card) 1× (suspension)	Report	1× (yellow card)	Kanizsa Aréna, Nagykanizsa; Attendance: 2,977; Referees: Sekulić, Jovandić (SRB)

19 October 2025; 17:00	Turkey	24–41	Denmark	THF Sports Hall, Ankara; Attendance: 1,200; Referees: Pirvu, Potirniche (ROU)
19 October 2025; 17:00	Tügel 5	(9–20)	Østergaard 7	THF Sports Hall, Ankara; Attendance: 1,200; Referees: Pirvu, Potirniche (ROU)
19 October 2025; 17:00	3× (suspension)	Report	1× (yellow card) 3× (suspension)	THF Sports Hall, Ankara; Attendance: 1,200; Referees: Pirvu, Potirniche (ROU)

19 October 2025; 19:00	Czech Republic	20–31	Hungary	UNYP Arena, Prague; Attendance: 1,895; Referees: Praštalo, Balvan (BIH)
19 October 2025; 19:00	Malá 5	(9–15)	Klujber 6	UNYP Arena, Prague; Attendance: 1,895; Referees: Praštalo, Balvan (BIH)
19 October 2025; 19:00	4× (suspension)	Report	1× (suspension)	UNYP Arena, Prague; Attendance: 1,895; Referees: Praštalo, Balvan (BIH)

4 March 2026; 17:00	Turkey	26–34	Czech Republic	Kastamonu Merkez Spor Salonu, Kastamonu; Attendance: 4,000; Referees: Brodić, Hodžić (CRO)
4 March 2026; 17:00	Akgün 6	(11–18)	Desortová 8	Kastamonu Merkez Spor Salonu, Kastamonu; Attendance: 4,000; Referees: Brodić, Hodžić (CRO)
4 March 2026; 17:00	4× (suspension)	Report	1× (yellow card) 3× (suspension)	Kastamonu Merkez Spor Salonu, Kastamonu; Attendance: 4,000; Referees: Brodić, Hodžić (CRO)

5 March 2026; 18:00	Hungary	19–21	Denmark	Tatabányai Multifunkcionális Sportcsarnok, Tatabánya; Attendance: 5,138; Referees: Bočáková, Jánošíková (SVK)
5 March 2026; 18:00	Simon 5	(9–9)	Højlund 6	Tatabányai Multifunkcionális Sportcsarnok, Tatabánya; Attendance: 5,138; Referees: Bočáková, Jánošíková (SVK)
5 March 2026; 18:00	1× (yellow card) 1× (suspension)	Report	4× (suspension)	Tatabányai Multifunkcionális Sportcsarnok, Tatabánya; Attendance: 5,138; Referees: Bočáková, Jánošíková (SVK)

7 March 2026; 17:30	Czech Republic	36–24	Turkey	Datart Hala, Zlín; Attendance: 1,980; Referees: Stancu (ROU), Pepe ( ITA)
7 March 2026; 17:30	Desortová 8	(17–12)	Gökdemir, Tügel 6	Datart Hala, Zlín; Attendance: 1,980; Referees: Stancu (ROU), Pepe ( ITA)
7 March 2026; 17:30	1× (yellow card) 1× (suspension)	Report	1× (yellow card) 4× (suspension)	Datart Hala, Zlín; Attendance: 1,980; Referees: Stancu (ROU), Pepe ( ITA)

8 March 2026; 16:00	Denmark	31–22	Hungary	Arena Svendborg, Svendborg; Attendance: 3,203; Referees: Picard, Vauchez (FRA)
8 March 2026; 16:00	Jørgensen 8	(14–7)	Vámos 5	Arena Svendborg, Svendborg; Attendance: 3,203; Referees: Picard, Vauchez (FRA)
8 March 2026; 16:00	1× (yellow card) 3× (suspension)	Report	3× (suspension)	Arena Svendborg, Svendborg; Attendance: 3,203; Referees: Picard, Vauchez (FRA)

8 April 2026; 18:00	Turkey	23–42	Hungary	Hasan Dağı Spor Salonu, Aksaray; Attendance: 3,000; Referees: Bujupi, Bujupi (KOS)
8 April 2026; 18:00	Öztürk 8	(14–22)	Klujber, Márton 7	Hasan Dağı Spor Salonu, Aksaray; Attendance: 3,000; Referees: Bujupi, Bujupi (KOS)
8 April 2026; 18:00	3× (suspension)	Report	1× (suspension)	Hasan Dağı Spor Salonu, Aksaray; Attendance: 3,000; Referees: Bujupi, Bujupi (KOS)

9 April 2026; 17:30	Czech Republic	20–30	Denmark	UNYP Arena, Prague; Attendance: 1,503; Referees: Jerlecki, Łabuń (POL)
9 April 2026; 17:30	Desortová 10	(7–17)	Jørgensen, Scaglione 6	UNYP Arena, Prague; Attendance: 1,503; Referees: Jerlecki, Łabuń (POL)
9 April 2026; 17:30	1× (yellow card)	Report	1× (yellow card)	UNYP Arena, Prague; Attendance: 1,503; Referees: Jerlecki, Łabuń (POL)

11 April 2026; 18:00	Hungary	30–22	Czech Republic	Érd Aréna, Érd; Attendance: 1,848; Referees: Yovchev, Yonchev (BUL)
11 April 2026; 18:00	Klujber 8	(16–13)	Desortová 7	Érd Aréna, Érd; Attendance: 1,848; Referees: Yovchev, Yonchev (BUL)
11 April 2026; 18:00	1× (yellow card) 6× (suspension)	Report	1× (yellow card) 4× (suspension)	Érd Aréna, Érd; Attendance: 1,848; Referees: Yovchev, Yonchev (BUL)

12 April 2026; 16:00	Denmark	39–22	Turkey	Sydbank Arena, Kolding; Attendance: 2,057; Referees: Watson, Welin (SWE)
12 April 2026; 16:00	Halilcevic 8	(22–14)	Bozdoğan 5	Sydbank Arena, Kolding; Attendance: 2,057; Referees: Watson, Welin (SWE)
12 April 2026; 16:00		Report	3× (suspension)	Sydbank Arena, Kolding; Attendance: 2,057; Referees: Watson, Welin (SWE)

=== Knockout stage ===
==== Bracket ====
Semi-finals
26 September
Norway	27
Hungary	23
26 September
Denmark	28
Romania	20

Final
27 September
Norway	30
Denmark	34
Third place
27 September
Hungary	30
Romania	33

==== Semifinals ====
26 September 2026; 13:15	Norway	27–23	Hungary	Polyvalent Hall, Bucharest; Attendance: 2,700; Referees: Balvan, Prastalo (BIH)
26 September 2026; 13:15	Reistad 11	(17–13)	Klujber 9	Polyvalent Hall, Bucharest; Attendance: 2,700; Referees: Balvan, Prastalo (BIH)
26 September 2026; 13:15	5× (suspension)	Report	4× (suspension)	Polyvalent Hall, Bucharest; Attendance: 2,700; Referees: Balvan, Prastalo (BIH)

26 September 2026; 16:00	Denmark	28–20	Romania	Polyvalent Hall, Bucharest; Attendance: 3,015; Referees: Oyarzun, Zaragueta (ESP)
26 September 2026; 16:00	Friis, Østergaard 5	(17–16)	Roșu 5	Polyvalent Hall, Bucharest; Attendance: 3,015; Referees: Oyarzun, Zaragueta (ESP)
26 September 2026; 16:00	1× (yellow card) 3× (suspension)	Report	2× (suspension)	Polyvalent Hall, Bucharest; Attendance: 3,015; Referees: Oyarzun, Zaragueta (ESP)

==== Third place game ====
27 September 2026; 13:15	Hungary	30–33	Romania	Polyvalent Hall, Bucharest; Attendance: 3,520; Referees: Oyarzun, Zaragueta (ESP)
27 September 2026; 13:15	Klujber 11	(16–16)	Laslo 7	Polyvalent Hall, Bucharest; Attendance: 3,520; Referees: Oyarzun, Zaragueta (ESP)
27 September 2026; 13:15	4× (suspension)	Report	1× (yellow card) 2× (suspension)	Polyvalent Hall, Bucharest; Attendance: 3,520; Referees: Oyarzun, Zaragueta (ESP)

==== Final ====
27 September 2026; 16:00	Norway	30–34	Denmark	Polyvalent Hall, Bucharest; Attendance: 2,500; Referees: Balvan, Prastalo (BIH)
27 September 2026; 16:00	Reistad 10	(15–17)	Østergaard 8	Polyvalent Hall, Bucharest; Attendance: 2,500; Referees: Balvan, Prastalo (BIH)
27 September 2026; 16:00	2× (suspension)	Report	1× (yellow card) 2× (suspension)	Polyvalent Hall, Bucharest; Attendance: 2,500; Referees: Balvan, Prastalo (BIH)

== Qualified teams ==
Team	Qualification method	Date of qualification	Appearance(s)				Previous best performance (Note: Bold text indicates they hosted that edition.)	Rank
Team	Qualification method	Date of qualification	Total	First	Last	Streak	Previous best performance	Rank
Czech Republic	Co-hosts	8 March 2024	9th	1994	2024	2	Eighth place (1994, 2002)	TBD
Poland	Co-hosts	8 March 2024	10th	1996	2024	7	Fifth place (1998)	TBD
Romania	Co-hosts	8 March 2024	16th	1994	2024	10	Third place (2010)	TBD
Slovakia	Co-hosts	8 March 2024	4th	1994	2024	2	Twelfth place (1994, 2014)	TBD
Turkey	Co-hosts	8 March 2024	2nd	2024	2024	2	Twentieth place (2024)	TBD
Denmark	Top three at 2024 edition	13 December 2024	17th	1994	2024	17	Champions (1994, 1996, 2002)	TBD
Norway	Top three at 2024 edition	13 December 2024	17th	1994	2024	17	Champions (Ten times) (Note: Norway have won in 1998, 2004, 2006, 2008, 2010, 2014, 2016, 2020, 2022 and 2024.)	TBD
Hungary	Top three at 2024 edition	15 December 2024	17th	1994	2024	17	Champions (2000)	TBD
Sweden	Group 5 top two	7 March 2026	15th	1994	2024	13	Runners-up (2010)	TBD
Spain	Group 6 top two	7 March 2026	15th	1998	2024	13	Runners-up (2008, 2014)	TBD
Netherlands	Group 2 top two	8 March 2026	11th	1994	2024	7	Runners-up (2016)	TBD
Germany	Group 3 top two	8 March 2026	17th	1994	2024	17	Runners-up (1994)	TBD
France	Group 1 top two	8 March 2026	14th	2000	2024	14	Champions (2018)	TBD
Slovenia	Group 3 top two	8 April 2026	10th	2002	2024	6	Eighth place (2022)	TBD
Croatia	Group 1 top two	9 April 2026	14th	1994	2024	12	Third place (2020)	TBD
Switzerland	Group 2 top two	9 April 2026	3rd	2022	2024	3	Twelfth place (2024)	TBD
Montenegro	Group 4 top two	9 April 2026	9th	2010	2024	9	Champions (2012)	TBD
Faroe Islands	Group 4 top two	9 April 2026	2nd	2024	2024	2	Seventeenth place (2024)	TBD
Austria	Group 6 top two	12 April 2026	10th	1994	2024	2	Third place (1996)	TBD
Serbia	Group 5 top two	12 April 2026	11th	2006	2024	11	Fourth place (2012)	TBD
Greece	Four best third place teams	12 April 2026	1st	Debut				TBD
Iceland	Four best third place teams	12 April 2026	4th	2010	2024	2	Fiftheenth place (2010, 2012)	TBD
North Macedonia	Four best third place teams	12 April 2026	8th	1998	2024	3	Seventh place (2008)	TBD
Ukraine	Four best third place teams	12 April 2026	12th	1994	2024	2	Runners-up (2000)	TBD
