= 2027 World Women's Handball Championship – European qualification =

The European qualification for the 2027 World Women's Handball Championship, in Hungary will be played over two rounds.

In the first round of qualification, eight teams who will play playoff matches with the winners advancing to the second phase, where the teams will be joined by the remaining teams from the European Championship and play play-off games to determine the qualified teams.

== Qualification phase 1 ==
=== Seeding ===
The draw was held on 14 July 2026 in Vienna, Austria. The winner of each tie advanced to the play-off round. The games were played on 21 and 22 October and 24 and 25 October 2026.

Pot 1	Pot 2
Kosovo; Italy; Lithuania; Luxembourg	Bulgaria; Great Britain; Belgium; Estonia

=== Overview ===
Team 1	Agg.	Team 2	1st leg	2nd leg
Estonia	49–64	Kosovo	22–39	27–25
Belgium	39–55	Lithuania	19–27	20–28
Bulgaria	50–54	Italy	23–27	27–27
Great Britain	47–37	Luxembourg	20–22	27–15

=== Matches ===
23 October 2026; 20:00	Estonia	22–39	Kosovo	Palace of Youth and Sports, Pristina, Kosovo; Attendance: 820; Referees: Brodić, Hodžić (CRO)
23 October 2026; 20:00	Gorbatsjova, Molkova 6	(10–19)	M. Qorraj 13	Palace of Youth and Sports, Pristina, Kosovo; Attendance: 820; Referees: Brodić, Hodžić (CRO)
23 October 2026; 20:00		Report	4× (suspension)	Palace of Youth and Sports, Pristina, Kosovo; Attendance: 820; Referees: Brodić, Hodžić (CRO)

24 October 2026; 17:00	Kosovo	25–27	Estonia	Palace of Youth and Sports, Pristina; Attendance: 200; Referees: Brodić, Hodžić (CRO)
24 October 2026; 17:00	M. Qorraj 9	(14–14)	Gorbatsjova 7	Palace of Youth and Sports, Pristina; Attendance: 200; Referees: Brodić, Hodžić (CRO)
24 October 2026; 17:00	2× (suspension)	Report	1× (suspension)	Palace of Youth and Sports, Pristina; Attendance: 200; Referees: Brodić, Hodžić (CRO)

Kosovo won 64–49 on aggregate.

21 October 2026; 17:15	Belgium	19–27	Lithuania	Sporthal Alverberg, Hasselt; Attendance: 650; Referees: Førsund, Hoxha (NOR)
21 October 2026; 17:15	Buelens 4	(10–16)	Pilikauskaitė 9	Sporthal Alverberg, Hasselt; Attendance: 650; Referees: Førsund, Hoxha (NOR)
21 October 2026; 17:15	3× (suspension)	Report	1× (yellow card) 4× (suspension)	Sporthal Alverberg, Hasselt; Attendance: 650; Referees: Førsund, Hoxha (NOR)

25 October 2026; 15:00	Lithuania	28–20	Belgium	Prienai Arena, Prienai; Attendance: 201; Referees: Carrino, Pellegrino (ITA)
25 October 2026; 15:00	Pilikauskaitė 9	(15–9)	Buelens 6	Prienai Arena, Prienai; Attendance: 201; Referees: Carrino, Pellegrino (ITA)
25 October 2026; 15:00	6× (suspension)	Report	1× (yellow card) 3× (suspension)	Prienai Arena, Prienai; Attendance: 201; Referees: Carrino, Pellegrino (ITA)

Lithuania won 55–39 on aggregate.

22 October 2026; 18:00	Bulgaria	23–27	Italy	AquaLife Arena, Kranevo; Attendance: 250; Referees: Petrović, Zrnić (SRB)
22 October 2026; 18:00	Sarandeva 6	(11–13)	Babbo, Manojlovic 6	AquaLife Arena, Kranevo; Attendance: 250; Referees: Petrović, Zrnić (SRB)
22 October 2026; 18:00	3× (suspension)	Report	1× (yellow card) 3× (suspension)	AquaLife Arena, Kranevo; Attendance: 250; Referees: Petrović, Zrnić (SRB)

25 October 2026; 19:00	Italy	27–27	Bulgaria	PalaGolfo, Follonica; Attendance: 1,700; Referees: Duplii, Karpushchenko (UKR)
25 October 2026; 19:00	Babbo, Barbosu 6	(15–13)	Kovacheva 12	PalaGolfo, Follonica; Attendance: 1,700; Referees: Duplii, Karpushchenko (UKR)
25 October 2026; 19:00	2× (suspension) 1× (red card)	Report	9× (suspension) 1× (red card)	PalaGolfo, Follonica; Attendance: 1,700; Referees: Duplii, Karpushchenko (UKR)

Italy won 54–50 on aggregate.

21 October 2026; 19:00	Great Britain	20–22	Luxembourg	Derby Arena, Derby; Attendance: 600; Referees: Bashev, Blazheva (BUL)
21 October 2026; 19:00	Kesselring 8	(6–8)	Dautaj 6	Derby Arena, Derby; Attendance: 600; Referees: Bashev, Blazheva (BUL)
21 October 2026; 19:00	2× (yellow card) 2× (suspension)	Report	2× (yellow card) 1× (suspension)	Derby Arena, Derby; Attendance: 600; Referees: Bashev, Blazheva (BUL)

25 October 2026; 16:00	Luxembourg	15–26	Great Britain	d'Coque, Luxembourg City; Attendance: 770; Referees: Carmaux, Diar (FRA)
25 October 2026; 16:00	Scheuren 3	(8–14)	Kesselring 9	d'Coque, Luxembourg City; Attendance: 770; Referees: Carmaux, Diar (FRA)
25 October 2026; 16:00	1× (yellow card) 4× (suspension)	Report	1× (yellow card) 3× (suspension)	d'Coque, Luxembourg City; Attendance: 770; Referees: Carmaux, Diar (FRA)

Great Britain won 47–37 on aggregate.

== Qualification phase 2 ==
The draw will take place on 19 December 2026. The four winners of phase 1 will join 18 teams. The games will be played on 7 and 8 April and 10 and 11 April 2027.

=== Teams ===
Teams
Austria
Croatia
Czech Republic
Denmark
Faroe Islands
France
Germany
Great Britain
Greece
Iceland
Italy
Kosovo
Lithuania
Montenegro
Netherlands
North Macedonia
Poland
Portugal
Romania
Serbia
Slovakia
Slovenia
Spain
Sweden
Switzerland
Turkey
Ukraine

=== Overview ===
Team 1	Agg.	Team 2	1st leg	2nd leg
	–		7–8 Apr	10–11 Apr
	–		7–8 Apr	10–11 Apr
	–		7–8 Apr	10–11 Apr
	–		7–8 Apr	10–11 Apr
	–		7–8 Apr	10–11 Apr
	–		7–8 Apr	10–11 Apr
	–		7–8 Apr	10–11 Apr
	–		7–8 Apr	10–11 Apr
	–		7–8 Apr	10–11 Apr
	–		7–8 Apr	10–11 Apr
	–		7–8 Apr	10–11 Apr
	–		7–8 Apr	10–11 Apr
