= Women's EHF Euro Cup =

European handball competition

- Sport: Handball
- Founded: 2021
- No. of teams: 8 (2026), 4 (2022,2024)
- Continent: Europe (EHF)
- Most recent champion: Denmark (1st title)
- Most titles: Norway (2 titles)

Women's EHF Euro Cup is a European handball competition for national teams, organized by the European Handball Federation (EHF). The reigning defending champions are Norway.

Teams, that automatically qualified for the next European Women's Handball Championship, play against each other in a four-team group. The tournament is played at the same time as the qualifying process for the European Championships. The inaugural edition of the tournament started in 2021, alongside the 2022 European Women's Handball Championship qualification.

== Qualification ==
Four teams participate in this competition. Qualification depends on how many hosts/co-host there are. For example, if there are three co-hosts, then only the European Women's Handball Championship champions will take part.

== Summary ==
Year	Winners	Runners-up	Third	Fourth
2022; Details	Norway	Montenegro	Slovenia	North Macedonia
2024; Details	Norway	Hungary	Switzerland	Austria
2026; Details	Denmark	Norway	Romania	Hungary

== Men's competition ==
Originally, the EHF Euro Cup started off with a Men's event in 2020.
