= Netherlands women's national handball team =

Netherlands

Information
- Nickname: Oranje Dames
- Association: Nederlands Handbal Verbond
- Coach: Henrik Signell
- Assistant coach: Ricardo Clarijs
- Most caps: Laura Robben (320)
- Most goals: Olga Assink (954)

Colours
1st	2nd

Results

Summer Olympics
- Appearances: 3 (First in 2016)
- Best result: 4th (2016)

World Championship
- Appearances: 15 (First in 1971)
- Best result: 1st (2019)

European Championship
- Appearances: 10 (First in 1998)
- Best result: 2nd (2016)
- Last updated on Unknown.

Netherlands women's national handball team
Medal record

World Championship
Gold medal – first place	2019 Japan	
Silver medal – second place	2015 Denmark	
Bronze medal – third place	2017 Germany	

European Championship
Silver medal – second place	2016 Sweden	
Bronze medal – third place	2018 France	

The Netherlands women's national handball team is the national handball team of the Netherlands. It is governed by the Nederlands Handbal Verbond (NHV).

The team won their first World Championship in 2019 in Japan after defeating Spain in the final.

== History ==
The Dutch women’s team would have been qualified as the host nation for the 2012 European Championship. However, the event had to be moved to Serbia at a late stage due to high costs and uncertain revenue for the Netherlands Handball Association. As a result, the Netherlands lost its host-nation berth and also received a heavy fine.

Netherlands failed to qualify for the 2009 World Championship because it lost both qualification matches against Ukraine. Things went better at the 2011 World Championship, where the team reached the final round and ultimately finished fifteenth. A fourth place in the group stage secured a spot in the round of 16, but there the Netherlands came up against the eventual world champion, Norway. The same scenario unfolded at the 2013 World Championship. In the final round, the team once again finished fourth in the group stage and faced the eventual world champion – this time Brazil – in the round of 16.

=== 2015-2020: Rise to Prominence ===
The breakthrough for the Dutch women’s team came at the 2015 World Championship in Denmark, where the Netherlands reached the final of a global tournament for the first time in history, finishing second after a 23–31 defeat to world champion Norway. It would mar the start of the Dutch golden generation, including players like Tess Wester, Lois Abbingh, Estavana Polman, Kelly Dulfer and Nycke Groot.

In 2016, the team achieved its second major success by qualifying for the 2016 Olympic Games in Rio de Janeiro. At an Olympic qualification tournament in Metz, France, the Netherlands defeated Tunisia, Japan, and hosts France, earning an Olympic berth for the first time ever. They finished fourth at the Games after a disappointing 26–36 loss to Norway in the bronze-medal match. In the semifinals, the Netherlands had narrowly lost to France. Gold went to Russia, who defeated France 22–19.

A few months later, at the 2016 European Championship in Sweden, the team achieved its third major success within a single year. Once again, and for the first time in European Championship history, the Netherlands reached the final, where they once more had to bow to world and European champion Norway—this time by the smallest possible margin: 29–30.

At the 2017 World Championship in Germany, the Dutch women’s team finished in third place after defeating Sweden 24–21 in the bronze-medal match. At the 2018 European Championship in France, the Dutch team once again reached the podium, finishing third after beating Romania 24–20 in the bronze-medal match. In that game, the Netherlands were exceptionally strong in defense: Romania managed to convert only 33% of their attacks.

At the 2019 World Championship in Japan, the Dutch women’s team achieved the greatest success in its history by becoming world champions. In a thrilling final, the Netherlands defeated Spain 30–29. The ending was dramatic: just over half a minute before the end, the Netherlands lost the ball, giving Spain the chance to run down the clock and look for a winning goal. Tess Wester saved the team with a brilliant stop, after which Hernández received a red card for obstructing Wester’s throw-out. With six seconds left, the Netherlands were awarded a penalty, which Lois Abbingh converted with nerves of steel. In the semifinal, the Netherlands had already beaten Olympic champion Russia 33–32, with Laura van der Heijden scoring the decisive goal in a true thriller.

For the 2020 Olympic Games in Japan, the Netherlands were automatically qualified as reigning world champions. Their second consecutive Olympics once again did not produce a medal. The team lost only narrowly to Norway (29–27) in the group stage and advanced to the quarterfinals as the second-placed team. There, they were overpowered 32–22 by the eventual champions, France. After reaching the World Championship podium three times in a row, the Netherlands were eliminated in the main round at the 2021 World Championship in Spain and finished ninth.

At the 2025 World Championship at home they reached a semifinal for the first time since 2019 when they beat Hungary in the quarterfinal. Afterwards, Lois Abbingh and Estavana Polman retired from the national team, marking the end of an era.

== Competitive record ==
=== Olympic Games ===
Year	Position	GP	W	D	L	GS	GA	GD
(Canada) 1976	Did not qualify							
(Soviet Union) 1980	Did not qualify							
(United States) 1984	Did not qualify							
(South Korea) 1988	Did not qualify							
(Spain) 1992	Did not qualify							
(United States) 1996	Did not qualify							
(Australia) 2000	Did not qualify							
(Greece) 2004	Did not qualify							
(China) 2008	Did not qualify							
(United Kingdom) 2012	Did not qualify							
(Brazil) 2016	4th	8	2	2	4	216	218	−2
(Japan) 2020	5th	6	4	0	2	191	175	+16
(France) 2024	5th	6	4	0	2	177	166	+11
Total	3/13	20	10	2	8	584	559	+25

=== World Championship ===
Year	Position	GP	W	D	L	GS	GA	GD
(Socialist Federal Republic of Yugoslavia) 1957	Did not enter							
(Romania) 1962	Did not enter							
(West Germany) 1965	Did not enter							
(Netherlands) 1971	8th	4	1	0	3	31	46	−15
(Socialist Federal Republic of Yugoslavia) 1973	12th	5	0	0	5	33	81	−48
(Soviet Union) 1975	Did not qualify							
(Czechoslovakia) 1978	9th	5	1	0	4	87	97	−10
(Hungary) 1982	Did not qualify							
(Netherlands) 1986	10th	7	2	0	5	127	163	−36
(South Korea) 1990	Did not qualify							
(Norway) 1993	Did not qualify							
(Austria) (Hungary) 1995	Did not qualify							
(Germany) 1997	Did not qualify							
(Denmark) (Norway) 1999	10th	6	4	0	2	140	127	+13
(Italy) 2001	16th	6	1	1	4	138	144	−6
(Croatia) 2003	Did not qualify							
(Russia) 2005	5th	9	6	1	2	262	242	+20
(France) 2007	Did not qualify							
(China) 2009	Did not qualify							
(Brazil) 2011	15th	6	2	0	4	186	176	+10
(Serbia) 2013	13th	6	2	0	4	170	150	+20
(Denmark) 2015	2nd	9	7	1	1	298	217	+81
(Germany) 2017	3rd	9	6	1	2	252	214	+38
(Japan) 2019	1st	10	7	0	3	328	280	+48
(Spain) 2021	9th	6	4	1	1	270	145	+125
(Denmark) (Norway) (Sweden) 2023	5th	9	8	0	1	289	216	+83
(Germany) (Netherlands) 2025	4th	9	7	0	2	285	219	+66
(Hungary) 2027	TBD							
(Spain) 2029	TBD							
(Czech Republic) (Poland) 2031	TBD							
Total	15/30	106	58	5	43	2906	2517	+389

=== European Championship ===
Year	Position	GP	W	D	L	GS	GA	GD
(Germany) 1994	Did not qualify							
(Denmark) 1996	Did not qualify							
(Netherlands) 1998	10th	6	1	0	5	126	153	−27
(Romania) 2000	Did not qualify							
(Denmark) 2002	14th	3	0	0	3	73	80	−7
(Hungary) 2004	Did not qualify							
(Sweden) 2006	15th	3	0	0	3	65	84	−19
(North Macedonia) 2008	Did not qualify							
(Denmark) (Norway) 2010	8th	6	2	0	4	131	145	−14
(Serbia) 2012	Withdrew							
(Hungary) (Croatia) 2014	7th	6	2	1	3	161	158	+3
(Sweden) 2016	2nd	8	6	0	2	227	201	+26
(France) 2018	3rd	8	6	0	2	207	196	+11
(Denmark) (Norway) 2020	6th	7	3	0	4	193	196	−3
(Slovenia) (North Macedonia) (Montenegro) 2022	6th	7	3	1	3	214	196	+18
(Austria) (Hungary) (Switzerland) 2024	6th	8	5	0	3	241	215	+26
(Czech Republic) (Poland) (Romania) (Slovakia) (Turkey) 2026	Qualified							
(Denmark) (Norway) (Sweden) 2028	TBD							
(Belgium) (France) 2030	TBD							
(Denmark) (Germany) (Poland) 2032	TBD							
Total	11/20	54	23	2	29	1397	1409	–12

=== Other tournaments ===
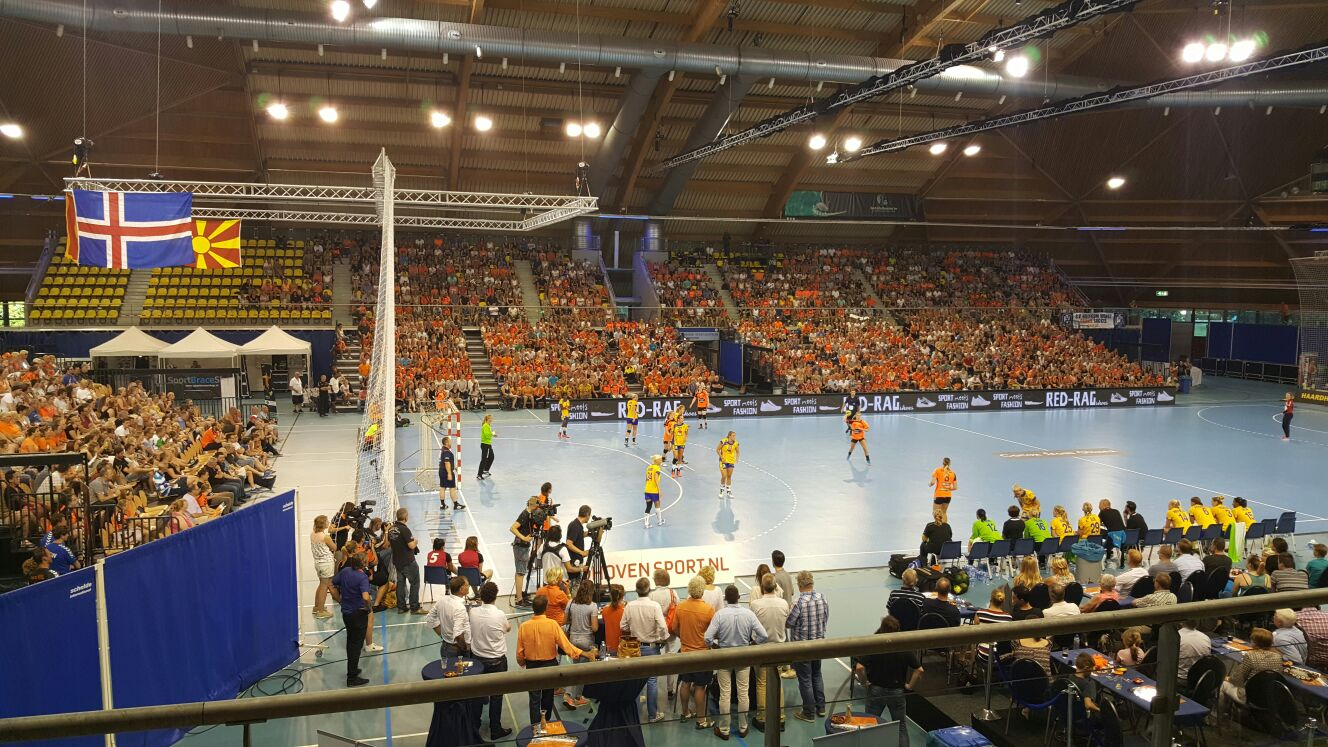
Netherlands during a friendly match against Sweden in 2016

- Carpathian Trophy 2004 – Third place
- Holland Handball Tournament 2006 – Fifth place
- Carpathian Trophy 2016 – Third place
- Intersport Cup 2022 - Winner

== Team ==
=== Current squad ===
The squad for the 2026 European Women's Handball Championship.

Head coach: Henrik Signell

Caps and goals as of 29 October 2026.

No.	Pos.	Name	Date of birth (age)	Height	App.	Goals	Club
4	RB	Alieke van Maurik	11 May 2005 (age 21)	1.81 m	35	50	(Germany) Borussia Dortmund
10	LB	Isa Ternede	26 January 2001 (age 25)	1.68 m	17	25	(Germany) Buxtehuder SV
12	LW	Bo van Wetering	5 October 1999 (age 27)	1.72 m	128	437	(Hungary) Győri ETO KC
17	LB	Kim Molenaar	28 April 2002 (age 24)	1.78 m	49	43	(Sweden) IK Sävehof
18	LB	Kelly Dulfer	21 March 1994 (age 32)	1.85 m	216	357	(Hungary) Győri ETO KC
19	P	Merel Freriks	6 January 1998 (age 28)	1.75 m	117	217	(Germany) Borussia Dortmund
20	CB	Inger Smits	17 September 1994 (age 32)	1.79 m	116	204	(Romania) SCM Râmnicu Vâlcea
22	LW	Zoë Sprengers	19 January 2000 (age 26)	1.66 m	84	184	(Romania) SCM Râmnicu Vâlcea
24	P	Romée Maarschalkerweerd	24 September 2004 (age 22)	1.78 m	37	79	(Denmark) Odense Håndbold
26	RW	Angela Malestein	31 January 1993 (age 33)	1.70 m	248	887	(Hungary) Ferencvárosi TC
30	GK	Rinka Duijndam	6 August 1997 (age 29)	1.78 m	122	5	(France) Chambray Touraine Handball
31	RW	Kelly Vollebregt	1 January 1995 (age 31)	1.67 m	65	133	(Germany) Borussia Dortmund
35	CB	Ivana Kwakman	16 August 2009 (age 17)	1.78 m	1	4	(Netherlands) VOC Amsterdam
38	GK	Yara ten Holte	23 November 1999 (age 26)	1.75 m	93	4	(Denmark) Odense Håndbold
44	P	Nikita van der Vliet	14 March 2000 (age 26)	1.71 m	75	143	(Denmark) Odense Håndbold
48	RB	Dione Housheer	26 September 1999 (age 27)	1.80 m	128	456	(Hungary) Győri ETO KC

=== Coaching staff ===
Role	Name	Start date
Head coach	(Sweden) Henrik Signell	2024
Assistant coach	(Netherlands) Ricardo Clarijs	September 2021
Goalkeeping coach	(Netherlands) Jasmina Janković	September 2022
Team Leader	(Netherlands) Maike Willems	September 2019
Physiotherapist	(Netherlands) Rinke van den Brink	September 2021

=== Notable players ===
MVP

- Nycke Groot (centre back), 2016 European Championship
- Estavana Polman (centre back), 2019 World Championship

Top Scorer

- Lois Abbingh (left back) with 71 goals, 2019 World Championship

All-Star Team members

- Pearl van der Wissel (left back), 2005 World Championship
- Tess Wester (goalkeeper), 2015 World Championship, 2019 World Championship
- Nycke Groot (centre back), 2016 European Championship
- Lois Abbingh (left back), 2017 World Championship
- Yvette Broch (line player), 2016 European Championship, 2017 World Championship
- Kelly Dulfer (defender), 2018 European Championship
- Estavana Polman (centre back), 2019 World Championship
- Dione Housheer (right back), 2025 World Championship

Coaches

- (Netherlands) Toon Wijdeveld (1956–1957)
- (Netherlands) Paul Broere (1960)
- (Netherlands) Jan Kloen (1961–1966, 1968)
- (Czech Republic) Jaroslav Mráz (1968–1971)
- (Netherlands) Jo Gerris (1971–1973)
- (Netherlands) Jan Alma (1973–1974)
- (Germany) Heinz Henneberg (1974–1975)
- (Netherlands) George van Noesel (1975–1976)
- (Netherlands) Jan Alma (1976–1978)
- (Netherlands) Simon Flendrie (1979)
- (Netherlands) Ilona Venema-Ignácz (1979–1981)
- (Slovakia) Jan Kecskeméthy (1982–1986)
- (Netherlands) Jan Tuik (1986)
- (Netherlands) Ton van Linder (1987–1990)
- (Netherlands) Bert Bouwer (1990–2003)
- (Norway) Kari Aagaard (2003)
- (Germany) Olaf Schimpf (2003–2004)
- (Netherlands) Sjors Röttger (2004–2008)
- (Netherlands) Henk Groener (2009–2016)
- (Denmark) Helle Thomsen (2016–2018)
- (France) Emmanuel Mayonnade (2019–2021)
- (Netherlands) Monique Tijsterman (2021)
- (Netherlands) Ricardo Clarijs (2022)
- (Sweden) Per Johansson (2022–2024)
- (Sweden) Henrik Signell (2024–)

=== Individual all-time records ===
Still active players are highlighted

==== Most matches played ====
Total number of matches played for the senior national team.

#	Player	Matches	Goals
1	Laura Robben	320	10
2	Diane Lamein	302	632
3	Laura van der Heijden	297	875
4	Angela Malestein	248	887
5	Monique Feijen	246	591
6	Lois Abbingh	241	930
7	Carla Kleintjens	225	756
8	Pearl van der Wissel	217	560
9	Kelly Dulfer	216	357
10	Diane Roelofsen	212	300

Last updated: 9 April 2026

==== Most goals scored ====
Total number of goals scored in official matches only.

#	Player	Goals	Matches	Average
1	Olga Assink	954	203	4.69
2	Lois Abbingh	930	241	3.86
3	Angela Malestein	887	248	3.57
4	Laura van der Heijden	875	297	2.94
5	Carla Kleintjens	756	225	3.36
6	Estavana Polman	685	207	3.31
7	Saskia Mulder	627	176	3.56
8	Diane Lamein	623	302	2.06
9	Monique Feijen	591	246	2.40
10	Pearl van der Wissel	560	221	2.58

Last updated: 9 April 2026
