= Diane Lamein =

Dutch handball player (born 1979)

Personal information
- Nationality: Dutch
- Born: 18 October 1979 (age 47) Amsterdam, Netherlands
- Height: 171 cm (67 in)

Sport
- Sport: Handball
- Position: Back
- Current club: retired

Youth career
- Years: Team
- –: O.S.C Amsterdam
- –: Aalsmeer
- –: Van Riet Nieuwegein
- –: VOC Amsterdam
- –: Bayer 04 Leverkusen

Senior clubs
- Years: Team
- –2004: TV Lützellinden
- 2004–2007: VfL Oldenburg
- 2010–2013: Buxtehuder SV
National team
Years	Team	Apps	(Gls)
1996–2012	Netherlands	302	(623)

Diane Lamein (born 18 October 1979) is a Dutch retired team handball player. She played on the Dutch national team, and participated at the 2011 World Women's Handball Championship in Brazil.

With 302 caps she has the second most matches on the Dutch national team ever, as well as 8th most goals with 623.
