= Henrik Signell =

Swedish handball player and coach (born 1976)

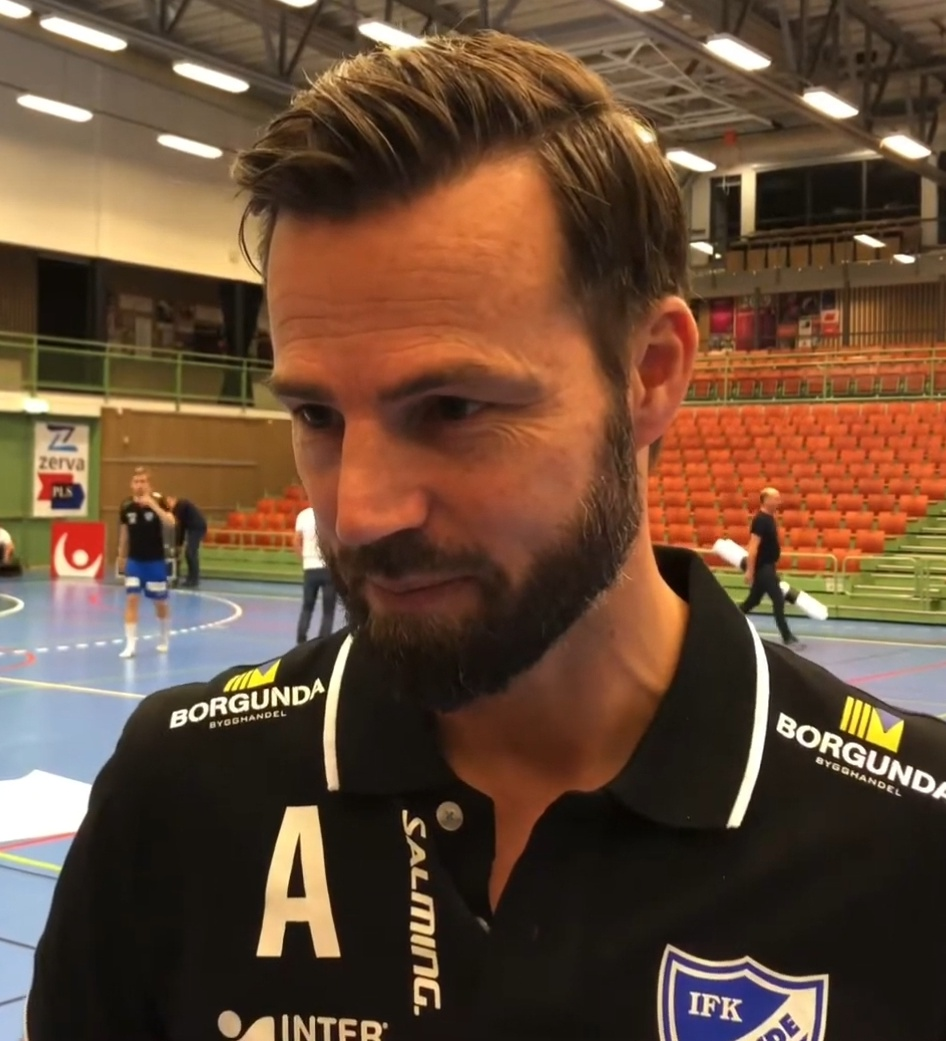

Personal information
- Nationality: Swedish
- Born: 2 January 1976 (age 50) Partille, Sweden

Sport
- Sport: Handball
- Position: Centre back

Senior clubs
- Years: Team
- 1993–1997: IK Sävehof
- 1997–1998: Partille IF
- 1998–2003: IK Sävehof
- 2003–2005: Alingsås HK
National team
Years	Team	Apps	(Gls)
1994	Sweden	1	(1)

Teams managed
- 2005–2010: IK Sävehof (men's junior team)
- 2010–2012: IK Sävehof (men, assistant)
- 2010–2012: Finland women (assistant)
- 2012–2018: IK Sävehof (women)
- 2016–2020: Sweden women
- 2020–2023: IFK Skövde (men)
- 2023–2024: South Korea women
- 2024–: Netherlands women
- 2025–: Larvik HK

Henrik Signell (born 2 January 1976 in Gothenburg) is a Swedish handball coach and former handball player, who coaches the Netherlands women's national team and Larvik HK. He has previously coached South Korean women's national team and the Sweden women's national team.

== Playing career ==
Signell started playing handball at IK Sävehof. He debuted for the senior team already as a teenager in the 1997/98 season. He then joined Partille IF for one season, and then returned to IK Sävehof. In 2003 he joined league rivals Alingsås HK, where he played for two seasons before retiring in 2005 due to injuries.

He played a single game for the Swedish men's national team, a match against Finland where he scored two goals.

== Coaching career ==
Right after retirement he took over the IK Sävehof youth team. Here he won the Swedish youth championship three times and came in second two times.

In 2010 he became both the assistant coach at IK Sävehof senior men's team and the assistant coach at the Finland women's national team.

In 2012 he became head coach for the first time when he took over IK Sävehofs women's team. Here he won the Swedish championship 5 times, including four championships in a row from 2013 to 2016.

In 2016 he took over as the head coach of Swedens women's national team, while still managing at club level. After the 2017/18 season he retired as the IK Sävehof to focus on the national team full time.

In 2020 he stopped as the head coach of Sweden and was replaced by Tomas Axnér. The day after he was announced the coach of IFK Skövde HK men's team from the upcoming season. He was in this position until 2023, where we was replaced by Icelandic Jónatan Magnússon.

Between April 2023 and 2024 he was the headcoach of the South Korean women's national team with fellow swede Erik Larholm as his assistant. He guided them at 2023 World Women's Handball Championship, where South Korea proceeded from the group stage, but was knocked out in the main stage in last place in their group. At the 2024 Olympics, where South Korea was knocked out in the group stage with 1 win and 4 losses.

In 2024 he became the head coach of the Netherlands women's national team. His first major international tournament with the Netherlands was the 2024 European Women's Handball Championship where he the Netherlands finished 6th.

In 2025 he signed a three-year contract to become the head coach at Norwegian top club Larvik HK, but already in February 2026 he announced his intention to leave the team after the 2025-26 season, as he could not combine his coaching responsibility Larvik with his family life in Göteborg.

== Achievements as a coach ==
- 5 Swedish Championship Gold Medals (women): 2013, 2014, 2015, 2016, 2018
- 2 Swedish Championship Gold Medals (men, as assistant coach)
- 3 Swedish Junior Championship Gold Medals (men)
