= 2006 Women's Holland Handball Tournament =

Official logo

The 2006 Women's Holland Handball Tournament was held at the Topsportcentrum Rotterdam in Rotterdam. The tournament started on 2 November 2006, with the final match played on 5 November. Brazil had already secured their win in the tournament with one match remaining. They also won their last match against the hosts, finishing with a perfect record of five wins, scoring a total of 163 goals while conceding only 123.

== Results ==
Team	Pts	Pld	W	L	PF	PA
Brazil	10	5	5	0	163	123
Portugal	6	5	3	2	143	140
Czech Republic	4	5	2	3	145	144
Iceland	4	5	2	3	141	141
Netherlands	4	5	2	3	125	144
Austria	2	5	1	4	132	147

November 1, 2006

Netherlands	32–27	Iceland
Czech Republic	34–28	Austria
Portugal	24–33	Brazil

November 2, 2006

Netherlands	20–34	Portugal
Brazil	34–22	Czech Republic
Iceland	30–26	Austria

November 3, 2006

Portugal	26–33	Iceland
Austria	27–32	Brazil
Netherlands	30–28	Czech Republic

November 4, 2006

Portugal	29–26	Czech Republic
Iceland	28–32	Brazil
Netherlands	21–23	Austria

November 5, 2006

Iceland	23–25	Czech Republic
Netherlands	22–32	Brazil
Portugal	30–28	Austria
