= Jovana Kiprijanovska =

Macedonian female handballer

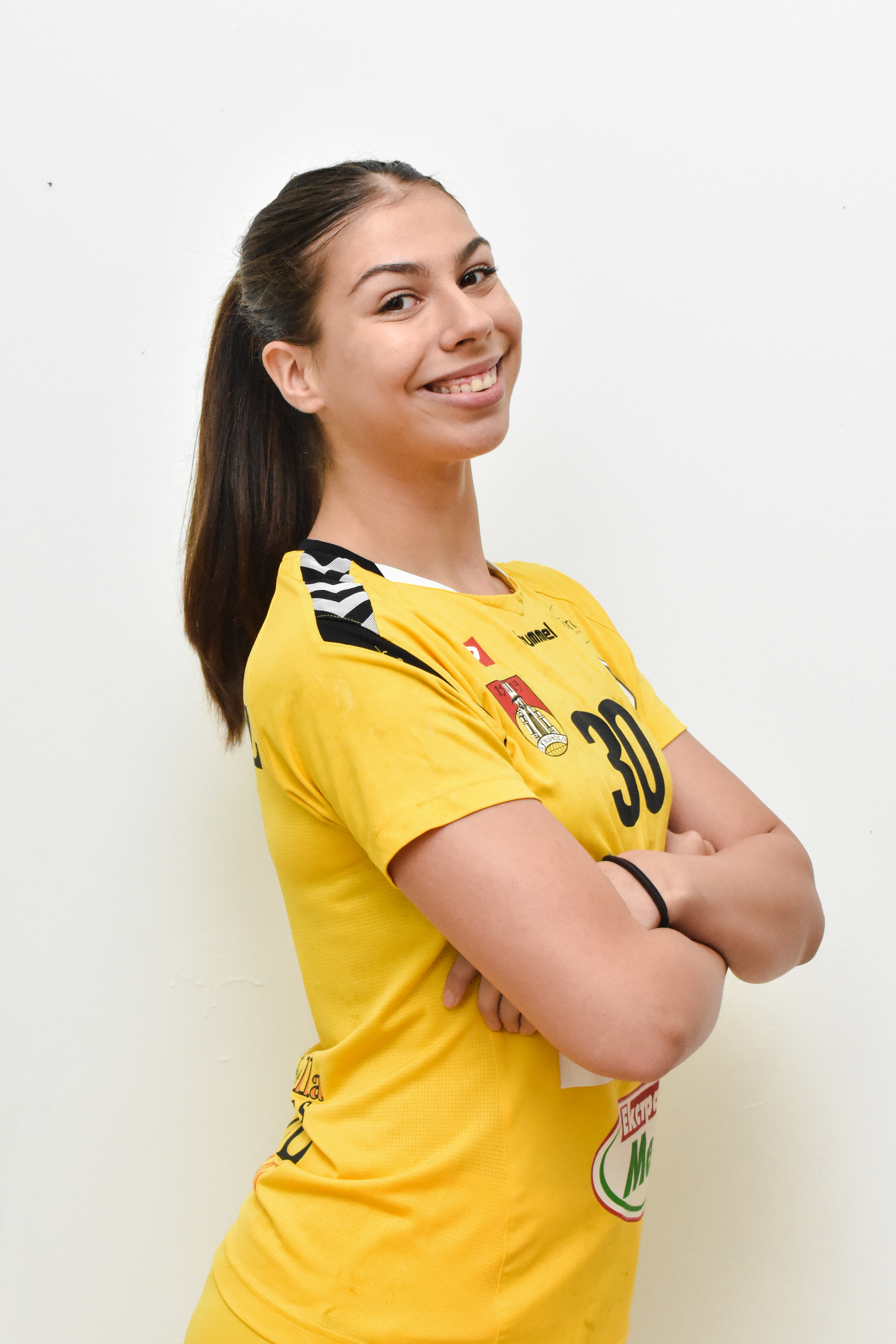

Personal information
- Nationality: Macedonian
- Born: 30 December 2001 (age 24) Kumanovo, Macedonia
- Height: 1.84 m (6 ft 0 in)

Sport
- Sport: Handball
- Position: Right back
- Current club: Szombathelyi KKA
- Number: 30

Senior clubs
- Years: Team
- 2016–2021: ŽRK Kumanovo
- 2022–2025: Sambre-Avesnois Handball
- 2025–: Szombathelyi KKA
National team
Years	Team	Apps	(Gls)
2020–	North Macedonia	20	(17)

Jovana Kiprijanovska (born 30 December 2001) is a Macedonian female handballer for the Hungarian club Szombathelyi KKA and the North Macedonia national team.

She represented the North Macedonia at the 2022 European Women's Handball Championship.

== Accomplishments ==
=== Domestic competitions (North Macedonia) ===
- Champions

: 2020, 2021

- Macedonian Cup

: 2019, 2021
