= Elena Roșu =

Romanian handball player (born 1997)

Personal information
- Nationality: Romanian
- Born: 24 March 1997 (age 29) Galați, Romania
- Height: 1.80 m (5 ft 11 in)

Sport
- Sport: Handball
- Position: Centre back
- Current club: Dunărea Brăila
- Number: 24
National team
Years	Team	Apps	(Gls)
2019–	Romania	8	(6)

Elena Roșu (born Dache 24 March 1997) is a Romanian handball player for Dunărea Brăila and the Romanian national team.

She represented Romania at the 2019 World Women's Handball Championship.
