= European Women's Handball Championship =

International handball competition in Europe for women's national teams

- Current season, competition or edition: 2026 European Women's Handball Championship
- Sport: Handball
- Founded: 1994; 32 years ago
- No. of teams: 16 (finals)
- Continent: Europe (EHF)
- Most recent champion: Norway (10th title)
- Most titles: Norway (10 titles)

The European Women's Handball Championship is the official competition for senior women's national handball teams of Europe, and takes place every two years. In addition to crowning the European champions, the tournament also serves as a qualifying tournament for the Olympic Games and World Championship. As of December 2024, the only teams that have ever won the championship are Norway (ten times), Denmark (three times), Hungary, Montenegro and France (each once).

== History ==
In year 1946, the International Handball Federation was founded by eight European nations, and though non-European nations competed at the World Championships, the medals had always been taken by European nations. European Handball Federation is founded in 1991. At the same time (1995), the World Championship was changed from a quadrennial to a biannual event, and the European Handball Federation now began its own championship – which also acted as a regional qualifier for the World Championship. The tournament will be expanded to 24 teams in 2024 to take place in Austria, Hungary and Switzerland.

== Tournaments ==
Year	Host	Final			Third place match			Teams
Year	Host	Champions	Score	Runners-up	Third place	Score	Fourth place	Teams
1994; Details	Germany	Denmark	27–23	Germany	Norway	24–19	Hungary	12
1996; Details	Denmark	Denmark	25–23	Norway	Austria	30–23	Germany	12
1998; Details	Netherlands	Norway	24–16	Denmark	Hungary	30–24	Austria	12
2000; Details	Romania	Hungary	32–30 (ET)	Ukraine	Russia	21–16	Romania	12
2002; Details	Denmark	Denmark	25–22	Norway	France	27–22	Russia	16
2004; Details	Hungary	Norway	27–25	Denmark	Hungary	29–25	Russia	16
2006; Details	Sweden	Norway	27–24	Russia	France	29–25	Germany	16
2008; Details	(North Macedonia); Macedonia	Norway	34–21	Spain	Russia	24–21	Germany	16
2010; Details	Denmark / Norway	Norway	25–20	Sweden	Romania	16–15	Denmark	16
2012; Details	Serbia	Montenegro	34–31 (2ET)	Norway	Hungary	41–38 (ET)	Serbia	16
2014; Details	Croatia / Hungary	Norway	28–25	Spain	Sweden	25–23	Montenegro	16
2016; Details	Sweden	Norway	30–29	Netherlands	France	25–22	Denmark	16
2018; Details	France	France	24–21	Russia	Netherlands	24–20	Romania	16
2020; Details	Denmark	Norway	22–20	France	Croatia	25–19	Denmark	16
2022; Details	Montenegro / North Macedonia / Slovenia	Norway	27–25	Denmark	Montenegro	27–25 (ET)	France	16
2024; Details	Austria / Hungary / Switzerland	Norway	31–23	Denmark	Hungary	25–24	France	24
2026; Details	Czech Republic / Poland / Romania / Slovakia / Turkey							24
2028; Details	Denmark / Norway / Sweden							24
2030; Details	Belgium / France							24
2032; Details	Denmark / Germany / Poland							24

== Medal table ==
Rank	Nation	Gold	Silver	Bronze	Total
1	Norway	10	3	1	14
2	Denmark	3	4	0	7
3	France	1	1	3	5
4	Hungary	1	0	4	5
5	Montenegro	1	0	1	2
6	Russia	0	2	2	4
7	Spain	0	2	0	2
8	Netherlands	0	1	1	2
8	Sweden	0	1	1	2
10	Germany	0	1	0	1
10	Ukraine	0	1	0	1
12	Austria	0	0	1	1
12	Croatia	0	0	1	1
12	Romania	0	0	1	1
Totals (14 entries)		16	16	16	48

== Statistics ==
=== Summary (1994–2024) ===
Source (Table Section):

Rank	Team	Part	M	W	D	L	GF	GA	GD	Points
1	Norway	16	123	103	6	14	3532	2725	+807	212
2	Denmark	16	115	76	4	35	3020	2787	+233	156
3	Hungary	16	109	59	5	45	2908	2816	+92	123
4	France	13	92	59	3	30	2331	2118	+213	121
5	Germany	16	102	53	5	44	2596	2557	+39	111
6	Russia	14	94	49	11	34	2480	2284	+196	109
7	Romania	15	100	49	4	47	2519	2530	-11	102
8	Sweden	14	87	39	7	41	2238	2229	+9	85
9	Montenegro	8	53	31	1	21	1345	1334	+11	63
10	Netherlands	10	62	28	2	32	1639	1624	+15	58
11	Spain	13	77	24	10	43	1896	1973	-77	58
12	Croatia	13	63	26	2	34	1505	1632	-127	54
13	Ukraine	12	62	18	7	40	1489	1627	-138	40
14	Serbia	13	60	17	3	40	1604	1731	-127	37
15	Austria	9	50	19	0	31	1202	1327	-125	38
16	Poland	9	43	16	1	29	1017	1161	-144	27
17	Slovenia	9	40	12	0	28	1010	1165	-155	24
18	North Macedonia	7	33	7	3	23	756	934	-178	17
19	Czech Republic	8	37	8	0	29	863	951	-88	16
20	Belarus	4	18	2	5	11	460	509	-49	9
21	Switzerland	2	10	2	1	7	264	326	-62	5
22	Slovakia	3	15	1	1	13	303	427	-124	3
23	Iceland	3	9	1	0	8	196	250	-54	2
24	Faroe Islands	1	3	0	1	2	66	78	-12	1
25	Turkey	1	3	0	1	2	68	102	-34	1
26	Portugal	2	6	0	0	6	128	181	-53	0
27	Lithuania	1	6	0	0	6	124	183	-59	0

=== Total hosts ===
Rank	Nation	Hosts	Year(s)
1	Denmark	6	1996, 2002, 2010, 2020, (2028), (2032)
2	Hungary	3	2004, 2014, 2024
2	Sweden	3	2006, 2016, (2028)
4	France	2	2018, (2030)
4	Germany	2	1994, (2032)
4	North Macedonia	2	2008, 2022
4	Poland	2	(2026), (2032)
4	Romania	2	2000, (2026)
4	Norway	2	2010, (2028)
10	Austria	1	2024
10	Belgium	1	(2030)
10	Croatia	1	2014
10	Czech Republic	1	(2026)
10	Montenegro	1	2022
10	Netherlands	1	1998
10	Serbia	1	2012
10	Slovakia	1	(2026)
10	Slovenia	1	2022
10	Switzerland	1	2024
10	Turkey	1	(2026)

=== Top scorers by tournament ===
The record-holder for scored goals in a single Euro Championship is Bojana Radulović, where she scored 72 goals Hungary at the 2004 European Women's Handball Championship in Hungary.

Year	Player	Goals
1994	(Hungary) Ágnes Farkas	48
1996	(Norway) Kjersti Grini	48
1998	(Austria) Ausra Fridrikas	68
2000	(Romania) Simona Gogîrlă	68
2002	(Hungary) Ágnes Farkas	58
2004	(Hungary) Bojana Radulović	72
2006	(Germany) Nadine Krause	58
2008	(Norway) Linn-Kristin Riegelhuth	51
2010	(Romania) Cristina Neagu	53
2012	(Montenegro) Katarina Bulatović	56
2014	(Sweden) Isabelle Gulldén	58
2016	(Norway) Nora Mørk	53
2018	(Serbia) Katarina Krpež Slezak	50
2020	(Norway) Nora Mørk	52
2022	(Norway) Nora Mørk	50
2024	(Hungary) Katrin Klujber	60

=== Best players by tournament ===
Year	Player
1994	Not awarded
1996	(Denmark) Anja Andersen
1998	(Norway) Trine Haltvik
2000	(Hungary) Beáta Siti
2002	(Denmark) Karin Mortensen
2004	(Norway) Gro Hammerseng
2006	(Norway) Gro Hammerseng
2008	(Norway) Kristine Lunde
2010	(Sweden) Linnea Torstenson
2012	(Norway) Anja Edin
2014	(Sweden) Isabelle Gulldén
2016	(Netherlands) Nycke Groot
2018	(Russia) Anna Vyakhireva
2020	(France) Estelle Nze Minko
2022	(Norway) Henny Reistad
2024	(Denmark) Anna Kristensen

== Participating nations ==
Legend

- 1st – Champions
- 2nd – Runners-up
- 3rd – Third place
- 4th – Fourth place
- 5th – Fifth place
- 6th – Sixth place
- 7th – Seventh place
- 8th – Eighth place
- 9th – Ninth place
- 10th – Tenth place
- 11th – Eleventh place
- 12th – Twelfth place
- 13th to 16th – Thirteenth to sixteenth place
- Q – Qualified for upcoming tournament
- q – may still qualify for upcoming tournament
- • – Did not qualify
- •× – Disqualified
- × – Did not enter / Withdrew / Banned
- – Hosts

For each tournament, the number of teams in each finals tournament (in brackets) are shown.

Nation	(Germany) 1994	(Denmark) 1996	(Netherlands) 1998	(Romania) 2000	(Denmark) 2002	(Hungary) 2004	(Sweden) 2006	(North Macedonia) 2008	(Denmark) (Norway) 2010	(Serbia) 2012	(Croatia) (Hungary) 2014	(Sweden) 2016	(France) 2018	(Denmark) 2020	(North Macedonia) (Montenegro) (Slovenia) 2022	(Austria) (Hungary) (Switzerland) 2024	(Czech Republic) (Poland) (Romania) (Slovakia) (Turkey) 2026	(Denmark) (Norway) (Sweden) 2028	(Belgium) (France) 2030	(Denmark) (Germany) (Poland) 2032	Participations
Austria	9th	3rd	4th	12th	9th	10th	10th	15th	•	•	•	•	•	•	•	14th	Q				10
Belarus	•	•	•	11th	16th	16th	•	12th	•	•	•	•	•	•	×	×	×				4
Belgium	×	×	×	×	×	×	×	×	×	×	×	×	×	×	×	×	•		Q		1
Croatia	5th	6th	•	•	•	13th	7th	6th	9th	13th	13th	16th	16th	3rd	10th	19th	Q				14
Czech Republic	8th	•	•	•	8th	15th	•	•	•	12th	•	10th	15th	15th	•	15th	Q				9
Denmark	1st	1st	2nd	10th	1st	2nd	11th	11th	4th	5th	8th	4th	8th	4th	2nd	2nd	Q	Q		Q	18
Faroe Islands	×	×	×	×	×	×	×	×	×	×	×	•	•	•	•	17th	Q				2
France	•	•	•	5th	3rd	11th	3rd	14th	5th	9th	5th	3rd	1st	2nd	4th	4th	Q		Q		14
Germany	2nd	4th	6th	9th	11th	5th	4th	4th	13th	7th	10th	6th	10th	7th	7th	7th	Q			Q	17
Greece	•	•	•	•	•	•	•	•	•	•	•	•	•	•	•	•	Q				1
Hungary	4th	10th	3rd	1st	5th	3rd	5th	8th	10th	3rd	6th	12th	7th	10th	11th	3rd	Q				17
Iceland	•	•	•	•	•	•	•	•	15th	15th	•	•	•	•	•	16th	Q				4
Lithuania	•	12th	•	•	•	•	•	•	•	•	•	•	•	•	•	•	•				1
Montenegro^{1}							•	•	6th	1st	4th	13th	9th	8th	3rd	8th	Q				9
Netherlands	•	•	10th	•	14th	•	15th	•	8th	•	7th	2nd	3rd	6th	6th	6th	Q				11
North Macedonia	×	×	8th	8th	•	•	12th	7th	•	16th	•	•	•	•	16th	18th	Q				8
Norway	3rd	2nd	1st	6th	2nd	1st	1st	1st	1st	2nd	1st	1st	5th	1st	1st	1st	Q	Q			18
Poland	•	11th	5th	•	•	•	8th	•	•	•	11th	15th	14th	14th	13th	9th	Q			Q	10
Portugal	•	•	•	•	•	•	•	16th	•	•	•	•	•	•	•	22nd	•				2
Romania	10th	5th	11th	4th	7th	7th	•	5th	3rd	10th	9th	5th	4th	12th	12th	11th	Q				16
Russia	6th	7th	9th	3rd	4th	4th	2nd	3rd	7th	6th	14th	7th	2nd	5th	×	×	×				14
Serbia^{1}							14th	13th	14th	4th	15th	9th	11th	13th	15th	21st	Q				11
Slovakia	12th	•	•	•	•	•	•	•	•	•	12th	•	•	•	•	24th	Q				4
Slovenia	•	•	•	•	10th	9th	16th	•	16th	•	•	14th	13th	16th	8th	10th	Q				10
Spain	•	•	12th	•	13th	8th	9th	2nd	11th	11th	2nd	11th	12th	9th	9th	13th	Q				14
Sweden	7th	8th	•	•	15th	14th	6th	9th	2nd	8th	3rd	8th	6th	11th	5th	5th	Q	Q			16
Switzerland	•	•	•	•	•	•	•	•	•	•	•	•	•	•	14th	12th	Q				3
Turkey	•	•	•	•	•	•	•	•	•	•	•	•	•	•	•	20th	Q				2
Ukraine	11th	9th	7th	2nd	12th	6th	13th	10th	12th	14th	16th	•	•	•	•	23rd	Q				13
Historical national teams
Serbia and Montenegro^{1}						12th															1
FR Yugoslavia^{1}	×	•	•	7th	6th																2
Total	12	12	12	12	16	16	16	16	16	16	16	16	16	16	16	24	24	24	24	24	

^{1} FR Yugoslavia competed as such until 2003 when the FRY was reconstituted as a State Union Serbia and Montenegro. Since the dissolution of the union in 2006, national teams exist for both countries.

== Most successful players ==
Boldface denotes active handball players and highest medal count among all players (including these who not included in these tables) per type.

Rank	Player	Country	From	To	Gold	Silver	Bronze	Total
1	**Katrine Lunde**	Norway	2002	2024	**7**	2	–	**9**
2	Camilla Herrem	Norway	2008	2024	6	1	–	7
3	Karoline Dyhre Breivang	Norway	2004	2014	5	1	–	6
3	Marit Malm Frafjord	Norway	2006	2020	5	1	–	6
3	Stine Oftedal Dahmke	Norway	2010	2022	5	1	–	6
3	Linn-Kristin Riegelhuth Koren	Norway	2004	2014	5	1	–	6
3	**Silje Solberg-Østhassel**	Norway	2012	2024	5	1	–	6
3	Tonje Larsen	Norway	1994	2010	3	2	1	6
9	Kari Aalvik Grimsbø	Norway	2006	2016	5	–	–	5
9	**Nora Mørk**	Norway	2010	2022	5	–	–	5
9	Heidi Løke	Norway	2008	2020	4	1	–	5

== See also ==
- Women's EHF Euro Cup
