= Lív Sveinbjørnsdóttir Poulsen =

Faroese handball player (born 2001)

Lív Poulsen
Personal information
- Full name: Lív Sveinbjørnsdóttir Poulsen
- Nationality: Faroese
- Born: 27 December 2001 (age 24) Vestmanna, Faroe Islands
- Height: 1.73 m (5 ft 8 in)

Sport
- Sport: Handball
- Position: Right back/wing
- Current club: EH Aalborg
- Number: 3

Youth career
- Years: Team
- 2017–2021: Herning-Ikast Håndbold

Senior clubs
- Years: Team
- 2018–2021: Herning-Ikast Håndbold
- 2021–2023: Ajax København
- 2023–2024: TMS Ringsted
- 2024–: EH Aalborg
National team
Years	Team	Apps	(Gls)
2019–	Faroe Islands	33	(66)
- Updated on 27 November 2025

Lív Sveinbjørnsdóttir Poulsen (born 27 December 2001) is a Faroese handballer who plays for EH Aalborg in the Danish Women's Handball League and the Faroe Islands women's national team.

She made her debut on the senior team of Herning-Ikast Håndbold, on 30 January 2019. On 20 March 2021, it was announced that Poulsen had signed a 1-year contract with Ajax København.

She made her debut on the Faroese national team on 29 September 2019, against Poland. Her first major international tournament was the 2024 European Women's Handball Championship, which was also the first ever major international tournament for Faroes Islands ever. At the 2025 World Championship she was part of the Faroe Islands team that played for the first time at a World Championship. With wins over Spain and Paraguay they advanced from the preliminary groups and recorded their first ever win at a major international tournament.

== Personal life ==
Is in a relationship with Norwegian international handballer Tobias Grøndahl.

== Achievements ==
- Danish Championship:
  - Runners-up: 2019,
  - Bronze: 2021
- Danish Cup:
  - Winner: 2019
