= Belgium women's national handball team =

Women's Team

Belgium

Information
- Nickname: The Black Arrows
- Association: Royal Belgian Handball Federation (URBH)

Colours
1st	2nd

Results

Summer Olympics
- Appearances: 0

World Championship
- Appearances: 0

European Championship
- Appearances: 1 (First in 2030)
- Last updated on 15 June 2026.

The Belgium women's national handball team is the national team of Belgium. It is governed by the Royal Belgian Handball Federation and takes part in international handball competitions. It never participated in major international tournaments, however they will make their debut at the European Championship in 2030 as co-host, marking the first time Belgium will participate in a EHF EURO in any gender.

== Competitive record ==
=== Olympic Games ===
Year	Position	GP	W	D	L	GS	GA	GD
(Canada) 1976	Did not qualify							
(Soviet Union) 1980	Did not qualify							
(United States) 1984	Did not qualify							
(South Korea) 1988	Did not qualify							
(Spain) 1992	Did not qualify							
(United States) 1996	Did not qualify							
(Australia) 2000	Did not qualify							
(Greece) 2004	Did not qualify							
(China) 2008	Did not qualify							
(United Kingdom) 2012	Did not qualify							
(Brazil) 2016	Did not qualify							
(Japan) 2020	Did not qualify							
(France) 2024	Did not qualify							
(United States) 2028	TBD							
(Australia) 2032	TBD							
Total	0/15	0	0	0	0	0	0	0

=== World Championship ===
Year	Position	GP	W	D	L	GS	GA	GD
(Socialist Federal Republic of Yugoslavia) 1957	Did not qualify							
(Romania) 1962	Did not qualify							
(West Germany) 1965	Did not qualify							
(Netherlands) 1971	Did not qualify							
(Socialist Federal Republic of Yugoslavia) 1973	Did not qualify							
(Soviet Union) 1975	Did not qualify							
(Czechoslovakia) 1978	Did not qualify							
(Hungary) 1982	Did not qualify							
(Netherlands) 1986	Did not qualify							
(South Korea) 1990	Did not qualify							
(Norway) 1993	Did not qualify							
(Hungary) 1995	Did not qualify							
(Germany) 1997	Did not qualify							
(Norway) 1999	Did not qualify							
(Italy) 2001	Did not qualify							
(Croatia) 2003	Did not qualify							
(Russia) 2005	Did not qualify							
(France) 2007	Did not qualify							
(China) 2009	Did not qualify							
(Brazil) 2011	Did not qualify							
(Serbia) 2013	Did not qualify							
(Denmark) 2015	Did not qualify							
(Germany) 2017	Did not qualify							
(Japan) 2019	Did not qualify							
(Spain) 2021	Did not qualify							
(Denmark) (Norway) (Sweden) 2023	Did not qualify							
(Germany) (Netherlands) 2025	Did not qualify							
(Hungary) 2027	Did not qualify							
(Spain) 2029	TBD							
(Czech Republic) (Poland) 2031	TBD							
Total	0/30	0	0	0	0	0	0	0

=== European Championship ===
Year	Position	GP	W	D	L	GS	GA	GD
(Germany) 1994	Did not qualify							
(Denmark) 1996	Did not qualify							
(Netherlands) 1998	Did not qualify							
(Romania) 2000	Did not qualify							
(Denmark) 2002	Did not qualify							
(Hungary) 2004	Did not qualify							
(Sweden) 2006	Did not qualify							
(North Macedonia) 2008	Did not qualify							
(Denmark) (Norway) 2010	Did not qualify							
(Serbia) 2012	Did not qualify							
(Hungary) (Croatia) 2014	Did not qualify							
(Sweden) 2016	Did not qualify							
(France) 2018	Did not qualify							
(Denmark) (Norway) 2020	Did not qualify							
(Slovenia) (North Macedonia) (Montenegro) 2022	Did not qualify							
(Austria) (Hungary) (Switzerland) 2024	Did not qualify							
(Czech Republic) (Poland) (Romania) (Slovakia) (Turkey) 2026	Did not qualify							
(Denmark) (Norway) (Sweden) 2028	TBD							
(Belgium) (France) 2030	Qualified as co-host							
(Denmark) (Germany) (Poland) 2032	TBD							
Total	1/20	0	0	0	0	0	0	0
