= 2027 World Women's Handball Championship =

2027 edition of the World Women's Handball Championship

2027-es női kézilabda-világbajnokság

Tournament details
- Host country: Hungary
- Dates: 30 November – 19 December
- Teams: 32 (from 5 confederations)

The 2027 World Women's Handball Championship, the 28th event hosted by the International Handball Federation, will be held in Hungary from 30 November to 19 December 2027. It will be the main qualifying event for the women's handball tournament of the 2028 Summer Olympics.

== Venues ==
Following is a list of all venues and host cities which were used.

Hungary
Budapest	Debrecen	Győr	Tatabánya
MVM Dome	Főnix Arena	Audi Aréna Győr	Tatabánya Multifunctional Sport Hall
Capacity: 20,022	Capacity: 6,500	Capacity: 5,500	Capacity: 6,000
Location of venues in Hungary

It was announced that the final round would certainly be in Budapest. The bid includes the following four host cities/venues:

== Qualification ==
Competition	Dates	Host	Vacancies	Qualified
Host nation	28 February 2020	(Egypt) Cairo	1	Hungary
2025 World Championship	14 December 2025	Germany; Netherlands	1	Norway
2026 European Championship	3–20 December 2026	Czech Republic; Poland; Romania; Slovakia; Turkey	4 + ?	
European qualification	21 October 2026 – 2027		4 + ?	
2026 Asian Championship	23 November – 3 December 2026	(Kazakhstan) Almaty	4 + ?	
2026 African Championship	2–12 December 2026	Tunisia	4 + ?	
2026 South and Central American Championship	7–12 December 2026	(Brazil) Mariana	3 + ?	
2027 Nor.Ca. Women's Championship			1 + ?	
Wild card	18 October 2018	(Qatar) Doha	1 or 2^{[1]}^{[2]}	

1. To bear in mind the 2028 Summer Olympics, the IHF Council will award the United States wild cards for the 2025 and 2027 World Championships, if they reach a certain performance level.

2. If countries from Oceania (Australia or New Zealand) participating in the Asian Championships finish within the top 5, they will qualify for the World Championships. If either finishes sixth or lower, the place would have been transferred to the wild card spot.

== Qualified teams ==
Team	Qualification method	Date of qualification	Appearance(s)				Previous best performance (Note: Bold text indicates they hosted that edition.)
Team	Qualification method	Date of qualification	Total	First	Last	Streak	Previous best performance
Hungary	Host	28 February 2020	26th	1957	2025	8	**Champions** (1965)
Norway	Defending champions	14 December 2025	24th	1971	2025	21	**Champions** (**1999**, 2011, 2015, 2021, 2025)
