= 2030 European Women's Handball Championship =

2030 EHF European Women's Handball Championship
Tournament details
- Host countries: Belgium; France
- Dates: 28 November –15 December
- Teams: 24 (from 1 confederation)

The 2030 EHF European Women's Handball Championship, commonly referred to as the EHF EURO 2030, will be the 19th edition of the EHF European Women's Handball Championship, the biennial international women's handball championship of Europe organized by EHF. The tournament will be held in Belgium and France from 28 November to 15 December 2030.

== Bids ==
=== First bidding process ===
On 3 November 2023, it was originally announced that the following nations sent in an official expression of interest:

- Turkey

However on 16: December 2024, the bid process reopened after Turkey failed to meet the requirements

=== Second bidding process ===
The second bid process reopened in 2025, leaving one joint bid who submitted its candidature.

- Belgium / France

On 15 June 2026 during the EHF Executive Committee in Cologne, Belgium and France were awarded as co-hosts. This marks the second time France will host the tournament after the 2018 edition. This also marks the first time Belgium will host an EHF EURO in any gender.

== Qualified teams ==
Country	Qualified as	Qualified on	Previous appearances in tournament
Belgium	Co-host	13 June 2026	0 (debut)
France	Co-host	13 June 2026	14 (2000, 2002, 2004, 2006, 2008, 2010, 2012, 2014, 2016, **2018**, 2020, 2022, 2024, 2026)

Note: Bold indicates champion for that year. Italic indicates host for that year.

== Venues ==
Dunkirk, Nantes and Paris will serve as the French venues, Antwerp will be the Belgian part of the tournament. Switzerland is possible to be the third host country with Zug as its host city.
