= 2028 European Women's Handball Championship =

2028 EHF European Women's Handball Championship
Tournament details
- Host countries: Denmark; Norway; Sweden
- Venues: 9 (in 9 host cities)
- Dates: 30 November – 17 December
- Teams: 24 (from 1 confederation)

The 2028 EHF European Women's Handball Championship, commonly referred to as the EHF EURO 2028, will be the 18th edition of the EHF European Women's Handball Championship, the biennial international women's handball championship of Europe organized by the EHF. It will be co-hosted by Denmark, Norway and Sweden from 30 November to 17 December 2028.

== Bid process ==
=== Bids ===
On 11 May 2021 it was announced that the following nations sent in an official expression of interest:

- Denmark, Norway & Sweden

=== Host selection ===
As only the Scandinavian bid remained it was unanimously selected at the 14th EHF Extraordinary Congress on 20 November 2021.

== Qualified teams ==
| Country | Qualified as | Date qualification was secured | Previous appearances in tournament^{1} |
|---|---|---|---|
| Denmark | Co-hosts | 20 November 2021 | 16 (**1994**, **1996**, 1998, 2000, **2002**, 2004, 2006, 2008, 2010, 2012, 2014, 2016, 2018, 2020, 2022, 2024) |
| Norway | Co-hosts | 20 November 2021 | 16 (1994, 1996, **1998**, 2000, 2002, **2004**, **2006**, **2008**, **2010**, 2012, **2014**, **2016**, 2018, **2020**, **2022**, **2024**) |
| Sweden | Co-hosts | 20 November 2021 | 14 (1994, 1996, 2002, 2004, 2006, 2008, 2010, 2012, 2014, 2016, 2018, 2020, 2022, 2024) |

^{1} Bold indicates champion for that year. Italic indicates host for that year.

== Venues ==
In Sweden, the venues are Gothenburg and Kristianstad after the latter replaced Helsingborg in November 2025.

In Norway, the venues are in Oslo and Trondheim. The final will be held in the modern Trondheim Spektrum. Trondheim approved for the final
