= 2026 European Women's Handball Championship bidding process =

The 2026 European Women's Handball Championship bidding process entails the bids for the 2026 European Women's Handball Championship. The winners were originally Russia but it was taken away from them due to their invasion of Ukraine. The eventual winners were Czech Republic, Poland, Romania, Slovakia and Turkey.

== Bidding timeline ==
The bidding timeline is as follows:

- 4 June 2020: Invitation to National Federations to provide a letter of intent to the EHF for hosting the EHF EUROs 2026 & 2028
- 1 October 2020: Deadline for submitting the letter of intent and request for the bidding documents by the interested federations
- 1 November 2020: Dispatch of the manual for staging the EHF EUROs 2026 & 2028 together with the relevant specifications and forms by the EHF
- 1 May 2021: Applications available at the EHF Office
- May/June 2021: Evaluation of bids by the EHF
- June 2021: Approval of applications by EHF EXEC
- June–September 2021: Site inspections
- September 2021: Further evaluation after inspections
- September 2021: Confirmation of bids for the EHF EUROs 2026 & 2028
- 17/18 November 2021: Allocation at the EO EHF Congress 2021

== Bids ==
On 11 May 2021 it was announced that the following nations sent in an official expression of interest:

- Russia
- Denmark, Norway & Sweden (withdrew)

On 20 October the final bids were presented. The Scandinavian bid was withdrawn, leaving Russia unopposed.

- Russia

=== Russia ===
Russia arena map

In September 2020, Russian federation president, Sergey Shishkarev, said he was discussing the bid with the European Handball Federation. In October 2020, Russia's name was on list of interested nations in the tournament.

When the deadline for official bids ended, Russia was on the list, under the slogan We Can. However, they made numerous changes to their bid compared to 2024, as Rostov-on-Don, Krasnodar and Astrakhan were all axed from the bid. In an interview with the development director of the Russian Handball Federation, Olga Bugaenko, she confirmed that all three were taken out to reduce the number of cities involved and that it is much easier for foreign fans to travel to Moscow and Saint Petersburg. Specifically on Rostov-on-Don, Bugaenko said the uncertainty surrounding their arena was the main reason for leaving the city out.

The main round groups would be held in the Sibur Arena and VTB Arena, with the final weekend in Moscow at the VTB Arena. The Irina Viner-Usmanova Gymnastics Palace in Moscow was the only arena that did not meet the EHF's requirements and thus was axed.

These were the proposed venues in Russia's bid:

Moscow	Saint Petersburg	Saint Petersburg
VTB Arena; Capacity: 12,000	Yubileyny Sports Palace; Capacity: 6,500	Sibur Arena; Capacity: 6,000

Venue which was originally included, but taken out:

- Moscow – Irina Viner-Usmanova Gymnastics Palace, capacity 3,500

=== Denmark, Norway and Sweden ===
Denmark, Norway, and Sweden arena map

Having first stating an interest as two separate bids (Denmark and Norway and a Swedish solo bid) the Scandinavians decided to all bid for an EHF Euro together for the first time ever for EHF Euro, under the slogan Scandinavia Connect. Their bids' aim is to use innovation and modern-day technologies to help Handball have a bright future.

The Swedish Handball Federation president, Frederik Rapp, stated “the commitment to finding sustainable solutions across all industries and areas of life is very clear in all of Scandinavia. To connect the Scandinavian approach and experience in sustainability with European handball is so valuable. Finding more sustainable solutions for future events could be a real game-changer for the future of our sport”.

While the Danish counterpart, Per Bertelsen said “We believe we can build on the positive momentum we see in our sport. Together, we can deliver a world-class event that will be a true celebration for European handball”.

The main round would be held in Oslo or Trondheim in Norway and either Copenhagen or Herning in Denmark. The final weekend would be in the Telenor Arena in Oslo, marking the first time Norway has hosted the final of the EHF Women's Euro (they were going to host the final in 2020, but withdrew altogether due to COVID-19). Every other venue would host preliminary round matches.

However, they withdrew their 2026 bid to focus on their 2028 application, and ended up winning the hosting rights for 2028 unopposed.

These are the following 9 venues included in the Scandinavian bid:

Denmark

- Herning – Jyske Bank Boxen, capacity 15,000
- Copenhagen – Royal Arena, capacity 13.000
- Aarhus – Ceres Arena, capacity 5,000

Norway

- Oslo – Telenor Arena, capacity 15,000
- Bergen – Byarena, capacity 12,000
- Trondheim – Trondheim Spektrum, capacity 9,000
- Stavanger – DNB Arena, capacity 5,000

Sweden

- Gothenburg – Scandinavium, capacity 10,000
- Helsingborg – Helsingborg Arena, capacity 5,000

Venue that was deemed not suitable for tournament and is no longer part of the bid:

- Kolding – Sydbank Arena, capacity 5,100

=== Host selection ===
As only the Russian bid remained it was unanimously selected at the 14th EHF Extraordinary Congress on 20 November 2021. Sergey Shishkarev called the awarding of the hosting rights as a historic moment.

=== Withdrawal ===
After the war in Ukraine started, the EHF said they would monitor the situation. But on 4 July 2023, the championships were taken away from Russia. After the statement, Shishkarev said they would pursue future IHF World Women's Handball Championships and EHF Euros.

== Second bidding process ==
After it was decided that Russia would not host the event, the EHF reopened the bidding process.

=== New bidding timeline ===
The new timeline is:

- 25 October 2023: Deadline for submitting the full bids by the interested federations
- November–December 2023: Evaluation of bids by the EHF and site inspections
- 27 January 2024: Allocation at the EHF EXEC meeting

On 25 August 2023, the EHF announced the new bids.

- Czech Republic and Poland
- Romania
- Spain
- Turkey

On 25 October, the EHF announced the official bids. Spain withdrew their application, while Slovakia joined Romania's bid.

- Czech Republic and Poland
- Romania and Slovakia
- Turkey

=== Czech Republic and Poland ===
Poland arena map
Czech Republic arena map

Czech Republic and Poland confirmed a joint letter of interest to bid. Speaking after this announcement, Czech Handball president, Ondřej Zdráhala, noted that Poland was an experienced and reliable partner and also said that Spain is their biggest rival in the bidding process. Czech Republic and Poland submitted an official joint bid for the event with the slogan Follow the way. Polish federation president, Henryk Szczepański, saying:

"We are delighted to be bidding for the right to host the EHF EURO 2026 together with our partners from the Czech Handball Federation. Behind us is an intensive period of work on the preparation of a joint offer, numerous meetings and arrangements at the international, central and local government levels. Poland and the Czech Republic are connected not only by their close proximity, but also by their passion for handball. I strongly believe that this will be the beginning of our joint projects".

While the Czech counterpart, Ondřej Zdráhala, said:

"We want to offer our fans, who have always been fantastic, another range of emotions, top events are the pinnacle of handball. I believe that we have done our best in the organisational preparations and we will look forward to the decision".

In regards to venues, Ondřej Zdráhala had originally stated that the idea was to have Katowice, Ostrava and Wrocław as host cities. However, when the EHF announced the official bids, the venues changed to Brno, Lubin and Katowice. The preliminary round would be held Brno, Lubin and Katowice, the main round in Brno and Katowice, and the final weekend in Katowice.

These are the proposed venues for the bid:

Czech Republic

- Brno – Arena Brno, capacity 12,000

Poland

- Katowice – Spodek, capacity 11,036
- Lubin – Hala Widowiskowo Sportowa RCS Lubin, capacity 5,000

=== Romania and Slovakia ===
Romania arena map
Slovakia arena map

After starting off as a solo bid, Romania teamed up with Slovakia for a joint bid after negociations with the Slovaks went successfully. Prior, it was rumoured that Romania would be given the hosting rights automatically, although this never materialised. The final weekend would be in Cluj-Napoca.

However, shortly after they announced proposed facilities, the EHF told Romania that the arenas in Pitești and Bistrita were too small and did not meet the requirements. While at the same time, the EHF reacted favourably to adding the Oradea Arena in Oradea instead.

Another issue aroused when the arena in Bucharest was considered too old and did not meet requirements.

These are the proposed venues:

Romania

- Cluj-Napoca – BTarena, capacity 10,000
- Bucharest – Polyvalent Hall, capacity 5,300
- Oradea – Oradea Arena, capacity 5,500
- Craiova – Polyvalent Hall, capacity 4,215

Slovakia

- Bratislava – Ondrej Nepela Arena, capacity 10,000
- Košice – Steel Aréna, capacity 7,900

Venues that were axed, having originally been included:

- Pitești – Pitești Arena, capacity 4,900
- Bistrita – TeraPlast Arena, capacity 3,007

=== Turkey ===
Turkey arena map

Turkey filed an application for the first time since 2016. The final weekend would take place in the Sinan Erdem Dome in Istanbul.

These are the venues for the Turkish bid:

- Istanbul – Sinan Erdem Dome, capacity 16,000
- Ankara – Ankara Arena, capacity 10,400
- Antalya – Antalya Arena, capacity 10,000

== Host selection ==
=== Original host announcement ===
The hosts were originally going to be announced on 28 January 2024 in Cologne, but the EHF decided to delay the announcement to April while also inviting every bidding nation to a meeting in mid-February.

=== Potential alternative hosting plan ===
During the meeting in mid-February, Romanian media reported that a possible five-country co-hosting plan was being negotiated by all five bidding countries and the EHF after it was reported that none of the three bids fulfilled all the requirements. The reported plan entails that each nation would host one preliminary round group, with the exception of Romania who would host two, the main round would be held in Poland and Romania, while the Poles are considered the favourites to host the final weekend as they have the biggest arena.

=== Host announcement ===
On 8 March 2024, the EHF announced all five countries, Czech Republic, Poland, Romania, Slovakia and Turkey, as co-hosts. This marks the second time a sports tournament has been held in more than four countries, after UEFA Euro 2020.

=== Hosts facts ===
- This is the first time that Czech Republic, Poland, Slovakia and Turkey will host a women's handball tournament.
- The first time that Czech Republic is hosting a senior handball event as an independent nation.
- This is Poland's first time hosting a senior women's handball championship.
- Romania will host a senior handball competition for the first time since the 2000 European Women's Handball Championship.
- After co-hosting the 2022 European Men's Handball Championship, Slovakia will host a senior women's tournament for the first time.
- The first time ever that Turkey hosts a handball competition.

==== Proposed venues ====
- (Czech Republic) Brno – Arena Brno, capacity 12,000
- (Poland) Katowice – Spodek, capacity 11,036
- (Romania) Cluj-Napoca – BTarena, capacity 10,000
- (Romania) Oradea – Oradea Arena, capacity 5,500
- (Slovakia) Bratislava – Ondrej Nepela Arena, capacity 10,000
- (Turkey) Antalya – Antalya Arena, capacity 10,000
