= O2 Arena (Prague) =

Multi-purpose arena in Czechia

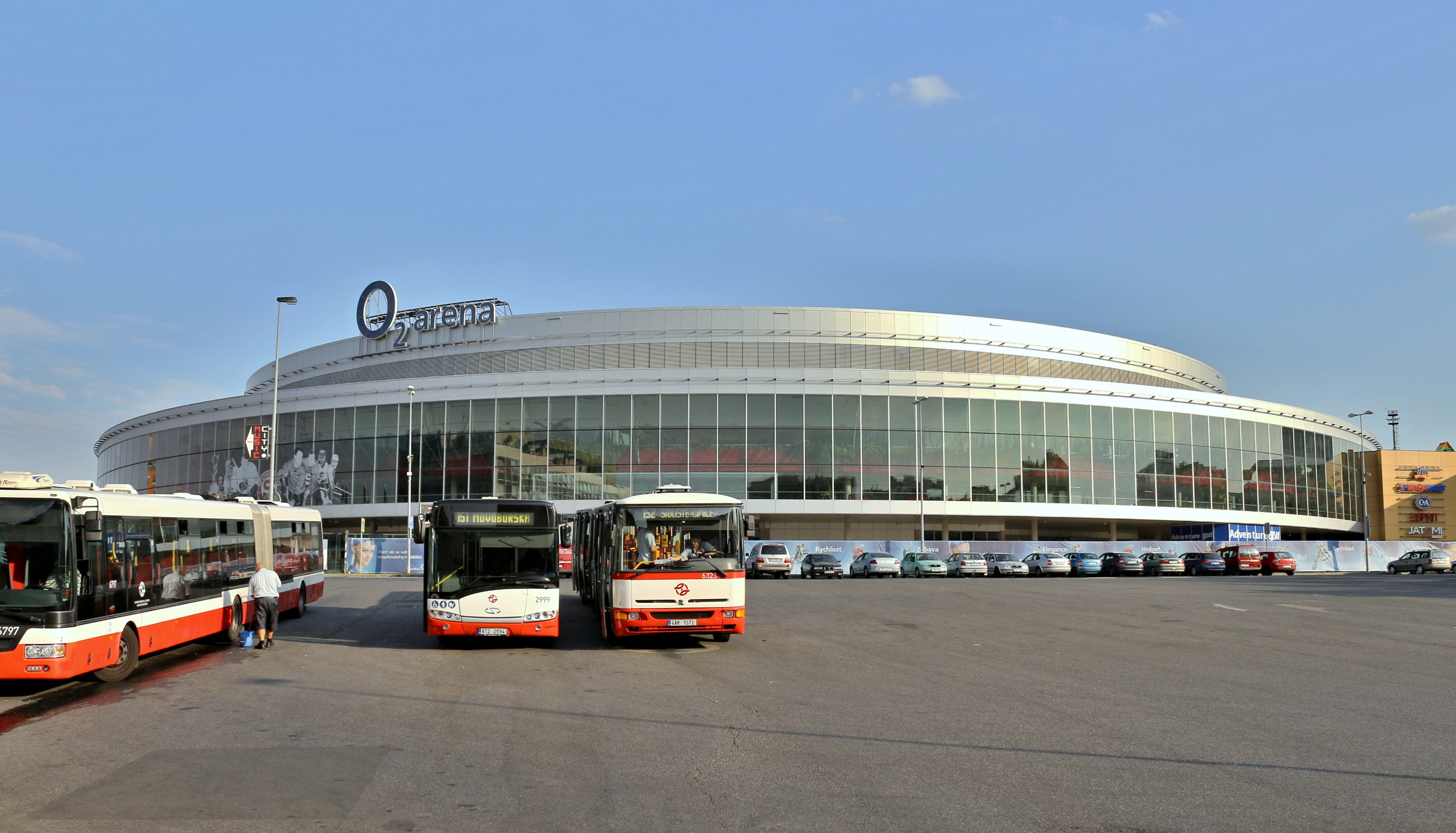
- O2 Arena in July 2018
- Interactive map of O2 Arena
- Former names: Sazka Arena (2004 – March 2008)
- Location: Ocelářská 460/2, 190 00 Prague 9 – Libeň, Czech Republic
- Coordinates: 50°6′17.14″N 14°29′36.59″E
- Operator: BESTSPORT akciová společnost
- Capacity: Concerts: 20,000; Ice hockey: 17,383; Basketball: 16,805; Tennis: 14,000

Construction
- Groundbreaking: September 2002
- Built: 2004
- Opened: 27 March 2004
- Cost: 17 billion CZK € 630 Million
- Architects: ATIP, a.s. – Vladimír Vokatý, Martin Vokatý, Jiří Vít

Tenants
- Czech Republic men's national ice hockey team (2004-present); HC Slavia Praha (Czech Extraliga) (2004–2015); HC Sparta Praha (Czech Extraliga) (2015–present); HC Kladno (Czech Extraliga) (3 games) (2012); HC Lev Praha (KHL) (occasional games) (2012–2014)

O2 Arena (stylised as O_{2} arena) is a multi-purpose arena, in Prague, Czech Republic.

It is home to HC Sparta Prague of the Czech Extraliga and is the third-largest ice hockey arena in Europe. It has hosted important sport events such as three Ice Hockey World Championships (2004, 2015 and 2024), the first edition of the prestigious tennis Laver Cup, the European Athletics Indoor Championships, the Euroleague Final Four 2006, the World Floorball Championship, the 2012 Davis Cup finals, four Fed Cup finals, as well as a handful of NHL and KHL games, including a 2014 Gagarin Cup final.

It also hosts stage shows, such as concerts, and other large-scale events. The highest arena capacity reached was 20,208 people.

== History ==
The idea of building a new arena in Prague came on the heels of the "golden era" of Czech ice hockey: winning the gold medal at the 1998 Winter Olympics and three gold medals in a row at the Ice Hockey World Championships from 1999 to 2001. The arena's main backer then became Sazka a.s., a Czech betting company.

The construction of the arena (which began in September 2002) was not without issues, but it was opened in March 2004 as Sazka Arena, in time to host the 2004 Men's World Ice Hockey Championships. In March 2008, the building was renamed O2 Arena.

In March 2011, Sazka filed for insolvency due to debts from building the arena and other problems. Sazka was then re-organized and financially stabilized.

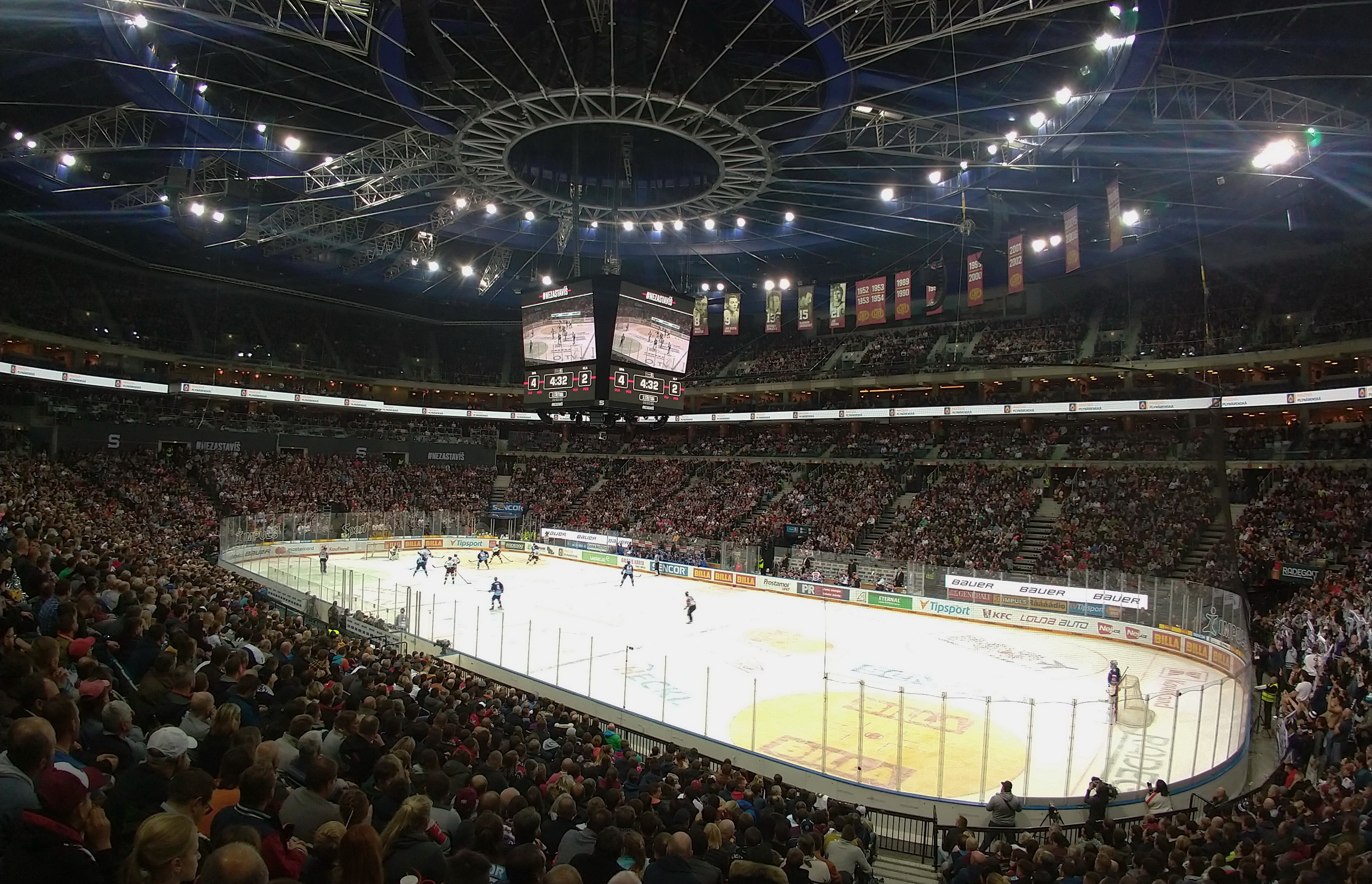
Czech Extraliga match, Sparta Praha vs Rytíři Kladno

From its opening until 2015, it was home to HC Slavia Prague of the Czech Extraliga. Slavia won the national championship on home ice in Game 7 of the 2008 Extraliga finals against HC Karlovy Vary 4–0 in front of a then-league-record crowd of 17,117. For two seasons, 2012–13 and 2013–14, O2 Arena also hosted occasional home games of HC Lev Prague of the Kontinental Hockey League. The club played its home games of the 2014 Gagarin Cup Finals at O2 Arena, attracting the three largest crowds in league history. In 2015, Slavia was relegated to the 1.liga, and the club chose to move back to the smaller Zimní stadion Eden, the team's former home and current training centre. In its place, O2 Arena reached an agreement with cross-town rivals Sparta Prague on 24 June 2015. Sparta ownership cited the need for significant renovations at Tipsport Arena as the main reason for the move.

In 2015, O2 Arena co-hosted the IIHF World Championship with ČEZ Aréna in Ostrava for the second time. This time, the tournament re-established the record for World Championship attendance, which stood until being surpassed in 2024 with the tournament held in the same two cities.

In 2017, it hosted the 1st edition of Laver Cup international indoor hard court men's tennis tournament between Europe and Team World.

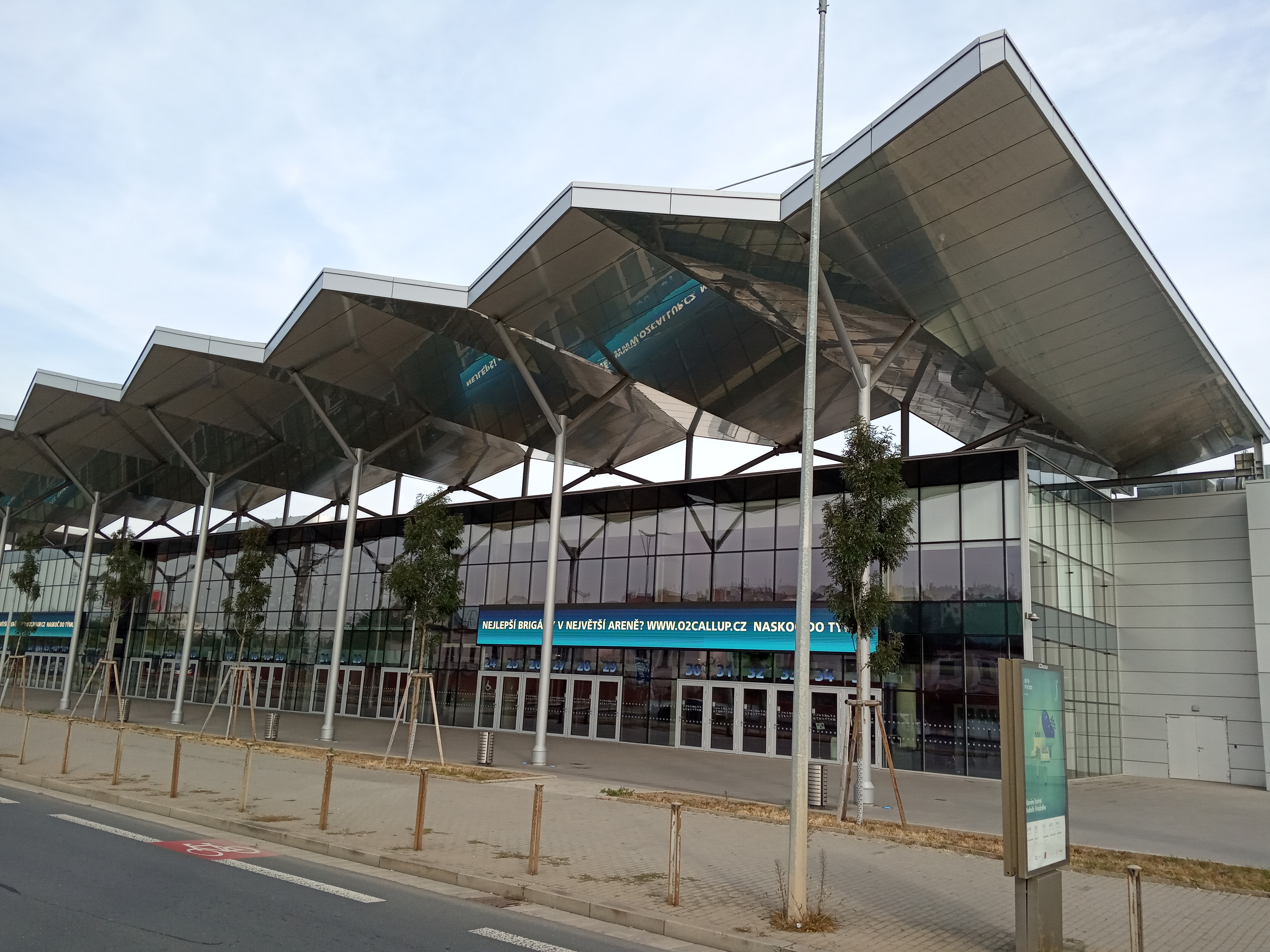
In 2019, a multifunctional congress centre, O_{2} universum, opened up next to the Arena.

In 2019, a multifunctional congress centre, O_{2} universum, opened up next to the Arena.

In 2021, the venue was scheduled to host some group phase matches at the FIBA EuroBasket 2021, which the country was to cohost with Georgia in Tbilisi, Germany in Berlin/Cologne and Italy in Milan. The event was canceled.

In 2021, the Stages Hotel with capacity of around 600 people, opened right next to the Arena. This included a creation of a big pedestrian zone and renewed public space around the eastern entrances to the arena.

On 16 March 2026, the NHL announced that O2 Arena would be one of three host arenas for the 2028 World Cup of Hockey, along with Rogers Place in Edmonton and Scotia Place in Calgary.

== Notable events ==
=== Music ===
- On 6 and 7 September 2006 Madonna performed there during her Confessions Tour. The concert was attended by 18,628 spectators, the biggest number of spectators in the arena's history. She performed again at the arena on 7 & 8 November 2015 as part of her Rebel Heart Tour selling out crowds of over 16,000 patrons.
- The arena is the home of the Transmission festival since 2007.
- On 12 June 2007, Linkin Park performed at the venue as part of the Minutes to Midnight World Tour.
- On 12 May 2008, Kylie Minogue performed there as part of her KylieX2008. She performed again at the arena on 2 March 2011 as part of her Aphrodite World Tour. On 21 October 2014 Minogue performed again as part of her Kiss Me Once Tour.
- On 26 June 2008 Céline Dion performed there during Taking Chances World Tour.
- In November 2008, the French electronica pioneer Jean Michel Jarre performed his Oxygène album live at the arena, as part of the second leg of the Oxygène 30th anniversary tour.
- On 27 April 2009, Tina Turner performed a concert as part of the Tina!: 50th Anniversary Tour
- Sting performed during his Symphonicities Tour on 22 September 2010, along with the Royal Philharmonic Orchestra.
- On November 17, 2010, Lady Gaga a concert as part of the Monster Ball Tour.
- On 7 December 2011, Rihanna performed there during her Loud Tour. On 27 July 2016, Rihanna performed there as part of Anti World Tour.
- On 26 October 2012, Jennifer Lopez performed a sold-out show during her Dance Again World Tour.
- On October 5, 2014, Lady Gaga performed a concert as part of the ArtRave: The Artpop Ball.
- On 17 February 2015, Queen + Adam Lambert performed there as part of their Queen + Adam Lambert Tour 2014-2015. The group returned to the arena on November 1, 2017, to kick off their 2017 European tour.
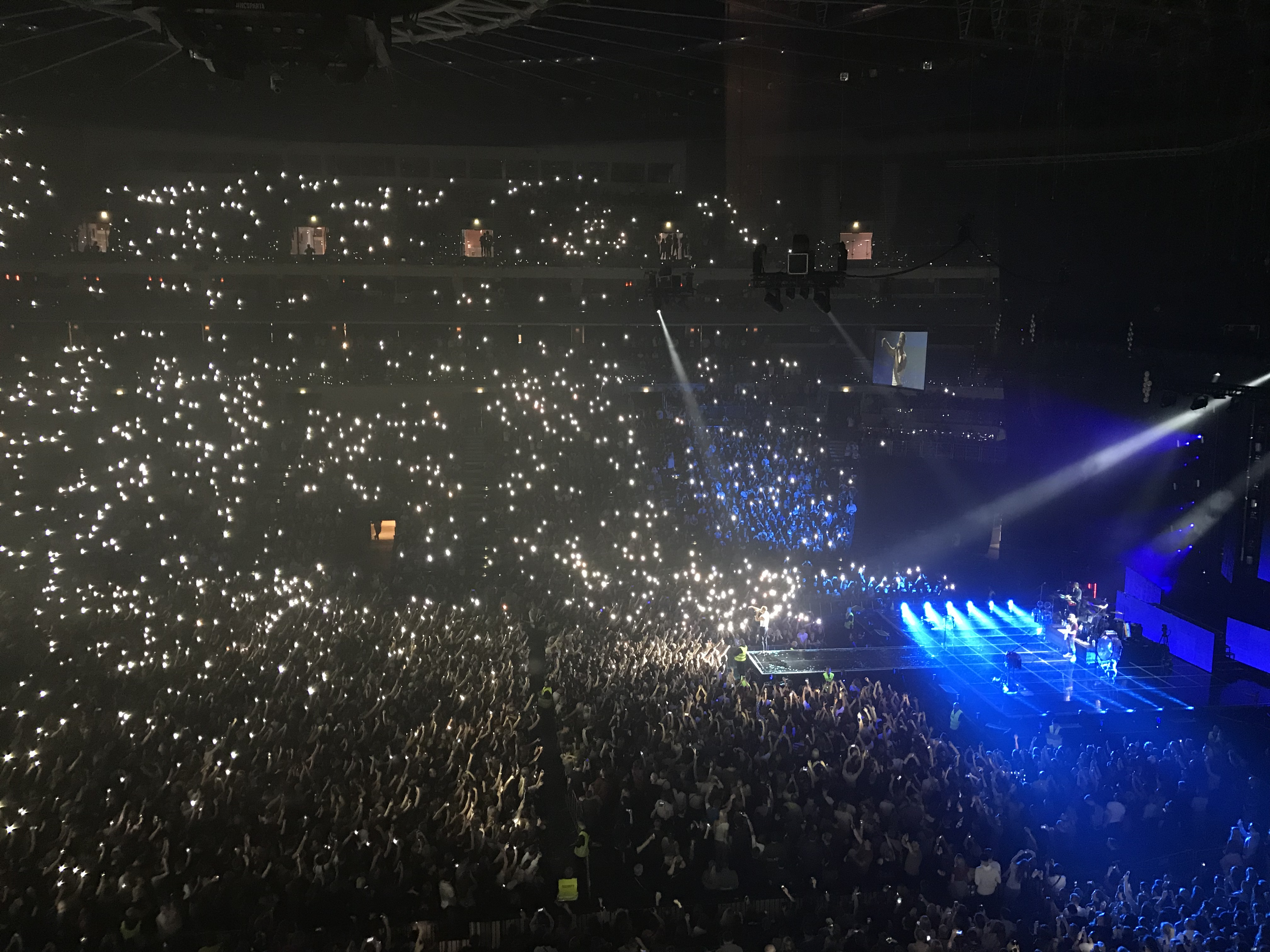
  Imagine Dragons concert in 2018
- On 23 February 2015, Katy Perry performed there as part of Prismatic World Tour.
- On January 30, 2016, Ellie Goulding performed there as part of Delirium World Tour.
- On November 12, 2016, Justin Bieber performed a sold-out show during his Purpose World Tour. On 12 March 2023, Bieber performed there again as part of his Justice World Tour.
- Gorillaz performed at the arena on 14 November 2017, as part of their Humanz Tour.
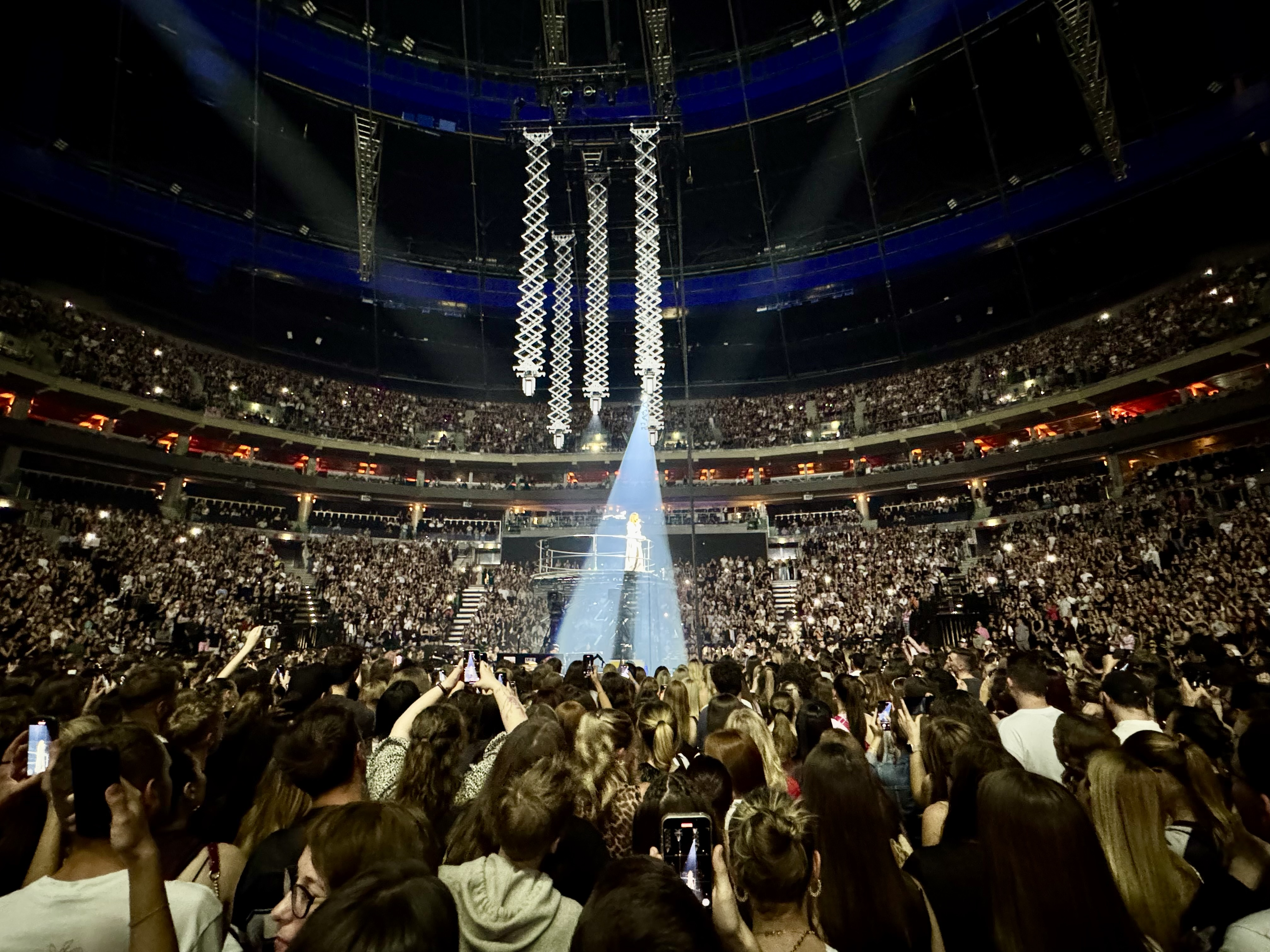
  Tate McRae concert in 2025
- On 2 April 2018, Metallica performed there as part of WorldWired Tour.
- On 16 April 2018 Imagine Dragons performed here as a part of their Evolve World Tour.
- On 7 & 8 May 2018, Enrique Iglesias performed there as part of Enrique Iglesias Live.
- On 1 July 2018 Pearl Jam performed there as part of the Pearl Jam 2018 Tour.
- On 10 October 2018, Shania Twain performed there as part of the Shania Now Tour.
- On 7 May 2019, Elton John performed there as part of Farewell Yellow Brick Road
- On 4 September 2019, Ariana Grande performed there as part of the Sweetener World Tour.
- On 16 February 2019, Twenty One Pilots performed there as part of The Bandito Tour. The band returned to the venue on 12 April 2025 during the European leg of The Clancy World Tour.
- On 29 April 2022, 5 Seconds of Summer performed there as part of their Take My Hand World Tour.
- On 11 June 2022, My Chemical Romance performed there as part as their My Chemical Romance Reunion Tour.
- On 15 July 2022, Harry Styles performed there as a part of his Love on Tour.
- On 21 December 2022, Symphonic Metal act Nightwish performed there as part of the Human. :II: Nature. World Tour.
- On 28 October 2023, 50 Cent bought his Final Lap Tour to the arena. Busta Rhymes was the opening act.
- On 30 & 31 May 2023, Iron Maiden performed two sold out shows as part of their Future Past Tour.
- On 19 September 2023, Blink-182 performed there as part of their World Tour 2023/2024.
- On 16 October 2024, American singer Melanie Martinez performed there as part of The Trilogy Tour.
- On 27 and 28 May 2025, British-Albanian singer Dua Lipa performed two concerts of the Radical Optimism Tour
- On 1 June 2025, American singer Billie Eilish performed a sold out show of her Hit Me Hard and Soft Tour with a record attendance of 20 209 people.
- On 11 June 2025, Canadian singer Tate McRae performed a show as part of her Miss Possessive Tour.
- On 7 September 2025, British pop singer Robbie Williams performed at the arena as part of his Robbie Williams Live 2025 tour.

=== Sport ===
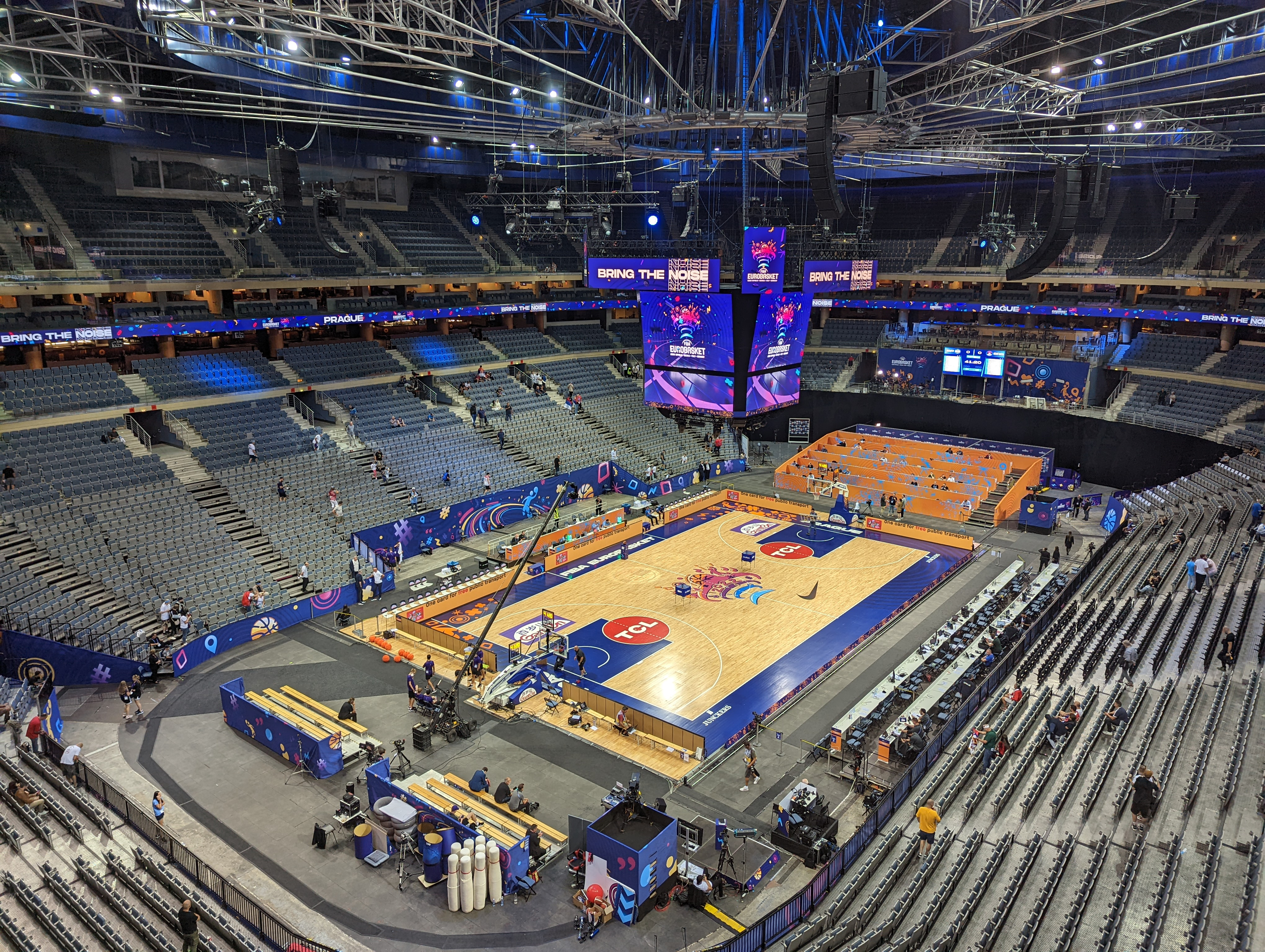
During the EuroBasket 2022

- In October 2008, the New York Rangers and Tampa Bay Lightning opened the 2008–09 NHL season at O2 Arena with two games. In 2010, the NHL returned, with the Boston Bruins and Phoenix Coyotes playing twice. In 2019, the NHL returned again with the Chicago Blackhawks and Philadelphia Flyers opening the season at the arena. After a two year hiatus, the arena opened the 2022 season with the San Jose Sharks and Nashville Predators playing twice. The arena opened the 2024-25 season with the Buffalo Sabres and New Jersey Devils playing twice.
- In December 2008, the arena played host to the playoff matches of the 2008 Men's World Floorball Championships, including Finland's 7–6 victory over Sweden in the final.
- The Czech Republic Davis Cup Team defeated Spain in the 2012 Davis Cup Final.
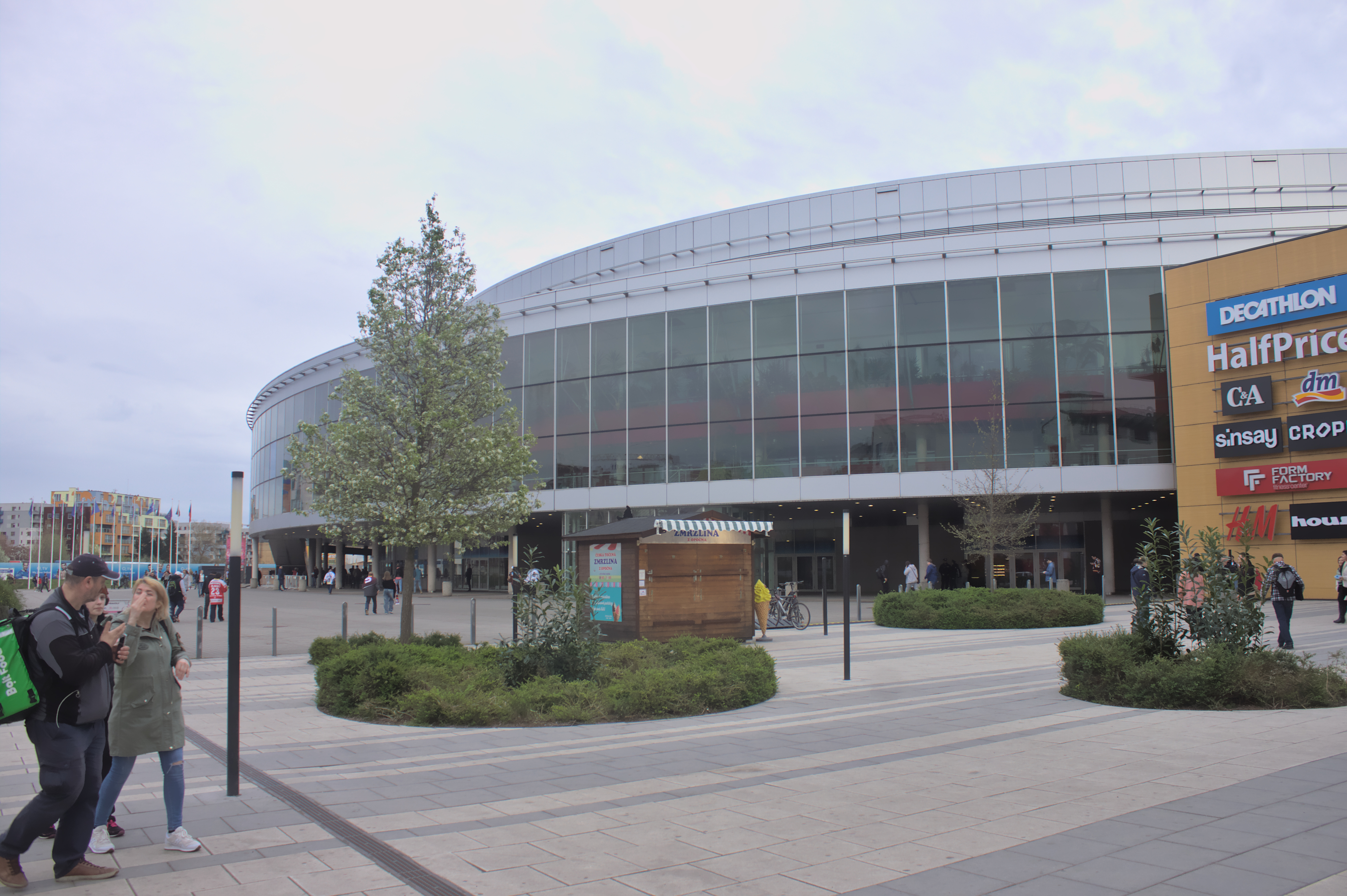
  Square in front of the Arena, 2024
- The Czech Fed Cup team contested the Fed Cup at the O2 Arena four times between 2012 and 2018. The arena hosted the final of the 2012 Fed Cup against Serbia. In November 2014 the Czech Republic defeated Germany in the final of the 2014 Fed Cup. In November 2015, the arena hosted the 2015 Fed Cup final against Russia, while the 2018 Fed Cup, which the Czech Republic won against the United States, resulted in the country's sixth cup win in eight years.
- In February 2019, UFC Fight Night: Błachowicz vs. Santos (also known as UFC Fight Night 145 or UFC on ESPN+ 3) was held at the O_{2} Arena. The event marked the promotion's first visit to the Czech Republic.

== Technical facts ==
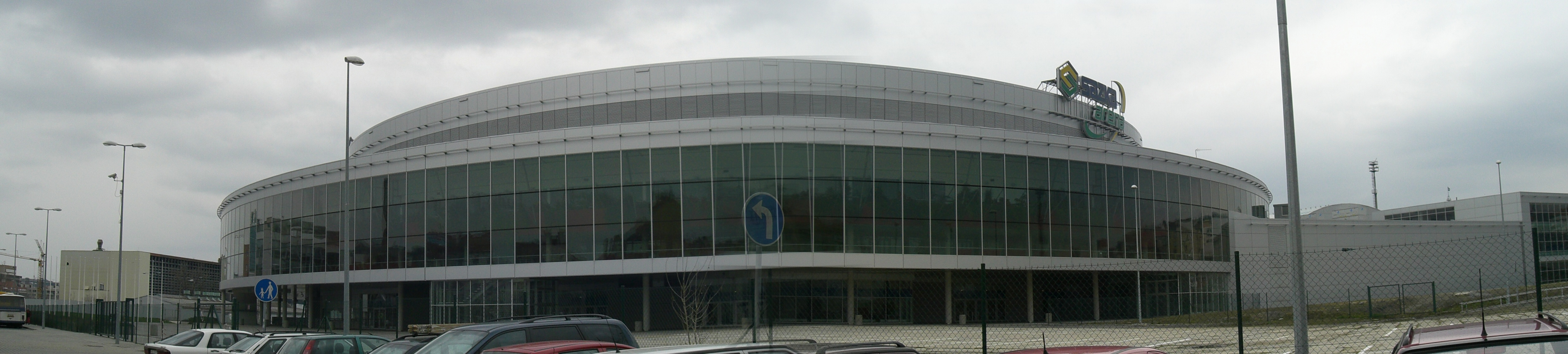
Panorama of O2 Arena (March 2007)

- Number of floors: 6
- Height: 33 m
- Roof diameter: 135 m
- Floor space: 35,000 m^{2}
- Capacity:
  - Concerts: up to 20.209 people (record broke with Billie Eilish concert in 2025)
  - Ice hockey: 17 383
  - Basketball: 16 805
  - Tennis: 14 000
- Club and Luxury seats: 2,460
- Sky boxes: 66
- Party Boxes: 4
- Seats in bars, restaurants and cafés: 2,900
- Beers that can be tapped in one break: 30,000
- Parking: 280 places
- Population of its catchment area: 2.2 million people (as of 2025)
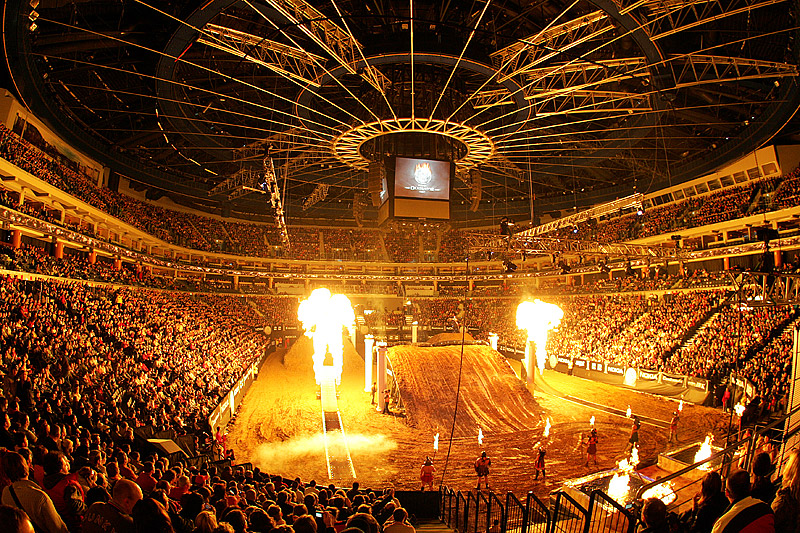
Interior of O2 Arena (2007)

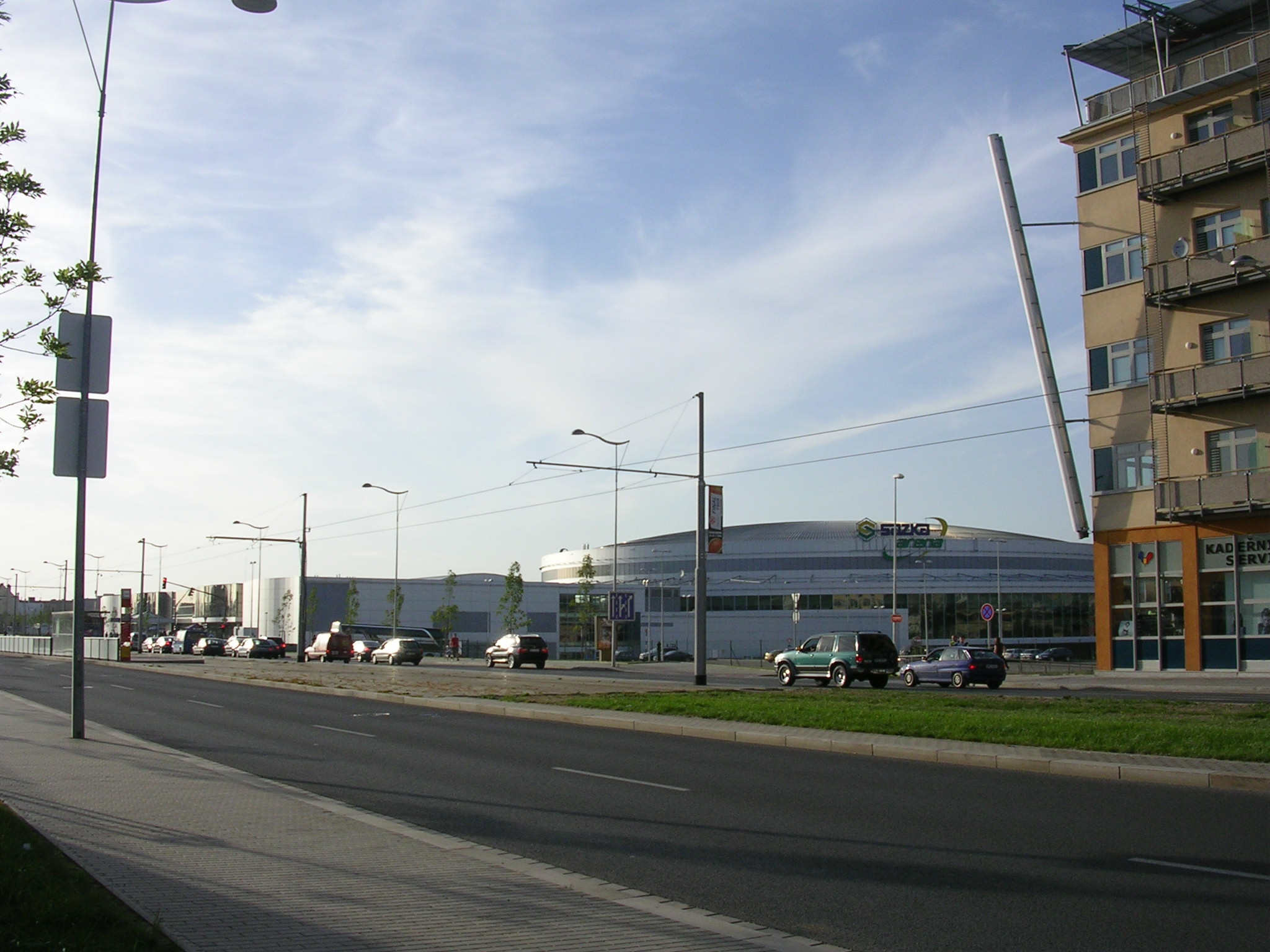
View from Českomoravská street

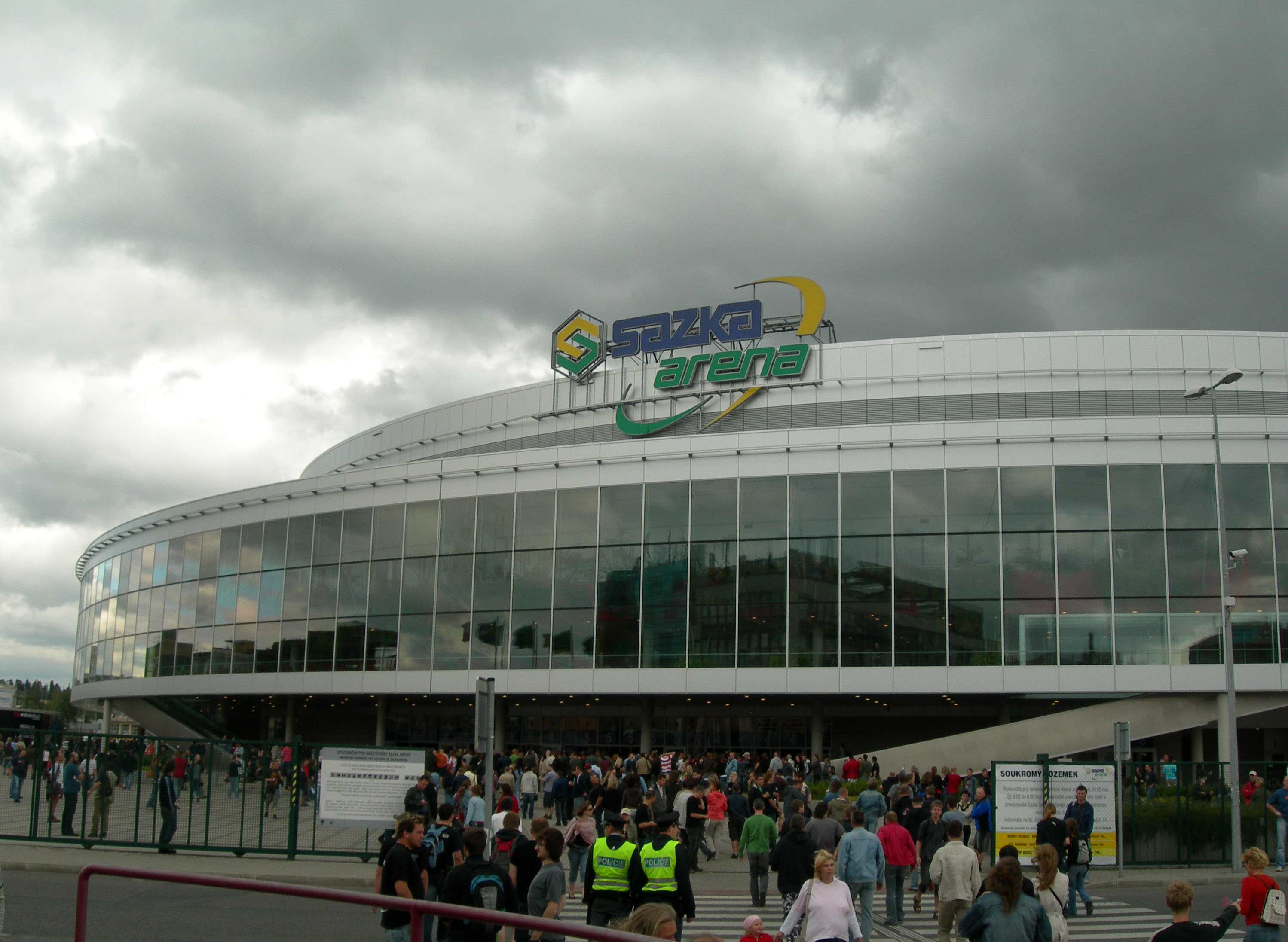
Sazka Arena in June 2007, before Ozzy Osbourne's concert

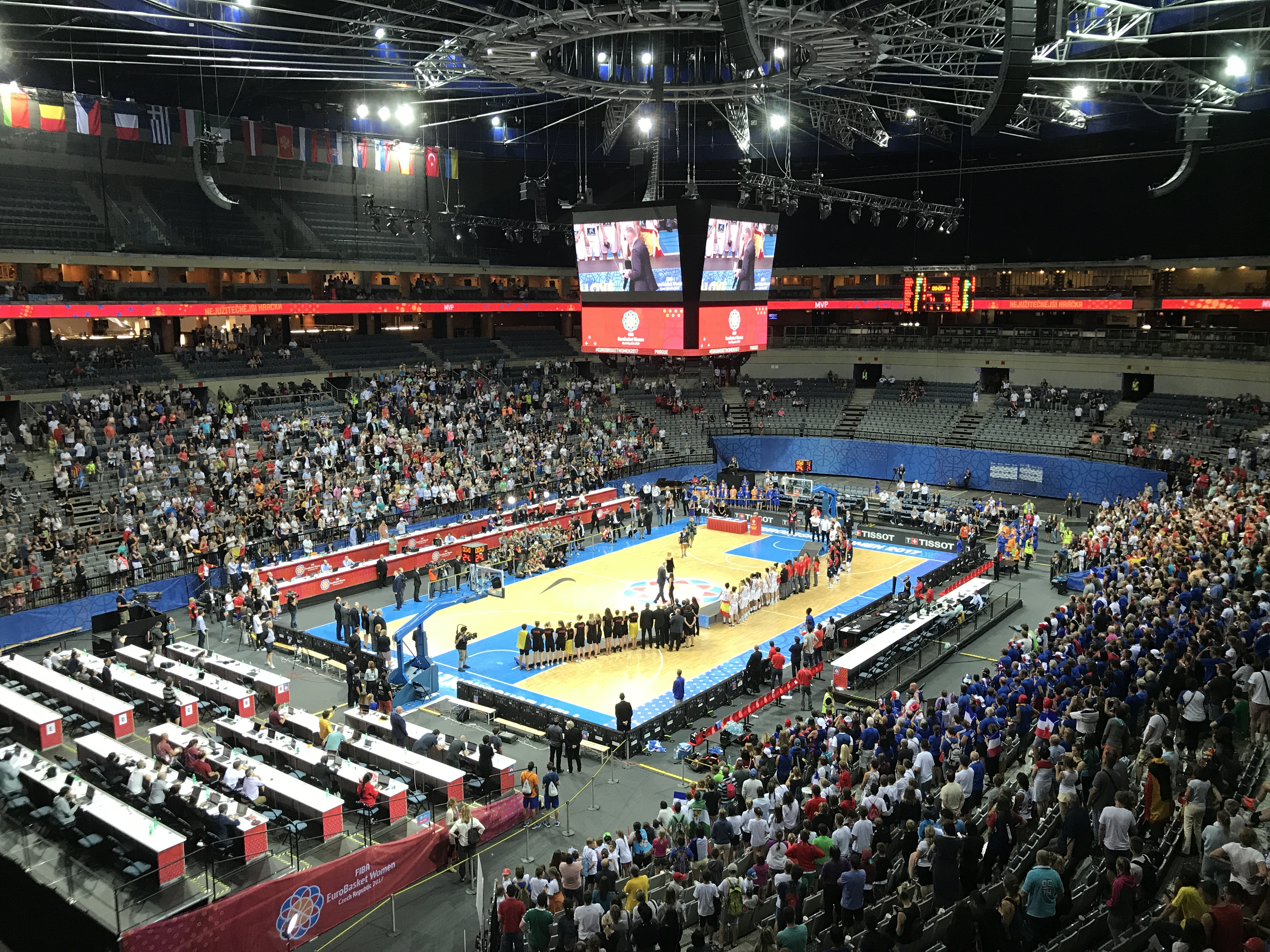
Final ceremony of EuroBasket Women 2017 in O2 Arena

== See also ==
- List of indoor arenas in the Czech Republic
- List of European ice hockey arenas
- List of tennis stadiums by capacity
- The O2 Arena (London)

Events and tenants
Preceded by Zimní Stadion Eden	HC Slavia Praha; Home Arena; 2004 – 2015	Succeeded by Zimní Stadion Eden
Preceded by Olimpiisky Arena; Moscow	Euroleague; Final Four; Venue; 2006	Succeeded by Olympic Indoor Hall; Athens
Preceded by Globe Arena; Stockholm	IFF World Championships; Finals Venue; 2008	Succeeded by TBD
Preceded by Hala MOSiR; Łódź	CEV Champions League; Final Venue; 2009	Succeeded by Arena Łódź; Łódź
Preceded by Olympic Stadium; Moscow; Tennis Club Cagliar; Cagliari	Fed Cup; Final Venue; 2011; 2014, 2015	Succeeded by Tennis Club Cagliar; Cagliari; Rhénus Sport; Strasbourg
Preceded by Estadio de La Cartuja; Seville	Davis Cup; Final venue 2012	Succeeded by Kombank Arena; Belgrade
Preceded by Scandinavium; Gothenburg	European Athletics Indoor Championships; Venue; 2015	Succeeded by Kombank Arena; Belgrade
Preceded by Tipsport Arena	HC Sparta Praha; Home Arena; 2015 –	Succeeded by current
