= 2027 World Climbing Championship =

Biennial competition climbing event

- Venue: Arena Brno
- Location: (Czech Republic) Brno, Czechia
- Date: 13–22 August 2027
- Website: Brno2027

The 2027 World Climbing Championship, the 20th edition of the event, will be held at the newly built Arena Brno in Brno, Czechia, from 13 to 22 August 2027. The competition climbing championship consists of lead, speed, and bouldering, and for the first time ever, Paraclimbing World Climbing Championship will be held at the same time as the other climbing disciplines.

World Climbing (then known as International Federation of Sport Climbing) chose Brno ahead of host city candidates in China, France, and Indonesia. Adam Ondra, Czech climber, resident of Brno, and four-time world champion, served as the face of the host city bid.

The World Championship will double as the first opportunity for athletes to qualify for the 2028 Olympics in Los Angeles.

== See also ==
- 2027 World Climbing Series
