= EHF Euro 2026 =

EHF Euro 2026 can refer to:

- 2026 European Men's Handball Championship
- 2026 European Women's Handball Championship
