= List of indoor arenas in the Czech Republic =

The following is a list of indoor arenas in the Czech Republic with a capacity of at least 1,000 spectators, most of the arenas in this list are for multi use proposes and are used for popular sports such as individual sports like karate, judo, boxing as well as team sports like Ice Hockey, basketball, volleyball. Parts of the arenas also host many concerts and world tours.

== Currently in use ==
Location	Arena	Date built	Capacity	Image
Břeclav	Zimní stadion Břeclav	1972	4,089	
Brno	Winning Group Arena	1982	7,700	
Brno	Starez aréna Vodova	2001	3,000	
Brno	Arena Brno	2026	13,300	
České Budějovice	Budvar Arena	2002	6,421	
Chomutov	Rocknet aréna	2011	5,250	
Havířov	Gascontrol Aréna	1968	5,100	
Hradec Králové	ČPP Arena	1957	7,700	
Jihlava	Horácká aréna	2025	5,750	
Karlovy Vary	Mattoni Arena	2009	5,874	
Kladno	ČEZ Stadion	1949	5,200	
Kravaře	Buly Arena	2003	1,000	
Liberec	Home Credit Arena	2005	7,500	
Litvínov	Zimní stadion Ivana Hlinky	1965	5,944	
Mladá Boleslav	Ško-Energo Aréna	1956	4,200	
Olomouc	Zimní stadion Olomouc	1948	5,500	
Ostrava	Ostravar Aréna	1986	9,833	
Opava	Zimní stadion Opava	1953	5,500	
Pardubice	Enteria arena	1960	10,088	
Plzeň	LOGSPEED CZ Aréna	1969	7,536	
Prague	Sportovní hala Královka	1965	2,500	
Prague	O2 Arena	2004	17,220	
Prague	Sportovní hala Fortuna	1962	13,238	
Přerov	MEO Arena	1971	3,000	
Třinec	Werk Arena	2014	5,200	
Ústí nad Labem	Zimní stadion Ústí nad Labem	1956	6,500	
Vsetín	Na Lapači	1966	5,400	
Zlín	Trinity Bank Arena Luďka Čajky	1957	7,000	
Znojmo	Nevoga Arena	1970	4,800	

== Under construction ==
Arena	Capacity	Opening	Location
DD Arena	22,296	2027	Pardubice

== See also ==
- List of football stadiums in the Czech Republic
- List of indoor arenas by capacity
- Lists of stadiums
