= Winning Group Arena =

Ice hockey stadium in the Czech Republic

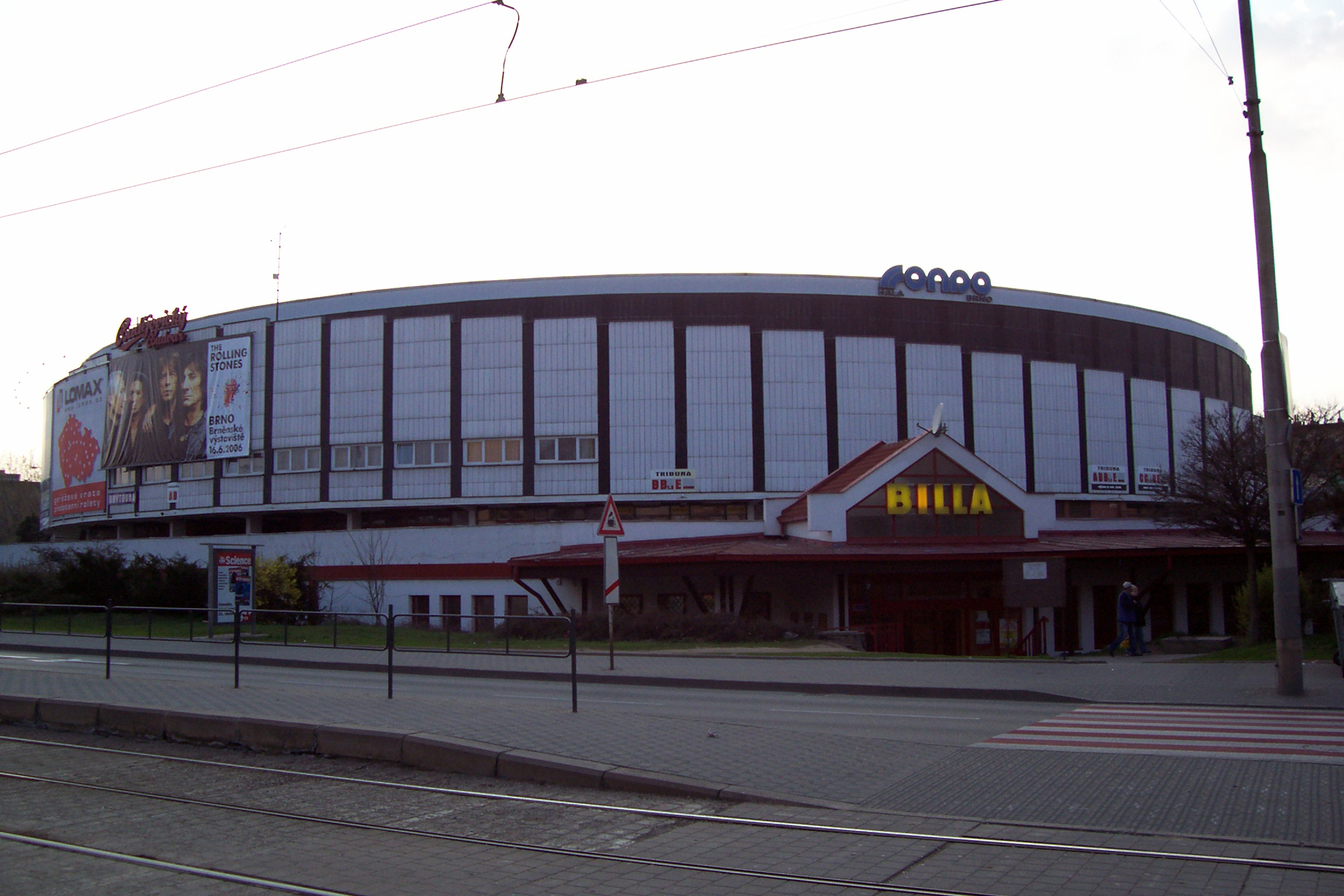
- Interactive map of Winning Group Arena
- Former names: DRFG Arena, Starobrno Rondo Aréna, Hala Rondo, Kajot Arena
- Location: Křídlovická 911, Brno, Czech Republic, 603 00
- Coordinates: 49.185420°N 16.602053°E
- Operator: KOMETA GROUP, a.s.
- Capacity: 7,700 (seated 4,700)
- Public transit: Křídlovická (tram 8)

Construction
- Opened: 1982
- Renovated: 2010, 2015
- Architect: Ing. Ivan Ruller

Tenant
- HC Kometa Brno

Winning Group Arena is an indoor arena in Brno, Czech Republic. The capacity of the arena is 7,700 people and it was built in 1982. It is currently home to the HC Kometa Brno ice hockey team.

Until 2011, the arena was named Hala Rondo. However, after Kajotbet started sponsoring the arena, it was renamed Kajot Arena. After the end of the contract, it was called "Rondo Hall" again until a new sponsorship with DRFG was signed in 2015, renaming the arena to DRFG Arena.

This will be used for the 2026 European Women's Handball Championship for the preliminary round if Arena Brno isn't built in time.

== See also ==
- List of indoor arenas in the Czech Republic
- Arena Brno
