= 2027 World Climbing Series =

Sport season in competition climbing

- Organiser: World Climbing
- Edition: 39th
- Events: 19: 6 Boulder 6 Lead 6 Speed
- Locations: 13: Tokyo (B) Keqiao (B) Shanghai (L, S) Wujiang (S) Gunsan (S) Bern (B) Manchester (L, S) Innsbruck (B, L) Chamonix (L, S) Madrid (L) Koper (L) Los Angeles (B, S) Paris (B)
- Dates: 9 April – 26 September 2027

The 2027 World Climbing Series is the 39th edition of the international competition climbing series organised by World Climbing. It will be held in 13 locations with 19 events per gender: six events each in the competition bouldering and competition lead climbing disciplines, and six events in the competition speed climbing discipline. The 2027 series begins on 9 April in Tokyo with the first bouldering event of the season and concludes on 26 September with the boulder event in Paris.

== Scheduling ==
World Climbing announced the 2027 competition schedule in October 27, announcing 13 hosts for 6 events each in bouldering, lead, and speed.

The schedule accommodates the 2027 World Climbing Championship in Brno, Czech Republic, in August, as well as the 2027 European Games in June and 2027 Pan American Games in July.

== Competition format and ranking ==
The top three finishers in each individual competition receive medals, and the overall winners are awarded trophies. At the end of the season, an overall ranking is determined based upon points, which athletes are awarded for finishing in the top 80 of each individual event.

== Overview ==
No.	Location	D	G	Gold	Silver	Bronze
1	(Japan) Tokyo; 9–11 April	B	M			
1	(Japan) Tokyo; 9–11 April	B	W			
1	(China) Keqiao; 16–18 April	B	M			
1	(China) Keqiao; 16–18 April	B	W			
2	(China) Shanghai; 23–25 April	L	M			
2	(China) Shanghai; 23–25 April	L	W			
2	(China) Shanghai; 23–25 April	S	M			
2	(China) Shanghai; 23–25 April	S	W			
2	(China) Wujiang; 30 April–4 May	S	M			
2	(China) Wujiang; 30 April–4 May	S	W			
2	(South Korea) Gunsan; 7–9 May	S	M			
2	(South Korea) Gunsan; 7–9 May	S	W			
3	(Switzerland) Bern; 28–30 May	B	M			
3	(Switzerland) Bern; 28–30 May	B	W			
2	(United Kingdom) Manchester; 4–6 June	L	M			
2	(United Kingdom) Manchester; 4–6 June	L	W			
2	(United Kingdom) Manchester; 4–6 June	S	M			
2	(United Kingdom) Manchester; 4–6 June	S	W			
6	(Austria) Innsbruck; 9–13 June	B	M			
6	(Austria) Innsbruck; 9–13 June	B	W			
6	(Austria) Innsbruck; 9–13 June	L	M			
6	(Austria) Innsbruck; 9–13 June	L	W			
8	(France) Chamonix; 9–11 July	S	M			
8	(France) Chamonix; 9–11 July	S	W			
8	(France) Chamonix; 9–11 July	L	M			
8	(France) Chamonix; 9–11 July	L	W			
4	(Spain) Madrid; 16–17 July	L	M			
4	(Spain) Madrid; 16–17 July	L	W			
9	(Slovenia) Koper; 3–4 September	L	M			
9	(Slovenia) Koper; 3–4 September	L	W			
5	(United States) Los Angeles; 7–12 September	B	M			
5	(United States) Los Angeles; 7–12 September	B	W			
5	(United States) Los Angeles; 7–12 September	S	M			
5	(United States) Los Angeles; 7–12 September	S	W			
3	(France) Paris; 24–26 September	B	M			
3	(France) Paris; 24–26 September	B	W			
OVERALL		B	M			
OVERALL		B	W			
OVERALL		L	M			
OVERALL		L	W			
OVERALL		S	M			
OVERALL		S	W			

== Season podium table ==
Rank	Nation	Gold	Silver	Bronze	Total
1	Australia (AUS)	0	0	0	0
1	China (CHN)	0	0	0	0
1	France (FRA)	0	0	0	0
1	Great Britain (GBR)	0	0	0	0
1	Indonesia (INA)	0	0	0	0
1	Japan (JPN)	0	0	0	0
1	Slovenia (SLO)	0	0	0	0
1	South Korea (KOR)	0	0	0	0
1	Spain (ESP)	0	0	0	0
1	Ukraine (UKR)	0	0	0	0
1	United States (USA)	0	0	0	0
Totals (11 entries)		0	0	0	0

== Medal table ==
Rank	Nation	Gold	Silver	Bronze	Total
1	Australia (AUS)	0	0	0	0
1	Austria (AUT)	0	0	0	0
1	Belgium (BEL)	0	0	0	0
1	Bulgaria (BUL)	0	0	0	0
1	China (CHN)	0	0	0	0
1	France (FRA)	0	0	0	0
1	Germany (GER)	0	0	0	0
1	Great Britain (GBR)	0	0	0	0
1	Individual Neutral Athletes (AIN)	0	0	0	0
1	Indonesia (INA)	0	0	0	0
1	Israel (ISR)	0	0	0	0
1	Italy (ITA)	0	0	0	0
1	Japan (JPN)	0	0	0	0
1	Poland (POL)	0	0	0	0
1	Slovenia (SLO)	0	0	0	0
1	South Korea (KOR)	0	0	0	0
1	Spain (ESP)	0	0	0	0
1	Switzerland (SUI)	0	0	0	0
1	Ukraine (UKR)	0	0	0	0
1	United States (USA)	0	0	0	0
Totals (20 entries)		0	0	0	0

== See also ==
- 2027 World Climbing Championship
