= 2013–14 KHL season =

- League: Kontinental Hockey League
- Sport: Ice hockey
- Duration: 4 September 2013 – April 2014
- Teams: 28

Regular season
- Continental Cup winner: (Russia) Dynamo Moscow
- Top scorer: (Russia) Sergei Mozyakin

Playoffs
- Western champions: (Czech Republic) Lev Praha
- Western runners-up: (Russia) Lokomotiv Yaroslavl
- Eastern champions: (Russia) Metallurg Magnitogorsk
- Eastern runners-up: (Russia) Salavat Yulaev Ufa

Gagarin Cup
- Champions: (Russia) Metallurg Magnitogorsk
- Runners-up: (Czech Republic) Lev Praha

KHL seasons
- ← 2012–13 2014–15 →

The 2013–14 KHL season was the sixth season of the Kontinental Hockey League.

The league's 28 teams played a 54-game balanced schedule. The regular season began on 4 September with the Lokomotiv Cup between last year's finalists Dynamo Moscow and Traktor Chelyabinsk. The all-star game took place on 11 January in Bratislava, Slovakia and was followed by a 27-day break for the 2014 Winter Olympics in Sochi from 30 January to 25 February. The last day of the regular season was 4 March.

Sixteen teams, eight from each conference, advanced to the Gagarin Cup playoffs, which began on 7 March. The winner of each conference, Metallurg Magnitogorsk from the East and Lev Prague from the West, met in the Gagarin Cup Final. The seventh and last game was played on 30 April, with Metallurg winning 7–4. All four playoff rounds were best-of-seven series. As of right now, Lev Prague are the only non-Russian team to play in the Gagarin Cup

== Changes ==
=== Team changes ===
In late April 2013 it was announced that a newly created team from Vladivostok would be admitted to league and become the league's second far-eastern team. The team is called Admiral Vladivostok and its name and emblem were chosen by the public. Its initial roster was filled in an expansion draft on 17 June.

A few days after Vladivostok was admitted to the league it was also confirmed that KHL Medveščak from Zagreb, Croatia would join the league. Medveščak previously played in Austrian-based EBEL league. This made Croatia the eighth country with a KHL team.

In June 2013 Vityaz Chekhov officially announced its relocation to nearby Podolsk, Moscow Oblast where it can play in a bigger arena.

== Regular season ==
The regular season began on 4 September 2013 with the Lokomotiv Cup between the finalists of the previous season, Dynamo Moscow and Traktor Chelyabinsk and ended on 4 March 2014 after every team has played 54 matches.

=== League standings ===
Points are awarded as follows:

- 3 Points for a win in regulation ("W")
- 2 Points for a win in overtime ("OTW") or a penalty shootout ("SOW")
- 1 Point for a loss in overtime ("OTL") or a penalty shootout ("SOL")
- 0 Points for a loss in regulation ("L")

The conference standings determine the seedings for the play-offs. The first two places in each conference are reserved for the division winners.

	Western Conference	Div	GP	W	OTW	SOW	SOL	OTL	L	GF	GA	Pts
1	C – Dynamo Moscow	TAR	54	34	2	2	5	0	11	171	113	115
2	Y – SKA Saint Petersburg	BOB	54	30	1	4	4	1	14	175	115	105
3	HC Lev Praha	BOB	54	23	3	9	2	4	13	149	107	99
4	HC Donbass	TAR	54	27	3	4	2	0	18	135	99	97
5	Dinamo Riga	BOB	54	22	5	6	4	1	16	141	122	93
6	Medveščak Zagreb	BOB	54	24	1	3	8	4	14	138	126	92
7	CSKA Moscow	BOB	54	25	2	5	1	1	20	130	118	91
8	Lokomotiv Yaroslavl	TAR	54	23	2	3	4	1	21	109	103	84
9	Atlant Moscow Oblast	TAR	54	19	1	7	3	2	22	123	120	78
10	Severstal Cherepovets	TAR	54	20	0	5	5	2	22	128	135	77
11	Slovan Bratislava	BOB	54	15	3	6	3	1	26	120	160	67
13	Spartak Moscow	TAR	54	12	4	4	4	2	28	105	147	58
12	Vityaz Podolsk	TAR	54	12	1	5	9	1	26	110	147	58
14	Dinamo Minsk	BOB	54	13	1	3	4	2	31	102	161	53

Y – Clinched Division;
C – Clinched Continental Cup;
BOB – Bobrov Division,
TAR – Tarasov Division

	Eastern Conference	Div	GP	W	OTW	SOW	SOL	OTL	L	GF	GA	Pts
1	Z – Metallurg Magnitogorsk	KHA	54	30	3	2	6	2	11	166	113	108
2	Y – Barys Astana	CHE	54	26	2	4	2	2	18	182	157	94
3	Ak Bars Kazan	KHA	54	26	4	4	5	1	14	139	108	100
4	Salavat Yulaev Ufa	CHE	54	25	3	3	4	3	16	155	140	94
4	Torpedo Nizhny Novgorod	KHA	54	25	2	5	3	2	17	153	121	94
6	Sibir Novosibirsk	CHE	54	22	2	5	6	1	18	125	117	87
7	Avtomobilist Yekaterinburg	KHA	54	22	0	7	5	1	19	134	125	86
8	Admiral Vladivostok	CHE	54	21	1	4	4	1	23	135	129	78
9	Traktor Chelyabinsk	KHA	54	18	1	6	5	2	22	126	148	75
10	Avangard Omsk	CHE	54	17	1	5	4	2	25	136	162	69
11	Yugra Khanty-Mansiysk	KHA	54	16	1	3	2	6	26	128	166	64
12	Neftekhimik Nizhnekamsk	KHA	54	15	2	2	3	1	31	127	152	57
13	Metallurg Novokuznetsk	CHE	54	12	1	1	4	6	30	115	170	50
14	Amur Khabarovsk	CHE	54	8	1	4	10	1	30	106	182	45

Y – Clinched Division;
Z – Clinched Conference
KHA – Kharlamov Division,
CHE – Chernyshev Division

=== Player statistics ===
==== Scoring leaders ====
GP = Games played; G = Goals; A = Assists; Pts = Points; +/– = P Plus–minus; PIM = Penalty minutes

As of 3 Mar 2014

Player	Team	GP	G	A	Pts	+/–	PIM
(Russia) Sergei Mozyakin	Metallurg Magnitogorsk	54	34	39	73	+43	8
(Czech Republic) Jan Kovář	Metallurg Magnitogorsk	54	23	45	68	+46	46
(Russia) Danis Zaripov	Metallurg Magnitogorsk	53	25	39	64	+42	32
(United States) Brandon Bochenski	Barys Astana	54	28	30	58	+17	55
(Canada) Nigel Dawes	Barys Astana	54	26	23	49	+7	18
(Finland) Sakari Salminen	Torpedo Nizhny Novgorod	54	18	29	47	+8	16
(Russia) Fedor Malykhin	Avtomobilist Yekaterinburg	54	22	22	44	+14	26
(Canada) Kyle Wilson	Dinamo Riga	49	17	27	44	+9	26
(Finland) Jori Lehterä	Sibir Novosibirsk	48	12	32	44	+14	22
(Slovakia) Marcel Hossa	Dinamo Riga	50	22	19	41	+9	33

==== Leading goaltenders ====
GP = Games played; Min = Minutes played; W = Wins; L = Losses; SOP = Shootouts played; GA = Goals against; SO = Shutouts; SV% = Save percentage; GAA = Goals against average

As of 3 Mar 2014

Player	Team	GP	Min	W	L	SOP	GA	SO	SV%	GAA
(Russia) Emil Garipov	Ak Bars Kazan	20	1219:36	13	5	2	29	3	.952	1.43
(Kazakhstan) Vitali Kolesnik	Lokomotiv Yaroslavl	19	955:45	7	4	5	24	3	.946	1.51
(Russia) Georgi Gelashvili	Torpedo Nizhny Novgorod	20	1163:32	12	6	1	31	5	.939	1.60
(Finland) Petri Vehanen	HC Lev Praha	41	2495:22	20	13	8	69	4	.932	1.66
(Finland) Mikko Koskinen	Sibir Novosibirsk	41	2361:35	20	11	8	67	3	.939	1.70

== Playoffs ==
The playoffs started on 7 March 2014, with the top eight teams from each of the conferences, and ended on 30 April with the last game of the Gagarin Cup final.

During the first three rounds home ice was determined by seeding number within the Conference, not position on the bracket. In the Finals the team with better seeding number had home ice advantage. If the seeding numbers were equal, the regular season record was taken into account.

=== Bracket ===
Conference Quarterfinals	Conference Semifinals
1	(Russia) Metallurg Mg	4
8	(Russia) Admiral	1
1	(Russia) Metallurg Mg	4
6	(Russia) Sibir	0
2	(Kazakhstan) Barys	4
7	(Russia) Avtomobilist	0
Eastern Conference
3	(Russia) Ak Bars	2
6	(Russia) Sibir	4
2	(Kazakhstan) Barys	2
4	(Russia) Salavat Yulaev	4
4	(Russia) Salavat Yulaev	4
5	(Russia) Torpedo	3
1	(Russia) Dynamo Msk	3
8	(Russia) Lokomotiv	4
2	(Russia) SKA	2
8	(Russia) Lokomotiv	4
2	(Russia) SKA	4
7	(Russia) CSKA	0
Western Conference
3	(Czech Republic) Lev	4
6	(Croatia) Medveščak	0
3	(Czech Republic) Lev	4
4	(Ukraine) Donbass	2
4	(Ukraine) Donbass	4
5	(Latvia) Dinamo Rg	3

Conference Finals
1	(Russia) Metallurg Mg	4
4	(Russia) Salavat Yulaev	1
3	(Czech Republic) Lev	4
8	(Russia) Lokomotiv	1

Gagarin Cup Finals
1	(Russia) Metallurg Mg	4
3	(Czech Republic) Lev	3

=== Player statistics ===
==== Playoff scoring leaders ====
Updated on 30 April 2014. Source: khl.ru

GP = Games played; G = Goals; A = Assists; Pts = Points; +/– = P Plus–minus; PIM = Penalty minutes

Player	Team	GP	G	A	Pts	+/–	PIM
Sergei Mozyakin	Metallurg Magnitogorsk	21	13	20	33	+14	8
Danis Zaripov	Metallurg Magnitogorsk	21	11	15	26	+12	34
Jan Kovář	Metallurg Magnitogorsk	21	8	18	26	+12	16
Justin Azevedo	HC Lev Praha	22	13	7	20	+4	6
Roman Červenka	SKA Saint Petersburg	10	6	11	17	+6	8

==== Playoff leading goaltenders ====
Updated on 30 April 2014. Source: khl.ru

GP = Games played; Min = Minutes played; W = Wins; L = Losses; SOL = Shootout losses; GA = Goals against; SO = Shutouts; SV% = Save percentage; GAA = Goals against average

Player	Team	GP	Min	W	L	SOL	GA	SO	SV%	GAA
Ivan Kasutin	Torpedo Nizhny Novgorod	6	390:53	3	3	0	10	1	94.4	1.53
Ján Laco	HC Donbass	8	385:20	3	3	0	11	0	93.4	1.71
Jakub Sedláček	Dinamo Riga	5	270:01	3	2	0	8	0	93.8	1.78
Curtis Sanford	Lokomotiv Yaroslavl	18	1124:50	9	9	0	36	2	93.4	1.92
Alexander Salák	SKA Saint Petersburg	10	621:32	6	4	0	20	2	94.0	1.93

== Nadezhda Cup ==
The 12 teams that do not advance to Gagarin Cup Playoffs participate in Nadezhda Cup. The teams ranked 9th and 10th in their conferences are seeded and start their games from Quarterfinals, while the other teams start their games from the first round. The First Round consists of two games. In case there is a 1–1 tie in the end of the first round, 5-minute overtime and a penalty shootout, if necessary, follow after Game 2. The other rounds consist of up to four games. If there is a 2–2 tie in the end of such a round, the series is decided in a 20-minute overtime with a shootout if necessary.

First Round
W11	Slovan Bratislava	0
W14	Dinamo Minsk	2
W12	~~Spartak Moscow~~ *
W13	Vityaz Chekhov
E11	Yugra Khanty-Mansiysk	1,d
E14	Amur Khabarovsk	0,d
E12	Neftekhimik Nizhnekamsk	2
E13	Metallurg Novokuznetsk	0

Quarterfinals
W9	Atlant Moscow Oblast	0
W14	Dinamo Minsk	3
W10	Severstal Cherepovets	3
W13	Vityaz Chekhov	1
E10	Avangard Omsk	3
E11	Yugra Khanty-Mansiysk	1
E9	Traktor Chelyabinsk	2^{SO}
E12	Neftekhimik Nizhnekamsk	2

Semifinals
W14	Dinamo Minsk	3
W10	Severstal Cherepovets	1
E10	Avangard Omsk	3
E9	Traktor Chelyabinsk	1

Final
W14	Dinamo Minsk	0
E10	Avangard Omsk	3

* Note: Spartak Moscow was excluded from Nadezhda Cup 2014 tournament due to financial issues.

== Final standings ==
Rank	Team
1	(Russia) Metallurg Magnitogorsk
2	(Czech Republic) Lev Praha
3	(Russia) Salavat Yulaev Ufa
4	(Russia) Lokomotiv Yaroslavl
5	(Russia) SKA Saint Petersburg
6	(Ukraine) HC Donbass
7	(Kazakhstan) Barys Astana
8	(Russia) Sibir Novosibirsk
9	(Russia) Dynamo Moscow
10	(Russia) Ak Bars Kazan
11	(Russia) Torpedo Nizhny Novgorod
12	(Latvia) Dinamo Riga
13	(Croatia) Medveščak Zagreb
14	(Russia) CSKA Moscow
15	(Russia) Avtomobilist Yekaterinburg
16	(Russia) Admiral Vladivostok
17	(Russia) Atlant Moscow Oblast
18	(Russia) Severstal Cherepovets
19	(Russia) Traktor Chelyabinsk
20	(Russia) Avangard Omsk
21	(Slovakia) Slovan Bratislava
22	(Russia) Yugra Khanty-Mansiysk
23	(Russia) Spartak Moscow
24	(Russia) Vityaz Chekhov
25	(Russia) Neftekhimik Nizhnekamsk
26	(Belarus) Dinamo Minsk
27	(Russia) Metallurg Novokuznetsk
28	(Russia) Amur Khabarovsk

== Awards ==
=== Players of the Month ===
Best KHL players of each month.

Month	Goaltender	Defense	Forward	Rookie
September	(Russia) Konstantin Barulin (Kazan)	(Canada) Chris Lee (Magintogorsk)	(Russia) Maxim Pestushko (Dyn. Moscow)	(Russia) Andrei Vasilevski (Ufa)
October	(Canada) Barry Brust (Zagreb)	(Russia) Maxim Chudinov (St. Petersburg)	(Russia) Danis Zaripov (Magintogorsk)	(Russia) Yaroslav Dyblenko (Atlant)
November	(Czech Republic) Alexander Salák (St. Petersburg)	(United States) Deron Quint (Spartak)	(Russia) Sergei Mozyakin (Magintogorsk)	(Russia) Andrei Vasilevski (Ufa)
December	(Czech Republic) Jakub Kovář (Yekatarinburg)	(Slovakia) Dominik Graňák (Dyn. Moscow)	(United States) Brandon Bochenski (Astana)	(Russia) Mark Skutar (Novokusnetsk)
January	(Czech Republic) Jakub Kovář (Yekatarinburg)	(Russia) Viktor Antipin (Magintogorsk)	(Russia) Sergei Mozyakin (Magintogorsk)	(Russia) Sergei Shmelyov (Atlant)
February	not awarded (Olympic break)			
March	(Canada) Curtis Sanford (Yaroslavl)	(Russia) Ilya Gorokhov (Yaroslavl)	(Russia) Sergei Mozyakin (Magintogorsk)	(Russia) Andrei Vasilevski (Ufa)
April	(Russia) Vasiliy Koshechkin (Magnitogorsk)	(Czech Republic) Ondřej Němec (Prague)	(Russia) Sergei Mozyakin (Magintogorsk)	(Russia) Andrei Vasilevski (Ufa)
