= Oradea Arena =

Multipurpose Sports Arena in Oradea, Romania

Multipurpose Sports Arena Oradea
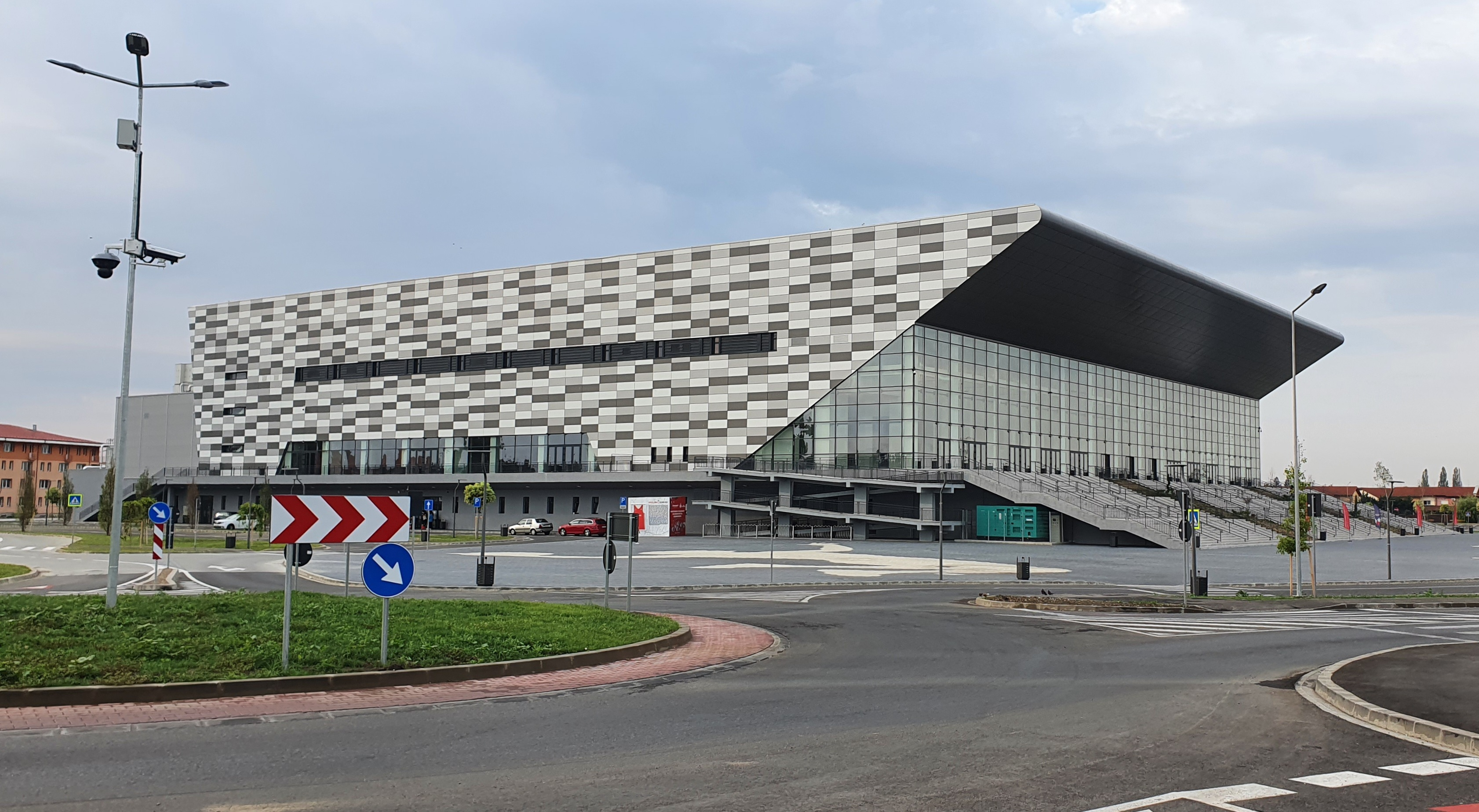
- Oradea Arena in 2022.
- Interactive map of Multipurpose Sports Arena Oradea
- Address: 24 Traian Blajovici Street
- Location: Oradea, Romania
- Coordinates: 47°02′45.6″N 21°54′50.1″E
- Owner: City of Oradea
- Operator: CSM Oradea
- Capacity: Basketball: 5,200; Handball: 5,500; Concerts: 7,000
- Type: Sports Arena

Construction
- Groundbreaking: November 2019
- Opened: 20 April 2022
- Cost: €30 million
- Architect: Adest Architecture
- General contractor: Construcții Erbașu

Tenant
- CSM Oradea (LNBM) (2022–present)

Oradea Arena is a multipurpose sports arena located in Oradea, Romania. It is the home of CSM Oradea of the Liga Națională de Baschet Masculin (LNBM).

This will be used in the 2026 European Women's Handball Championship for the preliminary round.

== See also ==
- List of indoor arenas in Romania
