= 2028 European Women's Handball Championship bidding process =

The 2028 European Women's Handball Championship bidding process entails the bids for the 2028 European Women's Handball Championship. The winners were Denmark, Norway and Sweden.

== Bidding timeline ==
The bidding timeline was as follows:

- 4 June 2020 – Invitation to National Federations to provide a letter of intent to the EHF for hosting the EHF EUROs 2026 & 2028
- 1 October 2020 – Deadline for submitting the letter of intent and request for the bidding documents by the interested federations
- 1 November 2020 – Dispatch of the manual for staging the EHF EUROs 2026 & 2028 together with the relevant specifications and forms by the EHF
- 1 May 2021 – Applications available at the EHF Office
- May/June 2021 – Evaluation of bids by the EHF
- June 2021 – Approval of applications by EHF EXEC
- June–September 2021 – Site inspections
- September 2021 – Further evaluation after inspections
- September 2021 – Confirmation of bids for the EHF EUROs 2026 & 2028
- 17/18 November 2021 – Allocation at the EO EHF Congress 2021

== Bids ==
On 11 May 2021 it was announced that the following nations sent in an official expression of interest:

- Denmark, Norway & Sweden

On 20 October the final bids were presented.

- Denmark, Norway & Sweden

=== Denmark, Norway and Sweden ===
Denmark, Norway, and Sweden arena map

Having first stating an interest as two separate bids (Denmark and Norway and a Swedish solo bid) the Scandinavians decided to all bid for an EHF Euro together for the first time ever for EHF Euro, under the slogan Scandinavia Connect. Their bids' aim is to use innovation and modern-day technologies to help Handball have a bright future.

The Swedish Handball Federation president, Frederik Rapp, stated “the commitment to finding sustainable solutions across all industries and areas of life is very clear in all of Scandinavia. To connect the Scandinavian approach and experience in sustainability with European handball is so valuable. Finding more sustainable solutions for future events could be a real game-changer for the future of our sport”.

While the Danish counterpart, Per Bertelsen said “We believe we can build on the positive momentum we see in our sport. Together, we can deliver a world-class event that will be a true celebration for European handball”.

The main round would be held in Oslo or Trondheim in Norway and either Copenhagen or Herning in Denmark. The final weekend would be in the Telenor Arena in Oslo, marking the first time Norway has hosted the final of the EHF Women's Euro (they were going to host the final in 2020, but withdrew altogether due to COVID-19). Every other venue would host preliminary round matches.

These are the following 9 venues included in the Scandinavian bid:

Denmark

- Herning – Jyske Bank Boxen, capacity 15,000
- Copenhagen – Royal Arena, capacity 13.000
- Aarhus – Ceres Arena, capacity 5,000

Norway

- Oslo – Telenor Arena, capacity 15,000
- Bergen – Byarena, capacity 12,000
- Trondheim – Trondheim Spektrum, capacity 9,000
- Stavanger – DNB Arena, capacity 5,000

Sweden

- Gothenburg – Scandinavium, capacity 10,000
- Helsingborg – Helsingborg Arena, capacity 5,000

Venue that was deemed not suitable for tournament and is no longer part of the bid:

- Kolding – Sydbank Arena, capacity 5,100

== Host selection ==
As only the Scandinavian bid remained it was unanimously selected at the 14th EHF Extraordinary Congress on 20 November 2021.
