= 2024 European Women's Handball Championship bidding process =

The 2024 European Women's Handball Championship bidding process entails the bids for the 2024 European Women's Handball Championship. The winners were Austria, Hungary and Switzerland.

== First bidding process ==
=== Bidding timeline ===
The bidding timeline was as follows:

- 1 May 2017: Bidding nations to provide official expression of interest in the hosting of the tournament
- 1 July 2017: Bidding manuals sent to all bidding federations
- 1 November 2017: Deadline for completed bidding and application documentation to be provided to the EHF office
- 15 December 2017: Applications to be approved at the EHF executive committee in Hamburg
- 20 June 2018: appointment of host(s) of EHF Euro 2022 at the 14th ordinary EHF Congress in Glasgow, Scotland

== Bids ==
Originally, there were two bids for the EHF Women's Euro 2024.

- North Macedonia
- Russia

On 5 September 2017, Russia's bid was the only bid left.

- Russia

However, later on, when the bids were announced for the 2022 and 2024 EHF Euros, Russia's bid was withdrawn and thus there were no applications left. On 20 June 2018, the day the host was supposed to be confirmed, the EHF voted to delay the awardment of the hosting rights.

Delay the vote
Delay the vote	Votes
Yes	37
No	5
Total	42

== Second bidding process ==
In April 2019, the EHF reopened the bidding process. On the 20 September 2019, there were 3 new bids.

- Austria, Hungary and Switzerland
- Czech Republic, Poland and Slovakia
- Russia

=== Austria, Hungary and Switzerland ===
Austria, Hungary, and Switzerland arena map

In June 2019, the Hungarians first stated an interest in bidding, and had already started negotiations with Austria and Switzerland. Austria and Switzerland are vying to host the event for the first time, while Hungary are trying to it for the third time, after 2004 and 2014. Their slogan is Stronger together.

The main rounds would be in Debrecen and Budapest, with the final weekend in the MVM Dome in Budapest.

These are the proposed venues:

Austria

- Innsbruck – Olympiahalle, capacity 8,000

Hungary

- Budapest – MVM Dome, capacity 20,022
- Debrecen – Főnix Hall, capacity 6,500

Switzerland

- Basel – St. Jakobshalle, capacity 12,400

=== Czech Republic, Poland and Slovakia ===
Czech Republic, Poland and Slovakia arena map

Czech Republic, Poland and Slovakia filed an application, under the slogan So close. All three have never hosted an EHF Women's Euro.

The main rounds would be in Bratislava and Katowice, while the final weekend would be in Kraków. The rest will host preliminary round matches.

These are the proposed venues:

Czech Republic

- Ostrava – Ostravar Aréna, capacity 10,000

Poland

- Kraków – Tauron Arena, capacity 15,030
- Katowice – Spodek, capacity 11,036
- Wrocław – Centennial Hall, capacity 10,000

Slovakia

- Bratislava – Ondrej Nepela Arena, capacity 10,000
- Banská Bystrica – Banska Bystrica Arena, capacity 5,000
- Šamorín – Samorin Arena, capacity 5,000

=== Russia ===
Russia arena map

Russia is asking to be the organisers of the EHF Women's Euro, which they have never hosted. Venues in Moscow, Saint Petersburg, Krasnodar and Rostov-on-Don have been proposed for the championship. Although, two weeks later, the Krylatskoye Sports Palace in Moscow and the Basket-Hall in Krasnodar were both taken out as the EHF weren't impressed with the arenas. The Irina Viner-Usmanova Gymnastics Palace in Moscow and the Sportcomplex Zvezdny in Astrakhan replaced them.

The main round groups would be held in the Sibur Arena and VTB Arena, with the final weekend in Moscow at the VTB Arena.

These were the proposed venues in Russia's bid:

- Moscow – VTB Arena, capacity 12,000
- Saint Petersburg – Sibur Arena, capacity 6,000
- Astrakhan – Sportcomplex Zvezdny, capacity 6,000
- Rostov-on-Don – new Handball Arena, capacity 5,000
- Moscow – Irina Viner-Usmanova Gymnastics Palace, capacity 3,500

Venue which was originally included, but taken out:

- Krasnodar – Basket-Hall, capacity 7,500
- Moscow – Krylatskoye Sports Palace, capacity 5,000

== Host selection ==
The host announcement took place on 25 January 2020 at the EHF Extraordinary Congress in Stockholm. The winners were Austria, Hungary and Switzerland, who defeated the Czech Republic, Poland and Slovakia bid, 28–21, in the second round.

Bids	Rounds	
Bids	Round one	Round two
Austria, Hungary and Switzerland	Advanced	28
Czech Republic, Poland and Slovakia	Advanced	21
Russia	Eliminated	–

== Possible hosting change ==
On 12 January 2023, the Hungarian government's chancellery minister, Gergely Gulyás, announced that Hungary would withdraw as hosts due to financial reasons. A few days prior, the Austrian Handball Federation was informed by the Hungarians about the decision to withdraw. The other co-hosts, Austria and Switzerland, now wanted to negotiate with the EHF about how the tournament will be held. On 28 January, the European Handball Federation released a statement concerning the issue, and said that they were amazed and surprised with the decision to potentially withdraw as co-hosts. On 16 March 2023, the EHF announced a change to the organisation structure of the championships. Hungary remained as a co-host, but played a reduced part in the hosting of the competition, including the whole portion of the tournament at the MVM Dome in Budapest (one main round group and the final weekend) being axed and replaced by Vienna. During all the uncertainty, Romania had stated that they would be able to host the tournament if the original hosts could not.
