= Mark Skutar =

Russian ice hockey player

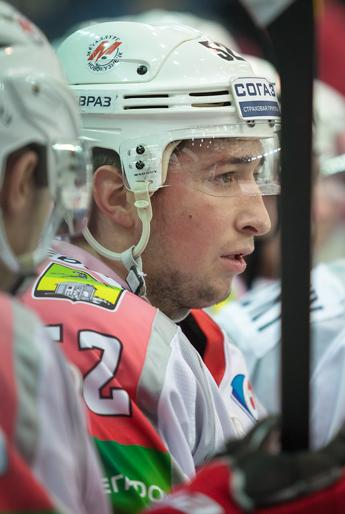
- Born: March 15, 1994 (age 31) Novokuznetsk, Russia
- Height: 5 ft 11 in (180 cm)
- Weight: 183 lb (83 kg; 13 st 1 lb)
- Position: Defence
- Shoots: Left
- KHL team Former teams: Metallurg Novokuznetsk; Admiral Vladivostok
- Playing career: 2012–present

Mark Skutar (born March 15, 1994) is a Russian ice hockey defenceman. He is currently playing with Metallurg Novokuznetsk of the Kontinental Hockey League (KHL).

Skutar made his Kontinental Hockey League debut playing with Metallurg Novokuznetsk during the 2012–13 KHL season.
