= Zimní stadion Opava =

Indoor sporting arena in Opava, Czech Republic

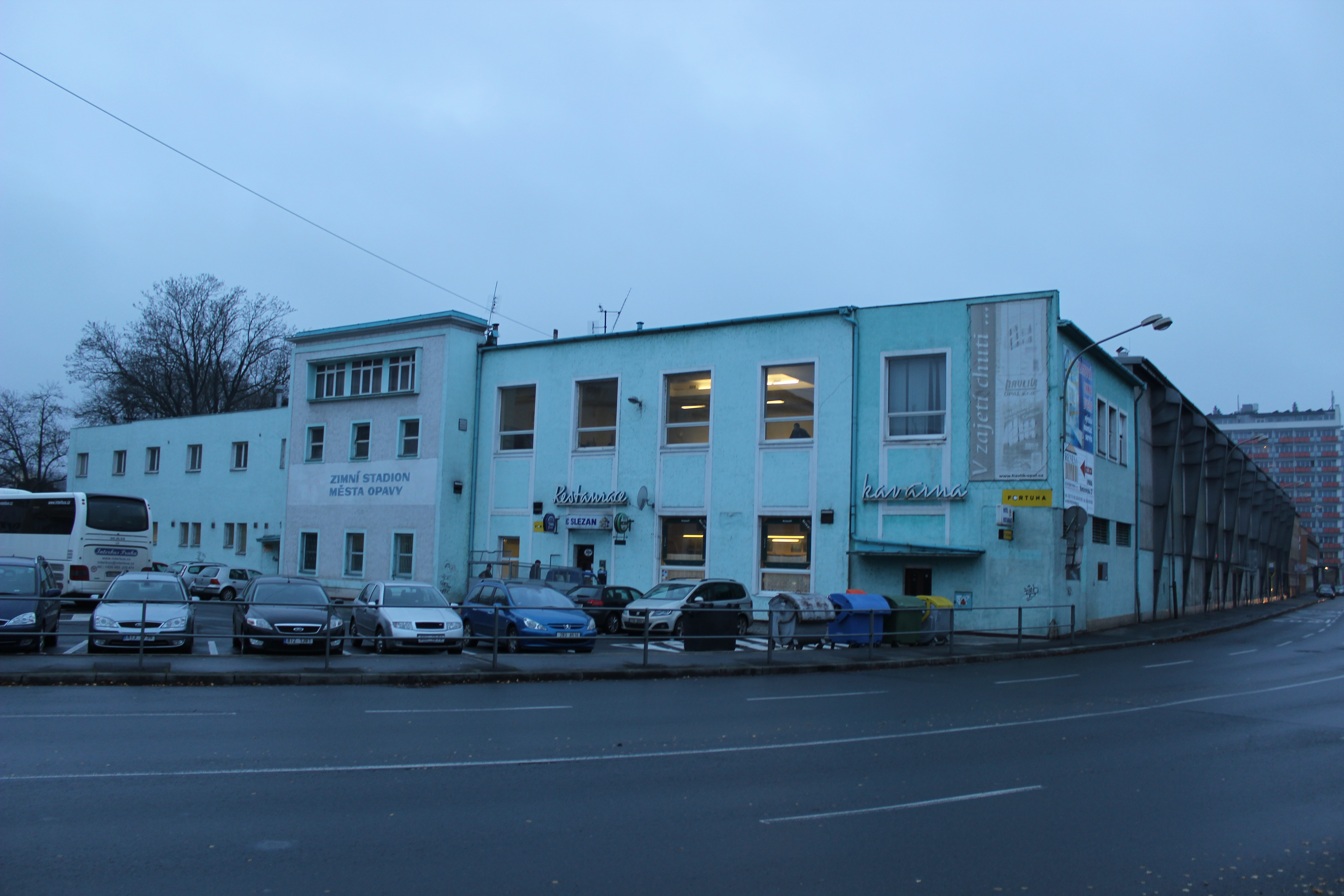
- Interactive map of Zimní stadion Opava
- Location: Zámecký okruh 8, Opava, Czech Republic 746 01
- Coordinates: 49°56′15.324″N 17°54′39.126″E
- Operator: Technické služby Opava, s.r.o.
- Capacity: 5,500

Construction
- Built: 1953
- Opened: 1956
- Renovated: 2000, 2003

Tenant
- HC Slezan Opava

Zimní stadion Opava is an indoor sporting arena located in Opava, Czech Republic. The capacity of the arena is 5,500 people. The arena was built in 1953 and roofed in 1956 as the third arena in Czechoslovakia. It is currently home to the HC Slezan Opava ice hockey team. It was partially reconstructed in 2003.
