= Antalya Sports Hall =

Indoor sporting arena in Antalya, Turkey

- Antalya Spor Salonu
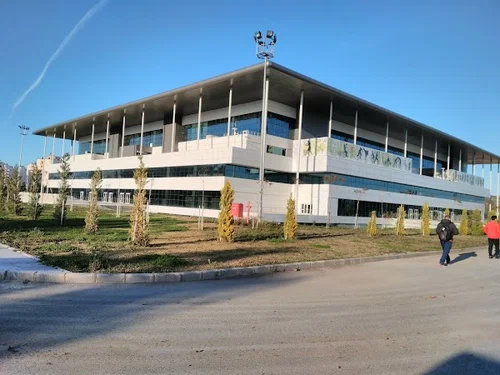
- Interactive map of Antalya Sports Hall
- Location: Antalya, Turkey
- Coordinates: 36.88869°N 30.67322°E
- Capacity: 10,000

Construction
- Groundbreaking: 28 August 2008
- Opened: 23 September 2016

Tenants
- Antalya Büyükşehir Belediyesi; Kepez Belediyespor

The Antalya Sports Hall is an indoor sporting arena located in Antalya, Turkey. Opened in 2016, the arena has a capacity of 10,000 spectators. It replaced the Dilek Sabancı Spor Salonu as the home of Turkish Basketball League clubs, Antalya Büyükşehir Belediyesi and Kepez Belediyespor. It is located next to the Antalya Stadium. It will be used for the 2026 European Women's Handball Championship for the preliminary round.

== See also ==
- List of indoor arenas in Turkey
