= 2014 Gagarin Cup playoffs =

Tournament details
- Dates: March 7–April 30, 2014
- Teams: 16

Final positions
- Champions: Metallurg Magnitogorsk
- Runner-up: HC Lev Praha

Logo for the 2014 Gagarin Cup playoffs

The 2014 Gagarin Cup playoffs of the Kontinental Hockey League (KHL) began on March 7, 2014, after the conclusion of the 2013–14 KHL regular season. The 2013 Gagarin Cup Finals were held in April.

== Playoff seeds ==
After the regular season, the standard 16 teams qualified for the playoffs. The Dynamo Moscow became the Western Conference regular season champions and Continental Cup winners with 115 points. The Metallurg Magnitogorsk were the Eastern Conference regular season champions, finishing the season with 104 points. Admiral Vladivostok and HC Donbass both made the playoffs for the first time in franchise history.

== Draw ==
The playoffs started on 7 March 2014, with the top eight teams from each of the conferences, and will end no later than on 30 April with the last game of the Gagarin Cup final.

During the first three rounds home ice is determined by seeding number within the Conference, not position on the bracket. In the Finals the team with better seeding number has home ice advantage. If the seeding numbers are equal, the regular season record is taken into account.

Conference Quarterfinals	Conference Semifinals
1	(Russia) Metallurg Mg	4
8	(Russia) Admiral	1
1	(Russia) Metallurg Mg	4
6	(Russia) Sibir	0
2	(Kazakhstan) Barys	4
7	(Russia) Avtomobilist	0
Eastern Conference
3	(Russia) Ak Bars	2
6	(Russia) Sibir	4
2	(Kazakhstan) Barys	2
4	(Russia) Salavat Yulaev	4
4	(Russia) Salavat Yulaev	4
5	(Russia) Torpedo	3
1	(Russia) Dynamo Msk	3
8	(Russia) Lokomotiv	4
2	(Russia) SKA	2
8	(Russia) Lokomotiv	4
2	(Russia) SKA	4
7	(Russia) CSKA	0
Western Conference
3	(Czech Republic) Lev	4
6	(Croatia) Medveščak	0
3	(Czech Republic) Lev	4
4	(Ukraine) Donbass	2
4	(Ukraine) Donbass	4
5	(Latvia) Dinamo Rg	3

Conference Finals
1	(Russia) Metallurg Mg	4
4	(Russia) Salavat Yulaev	1
3	(Czech Republic) Lev	4
8	(Russia) Lokomotiv	1

Gagarin Cup Finals
1	(Russia) Metallurg Mg	4
3	(Czech Republic) Lev	3
