= Arena Brno =

Multi-purpose sports and performance venue in the Czech Republic

T-Mobile Arena
- T ARENA

- Interactive map of T-Mobile Arena
- Former names: ARENA BRNO
- Location: Brno Exhibition Centre, Pisárky, Brno, Czech Republic
- Coordinates: 49.189838°N 16.572011°E
- Owner: City of Brno
- Operator: ARENA BRUNO, a.s.
- Capacity: 13,300 (maximum); 12,714 (ice hockey)

Construction
- Groundbreaking: 18 September 2023
- Opened: December 2026 (planned)
- Architects: A PLUS a.s. Arch.Design

Tenant
- HC Kometa Brno

Arena Brno, stylised as ARENA BRNO and known as T-Mobile Arena or T ARENA for sponsorship reasons, is a multi-purpose indoor sports venue in the Pisárky district in Brno, Czech Republic, on the Brno Exhibition Centre site.

Construction began in September 2023 and was completed with a handover from the construction firm to the City of Brno on 25 October 2026, with a grand opening scheduled for January 2027.

The arena is designed to have a maximum capacity of 13,300, reduced to 12,714 for ice hockey games. The ice hockey club HC Kometa Brno will be a main tenant. At the time of completion, the venue was the second largest hockey arena in the Czech Republic.

The first planned event at the arena is the 2026 European Women's Handball Championship in December 2026,, followed by a grand opening concert on 8 January 2027, featuring Jelen and Adam Ďurica.

== See also ==
- List of indoor arenas in the Czech Republic
- Winning Group Arena
