= 2026 European Women's Handball Championship =

2026 EHF European Women's Handball Championship
Mistrovství Evropy v házené žen 2026 (in Czech) Mistrzostwa Europy w Piłce Ręcznej Kobiet 2026 (in Polish) Campionatul European de Handbal Feminin din 2026 (in Romanian) Majstrovstvá Európy v hádzanej žien 2026 (in Slovak) 2026 Avrupa Kadınlar Hentbol Şampiyonası (in Turkish)
- Be Here

Tournament details
- Host countries: Czech Republic; Poland; Romania; Slovakia; Turkey
- Venues: 6 (in 6 host cities)
- Dates: 3–20 December
- Teams: 24 (from 1 confederation)

The 2026 EHF European Women's Handball Championship, commonly referred to as the EHF Euro 2026, will be the 17th edition of the EHF European Women's Handball Championship, the biennial international women's handball championship of Europe organized by EHF. The tournament will be held from 3 to 20 December 2026.

The championship was originally scheduled to be held in Russia, who were stripped of their hosting rights due to the invasion of Ukraine. On 8 March 2024, it was announced that all five applicants, Czech Republic, Poland, Romania, Slovakia and Turkey will co-host the tournament, marking the first time the event was staged in more than three countries. The final will be held in Katowice, Poland.

24 teams will participate for the second time. Qualification took place in March 2024 to April 2025 to decide the qualifiers. The five co-hosts qualified automatically, alongside the top three from 2024, Norway, Denmark and Hungary. Greece will make their debut.

This tournament will act as a qualifier for the 2027 World Women's Handball Championship in Hungary and 2028 EHF Euro edition in Denmark, Norway and Sweden.

Norway are the defending champions, having beaten Denmark in the 2024 final in Vienna.

== Bid process ==
=== Bids ===
On 11 May 2021 it was announced that the following nations sent in an official expression of interest:

- Russia
- Denmark, Norway & Sweden (withdrew)

On 20 October the final bids were presented. The Scandinavian bid was withdrawn, leaving Russia unopposed.

- Russia

As only the Russian bid remained it was unanimously selected at the 14th EHF Extraordinary Congress on 20 November 2021.

=== Second bidding process ===
On 4 July 2023, the EHF confirmed that Russia would not host the event due to the war in Ukraine, and thus reopened the bidding process. On 25 October, the EHF announced the official bids.

- Czech Republic and Poland
- Romania and Slovakia
- Turkey

The hosts were originally going to be announced on 28 January 2024 in Cologne, but the EHF decided to delay the announcement to April while also inviting every bidding nation to a meeting in mid-February.

During the meeting in mid-February, Romanian media reported that a possible five-country co-hosting plan was being negotiated by all five bidding countries and the EHF after it was reported that none of the three bids fulfilled all the requirements.

On 8 March 2024, the EHF announced all five countries, Czech Republic, Poland, Romania, Slovakia and Turkey, as co-hosts. This marks the second time a European championship has been held in more than four countries, after UEFA Euro 2020.

== Preparations ==
=== EHF ===
- Each nation signed the contracts in Katowice, Poland in May 2024.
- Throughout February and March 2025, site visits took place in every city except Brno took place. As the new arena in Brno hadn't been built yet, a separate site visit, which includes also a meeting with the architect, was held.

=== Czech Republic ===
- On 24 April 2024, president of the Czech Handball Association, Ondřej Zdráhala, had affirmed that if Arena Brno wasn't built in time, the Winning Group Arena would be their backup venue.

=== Poland ===
- On 2 February 2026, Polish representatives attended an EHF conference.

=== Romania ===
- In July 2024, the EHF observed Romania's venues,
- On 26 October 2024, the mayor of Cluj-Napoca, Emil Boc, met with Romanian Handball Federation president, Constantin Din to discuss how to promote the tournament.

=== Slovakia ===
- On 4 December 2025, head of the organising committee, Ivan Sabovik stated that the budget is 1.5 million Euros. They will organise numerous activities in preparation for the tournament and want to show Slovakia and Bratislava in the best light. The president of the Slovak Handball Federation, Jaroslas Holeša, had stated that he was originally worried about the five countries hosting but the organisation of the competition has been great.

=== Turkey ===
- Turkish Handball Federation president, Uğur Kılıç, signed the host contract in May 2024.

=== Tickets ===
- On 3 December 2025, tickets were first released with group and venue packages being put on sale.

== Venues ==
Six venues will be used for the tournament. Each country will use one arena with the exception being Romania who will use two in Cluj-Napoca and Oradea. While none of these arenas have hosted the championship, the Spodek in Katowice and Tipos Arena in Bratislava have experience organising the men's edition.

=== Overview of venues ===
- In Czech Republic, Arena Brno is a newly built arena that will host the Czech's portion of the tournament. The venue broke ground in September 2023. This will be the first major tournament held in this arena.
- In Poland, the Spodek will be the Poles' venue. Built in 1971 but renovated in 2011, the facility has hosted numerous high-profile championships: 2009 and EuroBasket 2025, 2014 and 2022 FIVB Volleyball Men's World Championship. Handball-wise, the 2016 European Men's Handball Championship and 2023 World Men's Handball Championship was hosted at the arena.
- The BTarena in Cluj-Napoca will organise matches. The venue was built in 2014 but expanded in preparation for EuroBasket 2017. Romania's largest arena would later host the 2021 Women's European Volleyball Championship and 2026 Men's European Volleyball Championship. Basketball team, U-BT Cluj-Napoca, plays their home games here.
- The Oradea Arena is Romania's second arena for the tournament. With 5,300 seats, it is the smallest arena for the competition. Opened in 2022, this will be the arena's first major tournament hosting.
- In Slovakia, the nation's biggest arena, Tipos Arena, in the country's capital, Bratislava, will hold the games. Since its construction in 1940, the following sports have held major championships at this arena: Basketball, Figure skating, Floorball, Ice hockey, Volleyball. The 2022 European Men's Handball Championship is the only previous time a handball tournament has been in Slovakia.
- In Turkey, the Antalya Sports Hall was used for matches at this tournament. This will be the first major national team tournament held in the arena in any sport, but the venue hosted the 2022 FIVB Women's Volleyball Club World Championship, alongside rounds of the Men's and FIVB Women's Volleyball Nations League in 2023 and 2024.

Brno	2026 European Women's Handball Championship is located in Europe	Katowice
Arena Brno	2026 European Women's Handball Championship is located in Europe	Spodek
Capacity: 13,300	2026 European Women's Handball Championship is located in Europe	Capacity: 11,036
Bratislava	2026 European Women's Handball Championship is located in Europe	Antalya
Tipos Arena	2026 European Women's Handball Championship is located in Europe	Antalya Sports Hall
Capacity: 10,055	2026 European Women's Handball Championship is located in Europe	Capacity: 10,000
Cluj-Napoca	2026 European Women's Handball Championship is located in Europe	Oradea
BTarena	2026 European Women's Handball Championship is located in Europe	Oradea Arena
Capacity: 10,000	2026 European Women's Handball Championship is located in Europe	Capacity: 5,300
	Katowice will host preliminary round, main round and knockout stage. Cluj-Napoca will host preliminary round and main round. Brno, Bratislava, Oradea and Antalya will host preliminary round only.	

Tournament venues information
Venue	Rounds	Games
(Poland) Spodek	Group E, Main round II, Semifinals and Final	19
(Romania) BTarena	Group B and Main round Group I	15
(Romania) Oradea Arena	Group A	6
(Turkey) Antalya Sports Hall	Group C	6
(Czech Republic) Arena Brno	Group D	6
(Slovakia) Tipos Arena	Group F	6

== Qualification ==
Map of qualifiers for the 2026 European Women's Handball Championship: Team qualified for Women's EHF Euro 2026 Team failed to qualify Team banned from competition Did not enter

30 teams registered for participation and competed for 16 places at the final tournament. After the preliminary round, the teams were drawn into six groups of four. The top-two placed teams in each group qualified for the final tournament, alongside the four best-ranked third-placed teams, not counting the matches against fourth-placed teams. The qualifiers draw took place on 20 March 2025 in Cluj-Napoca, Romania. Qualification started in March 2024 and ended in April 2025.

Of the 24 qualified teams, 23 were present in the previous edition. Greece will make their debut, replacing Portugal, who failed to qualify after their sporadic appearance in 2024.

Austria qualified on merit for the first time since 2008.

North Macedonia made their third consecutive appearance at the Euro for the first time ever.

=== Qualified teams ===
Team	Qualification method	Date of qualification	Appearance(s)				Previous best performance (Note: Bold text indicates they hosted that edition.)	Rank
Team	Qualification method	Date of qualification	Total	First	Last	Streak	Previous best performance	Rank
Czech Republic	Co-hosts	8 March 2024	9th	1994	2024	2	Eighth place (1994, 2002)	TBD
Poland	Co-hosts	8 March 2024	10th	1996	2024	7	Fifth place (1998)	TBD
Romania	Co-hosts	8 March 2024	16th	1994	2024	10	Third place (2010)	TBD
Slovakia	Co-hosts	8 March 2024	4th	1994	2024	2	Twelfth place (1994, 2014)	TBD
Turkey	Co-hosts	8 March 2024	2nd	2024	2024	2	Twentieth place (2024)	TBD
Denmark	Top three at 2024 edition	13 December 2024	17th	1994	2024	17	Champions (1994, 1996, 2002)	TBD
Norway	Top three at 2024 edition	13 December 2024	17th	1994	2024	17	Champions (Ten times) (Note: Norway have won in 1998, 2004, 2006, 2008, 2010, 2014, 2016, 2020, 2022 and 2024.)	TBD
Hungary	Top three at 2024 edition	15 December 2024	17th	1994	2024	17	Champions (2000)	TBD
Sweden	Group 5 top two	7 March 2026	15th	1994	2024	13	Runners-up (2010)	TBD
Spain	Group 6 top two	7 March 2026	15th	1998	2024	13	Runners-up (2008, 2014)	TBD
Netherlands	Group 2 top two	8 March 2026	11th	1994	2024	7	Runners-up (2016)	TBD
Germany	Group 3 top two	8 March 2026	17th	1994	2024	17	Runners-up (1994)	TBD
France	Group 1 top two	8 March 2026	14th	2000	2024	14	Champions (2018)	TBD
Slovenia	Group 3 top two	8 April 2026	10th	2002	2024	6	Eighth place (2022)	TBD
Croatia	Group 1 top two	9 April 2026	14th	1994	2024	12	Third place (2020)	TBD
Switzerland	Group 2 top two	9 April 2026	3rd	2022	2024	3	Twelfth place (2024)	TBD
Montenegro	Group 4 top two	9 April 2026	9th	2010	2024	9	Champions (2012)	TBD
Faroe Islands	Group 4 top two	9 April 2026	2nd	2024	2024	2	Seventeenth place (2024)	TBD
Austria	Group 6 top two	12 April 2026	10th	1994	2024	2	Third place (1996)	TBD
Serbia	Group 5 top two	12 April 2026	11th	2006	2024	11	Fourth place (2012)	TBD
Greece	Four best third place teams	12 April 2026	1st	Debut				TBD
Iceland	Four best third place teams	12 April 2026	4th	2010	2024	2	Fiftheenth place (2010, 2012)	TBD
North Macedonia	Four best third place teams	12 April 2026	8th	1998	2024	3	Seventh place (2008)	TBD
Ukraine	Four best third place teams	12 April 2026	12th	1994	2024	2	Runners-up (2000)	TBD

== Draw ==
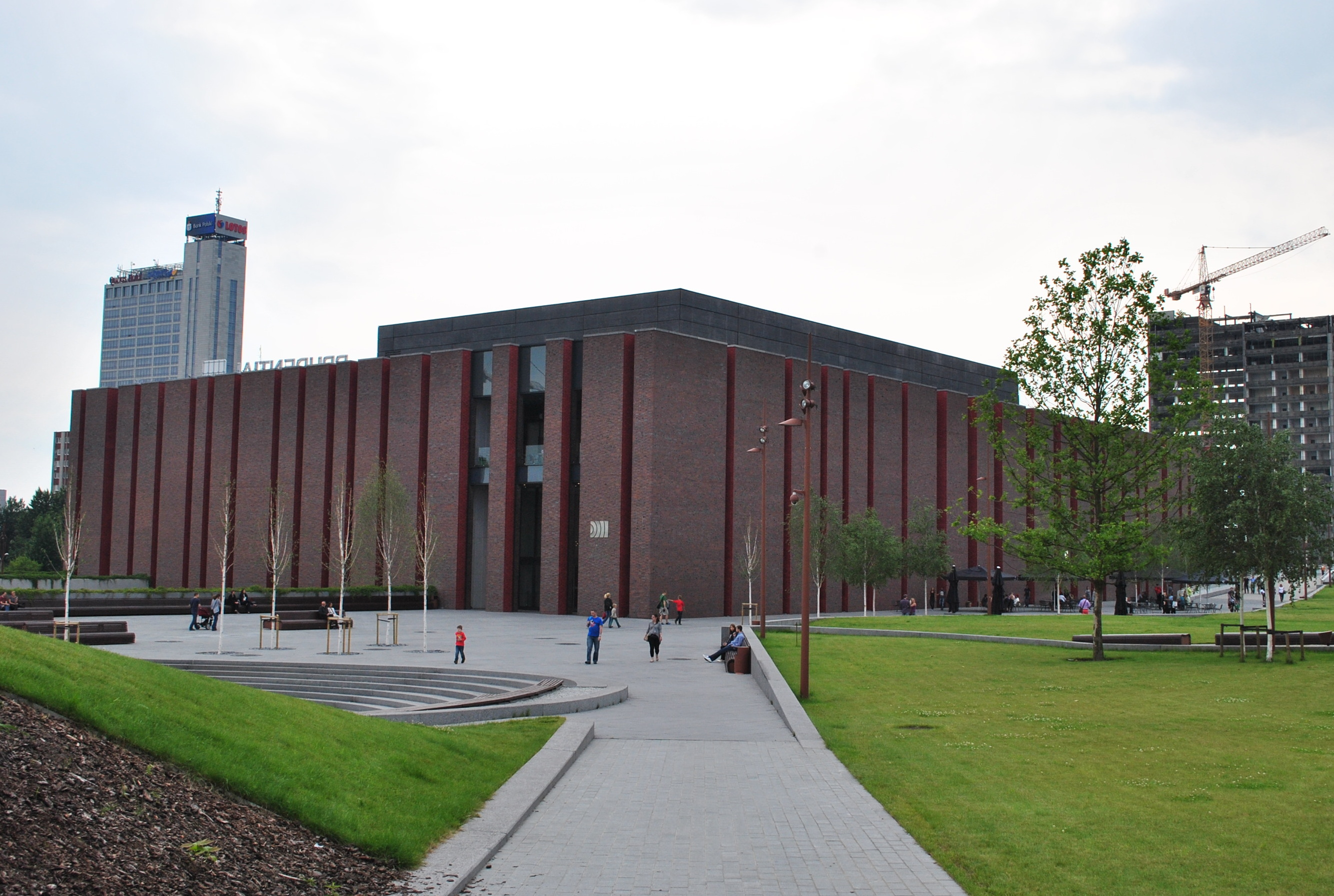
The Polish National Radio Symphony Orchestra in Katowice hosted the draw.

The draw was originally going to take place on 16 May 2026, but was brought forward to 16 April 2026 at 18:00 CEST at the Polish National Radio Symphony Orchestra in Katowice, Poland. The draw was hosted by Polish sports journalist, Piotr Sobczyński. Czech player, Silvie Polášková, Polish international Katarzyna Cygan, Slovak national team player, Barbora Lancz and Turkish player Elif Sıla Aydın were the guests and assisted with the draw. The draw started with, in order, pots 2, 3, 1 and 4 being drawn. Each selected teams' group would then get decided by another pot.

=== Chosen teams ===
As early as February 2024, Hungary was reported to be the only team that was not a co-host to be pre-drawn into a group, being drawn into group in Oradea, likely due to its proximity to the Hungarian border. The co-hosts were all seeded into their home groups.

- 2026 European Women's Handball Championship – Draw
- Draw Live Stream

Team	Group
Hungary	A
Romania	B
Turkey	C
Czech Republic	D
Poland	E
Slovakia	F

=== Seeding ===
The seedings were announced on 13 April 2026. The teams were seeded based on the results of the 2026 qualifiers and the final rankings of the 2024 European Women's Handball Championship.

Pot 1	Pot 2	Pot 3	Pot 4
Norway; Denmark; Hungary; France; Sweden; Netherlands	Germany; Montenegro; Poland (H); Romania (H); Spain; Czech Republic (H)	Turkey (H); Slovakia (H); Slovenia; Switzerland; Austria; Faroe Islands	Croatia; Serbia; Iceland; North Macedonia; Ukraine; Greece

=== Draw results ===
Group A in Oradea
Pos	Team
A1	Hungary
A2	Montenegro
A3	Slovenia
A4	Iceland

Group B in Cluj-Napoca
Pos	Team
B1	Norway
B2	Romania (H)
B3	Switzerland
B4	North Macedonia

Group C in Antalya
Pos	Team
C1	Denmark
C2	Spain
C3	Turkey (H)
C4	Greece

Group D in Brno
Pos	Team
D1	Netherlands
D2	Czech Republic (H)
D3	Austria
D4	Croatia

Group E in Katowice
Pos	Team
E1	France
E2	Poland (H)
E3	Faroe Islands
E4	Ukraine

Group F in Bratislava
Pos	Team
F1	Sweden
F2	Germany
F3	Slovakia (H)
F4	Serbia

=== Schedule ===
Schedule
Round	Matchday	Date
Preliminary round	Matchday 1	3–5 December 2026
Preliminary round	Matchday 2	5–7 December 2026
Preliminary round	Matchday 3	7–9 December 2026
Main round	Matchday 4	10–11 December 2026
Main round	Matchday 5	12–13 December 2026
Main round	Matchday 6	14–15 December 2026
Main round	Matchday 7	15–16 December 2026
Knockout stage	Semi-finals; Fifth place	18 December 2026
Knockout stage	Final; Third place	20 December 2026

== Referees ==
16 referee pairs were selected on 3 July 2026.

Referees
Bosnia and Herzegovina	Vesna Balvan; Tatjana Praštalo
France	Titouan Picard; Pierre Vauchez
Germany	Ramesh Thiyagarajah; Suresh Thiyagarajah
Hungary	Zsófia Marton; Rita Dáné
Italy/Romania	Andrea Pepe; Simona Stancu
Lithuania	Tomas Barysas; Povilas Petrušis
Moldova	Igor Covalciuc; Alexei Covalciuc
North Macedonia	Danielo Bozhinovski; Viktor Nachevski

Referees
Netherlands	William Weijmans; Rick Wolbertus
Norway	Mads Fremstad; Jørgen Jørstad
Poland	Małgorzata Lidacka; Urszula Lesiak
Portugal	Daniel Martins; Roberto Martins
Romania	Georgiana Murariu; Mihaela Chiruță
Serbia	Vanja Antić; Jelena Jakovljević
Slovakia	Barbora Bočáková; Lucia Jánošíková
Slovenia	Ozren Backović; Mirko Palačković

== Preliminary round ==
All times are UTC+1.

=== Tiebreakers ===
In the group stages (preliminary and main rounds), teams are ranked according to points (2 points for a win, 1 point for a draw, 0 points for a loss). If two or more teams have the same number of points, the ranking will be determined as follows:

During the round matches

1. Superior goal difference from all group matches;
2. Higher number of goals scored in all group matches;
3. Alphabetical order.

After completion of the round matches

1. Highest number of points in matches between the teams directly involved;
2. Superior goal difference in matches between the teams directly involved;
3. Highest number of goals scored in matches between the teams directly involved;
4. Superior goal difference in all matches of the group;
5. Highest number of plus goals in all matches of the group;

If the ranking of one of these teams is determined, the above criteria are consecutively followed until the ranking of all teams is determined. If no ranking can be determined, a decision shall be obtained by EHF through drawing of lots.

=== Group A ===
Pos	Team	Pld	W	D	L	GF	GA	GD	Pts	Qualification
1	Hungary	0	0	0	0	0	0	0	0	Main round
2	Montenegro	0	0	0	0	0	0	0	0	Main round
3	Slovenia	0	0	0	0	0	0	0	0	
4	Iceland	0	0	0	0	0	0	0	0	

First match(es) will be played: 3 December 2026. Source: EHF
Rules for classification: 1) points; 2) head-to-head points; 3) head-to-head goal difference; 4) head-to-head number of goals scored; 5) goal difference.

3 December 2026; 17:30	Slovenia	v	Iceland	Oradea Arena, Oradea
3 December 2026; 17:30		Report		Oradea Arena, Oradea

3 December 2026; 20:00	Hungary	v	Montenegro	Oradea Arena, Oradea
3 December 2026; 20:00		Report		Oradea Arena, Oradea

5 December 2026; 17:30	Montenegro	v	Iceland	Oradea Arena, Oradea
5 December 2026; 17:30		Report		Oradea Arena, Oradea

5 December 2026; 20:00	Hungary	v	Slovenia	Oradea Arena, Oradea
5 December 2026; 20:00		Report		Oradea Arena, Oradea

7 December 2026; 17:30	Slovenia	v	Montenegro	Oradea Arena, Oradea
7 December 2026; 17:30		Report		Oradea Arena, Oradea

7 December 2026; 20:00	Iceland	v	Hungary	Oradea Arena, Oradea
7 December 2026; 20:00		Report		Oradea Arena, Oradea

=== Group B ===
Pos	Team	Pld	W	D	L	GF	GA	GD	Pts	Qualification
1	Norway	0	0	0	0	0	0	0	0	Main round
2	Romania (H)	0	0	0	0	0	0	0	0	Main round
3	Switzerland	0	0	0	0	0	0	0	0	
4	North Macedonia	0	0	0	0	0	0	0	0	

First match(es) will be played: 4 December 2026. Source: EHF
Rules for classification: 1) points; 2) head-to-head points; 3) head-to-head goal difference; 4) head-to-head number of goals scored; 5) goal difference.
(H) Hosts

4 December 2026; 17:30	Switzerland	v	North Macedonia	BTarena, Cluj-Napoca
4 December 2026; 17:30		Report		BTarena, Cluj-Napoca

4 December 2026; 20:00	Norway	v	Romania	BTarena, Cluj-Napoca
4 December 2026; 20:00		Report		BTarena, Cluj-Napoca

6 December 2026; 17:30	Romania	v	North Macedonia	BTarena, Cluj-Napoca
6 December 2026; 17:30		Report		BTarena, Cluj-Napoca

6 December 2026; 20:00	Norway	v	Switzerland	BTarena, Cluj-Napoca
6 December 2026; 20:00		Report		BTarena, Cluj-Napoca

8 December 2026; 17:30	Switzerland	v	Romania	BTarena, Cluj-Napoca
8 December 2026; 17:30		Report		BTarena, Cluj-Napoca

8 December 2026; 20:00	North Macedonia	v	Norway	BTarena, Cluj-Napoca
8 December 2026; 20:00		Report		BTarena, Cluj-Napoca

=== Group C ===
Pos	Team	Pld	W	D	L	GF	GA	GD	Pts	Qualification
1	Denmark	0	0	0	0	0	0	0	0	Main round
2	Spain	0	0	0	0	0	0	0	0	Main round
3	Turkey (H)	0	0	0	0	0	0	0	0	
4	Greece	0	0	0	0	0	0	0	0	

First match(es) will be played: 3 December 2026. Source: EHF
Rules for classification: 1) points; 2) head-to-head points; 3) head-to-head goal difference; 4) head-to-head number of goals scored; 5) goal difference.
(H) Hosts

3 December 2026; 16:30	Turkey	v	Greece	Antalya Sports Hall, Antalya
3 December 2026; 16:30		Report		Antalya Sports Hall, Antalya

3 December 2026; 19:00	Denmark	v	Spain	Antalya Sports Hall, Antalya
3 December 2026; 19:00		Report		Antalya Sports Hall, Antalya

5 December 2026; 16:30	Spain	v	Greece	Antalya Sports Hall, Antalya
5 December 2026; 16:30		Report		Antalya Sports Hall, Antalya

5 December 2026; 19:00	Denmark	v	Turkey	Antalya Sports Hall, Antalya
5 December 2026; 19:00		Report		Antalya Sports Hall, Antalya

7 December 2026; 16:30	Turkey	v	Spain	Antalya Sports Hall, Antalya
7 December 2026; 16:30		Report		Antalya Sports Hall, Antalya

7 December 2026; 19:00	Greece	v	Denmark	Antalya Sports Hall, Antalya
7 December 2026; 19:00		Report		Antalya Sports Hall, Antalya

=== Group D ===
Pos	Team	Pld	W	D	L	GF	GA	GD	Pts	Qualification
1	Netherlands	0	0	0	0	0	0	0	0	Main round
2	Czech Republic (H)	0	0	0	0	0	0	0	0	Main round
3	Austria	0	0	0	0	0	0	0	0	
4	Croatia	0	0	0	0	0	0	0	0	

First match(es) will be played: 4 December 2026. Source: EHF
Rules for classification: 1) points; 2) head-to-head points; 3) head-to-head goal difference; 4) head-to-head number of goals scored; 5) goal difference.
(H) Hosts

4 December 2026; 18:00	Austria	v	Croatia	Arena Brno, Brno
4 December 2026; 18:00		Report		Arena Brno, Brno

4 December 2026; 20:30	Netherlands	v	Czech Republic	Arena Brno, Brno
4 December 2026; 20:30		Report		Arena Brno, Brno

6 December 2026; 18:00	Czech Republic	v	Croatia	Arena Brno, Brno
6 December 2026; 18:00		Report		Arena Brno, Brno

6 December 2026; 20:30	Netherlands	v	Austria	Arena Brno, Brno
6 December 2026; 20:30		Report		Arena Brno, Brno

8 December 2026; 18:00	Austria	v	Czech Republic	Arena Brno, Brno
8 December 2026; 18:00		Report		Arena Brno, Brno

8 December 2026; 20:30	Croatia	v	Netherlands	Arena Brno, Brno
8 December 2026; 20:30		Report		Arena Brno, Brno

=== Group E ===
Pos	Team	Pld	W	D	L	GF	GA	GD	Pts	Qualification
1	France	0	0	0	0	0	0	0	0	Main round
2	Poland (H)	0	0	0	0	0	0	0	0	Main round
3	Faroe Islands	0	0	0	0	0	0	0	0	
4	Ukraine	0	0	0	0	0	0	0	0	

First match(es) will be played: 5 December 2026. Source: EHF
Rules for classification: 1) points; 2) head-to-head points; 3) head-to-head goal difference; 4) head-to-head number of goals scored; 5) goal difference.
(H) Hosts

5 December 2026; 18:00	France	v	Poland	Spodek, Katowice
5 December 2026; 18:00		Report		Spodek, Katowice

5 December 2026; 20:30	Faroe Islands	v	Ukraine	Spodek, Katowice
5 December 2026; 20:30		Report		Spodek, Katowice

7 December 2026; 18:00	Poland	v	Ukraine	Spodek, Katowice
7 December 2026; 18:00		Report		Spodek, Katowice

7 December 2026; 20:30	France	v	Faroe Islands	Spodek, Katowice
7 December 2026; 20:30		Report		Spodek, Katowice

9 December 2026; 18:00	Faroe Islands	v	Poland	Spodek, Katowice
9 December 2026; 18:00		Report		Spodek, Katowice

9 December 2026; 20:30	Ukraine	v	France	Spodek, Katowice
9 December 2026; 20:30		Report		Spodek, Katowice

=== Group F ===
Pos	Team	Pld	W	D	L	GF	GA	GD	Pts	Qualification
1	Sweden	0	0	0	0	0	0	0	0	Main round
2	Germany	0	0	0	0	0	0	0	0	Main round
3	Slovakia (H)	0	0	0	0	0	0	0	0	
4	Serbia	0	0	0	0	0	0	0	0	

First match(es) will be played: 4 December 2026. Source: EHF
Rules for classification: 1) points; 2) head-to-head points; 3) head-to-head goal difference; 4) head-to-head number of goals scored; 5) goal difference.
(H) Hosts

4 December 2026; 18:00	Sweden	v	Germany	Tipos aréna, Bratislava
4 December 2026; 18:00		Report		Tipos aréna, Bratislava

4 December 2026; 20:30	Slovakia	v	Serbia	Tipos aréna, Bratislava
4 December 2026; 20:30		Report		Tipos aréna, Bratislava

6 December 2026; 18:00	Germany	v	Serbia	Tipos aréna, Bratislava
6 December 2026; 18:00		Report		Tipos aréna, Bratislava

6 December 2026; 20:30	Sweden	v	Slovakia	Tipos aréna, Bratislava
6 December 2026; 20:30		Report		Tipos aréna, Bratislava

8 December 2026; 18:00	Slovakia	v	Germany	Tipos aréna, Bratislava
8 December 2026; 18:00		Report		Tipos aréna, Bratislava

8 December 2026; 20:30	Serbia	v	Sweden	Tipos aréna, Bratislava
8 December 2026; 20:30		Report		Tipos aréna, Bratislava

== Main round ==
Points and goals gained in the preliminary group against teams that advance will be transferred to the main round.

=== Group I ===
Pos	Team	Pld	W	D	L	GF	GA	GD	Pts	Qualification
1	A1	0	0	0	0	0	0	0	0	Semifinals
2	B1	0	0	0	0	0	0	0	0	Semifinals
3	C1	0	0	0	0	0	0	0	0	Fifth place game
4	A2	0	0	0	0	0	0	0	0	
5	B2	0	0	0	0	0	0	0	0	
6	C2	0	0	0	0	0	0	0	0	

First match(es) will be played: 10 December 2026. Source: EHF
Rules for classification: 1) points; 2) head-to-head points; 3) head-to-head goal difference; 4) head-to-head number of goals scored; 5) goal difference.

10 December 2026	C1	v	B2	BTarena, Cluj-Napoca

10 December 2026	A2	v	C2	BTarena, Cluj-Napoca

10 December 2026	A1	v	B1	BTarena, Cluj-Napoca

12 December 2026	C1	v	B1	BTarena, Cluj-Napoca

12 December 2026	A1	v	C2	BTarena, Cluj-Napoca

12 December 2026	A2	v	B2	BTarena, Cluj-Napoca

14 December 2026	A1	v	B2	BTarena, Cluj-Napoca

14 December 2026	A2	v	C1	BTarena, Cluj-Napoca

14 December 2026	B1	v	C2	BTarena, Cluj-Napoca

15 December 2026	A1	v	C1	BTarena, Cluj-Napoca

15 December 2026	A2	v	B1	BTarena, Cluj-Napoca

15 December 2026	B2	v	C2	BTarena, Cluj-Napoca

=== Group II ===
Pos	Team	Pld	W	D	L	GF	GA	GD	Pts	Qualification
1	D1	0	0	0	0	0	0	0	0	Semifinals
2	E1	0	0	0	0	0	0	0	0	Semifinals
3	F1	0	0	0	0	0	0	0	0	Fifth place game
4	D2	0	0	0	0	0	0	0	0	
5	E2	0	0	0	0	0	0	0	0	
6	F2	0	0	0	0	0	0	0	0	

First match(es) will be played: 11 December 2026. Source: EHF
Rules for classification: 1) points; 2) head-to-head points; 3) head-to-head goal difference; 4) head-to-head number of goals scored; 5) goal difference.

11 December 2026	F1	v	E2	Spodek, Katowice

11 December 2026	D2	v	F2	Spodek, Katowice

11 December 2026	D1	v	E1	Spodek, Katowice

13 December 2026	F1	v	E1	Spodek, Katowice

13 December 2026	D1	v	F2	Spodek, Katowice

13 December 2026	D2	v	E2	Spodek, Katowice

15 December 2026	D1	v	E2	Spodek, Katowice

15 December 2026	D2	v	F1	Spodek, Katowice

15 December 2026	E1	v	F2	Spodek, Katowice

16 December 2026	D1	v	F1	Spodek, Katowice

16 December 2026	D2	v	E1	Spodek, Katowice

16 December 2026	E2	v	F2	Spodek, Katowice

== Knockout stage ==
=== Bracket ===
Semi-finals
18 December
I1
II2
18 December
II1
I2

Final
20 December
Third place
20 December

=== Semifinals ===
18 December 2026; 17:45	v	Spodek, Katowice

18 December 2026; 20:30	v	Spodek, Katowice

=== Fifth place game ===
18 December 2026; 15:00	I3	v	II3	Spodek, Katowice

=== Third place game ===
20 December 2026; 15:15	LSF1	v	LSF2	Spodek, Katowice

=== Final ===
20 December 2026; 18:00	WSF1	v	WSF2	Spodek, Katowice

== Rankings ==
=== Final ranking ===
The teams ranked fourth in each group after the completion of the preliminary round matches will be ranked 19 to 24, while teams ranked third in each group after the completion of the preliminary round matches will be ranked 13 to 18 according to the number of points won in the preliminary round. Places seven or eight will be attributed to the two teams ranked fourth in the main round groups, places nine and ten to the two teams ranked fifth in the main round groups, places eleven and twelve to the two teams ranked sixth in the main round groups according to the number of points won by the respective teams after completion of the main round matches. Places one to six will be decided by play–off or knock–out.

Pos	Team	Pld	W	D	L	GF	GA	GD	Pts	Final result
1	TBD	0	0	0	0	0	0	0	0	Champions
2	TBD	0	0	0	0	0	0	0	0	Runners-up
3	TBD	0	0	0	0	0	0	0	0	Third place
4	TBD	0	0	0	0	0	0	0	0	Fourth place
5	TBD	0	0	0	0	0	0	0	0	Fifth place game
6	TBD	0	0	0	0	0	0	0	0	Fifth place game
7	TBD	0	0	0	0	0	0	0	0	Fourth in main round
8	TBD	0	0	0	0	0	0	0	0	Fourth in main round
9	TBD	0	0	0	0	0	0	0	0	Fifth in main round
10	TBD	0	0	0	0	0	0	0	0	Fifth in main round
11	TBD	0	0	0	0	0	0	0	0	Sixth in main round
12	TBD	0	0	0	0	0	0	0	0	Sixth in main round
13	TBD	0	0	0	0	0	0	0	0	Third in preliminary round
14	TBD	0	0	0	0	0	0	0	0	Third in preliminary round
15	TBD	0	0	0	0	0	0	0	0	Third in preliminary round
16	TBD	0	0	0	0	0	0	0	0	Third in preliminary round
17	TBD	0	0	0	0	0	0	0	0	Third in preliminary round
18	TBD	0	0	0	0	0	0	0	0	Third in preliminary round
19	TBD	0	0	0	0	0	0	0	0	Fourth in preliminary round
20	TBD	0	0	0	0	0	0	0	0	Fourth in preliminary round
21	TBD	0	0	0	0	0	0	0	0	Fourth in preliminary round
22	TBD	0	0	0	0	0	0	0	0	Fourth in preliminary round
23	TBD	0	0	0	0	0	0	0	0	Fourth in preliminary round
24	TBD	0	0	0	0	0	0	0	0	Fourth in preliminary round

Updated to match(es) played on unknown. Source: EHF
Rules for classification: 1) points; 2) head-to-head points; 3) head-to-head goal difference; 4) head-to-head number of goals scored; 5) goal difference.

=== Qualification table ===
Qualified for the 2027 World Championship

Rank	Team
1st place, gold medalist(s)	
2nd place, silver medalist(s)	
3rd place, bronze medalist(s)	
4	
5	
6	
7	
8	
9	
10	
11	
12	
13	
14	
15	
16	
17	
18	
19	
20	
21	
22	
23	
24	
