= Antje Döll =

German handball player (born 1988)

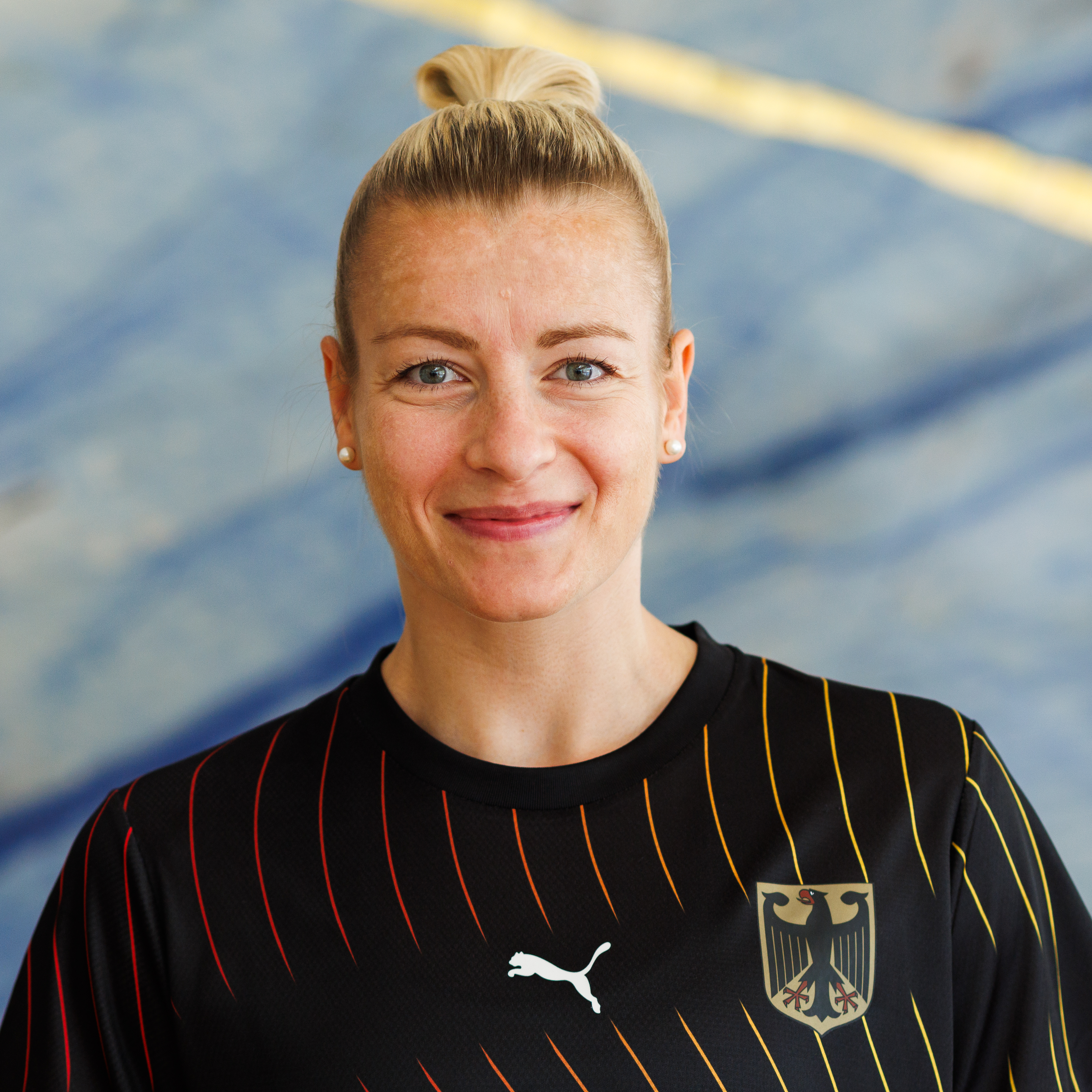
- Antje Döll in 2025

Personal information
- Nationality: German
- Born: 3 October 1988 (age 38) Haldensleben, East Germany
- Height: 1.70 m (5 ft 7 in)

Sport
- Sport: Handball
- Position: Left wing
- Current club: Neckarsulmer SU
- Number: 59

Youth career
- Years: Team
- 1995–2001: MTV Weferlingen

Senior clubs
- Years: Team
- 2001–2006: HSC 2000 Magdeburg
- 2006–2015: HSG Bensheim/Auerbach
- 2015–2024: SG BBM Bietigheim
- 2024–2025: HB Ludwigsburg
- 2025–: Neckarsulmer SU
National team
Years	Team	Apps	(Gls)
2017–	Germany	105	(273)
Medal record
World Championship
Silver medal – second place	2025 Netherlands/Germany
- Updated on 7 November 2025

Antje Döll (née Lauenroth, born 3 October 1988) is a German handballer for Neckarsulmer SU and the German national team.

She represented Germany at the 2025 World Women's Handball Championship. Here Germany reached the final, where they lost to Norway. This was the first time since 1994 that Germany made the final of a major international tournament and the first time they won a medal since 2007. Döll was part of the tournament all-star team. She also scored the third most goals at the tournament (49) behind Cuba's Lorena Téllez (54) and Norway's Henny Reistad (55).

== Achievements ==
- World Championship:
  - Silver : 2025
- Bundesliga:
  - Winner: 2017, 2019, 2022, 2023
- IHF Junior World Championship:
  - Winner: 2008
- EHF European League:
  - Winner: 2022

== Individual awards ==
- All-Star left wing of the IHF World Handball Championship: 2025
