= Claus Mogensen =

Danish handball coach and former player

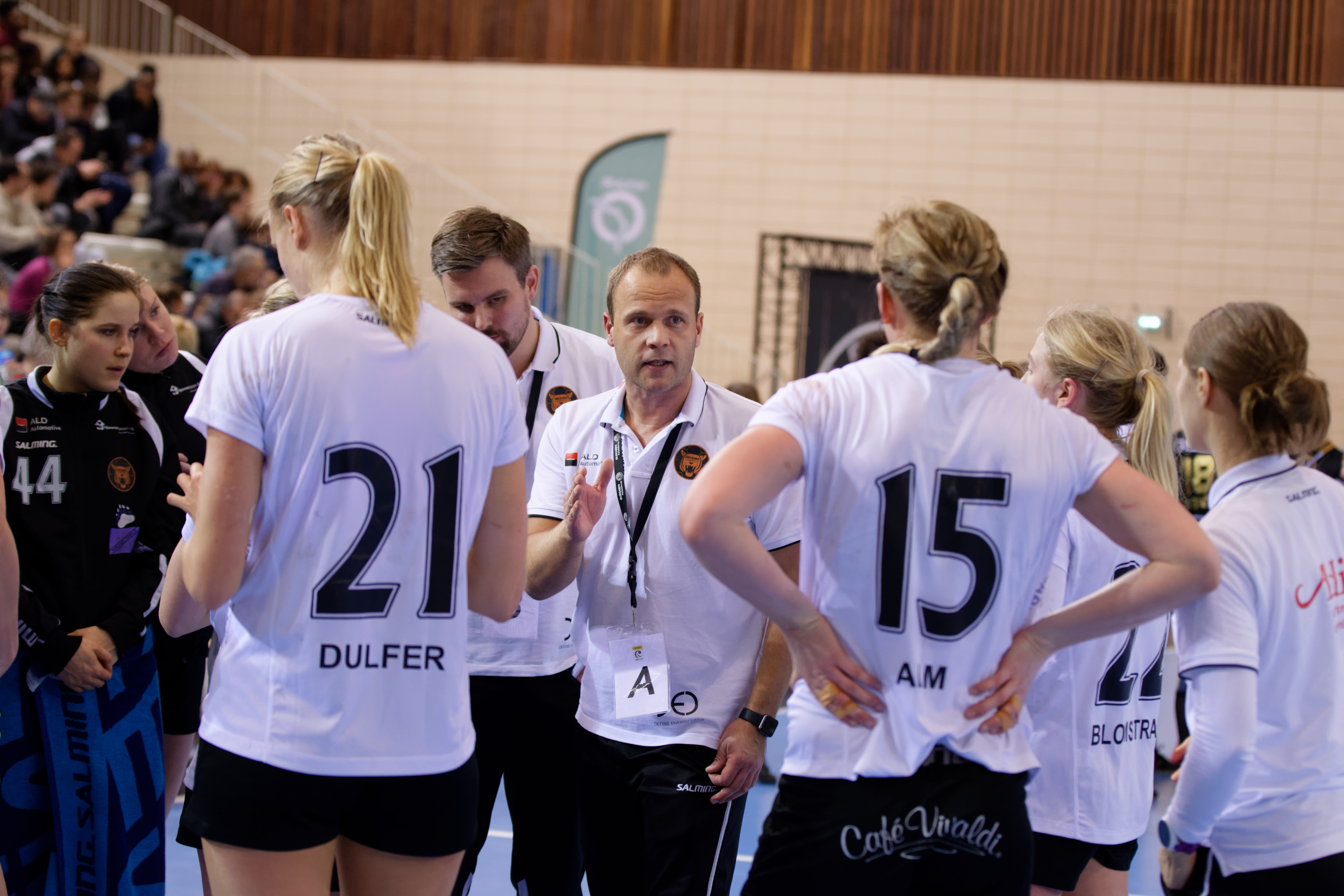
- Jan. 28, 2018

Personal information
- Nationality: Danish
- Born: 18 January 1973 (age 53) Skanderborg, Danmark

Sport
- Sport: Handball
- Position: Coach
- Current club: Ikast Håndbold; Faroe Islands

Teams managed
- Years: Team
- 2008–2010: Horsens HK
- 2010–2011: Skanderborg Håndbold
- 2011–2013: SK Aarhus
- 2013–2016: Byåsen IL
- 2016–2022: København Håndbold
- 2022–2023: Kastamonu GSK
- 2023: SønderjyskE Håndbold (assistant)
- 2023–2024: Horsens
- 2023–: Faroe Islands
- 2025–: Ikast Håndbold

Claus Mogensen (born 18 January 1973) is a Danish handball coach and former handball player, who is the current head coach of Ikast Håndbold and the Faroese women's national handball team.

== Coaching career ==
Mogensen started his coaching career at Horsens HK, where he was from 2008 to 2010. He was then the head coach for SK Aarhus from 2011 to 2013.

From 2013 to 2016 he was the coach of the Norwegian team Byåsen HE. He has won two silver medals with them in the Postenligaen in 2013-14 and 2014-15. In 2016 he was named Coach of the Year in Norwegian handball for these results.

Afterwards he was the head coach at København Håndbold from 2016-2022. In 2016-17 he reached the final of the Danish Championship, where they lost to Nykøbing Falster HK. The same year he was named Danish Women's Coach of the Season. The year after he won the Danish Championship in 2018, which was the first ever for the club.

He then became the coach of Turkish club Kastamonu GSK, where he sign a one year contract. He was however fired already in February 2023 due to poor results in the EHF Champions League. He then returned to Denmark, and became the assistant coach at SønderjyskE Håndbold's men's team for the rest of the season. Only a week later, it was announced that he had signed a contract to become the head coach of HH Elite, the same club he started his career at, which had in the meantime had a new name. He signed a three year contract with the club.

In June 2023 he became the coach of the Faroese women's national handball team as well as the head coach of HH Elite.

He qualified the Faroese national team for the 2024 European Women's Handball Championship in Hungary, Switzerland and Austria, placing 17th overall. This was the first time Faroe Islands participated in a major international tournament. A year later he led the team to the 2025 World Women's Handball Championship, the first ever World Cup for The Faroe Islands. Here they managed wins over Spain and Paraguay, as they advanced from the preliminary groups and recorded their first ever win at a major international tournament.
