= Pernille Brandenborg =

Faroese handball player (born 1997)

Personal information
- Full name: Pernille Brandenborg
- Nationality: Faroese
- Born: 29 July 1997 (age 29) Svendborg, Denmark
- Height: 1.83 m (6 ft 0 in)

Sport
- Sport: Handball
- Position: Pivot
- Current club: CSM București
- Number: 18

Youth career
- Years: Team
- -2017: Svendborg HK

Senior clubs
- Years: Team
- 2017–2018: Gudme HK
- 2017–2021: Vendsyssel Håndbold
- 2021–2022: Randers HK
- 2022–2025: København Håndbold
- 2025–2026: Storhamar HE
- 2026–: CSM București
National team
| Years | Team | Apps | (Gls) |
| 2016– | Faroe Islands | 63 | (175) |

Pernille Brandenborg (born 29 July 1997) is a Faroese-Danish handballer who plays for CSM București and the Faroe Islands women's national team, where she is the captain of the team.

== National team ==
Brandenburg made her debut in the Faroese national team on 2 December 2016, against Macedonia. She then represented the team during the 2022 European Women's Handball Championship qualifying cycle.

She also participated with the Faroese national team at the 2024 European Women's Handball Championship in Hungary, Switzerland and Austria, placing 17th overall. This was the first time ever the Faroe Islands made a major international tournament. At the 2025 World Championship she was part of the Faroe Islands team that played for the first time at a World Championship. With wins over Spain and Paraguay they advanced from the preliminary groups and recorded their first ever win at a major international tournament.

== Career ==
=== Youth ===
She started playing handball at Svendborg HK, before joining Gudme HK at 18. She then joined Vendsyssel Håndbold in the 1st Division, where she played for 3.5 years.

=== Vendsyssel ===
In 2020 she was promoted with Vendsyssel to the top division. In the following season they did however finish last and was relegated again.

=== Randers HK ===
In 2021 she joined league rivals Randers HK. In her first season she was the second choice pivot behind Sidsel Mejlvang. When Mejlvang left the team a year later she became first choice.

=== København Håndbold ===
When Randers HK declared bankruptcy in November 2022, she joined København Håndbold.

In the summer of 2025 she joined Norwegian team Storhamar Håndball. A year later she moved to CSM București.

== Private ==
She grew up in Denmark to a Faroese mother and Danish father. Danish politician Bjørn Brandenborg is her older brother.

== Achievements ==
- Danish 1st Division:
  - Winner: 2019–20
- REMA 1000-ligaen:
  - Silver: 2025/2026
- Norwegian Cup:
  - Winner: 2025
