= Suzanne Wajoka =

French handball player (born 2001)

Personal information
- Full name: Suzanne Wajoka
- Nationality: French
- Born: 2 January 2001 (age 25) Nouméa, New Caledonia
- Height: 1.70 m (5 ft 7 in)

Sport
- Sport: Handball
- Position: Left wing
- Current club: Metz Handball
- Number: 10

Senior clubs
- Years: Team
- 2016–2022: Fleury Loiret HB
- 2023–2025: ESBF Besançon
- 2025–: Metz Handball
National team
Years	Team	Apps	(Gls)
2025–	France	15	(57)
Medal record
World Championship
Bronze medal – third place	2025 Netherlands/Germany
- Updated on 9 January 2026

Suzanne Wajoka (born 2 January 2001) is a French handball player for Metz Handball and the French national team.

On 6 March 2025, she made her first appearance on the French national team as the first New Caledonian born handball player. She also participated at the 2025 World Women's Handball Championship in Germany and Netherlands, winning bronze.

On 13 February 2025, she signed a one-year agreement with French top tier Metz Handball.
