= Faroe Islands women's national handball team =

National handball team of Faroe Islands

Faroe Islands

Information
- Association: Handball Federation of the Faroe Islands
- Coach: Claus Mogensen
- Assistant coach: Simon Olsen
- Captain: Pernille Brandenborg
- Most caps: Pernille Brandenborg (63)
- Most goals: Jana Mittún (199)

Colours
1st	2nd

Results

World Championship
- Appearances: 1 (First in 2025)
- Best result: 17th (2025)

European Championship
- Appearances: 1 (First in 2024)
- Best result: 17th (2024)
- Last updated on 15 December 2025.

The Faroe Islands women's national handball team are the women's team for the Faroe Islands.

In June 2017 the team advanced for the first time from the Qualification Phase 1 to Phase 2 of the European Women's Handball Championship qualification, when they won both matches in their group in the 2018 European Women's Handball Championship qualification which were against Greece and Finland. Faroe Island qualified for the territory's first European Women's Handball Championship in 2024. The same way they qualified for their first World Women's Handball Championship in 2025, making them the smallest natvon to ever qualify. With wins over Spain and Paraguay they advanced from the preliminary groups and recorded their first ever win at a major international tournament.

== Results ==
=== World Championships ===
Year	Position	Pld	W	D	L	GS	GA	+/-
(Norway) 1993	Did not qualify							
(Austria) (Hungary) 1995	Did not qualify							
(Germany) 1997	Did not qualify							
(Denmark) (Norway) 1999	Did not qualify							
(Italy) 2001	Did not qualify							
(France) 2003	Did not qualify							
(Russia) 2005	Did not qualify							
(France) 2007	Did not qualify							
(China) 2009	Did not qualify							
(Brazil) 2011	Did not qualify							
(Serbia) 2013	Did not qualify							
(Denmark) 2015	Did not qualify							
(Germany) 2017	Did not qualify							
(Spain) 2021	Did not qualify							
(Denmark) (Norway) (Sweden) 2023	Did not qualify							
(Germany) (Netherlands) 2025	17th	6	2	1	3	177	182	−5
(Hungary) 2027	TBD							
(Spain) 2029	TBD							
(Czech Republic) (Poland) 2031	TBD							
Total	1/19	6	2	1	3	177	182	−5

=== European Championship ===
Year	Position	Pld	W	D	L	GS	GA	+/-
(Germany) 1994	Did not qualify							
(Denmark) 1996	Did not qualify							
(Netherlands) 1998	Did not qualify							
(Romania) 2000	Did not qualify							
(Denmark) 2002	Did not qualify							
(Hungary) 2004	Did not qualify							
(Sweden) 2006	Did not qualify							
(North Macedonia) 2008	Did not qualify							
(Denmark) (Norway) 2010	Did not qualify							
(Serbia) 2012	Did not qualify							
(Hungary) (Croatia) 2014	Did not qualify							
(Sweden) 2016	Did not qualify							
(France) 2018	Did not qualify							
(Denmark) (Norway) 2020	Did not qualify							
(Slovenia) (North Macedonia) (Montenegro) 2022	Did not qualify							
(Austria) (Hungary) (Switzerland) 2024	17th	3	0	1	2	66	78	−12
(Czech Republic) (Poland) (Romania) (Slovakia) (Turkey) 2026	Qualified							
(Denmark) (Norway) (Sweden) 2028	TBD							
(Belgium) (France) 2030	TBD							
(Denmark) (Germany) (Poland) 2032	TBD							
Total	2/20	–	3	0	1	2	66	78

== Current squad ==
The squad chosen for the 2026 European Women's Handball Championship.

Head coach: Claus Mogensen

No.	Pos.	Name	Date of birth (age)	Height	App.	Goals	Club
1	GK	Annika Fríðheim Petersen	1 June 1999 (age 27)	1.79 m	44	1	(Poland) Enea MKS Gniezno
4	RW	Brynhild Pálsdóttir	5 March 2003 (age 23)	1.75 m	19	26	(Denmark) BK Ydun
5	P	Var Bentsdóttir Zachariasen	11 April 2002 (age 24)	1.80 m	24	5	(Denmark) Ajax København
6	LB	Marita Mortensen	29 March 2001 (age 25)	1.80 m	35	32	(Denmark) NFH
7	RW	Joan Rúnadóttir Johannesen	3 June 2006 (age 20)	1.65 m	2	3	(Iceland) KA Akureyri
8	LW	Rannvá Olsen	22 January 2003 (age 23)	1.70 m	35	67	(Denmark) Ejstrup/Hærvejen
14	P	Agatha Kjærbæk Djurhuus	11 December 2006 (age 19)	1.75 m	2	0	(Iceland) KA Akureyri
17	LB	Lív Bentsdóttir Zachariasen	11 April 2002 (age 24)	1.79 m	29	13	(Denmark) Ajax København
18	P	Pernille Brandenborg (c)	29 June 1997 (age 29)	1.82 m	63	175	(Romania) CSM București
21	CB	Maria Pálsdóttir Nólsoy	19 August 2004 (age 22)	1.77 m	35	99	(Denmark) København Håndbold
22	CB	Ró Reginsdóttir	25 December 2007 (age 18)	1.60 m	2	0	(Faroe Islands) Neistin
25	LW	Christina Turiðardóttir Arge	4 September 2001 (age 25)	1.78 m	2	5	(Denmark) Hadsten Håndbold
44	LW	Anna Elisabeth Halsdóttir Weyhe	30 October 2005 (age 21)	1.69 m	25	57	(Faroe Islands) H71
77	CB	Jana Mittún	24 November 2003 (age 22)	1.76 m	42	199	(Denmark) Viborg HK
88	GK	Rakul Wardum	12 June 2002 (age 24)	1.78 m	42	2	(Denmark) Skanderborg Håndbold
99	LB	Friða Nolsøe Olsen	11 August 2003 (age 23)	1.70 m	6	5	(Denmark) BK Ydun

== See also ==
- Faroe Islands men's national handball team
