= Lorena Téllez =

Cuban handball player (born 1996)

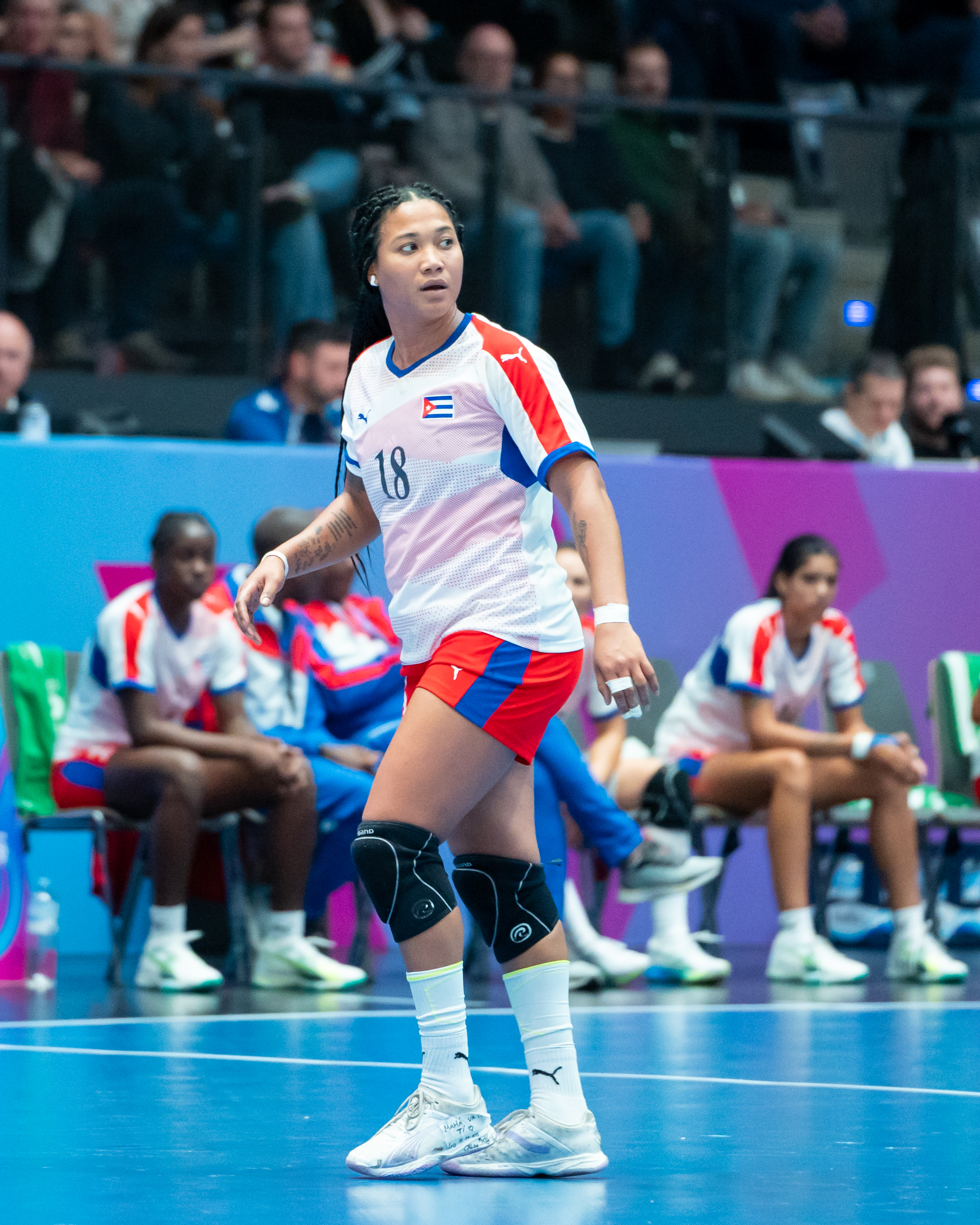

Personal information
- Full name: Lorena Aide Téllez Delgado
- Nationality: Cuban
- Born: 26 November 1996 (age 29)
- Height: 1.82 m (6 ft 0 in)

Sport
- Sport: Handball
- Position: Right wing
- Current club: BM Aula Cultural
National team
Years	Team	Apps	(Gls)
–	Cuba	31	(63)
Medal record
Pan American Games
Bronze medal – third place	2019 Lima	Team
Central American and Caribbean Games
Bronze medal – third place	2018 Barranquilla	Team

Lorena Aide Téllez Delgado (born 26 November 1996) is a Cuban handball player for BM Aula Cultural and the Cuban national team.

She represented Cuba at the 2019 World Women's Handball Championship.

At the 2025 World Women's Handball Championship she scored the second most goals (54) only behind Norway's Henny Reistad (55). Cuba finished in 30th out of 32 teams.
