= 2025 World Women's Handball Championship =

2025 edition of the Women's Handball World Championship

2025 Women's Handball World Championship
Handball-Weltmeisterschaft der Frauen 2025 (in German) Wereldkampioenschap handbal vrouwen 2025 (in Dutch)
- Catch the Dream

Tournament details
- Host countries: Germany; Netherlands
- Venues: 5 (in 5 host cities)
- Dates: 26 November – 14 December
- Teams: 32 (from 5 confederations)

Final positions
- Champions: Norway (5th title)
- Runners-up: Germany
- Third place: France
- Fourth place: Netherlands

Tournament statistics
- Matches played: 108
- Goals scored: 5,959 (55.18 per match)
- Attendance: 353,151 (3,270 per match)
- Top scorers: (Norway) Henny Reistad (55 goals)

Awards
- Best player: (Norway) Henny Reistad

The 2025 IHF Women's Handball World Championship was the 27th edition of the IHF World Women's Handball Championship, the biennial international handball championship organised under the aegis of IHF for the women's national teams across the world. The tournament was held from 26 November to 14 December 2025.

The championship was jointly hosted by Germany and the Netherlands. It was the fourth time in history that the championship was jointly hosted. The final was held in Ahoy Arena.

For the third time, 32 teams took part, following the expansion in 2021. Continental championships acted as qualification, with the exception of Europe, who also use their own qualification process alongside the European Championship. Qualifiers took place between October 2024 and April 2025. Egypt, Faroe Islands and Switzerland made their debut at the championship, with the Faroes becoming the smallest nation to ever qualify.

France were the defending world champions, having won the 2023 edition after beating Norway 31–28 in the final in Herning, but were eliminated in the semifinals by Germany. Norway defeated Germany 23–20 in the final to claim their third title.

This tournament was considered a success and broke the single tournament attendance record, with 353,151 spectators.

== Bidding process ==
On 11 October 2018, the IHF announced the bidders for the championship.

- South Korea
- Serbia

However, both bids withdrew. On 25 September 2019, the next bids were as follows:

- Germany and Netherlands

On 28 February 2020, the tournament was awarded to Germany and Netherlands unopposed at its meeting held in Cairo, Egypt. It will be fourth time in history that the championship is jointly hosted after 1995, 1999 and 2023. Overall, this is Germany's fourth time hosting after 1965, (Note: As West Germany.) 1997 and 2017. This will be Netherlands's third time hosting the world championship after 1971 and 1986.

== Preparations ==
- On 27 November 2024, Tess Lieder, a member of the 2019 winning squad with the Netherlands, was announced as an ambassador.

- 2025 World Women's Handball Championship – Official Music Video
- Official Music Video

- On 18 September 2025, the official song "Hands Up for More", sung by Lucille & Bria X, was released.
- On 22 October 2025, a 54-square-metre artwork in Stuttgart was unveiled in preparation for the tournament.
- On 28 November 2025, more tickets for the main round were released.
- "Catch the Dream" will be the official motto of the competition.

=== Tickets ===
On 21 November 2024, the first tickets were released. By 24 January 2025, Dortmund stated that there is high demand for the tournament and 30% of tickets have been sold, with Germany's games in Stuttgart being sold out.

== Summary ==
=== Preliminary round ===
Group A

In Group A, the start of the group of death saw Romania triumph over wildcards Croatia 33–24. The Croats led at the start of proceedings before a 6–0 run gave the Romanians a 12–8 advantage that before the Croatian reduced the deficit to at half time to 13–12. Close at the half, a solid display by the Romanians in the second half meant they led the whole time for the final 30 minutes and secured an opening win. The later game saw European runners-up Denmark beat a poor Japanese team, who were going into the worlds as Asian champions, 36–19. The Danes completely dominated, with the Japanese only scoring a measly 6 goals at half time.

Two days later, Romania secured their passage to the main round after narrowly beating Japan, 31–27. A much improved Japanese team fought tooth and nail with the Romanians and were level for approximately the whole game, but slightly fell behind in the last ten minutes to concede defeat. Denmark earned a spot in the main round by beating Croatia 35–24.

Group B

In Group B, debutants Switzerland thrashed Iran 34–9. After a slow start, with the Iranians even scoring the first goal, The Swiss scored many fast break goals and tore apart the Iranian defense, while Iran only scored two goals in the second half. In the second encounter, Hungary defeated Africans, Senegal, 26–17. The Hungarians found it very difficult to pull away from the Senegalese, who were only down by one goal (10–9) early in the second half, but an 8–2 run by Hungary made the difference as the European bronze medalists managed to break away. Senegal were also helped by their goalkeeper and player of the match, Justicia Toubissa Elbeco.

The Swiss were able to avoid an upset by triumphing over a tough Senegalese team 25–24. The African side held an early 4–2 lead but a 5–0 run helped Switzerland get a more comfortable lead, forcing Senegal to use time a time out. 14–13 to Switzerland at the half, Senegal started better and regained the advantage at 17–15, but another run of Swiss goals put the game back in Switzerland's favour. From 24–20 down, Senegal managed to cut the deficit, but the comeback was too late and the last play of th game saw Senegal score to achieve a 25–24 final score for the Swiss. Group favourites, Hungary, score a tournament high 47 goals to destroy Iran 47–13 and qualify for the main round.

Group C

Co-hosts Germany started Group C in winning ways after securing a 32–25 win over Iceland, led by the seven goals from player of the match Alina Grijseels. The score was 25–22 in the 49th minute, but a 5–0 run by the Germans sealed the win. The later game saw Serbia come out victors against returnees Uruguay by a 31–19 scoreline after leading most of the game.

In matchday 2, Germany secured their passage to the main round with a 38–12 win over group underdogs Uruguay. For the first half, even though they didn't score many, the Uruguayans did a good job making Germany work for their early goals. The Germans were also very sloppy in the first half. But the second half was more comfortable for the co-hosts asthey won it 23–5 to make sure they move on to Dortmund in the next round. Later on, an all-European fight saw Serbia scrape to a 27–26 victory over Iceland. The encounter started tight and level at 8–8 but the Serbs had a 3–0 run to make it 11–8. The Serbian team frustrated Iceland and had a six goal lead going into the final 13 minutes, before the drama ensued. A near 10 minute goal drought, plus some five Icelandic goals made a 25–19 Serbia lead turn into 25–24 in the closing minutes. Iceland missed a fast break goal that could've leveled it at 25-all and Serbia finally broke the 10 minute drought and would later make it 27–25, before Iceland scored an empty goal and had the last possession to equalise, but the attempt was saved and Serbia held on.

In a game to decide who advanced, They led the game completely and didn't let Uruguay score for 13 minutes between the 24th and 37th minutes. In the final game of the group, Germany dominated Serbia seal first place by a score of 31–20 to make it three wins out of three heading into Dortmund.

Group D

The opening match of Group D, saw Spain labour to a 26–17 win over Paraguay. The Spaniards led the whole game but couldn't run riot over the spirited Paraguayans. Montenegro secured at winning start after beating debutants Faroe Islands 32–27. After a tight start, the Montenegrins would take a two goal lead by the 14th minute and they never threw the advantage away, helped by goalkeeper, Armelle Attingré achieving a 45% saving rate.

On the next gameday, Montenegro became one of the first teams to reach the main round after defeating a, once again, spirited Paraguay team 33–24, where they led the whole game, with Paraguay reducing the difference to single digits late on. The next game in Trier saw the first upset of the tournament with the Faroe Islands shocking Spain 27–25. With Spain being up 14–11 at the break, the Faroes came back flying to tie the game. The entire second half was neck and neck, but with a minute left, the Spaniards failed to equalise and by the end, Jana Mittún scored a last gasp goal to cement the upset for the islanders.

Faroe Islands secured their second win and sent themselves to the main round after beating Paraguay 36–25. The Faroes led by three to five goals during the first half, while the second half went the same way as Faroe Islands earned an eleven goal win, condemning the South Americans to the President's Cup. The final game of the group saw Spain overcome their previous upset to the Faroe Islands and defeated Montenegro 31–26 to win the group on a three-way tie. In a game they predominantly led the whole time, Spain cemented first place in the group heading into the main round.

Group E

The opening match of Group E was Austria vs African debutants Egypt. The match resulted with a 29–20 win for the Austrians. The Egyptians started brilliantly, being ahead for the first 17 minutes and taking advantage of Austrian mistakes. But the Europeans managed to come back after a 3–0 run, alongside reducing Egypt goals, gave Austria a lead at the interval. Austria started the second half better and broke away, helped by Egypt having 20 turnovers in the game. Co-hosts Netherlands got their campaign up and running with a 32–25 win over perennial participants, Argentina. Despite a nervous start, the Dutch, while not by much, were ahead the entire game and never looked like relinquishing it.

In one of the tightest games on paper, Austria confirmed their main round spot with a 27–23 close clash win over Argentina. The Argentinians took an early 7–3 advantage after ten minutes. But a 5–0 run, coupled with a Argentina not scoring for 10 minutes changed the game in Austria's way. The score was level at 12–12 going into half time. An early 4–1 run for the Austrians gave them a lead they never gave up. Argentina chances of winning were reduced after a red card for Elke Karsten with 10 minutes left was issued. After a stunning start by Egypt, holding back the co-hosts Netherlands incredibly well, the Dutch scored many goals just before half time and held back the Egyptian offense in the second half to win the game 37–15 and make the next round.

Group F

In 's-Hertogenbosch, Group F commenced with a 36–20 win for the Poles against Asian wildcards China. The Chinese underdogs gave Poland a very good fight in the opening 30 minutes, even leading for the opening minutes and refused to back away when behind, leaving the score at 15–12 at the half time. But once the second half started, it was completely different story. Poland annihilated China 21–8 in the last thirty minutes to 100% make sure the Poles wouldn't be shocked. Defending champions France easily cruised to a 43–18 win over Tunisia to commence their title defense in style. France won both halves with ease, player of the match, Suzanne Wajoka, leading the scoring with 10.

Tunisia almost managed a historic result, but fell away in the last minutes to lose to Poland 29–26. Both teams had three goals lead in the first half but the score was level at 12–12. Both side traded leads in the second half but Poland snuck themselves ahead late on to qualify for the main round. 68 goals were shared between France and China, but the French scored 47 of them to win 47–21. Wajoka again led the scoring with seven.

Group G

In Group G, Brazil came out 41–20 winners over returnees Cuba. After an impressive Cuban first half where they were very competitive, The Brazilian broke through to record an easy win. Sweden played Czech Republic later on in the day, where the Swedes won an all-European clash 31–23. The Swedes held a narrow lead the whole game before making it more comfortable at the end, despite Czech goalkeeper, Sabrina Novotná, saving 17 times.

On gameday two, a brilliant second half for Brazil ensured a 28–22 over Czech Republic, becoming the first team outside of Europe to beat a European team. The Czechs were dominant in the first half, having a 15–12 half time advantage. they increased their lead at the restart to 17–12, but the Brazilians turned a gear and came storming back, making it 18–18 after Czech Republic didn't score for 12 minutes. The rest of the game, Brazil took their first lead in the 49th minute and never looked back. The second game was held between Cuba and Sweden, where no mishaps took place and Sweden cruised to a 46–17 win and advancd to the main round, with the Swedes boasting a 81% shooting efficiency in the first half.

Group H

In Group H, the first game of the group was Angola vs Kazakhstan, where the Angolans sealed a convincing 38–20 win over the Kazakhs. The later game of matchday 1 saw the Olympic and European defending champions, Norway, with their first game at a major tournament under new coach Ole Gjekstad, beat South Korea 34–19. Tight at the start, a dominant second half confirmed a comprehensive win.

Despite an early lead for South Korea, African champions Angola emphatically fought back to earn a easy win over the Asians 34–23 buoyed by a 45% save rate by Angolan goalkeeper and player of the match Marta Samuel Alberton. The Angolans became the first Africans to progress. Matchday two's next game saw Norway obliterate Kazakhstan 41–16. Resting a few of their more important players, the Norwegians led the whole match to seal an comfortable win and advanced to the main round.

== Venues ==
Five venues were used in the tournament. While every venue bar Dortmund hosted the preliminary round, only Dortmund and Rotterdam hosted a main round and quarterfinals with the latter hosting the semifinals and final.

Tournament venues information
Venue	Rounds	Games
(Netherlands) Ahoy Arena	Group A and E, Main round Group I and Group III, Quarterfinals, Semifinals and Final	48
(Germany) Westfalenhalle	Main round Group II, Group IV and Quarterfinals	20
(Germany) Porsche-Arena	Group C and G	12
(Germany) SWT Arena	Group D and H	12
(Netherlands) Maaspoort	Group B and F and Presidents Cup	28

=== Germany ===
On 16 May 2022, the German Handball Association (DHB) presented the German venues: All venues have previous experience with hosting a World Handball Championship.

==== Overview of venues ====
- The Westfalenhalle in Dortmund was the biggest German venue, at a capacity of 12,000. Over its 73-year history, it has organised several championships in Darts, Figure Skating, Gymnastics, Ice Hockey and Table Tennis. Handball related, the hall has hosted the men's world championship in 1961, 1982 and 2007, plus a women's championship in 1965.
- The Porsche-Arena in Stuttgart was built in 2006. The venue has hosted the 2007 World Men's Handball Championship and 2015 Rhythmic Gymnastics World Championships.
- The SWT Arena in Trier hosts 5,400 spectators. The venue has numerous activities, but the only previous major tournament it has hosted was the 2017 World Women's Handball Championship.

2025 World Women's Handball Championship is located in Germany	Dortmund	Stuttgart	Trier
2025 World Women's Handball Championship is located in Germany	Westfalenhalle	Porsche-Arena	SWT Arena
2025 World Women's Handball Championship is located in Germany	Capacity: 12,000	Capacity: 6,200	Capacity: 5,400

=== Netherlands ===
On 5 April 2023 the Netherlands Handball Association presented the Dutch venues:

==== Overview of venues ====
- The Ahoy Arena was the main venue for the tournament, hosting every round of the tournament. The famous arena has organised many high-profile events, with the 2011 World Table Tennis Championships, 2017 World Short Track Speed Skating Championships and 2022 FIVB Volleyball Women's World Championship being just a few. Outside of sport, the venue also hosted the 1997 and 2016 MTV Europe Music Awards, plus the Eurovision Song Contest 2021.
- The Maaspoort facility in 's-Hertogenbosch is the smallest arena in the tournament. The venue is home to basketball team Heroes Den Bosch and organised the 1982 FIBA Intercontinental Cup.

2025 World Women's Handball Championship is located in Netherlands	Rotterdam	's-Hertogenbosch
2025 World Women's Handball Championship is located in Netherlands	Ahoy Arena	Maaspoort
2025 World Women's Handball Championship is located in Netherlands	Capacity: 16,000	Capacity: 3,500

Rejected venues
(Germany) Bietigheim-Bissingen	(Germany) Düsseldorf
EgeTrans Arena	PSD Bank Dome
Capacity: 4,494	Capacity: 15,151
(Germany) Heidelberg	(Germany) Krefeld
SNP Dome	Yayla Arena
Capacity: 4,134	Capacity: 7,714
(Germany) Oberhausen	(Netherlands) Amsterdam
Rudolf Weber-Arena	Sporthallen Zuid
Capacity: 10,300	Capacity: 3,000
(Netherlands) Eindhoven	(Netherlands) Maastricht
Indoor-Sportcentrum Eindhoven	MECC Maastricht
Capacity: 6,500	Capacity: 12,000

== Qualification ==
Team qualified Team failed to qualify Team withdrew or suspended Did not enter

The World Championship hosts were directly qualified, along with the reigning world champions. Since there were two organisers, all from Europe, the number of compulsory places for Europe was reduced by one: three instead of default four. The number of compulsory places awarded to other continental confederation remained unchanged. In regards to the 12 performance spots, and based on the results of the 2023 Women's World Championship, Europe received 11 more spots, while South and Central America took one.

The slot allocation was as follows:

- AHF (Asia): 4 slots
- CAHB (Africa): 4 slots
- EHF (Europe): 17 slots (including the two co-hosts and defending champion)
- NACHC (North America and the Caribbean): 1 slot
- OCHF (Oceania): 0 slots
- SCAHC (South and Central America): 4 slots
- Wildcards: 2 slots

Detailed summary of qualification process
Confederation	Direct slots	Teams started	Teams eliminated	Teams qualified	Percentage of entered teams with spots in finals	Qualifying start date	Qualifying end date
AHF	4	8	4	4+1	50%	3 December 2024	10 December 2024
CAHB	4	12	8	4	33%	27 November 2024	7 December 2024
EHF (Note: There are ways of qualifying from Europe, via the European Championship or European qualification)	15+2	34+2	19	15+2+1	44.11%	24 October 2024	13 April 2025
NACHC	1	5	4	1	20%	7 April 2025	12 April 2025
OCHF (Note: The Asian Championship acts as qualification for the Oceanian teams.)	0 or 1	0 (Note: Oceanian teams who enter, participate in the Asian Championship to decides their qualification. However, Australia withdrew before the tournament, meaning no Oceanian team qualified.)	0	0	0%		
SCAHC	4	8	4	4	50%	26 November 2024	26 April 2025
Total	28+2+2	14+2	24	28+2+2		24 October 2024	13 April 2025

Qualifying occurred between October 2024 and April 2025. Each region's continental championships acted as world championship qualification, although Europe also has its own qualification process. With the exception of Belarus and Russia, who are banned of the IHF due to the Russian invasion of Ukraine, all remaining IHF member associations were eligible to enter qualification.

Egypt, Faroe Islands and Switzerland will make their debut at the championship, with the Faroe Islands becoming the smallest nation to ever qualify, overtaking Greenland. Of the returnees, Uruguay return for the first time since 2011. Cuba came back after their last appearance was in 2019. Tunisia, return after missing out on 2023. Paraguay advanced to three consecutive finals for the first time. Iceland and Senegal qualified for two consecutive finals for the first time. Originally, China failed to qualify after finishing outside the top four at the Asian Championship, however, they were belatedly given a wildcard, continuing run of making every world championship since 1986.

Notable absentees include 2024 Olympic participants Slovenia, whose last failure to qualify was 2015. Slovenia became the first team since Croatia in 2013 to not qualify for the next world championship after taking part in the previous Olympics. Cameroon and Congo both failed to qualify having participated at the previous two championships. 2023 participants, Greenland, couldn't qualify after failing to enter the 2025 Nor.Ca. Women's Handball Championship for financial reasons. Chile and Ukraine failed to qualify after taking part in 2023.

AHF (4+1)

- China ^{WC}
- Iran
- Japan
- Kazakhstan
- South Korea

CAHB (4)

- Angola
- Egypt
- Senegal
- Tunisia

EHF (Note: There are two ways of qualifying from Europe, via the European Championship or European qualification) (17)

- Austria
- Croatia ^{WC}
- Czech Republic
- Denmark
- Faroe Islands
- France
- Germany (co-host)
- Hungary
- Iceland
- Montenegro
- Netherlands (co-host)
- Norway
- Poland
- Romania
- Serbia
- Spain
- Switzerland
- Sweden

NACHC (1)

- Cuba

OCHF (0)

- None qualified

SCAHC (4) (Note: There are two ways of qualifying from South and Central America, via the South and Central American Championship or Last Chance Qualification Tournament)

- Argentina
- Brazil
- Paraguay
- Uruguay

=== Wildcards ===
After no Oceanian team achieved a top 5 finish in the Asian Championship, two wildcards were given out by the IHF.

- China
- Croatia

On 31 March 2025, China was given the first wildcard due to good performances and country's position, making it a big market for the sport.

The United States were provisionally given a wildcard, so the team could use this opportunity to prepare for the 2028 Summer Olympics which they will be hosting. However, their lack of progress led the IHF to choose a different wildcard. Later on, four countries applied.

After their play off loss to Serbia, Slovenia's coach, Dragan Adžić, stated that his team deserved the last wildcard.

On 12 May 2025, Croatia was given the second wildcard.

== Qualified teams ==
Team	Qualification method	Date of qualification	Appearance(s)				Previous best performance (Note: Bold text indicates they hosted that edition.)
Team	Qualification method	Date of qualification	Total	First	Last	Streak	Previous best performance
Germany	Co-hosts	28 February 2020	27th	1957	2023	19	**Champions** (**1971, 1975, 1978 , 1993**)
Netherlands	Co-hosts	28 February 2020	15th	1971	2023	8	**Champions** (2019)
France	Defending champion	17 December 2023	17th	1986	2023	15	**Champions** (2003, 2017, 2023)
Argentina	2024 Central and South American Championship	29 November 2024	13th	1999	2023	12	Sixteenth place (2019)
Brazil	2024 Central and South American Championship	29 November 2024	16th	1995	2023	16	**Champions** (2013)
Uruguay	2024 Central and South American Championship	30 November 2024	6th	1997	2011	1	Twentieth place (2011)
Tunisia	2024 African Championship	4 December 2024	11th	1975	2021	1	Twelfth place (1975)
Angola	2024 African Championship	4 December 2024	18th	1990	2023	18	Seventh place (2007)
Senegal	2024 African Championship	4 December 2024	3rd	2019	2023	2	Eighteenth place (2019, 2023)
Egypt	2024 African Championship	4 December 2024	1st	Debut			
South Korea	2024 Asian Championship	6 December 2024	21st	1978	2023	21	**Champions** (1995)
Kazakhstan	2024 Asian Championship	6 December 2024	8th	2007	2023	4	Eighteenth place (2007)
Japan	2024 Asian Championship	6 December 2024	22nd	1962	2023	16	Seventh place (1965)
Iran	2024 Asian Championship	6 December 2024	3rd	2021	2023	3	31st place (2021, 2023)
Hungary	2024 European Championship	8 December 2024	25th	1957	2023	7	**Champions** (1965)
Norway	2024 European Championship	9 December 2024	23rd	1971	2023	20	**Champions** (**1999**, 2011, 2015, 2021)
Denmark	2024 European Championship	11 December 2024	23rd	1957	2023	9	**Champions** (1997)
China	Wildcard	31 March 2025	19th	1986	2023	19	Eighth place (1990)
Iceland	European qualification	10 April 2025	3rd	2011	2023	2	Twelfth place (2011)
Montenegro	European qualification	12 April 2025	8th	2011	2023	8	Fifth place (2019)
Poland	European qualification	12 April 2025	18th	1957	2023	3	Fourth place (2013, 2015)
Cuba	2025 Nor.Ca. Handball Championship	12 April 2025	5th	1999	2019	1	21st place (1999, 2019)
Spain	European qualification	13 April 2025	13th	1993	2023	10	Runners-up (2019)
Faroe Islands	European qualification	13 April 2025	1st	Debut			
Switzerland	European qualification	13 April 2025	1st	Debut			
Sweden	European qualification	13 April 2025	13th	1957	2023	6	Fourth place (2017, **2023**)
Romania	European qualification	13 April 2025	27th	1957	2023	27	**Champions** (**1962**)
Serbia (Note: Previously participated as Yugoslavia.)	European qualification	13 April 2025	17th	1957	2023	7	**Champions** (**1973**)
Czech Republic (Note: Previously participated as Czechoslovakia.)	European qualification	13 April 2025	19th	1957	2023	3	**Champions** (**1957**)
Austria	European qualification	13 April 2025	15th	1957	2023	3	Third place (1999)
Paraguay	South and Central American Last Chance Qualifier	26 April 2025	6th	2007	2023	3	21st place (2013, 2017)
Croatia	Wildcard	12 May 2025	9th	1995	2023	3	Sixth place (1997)

== Draw ==
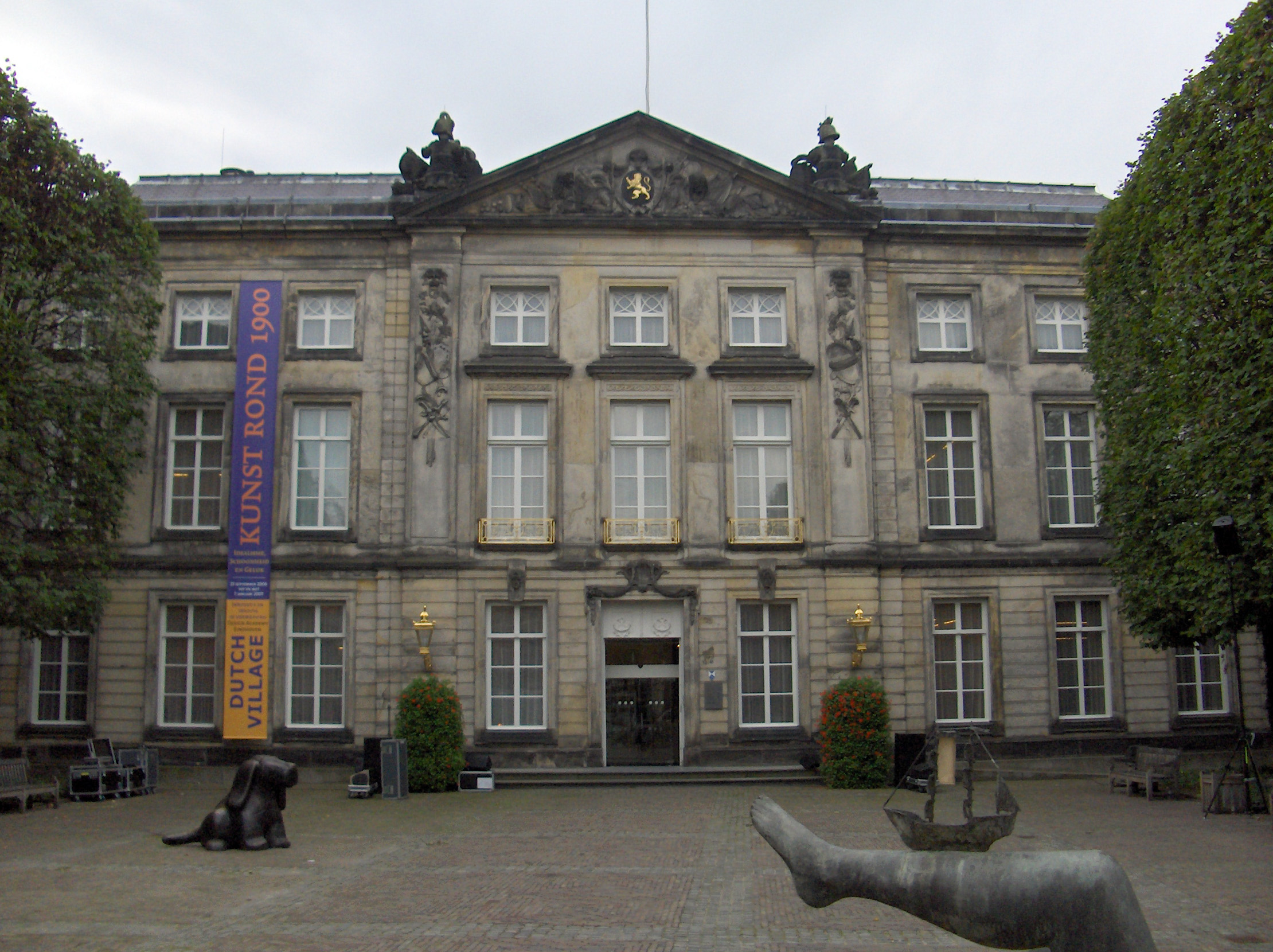
The Noordbrabants Museum in 's-Hertogenbosch hosted the draw.

The draw took place at 18:00 CET in 's-Hertogenbosch, Netherlands on 22 May 2025 at the Noordbrabants Museum. The guests for the draw were former German goalkeeper, Clara Woltering, and Dutch internationals, Debbie Bont, and former captain, Danick Snelder. The draw started with, in order, pots 1, 2, 3 and 4 being drawn, with each team selected then allocated into the first available group alphabetically.

- 2025 World Women's Handball Championship – Draw
- Draw Live Stream

=== Team allocation ===
In addition, six teams were pre-assigned by the two host nations into each of the available vacant groups: Slovenia were originally seeded into group D in Trier. But after their non-qualification, Faroe Islands replaced them.

Team	Group
Denmark	A
Hungary	B
Germany	C
Faroe Islands	D
Netherlands	E
France	F
Sweden	G
Norway	H

=== Seeding ===
The seeding was announced on 14 May 2025. The two wildcards were placed in pot 4.

Pot 1	Pot 2	Pot 3	Pot 4
France; Norway; Denmark; Hungary; Sweden; Netherlands (H); Germany (H); Montenegro	Poland; Brazil; Serbia; Romania; Switzerland; Spain; Austria; Angola	Czech Republic; Japan; Senegal; Iceland; Argentina; Faroe Islands; South Korea; Tunisia	Egypt; Uruguay; Kazakhstan; Paraguay; Iran; Cuba; China ^{WC} Croatia ^{WC}

=== Draw results ===
Group A in Rotterdam
Pos	Team
A1	Denmark
A2	Romania
A3	Japan
A4	Croatia

Group B in 's-Hertogenbosch
Pos	Team
B1	Hungary
B2	Switzerland
B3	Senegal
B4	Iran

Group C in Stuttgart
Pos	Team
C1	Germany (H)
C2	Serbia
C3	Iceland
C4	Uruguay

Group D in Trier
Pos	Team
D1	Montenegro
D2	Spain
D3	Faroe Islands
D4	Paraguay

Group E in Rotterdam
Pos	Team
E1	Netherlands (H)
E2	Austria
E3	Argentina
E4	Egypt

Group F in 's-Hertogenbosch
Pos	Team
F1	France
F2	Poland
F3	Tunisia
F4	China

Group G in Stuttgart
Pos	Team
G1	Sweden
G2	Brazil
G3	Czech Republic
G4	Cuba

Group H in Trier
Pos	Team
H1	Norway
H2	Angola
H3	South Korea
H4	Kazakhstan

=== Schedule ===
Schedule
Round	Matchday	Date
Preliminary round	Matchday 1	26–28 November 2025
Preliminary round	Matchday 2	28–30 November 2025
Preliminary round	Matchday 3	30 November – 2 December 2025
Main round and President's Cup	Matchday 4	2–4 December 2025
Main round and President's Cup	Matchday 5	4–6 December 2025
Main round and President's Cup	Matchday 6	6–8 December 2025
President's Cup ranking rounds	All games	10 December 2025
Knockout stage	Quarter-finals	9–10 December 2025
Knockout stage	Semi-finals	12 December 2025
Knockout stage	Final	14 December 2025

== Referees ==
22 referee pairs were selected on 10 October 2025.

Referees
Algeria	Yousef Belkhiri; Sid Ali Hamidi
Argentina	Mariana García; María Paolantoni
Argentina	Agustín Conberse; Santiago Correa
Bosnia and Herzegovina	Amar Konjičanin; Dino Konjičanin
Brazil	Bruna Correa; Renata Correa
Denmark	Mads Hansen; Jesper Madsen
Egypt	Heidy El-Saied; Yasmina El-Saied
France	Karim Gasmi; Raouf Gasmi
Germany	Ramesh Thiyagarajah; Suresh Thiyagarajah
Hungary	Kristóf Altmár; Márton Horváth
Iran	Ahmad Gheisarian; Amir Gheisarian

Referees
Kuwait	Maali Al-Enezi; Dalal Al-Naseem
Moldova	Alexei Covalciuc; Igor Covalciuc
Montenegro	Anđelina Kažanegra; Jelena Vujačić
Netherlands	William Weijmans; Rick Wolbertus
Norway	Mads Fremstad; Jørgen Jørstad
Poland	Michał Fabryczny; Jakub Rawicki
Serbia	Vladimir Jovandić; Marko Sekulić
Slovakia	Andrej Budzák; Michal Záhradník
Spain	Javier Álvarez; Yon Bustamante
Uruguay	Cristian Lemes; Mathias Sosa
Uzbekistan	Khasan Ismoilov; Khusan Ismoilov

== Squads ==
Each team had a provisional list of 35 players. Each roster consists of 18 players, of whom 16 may be fielded for each match.

== Preliminary round ==
The schedule was announced on 21 November 2024.

All times are local (UTC+1).

=== Opening ceremony ===
The opening ceremony took place before Germany's first match against Iceland. The first part saw numerous dancers on the court before the official song hands up for more was performed live by Lucille and Bria X. As usual, the flags of the participating nations were brought on to the court one by one.

=== Tiebreakers ===
In the group stage, teams are ranked according to points (2 points for a win, 1 point for a draw, 0 points for a loss). After completion of the group stage, if two or more teams have the same number of points, the ranking will be determined as follows:

1. Highest number of points in matches between the teams directly involved;
2. Superior goal difference in matches between the teams directly involved;
3. Highest number of goals scored in matches between the teams directly involved;
4. Superior goal difference in all matches of the group;
5. Highest number of plus goals in all matches of the group;

If the ranking of one of these teams is determined, the above criteria are consecutively followed until the ranking of all teams is determined. If no ranking can be determined, a decision shall be obtained by IHF through drawing of lots.

=== Group A ===
Pos	Team	Pld	W	D	L	GF	GA	GD	Pts	Qualification
1	Denmark	3	3	0	0	110	74	+36	6	Main round Group I
2	Romania	3	2	0	1	95	90	+5	4	Main round Group I
3	Japan	3	1	0	2	71	86	−15	2	Main round Group I
4	Croatia	3	0	0	3	67	93	−26	0	Presidents Cup

Source: IHF
Rules for classification: 1) points; 2) head-to-head points; 3) head-to-head goal difference; 4) head-to-head number of goals scored; 5) goal difference.

27 November 2025; 18:12	Romania	33–24	Croatia	Ahoy Arena, Rotterdam; Attendance: 1,057; Referees: Budzák, Záhradník (SVK)
27 November 2025; 18:12	Grozav 7	(13–12)	Barišić 7	Ahoy Arena, Rotterdam; Attendance: 1,057; Referees: Budzák, Záhradník (SVK)
27 November 2025; 18:12	1× (yellow card) 4× (suspension)	Report	1× (yellow card) 5× (suspension)	Ahoy Arena, Rotterdam; Attendance: 1,057; Referees: Budzák, Záhradník (SVK)

27 November 2025; 20:30	Denmark	36–19	Japan	Ahoy Arena, Rotterdam; Attendance: 740; Referees: Jovandić, Sekulić (SRB)
27 November 2025; 20:30	Aagot 6	(19–6)	Nakayama 5	Ahoy Arena, Rotterdam; Attendance: 740; Referees: Jovandić, Sekulić (SRB)
27 November 2025; 20:30	1× (yellow card) 4× (suspension)	Report	4× (suspension)	Ahoy Arena, Rotterdam; Attendance: 740; Referees: Jovandić, Sekulić (SRB)

29 November 2025; 18:00	Romania	31–27	Japan	Ahoy Arena, Rotterdam; Attendance: 2,035; Referees: R. Thiyagarajah, S. Thiyagarajah (GER)
29 November 2025; 18:00	Grozav, Ostase 8	(16–14)	Gray 7	Ahoy Arena, Rotterdam; Attendance: 2,035; Referees: R. Thiyagarajah, S. Thiyagarajah (GER)
29 November 2025; 18:00	1× (yellow card) 4× (suspension)	Report	5× (suspension)	Ahoy Arena, Rotterdam; Attendance: 2,035; Referees: R. Thiyagarajah, S. Thiyagarajah (GER)

29 November 2025; 20:30	Croatia	24–35	Denmark	Ahoy Arena, Rotterdam; Attendance: 1,800; Referees: Belkhiri, Hamidi (ALG)
29 November 2025; 20:30	Milosavljević 5	(10–16)	three players 6	Ahoy Arena, Rotterdam; Attendance: 1,800; Referees: Belkhiri, Hamidi (ALG)
29 November 2025; 20:30	5× (suspension)	Report	3× (suspension)	Ahoy Arena, Rotterdam; Attendance: 1,800; Referees: Belkhiri, Hamidi (ALG)

1 December 2025; 18:00	Japan	25–19	Croatia	Ahoy Arena, Rotterdam; Attendance: 480; Referees: Lemes, Sosa (URU)
1 December 2025; 18:00	Aizawa 8	(10–10)	Barišić, Šimara 3	Ahoy Arena, Rotterdam; Attendance: 480; Referees: Lemes, Sosa (URU)
1 December 2025; 18:00	3× (suspension)	Report	3× (suspension)	Ahoy Arena, Rotterdam; Attendance: 480; Referees: Lemes, Sosa (URU)

1 December 2025; 20:30	Denmark	39–31	Romania	Ahoy Arena, Rotterdam; Attendance: 1,475; Referees: A. Konjičanin, D. Konjičanin (BIH)
1 December 2025; 20:30	Møller 7	(21–18)	Grozav 9	Ahoy Arena, Rotterdam; Attendance: 1,475; Referees: A. Konjičanin, D. Konjičanin (BIH)
1 December 2025; 20:30	5× (suspension)	Report	5× (suspension)	Ahoy Arena, Rotterdam; Attendance: 1,475; Referees: A. Konjičanin, D. Konjičanin (BIH)

=== Group B ===
Pos	Team	Pld	W	D	L	GF	GA	GD	Pts	Qualification
1	Hungary	3	3	0	0	105	55	+50	6	Main round Group I
2	Switzerland	3	2	0	1	84	65	+19	4	Main round Group I
3	Senegal	3	1	0	2	71	72	−1	2	Main round Group I
4	Iran	3	0	0	3	43	111	−68	0	Presidents Cup

Source: IHF
Rules for classification: 1) points; 2) head-to-head points; 3) head-to-head goal difference; 4) head-to-head number of goals scored; 5) goal difference.

27 November 2025; 18:00	Switzerland	34–9	Iran	Maaspoort, 's-Hertogenbosch; Attendance: 750; Referees: Converse, Correa (ARG)
27 November 2025; 18:00	Felber 7	(19–7)	Merikh 3	Maaspoort, 's-Hertogenbosch; Attendance: 750; Referees: Converse, Correa (ARG)
27 November 2025; 18:00	1× (yellow card) 3× (suspension)	Report	4× (suspension)	Maaspoort, 's-Hertogenbosch; Attendance: 750; Referees: Converse, Correa (ARG)

27 November 2025; 20:30	Hungary	26–17	Senegal	Maaspoort, 's-Hertogenbosch; Attendance: 900; Referees: Kažanegra, Vujačić (MNE)
27 November 2025; 20:30	Márton 7	(10–7)	Abdourahim, Diawara 4	Maaspoort, 's-Hertogenbosch; Attendance: 900; Referees: Kažanegra, Vujačić (MNE)
27 November 2025; 20:30	3× (suspension)	Report	1× (yellow card) 4× (suspension)	Maaspoort, 's-Hertogenbosch; Attendance: 900; Referees: Kažanegra, Vujačić (MNE)

29 November 2025; 18:00	Switzerland	25–24	Senegal	Maaspoort, 's-Hertogenbosch; Attendance: 1,300; Referees: Álvarez, Bustamante (ESP)
29 November 2025; 18:00	Baumann, Emmenegger 6	(14–13)	Dapina 5	Maaspoort, 's-Hertogenbosch; Attendance: 1,300; Referees: Álvarez, Bustamante (ESP)
29 November 2025; 18:00	2× (yellow card) 5× (suspension)	Report	1× (yellow card) 2× (suspension)	Maaspoort, 's-Hertogenbosch; Attendance: 1,300; Referees: Álvarez, Bustamante (ESP)

29 November 2025; 20:30	Iran	13–47	Hungary	Maaspoort, 's-Hertogenbosch; Attendance: 1,100; Referees: Budzák, Záhradník (SVK)
29 November 2025; 20:30	Badvi, Karimi 3	(7–27)	Márton 9	Maaspoort, 's-Hertogenbosch; Attendance: 1,100; Referees: Budzák, Záhradník (SVK)
29 November 2025; 20:30	3× (suspension)	Report		Maaspoort, 's-Hertogenbosch; Attendance: 1,100; Referees: Budzák, Záhradník (SVK)

1 December 2025; 18:00	Senegal	30–21	Iran	Maaspoort, 's-Hertogenbosch; Attendance: 500; Referees: Fremstad, Jørstad (NOR)
1 December 2025; 18:00	Dapina 6	(17–15)	Karimi 6	Maaspoort, 's-Hertogenbosch; Attendance: 500; Referees: Fremstad, Jørstad (NOR)
1 December 2025; 18:00	1× (suspension)	Report	4× (suspension)	Maaspoort, 's-Hertogenbosch; Attendance: 500; Referees: Fremstad, Jørstad (NOR)

1 December 2025; 20:30	Hungary	32–25	Switzerland	Maaspoort, 's-Hertogenbosch; Attendance: 1,000; Referees: B. Correa, R, Correa (BRA)
1 December 2025; 20:30	Klujber 6	(13–14)	Schmid 12	Maaspoort, 's-Hertogenbosch; Attendance: 1,000; Referees: B. Correa, R, Correa (BRA)
1 December 2025; 20:30	2× (suspension)	Report	2× (yellow card) 3× (suspension)	Maaspoort, 's-Hertogenbosch; Attendance: 1,000; Referees: B. Correa, R, Correa (BRA)

=== Group C ===
Pos	Team	Pld	W	D	L	GF	GA	GD	Pts	Qualification
1	Germany (H)	3	3	0	0	101	57	+44	6	Main round Group II
2	Serbia	3	2	0	1	78	76	+2	4	Main round Group II
3	Iceland	3	1	0	2	84	78	+6	2	Main round Group II
4	Uruguay	3	0	0	3	50	102	−52	0	Presidents Cup

Source: IHF
Rules for classification: 1) points; 2) head-to-head points; 3) head-to-head goal difference; 4) head-to-head number of goals scored; 5) goal difference.
(H) Hosts

26 November 2025; 18:00	Germany	32–25	Iceland	Porsche-Arena, Stuttgart; Attendance: 5,527; Referees: Mikelić, Parađina (CRO)
26 November 2025; 18:00	Grijseels 7	(18–14)	Þorkelsdóttir 5	Porsche-Arena, Stuttgart; Attendance: 5,527; Referees: Mikelić, Parađina (CRO)
26 November 2025; 18:00	1× (yellow card) 2× (suspension)	Report	4× (suspension)	Porsche-Arena, Stuttgart; Attendance: 5,527; Referees: Mikelić, Parađina (CRO)

26 November 2025; 20:30	Serbia	31–19	Uruguay	Porsche-Arena, Stuttgart; Attendance: 5,527; Referees: Fabryczny, Rawicki (POL)
26 November 2025; 20:30	Garović 6	(15–10)	Grieco 4	Porsche-Arena, Stuttgart; Attendance: 5,527; Referees: Fabryczny, Rawicki (POL)
26 November 2025; 20:30	4× (suspension)	Report		Porsche-Arena, Stuttgart; Attendance: 5,527; Referees: Fabryczny, Rawicki (POL)

28 November 2025; 18:00	Uruguay	12–38	Germany	Porsche-Arena, Stuttgart; Attendance: 5,527; Referees: Al-Enezi, Al-Naseem (KUW)
28 November 2025; 18:00	five players 2	(7–15)	Engel, Kühne 7	Porsche-Arena, Stuttgart; Attendance: 5,527; Referees: Al-Enezi, Al-Naseem (KUW)
28 November 2025; 18:00	2× (suspension)	Report	2× (yellow card) 2× (suspension)	Porsche-Arena, Stuttgart; Attendance: 5,527; Referees: Al-Enezi, Al-Naseem (KUW)

28 November 2025; 20:30	Serbia	27–26	Iceland	Porsche-Arena, Stuttgart; Attendance: 5,527; Referees: A. Covalciuc, I. Covalciuc (MDA)
28 November 2025; 20:30	Krpež Šlezak, Skrobić 7	(19–13)	Erlingsdóttir, Þorkelsdóttir 5	Porsche-Arena, Stuttgart; Attendance: 5,527; Referees: A. Covalciuc, I. Covalciuc (MDA)
28 November 2025; 20:30	4× (suspension)	Report	1× (yellow card) 4× (suspension) 1× (red card)	Porsche-Arena, Stuttgart; Attendance: 5,527; Referees: A. Covalciuc, I. Covalciuc (MDA)

30 November 2025; 15:30	Iceland	33–19	Uruguay	Porsche-Arena, Stuttgart; Attendance: 5,527; Referees: Weijmans, Wolbertus (NED)
30 November 2025; 15:30	Erlingsdóttir 6	(17–7)	Bianco 5	Porsche-Arena, Stuttgart; Attendance: 5,527; Referees: Weijmans, Wolbertus (NED)
30 November 2025; 15:30	3× (suspension)	Report	3× (suspension)	Porsche-Arena, Stuttgart; Attendance: 5,527; Referees: Weijmans, Wolbertus (NED)

30 November 2025; 18:00	Germany	31–20	Serbia	Porsche-Arena, Stuttgart; Attendance: 5,527; Referees: Hansen, Madsen (DEN)
30 November 2025; 18:00	Döll 8	(17–10)	Cvijić 5	Porsche-Arena, Stuttgart; Attendance: 5,527; Referees: Hansen, Madsen (DEN)
30 November 2025; 18:00	4× (suspension)	Report	5× (suspension) 1× (red card)	Porsche-Arena, Stuttgart; Attendance: 5,527; Referees: Hansen, Madsen (DEN)

=== Group D ===
Pos	Team	Pld	W	D	L	GF	GA	GD	Pts	Qualification
1	Spain	3	2	0	1	82	70	+12	4 (Note: Spain 2 Pts, +3 GD; Montenegro 2 Pts, 0 GD; Faroe Islands 2 Pts, −3 GD.)	Main round Group II
2	Montenegro	3	2	0	1	92	83	+9	4	Main round Group II
3	Faroe Islands	3	2	0	1	90	82	+8	4	Main round Group II
4	Paraguay	3	0	0	3	67	96	−29	0	Presidents Cup

Source: IHF
Rules for classification: 1) points; 2) head-to-head points; 3) head-to-head goal difference; 4) head-to-head number of goals scored; 5) goal difference.
Notes:

26 November 2025; 18:00	Spain	26–17	Paraguay	SWT Arena, Trier; Attendance: 1,579; Referees: Ah. Gheisarian, Am. Gheisarian (IRI)
26 November 2025; 18:00	So Delgado 6	(15–9)	Insfrán, Mendoza 4	SWT Arena, Trier; Attendance: 1,579; Referees: Ah. Gheisarian, Am. Gheisarian (IRI)
26 November 2025; 18:00	2× (suspension)	Report	3× (suspension)	SWT Arena, Trier; Attendance: 1,579; Referees: Ah. Gheisarian, Am. Gheisarian (IRI)

26 November 2025; 20:30	Montenegro	32–27	Faroe Islands	SWT Arena, Trier; Attendance: 1,579; Referees: H. El-Saied, Y. El-Saied (EGY)
26 November 2025; 20:30	Vukčević 5	(15–13)	Brandenborg 8	SWT Arena, Trier; Attendance: 1,579; Referees: H. El-Saied, Y. El-Saied (EGY)
26 November 2025; 20:30	1× (yellow card) 7× (suspension) 1× (red card)	Report	1× (yellow card) 3× (suspension)	SWT Arena, Trier; Attendance: 1,579; Referees: H. El-Saied, Y. El-Saied (EGY)

28 November 2025; 18:00	Paraguay	25–34	Montenegro	SWT Arena, Trier; Attendance: 1,861; Referees: Weijmans, Wolbertus (NED)
28 November 2025; 18:00	Insfrán 8	(13–19)	Marsenić 6	SWT Arena, Trier; Attendance: 1,861; Referees: Weijmans, Wolbertus (NED)
28 November 2025; 18:00	3× (suspension)	Report	4× (suspension)	SWT Arena, Trier; Attendance: 1,861; Referees: Weijmans, Wolbertus (NED)

28 November 2025; 20:30	Spain	25–27	Faroe Islands	SWT Arena, Trier; Attendance: 2,027; Referees: Altmár, Horváth (HUN)
28 November 2025; 20:30	So Delgado 7	(14–11)	Brandenborg 7	SWT Arena, Trier; Attendance: 2,027; Referees: Altmár, Horváth (HUN)
28 November 2025; 20:30	2× (suspension)	Report		SWT Arena, Trier; Attendance: 2,027; Referees: Altmár, Horváth (HUN)

30 November 2025; 15:30	Faroe Islands	36–25	Paraguay	SWT Arena, Trier; Attendance: 2,801; Referees: Al-Enezi, Al-Naseem (KUW)
30 November 2025; 15:30	Nólsoy 6	(16–13)	Insfrán 9	SWT Arena, Trier; Attendance: 2,801; Referees: Al-Enezi, Al-Naseem (KUW)
30 November 2025; 15:30	3× (suspension)	Report	3× (suspension)	SWT Arena, Trier; Attendance: 2,801; Referees: Al-Enezi, Al-Naseem (KUW)

30 November 2025; 18:00	Montenegro	26–31	Spain	SWT Arena, Trier; Attendance: 2,879; Referees: K. Gasmi, R. Gasmi (FRA)
30 November 2025; 18:00	Brnović, Vukčević 7	(11–16)	Fernández 8	SWT Arena, Trier; Attendance: 2,879; Referees: K. Gasmi, R. Gasmi (FRA)
30 November 2025; 18:00	1× (yellow card) 1× (suspension)	Report	2× (suspension)	SWT Arena, Trier; Attendance: 2,879; Referees: K. Gasmi, R. Gasmi (FRA)

=== Group E ===
Pos	Team	Pld	W	D	L	GF	GA	GD	Pts	Qualification
1	Netherlands (H)	3	3	0	0	103	62	+41	6	Main round Group III
2	Austria	3	2	0	1	78	77	+1	4	Main round Group III
3	Argentina	3	1	0	2	75	73	+2	2	Main round Group III
4	Egypt	3	0	0	3	49	93	−44	0	Presidents Cup

Source: IHF
Rules for classification: 1) points; 2) head-to-head points; 3) head-to-head goal difference; 4) head-to-head number of goals scored; 5) goal difference.
(H) Hosts

28 November 2025; 18:00	Austria	29–20	Egypt	Ahoy Arena, Rotterdam; Attendance: 440; Referees: Lemes, Sosa (URU)
28 November 2025; 18:00	Schlegel, Stankovic 6	(14–12)	Gadalaah 6	Ahoy Arena, Rotterdam; Attendance: 440; Referees: Lemes, Sosa (URU)
28 November 2025; 18:00	5× (suspension)	Report	3× (suspension)	Ahoy Arena, Rotterdam; Attendance: 440; Referees: Lemes, Sosa (URU)

28 November 2025; 20:30	Netherlands	32–25	Argentina	Ahoy Arena, Rotterdam; Attendance: 9,000; Referees: A. Konjičanin, D. Konjičanin (BIH)
28 November 2025; 20:30	Dulfer 5	(16–11)	Karsten 8	Ahoy Arena, Rotterdam; Attendance: 9,000; Referees: A. Konjičanin, D. Konjičanin (BIH)
28 November 2025; 20:30	1× (yellow card) 6× (suspension)	Report	3× (suspension)	Ahoy Arena, Rotterdam; Attendance: 9,000; Referees: A. Konjičanin, D. Konjičanin (BIH)

30 November 2025; 18:00	Austria	27–23	Argentina	Ahoy Arena, Rotterdam; Attendance: 387; Referees: Belkhiri, Hamidi (ALG)
30 November 2025; 18:00	Ivančok-Šoltić 8	(12–12)	Casasola 6	Ahoy Arena, Rotterdam; Attendance: 387; Referees: Belkhiri, Hamidi (ALG)
30 November 2025; 18:00	4× (suspension)	Report	1× (suspension) 1× (red card)	Ahoy Arena, Rotterdam; Attendance: 387; Referees: Belkhiri, Hamidi (ALG)

30 November 2025; 20:30	Egypt	15–37	Netherlands	Ahoy Arena, Rotterdam; Attendance: 9,000; Referees: Jovandić, Sekulić (SRB)
30 November 2025; 20:30	Abdelnaeim 4	(10–18)	Van Wetering 8	Ahoy Arena, Rotterdam; Attendance: 9,000; Referees: Jovandić, Sekulić (SRB)
30 November 2025; 20:30	2× (suspension)	Report	3× (suspension) 1× (red card)	Ahoy Arena, Rotterdam; Attendance: 9,000; Referees: Jovandić, Sekulić (SRB)

2 December 2025; 18:00	Argentina	27–14	Egypt	Ahoy Arena, Rotterdam; Attendance: 265; Referees: R. Thiyagarajah, S. Thiyagarajah (GER)
2 December 2025; 18:00	Cavo 6	(10–11)	Abdelmalek 5	Ahoy Arena, Rotterdam; Attendance: 265; Referees: R. Thiyagarajah, S. Thiyagarajah (GER)
2 December 2025; 18:00	3× (suspension)	Report	4× (suspension)	Ahoy Arena, Rotterdam; Attendance: 265; Referees: R. Thiyagarajah, S. Thiyagarajah (GER)

2 December 2025; 20:30	Netherlands	34–22	Austria	Ahoy Arena, Rotterdam; Attendance: 9,000; Referees: Budzák, Záhradník (SVK)
2 December 2025; 20:30	Malestein 7	(14–12)	Ivančok-Šoltić, Stankovic 5	Ahoy Arena, Rotterdam; Attendance: 9,000; Referees: Budzák, Záhradník (SVK)
2 December 2025; 20:30	3× (suspension)	Report	2× (suspension)	Ahoy Arena, Rotterdam; Attendance: 9,000; Referees: Budzák, Záhradník (SVK)

=== Group F ===
Pos	Team	Pld	W	D	L	GF	GA	GD	Pts	Qualification
1	France	3	3	0	0	132	67	+65	6	Main round Group III
2	Poland	3	2	0	1	93	88	+5	4	Main round Group III
3	Tunisia	3	1	0	2	78	100	−22	2	Main round Group III
4	China	3	0	0	3	69	117	−48	0	Presidents Cup

Source: IHF
Rules for classification: 1) points; 2) head-to-head points; 3) head-to-head goal difference; 4) head-to-head number of goals scored; 5) goal difference.

28 November 2025; 18:30	Poland	36–20	China	Maaspoort, 's-Hertogenbosch; Attendance: 750; Referees: B. Correa, R, Correa (BRA)
28 November 2025; 18:30	Balsam 9	(15–12)	Liu C. 7	Maaspoort, 's-Hertogenbosch; Attendance: 750; Referees: B. Correa, R, Correa (BRA)
28 November 2025; 18:30	1× (suspension)	Report	3× (suspension)	Maaspoort, 's-Hertogenbosch; Attendance: 750; Referees: B. Correa, R, Correa (BRA)

28 November 2025; 21:00	France	43–18	Tunisia	Maaspoort, 's-Hertogenbosch; Attendance: 800; Referees: Fremstad, Jørstad (NOR)
28 November 2025; 21:00	Wajoka 10	(21–12)	Aouij 5	Maaspoort, 's-Hertogenbosch; Attendance: 800; Referees: Fremstad, Jørstad (NOR)
28 November 2025; 21:00	5× (suspension)	Report	4× (suspension)	Maaspoort, 's-Hertogenbosch; Attendance: 800; Referees: Fremstad, Jørstad (NOR)

30 November 2025; 15:30	Poland	29–26	Tunisia	Maaspoort, 's-Hertogenbosch; Attendance: 1,250; Referees: Kažanegra, Vujačić (MNE)
30 November 2025; 15:30	Balsam 7	(13–13)	Hachana 8	Maaspoort, 's-Hertogenbosch; Attendance: 1,250; Referees: Kažanegra, Vujačić (MNE)
30 November 2025; 15:30	1× (yellow card) 4× (suspension) 1× (red card)	Report	1× (yellow card) 3× (suspension)	Maaspoort, 's-Hertogenbosch; Attendance: 1,250; Referees: Kažanegra, Vujačić (MNE)

30 November 2025; 18:00	China	21–47	France	Maaspoort, 's-Hertogenbosch; Attendance: 1,100; Referees: Ah. Gheisarian, Am. Gheisarian (IRI)
30 November 2025; 18:00	Liu X. 6	(12–26)	Wajoka 7	Maaspoort, 's-Hertogenbosch; Attendance: 1,100; Referees: Ah. Gheisarian, Am. Gheisarian (IRI)
30 November 2025; 18:00	2× (suspension)	Report	4× (suspension)	Maaspoort, 's-Hertogenbosch; Attendance: 1,100; Referees: Ah. Gheisarian, Am. Gheisarian (IRI)

2 December 2025; 18:30	Tunisia	34–28	China	Maaspoort, 's-Hertogenbosch; Attendance: 850; Referees: Conberse, Correa (ARG)
2 December 2025; 18:30	Hamoruni 7	(18–17)	Liu Y. 7	Maaspoort, 's-Hertogenbosch; Attendance: 850; Referees: Conberse, Correa (ARG)
2 December 2025; 18:30	3× (suspension)	Report	1× (yellow card) 4× (suspension) 1× (red card)	Maaspoort, 's-Hertogenbosch; Attendance: 850; Referees: Conberse, Correa (ARG)

2 December 2025; 21:00	France	42–28	Poland	Maaspoort, 's-Hertogenbosch; Attendance: 1,000; Referees: Álvarez, Bustamante (ESP)
2 December 2025; 21:00	Foppa, Grandveau 7	(18–17)	Balsam 8	Maaspoort, 's-Hertogenbosch; Attendance: 1,000; Referees: Álvarez, Bustamante (ESP)
2 December 2025; 21:00	1× (yellow card) 4× (suspension)	Report	4× (suspension)	Maaspoort, 's-Hertogenbosch; Attendance: 1,000; Referees: Álvarez, Bustamante (ESP)

=== Group G ===
Pos	Team	Pld	W	D	L	GF	GA	GD	Pts	Qualification
1	Brazil	3	3	0	0	100	69	+31	6	Main round Group IV
2	Sweden	3	2	0	1	104	71	+33	4	Main round Group IV
3	Czech Republic	3	1	0	2	89	80	+9	2	Main round Group IV
4	Cuba	3	0	0	3	58	131	−73	0	Presidents Cup

Source: IHF
Rules for classification: 1) points; 2) head-to-head points; 3) head-to-head goal difference; 4) head-to-head number of goals scored; 5) goal difference.

27 November 2025; 18:00	Brazil	41–20	Cuba	Porsche-Arena, Stuttgart; Attendance: 2,122; Referees: Al-Enezi, Al-Naseem (KUW)
27 November 2025; 18:00	A. do Nascimento 7	(18–13)	Toledo 8	Porsche-Arena, Stuttgart; Attendance: 2,122; Referees: Al-Enezi, Al-Naseem (KUW)
27 November 2025; 18:00	3× (suspension)	Report	1× (suspension)	Porsche-Arena, Stuttgart; Attendance: 2,122; Referees: Al-Enezi, Al-Naseem (KUW)

27 November 2025; 20:30	Sweden	31–23	Czech Republic	Porsche-Arena, Stuttgart; Attendance: 2,122; Referees: García, Paolantoni (ARG)
27 November 2025; 20:30	Lerby, Lindqvist 6	(17–13)	Smetková 6	Porsche-Arena, Stuttgart; Attendance: 2,122; Referees: García, Paolantoni (ARG)
27 November 2025; 20:30	4× (suspension)	Report	1× (yellow card) 3× (suspension)	Porsche-Arena, Stuttgart; Attendance: 2,122; Referees: García, Paolantoni (ARG)

29 November 2025; 18:00	Brazil	28–22	Czech Republic	Porsche-Arena, Stuttgart; Attendance: 5,527; Referees: Hansen, Madsen (DEN)
29 November 2025; 18:00	De Paula, Fernándes 7	(12–15)	Kordovská 5	Porsche-Arena, Stuttgart; Attendance: 5,527; Referees: Hansen, Madsen (DEN)
29 November 2025; 18:00	1× (yellow card) 3× (suspension)	Report	3× (suspension)	Porsche-Arena, Stuttgart; Attendance: 5,527; Referees: Hansen, Madsen (DEN)

29 November 2025; 20:30	Cuba	17–46	Sweden	Porsche-Arena, Stuttgart; Attendance: 5,527; Referees: Fabryczny, Rawicki (POL)
29 November 2025; 20:30	Téllez 5	(9–25)	Lerby 11	Porsche-Arena, Stuttgart; Attendance: 5,527; Referees: Fabryczny, Rawicki (POL)
29 November 2025; 20:30	1× (yellow card) 2× (suspension)	Report	6× (suspension)	Porsche-Arena, Stuttgart; Attendance: 5,527; Referees: Fabryczny, Rawicki (POL)

1 December 2025; 18:00	Czech Republic	44–21	Cuba	Porsche-Arena, Stuttgart; Attendance: 2,908; Referees: Mikelić, Parađina (CRO)
1 December 2025; 18:00	Cholevová 11	(21–10)	Téllez, Toledo 6	Porsche-Arena, Stuttgart; Attendance: 2,908; Referees: Mikelić, Parađina (CRO)
1 December 2025; 18:00	4× (suspension)	Report	5× (suspension)	Porsche-Arena, Stuttgart; Attendance: 2,908; Referees: Mikelić, Parađina (CRO)

1 December 2025; 20:30	Sweden	27–31	Brazil	Porsche-Arena, Stuttgart; Attendance: 2,908; Referees: A. Covalciuc, I. Covalciuc (MDA)
1 December 2025; 20:30	Lerby 7	(16–15)	Fernándes 6	Porsche-Arena, Stuttgart; Attendance: 2,908; Referees: A. Covalciuc, I. Covalciuc (MDA)
1 December 2025; 20:30		Report		Porsche-Arena, Stuttgart; Attendance: 2,908; Referees: A. Covalciuc, I. Covalciuc (MDA)

=== Group H ===
Pos	Team	Pld	W	D	L	GF	GA	GD	Pts	Qualification
1	Norway	3	3	0	0	106	54	+52	6	Main round Group IV
2	Angola	3	2	0	1	91	74	+17	4	Main round Group IV
3	South Korea	3	1	0	2	77	85	−8	2	Main round Group IV
4	Kazakhstan	3	0	0	3	53	114	−61	0	Presidents Cup

Source: IHF
Rules for classification: 1) points; 2) head-to-head points; 3) head-to-head goal difference; 4) head-to-head number of goals scored; 5) goal difference.

27 November 2025; 18:00	Angola	38–20	Kazakhstan	SWT Arena, Trier; Attendance: 1,523; Referees: Altmár, Horváth (HUN)
27 November 2025; 18:00	Belo 5	(21–9)	Kuandykova 8	SWT Arena, Trier; Attendance: 1,523; Referees: Altmár, Horváth (HUN)
27 November 2025; 18:00	2× (suspension)	Report	2× (suspension)	SWT Arena, Trier; Attendance: 1,523; Referees: Altmár, Horváth (HUN)

27 November 2025; 20:30	Norway	34–19	South Korea	SWT Arena, Trier; Attendance: 1,847; Referees: Weijmans, Wolbertus (NED)
27 November 2025; 20:30	Reistad 10	(14–9)	Song J. 4	SWT Arena, Trier; Attendance: 1,847; Referees: Weijmans, Wolbertus (NED)
27 November 2025; 20:30	1× (yellow card)	Report	1× (yellow card) 3× (suspension)	SWT Arena, Trier; Attendance: 1,847; Referees: Weijmans, Wolbertus (NED)

29 November 2025; 18:00	Angola	34–23	South Korea	SWT Arena, Trier; Attendance: 3,153; Referees: K. Gasmi, R. Gasmi (FRA)
29 November 2025; 18:00	Kassoma 9	(19–13)	Lee Y. 6	SWT Arena, Trier; Attendance: 3,153; Referees: K. Gasmi, R. Gasmi (FRA)
29 November 2025; 18:00	1× (yellow card) 3× (suspension) 1× (red card)	Report	1× (yellow card) 1× (suspension)	SWT Arena, Trier; Attendance: 3,153; Referees: K. Gasmi, R. Gasmi (FRA)

29 November 2025; 20:30	Kazakhstan	16–41	Norway	SWT Arena, Trier; Attendance: 3,153; Referees: H. El-Saied, Y. El-Saied (EGY)
29 November 2025; 20:30	Khassakhanova 4	(7–21)	Hovden 8	SWT Arena, Trier; Attendance: 3,153; Referees: H. El-Saied, Y. El-Saied (EGY)
29 November 2025; 20:30	1× (yellow card) 1× (suspension)	Report		SWT Arena, Trier; Attendance: 3,153; Referees: H. El-Saied, Y. El-Saied (EGY)

1 December 2025; 18:00	South Korea	35–17	Kazakhstan	SWT Arena, Trier; Attendance: 1,553; Referees: Fabryczny, Rawicki (POL)
1 December 2025; 18:00	Song J. 6	(15–7)	Radayeva 4	SWT Arena, Trier; Attendance: 1,553; Referees: Fabryczny, Rawicki (POL)
1 December 2025; 18:00	2× (suspension)	Report	5× (suspension)	SWT Arena, Trier; Attendance: 1,553; Referees: Fabryczny, Rawicki (POL)

1 December 2025; 20:30	Norway	31–19	Angola	SWT Arena, Trier; Attendance: 1,873; Referees: García, Paolantoni (ARG)
1 December 2025; 20:30	Mørk 6	(19–10)	Paulo 6	SWT Arena, Trier; Attendance: 1,873; Referees: García, Paolantoni (ARG)
1 December 2025; 20:30	1× (yellow card) 2× (suspension)	Report	4× (suspension)	SWT Arena, Trier; Attendance: 1,873; Referees: García, Paolantoni (ARG)

== Presidents Cup ==
=== Group I ===
Pos	Team	Pld	W	D	L	GF	GA	GD	Pts	Qualification
1	Croatia	3	3	0	0	102	51	+51	6	25th place game
2	Paraguay	3	2	0	1	73	70	+3	4	27th place game
3	Uruguay	3	1	0	2	72	73	−1	2	29th place game
4	Iran	3	0	0	3	45	98	−53	0	31st place game

Source: IHF
Rules for classification: 1) points; 2) head-to-head points; 3) head-to-head goal difference; 4) head-to-head number of goals scored; 5) goal difference.

4 December 2025; 11:00	Croatia	38–9	Iran	Maaspoort, 's-Hertogenbosch; Attendance: 300; Referees: H. El-Saied, Y. El-Saied (EGY)
4 December 2025; 11:00	Vuković 9	(21–3)	Ghahramani 4	Maaspoort, 's-Hertogenbosch; Attendance: 300; Referees: H. El-Saied, Y. El-Saied (EGY)
4 December 2025; 11:00		Report	2× (suspension)	Maaspoort, 's-Hertogenbosch; Attendance: 300; Referees: H. El-Saied, Y. El-Saied (EGY)

4 December 2025; 13:30	Uruguay	20–23	Paraguay	Maaspoort, 's-Hertogenbosch; Attendance: 400; Referees: Kažanegra, Vujačić (MNE)
4 December 2025; 13:30	Bianco 6	(8–13)	Insfrán 7	Maaspoort, 's-Hertogenbosch; Attendance: 400; Referees: Kažanegra, Vujačić (MNE)
4 December 2025; 13:30		Report	2× (suspension)	Maaspoort, 's-Hertogenbosch; Attendance: 400; Referees: Kažanegra, Vujačić (MNE)

6 December 2025; 11:00	Croatia	34–25	Uruguay	Maaspoort, 's-Hertogenbosch; Attendance: 700; Referees: Al-Enezi, Al-Naseem (KUW)
6 December 2025; 11:00	Milosavljević 8	(19–10)	Eastman 5	Maaspoort, 's-Hertogenbosch; Attendance: 700; Referees: Al-Enezi, Al-Naseem (KUW)
6 December 2025; 11:00	7× (suspension)	Report	5× (suspension)	Maaspoort, 's-Hertogenbosch; Attendance: 700; Referees: Al-Enezi, Al-Naseem (KUW)

6 December 2025; 13:30	Iran	20–33	Paraguay	Maaspoort, 's-Hertogenbosch; Attendance: 500; Referees: B. Correa, R, Correa (BRA)
6 December 2025; 13:30	Merikh 11	(11–17)	Enríquez, Valdovinos 6	Maaspoort, 's-Hertogenbosch; Attendance: 500; Referees: B. Correa, R, Correa (BRA)
6 December 2025; 13:30	1× (yellow card) 4× (suspension)	Report	2× (suspension)	Maaspoort, 's-Hertogenbosch; Attendance: 500; Referees: B. Correa, R, Correa (BRA)

8 December 2025; 11:00	Paraguay	17–30	Croatia	Maaspoort, 's-Hertogenbosch; Attendance: 500; Referees: H. El-Saied, Y. El-Saied (EGY)
8 December 2025; 11:00	Fernández 6	(11–14)	Pavlović 6	Maaspoort, 's-Hertogenbosch; Attendance: 500; Referees: H. El-Saied, Y. El-Saied (EGY)
8 December 2025; 11:00	2× (yellow card) 2× (suspension)	Report	1× (yellow card) 1× (suspension)	Maaspoort, 's-Hertogenbosch; Attendance: 500; Referees: H. El-Saied, Y. El-Saied (EGY)

8 December 2025; 13:30	Iran	16–27	Uruguay	Maaspoort, 's-Hertogenbosch; Attendance: 400; Referees: R. Thiyagarajah, S. Thiyagarajah (GER)
8 December 2025; 13:30	three players 3	(8–16)	Bianco 5	Maaspoort, 's-Hertogenbosch; Attendance: 400; Referees: R. Thiyagarajah, S. Thiyagarajah (GER)
8 December 2025; 13:30	1× (suspension)	Report	4× (suspension)	Maaspoort, 's-Hertogenbosch; Attendance: 400; Referees: R. Thiyagarajah, S. Thiyagarajah (GER)

=== Group II ===
Pos	Team	Pld	W	D	L	GF	GA	GD	Pts	Qualification
1	China	3	3	0	0	101	92	+9	6	25th place game
2	Egypt	3	1	1	1	88	79	+9	3	27th place game
3	Cuba	3	1	1	1	85	88	−3	3	29th place game
4	Kazakhstan	3	0	0	3	76	91	−15	0	31st place game

Source: IHF
Rules for classification: 1) points; 2) head-to-head points; 3) head-to-head goal difference; 4) head-to-head number of goals scored; 5) goal difference.

4 December 2025; 16:00	Egypt	32–35	China	Maaspoort, 's-Hertogenbosch; Attendance: 500; Referees: Converse, Correa (ARG)
4 December 2025; 16:00	Osama 10	(17–21)	Liu C. 10	Maaspoort, 's-Hertogenbosch; Attendance: 500; Referees: Converse, Correa (ARG)
4 December 2025; 16:00	2× (suspension)	Report	1× (yellow card) 2× (suspension)	Maaspoort, 's-Hertogenbosch; Attendance: 500; Referees: Converse, Correa (ARG)

4 December 2025; 18:30	Cuba	29–28	Kazakhstan	Maaspoort, 's-Hertogenbosch; Attendance: 650; Referees: Weijmans, Wolbertus (NED)
4 December 2025; 18:30	Téllez 10	(12–14)	Khassakhanova 9	Maaspoort, 's-Hertogenbosch; Attendance: 650; Referees: Weijmans, Wolbertus (NED)
4 December 2025; 18:30	1× (yellow card) 3× (suspension)	Report	4× (suspension)	Maaspoort, 's-Hertogenbosch; Attendance: 650; Referees: Weijmans, Wolbertus (NED)

6 December 2025; 16:00	Egypt	26–26	Cuba	Maaspoort, 's-Hertogenbosch; Attendance: 700; Referees: Kažanegra, Vujačić (MNE)
6 December 2025; 16:00	Hagag 6	(14–12)	Téllez 11	Maaspoort, 's-Hertogenbosch; Attendance: 700; Referees: Kažanegra, Vujačić (MNE)
6 December 2025; 16:00	1× (yellow card) 2× (suspension)	Report	5× (suspension)	Maaspoort, 's-Hertogenbosch; Attendance: 700; Referees: Kažanegra, Vujačić (MNE)

6 December 2025; 18:30	China	32–30	Kazakhstan	Maaspoort, 's-Hertogenbosch; Attendance: 400; Referees: Ah. Gheisarian, Am. Gheisarian (IRI)
6 December 2025; 18:30	three players 5	(16–15)	A. Zharapova 8	Maaspoort, 's-Hertogenbosch; Attendance: 400; Referees: Ah. Gheisarian, Am. Gheisarian (IRI)
6 December 2025; 18:30	6× (suspension) 1× (red card)	Report	6× (suspension)	Maaspoort, 's-Hertogenbosch; Attendance: 400; Referees: Ah. Gheisarian, Am. Gheisarian (IRI)

8 December 2025; 16:00	Kazakhstan	18–30	Egypt	Maaspoort, 's-Hertogenbosch; Attendance: 450; Referees: B. Correa, R, Correa (BRA)
8 December 2025; 16:00	Khassakhanova 6	(8–13)	Osama 5	Maaspoort, 's-Hertogenbosch; Attendance: 450; Referees: B. Correa, R, Correa (BRA)
8 December 2025; 16:00	3× (suspension)	Report		Maaspoort, 's-Hertogenbosch; Attendance: 450; Referees: B. Correa, R, Correa (BRA)

8 December 2025; 18:30	China	34–30	Cuba	Maaspoort, 's-Hertogenbosch; Attendance: 600; Referees: Al-Enezi, Al-Naseem (KUW)
8 December 2025; 18:30	Liu Y. 9	(17–15)	Téllez 14	Maaspoort, 's-Hertogenbosch; Attendance: 600; Referees: Al-Enezi, Al-Naseem (KUW)
8 December 2025; 18:30	7× (suspension)	Report	2× (yellow card) 4× (suspension)	Maaspoort, 's-Hertogenbosch; Attendance: 600; Referees: Al-Enezi, Al-Naseem (KUW)

=== 31st place game ===
10 December 2025; 11:00	Iran	19–24	Kazakhstan	Maaspoort, 's-Hertogenbosch; Attendance: 400; Referees: Al-Enezi, Al-Naseem (KUW)
10 December 2025; 11:00	Merikh 5	(9–13)	Kuandykova 6	Maaspoort, 's-Hertogenbosch; Attendance: 400; Referees: Al-Enezi, Al-Naseem (KUW)
10 December 2025; 11:00	1× (yellow card) 3× (suspension)	Report	4× (suspension)	Maaspoort, 's-Hertogenbosch; Attendance: 400; Referees: Al-Enezi, Al-Naseem (KUW)

=== 29th place game ===
10 December 2025; 13:30	Uruguay	33–27	Cuba	Maaspoort, 's-Hertogenbosch; Attendance: 500; Referees: Ah. Gheisarian, Am. Gheisarian (IRI)
10 December 2025; 13:30	Eastman 7	(17–16)	Céspedes, Téllez 7	Maaspoort, 's-Hertogenbosch; Attendance: 500; Referees: Ah. Gheisarian, Am. Gheisarian (IRI)
10 December 2025; 13:30	5× (suspension)	Report	3× (suspension)	Maaspoort, 's-Hertogenbosch; Attendance: 500; Referees: Ah. Gheisarian, Am. Gheisarian (IRI)

=== 27th place game ===
10 December 2025; 16:00	Paraguay	30–28	Egypt	Maaspoort, 's-Hertogenbosch; Attendance: 500; Referees: Weijmans, Wolbertus (NED)
10 December 2025; 16:00	Fernández 10	(14–12)	Osama 8	Maaspoort, 's-Hertogenbosch; Attendance: 500; Referees: Weijmans, Wolbertus (NED)
10 December 2025; 16:00	2× (suspension)	Report	1× (yellow card) 2× (suspension)	Maaspoort, 's-Hertogenbosch; Attendance: 500; Referees: Weijmans, Wolbertus (NED)

=== 25th place game ===
10 December 2025; 18:30	Croatia	41–22	China	Maaspoort, 's-Hertogenbosch; Attendance: 600; Referees: H. El-Saied, Y. El-Saied (EGY)
10 December 2025; 18:30	Barišić 8	(23–13)	Pan F. 12	Maaspoort, 's-Hertogenbosch; Attendance: 600; Referees: H. El-Saied, Y. El-Saied (EGY)
10 December 2025; 18:30	2× (suspension)	Report	4× (suspension)	Maaspoort, 's-Hertogenbosch; Attendance: 600; Referees: H. El-Saied, Y. El-Saied (EGY)

== Main round ==
All points obtained in the preliminary round against teams that advance as well are carried over.

=== Group I ===
Results between advancing teams from Group A and Group B were carried over.

Pos	Team	Pld	W	D	L	GF	GA	GD	Pts	Qualification
1	Denmark	5	5	0	0	179	126	+53	10	Quarterfinals
2	Hungary	5	3	1	1	145	125	+20	7	Quarterfinals
3	Romania	5	3	0	2	164	141	+23	6	
4	Japan	5	2	1	2	126	137	−11	5	
5	Switzerland	5	1	0	4	118	155	−37	2	
6	Senegal	5	0	0	5	107	155	−48	0	

Source: IHF
Rules for classification: 1) points; 2) head-to-head points; 3) head-to-head goal difference; 4) head-to-head number of goals scored; 5) goal difference.

3 December 2025; 15:30	Japan	27–21	Switzerland	Ahoy Arena, Rotterdam; Attendance: 520; Referees: Fremstad, Jørstad (NOR)
3 December 2025; 15:30	Aizawa 8	(13–10)	Goldmann, Schmid 5	Ahoy Arena, Rotterdam; Attendance: 520; Referees: Fremstad, Jørstad (NOR)
3 December 2025; 15:30	5× (suspension)	Report	1× (suspension)	Ahoy Arena, Rotterdam; Attendance: 520; Referees: Fremstad, Jørstad (NOR)

3 December 2025; 18:00	Hungary	34–29	Romania	Ahoy Arena, Rotterdam; Attendance: 550; Referees: Jovandić, Sekulić (SRB)
3 December 2025; 18:00	Klujber 7	(18–16)	Grozav 7	Ahoy Arena, Rotterdam; Attendance: 550; Referees: Jovandić, Sekulić (SRB)
3 December 2025; 18:00	4× (suspension)	Report	3× (suspension)	Ahoy Arena, Rotterdam; Attendance: 550; Referees: Jovandić, Sekulić (SRB)

3 December 2025; 20:30	Denmark	40–26	Senegal	Ahoy Arena, Rotterdam; Attendance: 185; Referees: B. Correa, R, Correa (BRA)
3 December 2025; 20:30	Scaglione 11	(20–11)	Niombla 7	Ahoy Arena, Rotterdam; Attendance: 185; Referees: B. Correa, R, Correa (BRA)
3 December 2025; 20:30	2× (yellow card) 2× (suspension)	Report	3× (suspension)	Ahoy Arena, Rotterdam; Attendance: 185; Referees: B. Correa, R, Correa (BRA)

5 December 2025; 15:30	Romania	37–17	Senegal	Ahoy Arena, Rotterdam; Attendance: 210; Referees: Álvarez, Bustamante (ESP)
5 December 2025; 15:30	Grozav 9	(21–7)	Diawara 5	Ahoy Arena, Rotterdam; Attendance: 210; Referees: Álvarez, Bustamante (ESP)
5 December 2025; 15:30	2× (suspension)	Report	1× (suspension)	Ahoy Arena, Rotterdam; Attendance: 210; Referees: Álvarez, Bustamante (ESP)

5 December 2025; 18:00	Japan	26–26	Hungary	Ahoy Arena, Rotterdam; Attendance: 485; Referees: Lemes, Sosa (URU)
5 December 2025; 18:00	Aizawa, Yoshidome 6	(7–8)	Simon, Vámos 5	Ahoy Arena, Rotterdam; Attendance: 485; Referees: Lemes, Sosa (URU)
5 December 2025; 18:00	3× (suspension)	Report	4× (suspension)	Ahoy Arena, Rotterdam; Attendance: 485; Referees: Lemes, Sosa (URU)

5 December 2025; 20:30	Switzerland	23–36	Denmark	Ahoy Arena, Rotterdam; Attendance: 630; Referees: Conberse, Correa (ARG)
5 December 2025; 20:30	Schmid 8	(13–17)	three players 6	Ahoy Arena, Rotterdam; Attendance: 630; Referees: Conberse, Correa (ARG)
5 December 2025; 20:30	1× (yellow card) 4× (suspension)	Report	1× (yellow card)	Ahoy Arena, Rotterdam; Attendance: 630; Referees: Conberse, Correa (ARG)

7 December 2025; 15:30	Senegal	23–27	Japan	Ahoy Arena, Rotterdam; Attendance: 165; Referees: Belkhiri, Hamidi (ALG)
7 December 2025; 15:30	N'Diaye 6	(13–11)	Nakayama 8	Ahoy Arena, Rotterdam; Attendance: 165; Referees: Belkhiri, Hamidi (ALG)
7 December 2025; 15:30	3× (suspension)	Report	3× (suspension)	Ahoy Arena, Rotterdam; Attendance: 165; Referees: Belkhiri, Hamidi (ALG)

7 December 2025; 18:00	Switzerland	24–36	Romania	Ahoy Arena, Rotterdam; Attendance: 820; Referees: Kažanegra, Vujačić (MNE)
7 December 2025; 18:00	Gautschi 6	(9–18)	Ostase 8	Ahoy Arena, Rotterdam; Attendance: 820; Referees: Kažanegra, Vujačić (MNE)
7 December 2025; 18:00	3× (suspension)	Report	1× (yellow card) 3× (suspension) 1× (red card)	Ahoy Arena, Rotterdam; Attendance: 820; Referees: Kažanegra, Vujačić (MNE)

7 December 2025; 20:30	Hungary	27–28	Denmark	Ahoy Arena, Rotterdam; Attendance: 2,840; Referees: Álvarez, Bustamante (ESP)
7 December 2025; 20:30	Simon 8	(15–13)	Aagot 6	Ahoy Arena, Rotterdam; Attendance: 2,840; Referees: Álvarez, Bustamante (ESP)
7 December 2025; 20:30	1× (yellow card) 3× (suspension)	Report	2× (suspension)	Ahoy Arena, Rotterdam; Attendance: 2,840; Referees: Álvarez, Bustamante (ESP)

=== Group II ===
Results between advancing teams from Group C and Group D were carried over.

Pos	Team	Pld	W	D	L	GF	GA	GD	Pts	Qualification
1	Germany (H)	5	5	0	0	164	114	+50	10	Quarterfinals
2	Montenegro	5	3	0	2	145	138	+7	6	Quarterfinals
3	Serbia	5	2	1	2	126	150	−24	5	
4	Spain	5	2	0	3	140	136	+4	4	
5	Faroe Islands	5	1	1	3	141	157	−16	3	
6	Iceland	5	1	0	4	134	155	−21	2	

Source: IHF
Rules for classification: 1) points; 2) head-to-head points; 3) head-to-head goal difference; 4) head-to-head number of goals scored; 5) goal difference.
(H) Hosts

2 December 2025; 15:30	Spain	29–31	Serbia	Westfalenhalle, Dortmund; Attendance: 7,122; Referees: Altmár, Horváth (HUN)
2 December 2025; 15:30	So Delgado 11	(19–17)	Jovović 7	Westfalenhalle, Dortmund; Attendance: 7,122; Referees: Altmár, Horváth (HUN)
2 December 2025; 15:30	2× (suspension)	Report	2× (yellow card) 5× (suspension) 1× (red card)	Westfalenhalle, Dortmund; Attendance: 7,122; Referees: Altmár, Horváth (HUN)

2 December 2025; 18:00	Iceland	27–36	Montenegro	Westfalenhalle, Dortmund; Attendance: 7,122; Referees: Hansen, Madsen (DEN)
2 December 2025; 18:00	three players 6	(11–14)	Trivić 7	Westfalenhalle, Dortmund; Attendance: 7,122; Referees: Hansen, Madsen (DEN)
2 December 2025; 18:00		Report	4× (suspension)	Westfalenhalle, Dortmund; Attendance: 7,122; Referees: Hansen, Madsen (DEN)

2 December 2025; 20:30	Germany	36–26	Faroe Islands	Westfalenhalle, Dortmund; Attendance: 7,122; Referees: K. Gasmi, R. Gasmi (FRA)
2 December 2025; 20:30	Döll 6	(20–14)	Brandenborg 5	Westfalenhalle, Dortmund; Attendance: 7,122; Referees: K. Gasmi, R. Gasmi (FRA)
2 December 2025; 20:30	1× (yellow card) 3× (suspension)	Report	4× (suspension)	Westfalenhalle, Dortmund; Attendance: 7,122; Referees: K. Gasmi, R. Gasmi (FRA)

4 December 2025; 15:30	Serbia	31–31	Faroe Islands	Westfalenhalle, Dortmund; Attendance: 9,049; Referees: García, Paolantoni (ARG)
4 December 2025; 15:30	Krpež Šlezak, Skrobić 8	(16–14)	Mittún 10	Westfalenhalle, Dortmund; Attendance: 9,049; Referees: García, Paolantoni (ARG)
4 December 2025; 15:30	1× (yellow card) 5× (suspension) 2× (red card)	Report	1× (yellow card) 3× (suspension)	Westfalenhalle, Dortmund; Attendance: 9,049; Referees: García, Paolantoni (ARG)

4 December 2025; 18:00	Montenegro	18–36	Germany	Westfalenhalle, Dortmund; Attendance: 9,049; Referees: Altmár, Horváth (HUN)
4 December 2025; 18:00	four players 3	(6–16)	Engel 6	Westfalenhalle, Dortmund; Attendance: 9,049; Referees: Altmár, Horváth (HUN)
4 December 2025; 18:00	1× (yellow card) 6× (suspension)	Report	4× (suspension)	Westfalenhalle, Dortmund; Attendance: 9,049; Referees: Altmár, Horváth (HUN)

4 December 2025; 20:30	Iceland	23–30	Spain	Westfalenhalle, Dortmund; Attendance: 9,049; Referees: Budzák, Záhradník (SVK)
4 December 2025; 20:30	Sturludóttir 7	(13–14)	Lyn. Tchaptchet 6	Westfalenhalle, Dortmund; Attendance: 9,049; Referees: Budzák, Záhradník (SVK)
4 December 2025; 20:30	1× (yellow card) 4× (suspension) 1× (red card)	Report	4× (suspension)	Westfalenhalle, Dortmund; Attendance: 9,049; Referees: Budzák, Záhradník (SVK)

6 December 2025; 15:30	Montenegro	33–17	Serbia	Westfalenhalle, Dortmund; Attendance: 10,522; Referees: A. Konjičanin, D. Konjičanin (BIH)
6 December 2025; 15:30	Trivić 9	(13–9)	Cvijić 5	Westfalenhalle, Dortmund; Attendance: 10,522; Referees: A. Konjičanin, D. Konjičanin (BIH)
6 December 2025; 15:30	1× (yellow card) 5× (suspension)	Report	5× (suspension)	Westfalenhalle, Dortmund; Attendance: 10,522; Referees: A. Konjičanin, D. Konjičanin (BIH)

6 December 2025; 18:00	Spain	25–29	Germany	Westfalenhalle, Dortmund; Attendance: 10,522; Referees: Hansen, Madsen (DEN)
6 December 2025; 18:00	So Delgado 10	(10–13)	Vogel 6	Westfalenhalle, Dortmund; Attendance: 10,522; Referees: Hansen, Madsen (DEN)
6 December 2025; 18:00	1× (yellow card) 2× (suspension)	Report	1× (yellow card) 3× (suspension)	Westfalenhalle, Dortmund; Attendance: 10,522; Referees: Hansen, Madsen (DEN)

6 December 2025; 20:30	Faroe Islands	30–33	Iceland	Westfalenhalle, Dortmund; Attendance: 10,722; Referees: Fabryczny, Rawicki (POL)
6 December 2025; 20:30	Hansen, Mittún 6	(14–16)	Þorkelsdóttir 8	Westfalenhalle, Dortmund; Attendance: 10,722; Referees: Fabryczny, Rawicki (POL)
6 December 2025; 20:30	4× (suspension)	Report	3× (suspension)	Westfalenhalle, Dortmund; Attendance: 10,722; Referees: Fabryczny, Rawicki (POL)

=== Group III ===
Results between advancing teams from Group E and Group F were carried over.

Pos	Team	Pld	W	D	L	GF	GA	GD	Pts	Qualification
1	Netherlands (H)	5	5	0	0	164	113	+51	10	Quarterfinals
2	France	5	4	0	1	166	106	+60	8	Quarterfinals
3	Poland	5	3	0	2	142	156	−14	6	
4	Austria	5	1	0	4	121	148	−27	2 (Note: Austria 2 Pts, +2 GD; Tunisia 2 Pts, +1 GD; Argentina 2 Pts, −3 GD.)	
5	Tunisia	5	1	0	4	121	166	−45	2	
6	Argentina	5	1	0	4	120	145	−25	2	

Source: IHF
Rules for classification: 1) points; 2) head-to-head points; 3) head-to-head goal difference; 4) head-to-head number of goals scored; 5) goal difference.
(H) Hosts
Notes:

4 December 2025; 15:30	Argentina	25–28	Poland	Ahoy Arena, Rotterdam; Attendance: 1,050; Referees: Belkhiri, Hamidi (ALG)
4 December 2025; 15:30	Karsten 9	(15–14)	Balsam 6	Ahoy Arena, Rotterdam; Attendance: 1,050; Referees: Belkhiri, Hamidi (ALG)
4 December 2025; 15:30	5× (suspension)	Report	7× (suspension)	Ahoy Arena, Rotterdam; Attendance: 1,050; Referees: Belkhiri, Hamidi (ALG)

4 December 2025; 18:00	France	29–17	Austria	Ahoy Arena, Rotterdam; Attendance: 2,825; Referees: Lemes, Sosa (URU)
4 December 2025; 18:00	eight players 3	(14–12)	Ivančok-Šoltić 5	Ahoy Arena, Rotterdam; Attendance: 2,825; Referees: Lemes, Sosa (URU)
4 December 2025; 18:00	5× (suspension)	Report	4× (suspension)	Ahoy Arena, Rotterdam; Attendance: 2,825; Referees: Lemes, Sosa (URU)

4 December 2025; 20:30	Netherlands	39–21	Tunisia	Ahoy Arena, Rotterdam; Attendance: 4,580; Referees: R. Thiyagarajah, S. Thiyagarajah (GER)
4 December 2025; 20:30	Van Wetering 9	(22–9)	Aouij, Belhadj 4	Ahoy Arena, Rotterdam; Attendance: 4,580; Referees: R. Thiyagarajah, S. Thiyagarajah (GER)
4 December 2025; 20:30	2× (suspension)	Report	2× (suspension)	Ahoy Arena, Rotterdam; Attendance: 4,580; Referees: R. Thiyagarajah, S. Thiyagarajah (GER)

6 December 2025; 15:30	Austria	25–27	Tunisia	Ahoy Arena, Rotterdam; Attendance: 4,765; Referees: Fremstad, Jørstad (NOR)
6 December 2025; 15:30	Ivančok-Šoltić 7	(12–14)	Hamoruni 8	Ahoy Arena, Rotterdam; Attendance: 4,765; Referees: Fremstad, Jørstad (NOR)
6 December 2025; 15:30	3× (suspension)	Report	3× (suspension)	Ahoy Arena, Rotterdam; Attendance: 4,765; Referees: Fremstad, Jørstad (NOR)

6 December 2025; 18:00	Argentina	17–29	France	Ahoy Arena, Rotterdam; Attendance: 8,100; Referees: R. Thiyagarajah, S. Thiyagarajah (GER)
6 December 2025; 18:00	Bono 4	(8–14)	Bouktit 5	Ahoy Arena, Rotterdam; Attendance: 8,100; Referees: R. Thiyagarajah, S. Thiyagarajah (GER)
6 December 2025; 18:00	3× (suspension)	Report	3× (suspension)	Ahoy Arena, Rotterdam; Attendance: 8,100; Referees: R. Thiyagarajah, S. Thiyagarajah (GER)

6 December 2025; 20:30	Poland	22–33	Netherlands	Ahoy Arena, Rotterdam; Attendance: 9,000; Referees: Jovandić, Sekulić (SRB)
6 December 2025; 20:30	Kochaniak 6	(11–18)	Van Wetering 5	Ahoy Arena, Rotterdam; Attendance: 9,000; Referees: Jovandić, Sekulić (SRB)
6 December 2025; 20:30	3× (suspension)	Report	2× (suspension)	Ahoy Arena, Rotterdam; Attendance: 9,000; Referees: Jovandić, Sekulić (SRB)

8 December 2025; 15:30	Tunisia	29–30	Argentina	Ahoy Arena, Rotterdam; Attendance: 2,050; Referees: Weijmans, Wolbertus (NED)
8 December 2025; 15:30	Aouij 7	(10–17)	Karsten 8	Ahoy Arena, Rotterdam; Attendance: 2,050; Referees: Weijmans, Wolbertus (NED)
8 December 2025; 15:30	7× (suspension)	Report	4× (suspension)	Ahoy Arena, Rotterdam; Attendance: 2,050; Referees: Weijmans, Wolbertus (NED)

8 December 2025; 18:00	Poland	35–30	Austria	Ahoy Arena, Rotterdam; Attendance: 5,125; Referees: Conberse, Correa (ARG)
8 December 2025; 18:00	Balsam 10	(17–18)	Schlegel 9	Ahoy Arena, Rotterdam; Attendance: 5,125; Referees: Conberse, Correa (ARG)
8 December 2025; 18:00	1× (yellow card) 5× (suspension)	Report	3× (suspension)	Ahoy Arena, Rotterdam; Attendance: 5,125; Referees: Conberse, Correa (ARG)

8 December 2025; 20:30	France	23–26	Netherlands	Ahoy Arena, Rotterdam; Attendance: 9,000; Referees: Fremstad, Jørstad (NOR)
8 December 2025; 20:30	Horacek 7	(13–14)	Maarschalkerweerd, Van Wetering 5	Ahoy Arena, Rotterdam; Attendance: 9,000; Referees: Fremstad, Jørstad (NOR)
8 December 2025; 20:30	1× (yellow card) 2× (suspension)	Report	1× (yellow card) 5× (suspension)	Ahoy Arena, Rotterdam; Attendance: 9,000; Referees: Fremstad, Jørstad (NOR)

=== Group IV ===
Results between advancing teams from Group G and Group H were carried over.

Pos	Team	Pld	W	D	L	GF	GA	GD	Pts	Qualification
1	Norway	5	5	0	0	174	92	+82	10	Quarterfinals
2	Brazil	5	4	0	1	137	133	+4	8	Quarterfinals
3	Angola	5	3	0	2	133	135	−2	6	
4	Sweden	5	2	0	3	140	146	−6	4	
5	Czech Republic	5	1	0	4	116	152	−36	2	
6	South Korea	5	0	0	5	122	164	−42	0	

Source: IHF
Rules for classification: 1) points; 2) head-to-head points; 3) head-to-head goal difference; 4) head-to-head number of goals scored; 5) goal difference.

3 December 2025; 15:30	Czech Republic	25–28	Angola	Westfalenhalle, Dortmund; Attendance: 1,925; Referees: A. Covalciuc, I. Covalciuc (MDA)
3 December 2025; 15:30	Desortová 6	(13–15)	Nenganga 8	Westfalenhalle, Dortmund; Attendance: 1,925; Referees: A. Covalciuc, I. Covalciuc (MDA)
3 December 2025; 15:30	3× (suspension)	Report	2× (suspension)	Westfalenhalle, Dortmund; Attendance: 1,925; Referees: A. Covalciuc, I. Covalciuc (MDA)

3 December 2025; 18:00	Brazil	32–25	South Korea	Westfalenhalle, Dortmund; Attendance: 1,925; Referees: Fabryczny, Rawicki (POL)
3 December 2025; 18:00	A. do Nascimento, Guarieiro 5	(16–11)	Jeon 7	Westfalenhalle, Dortmund; Attendance: 1,925; Referees: Fabryczny, Rawicki (POL)
3 December 2025; 18:00	2× (suspension)	Report	1× (yellow card) 1× (suspension)	Westfalenhalle, Dortmund; Attendance: 1,925; Referees: Fabryczny, Rawicki (POL)

3 December 2025; 20:30	Norway	39–26	Sweden	Westfalenhalle, Dortmund; Attendance: 1,925; Referees: Hansen, Madsen (DEN)
3 December 2025; 20:30	Bakkerud, Reistad 6	(24–11)	Blohm, Lerby 5	Westfalenhalle, Dortmund; Attendance: 1,925; Referees: Hansen, Madsen (DEN)
3 December 2025; 20:30	1× (yellow card) 4× (suspension)	Report	1× (suspension)	Westfalenhalle, Dortmund; Attendance: 1,925; Referees: Hansen, Madsen (DEN)

5 December 2025; 15:30	Angola	26–32	Brazil	Westfalenhalle, Dortmund; Attendance: 4,562; Referees: A. Konjičanin, D. Konjičanin (BIH)
5 December 2025; 15:30	Paulo 9	(15–18)	Bitolo 8	Westfalenhalle, Dortmund; Attendance: 4,562; Referees: A. Konjičanin, D. Konjičanin (BIH)
5 December 2025; 15:30	1× (yellow card) 2× (suspension)	Report	3× (suspension)	Westfalenhalle, Dortmund; Attendance: 4,562; Referees: A. Konjičanin, D. Konjičanin (BIH)

5 December 2025; 18:00	Sweden	32–27	South Korea	Westfalenhalle, Dortmund; Attendance: 4,562; Referees: A. Covalciuc, I. Covalciuc (MDA)
5 December 2025; 18:00	Hagman 7	(20–11)	Gim 7	Westfalenhalle, Dortmund; Attendance: 4,562; Referees: A. Covalciuc, I. Covalciuc (MDA)
5 December 2025; 18:00	3× (suspension)	Report	1× (suspension)	Westfalenhalle, Dortmund; Attendance: 4,562; Referees: A. Covalciuc, I. Covalciuc (MDA)

5 December 2025; 20:30	Czech Republic	14–37	Norway	Westfalenhalle, Dortmund; Attendance: 4,562; Referees: K. Gasmi, R. Gasmi (FRA)
5 December 2025; 20:30	Franková 3	(8–18)	Wollik 6	Westfalenhalle, Dortmund; Attendance: 4,562; Referees: K. Gasmi, R. Gasmi (FRA)
5 December 2025; 20:30	3× (suspension)	Report	1× (yellow card) 3× (suspension)	Westfalenhalle, Dortmund; Attendance: 4,562; Referees: K. Gasmi, R. Gasmi (FRA)

7 December 2025; 15:30	South Korea	28–32	Czech Republic	Westfalenhalle, Dortmund; Attendance: 6,254; Referees: García, Paolantoni (ARG)
7 December 2025; 15:30	Lee Y. 8	(15–15)	Cholevová 8	Westfalenhalle, Dortmund; Attendance: 6,254; Referees: García, Paolantoni (ARG)
7 December 2025; 15:30	1× (yellow card) 1× (suspension)	Report	5× (suspension)	Westfalenhalle, Dortmund; Attendance: 6,254; Referees: García, Paolantoni (ARG)

7 December 2025; 18:00	Angola	26–24	Sweden	Westfalenhalle, Dortmund; Attendance: 6,254; Referees: K. Gasmi, R. Gasmi (FRA)
7 December 2025; 18:00	Paulo 8	(10–10)	Lerby 6	Westfalenhalle, Dortmund; Attendance: 6,254; Referees: K. Gasmi, R. Gasmi (FRA)
7 December 2025; 18:00	5× (suspension)	Report	1× (yellow card) 1× (suspension)	Westfalenhalle, Dortmund; Attendance: 6,254; Referees: K. Gasmi, R. Gasmi (FRA)

7 December 2025; 20:30	Norway	33–14	Brazil	Westfalenhalle, Dortmund; Attendance: 6,254; Referees: Altmár, Horváth (HUN)
7 December 2025; 20:30	Ingstad 6	(18–7)	J. do Nascimento, Rosa 3	Westfalenhalle, Dortmund; Attendance: 6,254; Referees: Altmár, Horváth (HUN)
7 December 2025; 20:30	1× (suspension)	Report	2× (suspension)	Westfalenhalle, Dortmund; Attendance: 6,254; Referees: Altmár, Horváth (HUN)

== Final round ==
Quarter-finals
10 December
Denmark	26
France	31
9 December
Germany	30
Brazil	23
10 December
Netherlands	28
Hungary	23
9 December
Norway	32
Montenegro	23

Semi-finals
12 December
France	23
Germany	29
12 December
Netherlands	25
Norway	35

Final
14 December
Germany	20
Norway	23
Third place
14 December
France (ET)	33
Netherlands	31

=== Quarterfinals ===
9 December 2025; 17:15	Germany	30–23	Brazil	Westfalenhalle, Dortmund; Attendance: 10,522; Referees: Álvarez, Bustamante (ESP)
9 December 2025; 17:15	Döll 6	(17–11)	De Paula 6	Westfalenhalle, Dortmund; Attendance: 10,522; Referees: Álvarez, Bustamante (ESP)
9 December 2025; 17:15	3× (suspension)	Report	1× (yellow card) 4× (suspension)	Westfalenhalle, Dortmund; Attendance: 10,522; Referees: Álvarez, Bustamante (ESP)

9 December 2025; 20:30	Norway	32–23	Montenegro	Westfalenhalle, Dortmund; Attendance: 10,522; Referees: K. Gasmi, R. Gasmi (FRA)
9 December 2025; 20:30	Reistad 9	(19–11)	Jauković 8	Westfalenhalle, Dortmund; Attendance: 10,522; Referees: K. Gasmi, R. Gasmi (FRA)
9 December 2025; 20:30	2× (yellow card) 5× (suspension)	Report	1× (yellow card) 5× (suspension)	Westfalenhalle, Dortmund; Attendance: 10,522; Referees: K. Gasmi, R. Gasmi (FRA)

10 December 2025; 18:00	Netherlands	28–23	Hungary	Ahoy Arena, Rotterdam; Attendance: 9,000; Referees: Hansen, Madsen (DEN)
10 December 2025; 18:00	Housheer 8	(14–9)	five players 3	Ahoy Arena, Rotterdam; Attendance: 9,000; Referees: Hansen, Madsen (DEN)
10 December 2025; 18:00	5× (suspension) 1× (red card)	Report	1× (yellow card) 4× (suspension) 1× (red card)	Ahoy Arena, Rotterdam; Attendance: 9,000; Referees: Hansen, Madsen (DEN)

10 December 2025; 21:00	Denmark	26–31	France	Ahoy Arena, Rotterdam; Attendance: 2,845; Referees: Altmár, Horváth (HUN)
10 December 2025; 21:00	Jørgensen 11	(12–17)	Bouktit 8	Ahoy Arena, Rotterdam; Attendance: 2,845; Referees: Altmár, Horváth (HUN)
10 December 2025; 21:00	1× (yellow card) 3× (suspension)	Report	3× (suspension)	Ahoy Arena, Rotterdam; Attendance: 2,845; Referees: Altmár, Horváth (HUN)

=== Semifinals ===
12 December 2025; 17:45	France	23–29	Germany	Ahoy Arena, Rotterdam; Attendance: 5,555; Referees: Jovandić, Sekulić (SRB)
12 December 2025; 17:45	Bouktit, Grandveau 5	(12–15)	Döll 9	Ahoy Arena, Rotterdam; Attendance: 5,555; Referees: Jovandić, Sekulić (SRB)
12 December 2025; 17:45	1× (yellow card) 3× (suspension) 1× (red card)	Report	1× (yellow card) 2× (suspension)	Ahoy Arena, Rotterdam; Attendance: 5,555; Referees: Jovandić, Sekulić (SRB)

12 December 2025; 20:45	Netherlands	25–35	Norway	Ahoy Arena, Rotterdam; Attendance: 9,000; Referees: A. Konjičanin, D. Konjičanin (BIH)
12 December 2025; 20:45	Housheer, Polman 6	(14–18)	Reistad 10	Ahoy Arena, Rotterdam; Attendance: 9,000; Referees: A. Konjičanin, D. Konjičanin (BIH)
12 December 2025; 20:45	1× (yellow card) 2× (suspension)	Report	4× (suspension)	Ahoy Arena, Rotterdam; Attendance: 9,000; Referees: A. Konjičanin, D. Konjičanin (BIH)

=== Third place game ===
14 December 2025; 14:30	France	33–31 (ET)	Netherlands	Ahoy Arena, Rotterdam; Attendance: 9,000; Referees: Lemes, Sosa (URU)
14 December 2025; 14:30	Bouktit 9	(12–11)	three players 6	Ahoy Arena, Rotterdam; Attendance: 9,000; Referees: Lemes, Sosa (URU)
14 December 2025; 14:30	1× (yellow card) 3× (suspension)	Report	1× (yellow card) 3× (suspension)	Ahoy Arena, Rotterdam; Attendance: 9,000; Referees: Lemes, Sosa (URU)

=== Final ===
14 December 2025; 17:30	Germany	20–23	Norway	Ahoy Arena, Rotterdam; Attendance: 9,000; Referees: Álvarez, Bustamante (ESP)
14 December 2025; 17:30	three players 4	(11–11)	T. Deila, Reistad 5	Ahoy Arena, Rotterdam; Attendance: 9,000; Referees: Álvarez, Bustamante (ESP)
14 December 2025; 17:30	2× (yellow card) 2× (suspension)	Report	2× (yellow card) 4× (suspension)	Ahoy Arena, Rotterdam; Attendance: 9,000; Referees: Álvarez, Bustamante (ESP)

== Final ranking awards ==
Places 1 to 4 and 25 to 32 will be decided by play-off or knock-out. The losers of the quarter finals will be ranked 5th to 8th according to the places in the main round, points gained and goal difference. Teams finishing third in the main round will be ranked 9th to 12th, teams finishing fourth in the main round 13th to 16th, teams finishing fifth in the main round 17th to 20th and teams ranked sixth 21st to 24th. In case of a tie in points gained, the goal difference of the main round will be taken into account, then number of goals scored. If teams are still equal, number of points gained in the preliminary round will be considered followed by the goal difference and then number of goals scored in the preliminary round.

Germany earned their best result since 1993. Angola achieved Africa's best result since 2013. Sweden, South Korea and Senegal had their worst placements in their history, finishing 15th, 23rd and 24th respectively.

Pos	Team	Pld	W	D	L	PF	PA	PD	Pts	Qualification
1st place, gold medalist(s)	Norway	9	9	0	0	305	176	+129	18	Champions
2nd place, silver medalist(s)	Germany	9	8	0	1	281	195	+86	16	Second place
3rd place, bronze medalist(s)	France	9	7	0	2	300	213	+87	14	Third place
4	Netherlands	9	7	0	2	285	219	+66	14	Fourth place
5	Denmark	7	6	0	1	229	192	+37	12	Eliminated in quarterfinals
6	Brazil	7	5	0	2	201	183	+18	10	Eliminated in quarterfinals
7	Hungary	7	4	1	2	215	166	+49	9	Eliminated in quarterfinals
8	Montenegro	7	4	0	3	202	195	+7	8	Eliminated in quarterfinals
9	Romania	5	3	0	2	164	141	+23	6	Third in main round
10	Angola	5	3	0	2	133	135	−2	6	Third in main round
11	Poland	5	3	0	2	142	156	−14	6	Third in main round
12	Serbia	5	2	1	2	126	150	−24	5	Third in main round
13	Japan	5	2	1	2	126	137	−11	5	Fourth in main round
14	Spain	5	2	0	3	140	136	+4	4	Fourth in main round
15	Sweden	5	2	0	3	140	146	−6	4	Fourth in main round
16	Austria	5	1	0	4	121	148	−27	2	Fourth in main round
17	Faroe Islands	5	1	1	3	141	157	−16	3	Fifth in main round
18	Czech Republic	5	1	0	4	116	152	−36	2	Fifth in main round
19	Switzerland	5	1	0	4	118	155	−37	2	Fifth in main round
20	Tunisia	5	1	0	4	121	166	−45	2	Fifth in main round
21	Iceland	5	1	0	4	134	155	−21	2	Sixth in main round
22	Argentina	5	1	0	4	120	145	−25	2	Sixth in main round
23	South Korea	5	0	0	5	122	164	−42	0	Sixth in main round
24	Senegal	5	0	0	5	107	155	−48	0	Sixth in main round
25	Croatia	7	4	0	3	210	166	+44	8	25th place match
26	China	7	3	0	4	192	250	−58	6	25th place match
27	Paraguay	7	3	0	4	170	194	−24	6	27th place match
28	Egypt	7	1	1	5	165	202	−37	3	27th place match
29	Uruguay	7	2	0	5	155	202	−47	4	29th place match
30	Cuba	7	1	1	5	170	252	−82	3	29th place match
31	Kazakhstan	7	1	0	6	153	224	−71	2	31st place match
32	Iran	7	0	0	7	107	233	−126	0	31st place match

Source: IHF
Rules for classification: 1) points; 2) head-to-head points; 3) head-to-head goal difference; 4) head-to-head number of goals scored; 5) goal difference.

Qualified for the 2027 World Women's Handball Championship

2025 Women's World Champions

Norway
5th title

Team roster: Veronica Kristiansen, Anniken Obaidli, Maren Nyland Aardahl, Stine Skogrand, Live Rushfeldt Deila, Nora Mørk, Malin Aune, Kristine Breistøl, Vilde Ingstad, Katrine Lunde, Selma Henriksen, Ingvild Bakkerud, Henny Reistad, Emilie Hovden, Thale Rushfeldt Deila, Anniken Wollik, Eli Marie Raasok, June Krogh
Head Coach: Ole Gjekstad

=== All-star Team ===
The All-star Team was announced on 14 December 2025.

Position	Player
Goalkeeper	(Norway) Katrine Lunde
Left wing	(Germany) Antje Döll
Left back	(Germany) Emily Vogel
Centre back	(Brazil) Bruna de Paula
Right back	(Netherlands) Dione Housheer
Right wing	(Norway) Emilie Hovden
Pivot	(France) Sarah Bouktit
Best young player	(Germany) Viola Leuchter
MVP	(Norway) Henny Reistad

== Statistics ==
=== Top goalscorers ===
Rank	Name	Goals	Shots	%
1	(Norway) Henny Reistad	55	71	77
2	(Cuba) Lorena Téllez	54	82	66
3	(Germany) Antje Döll	49	56	88
4	(Romania) Sorina Grozav	46	75	61
5	(France) Sarah Bouktit	44	51	86
5	(Netherlands) Bo van Wetering	44	55	80
5	(Netherlands) Dione Housheer	44	80	55
8	(Spain) Danila So Delgado	43	68	63
9	(Poland) Magda Balsam	42	53	79
10	(Paraguay) Fernanda Insfrán	40	66	61

=== Top goalkeepers ===
Rank	Name	%	Saves	Shots
1	(Norway) Katrine Lunde	48	86	180
2	(Switzerland) Seraina Kuratli	47	17	36
3	(Norway) Eli Marie Raasok	45	50	112
4	(France) Camille Depuiset	44	15	34
5	(Montenegro) Marija Marsenić	40	17	42
5	(Hungary) Kinga Janurik	40	26	65
7	(Romania) Bianca Curmenț	39	40	103
8	(Germany) Katharina Filter	36	81	225
8	(Croatia) Lucija Bešen	36	60	168
8	(Netherlands) Yara ten Holte	36	87	244
8	(Czech Republic) Sabrina Novotná	36	53	149

=== Top assists ===
Rank	Name	Team	Assists	Matches played
1	Léna Grandveau	France	44	9
2	Matea Pletikosić	Montenegro	41	7
2	Dione Housheer	Netherlands	41	9
4	Nora Mørk	Norway	31	9
5	Paula Ruegger	Uruguay	30	7
6	Bruna de Paula	Brazil	29	7
6	Jana Mittún	Faroe Islands	29	6
6	Kerstin Kündig	Switzerland	29	6
9	Tamara Horacek	France	28	9
9	Henny Reistad	Norway	28	9

Source: IHF
