= 2021–22 Úrvalsdeild kvenna (handball) =

Icelandic women's handball league season

Úrvalsdeild kvenna
- Season: 2021–22
- Champion: Fram
- Relegated: Afturelding
- All statistics correct as of 21 June 2022.

The 2021–22 Úrvalsdeild kvenna, known as the Olís-deildin for sponsorship reasons, was the 83rd season of the Úrvalsdeild kvenna, Iceland's premier women's handball league.

KA/Þór are the defending champions, from the 2020–21 season, where they won their first title.

== Team information ==
Following eight teams are competing in the 2021–22 Úrvalsdeild kvenna hanbolti.

Locations of the 2021 Úrvalsdeild kvenna teams

Team.	Town	Arena	Capacity
Valur	Reykjavík	Origo-höllin	2,000
Fram	Reykjavík	Framhúsið	1,200
KA/Þór	Akureyri	KA heimilið	1,000
Stjarnan	Garðabær	TM-höllin	2,000
Haukar Handball	Hafnarfjörður	Schenker-höllin	1,800
ÍBV	Vestmannaeyjar	Íþróttamiðstöðin Vestmannaeyja	800
Kópavogs	Kópavogur	Kórinn	400
Afturelding	Mosfellsbær	Íþróttahúsið Varmá	2,000

=== Head coaches ===
Team	Head coach
Valur	(Iceland) Ágúst Þór Jóhannsson
ÍBV	(Iceland) Sigurður Bragason (Iceland) Hilmar Ágús Björnsson
Stjarnan	(Iceland) Rakel Dögg Bragadóttir
Kópavogs	(Iceland) Halldór Harri Kristjánsson
Fram	(Iceland) Stefán Arnarsson
KA/Þór	(Iceland) Andri Snær Stefánsson
Afturelding	(Iceland) Guðmundur Helgi Pálsson
Haukar Handball	(Iceland) Gunnar Gunnarsson

== Regular season ==
=== Standings ===
Pos	Team	Pld	W	D	L	GF	GA	GD	Pts	Qualification or relegation
1	Valur	8	7	0	1	236	176	+60	14	Division Champion + Championship Play-Off
2	Fram	8	6	1	1	217	198	+19	13	Championship Play-Off
3	KA/Þór	7	5	1	1	198	181	+17	11	Championship Play-Off
4	Haukar	8	4	1	3	220	215	+5	9	Championship Play-Off
5	Kópavogs	8	3	1	4	190	199	−9	7	Championship Play-Off
6	Stjarnan	8	2	0	6	191	215	−24	4	Championship Play-Off
7	ÍBV	7	2	0	5	180	183	−3	4	
8	Afturelding	8	0	0	8	165	230	−65	0	Relegated

Updated to match(es) played on 22 November 2021. Source:
Rules for classification: 1) points; 2) Goal difference; 3) Goals scored.
