= 2017–18 Úrvalsdeild kvenna (handball) =

Úrvalsdeild kvenna
- Season: 2017–18
- Champion: Fram
- Relegated: Grótta, Fjölnir
- Top goalscorer: (Iceland) Ragnheiður Júlíusdóttir (147 goals)
- All statistics correct as of 8 May 2018.

The 2017–18 Úrvalsdeild kvenna, known as the Olís-deildin for sponsorship reasons, is the 79th season of the Úrvalsdeild kvenna, Iceland's premier women's handball league. Fram won its second straight championship by beating Valur in the Úrvalsdeild finals, three games to one. Steinunn Björnsdóttir was named the playoffs MVP.

HK beat Grótta in the relegation finals, taking its place in the 2018–19 Úrvalsdeild kvenna.

== Regular season ==
=== Standings ===
Pos	Team	Pld	W	D	L	GF	GA	GD	Pts	Qualification or relegation
1	Valur	26	21	2	3	575	456	+119	44	Division Champion + Championship Play-Off
2	Fram	21	15	2	4	620	485	+135	32	Championship Play-Off
3	ÍBV	21	14	2	5	621	518	+103	30	Championship Play-Off
4	Haukar	21	14	2	5	520	463	+57	30	Championship Play-Off
5	Stjarnan	21	10	1	10	594	564	+30	21	
6	Selfoss	21	4	1	16	451	566	−115	9	
7	Grótta	21	2	2	17	439	599	−160	6	Relegation Play-Off
8	Fjölnir (R)	21	2	2	17	434	603	−169	6	Relegated

Updated to match(es) played on 8 May 2018. Source:
Rules for classification: 1) points; 2) Goal difference; 3) Goals scored.
(R) Relegated

== Top goal scorers ==
As of matches played on 9 March 2018

=== Regular season ===
Rank	Player	Club	Goals
1	(Iceland) Ragnheiður Júlíusdóttir	Fram	147
2	(Iceland) Ester Óskarsdóttir	ÍBV	123
3	(Iceland) Sandra Erlingsdóttir	ÍBV	122
4	(Iceland) Ramune Pekarskyte	Stjarnan	109
5	(Iceland) Karólína Bæhrenz Lárudóttir	ÍBV	106
5	(Iceland) Andrea Jacobsen	Fjölnir	106
7	(Portugal) Maria Ines Da Silva Pereira	Haukar	101
8	(Iceland) Perla Ruth Albertsdóttir	Selfoss	100
8	(Iceland) Lovísa Thompson	Grótta	100
10	(Iceland) Þórey Rósa Stefánsdóttir	Fram	98

== Playoffs ==
The playoffs are played between the four first qualified teams with a 1-1-1-1-1 format, playing seeded teams games 1, 3 and 5 at home.

=== Bracket ===
Semifinals
1	Valur	3
4	Haukar	2
2	Fram	3
3	ÍBV	1

Finals
1	Valur	1
2	Fram	3

Source: HSÍ
