= 2024 IHF Women's U18 Handball World Championship squads =

This article displays the squads for the 2024 IHF Women's U18 Handball World Championship in China. Each team consisted of a maximum of 18 players.

Age, club, appearances and goals correct as of 14 August 2024.

== Group A ==
=== Austria ===
The final squad was announced on 8 August 2024.

Head coach: Simona Spiridon

No.	Pos.	Name	Date of birth (age)	Height	App.	Goals	Club
1	GK	Michelle Jobst	23 July 2006 (aged 18)	1.62 m	12	0	(Austria) HIB Handball Graz
2	CB	Emilia Brändle	24 August 2006 (aged 17)	1.75 m	16	47	(Austria) SSV Dornbirn Schoren
3	RB	Lorena Baljak	24 October 2006 (aged 17)	1.68 m	30	107	(Switzerland) LC Brühl Handball
4	LB	Andrea Barnjak	18 March 2007 (aged 17)	1.79 m	25	82	(Austria) Hypo Niederösterreich
5	RW	Philomena Egger	1 May 2007 (aged 17)	1.77 m	21	108	(Slovenia) RK Krim
8	CB	Leonie Neunteufel	4 January 2006 (aged 18)	1.67 m	27	80	(Austria) MGA Fivers
9	LB	Viktoria Polanszky	15 April 2006 (aged 18)	1.79 m	37	89	(Austria) Hypo Niederösterreich
12	GK	Nina Plavotic	28 January 2006 (aged 18)	1.76 m	25	4	(Austria) Hypo Niederösterreich
13	LB	Lena Schieber	25 April 2006 (aged 18)	1.81 m	11	13	(Austria) HIB Handball Graz
14	CB	Rebecca Chroust	22 July 2007 (aged 17)	1.67 m	20	43	(Austria) Hypo Niederösterreich
15	LW	Leonie Arnold	20 October 2007 (aged 16)	1.64 m	18	23	(Austria) UHC Tulln
17	P	Rebecca Rappitsch	26 February 2006 (aged 18)	1.71 m	13	15	(Austria) HC BW Feldkirch
18	P	Rebecca Paul	19 October 2006 (aged 17)	1.72 m	21	17	(Switzerland) LC Brühl Handball
21	LB	Martina Maticevic	12 November 2006 (aged 17)	1.80 m	10	29	(Austria) Union St. Pölten
25	RW	Ellonie Ziske	11 April 2007 (aged 17)	1.73 m	0	0	(Austria) UHC Graz
27	P	Aurelie Egbaimo	27 May 2007 (aged 17)	1.83 m	17	46	(Austria) Hypo Niederösterreich

=== Chile ===
The final squad was announced on 6 August 2024.

Head coach: José Tham

No.	Pos.	Name	Date of birth (age)	Height	App.	Goals	Club
2	CB	Macarena Barraza	29 June 2008 (aged 16)	1.60 m	0	0	(Chile) Italiano BM
3	CB	Catalina González	26 April 2008 (aged 16)	1.65 m	0	0	(Chile) Ovalle BM
4	P	Colomba Canessa	10 May 2006 (aged 18)	1.75 m	7	4	(Chile) Italiano BM
5	GK	Daniela Asenjo	14 January 2006 (aged 18)	1.68 m	0	0	(Chile) Italiano BM
6	LW	Noa Mayhuay	15 January 2007 (aged 17)	1.68 m	0	0	(Chile) Ovalle BM
7	CB	Estefanía Baeza	10 May 2007 (aged 17)	1.63 m	0	0	(Chile) DPV Kutral
9	RB	Anaís Larenas	20 May 2007 (aged 17)	1.71 m	7	12	(Chile) BM San Carlos
10	LB	Isidora Valdivieso	10 February 2007 (aged 17)	1.74 m	7	23	(Chile) Italiano BM
11	LB	Renata Lizana	6 June 2006 (aged 18)	1.72 m	7	12	(Chile) Ovalle BM
13	P	Noelia Carrasco	2 March 2007 (aged 17)	1.74 m	7	0	(Chile) BM Punta Arenas
14	LW	Antonia Millán	14 March 2006 (aged 18)	1.74 m	7	0	(Chile) Italiano BM
16	GK	Karina Ulloa	12 April 2006 (aged 18)	1.73 m	0	0	(Spain) Sant Joan Despí
28	LB	Anneliese Almasio	21 January 2008 (aged 16)	1.70 m	0	0	(Chile) Cubla
31	RW	Antonia Fuentes	31 January 2009 (aged 15)	1.65 m	0	0	(Chile) Newen Renca
33	CB	Renata Campos	8 August 2006 (aged 18)	1.66 m	7	15	(Chile) Cubla
36	GK	Isabella Gore	30 July 2007 (aged 17)	1.80 m	7	0	(Chile) Ovalle BM

=== Serbia ===
The final squad was announced on 12 August 2024.

Head coach: Zoran Barbulović

No.	Pos.	Name	Date of birth (age)	Height	App.	Goals	Club
2	CB	Sara Drinić	27 October 2006 (aged 17)	1.67 m	0	0	(Serbia) ŽRK Vojvodina
3	RW	Mia Nedeljković	14 September 2006 (aged 17)	1.60 m	7	20	(Serbia) ORK Beograd
5	LB	Milica Momčilović	10 January 2006 (aged 18)	1.85 m	7	12	(Serbia) ORK Beograd
6	RB	Helena Petrić	6 June 2006 (aged 18)	1.77 m	7	12	(Serbia) ŽORK Jagodina
7	LW	Sabina Šerifi	9 December 2006 (aged 17)	1.64 m	7	22	(Serbia) ŽJRK Bor RTB
8	P	Tara Marinović	12 September 2006 (aged 17)	1.77 m	11	3	(Serbia) ŽJRK Bor RTB
10	P	Aleksandra Krezović	20 April 2007 (aged 17)	1.78 m	9	11	(Serbia) ORK Beograd
15	LB	Sara Radović	9 January 2006 (aged 18)	1.72 m	7	43	(Serbia) ŽJRK Bor RTB
16	GK	Anja Petrović	5 November 2008 (aged 15)	1.74 m	0	0	(Serbia) RK Junior
18	LB	Lena Janković	11 May 2007 (aged 17)	1.74 m	7	8	(Serbia) RK Beograd
19	CB	Leana Milosavljević	19 June 2007 (aged 17)	1.75 m	0	0	(France) Stella Saint-Maur Handball
22	CB	Milica Otašević	19 May 2007 (aged 17)	1.70 m	4	3	(Serbia) ŽRK Železničar
25	RB	Lara Stanić	23 March 2006 (aged 18)	1.65 m	0	0	(Croatia) RK Lokomotiva Zagreb
37	P	Milica Tasić	22 July 2006 (aged 18)	1.78 m	0	0	(Serbia) ŽJRK Bor RTB
44	LW	Mia Đekić	4 February 2008 (aged 16)	1.72 m	0	0	(Serbia) ŽRK Metalac
77	GK	Jana Tanović	26 July 2007 (aged 17)	1.78 m	7	0	(Serbia) RK Beograd
91	GK	Tatjana Činku	10 February 2006 (aged 18)	1.78 m	29	0	(Serbia) ŽRK Železničar

=== Sweden ===
The final squad was announced on 1 August 2024.

Head coach: Frenne Båverud

No.	Pos.	Name	Date of birth (age)	Height	App.	Goals	Club
1	GK	Mathilda Melin	17 June 2006 (aged 18)	1.68 m	9	1	(Sweden) Skuru IK
2	LW	Linnea Kindahl	2 November 2006 (aged 17)	1.65 m	9	19	(Sweden) Alingsås HK
3	CB	Moa Svensson	2 March 2007 (aged 17)	1.60 m	0	0	(Sweden) Kärra HF
6	CB	Nova Huselius	18 March 2007 (aged 17)	1.67 m	7	28	(Sweden) IK Sävehof
8	RW	Julia Berglund	18 February 2006 (aged 18)	1.70 m	7	6	(Sweden) HK Aranäs
9	LB	Meja Norrgård	4 March 2007 (aged 17)	1.73 m	0	0	(Sweden) Skövde HF
10	CB	Astrid Löf	29 July 2006 (aged 18)	1.75 m	13	17	(Sweden) Lugi HF
11	RB	Cassandra Mielke	17 July 2006 (aged 18)	1.70 m	7	27	(Sweden) IK Sävehof
12	GK	Wilma Saul	5 June 2006 (aged 18)	1.85 m	9	0	(Sweden) IK Sävehof
14	LB	Ellen Andersson	7 December 2006 (aged 17)	1.73 m	2	1	(Sweden) Eslövs IK
15	LB	Isa Lindberg	28 January 2007 (aged 17)	1.86 m	3	10	(Sweden) Ystads IF
18	GK	Anna Danielsson	6 July 2006 (aged 18)	1.84 m	14	2	(Sweden) Lugi HF
17	P	Maja Portillo	23 June 2006 (aged 18)	1.85 m	3	3	(Sweden) IK Sävehof
18	P	Isabelle Rydén	26 November 2006 (aged 17)	1.78 m	14	22	(Sweden) Önnereds HK
32	LB	Smilla Lilja	31 July 2007 (aged 17)	1.78 m	0	0	(Sweden) H 65 Höör
33	RW	Thella Johansson	5 November 2006 (aged 17)	1.80 m	3	5	(Sweden) Skövde HF

== Group B ==
=== Angola ===
The final squad was announced on 13 August 2024.

Head coach: Kátia Santos

No.	Pos.	Name	Date of birth (age)	Height	App.	Goals	Club
1	GK	Kelvia Domingos	26 January 2007 (aged 17)	1.76 m	0	0	(Angola) Casa do Pessoal do Porto do Lobito
2	RW	Carla Lussende	6 February 2006 (aged 18)	1.73 m	0	0	(Angola) Primeiro de Agosto
4	P	Ivete Nunes	16 January 2007 (aged 17)	1.70 m	0	0	(Angola) Casa do Pessoal do Porto do Lobito
5	RB	Rubi Bumba	11 February 2006 (aged 18)	1.65 m	0	0	(Angola) Primeiro de Agosto
7	LB	Maria Castro	25 March 2007 (aged 17)	1.75 m	0	0	(Angola) Mendonça Sport
8	CB	Beatriz Pereira	29 June 2007 (aged 17)	1.66 m	0	0	(Angola) Perola da Baia
9	RW	Arísia Malagi	19 February 2007 (aged 17)	1.62 m	0	0	(Angola) Primeiro de Agosto
10	LW	Constantina Domingos	8 March 2006 (aged 18)	1.50 m	0	0	(Angola) Maculusso
11	LW	Paloma Cambuta	8 March 2006 (aged 18)	1.65 m	0	0	(Angola) Primeiro de Agosto
12	GK	Joice Maia	7 July 2006 (aged 18)	1.70 m	0	0	(Angola) Mendonça Sport
15	P	Patrícia Paulino	7 July 2006 (aged 18)	1.60 m	0	0	(Angola) Primeiro de Agosto
20	CB	Vilma Manuel	20 August 2006 (aged 17)	1.73 m	0	0	(Angola) Primeiro de Agosto
22	GK	Elizandra Domingos	5 July 2006 (aged 18)	1.66 m	0	0	(Angola) Primeiro de Agosto
23	CB	Matutuzila Afonso	18 September 2006 (aged 17)	1.65 m	0	0	(Angola) Primeiro de Agosto
32	RB	Sandra Lopes	10 October 2007 (aged 16)	1.73 m	0	0	(Angola) Primeiro de Agosto
90	LB	Balbina Nunda	29 October 2006 (aged 17)	1.73 m	7	31	(Angola) Primeiro de Agosto

=== Croatia ===
The final squad was announced on 1 August 2024.

Head coach: Vedran Krkač

No.	Pos.	Name	Date of birth (age)	Height	App.	Goals	Club
1	GK	Lara Pudić	8 March 2006 (aged 18)	1.72 m	32	1	(Croatia) RK Lokomotiva Zagreb
3	LB	Una Ivančić	12 December 2006 (aged 17)	1.78 m	14	2	(Croatia) ŽRK Koka
4	LW	Katja Vuković	13 September 2006 (aged 17)	1.71 m	40	169	(Croatia) RK Podravka Koprivnica
5	RB	Antea Čičak	13 August 2007 (aged 17)	1.72 m	25	51	(Croatia) RK Lokomotiva Zagreb
7	RW	Lucija Renić	17 April 2006 (aged 18)	1.62 m	31	90	(Croatia) RK Lokomotiva Zagreb
8	CB	Ivana Fratnik	26 October 2006 (aged 17)	1.80 m	31	135	(Croatia) RK Lokomotiva Zagreb
11	LB	Mirna Brusić	19 April 2006 (aged 18)	1.75 m	30	27	(Croatia) ŽRK Zamet
12	GK	Nika Kraljević	17 March 2006 (aged 18)	1.84 m	28	0	(Croatia) RK Lokomotiva Zagreb
13	P	Lucija Grozdanić	30 June 2006 (aged 18)	1.69 m	19	2	(Croatia) ŽRK Zamet
15	P	Veronika Babara	21 June 2006 (aged 18)	1.74 m	35	30	(Croatia) RK Lokomotiva Zagreb
16	GK	Marta Turkalj	17 May 2006 (aged 18)	1.78 m	16	1	(Croatia) ŽRK Bjelovar
17	CB	Nina Burđelez	10 March 2007 (aged 17)	1.75 m	22	38	(Croatia) RK Dalmatinka
18	LB	Josipa Zubac	11 December 2006 (aged 17)	1.77 m	23	22	(Croatia) RK Lokomotiva Zagreb
19	LB	Gabriela Milić	22 November 2007 (aged 16)	1.75 m	20	7	(Croatia) RK Dugopolje
21	LB	Tara Đelekovčan	25 May 2006 (aged 18)	1.78 m	32	85	(Croatia) RK Podravka Koprivnica
24	LB	Anđelina Bouček	28 October 2006 (aged 17)	1.89 m	27	43	(Croatia) RK Lokomotiva Zagreb
25	RB	Dora Dananić	16 July 2006 (aged 18)	1.74 m	4	0	(Croatia) RK Zelina
28	P	Klara Marendić	22 December 2006 (aged 17)	1.75 m	4	8	(Croatia) ŽRK Split 2010

=== Montenegro ===
The final squad was announced on 13 August 2024.

Head coach: Tatjana Jeraminok

No.	Pos.	Name	Date of birth (age)	Height	App.	Goals	Club
1	GK	Teodora Rončević	11 August 2006 (aged 18)	1.86 m	10	0	(Montenegro) ŽRK Budućnost Podgorica
2	LW	Sanja Andrijašević	4 December 2007 (aged 16)	1.68 m	8	5	(Montenegro) RK Levalea 2010
5	CB	Milka Pavlović	20 July 2006 (aged 18)	1.79 m	10	13	(Montenegro) ŽRK Budućnost Podgorica
6	LB	Dunja Jolić	18 March 2006 (aged 18)	1.77 m	10	12	(Montenegro) ŽRK Budućnost Podgorica
7	CB	Natalija Lekić	13 April 2007 (aged 17)	1.74 m	10	5	(Montenegro) RK Rudar Pljevlja
8	RB	Ksenija Kuzman	2 June 2007 (aged 17)	1.77 m	10	15	(Montenegro) ŽRK Budućnost Podgorica
9	RB	Maja Ceklić	18 May 2007 (aged 17)	1.76 m	12	26	(Montenegro) RK Zeta
10	LW	Bojana Peličić	22 February 2006 (aged 18)	1.72 m	10	4	(Montenegro) ŽRK Budućnost Podgorica
11	P	Anđela Guberinić	14 May 2006 (aged 18)	1.77 m	10	25	(Montenegro) ŽRK Budućnost Podgorica
12	GK	Lucija Jovanović	6 December 2007 (aged 16)	1.84 m	10	0	(Montenegro) ŽRK Budućnost Podgorica
13	CB	Nina Ramusović	18 July 2007 (aged 17)	1.75 m	12	26	(Montenegro) RK Rudar Pljevlja
15	CB	Mina Petrović	3 July 2006 (aged 18)	1.75 m	10	4	(Montenegro) ŽRK Budućnost Podgorica
17	LB	Elena Mitrović	22 December 2006 (aged 17)	1.87 m	10	37	(Montenegro) ŽRK Budućnost Podgorica
19	RB	Sara Folić	18 June 2007 (aged 17)	1.74 m	0	0	(Montenegro) ŽRK Budućnost Podgorica
20	P	Ksenija Gašević	17 January 2006 (aged 18)	1.87 m	10	10	(Montenegro) ŽRK Budućnost Podgorica
23	GK	Mia Vuksanović	14 December 2008 (aged 15)	1.80 m	0	0	(Montenegro) ŽRK Budućnost Podgorica
27	RW	Ana Banović	18 September 2006 (aged 17)	1.70 m	0	0	(Montenegro) ŽRK Budućnost Podgorica

=== Nigeria ===
The final squad was announced on 12 August 2024.

Head coach: Adewunmi Olumide Shittu

No.	Pos.	Name	Date of birth (age)	Height	App.	Goals	Club
1	GK	Kehinde Babatunde	25 April 2006 (aged 18)	1.70 m	5	0	(Nigeria) Aspac HBC
3	CB	Rahima Bello	1 October 2006 (aged 17)	1.57 m	0	0	(Nigeria) Sokoto Rima
4	LB	Taiwo Babatunde	25 April 2006 (aged 18)	1.63 m	5	15	(Nigeria) Seasiders Babe
5	RB	Esther Mathew	14 April 2006 (aged 18)	1.59 m	5	11	(Nigeria) Addija HBC
10	P	Damilola Akinlade	26 June 2006 (aged 18)	1.62 m	0	0	(Nigeria) Rivers Queens
11	RW	Lucy Onyekwere	31 January 2007 (aged 17)	1.65 m	0	0	(Nigeria) Sokoto Rima
12	GK	Precious Samuel	20 December 2006 (aged 17)	1.62 m	0	0	(Nigeria) Sokoto Rima
17	LB	Prudence Samuel	11 November 2007 (aged 16)	1.58 m	0	0	(Nigeria) Sokoto Rima
20	LW	Amina Muhammad	1 September 2006 (aged 17)	1.61 m	0	0	(Nigeria) Sokoto Rima
23	RW	Blessing Igbenedion	25 December 2008 (aged 15)	1.50 m	0	0	(Nigeria) Delta Force
25	LW	Joan Okolo	25 December 2006 (aged 17)	1.60 m	0	0	(Nigeria) Delta Force
26	RB	Chidera Ogbusimba	1 August 2006 (aged 18)	1.55 m	0	0	(Nigeria) Sokoto Rima
30	LB	Amarachi Oparaugo	6 June 2006 (aged 18)	1.70 m	0	0	(Nigeria) Imo Grasshoppers
33	CB	Ijeoma Izuoba	6 June 2007 (aged 17)	1.60 m	0	0	(Nigeria) Delta Force

== Group C ==
=== Canada ===
The final squad was announced on 28 July 2024.

Head coach: Eric Choquette

No.	Pos.	Name	Date of birth (age)	Height	App.	Goals	Club
4	RW	Maxim Reid	27 March 2007 (aged 17)	1.60 m	0	0	(Canada) Club de Handball de Lévis
5	CB	Ophély Chagnon	19 October 2006 (aged 17)	1.63 m	0	0	(Canada) Club de Handball de Drummondville
6	LW	Annabelle Reny	29 March 2007 (aged 17)	1.71 m	0	0	(Canada) Club de Handball de Lévis
7	CB	Amélie Leclair	25 July 2008 (aged 16)	1.72 m	0	0	(Canada) Club de handball Champlain
8	LW	Doriane Blais	17 August 2006 (aged 17)	1.60 m	0	0	(Canada) Club de Handball de Lévis
9	P	Gabrielle Landry	21 October 2006 (aged 17)	1.65 m	0	0	(Canada) Club de Handball de Lévis
10	LB	Hadyle Ben Hassin	10 February 2006 (aged 18)	1.73 m	0	0	(Canada) Club de handball Champlain
11	RB	Emma Rozon	11 September 2008 (aged 15)	1.70 m	0	0	(France) Mérignac Handball
12	GK	Rosemary Janelle	7 October 2007 (aged 16)	1.68 m	0	0	(Canada) Club de Handball de Drummondville
13	GK	Aurélie Bouly	23 December 2006 (aged 17)	1.60 m	0	0	(Canada) Handball Laval
14	CB	Florence Boisclair	28 December 2006 (aged 17)	1.63 m	0	0	(Canada) Club de Handball de Drummondville
15	RW	Sofia Rioux	30 October 2008 (aged 15)	1.68 m	0	0	(Canada) Handball Laval
16	GK	Alice Florescu	31 January 2007 (aged 17)	1.70 m	0	0	(Canada) Club de handball Champlain
19	P	Clara Halus-Udrea	17 May 2007 (aged 17)	1.70 m	0	0	(Canada) Handball Laval
20	P	Brynn Von Kuster	20 September 2007 (aged 16)	1.70 m	0	0	(Canada) Avengers Handball Club
22	RB	Mahély Lemaire	28 June 2006 (aged 18)	1.68 m	0	0	(Canada) Club de Handball de Drummondville
26	LB	Chloé Fournier	26 March 2006 (aged 18)	1.80 m	0	0	(Canada) Club de Handball Celtique de Montréal
37	CB	Katarina Vrdoljak	5 February 2006 (aged 18)	1.75 m	0	0	(Canada) Handball Laval

=== Japan ===
The final squad was announced on 2 August 2024.

Head coach: Jang So-hee

No.	Pos.	Name	Date of birth (age)	Height	App.	Goals	Club
1	GK	Hirari Fujiwara	19 March 2006 (aged 18)	1.71 m	5	0	(Japan) University of Tsukuba
2	LB	Yui Yasugahira	23 January 2006 (aged 18)	1.68 m	6	21	(Japan) Kokushikan University
4	RW	Ayaka Hikida	12 March 2006 (aged 18)	1.56 m	5	14	(Japan) Kwansei Gakuin University
5	LW	Sarina Oyama	22 February 2006 (aged 18)	1.60 m	0	0	(Japan) Fukuoka University
6	LB	Haruhi Samo	21 April 2006 (aged 18)	1.67 m	6	11	(Japan) Hokusei Gakuen University
8	CB	Ami Kuramochi	27 January 2007 (aged 17)	1.54 m	0	0	(Japan) Showa Gakuin High School
10	RB	Yume Matsumoto	19 June 2006 (aged 18)	1.67 m	6	25	(Japan) Kosei Gakuen Girls High School
11	RW	Arisa Kawakami	19 July 2006 (aged 18)	1.54 m	5	19	(Japan) Chiharadai High School
12	GK	Hana Osaki	15 January 2007 (aged 17)	1.54 m	5	19	(Japan) Takamizu High School
13	RB	Yuri Zukeyama	7 August 2006 (aged 18)	1.70 m	5	8	(Japan) Koza High School
14	CB	Mami Nakamura	24 August 2006 (aged 17)	1.62 m	6	21	(Japan) Showa Gakuin High School
16	GK	Karen Sekiguchi	2 August 2006 (aged 18)	1.75 m	0	0	(Japan) Showa Gakuin High School
17	RB	Kaede Abe	7 September 2006 (aged 17)	1.63 m	6	15	(Japan) Seiwa Gakuen High School
18	LW	Jurina Kio	9 September 2006 (aged 17)	1.65 m	6	33	(Japan) Shiraume Gakuen High School
19	RB	Miku Muramatsu	23 October 2006 (aged 17)	1.58 m	0	0	(Japan) Kozukata High School
23	P	Ai Nakao	27 February 2006 (aged 18)	1.75 m	6	16	(Japan) Osaka University of Health and Sport Sciences
24	LB	Aoi Takahashi	14 June 2006 (aged 18)	1.70 m	6	11	(Japan) Tomioka Jitsugyo High School
25	P	Mao Kato	30 August 2006 (aged 17)	1.78 m	6	19	(Japan) Showa Gakuin High School

=== Netherlands ===
The final squad was announced on 31 July 2024.

Head coach: Robert Nijdam

No.	Pos.	Name	Date of birth (age)	Height	App.	Goals	Club
2	GK	Anne de Boer	14 February 2007 (aged 17)	1.83 m	24	2	(Netherlands) Juro Unirek/VZV
3	GK	Cindy van Horssen	1 January 2006 (aged 18)	1.80 m	9	1	(Netherlands) Westfriesland/SEW
5	RW	Esmeralda Mallo	5 August 2007 (aged 17)	1.65 m	13	20	(Netherlands) Westfriesland/SEW
6	RB	Iyem Pelzer	30 April 2006 (aged 18)	1.68 m	13	20	(Netherlands) Beekse Fusie Club
8	LW	Robin van Galen	10 July 2006 (aged 18)	1.70 m	18	23	(Netherlands) VOC Amsterdam
9	LB	Fleur Schouten	24 October 2006 (aged 17)	1.78 m	21	37	(Netherlands) Westfriesland/SEW
10	CB	Femke Kleijkers	6 September 2006 (aged 17)	1.75 m	8	70	(Netherlands) Geonius/V&L
11	LW	Robin Grooten	1 February 2006 (aged 18)	1.70 m	20	23	(Netherlands) Geonius/V&L
12	CB	Jane van der Raaij	11 May 2008 (aged 16)	1.67 m	9	1	(Netherlands) VOC Amsterdam
13	CB	Frencis Portengen	19 June 2006 (aged 18)	1.73 m	16	33	(Germany) Borussia Dortmund
14	RB	Maud Horvers	7 March 2006 (aged 18)	1.82 m	19	83	(Netherlands) VOC Amsterdam
15	P	Fenna Kemp	15 June 2007 (aged 17)	1.80 m	0	0	(Netherlands) Cabooter Fortes/Venlo
16	CB	Sophie Buijs	13 March 2006 (aged 18)	1.75 m	61	26	(Netherlands) VOC Amsterdam
18	P	Anne Schouten	18 October 2007 (aged 16)	1.75 m	21	15	(Netherlands) VOC Amsterdam
19	RW	Silke van Kleef	13 October 2007 (aged 16)	1.65 m	10	5	(Netherlands) Garage Kil/Volendam
21	LB	Alyssa Borregana	25 July 2007 (aged 17)	1.70 m	8	6	(Netherlands) VOC Amsterdam

=== South Korea ===
The final squad was announced on 11 August 2024.

Head coach: Woo Sun-hee

No.	Pos.	Name	Date of birth (age)	Height	App.	Goals	Club
2	RW	Shin Ye-eun	8 February 2008 (aged 16)	1.61 m	0	0	(South Korea) Daejeon Physical Education High School
7	RB	Cho Seo-yeon	18 September 2006 (aged 17)	1.63 m	0	0	(South Korea) Daejeon Physical Education High School
9	LW	Kim Ji-min	2 August 2007 (aged 17)	1.64 m	0	0	(South Korea) Incheon Business High School
11	LB	Beom Da-bin	3 January 2006 (aged 18)	1.74 m	0	0	(South Korea) Chosun University Girls High School
13	P	Choi Hyo-sung	19 February 2007 (aged 17)	1.70 m	0	0	(South Korea) Daejeon Physical Education High School
14	CB	Kim Ji-young	14 May 2008 (aged 16)	1.66 m	0	0	(South Korea) Hwikyung Girls High School
15	LW	Hwang Da-som	9 July 2006 (aged 18)	1.65 m	0	0	(South Korea) Hwangji Information Industry High School
16	GK	Kim Da-in	6 February 2006 (aged 18)	1.75 m	0	0	(South Korea) Ilshin Girls High School
17	RB	Suh A-young	20 July 2006 (aged 18)	1.68 m	0	0	(South Korea) Muan High School
19	P	Heo Yun-seo	18 July 2006 (aged 18)	1.74 m	0	0	(South Korea) Incheon Business High School
20	RW	Lee Ye-seo	6 August 2007 (aged 17)	1.64 m	0	0	(South Korea) Incheon Business High School
23	CB	Kim Bo-kyeong	28 October 2006 (aged 17)	1.58 m	0	0	(South Korea) Incheon Business High School
24	LW	Kim Su-yeon	16 July 2006 (aged 18)	1.73 m	0	0	(South Korea) Daejeon Physical Education High School
28	CB	Lee Jin-seo	7 March 2007 (aged 17)	1.65 m	0	0	(South Korea) Hwangji Information Industry High School
29	LB	Ku Hyeon-ji	25 September 2006 (aged 17)	1.78 m	0	0	(South Korea) Daegu Physical Education High School
77	GK	Go Chae-eun	23 February 2007 (aged 17)	1.79 m	0	0	(South Korea) Daejeon Physical Education High School

== Group D ==
=== Brazil ===
The final squad was announced on 13 August 2024.

Head coach: Mauricio Antonucci

No.	Pos.	Name	Date of birth (age)	Height	App.	Goals	Club
2	RB	Júlia Vitória	28 March 2006 (aged 18)	1.68 m	5	11	(Brazil) Centro Esportivo Suzano Costa
5	RW	Ana Karolina	9 January 2006 (aged 18)	1.65 m	5	15	(Brazil) Clube Português do Recife
6	RW	Jisseli Silva	27 September 2007 (aged 16)	1.69 m	10	26	(Brazil) Esporte Clube Pinheiros
8	LW	Maria Dovigo	19 April 2007 (aged 17)	1.78 m	10	13	(Brazil) Esporte Clube Pinheiros
9	CB	Lauendy Vitor	31 October 2007 (aged 16)	1.68 m	10	18	(Brazil) Esporte Clube Pinheiros
11	LB	Joyce De Sousa	24 October 2007 (aged 16)	1.64 m	10	24	(Brazil) Carajás Handebol
13	CB	Leticia Fúculo	28 June 2007 (aged 17)	1.64 m	10	14	(Brazil) Esporte Clube Pinheiros
16	GK	Mellysse Rocha	30 June 2006 (aged 18)	1.80 m	5	2	(Brazil) Centro Esportivo Suzano Costa
17	P	Beatriz Soares	7 May 2006 (aged 18)	1.75 m	5	12	(Brazil) Esporte Clube Pinheiros
18	RB	Andressa Souza	8 March 2006 (aged 18)	1.69 m	5	12	(Brazil) Esporte Clube Pinheiros
20	LW	Nhauany De Castro	10 March 2007 (aged 17)	1.69 m	10	14	(Brazil) Centro Esportivo Suzano Costa
23	CB	Sofia Van Lieshout	18 January 2006 (aged 18)	1.74 m	5	4	(Netherlands) RKHV Quintus
25	LB	Raquel Ladeia	14 September 2006 (aged 17)	1.71 m	5	16	(Brazil) Clube Português do Recife
27	GK	Sophia Kieling	10 April 2007 (aged 17)	1.74 m	10	0	(Brazil) ATHB Hand Torres
28	P	Luana Flores	2 March 2006 (aged 18)	1.68 m	5	12	(Brazil) ATHB Hand Torres
77	LB	Giulia Lessa	26 January 2006 (aged 18)	1.72 m	5	5	(Brazil) Clube Português do Recife

=== France ===
The final squad was announced on 30 July 2024.

Head coach: Olivier De Lafuente

No.	Pos.	Name	Date of birth (age)	Height	App.	Goals	Club
1	GK	Léane Gonzalez	6 July 2007 (aged 17)	1.75 m	10	0	(France) Metz Handball
4	RW	Blandine Gros	31 March 2006 (aged 18)	1.69 m	8	16	(France) Stade Pessacais Union Club Handball
5	LW	Corentine Senant	8 February 2006 (aged 18)	1.70 m	10	21	(France) Brest Bretagne Handball
6	CB	Agathe Clerc	16 June 2006 (aged 18)	1.73 m	6	6	(France) ESBF Besançon
7	RW	Dawlya Abdou	3 May 2006 (aged 18)	1.68 m	10	12	(France) Toulouse
8	LW	Liyah Naal	27 March 2007 (aged 17)	1.68 m	10	19	(France) Noisy-le-Grand Handball
9	LW	Zeina Injai	10 September 2007 (aged 16)	1.79 m	8	14	(France) Stella Saint-Maur Handball
10	CB	Claire Koestner	10 February 2006 (aged 18)	1.68 m	10	20	(France) Metz Handball
11	RW	Emma Bureu-Cruz	17 May 2007 (aged 17)	1.74 m	0	0	(France) Bordes Sport handball
12	GK	Lisa Joyet Bondue	20 January 2006 (aged 18)	1.78 m	10	0	(France) Roz Hand'Du 29
13	P	Eléa Ferdilus	1 June 2007 (aged 17)	1.77 m	10	16	(France) Yutz Handball
15	LB	Julilove Andon	24 May 2006 (aged 18)	1.74 m	10	18	(France) Paris 92
16	GK	Romane Gindro	28 February 2007 (aged 17)	1.83 m	2	0	(France) Entente Saône Mamirolle
17	CB	Mélissa Chantelly	21 March 2006 (aged 18)	1.73 m	10	9	(France) Mérignac Handball
18	LB	Léane Alcée	24 July 2006 (aged 18)	1.84 m	10	21	(France) Paris 92
19	P	Lalie Lambet	25 March 2006 (aged 18)	1.74 m	9	16	(France) Sambre Avesnois Handball
20	P	Jone Arotçarena-Rosas	7 May 2006 (aged 18)	1.73 m	8	16	(France) Aviron Bayonnais Handball
21	LB	Prunelle Kingué	19 March 2006 (aged 18)	1.80 m	10	18	(France) ESBF Besançon

=== India ===
The final squad was announced on 11 August 2024.

Head coach: Karthikeyan Madanagurusami

No.	Pos.	Name	Date of birth (age)	Height	App.	Goals	Club
3	RW	Tamanna	7 May 2007 (aged 17)	1.62 m	6	3	(India) SAI
4	RB	Muskan Devi	20 January 2006 (aged 18)	1.63 m	8	6	(India) Himachal Pradesh
5	RB	Sujata	30 November 2006 (aged 17)	1.62 m	5	6	(India) SAI
7	LW	Tannu	16 September 2007 (aged 16)	1.68 m	6	8	(India) SAI
8	LB	Kajal	3 January 2008 (aged 16)	1.62 m	3	6	(India) Himachal Pradesh
9	LB	Ishu	11 April 2006 (aged 18)	1.63 m	10	5	(India) SAI
12	RB	Manisha Jat	13 July 2006 (aged 18)	1.65 m	4	6	(India) Rajasthan
13	RB	Muskan	14 August 2008 (aged 16)	1.65 m	7	8	(India) Rajasthan
14	LW	Teena	12 January 2006 (aged 18)	1.65 m	10	9	(India) Rajasthan
15	GK	Arushi	28 June 2007 (aged 17)	1.62 m	8	6	(India) Himachal Pradesh
16	LW	Pooja	7 November 2007 (aged 16)	1.63 m	12	3	(India) Golden Eagle Academy
18	CB	Khushi	17 November 2006 (aged 17)	1.63 m	3	7	(India) Himachal Pradesh
21	CB	Renuka	18 August 2006 (aged 17)	1.62 m	6	3	(India) Haryana
23	RW	Anika	26 August 2006 (aged 17)	1.63 m	10	5	(India) Haryana
24	RW	Kafhi	13 November 2006 (aged 17)	1.62 m	5	6	(India) Haryana
29	GK	Kanika Kumari	22 July 2006 (aged 18)	1.63 m	5	5	(India) Himachal Pradesh
34	P	Vaishnavi Singh	12 July 2009 (aged 15)	1.70 m	6	7	(India) Golden Eagle Academy
35	CB	Lavisha Gahlawat	24 March 2008 (aged 16)	1.70 m	6	8	(India) Chandigarh

=== Kosovo ===
The final squad was announced on 13 August 2024.

Head coach: Mitat Ferati

No.	Pos.	Name	Date of birth (age)	Height	App.	Goals	Club
1	GK	Albina Pllana	24 March 2007 (aged 17)	1.75 m	6	0	(Kosovo) KHF Prishtina
2	LB	Daorsa Bici	19 November 2007 (aged 16)	1.75 m	6	0	(Norway) Langhus IL
5	CB	Orgesa Gola	20 March 2007 (aged 17)	1.64 m	12	6	(Kosovo) KHF Shqiponja
7	P	Arona Krasniqi	19 November 2006 (aged 17)	1.71 m	18	66	(Kosovo) KHF Prishtina
8	LW	Martina Bibaj	21 September 2007 (aged 16)	1.65 m	6	16	(Switzerland) TV Zofingen
9	CB	Sara Gjergjaj	17 May 2006 (aged 18)	1.67 m	12	34	(Switzerland) HSG Leimental
11	LB	Andra Uglani	27 February 2008 (aged 16)	1.75 m	5	18	(Norway) Åssiden IF
12	GK	Alina Shabani	10 September 2007 (aged 16)	1.71 m	6	0	(Germany) HSG Freiburg
15	P	Elona Elin Zeneli	7 May 2008 (aged 16)	1.65 m	0	0	(Sweden) Backa HK
17	P	Klaudia Ukaj	16 December 2006 (aged 17)	1.72 m	6	3	(Switzerland) TV Zofingen
20	P	Laura Maqedonci	6 July 2008 (aged 16)	1.72 m	6	8	(Switzerland) TV Zofingen
21	CB	Zoja Kameraj	21 April 2007 (aged 17)	1.70 m	6	1	(Sweden) Backa HK
22	LB	Diona Dresh	31 January 2006 (aged 18)	1.72 m	6	41	(Norway) Oppegård IL
23	RW	Sara Kameraj	2 March 2009 (aged 15)	1.65 m	6	6	(Sweden) Backa HK
27	LW	Arjeta Imeraj	28 January 2006 (aged 18)	1.61 m	12	38	(Kosovo) KHF Jusuf Gërvalla
31	GK	Lejla Hyseni	27 May 2007 (aged 17)	1.64 m	0	0	(Sweden) HK Malmö

== Group E ==
=== China ===
The final squad was announced on 13 August 2024.

Head coach: Sheng Qiang

No.	Pos.	Name	Date of birth (age)	Height	App.	Goals	Club
1	GK	Sun Yihan	30 April 2006 (aged 18)	1.86 m	7	0	(China) Shandong
2	LW	Hu Jiaxin	19 December 2007 (aged 16)	1.65 m	0	0	(China) Anhui
3	CB	Pan Fengying	26 November 2006 (aged 17)	1.80 m	7	11	(China) Beijing
5	RW	Huang Zidie	18 October 2006 (aged 17)	1.74 m	0	0	(China) Anhui
6	CB	Zhang Jingwen	28 May 2009 (aged 15)	1.66 m	0	0	(China) Jiangsu
8	CB	Liang Jing	14 April 2006 (aged 18)	1.75 m	7	3	(China) Anhui
9	RW	Xin Ying	11 January 2006 (aged 18)	1.70 m	0	0	(China) Beijing
10	RB	Li Xinyi	14 November 2006 (aged 17)	1.78 m	0	0	(China) Shandong
11	RW	Yang Jie	19 May 2006 (aged 18)	1.79 m	0	0	(China) Shandong
12	GK	Guo Zhengmei	15 December 2006 (aged 17)	1.75 m	0	0	(China) Beijing
13	LW	Zhang Qiuyu	12 October 2006 (aged 17)	1.74 m	0	0	(China) Jiangsu
15	P	Yang Yue	15 March 2006 (aged 18)	1.77 m	7	4	(China) Shandong
16	GK	Huang Sitong	20 December 2006 (aged 17)	1.77 m	0	0	(China) Jiangsu
17	P	Liu Yutong	9 January 2008 (aged 16)	1.83 m	0	0	(China) Jiangsu
18	LB	Zhang Jiarui	7 August 2007 (aged 17)	1.78 m	0	0	(China) Jiangsu
19	P	Li Ziai	23 December 2006 (aged 17)	1.76 m	0	0	(China) Jiangsu
21	RB	Xing Ziyan	1 September 2006 (aged 17)	1.76 m	0	0	(China) Jiangsu
23	RB	Zheng Yun	17 January 2007 (aged 17)	1.78 m	0	0	(China) Jiangsu

=== Chinese Taipei ===
The final squad was announced on 1 August 2024.

Head coach: Tan Tsung-sheng

No.	Pos.	Name	Date of birth (age)	Height	App.	Goals	Club
3	RW	Chuan Heng-yi	15 September 2006 (aged 17)	1.59 m	7	1	(Chinese Taipei) New Taipei
6	LW	Chang Fu-ying	30 November 2006 (aged 17)	1.62 m	7	1	(Chinese Taipei) New Taipei
8	RB	Lin Ching	29 October 2006 (aged 17)	1.62 m	7	13	(Chinese Taipei) New Taipei
9	CB	Chen Chen	12 February 2006 (aged 18)	1.56 m	0	0	(Chinese Taipei) New Taipei
10	LB	Yu Chien-yu	7 September 2007 (aged 16)	1.65 m	0	0	(Chinese Taipei) New Taipei
12	GK	Lin Jui-chi	30 October 2007 (aged 16)	1.66 m	0	0	(Chinese Taipei) New Taipei
13	P	Gu Ting-yu	23 March 2006 (aged 18)	1.63 m	0	0	(Chinese Taipei) New Taipei
14	CB	Wu Ching-shiuan	13 February 2007 (aged 17)	1.59 m	0	0	(Chinese Taipei) New Taipei
15	RB	Wang Yu-ting	8 April 2007 (aged 17)	1.68 m	0	0	(Chinese Taipei) New Taipei
18	GK	Fu Yu-jun	1 December 2006 (aged 17)	1.74 m	0	0	(Chinese Taipei) New Taipei
19	RW	Yang Yu-xuan	20 November 2006 (aged 17)	1.56 m	0	0	(Chinese Taipei) New Taipei
77	LB	Hsu Fang-ying	4 December 2006 (aged 17)	1.69 m	7	6	(Chinese Taipei) New Taipei
83	LB	Chang Chih-yu	11 January 2006 (aged 18)	1.56 m	0	0	(Chinese Taipei) New Taipei
91	LB	Lin Yi-jun	11 October 2006 (aged 17)	1.71 m	0	0	(Chinese Taipei) New Taipei
95	CB	Hsu Yun-hsuan	16 August 2006 (aged 17)	1.54 m	0	0	(Chinese Taipei) New Taipei
99	RW	Lin Ling-xuan	24 October 2006 (aged 17)	1.57 m	0	0	(Chinese Taipei) New Taipei

=== Denmark ===
The final squad was announced on 27 June 2024.

Head coach: Ole Bitsch

No.	Pos.	Name	Date of birth (age)	Height	App.	Goals	Club
3	CB	Cecilie Zimmer Hedegaard	30 August 2006 (aged 17)	1.70 m	9	15	(Denmark) Viborg HK
4	LW	Andrea Bjertrup Jensen	2 August 2006 (aged 18)	1.73 m	25	53	(Denmark) Silkeborg-Voel KFUM
6	RW	Emma Røgilds Klæstrup	13 September 2006 (aged 17)	1.70 m	8	13	(Denmark) EH Aalborg
7	LB	Kristine Hoppe	4 July 2006 (aged 18)	1.72 m	6	21	(Denmark) AGF Håndbold
9	LB	Anne Dolberg Plougstrup	22 June 2006 (aged 18)	1.75 m	24	103	(Denmark) Silkeborg-Voel KFUM
10	P	Andrea Münster Schrøder	19 December 2006 (aged 17)	1.75 m	6	4	(Denmark) Ajax København
11	LW	Anna Mulbjerg Kristensen	11 December 2006 (aged 17)	1.67 m	11	24	(Denmark) Frederiksberg IF
15	RB	Julie Groth Persson	15 February 2006 (aged 18)	1.83 m	27	66	(Denmark) GOG Håndbold
16	GK	Freja Fonseca Nielsen	28 March 2006 (aged 18)	1.74 m	25	0	(Denmark) Skanderborg Håndbold
18	P	Emilie Schleicher	3 March 2006 (aged 18)	1.79 m	26	23	(Denmark) Skanderborg Håndbold
19	RW	Ditte Alnor Michelsen	22 December 2006 (aged 17)	1.70 m	8	16	(Denmark) GOG Håndbold
20	GK	Zenia Hald Madsen	8 July 2006 (aged 18)	1.79 m	10	0	(Denmark) AGF Håndbold
21	LB	Signe Bang Andersen	13 April 2006 (aged 18)	1.81 m	12	25	(Denmark) GOG Håndbold
23	P	Caroline Friis Hansen	6 January 2007 (aged 17)	1.79 m	20	15	(Denmark) Vejle Idrætshøjskole
24	CB	Cecilie Frydendahl Nørskov	1 July 2006 (aged 18)	1.73 m	10	30	(Denmark) Skanderborg Håndbold
25	RB	Clara Bro Vejlgaard	23 April 2006 (aged 18)	1.70 m	8	16	(Denmark) Skive fH

=== Greenland ===
The final squad was announced on 5 July 2024.

Head coach: Victoria Budek Svendsen

No.	Pos.	Name	Date of birth (age)	Height	App.	Goals	Club
2	RW	Parma Kreutzmann	10 June 2008 (aged 16)	1.65 m	5	0	(Greenland) GSS
3	RW	Niviaq Skifte Knudsen	22 September 2006 (aged 17)	1.64 m	5	16	(Greenland) GSS
5	LW	Hannah Nielsen Kleist	16 August 2008 (aged 15)	1.68 m	0	0	(Greenland) SAK
6	RB	Bea Mathæussen Jensen	27 April 2009 (aged 15)	1.67 m	5	16	(Greenland) GSS
7	CB	Tukummeq Kleist Berthelsen	18 September 2006 (aged 17)	1.65 m	5	8	(Denmark) Ikast
9	RW	Kira Brandt Petersen	24 October 2008 (aged 15)	1.64 m	0	0	(Greenland) GSS
13	P	Najaaja Rossen Petersen	15 May 2009 (aged 15)	1.74 m	0	0	(Greenland) GSS
14	P	Amáunalik Geisler Møller	1 July 2009 (aged 15)	1.73 m	5	4	(Greenland) SAK
15	LB	Arnannguaq Berthelsen	22 July 2008 (aged 16)	1.75 m	0	0	(Greenland) N-48
16	GK	Jaliina Lund Jakobsen	26 May 2009 (aged 15)	1.69 m	5	0	(Greenland) GSS
17	P	Pilunnguaq Olsen Petersen	18 July 2006 (aged 18)	1.74 m	5	15	(Denmark) FIF
18	GK	Ivaana Ravn Lennert Petersen	2 April 2007 (aged 17)	1.70 m	5	0	(Greenland) GSS
22	RW	Hannah Steenholdt Petersen	9 October 2007 (aged 16)	1.58 m	5	31	(Greenland) GSS
23	CB	Najaaraq Heilmann	5 August 2007 (aged 17)	1.66 m	5	7	(Greenland) GSS
24	P	Nadia Lundblad	3 March 2007 (aged 17)	1.73 m	0	0	(Greenland) GSS
26	CB	Madeline Lundbæk Bjørnestad	26 February 2006 (aged 18)	1.74 m	0	0	(Denmark) Furesø

== Group F ==
=== Argentina ===
The final squad was announced on 19 July 2024.

Head coach: Martín Duhau

No.	Pos.	Name	Date of birth (age)	Height	App.	Goals	Club
1	GK	Josefina Ferraro	5 January 2007 (aged 17)	1.72 m	5	0	(Argentina) Estudiantes de La Plata
4	LB	Simona Manzure	17 February 2006 (aged 18)	1.70 m	0	0	(Argentina) Estudiantes de La Plata
5	LB	Mara Lopez	16 April 2007 (aged 17)	1.80 m	5	9	(Argentina) SAG Lomas
6	CB	Josefina Vitali	12 July 2006 (aged 18)	1.64 m	5	11	(Argentina) Lanús
8	LW	Valentina Trejo	12 May 2006 (aged 18)	1.56 m	5	26	(Argentina) Lanús
9	LB	Selena Maitini	9 February 2006 (aged 18)	1.80 m	5	18	(Argentina) Estudiantes de La Plata
13	P	Mara Ventos	11 November 2006 (aged 17)	1.73 m	5	8	(Argentina) Lanús
14	LB	Isabella Patrone	7 February 2007 (aged 17)	1.72 m	5	19	(Argentina) Sedalo
15	RW	Celeste Barbaglia	2 January 2007 (aged 17)	1.71 m	0	0	(Argentina) Dorrego
16	RW	Delfina Arzola	6 October 2006 (aged 17)	1.62 m	5	9	(Argentina) VILo
19	RB	Milagros Schneider	30 April 2007 (aged 17)	1.76 m	0	0	(Argentina) Belgrano de San Nicolás
22	LW	Catalina Losarcos	4 January 2007 (aged 17)	1.64 m	5	14	(Argentina) Sedalo
24	RB	Helena Molina	30 October 2006 (aged 17)	1.82 m	5	23	(Argentina) Quilmes
40	GK	Lola Nuñez Fridmanas	1 February 2006 (aged 18)	1.74 m	5	0	(Argentina) Vélez Sarsfield
42	P	Lara Della Ratta	27 February 2006 (aged 18)	1.76 m	0	0	(Argentina) SAG Lomas
49	CB	Mailen Sokalski	13 December 2007 (aged 16)	1.72 m	5	4	(Argentina) Quilmes

=== Hungary ===
The final squad was announced on 31 July 2024.

Head coach: Beáta Bohus

No.	Pos.	Name	Date of birth (age)	Height	App.	Goals	Club
2	RW	Dalma Varga	16 December 2006 (aged 17)	1.60 m	36	6	(Hungary) Győri ETO KC
4	LW	Hanna Mihály	13 June 2007 (aged 17)	1.70 m	6	2	(Hungary) NEKA
12	GK	Boglárka Lukács	5 August 2006 (aged 18)	1.74 m	10	6	(Hungary) Bajnok DSE Nemesvámos
14	RW	Dorka Papp	26 July 2006 (aged 18)	1.65 m	30	3	(Hungary) Ferencvárosi TC
15	LB	Veronika Balogh	7 October 2007 (aged 16)	1.75 m	20	5	(Hungary) Ferencvárosi TC
19	RB	Virág Fazekas	28 August 2007 (aged 16)	1.70 m	20	5	(Hungary) NEKA
23	LW	Fanni Bede	22 January 2007 (aged 17)	1.74 m	12	3	(Hungary) Ferencvárosi TC
26	LB	Noémi Kacsó	8 August 2007 (aged 17)	1.75 m	7	10	(Hungary) Váci NKSE
41	P	Nóra Viktória	19 March 2006 (aged 18)	1.78 m	1	5	(Hungary) Moyra-Budaörs Handball
46	LB	Arina Vári	2 May 2007 (aged 17)	1.73 m	10	3	(Hungary) Győri ETO KC
49	LB	Anna Szeibert	8 April 2007 (aged 17)	1.80 m	40	3	(Hungary) Ferencvárosi TC
57	CB	Renáta Keceli-Mészáros	10 October 2006 (aged 17)	1.67 m	25	4	(Hungary) NEKA
66	CB	Polett Rédecsi	21 February 2006 (aged 18)	1.72 m	30	3	(Hungary) Győri ETO KC
74	P	Liza Seres	4 April 2007 (aged 17)	1.79 m	10	2	(Hungary) NEKA
77	RB	Kíra Kriston	7 May 2007 (aged 17)	1.74 m	12	5	(Hungary) NEKA
78	CB	Liza Pálmai	2 January 2006 (aged 18)	1.69 m	25	5	(Hungary) NEKA
85	GK	Gréta Majoros	28 February 2007 (aged 17)	1.72 m	8	12	(Hungary) PC Trade Szegedi NKE
90	GK	Réka Grebenár	29 September 2007 (aged 16)	1.77 m	25	7	(Hungary) NEKA

=== Kazakhstan ===
The final squad was announced on 13 August 2024.

No.	Pos.	Name	Date of birth (age)	Height	App.	Goals	Club
7	LB	Korkem Orazbayeva	15 February 2008 (aged 16)	1.65 m	0	0	(Kazakhstan) Shymkent
12	GK	Kyzzhibek Galym	23 June 2008 (aged 16)	1.73 m	0	0	(Kazakhstan) Kaysar
15	CB	Zhanerke Ertazayeva	18 April 2007 (aged 17)	1.75 m	20	32	(Kazakhstan) Shymkent
16	GK	Veronika Orlovskaya	31 October 2008 (aged 15)	1.75 m	0	0	(Kazakhstan) Turan
19	P	Makhabbat Koshkarali	22 April 2009 (aged 15)	1.62 m	0	0	(Kazakhstan) Shymkent
20	LW	Karlygash Altynbek	6 October 2006 (aged 17)	1.72 m	0	0	(Kazakhstan) Kaysar
27	LB	Lyubov Kovalyova	15 January 2006 (aged 18)	1.85 m	10	7	(Kazakhstan) Kaysar
28	RB	Banu Kopzhan	4 January 2008 (aged 16)	1.72 m	0	0	(Kazakhstan) Kaysar
29	P	Guldana Maral	9 March 2007 (aged 17)	1.79 m	0	0	(Kazakhstan) Kaysar
35	LW	Darya Stolbovaya	4 March 2006 (aged 18)	1.78 m	15	25	(Kazakhstan) Shymkent
57	LB	Aiym Tursyn	29 August 2007 (aged 16)	1.64 m	7	10	(Kazakhstan) Alatay
72	P	Kristina Paley	24 June 2006 (aged 18)	1.78 m	10	15	(Kazakhstan) Alatay
77	LB	Yana Frankovskaya	27 September 2007 (aged 16)	1.75 m	10	25	(Kazakhstan) Alatay

=== Norway ===
The final squad was announced on 28 June 2024.

Head coach: Ane Mällberg

No.	Pos.	Name	Date of birth (age)	Height	App.	Goals	Club
1	GK	Pernille Rø	27 May 2006 (aged 18)	1.86 m	18	0	(Norway) Byåsen IL
4	P	Maia Hagenes	1 June 2006 (aged 18)	1.71 m	21	36	(Norway) Stavanger IF
5	CB	Mali Halldorsson	26 May 2006 (aged 18)	1.81 m	23	77	(Norway) Kongsvinger IL
6	LW	Milla Haugerstuen Breen	16 July 2006 (aged 18)	1.76 m	4	7	(Norway) Ullern IF
8	LW	Vilde Refsland	26 September 2006 (aged 17)	1.70 m	10	15	(Norway) Stavanger IF
10	RW	Synne With	17 February 2006 (aged 18)	1.67 m	21	65	(Norway) Sola HK
11	CB	Julia Hessen	24 November 2006 (aged 17)	1.60 m	10	15	(Norway) Molde BK
12	GK	Leah Langaard	13 November 2007 (aged 16)	1.84 m	8	0	(Norway) Randesund IL
14	RB	Sofie Nilssen Ekerhovd	7 April 2007 (aged 17)	1.73 m	0	0	(Norway) Sotra SK
16	GK	Ella Gunnarsdottir	22 March 2006 (aged 18)	1.75 m	4	0	(Norway) Stavanger IF
18	P	Ingeborg Nyborg Tømmervåg	1 September 2006 (aged 17)	1.77 m	5	13	(Norway) Molde BK
21	RW	Vanessa Gulbrandsen	21 August 2007 (aged 16)	1.62 m	0	0	(Norway) Nordstrand IF
22	CB	Othilie Liodden Holte	5 November 2006 (aged 17)	1.84 m	18	34	(Norway) Ullern IF
24	RB	Julie Ellingsen	19 September 2006 (aged 17)	1.78 m	7	12	(Norway) Sarpsborg IL
27	CB	Oda Kongssund	30 January 2006 (aged 18)	1.72 m	11	23	(Norway) Gjerpen IF
35	CB	Thilla Molle Langseth	4 January 2007 (aged 17)	1.81 m	0	0	(Norway) Ullern IF

== Group G ==
=== Egypt ===
The final squad was announced on 4 August 2024.

Head coach: Ahmed Mohamed Ghaneim

No.	Pos.	Name	Date of birth (age)	Height	App.	Goals	Club
5	P	Basmala Ahmed	10 January 2006 (aged 18)	1.80 m	6	3	(Egypt) Al Ahly
9	CB	Shrouk Mahmoud	7 July 2006 (aged 18)	1.74 m	31	51	(Egypt) Al Ahly
12	CB	Merna Ashraf	23 March 2008 (aged 16)	1.65 m	0	0	(Egypt) Bakous SC
15	LB	Noha Ehab	5 January 2006 (aged 18)	1.77 m	18	33	(Egypt) Al Ahly
17	LW	Jana Yasser	18 May 2006 (aged 18)	1.70 m	5	7	(Egypt) Zamalek SC
18	LB	Noura Mostafa	1 March 2006 (aged 18)	1.82 m	6	15	(Egypt) Alexandria SC
19	LW	Joudy Oreby	5 April 2006 (aged 18)	1.70 m	6	0	(Egypt) Al Ahly
23	LB	Jana Mahmoud	31 January 2007 (aged 17)	1.76 m	0	0	(Egypt) El Shams SC
68	P	Nada Tamer	17 October 2006 (aged 17)	1.80 m	7	4	(Egypt) 6th of October SC
70	RW	Rokaya Mohamed	18 May 2006 (aged 18)	1.71 m	6	17	(Egypt) Smouha SC
77	LB	Sama Yamen	1 May 2007 (aged 17)	1.78 m	0	0	(Egypt) Smouha SC
88	RW	Sarmada Deabes	7 July 2007 (aged 17)	1.66 m	6	7	(Egypt) Zamalek SC
89	P	Malk Taha	28 March 2006 (aged 18)	1.90 m	8	8	(Egypt) 6th of October SC
90	LB	Shahd Safeyelden	13 September 2006 (aged 17)	1.90 m	8	20	(Egypt) Bakous SC
92	GK	Ganna Noureldin	6 December 2006 (aged 17)	1.80 m	6	0	(Egypt) Bakous SC
98	GK	Gihad Wael	21 February 2006 (aged 18)	1.78 m	28	0	(Egypt) Al Ahly
99	CB	Judy Waled	28 July 2007 (aged 17)	1.67 m	6	23	(Egypt) Zamalek SC

=== Romania ===
The final squad was announced on 30 July 2024.

Head coach: Carmen Cuibar

No.	Pos.	Name	Date of birth (age)	Height	App.	Goals	Club
1	GK	Ana Totoescu	22 February 2007 (aged 17)	1.79 m	22	2	(Romania) CSM Corona Brașov
2	LW	Alexia Niță	21 March 2007 (aged 17)	1.65 m	40	130	(Romania) HC Zalău
4	CB	Evelin Marton	23 February 2006 (aged 18)	1.72 m	10	25	(Romania) ACS Sepsi Sic Sfantu Gheorghe
5	CB	Alexandra Voicu	1 April 2006 (aged 18)	1.65 m	35	80	(Romania) CSM București
7	CB	Maria Balint	17 March 2006 (aged 18)	1.75 m	20	25	(Romania) ACS Sepsi Sic Sfantu Gheorghe
9	P	Alexia Oprea	28 July 2006 (aged 18)	1.70 m	20	30	(Romania) SCM Râmnicu Vâlcea
10	RW	Gabriela Tulea	8 November 2006 (aged 17)	1.76 m	30	75	(Romania) CS Universitatea Știința București
11	RB	Martina Stan	28 May 2007 (aged 17)	1.81 m	25	50	(Romania) ACS Sepsi Sic Sfantu Gheorghe
12	GK	Ioana Niță	4 May 2006 (aged 18)	1.85 m	45	3	(Romania) HC Zalău
13	LB	Mioara Ciubotaru	14 April 2006 (aged 18)	1.82 m	35	80	(Romania) CSM București
15	LW	Daria Lupiscă	12 March 2006 (aged 18)	1.62 m	0	0	(Romania) ACS Sepsi Sic Sfantu Gheorghe
16	GK	Anastasia Roșu	10 February 2006 (aged 18)	1.78 m	0	0	(Romania) CS Rapid București
17	LB	Anamaria Șerban	19 March 2007 (aged 17)	1.78 m	40	150	(Romania) CSM Corona Brașov
18	CB	Bianca Vintilā	8 February 2006 (aged 18)	1.76 m	0	0	(Romania) HC Zalău
21	RW	Sara Istrate	23 October 2008 (aged 15)	1.71 m	0	0	(Romania) CSM București
24	CB	Maria Soroceanu	24 January 2006 (aged 18)	1.69 m	40	120	(Romania) CS Rapid București
27	P	Antonia Mosor	3 November 2007 (aged 16)	1.78 m	0	0	(Romania) CSM Corona Brașov
84	LB	Enrika Bodijar	14 February 2006 (aged 18)	1.76 m	40	125	(Romania) CS Rapid București

=== Spain ===
The final squad was announced on 11 July 2024.

Head coach: Cristina Cabeza

No.	Pos.	Name	Date of birth (age)	Height	App.	Goals	Club
1	GK	Goundo Gassama	23 March 2006 (aged 18)	1.74 m	27	2	(Spain) BM Granollers
2	LB	Anna Ros Quesada	26 August 2006 (aged 17)	1.81 m	6	8	(Spain) Handbol Sant Quirze
3	P	Kelly Fonkeng	1 September 2006 (aged 17)	1.86 m	29	43	(Spain) CD Beti Onak
4	P	Libe Arruabarrena	10 October 2006 (aged 17)	1.73 m	28	37	(Spain) CD Beti Onak
5	RB	Estitxu Rodríguez	2 January 2006 (aged 18)	1.73 m	27	92	(Spain) CD Beti Onak
6	CB	Marta Regordán	7 November 2006 (aged 17)	1.63 m	24	57	(Spain) CBF Málaga Costa del Sol
7	LB	Belén Rodríguez	2 August 2006 (aged 18)	1.73 m	29	63	(Spain) BM Granollers
8	P	Kadidiatou Jallow	12 August 2006 (aged 18)	1.70 m	8	8	(Spain) BM Granollers
9	RW	Nayra Solís	16 February 2006 (aged 18)	1.72 m	22	49	(Spain) CBF Málaga Costa del Sol
10	LB	Nerea Patiño	9 January 2006 (aged 18)	1.74 m	32	76	(Spain) CD BM Aula
11	LW	Elena Torres	23 March 2006 (aged 18)	1.75 m	32	46	(Spain) CDE Escolapios Montequinto
12	GK	Udane Bernabé	3 May 2006 (aged 18)	1.71 m	26	0	(Spain) CB Elche
15	LW	Celia García Sánchez	20 January 2007 (aged 17)	1.75 m	32	84	(Spain) BM Ciudad Real
16	GK	Andrea Sáez	24 July 2006 (aged 18)	1.85 m	3	0	(Spain) BM Bera Bera
17	CB	Naroa Baquedano	27 August 2006 (aged 17)	1.78 m	18	64	(Spain) SCDR Anaitasuna
18	RB	Judit González	1 June 2006 (aged 18)	1.76 m	21	39	(Spain) Handbol Sant Vicenç
19	RW	Sara Palanqués	22 April 2006 (aged 18)	1.66 m	13	24	(Spain) BM Morvedre

=== Switzerland ===
The final squad was announced on 11 August 2024.

Head coach: Jürgen Fleischmann

No.	Pos.	Name	Date of birth (age)	Height	App.	Goals	Club
1	GK	Jael Billeter	24 April 2008 (aged 16)	1.73 m	0	0	(Switzerland) HV Herzogenbuchsee
2	CB	Lisa Herger	18 April 2008 (aged 16)	1.74 m	0	0	(Switzerland) Spono Eagles
5	LW	Giuliana Manduca	4 July 2007 (aged 17)	1.65 m	17	17	(Switzerland) Spono Eagles
7	LB	Lenka Simova	30 March 2006 (aged 18)	1.81 m	15	22	(Switzerland) LC Brühl
10	P	Joelle Oberholzer	9 March 2006 (aged 18)	1.80 m	16	5	(Switzerland) LK Zug
11	CB	Noëlle Osterwalder	11 March 2008 (aged 16)	1.68 m	17	41	(Switzerland) LK Zug
12	GK	Zoé Osterwalder	29 December 2006 (aged 17)	1.75 m	17	0	(Switzerland) LK Zug
13	LW	Era Baumann	10 April 2007 (aged 17)	1.67 m	28	109	(Switzerland) GC Amicitia Zürich
14	RB	Yara-Ladina Brunett	22 June 2007 (aged 17)	1.74 m	11	31	(Switzerland) LK Zug
16	GK	Seraina Kuratli	18 April 2007 (aged 17)	1.76 m	28	3	(Switzerland) GC Amicitia Zürich
18	RW	Anouk Grüring	30 January 2007 (aged 17)	1.65 m	17	49	(Switzerland) Club 72 Köniz
19	LB	Aurora Bitzi	5 July 2005 (aged 19)	1.70 m	3	13	(Switzerland) LC Brühl
20	CB	Melina Käser	21 May 2006 (aged 18)	1.70 m	11	0	(Switzerland) Spono Eagles
38	RB	Nora Emmenegger	10 January 2008 (aged 16)	1.70 m	16	30	(Switzerland) Spono Eagles
43	LB	Jessica Acklin	10 February 2008 (aged 16)	1.75 m	14	8	(Switzerland) TV Pratteln
44	P	Joline Erni	18 April 2006 (aged 18)	1.75 m	19	25	(Switzerland) GC Amicitia Zürich

== Group H ==
=== Czech Republic ===
The final squad was announced on 8 August 2024.

Head coach: Petra Vítková

No.	Pos.	Name	Date of birth (age)	Height	App.	Goals	Club
1	GK	Nikola Fadrná	27 August 2006 (aged 17)	1.73 m	0	0	(Czech Republic) DHK Zora Olomouc
2	RW	Zuzana Malcová	25 September 2006 (aged 17)	1.66 m	0	0	(Czech Republic) TJ Sokol Písek
3	RW	Tereza Pazderová	10 May 2006 (aged 18)	1.65 m	0	0	(Czech Republic) DHK Baník Most
4	CB	Anna Kocová	27 December 2006 (aged 17)	1.75 m	0	0	(Czech Republic) TJ Sokol Písek
5	LW	Claudia Rampová	1 June 2006 (aged 18)	1.72 m	0	0	(Czech Republic) Házená Kynžvart
7	P	Eliška Škárková	3 February 2007 (aged 17)	1.76 m	0	0	(Czech Republic) DHC Sokol Poruba
9	RB	Natálie Baborovská	14 March 2007 (aged 17)	1.64 m	0	0	(Czech Republic) TJ Háje Jižní Město HC
10	RB	Regína Matějková	5 January 2006 (aged 18)	1.66 m	0	0	(Czech Republic) DHC Slavia Prague
11	LB	Melisa Holeňáková	17 February 2006 (aged 18)	1.69 m	0	0	(Czech Republic) DHC Slavia Prague
12	GK	Adéla Chvátalová	19 April 2007 (aged 17)	1.80 m	0	0	(Czech Republic) DHC Plzeň
13	P	Viktorie Pejšová	28 September 2007 (aged 16)	1.86 m	0	0	(Czech Republic) DHC Slavia Prague
15	LW	Eliška Baroňová	15 May 2006 (aged 18)	1.65 m	0	0	(Czech Republic) DHC Slavia Prague
17	LB	Viktorie Vrbková	29 January 2006 (aged 18)	1.75 m	0	0	(Czech Republic) TJ Sokol Kobylisy II.
19	LB	Tereza Pospíšilová	26 April 2006 (aged 18)	1.81 m	0	0	(Czech Republic) HC Zlín
21	RB	Markéta Polanková	29 October 2006 (aged 17)	1.76 m	0	0	(Czech Republic) DHC Plzeň
22	CB	Tereza Filípková	10 March 2006 (aged 18)	1.65 m	0	0	(Czech Republic) HC Zlín

=== Germany ===
The final squad was announced on 5 August 2024.

Head coach: Gino Smits

No.	Pos.	Name	Date of birth (age)	Height	App.	Goals	Club
1	GK	Lina Steinecke	17 February 2007 (aged 17)	1.70 m	19	1	(Germany) TV Hannover-Badenstedt
3	RW	Jana Walther	19 February 2007 (aged 17)	1.75 m	5	9	(Germany) HC Leipzig
4	RW	Leila Ott	24 January 2007 (aged 17)	1.72 m	11	29	(Germany) HSG Bensheim/Auerbach
6	LW	Alissa Werle	23 May 2006 (aged 18)	1.77 m	25	43	(Germany) Füchse Berlin
7	LW	Chiara Rohr	6 June 2007 (aged 17)	1.77 m	2	3	(Germany) TV Hannover-Badenstedt
9	CB	Lotta Christiansen	5 July 2006 (aged 18)	1.68 m	6	10	(Germany) Handewitter SV
10	CB	Frida Heimann	30 October 2006 (aged 17)	1.72 m	19	20	(Germany) Borussia Dortmund
11	RB	Dajana Schnabel	5 June 2006 (aged 18)	1.70 m	4	4	(Germany) Frankfurter HC
13	P	Aylin Bornhardt	17 November 2006 (aged 17)	1.73 m	20	49	(Germany) SV Salamander Kornwestheim
14	RB	Marleen Kern	14 January 2006 (aged 18)	1.75 m	27	50	(Germany) SG Kappelwindeck/Steinbach
15	CB	Lena Berens	26 January 2006 (aged 18)	1.82 m	20	20	(Germany) Berliner TSC
16	GK	Lena Lindemann	7 January 2006 (aged 18)	1.80 m	18	0	(Germany) TSV Bayer 04 Leverkusen
18	P	Laura Klocke	23 March 2006 (aged 18)	1.80 m	19	20	(Germany) HC Leipzig
19	LB	Lin Lück	23 March 2006 (aged 18)	1.84 m	3	3	(Germany) Buxtehuder SV
20	LB	Marlene Tucholke	9 October 2007 (aged 16)	1.91 m	16	87	(Germany) HC Leipzig
21	LB	Kim Ott	17 February 2006 (aged 18)	1.85 m	17	38	(Germany) Thüringer HC

=== Guinea ===
The final squad was announced on 10 August 2024.

Head coach: Jean-Louis Leblond

No.	Pos.	Name	Date of birth (age)	Height	App.	Goals	Club
1	GK	Fatoumata Soumah	11 November 2006 (aged 17)	1.70 m	9	0	(Guinea) Union Sportive de Guinée
2	LW	Mabinty Camara	12 July 2008 (aged 16)	1.62 m	0	0	(Guinea) Espoir Olympique
3	P	N'nady Sylla	15 November 2008 (aged 15)	1.79 m	0	0	(Guinea) Kamsar
4	CB	Hawa Sylla	12 December 2007 (aged 16)	1.51 m	1	55	(Guinea) Kamsar
5	RW	Aissatou Diallo	14 February 2008 (aged 16)	1.59 m	12	32	(Guinea) Fria
6	P	Mariame Diallo	2 April 2008 (aged 16)	1.65 m	0	0	(Guinea) Horoya
7	RW	N'nankony Touré	10 November 2008 (aged 15)	1.75 m	0	0	(Guinea) Kamsar
8	P	Aminata Kaba	12 June 2008 (aged 16)	1.79 m	7	1	(Guinea) Stade de Guinée
9	LB	Bountouraby Camara	21 March 2008 (aged 16)	1.75 m	0	0	(Guinea) Espoir Olympique
10	CB	Fatoumata Sylla	2 June 2006 (aged 18)	1.67 m	0	0	(Guinea) Aiglon de Guinée
11	CB	Fatou Keïta	18 November 2008 (aged 15)	1.65 m	0	0	(Guinea) Tout Puissant de Guinée
12	CB	Makhissa Soumah	12 May 2008 (aged 16)	1.69 m	0	0	(Guinea) Horoya
13	LB	N'nabintou Sidibé	3 March 2008 (aged 16)	1.65 m	0	0	(Guinea) Espoir Olympique
14	CB	Mama Camara	22 October 2006 (aged 17)	1.56 m	0	0	(Guinea) Espoir Olympique
15	LB	Mariama Diallo	24 December 2008 (aged 15)	1.67 m	0	0	(Guinea) Kamsar
16	GK	M'mahawa Conté	19 December 2006 (aged 17)	1.61 m	7	0	(Guinea) Alu Star de Fria
17	CB	Kadiatou Koumbassa	24 November 2007 (aged 16)	1.60 m	0	0	(Guinea) Athletico
22	GK	Aïcha Richard	15 December 2008 (aged 15)	1.65 m	0	0	(Guinea) Union Sportive de Guinée

=== Iceland ===
The final squad was announced on 11 August 2024.

Head coach: Rakel Dögg Bragadóttir

No.	Pos.	Name	Date of birth (age)	Height	App.	Goals	Club
1	GK	Ingunn María Brynjarsdóttir	1 June 2006 (aged 18)	1.70 m	13	0	(Iceland) Fram
2	RW	Gyða Kristín Ásgeirsdóttir	29 December 2006 (aged 17)	1.62 m	3	0	(Iceland) FH
4	LW	Ásthildur Jóna Þórhallsdóttir	18 September 2006 (aged 17)	1.62 m	0	0	(Iceland) Valur
6	RB	Dagmar Guðrún Pálsdóttir	14 May 2006 (aged 18)	1.63 m	13	61	(Iceland) Fram
8	LB	Kristbjörg Erlingsdóttir	3 July 2006 (aged 18)	1.77 m	11	20	(Iceland) Valur
11	LB	Guðrún Hekla Traustadóttir	11 November 2007 (aged 16)	1.78 m	13	13	(Iceland) Valur
12	GK	Ingibjörg Hauksdóttir	12 January 2007 (aged 17)	1.70 m	0	0	(Norway) Flint Tønsberg
13	P	Guðmunda Auður Guðjónsdóttir	5 July 2007 (aged 17)	1.74 m	5	6	(Iceland) Stjarnan
15	RW	Alexandra Ósk Viktorsdóttir	26 November 2007 (aged 16)	1.78 m	13	5	(Iceland) ÍBV
16	GK	Elísabet Millý Elíasardóttir	11 May 2006 (aged 18)	1.84 m	9	0	(Iceland) Stjarnan
17	CB	Lydía Gunnþórsdóttir	30 September 2006 (aged 17)	1.72 m	13	55	(Iceland) KA/Þór
18	LW	Þóra Hrafnkelsdóttir	12 October 2006 (aged 17)	1.58 m	11	15	(Iceland) Haukar
19	P	Ágústa Rún Jónasdóttir	12 July 2006 (aged 18)	1.78 m	13	16	(Iceland) Valur
20	CB	Bergrós Ásta Guðmundsdóttir	5 June 2007 (aged 17)	1.66 m	0	0	(Iceland) KA/Þór
21	LB	Ásrún Inga Arnarsdóttir	12 June 2006 (aged 18)	1.81 m	11	7	(Iceland) Valur
22	CB	Arna Karitas Eiríksdóttir	29 March 2007 (aged 17)	1.65 m	11	11	(Iceland) Valur
