= Guðrún Ósk Maríasdóttir =

Icelandic handball player (born 1989)

Personal information
- Nationality: Icelandic
- Born: 12 March 1989 (age 37)

Sport
- Sport: Handball
- Position: Goalkeeper

Senior clubs
- Years: Team
- 2007-2008: Grótta
- 2008-2011: Fylkir
- 2011-2013: Fram
- 2013-2015: FH
- 2015-2018: Fram
- 2018-2019: Stjarnan
National team
| Years | Team | Apps | (Gls) |
| – | Iceland | 34 | (1) |
- Updated on 30 July 2019

Guðrún Ósk Maríasdóttir (born 12 March 1989) is an Icelandic team handball player who plays the goalkeeper position.

== Career ==
In 2011, Guðrún Ósk signed with Fram after a standout season with Fylkir. She missed the majority of the 2012–2013 season due to pregnancy.

In August 2013, she signed with FH.

She returned to Fram in 2015 and won the Icelandic championship with the club in 2017 and 2018, and was named the Playoff MVP in 2017.

In May 2018, she signed a 2-year contract with fellow Úrvalsdeild club Stjarnan. In end of September that same year, she suffered a concussion in Stjarnan's second game of the season and ended missing the rest of the season. In May 2019, Stjarnan terminated its contract with Guðrún Ósk. Due to the severity of the injury, she was unable to work and had to receive disability pension.

== National team career ==
Guðrún has played 34 games for the Icelandic national team.

== Awards, titles and accomplishments ==
=== Titles ===
- Icelandic champion: 2013, 2017, 2018
- Icelandic Cup: 2018

=== Titles ===
- Úrvalsdeild Playoff MVP: 2017
- Úrvalsdeild Best Goalkeeper: 2017, 2018

== Personal life ==
Guðrún Ósk is married to Icelandic CrossFit athlete Árni Björn Kristjánsson.
