= Hrafnhildur Hanna Þrastardóttir =

Icelandic handballer (born 1995)

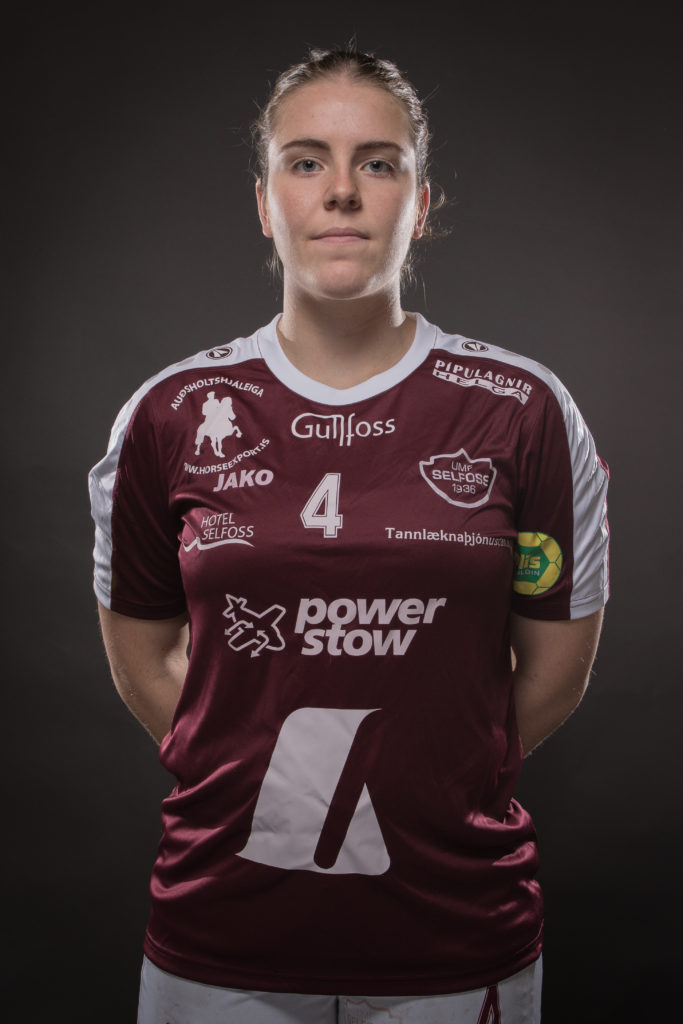

Personal information
- Nationality: Icelandic
- Born: 14 May 1995 (age 31) Selfoss, Iceland
- Height: 1.72 m (5 ft 8 in)

Sport
- Sport: Handball
- Position: Central back
- Current club: Selfoss
- Number: 4

Senior clubs
- Years: Team
- 2011–2019: Selfoss
- 2019–2020: Bourg-de-Péage
- 2020–: ÍBV
National team
Years	Team	Apps	(Gls)
2014–	Iceland	41	(78)
- Updated on 23 January 2024

Hrafnhildur Hanna Þrastardóttir (born 14 May 1995) is an Icelandic handballer who plays for Icelandic top division side ÍBV and the Icelandic national team as a central back.

== Career ==
=== Club career ===
In 2015, Hrafnhildur was the top goal scorer in the Úrvalsdeild kvenna 159 goals. She again led the league in scoring in 2016 and 2017.

=== National team career ===
Hrafnhildur was first selected to the Icelandic national team in 2014. In March 2017, Hrafnhildur tore her left ACL in a game against Netherlands.

== Achievements ==
- Úrvalsdeild kvenna top goal scorer: 2015, 2016, 2017

== Club statistics ==
Season	League	Team	G	Goals	Y	2M	R
2012–13	Úrvalsdeild kvenna	Selfoss	16	96	1	2	0
2013–14	Úrvalsdeild kvenna	Selfoss	20	110	5	5	0
2014–15	Úrvalsdeild kvenna	Selfoss	22	159	3	7	0
2015–16	Úrvalsdeild kvenna	Selfoss	26	247	9	7	0
2016–17	Úrvalsdeild kvenna	Selfoss	18	174	6	2	0
2017–18	Úrvalsdeild kvenna	Selfoss	12	34	1	0	0
2018–19	Úrvalsdeild kvenna	Selfoss	14	101	2	2	0
Career total			117	921	27	25	0
