= Íris Björk Símonardóttir =

Icelandic handball player (born 1987)

Personal information
- Nationality: Icelandic
- Born: 26 June 1987 (age 39) Iceland
- Height: 1.74 m (5 ft 9 in)

Sport
- Sport: Handball
- Position: Goalkeeper

Senior clubs
- Years: Team
- 2003–2009: Íþróttafélagið Grótta
- 2009-2012: Fram
- 2012–2018: Íþróttafélagið Grótta
- 2018-2019: Valur
National team
Years	Team	Apps	(Gls)
2005–201?	Iceland	71	(4)
- Updated on 17 April 2020

Íris Björk Símonardóttir (born 26 June 1987) is an Icelandic former handballer who played 71 games for the Iceland national team. She won the Icelandic championship three times and the Icelandic Handball Cup seven times during her career. She was named the Icelandic Women's Handball Player of the Year in 2015 and 2019.

== Awards, titles and accomplishments ==
=== Titles ===
- Icelandic champion: 2015, 2016, 2019
- Icelandic Handball Cup: 2010, 2011, 2012, 2013, 2014, 2015, 2019

=== Individual awards ===
- Icelandic Women's Handball Player of the Year: 2015, 2019
- Úrvalsdeild kvenna Player of the Year: 2019
- Úrvalsdeild kvenna Goalkeeper of the Year (5): 2011, 2014, 2015, 2016, 2019
