= Hildur Þorgeirsdóttir =

Icelandic handball player (born 1989)

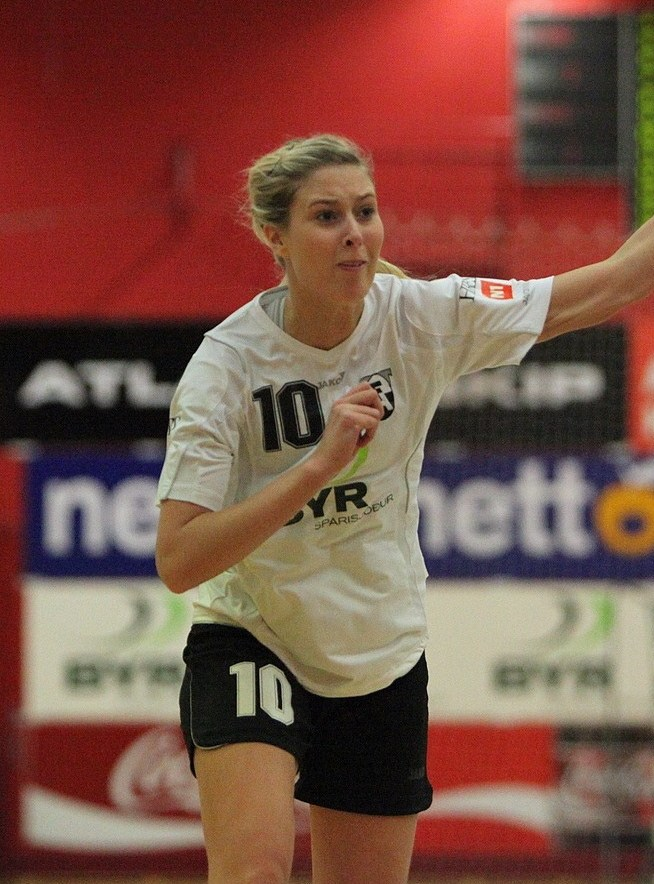
- Hildur playing for Iceland national team

Personal information
- Nationality: Icelandic
- Born: 11 March 1989 (age 37) Reykjavík, Iceland
- Height: 1.78 m (5 ft 10 in)

Sport
- Sport: Handball
- Position: Right back
- Current club: Retired

Senior clubs
- Years: Team
- 2004-2009: FH
- 2009-2011: Fram
- 2011-2013: HSG Blomberg-Lippe
- 2013-2015: TuS Weibern
- 2015-2022: Fram
- 2023: FH
National team
| Years | Team | Apps | (Gls) |
| 2010-2021 | Iceland | 52 | (34) |

Teams managed
- 2023-: Iceland youth
- Updated on 26 February 2018

Hildur Þorgeirsdóttir (born 11 March 1989) is an Icelandic handball coach and former player. She played Fram in Iceland and HSG Blomberg-Lippe and TuS Weibern in Germany. She also played for the Icelandic national team.

== Career ==
Þorgeirsdóttir began playing handball at FH Hafnarfjörður. In the 2008–09 season she scored 96 goals, which prompted a move to the top club Fram Reykjavík. In her first period at the club she won the Icelandic cup in 2010 and 2011.

In 2011 she signed a two-year deal with the German Bundesliga team HSG Blomberg-Lippe. In the two years she played at the club she scored 77 goals. In 2013 she joined league rivals TuS Weibern. Here she scored 118 goals in two years.

After playing four seasons in Germany Hildur Þorgeirsdóttir signed with Fram in May 2015. She won the Icelandic championship with Fram in 2017, 2018 and 2022 and the Icelandic cup in 2018 and 2020. She retired after the 2021–2022 season.

In 2012 she was part of the Icelandic team that qualified for the European Women's Handball Championship for the first team in history.

== Trophies ==
- Icelandic Champion:
  - 2017, 2018, 2022
- Icelandic Cup:
  - 2010, 2011, 2018, 2020
- League champion:
  - 2019, 2020, 2022
- Icelandic League Cup:
  - 2010, 2015, 2016, 2017
