= 1. deild kvenna (handball) =

Women's handball competition in Iceland

- Founded: 1952
- No. of teams: 10
- Country: Iceland
- Confederation: EHF
- Most recent champion: KA/Þór (1st title) (2017-2018)
- Most titles: Haukar (4 titles)
- Level on pyramid: 2
- Promotion to: Úrvalsdeild kvenna
- Website: hsi.is
- 2018-2019

1. deild kvenna (English: Women's 1st Division), also known as Grill 66 deild kvenna for sponsorship reasons, is the second-tier women's handball competition among clubs in Iceland. It is managed by the Icelandic Handball Association. The current champions are KA/Þór who won their first title in 2018.

== Past champions ==
	Club	Titles
1.	Haukar	4
2.	FH	3
	Fram	3
	Stjarnan	3
5.	Breiðablik	2
	ÍA	2
	ÍBV	2
	Þór Akureyri	2
9.	Fjölnir	1
	Grótta	1
	ÍR	1
	KA/Þór	1
	Keflavík ÍF	1
	KR	1
	Selfoss	1
	UMFG	1
	Valur	1
	Víkingur	1

== Awards ==
=== Player of the Year ===
- 2017 - Martha Hermannsdóttir
- 2018 - Martha Hermannsdóttir

=== Young player of the Year ===
- 2017 - Andrea Jacobsen
- 2018 - Þóra María Sigurjónsdóttir

=== Coach of the Year ===
- 2017 - Jónatan Þór Magnússon
- 2018 - Jónatan Þór Magnússon
