= Ramunė Pekarskytė =

Lithuanian-Icelandic handball player (born 1980)

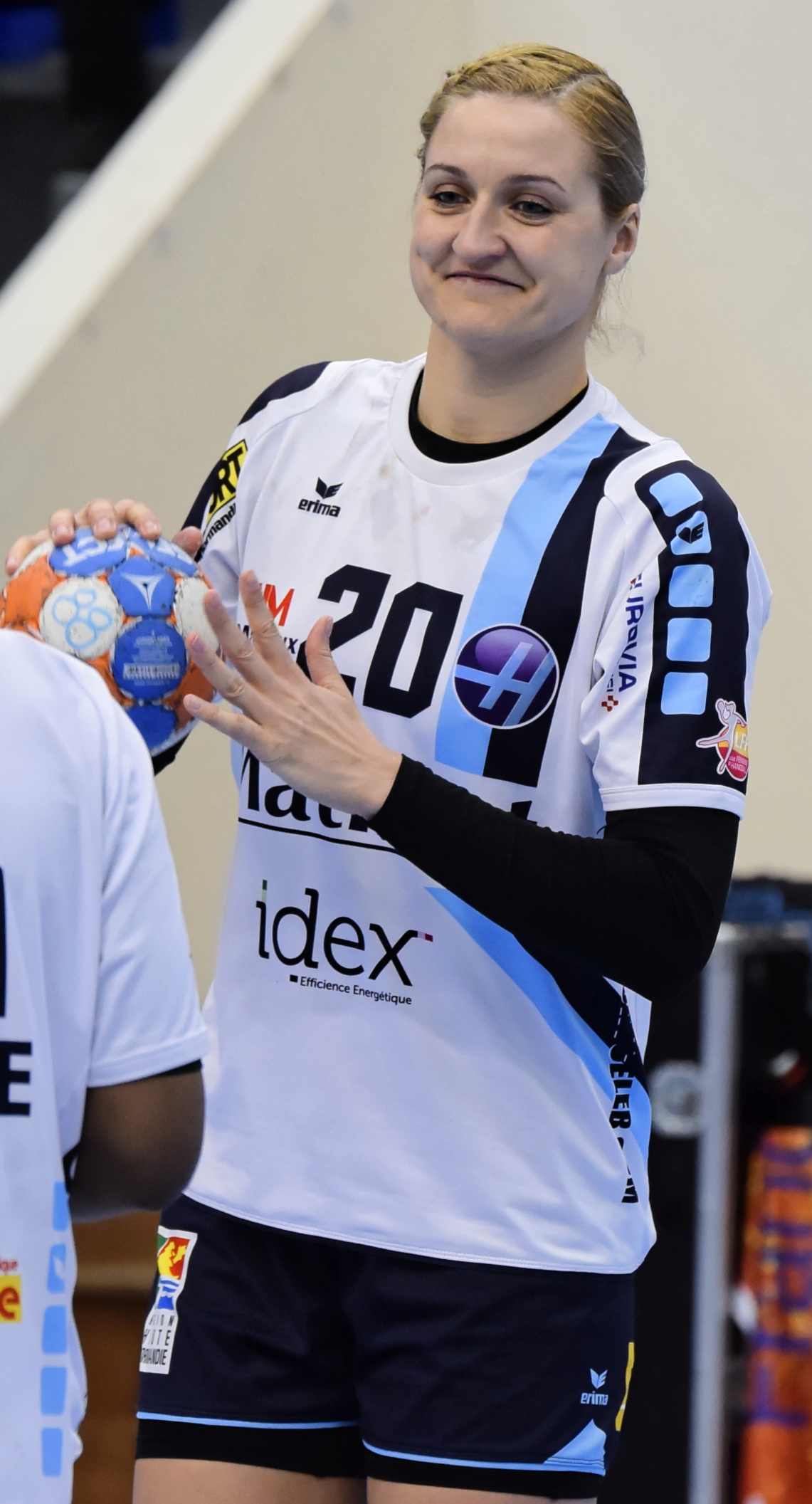

Personal information
- Nationality: Lithuanian / Icelandic
- Born: 5 October 1980 (age 46) Pasvalys, Lithuania
- Height: 1.85 m (6 ft 1 in)

Sport
- Sport: Handball
- Position: Left back
- Current club: Haukar
- Number: 13

Senior clubs
- Years: Team
- 2003-2010: Haukar
- 2010-2013: Levanger Handball
- 2013-2014: SønderjyskE
- 2014-2015: Le Havre AC
- 2015-2017: Haukar
- 2017-2018: Stjarnan
- 2018-2019: Haukar
National team
Years	Team		
1996-2009	Lithuania		
2012-2017	Iceland	38	(103)
- Updated on 25 January 2024

Ramunė Pekarskytė (born 5 October 1980) is a Lithuanian-Icelandic former handball player for Haukar of Úrvalsdeild kvenna, and the Icelandic national team. Although born in Lithuania, she gained Icelandic citizenship on 14 June 2012 and has been available for the Icelandic team since then.

== Career ==
Pekarskytė played for Haukar from 2003 to 2010 when she joined Levanger Handball. In April 2013, she signed with SönderjyskE in Denmark. In 2014, Pekarskytė signed with Le Havre AC of the French championship league. In 2015 she signed back with Haukar in the Icelandic Úrvalsdeild kvenna, where she played until 2017 when she signed with Stjarnan. For the 2017–18 season, she led Stjarnan with 109 goals 19 games.

In August 2018, Pekarskytė signed back with Haukar.
