= Lovísa Thompson =

Icelandic handball player (born 1999)

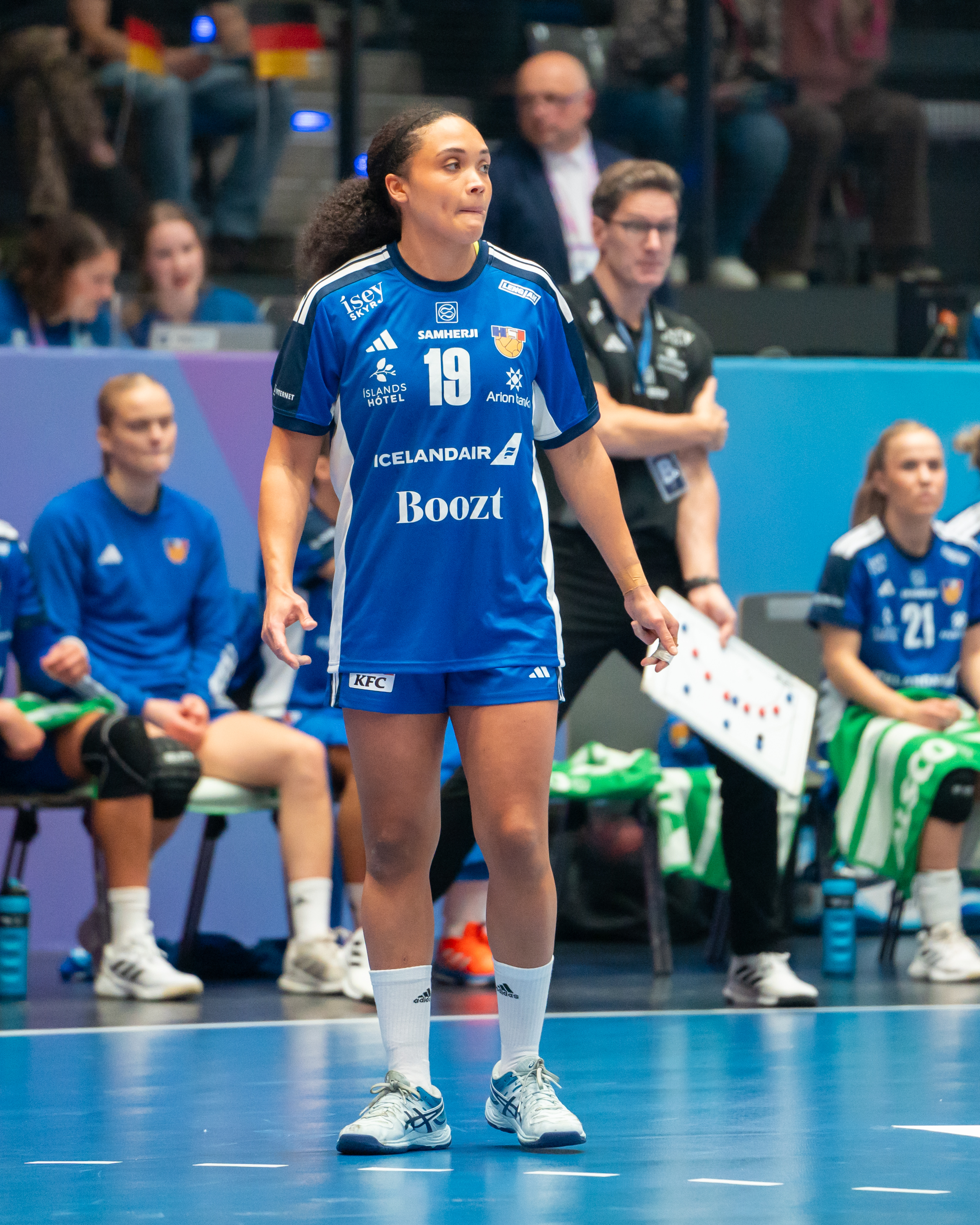

Personal information
- Nationality: Icelandic
- Born: 27 October 1999 (age 27) Reykjavík, Iceland
- Height: 1.72 m (5 ft 8 in)

Sport
- Sport: Handball
- Position: Left back
- Current club: Valur

Senior clubs
- Years: Team
- 2014–2018: Íþróttafélagið Grótta
- 2018–: Valur
- 2022: → Ringkøbing
National team
Years	Team	Apps	(Gls)
2017–	Iceland	29	(69)
- Updated on 30 May 2022

Lovísa Thompson (born 27 October 1999) is an Icelandic handball player who plays for Valur and played for Grótta, and the Icelandic national team. She has won both the Icelandic championship and Icelandic Cup three times each.

In September 2018, she was included by EHF in a list of the twenty best young handballers to watch for the future.

== Playing career ==
She started her career with Íþróttafélagið Grótta during the 2013–2014, appearing in her first game on 1 February 2014. She helped Grótta win the national championship in 2015, scoring the game-winning goal with 3 seconds left in the deciding game of the Úrvalsdeild Finals.

After Grótta vas relegated to 1. deild kvenna in 2018, Lovísa signed with Úrvalsdeild club Valur. In 2019, she won the Icelandic Cup with Valur where she was also named the Cup Finals MVP.

In May 2022, Lovísa was loaned to Ringkøbing Håndbold of the Damehåndboldligaen. She left the club in October 2022.

In December 2022, Lovísa was loaned to Tertnes HE as an attempt to help the club avoid relegation from the highest ranked league in Norway, REMA 1000-ligaen. Due to an injury, she didn't appear in any games for Tertnes and returned to Iceland. In February, it was reported that she was scheduled for a surgery to fix a bone chip that was pushing on her achilles tendon.

== Titles, awards and achievements ==
=== Titles ===
- Icelandic champion (4):
  - 2015, 2016, 2019, 2023
- Icelandic Cup (2):
  - 2015, 2019

=== Awards ===
- Icelandic Cup Finals MVP:
  - 2019
