= 1. deild kvenna =

1. deild kvenna is a name given to women's competitions in Iceland and may refer to:

- 1. deild kvenna (basketball), the second-tier women's basketball league in Iceland
- 1. deild kvenna (football), the second-tier women's football league in Iceland
- 1. deild kvenna (handball), the second-tier women's handball league in Iceland
