= Ágúst Þór Jóhannsson =

Icelandic handball player, coach (born 1977)

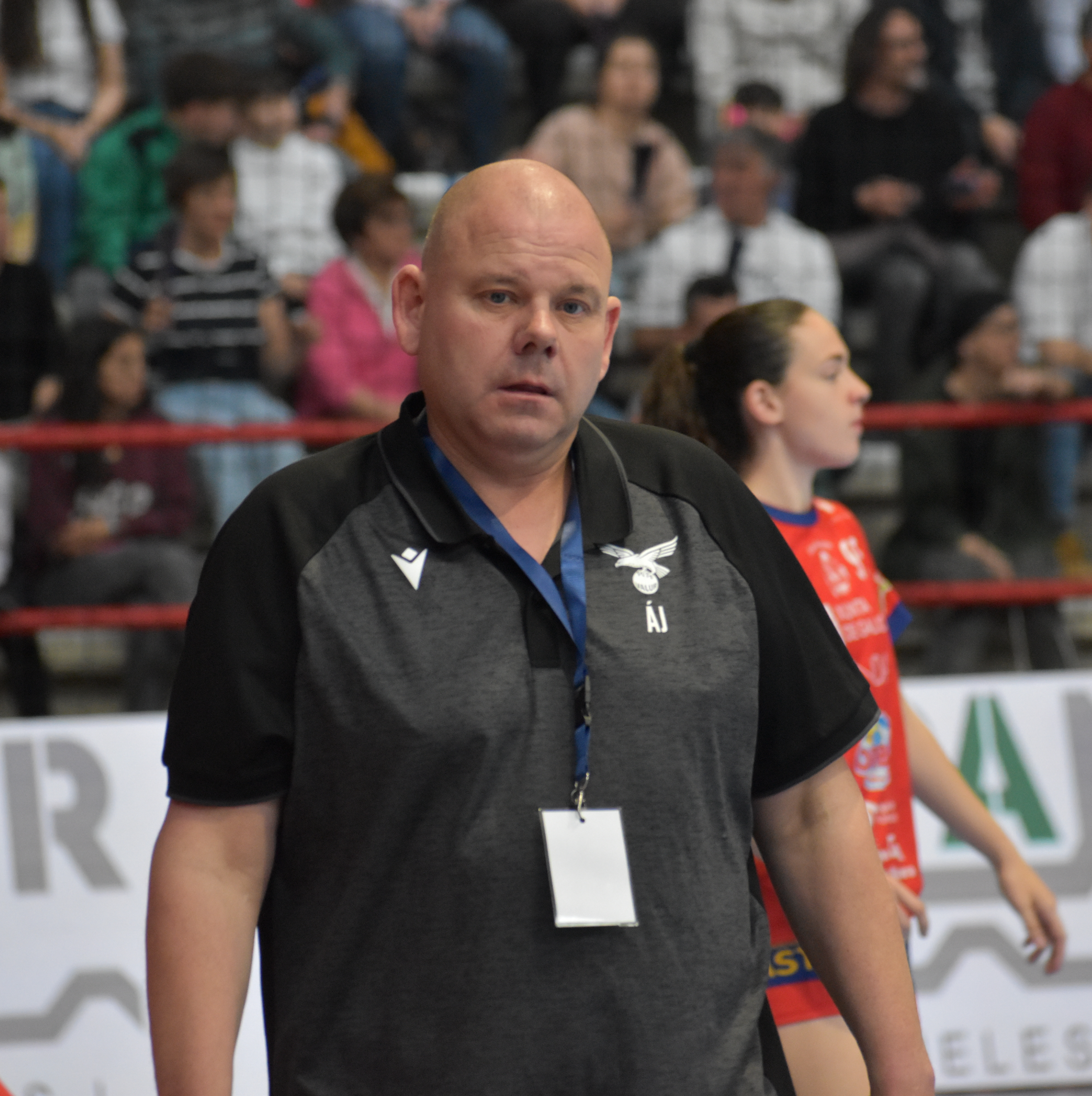

Personal information
- Full name: Ágúst Þór Jóhannsson
- Nationality: Icelandic
- Born: 19 February 1977 (age 49) Iceland

Sport
- Sport: Handball
- Position: Head coach
- Current club: Valur (men's handball)

Teams managed
- Years: Team
- 1998: Grótta/KR (W)
- 1998–1999: Grótta/KR (M, assistant)
- 1999–2000: Valur (W)
- 2000–2001: Iceland (W)
- 2001–2002: Valur (W, assistant)
- 2001–2002: Valur (M, assistant)
- 2002–2005: Grótta/KR (M)
- 2005–2008: Valur (W)
- 2008–2009: Grótta (M)
- 2009–2012: Levanger (W)
- 2011–2016: Iceland (W)
- 2013–2014: SønderjyskE (W)
- 2014: HK (M)
- 2014–2016: Víkingur (M)
- 2016–2017: KR (M)
- 2018–2021: Faroe Islands (W)
- 2017–2025: Valur (W)
- 2020–2025: Iceland (W, assistant)
- 2025-: Valur (men's handball)

Ágúst Þór Jóhannsson (born 19 February 1977) is an Icelandic team handball coach and a former player for Knattspyrnufélag Reykjavíkur.

== Coaching career ==
=== Club career ===
In 1998, Ágúst took over as head coach of the joint Grótta/KR women's team for the rest of the 1997–1998 season after Andrés Gunnlaugsson was fired. After serving as an assistant coach to the Grótta/KR men's team for the 1998–1999 season, he was hired as the head coach of Valur women's team in May 1999. Under his watch the team won the Icelandic Women's Handball Cup but was knocked out in the Final 8 in the national championship playoffs after losing to Fimmleikafélag Hafnarfjarðar. He resigned from hist post after the season to take over as the head coach of the Iceland women's national handball team. He returned to Valur in 2001 after one year with the national team to serve as an assistant coach to both the men's and women's teams.

In February 2002, Ágúst was hired as the head coach of the joint Grótta/KR men's team. He resigned at the end of the 2004–2005 season.

He returned once again to Valur in April 2005 when he signed a three-year contract to coach the women's team. He guided the team to the 2008 national championship finals where it lost to Stjarnan.

In 2008, Ágúst signed a three-year contract to coach the Grótta men's team. He left the team after the season, after guiding the club to victory in the 1. deild karla and promotion to Úrvalsdeild karla, and signed with Levanger Håndballklubb of the Norwegian Eliteserien. On 2 March 2012, Ágúst was fired from Levanger with three games left of the season and the team in 10th place.

Ágúst was hired as the head coach of SønderjyskE Håndbold women's team in February 2013. He resigned in February 2014 after the team had only won 2 of its 18 games. Shortly later he was hired as an interim coach for HK men's team to finish out the season, replacing Samúel Ívar Árnason. After the season he took over the reins of Víkingur men's team.

He guided Víkingur to promotion to the Úrvalsdeild karla in his first season at the club. After a difficult 2015–2016 season, where the team was relegated back to 1. deild karla, Ágúst resigned from his post. In May 2016, Ágúst was hired as the head coach of KR men's team. He guided KR to promotion to the Úrvalsdeild but the team folded after the season as the board of Knattspyrnufélag Reykjavíkur believed that it did not have the adequate facilities to field a team in the top-tier league.

In May 2017, Ágúst returned once again to Valur as the head coach of the women's team. On 9 March 2019, he led the team to the Icelandic Women's Handball Cup. On 28 April 2019, he led Valur to the National championship.

In 2024 he won the EHF European Cup for the first time in Icelandic Women's history, beating Conservas Orbe Zendal Bm Porrino in the final over two legs with 29-29 and 25-24(54-53 agg.), That same year, he was named Coach of the Year by the Association of Sports Journalists in Iceland.

After 9 years with Valur's Women's team he got appointed Head Coach of the Valur Men's team in June 2025. In his first season he and the team won the regular season League before they went on and won the National championship after a 5-game series against FH with a sold out N1-Höllin in the deciding game.

=== National team career ===
In March 2000, Ágúst was hired as the head coach of the Iceland women's national handball team. He left the team at the conclusion of his contract in 2001.

Ágúst was formerly the head coach for the Iceland women's national handball team, and led the team at the 2011 World Women's Handball Championship in Brazil. He started training the Icelandic women national team in 2000–01 at only 25 years old.

In August 2018, Ágúst was hired as the head coach of the Faroe Islands women's national handball team.

== Titles ==
- Þjálfari Ársins
  - 2025
- EHF European Cup:
  - Champion : 2024–25
- Úrvaldsdeild Karla
  - 2026
- Úrvalsdeild kvenna
  - 2019, 2023, 2024, 2025
- Icelandic Women's Handball Cup
  - 2000, 2019, 2022, 2024
- 1. deild karla
  - 2009
