= Marija Jovanović (Serbian handballer) =

Serbian handball player (born 1995)

Personal information
- Nationality: Serbian
- Born: 31 March 1995 (age 31) Belgrade, FR Yugoslavia
- Height: 1.74 m (5 ft 9 in)

Sport
- Sport: Handball
- Position: Left back
- Current club: ÍBV
- Number: 13

Senior clubs
- Years: Team
- 2012-2014: ŽRK Radnički Kragujevac
- 2017-2021: ŽORK Jagodina
- 2021-: ÍBV
National team
| Years | Team | Apps | (Gls) |
| 2015– | Serbia | 15 | (5) |

Marija Jovanović (Serbian Cyrillic: Марија Јовановић; born 31 March 1995) is a Serbian handball player for ÍBV and the Serbian national team.

She represented Serbia at the 2021 World Women's Handball Championship.
