= Bryndís Valsdóttir =

Icelandic football player

Personal information
- Date of birth: 23 January 1964 (age 62)
- Place of birth: Reykjavík, Iceland
- Position: Forward

Senior career*
Years	Team	Apps	(Gls)
197?–1984	Valur		
1985–1986	Giugliano		
1986–1994	Valur		

International career
1992–1994	Iceland	3	(1)

Managerial career
- 1998-?: Grótta
- * Club domestic league appearances and goals

Bryndís Valsdóttir (born 23 January 1964) is an Icelandic philosopher and former footballer who was a member of Iceland's national team from 1992 to 1994.

== Early life ==
Bryndís was born in Reykjavík on 23 January 1964.

== Football career ==
She played the majority of her career with Valur, winning her first national championship in 1978. She played for Giugliano in the Italian Serie A from 1985 to 1986.

Following her playing career, she became the manager of Grótta.

=== Titles ===
- Icelandic Championships: 4

- 1978, 1986, 1988, 1989

- Cup Champions: 5

- 1984, 1986, 1987, 1988, 1990
