= Úrvalsdeild kvenna =

Úrvalsdeild kvenna is a name given to top-tier women's competitions in Iceland and may refer to:

- Úrvalsdeild kvenna (basketball), the top tier women's basketball league in Iceland
- Úrvalsdeild kvenna (football), the top tier women's football league in Iceland
- Úrvalsdeild kvenna (handball), the top tier women's handball league in Iceland
- Úrvalsdeild kvenna (ice hockey), the top tier women's ice hockey league in Iceland

== See also ==
- Úrvalsdeild karla (disambiguation)
