= Úrvalsdeild karla =

Úrvalsdeild karla is a name given to top-tier men's competitions in Iceland and may refer to:

- Úrvalsdeild karla (basketball), the top tier men's basketball league in Iceland
- Úrvalsdeild karla (football), the top tier men's football league in Iceland
- Úrvalsdeild karla (handball), the top tier men's handball league in Iceland

== See also ==
- Úrvalsdeild kvenna (disambiguation)
