= 1. deild karla =

1. deild karla is a name given to second-tier men's competitions in Iceland and may refer to:

- 1. deild karla (basketball), the second-tier men's basketball league in Iceland
- 1. deild karla (football), the second-tier men's football league in Iceland
- 1. deild karla (handball), the second-tier men's handball league in Iceland
