= Rut Arnfjörð Jónsdóttir =

Icelandic handball player (born 1990)

Rut Jónsdottir
Personal information
- Full name: Rut Arnfjörð Jónsdóttir
- Nationality: Icelandic
- Born: 21 July 1990 (age 36) Reykjavík, Iceland
- Height: 1.76 m (5 ft 9 in)

Sport
- Sport: Handball
- Position: Right Back
- Current club: Haukar
- Number: 9

Senior clubs
- Years: Team
- –2008: HK
- 2008–2014: Team Tvis Holstebro
- 2014–2016: Randers HK
- 2016–2017: FCM Håndbold
- 2017–2020: Team Esbjerg
- 2020–2024: KA/Þór
- 2024–: Haukar
National team
Years	Team	Apps	(Gls)
–	Iceland	117	(244)
- Updated on 3 November 2024

Rut Arnfjörð Jónsdóttir (born 21 July 1990 in Reykjavík) is an Icelandic handballer who plays for Haukar as a right back. She was member of the Icelandic team that participated on the 2010 European Championship, the first ever European international tournament the country qualified for.

== Achievements ==
- EHF Cup:
  - Finalist: 2011
