= KA/Þór =

Icelandic women's handball team

- Full name: KA/Þór
- Founded: 1999
- Arena: KA heimilið
- Capacity: 1,000
- Chairman: Erlingur Kristjánsson
- Head coach: Andri Snær Stefánsson
- League: Úrvalsdeild kvenna
- 2021–22: 3rd
- Club colours
Home	Away

KA/Þór is a women's handball team located in Akureyri, Iceland. It is a joint team of Knattspyrnufélag Akureyrar (KA) and Þór Akureyri. In 2021, the team won the Icelandic championship for the first time.

== History ==
Prior to the 2012-2013 season, the team withdrew from play in Úrvalsdeild kvenna after five of its most experienced players left the team during the summer. In January 2017, the board of KA declared that it intended to break the cooperation between the clubs in handball and women's football. The clubs had been sending a joint team in men's and women's handball called Akureyri Handboltafélag and KA/Þór, and in women's football under the name Þór/KA. In the end, KA reversed on its decision regarding the women's teams but withdrew from the cooperation of the men´s handball team. The football team, Þór/KA went on to win the 2017 national championship while the handball team, KA/Þór, won the second-tier 1. deild kvenna in 2018 and gained promotion to Úrvalsdeild kvenna.

On 6 September 2020, KA/Þór won the Super Cup by beating Fram 30-23. In May 2021, the team posted the best record in the Úrvalsdeild for the first time. On 6 June 2021, the team won its first national championship after beating Valur in the Úrvalsdeild finals.

On 2 October 2021, KA/Þór won the Icelandic Cup for the first time after beating Fram in the Cup finals.

== Coaches ==
- Jónatan Magnússon 2016-2019
- Andri Snær Stefánsson 2019-

== Trophies and achievements ==
=== Titles ===
- Icelandic championship:
  - 2021
- Icelandic Cup
  - 2021
- Icelandic Super Cup:
  - 2020
- 1. deild kvenna:
  - 2018

=== Awards ===
==== Úrvalsdeild Playoffs MVP ====
- 2021 - Martha Hermannsdóttir

==== 1. deild kvenna Player of the Year ====
- 2017 - Martha Hermannsdóttir
- 2018 - Martha Hermannsdóttir

==== 1. deild kvenna Coach of the Year ====
- 2017 - Jónatan Þór Magnússon
- 2018 - Jónatan Þór Magnússon

== Team ==
=== Current squad ===
Squad for the 2022-23 season

Goalkeepers

- 1 (Croatia) Matea Lonac
- 16 (Iceland) Telma Ósk Þórhallsdóttir

Wingers
RW

- 6 (Iceland) Telma Lísa Elmarsdóttir

LW

- 5 (Iceland) Anna Mary Jónsdóttir
- 7 (Iceland) Katrín Vilhjálmsdóttir
- 11 (Iceland) Kristín Aðalheiður Jóhannsdóttir
- 17 (Iceland) Unnur Ómarsdóttir

Line players

- 4 (Iceland) Júlía Sóley Björnsdóttir
- 5 (Iceland) Hrafnhildur Irma Jónsdóttir
- 13 (Iceland) Anna Þyrí Halldórsdóttir

Back players
LB

- 23 (Iceland) Lydia GunnÞórsdóttir
- 34 (Iceland) Svala Svavarsdóttir

CB

- 18 (Brazil) Nathalia Soares
- 19 (Iceland) Hildur Marin Andrésdóttir
- 29 (Iceland) Agnes Tryggvadóttir

RB

- 9 (Iceland) Aþena Sif Einvarðsdóttir
- 25 (Iceland) Rut Arnfjörð Jónsdóttir
- 27 (Iceland) Hildur Jónsdóttir

=== Transfers ===
Transfers for the season 2023-24

Joining

Leaving

=== Technical staff ===
- (Iceland) Head Coach: Andri Snær Stefánsson
- (Iceland) Assistant coach: Sigþór Árni Heimisson
- (Iceland) Chairman: Erlingur Kristjánsson
- (Iceland) Sportdirector: Siguról Sigurðsson
- (Iceland) Team Leader: Erla Hleiður Tryggvadóttir
