= Icelandic Handball Association =

Handball governing body in Iceland

Icelandic Handball Association Icelandic: Handknattleikssamband Íslands HSÍ
- IOC nation: Iceland (ISL)
- Sport: Handball
- Other sports: Beach Handball; Wheelchair Handball
- Official website: www.hsi.is

HISTORY
- Year of formation: 11 June 1957; 69 years ago

AFFILIATIONS
- International federation: International Handball Federation (IHF)
- IHF member since: 1984; 42 years ago
- Continental association: European Handball Federation
- National Olympic Committee: National Olympic and Sports Association of Iceland

GOVERNING BODY
- President: Mr. Guðmundur B. Ólafsson (Iceland)

HEADQUARTERS
- Address: Engjavegur 6, 104 Reykjavík
- Country: Iceland
- Chief Executive: Mr. Róbert Geir Gíslason (Iceland)
- Secretary General: Mr. Róbert Geir Gíslason (Iceland)

FINANCE
- Sponsors: Powerade; KFC; Domino's; Icelandair; Hilti; Snickers Workwear; Síminn; RÚV; Uhlsport; Arion Bank; Olís; Samskip

The Icelandic Handball Association (Icelandic: Handknattleikssamband Íslands or HSÍ) is the national governing body for handball in Iceland. It is based in Reykjavík.

== Club handball ==
The federation organizes the national handball leagues for both men and women club teams and the Icelandic cup for men and women.

== International handball ==
Iceland was the host of the 1995 World Men's Handball Championship.

=== The men's team ===
The men's team has appeared frequently in large tournaments in recent decades. Their best overall result is the silver medal at the 2008 Summer Olympics. Their best result in the world championship is 5th place in 1997. They have made it to the semi-finals of the European Men's Handball Championship twice, winning the bronze medal in 2010. Head coach for the men's national team is Guðmundur Guðmundsson.

=== The women's team ===
The women's team has just recently started to appear in large tournaments. They have made it to the world championship once, finishing in 12th place in 2011. They have appeared in the European championship twice, finishing in 15th place in both 2010 and 2012. The team has never made it to the Olympic Games. Head coach for the women's national team is Ágúst Þór Jóhannsson.
