= Icelandic Women's Handball Cup =

Handball competition

- Sport: Handball
- Founded: 1975
- First season: 1975-76 season
- Country: Iceland
- Continent: (European Union) Europe
- Most recent champions: KA/Þór (1st title)
- Most titles: Fram (15 titles)
- Broadcaster: RÚV
- Related competitions: Úrvalsdeild kvenna
- Website: hsi.is

The Icelandic Women's Handball Cup (Icelandic: Bikarkeppni kvenna í handknattleik), also known as Coca-Cola Cup since 2013 for sponsorship reasons, is an annual handball competition between clubs in Iceland. It is run by the Icelandic Handball Association.

The current champions are KA/Þór who won their 1st title on 2 October 2021.

== Title holders ==
- 2015 Grótta
- 2016 Stjarnan
- 2017 Stjarnan
- 2018 Fram
- 2019 Valur
- 2021 KA/Þór

== Titles ==
Team	Titles
Fram	15
Stjarnan	8
Valur	7
Haukar	4
ÍBV	3
Víkingur Reykjavík	2
Grótta	1
Ármann	1
FH	1
ÍR	1
KA/Þór	1
KR	1
