= Selfoss (women's handball) =

Icelandic women's handball team

- Full name: Ungmennafelag Selfoss
- Short name: Selfoss
- Founded: 2011
- Arena: Hleðsluhöllin, Selfossׂ
- Capacity: 800
- President: Þórir Haraldsson
- Head coach: Eyþór Lárusson
- League: Úrvalsdeild kvenna
- 2018-2019: 8th
- Club colours
Home	Away

The Selfoss women's handball team is the women's handball section of Icelandic multi-sport club Selfoss from Selfoss. It currently plays in the Úrvalsdeild kvenna

== Players ==
=== Current squad ===
As of the 2019–20 season.

Goalkeepers (GK)

- 12 (Iceland) Dröfn Sveinsdóttir
- 15 (Denmark) Henriette Ostergaard

Left Wingers (LW)

- }9 (Iceland) Rakel Guðjónsdóttir
- 11 (Iceland) Agnes Sigurðardóttir
- 12 (Iceland) Elínborg Katla Þorbjörnsdóttir

Right Wingers (RW)

- 23 (Iceland) Þuríður Ósk Ingimarsdóttir
- 81 (Romania) Carmen Palmariu

Pivots (P)

- 30 (Iceland) Katla Björg Ómarsdóttir
- 37 (Iceland) Sigríður Lilja Sigurðardóttir

Left Backs (LB)

- 3 (Iceland) Hulda Dís Þrastardóttir
- 19 (Iceland) Katla Björg Magnúsdóttir

Central Backs (CB)

- 3 (Iceland) Hólmfríður Arna Steinsdóttir
- 33 (Iceland) Sólveig Erla Oddsdóttir

Right Backs (RB)

- 20 (Iceland) Tinna Sigurrós Traustadóttir
- 21 (Iceland) Elín Krista Sigurðardóttir
