= Gunnar Gunnarsson (handballer) =

Icelandic handball player (born 1961)

Personal information
- Nationality: Icelandic
- Born: 2 June 1961 (age 65)

Sport
- Sport: Handball
National team
Years	Team	Apps	(Gls)
–	Iceland	75	(92)

Gunnar Gunnarsson (born 2 June 1961) is an Icelandic former handball player who competed in the 1992 Summer Olympics. He was known for his speed and agility across the court.
