= ÍBV (women's handball) =

Icelandic handball team

- Full name: ÍBV-íþróttafélag
- Short name: ÍBV
- Founded: 1903; 123 years ago
- Arena: Itrottamidstöd Vestmannaeyja
- Capacity: 800
- Head coach: Sigurður Bragason
- League: Úrvalsdeild kvenna
- 2021-22: 4th
- Club colours
Home	Away

The ÍBV women's handball team is the women's handball department of ÍBV-íþróttafélag (English: ÍBV sports club). As of the 2017-2018 season, they play in the Úrvalsdeild kvenna.

== History ==
ÍBV won their first women's national championship in 2000 and followed up by winning it in 2003, 2004 and 2006.

== Coaches ==
- (Iceland) Hrafnhildur Skúladóttir 2015-2019
- (Iceland) Sigurður Bragason 2019-present

== Notable players ==
- (Iceland) Sandra Erlingsdóttir
- (Iceland) Díana Dögg Magnusdottir
- (Iceland) Birna Berg Haraldsdóttir
- (Austria) Birgit Engl
- (Denmark) Anja Nielsen
- (Bulgaria) Ekaterina Dzhukeva
- (Serbia) Marija Jovanović
- (Portugal) Vera Lopes

== Trophies and achievements ==
- Icelandic champions (4):
  - 2000, 2003, 2004, 2006
- Icelandic Handball Cup (3):
  - 2001, 2002, 2004
- Division I (2):
  - 1986, 1988

== Team ==
=== Current squad ===
Squad for the 2022-23 season

Goalkeepers

- 1 (Iceland) Bernódía Sif Sigurðardóttir
- 12 (Iceland) Tara Sól Úranusdóttir
- 16 (Iceland) Dröfn Haraldsdóttir
- 27 (Poland) Marta Wawrzynkowska

Wingers
RW

- 21 (Iceland) Sara Dröfn Richardsdóttir

LW

- 2 (Faroe Islands) Ingibjørg Olsen
- 6 (Iceland) Harpa Valey Gylfadóttir
- 34 (Iceland) Amelia Dís Einársdóttir

Line players

- 8 (Iceland) Herdis Eiriksdóttir
- 14 (Iceland) Elisa Eliasdóttir
- 22 (Iceland) Briet Omarsdóttir

Back players
LB

- 15 (Poland) Karolina Olszowa
- 29 (Iceland) Súnna Jónsdóttir

CB

- 7 (Iceland) Hrafnhildur Hanna Þrastardóttir
- 9 (Iceland) Olöf Maria Stefansdóttir

RB

- 5 (Iceland) Alexandra Ósk Viktorsdóttir
- 11 (Iceland) Birna Berg Haraldsdóttir
- 23 (Iceland) Ásta Júlíusdóttir
