= Fimleikafélag Hafnarfjarðar =

Icelandic sports club

- Full name: Fimleikafélag Hafnarfjarðar
- Nickname: FH-ingar
- Short name: FH
- Sports: Athletics; Football; Handball; Fencing
- Founded: 15 October 1929; 97 years ago
- Based in: Hafnarfjörður
- Chairman: Viðar Halldórsson

Fimleikafélag Hafnarfjarðar (English: Hafnarfjörður Gymnastics Club), commonly referred to as FH, is an Icelandic multi-sports club based in Hafnarfjörður. The club competes in football, handball, athletics, and fencing. It was founded in 1929 as a gymnastics club but soon started a handball department which became its flagship for several decades. Its men's football team has been a dominant power since the early 2000s.

== Football ==
=== Men's football ===
FH's men's football team has been a dominant power in Icelandic football since the early 2000s, winning several national championships.

=== Women's football ===
FH's women's football team won the first edition of the national championship in 1972. After losing the title to Ármann in 1973, FH won three successive titles in 1974, 1975 and 1976. The club was promoted from the second-tier 1. deild in 2015, and finished sixth in the 2016 Úrvalsdeild.

== Handball ==
=== Men's handball ===
==== Titles ====
- Icelandic champions
  - Winners (17): 1956, 1957, 1959, 1960, 1961, 1965, 1966, 1969, 1971, 1974, 1976, 1984, 1985, 1990, 1992, 2011, 2024
- Icelandic Men's Handball Cup
  - Winners (6): 1975, 1976, 1977, 1992, 1994, 2019
- 1. deild karla
  - Winners (1): 2008
- 2. deild karla
  - Winners (1): 1989^{1}

^{1} Won by the reserve FH-b

=== Women's handball ===
==== Titles ====
- Icelandic champions
  - Winners (3): 1961, 1981, 1982
- Icelandic Women's Handball Cup
  - Winners (1): 1981
- 1. deild kvenna
  - Winners (3): 1973, 2002^{1}, 2003^{1}

^{1} Won by the reserve FH-b
