= Íþróttafélagið Grótta =

Icelandic sports club

Coordinates: 64°9′0.6″N 21°59′45.0″W

Grótta
- Full name: Íþróttafélagið Grótta
- Founded: 24 April 1967; 59 years ago
- Location: Seltjarnarnes, Iceland
- Home ground: Vivaldivöllurinn
- Website: grotta.is

Íþróttafélagið Grótta (Icelandic pronunciation: [ˈiːˌθrouhtaˌfjɛːˌlaijɪð ˈkrouhta], lit. 'Grótta Sports Club' (Note: Íþróttafélagið is the definite form of Íþróttafélag, meaning "the sports club".)) is an Icelandic sports club based in the town of Seltjarnarnes, in the Capital Region. The club is best known for its women's handball team that won the national championship in 2015 and 2016, but also has departments for gymnastics, football and powerlifting.

== History ==
Grótta was officially founded on 24 April 1967 by Garðar Guðmundsson, a football supporter from Seltjarnarnes who had begun the process of forming a club the previous year. Initially the club had only a football team but later expanded to include handball (1969), gymnastics (1985) and powerlifting (2013). The club has over the years tried to incorporate sports including basketball, skiing and chess but they have all failed.

On 24 April 2007, the club held a festival to celebrate the 40th anniversary of its foundation. The day included a parade through the town with a brass band, displays by the club's various teams, addresses by the mayor and chairman and a gala.

== Football ==
Grótta
- Full name: Knattspyrnudeild Gróttu
- Founded: 24 April 1967; 59 years ago
- Ground: Vivaldivöllurinn, Seltjarnarnes
- Capacity: 1,000
- Manager: Christopher Brazell
- League: 1. deild karla
- 2026: 1. deild karla, 8th of 12
Home colours	Away colours

=== Home court ===
The football team plays its home matches at the Vivaldi stadium, which has an artificial grass playing surface and a capacity of 300 spectators.

=== Men's team ===
==== History ====
In 2007, the men's football team was promoted to the 2. deild karla after defeating BÍ/Bolungarvík 5–1 on aggregate in the play-offs. In 2010, the side won promotion to the 1. deild karla and remained there for two seasons before returning to the third tier for the 2012 campaign. It returned to the 1. deild in 2017 but were relegated straight away. However, they won promotion again the following year. In 2019 they then produced what has been referred to as one of the most surprising seasons in Icelandic football history when they won the 1. deild and were promoted to the top tier of Icelandic football for the first time in the club's history. Current Brentford goalkeeper Hákon Valdimarsson played in goal for Grótta during their 1. deild success.

==== Honours ====
- 1. deild karla:

2019

- 2. deild karla:

2009

- 3. deild karla:

1991

=== Current squad ===
As of 22 July 2026

Note: Flags indicate national team as defined under FIFA eligibility rules; some limited exceptions apply. Players may hold more than one non-FIFA nationality.

No.	Pos.	Nation	Player
1	GK	ISL	Alexander Arnarsson
2	DF	ISL	Hrannar Ingi Magnússon
3	DF	DEN	Jonatan Bragason
4	DF	ISL	Dagur Bjarkason
5	DF	ISL	Patrik Orri Pétursson
7	FW	ISL	Björgvin Brimi Andrésson (on loan from Víkingur)
8	DF	USA	Caden McLagan
9	FW	ISL	Andri Freyr Jónasson
10	MF	ISL	Grímur Ingi Jakobsson
11	MF	ISL	Axel Sigurðarson
12	GK	ISL	Guðmundur Rafn Ingason
13	FW	ISL	Björgvin Stefánsson
14	DF	ISL	Einar Tómas Sveinbjarnarson

No.	Pos.	Nation	Player
16	DF	ISL	Halldór Hilmir Thorsteinson
18	MF	ISL	Elmar Freyr Hauksson
19	MF	ISL	Alexander Emil Stéfansson
20	FW	ISL	Kristófer Dan Þórðarson
21	DF	ISL	Tristan Freyr Ingólfsson
22	MF	ISL	Viktor Orri Guðmundsson
23	MF	ISL	Birgir Davidsson Scheving
24	DF	ISL	Nökkvi Nökkvason
30	MF	ISL	Mattías Kjeld
77	MF	ISL	Daníel Agnar Ásgeirsson
96	DF	ISL	Emil Skúli Einarsson
—	DF	ISL	Daði Már Patrekur Jóhannsson
—	FW	ISL	Valdimar Daði Sævarsson

=== Out on loan ===
Note: Flags indicate national team as defined under FIFA eligibility rules; some limited exceptions apply. Players may hold more than one non-FIFA nationality.

No. / Pos. / Nation / Player	No. / Pos. / Nation / Player

=== Women's team ===
==== Notable managers ====
- (Iceland) Bryndís Valsdóttir

== Handball ==
=== Women's team ===
==== Honours ====
- Úrvalsdeild kvenna (2):

2015, 2016

- Icelandic Women's Handball Cup:

2015

==== Notable players ====
- (Iceland) Lovísa Thompson 2014–2018

=== Men's team ===
==== Notable players ====
- (Iceland) Alexander Petersson 1998–2003
- (Lithuania) Gintaras Savukynas 2003–2004
- (Iceland) Guðjón Valur Sigurðsson 1991–1998
- (Iceland) Viggó Kristjánsson 2010–2016

== Gymnastics ==
Around 1200 participants are in the Gymnastics department. Around 20% are from Seltjarnarnes and 80% are from the neighboring town of Reykjavík. Both Artistic gymnastics and TeamGym are taught at the club. Olympic gold medalist Szilveszter Csollány was hired as a coach in 2011.

In 2016-2019 the Gymnastics department went under major reconstruction where the house was rebuilt bigger and new equipment was bought which has greatly improved the facilities for the participants.
