= Úrvalsdeild kvenna (handball) =

Icelandic women's handball competition

- Founded: 1939
- No. of teams: 8
- Country: Iceland
- Confederation: EHF
- Most recent champion: Valur (20th title)
- Most titles: Fram (23rd title)
- Level on pyramid: 1
- Relegation to: 1. deild kvenna
- International cups: EHF Cup; EHF Challenge Cup
- Website: hsi.is
- 2025–26

Úrvalsdeild kvenna (English: Women's Premier League), also known as Olís deild kvenna for sponsorship reasons, is the highest women's handball competition among clubs in Iceland, where play determines the national champion. It is managed by the Icelandic Handball Association.

The current champions are Valur who won the national championship for the 20th time in 2025.

== 2021/22 Season participants ==
The following 8 clubs compete in the Olís deild karla during the 2021–22 season.

Team	City	Arena
KA/Þór	Akureyri	KA heimilið
Fram	Reykjavík	Framhús
Haukar Handball	Hafnarfjörður	Schenkerhöllin
ÍBV	Vestmannaeyjar	Vestmannaeyjar
Valur	Reykjavík	Valshöllin
Afturelding	Mosfellsbær	Íþróttamiðstöðin Varmá
Stjarnan	Garðabær	TM Höllin
HK	Kópavogur	Kórinn

== Úrvalsdeild kvenna past champions ==
- 1940 : Ármann
- 1941 : Ármann (2)
- 1942 : Ármann (3)
- 1943 : Ármann (4)
- 1944 : Ármann (5)
- 1945 : Haukar
- 1946 : Haukar (2)
- 1947 : Ármann (6)
- 1948 : Ármann (7)
- 1949 : Ármann (8)
- 1950 : Fram
- 1951 : Fram (2)
- 1952 : Fram (3)
- 1953 : Fram (4)
- 1954 : Fram (5)
- 1955 : KR
- 1956 : Ármann (9)
- 1957 : Þróttur Reykjavík
- 1958 : Ármann (9)
- 1959 : KR (2)
- 1960 : Ármann (11)
- 1961 : FH Hafnarfjörður
- 1962 : Valur
- 1963 : Ármann (12)
- 1964 : Valur (2)
- 1965 : Valur (3)
- 1966 : Valur (4)
- 1967 : Valur (5)
- 1968 : Valur (6)
- 1969 : Valur (7)
- 1970 : Fram (7)
- 1971 : Valur (8)
- 1972 : Valur (9)
- 1973 : Valur (10)
- 1974 : Fram (7)
- 1975 : Valur (11)
- 1976 : Fram (8)
- 1977 : Fram (9)
- 1978 : Fram (10)
- 1979 : Fram (11)
- 1980 : Fram (12)
- 1981 : FH Hafnarfjörður (2)
- 1982 : FH Hafnarfjörður (3)
- 1983 : Valur (12)
- 1984 : Fram (13)
- 1985 : Fram (14)
- 1986 : Fram (15)
- 1987 : Fram (16)
- 1988 : Fram (17)
- 1989 : Fram (18)
- 1990 : Fram (19)
- 1991 : Stjarnan
- 1992 : Víkingur Reykjavík
- 1993 : Víkingur Reykjavík (2)
- 1994 : Víkingur Reykjavík (3)
- 1995 : Stjarnan (2)
- 1996 : Haukar
- 1997 : Haukar (2)
- 1998 : Stjarnan (3)
- 1999 : Stjarnan (4)
- 2000 : ÍBV
- 2001 : Haukar (5)
- 2002 : Haukar (6)
- 2003 : ÍBV (2)
- 2004 : ÍBV (3)
- 2005 : Haukar (7)
- 2006 : ÍBV (4)
- 2007 : Stjarnan (5)
- 2008 : Stjarnan (6)
- 2009 : Stjarnan (7)
- 2010 : Valur (13)
- 2011 : Valur (14)
- 2012 : Valur (15)
- 2013 : Fram (20)
- 2014 : Valur (16)
- 2015 : Grótta
- 2016 : Grótta (2)
- 2017 : Fram (21)
- 2018 : Fram (22)
- 2019 : Valur (17)
- 2020 : Not awarded due to the COVID-19 pandemic
- 2021 : KA/Þór (1)
- 2022 : Fram (23)
- 2023 : Valur (18)
- 2024 : Valur (19)
- 2025 : Valur (20)

== Awards ==
=== Playoffs MVP ===
Season	Name	Position	Team
2016–2017	(Iceland) Guðrún Ósk Maríasdóttir	Goalkeeper	Fram
2017–2018	(Iceland) Steinunn Björnsdóttir	Defender	Fram
2018–2019	(Iceland) Íris Björk Símonardóttir	Goalkeeper	Valur
2020–2021	(Iceland) Rut Arnfjörð Jónsdóttir	Right back	KA/Þór

== See also ==
- Úrvalsdeild kvenna (disambiguation)
- Úrvalsdeild karla (handball), the men's handball league
