= Haukar Handball =

Icelandic handball club

Haukar
- Full name: Knattspyrnufélagið Haukar
- Short name: Haukar
- Founded: 1931
- Arena: Ithrottamidstod Haukar
- Capacity: 1,800
- President: Þorgeir Haraldsson
- Head coach: Aron Kristjánsson; Gunnar Gunnarsson
- League: Úrvalsdeild karla Úrvalsdeild kvenna
- 2020-21: 2nd (men); 5th (women)
- Club colours
| Home | Away |

Haukar (Icelandic pronunciation: [ˈhøyːkar̥]) is the handball section of Icelandic sports club Haukar from Hafnarfjörður. Haukar do currently play in the Olís deildin. Haukar have often competed in the EHF Champions League among great results are victories over US Créteil Handball and FC Barcelona.

== Crest, colours, supporters ==
=== Kits ===
AWAY

2016–17

== Men's team ==
=== Trophies ===
Icelandic Championships (11):

  - 1943, 2000, 2001, 2003, 2004, 2005, 2008, 2009, 2010, 2015, 2016

Icelandic Cup: (8):

  - 1980, 1997, 2001, 2002,2010,2012,2014, 2026

Icelandic League Cup : (6):

  - 2006, 2009, 2011, 2013, 2014, 2019

EHF Cup

- Semifinal: 2000-01

=== European record ===
| Season | Competition | Round | Club | 1st leg | 2nd leg | Aggregate |
|---|---|---|---|---|---|---|
| 2016–17 | EHF Cup | R1 | (Greece) AC Diomidis Argous | 33–26 | 28–20 | 61–46 |
| 2016–17 | EHF Cup | R2 | (Sweden) Alingsås HK | 24–24 | 27–31 | 51–55 |

=== Current roster ===
Squad for the 2016-17 season

Goalkeepers

- 32 (Lithuania) Giedrius Morkūnas
- 12 (Iceland) Andri Scheving
- 16 (Iceland) Gretar Ari Gudjonsson

Outside Players

- 2 (Iceland) Tjorvi Thorgeirsson
- 3 (Iceland) Orri Freyr Þorkelsson
- 4 (Iceland) Adam Haukur Baumruk
- 6 (Iceland) Brynjolfur Snær Brynjolfsson
- 7 (Iceland) Þorður Rafn Guðmundsson
- 8 (Iceland) Elias Mar Haldorsson
- 9 (Iceland) Guðmundur Arni Olafsson
- 10 (Iceland) Heimir Oli Heimisson
- 11 (Iceland) Daniel Thor Ingason
- 14 (Iceland) Brimir Bjornsson
- 17 (Iceland) Kristinn Petursson
- 18 (Iceland) Jón Þorbjörn Jóhannsson
- 20 (Iceland) Aron Gauti Oskarsson
- 23 (Iceland) Þorarinn Levi Traustason
- 24 (Iceland) Andri Heimir Fridriksson
- 28 (Iceland) Hakon Daði Styrmisson
- 73 (Iceland) Einar Petur Petursson

=== Transfers ===
Transfers for the 2026–27 season

Joining

Leaving

- (Iceland) Jón Ómar Gíslason (LP) to (Austria) Bregenz Handball

== Women's team ==
=== Titles ===
- Olís deildin
  - Winners (7) : 1945, 1946, 1996, 1997, 2001, 2002, 2005
- Icelandic Cup
  - Winners (5) : 1997, 2003, 2006, 2007, 2025

=== European record ===
| Season | Competition | Round | Club | 1st leg | 2nd leg | Aggregate |
|---|---|---|---|---|---|---|
| 2016-17 | Challenge Cup | R3 | (Italy) Jomi Salerno | 23–19 | 27–22 | 50–41 |
| 2016-17 | Challenge Cup | 1/8 | (Netherlands) Virto/Quintus | 26–29 | 24–22 | 50–51 |

=== Current squad ===
Squad for the 2021–22 season.

Goalkeepers

- 33 (Iceland) Margrét Einarsdóttir

Wingers
LW

- 2 (Iceland) Elín Klara Þorkelsdóttir
- 19 (Iceland) Birta Lind Jóhannsdóttir

RW

- 5 (Iceland) Ragnheiður Ragnarsdóttir
- 18 (Iceland) Berta Rut Harðardóttir

Line players

- 11 (Iceland) Guðrún Jenný Sigurðardóttir
- 27 (Iceland) Gunnhildur Pétursdóttir

Back players
LB

- 20 (Iceland) Rósa Kristín Kemp
- 22 (Iceland) Rakel Oddný Guðmundsdóttir

CB

- 3 (Iceland) Berglind Benediktsdóttir
- 7 (Iceland) Anna Lára Davíðsdóttir
- 15 (Faroe Islands) Natasja Anjodóttir Hammer

RB

- 6 (Sweden) Sara Marie Oddén
- 9 (Iceland) Karen Díönudóttir
- 14 (Iceland) Ásta Björt Júlíusdóttir

=== Transfers ===
Transfers for the season 2022-23

Joining

Leaving

=== Technical staff ===
Staff for the season 2022-23.

- (Iceland) Head Coach: Gunnar Gunnarsson
- (Iceland) Assistant coach: Díana Guðjónsdóttir
- (Iceland) Team Leader: Harpa Melsted
- (Iceland) Team Leader: Alexandra Hödd Harðardóttir
- (Iceland) Doctor: Jóhann Guðmundsson
