= Fram (women's handball) =

Icelandic handball team

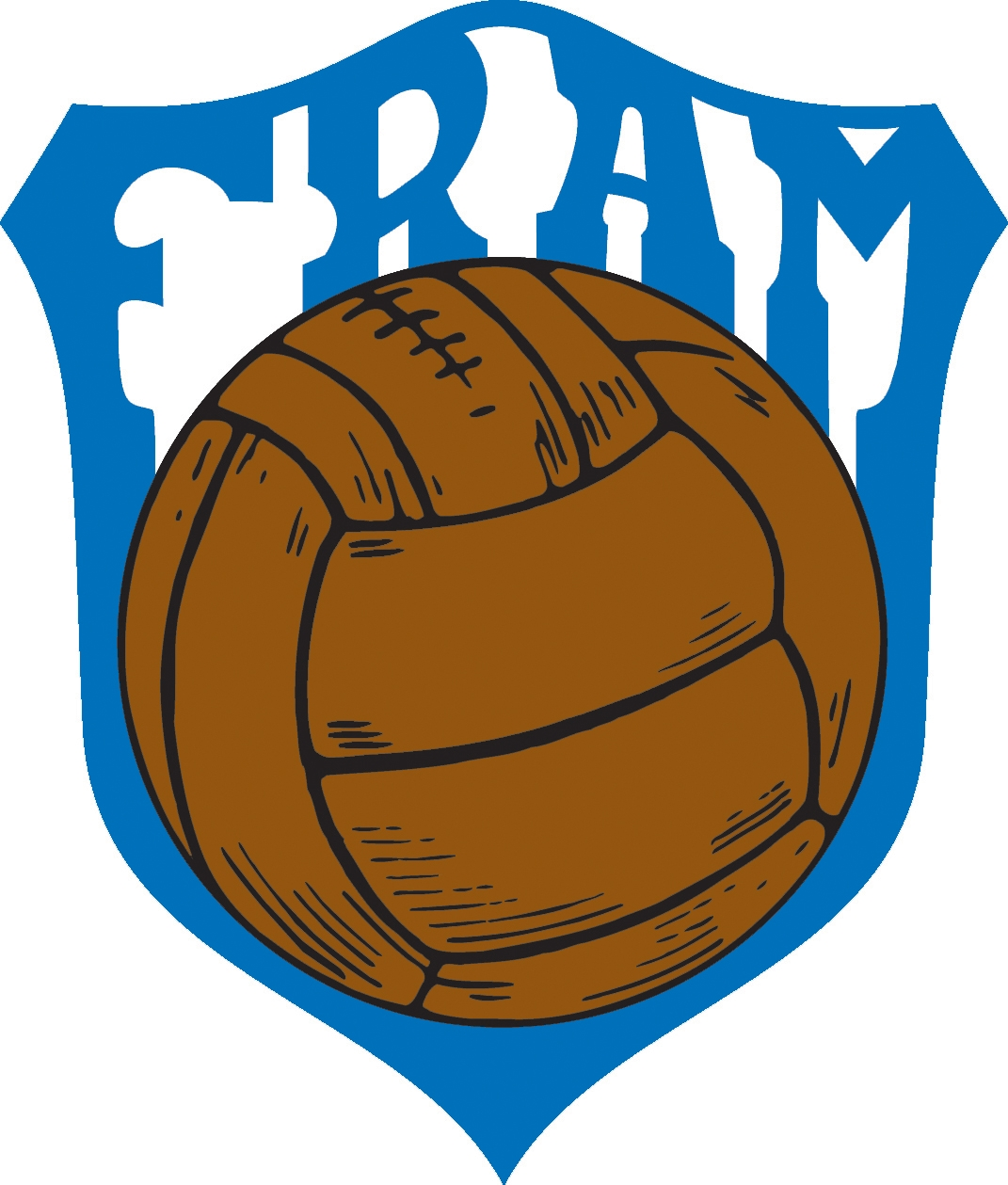
- Full name: Knattspyrnufélagið Fram
- Short name: Fram
- Founded: 1940
- Arena: Framhúsið, Reykjavíkׂ
- Capacity: 2,200
- President: Gísli Freyr Valdórsson
- Head coach: Haraldur Þorvarðarson
- League: Úrvalsdeild kvenna
- 2024–25: Semi-finals
- Club colours
Home	Away

The Fram women's handball team is the women's handball section of Icelandic multi-sport club Fram from Reykjavík. It currently plays in the Úrvalsdeild kvenna. It won both the national championship and the Icelandic Cup in 2018.

== Trophies ==
- Icelandic Champions (23):
  - 1950, 1951, 1952, 1953, 1954, 1970, 1974, 1976, 1977, 1978, 1979, 1980, 1984, 1985, 1986, 1987, 1988, 1989, 1990, 2013, 2017, 2018, 2022
- Icelandic Cup: (15):
  - 1978, 1979, 1980, 1982, 1984, 1985, 1986, 1987, 1990, 1991, 1995, 1999, 2010, 2011, 2018
- League champions(3):
  - 2019, 2020, 2022
- Icelandic League Cup (5)::
  - 2010, 2013, 2015, 2016, 2017

== Team ==
=== Current squad ===
Squad for the 2021-22 season.

Goalkeepers

- 2 (Iceland) Sara Sif Helgadóttir
- 5 (Iceland) Katrín Ósk Magnúsdóttir
- 18 (Iceland) Ástrós Anna Bender Mikaelsdóttir

Wingers
RW

- 14 (Iceland) Þórey Rósa Stefánsdóttir
- 4 (Iceland) Daðey Ásta Halfdánsdóttir

LW

- 7 (Iceland) Karólína Bæhrenz Lárudóttir
- 15 (Iceland) Harpa María Friðgeirsdóttir
- 17 (Iceland) Unnur Ómarsdóttir

Line players

- 11 (Iceland) Svala Júlía Gunnarsdóttir
- 19 (Iceland) Elva Þóra Arnardóttir
- 21 (Iceland) Steinunn Björnsdóttir
- 22 (Iceland) Jónína Hlín Hansdóttir
- 24 (Iceland) Perla Ruth Albertsdóttir

Back players

- 8 (Iceland) Kristrún Steinþórsdóttir
- 9 (Iceland) Ragnheiður Júlíusdóttir
- 16 (Iceland) Stella Sigurðardóttir
- 23 (Iceland) Lena Margrét Valdimarsdóttir

CB

- 6 (Iceland) Guðrun Erla Bjarnadóttir
- 10 (Iceland) Karen Knútsdóttir
- 13 (Iceland) Erna Guðlaug Gunnarsdóttir

RB

- 20 (Iceland) Hildur Þorgeirsdóttir
- 25 (Iceland) Margrét Björg Castillo

== Former club members ==
=== Notable former players ===
- (Iceland) Karen Knútsdóttir
- (Iceland) Hildur Þorgeirsdóttir
- (Iceland) Þórey Rósa Stefánsdóttir
- (Iceland) Stella Sigurðardóttir
- (Iceland) Steinunn Björnsdóttir
- (Iceland) Ragnheiður Júlíusdóttir
- (Iceland) Birna Berg Haraldsdóttir
- (Sweden) Emma Olsson
