= 2010 European Women's Handball Championship squads =

The following is a list of squads for each nation competing at the 2010 European Women's Handball Championship in Norway and Denmark. The tournament started on 7 December and the final took place in Herning on 19 December.

Each nation had to submit an initial squad of 28 players by 3 November 2010, but 12 of them became reserves when the final squad of 16 players was announced the day before the tournament starts.

Appearances, goals and ages as of tournament start, 7 December 2010.

== Group A ==
=== Denmark ===
Head coach: Jan Pytlick

No.	Pos.	Name	Date of birth (age)	Height	App.	Goals	Club
2	P	Mette Melgaard	3 June 1980 (age 46)	1.70m	42	60	(Denmark) Randers HK
3	RW	Maibritt Kviesgaard	15 May 1986 (age 40)	1.72m	61	138	(Denmark) SK Århus
4	P	Susan Thorsgaard	13 October 1986 (age 39)	1.89m	42	64	(Denmark) FC Midtjylland Håndbold
5	LW	Mie Augustesen	19 July 1988 (age 38)	1.77m	46	166	(Denmark) Randers HK
9	RB	Camilla Dalby	15 May 1986 (age 40)	1.82m	60	170	(Denmark) Randers HK
10	CB	Christina Krogshede	11 April 1981 (age 45)	1.72m	47	85	(Denmark) FIF
12	GK	Karin Mortensen	26 September 1977 (age 48)	1.81 m	187	4	(Denmark) FIF
14	CB	Lærke Møller	14 January 1989 (age 37)	1.71m	30	108	(Denmark) FC Midtjylland Håndbold
15	LB	Pernille Larsen	6 September 1984 (age 42)	1.84m	37	42	(Denmark) Handball Club Odense
16	GK	Christina Pedersen	15 December 1982 (age 43)	1.80m	65	1	(Denmark) Viborg HK
17	LW	Gitte Aaen	7 November 1981 (age 44)	1.67m	36	101	(Denmark) Randers HK
18	P	Kamilla Kristensen	2 September 1983 (age 43)	1.85m	81	147	(Denmark) Handball Club Odense
19	RB	Line Jørgensen	31 December 1989 (age 36)	1.86m	34	94	(Denmark) FC Midtjylland Håndbold
22	LB	Trine Troelsen	2 May 1985 (age 41)	1.72m	81	196	(Denmark) FC Midtjylland Håndbold
23	LW	Ann Nørgaard	15 September 1983 (age 42)	1.62m	25	91	(Denmark) Team Tvis Holstebro
24	CB	Berit Kristensen	2 August 1983 (age 43)	1.73m	41	63	(Denmark) Randers HK
25	LB	Rikke Skov	7 September 1980 (age 45)	1.81m	107	296	(Denmark) Viborg HK

=== Romania ===
Head coach: Radu Voina

No.	Pos.	Name	Date of birth (age)	Height	App.	Goals	Club
1	GK	Mihaela Smedescu	1 March 1986 (age 40)	1.78 m	20	0	(Romania) CS Tomis Constanța
3	RW	Magdalena Paraschiv	11 August 1982 (age 44)	1.63 m	6	4	(Romania) CS Universitatea Jolidon Cluj-Napoca
4	P	Florina Bârsan-Chintoan	6 December 1985 (age 40)	1.78 m	66	64	(Romania) CS Universitatea Jolidon Cluj-Napoca
6	LW	Roxana Han	20 May 1980 (age 46)	1.72 m	72	145	(Romania) CS Oltchim Râmnicu Vâlcea
7	RW	Adriana Nechita-Olteanu	14 November 1983 (age 42)	1.68 m	77	175	(Romania) CS Oltchim Râmnicu Vâlcea
8	LB	Cristina Neagu	26 August 1988 (age 38)	1.80 m	96	378	(Romania) CS Oltchim Râmnicu Vâlcea
9	CB	Aurelia Brădeanu	5 May 1979 (age 47)	1.80 m	196	506	(Hungary) Győri Audi ETO KC
10	P	Ionela Stanca	9 January 1981 (age 45)	1.76 m	148	413	(Romania) CS Oltchim Râmnicu Vâlcea
11	P	Oana Manea	18 April 1985 (age 41)	1.76 m	114	233	(Romania) CS Oltchim Râmnicu Vâlcea
13	RW	Cristina Vărzaru	5 December 1979 (age 46)	1.69 m	160	437	(Denmark) Viborg HK
14	CB	Ada Moldovan	15 November 1983 (age 42)	1.74 m	40	66	(Romania) HC Dunărea Brăila
15	LW	Valentina Ardean-Elisei	5 June 1982 (age 44)	1.71 m	153	642	(Romania) CS Oltchim Râmnicu Vâlcea
17	RB	Oana Şoit	3 May 1981 (age 45)	1.74 m	48	47	(Spain) Itxako Reyno de Navarra
18	LB	Adina Fiera	11 August 1985 (age 41)	1.82 m	126	317	(Romania) CS Oltchim Râmnicu Vâlcea
20	LB	Maria Tivadar	14 June 1982 (age 44)	1.78 m	73	83	(Romania) CS Universitatea Jolidon Cluj-Napoca
21	GK	Talida Tolnai	21 August 1979 (age 47)	1.87 m	94	1	(Romania) CS Oltchim Râmnicu Vâlcea
30	GK	Paula Ungureanu	30 March 1980 (age 46)	1.81 m	106	2	(Romania) CS Oltchim Râmnicu Vâlcea
55	RB	Melinda Geiger	26 March 1987 (age 39)	1.74 m	45	74	(Romania) CS Oltchim Râmnicu Vâlcea

=== Serbia ===
Head coach: Duško Milić

No.	Pos.	Name	Date of birth (age)	Height	App.	Goals	Club
1	GK	Dragica Tatalović	26 November 1984 (age 41)	1.80 m	13	1	(Serbia) HC Naisa Niš
2	LB	Suzana Ćubela	19 March 1985 (age 41)	1.85 m	3	6	(Serbia) Jagodina HC
3	RW	Katarina Krpež	2 May 1988 (age 38)	1.70 m	25	47	(Serbia) RK Zaječar
7	CB	Andrea Lekić	6 September 1987 (age 39)	1.78 m	41	200	(Slovenia) RK Krim
8	RB	Dijana Števin	23 October 1986 (age 39)	1.81 m	39	91	(Serbia) RK Zaječar
9	RB	Marina Dmitrović	23 March 1985 (age 41)	1.82 m	28	48	(Serbia) Jagodina HC
11	LB	Sanja Damnjanović	25 May 1987 (age 39)	1.77 m	45	145	(Serbia) RK Zaječar
12	GK	Slađana Đurić	17 February 1977 (age 49)	1.78 m	36	0	(Serbia) RK Zaječar
13	CB	Tanja Vučković	22 June 1981 (age 45)	1.78 m	5	7	(Serbia) RK Zaječar
14	P	Biljana Balać	19 November 1971 (age 54)	1.72 m	13	28	(Serbia) Jagodina HC
17	P	Sanja Rajović	18 May 1981 (age 45)	1.75 m	25	50	(Serbia) ŽRK Knjaz Miloš
20	P	Slađana Pop-Lazić	26 July 1988 (age 38)	1.78 m	17	12	(Serbia) RK Zaječar
27	GK	Katarina Tomašević	6 February 1984 (age 42)	1.79 m	29	0	(Spain) Akaba Bera Bera
29	RB	Jelena Živković	6 July 1991 (age 35)	1.81 m	9	3	(Serbia) RK Zaječar
30	LW	Jelena Nišavić	17 September 1980 (age 45)	1.68 m	3	6	(Serbia) RK Zaječar
88	LW	Jovana Bartošić	28 May 1985 (age 41)	1.65 m	31	82	(Serbia) RK Zaječar

=== Spain ===
Head coach: Jorge Dueñas

No.	Pos.	Name	Date of birth (age)	Height	App.	Goals	Club
1	GK	Cristina González	6 August 1983 (age 43)	1.79 m	62	0	(Spain) C.Le.Ba León
3	CB	Andrea Barnó	4 January 1980 (age 46)	1.74 m	44	59	(Spain) Itxako Reyno de Navarra
4	RW	Carmen Martín	29 May 1988 (age 38)	1.69 m	72	167	(Spain) Itxako Reyno de Navarra
6	LB	Nely Carla Alberto	2 July 1983 (age 43)	1.79 m	42	122	(France) Le Havre AC Handball
7	LB	Beatriz Fernández	19 March 1985 (age 41)	1.80 m	89	204	(Spain) Akaba Bera Bera
8	P	Verónica Cuadrado	8 March 1979 (age 47)	1.82 m	112	118	(Spain) BM Sagunto
9	RB	Marta Mangué	23 April 1983 (age 43)	1.70 m	174	697	(Denmark) Team Esbjerg
10	CB	Macarena Aguilar	12 March 1985 (age 41)	1.70 m	107	336	(Spain) Itxako Reyno de Navarra
11	CB	Nuria Benzal	3 April 1985 (age 41)	1.69 m	41	83	(Spain) C.Le.Ba León
12	GK	Silvia Navarro	20 March 1979 (age 47)	1.65 m	26	0	(Spain) Itxako Reyno de Navarra
13	RW	Jessica Alonso	20 September 1983 (age 42)	1.75 m	30	58	(Spain) Itxako Reyno de Navarra
14	LB	Elisabet Chávez	17 November 1990 (age 35)	1.92 m	42	8	(Spain) BM Sagunto
17	LW	Elisabeth Pinedo	13 May 1981 (age 45)	1.77 m	76	152	(Denmark) Handball Club Odense
18	P	Begoña Fernández (captain)	22 March 1980 (age 46)	1.83 m	126	279	(Spain) Itxako Reyno de Navarra
21	LW	Vanessa Amorós	7 December 1982 (age 43)	1.67 m	43	42	(Spain) BM Elda Prestigio
25	LB	Nerea Pena	13 December 1989 (age 36)	1.75 m	17	33	(Spain) Itxako Reyno de Navarra

== Group B ==
=== Croatia ===
Head coach: Vladimir Canjuga

No.	Pos.	Name	Date of birth (age)	Height	App.	Goals	Club
1	GK	Jelena Grubišić	20 January 1987 (age 39)	1.84 m	59	5	(Slovenia) RK Krim
2	CB	Miranda Tatari	20 September 1983 (age 42)	1.74 m	77	232	(Croatia) RK Podravka Koprivnica
5	RW	Dijana Golubić	21 May 1984 (age 42)	1.70 m	136	350	(Denmark) Team Esbjerg
6	P	Andrea Šerić	3 May 1985 (age 41)	1.84 m	20	28	(Croatia) Lokomotiva Zagreb
8	RW	Anita Gaće	14 April 1983 (age 43)	1.77 m	90	115	(Croatia) RK Podravka Koprivnica
10	LW	Nikica Pušić	19 March 1983 (age 43)	1.77 m	149	339	(Croatia) RK Podravka Koprivnica
11	P	Martina Pavić	27 October 1988 (age 37)	1.78 m	16	38	(Serbia) RK Zaječar
13	RB	Lidija Horvat	5 May 1982 (age 44)	1.84 m	120	243	(France) Metz Handball
14	CB	Kristina Franić	22 May 1987 (age 39)	1.80 m	76	244	(France) Metz Handball
15	LB	Andrea Penezić	13 November 1985 (age 40)	1.86 m	75	276	(Slovenia) RK Krim
16	GK	Ivana Jelčić	16 March 1980 (age 46)	1.79 m	154	0	(Croatia) RK Podravka Koprivnica
19	LW	Maja Zebić	30 May 1982 (age 44)	1.78 m	112	242	(Croatia) RK Podravka Koprivnica
20	P	Vesna Milanović-Litre	30 May 1986 (age 40)	1.80 m	36	38	(Croatia) RK Podravka Koprivnica
23	LW	Nina Jukopila	6 June 1983 (age 43)	1.73 m	18	21	(Croatia) RK Trešnjevka
24	P	Dina Havić	13 November 1987 (age 38)	1.89 m	10	16	(Croatia) RK Arena
26	RB	Žana Čović	20 August 1989 (age 37)	1.80 m	0	0	(Croatia) ŽRK Dalmatinka

=== Iceland ===
Head coach: Júlíus Jónasson

No.	Pos.	Name	Date of birth (age)	Height	App.	Goals	Club
2	CB	Karen Knútsdóttir	4 February 1990 (age 36)	1.67 m	16	41	(Iceland) Knattspyrnufélagið Fram
3	P	Arna Sif Pálsdóttir	5 January 1988 (age 38)	1.80 m	46	51	(Denmark) Team Esbjerg
4	CB	Sigurbjörg Jóhannsdóttir	23 June 1987 (age 39)	1.70 m	29	20	(Iceland) Knattspyrnufélagið Fram
5	RB	Rut Jónsdóttir	21 July 1990 (age 36)	1.76 m	30	53	(Denmark) Team Tvis Holstebro
6	CB	Harpa Sif Eyjólfsdóttir	9 May 1987 (age 39)	1.78 m	24	52	(Sweden) Spårvagen HF
7	LB	Rakel Dögg Bragadóttir	24 May 1986 (age 40)	1.77 m	69	210	(Norway) Levanger HK
9	LW	Rebekka Skúladóttir	25 October 1988 (age 37)	1.73 m	13	9	(Iceland) Valur
10	RW	Solveig Lára Kjærnested	3 November 1985 (age 40)	1.65 m	43	90	(Iceland) Stjarnan
11	LB	Þorgerður Atladóttir	2 June 1992 (age 34)	1.72 m	4	1	(Iceland) Stjarnan
12	GK	Berglind Íris Hansdóttir	14 October 1981 (age 44)	1.75 m	99	33	(Norway) Fredrikstad BK
13	LW	Ásta Birna Gunnarsdóttir	29 October 1984 (age 41)	1.67 m	33	49	(Iceland) Fram
14	LB	Hrafnhildur Skúladóttir	9 August 1977 (age 49)	1.77 m	121	487	(Iceland) Valur
15	RW	Hanna Guðrún Stefánsdóttir	11 February 1979 (age 47)	1.61 m	92	365	(Iceland) Stjarnan
16	GK	Íris Björk Símonardóttir	26 June 1987 (age 39)	1.75 m	51	4	(Iceland) Fram
17	P	Anna Úrsula Guðmundsdóttir	1 May 1985 (age 41)	1.81 m	56	130	(Iceland) Valur
19	RB	Sunna Jónsdóttir	26 February 1989 (age 37)	1.77 m	13	12	(Iceland) Knattspyrnufélagið Fram

=== Montenegro ===
Head coach: Dragan Adžić

No.	Pos.	Name	Date of birth (age)	Height	App.	Goals	Club
1	GK	Marina Vukčević	24 August 1983 (age 43)	1.73 m			(Montenegro) ŽRK Budućnost
2	RW	Radmila Miljanić	19 April 1988 (age 38)	1.83 m			(Montenegro) ŽRK Budućnost
4	RW	Jovanka Radičević	23 October 1986 (age 39)	1.69 m			(Montenegro) ŽRK Budućnost
8	LB	Marija Jovanović	26 December 1985 (age 40)	1.82 m			(Montenegro) ŽRK Budućnost
9	CB	Ana Radović	21 August 1986 (age 40)	1.76 m			(Montenegro) ŽRK Budućnost
10	CB	Anđela Bulatović	15 January 1987 (age 39)	1.64 m			(Montenegro) ŽRK Budućnost
12	GK	Sonja Barjaktarović	11 September 1986 (age 39)	1.80 m			(Montenegro) ŽRK Budućnost
13	LB	Gabriella Kindl	15 September 1979 (age 46)	1.87 m			(Montenegro) ŽRK Budućnost
14	LW	Maja Savić	29 April 1976 (age 50)	1.73 m			(Denmark) Viborg HK
16	GK	Mirjana Milenković	14 March 1985 (age 41)	1.83 m			(Montenegro) ŽRK Biseri
17	CB	Bojana Popović	20 November 1979 (age 46)	1.85 m			(Montenegro) ŽRK Budućnost
18	RB	Jelena Marković	20 April 1990 (age 36)	1.78 m			(Montenegro) ŽRK Budućnost
25	LB	Sandra Nikčević	16 January 1984 (age 42)				(Croatia) RK Podravka Koprivnica
26	P	Suzana Lazović	28 January 1992 (age 34)	1.76 m			(Montenegro) ŽRK Budućnost
77	LW	Majda Mehmedović	25 May 1990 (age 36)	1.71 m			(Montenegro) ŽRK Budućnost
90	CB	Milena Knežević	12 March 1990 (age 36)	1.78 m			(Montenegro) ŽRK Budućnost

=== Russia ===
Head coach: Yevgeni Trefilov

No.	Pos.	Name	Date of birth (age)	Height	App.	Goals	Club
2	LW	Polina Kuznetcova	10 June 1987 (age 39)	1.67 m	49	125	(Russia) Zvezda Zvenigorod
4	RB	Anna Kochetova	4 May 1987 (age 39)	1.78 m	32	101	(Russia) HC Dinamo Volgograd
11	CB	Olga Levina	4 March 1985 (age 41)	1.80 m	67	188	(Russia) HC Dinamo Volgograd
12	GK	Anna Sedoykina	1 August 1984 (age 42)	1.90 m	54	2	(Russia) HC Dinamo Volgograd
13	RW	Marina Yartseva	17 February 1989 (age 37)	1.65 m	23	45	(Russia) Rostov-Don
14	P	Kseniya Makeeva	19 September 1990 (age 35)	1.85 m	15	28	(Russia) HC Dinamo Volgograd
16	GK	Maria Sidorova	21 November 1979 (age 46)	1.78 m	137	2	(Russia) HC Lada Togliatti
18	RB	Ekaterina Davydenko	7 March 1989 (age 37)	1.84 m	19	59	(Russia) HC Lada Togliatti
19	P	Ekaterina Vetkova	1 August 1986 (age 40)	1.82 m	40	78	(Russia) Zvezda Zvenigorod
21	LB	Victoria Zhilinskayte	6 March 1989 (age 37)	1.88 m	34	53	(Russia) HC Lada Togliatti
24	LB	Oxana Koroleva	17 July 1984 (age 42)	1.85 m	70	103	(Russia) Zvezda Zvenigorod
25	RW	Emiliya Turey	6 October 1984 (age 41)	1.75 m	138	466	(Spain) SD Itxako
26	CB	Tatiana Khmyrova	6 February 1990 (age 36)	1.78 m	20	85	(Russia) HC Dinamo Volgograd
27	LB	Anna Sen	12 March 1990 (age 36)	1.85 m	5	15	(Russia) Kuban Krasnodar
29	RW	Olga Chernoivanenko	17 April 1989 (age 37)	1.75 m	11	23	(Russia) HC Lada Togliatti
38	LB	Olga Gorshenina	9 November 1990 (age 35)	1.82 m	3	7	(Russia) HC Lada Togliatti

== Group C ==
=== Germany ===
Head coach: Rainer Osmann

No.	Pos.	Name	Date of birth (age)	Height	App.	Goals	Club
1	GK	Sabine Englert	27 November 1981 (age 44)	1.85 m	183	2	(Denmark) FC Midtjylland Håndbold
2	LW	Nadine Härdter	29 March 1981 (age 45)	1.66 m	158	252	(Germany) VfL Sindelfingen
3	RW	Isabell Klein	28 June 1984 (age 42)	1.72 m	26	41	(Germany) Buxtehuder SV
4	RB	Grit Jurack	22 October 1977 (age 48)	1.86 m	294	1557	(Denmark) Viborg HK
5	LB	Saskia Lang	19 December 1986 (age 39)	1.79 m	4	4	(Germany) HSG Blomberg-Lippe
6	RB	Franziska Mietzner	20 December 1988 (age 37)	1.92 m	32	106	(Germany) Frankfurter HC
7	CB	Nina Wörz	14 November 1980 (age 45)	1.80 m	189	394	(Denmark) Randers HK
8	CB	Randy Bülau	24 November 1981 (age 44)	1.69 m	4	2	(Germany) Buxtehuder SV
10	CB	Anna Loerper	18 November 1984 (age 41)	1.64 m	134	235	(Germany) TSV Bayer 04 Leverkusen
12	GK	Katja Schülke	18 March 1984 (age 42)	1.78 m	49	0	(Germany) HC Leipzig
13	LW	Natalie Augsburg	15 November 1983 (age 42)	1.76 m	9	21	(Germany) HC Leipzig
15	RW	Sabrina Richter	10 May 1982 (age 44)	1.76 m	123	263	(Germany) HSG Blomberg-Lippe
16	GK	Clara Woltering	2 March 1983 (age 43)	1.78 m	117	0	(Germany) TSV Bayer 04 Leverkusen
18	LB	Laura Steinbach	2 August 1985 (age 41)	1.81 m	55	85	(Germany) TSV Bayer 04 Leverkusen
20	P	Anja Althaus	3 September 1982 (age 44)	1.77 m	175	391	(Denmark) Viborg HK
22	RB	Susann Müller	26 May 1988 (age 38)	1.86 m	50	114	(Denmark) SK Århus

=== Netherlands ===
Head coach: Henk Groener

No.	Pos.	Name	Date of birth (age)	Height	App.	Goals	Club
1	GK	Marieke van der Wal	7 November 1979 (age 46)	1.82 m	105	0	(Germany) Frisch Auf Göppingen
2	GK	Ingeborg Roelofs	27 November 1983 (age 42)	1.78 m	44	0	(Sweden) Kiddy World
6	RB	Laura van der Heijden	27 June 1990 (age 36)	1.72 m	44	125	(Germany) VfL Oldenburg
7	RW	Debbie Bont	9 December 1990 (age 35)	1.74 m	21	33	(Netherlands) T+A/VOC Amsterdam
8	LB	Lois Abbingh	13 August 1992 (age 34)	1.77 m	11	29	(Germany) VfL Oldenburg
9	P	Marcella Deen	19 June 1988 (age 38)	1.72 m	27	28	(Germany) VfL Sindelfingen
10	P	Danick Snelder	22 May 1990 (age 36)	1.78 m	19	46	(Germany) Thüringer HC
11	LW	Miranda Robben	13 December 1986 (age 39)	1.67 m	85	127	(Germany) HSG Bad Wildungen
12	CB	Diane Lamein	18 October 1979 (age 46)	1.70 m	267	563	(Germany) Buxtehuder SV
13	LW	Joyce Hilster	1 June 1983 (age 43)	1.72 m	83	170	(Germany) Frisch Auf Göppingen
14	RB	Willemijn Karsten	28 June 1986 (age 40)	1.73 m	72	96	(Germany) DJK/MJC Trier
15	CB	Maura Visser	1 June 1985 (age 41)	1.77 m	94	323	(Denmark) KIF Vejen
17	RB	Cornelia Groot	4 May 1988 (age 38)	1.75 m	18	49	(Denmark) Team Tvis Holstebro
19	LB	Pearl van der Wissel	14 April 1984 (age 42)	1.71 m	178	476	(Germany) Thüringer HC
26	RW	Angela Malestein	31 January 1993 (age 33)	1.74 m	10	7	(Netherlands) T+A/VOC Amsterdam
27	GK	Debbie Klijn	29 December 1975 (age 50)	1.73 m	113	1	(Germany) Buxtehuder SV

=== Sweden ===
Head coach: Per Johansson

No.	Pos.	Name	Date of birth (age)	Height	App.	Goals	Club
3	P	Kristina Flognman	29 June 1981 (age 45)	1.78 m	166	316	(France) Toulon Saint Cyr Var HB
4	LW	Matilda Boson	4 December 1981 (age 44)	1.76 m	161	401	(Sweden) Spårvägens HF
6	RB	Therese Islas Helgesson	22 July 1983 (age 43)	1.69 m	75	145	(France) Toulon Saint Cyr Var HB
8	LB	Jamina Roberts	28 May 1990 (age 36)	1.75 m	0	0	(Sweden) IK Sävehof
10	RW	Annika Wiel Fredén	21 August 1978 (age 48)	1.76 m	71	196	(Sweden) BK Heid
12	GK	Gabriella Kain	25 March 1981 (age 45)	1.79 m	37	0	(Denmark) KIF Vejen
16	GK	Cecilia Skagerstam	2 September 1986 (age 40)	1.78 m	22	0	(Sweden) IK Sävehof
17	LB	Linnea Torstenson	30 March 1983 (age 43)	1.86 m	85	340	(Denmark) FC Midtjylland Håndbold
18	P	Johanna Wiberg	6 September 1983 (age 43)	1.84 m	104	71	(Sweden) Eslövs IK
20	CB	Isabelle Gulldén	29 June 1989 (age 37)	1.79 m	53	117	(Sweden) IK Sävehof
22	LW	Jessica Helleberg	20 February 1986 (age 40)	1.72 m	4	9	(Sweden) IK Sävehof
23	P	Therese Wallter	1 May 1982 (age 44)	1.83 m	26	30	(Sweden) Skövde HF
24	RW	Nathalie Hagman	19 July 1991 (age 35)	1.67 m	10	8	(Sweden) Skuru IK
25	CB	Angelica Wallén	11 April 1986 (age 40)	1.71 m	15	32	(Denmark) Team Esbjerg
27	CB	Sabina Rosengren Jacobsen	24 March 1989 (age 37)	1.80 m	22	44	(Sweden) Lugi HF
31	RB	Anna-Maria Johansson	15 February 1982 (age 44)	1.84 m	12	26	(Denmark) Team Esbjerg

=== Ukraine ===
Head coach: Leonid Yevtushenko

No.	Pos.	Name	Date of birth (age)	Height	App.	Goals	Club
1	GK	Maryna Vlasenko	8 October 1987 (age 38)	1.82 m	3	0	(Ukraine) Zgia
2	LW	Yana Batkova	2 November 1988 (age 37)	1.71 m	15	15	(Ukraine) Zgia
4	LB	Anastasiia Pidpalova	5 January 1982 (age 44)	1.92 m	51	222	(Romania) CS Oltchim Râmnicu Vâlcea
5	P	Iryna Sheyenko	5 March 1983 (age 43)	1.80 m	63	158	(Ukraine) Sparta
6	RW	Iuliia Manaharova	27 September 1988 (age 37)	1.66 m	57	184	(Ukraine) Sparta
7	LW	Viktoriya Borshchenko	5 January 1986 (age 40)	1.72 m	95	130	(Ukraine) Dniprjanka
9	CB	Rehina Shymkute	21 December 1985 (age 40)	1.76 m	87	182	(Russia) Rostov-on-Don
11	P	Liliia Gorilska	26 February 1988 (age 38)	1.90 m	38	49	(Ukraine) Sparta
12	GK	Iryna Goncharova	19 December 1974 (age 51)	1.80 m	86	0	(Russia) Kirov. St. Petersburg
13	CB	Natalya Turkalo	25 June 1982 (age 44)	1.73 m	3	3	(Ukraine) SK Karpaty Uzhhorod
15	RB	Olga Laiuk	17 May 1984 (age 42)	1.82 m	34	64	(France) Cergy Pontoise HB 95
16	GK	Natalya Parhomenko	21 March 1979 (age 47)	1.80 m	26	5	(Ukraine) Sparta
17	RB	Olha Nikolayenko	5 April 1983 (age 43)	1.78 m	35	149	(Ukraine) HNKC FE
19	P	Valeriia Zoria	23 April 1987 (age 39)	1.80 m	7	12	(Ukraine) Spartak
20	CB	Iuliia Bakhyrieva	23 March 1990 (age 36)	1.75 m	18	49	(Slovakia) Iuventa Michalovce
21	RB	Olha Vashchuk	13 August 1987 (age 39)	1.78 m	82	25	(Hungary) Köfém SC

== Group D ==
=== France ===
Head coach: Olivier Krumbholz

No.	Pos.	Name	Date of birth (age)	Height	App.	Goals	Club
2	P	Amélie Goudjo	19 April 1980 (age 46)	1.73 m	44	66	(France) Issy-les-Moulineaux Handball
4	P	Nina Kamto Njitam	25 June 1983 (age 43)	1.78 m	106	192	(France) Metz HB
5	RB	Camille Ayglon	21 May 1985 (age 41)	1.80 m	83	183	(France) HBC Nîmes
6	CB	Angélique Spincer	25 June 1984 (age 42)	1.74 m	12	146	(France) Issy-les-Moulineaux Handball
7	CB	Allison Pineau	2 May 1989 (age 37)	1.81 m	68	157	(France) Metz HB
8	LB	Claudine Mendy	8 January 1990 (age 36)	1.82 m	26	61	(France) Metz HB
10	CB	Sophie Herbrecht	13 February 1982 (age 44)	1.74 m	165	542	(France) HBC Nîmes
11	LW	Delphine Carrat	24 April 1986 (age 40)	1.60 m	0	0	(France) HBC Nîmes
12	GK	Amandine Leynaud	2 May 1986 (age 40)	1.78 m	77	11	(France) Metz HB
14	RB	Marie-Paule Gnabouyou	4 March 1988 (age 38)	1.85 m	0	0	(France) Toulon St-Cyr Var Handball
15	LB	Stéphanie Ntsama Akoa	24 January 1984 (age 42)	1.84 m	14	4	(France) Le Havre AC Handball
16	GK	Cléopatre Darleux	1 July 1989 (age 37)	1.76 m	39	0	(France) Metz HB
17	LB	Siraba Dembélé	28 June 1986 (age 40)	1.72 m	80	198	(France) Toulon St-Cyr Var Handball
18	RW	Audrey Deroin	6 September 1989 (age 37)	1.74 m	37	46	(France) Toulon St-Cyr Var Handball
22	RW	Katty Piejos	21 August 1983 (age 43)	1.63 m	60	115	(France) Metz HB
24	LB	Mariama Signaté	22 July 1985 (age 41)	1.89 m	77	215	(Denmark) Aalborg DH
64	RB	Alexandra Lacrabère	27 April 1987 (age 39)	1.77 m	49	90	(France) Arvor 29

=== Hungary ===
Head coach: Eszter Mátéfi

No.	Pos.	Name	Date of birth (age)	Height	App.	Goals	Club
6	LW	Orsolya Vérten	22 July 1982 (age 44)	1.70 m	114	339	(Hungary) Győri Audi ETO KC
7	CB	Zita Szucsánszki	22 May 1987 (age 39)	1.73 m	58	177	(Hungary) FTC-Jógazdabank
8	CB	Anikó Kovacsics	29 August 1991 (age 35)	1.75 m	19	36	(Hungary) Győri Audi ETO KC
9	LW	Melinda Vincze	12 November 1983 (age 42)	1.73 m	32	53	(Hungary) Alcoa FKC RightPhone
10	LB	Anita Bulath	20 September 1983 (age 42)	1.80 m	39	109	(Hungary) DVSC-Korvex
11	P	Valéria Szabó	2 March 1983 (age 43)	1.81 m	35	51	(Hungary) DVSC-Korvex
12	GK	Orsolya Herr	23 November 1984 (age 41)	1.76 m	96	0	(Hungary) SYMA Váci NKSE
16	GK	Katalin Pálinger	6 December 1978 (age 47)	1.83 m	244	1	(Hungary) Győri Audi ETO KC
17	LB	Tímea Tóth	16 September 1980 (age 45)	1.82 m	152	486	(Hungary) SYMA Váci NKSE
18	P	Piroska Szamoránsky	9 July 1986 (age 40)	1.71 m	80	184	(Hungary) FTC-Jógazdabank
20	RB	Anett Sopronyi	27 November 1986 (age 39)	1.78 m	17	34	(Hungary) DVSC-Korvex
22	RW	Bernadett Bódi	9 March 1986 (age 40)	1.75 m	53	85	(Hungary) Budapest Bank-Békéscsabai ENKSE
23	LB	Klára Szekeres	1 December 1987 (age 38)	1.86 m	18	8	(Hungary) Budapest Bank-Békéscsabai ENKSE
27	P	Szilvia Ábrahám	1 August 1983 (age 43)	1.75 m	5	3	(Hungary) Veszprém Barabás KC
83	RW	Mónika Kovacsicz	20 November 1983 (age 42)	1.70 m	85	216	(Hungary) FTC-Jógazdabank
86	CB	Bernadett Temes	15 May 1986 (age 40)	1.77 m	16	18	(Hungary) SYMA Váci NKSE
87	RB	Zsuzsanna Tomori	18 June 1987 (age 39)	1.86 m	79	159	(Hungary) FTC-Jógazdabank

=== Norway ===
Head coach: Thorir Hergeirsson

No.	Pos.	Name	Date of birth (age)	Height	App.	Goals	Club
1	GK	Kari Aalvik Grimsbø	4 January 1985 (age 41)	1.80 m	62	0	(Denmark) Esbjerg
2	CB	Mari Molid	8 August 1990 (age 36)	1.72 m	4	11	(Norway) Byåsen
4	RW	Nora Mørk	5 April 1991 (age 35)	1.68 m	5	10	(Norway) Larvik
5	CB	Ida Alstad	13 June 1985 (age 41)	1.72 m	27	68	(Norway) Byåsen
6	P	Heidi Løke	12 December 1982 (age 43)	1.77 m	52	145	(Norway) Larvik
7	RB/W	Tonje Nøstvold	7 May 1985 (age 41)	1.78 m	126	321	(Denmark) Midtjylland
8	RB	Karoline Dyhre Breivang	10 May 1980 (age 46)	1.72 m	204	356	(Norway) Larvik
10	CB	Gro Hammerseng	10 April 1980 (age 46)	1.80 m	155	594	(Norway) Larvik
11	LW	Kari Mette Johansen	11 January 1979 (age 47)	1.72 m	157	412	(Norway) Larvik
13	P	Marit Malm Frafjord	25 November 1985 (age 40)	1.82 m	110	248	(Denmark) Viborg
14	LB	Tonje Larsen	26 January 1975 (age 51)	1.83 m	254	547	(Norway) Larvik
16	GK	Katrine Lunde Haraldsen	30 March 1980 (age 46)	1.81 m	160	3	(Hungary) Győri Audi ETO KC
17	RB	Linn Jørum Sulland	15 July 1984 (age 42)	1.78 m	80	144	(Norway) Larvik
18	RB/W	Linn-Kristin Riegelhuth	1 August 1984 (age 42)	1.76 m	159	627	(Norway) Larvik
19	CB	Stine Bredal Oftedal	25 September 1991 (age 34)	1.78 m	0	0	(Norway) Stabæk
20	LB	Tine Stange	14 May 1986 (age 40)	1.80 m	29	50	(Norway) Larvik
23	LW	Camilla Herrem	8 October 1986 (age 39)	1.66 m	63	173	(Norway) Byåsen

=== Slovenia ===
Head coach: Ivica Rimanić

No.	Pos.	Name	Date of birth (age)	Height	App.	Goals	Club
1	GK	Branka Zec	31 October 1986 (age 39)	1.79 m	36	0	(Slovenia) RK Olimpija
3	LW	Tea Durovič	15 July 1986 (age 40)	1.63 m	0	0	(Slovenia) RK Zagorje
4	LW	Maja Zrnec	31 May 1988 (age 38)	1.65 m	18	69	(Slovenia) RK Krim
6	RB	Ana Gros	21 January 1991 (age 35)	1.86 m	27	56	(Hungary) Győri Audi ETO KC
8	RB	Vesna Puš	1 March 1976 (age 50)	1.76 m	138	120	(Slovenia) RK Olimpija
9	CB	Nina Jeriček	10 April 1984 (age 42)	1.72 m	18	18	(Slovenia) RK Olimpija
11	LB	Špela Okleščen	1 March 1991 (age 35)	1.79 m	0	0	(Slovenia) RK Olimpija
12	GK	Sergeja Stefanišin	19 September 1974 (age 51)	1.84 m	160	0	(Slovenia) RK Krim
13	RB,RW	Nives Ahlin	14 July 1991 (age 35)	1.79 m	0	0	(Slovenia) RK Celje
14	CB	Tamara Mavsar	4 January 1991 (age 35)	1.74 m	12	32	(Slovenia) RK Krim
15	LB	Teja Ferfolja	20 September 1991 (age 34)	1.82 m	0	0	(Slovenia) RK Olimpija
16	GK	Amra Pandžić	20 September 1989 (age 36)	1.77 m	9	0	(France) Cergy Pontoise 95 HB
19	RW	Neli Irman	7 April 1986 (age 40)	1.73 m	49	71	(Slovenia) RK Olimpija
21	CB	Neža Mitruševska	21 July 1986 (age 40)	1.72 m	21	33	(Slovenia) RK Zaječar
22	P	Sanja Gregorc	18 May 1990 (age 36)	1.80 m	0	0	(Slovenia) RK Krim
41	P	Urša Oven	24 September 1986 (age 39)	1.80 m	21	27	(Slovenia) RK Zagorje
