= Ivana Mitrović =

Serbian handball player (born 1993)

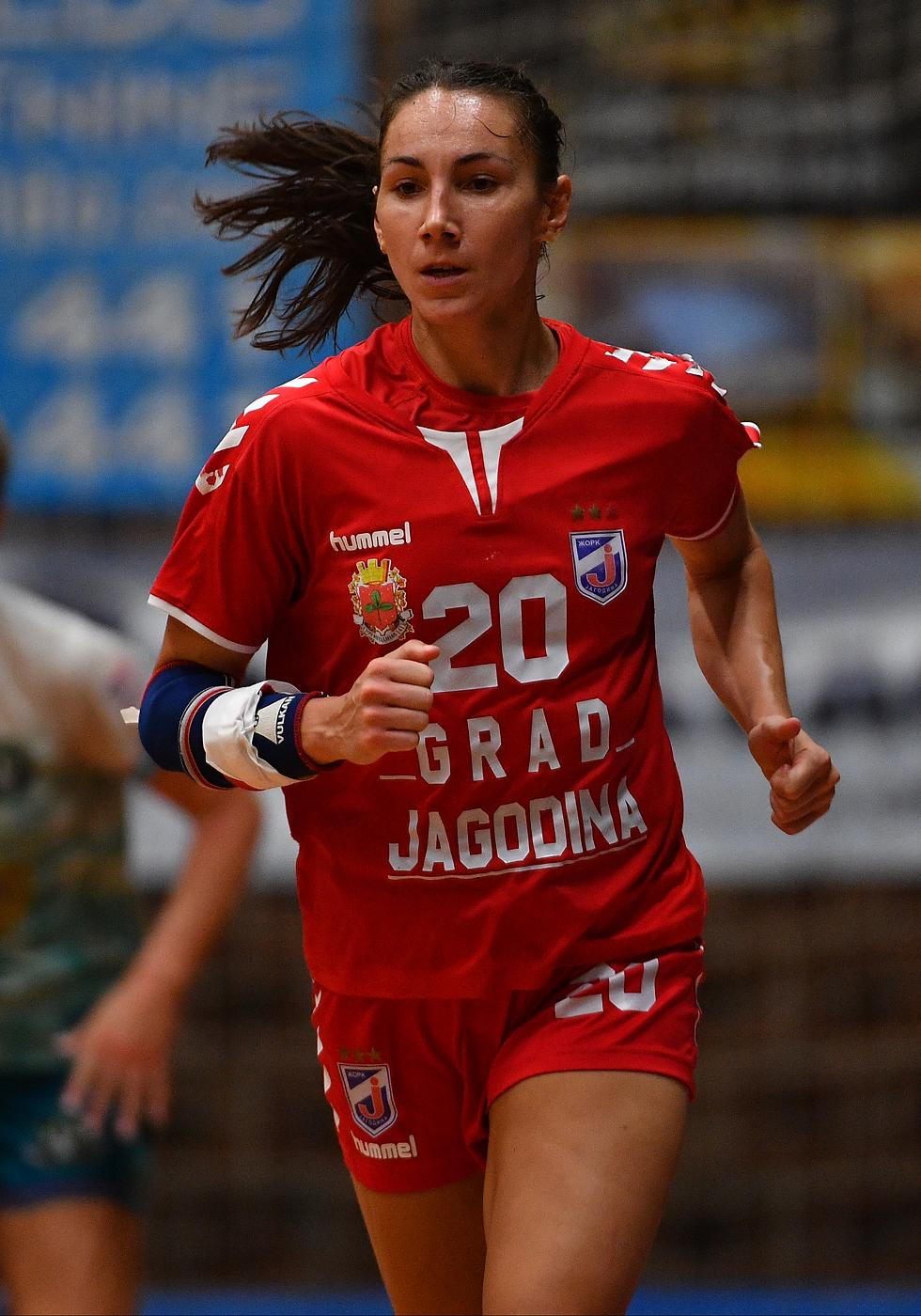

Personal information
- Full name: Ivana Mitrović
- Nationality: Serbian
- Born: 3 February 1993 (age 33) Bor, Serbia
- Height: 1.77 m (5 ft 10 in)

Sport
- Sport: Handball
- Position: Left back / Middle back
- Current club: ŽORK Bor

Senior clubs
- Years: Team
- 2001–2010: ŽORK Bor
- 2010–2017: ŽRK Kikinda
- 2017– 2019: ŽORK Jagodina
- 2019: Szombathelyi KKA
- 2019–2021: Békéscsabai Előre NKSE
- 2021–2022: ŽRK Budućnost Podgorica
- 2022–2023: ŽORK Jagodina
- 2023–2024: Madeira Andebol SAD
- 2024–2025: Kur Baku
- 2025–2026: Hapoel Ashdod
- 2026–: ŽORK Bor
National team
- Years: Team
- 2018-: Serbia

Ivana Mitrović (Serbian Cyrillic: Ивана Митровић; born 3 February 1993) is a Serbian handball player who plays for ŽORK Bor and the Serbia national team

Mitrović played in EHF Women's Champions League, as well as in European Women's Handball Championship and IHF World Women's Handball Championship.

== Achievements ==
- Serbian First League:
  - Winner: 2017/2018, 2018/2019

== Individual awards ==
- Serbian First League Top Scorer: season 2017/2018
- Serbian First League MVP season 2018/2019
