= ŽRK Crvena zvezda =

Serbian female handball club based in Belgrade

- Full name: Ženski rukometni klub Crvena zvezda
- Founded: 1995
- Arena: Sportski Centar "Voždovac"
- Capacity: 1,900
- President: Milan Vujko
- Head Coach: Sandor Rac
- League: ARKUS Liga; WRHL
- 2025–26: 1st
- Club colours
Home	Away

ŽRK Crvena zvezda is a women's handball club from Belgrade, Serbia. Currently, ŽRK Crvena zvezda competes in the Handball League of Serbia (Arkus Liga) and the Women's Regional Handball League. The women's handball team is part of the sports club of SD Crvena zvezda (Red Star Belgrade).

== History ==
Red Star’s women’s handball team first succeeded in 1949 with second place in the Serbian Championship and later became runners-up in Yugoslavia. In the early 1950s, they consistently ranked high and in 1957/58 the team merged into another Belgrade club, Sloboda.

They made their European debut in 2011/12 at the Women's EHF Challenge Cup, later reaching the semifinals of the Serbian Cup and competing again in Europe in 2014/15.

That same season, they were relegated and dissolved, leaving Belgrade without a top-league team. The club was reestablished in December 2016 under the name “ŽRK Crvena zvezda” and re-entered competition in 2017/18. In 2023 they promoted to the ARKUS Liga, claiming their first national trophies by claiming the Serbian Cup and the Serbian Championship in 2024.

Over time, the club has produced several future world stars and national team players, including Dragana Cvijić and Kristina Liščević.

In September 2025, they signed 3 times Olympic Champion and Norwegian legend Katrine Lunde.

== Honours ==
- Serbian League
  - Winners (3): 2023–24, 2024–25, 2025–26
- Serbian Cup
  - Winners (3): 2023–24, 2024–25, 2025–26
- Serbian Super Cup
  - Winners (2): 2025, 2026
- All-Serbian Cup
  - Winners (2): 2024, 2026

== Team ==
=== Current squad ===
Squad for the 2026–27 season

Goalkeepers

- 1 (Serbia) Molli Kubina
- 26 (North Macedonia) Jovana Micevska
- 28 (Serbia) Ana Kačarević

Wingers
RW

- 17 (Serbia) Nataša Lovrić
- 18 (North Macedonia) Elena Gjeorgjievska
- 24 (Serbia) Tijana Simić

LW

- 3 (Serbia) Aleksandra Stamenić
- 23 (Serbia) Isidora Bogunović

Line Players

- 6 (Serbia) Aleksandra Krezović
- 8 (Serbia) Katarina Bojičić
- 72 (Serbia) Jelena Agbaba

Back players
LB

- 5 (Serbia) Milica Momčilović
- 9 (Germany) Naina Klein
- 10 (Serbia) Leposava Glušica
- 33 (Serbia) Teodora Veličković (pregnant)
- 99 (Serbia) Dunja Tabak

CB

- 4 (Serbia) Teodora Majkić
- 7 (Serbia) Nevena Radić
- 91 (Serbia) Una Obrenović

RB

- 14 (Serbia) Aleksandra Vukajlović
- 77 (Serbia) Lara Stanić

=== Transfers ===
Transfers for the 2026–27 season

Joining

- (Serbia) Katarina Bojičić (P) (from (Romania) SCM Craiova)
- (Serbia) Nevena Radić (CB) (from (Serbia) ŽRK Temerin)
- (Serbia) Nataša Lovrić (RW) (from (Serbia) ŽRK Vojvodina)
- (Germany) Naina Klein (LB) (from (Germany) TuS Metzingen)
- (Serbia) Molli Kubina (GK) (free agent)
- (Serbia) Lara Stanić (RB) (from (Croatia) Lokomotiva Zagreb)
- (North Macedonia) Elena Gjeorgjievska (RW) (from (Turkey) Odunpazarı)
- (Serbia) Dunja Tabak (LB) (from (Croatia) Lokomotiva Zagreb)
- (North Macedonia) Jovana Micevska (GK) (from (Romania) CSM Slatina)
- (Serbia) Una Obrenović (CB) (from (Serbia) Ruma)
- (Serbia) Aleksandra Vukajlović (RB) (from (Romania) Slatina)

Leaving

- (Serbia) Sara Garović (RB) (to (Serbia) Bor)
- (Serbia) Jovana Skrobić (LB) (to (Montenegro) Budućnost Podgorica)
- (Serbia) Tamara Kostić (GK) (to (Romania) CSM Târgu Jiu)
- (Serbia) Katarina Mančić (P) (to (Serbia) Bor)

== Notable players ==
- (Socialist Federal Republic of Yugoslavia) Jelena Genčić
- (Serbia) Dragana Cvijić
- (Serbia) Kristina Liščević
- (Serbia) Marija Obradović
- (Serbia) Jovana Milojević
- (Serbia) Marija Čolić
- (Norway) Katrine Lunde
- (Serbia) Jovana Skrobić
- (Serbia) Sara Garović
