= Saša Bošković =

Serbian handball coach (born 1963)

Personal information
- Nationality: Serbian
- Born: 11 June 1963 (age 63) Aranđelovac, SR Serbia, SFR Yugoslavia
- Height: 179 cm (5 ft 10 in)

Sport
- Sport: Handball
- Current club: Serbia

Teams managed
- –: ŽRK Knjaz Miloš
- –: ŽRK Zaječar
- 2011-: Serbia
Medal record
World Championship
Silver medal – second place	2013 Serbia	{{{2}}}

Saša Bošković (born 11 June 1963) is a Serbian handball coach for the Serbian women's national team and the Serbian club ŽRK Zaječar.

== Coaching career ==
With Knjaz Miloš he won the Serbian championship in 2007.

=== National team ===
Bošković took over the Serbia in 2011 after Duško Milić. His first major international tournament was the 2012 European Women's Handball Championship at home. Here he came fourth after losing to Montenegro in the semifinal and Hungary in the third place playoff.

At the 2013 World Women's Handball Championship he led the team to silver medals, losing the final to Brazil.

=== Dismissal ===
In 2016 Bošković was dismissed from his position as a coach by Board of Directors of the Handball Federation of Serbia. This decision followed the team's performance in the 2015 European Women's Handball World Championship where the girls finished in 15th place overall. Notable players on the team such as Andrea Lekić attributed their leanings to Bošković and many other players expressed their depreciation for where he was taking the team.
