= Agbaba =

Agbaba (Serbian Cyrillic: Агбаба) or Ağbaba is a Turkish or Serbian surname. Notable people with the surname include:

- Jelena Agbaba (born 1997), Serbian handball player
- Marija Agbaba (born 1995), Serbian handball player
- Veli Ağbaba (born 1968), Turkish politician
