= Nataša Lovrić =

Serbian handball player (born 2000)

Personal information
- Nationality: Serbian
- Born: 2 October 2000 (age 26) Novi Sad, FR Yugoslavia
- Height: 1.74 m (5 ft 9 in)

Sport
- Sport: Handball
- Position: Right wing
- Current club: ŽORK Jagodina
- Number: 11
National team
Years	Team	Apps	(Gls)
2021–	Serbia	0	(0)

Nataša Lovrić (Serbian Cyrillic: Наташа Ловрић; born 2 October 2000) is a Serbian handball player for ŽORK Jagodina and the Serbian national team.

She represented Serbia at the 2021 World Women's Handball Championship.
