= Ana Kojić =

Serbian handball player (born 1997)

Personal information
- Born: 4 October 1997 (age 29) Brgule, Serbia, FR Yugoslavia
- Height: 1.65 m (5 ft 5 in)

Sport
- Sport: Handball
- Position: Right wing
- Current club: CSM Galati
- Number: 2

Senior clubs
- Years: Team
- –2015: ŽRK Knjaz Miloš
- 2015–2019: Izvor Bukovicka Banja
- 2019–2021: RK Krim
- 2021: Kastamonu
- 2021–2022: Mosonmagyaróvár
- 2022–2023: Siófok KC
National team
Years	Team	Apps	(Gls)
2019-	Serbia	11	(9)

Ana Kojić (Serbian Cyrillic: Ана Којић; born 4 October 1997) is a Serbian handball player for CSM Galati and the Serbian national team.

She represented Serbia at the 2019 World Championship and 2021 World Championship.
