= Marija Laništanin =

Serbian handball player (born 1995)

Personal information
- Nationality: Serbian
- Born: 9 August 1995 (age 31) Kikinda, FR Yugoslavia
- Height: 1.82 m (6 ft 0 in)

Sport
- Sport: Handball
- Position: Right back
- Current club: Békéscsabai Előre NKSE
- Number: 80

Senior clubs
- Years: Team
- 2016–2017: Siófok KC
- 2017–2018: HC Gomel
- 2018–2019: Békéscsabai Előre NKSE
- 2019–2020: ŽORK Jagodina
- 2020–2021: Szombathelyi KKA
- 2021–2022: Vasas SC
- 2022–: Békéscsabai Előre NKSE
National team
Years	Team	Apps	(Gls)
2019–	Serbia	8	(3)

Marija Laništanin (Serbian Cyrillic: Марија Лаништанин; née Agbaba (Агбаба); born 9 August 1995) is a Serbian handball player for Békéscsabai Előre NKSE and the Serbian national team.

She represented Serbia at the 2021 World Women's Handball Championship.

Her younger sister Jelena Agbaba currently plays for Moyra-Budaörs Handball.
