= Aleksandra Vukajlović =

Serbian handball player (born 1997)

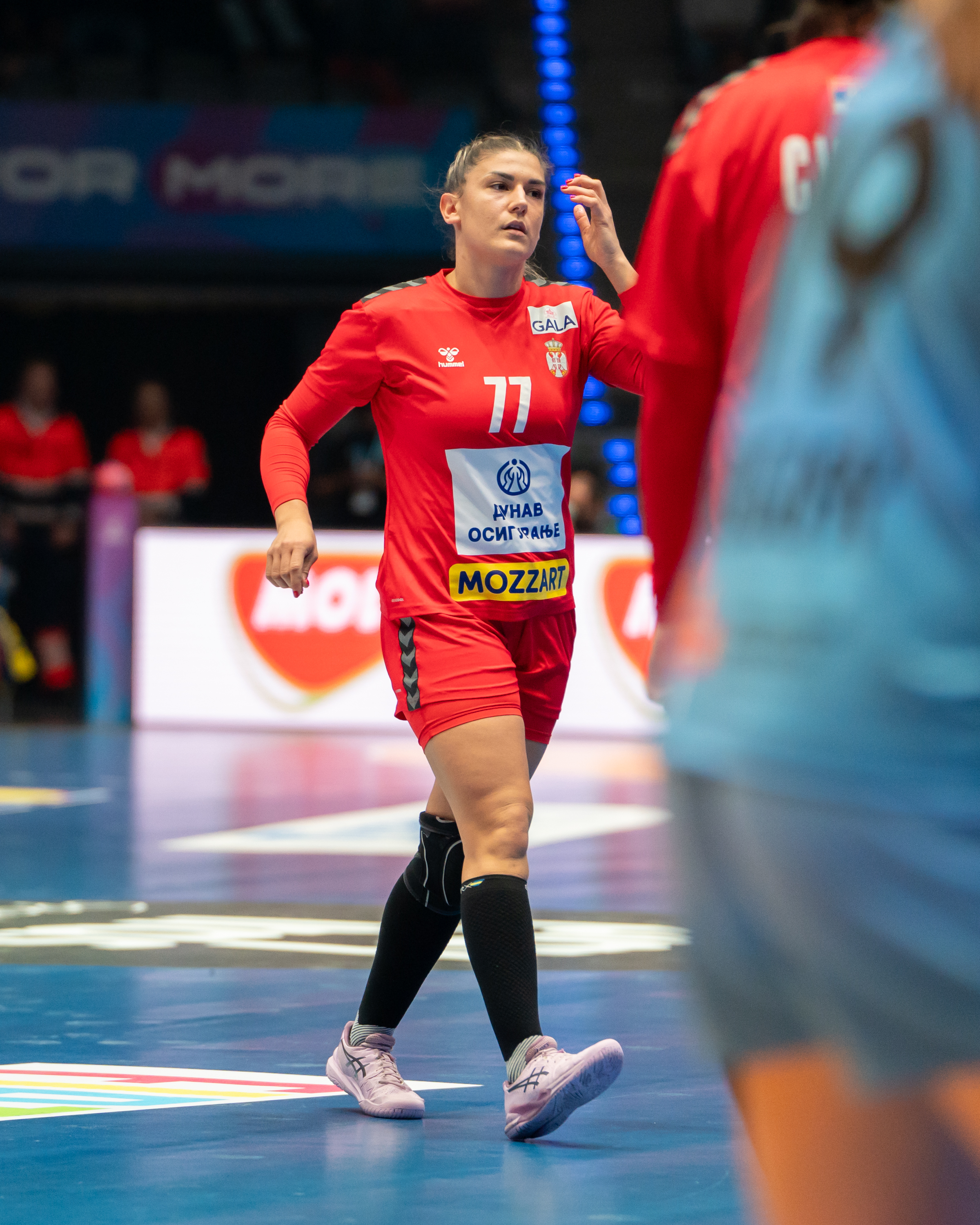

Personal information
- Nationality: Serbian
- Born: 7 June 1997 (age 29) Čačak, Serbia
- Height: 1.70 m (5 ft 7 in)

Sport
- Sport: Handball
- Position: Right back
- Current club: ŽRK Crvena Zvezda
- Number: 7

Senior clubs
- Years: Team
- –2016: ŽORK Jagodina
- 2016–2020: Békéscsabai ENKSE
- 2020–2021: Debreceni VSC
- 2021–2022: Érd HC (on loan)
- 2022–2025: CS Minaur Baia Mare
- 2025–2026: CSM Slatina
- 2026-: ŽRK Crvena Zvezda
National team
| Years | Team | Apps | (Gls) |
| 2018– | Serbia | 53 | (78) |
Medal record
Mediterranean Games
| Bronze medal – third place | 2022 Oran | Team |
- Updated on 28 December 2025

Aleksandra Vukajlović (Serbian Cyrillic: Александра Вукајловић; born 7 June 1997) is a Serbian handball player for ŽRK Crvena Zvezda and the Serbian national team.
