= Tatjana Medved =

Serbian handball player (born 1974)

Personal information
- Full name: Tatjana Medved
- Nationality: Serbian
- Born: 13 March 1974 (age 52) Novi Sad, SR Serbia, SFR Yugoslavia

Sport
- Sport: Handball
- Position: Left Back
- Number: 31

Senior clubs
- Years: Team
- 1997–1999: Kometal Gjorče Petrov Skopje
- 1999–2003: Milar L'Eliana
- 2003-2004: Metz
- 2004-2005: BM Sagunto
- 2005-2008: Cem. la Union-Ribarroja
- 2008-2009: SK Århus
- 2009-2010: ŽRK Zaječar
National team
- Years: Team
- –: Serbia
Medal record
Women's Handball
Representing FR Yugoslavia
World Championships
Bronze medal – third place	2001 Italy	Team competition
Representing Serbia and Montenegro
Mediterranean Games
Silver medal – second place	2005 Almería	Team

Tatjana Medved (née Popov; born 13 March 1974) is a Serbian former handball player. She was captain of the Serbian national team. She has been a member of the National Assembly of Serbia since 2022, as a member of the Together We Can Do Everything parliamentary group.

== Achievements ==
Kometal Gjorče Petrov Skopje

- Macedonian League (2)
- Macedonian Cup (2)
- EHF Women's Champions League: Quarterfinalist

Milar L'Eliana

- ABF League (3)
- Copa de la Reina (1)
- Copas de la Liga ABF (3)
- Super Copas de le Liga ABF (3)
- EHF Women's Champions League: Runner-up 2002/03

Metz

- Campeon de la Liga (1)

BM Sagunto

- ABF League (1)

Cem. la Union-Ribarroja

- ABF League (2)
- Copa de la Reina (1)
- Super Copa de le Liga ABF (1)

ŽRK Zaječar

- Superliga (1)

== Individual awards ==
- 2005 Mediterranean Games - Top goalscorer
