= Sanja Vujović =

Serbian handball player (born 1987)

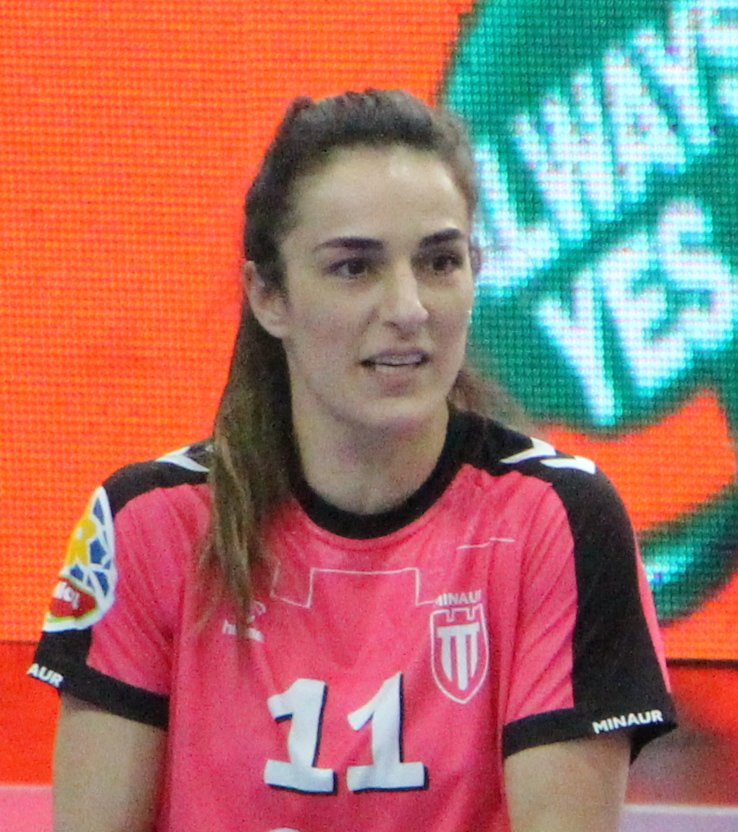

Personal information
- Nationality: Serbian
- Born: 25 May 1987 (age 39) Belgrade, SFR Yugoslavia
- Height: 1.81 m (5 ft 11 in)

Sport
- Sport: Handball
- Position: Left back

Senior clubs
- Years: Team
- –2007: ŽRK Radnički Belgrade
- 2007–2008: HC Naisa Niš
- 2008–2009: RK Krim
- 2009–2011: RK Zaječar
- 2011–2013: RK Podravka Koprivnica
- 2013–2015: Viborg HK
- 2015–2017: HC Vardar
- 2017–2018: Siófok KC
- 2019–2020: ŽRK Budućnost
- 2022–2024: CS Minaur Baia Mare
National team
Years	Team	Apps	(Gls)
2006–2017	Serbia	111	(140)
Medal record
World Championship
Silver medal – second place	2013 Serbia

Sanja Vujović (née Damnjanović; born 25 May 1987) is a retired Serbian female handball player.

== Achievements ==
- Slovenian Championship:
  - Winner: 2009
- Slovenian Cup:
  - Winner: 2009
- Serbian Championship:
  - Winner: 2010, 2011
- Serbian Cup:
  - Winner: 2010, 2011
- Croatian Championship:
  - Winner: 2012, 2013
- Croatian Cup:
  - Winner: 2012, 2013
- Danish Championship:
  - Winner: 2014
- Danish Cup:
  - Winner: 2014
- EHF Cup Winners' Cup:
  - Winner: 2014
- World Championship:
  - Silver Medalist: 2013
- European Championship:
  - Fourth place: 2012

== Individual awards ==
- All-Star Left Back of the European Championship: 2012
- All-Star Left Back of the World Championship: 2013
