= ŽRK Zaječar =

Serbian handball team

RK Zaječar
- Full name: Rukometni klub Zaječar
- Founded: 1949; 77 years ago
- Arena: SRC Kraljevica
- Capacity: 2360
- League: Regional League East

Ženski rukometni klub Zaječar (Serbian Cyrillic: Женски рукометни клуб Зајечар, English: Women's handball club Zaječar) is a women's handball club from Zaječar, Serbia. They won four titles in Serbian National Championships for period from 2010 to 2013. Now, they compete in the minor league.

== Achievements ==
- National Championships :
  - Winners (4) : 2009–10, 2010–11, 2011–12, 2012-13
- National Cups :
  - Winners (4) : 2009–10, 2010–11, 2011–12, 2012-13
- EHF Women's Cup Winners' Cup :
  - Quarterfinalist (1) : 2011-12

== Notable players ==
- (Serbia) Sanja Damnjanović
- (Serbia) Jelena Erić
- (Serbia) Katarina Krpež
- (Serbia) Tatjana Medved
- (Serbia) Jelena Nišavić
- (Serbia) Jelena Popović
- (Serbia) Sanja Rajović
- (Serbia) Dijana Števin
- (Serbia) Katarina Tomašević
- (Serbia) Jelena Živković
- (Croatia) Martina Pavić
- (Croatia) Aneta Peraica
- (Croatia) Maja Zebić
- (Hungary) Anett Sopronyi
- (North Macedonia) Natalija Todorovska
- (Romania) Tereza Pîslaru
- (Slovenia) Barbara Varlec
- (Spain) Marta Mangué
- (Spain) Jessica Alonso
- (Spain) Begoña Fernández
- (Spain) Nuria Benzal
- (Ukraine) Liliia Gorilska
