= Leposava =

Leposava is a Serbian female given name, derived from Slavic lepota, meaning "beauty". It may refer to:

- Leposava Glušica (born 1982), Serbian handballer
- Leposava Milićević, retired Serbian politician

== See also ==
- Leposavić, town in Kosovo
