= Jasmina Janković =

Dutch handball player (born 1986)

Jasmina Jankovic
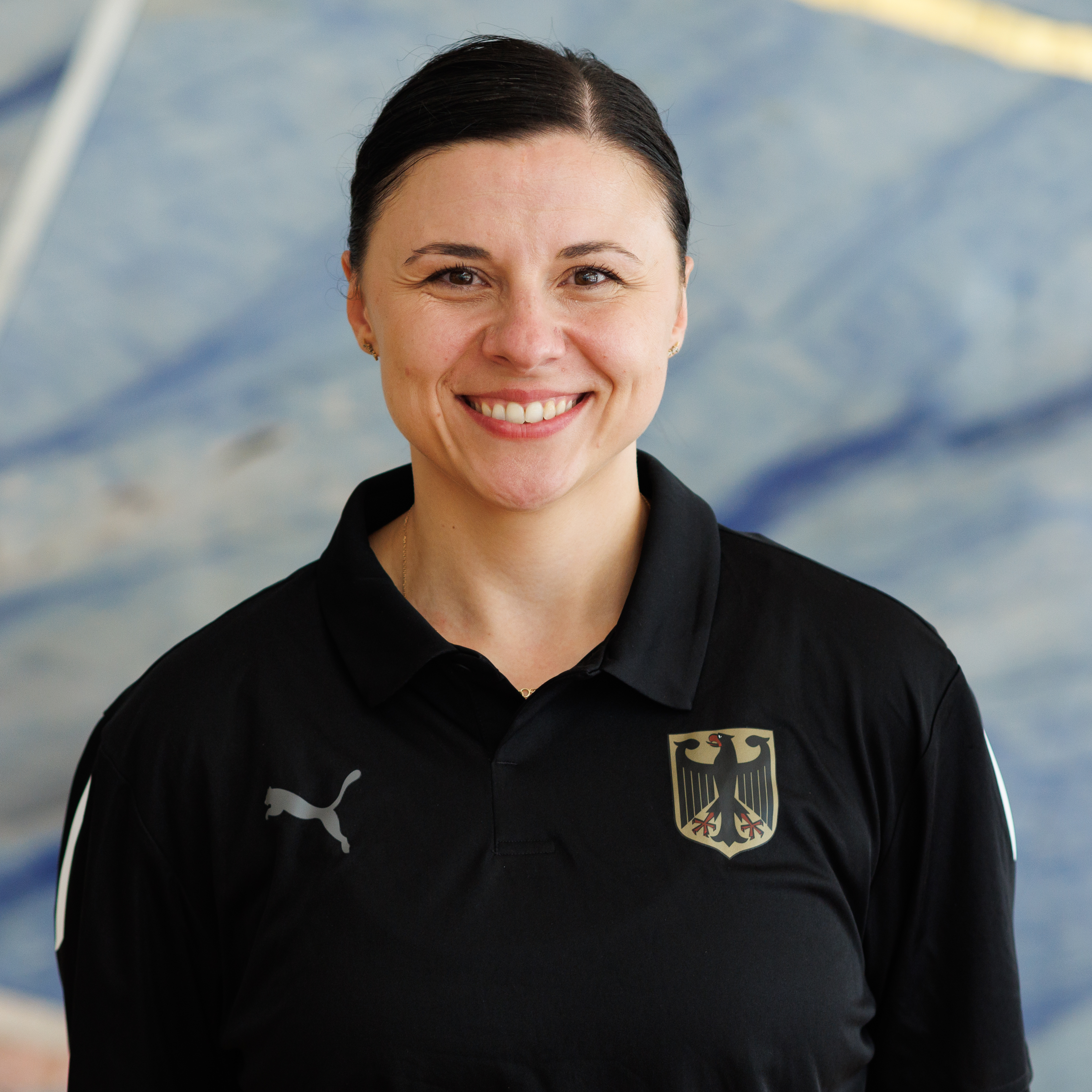

Personal information
- Nationality: Dutch
- Born: 6 December 1986 (age 39) Doboj, SR Bosnia and Herzegovina, SFR Yugoslavia
- Height: 1.68 m (5 ft 6 in)

Sport
- Sport: Handball
- Position: Goalkeeper
- Current club: Germany (GK coach)

Youth career
- Years: Team
- –2002: HV Ventura
- 2002–2004: HV Hellas
- 2004–2005: GOG

Senior clubs
- Years: Team
- 2005–2008: V&L
- 2008–2009: Odense Håndbold
- 2009–2010: SVG Celle
- 2010–2011: Buxtehuder SV
- 2011–2014: Frisch Auf Göppingen
- 2014–2018: TuS Metzingen
- 2018–2019: Toulon Saint-Cyr Var Handball
- 2019–2021: Frisch Auf Göppingen
National team
Years	Team	Apps	(Gls)
2004–2021	Netherlands	87	(4)

Teams managed
- 2022–2023: Netherlands (GK coach)
- 2023–: Germany (GK coach)
Medal record
World Championship
Bronze medal – third place	2017 Germany
European Championship
Silver medal – second place	2016 Sweden

Jasmina Jankovic (born 6 December 1986) is a Dutch handball player of Bosnian origin, who played for the Dutch national team.

She represented the Netherlands at the 2013 World Women's Handball Championship in Serbia. In 2016 she represented the Netherlands at the 2016 Olympics in Rio de Janeiro
