= Slađana Pop-Lazić =

Serbian handball player (born 1988)

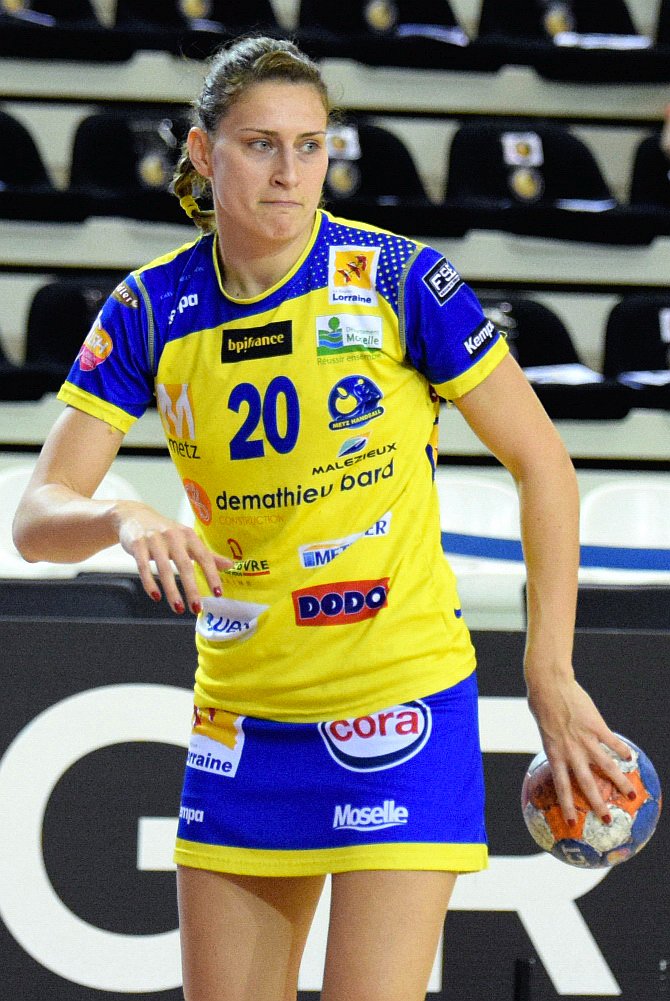

Personal information
- Nationality: Serbian
- Born: 26 July 1988 (age 38) Belgrade, SR Serbia, SFR Yugoslavia
- Height: 1.78 m (5 ft 10 in)

Sport
- Sport: Handball
- Position: Pivot
- Current club: Brest Bretagne Handball
- Number: 20

Senior clubs
- Years: Team
- –2009: HC Naisa Niš
- 2009–2012: ŽRK Zaječar
- 2012–2015: ESBF Besançon
- 2015–2017: Metz Handball
- 2017–2022: Brest Bretagne Handball
National team
Years	Team	Apps	(Gls)
2010–2021	Serbia	100	(300)

Slađana Pop-Lazić (Serbian Cyrillic: Слађана Поп-Лазић; born 26 July 1988) is a Serbian handball player for Brest Bretagne Handball. She played for the Serbian national team.

== Individual awards ==
- French Championship Best Pivot: 2016
