= 2018 Carpathian Trophy =

Tournament details
- Host country: Romania
- Venue(s): 1 (in 1 host city)
- Dates: 23–24 November
- Teams: 4 (from 1 confederation)

Final positions
- Champions: Romania
- Runners-up: Romania B
- Third place: Russia
- Fourth place: Serbia

Tournament statistics
- Matches played: 4
- Goals scored: 226 (56.5 per match)
- Top scorer(s): Jelena Lavko (11 goals)

Awards
- Best player: Cristina Neagu

The 2018 Carpathian Trophy was the 50th edition of the Carpathian Trophy held in Bucharest, Romania between 23 and 24 November as a women's friendly handball tournament organised by the Romanian Handball Federation.

The most recent Olympic champions, Russia, appeared in the competition.

It was televised by TVR1 and TVR HD.

== Knockout stage ==
All times are local (UTC+02:00).

=== Bracket ===
Semifinals
23 November
Romania B | 25
Russia | 24
23 November
Romania | 29
Serbia | 26

Final
24 November
Romania B | 24
Romania | 33
Third place
24 November
Russia | 33
Serbia | 32

=== Semifinals ===
| 23 November 2018; 16:00 | Romania B | 25–24 | Russia | Sala Polivalentă, Bucharest; Referees: Nițișor, Stamatoiu (ROU) |
| 23 November 2018; 16:00 | Popa 6 | (11–12) | Maslova 4 | Sala Polivalentă, Bucharest; Referees: Nițișor, Stamatoiu (ROU) |
| 23 November 2018; 16:00 | 3× (yellow card) 3× (suspension) | Report | 1× (yellow card) 4× (suspension) | Sala Polivalentă, Bucharest; Referees: Nițișor, Stamatoiu (ROU) |

| 23 November 2018; 18:30 | Romania | 29–26 | Serbia | Sala Polivalentă, Bucharest; Referees: Florescu, Stoia (ROU) |
| 23 November 2018; 18:30 | Neagu, Pintea 5 | (13–15) | Krpež Slezak 6 | Sala Polivalentă, Bucharest; Referees: Florescu, Stoia (ROU) |
| 23 November 2018; 18:30 | | Report | 1× (yellow card) 1× (suspension) | Sala Polivalentă, Bucharest; Referees: Florescu, Stoia (ROU) |

=== Third place game ===
| 24 November 2018; 16:00 | Russia | 33–32 | Serbia | Sala Polivalentă, Bucharest; Referees: Barbu, Manafu (ROU) |
| 24 November 2018; 16:00 | Samokhina 7 | (13–15) | Lavko 7 | Sala Polivalentă, Bucharest; Referees: Barbu, Manafu (ROU) |
| 24 November 2018; 16:00 | 3× (yellow card) 4× (suspension) | Report | 1× (yellow card) 5× (suspension) 1× (red card) | Sala Polivalentă, Bucharest; Referees: Barbu, Manafu (ROU) |

=== Final ===
| 24 November 2018; 18:30 | Romania B | 24–33 | Romania | Sala Polivalentă, Bucharest; Referees: Din, Dinu (ROU) |
| 24 November 2018; 18:30 | Zamfirescu 5 | (12–21) | Laslo 5 | Sala Polivalentă, Bucharest; Referees: Din, Dinu (ROU) |
| 24 November 2018; 18:30 | 3× (yellow card) 1× (suspension) | Report | 2× (yellow card) | Sala Polivalentă, Bucharest; Referees: Din, Dinu (ROU) |

== Awards ==
- Most Valuable Player: Cristina Neagu (ROU)
- Best Defender: Crina Pintea (ROU)
- Best Goalkeeper: Anna Sedoykina (RUS)
- Top Scorer: Jelena Lavko (SRB)
