= Women's Regional Handball League =

Handball league in Southeast Europe

- Sport: Handball
- Founded: 2026; 0 years ago
- No. of teams: 10
- Country: Croatia; North Macedonia; Serbia; Montenegro; Slovenia

The Women's Regional Handball League, or simply the WHRL League, is a regional women's club handball league in Southeast Europe, featuring teams from Croatia, Montenegro, North Macedonia, Serbia and Slovenia.

== History of the league ==
Raising the quality, visibility and commercial value of regional handball through a joint, non-profit competition of three federations, in coordination with the EHF. The league is formed on this principles on 20 May 2026 in Podgorica, Montenegro.

== Competition ==
=== Competition system ===
In the first season 2026/27 there are two groups. Group A with four and Group B with six teams. Teams in the same group will play all against one another twice, once at home, once away. After that four best teams from each group will advance to Quarterfinals. Winners of these matches will qualify for Final Four.

=== Current clubs ===
Location of teams in the 2026–27 season

The following 10 clubs are competing in the 2026–27 Women's Regional Handball League:

Country	Team	City
Croatia	Lokomotiva	Zagreb
Croatia	Podravka	Koprivnica
Montenegro	Stars-Lavice	Cetinje
North Macedonia	Čair	Skopje
North Macedonia	Gjorche Petrov	Skopje
Serbia	Bor	Bor
Serbia	Crvena zvezda	Belgrade
Serbia	Jagodina	Jagodina
Serbia	Naisa	Niš
Slovenia	Krim	Ljubljana

In 2026/27 season, Group A contains Crvena zvezda, Krim, Lokomotiva, Podravka, while Group B contains Bor, Čair, Gjorche Petrov, Jagodina, Naisa and Stars-Lavice.
