= Jelena Popović =

Serbian handball player (born 1984)

Personal information
- Nationality: Serbian
- Born: 9 April 1984 (age 42) Karlovac, SFR Yugoslavia
- Height: 1.71 m (5 ft 7 in)

Sport
- Sport: Handball
- Position: Right back
- Current club: Nantes Handball
- Number: 5
National team
| Years | Team | Apps | (Gls) |
| – | Serbia | 112 | (182) |
Medal record
Representing Serbia
World Championship
| Silver medal – second place | 2013 Serbia | Team |
Representing Serbia and Montenegro
Mediterranean Games
| Silver medal – second place | 2005 Almería | Team |

Jelena Popović (born 4 September 1984) is a Serbian handballer who plays for the French club Nantes Handball and the Serbian national team.

== Club career ==
Jelena played for the RK Medicinar Šabac, HC Naisa Niš, Kometal Gjorče Petrov Skopje, ŽRK Zaječar, ES Besançon and currently she is a member of the French team Nantes Handball.

== National team ==
Popović represented Serbia and Montenegro at the 2005 Mediterranean Games and won a silver medal. She played for the Serbian national team at the 2012 European Handball Championship when the team finished 4th.
