= Leposava Glušica =

Serbian handballer (born 1982)

Personal information
- Full name: Leposava Glušica
- Nationality: Serbian
- Born: 9 July 1982 (age 44) Ruma, Serbia
- Height: 1.86 m (6 ft 1 in)

Sport
- Sport: Handball
- Position: Left Back
- Current club: ŽRK Crvena zvezda
- Number: 10

Senior clubs
- Years: Team
- –: ORK Beograd
- –: ŽRK Crvena Zvezda
- 2007–2009: Békéscsabai ENKSE
- 2009–2010: Kiskunhalas NKSE
- 2010–2017: Békéscsabai ENKSE
- 2017–2018: RK Zaječar
- 2018–: ŽRK Crvena zvezda

Leposava Glušica (born 9 July 1982) is a Serbian handballer who plays for ŽRK Crvena zvezda. She joined the East Hungarian team of Békéscsabai ENKSE on a one-year contract in 2010 and became a free agent in the summer of 2011, however, not much later she re-joined the purple-whites on a short-term deal. She played for the club until the summer of 2017.
