= SRC Kraljevica =

- Location: Zaječar, Serbia
- Owner: SRC Kraljevica
- Capacity: 2,360

Construction
- Opened: 1976

Tenants
- ŽRK Zaječar, RK Zaječar

SRC Kraljevica is an indoor sporting arena located in Zaječar, Serbia. The capacity of the arena is 2,360 people. It is currently home to the ŽRK Zaječar handball team.

== See also ==
- List of indoor arenas in Serbia
- Zaječar
