= Jovana Skrobić =

Serbian handball player (born 1996)

Jovana Kovačević
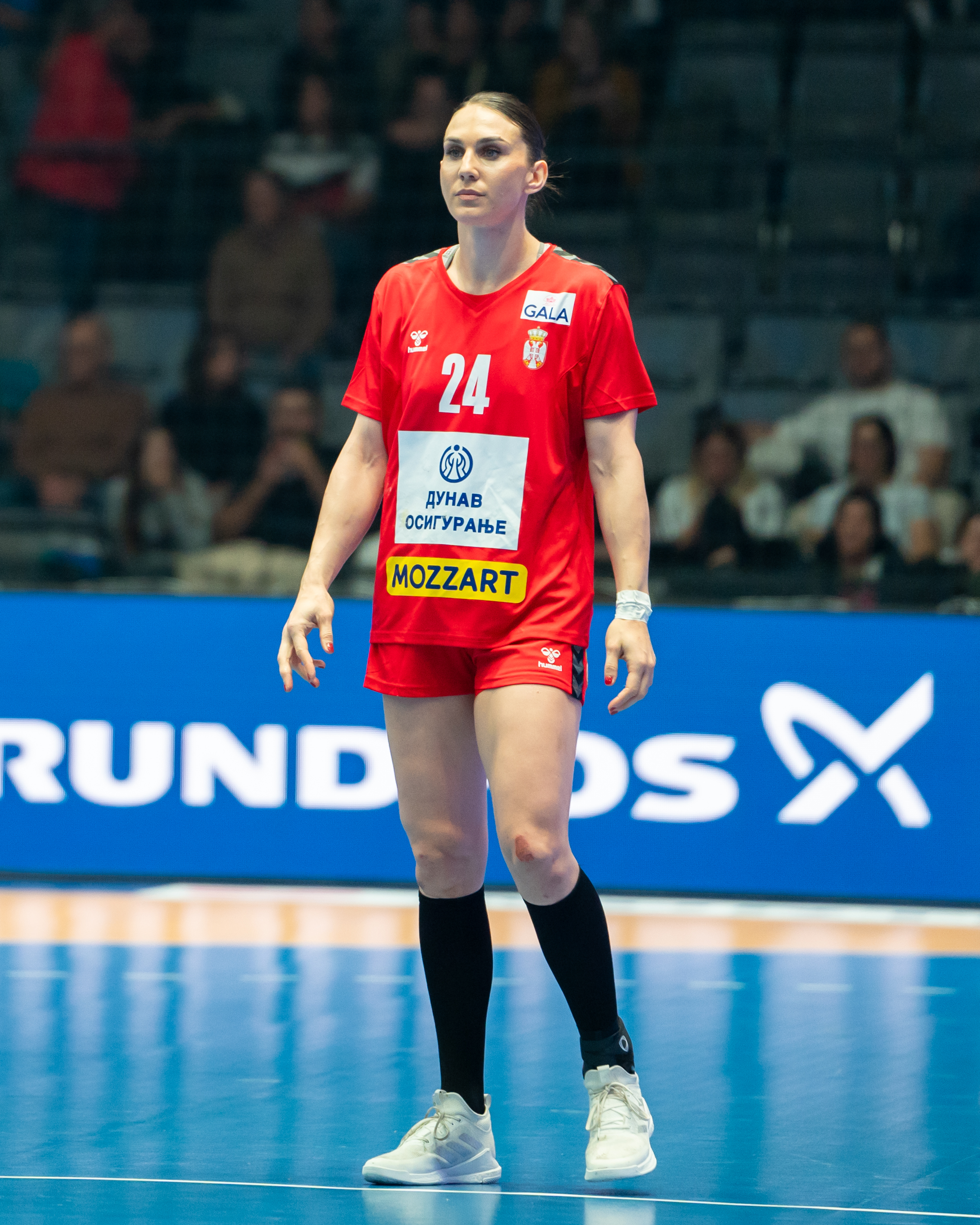

Personal information
- Nationality: Serbian
- Born: 9 April 1996 (age 30) Belgrade, FR Yugoslavia
- Height: 1.82 m (6 ft 0 in)

Sport
- Sport: Handball
- Position: Left back
- Current club: ŽRK Crvena Zvezda
- Number: 24

Youth career
- Years: Team
- –: ŽRK Zemun
- -2015: RK Junior

Senior clubs
- Years: Team
- 2015-2016: ŽRK Budućnost Podgorica
- 2016-2018: Békéscsabai Előre NKSE
- 2018-2020: Érd HC
- 2020-2021: Minaur Baia Mare
- 2021-2022: CS Gloria 2018 Bistrița-Năsăud
- 2022-2025: SCM Râmnicu Vâlcea
- 2025-: ŽRK Crvena Zvezda
National team
Years	Team	Apps	(Gls)
2015-	Serbia	38	(129)
- Updated on 5 November 2025

Jovana Skrobić (born Kovacević; Serbian Cyrillic: Јована Ковачевић; born 9 April 1996) is a Serbian handball player for ŽRK Crvena Zvezda and the Serbian national team.

== Career ==
Skrobić started playing handball at age 14 after first practicing Aikidō. She started at ŽRK Zemun and later joined RK Junior.

In the summer of 2015 she joined Montenigrin club ŽRK Budućnost Podgorica. Here she won the Montenegrin championship and cup in 2016. She also reaching the final four of the EHF Champions League with the club.

In 2016 she joined Hungarian side Békéscsabai Előre NKSE. Two years later she joined league rivals Érd HC.

In 2020 she joined Romanian side Minaur Baia Mare. In 2021 she joined league rivals CS Gloria 2018 Bistrița-Năsăud for a single season, before joining SCM Râmnicu Vâlcea.

== Individual awards ==
- Top Scorer of the Romanian League: 2021
