= Dragica Đurić =

Serbian handball player (born 1963)

Personal information
- Nationality: Serbian
- Born: 11 June 1963 (age 63) Šabac, SR Serbia, SFR Yugoslavia
- Height: 179 cm (70 in)

Sport
- Sport: Handball
- Position: Goalkeeper

Senior clubs
- Years: Team
- 198_-198_: Radnički Belgrade
- 198_-1989: Voždovac Belgrade
- 1989-199_: TV Lützellinden
- 1997-2000: Kometal Skopje
- 2001-2003: ŽRK Budućnost
- 2002-2003: Hypo Niederösterreich
- 2004-2006: GC Amicitia Zürich

Teams managed
- –: Serbia (goalkeeping coach
- 2016-2017: Serbia
Medal record
Women's handball
Women's Summer Olympics
Gold medal – first place	1984 Los Angeles	Team
Women's World Championship
Silver medal – second place	1990 South Korea	Team
Women's Mediterranean Games
Gold medal – first place	1991 Athens	Team

Dragica Đurić, (former Krstić, Serbian Cyrillic: Драгица Ђурић; born 26 March 1963 in Šabac, SFR Yugoslavia) is a Serbian-Yugoslav handball player and coach.

Đurić was a member of the Yugoslavia national team which won the gold medal at the 1984 Summer Olympics (she played one match). Four years later, she played all five matches at the 1988 Summer Olympics where she and her teammates finished fourth. She also has been appointed as best goalkeeper at the 1990 World Championship in South Korea where Yugoslavia has been runners-up. She later played for the FR Yugoslavia national team.

At club level, she played for Radnički Belgrade in the 1980s, Voždovac Belgrade until 1989 or German topclub TV Lützellinden. Later, she played for Kometal Skopje, ŽRK Budućnost, Hypo Niederösterreich and GC Amicitia Zürich

She was head coach of the Serbia women's national team from February 2016 to 2017. Before that, she was the coach of the goalkeepers in the national team, and the manager of the Serbia women's national team. Here she led the team at the 2016 European Championship. Prior to being the head coach, she was the goalkeeping coach on the team.
