= Sanja Dabevska =

Macedonian female handballer

Personal information
- Nationality: Macedonian
- Born: 4 March 1996 (age 30) Gostivar, Macedonia
- Height: 1.85 m (6 ft 1 in)

Sport
- Sport: Handball
- Position: Line player
- Current club: Bor
- Number: 33

Senior clubs
- Years: Team
- 2014-2017: ŽRK Metalurg
- 2017-2019: ŽRK Kumanovo
- 2019-2020: OF Nea Ionia
- 2020-2021: Dunaújvárosi Kohász KA
- 2022-2023: RK Lokomotiva Zagreb
- 2023-2025: Slobozia Unirea
- 2025-: Bor
National team
Years	Team	Apps	(Gls)
2020–	North Macedonia	11	(16)

Sanja Dabevska (born 4 March 1996) is a Macedonian female handballer for Bor and the North Macedonia national team.

She represented the North Macedonia at the 2022 European Women's Handball Championship.
