= Jelena Agbaba =

Serbian handball player (born 1997)

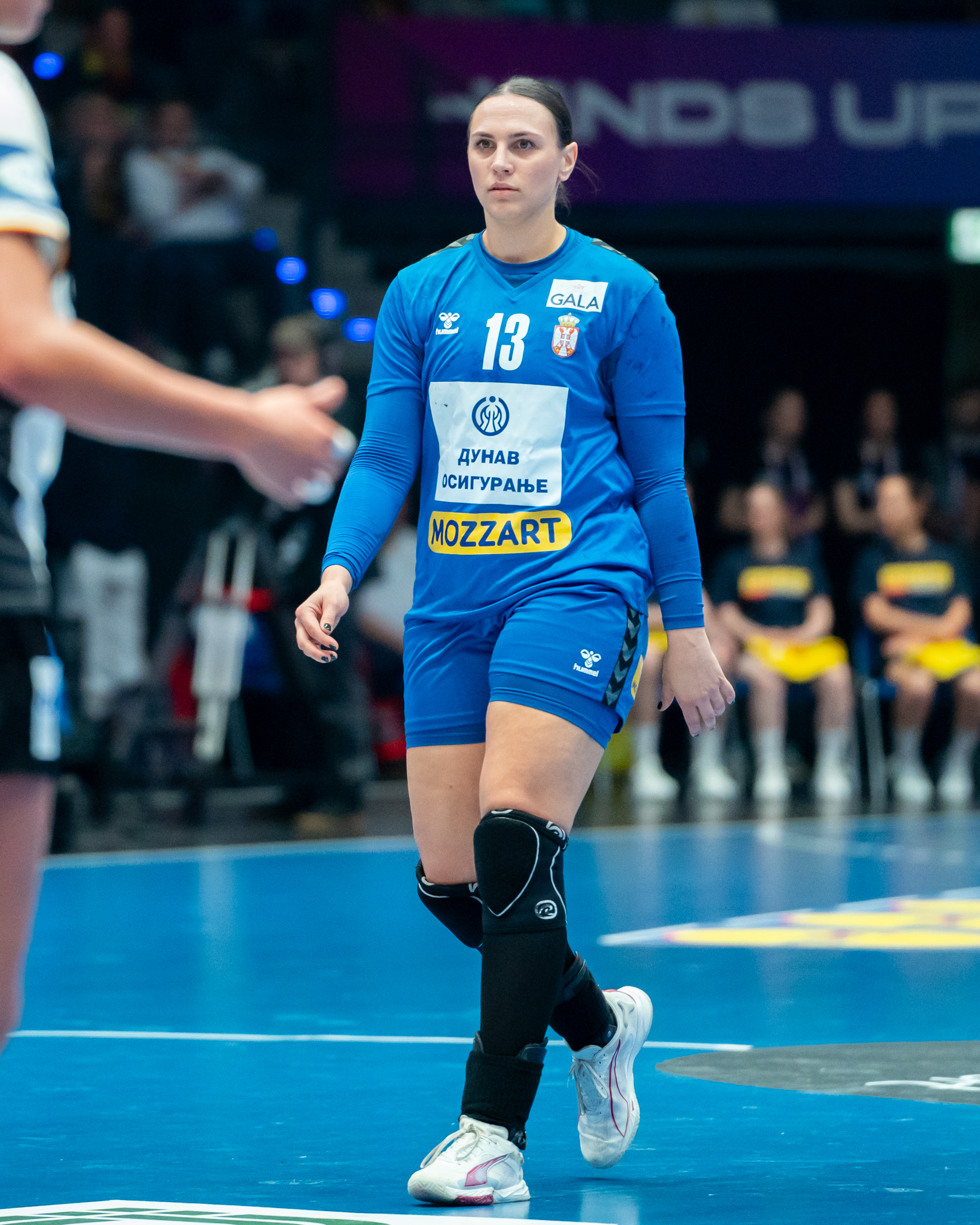
- Agbaba in 2025

Personal information
- Nationality: Serbian
- Born: 29 June 1997 (age 29) Kikinda, FR Yugoslavia
- Height: 1.81 m (5 ft 11 in)

Sport
- Sport: Handball
- Position: Pivot
- Current club: ŽRK Crvena Zvezda
- Number: 72

Senior clubs
- Years: Team
- 2016–2017: Siófok KC
- 2017–2018: HC Gomel
- 2018–2019: Pogoń Szczecin
- 2019–2021: Békéscsabai Előre NKSE
- 2021–2022: Moyra-Budaörs Handball
- 2022–2024: career stopped
- 2024–2025: ŽRK Železničar Inđija
- 2025–: ŽRK Crvena Zvezda
National team
Years	Team	Apps	(Gls)
2018–	Serbia	34	(43)
- Updated on 5 November 2025

Jelena Agbaba (Serbian Cyrillic: Јелена Агбаба; born 29 June 1997) is a Serbian handball player for ŽRK Crvena Zvezda and the Serbian national team.

She represented Serbia at the 2020 European Championship.

Her older sister Marija Laništanin (née Agbaba) is also an international handball player.
