= Women's Serbian Handball Cup =

- Founded: 2006
- Country: Serbia
- Confederation: EHF
- Most recent champion: Crvena zvezda
- Most titles: Jagodina (5 title)
- Broadcasters: Arena Sport, RTS

The Women's Serbian Handball Cup is an annual tournament for Serbian women's handball clubs organized by the Serbian Handball Federation. It is founded in 2006.

== List of champions ==
Season	Venue	Champion	Runners-up	Score
2025–26	Belgrade	ŽRK Crvena zvezda	Bor	31–28
2024–25	Kraljevo	ŽRK Crvena zvezda	Jagodina	40–29
2023–24	Inđija	ŽRK Crvena zvezda	Železničar Inđija	28–28 pen.:5-3
2022–23	Jagodina-Aranđelovac	Jagodina	Bekament	47–45 (22:18, 25:27)
2021–22	Kraljevo	Jagodina	Medicinar	25–19
2020–21	Smederevo	Jagodina	Naisa	22–21

== See also ==
- Serbian Handball Cup
