= Vesna Milanović-Litre =

Croatian handball player (born 1986)

Personal information
- Nationality: Croatian
- Born: 30 May 1986 (age 40) Sinj, SR Croatia, SFR Yugoslavia
- Height: 1.80 m (5 ft 11 in)

Sport
- Sport: Handball
- Position: Pivot
- Number: 23

Senior clubs
- Years: Team
- –: Sinj
- –: Split Kaltenberg
- –2010: RK Lokomotiva Zagreb
- 2010–2014: RK Podravka Koprivnica
- 2014–2015: Győri ETO KC
- 2015–2017: RK Krim Ljubljana
- 2017–2020: Kisvárdai KC
National team
Years	Team	Apps	(Gls)
–	Croatia	104	(196)

Vesna Milanović-Litre (born 30 May 1986) is a retired Croatian handball player who played for Kisvárdai KC last time and the Croatian national team.

After winning many Croatian championship and Croatian cup trophies in past seasons, Vesna Milanović-Litre started season 2011–12. After performing well in various preparation tournaments, she was elected in Dream-team as the best line-player of the tournament in Metković, where Podravka played against Slovenian champions RK Krim, Montenegrin champions ŽRK Budućnost Podgorica, Serbian champions RK Zaječar and Macedonian champions ŽRK Metalurg.

== Achievements ==
- Women's Regional Handball League
  - Runner-up: 2010–11
- Croatian Championship
  - Winner: 2003–04, 2010–11
  - Runner-up: 2001–02, 2002–03, 2004–05, 2005–06, 2006–07, 2007–08, 2008–09, 2009–10
- Croatian Cup
  - Winner: 2004–05, 2006–07, 2010–11
  - Runner-up: 2001–02, 2002–03, 2003–04, 2005–06, 2007–08, 2008–09, 2009–10
