= Ana Kačarević =

Serbian handball player (born 1984)

Personal information
- Nationality: Serbian
- Born: 18 July 1984 (age 42) Kladovo, Serbia
- Height: 1.75 m (5 ft 9 in)

Sport
- Sport: Handball
- Position: Goalkeeper
- Current club: ŽRK Aranđelovac
- Number: 1
National team
Years	Team	Apps	(Gls)
–	Serbia	33	(1)
Medal record
Mediterranean Games
Gold medal – first place	2013 Mersin	Team

Ana Kačarević (born 18 June 1984) is a Serbian handballer player for ŽRK Aranđelovac and the Serbian national team.
