= Jelena Erić (handballer) =

Serbian handball player (born 1979)

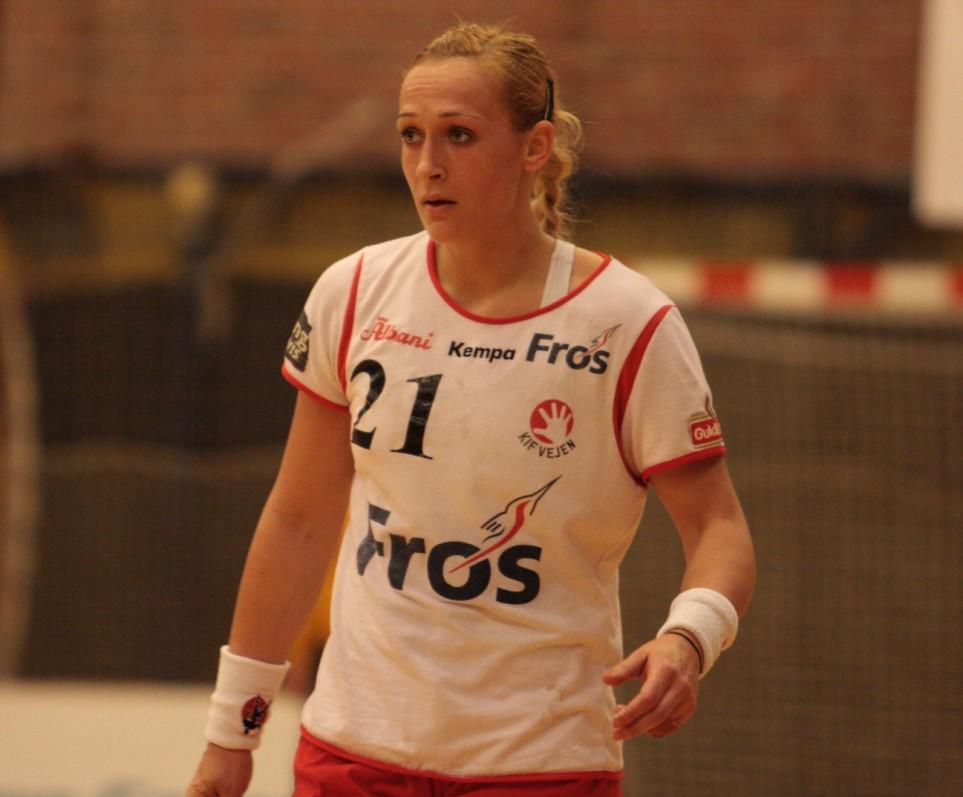

Personal information
- Nationality: Serbian
- Born: 12 October 1979 (age 47) Novi Sad, SFR Yugoslavia
- Height: 1.80 m (5 ft 11 in)

Sport
- Sport: Handball
- Position: Left back

Senior clubs
- Years: Team
- 1999–2003: ŽRK Radnički Belgrade
- 2003–2005: ŽRK Knjaz Miloš
- 2005-2009: KIF Kolding
- 2009-2011: Randers HK
- 2011-2012: ŽRK Zaječar
- 2012-2014: HC Astrakhanochka
National team
| Years | Team | Apps | (Gls) |
| – | Serbia | 92 | (271) |
Medal record
Women's Handball
Representing Serbia
World Championship
| Silver medal – second place | 2013 Serbia | Team competition |
Representing Serbia and Montenegro
Mediterranean Games
| Silver medal – second place | 2005 Almería | Team |

Jelena Erić (born October 12, 1979) is a retired Serbian handball player. She was a member of the Serbian national team.
