= Jovana Micevska =

Macedonian female handballer (born 2000)

Personal information
- Nationality: Macedonian
- Born: 26 July 2000 (age 26) Skopje, Macedonia
- Height: 1.76 m (5 ft 9 in)

Sport
- Sport: Handball
- Position: Goalkeeper
- Current club: ŽRK Crvena zvezda
- Number: 26

Youth career
- Years: Team
- 2016–2017: ŽRK Vardar

Senior clubs
- Years: Team
- 2017–2018: ŽRK Vardar
- 2018–2023: OGC Nice Côte d'Azur Handball
- 2023–2025: CSM Slatina
National team
Years	Team	Apps	(Gls)
2018–	North Macedonia	22	(0)

Jovana Micevska (born 26 July 2000) is a Macedonian female handballer for ŽRK Crvena zvezda and the North Macedonia national team.

She represented the North Macedonia at the 2022 European Women's Handball Championship and 2024 European Women's Handball Championship .
