= Aleksandra Stamenić =

Serbian handball player (born 1998)

Personal information
- Nationality: Serbian
- Born: 12 June 1998 (age 28) Novi Sad, FR Yugoslavia
- Height: 1.75 m (5 ft 9 in)

Sport
- Sport: Handball
- Position: Left wing
- Current club: ŽRK Crvena Zvezda
- Number: 11
National team
Years	Team	Apps	(Gls)
2021–	Serbia	33	(56)
- Updated on 26 October 2025

Aleksandra Stamenić (Serbian Cyrillic: Александра Стаменић; born 12 June 1998) is a Serbian handball player for ŽRK Crvena Zvezda and the Serbian national team.

She represented Serbia at the 2021 World Women's Handball Championship.
