= Jovana Milojević =

Serbian handball player (born 1992)

Personal information
- Nationality: Serbian
- Born: 24 July 1992 (age 34) Sremska Mitrovica, Serbia
- Height: 1.73 m (5 ft 8 in)

Sport
- Sport: Handball
- Position: Pivot
- Current club: PAOK Thessaloniki
- Number: 92
National team
Years	Team	Apps	(Gls)
–	Serbia	17	(27)

Jovana Milojević (Serbian Cyrillic: Јована Милојевић; born 24 July 1992) is a Serbian handball player for PAOK Thessaloniki and the Serbian national team.

She represented Serbia at the 2020 European Women's Handball Championship.
