= Jelena Lavko =

Serbian handball player (born 1991)

Jelena Zivkovic
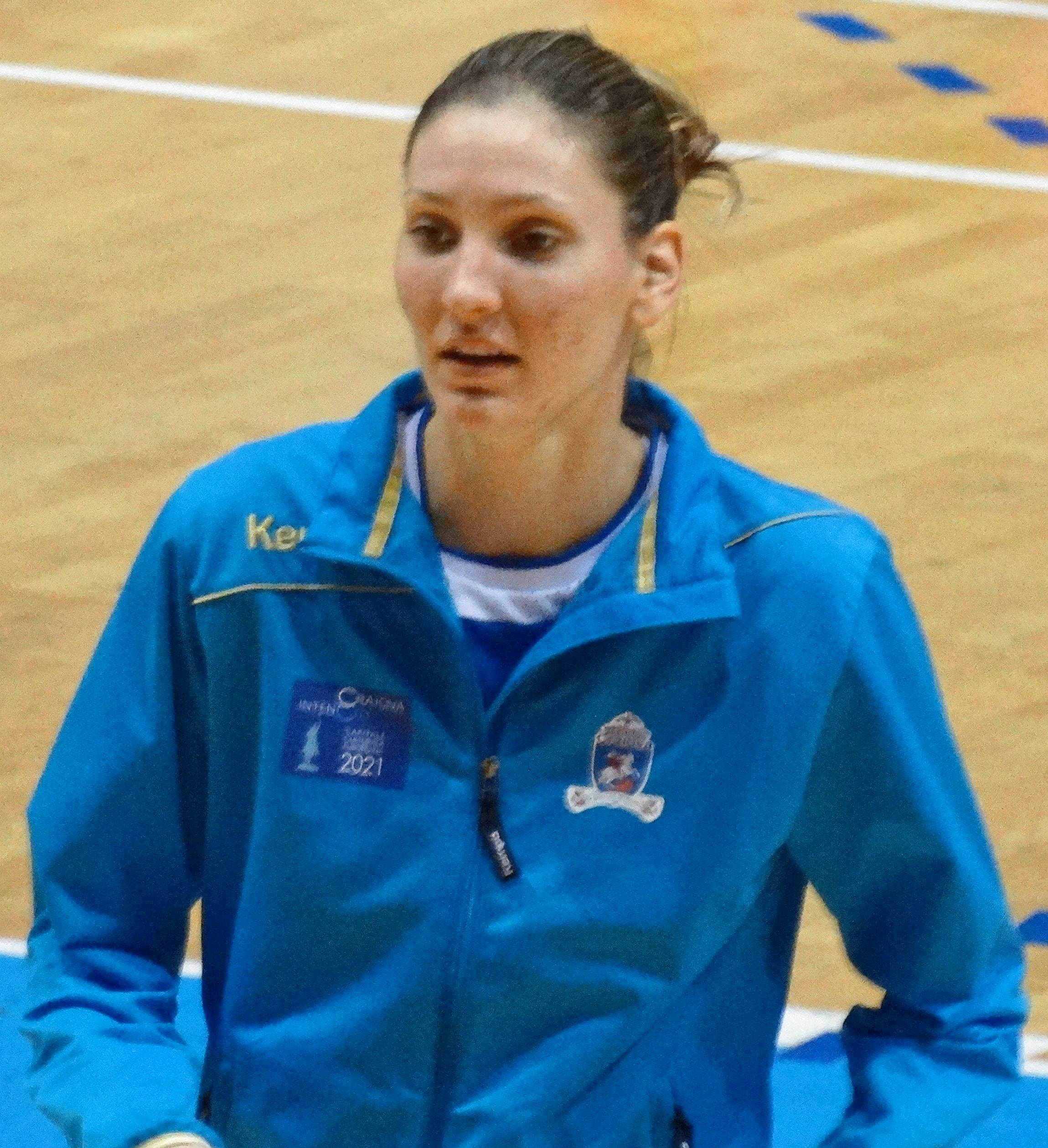

Personal information
- Nationality: Serbian
- Born: 6 July 1991 (age 35) Zrenjanin, SR Serbia, SFR Yugoslavia
- Height: 1.82 m (6 ft 0 in)

Sport
- Sport: Handball
- Position: Right back

Senior clubs
- Years: Team
- –2010: ŽRK Kikinda
- 2010–2011: ŽRK Zaječar
- 2011–2012: Ferencvárosi TC
- 2012–2013: ŽRK Budućnost Podgorica
- 2013–2015: RK Podravka Koprivnica
- 2015–2016: SCM Craiova
- 2016–2018: Alba Fehérvár KC
- 2018–2020: Érd NK
- 2020–2022: Minaur Baia Mare
- 2022–2024: Dunărea Brăila
National team
Years	Team	Apps	(Gls)
2009–2023	Serbia	117	(259)
Medal record
World Championship
Silver medal – second place	2013 Serbia
Mediterranean Games
Gold medal – first place	2013 Mersin	Team

Jelena Lavko (née Živković; born 6 July 1991) is a Serbian handball player.

She was also capped several times for the Serbian national team and participated at the 2010 European Championship and 2013 World Championship.

== Achievements ==
- 2013 World Championship:
  - Runner-up: 2013
- Serbian Championship:
  - Winner: 2011
- Serbian Cup:
  - Winner: 2011
- Nemzeti Bajnokság I:
  - Runner-up: 2012
- EHF Cup Winners' Cup:
  - Winner: 2012

== Individual awards ==
- Carpathian Trophy Top Scorer: 2018
