= Kristina Liščević =

Serbian handball player (born 1989)

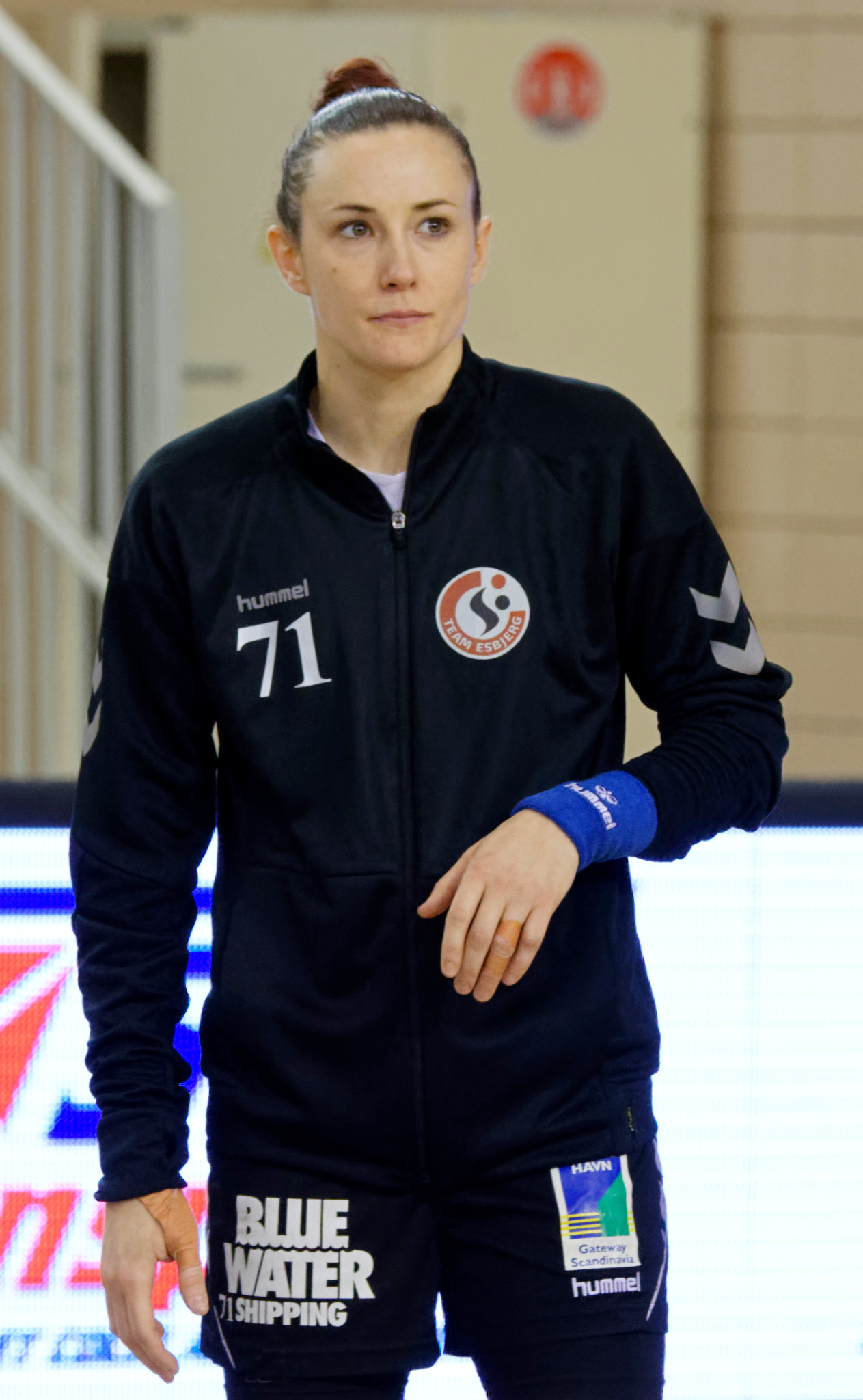
- Kristina Liščević in 2018

Personal information
- Nationality: Serbian
- Born: 20 October 1989 (age 37) Sombor, SR Serbia, SFR Yugoslavia
- Height: 1.73 m (5 ft 8 in)

Sport
- Sport: Handball
- Position: Centre back
- Current club: HC Dunărea Brăila
- Number: 71

Senior clubs
- Years: Team
- –2009: ZRK Sombor
- 2009–2010: ŽRK Crvena Zvezda
- 2010–2012: ŽRK Metalurg
- 2012–2015: Metz Handball
- 2015–2016: Váci NKSE
- 2016: HC Astrakhanochka
- 2016–2017: HC Kuban Krasnodar
- 2017: Kisvárdai KC
- 2017–2019: Team Esbjerg
- 2019–2022: SCM Râmnicu Vâlcea
- 2022–2025: HC Dunărea Brăila
National team
Years	Team	Apps	(Gls)
2011–2023	Serbia	107	(262)
Medal record
World Championship
Silver medal – second place	2013 Serbia

Kristina Liščević (Serbian Cyrillic: Кристина Лишчевић; born 20 October 1989) is a former Serbian handballer for HC Dunărea Brăila and formerly the Serbian national team.

== International honours ==
- EHF Cup:
  - Finalist: 2013
- World Championship:
  - Silver Medalist: 2013

== Individual awards ==
- Carpathian Trophy Most Valuable Player: 2011
- EHF Champions League Best Hope: 2012
- Championnat de France Best Playmaker: 2013
- Liga Națională Best Foreign Player: 2020, 2021
- All-Star Playmaker of the Liga Națională: 2021

== Personal life ==
She is a sister of Zlatko Liščević.
