= Frisch Auf Göppingen (women's handball) =

Frisch Auf Frauen
- Full name: Thop.iwent-Frisch Auf Göppingen-Sport-Dienstleistungs GmbH
- Short name: FAG, FA Frauen
- Founded: 1923; 103 years ago
- Arena: EWS Arena
- Capacity: 5,600
- President: Claus Mai
- Head coach: Nico Kiener
- League: Handball-Bundesliga
- 2024–25: 8th
- Club colours
Home	Away

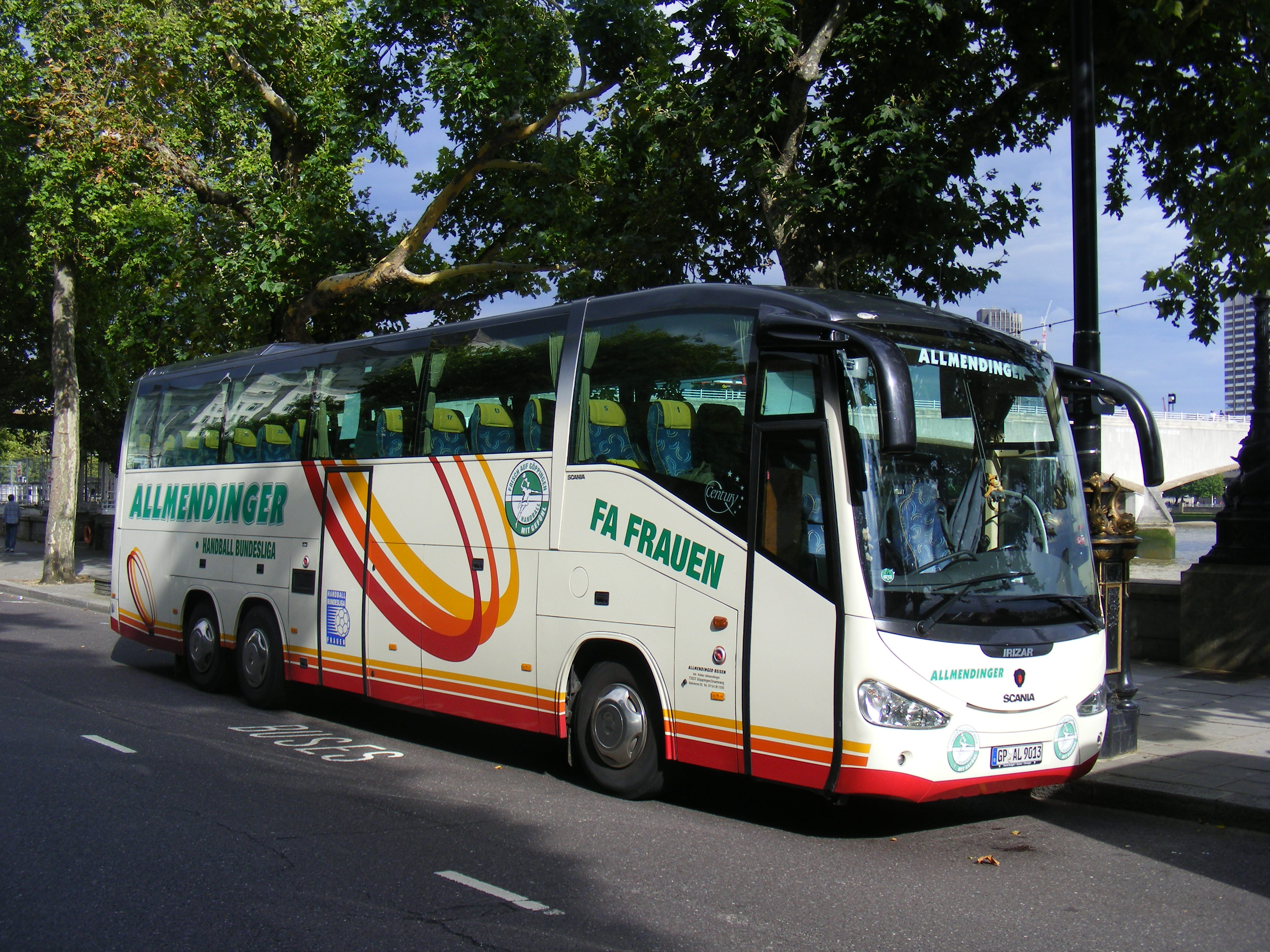
Frisch Auf Frauen teambus 2011

TPSG Frisch Auf Göppingen Frauen is German women's handball club. The sports club itself was founded in 1896 as the Göppingen Gymnastics Club. In October 1920, the club established its own handball division. The women's section was established in 1923. The team played for the first time in 2006 in the Handball-Bundesliga. The team made it to the finals of the Challenge Cup in 2010.

== Crest, colours, supporters ==
=== Kit manufacturers ===
Period	Kit manufacturer
–2017	(Germany) Kempa
2017–2020	(Japan) Mizuno
2020–present	(Spain) Joma

=== Kits ===
HOME
2012–14	2015–17	2020–21	2021–

AWAY
2012–14	2014–15	2015–17	2020–21	2021–

THIRD
2012–14	2020–21

== Team ==
=== Current squad ===
Squad for the 2025–26 season

Frisch Auf Göppingen

Goalkeepers

- 1 (Germany) Barbara Fürst
- 61 (Germany) Celina Meißner
- 72 (Hungary) Petra Hlogyik

Left wingers

- 7 (Germany) Lea Watzl
- 27 (Germany) Anna Ehmann

Right wingers

- 9 (Germany) Gianina Bianco
- 24 (Germany) Luisa Scherer

Line players

- 13 (Germany) Aylin Bornhard
- 33 (Germany) Luisa Schulze
- 20 (Germany) Louisa de Bellis

Left backs

- 16 (Netherlands) Mariel Stefanie Beugels
- 32 (Japan) Haruno Sasaki

Centre backs

- 22 (Germany) Sina Ehmann
- 26 (Germany) Leonie Patorra
- 63 (Germany) Stephanie Elies
- 81 (Germany) Lea Neubrander

Right backs

- 5 (Germany) Ann Kynast
- 23 (Germany) Nicola Merz
- 95 (Germany) Lara Däuble

=== Technical staff ===
- Head coach: (Germany) Nico Kiener

=== Transfers ===
Transfers for the 2026–27 season

Joining

- (Brazil) Mikaela Sobrinho Possatti (GK) from (Serbia) Bor

Leaving

== EHF ranking ==
As of 24 February 2022

Rank	Team	Points
232	(Greece) Anagennisi Artas	5
233	(Azerbaijan) HC Azersu	5
234	(Germany) Frisch Auf Göppingen	5
235	(Romania) Dacia Mioveni	5
236	(Turkey) Cankaya BLD Anka SK	5
237	(Turkey) Polatli Belediyespor	4
238	(Slovenia) ŽRK Celje	4

== Former club members ==
=== Notable former players ===
- (Germany) (Austria) Melanie Herrmann (2014–2015)
- (Germany) Selina Kalmbach (2022–)
- (Germany) Jenny Karolius (2011–2014)
- (Germany) Maria Kiedrowski (2011–2014)
- (Germany) Alexandra Meisl (2007–2010)
- (Germany) Ania Rösler (2014–2015)
- (Germany) Maike Weiss (2000–2005)
- (Austria) Beate Scheffknecht (2011–2015)
- (Austria) Johanna Schindler (2016–2020)
- (Austria) Klara Schlegel (2021–)
- (Czech Republic) Petra Adámková (2016–2020)
- (Czech Republic) Šárka Frančíková (2020–)
- (Czech Republic) Michaela Hrbková (2016–2021)
- (Czech Republic) Alena Unger (2006–2014)
- (Hungary) Edit Lengyel (2015–2022)
- (Lithuania) Birutė Stellbrink (2009–2014)
- (Luxembourg) Tina Welter (2019–2021)
- (Netherlands) Jasmina Janković (2011–2014, 2019–2021)
- (Netherlands) Wendy Smits (2008–2009)
- (Netherlands) Maxime Struijs (2015–2018)
- (Netherlands) Anouk van de Wiel (2014–2015)
- (Netherlands) Marieke van der Wal (2010)
- (Slovenia) Lina Krhlikar (2015–)
- (Slovenia) Branka Zec (2018–2020)
- (Slovenia) Maja Zrnec (2015–2016)
- (Switzerland) Nicole Dinkel (2009–2015)
- (Switzerland) Lisa Frey (2020–)
- (Switzerland) Seline Ineichen (2014–2015)
- (Switzerland) Romy Morf-Bachmann (2019–2021)
- (Switzerland) Karin Weigelt (2010–2014, 2017–2018)
- (Switzerland) Pascale Wyder (2020–)

=== Former coaches ===
Seasons	Coach	Country
2009–2013	Aleksandar Knežević	(Serbia)
2013	Nedeljko Vujinović	(Germany)
2013–2014	Vasile Oprea	(Romania)
20014–2021	Aleksandar Knežević	(Serbia)
2021–	Nico Kiener	(Germany)
