= Ingeborg Roelofs =

Dutch handball player (born 1983)

Personal information
- Nationality: Dutch
- Born: 27 November 1983 (age 42) Breukelen, Netherlands
- Height: 178 cm (70 in)

Sport
- Sport: Handball
- Position: Goalkeeper

Senior clubs
- Years: Team
- 2004-2013: Westfriesland-SEW
National team
Years	Team	Apps	(Gls)
–	Netherlands	44	(0)

Ingeborg Roelofs (born 27 November 1983, in Breukelen) is a Dutch team handball player. She plays on the Dutch national team, and participated at the 2011 World Women's Handball Championship in Brazil.
