= Maryna Vlasenko =

Ukrainian handball player

Personal information
- Nationality: Ukrainian
- Born: 6 October 1987 (age 39)
- Height: 1.82 m (6 ft 0 in)

Sport
- Sport: Handball
- Position: Goalkeeper
- Current club: HC Astrakhanochka
- Number: 16
National team
Years	Team	Apps	(Gls)
–	Ukraine	11	(0)
- Updated on 4 December 2012

Maryna Vlasenko (born 6 October 1987) is a Ukrainian handballer player for HC Astrakhanochka and the Ukrainian national team. She has also played for HC Motor Zaporizhzhia, Zaporozhye-ZSEA and Vistal Laczpol Gdynia.
