= Martina Pavić =

Croatian handball player (born 1988)

Personal information
- Full name: Martina Pavić
- Nationality: Croat
- Born: 27 October 1988 (age 37) Zagreb, SR Croatia, SFR Yugoslavia
- Height: 1.78 m (5 ft 10 in)

Sport
- Sport: Handball
- Position: Line Player
- Current club: Kastamonu Bld. GSK
- Number: 7

Senior clubs
- Years: Team
- –: ŽRK Tvin
- –: RK Trešnjevka
- –: RK Zaječar
- 2012–2015: Muratpaşa Bld. SK
- 2015-: Kastamonu Bld. SK
National team
- Years: Team
- –: Croatia

Martina Pavić (born 27 October 1988) is a Croatian handballer who plays for Kastamonu Bld. GSK and the Croatian women's national team.

== International honours ==
- EHF Cup Winners' Cup:
  - Quarterfinals: 2012
