= ŽORK Bor =

Serbian women's handball club

- Full name: Ženski Omladinski Rukometni Klub Bor
- Short name: Bor
- Arena: USC "Bobana Momčilović Veličković
- Capacity: 4,500 (3000 + 1500)
- Head Coach: Zoran Barbulović
- League: Handball League of Serbia; WHRL
- 2025-26: 4th
- Club colours
Home	Away

ŽORK Bor is a women's handball club from Bor, Serbia. Currently, Bor competes in the Handball League of Serbia, WHRL and the Women's EHF European Cup.

== European record ==
Season	Competition	Round	Club	Home	Away	Aggregate
2017–18	EHF Challenge Cup	R2	(Bosnia and Herzegovina) ŽRK Krivaja Zavidovići	30–19	39–25	69–44
2017–18	EHF Challenge Cup	R3	(Portugal) AC Alavarium / Love Tiles	26–26	26–29	52–55
2025–26	EHF Women's European Cup	R2	(Israel) Maccabi Arazim Ramat Gan	32–26	24–21	56–47
2025–26	EHF Women's European Cup	R3	(Slovakia) HK Slovan Duslo Šaľa	32–28 (4–3)	31–35	67–66
2025–26	EHF Women's European Cup	Last 16	(Spain) Málaga	17–22	21–24	38–46
2026–27	EHF Women's European Cup	R2	(Bosnia and Herzegovina) ŽRK Krivaja Zavidovići	38–26	39–27	77–53
2026–27	EHF Women's European Cup	R3	(Belgium) Sint-Truiden	38–22	34–27	72–49
2026–27	EHF Women's European Cup	Last 16	(Turkey) Yalıkavak Spor			

== Honours ==
- Serbian Cup
  - Runners-up (1): 2025-26
- Serbian Super Cup
  - Runners-up (1): 2026

== Current squad ==
Squad for the 2026–27 season

Goalkeepers

- 1 (Belarus) Palina Kukharchyk
- 12 (Serbia) Teodora Stojilković
- 16 (Serbia) Tijana Ilić
- 27 (Serbia) Gordana Petković

Players

- 3 (Serbia) Sabina Šerifi
- 4 (Serbia) Nevena Simonović
- 5 (Serbia) Sara Radović
- 6 (Serbia) Anja Lilić
- 8 (Serbia) Jana Stanković
- 9 (Japan) Kotomi Kita
- 10 (Serbia) Jovana Savić
- 11 (Serbia) Mia Nedeljković
- 13 (Serbia) Mina Petrović
- 14 (Serbia) Katarina Mančić
- 19 (Serbia) Aleksandra Vasić
- 20 (Serbia) Ivana Mitrović
- 26 (Serbia) Nikolina Bulatović
- 84 (Russia) Anastasia Alekseeva
- 88 (Serbia) Tamara Kojić
- 94 (Serbia) Sara Garović

=== Transfers ===
Transfers for the 2026–27 season

Joining

- (Serbia) Gordana Petković (GK) from (Serbia) Napredak
- (Serbia) Ivana Mitrović (LB) from (Israel) Hapoel Ashdod
- (Serbia) Sara Garović (RB) from (Serbia) Crvena zvezda
- (Russia) Anastasia Alekseeva (RW) from (Russia) Rostov-Don
- (Serbia) Tamara Kojić (P) from (Serbia) Loznica
- (Serbia) Aleksandra Vasić (LB) from (Montenegro) Budućnost Podgorica
- (Angola) Leopoldina Cristóvão (P) from (Israel) Hapoel Ashdod
- (Belarus) Palina Kukharchyk (GK) from (Slovakia) DAC Dunajská Streda
- (Serbia) Katarina Mančić (P) from (Serbia) Crvena zvezda
- (Japan) Kotomi Kita (RB) from (Serbia) Bekament

Leaving

- (Brazil) Mikaela Sobrinho Possatti (GK) to (Germany) Frisch Auf Göppingen
- (Serbia) Milica Otašević to (Serbia) Jagodina
- (North Macedonia) Sanja Dabevska to (Israel) Hapoel Ashdod
- (Serbia) Aleksandra Bakša to (Serbia) Vojvodina
- (Serbia) Tina Paunić to (Italy) Jomi Salerno
- (Serbia) Isidora Sujić to (Serbia) Naisa
- (Brazil) Ana Luisa Da Silva to (Spain) San José Obrero
- (Serbia) Anja Vujnović to (Czech Republic) DHK Baník Most
- (Serbia) Milica Tasić free agent
- (Angola) Leopoldina Cristóvão free agent

== Club officials ==
=== Coaching staff ===
Position	Name
Manager	(Serbia) Zoran Barbulović
Assistant manager	(Serbia) Jelena Kostić
Assistant manager	(Serbia) Milutin Bralović
Goalkeeper coach	(Serbia) Dragan Stankovski
Analyst	(Japan) Shoto Kudo
Doctor	(Serbia) Saša Makulović
Physiotherapist	(Serbia) Bojana Simonović
Team Assistant	(Serbia) Radomir Savić
Team Assistant	(Israel) Stefan Petrović
Head of Delegation	(Serbia) Slađana Savić
