= Serbian Super League of Handball for Women =

Serbian Super League
- Sport: Handball
- Founded: 2006; 20 years ago
- No. of teams: 12
- Country: Serbia
- Confederation: EHF
- Most recent champion: ŽRK Crvena Zvezda (3rd title)
- Most titles: Radnički Belgrade (14 titles)
- Relegation to: Super B League

The Serbian Super League of Handball for Women (Serbian: Суперлига Србије у рукомету за жене / Superliga Srbije u rukometu za žene) is the top women's handball league in Serbia. The league is composed of 12 teams. The league is operated by the Handball Federation of Serbia.

== Teams ==
The twelve teams of the 2026/27 season.

| Team | City |
|---|---|
| Crvena Zvezda | Belgrade |
| Partizan | Belgrade |
| Napredak | Kruševac |
| Bor | Bor |
| Bekament | Aranđelovac |
| HC Naisa Niš | Niš |
| Temerin | Temerin |
| Mladost | Nova Pazova |
| Jagodina | Jagodina |
| ŽRK Ruma | Ruma |
| Vojvodina | Novi Sad |
| Radnički | Kragujevac |

== Champions (2007-) ==
| Season | Champion | Runner-up |
|---|---|---|
| 2006/07 | Knjaz Miloš | HC Naisa Niš |
| 2007/08 | HC Naisa Niš | Kikinda |
| 2008/09 | Vrnjačka Banja | HC Naisa Niš |
| 2009/10 | Zaječar | Kikinda |
| 2010/11 | Zaječar | ŽORK Jagodina |
| 2011/12 | Zaječar | ŽORK Jagodina |
| 2012/13 | Zaječar | ŽORK Jagodina |
| 2013/14 | Radnički Kragujevac | ŽORK Jagodina |
| 2014/15 | Radnički Kragujevac | ŽORK Jagodina |
| 2015/16 | Izvor Bukovička Banja | Naisa Niš |
| 2016/17 | Medicinar | Bekament |
| 2017/18 | ŽORK Jagodina | Bekament |
| 2018/19 | ŽORK Jagodina | Bekament |
| 2020/21 | ŽORK Jagodina | Radnički Kragujevac |
| 2021/22 | ŽRK Železničar Inđija | Bekament |
| 2022/23 | ŽORK Jagodina | ŽRK Železničar Inđija |
| 2023/24 | ŽRK Crvena Zvezda | ŽRK Železničar Inđija |
| 2024/25 | ŽRK Crvena Zvezda | ŽORK Jagodina |
| 2025/26 | ŽRK Crvena Zvezda | Naisa Niš |

=== Titles by Club (2007-) ===
| Club | Titles | Years Won |
|---|---|---|
| Zaječar | 4 | 2010, 2011, 2012, 2013 |
| ŽORK Jagodina | 4 | 2018, 2019, 2021, 2023 |
| ŽRK Crvena Zvezda | 3 | 2024, 2025, 2026 |
| Izvor Bukovička Banja | 2 | 2007, 2016 |
| Radnički Kragujevac | 2 | 2014, 2015 |
| HC Naisa Niš | 1 | 2008 |
| Vrnjačka Banja | 1 | 2008 |
| Medicinar | 1 | 2017 |
| ŽRK Železničar Inđija | 1 | 2022 |

== Serbian all-time champions (1953–present) ==
| Club | Titles | Years Won |
|---|---|---|
| Radnički Belgrade | 14 | 1972, 1973, 1975, 1976, 1977, 1978, 1979, 1980, 1981, 1982, 1983, 1984, 1986, 1987 |
| Zaječar | 4 | 2010, 2011, 2012, 2013 |
| ŽORK Jagodina | 4 | 2018, 2019, 2021, 2023 |
| ŽRK Crvena Zvezda | 3 | 2024, 2025, 2026 |
| Spartak Subotica | 3 | 1957, 1960, 1963 |
| Voždovac Belgrade | 2 | 1971, 1988 |
| Radnički Kragujevac | 2 | 2014, 2015 |
| HC Naisa Niš | 1 | 2008 |
| Železničar Belgrade | 1 | 1954 |
| BSK Belgrade | 1 | 1961 |
| Vrnjačka Banja | 1 | 2008 |
| Medicinar | 1 | 2017 |
| ŽRK Železničar Inđija | 1 | 2022 |

== See also ==
- Serbian First League of Handball
- Handball Federation of Serbia
