= Jelena Nišavić =

Serbian handball player (born 1980)

Personal information
- Nationality: Serbian
- Born: 17 September 1980 (age 46) Belgrade, SFR Yugoslavia
- Height: 1.68 m (5 ft 6 in)

Sport
- Sport: Handball
- Position: Left wing
- Current club: RK Radnički Kragujevac
- Number: 11
National team
Years	Team	Apps	(Gls)
–	Serbia	114	(159)
Medal record
Representing Serbia
World Championship
Silver medal – second place	2013 Serbia	Team
Representing Serbia and Montenegro
Mediterranean Games
Silver medal – second place	2005 Almería	Team

Jelena Nišavić Serbian: Јелена Нишавић, born 17 September 1980) is a Serbian handball player. She plays for RK Radnički Kragujevac and is also a member of the Serbian national team.

== Individual awards ==
- Carpathian Trophy Top Scorer: 2011
