= ŽRK Aranđelovac =

- Full name: ŽRK Bekament Bukovička Banja Aranđelovac
- Founded: 1968
- League: Super Liga
- 2015-2016: 1st

ŽRK Bekament Bukovička Banja Aranđelovac is a women's handball club from Aranđelovac in Serbia. ŽRK Bukovička Banja competes in the Super Liga.

== Honours ==
- Super Liga
  - Winners (2) : 2007, 2016

== European record ==
Season	Competition	Round	Club	1st leg	2nd leg	Aggregate
2016–17	EHF Cup	R1	(Cyprus) AC Latsia Nicosia	38–14	33–20	71–34
2016–17	EHF Cup	R2	(Netherlands) SERCODAK Dalfsen	26–34	28–25	54–59

== Team ==
=== Current squad ===
Squad for the 2016–17 season

Goalkeepers

- (Serbia) Ana Kačarević
- (Serbia) Marijana Karić
- (Serbia) Marija Simić
- (Serbia) Ilijana Ugrcić

Wingers
RW

- (Serbia) Ana Kojić
- (Serbia) Tamara Zarković

LW

- (Serbia) Tamara Grbić
- (Serbia) Timea Milosević

Line players

- (Serbia) Marija Petrović
- (Serbia) Sanja Rajović

Back players
LB

- (Serbia) Milica Anić
- (Serbia) Tamara Preković
- (Serbia) Andjela Radojićić
- (Serbia) Katarina Stanić

CB

- (Serbia) Danjiela Ilić
- (Serbia) Maja Radoićić
- (Serbia) Marina Tomić

RB

- (Serbia) Jovana Djoković
- (Serbia) Jovana Mrljes
- (Serbia) Ana Tomković
