= Handball Federation of Serbia =

Handball governing body in Serbia

Handball Federation of Serbia RSS
- IOC nation: Republic of Serbia (SRB)
- Sport: Handball
- Other sports: Beach Handball; Wheelchair Handball
- Official website: www.rss.org.rs

HISTORY
- Year of formation: 17 December 1949; 76 years ago

AFFILIATIONS
- International federation: International Handball Federation (IHF)
- IHF member since: 1950; 76 years ago
- Continental association: European Handball Federation
- National Olympic Committee: Olympic Committee of Serbia
- Other affiliation(s): Mediterranean Handball Confederation

GOVERNING BODY
- President: Božidar Đurković

HEADQUARTERS
- Address: Tošin Bunar, New Belgrade
- Country: Serbia
- Secretary General: Aleksandar Petrović

FINANCE
- Sponsors: BYD; Dunav osiguranje Hummel International

The Handball Federation of Serbia (RSS) (Serbian: Rukometni savez Srbije, Рукометни савез Србије) is the governing body of team handball in Serbia. It is based in Belgrade.

== Hosted tournaments ==
- 1979 Women's Junior World Handball Championship
- 2004 European Men's U-18 Handball Championship
- 2009 European Women's U-17 Handball Championship
- 2012 European Men's Handball Championship
- 2012 European Women's Handball Championship
- 2013 World Women's Handball Championship
