= RK Zaječar =

Serbian handball club

- Full name: Rukometni klub Zaječar
- Founded: 1949
- Dissolved: 2013
- Arena: SRC Kraljevica
- Capacity: 3,000
- Club colours
Home	Away

RK Zaječar (Serbian Cyrillic: РК Зајечар) was a Serbian handball club based in Zaječar.

== History ==
Founded in 1949, the club played in the Yugoslav Handball Championship for three seasons from 1984 to 1987. They returned to the top flight in the 1989–90 season, but were promptly relegated.

In 2012, the club earned promotion to the Serbian Handball Super League. They also reached the Serbian Handball Cup final in the 2012–13 season, losing to Partizan.

== Sponsorship ==
During its history, the club has been known by a variety of names due to sponsorship reasons:

- Kristal Zaječar

== Notable players ==
The list includes players who played for their respective national teams in any major international tournaments, such as the Olympic Games, World Championships and European Championships:

- (Montenegro) Vuk Lazović
- (Serbia) Marko Krsmančić

== Head coaches ==
- (Serbia and Montenegro) Zlatko Krsmančić
- (Serbia) Aleksandar Radosavljević
