= ŽORK Jagodina =

- Full name: Ženski Omladinski Rukometni Klub Jagodina
- Arena: JASSA Sports Center
- Capacity: 2,600
- President: Aleksandar Miladinović
- Head Coach: Dragan Markov
- League: Handball League of Serbia; WHRL
- Club colours
Home	Away

Location of ŽORK Jagodina

ŽORK Jagodina is a women's handball club from Jagodina, Serbia. Currently, ŽORK Jagodina competes in the Handball League of Serbia and WHRL.

== Kits ==
HOME
Hummel
2019–20

== Honours ==
- National Championships :
  - Winners (5) : 2018, 2019, 2020, 2021, 2023
  - Runners-up (5) : 2011, 2012, 2013, 2014, 2015
  - KUP Srbije (3) : 1993, 2014, 2020
  - Super Kup (1) : 2020

=== Current squad ===
Squad for the 2025–26 season

Goalkeepers

- (Serbia) Teodora Vranić
- (Serbia) Marija Petrović

Wingers
RW

- (Serbia) Milica Obradović

LW

- 2 (Montenegro) Aneta Adžić
- 18 (Serbia) Zoe Petrović

Line Players

- (Brazil) Moraes Gominho Maia Camila Vitoria
- (Serbia) Tatjana Trbović

Back players

- 5 (Serbia) Ivona Milosavljević
- 8 (Serbia) Anja Belić
- 9 (Brazil) Ferreira de Olivera Leticia Christina
- 11 (Serbia) Jelena Bogdanović
- (Serbia) Katarina Tanasković
