= Serbia women's national handball team =

Serbia

Information
- Association: Handball Federation of Serbia
- Coach: Sandra Kolaković
- Assistant coach: Dragana Cvijić
- Most caps: Katarina Krpež Slezak (146)
- Most goals: Andrea Lekić (517)

Colours
| 1st | 2nd |

Results

World Championship
- Appearances: 9 (First in 2001)
- Best result: Silver: (2013)

European Championship
- Appearances: 12 (First in 2000)
- Best result: 4th (2012)
- Last updated on Unknown.

Serbia women's national handball team
Medal record

World Championship
| Silver medal – second place | 2013 Serbia | |
| Bronze medal – third place | 2001 Italy | |

Mediterranean Games
| Gold medal – first place | 2013 Mersin | Team |
| Silver medal – second place | 2005 Almería | Team |
| Bronze medal – third place | 2022 Oran | Team |

Summer Universiade
| Bronze medal – third place | 2015 Gwangju | Team |

Carpathian Trophy
| Silver medal – second place | 2004 Cluj-Napoca | |
| Silver medal – second place | 2011 Drobeta-Turnu Severin | |
| Silver medal – second place | 2022 Bistrita | |
| Bronze medal – third place | 2000 Cluj-Napoca/Zalău | |
| Bronze medal – third place | 2001 Cluj-Napoca | |

Intersport Cup
| Silver medal – second place | 2010 Tromsø/Bodø | |

The Serbia women's national handball team represents Serbia in international women's handball. It is governed by the Handball Federation of Serbia and takes part in international handball competitions.

The Olympic Committee of Serbia has declared the women's national handball team the best female team of the years 2001 and 2013.

== Results ==
The Serbian Handball Federation is considered the direct successor to Yugoslavia and Serbia and Montenegro by EHF.

=== Summer Olympics ===
| Year | Round | Position | GP | W | D | L | GS | GA |
|---|---|---|---|---|---|---|---|---|
| 1976–1988 | part of Yugoslavia | | | | | | | |
| (Spain) 1992 | qualified and later suspended | | | | | | | |
| (United States) 1996 | suspended from playing qualification tournaments | | | | | | | |
| (Australia) 2000 | did not qualify | | | | | | | |
| (Greece) 2004 | did not qualify | | | | | | | |
| Since 2006 | Serbia | | | | | | | |
| (China) 2008 | did not qualify | | | | | | | |
| (United Kingdom) 2012 | did not qualify | | | | | | | |
| (Brazil) 2016 | did not qualify | | | | | | | |
| (Japan) 2020 | did not qualify | | | | | | | |
| (France) 2024 | did not qualify | | | | | | | |
| (United States) 2028 | future events | | | | | | | |
| (Australia) 2032 | future events | | | | | | | |
| Total | 0/8 | – | 0 | 0 | 0 | 0 | 0 | 0 |

=== World Championship ===
| Year | Round | Position | GP | W | D | L | GS | GA |
|---|---|---|---|---|---|---|---|---|
| 1957–1990 | part of Yugoslavia | | | | | | | |
| (Norway) 1993 | qualified and later suspended | | | | | | | |
| (Austria) / (Hungary) 1995 | suspended from playing qualification tournament | | | | | | | |
| (Germany) 1997 | did not qualify | | | | | | | |
| (Denmark) / (Norway) 1999 | did not qualify | | | | | | | |
| (Italy) 2001 | Third place | 3rd | 9 | 6 | 1 | 2 | 313 | 236 |
| (Croatia) 2003 | Main group stage | 9th | 8 | 5 | 0 | 3 | 258 | 241 |
| (Russia) 2005 | did not qualify | | | | | | | |
| Since 2006 | Serbia | | | | | | | |
| (France) 2007 | did not qualify | | | | | | | |
| (China) 2009 | did not qualify | | | | | | | |
| (Brazil) 2011 | did not qualify | | | | | | | |
| (Serbia) 2013 | Runner-up | 2nd | 9 | 7 | 0 | 2 | 240 | 197 |
| (Denmark) 2015 | Round of 16 | 15th | 6 | 2 | 1 | 3 | 164 | 168 |
| (Germany) 2017 | Round of 16 | 9th | 6 | 3 | 2 | 1 | 188 | 152 |
| (Japan) 2019 | Main round | 6th | 9 | 5 | 1 | 3 | 272 | 258 |
| (Spain) 2021 | Main round | 12th | 6 | 4 | 0 | 2 | 167 | 143 |
| (Denmark) / (Norway) / (Sweden) 2023 | Main round | 21st | 6 | 1 | 0 | 5 | 141 | 153 |
| (Germany) / (Netherlands) 2025 | Main round | 12th | 6 | 3 | 1 | 2 | 157 | 169 |
| (Hungary) 2027 | future events | | | | | | | |
| (Spain) 2029 | future events | | | | | | | |
| (Czech Republic) / (Poland) 2031 | future events | | | | | | | |
| Total | 9/17 | – | 65 | 36 | 7 | 23 | 1900 | 1717 |

=== European Championship ===
| Year | Round | Position | GP | W | D | L | GS | GA |
|---|---|---|---|---|---|---|---|---|
| (Germany) 1994 | part of Yugoslavia suspended from playing qualification tournament | | | | | | | |
| (Denmark) 1996 | did not qualify | | | | | | | |
| (Netherlands) 1998 | did not qualify | | | | | | | |
| (Romania) 2000 | Main group stage | 7th | 6 | 3 | 1 | 2 | 178 | 176 |
| (Denmark) 2002 | Main group stage | 6th | 7 | 4 | 0 | 3 | 223 | 200 |
| (Hungary) 2004 | Main group stage | 12th | 6 | 1 | 0 | 5 | 165 | 200 |
| Since 2006 | Serbia | | | | | | | |
| (Sweden) 2006 | Preliminary round | 14th | 3 | 0 | 0 | 3 | 77 | 92 |
| (North Macedonia) 2008 | Preliminary round | 13th | 3 | 0 | 0 | 3 | 87 | 93 |
| (Denmark) / (Norway) 2010 | Preliminary round | 14th | 3 | 0 | 0 | 3 | 71 | 91 |
| (Serbia) 2012 | Semi-finals | 4th | 8 | 4 | 1 | 3 | 213 | 209 |
| (Hungary) / (Croatia) 2014 | Preliminary round | 15th | 3 | 0 | 0 | 3 | 56 | 72 |
| (Sweden) 2016 | Main group stage | 9th | 6 | 2 | 1 | 3 | 158 | 176 |
| (France) 2018 | Main group stage | 11th | 6 | 2 | 0 | 4 | 164 | 168 |
| (Denmark) / (Norway) 2020 | Preliminary round | 13th | 3 | 1 | 0 | 2 | 79 | 88 |
| (Slovenia) / (North Macedonia) / (Montenegro) 2022 | Preliminary round | 15th | 3 | 0 | 0 | 3 | 66 | 88 |
| (Austria) (Hungary) (Switzerland) 2024 | Preliminary round | 21st | 3 | 0 | 0 | 3 | 67 | 78 |
| (Czech Republic) (Poland) (Romania) (Slovakia) (Turkey) 2026 | qualified | | | | | | | |
| (Denmark) (Norway) (Sweden) 2028 | future event | | | | | | | |
| (Belgium) (France) 2030 | future event | | | | | | | |
| (Denmark) (Germany) (Poland) 2032 | future event | | | | | | | |
| Total | 14/19 | – | 60 | 17 | 3 | 40 | 1604 | 1731 |

** Red border color indicates that tournament was held on home soil.

=== Mediterranean Games ===
- 1993 – Suspended
- 1997 – 4th
- 2001 – 4th
- 2005 – Runners-up
- 2009 – 5th
- 2013 – Champions
- 2018 – 8th
- 2022 – 3rd

=== Other tournaments ===
Carpathian Trophy

- Carpathian Trophy 1999 – 5th place
- Carpathian Trophy 2000 –
- Carpathian Trophy 2001 –
- Carpathian Trophy 2002 – 4th
- Carpathian Trophy 2004 –
- Carpathian Trophy 2006 – 5th
- Carpathian Trophy 2011 –
- Carpathian Trophy 2018 – 4th
- Carpathian Trophy 2022 –

Møbelringen Cup/Intersport Cup

- Møbelringen Cup 2001 – 4th place
- Møbelringen Cup 2010 –
- Møbelringen Cup 2014 – 4th

== Team ==
=== Current squad ===
The squad for the 2026 European Women's Handball Championship.

Head coach: Sandra Kolaković

| No. | Pos. | Name | Date of birth (age) | Height | App. | Goals | Club |
|---|---|---|---|---|---|---|---|
| 2 | RW | Tijana Simić | 22 May 2003 (age 23) | 1.75 m | 8 | 3 | (Serbia) ŽRK Crvena zvezda |
| 3 | LW | Aleksandra Stamenić | 12 July 1998 (age 28) | 1.67 m | 37 | 66 | (Serbia) ŽRK Crvena zvezda |
| 4 | CB | Teodora Majkić | 6 October 2000 (age 26) | 1.70 m | 16 | 6 | (Serbia) ŽRK Crvena zvezda |
| 8 | LW | Jelena Stojanović | 16 April 2003 (age 23) | 1.72 m | 0 | 0 | (Serbia) ŽRK Naisa |
| 10 | LB | Aleksandra Vasić | 5 January 2005 (age 21) | 1.79 m | 9 | 15 | (Serbia) ŽORK Bor |
| 11 | CB | Nora Fajfrić | 18 March 2004 (age 22) | 1.76 m | 4 | 2 | (Serbia) ŽRK Naisa |
| 12 | GK | Molli Kubina | 14 May 2002 (age 24) | 1.78 m | 16 | 0 | (Serbia) ŽRK Crvena zvezda |
| 19 | CB | Leana Milosavljević | 19 June 2007 (age 19) | 1.75 m | 3 | 8 | (France) Stella Saint-Maur Handball |
| 21 | P | Sanja Stamenković | 19 August 2001 (age 25) | 1.72 m | 0 | 0 | (Serbia) GZRK Napredak-12 |
| 23 | P | Katarina Bojičić | 13 March 1998 (age 28) | 1.79 m | 42 | 49 | (Serbia) ŽRK Crvena zvezda |
| 24 | LB | Jovana Skrobić | 9 April 1996 (age 30) | 1.82 m | 45 | 136 | (Montenegro) ŽRK Budućnost Podgorica |
| 27 | GK | Gordana Petković | 24 March 1991 (age 35) | 1.77 m | 13 | 1 | (Serbia) ŽORK Bor |
| 34 | RW | Dunja Radević | 25 November 2005 (age 20) | 1.69 m | 43 | 76 | (Montenegro) ŽRK Budućnost Podgorica |
| 36 | GK | Marija Simić | 21 February 2000 (age 26) | 1.77 m | 18 | 0 | (Poland) KPR Kobierzyce |
| 37 | RB | Lara Stanić | 23 March 2006 (age 20) | 1.66 m | 2 | 0 | (Serbia) ŽRK Crvena zvezda |
| 44 | CB | Tamara Mandić | 2 August 2005 (age 21) | 1.75 m | 10 | 6 | (Serbia) ŽRK Naisa |
| 66 | LB | Jelena Knežević | 25 January 1998 (age 28) | 1.4 m | 9 | 12 | (Switzerland) LC Brühl Handball |
| 74 | P | Katarina Mančić | 19 June 1997 (age 29) | 1.81 m | 3 | 2 | (Serbia) ŽORK Bor |
| 77 | CB | Aleksandra Vukajlović | 7 June 1997 (age 29) | 1.71 m | 56 | 93 | (Serbia) ŽRK Crvena zvezda |

=== Famous players ===
- Dragana Cvijić
- Sanja Damnjanović
- Kristina Liščević
- Svetlana Kitić – 1988 IHF World Player of the Year
- Andrea Lekić – 2013 IHF World Player of the Year
- Katarina Tomašević

==== Notable decorated players ====
Top Scorer

- Katarina Krpež Šlezak (right wing) 50 goals, 2018 European Championship

All-Star Team members

- Sanja Damnjanović (left back), 2012 European Championship, 2013 World Championship
- Andrea Lekić (centre back), 2012 European Championship
- Dragana Cvijić (line players), 2013 World Championship

=== Coaching history ===
- (Serbia) Saša Bošković (2011–2016)
- (Serbia) Dragica Đurić (2016–2017)
- (Serbia) Ljubomir Obradović (2017–2021)
- (Slovenia) Uroš Bregar (2021–2024)
- (Norway) Bent Dahl (2025)
- (Spain) José Ignacio Prades (2025–2026)
- (Serbia) Sandra Kolaković (2026–)

=== Statistics ===
==== Most appearances ====
| # | Name | Matches | Position | Years |
|---|---|---|---|---|
| | Katarina Krpež | 146 | W | 2008–2021 |
| | Tatjana Medved | 120 | OB | |
| | Sanja Damnjanović | 119 | OB | 2006–2019 |
| | Andrea Lekić | 113 | CB | 2006–2020 |
| | Svetlana Ognjenović | 113 | W | |
| | Jelena Nišavić | 111 | W | |
| | Jelena Popović | 109 | OB | |
| | Bojana Popović | 100+ | OB | −2005 |
| | Maja Savić | 100+ | W | −2005 |
| | Jovana Stoiljković | 100+ | OB | |
| | Slađana Pop-Lazić | 100+ | P | |
| | Kristina Liščević | 100+ | CB | |
| | Katarina Tomašević | 100+ | GK | |
| | Tanja Milanović | | OB | |

==== Top scorers ====
| # | Name | Goals | Average | Position | Years |
|---|---|---|---|---|---|
| | Andrea Lekić | 517 | | CB | |
| | Katarina Krpež | 467 | | W | |
| | Sanja Damnjanović | 463 | | OB | |
| | Jelena Erić | 250+ | | OB | |
| | Dragana Cvijić | 201 | | P | |
| | Svetlana Ognjenović | 200+ | | W | |
| | Jelena Popović | 177 | | OB | |
| | Bojana Popović | | | OB | −2005 |
| | Sandra Kolaković | | | CB | |
| | Bojana Radulović | | | OB | −1999 |
