= Erna (given name) =

Erna is a Germanic feminine given name. It is a simplified version of Ernesta, in turn from Ernest. People with the name include:

- Erna Aaltonen (born 1951), Finnish ceramist
- Erna von Abendroth (1887–1959), German nurse and trainer/teacher
- Erna Auerbach (1897–1975), German-born British artist and art historian
- Erna Barschak (1888–1958), German teacher and psychologist
- Erna Baumbauer (1919–2010), German casting agent
- Erna Beilhardt, Nazi concentration camp guard and nurse
- Erna Berger (1900–1990), German soprano
- Erna Björk Sigurðardóttir (born 1982), Icelandic footballer
- Erna Bogen-Bogáti (1906–2002), Hungarian fencer
- Erna Braun, Canadian politician
- Erna Brinkman (born 1972), Dutch volleyball player
- Erna Brodber (born 1940), Jamaican writer, sociologist and activist
- Erna Bürger (1909–1958), German gymnast
- Erna Fentsch (1909–1997), German actress and screenwriter
- Erna Fergusson (1888–1964), American writer and historian
- Erna Flegel (1911–2006), German nurse
- Erna Friðriksdóttir (born 1987), Icelandic alpine skier
- Erna Frins (born 1960), Uruguayan physicist
- Erna Furman (1926–2002), Austrian-American child psychologist
- Erna Gräsbeck (1879—1958), Finnish operatic soprano
- Erna Gunther (1896–1982), American anthropologist
- Erna Hanfstaengl (1885–1981), German acquaintance of Adolf Hitler
- Erna P. Harris (1906–1995), American journalist and businesswoman
- Erna Hennicot-Schoepges (born 1941), Luxembourgish politician
- Erna Herchenröder (1903–1977), German trade unionist and politician
- Erna Kelm (1912–1962), German woman killed trying to cross the Berlin Wall
- Erna Lazarus (1903–2006), American screenwriter
- Erna Lendvai-Dircksen (1883–1962), German photographer
- Erna Low (1909–2002), Austrian businesswoman
- Erna Lúðvíksdóttir (born 1961), Icelandic multi-sport athlete
- Erna Mohr (1894–1968), German zoologist
- Erna Morena (1885–1962), German actress
- Erna Osland (born 1951), Norwegian teacher and author
- Erna Paris, Canadian writer
- Erna Petermann (1912–?), Nazi concentration camp overseer
- Erna Petri (1920–2000), Nazi war criminal
- Erna Rosenstein (1913–2004), Polish surrealist painter
- Erna Sack (1898–1972), German soprano
- Erna Scheffler (1893–1983), German jurist
- Erna Schillig (1900–1993), Swiss painter
- Erna Schilling (1884–1945), German nightclub dancer and artist's model
- Erna Schneider Hoover (born 1926), American mathematician
- Erna Schürer, Italian actress
- Erna Sellmer (1905–1983), German actress
- Erna Siikavirta (born 1977), Finnish keyboard player
- Erna Solberg (born 1961), Norwegian politician
- Erna Sondheim (1904–2008), German fencer
- Erna Spoorenberg (1925–2004), Dutch soprano
- Erna Steinberg (1911–2001), German Olympic sprinter
- Erna Steuri (1917–2001), Swiss alpine skier
- Erna Tauro (1916–1993), Finnish-Swedish pianist and composer
- Erna Viitol (1920–2001), Estonian sculptor
- Erna Villmer (1889–1965), Estonian actress
- Erna Visk (1910–1983), Estonian and Soviet politician
- Erna Wallisch (1922–2008), alleged Nazi concentration camp guard
- Erna Weill (1904–1996), American German-Jewish sculptor
- Erna Woll (1917–2005), German composer
- Erna Beth Yackel (1939–2022), American mathematics educator
