= Abendroth =

Abendroth is a German surname (from German Abendrot, "evening red", "afterglow"). Notable people with the surname include:

- Amandus Augustus Abendroth (1767–1842), German jurist
- August Abendroth (1796–1867), Hamburg jurist, merchant and philanthropist
- Erna von Abendroth (1887–1959), pioneering German nurse and trainer/teacher
- Ernst K. Abendroth, American biologist who researched in Antarctica
  - Abendroth Peak a mountain in Antarctica named after Ernst K. Abendroth
- Heide Göttner-Abendroth (born 1941), German feminist
- Hermann Abendroth (1883–1956), German conductor
- Irene Abendroth (1871–1932), Polish soprano
- Martin Abendroth (1883–1977), German opera singer and voice teacher
- Walter Abendroth (1896–1973), German composer
- William H. Abendroth (1895–1970), United States Army Major General
- Wolfgang Abendroth (1906–1985), German jurist

== See also ==
- Abendrot (album), a studio album by American emo band, You Blew It!
- Abendroth & Root Manufacturing Co, American manufacturer
- "Im Abendrot", the last poem of Four Last Songs
