= ADB =

ADB or adb may refer to:

== Arts and media ==
- Active Dimension Battle, a battle system in computer gaming
- Allgemeine Deutsche Biographie, a biographical reference work in the German language
- Australian Dictionary of Biography, Australia's pre-eminent dictionary of national biography

== Businesses and organizations ==
=== Banks ===
- African Development Bank (also AfDB), a multilateral development finance institution
- Agricultural Development Bank (disambiguation), several financial institutions:
  - Agricultural Development Bank of Ghana
  - Agricultural Development Bank of Pakistan
  - Agricultural Development Bank of Trinidad and Tobago
- Asian Development Bank, a regional development bank

=== Other businesses and organizations ===
- Advanced Digital Broadcast, supplier of digital TV set-top-boxes for cable, satellite, terrestrial and telecommunications
- Amarillo Design Bureau, a company specializing in tactical and strategic board wargames
- Antonov Airlines (ICAO code designator)

== Technology ==
- Adaptive Driving Beams, a system that adapts a car's headlights to avoid glare
- New Zealand ADB class diesel multiple unit, a type of diesel railway vehicle used on Auckland's suburban network
- Advanced Debugger, a general-purpose debugger for Unix platforms
- Android Debug Bridge, a command-line tool for Android
- Apple Desktop Bus, a bit-serial computer bus for connecting low-speed devices to computers

== Other uses ==
- Alarm Distress Baby Scale (ADBB)
- Adnan Menderes Airport in Izmir, Izmir Province, Turkey (IATA airport code ADB)
- Atauran (ISO 639-3 code: adb), of the Wetarese language of East Timor
- Approved Document B, the official building code guidance document on fire for England and Wales; see Building regulations in the United Kingdom
