= Royal Foundation =

Independent United Kingdom-based charity

Royal Foundation of The Prince and Princess of Wales
- Formation: September 2009; 17 years ago as The Foundation of Prince William and Prince Harry
- Type: Charitable organization
- VAT ID no.: 7033553
- Registration no.: 1132048
- Headquarters: Kensington Palace; Palace Green; London, England W8 4PU
- Region served: United Kingdom
- Chairman of the Board of Trustees: Simon Patterson
- Chief Executive Officer: Sarah Henwood
- Key people: Patrons: The Prince of Wales; The Princess of Wales; Trustees: Alice Webb; Claire Wills; Ian Patrick; Tom White; Dame Pippa Harris; Sir Dave Lewis; Sir Ron Kalifa; Zeinab Badawi
- Website: www.royalfoundation.com
- Formerly called: The Foundation of Prince William and Prince Harry (2009–2011); The Royal Foundation of The Duke and Duchess of Cambridge and Prince Harry (2011–2018); The Royal Foundation (2018–2019); The Royal Foundation of The Duke and Duchess of Cambridge (2019–2022)

The Royal Foundation of The Prince and Princess of Wales is an independent United Kingdom-based charity which supports the non-profit work of the Prince and Princess of Wales.

Established in 2009 as The Foundation of Prince William and Prince Harry, it initially focused on their charitable initiatives. Catherine Middleton and Meghan Markle joined the foundation upon their marriages in 2011 and 2018 respectively. Prince Harry and his wife Meghan quit the foundation in 2019 to found Archewell, a mix of for-profit and not-for-profit business organisations.

The foundation's projects revolve around conservation, environmental issues, early childhood development, mental health, emergency services, and homelessness. Key initiatives include United for Wildlife, which aims to prevent illegal wildlife trade, and Heads Together, which promoted mental health awareness. The Centre for Early Childhood, led by Catherine, advocates for early childhood development and launched the Shaping Us campaign in 2023 to raise awareness of the importance of early years. Prince William’s Homewards initiative addresses homelessness through partnerships.

The foundation previously managed the Earthshot Prize, an environmental award established by Prince William in 2020 to promote climate solutions, before it was spun off into the Earthshot Prize Foundation in 2022.

== History ==
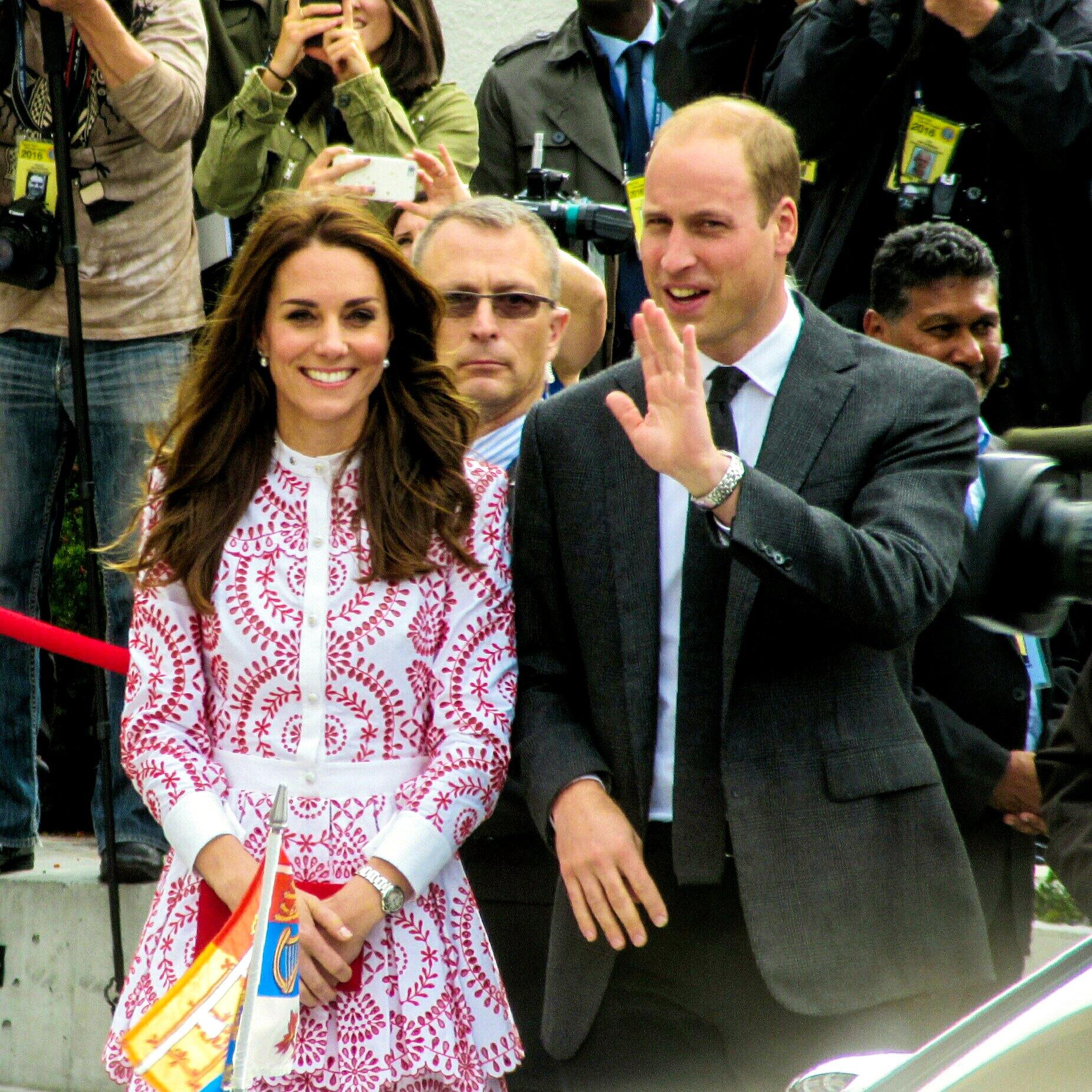
The Prince and Princess of Wales, the current patrons

The foundation was formed in September 2009 by Prince William and Prince Harry as the Foundation of Prince William and Prince Harry to take forward their charitable ambitions. Catherine Middleton (now Princess of Wales) and Meghan Markle (now Duchess of Sussex) later joined as patrons of the foundation in 2011 and 2018 upon their marriages. Prince Harry and Meghan left the foundation in June 2019, opting to focus on their own charitable initiatives through Archewell, a mix of for-profit and not-for-profit business organisations, which they founded in October 2020.

== Activities ==
In the month prior to their wedding in April 2011, Prince William and Catherine set up a gift fund to allow well-wishers to donate money to charities the couple cared about in lieu of gifts. The gift fund supported 26 charities of the couple's choice, incorporating the armed forces, children, the elderly, art, sport, and conservation. The fund eventually raised over £1 million for the respective organisations.

The foundation made its first grant in April 2011 to Fields in Trust, a charity which preserves recreational spaces across the UK. In June, it partnered with Ark in developing their "Expanding Horizons" programme, which aimed to support the lives of children. In January 2012, the foundation announced partnership with The Forces in Mind Trust to support former UK military personnel and their families. In July, the Coach Core initiative was launched by Prince William, Catherine and Prince Harry to provide sports apprenticeship for undereducated and unprivileged youth. Coach Core celebrated its first graduation in January 2015, with a reception held at St. James's Palace. In 2018, the Coach Core Awards took place at Loughborough University, celebrating the achievements of apprentices and graduates. As of 2018, Coach Core has had over 400 apprentices and graduates across ten locations.

In July 2014, the foundation, alongside True Colours Trust, launched Pallative Care Pilot, a programme to test methods for supporting families facing serious or terminal illnesses. Later that year, the foundation established the Full Effect project alongside St. Ann's, to help adolescent children find support to avoid youth violence. The project provided after-school programmes for 250 children per week. In May 2016, Prince William created a taskforce to prevent cyberbullying among the youth by recruiting industry partners. In November 2017, the prince launched the Stop Speak Support campaign, designed from the research by the taskforce, to help young people advocate against online bullying.

The Royal Foundation Forum was held in February 2018, attended by Prince William, Catherine, Prince Harry, and Meghan Markle. Under the theme "Making A Difference Together," the event held in central London showcased programmes run or initiated by the foundation, such as Heads Together, the Invictus Games, and United For Wildlife. In November 2019, the foundation established Step into Energy, in partnership with NextOp as part of the Veterans Transatlantic Partnership, to help UK and US military veterans gain work in the energy sector, with a focus on employment and mental health.

In July 2020, the foundation established an emergency response fund to address the impact of the COVID-19 pandemic, through which they granted £1.8 million to 10 charities that benefit mental health issues, new mothers, education, and frontline workers. In August 2022, the foundation reported an income of £20.4 million for 2021, an increase from £6.7 million in 2019. £16.4 million was spent on charitable activities, £12.1 million of which was for the Earthshot Prize. In the same month, it was reported that the foundation kept £1.1m with JPMorgan Chase, known for its investments in fossil fuels, as well as £1.7m in a fund managed by Cazenove Capital, which owns shares in food companies criticised for buying palm oil due to its environmental impacts. Kensington Palace responded to the reports, stating that since 2015 the foundation had adhered to Church of England's ethical investment guidelines and prohibits fossil fuel investments. It was added that Cazenove was required to follow a strict investment policy based on the Church's investment guidance.

In November 2023, the mayor of Greater Manchester's office and the foundation each contributed £50,000 to support the Manchester Peace Together Alliance's efforts. The money will go toward starting a job, skill-building, and training programme for young people who are in danger of experiencing violence. In April 2025, it was announced that the foundation had been making undisclosed donations for the renovation of facilities at Aros Hall in Tobermory and Pennyghael Community Hall in Pennyghael.

=== Conservation ===
==== United for Wildlife ====
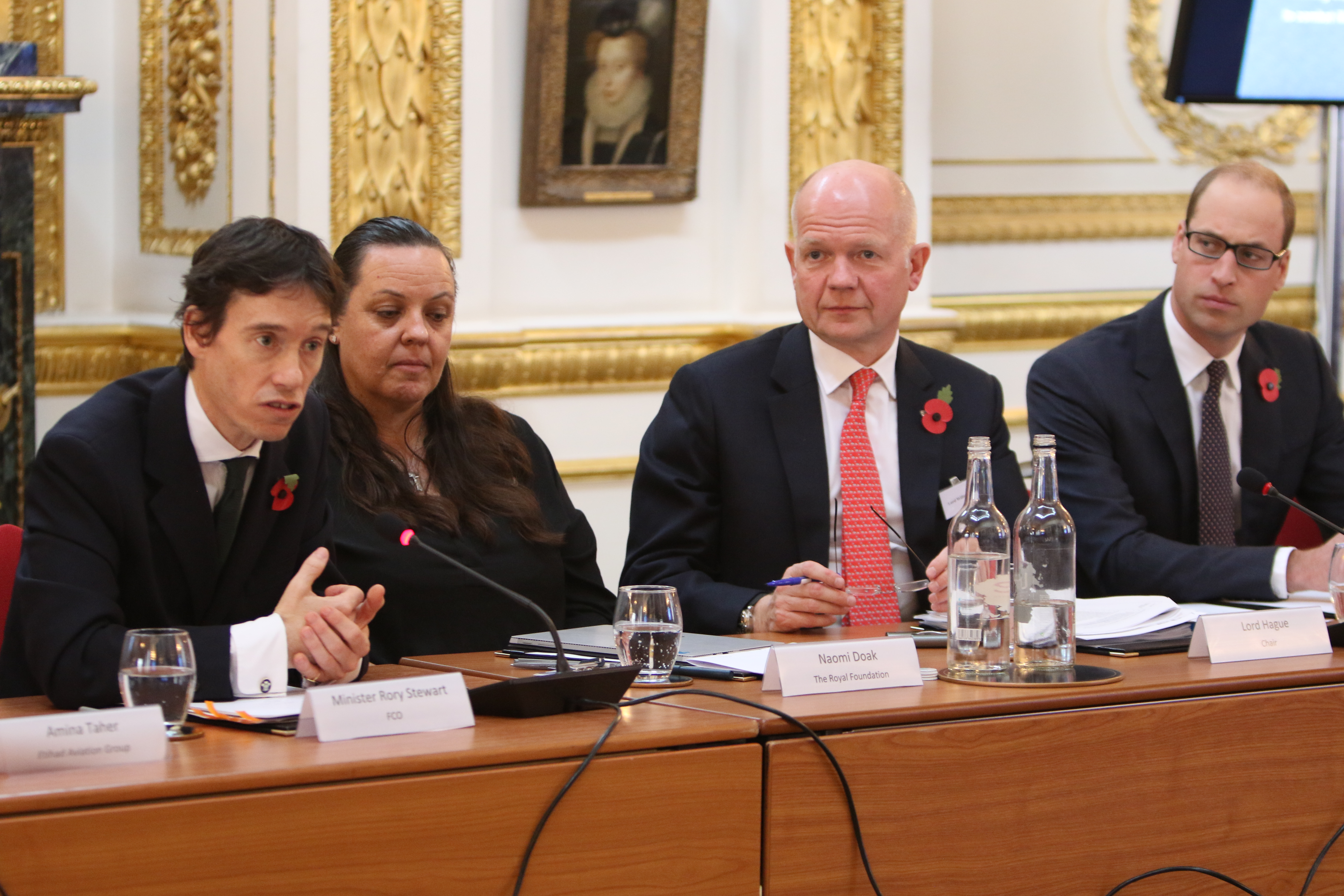
Prince William (far right) attends a United for Wildlife Transport Taskforce meeting in 2017.

In September 2014, William founded the United for Wildlife initiative and launched the Transport Taskforce, made up of seven conservation organisations, with aims to reduce worldwide illegal wildlife trade and protect natural resources. The taskforce pledged to enhance the response to conservation crises worldwide. Over 68,000 industry employees have since been trained to work to prevent illegal wildlife trade. In March 2016, the taskforce led the signing of a declaration at Buckingham Palace to eliminate illegal trafficking routes and increase information and research sharing, composed of 45 signatories globally.

In 2017, the taskforce produced a film, I Am a Ranger, which explained the mission and dangers of wildlife rangers in Africa; it won the award for Best Micro Movie at the Jackson Hole Film Festival. In October 2018, the taskforce signed the Mansion House declaration, which committed 30 global banks and financial organisations to prevent illegal wildlife trade. In May 2019, Prince William held a meeting of the taskforce with both the financial and transport sectors of the group to discuss joint efforts and successes in the area. In March 2023, a partnership was announced between United for Wildlife and InterPortPolice, followed by another partnership with the United Nations Office on Drugs and Crime in July that year. In November 2024, Prince William announced a five-year financial package, partly funded by the foundation, to provide rangers across Africa with subsidised health and life insurance. In May 2025, United for Wildlife launched Guardians, a six-part BBC Earth series on the dangers faced by wildlife rangers. In November 2025, William launched a partnership between the foundation, the Coordination of Indigenous Organisations of the Brazilian Amazon (COIAB), and the Podaali Fund to support Indigenous defenders in the Amazon through legal, emergency, and outreach aid. In June 2026, the company brought together companies such as Alibaba, Amazon, Baidu, eBay, Etsy, Google, Meta, TikTok, Pinterest, Weibo, Chainalysis, PayPal, Luno, Tether, Circle, TRM Labs, Vodafone, Vodacom, Safaricom, British Airways, and Heathrow to tackle online wildlife trafficking through the use of AI, disruption to its financial flow, and holding public awareness campaigns.

==== Earthshot Prize ====
William and Catherine announced the Earthshot Prize, initially run by the foundation, in December 2019 after consulting various organisations and experts.

The project which was launched in October 2020 is slated to give £50 million in funds until 2030, in accordance with five categories detailing the restoration and protection of nature, air cleanliness, ocean revival, waste-free living, and climate action. The prize is backed by a global alliance of environmental organizations including the WWF, Greenpeace, Oceana and Conservation International. The project was also set up to align with the United Nations's Sustainable Development Goals. The prize is judged by an appointed council composed of 13 members including David Attenborough, Hindou Oumarou Ibrahim, and Christiana Figueres.

Submissions for the first prize ceremony opened in November 2020. The first ceremony took place on 21 October 2021 in London. In July 2022, it was announced that after being a part of the foundation for two years, the Earthshot Prize had become an independent charity.

=== Mental health ===
In February 2014, Catherine launched Moving Parents and Children Together, also known as M-PACT Plus, in partnership with Place2Be and Action on Addiction. The initiative provided early support and counseling for children between ages 8 and 17 impacted by parental drug abuse. The project was subsequently merged with Action on Addiction's M-PACT parent programme. In July 2017 and in response to the Grenfell Tower fire, the foundation launched the Support4Grenfell Community Hub in north Kensington in collaboration with charities such as Child Bereavement UK, Winston's Wish and Place2Be. It was tasked to provide emotional support to survivors and those affected. In October 2017, the foundation and the Ministry of Defence formalised a partnership to change the discourse around mental health in the armed forces. On World Mental Health Day in 2017, the foundation announced that it had allocated £2 million to launch Mental Health Innovations, a charity to develop new ways to discuss mental health.

In January 2018, Catherine launched Mentally Healthy Schools, an online initiative for primary school teachers and staff, providing free access on resources to support children's mental health in the classroom. She also held sessions for the programme at the Mental Health in Education conference in 2019. After two years of development, the website had over 250,000 visitors to the site accessing resources. The project was subsequently handed to the Anna Freud Centre, which continues to develop and expand its curriculum for secondary schools.

In November 2022, the foundation, in collaboration with the Two Ridings Community Foundation, announced £345,000 worth of funding for local communities and organisations in Scarborough that support young people's mental health through their work. In the same month, the foundation announced that it would "provide advice and support" for Ukrainian first lady Olena Zelenska's mental health initiative, which is meant to address the impact of the Russian invasion of Ukraine on the mental wellbeing of Ukrainians.

In February 2023, the foundation partnered with Life at No.27 to create therapy allotments and gardens supporting mental health in communities across South Wales. In October, the foundation released the results of a survey conducted in the previous month of 1,817 young people who were quizzed about their mental health. According to the survey, 59 percent of 16 to 24-year-olds supported increasing public awareness of mental health issues, 39 percent reported experiencing emotional struggles, and 95 percent believed their peers were likely facing mental health challenges.

In September 2025, it was announced that the foundation, in partnership with the Jac Lewis Foundation and Welsh Rugby Union, would fund a mental health hub at Principality Stadium, offering counselling and transport for those at risk of suicide. That year, the foundation began co-funding a two-year pilot by Norfolk and Waveney Mind as part of an initiative to promote the mental wellbeing of employees at the Sandringham Estate and members of the wider community.

In September 2026, William launched On Your Side, a nationwide initiative developed in partnership with the British Standards Institution and mental health charity Chasing the Stigma, encouraging sport to incorporate suicide prevention measures into its culture. A promotional video was also released for the project, which has the backing of 70 organisations including the Football Association, Premier League, Team GB, British Cycling, and various mental health charities.

==== Heads Together ====
In April 2016, the foundation announced the Heads Together campaign, led by Prince William, Catherine, and Prince Harry, aiming to tackle the stigma of mental health and provide supportive resources. The full details of the campaign were released at a launch event in May 2016. The campaign was first envisioned by Catherine earlier that year. Catherine later voluntarily talked about her problems as a mother, and admitted that she suffered a "lack of confidence" and "feelings of ignorance" during certain periods of time. In 2017, the campaign launched #OKtoSay, a film series aimed at encouraging open discussions about mental health. Later that year, Heads Together partnered with the 2017 London Marathon with 750 runners participating in the Mental Health Marathon.

In September 2018, William launched Mental Health at Work, a Heads Together initiative, with aims to change the approach to workplace mental health in the UK. The programme served 100,000 site visitors within the first six months. In May 2019, the prince partnered with The Football Association (FA) to launch Heads Up, a campaign that uses football to influence discussions on mental health. In January 2020, all third-round FA Cup games were delayed by one minute in support of the campaign. That season, all football games in England were dedicated to Heads Up and raising awareness of mental health. Later that month, William and Catherine launched Shout, an affiliate of Crisis Text Line in the U.K. that offers free, confidential mental health support through text in the United Kingdom 24/7. In June 2020, Prince William revealed he had been serving as a volunteer during the COVID-19 pandemic. As of November 2020, the programme has facilitated over half a million conversations.

==== National Suicide Prevention Network ====
In October 2025, on World Mental Health Day, it was announced that the foundation had given £1 million to establish a National Suicide Prevention Network in the UK, involving the Jac Lewis Foundation, James’ Place, Mikeysline, and PIPS Suicide Prevention Ireland. More than a dozen organisations joined the network as founding partners, including Hub of Hope.

==== Invictus Games ====
£1 million of funding for Prince Harry's Invictus Games project was provided by the foundation, with an equal amount being pledged by the Chancellor of the Exchequer George Osborne from treasury funds generated by fines imposed on banks as a result of the Libor scandal. In 2020, the Invictus Games Foundation had a £1.77 million income, £500,000 of which was transferred from the foundation's Endeavour Fund that was established in 2012 by Prince Harry. In June 2020, the management of the Games was transferred to the Invictus Games Foundation.

=== Early years ===
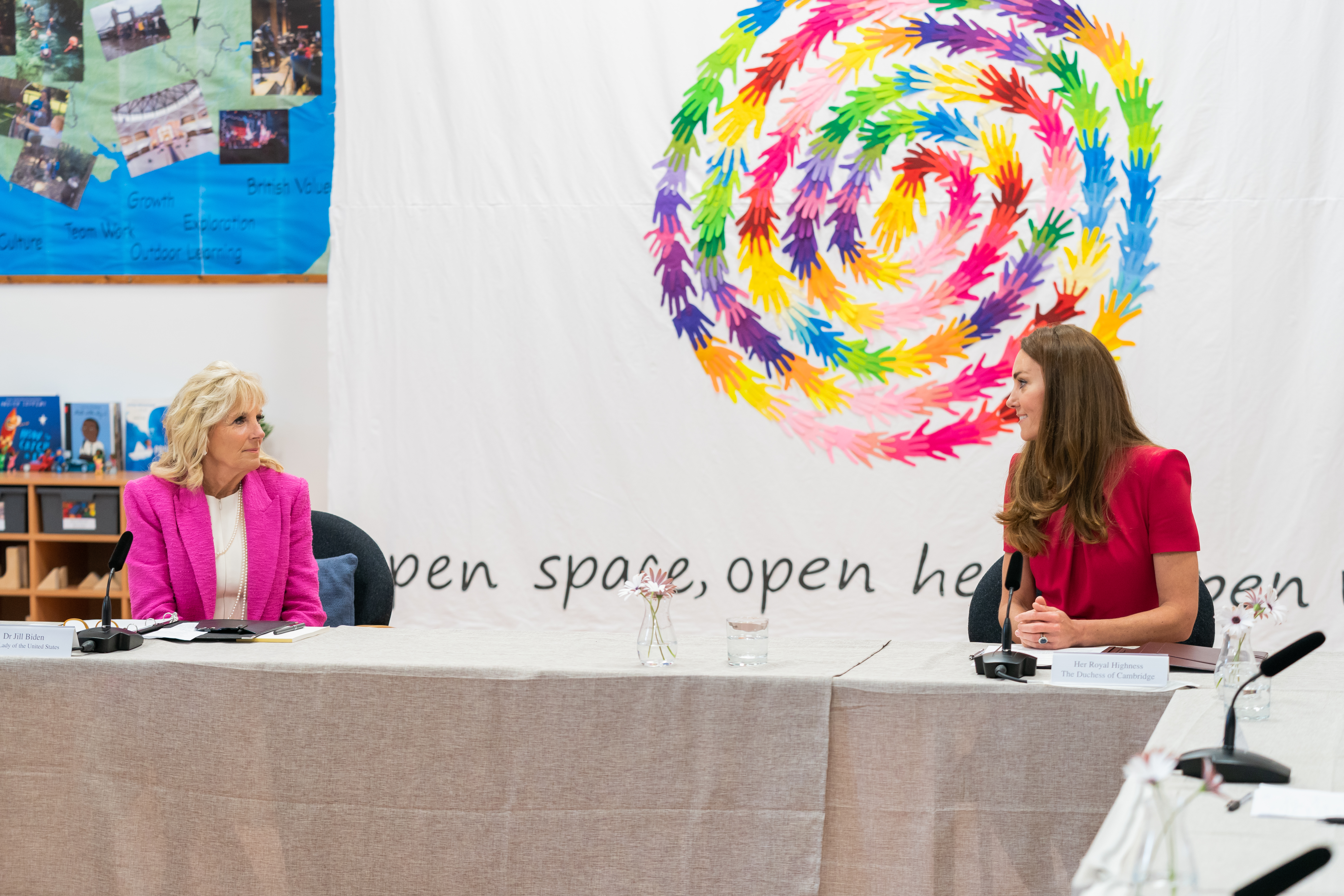
Catherine attending an Early Years roundtable meeting with Jill Biden in June 2021

In March 2018, Catherine hosted a symposium at the Royal Society of Medicine, focusing on children's health, and launched the foundation's Early Intervention Support initiative, which would raise awareness of issues including as youth, maternal, and mental health, as well as parental and educational support and resources. It was announced that a steering group would research solutions to problems facing young people, and how it impacted society and the economy. In July 2020, Catherine supported and assisted in the development of BBC's "Tiny Happy People" initiative, providing free digital resources to parents with young children.

In January 2020, Catherine launched "5 Big Questions on the Under 5's", a nationwide survey on the development of the early years. The survey was commissioned from Ipsos MORI, and contains "further qualitative and ethnographic research" on the early years. The survey received over 500,000 responses. In November 2020, the foundation hosted the online Early Years forum, featuring medical and psychological experts, where Catherine gave a keynote speech on the survey results and the importance of childhood development. The results of the survey were listed as "5 Big Insights", being: data about the societal perspective on the early years in relation to childhood development, the sustainability of parental wellbeing, the effect of peer judgment on parental mental health, the effect of isolation during the COVID-19 pandemic, and the varying amount of health and support in wider communities.

==== Royal Foundation Centre for Early Childhood ====
In June 2021, Catherine launched the centre to conduct work, research, and campaigns with other organisations on the importance of the early years. The centre is run by staff from the foundation and aims to highlight early childhood as a key social issue. Catherine stated her intentions of "creating a happier, more mentally healthy, more nurturing society". The centre's inaugural report, Big Change Starts Small, was published alongside the launch and written in collaboration with Harvard University and the London School of Economics.

In February 2022, Catherine visited Denmark on behalf of the centre. She visited University of Copenhagen and met officials from the Center for Early Intervention and Family Studies. Catherine then visited Stenurten Forest School, to learn about its approach to learning, which focuses on the students' social and emotional development rather than academic skills. In June, she hosted a roundtable with government ministers, including the health secretary Sajid Javid and the minister for families Will Quince, as well as senior civil servants, and representatives from the early years sector, to discuss the foundation's research findings.

In January 2023, Christian Guy was appointed the centre's director. Eight professionals from academia, science and the early years sector were announced as the centre's advisory group-Peter Fonagy, Eamon McCrory, Alain Gregoire, Trudi Seneviratne, Ed Vainker, Carey Oppenheim, Imran Hussain, and Beverley Barnett‑Jones. On 31 January, the centre launched its Shaping Us campaign, which aims to elevate early childhood from a topic of scientific interest to one of the most strategically important issues of our time. The campaign also aims to highlight that all of society has a role to play in building a supportive and nurturing world around children and those who care for them. The launch event was held at the BAFTA headquarters in London and attended by scientists and celebrities. A 90-second animation was also released to be shown ahead of cinema screenings in the UK cinemas and on advertising screens in Piccadilly Circus. The group Practitioners of the Early Years Sector responded to the campaign by stating that besides awareness "long-term investment and funding" was needed. In March, Catherine launched the Business Taskforce for Early Childhood comprising NatWest Group, Unilever, Aviva, Deloitte, IKEA, Co-op, the Lego Group, and Iceland, which will work to engage and support the business sector on the issue of early childhood. She also held the first meeting of the taskforce on March 21 at the NatWest Group's London headquarters. In May 2024, the taskforce published a report presenting the case for prioritising early childhood and outlining the first actions to be taken as a result of its work. In May 2025, Deloitte introduced six months’ paid paternity leave, citing Catherine's influence through the taskforce. The taskforce organised the Future Workforce Summit in November 2025 in London; speakers included the princess, former England manager Gareth Southgate, Professor Robert J. Waldinger of Harvard Medical School, and Professor Marc Brackett of Yale University.

In June 2023, it was announced that the centre had granted £50,000 towards a study in partnership with the Institute of Health Visiting and the University of Oxford, to evaluate the use of the Alarm Distress Baby Scale (ADBB) in the UK. Catherine had first observed the ADBB model's implementation, which is used to assess how babies are interacting with the world around them, focusing on behaviors like eye contact, facial expressions, vocalization and activity levels, during her solo trip to Denmark. The trial ran over a period of 10 months at the South Warwickshire NHS Foundation Trust and Humber Teaching NHS Foundation Trust and returned positive results with involved health visitors reporting an increase in their understanding and abilities in deciphering infant behavior, consequently aiding parent-child interactions. In January 2025, it was announced that the ADBB was being introduced in eight NHS centres after a successful initial trial period.

In November 2023, the centre hosted the Shaping Us National Symposium at the Design Museum in London. In the same month, it published an "Issues Index," revealing that a third of people in the UK consider financial pressure to be the most significant concern for parents and carers in 2023. The centre also initiated a campaign encouraging individuals to support their local baby banks by donating items, money, or volunteering their time. In December, the foundation supported 12 locations across the UK to host their own carol services concurrently with the one hosted at Westminster Abbey by Catherine to highlight those who support babies, young children, and families. In February 2025, the Shaping Us campaign released a report advocating for the inclusion of emotional skills in early childhood education, highlighting their role in tackling mental health issues and social isolation. The report stressed the importance of fostering positive social connections from a young age. In August 2025, the centre released a series of animated videos on early childhood development.

In November 2025, five new business initiatives were announced by Salesforce, Kellanova, Amazon, Co-op, and Jude's Ice Cream to support early childhood development. In the same month, the centre announced a £100,000 research project to understand and reduce "technoference" — the distractions from digital devices that interrupt family life. It invited researchers to propose studies with families across the UK, using the findings to help professionals support healthier parent-child connections. Later in the same month, the centre and the Anna Freud Centre began a programme to train health visitors and early-years workers to support infants' social and emotional development. In May 2026, the centre launched "Foundations for Life: A Guide to Social and Emotional Development" for professionals working with young children. In October 2026, the centre launched a study in collaboration with the Duchy of Cornwall on the benefits of nature-based learning for babies and young children.

=== Emergency responders ===
In April 2020, the foundation supported the launch of Our Frontline, a mental health support initiative for emergency workers. It provided digital and online resources, as well as remote counseling, to support workers' mental health during the pandemic. In September 2020, Prince William established the Emergency Responders Senior Leaders Board, commissioned by the foundation to research the mental health and wellbeing of emergency responders. The project was in partnership with King's College London and the Open University. As part of the COVID-19 fund, over 250,000 emergency responders accessed mental health resources through the Blue Light programme, with 2,780 hours of support provided from the Ambulance Staff Charity.

=== Homelessness ===
==== Homewards ====
In June 2023, William launched Homewards after two years of development. The initiative aims to tackle homelessness in six pilot locations across the UK within five years with an initial £500,000 allocated for each area by the foundation. The locations are Lambeth, Bournemouth, Christchurch and Poole, Newport, Northern Ireland, Aberdeen, and Sheffield. The programme is aimed at providing permanent homes, rather than temporary accommodation, for the people in need and will also help local coalitions working on the issue by giving them access to experts and financial backers. A local leader will be appointed in each area, who will oversee the development of the project and bring together local authorities, prisons, schools, and housing associations. A unique plan will be developed in each area with help from 16 charities, landowners, local housing associations, and major retailers. The Homewards Fund is managed and administered by Homeless Link, a national membership charity for homelessness organisations.

In February 2024, William, in partnership with Cornish charity St Petrocs, announced plans for building 24 homes on Duchy of Cornwall land in Nansledan to provide temporary accommodation for people experiencing homelessness in the area. Future plans include building more than 400 social rented homes and a further 475 affordable dwellings in South East Faversham. In March 2024, Homewards Activator Homebase pledged £1 million to support the Homewards initiative in Sheffield and local landlords committed to provide an initial thirty-one homes for individuals prone to homelessness. The Homewards Sheffield Local Coalition, consisting of 70 organisations and members of the local community, was set up to develop plans for tackling homelessness in the area. Homebase also pledged £1 million to provide home starter packs and Pret a Manger lent its support by offering to employ the homeless. With the creative housing projects being built in each site, a pipeline of about 100 homes was already being established as of July 2024. The first anniversary of the initiative was marked by a two-part ITV documentary titled Prince William: We Can End Homelessness and an exhibition at the Saatchi Gallery in London called Homelessness: Reframed to remove the stereotypes about homelessness. The exhibition opened in August 2024. The documentary aired in October that year, with The Daily Telegraph noting that, despite using Prince William’s royal appeal, it effectively humanises homelessness and highlights practical solutions through his genuine commitment.

In February 2025, Homewards announced a partnership with Lloyds Banking Group that would provide an initial investment of £50 million to support housing providers and charities across Homewards' six different locations. The initiative had previously enlisted companies like Homebase, Pret a Manger, and NatWest to provide funding, training, and jobs for homeless people. The following month, Homewards partnered with Hays to expand employment and training opportunities for homeless individuals and supported Invisible Cities Aberdeen, a social enterprise offering guided city tours. In July 2025, Homewards and Centrepoint announced plans to convert a Duchy of Cornwall property in Lambeth into 16 affordable flats for young people in or moving into work. In March 2026, Homewards launched the New Employment Opportunities Network (NEON) in Northern Ireland to reduce homelessness risk through sustainable employment opportunities for people experiencing, or at risk of homelessness, with an initial focus on young people with experience of the care system.
