= Erna Barschak =

German psychologist (1888–1958)

- Born: 9 December 1888; Berlin, Germany
- Died: 12 October 1958 (aged 69); Philadelphia, United States
- Occupations: Teacher; psychologist

Erna Barschak was a German teacher of vocational education studies and a psychologist. One of her important works is an autobiography about her emigration from Nazi Germany to the US.

== Life ==
Barschak was a leaned typist and bookkeeper and worked in this position for 6 years, until she received a diploma in the field of business education. In 1915 Barschak completed the German Abitur which allowed her to go on to university, where she studied economics, sociology and psychology in Berlin and Tübingen. Throughout her studies Barschak was a teacher at evening schools and after being awarded a doctorate in 1912, she moved on to work as a teacher at the public college for business and economics in Berlin as well as at the Pestalozzi-Fröbel-Haus, known as a social center and school for sociology as well as women's education. During this time Barschak frequently published articles in socio-scientific journals, for example the weekly paper "Social Practice" (Soziale Praxis) published by Susanne Charlotte Engelmann.

In 1930 Barschak became a professor at the public institute for teaching vocational education in Berlin, she was however removed from this post in 1933 following the rise to power of the Nazi party in Germany. Barschak was able to leave Berlin and move to London and Genf to study psychology, which spared her the experience of career stagnation, as well as further occupational and private reprimands. However Barschak returned in 1935, while the Nazis were still in power, for an involvement in the Jewish educational system. She taught psychology and pedagogy at the Jewish academy for the education of teachers in Berlin and was actively involved in the preparation for emigration within the education system. This work, which she organised together with Fritz Bamberger, erroneously associated Barschak with Zionism. In September 1939, notably the month of the invasion of Poland by the Nazis and thus marking the beginning of World War II, Barschak began to prepare her emigration by getting into contact with people she was associated with. In 1940 she reached the US via Great Britain and with the help of the American Association of University Women (AAUW), secured a place as a Refugee Scholar at the Wilson College in Pennsylvania for the academic year 1941/42, a position that a year later would be transferred to Susanne Charlotte Engelmann. Similar to Susanne Charlotte Engelmanns experience, this job opened up a way into academia which fortunately saved the career aspirations of the two women. Hence Erna Barschak subsequently became a professor for psychology at the Miami University in Ohio.

After her emigration to the US, Barschak published an autobiography which collect her experiences as an immigrant. She illustrates a variety of problems for academic war refugees, especially within the new and unfamiliar work environment. For example, she describes the utopian and unrealistic idea, to be able to instantly continue their occupational career in the new home country.

== Publications ==
- Die Schülerin der Berufsschule und ihre Umwelt. Vortrag gehalten auf dem Mädchenberufsschultag des Allgemeinen deutschen Lehrerinnenvereins in Dresden am 4. Okt. 1925, (Pädagogisch-psychologische Schriftenreihe des allgemeinen deutschen Lehrerinnenvereins; 2), Berlin 1926.
- Die Idee der Berufsbildung und ihre Einwirkung auf die Berufserziehung im Gewerbe. Leipzig 1929.
- Der deutsch-literarische Unterricht an kaufmännischen Fach- und Berufsschulen, (Schriften für kaufmännisches Bildungswesen; 3), Leipzig 1925.
- My American Adventure, New York 1945.
- Today's Industrial Nurse and Her Job. A Study of Functions of Nurses and Their Relationship to Industry, New York 1956.
- with Fritz Bamberger: Das 9. Schuljahr der Volkshochschulen der Jüdischen Gemeinde zu Berlin. Zielsetzung und Plangestaltung. Berlin 1937.

== Literature ==
- Christine von Oertzen: "Rückblick aus der Emigration. Die Akademikerinnen Erna Barschak (1888–1958), Susanne Engelmann (1885–1963) und Lucie Adelsberger (1895–1971)". In Angelika Schaser (ed.): Erinnerungskartelle. Zur Konstruktion von Autobiografien nach 1945 (Herausforderungen; 14), Bochum 2003, S. 169–195.
- Christine von Oertzen: Strategie Verständigung. Zur transnationalen Vernetzung von Akademikerinnen 1917–1955. Göttingen 2012.
- Martin Kipp: "Wege zur Freude am Werk, Wissen und Welt. Notizen zu einer Zeitschrift für die weibliche Fortbildungsschuljugend. Zur Erinnerung an die exilierte Berufspädagogin Erna Barschak." In: Karlwilhelm Stratmann (ed.): Berufs- und wirtschaftspädagogische Zeitschriften. Aufsätze zu ihrer Analyse. Frankfurt/M. 1994, S. 219–257.
