= 42nd Street (mental health charity) =

Charity in Greater Manchester, England

42nd Street is a mental health charity in Greater Manchester, United Kingdom, for young people aged 11–25 years old. It provides free and confidential services to young people who are experiencing difficulties with their mental health and emotional wellbeing, by offering young person-centred and rights-based approaches. It was established as a drop-in service in Manchester city centre in 1980 and moved around 2012 to its current location, the Space Youth Intervention Centre, 87-91 Great Ancoats Street, Manchester M4 5AG.

The most recent (as at March 2024) Annual Report of the charity available on its website (for 2020-21) describes the wide range of activities carried out, the various local and national funders, and an annual turnover of around £3.5m

== Brief history ==
The organisation was established in 1980 as a self-governing project of the Youth Development Trust (1963–1991) in response to the growing concern about the lack of mental health services available to young people in Manchester. A group of parents, professionals, and young people came together to create a service that would provide a safe and supportive environment for young people to talk about their problems and access the help they needed. Initially 42nd Street operated as a small drop-in centre at 22 Lloyd Street in the city centre of Manchester, offering advice, support, and counselling to young people aged 13–25 [later aged 11–25]. 42nd Street was founded in response to the lack of self-referral mental health services for young people to provide a service that young people can access themselves where they would not be stigmatised or pathologised because of the mental health problems they are experiencing.

In the mid-1980s the premises were used without permission at weekends for covert surveillance of the LGBTQ+ community in nearby streets by Greater Manchester Police, which was discovered by chance when project staff needed to access their offices out of hours, as they described in a book shortly afterwards.

== Creativity and Wellbeing ==
One of the key features of 42nd Street's work is a focus on creativity and the arts. The organisation believes that creativity can be a powerful tool for young people to express themselves, explore their emotions, and develop coping strategies. To this end, 42nd Street has offered a range of creative arts projects, including drama, music, art, and dance.

== Inclusive working ==
The organisation has run specific groups for LGBTQ+ young people which have been recognised nationally as being beneficial, as has its work with Afro-Caribbean young men, with Jewish young people, and with teenage mothers.

== Manchester Arena Bombing ==
The organisation offered support to young people following the Manchester Arena bombing in 2017.

== Research ==
The organisation staff were co-researchers with academics at the Manchester Metropolitan University in the Loneliness Connects Us study (2016–2019) of loneliness amongst young people, funded by the Co-op Foundation. A key finding was that, "the authors propose shifting narratives about loneliness toward a more engaged conversation that gives a more full and complex social account of the experience rather than seeing it as a problem that individuals have to solve on their own."

Another example of co-produced research was in the "ways in which services can change the focus from managing or 'stopping' self harm to working with young people in more permissive, 'young person centred' ways" and earlier work on self-harm and suicide.

42nd Street has also commissioned external research into its own effectiveness - for example by Anna Freud Centre into the TC42 Service in 2020.

== Awards ==
The Space Youth Intervention Centre, the charity's current location, is a building designed by Maurice Shapero which was awarded the Greater Manchester Building of the Year in 2012 by the Greater Manchester Chamber of Commerce.

In 2015 42nd Street was one of twelve charities in the North of England to receive a Weston Charity Award, following funding pressures in the sector along with a reported "100 per cent increase in the number of young people needing our service over the last two years".
