= Agricultural Development Bank =

Agricultural Development Bank refers to a number of different institutions, including:

- Agricultural Development Bank of China
- Agricultural Development Bank of Ghana
- Agricultural Development Bank of Nepal
- Agricultural Development Bank of Pakistan, also known as Zarai Taraqiati Bank
- Agricultural Development Bank of Trinidad and Tobago

== See also ==
- Agricultural Bank
