= Agricultural Bank =

Agricultural Bank may refer to:

- Agricultural Bank of China
- Agricultural Development Bank of China
- Agricultural Bank of Egypt
- Agricultural Bank of Greece, or ATEbank
- Agricultural Bank of Iceland
- Agricultural Bank of Libya
- Agricultural Bank of Western Australia, now Bankwest
- Bank for Agriculture and Agricultural Co-operatives
- Bank Keshavarzi Iran (lit. Bank of Agriculture Iran)
- Nonghyup Bank, an agricultural bank in South Korea
- Norwegian State Agriculture Bank
- Russian Agricultural Bank
- South Bangla Agriculture and Commerce Bank

== See also ==
- Agricultural Development Bank
