= Anna Freud Centre =

Child mental health research, training, policy and treatment centre in London

Coordinates: 51.5476°N 0.1776°W

Anna Freud
- Founded: 1952
- Type: Charitable organisation
- Registration no.: England and Wales: 1077106
- Purpose: Child psychoanalysis, Mentalization
- Location: London, United Kingdom
- Key people: Eamon McCrory (Chief Executive); Patron: The Princess of Wales
- Website: annafreud.org

The Anna Freud (formerly the Anna Freud National Centre for Children and Families) is a child mental health research, training, treatment and policy advisory charity based in London, United Kingdom. The Centre aims to transform mental health provision in the UK by improving the quality, accessibility and effectiveness of treatment, bringing together leaders in neuroscience, mental health, social care and education. It is closely associated with University College London (UCL) and Yale University. The Princess of Wales is its royal patron. The chair of trustees is the philanthropist Michael Samuel MBE and the chief executive is Eamon McCrory OBE.

== History ==
The Hampstead Child Therapy Course was started by Anna Freud, daughter of Dr.Sigmund Freud, in 1947. Students included Joyce McDougall, who had her first experience of intensive analysis with children whilst on the course. The Hampstead Child Therapy Course and Clinic was founded in 1952 by Anna Freud, Dorothy Burlingham, and Helen Ross, becoming the first child psychoanalytic centre for observational research, teaching and learning. It was established as a charity with the purpose of providing training, treatment and research in child psychoanalysis. After Anna Freud's death in 1982, it was renamed in her honour.

== Activities ==
In 2012 it stated that its aim is to secure its position as the leading psychoanalytic innovator and provider of mental health treatment to children and families in Europe.

=== Treatment ===
The Centre provides short-term and long-term specialist treatments for children suffering from mental health problems.

=== Research ===
The Centre conducts research in collaboration with the Yale University Child Study Center and the Menninger Department of Psychiatry at Baylor College of Medicine. The Centre's historic links with Yale University have been renewed through the recently established Anna Freud Centre/Yale Child Study Center Bridge Programme. Research teams from the Menninger Department of Psychiatry, the Anna Freud and Yale Child Study Center form a developmental and clinical psychoanalytically-inspired research consortium.

The Centre also hosts the Child and Adolescent Mental Health Services (CAMHS) Evidence Based Practice Unit, an interdisciplinary research unit which is part of UCL. Its research focuses on supporting the implementation of evidence-based practice and also gathering practice-based evidence for mental health interventions. Current projects include a national evaluation of therapies (part of the Children and Young People's Improving Access to Psychological Therapies programme); research on shared decision making; and the development of models for resource need as part of the CAMHS Payment by Results project.

Research activity can be funded by public bodies (for example the Education for Wellbeing project is funded by the Department for Education). Individual charities commission the Anna Freud to carry out evaluative research into the effectiveness of their own services (for example 42nd Street (mental health charity) commissioned the Anna Freud to review their TC42 service in 2020). Research can be based on collaboration with other bodies (for example a study into adoption working with Coram and Great Ormond Street Hospital).

In June 2003 a study conducted jointly by the Anna Freud, Great Ormond Street Hospital and Coram Family Adoption Services on the way in which abused children can have their faith in adults restored through adoption was published. In September 2009 a collaborative project involving the Anna Freud, Kids Company and UCL was launched to study what happens to the brains of children who have suffered early trauma. In May 2010 a campaign was launched by the charity Kids Company to raise £5 million to fund a study into how children's brain development is affected by loving care and attachment, with the study work to be conducted by the Anna Freud in partnership with the Institute of Psychiatry, UCL, the Tavistock Clinic and Oxford University.

=== Teaching ===
The Centre offers the following certificate, diploma and master's courses:

- MRes (previously MSc) in Developmental Neuroscience & Psychopathology (in collaboration with UCL and Yale University; Child Study Center). This course was established in 2006 as part of the new Anna Freud Centre/Yale Child Study Center Bridge Programme and addresses a growing interest among both neuroscientists and developmental scholars in integrating ideas of social-emotional development with contemporary understanding of brain development and brain function. It consists of one year of teaching at the Anna Freud/UCL, and one year of independent research at the Yale Child Study Center/Yale University.
- MSc in Early Child Development & Clinical Applications (in collaboration with UCL). The course combines theoretical consideration of psychoanalytic perspectives on developmental issues and inter-family relationships with year-long observations of infants and children.
- MSc in Developmental Psychology & Clinical Practice
- UCL Post Graduate Certificate/Post Graduate Diploma/MSc in Cognitive Behaviour Therapy and other Outcomes-Based Interventions. These new UCL programmes are intended for all professionals working in children's services, including social care, education and health.
- PGCert in Leadership and change

The Centre also offers an extensive range of short courses.

== Library ==
The Anna Freud Library supports the academic, clinical and research activities at the Centre. It currently holds approximately 2,000 books covering both historical and contemporary psychoanalytic material, and subscribes to 22 journal titles. Electronic access to research publications is also available.

== Alumni ==
Notable alumni of the Centre include Erna Furman.

== See also ==
- Psychoanalytic Study of the Child, an academic journal co-founded by Anna Freud
- Freud Museum
- Child Guidance, aka the Child Guidance Movement, a social construct and an influential network of multidisciplinary clinics
