= De La Salle College, Belfast =

Coordinates: 54.57621°N 5.99897°W

Location
- 36 Edenmore Drive; Belfast, BT11 8LT; Northern Ireland

Information
- Motto: Latin: Signum Fidei; English: Sign of faith
- Religious affiliation: Roman Catholic
- Established: 1966; 60 years ago
- Local authority: Education Authority (Belfast)
- Principal: Aine Best
- Gender: Boys
- Age: 11 to 18
- Color: Red Black Gold
- Website: https://www.delasallecollege.org.uk/

De La Salle College is a non-selective boys' secondary Catholic maintained school in Belfast, Northern Ireland. It is a Lasallian educational institution affiliated with the De La Salle Brothers, a Roman Catholic religious teaching order founded by French Priest Saint Jean-Baptiste de La Salle. As of 2018/2019 the school's enrolment was around 926.

== Original Building ==
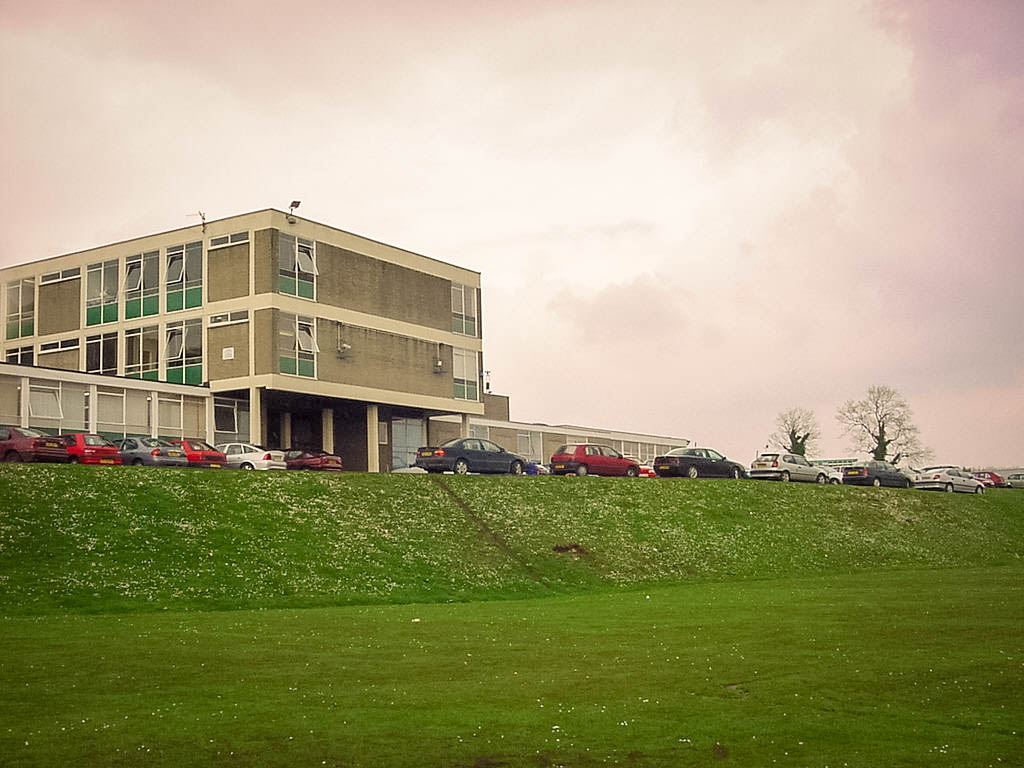
De La Salle College Belfast's old junior school site

As the population in the Andersonstown area in the early 1960s surged, the then Parish Priest, Rev Fr Thomas Cunningham approached the De La Salle Brothers, asking them to establish a Secondary Intermediate School for the local parishes. Only 65% of the Capital cost was funded by the state, leaving £90,000 to be funded by the parishes themselves. The new La Salle Boys’ Secondary School and its sister school, St. Genevieve's, opened their doors to the first pupils in September 1966. La Salle enrolled its first 275 students on the 5th of September 1966. The head of the school was Brother Cornelius. La Salle Secondary School became known as La Salle Boys School.

These early years coincided with the breakout of the Troubles and the school was to serve as a refugee centre for those fleeing the violence on the Lower Falls Road. The new school year in September 1969 was delayed by seven weeks as a result and these circumstances were repeated in 1972 during what was called Operation Motorman, when part of the school was occupied by the British Army. In the same year the school gymnasium was destroyed in an explosion.

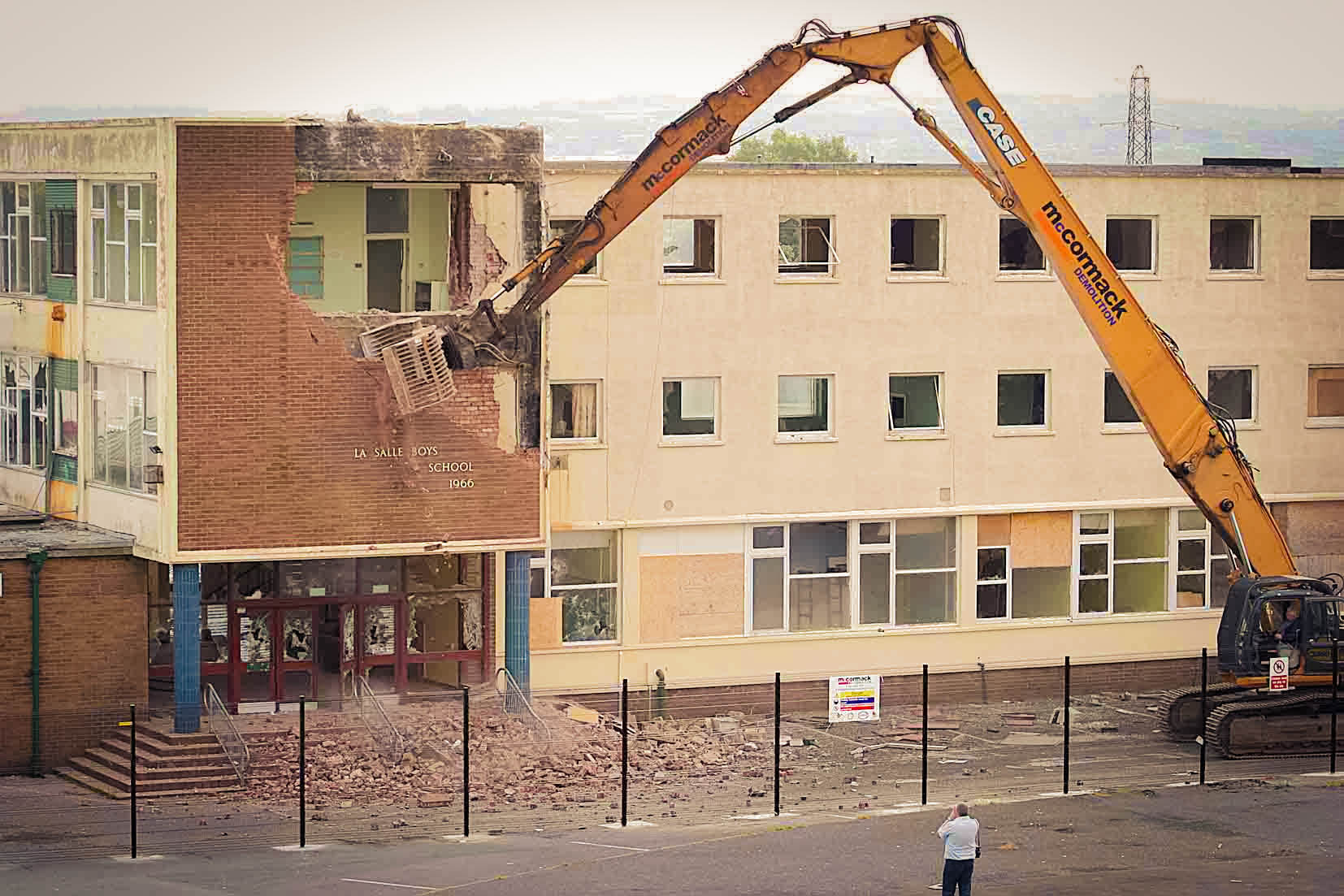
The demolition of the old building in 2005

The building was originally designed for 450-500 students but by the early 1980s it was approaching 1,200. Principal, Brother Dominic was forced to introduce the use of mobile classrooms which encroached on the running track and tennis courts reducing the sports facilities available to students. In 1989 the Junior students moved to the vacant Cross and Passion College building on the Glen Road. While this relieved some of the pressures on the Edenmore Drive site it presented new logistical and financial challenges associated with a split site. This supposedly short term arrangement was to last almost two decades.

After almost 40 years the old buildings were suffering from severe dilapidation. In 2005 the old senior school building on Edenmore Drive was demolished with the senior school temporarily housed in St. Genevieve's old building, now available as they had moved to their new Trench House site in 2002. In 2009 construction of a new building on the old Edenmore Drive site was completed. At this time it became known as De La Salle College. Before the final destruction of the old building some of the original gym floorboards were removed in order to make a display. The names of the first-ever class register taken in 1966 were engraved in the wood and are still displayed in the new building.

== New Building ==
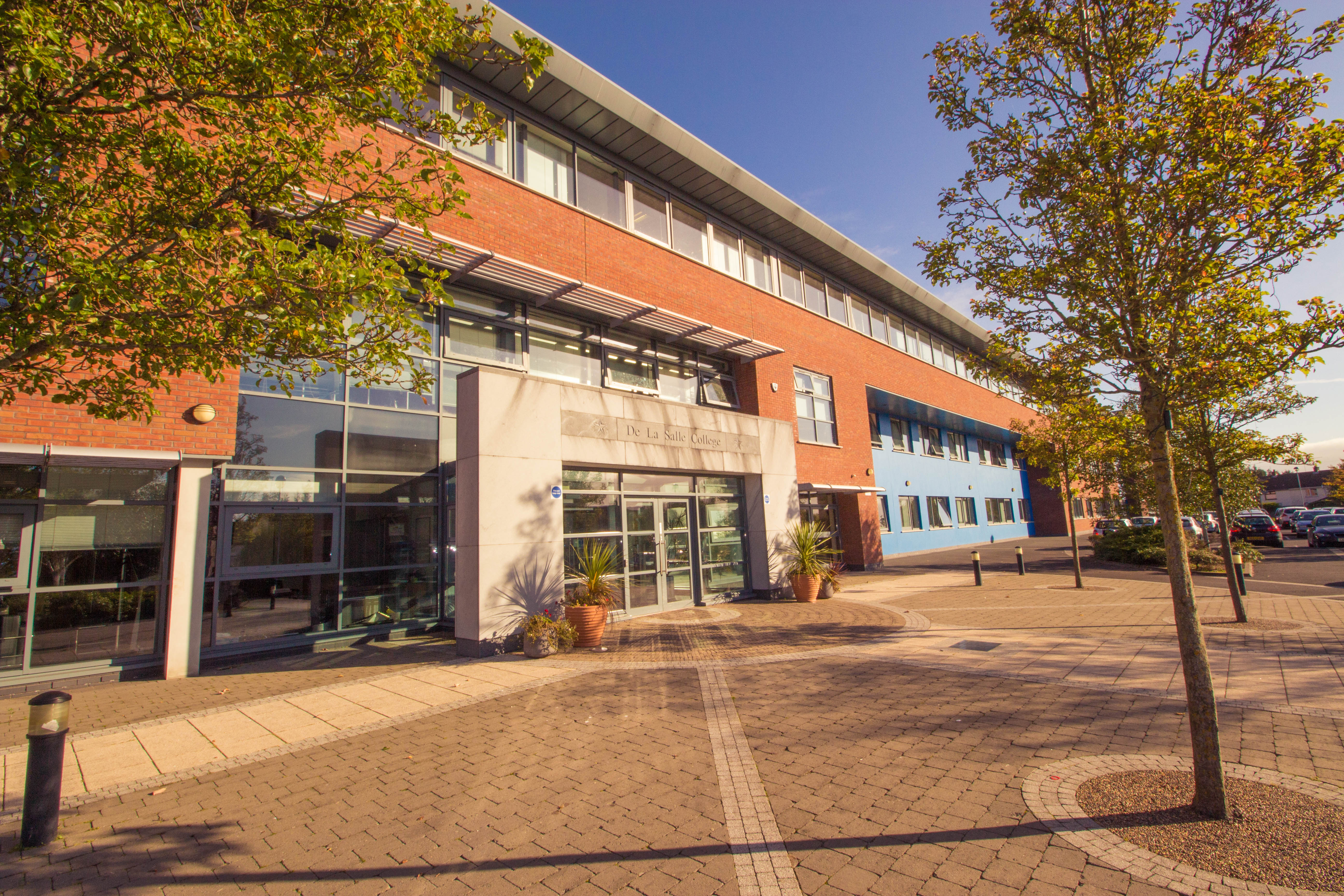
The new building was completed in September 2008

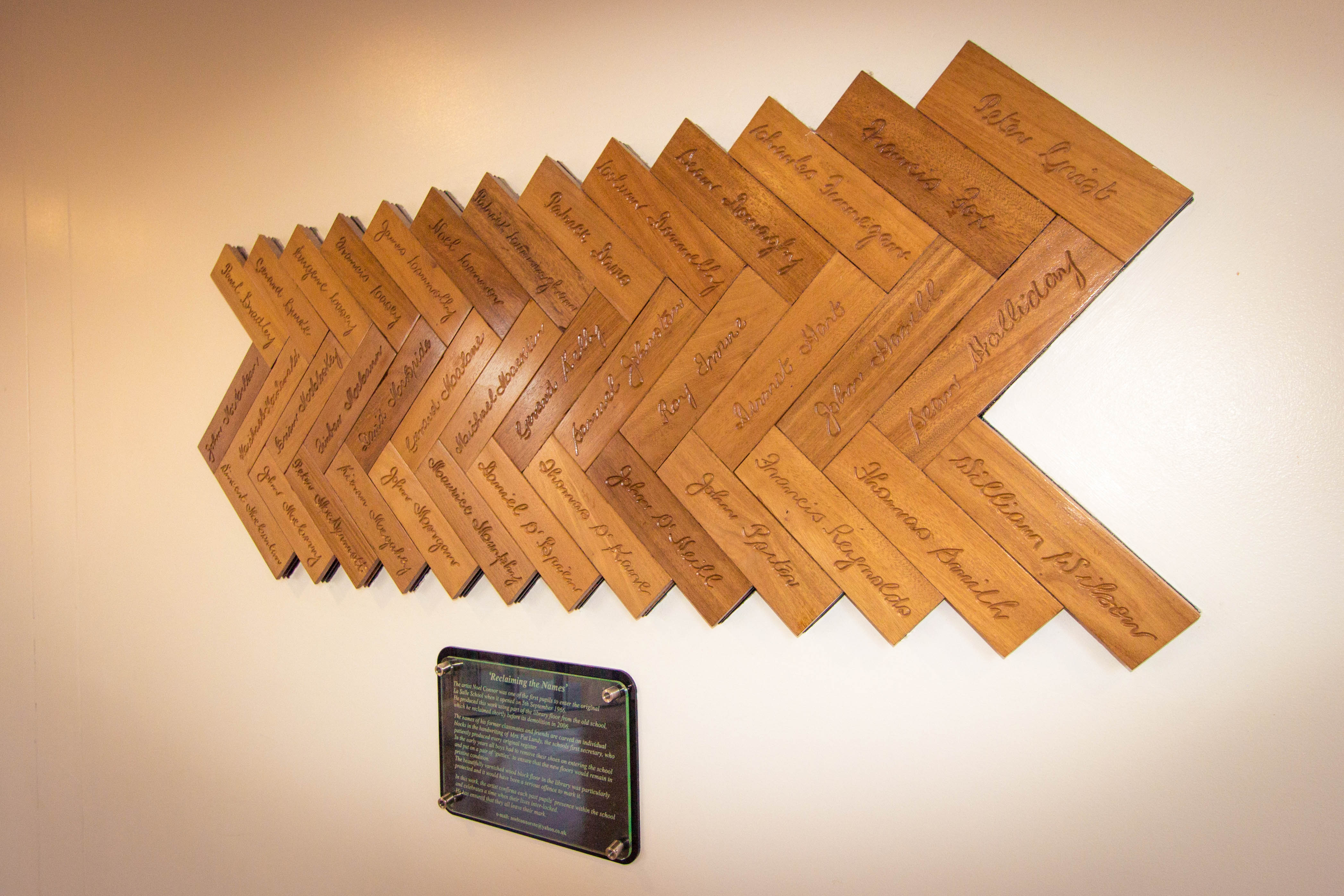
Original floorboards from the old building with the names of the first class register from 1966 engraved.

In September 2008, after over twenty years of operating on two sites, the brand new purpose-built De La Salle College was opened. Located in Andersonstown, it remains one of the most up-to-date schools in Northern Ireland with modern fully-equipped classrooms, laboratories and workshops. Additional funding was secured at that time to allow a double-sized sports hall to be built alongside the gymnasium and the weights and fitness rooms. Outdoor pitches at St Genevieve's are also currently used for PE classes and extra-curricular activities.

The school also includes the chapel of St Jean Baptiste De La Salle and modern facilities for the Home Economics, Technology, Music and Drama department. The new building also serves as an Entertainment Venue and Multi-sports venue after school hours. The De La Salle Sports Complex operates as a private fitness and leisure provision at affordable prices for the local community.

== Sports Complex ==
Prior to opening the school's sports facilities for community use in 2009 and identifying a significant need from within the local community to access quality leisure provision, De La Salle College made an application to the Big Lottery Fund for a multi-use project. The application was for the construction of an enhanced (100% larger) Sports Hall (six courts) to accommodate a wide variety of sports and community events. From the outset, the project had the commitment of local sports clubs and community youth organisations.

In September 2009, De La Salle Sports Complex opened its doors to the community. In addition to the enhanced sports hall (with tiered seating for 200 people), fitness suite and strength and conditioning suite, the existing changing provision, minor hall and spin studio were all opened up for community use, enabling a much more extensive use by a variety of sporting clubs and community users. In 2010 the school developed and opened a fitness suite for community use. Furthermore, in September 2012 the college added an additional strength and conditioning suite.

Some examples of sporting activities and Community use include:

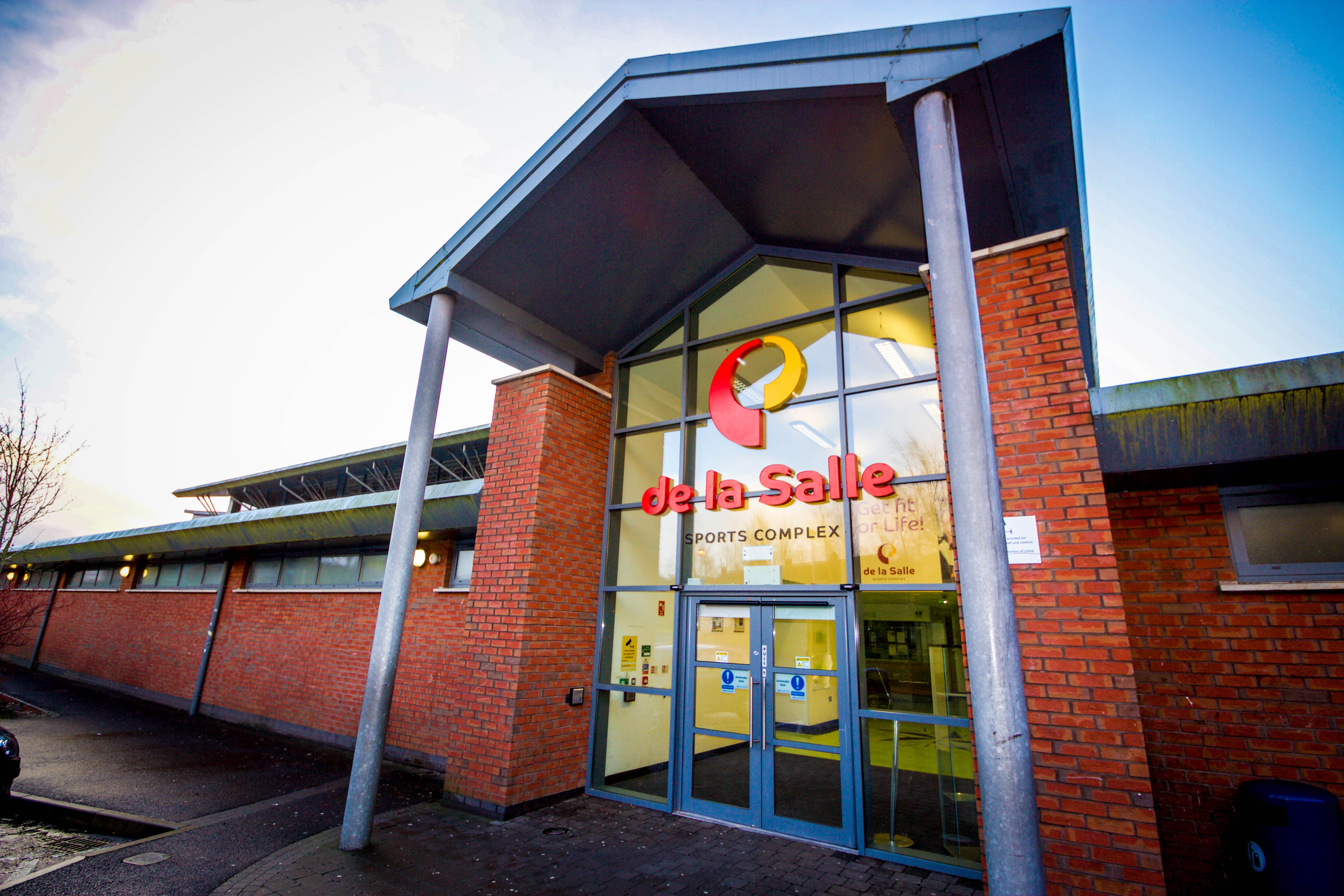
Sports Hall Entrance

- Indoor/winter training venue for GAA and soccer clubs;
- Home training and competition venue for ladies and men's Super League basketball;
- Home training and competition venue for local netball clubs;
- Local 5-a-side soccer leagues;
- Gymnastics and trampoline clubs (Home of NI squads);
- Ballet and dance clubs;
- Boxercise, spin and kettlebell classes; rowing; and zumba dance;
- Fitness suite memberships; and
- Local youth clubs

== Glassmullin sports pavilion ==
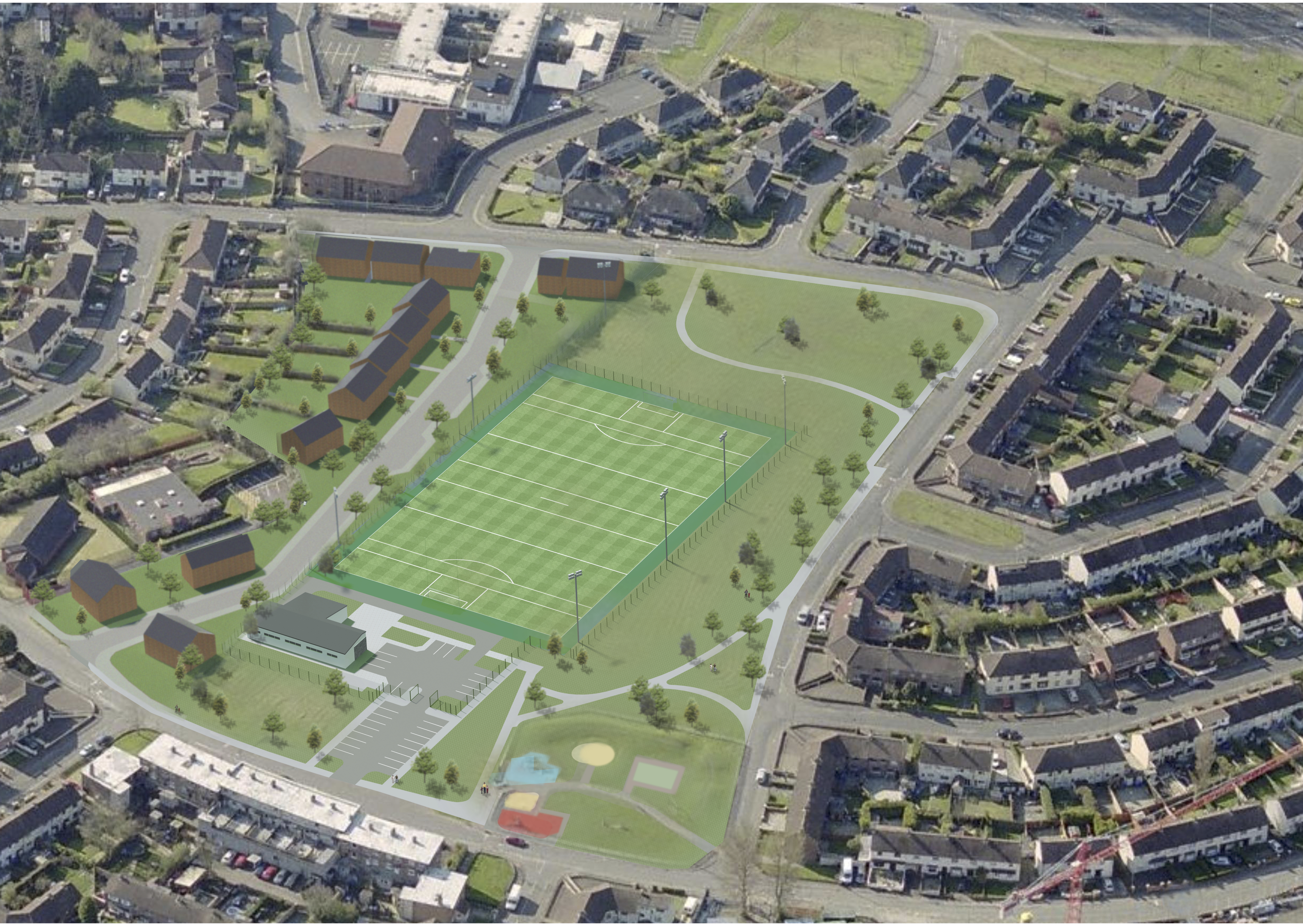
Glassmullin Community Facility & 3G Pitch - Approved Plan

The school has received planning permission and work has begun to turn the land beside Glassmullin Drive and north of Slieveban Drive into a new sports pavilion. Since 2013, local residents have campaigned against the facility, which is funded by the Department of Education NI for De La Salle College. However an agreement was brokered in October 2019 to allow construction work to begin on the new sports facility. Amongst the terms of the agreement is a commitment that there will be no floodlights and a fence will not exceed 2.4 metres at the facility. The agreement also ensured that there will would be no infrastructure put in place for the installation of floodlights at a later date. A seven-person committee made up of school representatives, residents, and an independent chair will be appointed to manage the facility. The Glassmullin facility is now fully functional for P.E. lessons and extra-curricular training, albeit that there is not a full sized GAA pitch at Glassmullin.

== Digital School House ==
De La Salle is an official Digital Schoolhouse. Delivered by Ukie and powered by PlayStation, sponsored by SEGA and Warwickshire County Council, Digital Schoolhouse (DSH) is a not-for-profit programme which enables Secondary schools (Digital Schoolhouses) to deliver creative computing workshops to visiting Primary school pupils. This programme is delivered by S-J Lynch and J Stitt.

== Rights Respecting School ==
De La Salle is a rights respecting school, having received bronze and silver awards in UNICEF's Rights Respecting Schools Award. The school is currently working towards the Gold award.

== Principals ==
- Brother Cornelius (FSC)
- Brother Dominic (FSC)
- Brother Francis (FSC)
- Dr Aidan Hamill
- Mr. Paul Barry
- Mrs. Claire White

== Notable alumni ==
Arts and Media	Business
Anthony Boyle, Actor; Barra Best, BBC NI journalist; Damon Quinn, Comedian and actor; Marty Maguire, Actor; Noel Connor, Poet and artist; Paddy Jenkins, Actor; Declan Wilson, Q Radio, Downtown Radio and BBC Northern Ireland DJ; Dr Greg Caffrey, Composer	Paul McCrory, Secretary British American Tobacco PLC; Peter Curistan, Property Magnate; Sean McLoughlin, Head, New Product Strategy at GlaxoSmithKline
Sport	Academia and Science
Anton Rogan, former professional footballer; Mal Donaghy, former Northern Ireland international footballer; Philip Mulryne, Northern Irish Dominican friar and retired professional footballer; Sean Murphy, Chief Operating Officer for the IFA; Paul McKee, Olympic Sprint Athlete; Brendan Irvine, Olympic Boxer; Jim Webb, Commonwealth Games gold medal-winning boxer; Paddy Gallagher, Commonwealth Games gold medal-winning boxer	Prof Eamon McCrory, Head of Postgraduate Studies at UCL; Stephen Ramsey, Principal of St Gerard’s School
Civil Services	Politics
Liam McIvor, Chief Executive of the Business Services Organisation	Daniel Baker, Sinn Féin councillor and Lord Mayor of Belfast.; Anthony Flynn, Green Party in Northern Ireland councillor.

== See also ==
- List of secondary schools in Belfast
