= Susanne Charlotte Engelmann =

- Born: September 26, 1886; Berlin
- Died: June 26, 1963 (aged 76)
- Parent: Martha Engelmann (mother)

Academic background
- Education: Heidelberg University, University of Berlin
- Thesis: Einfluss des Volksliedes auf die Lyrik der Befreiungskriege (1909)

Academic work
- Era: 20th century
- Discipline: Pedagogy, education
- Sub-discipline: Female education, adult education, methods of indoctrination
- Institutions: Viktoria-Oberlyzeum (Director); Berliner Paulus-Bund (Head of Adult Education); American Social Service Center (Istanbul); Wilson College; Mary Washington College

Susanne Charlotte Engelmann (26 September 1886 – 26 June 1963) was a German professor of education, a Protestant of Jewish descent, who emigrated to the United States following the rise to power of Adolf Hitler and the Nazi Party.

== Education ==
Engelmann was born in Berlin on 26 September 1886. At the turn of the 20th century Engelmann finished her secondary education at an all-girls school there and in 1905 completed her Abitur at the private secondary school established by Helene Lange. Engelmann attended university in Berlin and Heidelberg, where she studied a range of subjects including German, English studies, psychology, and pedagogy. She finished her studies in 1909 with a dissertation on "the influence of the folk song on the lyric poetry of the liberation wars", ("Einfluss des Volksliedes auf die Lyrik der Befreiungskriege"). In 1910 she completed the German teaching accreditation examination and spent that year as a preparatory year at various schools for girls in Berlin. In 1912 she received a licence to teach in secondary schools in Prussia.

Engelmann spent the academic year 1913-14 as a German scholar at Bryn Mawr College in Pennsylvania in the United States. She made professionals contacts at the American Association of University Women (AAUW) and developed her knowledge of the country and the language that later helped her successful immigration and settlement in the U.S. when the rise of National Socialism in Germany forced her to emigrate.

== Work ==
After her stay in the U.S., Engelmann worked as a teacher (Studienrat) for 12 years until she became the director of a secondary school and in 1928 worked as the director of the Viktoria-Oberlyzeum, the first all-girls school in Berlin to offer the Abitur, the examination that marks the end of pre-college education. Engelmann was an important pedagogue during the Weimar Republic working in the field of female education. She published numerous scientific works on this subject and throughout her life worked in teaching or researching education and educational systems.

After the Nazi Party came to power in Germany in 1933, teachers who had a Jewish background, as Engelmann did, were increasingly put under pressure and eventually left the profession. After Engelmann was forced to retire, she contacted Esther Brunauer at the American Association of University Women in Washington. While exploring the possibility of emigration, Engelmann worked as a private teacher of literature, psychology and pedagogy. She was unhappy with the way her career was going but did not want to emigrate without first securing a university position. Unlike most other people who were forced out of her jobs, Engelmann received a small pension, and she lived with her mother, Martha Engelmann, who depended on her income. Beginning in 1935, Engelmann headed the department of adult education at the Berliner Paulus-Bund, a position for which she qualified based on her status as a Protestant and a member of the Confessing Church headed by Martin Niemöller in Berlin. In 1937 she was removed from the post upon the implementation of the Nuremberg Laws. Engelmann then intensified her efforts to emigrate, especially in her correspondence with the AAUW. Her brother helped Engelmann and their mother to flee Germany and join him in Turkey, where he worked for the Turkish Ministry of Economics. Engelmann lived in Istanbul and worked for the American Social Service Center, where she taught educational psychology.

Her mother in June 1940 and Engelmann traveled through Russia, Siberia, Manchuria, and Japan, reaching the U.S. in 1941. She entered the academic field through the help of the American Association of University Women, which placed her as a Refugee Scholar at Wilson College in Pennsylvania for the academic year 1942–43. She held several academic posts over the next several years and in 1947 held her first professorship at the Mary Washington College in Fredericksburg, Virginia, where she worked until her retirement in 1952. Engelmann became an American citizen in 1948. In 1952, she returned to Berlin and received financial compensation for the pension due her but unpaid following her forced retirement in 1933. Some believe her ties to the congregation in Dahlem also led her to return. Another possible attraction was the reconstruction of the German education system. Her later publications were increasingly concerned with the German education system of the 1930s and especially the methods of indoctrination endorsed by the National Socialists.

== Publications ==
- Susanne Charlotte Engelmann, "Der Einfluss des Volksliedes auf die Lyrik der Befreiungskriege", dissertation 1909.
- Susanne Charlotte Engelmann, Die Krise der heutigen Mädchenerziehung, 1929.
- Susanne Charlotte Engelmann, Methodik des deutschen Unterrichts, 1933.
- Susanne Charlotte Engelmann, German Education and Re-Education, 1945.

== Literature ==
- Christine von Oertzen, "Rückblick aus der Emigration: Die Akademikerinnen Erna Barschak (1888-1958), Susanne Engelmann (1885-1963?) und Lucie Adelsberger (1895-1971)", in: Erinnerungskartelle. Zur Konstruktion von Autobiographien nach 1945, edited by Schaser, Angelika (Bochum: Winkler, 2003)
