= Erna Lúðvíksdóttir =

Icelandic multi-sport athlete (born 1961)

- Born: 1961 (age 64–65); New York, United States
- Occupation: Former multi-sport athlete
- Known for: Football, Handball
Association football career
- Positions: Goalkeeper; forward
Senior career*
Years	Team	Apps	(Gls)
1977–1987	Valur		
International career
1982–1987	Iceland	13	(0)
- * Club domestic league appearances and goals
- Handball career
- Sport: Handball
- Position: Defender

Senior clubs
- Years: Team
- 1977–1978: Ármann
- 1978–1989: Valur
- 1989–1995: ZMC Amicitia Zürich
- 1996: ZMC Amicitia Zürich
National team
Years	Team	Apps	(Gls)
19??–1991	Iceland	98	(148)

Erna Lúðvíksdóttir (born 1961) is an Icelandic former multi-sport athlete. She played 98 games for Icelandic national handball team and 13 games for the Icelandic national football team. In 1988, she was named the Best Defender in the Icelandic top-tier handball league.

== Early life ==
Erna was born in New York, United States, in 1961 to Icelanders Lúðvík Jónsson, the CEO of Ísafoldsprentsmiðja, and Guðfinna Elentinusdóttir, a former gymnast. She was one of five siblings, including future footballer Gunnar Lúðvíksson.

== Football ==
Erna started her senior team career with Valur during the winter of 1976–77 when the team participated in the national indoor football tournament. The following summer, she played for Valur when it participated in the national tournament for the first time. She scored Valur's first goal of the season, in a 6–0 victory against Víðir Garður. In 1978, she helped Valur win the national championship. She later transitioned from outfielder to goalkeeper and as such, helped Valur win the national championship and the Icelandic Cup in 1986. She retired from football in 1987 to focus on her handball career.

=== National team career ===
She played 13 games for the Icelandic national football team from 1982 to 1987 and was the captain of the team in her last four games.

=== Titles ===
- Icelandic Championships: 2

- 1978, 1986

- Icelandic Cup: 4

- 1984, 1985, 1986, 1987

== Handball ==
Erna came up through the junior teams of Íþróttafélagið Grótta but transferred to Ármann in 1977 as Grótta did not field a senior team. She played one season with Ármann before transferring to Valur in 1978. She went on to play several seasons in the Icelandic top-tier Úrvalsdeild kvenna, winning the national championship in 1983. In 1988, she led Valur to victory in the Icelandic Cup, scoring a game high 8 goals in Valur's 25–20 cup finals win against Stjarnan. She played her last six seasons with ZMC Amicitia Zürich in Switzerland. She retired from handball in 1995 but made a brief comeback with Amicitia during the 1996 playoffs before retiring for good.

=== National team career ===
She played 98 games for the Icelandic national handball team, scoring 148 goals.

=== Titles and awards ===
==== Titles ====
- Icelandic Championships:

- 1983

- Icelandic Cup:

- 1988

==== Individual awards ====
- Úrvalsdeild kvenna Defender of the Year:

- 1988
