= Erna Auerbach =

German-born artist and art historian

- Born: 1897; Frankfurt, German Empire
- Died: 1975 (aged 77–78); London, England, United Kingdom
- Education: Courtauld Institute
- Known for: Art History, Painting

Erna Auerbach (1897 – 1975) was a German-born artist and art historian best known for her work on artists of the Tudor-era in England.

== Early life and education ==
She was the daughter of the painter Emma Kehrmann (1867–1958) and her father Ernst (1861-1926) was a College teacher that helped to introduce civics into the curriculum.

She studied art history at the universities of Frankfurt, Bonn and Munich, under Rudolf Kautzsch, who supervised her doctorate, and Heinrich Wölfflin. While there she was also taught by the philosopher Hans Cornelius, the classical archaeologist Hans Schrader, and Georg Swarzenski, the director of the Städel Art Institute. Her doctorate was on German portrait painting in the 16th century, but she trained as a painter after taking her doctorate. She attended classes by Johannes Cissarz, and Willi Baumeister and spent time in 1926 in Paris.

Her first solo exhibition took place in the Ludwig Schames gallery in 1925, and she also showed in group exhibitions in the Frankfurter Künstlerbund, and the “Women represented by women” exhibition in 1930. During this time she also taught evening classes at the Frankfurt Volksbildungsheim as well as other art schools. However, the increasing control of the national socialist government made it harder and harder for her to teach and exhibit. She left to for London in 1933 becoming what would later be described as an artist of a "lost generation", those who had established themselves in the Germany art scene, but later fled Germany after the rise of national socialism, and struggled to find their feet in their new adopted homelands.

She exhibited in Germany and, after emigrating to England in 1933 (her family was Jewish), in her new home as well. When her studio was destroyed in World War II, she returned to art history.

She studied at the Courtauld Institute in London after the war, focusing on the artists of the Tudor court, and wrote a second dissertation on patronage and painting in 16th-century England. This would become the subject of her first published book, Tudor Artists (1954), the first work in modern times to lay out the documentary sources for the arts of painting and limning in the Tudor and Elizabethan periods.

She died in London in 1975.

== Publications ==
- Tudor Artists: A Study of Painters in the Royal Service and of Portraiture on Illuminated Documents from the Accession of Henry VIII to the Death of Elizabeth I, Athlone, 1954
- Nicholas Hilliard, Routledge & Kegan Paul, 1961
- Paintings and Sculpture at Hatfield House, Constable, 1971, ISBN 978-0094576407
