= Martin Abendroth =

German opera singer (1883–1977)

Martin Abendroth (4 October 1883 – 14 December 1977) was a German opera singer (bass-baritone) and voice teacher.

== Life and career ==
Abendroth was trained in Berlin where he was born. In 1906 he made his debut at the Stadttheater Königsberg. Afterwards he sang at the Stadttheater of Krefeld, the Wrocław Opera, the Staatstheater Wiesbaden and from 1925 at the Staatsoper Unter den Linden in Berlin. He created the role of the Doctor in Alban Berg's Wozzeck on 14 December 1925, conducted by Erich Kleiber, with Leo Schützendorf in the title role.

From 1927 to 1931 he was also a member of the Berliner Krolloper. At the opening of the house on 19 November 1927, he appeared as Rocco in Beethoven's Fidelio. He took part in the first staged performance of Stravinsky's Oedipus Rex, conducted by Otto Klemperer. In 1929, he appeared at the Sopot Festival at the Forest Opera as Pogner in Wagner's Die Meistersinger von Nürnberg.

He also appeared as a concert and lieder singer. He was married to the soprano Marianne Keiler, who worked in Mannheim, Breslau and Wuppertal. Abendroth die in Neuenhagen bei Berlin.

He recorded arias of Sarastro from Mozart's Die Zauberflöte in 1928.
