= Irene Abendroth =

Operatic soprano

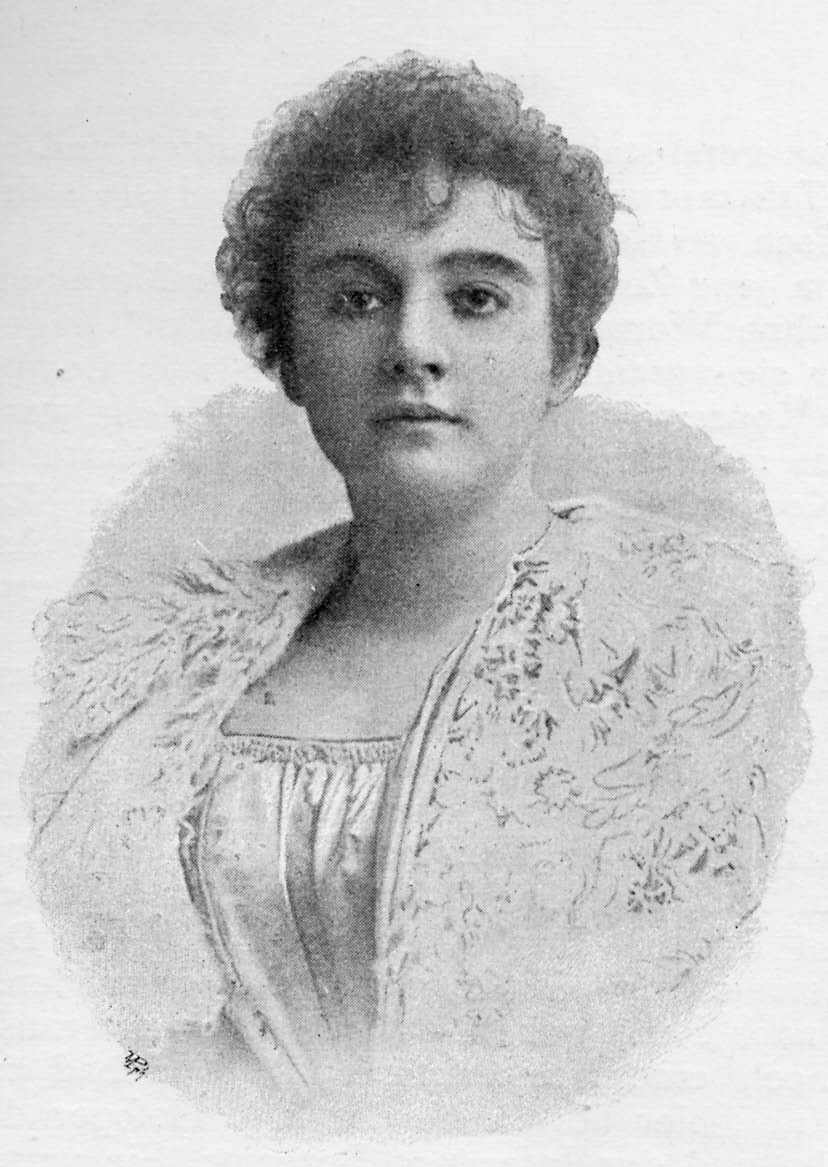
- Born: Irene Thaller von Draga; July 14, 1872; Lemberg, Austro-Hungarian Empire (present day Ukraine)
- Died: September 1, 1932 (aged 60); Weidling, Tulln District, Austria
- Occupation: Opera singer

Irene Abendroth, born as Irene Thaller von Draga (14 July 1872 – 1 September 1932) was an Austrian-Polish coloratura soprano singer. She was a pupil of Frau Wilczek. She was a member of the Vienna court opera in 1889, and she sang in Riga and Munich, and again in Vienna (1894-99). She was engaged from 1899 to 1908 at the Royal Opera in Dresden.

Her debut in March 1889 at "barely seventeen" as La sonnambula in Vienna, was critiqued as "extraordinary brilliancy of execution, in the best Italian manner, in smooth as well in staccato passages ...her voice is very thin" and she was given a distinctly favorable reception by the audience. Following this performance, the Imperial Opera put "the youthful bravura singer" on trial for one year.

== Repertoire ==
- Vincenzo Bellini
  - Norma (Adalgisa)
  - Norma (Norma)
  - La sonnambula (Amina)
- Gaetano Donizetti
  - Lucia di Lammermoor (Lucia)
- Friedrich von Flotow
  - Martha (Martha)
- Christoph Willibald Gluck
  - Alceste (Alceste)
- Karl Goldmark
  - Das Heimchen am Herd (Dot)
- Ruggiero Leoncavallo
  - I Pagliacci (Nedda)
- Albert Lortzing
  - Der Wildschütz (Baronin Freimann)
- Giacomo Meyerbeer
  - Robert le diable (Isabella)
  - Les Huguenots (Marguerite de Valois)
  - L'Africaine (Selika)
- Wolfgang Amadeus Mozart
  - Le nozze di Figaro (Susanna)
  - Le nozze di Figaro (Gräfin)
  - Don Giovanni (Donna Anna)
  - Don Giovanni (Donna Elvira)
  - Die Entführung aus dem Serail (Konstanze)
  - Die Zauberflöte (Königin der Nacht)
- Otto Nicolai
  - Die lustigen Weiber von Windsor (Frau Fluth)
- Giacomo Puccini
  - Tosca (Tosca)
- Gioachino Rossini
  - The Barber of Seville (Rosina)
- Ambroise Thomas
  - Mignon (Mignon)
- Giuseppe Verdi
  - Falstaff (Alice Ford)
  - Un ballo in maschera (Amelia)
  - Otello (Desdemona)
  - Rigoletto (Gilda)
  - La traviata (Traviata)
  - Il trovatore (Leonora)
- Carl Maria von Weber
  - Oberon (Rezia)
