= Alarm Distress Baby Scale =

Screening tool for healthcare practitioners

The Alarm Distress Baby Scale (also known as ADBB Screening) is a validated medical scoring tool for healthcare practitioners to identify infant social withdrawal. It was developed in 2001 by Antoine Guedeney and Jacques Fermanian in 2001. The tool detects social withdrawal in infants using eight-item observer-rated scale; a five-item scale has also been developed.

In 2025, it was announced that Catherine, Princess of Wales, who had seen a demonstration of the ADBB in Denmark in 2022, would be expanding the use of the ADBB in the UK through her Royal Foundation Centre for Early Childhood on a trial basis at NHS sites.

== See also ==
- Attachment theory
