= Abendroth & Root Manufacturing Co =

Defunct American motor vehicle manufacturer

Coordinates: 41.518808°N 74.007463°W

Abendroth & Root Manufacturing Company
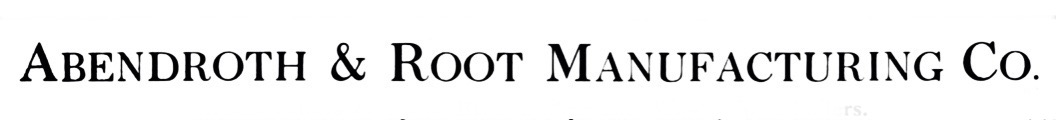
- Type: Truck Company
- Industry: Manufacturing
- Founded: 1906; 120 years ago
- Defunct: 1912; 114 years ago
- Successor: A&R (1912-1915)
- Headquarters: Newburgh, New York, US
- Products: Trucks

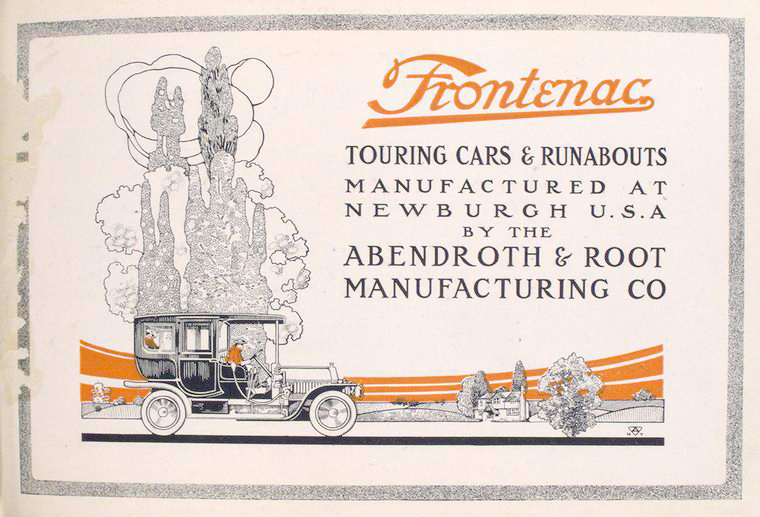
Frontenac Touring cars and Runabouts

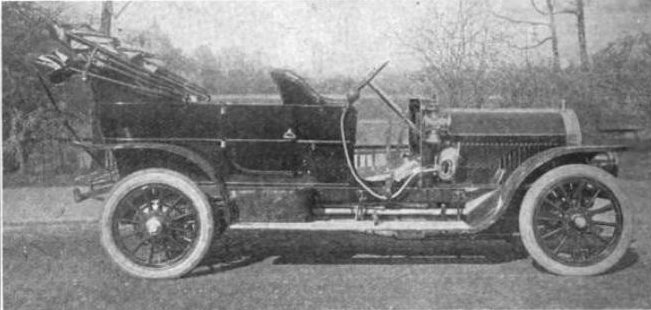
1909 Frontenac

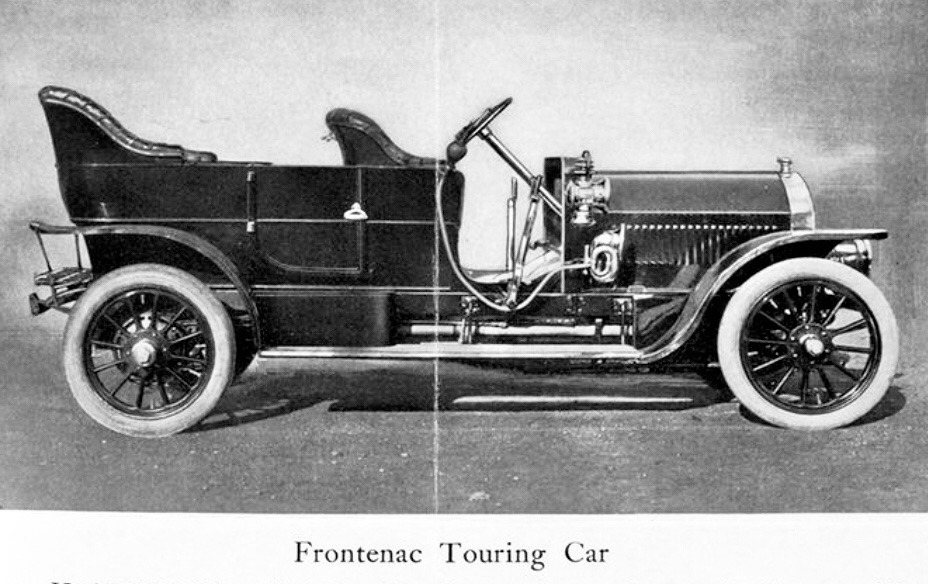
Frontenac Model C (1907) 5808 cc

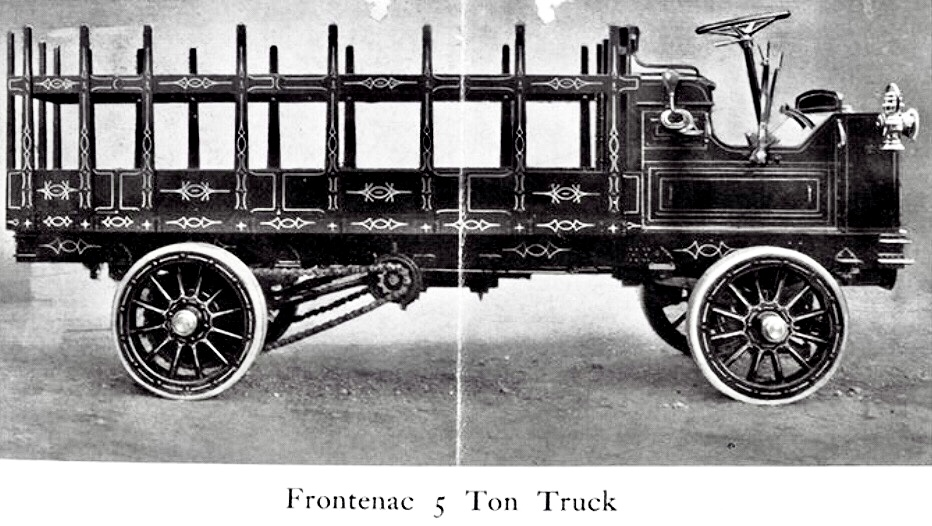
Frontenac Model F (1907) 60 HP

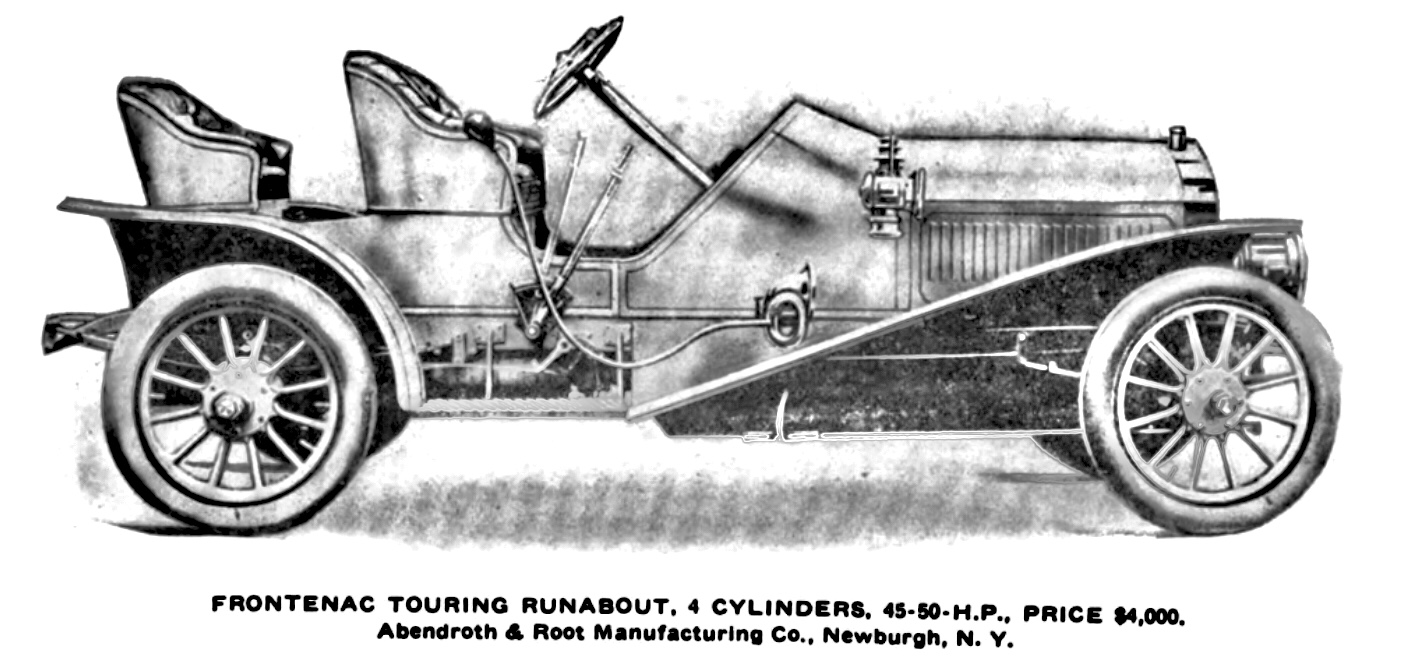
Frontenac Touring Runabout (1908)

Abendroth & Root Manufacturing Company was an American manufacturer of water heaters, water tanks and other sanitation equipment, and later, automobiles.

The company was founded in Newburgh, New York, in 1866. It was known for manufacturing the Root Water Tube Boiler and was noted for supplying the Philadelphia Edison Electric Light Company with 3,500 horsepower of boilers. It entered the automobile business in 1906. Using the name Frontenac, (Note: No relation to the Frontenac Motor Corporation.) they catered to the upper middle class, featuring large-displacement four-cylinder engines. Only twelve were built in the first year of production.

Annual production peaked at 100 vehicles in 1907, and declined from there until production ended in 1913. Variations of manufactured vehicles included the roundabout, the touring car, the limousine, and a truck named the Model F. The car models had the designations C, D, and E. The technical specifications were almost the same; only the bodies differed. The touring car had seven seats. The wheelbase was 124 inches = 3150 mm. The four-cylinder engine had a displacement of 5808 cc with a bore of 120.65 mm and a stroke of 127 mm. The engine output was between 40 and 45 HP. The tank content was 20 gallons = 75.7 liters. The truck Model F was available as 3t and as 5t. The wheelbase was 126.5 inches = 3213 mm. The four-cylinder engine, originally with 40 hp, was increased to 60 hp for the 5t. As a result of the decline in production, the company abandoned the effort and returned to their original business. The factory was located at the foot of Park Place.
