= Erna Frins =

Physicist from Uruguay

- Born: Erna Martha Frins Pereira; 31 December 1960 (age 65); Paysandú, Uruguay
- Education: Goethe University Frankfurt
- Occupations: Physicist, professor, researcher
- Awards: L'Oréal-UNESCO Award

Erna Martha Frins Pereira (born 31 December 1960) is a Uruguayan physicist. She works as a professor and researcher at the University of the Republic. She was president of the Uruguayan Physics Society from 2007 to 2011. In 2012 she won the National L'Oréal-UNESCO Award for Women in Science for her research in environmental physics.

== Career ==
Between 1979 and 1986, Frins studied chemistry and physics at the University of the Republic. In 1992 she obtained a master's degree in physics from Technische Universität Berlin, Germany, with a thesis on the properties of solid state tuneable lasers. In 1992 she joined the Institute of Physics of the University of the Republic's Faculty of Engineering. In 1998 she completed her PhD in sciences with a specialization in physics at Goethe University Frankfurt, from the study of applications in optics of topological phases.

Beginning in 1999 she coordinated a research team focused on the development of optical methods for remote monitoring of the atmosphere at the Institute of Physics, Applied Optics Group of the University of the Republic. She is a Grade 4 Associate Professor at the Faculty of Engineering of the University of the Republic and Grade 4 researcher of the Programa de Desarrollo de las Ciencias Básicas (PEDECIBA). Since 2004 she has been an active member of the National System of Researchers of Uruguay.

Frins was president of the Uruguayan Physics Society for two consecutive periods between 2007 and 2011.

In 2012 she won the National L'Oréal-UNESCO Award for Women in Science, for her project "Métodos ópticos para el estudio de emisiones gaseosas generadas en la operación de centrales térmicas". The project focuses on the development of an optical method for the study of gas emissions in thermal power plants. The technology allows the location of gases that pollute the atmosphere, placing them at specific coordinates.

Frins has carried out numerous research projects in different scientific areas, and has more than 60 publications in scientific media.
