= Erna Weill =

American sculptor

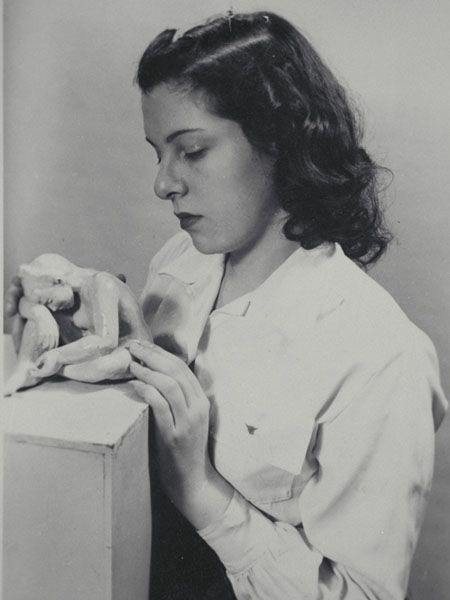
Erna Weill

Erna Weill (1904-1996) was an American German-Jewish sculptor known for her busts of 20th-century persons, in particular civil rights figures.

Born Erna Helft in Frankfurt, Germany, she studied sculpture with Helene von Beckerath, a student of Auguste Rodin, at Goethe University Frankfurt. In 1933, a course with Martin Buber in Frankfurt inspired her to pursue Jewish themes in her work. She married a chemist, Ernst Weill.

In 1936, the family fled Germany first to Switzerland and then to the United States, settling eventually in Teaneck, New Jersey. She continued her work of busts of famous people, many from the Civil Rights Movement and of Jewish themes. In addition she taught in New York City public schools and had her own art school.
