= Eamon McCrory =

Clinical psychologist

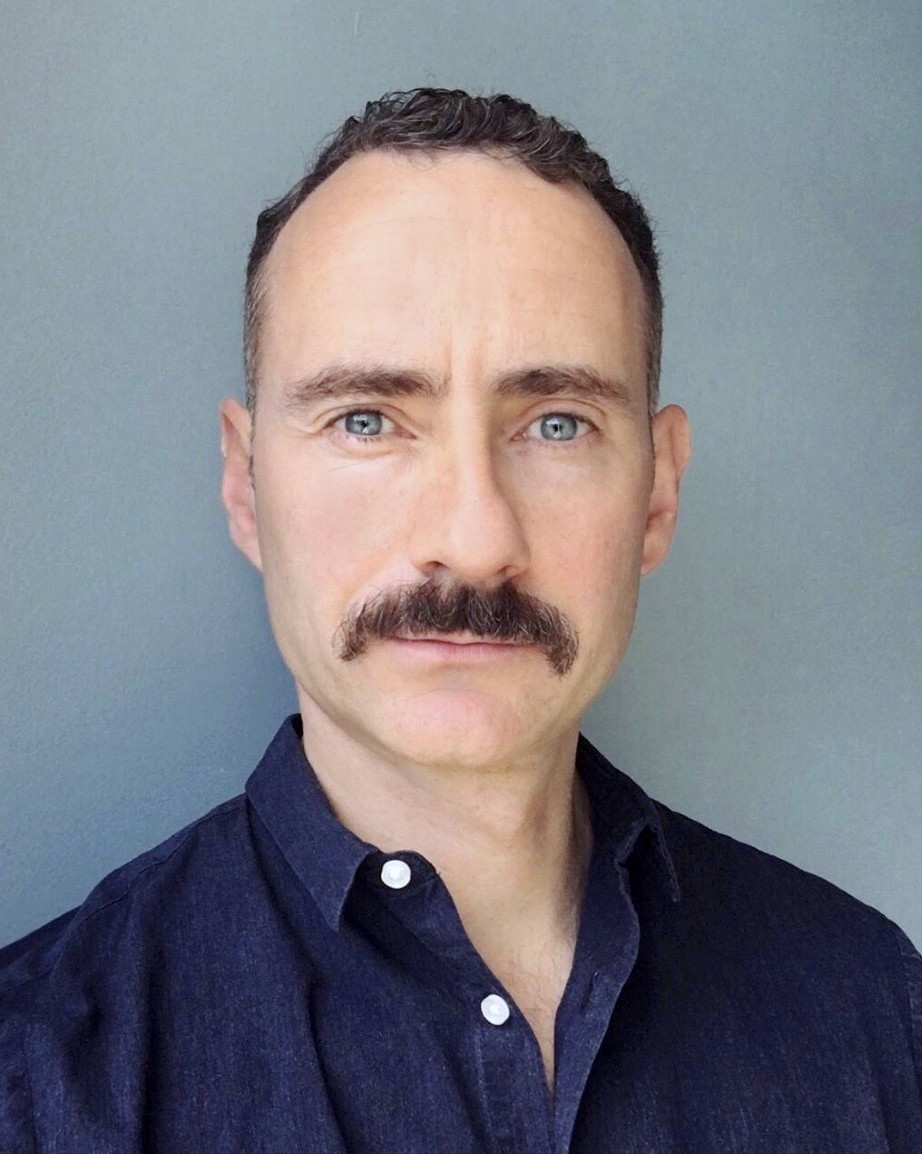
- Born: Belfast, Northern Ireland
- Occupations: Scientist, psychologist and author

Academic background
- Education: B.A. (1995); Ph.D. (2002); Clinical Doctorate (2004)
- Alma mater: University of Cambridge; University College London; King's College London

Academic work
- Institutions: University College London; Anna Freud

Eamon Joseph McCrory is a London-based scientist and clinical psychologist. He is Professor of Developmental Neuroscience and Psychopathology at University College London, where he Co-Directs the Developmental Risk and Resilience Unit. He is the current Chief Executive of The Anna Freud Centre and co-founder of the UK Trauma Council.

He is best known for his work investigating how changes in the brain during childhood can shed light on the link between adversity and mental health.

== Education ==
McCrory was born in Belfast where he attended De La Salle College. He then gained a place at Queens' College, Cambridge earning a double first in the Natural Sciences Tripos in 1995. McCrory then moved to University College London to work with Uta Frith and Cathy J. Price obtaining his Ph.D. in cognitive neuroscience in 2002. Subsequently, he undertook clinical training at King's College London, obtaining his Doctorate in Clinical Psychology in 2004.

== Career ==
After completing his PhD, McCrory trained as a clinical psychologist and began therapeutic work within the NHS and NSPCC, focusing on children and adolescents with complex presentations who had experienced significant trauma. He joined University College London as a lecturer in 2006, where he established the MRes in Developmental Neuroscience and Psychopathology, in collaboration with Linda Mayes at the Child Study Centre, Yale University. He also created the Developmental Risk and Resilience Unit, a collaborative research team focusing on developmental disorders, with Essi Viding in 2008. He became professor of developmental neuroscience and psychopathology at University College London in 2014.

In 2018, McCrory co-founded the UK Trauma Council, an initiative that brings together expertise from across all four nations to improve outcomes for children and young people. In 2019, he was appointed to the Executive leadership team at Anna Freud, a leading UK charity for child mental health. He was appointed as Chief Executive Officer on 1 September 2024.

From 2020 - 2023, McCrory was director of the UK Research and Innovation (UKRI) programme in Adolescent Mental Health and Wellbeing. In this capacity he was responsible for investing £35 million in research and wider initiatives to improve the lives of young people in the UK. McCrory currently serves on a number of advisory committees including for the Nuffield Family Justice Observatory. He is also a member of the Royal Foundation's Expert Advisory Group on Early Years, and in this capacity hosted a visit by the Princess of Wales to UCL in 2018.

=== Research ===
McCrory is best known for his work on childhood adversity, maltreatment and the brain. He is interested in why mental health problems develop, and has investigated how childhood trauma can impact brain structure and function in ways that may lead to an increased risk of later psychiatric disorder.

He has argued that alterations in brain structure and function, associated with childhood maltreatment, may in part represent adaptation to early dangerous or unpredictable environments. His short animation summarising what we know about the neuroscience of trauma has had over 3 million views on YouTube.

In his theory of Latent Vulnerability, developed with Essi Viding, he argues that while neurocognitive adaptations may confer benefits for the child in early adverse environments they can create increased vulnerability in the longer term, as the child becomes less well equipped to successfully negotiate more normative environments and developmental challenges. His research has documented altered functioning in an array of neurocognitive systems, including the threat, reward and autobiographical memory systems. McCrory's call for a greater focus on preventative approaches to child mental health has in part been informed by his finding that altered brain functioning following trauma is observable even before mental health problems emerge.

He has recently argued for the importance of viewing the brain as a social organ, claiming that mental health vulnerability following childhood maltreatment can in part be understood as a socially mediated process. His neurocognitive social transactional model that proposes that alterations in core neurocognitive systems, including those involved in threat, reward, trust and autobiographical memory processing can shape how individuals build their social architecture over time. The model emphasises interactive and autocatalytic social processes, which can gradually impoverish an individual’s actual or potential social environment and ultimately increase mental health risk. These processes include "social thinning" (reduction in the quality / number of affiliative or supportive relationships) and “stress generation” (more frequent interpersonal stressor events) following experiences of complex trauma or maltreatment.

== Selected articles ==
- McCrory, E. J., De Brito, S. A., Sebastian, C. L., Mechelli, A., Bird, G., Kelly, P. A., Viding, E. (2011). Heightened neural reactivity to threat in child victims of family violence. Current Biology 21(23), R947-R948.
- McCrory, E.J., Gerin, M.I. and Viding, E., 2017. Annual Research Review: Childhood maltreatment, latent vulnerability and the shift to preventative psychiatry–the contribution of functional brain imaging. Journal of Child Psychology and Psychiatry, 58(4), pp. 338–357.
- McCrory, E.J., Puetz, V.B., Maguire, E.A., Mechelli, A., Palmer, A., Gerin, M.I., Kelly, P.A., Koutoufa, I. and Viding, E., 2017. Autobiographical memory: a candidate latent vulnerability mechanism for psychiatric disorder following childhood maltreatment. The British Journal of Psychiatry, 212(4) 216-222.
- McCrory, E., Foulkes, L., & Viding, E. (2022). Social thinning and stress generation after childhood maltreatment: A neurocognitive social transactional model of psychiatric vulnerability. The Lancet Psychiatry, 9(10), 828-837
