= Erna Schillig =

- Erna Schillig c. 1945
- Born: 27 September 1900; Altdorf, Switzerland
- Died: 1 May 1993 (aged 92); Altdorf, Switzerland
- Known for: Painting, Textile arts
- Partner: August Babberger

Erna Schillig (1900–1993) was a Swiss artist. As well as being is considered a pioneer of modern Central Swiss textile art, she is known for her murals in plaster technique, sgraffito, and mosaic.

== Biography ==
Schillig was born in Altdorf, Uri, Switzerland on 27 September 1900.

In the mid-1920s she belonged to the "Urner Kreis", which formed around the German Expressionist artist de:August Babberger.

From 1927 to 1930 she attended the Academy of Fine Arts, Karlsruhe studying decorative painting and wall painting.

In 1932, she and August Babberger painted the Höfli Chapel in Altdorf, Switzerland.

One of her Trachtenteppich (traditional carpet) was exhibited at the 1937 Exposition Internationale des Arts et Techniques dans la Vie Moderne in Paris.

From 1937 to 1941, she obtained further training with Ernst Morgenthaler in Zurich, Switzerland, and in 1942 she studied with de:Albert Schnyder in Delémont, Switzerland.

From 1946 to 1967, Schillig was head of the textile department at the Kunstgewerbeschule (School of Applied Arts) in Lucerne.

Schillig died on 1 May 1993 in Altdorf.
