= Angelika Schaser =

German historian (born 1956)

Angelika Schaser (born 1956) is a German historian.

== Life and career ==
Born in Munich, Schaser studied history, geography and library science in Munich and Berlin. In 1985, she became a research assistant to Ilja Mieck at the Friedrich Meinecke Institute of Freie Universität Berlin. In 1987, she received her doctorate from the FU Berlin with the thesis Josephinian Reforms and Social Change in Transylvania. Her doctoral supervisor was Mathias Bernath. The topic was suggested by Harald Zimmermann. In 1999, she habilitated at the FU Berlin with the thesis Helene Lange and Gertrud Bäumer. A Political Life Community. In 2000, she received the Wolf-Erich-Kellner-Prize for her habilitation thesis. After her habilitation, she was a senior assistant at the Friedrich Meinecke Institute.

Since 2001, Schaser has succeeded Bernd Jürgen Wendt as Professor of New History at the University of Hamburg. Schaser's main areas of research and teaching include religion and society in the 19th century, the German Empire and the Weimar Republic, the history of historiography, self-testimonies of the early modern and modern periods as sources of historical scholarship, and the history of the women's movement in Germany (1865-1933). Through Schaser, the University of Hamburg developed into a recognised centre for women's and gender studies. From 2004 to 2010, Schaser was a member of the DFG research group "Selbstzeugnisse in transkultureller Perspektive" (Self-testimonies in transcultural perspective) based at the FU Berlin; she organised numerous workshops and conferences and published essays.

Schaser is a member of the advisory board of the Stiftung Bundespräsident-Theodor-Heuss-Haus and a member of the editorial board of the Stuttgart edition (since 2003), a member of the scientific advisory board of the Forschungsstelle für Zeitgeschichte in Hamburg foundation Research Centre for Contemporary History in Hamburg (since 2010) and a lecturer of the Studienstiftung des Deutschen Volkes (since 2006). She has been a board member of the Arbeitskreis Historische Frauen- und Geschlechterforschung and was chairperson from 2007 to 2011. Schaser was a member of the board of trustees of the Wolf-Erich-Kellner-Gedächtnisstiftung until 2014.

From October 2006 to September 2007, she was executive director of the Department of History. In this function, Schaser came under public pressure in the "Hamburg Muzzle Affair". Schaser had justified the cancellation of a paid teaching assignment in writing with the fact that the person concerned had shortly before made critical comments on WDR about the situation of lecturers.

== Publications (selection) ==
Monographs

- with Gesine Carl: Anders werden? Konversionserzählungen vom 17. Jahrhundert bis zum Ersten Weltkrieg. in collaboration with Christine Schatz. Winkler, Bochum 2016, ISBN 978-3-89911-255-9.
- Der Arbeitskreis Historische Frauen- und Geschlechterforschung 1990 bis 2015. Wissenschaftliche Professionalisierung im Netzwerk. Hamburg 2015 ISBN 978-3-00-050354-2.
- Helene Lange und Gertrud Bäumer. Eine politische Lebensgemeinschaft (L’Homme-Schriften. Reihe zur feministischen Geschichtswissenschaft. Vol. 6). 2., durchgesehene und aktualisierte Auflage. Böhlau, Cologne 2010 among others ISBN 978-3-412-09100-2 (in the same time: Berlin, Freie Universität, Habilitations-Schrift, 1999).
- Frauenbewegung in Deutschland: 1848–1933. WBG, Darmstadt 2006, ISBN 3-534-15210-7.
- Josephinische Reformen und sozialer Wandel in Siebenbürgen. Die Bedeutung des Konzivilitätsreskriptes für Hermannstadt (Quellen und Studien zur Geschichte des östlichen Europa. Vol. 29). Steiner, Stuttgart 1989, ISBN 3-515-05069-8 (in the same time: Berlin, FU, Dissertation, 1986).

Editorships

- with Sylvia Schraut, Petra Steymans-Kurz: Erinnern, vergessen, umdeuten? Europäische Frauenbewegungen im 19. und 20. Jahrhundert (Geschichte und Geschlechter. Bd. 73). Campus Verlag, Frankfurt 2019, ISBN 978-3-593-51033-0.
- with Claudia Ulbrich, Hans Medick: Selbstzeugnis und Person. Transkulturelle Perspektiven (Selbstzeugnisse der Neuzeit. vol. 20). Böhlau, Cologne 2012, ISBN 978-3-412-20853-0 (Review).
- with Stefanie Schüler-Springorum: Liberalismus und Emanzipation. In- und Exklusionsprozesse im Kaiserreich und in der Weimarer Republik (Wissenschaftliche Reihe. Vol. 10). Steiner, Stuttgart 2010, ISBN 978-3-515-09319-4 (Review).
