= Erna von Abendroth =

German nurse (1887–1959)

- Born: February 4, 1887; Ostritz, Kingdom of Saxony, German Empire
- Died: February 26, 1959 (aged 72)
- Occupations: Nurse, trainer, educator
- Years active: 1910–1951
- Known for: First German nurse to receive a PhD; post-WWII reconstruction of the Werner-Schule vom Deutschen Roten Kreuz
- Medical career
- Field: Nursing, nursing education
- Institutions: Carola Hospital (Dresden)<bt>Johannstadt Hospital (Dresden); German Red Cross (DRK); Werner-Schule vom Deutschen Roten Kreuz (Göttingen)
- Sub-specialties: Nursing administration, healthcare education
- Research: History and sociology of the nursing profession in Saxony

Erna von Abendroth (4 February 1887 – 26 February 1959) was a pioneering German nurse and trainer/teacher. After the First World War she became the first German nurse to receive a PhD degree in return for a dissertation with a nursing theme. After the Second World War, starting in May 1946 she took charge of the reconstruction of the {{ill|"Otto Werner" Red Cross Nursing Academy|de|Werner-Schule vom Deutschen Roten Kreuz\\ at Göttingen.

== Life ==
Erna von Abendroth was born in Ostritz, a small town located to the south of Görlitz and directly on the frontier with Bohemia. Alexander Bernhard Ernst von Abendroth (1853-), her father, was a cavalry officer. She attended school locally and then spent five years studying at a teacher training college in Dresden. She concluded her studies, passing the necessary exams, in 1906. she then worked as a home tutor. In 1910 she completed a nursing training with the Red Cross Albertines at the Carola Hospital in Dresden. During the First World War, which broke out in July 1914, she served as a volunteer nurse, and in 1916 passed the exams needed to become a fully qualified nurse. This did not put an end to her studies, however.

War ended in 1918 and she took on the care of her parents. She also took time to attend lectures at the Technische Hochschule Dresden and at Leipzig University. In 1921 she was awarded a doctorate for a dissertation on "the nursing profession with a particular focus on the context in Saxony" ("Der Beruf der Krankenpflegerin mit besonderer Berücksichtigung der sächsischen Verhältnisse"). Rather than embarking on an academic life, however, she persisted with her nursing career. She was a co-founder of the "Dresden City Sisterhood" during 1922/23, becoming matron of this Red Cross sponsored organisation in 1923. In 1924 she called for the creation of a permanent "Saxony Matrons' Conference" to provide advice on health care administration and nursing.

Between 1927 and 1929 she held the appointment of chair of the "[Matrons'] Sisterhood" Johannstadt Hospital in Dresden, which made her an influential voice in establishing the nursing academy there. In Dresden von Abendroth was involved in the education of many cohorts of nurses who later would remember her with great affection. The hospital and nursing academy were closed down in 1932, however, as the Great Depression continued to take its toll of public services. Erna von Abendroth now left Dresden and embarked on the first of several lengthy lecture and study tours abroad. Her travels included Sweden and the United States of America.

=== Third Reich ===
There was a change of government in January 1933. The authorities now lost no time in transforming Germany into a one-party dictatorship. Through a combination of deficit financing and the pendulum of the economic cycle, it became possible to re-open the hospital and nursing academy in 1934. In keeping with the spirit of the times, the institution now had an uplifting new name. The "Rudolf Hess Hospital" became home to the "Brown sisters" - nurses committed to the Nazi ideas. Headship of the newly reopened nursing academy went to Amalie Rau, a committed party supporter. There is no suggestion that Erna von Abendroth was either a Communist nor Jewish, but nor was she an admirer, far less a member, of the Nazi Party. To work as a nurse in Nazi Germany seems to have required, formally or informally, membership of the "National Socialist sisterhood" ("NS-Schwesternschaft"). It appears to have been the pressures of war, which returned in the summer of 1939, that drew von Abendroth back to public sector nursing two years later.

In 1941 she joined the German Red Cross and its "Sisterhood for Abroad" ("Schwesternschaft für Übersee") which was headquartered in Berlin. She worked as a red cross matron in various locations including Berlin, Halle, Essen, Wiesbaden, Metz and Strasbourg. It was in Strasbourg that she was captured by the Americans early in 1945, becoming briefly a prisoner of war. After she was released she was working as a nurse in the Dresden quarter of Radebeul where she had found a refuge of sorts during the devastating air attacks of February and March on the city centre.

=== Post-war ===
In May 1946 Erna von Abenroth took over the leadership of the "Otto Werner" Red Cross Nursing Academy which was now reconstructed at the organisation's site in Göttingen, replacing an equivalent institution in Berlin that had been destroyed in the war. She worked at the academy in Göttingen till her retirement in 1951.

The nursing academy in Dresden that she had established back in the 1920s came under the control of the Trades Union Federation [nursing] sisterhood established in the Soviet occupation zone in 1947. It served as a training school for senior nurses and, after 1951 (by which time the Soviet occupation zone had been relaunched as the German Democratic Republic) as a nursing academy for medical students.
