= Erna Furman =

American psychologist

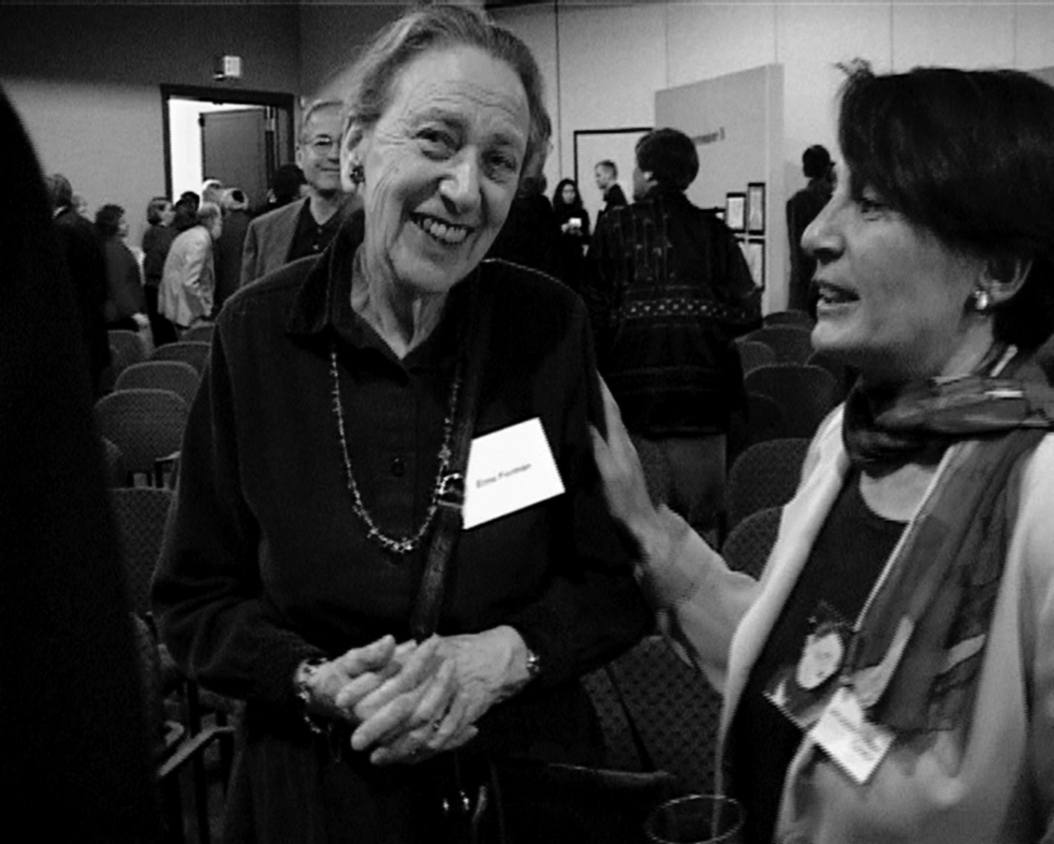
- Born: Erna Mary Popper; June 14, 1926; Vienna, Austria
- Died: August 9, 2002 (aged 76)
- Occupation: Psychologist

Erna Furman (born Erna Mary Popper June 14, 1926 – August 9, 2002) was an Austrian-born American child psychoanalyst, psychologist, and teacher.

== Biography ==
Furman was born Erna Mary Popper in Vienna to a Jewish family. She was educated at the Academy of Commerce in Prague. As a little girl she had been to Montessori nursery school in Vienna. In 1938, when she was twelve years old, Nazi Germany annexed Austria. Her family, having Czech citizenship, fled to Czechoslovakia to escape the Nazis. This move provided only temporary safety. In spring 1939 her father left for Belgium and England. They were to meet again only at the end of the summer of 1946.

In October 1942, Furman and her mother were sent to the Theresienstadt concentration camp, near Prague. Her aunts and grandmother would later be sent to the same concentration camp. While there, she was twice put on the list for transportation to Auschwitz. Both times she managed to have her name to be removed from that list. In January 1943, she asked the Jewish Elder to take her out of the transport. Edelstein took her out of the transport because her mother had died that morning and she'd acquired a different status due to her mother's death.

She came to Theresienstadt from Prague in October 1942, and left in May 1945 (when the Red Army liberated it), from age 16 to almost 19 years, and worked the entire time as 'Betreuerin' (caregiver) in a children's home, L 318. L 318 was one of the orphan houses in the ghetto. Later in 1945 in Olesovice - in the Premysl Pitter, Children's Rehabilitation Center, situated in a castle of baron von Ringhoffer not far from Prague - she was a tutor for a group of children who survived Terezin and other camps.

In 1945 Anna Freud took a small group of Terezin children to England, they were taken care of under Anna Freud's supervision. Some of the children's recollections were published with their permission. Anna Freud has written an article about them, and Gyömrői has written an analysis of one of the children survivors. At that time Anna Freud often called Erna Furman to ask her about things that came up with the children from camp, hoping that Erna could clarify them.

Erna Furman's Terezin drawings were demonstrated at the Friedl Dicker-Brandeis's exhibit series in Japan in April–October 2002. They were included in the exhibit and on display for the first time, the drawings and diaries of Erna Furman, "a survivor of Terezin and pupil of Friedl." Her materials were taken in a special corner of the exhibition, called 'Erna's Room'. She and Friedl Dicker-Brandeis had been close friends when they were both interned in the ghetto of Terezin during the Second World War.

A graduate of the Child Therapy Training Program offered by Anna Freud in Hampstead following World War II, Erna Furman was a child psychoanalyst, a licensed psychologist, and a teacher. She emigrated to the United States with the help of Anny Katan-Rosenberg in the 1950s.

She married Robert Furman, had two daughters, Lydia and Tanya, and lived in Cleveland, Ohio with her husband. Both were prominent and respected psychoanalysts. Erna Furman specialized in children and how children process grief. Of particular importance was her evidence that children as young as three essentially process grief no differently from adults and her insistence that children not be misled or deceived when a parent dies. She wrote:

In all bereavement, it is extraordinarily important that all of the realities of the death be known and appreciated by the survivor, particularly the cause of the death.

She practiced at the Hanna Perkins Center for Child Development and also saw patients in her Cleveland Heights home. She was a prolific writer; over the years she received extensive accolades for her contributions to psychoanalysis. She was made an honorary member of the American Psychoanalytic Association in 1999.

Erna Furman and her husband Robert both died in 2002, one month apart. Erna Furman died on August 9 (aged 76) and Robert Furman died on September 21.

== Quotes by Erna Furman ==
You can say that I grew up in Vienna, I grew up in Prague, and I grew up in Terezin. Those were my ways of growing up. Coping with life. Not overwhelmed by the holocaust but deeply affected by it.

— (E.F.)

I knew how to find the good in people, but I certainly understood the other side.

== Published work ==
- A Child's Parent Dies. Studies in Childhood Bereavement (1974)
- What Nursery School Teachers Ask Us About: Psychoanalytic Consultations in Preschools (Emotions and Behavior Monographs) (1986)
- The teacher's guide to Helping young children grow: The Teacher's Manual (1987)
- Helping Young Children Grow: I Never Knew Parents Did So Much (1988)
- Toddlers and Their Mothers: A Study in Early Personality Development (1992)
- Toddlers and Their Mothers: Abridged Version for Parents and Educators (1993)
- Preschoolers: Questions and Answers: Psychoanalytic Consultations With Parents, Teachers, and Caregivers (1995)
- Needs, Urges and Feelings in Early Childhood: Helping Young Children Grow (1997)
- Relationships in Early Childhood: Helping Young Children Grow (1998)
- Self-Control and Mastery in Early Childhood: Helping Young Children Grow (1998)
- On Being and Having a Mother (2001), a collection of papers written by Erna Furman collecting her various papers on mothering into one volume.
