= Agricultural Development Bank of Trinidad and Tobago =

Development finance institution

- Company type: Public
- Industry: finance
- Predecessor: Agricultural Credit Bank
- Founded: January 25, 1968; 58 years ago
- Founder: Government of Trinidad and Tobago

The Agricultural Development Bank of Trinidad and Tobago is a development finance institution which provides financial services to the agricultural sector of Trinidad and Tobago and the Caribbean. The bank was founded in 1968 by the government of Trinidad and Tobago to replace the colonial-era Agricultural Credit Bank that preceded it.

As of 2007, the bank claimed to have issued US$500 million, or 40,000 loans since its founding. Most of the source money for the bank came from the Inter American Development Bank (IADB) and the Caribbean Development Bank. Since a change in the banking sector, where commercial banks stopped loaning money to agriculture in the early 2000s, the bank has been the primary source of finance for the agricultural sector of Trinidad and Tobago.

A 2007 analysis of the work of the bank found that, though effective in its focus on a specific sector, its effectiveness relied on rebranding itself, marketing, and getting political support. At the time of the report, the author recommended that the bank expand services beyond lending money to the agricultural sector.
