= 2012 European Women's Handball Championship squads =

The following is a list of squads for each nation competing at the 2012 European Women's Handball Championship in Serbia.

On 5 November 2012, the official squad lists were announced and published. Of those 28-player squads, 16 were named for the final tournament.

On 4 December 2012, the official rosters were announced and published.

Caps and goals correct as of 4 December 2012.

== Group A ==
=== Czech Republic ===
Head coach: Jan Bašný

No.	Pos.	Name	Date of birth (age)	Height	App.	Goals	Club
3	RW	Jana Knedlíková	22 June 1989 (aged 23)	1.67 m	28	55	(Czech Republic) Slavia Prague
5	CB	Kateřina Keclíková	26 June 1986 (aged 26)	1.71 m	27	39	(Czech Republic) Slavia Prague
7	LW	Romana Chrenková	30 June 1987 (aged 25)	1.66 m	62	210	(Czech Republic) Sokol Poruba
8	LB	Pavla Poznarová	26 September 1986 (aged 26)	1.81 m	83	182	(Czech Republic) Sokol Poruba
9	LW	Kristýna Salčáková	13 August 1987 (aged 25)	1.65 m	47	61	(Czech Republic) HC Veselí
10	CB	Petra Růčková	8 February 1989 (aged 23)	1.74 m	53	34	(Czech Republic) Baník Most
11	CB	Hana Kutlvašrová	28 September 1989 (aged 23)	1.80 m	29	25	(Czech Republic) Slavia Prague
12	GK	Barbora Raníková	12 March 1985 (aged 27)	1.81 m	55	0	(Czech Republic) Zora Olomouc
13	RB	Klára Černá	29 January 1985 (aged 27)	1.74 m	48	149	(Czech Republic) Slavia Prague
14	P	Petra Vítková	18 August 1979 (aged 33)	1.76 m	189	314	(Czech Republic) Baník Most
15	RW	Michaela Hrbková	14 July 1987 (aged 25)	1.70 m	67	122	(Czech Republic) Sokol Poruba
16	GK	Lucie Satrapová	3 July 1989 (aged 23)	1.83 m	30	0	(Czech Republic) Slavia Prague
17	LB	Hana Martínková	16 September 1985 (aged 27)	1.90 m	28	94	(Czech Republic) Baník Most
18	CB	Iveta Luzumová	3 April 1989 (aged 23)	1.75 m	31	82	(France) Mios Biganos
19	LB	Helena Štěrbová	5 April 1988 (aged 24)	1.80 m	28	66	(Czech Republic) HC Veselí
24	P	Dominika Selucká	13 December 1987 (aged 24)	1.75 m	14	9	(Czech Republic) Sokol Poruba
29	P	Iveta Matoušková	5 January 1987 (aged 25)	1.87 m	8	1	(Poland) Start Elbląg

=== Norway ===
Head coach: Thorir Hergeirsson

No.	Pos.	Name	Date of birth (age)	Height	App.	Goals	Club
3	LB	Karoline Næss	24 July 1987 (aged 25)	1.82 m	23	8	(Norway) Stabæk IF
4	CB	Stine Bredal Oftedal	25 September 1991 (aged 21)	1.68 m	43	53	(Norway) Stabæk IF
5	LB	Ida Alstad	13 June 1985 (aged 27)	1.72 m	76	183	(Norway) Byåsen HE
6	P	Heidi Løke	12 December 1982 (aged 29)	1.77 m	104	342	(Hungary) Győri Audi ETO KC
8	CB	Karoline Dyhre Breivang	10 May 1980 (aged 32)	1.72 m	257	421	(Norway) Larvik HK
9	LB	Kristine Lunde-Borgersen	30 March 1980 (aged 32)	1.83 m	170	484	(Norway) IK Våg
11	CB	Anja Edin	5 February 1983 (aged 29)	1.79 m	32	60	(Norway) Larvik HK
12	GK	Silje Solberg	16 June 1990 (aged 22)	1.78 m	8	0	(Norway) Stabæk IF
13	P	Marit Malm Frafjord	25 November 1985 (aged 27)	1.82 m	158	333	(Denmark) Viborg HK
14	RB	Ida Bjørndalen	6 May 1983 (aged 29)	1.78 m	9	7	(Denmark) KIF Kolding
15	RB	Linn Jørum Sulland	15 July 1984 (aged 28)	1.78 m	121	348	(Norway) Larvik HK
16	GK	Katrine Lunde Haraldsen	30 March 1980 (aged 32)	1.81 m	210	3	(Hungary) Győri Audi ETO KC
18	RW	Linn-Kristin Riegelhuth Koren	1 August 1984 (aged 28)	1.76 m	213	807	(Norway) Larvik HK
19	LW	Linn Gossé	25 June 1986 (aged 26)	1.70 m	5	12	(Norway) Tertnes HE
20	RW	Maja Jakobsen	28 March 1990 (aged 22)	1.72 m	3	2	(Norway) Storhamar HE
23	LW	Camilla Herrem	8 October 1986 (aged 26)	1.66 m	116	290	(Norway) Byåsen HE

=== Serbia ===
Head coach: Saša Bošković

No.	Pos.	Name	Date of birth (age)	Height	App.	Goals	Club
3	RW	Katarina Krpež	2 May 1988 (aged 24)	1.70 m	51	105	(Slovenia) RK Krim
4	RB	Jelena Popović	4 September 1984 (aged 28)	1.71 m	78	124	(France) ES Besançon
7	CB	Andrea Lekić	6 September 1987 (aged 25)	1.78 m	62	324	(Hungary) Győri Audi ETO KC
11	LB	Sanja Damnjanović	25 May 1987 (aged 25)	1.77 m	70	254	(Croatia) RK Podravka
15	LB	Jelena Erić	12 October 1979 (aged 33)	1.80 m	59	153	(Russia) HC Astrakhanochka
16	GK	Jovana Risović	7 October 1993 (aged 19)	1.71 m	2	0	(Serbia) Max Sport
17	P	Sanja Rajović	18 May 1981 (aged 31)	1.72 m	39	58	(Serbia) ŽRK Zaječar
20	P	Slađana Pop-Lazić	26 July 1988 (aged 24)	1.78 m	43	69	(France) ES Besançon
21	LW	Svetlana Ognjenović	26 January 1981 (aged 31)	1.66 m	74	160	(France) Metz Handball
26	LB	Biljana Filipović	12 January 1986 (aged 26)	1.89 m	14	29	(Turkey) Üsküdar Bld. SK
27	GK	Katarina Tomašević	6 February 1984 (aged 28)	1.79 m	43	0	(Germany) Thüringer HC
28	GK	Ana Kačarević	18 June 1984 (aged 28)	1.75 m	5	0	(Serbia) Naisa Niš
30	LW	Jelena Nišavić	27 September 1980 (aged 32)	1.68 m	75	108	(Serbia) ŽRK Zaječar
31	RW	Ivana Milošević	11 June 1982 (aged 30)	1.68 m	42	36	(Serbia) RK Jagodina
33	LB	Jovana Stoiljković	30 September 1988 (aged 24)	1.82 m	2	0	(France) Le Havre AC
71	CB	Kristina Liščević	20 October 1989 (aged 23)	1.73 m	20	23	(France) Metz Handball
99	RB	Marina Dmitrović	23 March 1985 (aged 27)	1.82 m	51	99	(North Macedonia) ŽRK Vardar

=== Ukraine ===
Head coach: Leonid Ratner

No.	Pos.	Name	Date of birth (age)	Height	App.	Goals	Club
1	GK	Maryna Vlasenko	6 October 1987 (aged 25)	1.82 m	11	0	(Russia) HC Astrakhanochka
2	RB	Olga Laiuk	17 May 1984 (aged 28)	1.82 m	43	81	(Turkey) Muraptaşa BSK
4	LB	Anastasiya Pidpalova	5 January 1982 (aged 30)	1.92 m	60	244	(Russia) Dinamo Volgograd
5	P	Iryna Shutska	5 March 1983 (aged 29)	1.80 m	70	162	(Romania) Dunărea Brăila
6	RW	Iuliia Managarova	27 September 1988 (aged 24)	1.66 m	65	221	(Romania) Oltchim Vâlcea
7	LW	Viktoriya Borshchenko	5 January 1986 (aged 26)	1.72 m	103	160	(Russia) Dinamo Volgograd
8	CB	Viktoriia Tsybulenko	31 March 1978 (aged 34)	1.78 m	35	78	(Ukraine) Karpaty Uzhhorod
9	P	Olha Vashchuk	13 August 1987 (aged 25)	1.78 m	90	35	(North Macedonia) ŽRK Metalurg
13	CB	Natalya Turkalo	25 June 1982 (aged 30)	1.75 m	9	10	(Ukraine) Karpaty Uzhhorod
16	GK	Natalia Parhomenko	21 March 1979 (aged 33)	1.80 m	32	0	(Russia) Kuban Krasnodar
17	RB	Olha Nikolayenko	5 April 1983 (aged 29)	1.78 m	45	173	(Hungary) Ferencvárosi TC
21	LW	Anna Redka	21 January 1989 (aged 23)	1.66 m	9	10	(Belarus) Universitet Gomel
22	GK	Viktoriya Tymoshenkova	4 November 1983 (aged 29)	1.83 m	528	0	(Russia) Dinamo Volgograd
23	CB	Iryna Glibko	18 February 1990 (aged 22)	1.70 m	16	30	(Romania) Danubius Galaţi
33	P	Iaroslava Burlachenko	14 May 1992 (aged 20)	1.72 m	0	0	(Romania) Danubius Galaţi
35	LB	Iryna Stelmakh	18 August 1993 (aged 19)	1.87 m	3	0	(Ukraine) Galytchanka Lviv

== Group B ==
=== Denmark ===
Head coach: Jan Pytlick

No.	Pos.	Name	Date of birth (age)	Height	App.	Goals	Club
1	GK	Sandra Toft	18 October 1989 (aged 23)	1.74 m	27	0	(Denmark) Team Tvis Holstebro
3	LB	Sofie Bloch-Sørensen	19 May 1986 (aged 26)	1.80 m	6	4	(Denmark) Frederiksberg IF
4	P	Susan Thorsgaard	13 October 1988 (aged 24)	1.87 m	82	151	(Denmark) FCM Håndbold
5	LW	Mie Augustesen	19 July 1988 (aged 24)	1.77 m	69	235	(Germany) Thüringer HC
8	RW	Louise Lyksborg	17 January 1988 (aged 24)	1.68 m	30	39	(Denmark) Viborg HK
11	P	Mette Gravholt	12 December 1984 (aged 27)	1.72 m	7	18	(Denmark) Team Tvis Holstebro
12	GK	Cecilie Greve	19 January 1992 (aged 20)	1.85 m	3	0	(Denmark) HC Odense
13	P	Marianne Bonde	25 June 1984 (aged 28)	1.84 m	18	23	(Denmark) Frederiksberg IF
14	CB	Lotte Grigel	5 April 1991 (aged 21)	1.65 m	19	48	(Denmark) Team Esbjerg
15	LB	Pernille Larsen	6 September 1984 (aged 28)	1.82 m	80	90	(Denmark) Viborg HK
19	RB	Line Jørgensen	31 December 1989 (aged 22)	1.82 m	76	179	(Denmark) FCM Håndbold
21	CB	Kristina Kristiansen	13 July 1989 (aged 23)	1.61 m	63	147	(Denmark) Team Tvis Holstebro
23	LW	Ann Grete Nørgaard	15 September 1983 (aged 29)	1.64 m	74	300	(Denmark) Team Tvis Holstebro
24	CB	Lærke Møller	14 January 1988 (aged 24)	1.71 m	44	129	(Denmark) FCM Håndbold
26	RW	Kristina Bille	3 April 1986 (aged 26)	1.68 m	87	128	(Norway) Larvik HK
27	RB	Louise Burgaard	17 October 1992 (aged 20)	1.78 m	31	62	(Denmark) Team Tvis Holstebro
28	LB	Stine Jørgensen	3 September 1990 (aged 22)	1.80 m	27	33	(Denmark) Aalborg DH

=== France ===
Head coach: Olivier Krumbholz

No.	Pos.	Name	Date of birth (age)	Height	App.	Goals	Club
3	RW	Blandine Dancette	14 February 1988 (aged 24)	1.69 m	52	74	(France) HBC Nîmes
4	P	Nina Kamto Njitam	25 June 1983 (aged 29)	1.78 m	161	288	(France) Metz Handball
5	RB	Camille Ayglon	21 May 1985 (aged 27)	1.80 m	138	304	(France) HBC Nîmes
7	CB	Allison Pineau	2 May 1989 (aged 23)	1.81 m	118	281	(Romania) Oltchim Vâlcea
8	LB	Claudine Mendy	8 January 1990 (aged 22)	1.82 m	84	169	(Montenegro) ŽRK Budućnost
9	LW	Paule Baudouin	25 October 1984 (aged 28)	1.72 m	161	469	(France) Metz Handball
12	GK	Linda Pradel	4 June 1983 (aged 29)	1.80 m	45	0	(France) Le Havre
14	RB	Marie-Paule Gnabouyou	4 March 1988 (aged 24)	1.85 m	46	58	(France) Toulon Handball
15	LB	Audrey Bruneau	21 September 1992 (aged 20)	1.89 m	23	15	(France) ES Besançon
16	GK	Cléopâtre Darleux	1 July 1989 (aged 23)	1.76 m	93	2	(Denmark) Viborg HK
17	LW	Siraba Dembélé	28 June 1986 (aged 26)	1.72 m	138	469	(Denmark) Randers HK
19	P	Julie Goiorani	25 May 1988 (aged 24)	1.73 m	26	28	(France) Toulon Handball
20	LW	Raphaëlle Tervel	21 April 1979 (aged 33)	1.79 m	241	370	(Hungary) Győri Audi ETO KC
22	RW	Katty Piejos	21 August 1981 (aged 31)	1.63 m	128	377	(France) Metz Handball
24	LB	Mariama Signaté	22 July 1985 (aged 27)	1.86 m	128	377	(France) Issy-Paris Hand
64	RB	Alexandra Lacrabère	27 April 1987 (aged 25)	1.77 m	104	261	(Russia) Zvezda Zvenigorod

=== Macedonia ===
Head coach: Gino Strezovski

No.	Pos.	Name	Date of birth (age)	Height	App.	Goals	Club
2	P	Robertina Mečevska	16 November 1984 (aged 28)	1.72 m	69	97	(North Macedonia) ŽRK Metalurg
5	LB	Ivana Sazdovski	12 April 1990 (aged 22)	1.76 m	0	0	(North Macedonia) ŽRK Vardar
6	LB	Savica Mrkikj	26 September 1991 (aged 21)	1.82 m	7	15	(North Macedonia) Žito Prilep
8	RW	Simona Grozdanovska	15 April 1988 (aged 24)	1.75 m	21	16	(North Macedonia) ŽRK Metalurg
9	P	Nataša Mladenovska	12 February 1986 (aged 26)	1.73 m	53	95	(North Macedonia) ŽRK Metalurg
10	LB	Dushica Gjorgjievska	28 December 1987 (aged 24)	1.77 m	37	46	(North Macedonia) ŽRK Metalurg
11	LB	Mirjeta Bajramoska	22 November 1984 (aged 28)	1.79 m	52	61	(North Macedonia) ŽRK Metalurg
14	CB	Julija Portjanko	20 April 1983 (aged 29)	1.76 m	57	187	(Russia) Zvezda Zvenigorod
15	CB	Biljana Crvenkoska	6 September 1983 (aged 29)	1.69 m	68	68	(Italy) PDO Salerno
16	GK	Tanja Andrejeva	17 June 1978 (aged 34)	1.75 m	95	2	(North Macedonia) ŽRK Metalurg
17	LW	Dragana Pecevska	11 April 1983 (aged 29)	1.70 m	58	101	(North Macedonia) ŽRK Metalurg
20	GK	Dijana Naumoska	5 January 1985 (aged 27)	1.73 m	22	0	(North Macedonia) Žito Prilep
36	RW	Marija Papudjieva	26 June 1977 (aged 35)	1.69 m	27	39	(Turkey) Bodrum Kalikarnas
51	LB	Zorica Despodovska	20 December 1991 (aged 20)	1.82 m	9	29	(North Macedonia) ŽRK Metalurg
90	LW	Dragica Mitrova	5 November 1987 (aged 25)	1.63 m	11	9	(North Macedonia) ŽRK Metalurg
91	LB	Marija Shteriova	19 March 1991 (aged 21)	1.78 m	7	6	(North Macedonia) Žito Prilep

=== Sweden ===
Head coach: Torbjörn Klingvall

No.	Pos.	Name	Date of birth (age)	Height	App.	Goals	Club
1	GK	Maria Olsson	8 December 1986 (aged 25)	1.70 m	1	0	(Denmark) Aalborg DH
2	P	Ulrika Ågren	13 July 1987 (aged 25)	1.76 m	35	53	(Denmark) Team Esbjerg
3	P	Tina Flognman	29 June 1981 (aged 31)	1.78 m	215	381	(France) Toulon Saint-Cyr
5	RW	Hanna Fogelström	8 November 1990 (aged 22)	1.79 m	28	43	(Sweden) IK Sävehof
7	P	Linn Blohm	20 May 1992 (aged 20)	1.79 m	1	0	(Sweden) IK Sävehof
8	LB	Jamina Roberts	28 May 1990 (aged 22)	1.75 m	51	74	(Sweden) IK Sävehof
9	LW	Louise Sand	27 December 1992 (aged 19)	1.63 m	2	1	(Sweden) IK Sävehof
10	RW	Emma Hawia Svensson	10 December 1990 (aged 21)	1.72 m	2	1	(Sweden) Skuru IK
14	LB	Johanna Westberg	6 April 1990 (aged 22)	1.85 m	0	0	(Sweden) Skuru IK
15	LB	Johanna Ahlm	3 October 1987 (aged 25)	1.75 m	90	337	(Denmark) Viborg HK
16	GK	Cecilia Grubbström	2 September 1986 (aged 26)	1.78 m	70	1	(Denmark) Viborg HK
17	LB	Linnea Torstensson	30 March 1983 (aged 29)	1.86 m	124	517	(Slovenia) RK Krim
20	CB	Isabelle Gulldén	29 June 1989 (aged 23)	1.79 m	99	288	(Denmark) Viborg HK
22	LW	Jessica Helleberg	20 February 1986 (aged 26)	1.72 m	47	64	(Sweden) Team Esbjerg
25	CB	Angelica Wallén	11 April 1986 (aged 26)	1.71 m	43	62	(Sweden) Team Esbjerg
27	CB	Sabina Jacobsen	24 March 1989 (aged 23)	1.80 m	43	72	(Denmark) Randers HK

== Group C ==
=== Croatia ===
Head coach: Vladimir Canjuga

No.	Pos.	Name	Date of birth (age)	Height	App.	Goals	Club
3	LW	Ekatarina Nemaškalo	31 July 1989 (aged 23)	1.70 m	1	1	(Croatia) RK Sesvete
4	LB	Maja Kožnjak	16 April 1985 (aged 27)	1.72 m	67	70	(Croatia) RK Lokomotiva
7	RB	Ivana Petković	6 June 1985 (aged 27)	1.77 m	50	62	(Croatia) RK Zelina
8	RW	Anita Gaće	14 April 1983 (aged 29)	1.77 m	129	175	(Croatia) RK Podravka
12	GK	Marta Žderić	20 April 1990 (aged 22)	1.83 m	37	0	(Croatia) RK Podravka
14	CB	Kristina Elez	22 May 1987 (aged 25)	1.80 m	117	383	(Hungary) Érdi VSE
16	GK	Ivana Jelčić	16 March 1980 (aged 32)	1.79 m	192	0	(Croatia) RK Podravka
17	P	Katarina Ježić	19 December 1992 (aged 19)	1.73 m	17	30	(Montenegro) ŽRK Budućnost
18	CB	Ivana Lovrić	1 September 1984 (aged 28)	1.73 m	60	81	(Croatia) RK Samobor
19	LW	Maja Zebić	30 May 1982 (aged 30)	1.78 m	148	379	(Serbia) ŽRK Zaječar
20	P	Vesna Milanović-Litre	30 May 1986 (aged 26)	1.80 m	73	118	(Croatia) RK Podravka
21	RW	Aneta Peraica	29 July 1985 (aged 27)	1.74 m	21	44	(Serbia) ŽRK Zaječar
25	P	Dragica Džono	24 May 1987 (aged 25)	1.84 m	18	16	(Croatia) RK Zelina
26	RB	Žana Čović	20 August 1989 (aged 23)	1.80 m	15	3	(Croatia) RK Podravka
27	LB	Lana Franković	27 September 1991 (aged 21)	1.83 m	3	2	(Croatia) RK Sesvete
29	RB	Sonja Bašić	26 November 1987 (aged 25)	1.82 m	29	30	(North Macedonia) ŽRK Metalurg

=== Germany ===
Head coach: Heine Jensen

No.	Pos.	Name	Date of birth (age)	Height	App.	Goals	Club
2	RW	Marlene Zapf	6 January 1990 (aged 22)	1.70 m	8	13	(Germany) Bayer Leverkusen
5	LB	Saskia Lang	19 December 1986 (aged 25)	1.79 m	13	13	(Germany) HC Leipzig
7	LW	Natalie Augsburg	15 November 1983 (aged 29)	1.76 m	39	65	(Germany) HC Leipzig
8	P	Anne Müller	5 July 1983 (aged 29)	1.74 m	133	177	(Germany) HC Leipzig
9	CB	Kim Naidzinavicius	6 April 1991 (aged 21)	1.81 m	3	4	(Germany) Bayer Leverkusen
10	CB	Anna Loerper	18 November 1984 (aged 28)	1.64 m	164	288	(Denmark) Team Tvis Holstebro
11	RB	Anne Hubinger	31 July 1993 (aged 19)	1.85 m	0	0	(Germany) HC Leipzig
12	GK	Katja Schülke	18 March 1984 (aged 28)	1.78 m	78	0	(Germany) HC Leipzig
14	RB	Christine Beier	12 December 1983 (aged 28)	1.78 m	30	46	(Germany) Frankfurter HC
16	GK	Clara Woltering	2 March 1983 (aged 29)	1.78 m	138	0	(Montenegro) ŽRK Budućnost
18	LB	Laura Steinbach	2 August 1985 (aged 27)	1.81 m	72	114	(Germany) Bayer Leverkusen
20	P	Anja Althaus	3 September 1982 (aged 30)	1.74 m	196	428	(Germany) Thüringer HC
21	LB	Nadja Nadgornaja	22 September 1988 (aged 24)	1.84 m	27	104	(Germany) Thüringer HC
26	LB	Angie Geschke	24 May 1985 (aged 27)	1.77 m	30	35	(Norway) IK Våg
31	CB	Kerstin Wohlbold	11 January 1984 (aged 28)	1.70 m	22	50	(Germany) Thüringer HC
32	RW	Friederike Lütz	26 March 1988 (aged 24)	1.75 m	7	16	(Germany) Buxtehuder SV

=== Hungary ===
Head coach: Karl Erik Bøhn

No.	Pos.	Name	Date of birth (age)	Height	App.	Goals	Club
5	CB	Krisztina Triscsuk	17 July 1985 (aged 27)	1.76 m	0	0	(Hungary) Fehérvár KC
6	LW	Orsolya Vérten	22 July 1982 (aged 30)	1.70 m	129	384	(Hungary) Ferencvárosi TC
7	CB	Zita Szucsánszki	22 May 1987 (aged 25)	1.72 m	78	265	(Hungary) Ferencvárosi TC
8	CB	Anikó Kovacsics	29 August 1991 (aged 21)	1.70 m	36	66	(Hungary) Győri Audi ETO KC
9	LW	Melinda Vincze	12 November 1983 (aged 29)	1.73 m	51	71	(Hungary) Érdi VSE
10	LB	Anita Bulath	20 September 1983 (aged 29)	1.77 m	56	149	(Denmark) Viborg HK
11	P	Valéria Szabó	2 March 1983 (aged 29)	1.81 m	52	64	(Russia) Zvezda Zvenigorod
12	GK	Orsolya Herr	23 November 1984 (aged 28)	1.76 m	118	0	(Hungary) Győri Audi ETO KC
13	CB	Anita Görbicz	13 May 1983 (aged 29)	1.73 m	176	814	(Hungary) Győri Audi ETO KC
15	LB	Kinga Klivinyi	31 March 1992 (aged 20)	1.78 m	3	7	(Hungary) Váci NKSE
18	P	Piroska Szamoránsky	9 July 1986 (aged 26)	1.71 m	97	211	(Hungary) Ferencvárosi TC
20	RB	Viktória Rédei Soós	28 July 1985 (aged 27)	1.81 m	11	14	(Hungary) Győri Audi ETO KC
21	GK	Éva Kiss	30 July 1987 (aged 25)	1.89 m	15	0	(Hungary) Siófok KC
22	RW	Bernadett Bódi	9 March 1986 (aged 26)	1.75 m	71	109	(Hungary) Dunaújvárosi Akadémia
23	LB	Klára Szekeres	1 December 1987 (aged 25)	1.86 m	36	14	(Hungary) Érdi VSE
83	RW	Mónika Kovacsicz	20 November 1983 (aged 29)	1.71 m	110	266	(Hungary) Ferencvárosi TC
87	LB	Zsuzsanna Tomori	18 June 1987 (aged 25)	1.86 m	101	247	(Hungary) Ferencvárosi TC

=== Spain ===
Head coach: Jorge Dueñas

No.	Pos.	Name	Date of birth (age)	Height	App.	Goals	Club
1	GK	Cristina González	6 August 1983 (aged 29)	1.79 m	104	0	(Spain) Club León
4	RW	Carmen Martín	29 May 1988 (aged 24)	1.69 m	124	363	(Slovenia) RK Krim
7	CB	Beatriz Fernández	19 March 1985 (aged 27)	1.80 m	132	290	(France) CJF Fleury Loiret
8	P	Verónica Cuadrado	8 March 1979 (aged 33)	1.82 m	168	215	(Denmark) KIF Kolding
9	LB	Marta Mangué	23 April 1983 (aged 29)	1.70 m	223	842	(Serbia) ŽRK Zaječar
10	CB	Macarena Aguilar	12 March 1985 (aged 27)	1.70 m	160	488	(Denmark) Randers HK
11	RB	Nuria Benzal	3 April 1985 (aged 27)	1.69 m	61	100	(Serbia) ŽRK Zaječar
12	GK	Silvia Navarro	20 March 1979 (aged 33)	1.65 m	79	2	(Romania) Râmnicu Vâlcea
13	RW	Jessica Alonso	20 September 1983 (aged 29)	1.75 m	83	185	(Serbia) ŽRK Zaječar
14	LW	Elisabeth Chávez	17 November 1990 (aged 22)	1.92 m	85	22	(France) Nice Handball
17	LW	Elisabeth Pinedo	13 May 1981 (aged 31)	1.74 m	129	277	(Spain) BM Bera Bera
18	P	Begoña Fernández	22 March 1980 (aged 32)	1.83 m	158	345	(Serbia) ŽRK Zaječar
21	LW	Vanesa Amorós	7 December 1982 (aged 29)	1.67 m	99	91	(Spain) Mecalia Atlético Guardés
25	LB	Nerea Pena	13 December 1989 (aged 22)	1.75 m	45	125	(Hungary) Ferencvárosi TC
30	RB	Patricia Elorza	8 April 1984 (aged 28)	1.80 m	49	30	(Spain) BM Bera Bera
86	LB	Alexandrina Barbosa	5 May 1986 (aged 26)	1.75 m	0	0	(Romania) Râmnicu Vâlcea

== Group D ==
=== Iceland ===
Head coach: Águst Þór Jóhannsson

No.	Pos.	Name	Date of birth (age)	Height	App.	Goals	Club
1	GK	Guðný Jenny Ásmundsdóttir	28 February 1982 (aged 30)	1.75 m	34	1	(Iceland) Valur Handball
2	CB	Karen Knútsdóttir	4 February 1990 (aged 22)	1.67 m	49	137	(Germany) Blomberg-Lippe
3	P	Arna Sif Pálsdóttir	5 January 1988 (aged 24)	1.84 m	79	88	(Denmark) Aalborg DH
4	RW	Þórey Rósa Stefánsdóttir	14 August 1989 (aged 23)	1.67 m	40	83	(Denmark) Team Tvis Holstebro
5	RB	Rut Arnfjörð Jónsdóttir	21 July 1990 (aged 22)	1.76 m	58	107	(Denmark) Team Tvis Holstebro
7	CB	Rakel Dögg Bragadóttir	24 May 1986 (aged 26)	1.78 m	83	252	(Iceland) UHF Stjarnan
8	LB	Stella Sigurðardóttir	30 March 1990 (aged 22)	1.81 m	56	168	(Iceland) Fram
9	LW	Dagný Skúladóttir	10 May 1980 (aged 32)	1.68 m	106	262	(Iceland) Valur Handball
13	LW	Ásta Birna Gunnarsdóttir	29 October 1984 (aged 28)	1.65 m	69	81	(Iceland) Fram
14	LB	Hrafnhildur Skúladóttir	9 August 1977 (aged 35)	1.77 m	157	607	(Iceland) Valur Handball
15	RW	Hanna Guðrún Stefánsdóttir	11 February 1979 (aged 33)	1.64 m	127	435	(Iceland) UHF Stjarnan
17	P	Anna Úrsúla Guðmundsdóttir	1 May 1985 (aged 27)	1.81 m	88	210	(Iceland) Valur Handball
20	RB	Jóna Margrét Ragnarsdóttir	29 March 1983 (aged 29)	1.68 m	57	107	(Iceland) UHF Stjarnan
21	RB	Hildur Þorgeirsdóttir	11 March 1989 (aged 23)	1.78 m	21	11	(Germany) Blomberg-Lippe
22	LB	Ramune Pekarskyte	5 October 1980 (aged 32)	1.85 m	2	2	(Norway) Levanger Handball
30	GK	Dröfn Haraldsdóttir	8 April 1991 (aged 21)	1.70 m	0	0	(Iceland) FH

=== Montenegro ===
Head coach: Dragan Adžić

No.	Pos.	Name	Date of birth (age)	Height	App.	Goals	Club
1	GK	Marina Vukčević	24 August 1993 (aged 19)	1.78 m	44	0	(Montenegro) ŽRK Budućnost
2	RW	Radmila Miljanić	19 April 1988 (aged 24)	1.74 m	93	108	(Montenegro) ŽRK Budućnost
3	LW	Biljana Pavićević	12 May 1988 (aged 24)	1.70 m	9	17	(Montenegro) ŽRK Budućnost
4	RW	Jovanka Radičević	23 October 1986 (aged 26)	1.69 m	94	510	(Hungary) Győri Audi ETO KC
5	P	Ana Đokić	9 February 1979 (aged 33)	1.69 m	23	52	(Russia) Rostov-Don
6	LB	Jelena Despotović	30 April 1994 (aged 18)	1.83 m	3	1	(Montenegro) ŽRK Budućnost
8	LB	Marija Jovanović	26 December 1985 (aged 26)	1.82 m	86	398	(Romania) Râmnicu Vâlcea
10	CB	Anđela Bulatović	15 January 1987 (aged 25)	1.75 m	85	141	(Montenegro) ŽRK Budućnost
12	GK	Sonja Barjaktarović	11 September 1986 (aged 26)	1.80 m	86	0	(Russia) Rostov-Don
15	RB	Andrea Klikovac	5 May 1991 (aged 21)	1.74 m	3	5	(North Macedonia) RK Vardar
19	P	Sara Vukčević	25 March 1992 (aged 20)	1.83 m	10	4	(Hungary) Érdi VSE
20	RB	Jasna Tošković	16 March 1989 (aged 23)	1.89 m	14	16	(France) Issy-Paris Hand
25	LB	Sandra Nikčević	16 November 1984 (aged 28)	1.87 m	22	18	(Hungary) Alcoa FKC
26	P	Suzana Lazović	28 January 1992 (aged 20)	1.76 m	57	72	(Montenegro) ŽRK Budućnost
32	RB	Katarina Bulatović	15 November 1984 (aged 28)	1.86 m	24	139	(Romania) Râmnicu Vâlcea
77	LW	Majda Mehmedović	25 May 1990 (aged 22)	1.69 m	56	98	(Montenegro) ŽRK Budućnost
90	CB	Milena Knežević	12 March 1990 (aged 22)	1.78 m	77	178	(Montenegro) ŽRK Budućnost

=== Romania ===
Head coach: Gheorghe Tadici

No.	Pos.	Name	Date of birth (age)	Height	App.	Goals	Club
1	GK	Mihaela Smedescu	1 March 1986 (aged 26)	1.78 m	25	0	(Romania) HCM Baia Mare
4	LB	Adriana Ţăcălie	29 January 1989 (aged 23)	1.80 m	18	22	(Romania) Corona Brașov
6	P	Crina Pintea	3 April 1990 (aged 22)	1.90 m	4	4	(Romania) HC Zalău
7	RW	Adriana Nechita	14 November 1983 (aged 29)	1.72 m	110	248	(Romania) Oltchim Vâlcea
8	LB	Cristina Neagu	26 August 1988 (aged 24)	1.80 m	111	455	(Romania) Oltchim Vâlcea
9	CB	Aurelia Brădeanu	5 May 1979 (aged 33)	1.80 m	230	560	(Romania) Oltchim Vâlcea
10	P	Ionela Stanca	9 January 1981 (aged 31)	1.76 m	163	470	(Romania) Oltchim Vâlcea
11	P	Oana Manea	18 April 1985 (aged 27)	1.76 m	155	328	(Romania) Oltchim Vâlcea
18	LB	Adina Meiroşu	11 August 1985 (aged 27)	1.80 m	170	404	(Romania) Oltchim Vâlcea
19	LW	Iulia Curea	8 April 1982 (aged 30)	1.72 m	82	194	(Romania) Oltchim Vâlcea
21	GK	Talida Tolnai	21 August 1979 (aged 33)	1.87 m	131	1	(Turkey) Üsküdar Bld. SK
22	LW	Nicoleta Dincă	2 July 1988 (aged 24)	1.70 m	10	15	(Romania) U Jolidon Cluj
25	LB/RB	Clara Vădineanu	26 October 1986 (aged 26)	1.83 m	47	108	(Romania) U Jolidon Cluj
30	GK	Paula Ungureanu	30 March 1980 (aged 32)	1.80 m	116	2	(Romania) Oltchim Vâlcea
55	RB	Melinda Geiger	28 March 1987 (aged 25)	1.78 m	68	163	(Romania) HCM Baia Mare
80	RW	Magdalena Paraschiv	11 August 1982 (aged 30)	1.68 m	26	32	(Romania) U Jolidon Cluj

=== Russia ===
Head coach: Vitaly Krokhin

No.	Pos.	Name	Date of birth (age)	Height	App.	Goals	Club
2	LW	Polina Kuznetcova	10 June 1987 (aged 25)	1.70 m	86	277	(Russia) Zvezda Zvenigorod
3	CB	Tatiana Khmyrova	6 February 1990 (aged 22)	1.78 m	58	182	(Russia) Dinamo Volgograd
5	LB	Lyudmila Postnova	11 August 1984 (aged 28)	1.83 m	182	641	(Russia) Zvezda Zvenigorod
7	LW	Elena Avdekova	7 January 1989 (aged 23)	1.80 m	9	10	(Russia) Dinamo Volgograd
8	LB	Anna Sen	3 December 1990 (aged 22)	1.85 m	42	106	(Russia) Rostov-Don
10	P	Alexandra Stepanova	21 June 1989 (aged 23)	1.80 m	7	0	(Russia) Dinamo Volgograd
11	LB	Ksenia Milova	6 January 1992 (aged 20)	1.83 m	0	0	(Russia) Dinamo Volgograd
12	GK	Maria Basarab	19 January 1990 (aged 22)	1.83 m	3	0	(Russia) Lada Togliatti
15	RW	Marina Yartseva	17 February 1989 (aged 23)	1.56 m	32	56	(Russia) Rostov-Don
16	GK	Maria Sidorova	21 November 1979 (aged 33)	1.78 m	177	5	(Russia) Lada Togliatti
17	CB	Yekaterina Andryushina	17 August 1985 (aged 27)	1.85 m	92	205	(France) Metz Handball
19	P	Ksenia Makeeva	19 September 1990 (aged 22)	1.85 m	36	66	(Russia) Dinamo Volgograd
23	RB	Anna Punko	27 February 1989 (aged 23)	1.83 m	3	4	(Russia) Kuban Krasnodar
25	LW	Emiliya Turey	6 October 1984 (aged 28)	1.56 m	180	613	(Russia) HC Astrakhanochka
28	LB	Victoria Zhilinskaite	6 March 1989 (aged 23)	1.88 m	83	130	(Russia) Lada Togliatti
29	RW	Olga Chernoivanenko	17 April 1989 (aged 23)	1.75 m	60	135	(Russia) Lada Togliatti
33	CB	Ekaterina Ilyina	7 March 1991 (aged 21)	1.75 m	15	22	(Russia) Kuban Krasnodar
