= Skúladóttir =

Skúladóttir is an Icelandic patronymic meaning "daughter of Skúli". In Old Norse and Icelandic names, this is not a family name. Notable people with the surname include:

- Dagný Skúladóttir (born 1980), Icelandic handball player
- Hrafnhildur Skúladóttir (born 1977), Icelandic handball player
- Margrét Skúladóttir (1208–1270), Norwegian queen consort
- Petrúnella Skúladóttir (born 1985), Icelandic basketball player
