= Mrkić =

Mrkić (Serbian Cyrillic: Мркић) is a surname. Notable people with the surname include:

- Ivan Mrkić (born 1953), Serbian diplomat and politician
- Jelena Mrkić (born 1983), Croatian-born Serbian pop singer
- Jovana Mrkić (born 1994), Montenegrin footballer
- Marko Mrkić (born 1996), Serbian footballer
- Saša Mrkić (born 1967), Serbian football manager and former player
- Savica Mrkić (born 1991), Macedonian handball player
