= Arnhild =

Arnhild is a given name. Notable people with the given name include:

- Arnhild Holmlimo (born 1983), retired Norwegian handball player
- Arnhild Lauveng (born 1972), Norwegian psychologist
- Arnhild Skre (born 1952), Norwegian newspaper editor, press historian and biographer
