= Krokhin =

Krokhin or Krohin (Russian: Крохин) is a Russian male surname, its feminine counterpart is Krokhina or Krohina. Notable people with the surname include:

- Lyudmila Krokhina (born 1954), Russian rower
- Vitaly Krokhin (born 1947), Russian handball coach
