= Dana Björg Guðmundsdóttir =

Icelandic and Norwegian handballer

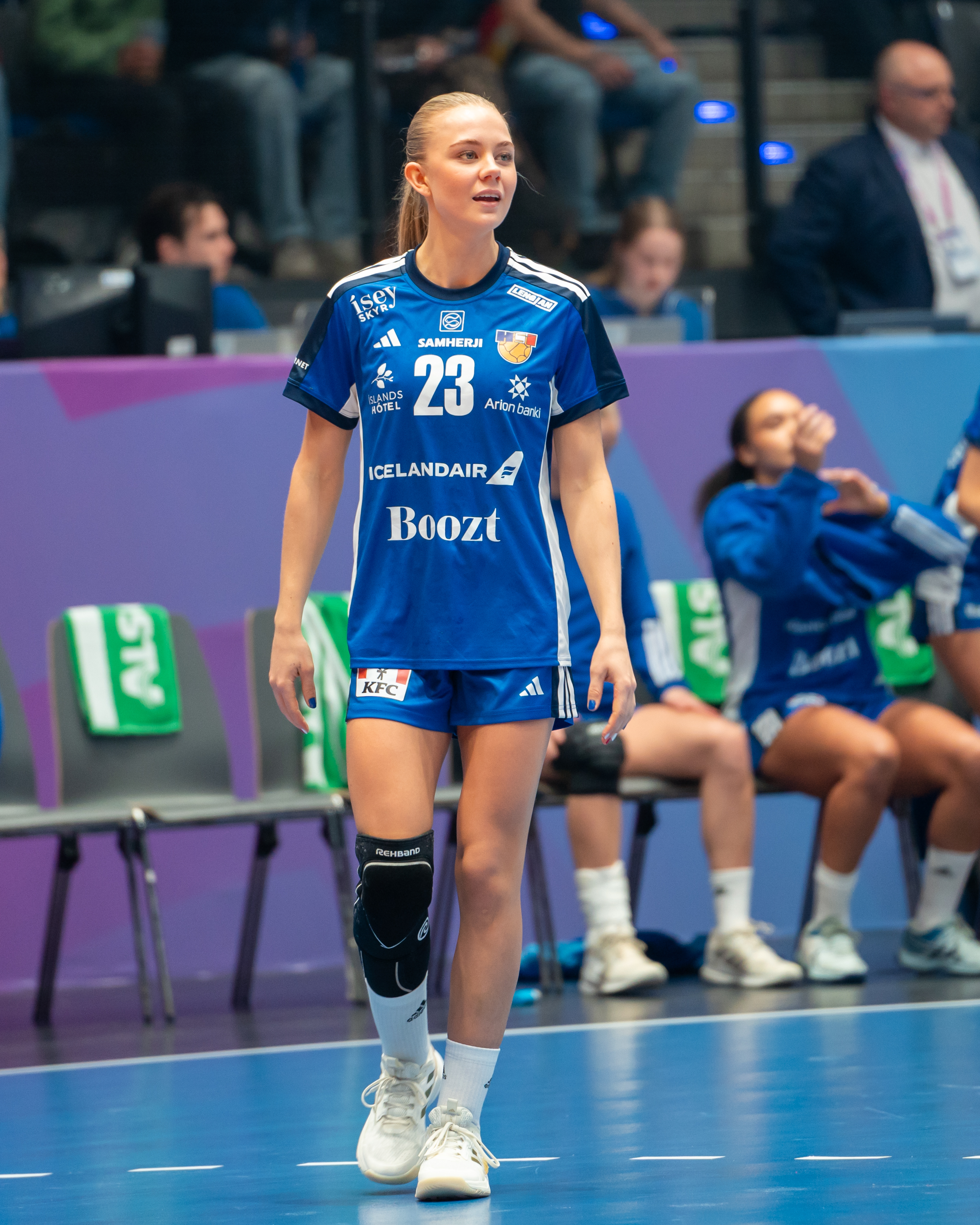

Personal information
- Nationality: Icelandic / Norwegian
- Born: 1 June 2002 (age 24) Reykjavík, Iceland
- Height: 1.78 m (5 ft 10 in)

Sport
- Sport: Handball
- Position: Left wing
- Current club: Volda
- Number: 23

Youth career
- Years: Team
- –2020: Konnerud
- 2020–2022: Reistad IL

Senior clubs
- Years: Team
- 2022–2026: Volda
- 2026–: Larvik HK
National team
Years	Team	Apps	(Gls)
2024–	Iceland	12	(25)

Dana Björg Guðmundsdóttir (born 1 June 2002) is an Icelandic-Norwegian handballer for Volda and the Icelandic national handball team.

== Personal life ==
Dana was born in Iceland to Icelandic former bodybuilders Guðmundur Bragason and Inga Steingrímsdóttir.
