= Davíðsdóttir =

Davíðsdóttir is an Icelandic surname meaning "daughter of David". Notable people with the surname include:

- Brynhildur Davíðsdóttir (born 1968), Icelandic professor
- Dagný Lísa Davíðsdóttir (born 1997), Icelandic basketball player
- Eva Björk Davíðsdóttir (born 1994), Icelandic handball player
- Katrín Davíðsdóttir (born 1993), Icelandic CrossFit athlete
- Ingibjörg Davíðsdóttir (born 1970), Icelandic diplomat and politician
- Sigrún Davíðsdóttir (born 1955), Icelandic journalist
- Sunna Davíðsdóttir (born 1985), Icelandic mixed martial artist
- Vilborg Davíðsdóttir (born 1965), Icelandic writer
