= Zimny =

Zimny is a surname which means "cold" in Polish. Notable people with the surname include:

- Aleksandra Zimny (born 1996), Polish handball player
- Arthur L. Zimny (1900–1973), American politician
- Bob Zimny (1921–2011), American football player
- Kazimierz Zimny (1935–2022), Polish athlete
- Simon Zimny (1927–2007), French footballer
- Tymoteusz Zimny (born 1998), Polish sprinter
