= Helena Örvarsdóttir =

Icelandic handball player (born 1994)

Personal information
- Full name: Helena Rut Örvarsdóttir
- Nationality: Icelandic
- Born: 17 May 1994 (age 32) Garðabær, Iceland

Sport
- Sport: Handball
- Position: Left back
- Current club: Stjarnan
- Number: 18

Senior clubs
- Years: Team
- –2017: Stjarnan
- 2017–2019: Byåsen HE
- 2019–2020: SønderjyskE Håndbold
- 2020–: Stjarnan
National team
Years	Team	Apps	(Gls)
2017–	Iceland	38	(76)

Helena Rut Örvarsdóttir (born 17 May 1994) is an Icelandic handballer who plays for Stjarnan and the Iceland national team.

== Achievements ==
- Úrvalsdeild kvenna:
  - Silver Medalist: 2017
