= Elín Rósa Magnúsdóttir =

Icelandic handballer (born 2002)

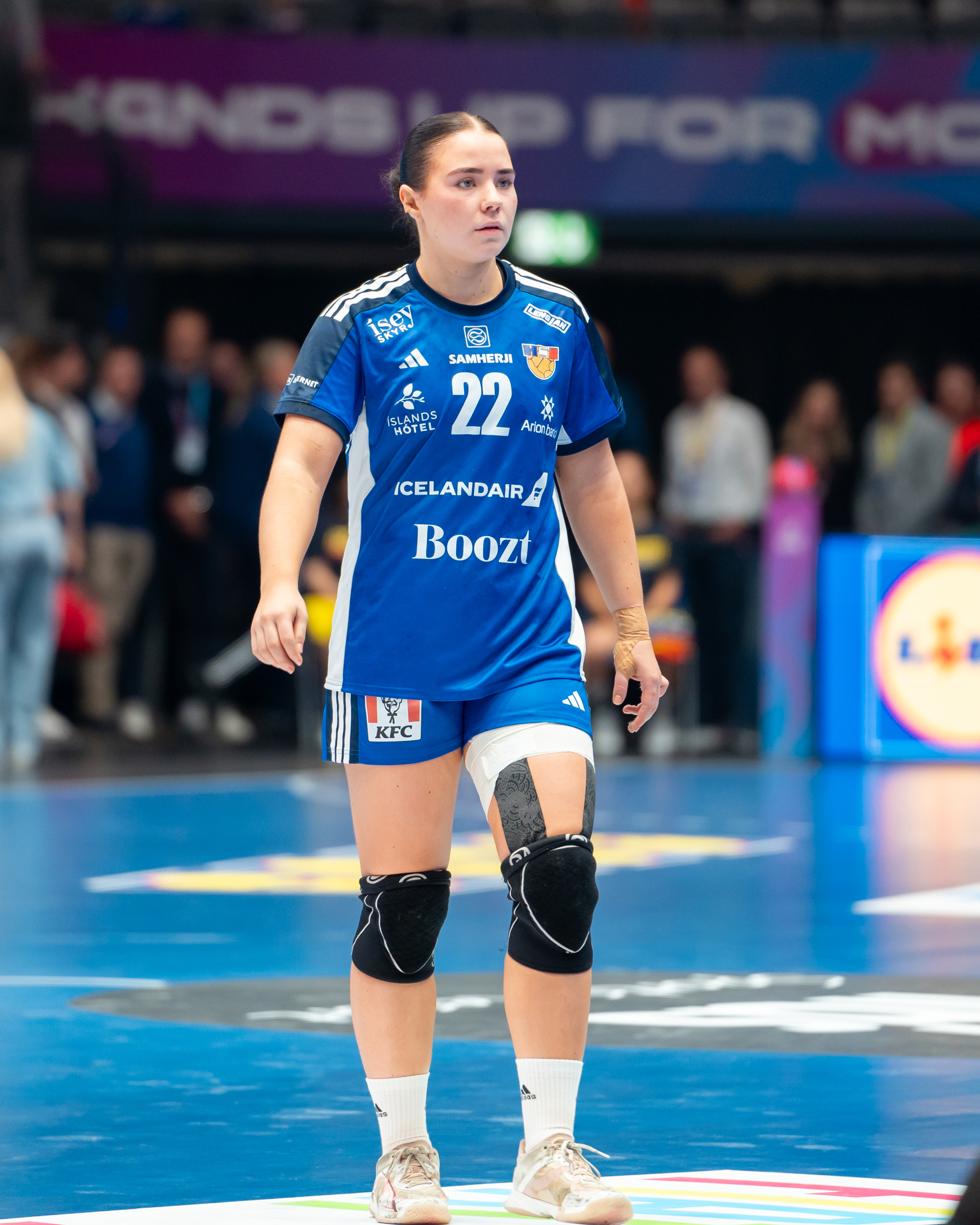

Personal information
- Nationality: Icelandic
- Born: 22 October 2002 (age 23) Reykjavík, Iceland
- Height: 1.67 m (5 ft 6 in)

Sport
- Sport: Handball
- Position: Centre back
- Current club: HSG Blomberg-Lippe
- Number: 33

Youth career
- Years: Team
- -2016: Íþróttafélag Reykjavíkur

Senior clubs
- Years: Team
- 2016-2019: Fylkir
- 2019–2025: Valur
- 2025–: HSG Blomberg-Lippe
National team
Years	Team	Apps	(Gls)
2025–	Iceland	31	(59)
- Updated on 7 November 2025

Elín Rósa Magnúsdóttir (born 22 October 2002) is an Icelandic handballer who plays for Icelandic top division side Valur, winning the Icelandic national league in 2023.

She was selected for the Icelandic national team in 2023 as a center back.

In an interview after winning the Icelandic national league she said "It doesn't get better than this" and in reference to her teammates "We are best friends and that helps us."
