= Haraldsdóttir =

Haraldsdóttir is an Icelandic surname, meaning daughter of Harald. Notable people with the surname include:

- Birna Berg Haraldsdóttir (born 1993), Icelandic handball player
- Dröfn Haraldsdóttir (born 1991), Icelandic handball player
- Erla Dögg Haraldsdóttir (born 1988), Icelandic swimmer
- Freyja Haraldsdóttir (born 1986), Icelandic politician and disability rights activist
- Ingibjörg Haraldsdóttir (born 1942), Icelandic poet and translator
