= Ragnhildur Rósa Guðmundsdóttir =

Icelandic handball player (born 1984)

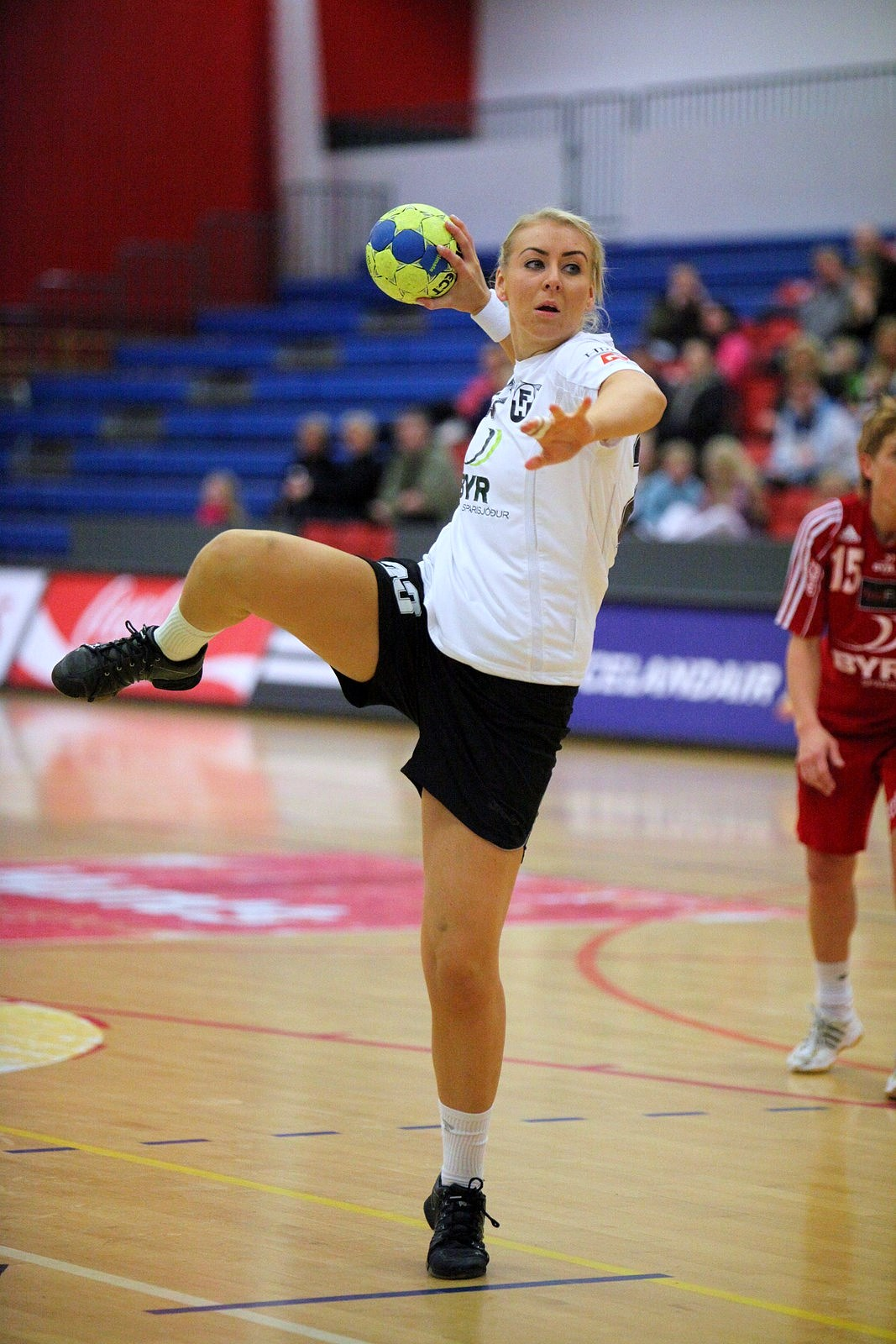
- Ragnhildur in 2009 with FH.

Personal information
- Nationality: Icelandic
- Born: 20 June 1984 (age 42) Reykjavík, Iceland
- Height: 175 cm (69 in)

Sport
- Sport: Handball
- Position: Playmaker

Senior clubs
- Years: Team
- –2002: FH Hafnarfjordur
- 2002–2006: Haukar Hafnarfjörður
- 2006–2007: Skive fH
- 2007–2010: FH Hafnarfjordur
- 2010–2014: Valur
National team
Years	Team	Apps	(Gls)
2002–?	Iceland	67	(43)
- Updated on 26 February 2024

Ragnhildur Rósa Guðmundsdóttir (born 20 July 1984) is an Icelandic former team handball player. She played on the Icelandic national team and participated at the 2011 World Women's Handball Championship in Brazil.
