= Hildigunnur Einarsdóttir =

Icelandic handball player (born 1988)

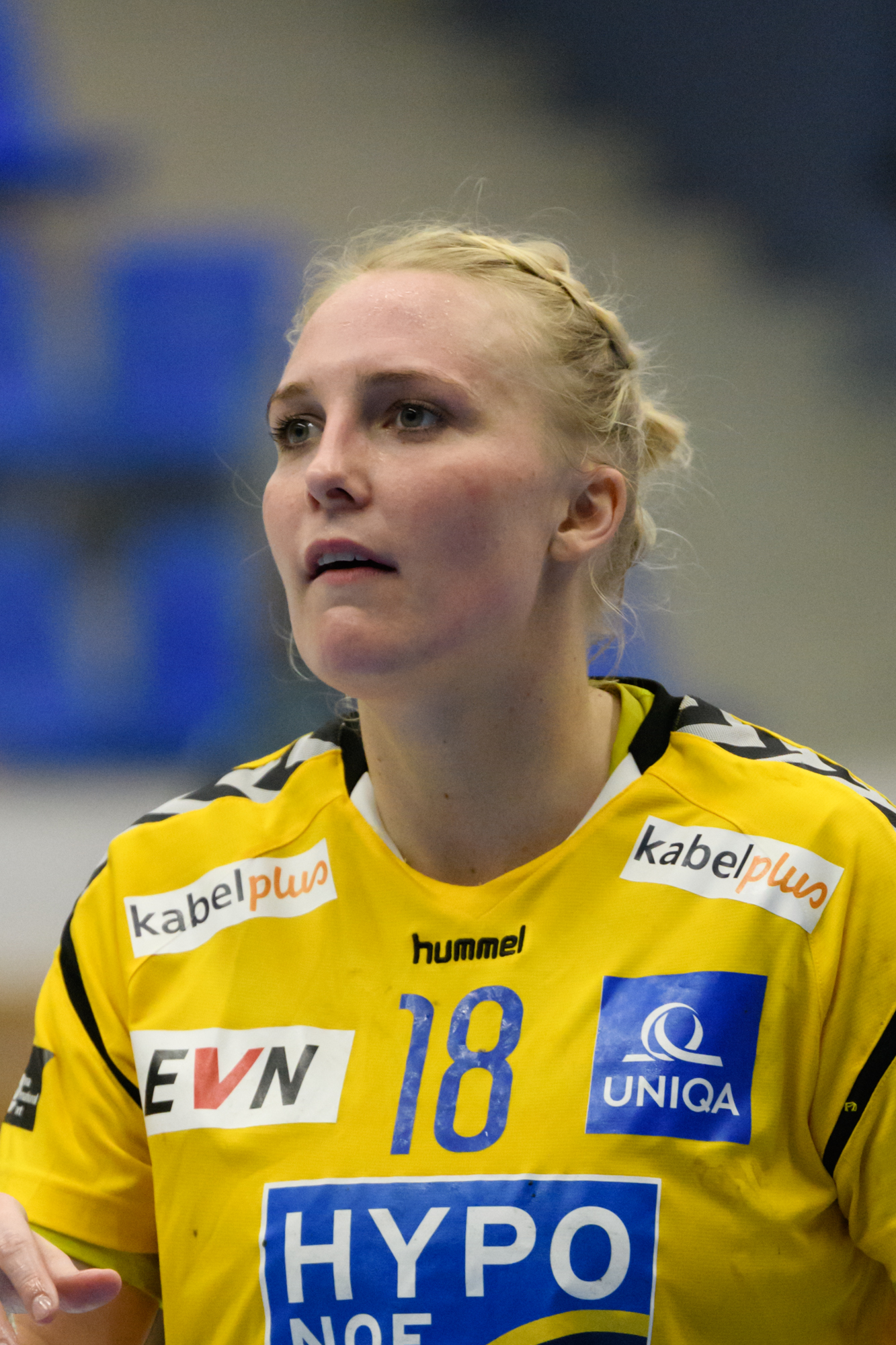

Personal information
- Nationality: Icelandic
- Born: 11 February 1988 (age 38) Reykjavík, Iceland
- Height: 1.80 m (5 ft 11 in)

Sport
- Sport: Handball
- Position: Line player
- Current club: Valur
- Number: 18

Senior clubs
- Years: Team
- 2007–2012: Valur
- 2012–2014: Tertnes IL
- 2014–2015: BK Heid
- 2015–2016: VL Koblenz/Tus Weibern
- 2016–2017: HC Leipzig
- 2017–2018: Hypo Niederösterreich
- 2018–2019: Borussia Dortmund
- 2019–2021: Bayer 04 Leverkusen
- 2021–2025: Valur
National team
Years	Team	Apps	(Gls)
–	Iceland	106	(124)
- Updated on 2 July 2025

Hildigunnur Einarsdóttir (born 11 February 1988) is an Icelandic former handball player for Valur. and the Icelandic national team.
