= Jóna Margrét Ragnarsdóttir =

Icelandic handball player (born 1983)

Personal information
- Nationality: Icelandic
- Born: 29 March 1983 (age 43)
- Height: 1.68 m (5 ft 6 in)

Sport
- Sport: Handball
- Position: Right back

Senior clubs
- Years: Team
- –2004: Stjarnan
- 2004–2005: TuS Weibern
- 2005–2014: Stjarnan
National team
Years	Team	Apps	(Gls)
–	Iceland	64	(119)
- Updated on 26 February 2018

Jóna Margrét Ragnarsdóttir (born 29 March 1983) is an Icelandic former handball player and a former member of the Icelandic national handball team.
