= Eva Björk Davíðsdóttir =

Icelandic handball player (born 1994)

Personal information
- Nationality: Icelandic
- Born: 30 June 1994 (age 32) Reykjavík, Iceland
- Height: 177 cm (70 in)

Sport
- Sport: Handball
- Position: Centre back
- Current club: Stjarnan
- Number: 20

Senior clubs
- Years: Team
- 2010-2016: Íþróttafélagið Grótta (Iceland)
- 2016-2017: Sola HK (Norway)
- 2017-2019: Ajax København (Denmark)
- 2019-2020: Skuru IK (Sweden)
- 2020-: Stjarnan (Iceland)
National team
Years	Team	Apps	(Gls)
2021-	Iceland	11	(3)
- Updated on 26 February 2018

Eva Björk Davíðsdóttir (born 30 June 1994) is an Icelandic handball player for Stjarnan and the Icelandic national team.

She has previously played for the Danish League club Ajax København until 2019.
