= Hege Løken =

Norwegian handball player (born 1993)

Personal information
- Nationality: Norwegian
- Born: 31 August 1993 (age 33) Stranda Municipality, Norway
- Height: 1.68 m (5 ft 6 in)

Sport
- Sport: Handball
- Position: Right wing

Senior clubs
- Years: Team
- 2010–2014: Levanger HK
- 2014–2016: Skrim Kongsberg
- 2016–2019: Larvik HK
- 2019–2021: Molde Elite
- 2021–2022: SCM Craiova
- 2022–2024: HH Elite

Hege Løken (born 31 August 1993) is a former Norwegian handball player who last played for HH Elite.

She was also a part of Norway's recruit team.
