= Berit Hynne =

Norwegian handball player (born 1979)

Personal information
- Nationality: Norwegian
- Born: 10 December 1979 (age 46) Levanger, Norway

Sport
- Sport: Handball
- Position: Centre back

Senior clubs
- Years: Team
- 1996-2009: Levanger HK
National team
Years	Team	Apps	(Gls)
2003	Norway	18	(49)

Berit Hynne (born 10 December 1979) is a Norwegian handball player who played for the club Levanger HK and for the Norway women's national handball team. She played for Levanger HK for 13 years, where she played more than 300 matches and scored more than 1100 goals for the club.

She competed at the 2003 World Women's Handball Championship, and played a total of 18 matches for the national team during her career.

She retired in 2009 due to injuries. In her last match she was part of the team, that narrowly avoided relegation, by beating Sola HK in the relegation play-off.
