= Hafdís Renötudóttir =

Icelandic handball player (born 1997)

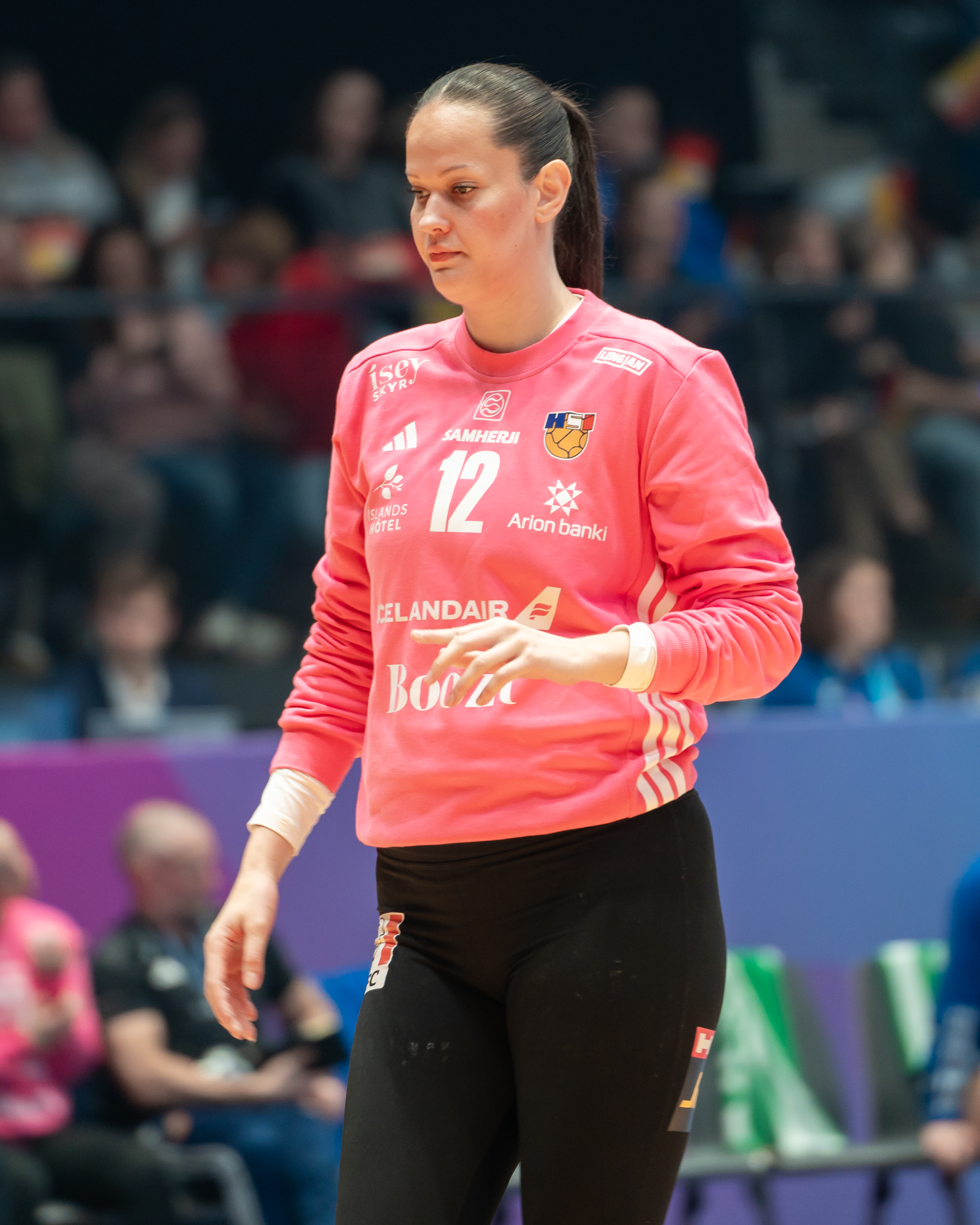

Personal information
- Nationality: Icelandic
- Born: 12 July 1997 (age 29) Reykjavík, Iceland
- Height: 1.92 m (6 ft 4 in)

Sport
- Sport: Handball
- Position: Goalkeeper
- Number: 73

Senior clubs
- Years: Team
- 2013–2016: Fram
- 2016–2017: Stjarnan
- 2017–2018: SønderjyskE
- 2018–2019: Sola HK
- 2019–2020: Fram
- 2020: Lugi HF
- 2021–2023: Fram
- 2023–: Valur
National team
Years	Team	Apps	(Gls)
2017–	Iceland	70	(4)
- Updated on 3 November 2025

Hafdís Renötudóttir (born 12 July 1997) is an Icelandic professional handball player and a member of the Icelandic national team.

== Career ==
Hafdís came up through the junior ranks of Fram but moved to Stjarnan in 2016. She won the Icelandic Cup in 2017 with Stjarnan, where she had 16 saves in the finals game against her former team, Fram.

In 2017 she signed with SønderjyskE Håndbold of the Danish Women's Handball League.

In February 2018, she agreed to sign with Norwegian club Sola HK for the upcoming 2018-2019 Eliteserien season.

On 4 September 2019, Hafdís signed a 2-year contract with Fram. She won the Icelandic Cup with the team and was named the Goalkeeper of the Year.

After not playing at the start of the 2020–21 season due to a concussion, Hafdís signed with Swedish club Lugi HF in October 2020. After a two weeks with the team, she suffered her third concussion in four months and as a result was contemplating retiring from handball.

She rejoined Fram in prior to the 2021–2022 season and helped the team to the national championship. In May 2023, Hafdís signed with Valur.
