= Dröfn Haraldsdóttir =

Icelandic handball player (born 1991)

Personal information
- Nationality: Icelandic
- Born: 8 April 1991 (age 35) Reykjavík
- Height: 1.70 m (5 ft 7 in)

Sport
- Sport: Handball
- Position: Goalkeeper
- Current club: FH
- Number: 16

Senior clubs
- Years: Team
- –: FH
- -2015: ÍBV
- 2015: ÍR
- 2017: Valur
- 2017-2018: Stjarnan
National team
Years	Team	Apps
2012-	Iceland	9
- Updated on 28 April 2019

Dröfn Haraldsdóttir (born 8 April 1991) is an Icelandic handball player for FH and the Icelandic national team.

== Career ==
In January 2015, Dröfn signed with Íþróttafélag Reykjavíkur. In January 2017, she signed with Valur. After the season she signed with Stjarnan.
