= Guðný Jenny Ásmundsdóttir =

Icelandic handball player (born 1982)

Gudný Jenny Ásmundsdóttir
Personal information
- Nationality: Icelandic
- Born: 28 February 1982 (age 44)
- Height: 1.75 m (5 ft 9 in)

Sport
- Sport: Handball
- Position: Goalkeeper

Senior clubs
- Years: Team
- -2014: Valur
- 2016: Fylkir
- 2016-2019: ÍBV
National team
| Years | Team | Apps | (Gls) |
| – | Iceland | 51 | (1) |
- Updated on 27 March 2019

Guðný Jenny Ásmundsdóttir (born 28 February 1982) is an Icelandic team handball player. She currently plays on the Icelandic national team, and participated at the 2011 World Women's Handball Championship in Brazil.

== Playing career ==
After winning the Icelandic championship in 2014, Guðný took a two-year hiatus after child birth. She returned to the court with Fylkir at the end of the 2015–2016 season. After the season she signed with ÍBV.

On 22 March 2019, Guðný tore her achilles in a game with the national team, resulting in her missing the rest of the ÍBV games in the Úrvalsdeild kvenna and the playoffs. On 16 April, ÍBV terminated her contract due to her injuries.
