= Sandra Erlingsdóttir =

Icelandic handball player (born 1998)

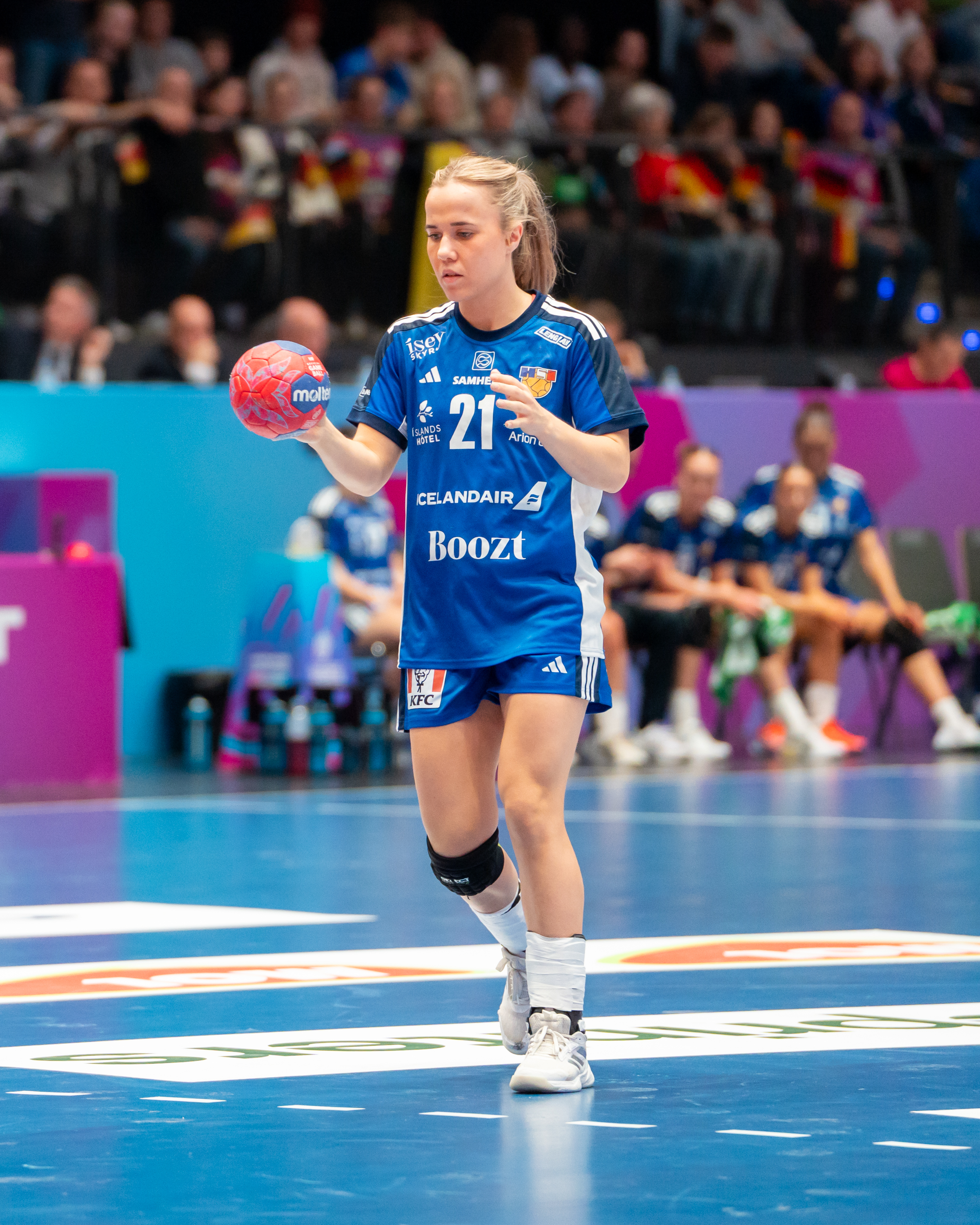

Personal information
- Nationality: Icelandic
- Born: 27 July 1998 (age 28) Iceland
- Height: 1.60 m (5 ft 3 in)

Sport
- Sport: Handball
- Current club: ÍBV
- Number: 21

Senior clubs
- Years: Team
- 2015-2016: Füchse Berlin
- 2016-2018: ÍBV
- 2018-2020: Valur
- 2020: ÍBV
- 2020-2022: EH Aalborg
- 2022-2025: TuS Metzingen
- 2025-: ÍBV
National team
Years	Team	Apps	(Gls)
2018-present	Iceland	33	(145)
- Updated on 3 November 2024

Sandra Erlingsdóttir (born 27 July 1998) is an Icelandic handball player and a member of the Icelandic national team. In 2019 she won the Icelandic championship and the Icelandic Cup as a member of Valur.

== Handball ==
Sandra played her first senior team matches with Füchse Berlin during the 2015–2016 season. She spent the next two seasons with ÍBV before moving to Valur in 2018.

=== Titles ===
- Úrvalsdeild kvenna:
  - Winner (1): 2019
- Icelandic Cup:
  - Winner (1): 2019

== Football ==
Sandra debuted for the ÍBV women's football team in 2013, appearing in two matches in the top-tier Úrvalsdeild kvenna and in one Icelandic Cup match.

== Personal life ==
Sandra was born in 1998 to Erlingur Richardsson, a handball coach and former player, and Vigdís Sigurðardóttir, a former player for the Icelandic national team.
