= Thea Imani Sturludóttir =

Icelandic handball player (born 1997)

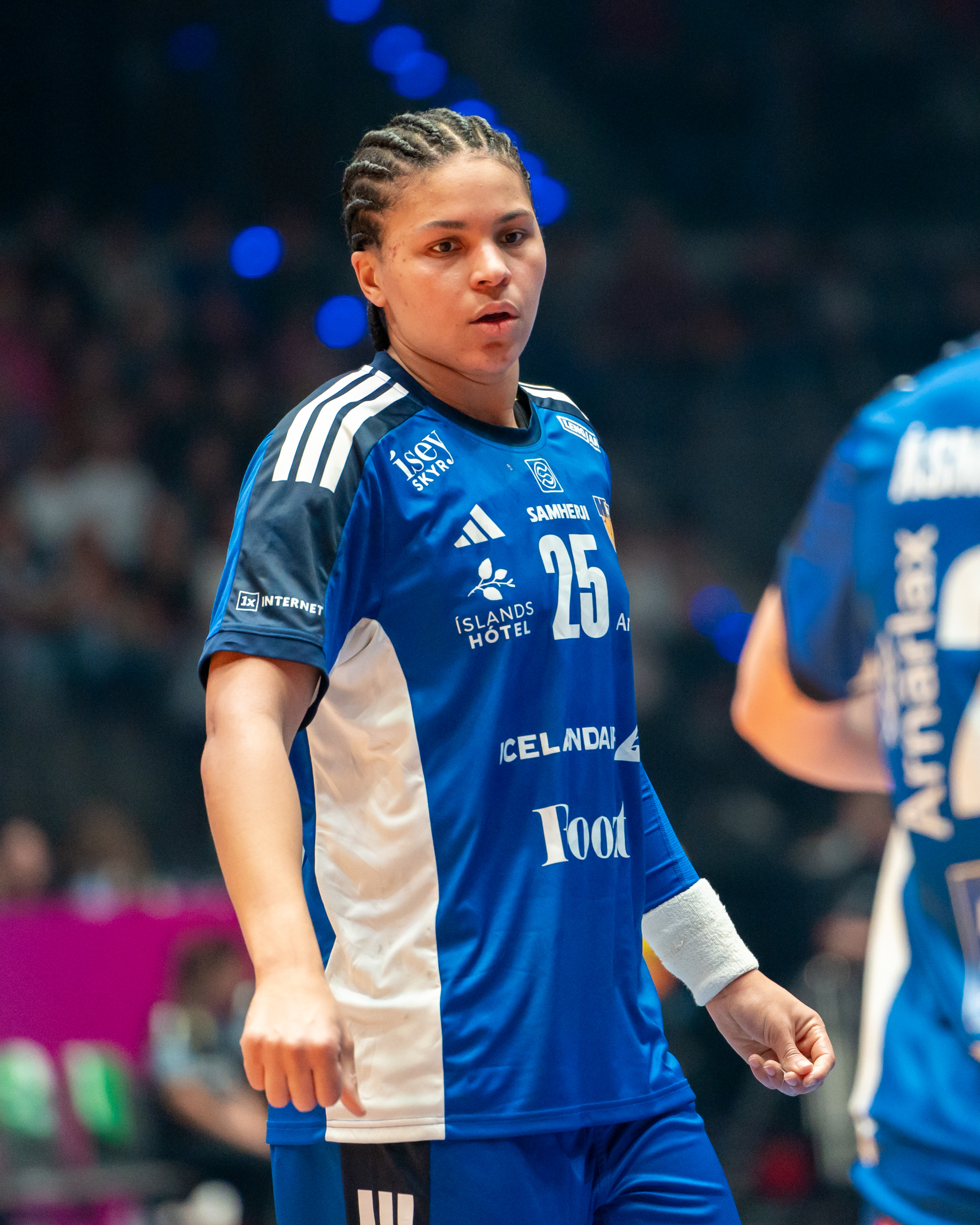
- Sturludóttir in 2025

Personal information
- Nationality: Icelandic
- Born: 21 January 1997 (age 29) Oxford, Great Britain
- Height: 1.79 m (5 ft 10 in)

Sport
- Sport: Handball
- Position: Right back
- Current club: Valur
- Number: 73

Senior clubs
- Years: Team
- –2017: Fylkir
- 2017–2019: Volda Handball
- 2019–2020: Oppsal Håndball
- 2020–2021: Aarhus United
- 2021–: Valur
National team
Years	Team	Apps	(Gls)
–	Iceland	91	(197)
- Updated on 7 November 2025

Thea Imani Sturludóttir (born 21 January 1997) is an Icelandic handball player for the Icelandic national team and Valur.

== Career ==
Thea started playing handball at Fylkir. In 2017 she joined Norwegian third-tier side Volda Handball. In her first season the club was promoted to the second tier. After a year in the second tier, she joined the Norwegian top league team Oppsal Håndball.

In 2020 she joined Danish team Aarhus United. Her time at Aarhus was however plagued by injuries, and just a season later she returned to Iceland to join Valur. Here she won the 2023, 2024 and 2025 Icelandic Championship and the 2024–25 Women's EHF European Cup. This was the first time an Icelandic team won a European title.

== National team ==
Thea played for the various Icelandic youth teams.

She represented Iceland at the 2023 World Women's Handball Championship, where Iceland finished 25th. She scored 27 goals during the tournament. She represented Iceland again two years later at the 2025 World Women's Handball Championship.
