= Volda Handball =

Norwegian handball club

- Full name: Volda Handballklubb
- Founded: 2005 (as Volda Turn og Idrottslag from 1946–2005)
- Arena: Volda Campus Sparebank1 Arena
- Capacity: 2,200
- President: Arild Bakke
- Head coach: Reidar Møistad
- League: 1. divisjon
- 2024/25: 2nd
- Club colours
| Home | Away |

Volda Handball (also known as Volda Handballklubb) is a handball club from Volda Municipality in Møre og Romsdal, Norway. The women's team currently compete in Eliteserien, the top division since its promotion in 2022. Volda is the first ever team from Sunnmøre to qualify for the top division.

== Team ==
=== Current squad ===
Squad for the 2025/26 season

Goalkeeper

- 1 (Norway) Astrid Nøkleby Thoresen
- 12 (Norway) Mathilde Skogemann Bengtson
- 20 (Denmark) Natasja Haugaard Kyndesen

Wingers
LW

- 17 (Norway) Mia Hjertø Alagic
- 23 (Iceland) Dana Björg Guðmundsdóttir

RW

- 17 (Norway) Zoe Diana Jeannette Arlette Afram
- 45 (Norway) Malene Grøttumsbraaten Steinshamn

Line players

- 4 (Norway) Malin Rekkedal Nydahl
- 5 (Norway) Tuva Willmann
- 13 (Norway) Helga Pedersen Lersveen

Back players

- 6 (Norway) Mie Blegen Stensrud
- 10 (Norway) Thea Brænde
- 11 (Norway) Emily Dyrhol Slenes
- 18 (Sweden) Hannele Ebba Nilsson
- 22 (Norway) Aurora Hjelseth-Steen
- 24 (Norway) Julia Hessen
- 25 (Norway) Thea Dyrhol Slenes
- 27 (Norway) Emma Eikrem Klauset
- 32 (Norway) Ine Fremo
- 33 (Norway) Marie Elstrand Munthe
- 34 (Denmark) Sofie Stokkendal Poulsen

=== 2026-27 transfers ===
Joining

Leaving

- (Iceland) Dana Björg Guðmundsdóttir (LW) (to (Norway) Larvik HK)

=== Technical staff ===
- Head coach: Reidar Møistad
- Assistant coach: Mathias Nævestad

=== Notable former National Team players ===
- (Poland) Aleksandra Zimny
- (Iceland) Thea Imani Sturludóttir

=== Notable former club players ===
- (Norway) Ingeborg Furunes
- (Norway) Lone Vik
- (Norway) Fride Heggdal Stølen
- (Norway) Kine Kvalsund
- (Norway) Hanna Ræstad
- (Norway) Aud Ingrid Silseth
- (Ukraine) Iulia Andriichuk
- (Serbia) Jelena Terzic
