= Þorgerður Anna Atladóttir =

Icelandic handball player (born 1992)

Personal information
- Nationality: Icelandic
- Born: 2 June 1992 (age 34) Reykjavík, Iceland
- Height: 176 cm (69 in)

Sport
- Sport: Handball
- Position: Left back

Senior clubs
- Years: Team
- -2011: UMF Stjarnan
- 2011-2013: Valur Reykjavík
- 2013-2014: Flint Tønsberg
- 2014-2016: HC Leipzig
- 2016-2018: UMF Stjarnan
National team
Years	Team	Apps	(Gls)
–	Iceland	23	(11)
- Updated on 26 September 2018

Þorgerður Anna Atladóttir (born 2 June 1992) is an Icelandic former team handball player. She played for the Icelandic national team, and participated at the 2011 World Women's Handball Championship in Brazil. On 28 August 2018, she announced her retirement from handball due to injuries.

== Career ==
She started playing handball at UMF Stjarnan in Iceland. Here she won the Icelandic championship and Icelandic Cup in 2008 and 2009.

In 2011 she moved to Valur Reykjavík, where she once again won back-to-back Icelandic Cups in 2012 and 2013. In 2013 she moved to Norwegian club Flint Tønsberg. In the 2013/2014 she suffered from shoulder injuries and only played 7 games during the season.

In the summer of 2014 she moved to German HC Leipzig. Once again she had shoulder injuries, so her first match for the German club would first come over 6 months later in February 2015 against DJK/MJC Trier. Only 15 days later she suffered a cruciate ligament tear.

In 2016 she returned to Icelandic handball and UMF Stjarnan, where she played two seasons before retiring.
