= Rakel Dögg Bragadóttir =

Icelandic handball player (born 1986)

Personal information
- Nationality: Icelandic
- Born: 24 May 1986 (age 40)
- Height: 1.78 m (5 ft 10 in)

Sport
- Sport: Handball
- Position: Central back
- Current club: Stjarnan

Senior clubs
- Years: Team
- –2008: Stjarnan
- 2008–2009: KIF Vejen
- 2009–2012: Levanger HK
- 2012–2014: Stjarnan
- 2016–2018: Stjarnan
National team
Years	Team	Apps	(Gls)
–	Iceland	102	(304)

Teams managed
- 2019–2020: Stjarnan (assistant)
- 2020–2022: Stjarnan
- 2022–: Frem Reykjavik
- Updated on 25 February 2023

Rakel Dögg Bragadóttir (born 24 May 1986) is an Icelandic handball coach and former player. When she played she was a member of the Icelandic national team which she captained.

== Career ==
She started playing handball for Stjarnan in the Úrvalsdeild kvenna, the top division in Iceland. Here she won the 2007 and 2008 Icelandic Championship and the 2005 and 2008 Icelandic cup.

In 2008 she joined Danish top league team KIF Vejen. Here she reached the Danish Cup final, but lost to Viborg HK.

In November 2009 she transferred to Norwegian side Levanger HK due to concerns over lack of playing time. In 2010 she was a part of the Iceland team, that qualified for the European Women's Handball Championship for the first time ever. She missed the 2011 World Cup due to a cruciate ligament injury.

In 2012 she returned to Sjarnan in Iceland. She initially retired in 2014, but made a comeback in 2016. She last played for Stjarnan in October 2017 when she received a blow to the head and suffered a concussion. She had previously retired in 2014 due to similar head injuries but later returned to the court.

== Coaching career ==
In April 2018, Rakel was hired as the co-head coach of Stjarnan, along with Sebastian Alexandersson. In March 2020 she was promoted to head coach for the club. In January 2022 she left the position, and later the same year at the beginning of the 2022–2023 season she became the assistant coach at league rivals Frem Reykjavik.
