= Anna Úrsúla Guðmundsdóttir =

Icelandic handball player (born 1985)

Personal information
- Nationality: Icelandic
- Born: 1 May 1985 (age 41) Reykjavík, Iceland
- Height: 1.81 m (5 ft 11 in)

Sport
- Sport: Handball
- Position: Line Player
- Current club: Valur

Senior clubs
- Years: Team
- 2002–2005: Grótta KR
- 2005–2008: Íþróttafélagið Grótta
- 2008–2009: Stjarnan
- 2009: Íþróttafélagið Grótta
- 2009–2014: Valur
- 2014–2017: Íþróttafélagið Grótta
- 2018–2019: Valur
- 2021–: Valur
National team
| Years | Team | Apps | (Gls) |
| – | Iceland | 101 | (202) |
Association football career
- Position: Goalkeeper
Senior career*
| Years | Team | Apps | (Gls) |
| 2003 | KR | 2 | (0) |
| 2018 | Valur | 0 | (0) |
| 2021 | Valur | 0 | (0) |
International career
| 2003 | Iceland U19 | 1 | (0) |
- * Club domestic league appearances and goals
- Updated on 26 February 2018

Anna Úrsúla Guðmundsdóttir (born 1 May 1985) is an Icelandic handballer and footballer. She won the Icelandic championship eight times and the Icelandic Handball Cup five times during her career.

== Handball ==
=== Career ===
In July 2011, Anna moved to Hungarian club Érdi VSE, but was later released from her contract by mutual agreement without playing a game.

Anna won the Icelandic championship with Grótta in 2015 and 2016. She served as a player/assistant coach for Grótta during the 2016–2017 season.

After sitting for the first half of the 2017–2018 season due to the birth of her second child, Anna signed with Valur in January 2018.

After missing the 2019–2020 season, she announced her retirement from competitive handball in April 2020.

On 27 February 2021, she returned to Valur and played in its 20–21 loss to ÍBV. On 31 March 2021, it was announced that she had been selected to the national team ahead of its two games against Slovenia. She appeared in the second game, scoring three goals in her first national team game in six years.

=== Awards, titles and accomplishments ===
==== Titles ====
- Icelandic champion: 2010, 2011, 2012, 2014, 2015, 2016, 2019, 2023, 2024
- Icelandic Handball Cup: 2012, 2013, 2014, 2015, 2019

==== Individual awards ====
- Úrvalsdeild kvenna Defense Player of the Year: 2014

== Football ==
Anna played two games for KR in the Icelandic top-tier women's football league in 2003. She was twice an unused substitute goalkeeper for Valur during the 2018 season. On 6 July 2021, she was again an unused substitute goalkeeper for Valur in its 2–1 victory against Selfoss in the Úrvalsdeild kvenna, replacing Fanney Inga Birkisdóttir who was away with the junior national teams.
