= Arnhild Holmlimo =

Norwegian handball player (born 1983)

Personal information
- Born: 7 May 1983 (age 43) Verdal Municipality, Norway
- Years active: -2013
- Height: 174 cm (5 ft 9 in)

Sport
- Country: Norway (beach handball)
- Sport: Handball, beach handball
- Club: Levanger, Bækkelaget, Nordstrand, Oppsal

Arnhild Holmlimo
Medal record

Beach handball

Representing Norway

Beach Handball World Championships
Bronze medal – third place	2012 Muscat	Senior
Gold medal – first place	2010 Antalya	Senior

European Beach Handball Championship
Bronze medal – third place	2013 Randers	Senior
Silver medal – second place	2009 Larvik	Senior
Bronze medal – third place	2007 Misano Adriatico	Senior

Arnhild Holmlimo (born 7 May 1983) is a retired Norwegian handball player, who played both handball and beach handball.

She played for Oppsal IF in the 2012/13 season, and represented Norway at European and world championships before retiring in 2013.

== Career ==
Holmlimo has played for Verdal, Varden and Stjørdals-Blink, and played for many years at Levanger HK in the first division, where she was the league's third highest scoring player in the 2004/05 season, with 186 goals. After moving to Bækkelaget, where she was promoted to the highest division in 2005, she played two seasons there until 2007. In the summer of 2007, she moved to Nordstrand, and played there for three seasons, until 2010.

In 2007, Holmlimo played three games for the Norway Norges B-team in handball.

Holmlimo took part in the 2008 Beach Handball World Championships, where Norway finished sixth. She was part of the Norwegian team which took silver at the 2009 European Beach Handball Championship, and the team that won gold at the 2010 Beach Handball World Championships. In 2010, she also took part in the Police European Handball Championships, where Norway finished second, and she was named in the tournament's Allstar team.

She returned to Levanger HK for a short period in October 2010, but only played two matches there before she ended her handball career. In autumn 2011 she made a brief comeback for the German team TV Granzach Handball in the 3. Bundesliga. She played for Levanger again from January to March 2012, and in September 2012, moved to Oppsal IF, where she played for the 2013 season.

At the 2012 Beach Handball World Championships she was part of the Norwegian team that won bronze. In July 2013, she took part in the 2013 European Beach Handball Championship in Randers, Denmark. Norway took bronze, after winning the third-place playoff 2-1 against Ukraine. After this championship, she ended her handball career.
