= Emma Hawia Svensson =

Swedish handball player (born 1990)

Personal information
- Nationality: Swedish
- Born: 10 December 1990 (age 35) Mariefred, Sweden
- Height: 1.71 m (5 ft 7 in)

Sport
- Sport: Handball
- Position: Right wing
- Number: 13

Senior clubs
- Years: Team
- 2005–2009: BK Göksten
- 2009–2017: Skuru IK
National team
Years	Team	Apps	(Gls)
2012–2016	Sweden	16	(18)

Emma Hawia Svensson (born 10 December 1990) is a retired Swedish handball player, who last played for Skuru IK and the Swedish national team.
