= Hrafnhildur Skúladóttir =

Icelandic handballer and coach (born 1977)

Personal information
- Nationality: Icelandic
- Born: 9 August 1977 (age 49) Reykjavík, Iceland
- Height: 1.77 m (5 ft 10 in)

Sport
- Sport: Handball
- Position: Left back
- Current club: ÍBV

Senior clubs
- Years: Team
- -2004: TTH Holstebro
- 2004-2007: SK Aarhus
- 2007-2008: Hadsten Håndbold
- 2008-2015: Valur
National team
Years	Team	Apps	(Gls)
–	Iceland	170	(620)

Teams managed
- 2015-2019: ÍBV
- Updated on 25 February 2018

Hrafnhildur Ósk Skúladóttir (born 9 August 1977) is an Icelandic former team handball player and coach.

From 2015 to 2019 she was the head coach of ÍBV women's handball team. She played on the Icelandic national team and participated at the 2011 World Women's Handball Championship in Brazil.
