= Aleksandra Zimny =

Polish handball player (born 1996)

Personal information
- Nationality: Polish
- Born: 21 May 1996 (age 30) Szczecin, Poland
- Height: 1.88 m (6 ft 2 in)

Sport
- Sport: Handball
- Position: Left back
- Current club: Storhamar HE
- Number: 26

Senior clubs
- Years: Team
- 2013–2017: Pogoń Baltica Szczecin
- 2017-2018: Storhamar HE
- 2018-2020: Volda Handball
- 2020-2023: JKS Jarosław
- 2023-: SCM Gloria Buzău
National team
Years	Team	Apps	(Gls)
2018-	Poland	25	(26)
- Updated on 7 November 2023

Aleksandra Zimny (born 21 May 1996) is a Polish handball player for Storhamar HE and has played for the Polish national team.
