= Dushica Gjorgjievska =

Macedonian handball player

Personal information
- Nationality: Macedonian
- Born: 28 December 1987 (age 38)
- Height: 1.77 m (5 ft 10 in)

Sport
- Sport: Handball
- Position: Left back
- Current club: Zağnos SK
- Number: 19
National team
Years	Team	Apps	(Gls)
–	Macedonia	37	(46)
- Updated on 4 December 2012

Dushica Gjorgjievska (Macedonian: Душица Ѓорѓиевска; born 28 December 1987) is a retired Macedonian handball player that played for Turkish club Zağnos SK and the Macedonian national team.
