= Mariya Basarab =

Russian handball player

Personal information
- Nationality: Russian
- Born: 19 January 1990 (age 36)
- Height: 1.83 m (6 ft 0 in)

Sport
- Sport: Handball
- Position: Goalkeeper
- Current club: Rostov-Don
National team
Years	Team	Apps	(Gls)
–	Russia	3	(0)
- Updated on 4 December 2012

Mariya Aleksandrovna Basarab (Russian: Мария Александровна Басараб; born 19 January 1990) is a Russian handball player for Rostov-Don and the Russian national team.
