= Gino Strezovski =

Macedonian handball coach

Gino Strezovski (born 2 November 1959) is a Macedonian handball coach for the Macedonian women's national team.
