= Arna Sif Pálsdóttir =

Icelandic handball player (born 1988)

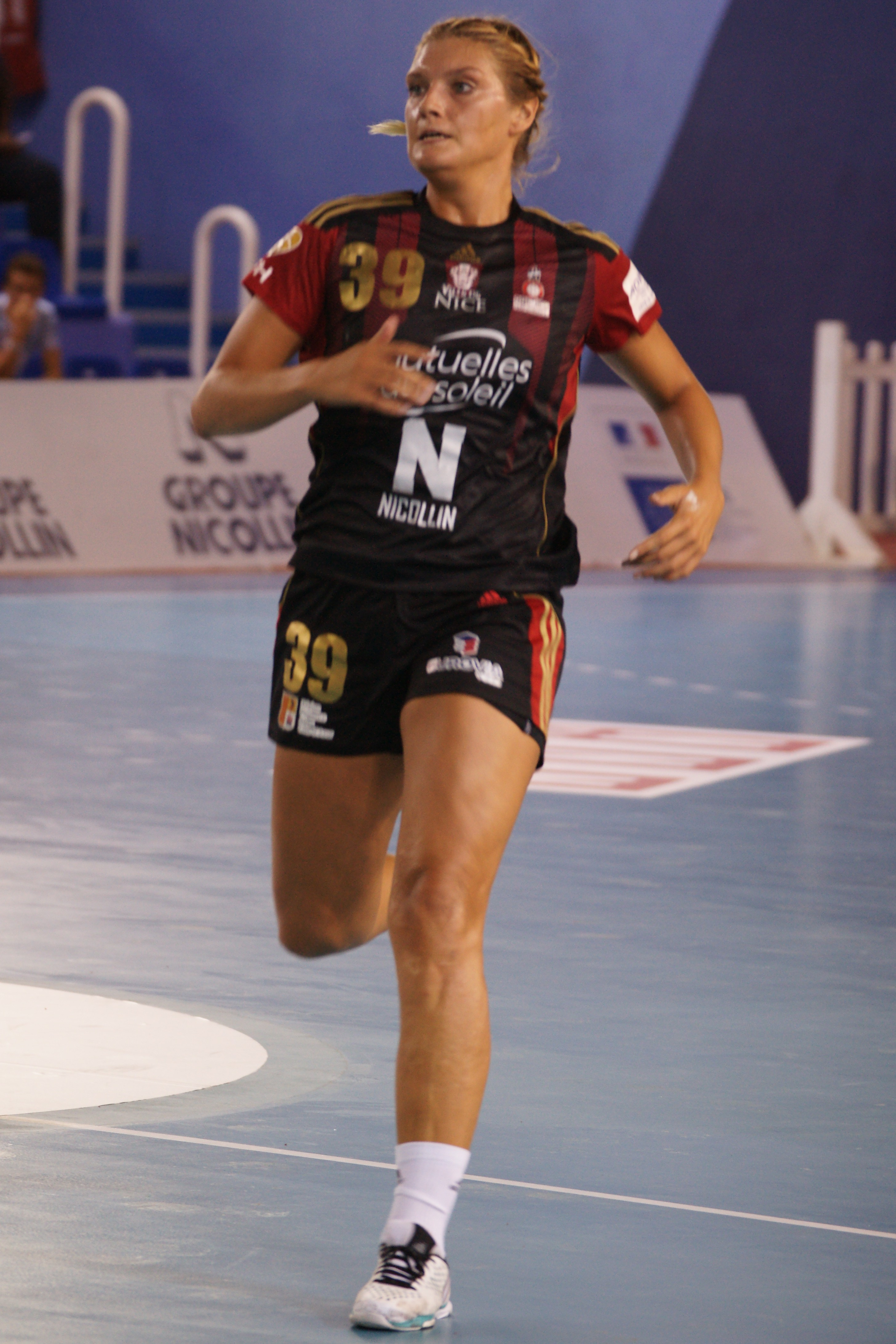

Personal information
- Nationality: Icelandic
- Born: 5 January 1988 (age 38) Heimaey, Iceland
- Height: 1.84 m (6 ft 0 in)

Sport
- Sport: Handball
- Position: Pivot
- Current club: Valur
- Number: 39

Senior clubs
- Years: Team
- 2005–2009: HK
- 2009-2010: Horsens HK
- 2010-2011: Team Esbjerg
- 2011-2013: Aalborg DH
- 2013-2015: SK Aarhus
- 2015-2017: OGC Nice
- 2017–2018: Debreceni VSC
- 2018–2019: ÍBV
- 2019–: Valur
National team
Years	Team	Apps	(Gls)
2006–present	Iceland	128	(199)
- Updated on 24 March 2019

Arna Sif Pálsdóttir (born 5 January 1988) is an Icelandic team handball player for Valur of the Úrvalsdeild kvenna. She plays on the Icelandic national team, and participated at the 2011 World Women's Handball Championship in Brazil.

== Club career ==
Arna came up through the junior ranks of HK and played with the senior team from 2005 to 2009. She played for Horsens HK during the 2009–2010 season, appearing in 20 games in the Danish Damehåndboldligaen and scoring 19 goals. After Horsens was relegated, she signed with rival Team Esbjerg.

In June 2017, Arna signed with Debreceni VSC. After nine seasons away, Arna returned to Iceland in June 2018 and signed with ÍBV of the Úrvalsdeild kvenna.

== National team career ==
Arna sif played her first game for the Icelandic national team in 2006.
