= Dominika Selucká =

Czech handball player

Personal information
- Nationality: Czech
- Born: 13 December 1988 (age 37)
- Height: 1.75 m (5 ft 9 in)

Sport
- Sport: Handball
- Position: Pivot
- Current club: DHC Slavia Prague
- Number: 24
National team
Years	Team	Apps	(Gls)
–	Czech Republic	28	(14)

Dominika Selucká (born 13 December 1987) is a Czech handballer player for DHC Slavia Prague and the Czech national team.
