= Levanger HK =

Norwegian handball club

- Full name: Levanger Håndballklubb
- Short name: LHK
- Founded: April 3, 1990; 36 years ago
- Arena: Trønderhallen
- Capacity: ca. 2000
- President: May Hilde Settenø
- League: Postenligaen
- 2023-24: 10th
- Club colours
Home	Away

Levanger Håndboldklubb, normally called Levanger HK, is a Norwegian women's handball club from Levanger, Trøndelag. It was founded on April 2nd 1990 as an elite addition to Frol Idrettslag og Sportsklubben Nessegutten.

In 2006 they were promoted to the Norwegian top league, Postenligaen, but where relegated again in 2014. They have played multiple seasons in European competitions. Their best result is reaching the semifinal of the EHF Women's Cup Winners' Cup in 2008-09.

== Notable former players ==
- (Norway) Berit Hynne
- (Norway) Arnhild Holmlimo
- (Norway) Silje Katrine Svendsen
- (Norway) June Andenæs
- (Norway) Ane Eidem
- (Norway) Vilde Eidem
- (Norway) Hege Løken
- (Norway) Hanna Yttereng
- (Norway) Mari Molid
- (Iceland) Rakel Dögg Bragadóttir
- (Hungary) Gabriella Juhász
- (Poland) Izabela Duda
- (Sweden) Åsa Mogensen
