= Anna Redka =

Ukrainian handball player

Personal information
- Nationality: Ukrainian
- Born: 21 January 1989 (age 37) Kiev, Ukraine
- Height: 1.66 m (5 ft 5 in)

Sport
- Sport: Handball
- Position: Right wing

Senior clubs
- Years: Team
- 2006–2012: HC Spartak Kyiv
- 2012–2020: HC Gomel
National team
Years	Team	Apps	(Gls)
–	Ukraine	10	(13)

Anna Redka (born 21 January 1989) is a former Ukrainian handball player for Ukrainian national team.
