= Dragica Mitrova =

Macedonian handball player

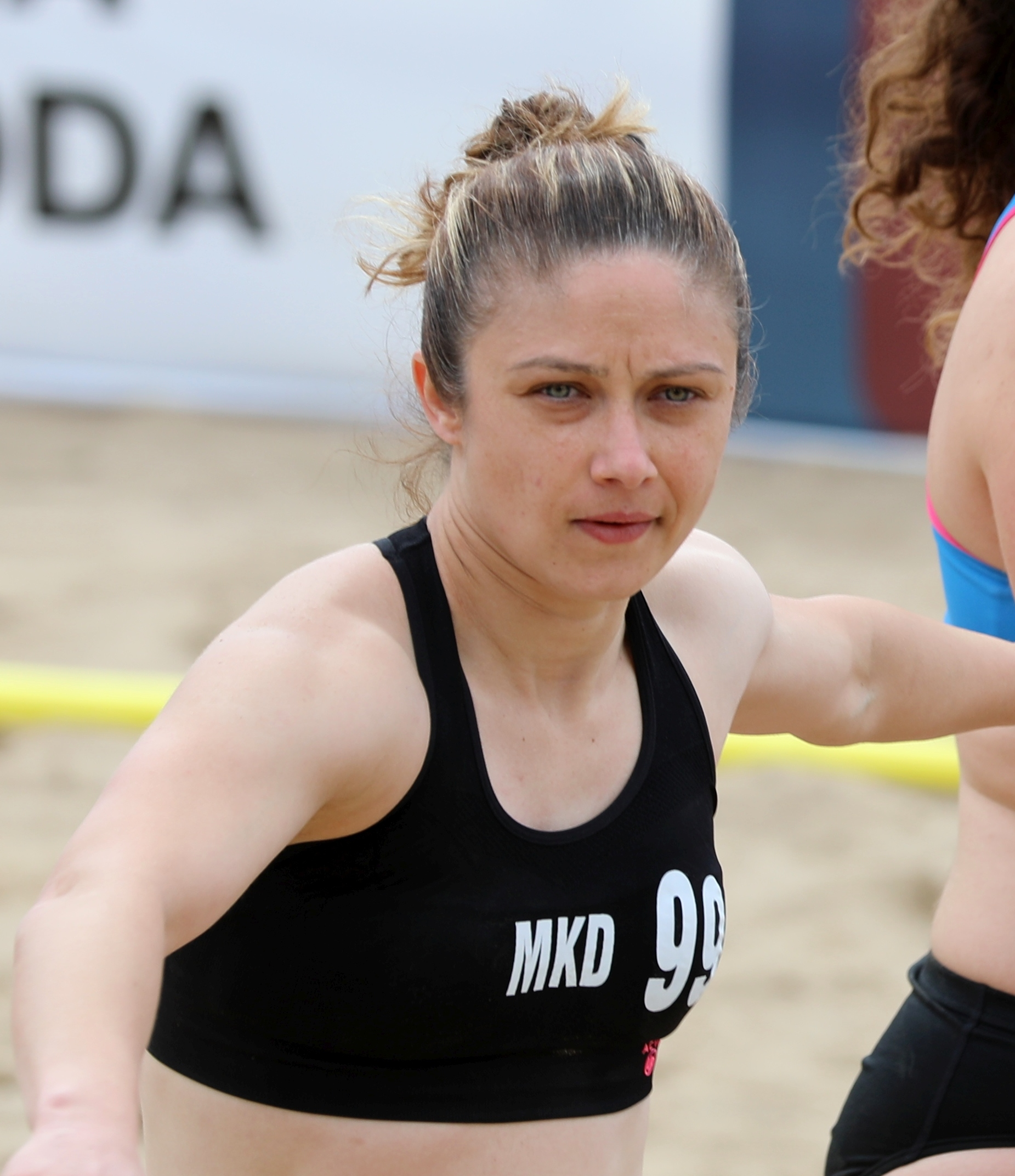

Personal information
- Nationality: Macedonian
- Born: 5 November 1987 (age 38) Gevgelija
- Height: 1.63 m (5 ft 4 in)

Sport
- Sport: Handball
- Position: Left wing
- Current club: ŽRK Metalurg
- Number: 99
National team
Years	Team	Apps	(Gls)
–	Macedonia	11	(9)
- Updated on 4 December 2012

Dragica Mitrova (born 5 November 1987) is a retired Macedonian handball player that played for ŽRK Metalurg and the Macedonian national team.
