= Iveta Matoušková =

Czech handball player (born 1987)

Personal information
- Nationality: Czech
- Born: 5 January 1987 (age 39)
- Height: 1.87 m (6 ft 2 in)

Sport
- Sport: Handball
- Position: Pivot
- Current club: Start Elbląg
- Number: 14
National team
Years	Team	Apps	(Gls)
–	Czech Republic	8	(1)
- Updated on 4 December 2012

Iveta Matoušková (born 5 January 1987) is a Czech handballer player for Start Elbląg and the Czech national team.
