= Hana Martínková =

Czech handball player

Hana Martinková
Personal information
- Nationality: Czech
- Born: 16 September 1985 (age 41)
- Height: 1.90 m (6 ft 3 in)

Sport
- Sport: Handball
- Position: Left back
- Current club: Baník Most
- Number: 17
National team
| Years | Team | Apps | (Gls) |
| – | Czech Republic | 28 | (94) |
- Updated on 4 December 2012

Hana Martinková (born 16 September 1985) is a Czech handball player for Baník Most and the Czech national team.
