= Kateřina Keclíková =

Czech handballer Coach in Sokol Písek (born 1986)

Kateřina Hromádková (Keclíková)
Personal information
- Nationality: Czech
- Born: 26 June 1986 (age 40) Písek, Czechoslovakia
- Height: 1.71 m (5 ft 7 in)

Sport
- Sport: Handball
- Position: Coach
- Current club: Sokol Písek
National team
Years	Team	Apps	(Gls)
–	Czech Republic	47	(59)

Kateřina Hromádková (Keclíková) (born 26 June 1986) is a Czech handballer Coach in Sokol Písek.
