= Valur (women's handball) =

Icelandic handball club

- Full name: Knattspyrnufélagið Valur
- Short name: Valur
- Founded: 1948
- Arena: Origo-höllin (Origo arena)
- Capacity: 2,000
- Head coach: Anton Rúnarsson
- League: Úrvalsdeild kvenna
- 2024-25: 1st
Home	Away

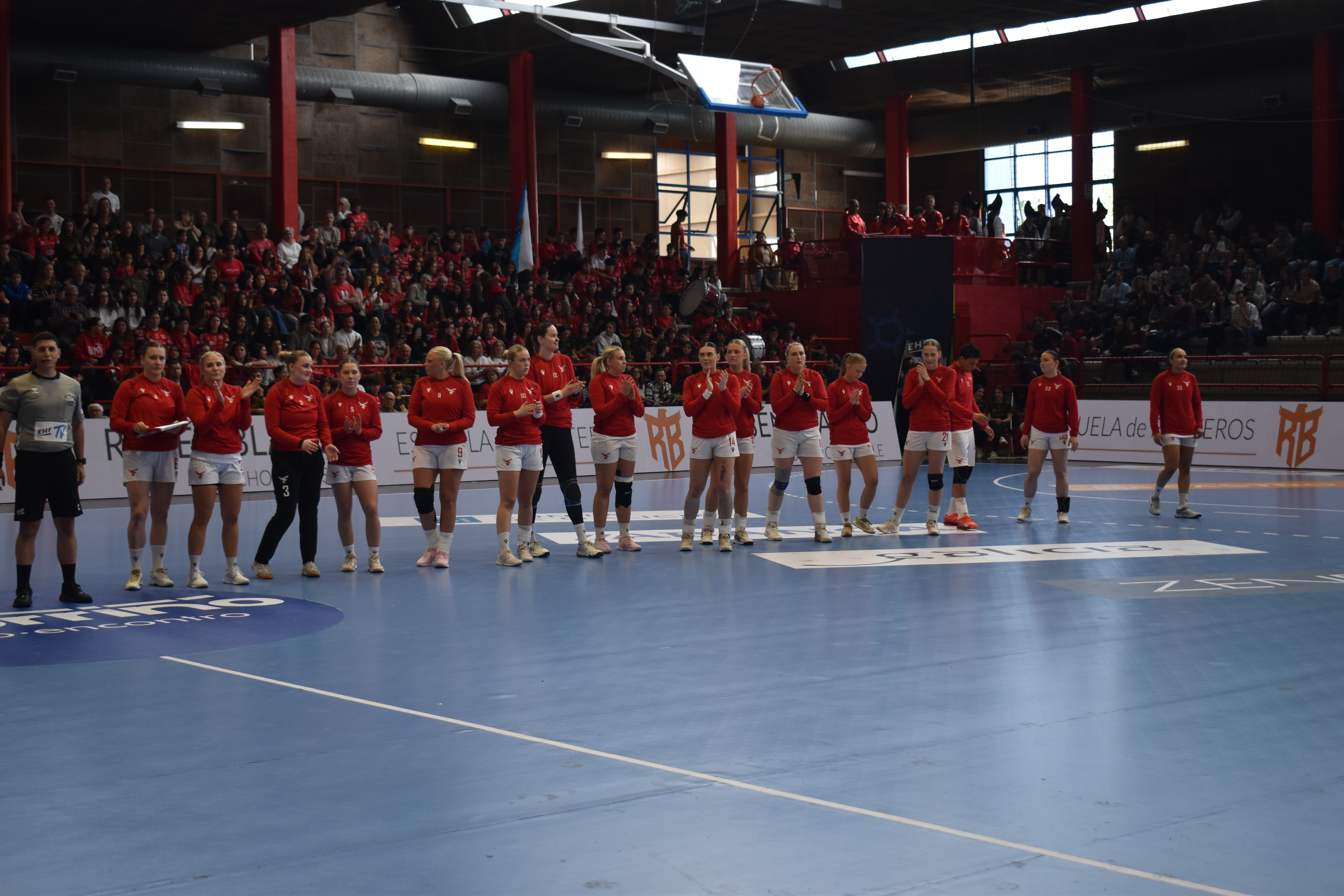
Valur players (2025).

The Valur women's handball team, commonly known as Valur, is the women's handball department of the Knattspyrnufélagið Valur multi-sport club. It has won the Icelandic championship 17 times.

== History ==
In 2019, Valur won the Icelandic Cup for the 7th time and the national championship for the 17th time, the later after beating Fram in the Úrvalsdeild finals 3–0.

In 2025, the team won the 2024–25 Women's EHF European Cup for the first title after beating Spanish Conservas Orbe Zendal BM Porriño in the final.

== Titles ==
- Úrvalsdeild kvenna
  - Winner (20) : 1962, 1964, 1965, 1966, 1967, 1968, 1969, 1971, 1972, 1973, 1975, 1983, 2010, 2011, 2012, 2014, 2019, 2023, 2024, 2025
- Icelandic Women's Handball Cup
  - Winner (8) : 1988, 1993, 2000, 2012, 2013, 2014, 2019, 2022
- EHF Women's European Cup
  - Winner (1) : 2025

== European record ==
Season	Competition	Round	Club	Home	Away	Aggregate
2004–05	EHF Cup	R1	(Sweden) Önnereds HK	24–35	26–30	50–65
2005–06	Challenge Cup	1/8	(Greece) HC Athinaikos Athens	37–29	24–26	61–55
2005–06	Challenge Cup	1/4	(Switzerland) LC Brühl Handball	25–21	32–27	57–48
2005–06	Challenge Cup	1/2	(Romania) CSU Tomis Constanța	35–28	25–37	60–65
2007–08	Challenge Cup	R3	(Serbia) ŽORK Napredak Kruševac	40–18	34–20	74–38
2007–08	Challenge Cup	1/8	(Serbia) RK Lasta Radnički Petrol Beograd	31–30	31–26	62–56
2007–08	Challenge Cup	1/4	(France) Mérignac Handball	24–23	30–36	54–58
2010–11	EHF Cup	R1	(Slovakia) IUVENTA Michalovce	26–21	30–30	56–51
2010–11	EHF Cup	R2	(Germany) VfL Oldenburg	28–26	25–36	53–62
2012–13	EHF Cup	R2	(Spain) Valencia Aicequip	37–25	27–22	64–47
2012–13	EHF Cup	R3	(Romania) HC Zalău	24–23	21–22	45–45
2018–19	Challenge Cup	R3	(Netherlands) Virto/Quintus	20–21	20–24	40–45

== Team ==
=== Current squad ===
Squad for the 2025-26 season

Goalkeepers

- 3 (Iceland) Sara Helgadóttir
- 12 (Iceland) Hafdís Renötudóttir
- 14 (Iceland) Elísabet Milly Elíasardóttir

Wingers
RW

- 10 (Iceland) Þórey Anna Ásgeirsdóttir
- 23 (Iceland) Sara Lind Fróðadóttir

LW

- 8 (Iceland) Guðrún Ásta Magnúsdóttir
- 22 (Iceland) Alba Mist Gunnarsdóttir
- 18 (Iceland) Eva Steinsen Jónsdóttir

Line players

- 6 (Iceland) Hildur Björnsdóttir
- 11 (Iceland) Ágústa Rún Jónasdóttir
- 14 (Iceland) Elísa Elíasdóttir

Back players
LB

- 21 (Iceland) Ásrún Inga Arnardóttir
- 24 (Iceland) Mariam Eradze
- 35 (Iceland) Lovisa Thompson

CB

- 4 (Iceland) Laufey Helga Óskarsdóttir
- 13 (Iceland) Ásdís Þóra Ágústsdóttir
- 20 (Iceland) Arna Karítas Eiríksdóttir

RB

- 15 (Iceland) Guðrún Hekla Traustadóttir
- 25 (Iceland) Thea Imani Sturludóttir

== Notable players ==
- (Iceland) Anna Úrsúla Guðmundsdóttir
- (Iceland) Dagný Skúladóttir
- (Iceland) Dröfn Haraldsdóttir
- (Iceland) Guðný Jenny Ásmundsdóttir
- (Iceland) Hildigunnur Einarsdóttir
- (Iceland) Lovísa Thompson
- (Iceland) Ragnhildur Rósa Guðmundsdóttir
- (Iceland) Sandra Erlingsdóttir
- (Iceland) Þorgerður Anna Atladóttir
- (Iceland) Arna Sif Pálsdóttir
