= Vitaly Krokhin =

Russian handball coach

Vitaly Pavlovich Krokhin (Russian: Виталий Павлович Крохин; born 19 August 1947) is a Russian handball coach of the Russian women's national team.

Being a disciple of the school of Kuban handball, keeper of their game roles, Krokhin by going to coaching twice with Valentin Shiyan SKIF Krasnodar led to victory in the championships of the USSR and the conquest of the EHF Cup. In the mid-nineties, he goes to work in women's handball and Istochnik Rostov leads to victory in the championship of Russia. As the head coach of a new team coach Krokhin outputs it from the highest to the Super League, where the club from Zvenigorod becomes the bronze medal in their debut season, and then, as the second coach of the team, headed by Yevgeni Trefilov leads it to victory in the national championship, EHF Cup and Champions League. However Trefilov Vitaly Krokhin worked in the Russian national team in its victory years.

In 2012-2013, he was the first acting and then a full-fledged head coach of the Russian women's national team. Quick rule Krokhin ended in confusion with the span of past World Cup.
