= Dagný Skúladóttir =

Icelandic handball player (born 1980)

Personal information
- Nationality: Icelandic
- Born: 10 May 1980 (age 46) Reykjavik, Iceland
- Height: 1.68 m (5 ft 6 in)

Sport
- Sport: Handball
- Position: Left wing

Senior clubs
- Years: Team
- –: Valur
National team
| Years | Team | Apps | (Gls) |
| – | Iceland | 119 | (274) |
- Updated on 28 April 2019

Dagný Skúladóttir (born 10 May 1980) is an Icelandic former team handball player. She played on the Icelandic national team, and participated at the 2011 World Women's Handball Championship in Brazil. In 2013, she was named the Úrvalsdeild kvenna Player of the Year.

== National team career ==
Dagný played 119 games for the Icelandic national handball team, scoring 274 goals.
