= Savica Mrkić =

Macedonian handball player

Personal information
- Nationality: Macedonian
- Born: 26 September 1991 (age 35)
- Height: 1.83 m (6 ft 0 in)

Sport
- Sport: Handball
- Position: Left back
- Current club: AC Life Style Erice
- Number: 6
National team
Years	Team	Apps	(Gls)
–	Macedonia	7	(15)
- Updated on 4 December 2012

Savica Mrkić (born 26 September 1991) is a Macedonian handball player for Italian handball team AC Life Style Erice and the Macedonian national team.
