= Stjarnan (women's handball) =

Icelandic handball club

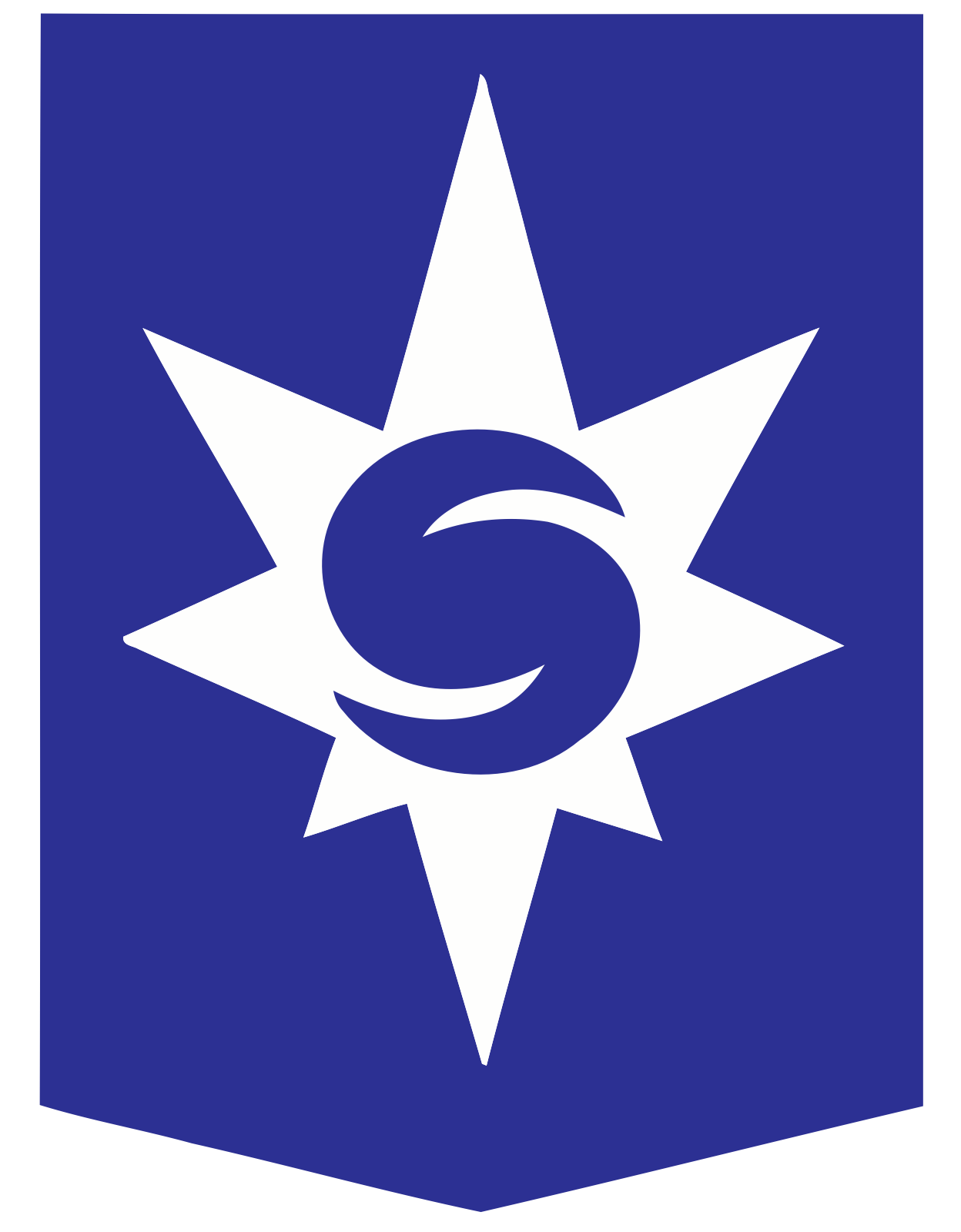
- Full name: Ungmennafélagið Stjarnan
- Short name: Stjarnan
- Arena: TM-höllin
- Capacity: 2,000
- Chairman: Pétur Bjarnason
- Head coach: Rakel Dögg Bragadóttir
- League: Úrvalsdeild kvenna
- 2020-21: 5th
- Club colours
Home	Away

The Stjarnan women's handball team is the women's handball department of Ungmennafélagið Stjarnan multi-sport club. As of the 2021–21-2018 season, they are competing in the Úrvalsdeild kvenna and the current head coach is former National team player Rakel Dögg Bragadóttir, since March 2020.

The team won the Icelandic Cup in 2016.

== Trophies and achievements ==
- Icelandic champions (7):
  - 1991, 1995, 1998, 1999, 2007, 2008, 2009
- Icelandic Handball Cup (8):
  - 1989, 1996, 1998, 2005, 2008, 2009, 2016, 2017
- Division II (3):
  - 2005^{1}, 2006^{1}, 2007^{1}

^{1} B-team

== Team ==
=== Current squad ===
Squad for the 2021-22 season

Goalkeepers

- 25 (Iceland) Tinna Húnbjörg Einarsdóttir
- 98 (Montenegro) Darija Zecevic

Wingers
LW

- 8 (Iceland) Anna Karen Hansdóttir
- 14 (Iceland) Stefanía Theodórsdóttir

RW

- 6 (Iceland) Sonja Lind Sigsteinsdóttir
- 15 (Iceland) Hanna Guðrún Stefánsdóttir

Line players

- 17 (Iceland) Elísabet Gunnarsdóttir
- 21 (Iceland) Elena Elísabet Birgisdóttir
- 24 (Iceland) Þórhildur Gunnarsdóttir

Back players
LB

- 7 (Iceland) Karen Tinna Demian
- 19 (Iceland) Katla María Magnúsdóttir

CB

- 9 (Senegal) Britney Emilie Florianne Cots
- 11 (Iceland) Helena Örvarsdóttir
- 20 (Iceland) Eva Björk Davíðsdóttir

RB

- 18 (Iceland) Ásthildur Bertha Bjarkadóttir
- 23 (Iceland) Lena Margrét Valdimarsdóttir
