= Iceland women's national handball team =

Iceland

Information
- Association: Icelandic Handball Association (Handknattleikssamband Íslands)
- Coach: Arnar Pétursson
- Assistant coach: Óskar Bjarni Óskarsson
- Most caps: Hrafnhildur Ósk Skúladóttir (170)
- Most goals: Hrafnhildur Ósk Skúladóttir (620)

Colours
1st	2nd

Results

World Championship
- Appearances: 3 (First in 2011)
- Best result: 12th (2011)

European Championship
- Appearances: 3 (First in 2010)
- Best result: 15th (2010, 2012)
- Last updated on Unknown.

The Iceland women's national handball team is the national handball team of Iceland and takes part in international team handball competitions. They qualified to the 2010 European Women's Handball Championship. This was the first time they qualified to any international championship. They finished with the 15th place. Two years later, at the 2012 European Women's Handball Championship, they managed the same results.

Second time they qualified to international championship were when they qualified to the 2011 World Women's Handball Championship.

== Results ==
=== World Championship ===
- 2011 – 12th place
- 2023 – 25th place
- 2025 – 21st place

=== European Championship ===
Year	Round	Position	GP	W	D	L	GS	GA
(Germany) 1994	Did not qualify							
(Denmark) 1996	Did not qualify							
(Netherlands) 1998	Did not qualify							
(Romania) 2000	Did not qualify							
(Denmark) 2002	Did not qualify							
(Hungary) 2004	Did not qualify							
(Sweden) 2006	Did not qualify							
(North Macedonia) 2008	Did not qualify							
(Denmark) (Norway) 2010	Preliminary round	15th place	3	0	0	3	69	91
(Serbia) 2012	Preliminary round	15th place	3	0	0	3	56	78
(Hungary) (Croatia) 2014	Did not qualify							
(Sweden) 2016	Did not qualify							
(France) 2018	Did not qualify							
(Denmark) (Norway) 2020	Did not qualify							
(Slovenia) (North Macedonia) (Montenegro) 2022	Did not qualify							
(Austria) (Hungary) (Switzerland) 2024	Preliminary round	16th place	3	1	0	2	71	81
(Czech Republic) (Poland) (Romania) (Slovakia) (Turkey) 2026	Qualified							
(Denmark) (Norway) (Sweden) 2028	TBD							
(Belgium) (France) 2030	TBD							
(Denmark) (Germany) (Poland) 2032	TBD							
Total	3/20	–	9	1	0	8	196	250

== Squad ==
The squad chosen for the 2026 European Women's Handball Championship.

Head coach: Arnar Pétursson

No.	Pos.	Name	Date of birth (age)	Height	App.	Goals	Club
7	RW	Díana Dögg Magnúsdóttir	19 September 1997 (age 29)	1.75 m	77	104	(Germany) HSG Blomberg-Lippe
9	LW	Lilja Ágústsdóttir	30 April 2004 (age 22)	1.70 m	29	24	(Germany) BSV Sachsen Zwickau
12	GK	Hafdís Renötudóttir	12 July 1997 (age 29)	1.93 m	82	5	(Iceland) Valur
14	P	Elísa Elíasdóttir	31 July 2004 (age 22)	1.76 m	35	34	(Iceland) Valur
17	CB	Elín Klara Þorkelsdóttir	14 September 2004 (age 22)	1.69 m	39	165	(Sweden) IK Sävehof
19	CB	Lovisa Thompson	27 October 1999 (age 27)	1.72 m	43	79	(Portugal) S.L. Benfica
20	GK	Sara Sif Helgadóttir	8 June 2000 (age 26)	1.71 m	27	0	(Iceland) Haukar Handball
21	CB	Sandra Erlingsdóttir	27 July 1998 (age 28)	1.60 m	51	212	(Iceland) ÍBV
22	CB	Elín Rósa Magnúsdóttir	22 October 2002 (age 24)	1.67 m	44	93	(Germany) HSG Blomberg-Lippe
24	RW	Katrín Anna Ásmundsdóttir	4 July 2004 (age 22)	1.70 m	26	42	(Iceland) Fram
25	RB	Thea Imani Sturludóttir	21 January 1997 (age 29)	1.79 m	100	233	(Romania) SCM Craiova
33	P	Katrín Tinna Jensdóttir	31 July 2002 (age 24)	1.81 m	39	48	(Denmark) HH Elite
34	LB	Alfa Brá Oddsdóttir Hagalín	27 April 2005 (age 21)	1.80 m	18	11	(Germany) Thüringer HC
36	RW	Sonja Lind Sigsteinsdóttir	14 January 2004 (age 22)	1.70 m	9	8	(Iceland) Haukar Handball
37	LW	Rakel Oddný Guðmundsdóttir	26 June 2004 (age 22)	1.68 m	16	19	(Iceland) Haukar Handball
43	CB	Matthildur Lilja Jónsdóttir	13 September 2004 (age 22)	1.76 m	13	1	(Iceland) ÍR
45	LB	Sara Dögg Hjaltadóttir	3 July 2000 (age 26)	1.79 m	9	13	(Iceland) ÍR

=== Coaching staff ===
Role	Name
Head coach	(Iceland) Arnar Pétursson
Assistant coach	(Iceland) Ágúst Þór Jóhannsson
Team manager	(Iceland) Þorbjörg Jóhanna Gunnarsdóttir
Goalkeeping coach	(Iceland) Hlynur Morthens
Physiotherapist	(Iceland) Ágústa Sigurjónsdóttir
Physiotherapist	(Iceland) Særún Jónsdóttir
Doctor	(Iceland) Jóhann Róbertsson

=== Famous players ===
- Rakel Dögg Bragadóttir
- Hrafnhildur Skúladóttir
- Hanna Guðrún Stefánsdóttir
- Anna Úrsúla Guðmundsdóttir
- Karen Knútsdóttir
- Rut Arnfjörð Jónsdóttir
- Arna Sif Pálsdóttir
- Þórey Rósa Stefánsdóttir
- Dagný Skúladóttir
- Anna Úrsúla Guðmundsdóttir
- Stella Sigurðardóttir
- Hildur Þorgeirsdóttir
- Steinunn Björnsdóttir
