= 2006 European Women's Handball Championship squads =

The following squads and players competed in the European Women's Handball Championship in 2006 in Sweden.

== Austria ==
1. Natalia Rusnachenko
2. Gabriela Rotis-Nagy
3. Katrin Engel
4. Sorina Teodorovic
5. Simona Spiridon
6. Tanja Logvin
7. Marina Budecevic
8. Corinna Flandorfer
9. Stefanie Ofenböck
10. Petra Blazek
11. Laura Magelinskas
12. Isabell Plach
13. Monika Richter
14. Sabrina Thurner
15. Nina Stumvoll
16. Elisabeth Herbst

== Croatia ==
1. Ivana Jelcic
2. Maida Arslanagic
3. Svitlana Pasicnik
4. Maja Zebic
5. Bozica Palcic
6. Anita Gace
7. Ivanka Hrgovic
8. Maja Koznjak
9. Nikica Pusic
10. Jelena Grubisic
11. Lidija Horvat
12. Ivana Lovric
13. Vesna Milanovic Litre
14. Andrea Penezic
15. Dijana Batelka
16. Ana Krizanac
17. Nina Jukopila

== Denmark ==
1. Katrine Fruelund
2. Henriette Rønde Mikkelsen
3. Lene Thomsen
4. Kristina Bille-Hansen
5. Anette Bonde Christensen
6. Kamilla Kristensen
7. Lene Lund Nielsen
8. Rikke Skov
9. Malene Dalgaard
10. Louise Bager Due
11. Karin Mortensen
12. Louise Mortensen
13. Rikke Nielsen
14. Rikke Petersen-Schmidt
15. Mette Sjøberg
16. Trine Troelsen
17. Louise Svalastog

== France ==
1. Isabelle Wendling
2. Stephanie Cano
3. Paule Baudouin
4. Siraba Dembele
5. Nina Kamto Njitam
6. Angelique Spincer
7. Christiane Vanparys Torres
8. Maakan Tounkara
9. Sophie Herbrecht
10. Ludivine Jacquinot
11. Alexandra Lacrabere
12. Stephanie Lambert
13. Valerie Nicolas
14. Veronique Pecqueux-Rolland
15. Linda Pradel
16. Raphaelle Tervel
17. Katty Piejos

== Germany ==
1. Nadine Krause
2. Maren Baumbach
3. Grit Jurack
4. Stefanie Melbeck
5. Anja Althaus
6. Nadine Härdter
7. Anne Müller
8. Nora Reiche
9. Angie Geschke
10. Alexandra Gräfer
11. Anna Loerper
12. Sabrina Neukamp
13. Nina Wörz
14. Clara Woltering
15. Silke Meier
16. Sabine Englert

== Hungary ==
1. Ibolya Mehlmann
2. Mónika Kovacsicz
3. Erika Kirsner
4. Bernadett Ferling
5. Piroska Szamoránsky
6. Gabriella Szűcs
7. Anita Görbicz
8. Ágnes Hornyák
9. Eszter Siti
10. Tímea Tóth
11. Orsolya Vérten
12. Zsanett Borbély
13. Orsolya Herr
14. Katalin Pálinger
15. Beatrix Balogh
16. Rita Borbás

== Macedonia ==
1. Alegra Vernalise Oholanga Loki
2. Marina Naukovich
3. Valentina Radulovic
4. Natasa Kocevska
5. Biljana Crvenkoska
6. Dragana Pecevska
7. Tanja Andrejeva
8. Andrijana Atanasovska
9. Klara Boeva
10. Elena Gjeorgjievska
11. Olga Kolesnik
12. Natasha Mladenovska
13. Anzela Platon Dimovska
14. Julija Portjanko
15. Lenche Ilkova
16. Veselinka Zasovska

== Netherlands ==
1. Diane Lamein
2. Saskia Mulder
3. Joyce Hilster
4. Irina Pusic
5. Maura Visser
6. Arjenne Paap
7. Miranda Robben
8. Evelien van der Koelen
9. Pearl van der Wissel
10. Andrea Groot
11. Silvia Hofman
12. Willemijn Karsten
13. Debbie Klijn
14. Joke Nynke Tienstra

== Norway ==
1. Gro Hammerseng
2. Kari Mette Johansen
3. Ragnhild Aamodt
4. Marit Malm Frafjord
5. Kristine Lunde
6. Tonje Nöstvold
7. Anette Hovind Johansen
8. Else Marthe Sörlie Lybekk
9. Karoline Dyhre Breivang
10. Katja Nyberg
11. Linn Kristina Riegelhuth
12. Kari Aalvik Grimsbö
13. Katrine Lunde
14. Göril Snorroeggen
15. Terese Pedersen
16. Anne Kjersti Suvdal
17. Marianne Rokne

== Poland ==
1. Sabina Kubisztal
2. Kinga Polenz
3. Aleksandra Jacek
4. Dagmara Kowalska
5. Malgorzata Majerek
6. Agata Wypych
7. Ewa Damiecka
8. Izabela Duda
9. Dorota Malczewska
10. Karolina Siodmiak
11. Kaja Zaleczna
12. Karolina Kudlacz
13. Iwona Lacz
14. Agnieszka Jochymek
15. Magdalena Chemicz

== Russia ==
1. Liudmila Bodnieva
2. Zhanna Yakovleva
3. Anna Kareeva
4. Elena Polenova
5. Irina Poltoratskaya
6. Ekaterina Andryushina
7. Irina Bliznova
8. Liudmila Postnova
9. Ekaterina Marennikova
10. Oxana Romenskaya
11. Natalia Shipilova
12. Maria Sidorova
13. Inna Suslina
14. Emiliya Turey
15. Polina Vyahiryeva
16. Olga Levina

== Serbia ==
1. Marina Rokic
2. Marina Dmitrovic
3. Jovana Bartosic
4. Jelena Eric
5. Ivana Mladenovic
6. Tatjana Medved
7. Slavica Koperec
8. Sanja Damnjanovic
9. Sladjana Djeric
10. Sladjana Grozdanic
11. Branka Jovanovic
12. Andrea Lekic
13. Nada Micic
14. Ana Vojcic
15. Ivana Filipovic
16. Katarina Vojcic

== Slovenia ==
1. Sergeja Stefanisin
2. Anja Freser
3. Tatjana Oder
4. Mojca Dercar
5. Vesna Pus
6. Mihaela Ciora
7. Manuela Hrnjic
8. Kristina Mihic
9. Tina Sotler
10. Anja Argenti
11. Nataliya Derepasko
12. Silvana Ilic
13. Katja Kurent Tatarovac
14. Misa Marincek
15. Katja Cerenjak

== Spain ==
1. Aitziber Elejaga Vargas
2. Marta Mangue Gonzales
3. Macarena Aguilar Diaz
4. Susana Fraile Celaya
5. Christina Lopez Quiros
6. Noelia Oncina Moreno
7. Isabel Ortuno Torrico
8. Yolanda Sanroman Elexpuru
9. Diana Box Alonso
10. Sara Castro Ramirez
11. Begona Fernandez Molinos
12. Cristina Gonzalez Ramos
13. Beatriz Morales Tendero
14. Patricia Pinedo Saenz
15. Silvia Navarro Gimenez
16. Eider Rubio Ponce

== Sweden ==
1. Jessica Enström
2. Linnea Torstensson
3. Terese Krantz
4. Tina Flognman
5. Annika Wiel Freden
6. Matilda Boson
7. Asa Könsberg
8. Therese Brorsson
9. Katarina Chrifi
10. Sara Eriksson
11. Madeleine Grundström
12. Sara Holmgren
13. Fanny Lagerström
14. Johanna Wiberg
15. Helena Andersson
16. Therese Islas Helgesson
17. Petra Skogsberg

== Ukraine ==
1. Olena Tsyhytsia
2. Oksana Sakada
3. Natalya Lyapina
4. Olena Radchenko
5. Oksana Raykhel
6. Olena Reznir
7. Irina Sheyenko
8. Regina Shymkute
9. Marina Verhelyuk-Stri
10. Marija Boklashchuk
11. Maria Makarenko
12. Irina Shybanova
13. Viktoria Tymoshenkova
14. Olena Yatsenko
15. Olga Layuk
