= Handball at the 2008 Summer Olympics =

Tournament details
- Host country: China
- Venues: 2 (in 1 host city)
- Dates: 9–24 August 2008
- Teams: 24 (from 4 confederations)

Final positions
- Champions: France (men); Norway (women)
- Runners-up: Iceland (men); Russia (women)
- Third place: Spain (men); South Korea (women)
- Fourth place: Croatia (men); Hungary (women)

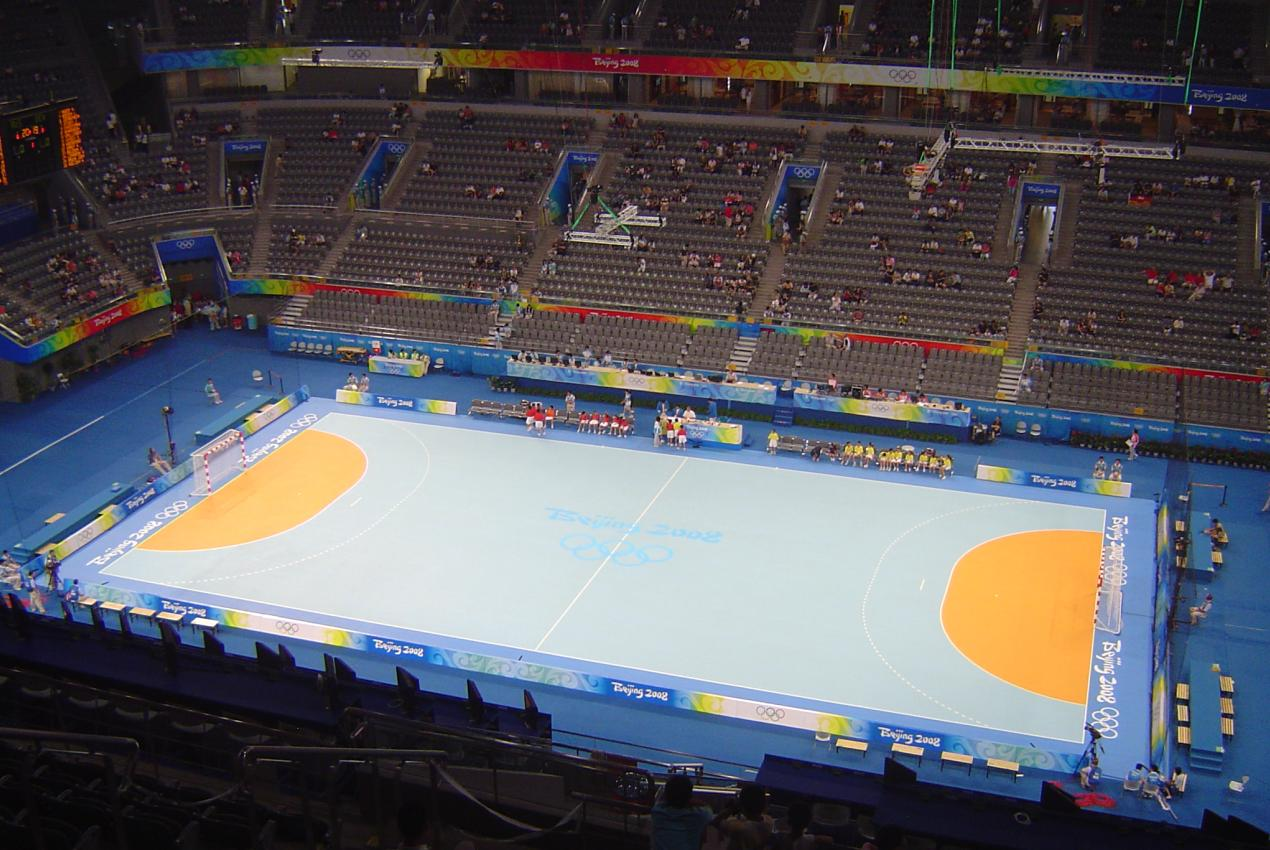
The Beijing National Indoor Stadium prepared for the final handball matches.

Handball competitions at the 2008 Summer Olympics were held from 9 to 24 August at the Olympic Sports Centre Gymnasium and National Indoor Stadium. Medals were awarded for both men's and women's team events. A National Olympic Committee was permitted to enter one men's team and one women's team in the handball competitions.

== Medal summary ==
Event	Gold	Silver	Bronze
Men	France; Luc Abalo; Joël Abati; Cédric Burdet; Didier Dinart; Jérôme Fernandez; Bertrand Gille; Guillaume Gille; Olivier Girault; Michaël Guigou; Nikola Karabatić; Daouda Karaboué; Christophe Kempe; Daniel Narcisse; Thierry Omeyer; Cédric Paty	Iceland; Sturla Ásgeirsson; Arnór Atlason; Logi Geirsson; Snorri Guðjónsson; Hreiðar Guðmundsson; Róbert Gunnarsson; Björgvin Páll Gústavsson; Ásgeir Örn Hallgrímsson; Ingimundur Ingimundarson; Sverre Andreas Jakobsson; Alexander Petersson; Guðjón Valur Sigurðsson; Sigfús Sigurðsson; Ólafur Stefánsson	Spain; David Barrufet; Jon Belaustegui; David Davis; Alberto Entrerríos; Raúl Entrerríos; Rubén Garabaya; Juanín García; José Javier Hombrados; Demetrio Lozano; Cristian Malmagro; Carlos Prieto; Albert Rocas; Iker Romero; Víctor Tomás
Women	Norway; Ragnhild Aamodt; Karoline Dyhre Breivang; Marit Malm Frafjord; Gro Hammerseng; Katrine Lunde Haraldsen; Kari Aalvik Grimsbø; Kari Mette Johansen; Tonje Larsen; Kristine Lunde; Else-Marthe Sørlie Lybekk; Tonje Nøstvold; Katja Nyberg; Linn-Kristin Riegelhuth; Gøril Snorroeggen	Russia; Yekaterina Andryushina; Irina Bliznova; Yelena Dmitriyeva; Anna Kareyeva; Yekaterina Marennikova; Yelena Polenova; Irina Poltoratskaya; Lyudmila Postnova; Oxana Romenskaya; Natalia Shipilova; Maria Sidorova; Inna Suslina; Emiliya Turey; Yana Uskova	South Korea; An Jung-Hwa; Bae Min-Hee; Choi Im-Jeong; Hong Jeong-ho; Huh Soon-Young; Kim Cha-Youn; Kim Nam-Sun; Kim On-a; Lee Min-Hee; Moon Pil-Hee; Oh Seong-Ok; Oh Yong-Ran; Park Chung-Hee; Song Hai-Rim

== Participating teams ==
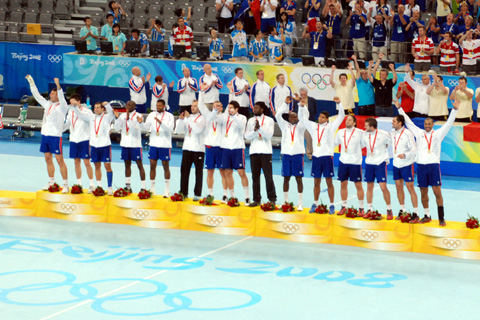
Gold medalists France collect their medals on 24 August 2008.

=== Men ===
Group A

- Brazil
- China
- Croatia
- France
- Poland
- Spain

Group B

- Denmark
- Egypt
- Germany
- Iceland
- Russia
- South Korea

=== Women ===
Group A

- Angola
- China
- France
- Kazakhstan
- Norway
- Romania

Group B

- Brazil
- Germany
- Hungary
- Russia
- South Korea
- Sweden
