= 2007 World Women's Handball Championship =

2007 edition of the World Women's Handball Championship

Tournament details
- Host country: France
- Venues: 11 (in 11 host cities)
- Dates: 2–16 December
- Teams: 24 (from 5 confederations)

Final positions
- Champions: Russia (3rd title)
- Runners-up: Norway
- Third place: Germany
- Fourth place: Romania

Tournament statistics
- Matches played: 92
- Goals scored: 5,084 (55.26 per match)
- Top scorer: (Germany) Grit Jurack (85 goals)

Awards
- Best player: (Norway) Katja Nyberg

The 2007 World Women's Handball Championship was the 18th edition of the international championship tournament in women's team sport handball that is governed by the International Handball Federation (IHF). France hosted the event from 2–16 December 2007. A total of 24 teams participated in the tournament. Russia successfully contested Norway in the final, regaining the title after having lost it at the 2005 final.

== Venues ==
City	Stadium	Capacity	Matches
Beauvais	L'Elispace	2,800	IHF President Cup
Dijon	Palais des Sports de Dijon	3,900	Main Tour
Lyon	Palais des Sports de Gerland	5,100	Preliminary round
Metz	Arènes de Metz	4,800	Main Tour
Nantes	Palais des Sports de Beaulieu	4,500	Preliminary round
Nîmes	Le Parnasse	4,000	Preliminary round
Paris	Palais omnisports de Paris-Bercy	14,000	Final
Pau	Palais des Sports de Pau	6,500	Preliminary round
Plaisir	Palais des Sports Pierre de Coubertin	1,260	IHF President Cup
Saint-Brieuc	Salle Steredenn	2,400	Preliminary round
Toulon	Palais des Sports de Toulon	4,200	Preliminary round

Source: IHF.info

== Qualification ==
Competition	Dates	Host	Vacancies	Qualified
Host nation			1	France
2005 World Championship	5–18 December 2005	(Russia) Saint Petersburg	1	Russia
2006 African Championship	12–20 January 2006	Tunisia	3	Angola; Tunisia; Congo
2006 Asian Championship	1–5 July 2006	(China) Guangzhou	4	South Korea; China; Japan; Kazakhstan
2006 European Championship	7–17 December 2006	Sweden	3	Norway; Germany; Hungary
2007 Pan American Championship	31 May – 4 June 2007	(Dominican Republic) Santo Domingo	4	Brazil; Argentina; Dominican Republic; Paraguay
2007 Oceania Championship	5–6 June 2007	(Australia) Sydney	1	Australia
European qualification	28 November 2006 – 10 June 2007	Various	7	Austria; Croatia; Ukraine; Macedonia; Poland; Romania; Spain

== Preliminary round ==
The draw for the preliminary round took place in Paris on 20 June 2007.

=== Group A ===
Pos	Team	Pld	W	D	L	GF	GA	GD	Pts	Qualification
1	France (H)	3	3	0	0	96	58	+38	6	Main round
2	Croatia	3	2	0	1	96	71	+25	4	Main round
3	Kazakhstan	3	1	0	2	71	88	−17	2	
4	Argentina	3	0	0	3	52	98	−46	0	

Source: IHF
Rules for classification: 1) points; 2) head-to-head points; 3) head-to-head goal difference; 4) head-to-head number of goals scored; 5) goal difference.
(H) Hosts

2 December 2007; 17:00	Croatia	35–25	Kazakhstan	Palais des Sports de Pau, Pau; Attendance: 6,500
2 December 2007; 17:00		(16–12)		Palais des Sports de Pau, Pau; Attendance: 6,500
2 December 2007; 17:00		Report		Palais des Sports de Pau, Pau; Attendance: 6,500

2 December 2007; 19:00	France	37–12	Argentina	Palais des Sports de Pau, Pau; Attendance: 6,500
2 December 2007; 19:00		(18–8)		Palais des Sports de Pau, Pau; Attendance: 6,500
2 December 2007; 19:00		Report		Palais des Sports de Pau, Pau; Attendance: 6,500

3 December 2007; 18:30	Argentina	18–35	Croatia	Palais des Sports de Pau, Pau; Attendance: 6,100
3 December 2007; 18:30		(7–16)		Palais des Sports de Pau, Pau; Attendance: 6,100
3 December 2007; 18:30		Report		Palais des Sports de Pau, Pau; Attendance: 6,100

3 December 2007; 20:30	Kazakhstan	20–31	France	Palais des Sports de Pau, Pau; Attendance: 6,500
3 December 2007; 20:30		(12–17)		Palais des Sports de Pau, Pau; Attendance: 6,500
3 December 2007; 20:30		Report		Palais des Sports de Pau, Pau; Attendance: 6,500

4 December 2007; 18:30	Argentina	22–26	Kazakhstan	Palais des Sports de Pau, Pau; Attendance: 5,000
4 December 2007; 18:30		(12–14)		Palais des Sports de Pau, Pau; Attendance: 5,000
4 December 2007; 18:30		Report		Palais des Sports de Pau, Pau; Attendance: 5,000

4 December 2007; 20:30	France	28–26	Croatia	Palais des Sports de Pau, Pau; Attendance: 6,500
4 December 2007; 20:30		(14–11)		Palais des Sports de Pau, Pau; Attendance: 6,500
4 December 2007; 20:30		Report		Palais des Sports de Pau, Pau; Attendance: 6,500

=== Group B ===
Pos	Team	Pld	W	D	L	GF	GA	GD	Pts	Qualification
1	Russia	3	2	1	0	98	60	+38	5	Main round
2	Macedonia	3	2	0	1	78	62	+16	4	Main round
3	Brazil	3	1	1	1	89	66	+23	3	
4	Australia	3	0	0	3	29	106	−77	0	

Source: IHF
Rules for classification: 1) points; 2) head-to-head points; 3) head-to-head goal difference; 4) head-to-head number of goals scored; 5) goal difference.

2 December 2007; 15:00	Brazil	36–9	Australia	Salle Steredenn, Saint-Brieuc; Attendance: 2,400
2 December 2007; 15:00		(21–6)		Salle Steredenn, Saint-Brieuc; Attendance: 2,400
2 December 2007; 15:00		Report		Salle Steredenn, Saint-Brieuc; Attendance: 2,400

2 December 2007; 17:00	Russia	27–22	Macedonia	Salle Steredenn, Saint-Brieuc; Attendance: 2,400; Referees: Geipel, Helbig (GER)
2 December 2007; 17:00	Polenova 6	(12–14)	Oholanga Loki, Radulović 6	Salle Steredenn, Saint-Brieuc; Attendance: 2,400; Referees: Geipel, Helbig (GER)
2 December 2007; 17:00	3× (yellow card) 4× (suspension)	Report	3× (yellow card) 3× (suspension)	Salle Steredenn, Saint-Brieuc; Attendance: 2,400; Referees: Geipel, Helbig (GER)

3 December 2007; 18:30	Australia	7–40	Russia	Salle Steredenn, Saint-Brieuc; Attendance: 2,050; Referees: Caçador, Nicolau (POR)
3 December 2007; 18:30	Hudson-Gofers 2	(4–22)	Dmitriyeva 9	Salle Steredenn, Saint-Brieuc; Attendance: 2,050; Referees: Caçador, Nicolau (POR)
3 December 2007; 18:30	3× (yellow card) 2× (suspension)	Report	3× (yellow card) 1× (suspension)	Salle Steredenn, Saint-Brieuc; Attendance: 2,050; Referees: Caçador, Nicolau (POR)

3 December 2007; 20:30	Macedonia	26–22	Brazil	Salle Steredenn, Saint-Brieuc; Attendance: 2,500
3 December 2007; 20:30		(10–11)		Salle Steredenn, Saint-Brieuc; Attendance: 2,500
3 December 2007; 20:30		Report		Salle Steredenn, Saint-Brieuc; Attendance: 2,500

4 December 2007; 18:30	Macedonia	30–13	Australia	Salle Steredenn, Saint-Brieuc; Attendance: 2,300
4 December 2007; 18:30		(12–9)		Salle Steredenn, Saint-Brieuc; Attendance: 2,300
4 December 2007; 18:30		Report		Salle Steredenn, Saint-Brieuc; Attendance: 2,300

4 December 2007; 20:30	Russia	31–31	Brazil	Salle Steredenn, Saint-Brieuc; Attendance: 2,500; Referees: Geipel, Helbig (GER)
4 December 2007; 20:30	Bliznova 10	(13–16)	Silva 7	Salle Steredenn, Saint-Brieuc; Attendance: 2,500; Referees: Geipel, Helbig (GER)
4 December 2007; 20:30	3× (yellow card) 5× (suspension)	Report	4× (yellow card) 4× (suspension)	Salle Steredenn, Saint-Brieuc; Attendance: 2,500; Referees: Geipel, Helbig (GER)

=== Group C ===
Pos	Team	Pld	W	D	L	GF	GA	GD	Pts	Qualification
1	Norway	3	3	0	0	107	65	+42	6	Main round
2	Angola	3	2	0	1	100	74	+26	4	Main round
3	Austria	3	1	0	2	74	85	−11	2	
4	Dominican Republic	3	0	0	3	58	115	−57	0	

Source: IHF
Rules for classification: 1) points; 2) head-to-head points; 3) head-to-head goal difference; 4) head-to-head number of goals scored; 5) goal difference.

2 December 2007; 14:30	Austria	32–19	Dominican Republic	Palais des Sports de Gerland, Lyon; Attendance: 4,800
2 December 2007; 14:30		(18–9)		Palais des Sports de Gerland, Lyon; Attendance: 4,800
2 December 2007; 14:30		Report		Palais des Sports de Gerland, Lyon; Attendance: 4,800

2 December 2007; 16:30	Norway	32–26	Angola	Palais des Sports de Gerland, Lyon; Attendance: 4,800
2 December 2007; 16:30		(18–14)		Palais des Sports de Gerland, Lyon; Attendance: 4,800
2 December 2007; 16:30		Report		Palais des Sports de Gerland, Lyon; Attendance: 4,800

3 December 2007; 19:15	Dominican Republic	19–42	Norway	Palais des Sports de Gerland, Lyon; Attendance: 4,800
3 December 2007; 19:15		(9–18)		Palais des Sports de Gerland, Lyon; Attendance: 4,800
3 December 2007; 19:15		Report		Palais des Sports de Gerland, Lyon; Attendance: 4,800

3 December 2007; 21:15	Angola	33–22	Austria	Palais des Sports de Gerland, Lyon; Attendance: 4,800
3 December 2007; 21:15		(16–11)		Palais des Sports de Gerland, Lyon; Attendance: 4,800
3 December 2007; 21:15		Report		Palais des Sports de Gerland, Lyon; Attendance: 4,800

4 December 2007; 19:15	Norway	33–20	Austria	Palais des Sports de Gerland, Lyon; Attendance: 5,000
4 December 2007; 19:15		(19–13)		Palais des Sports de Gerland, Lyon; Attendance: 5,000
4 December 2007; 19:15		Report		Palais des Sports de Gerland, Lyon; Attendance: 5,000

4 December 2007; 21:15	Angola	41–20	Dominican Republic	Palais des Sports de Gerland, Lyon; Attendance: 5,000
4 December 2007; 21:15		(20–10)		Palais des Sports de Gerland, Lyon; Attendance: 5,000
4 December 2007; 21:15		Report		Palais des Sports de Gerland, Lyon; Attendance: 5,000

=== Group D ===
Pos	Team	Pld	W	D	L	GF	GA	GD	Pts	Qualification
1	Romania	3	3	0	0	108	83	+25	6	Main round
2	Poland	3	2	0	1	89	81	+8	4	Main round
3	Tunisia	3	1	0	2	74	95	−21	2	
4	China	3	0	0	3	76	88	−12	0	

Source: IHF
Rules for classification: 1) points; 2) head-to-head points; 3) head-to-head goal difference; 4) head-to-head number of goals scored; 5) goal difference.

2 December 2007; 15:00	Poland	29–23	Tunisia	Palais des Sports de Toulon, Toulon; Attendance: 4,200
2 December 2007; 15:00		(16–11)		Palais des Sports de Toulon, Toulon; Attendance: 4,200
2 December 2007; 15:00		Report		Palais des Sports de Toulon, Toulon; Attendance: 4,200

2 December 2007; 17:00	Romania	31–29	China	Palais des Sports de Toulon, Toulon; Attendance: 4,200
2 December 2007; 17:00		(15–16)		Palais des Sports de Toulon, Toulon; Attendance: 4,200
2 December 2007; 17:00		Report		Palais des Sports de Toulon, Toulon; Attendance: 4,200

3 December 2007; 18:30	Tunisia	21–39	Romania	Palais des Sports de Toulon, Toulon; Attendance: 2,100
3 December 2007; 18:30		(11–17)		Palais des Sports de Toulon, Toulon; Attendance: 2,100
3 December 2007; 18:30		Report		Palais des Sports de Toulon, Toulon; Attendance: 2,100

3 December 2007; 20:30	China	20–27	Poland	Palais des Sports de Toulon, Toulon; Attendance: 2,100
3 December 2007; 20:30		(10–15)		Palais des Sports de Toulon, Toulon; Attendance: 2,100
3 December 2007; 20:30		Report		Palais des Sports de Toulon, Toulon; Attendance: 2,100

4 December 2007; 18:30	China	27–30	Tunisia	Palais des Sports de Toulon, Toulon; Attendance: 3,500
4 December 2007; 18:30		(14–14)		Palais des Sports de Toulon, Toulon; Attendance: 3,500
4 December 2007; 18:30		Report		Palais des Sports de Toulon, Toulon; Attendance: 3,500

4 December 2007; 20:30	Romania	38–33	Poland	Palais des Sports de Toulon, Toulon; Attendance: 3,800
4 December 2007; 20:30		(18–20)		Palais des Sports de Toulon, Toulon; Attendance: 3,800
4 December 2007; 20:30		Report		Palais des Sports de Toulon, Toulon; Attendance: 3,800

=== Group E ===
Pos	Team	Pld	W	D	L	GF	GA	GD	Pts	Qualification
1	Hungary	3	2	1	0	94	77	+17	5	Main round
2	Spain	3	2	1	0	91	79	+12	5	Main round
3	Congo	3	1	0	2	76	90	−14	2	
4	Japan	3	0	0	3	88	103	−15	0	

Source: IHF
Rules for classification: 1) points; 2) head-to-head points; 3) head-to-head goal difference; 4) head-to-head number of goals scored; 5) goal difference.

2 December 2007; 16:00	Spain	29–24	Congo	Le Parnasse, Nîmes; Attendance: 3,100
2 December 2007; 16:00		(13–12)		Le Parnasse, Nîmes; Attendance: 3,100
2 December 2007; 16:00		Report		Le Parnasse, Nîmes; Attendance: 3,100

2 December 2007; 18:00	Hungary	35–31	Japan	Le Parnasse, Nîmes; Attendance: 3,400
2 December 2007; 18:00		(19–16)		Le Parnasse, Nîmes; Attendance: 3,400
2 December 2007; 18:00		Report		Le Parnasse, Nîmes; Attendance: 3,400

3 December 2007; 18:30	Congo	20–33	Hungary	Le Parnasse, Nîmes; Attendance: 3,000
3 December 2007; 18:30		(9–18)		Le Parnasse, Nîmes; Attendance: 3,000
3 December 2007; 18:30		Report		Le Parnasse, Nîmes; Attendance: 3,000

3 December 2007; 20:30	Japan	29–36	Spain	Le Parnasse, Nîmes; Attendance: 3,000
3 December 2007; 20:30		(17–15)		Le Parnasse, Nîmes; Attendance: 3,000
3 December 2007; 20:30		Report		Le Parnasse, Nîmes; Attendance: 3,000

4 December 2007; 18:30	Japan	28–32	Congo	Le Parnasse, Nîmes; Attendance: 2,500
4 December 2007; 18:30		(13–15)		Le Parnasse, Nîmes; Attendance: 2,500
4 December 2007; 18:30		Report		Le Parnasse, Nîmes; Attendance: 2,500

4 December 2007; 20:30	Hungary	26–26	Spain	Le Parnasse, Nîmes; Attendance: 3,500
4 December 2007; 20:30		(13–14)		Le Parnasse, Nîmes; Attendance: 3,500
4 December 2007; 20:30		Report		Le Parnasse, Nîmes; Attendance: 3,500

=== Group F ===
Pos	Team	Pld	W	D	L	GF	GA	GD	Pts	Qualification
1	Germany	3	3	0	0	103	59	+44	6	Main round
2	South Korea	3	2	0	1	102	69	+33	4	Main round
3	Ukraine	3	1	0	2	89	69	+20	2	
4	Paraguay	3	0	0	3	41	138	−97	0	

Source: IHF
Rules for classification: 1) points; 2) head-to-head points; 3) head-to-head goal difference; 4) head-to-head number of goals scored; 5) goal difference.

2 December 2007; 16:00	Germany	26–21	Ukraine	Palais des Sports de Beaulieu, Nantes; Attendance: 4,500
2 December 2007; 16:00		(17–12)		Palais des Sports de Beaulieu, Nantes; Attendance: 4,500
2 December 2007; 16:00		Report		Palais des Sports de Beaulieu, Nantes; Attendance: 4,500

2 December 2007; 18:00	South Korea	50–12	Paraguay	Palais des Sports de Beaulieu, Nantes; Attendance: 4,500
2 December 2007; 18:00		(25–6)		Palais des Sports de Beaulieu, Nantes; Attendance: 4,500
2 December 2007; 18:00		Report		Palais des Sports de Beaulieu, Nantes; Attendance: 4,500

3 December 2007; 18:30	Paraguay	12–45	Germany	Palais des Sports de Beaulieu, Nantes; Attendance: 4,000
3 December 2007; 18:30		(6–25)		Palais des Sports de Beaulieu, Nantes; Attendance: 4,000
3 December 2007; 18:30		Report		Palais des Sports de Beaulieu, Nantes; Attendance: 4,000

3 December 2007; 20:30	Ukraine	25–26	South Korea	Palais des Sports de Beaulieu, Nantes; Attendance: 4,500
3 December 2007; 20:30		(13–15)		Palais des Sports de Beaulieu, Nantes; Attendance: 4,500
3 December 2007; 20:30		Report		Palais des Sports de Beaulieu, Nantes; Attendance: 4,500

4 December 2007; 18:00	Germany	32–26	South Korea	Palais des Sports de Beaulieu, Nantes; Attendance: 4,500
4 December 2007; 18:00		(14–12)		Palais des Sports de Beaulieu, Nantes; Attendance: 4,500
4 December 2007; 18:00		Report		Palais des Sports de Beaulieu, Nantes; Attendance: 4,500

4 December 2007; 20:00	Ukraine	43–17	Paraguay	Palais des Sports de Beaulieu, Nantes; Attendance: 4,500
4 December 2007; 20:00		(19–6)		Palais des Sports de Beaulieu, Nantes; Attendance: 4,500
4 December 2007; 20:00		Report		Palais des Sports de Beaulieu, Nantes; Attendance: 4,500

== President's Cup ==
=== Group I ===
Pos	Team	Pld	W	D	L	GF	GA	GD	Pts	Qualification
1	Brazil	2	2	0	0	74	38	+36	4	13th place game
2	Austria	2	1	0	1	44	58	−14	2	15th place game
3	Kazakhstan	2	0	0	2	39	61	−22	0	17th place game

Source: IHF
Rules for classification: 1) points; 2) head-to-head points; 3) head-to-head goal difference; 4) head-to-head number of goals scored; 5) goal difference.

6 December 2007; 18:30	Kazakhstan	19–36	Brazil	L'Elispace, Beauvais; Attendance: 2,200
6 December 2007; 18:30		(9–19)		L'Elispace, Beauvais; Attendance: 2,200
6 December 2007; 18:30		Report		L'Elispace, Beauvais; Attendance: 2,200

7 December 2007; 18:30	Kazakhstan	20–25	Austria	L'Elispace, Beauvais; Attendance: 2,300
7 December 2007; 18:30		(10–13)		L'Elispace, Beauvais; Attendance: 2,300
7 December 2007; 18:30		Report		L'Elispace, Beauvais; Attendance: 2,300

8 December 2007; 14:30	Brazil	38–19	Austria	L'Elispace, Beauvais; Attendance: 2,000
8 December 2007; 14:30		(19–10)		L'Elispace, Beauvais; Attendance: 2,000
8 December 2007; 14:30		Report		L'Elispace, Beauvais; Attendance: 2,000

=== Group II ===
Pos	Team	Pld	W	D	L	GF	GA	GD	Pts	Qualification
1	Ukraine	2	2	0	0	62	54	+8	4	13th place game
2	Tunisia	2	1	0	1	50	47	+3	2	15th place game
3	Congo	2	0	0	2	44	55	−11	0	17th place game

Source: IHF
Rules for classification: 1) points; 2) head-to-head points; 3) head-to-head goal difference; 4) head-to-head number of goals scored; 5) goal difference.

6 December 2007; 20:30	Tunisia	24–16	Congo	L'Elispace, Beauvais; Attendance: 2,300
6 December 2007; 20:30		(10–6)		L'Elispace, Beauvais; Attendance: 2,300
6 December 2007; 20:30		Report		L'Elispace, Beauvais; Attendance: 2,300

7 December 2007; 20:30	Tunisia	26–31	Ukraine	L'Elispace, Beauvais; Attendance: 2,500
7 December 2007; 20:30		(12–17)		L'Elispace, Beauvais; Attendance: 2,500
7 December 2007; 20:30		Report		L'Elispace, Beauvais; Attendance: 2,500

8 December 2007; 16:30	Congo	28–31	Ukraine	L'Elispace, Beauvais; Attendance: 2,000
8 December 2007; 16:30		(14–14)		L'Elispace, Beauvais; Attendance: 2,000
8 December 2007; 16:30		Report		L'Elispace, Beauvais; Attendance: 2,000

=== Group III ===
Pos	Team	Pld	W	D	L	GF	GA	GD	Pts	Qualification
1	Argentina	2	2	0	0	52	29	+23	4	19th place game
2	Dominican Republic	2	1	0	1	46	35	+11	2	21st place game
3	Australia	2	0	0	2	23	57	−34	0	23rd place game

Source: IHF
Rules for classification: 1) points; 2) head-to-head points; 3) head-to-head goal difference; 4) head-to-head number of goals scored; 5) goal difference.

6 December 2007; 18:30	Argentina	31–9	Australia	Palais des Sports Pierre de Coubertin, Plaisir; Attendance: 1,200
6 December 2007; 18:30		(15–8)		Palais des Sports Pierre de Coubertin, Plaisir; Attendance: 1,200
6 December 2007; 18:30		Report		Palais des Sports Pierre de Coubertin, Plaisir; Attendance: 1,200

7 December 2007; 18:30	Argentina	21–20	Dominican Republic	Palais des Sports Pierre de Coubertin, Plaisir; Attendance: 1,000
7 December 2007; 18:30		(11–13)		Palais des Sports Pierre de Coubertin, Plaisir; Attendance: 1,000
7 December 2007; 18:30		Report		Palais des Sports Pierre de Coubertin, Plaisir; Attendance: 1,000

8 December 2007; 14:30	Australia	14–26	Dominican Republic	Palais des Sports Pierre de Coubertin, Plaisir; Attendance: 1,000
8 December 2007; 14:30		(7–12)		Palais des Sports Pierre de Coubertin, Plaisir; Attendance: 1,000
8 December 2007; 14:30		Report		Palais des Sports Pierre de Coubertin, Plaisir; Attendance: 1,000

=== Group IV ===
Pos	Team	Pld	W	D	L	GF	GA	GD	Pts	Qualification
1	Japan	2	2	0	0	66	30	+36	4	19th place game
2	China	2	1	0	1	45	44	+1	2	21st place game
3	Paraguay	2	0	0	2	22	59	−37	0	23rd place game

Source: IHF
Rules for classification: 1) points; 2) head-to-head points; 3) head-to-head goal difference; 4) head-to-head number of goals scored; 5) goal difference.

6 December 2007; 20:30	China	22–30	Japan	Palais des Sports Pierre de Coubertin, Plaisir; Attendance: 1,200
6 December 2007; 20:30		(13–14)		Palais des Sports Pierre de Coubertin, Plaisir; Attendance: 1,200
6 December 2007; 20:30		Report		Palais des Sports Pierre de Coubertin, Plaisir; Attendance: 1,200

7 December 2007; 20:30	China	23–14	Paraguay	Palais des Sports Pierre de Coubertin, Plaisir; Attendance: 1,000
7 December 2007; 20:30		(13–6)		Palais des Sports Pierre de Coubertin, Plaisir; Attendance: 1,000
7 December 2007; 20:30		Report		Palais des Sports Pierre de Coubertin, Plaisir; Attendance: 1,000

8 December 2007; 16:30	Japan	36–8	Paraguay	Palais des Sports Pierre de Coubertin, Plaisir; Attendance: 1,000
8 December 2007; 16:30		(23–4)		Palais des Sports Pierre de Coubertin, Plaisir; Attendance: 1,000
8 December 2007; 16:30		Report		Palais des Sports Pierre de Coubertin, Plaisir; Attendance: 1,000

=== 23rd place game ===
9 December 2007; 12:00	Australia	14–16	Paraguay	Palais des Sports Pierre de Coubertin, Plaisir; Attendance: 1,200
9 December 2007; 12:00		(8–9)		Palais des Sports Pierre de Coubertin, Plaisir; Attendance: 1,200
9 December 2007; 12:00		Report		Palais des Sports Pierre de Coubertin, Plaisir; Attendance: 1,200

=== 21st place game ===
9 December 2007; 14:30	Dominican Republic	16–35	China	Palais des Sports Pierre de Coubertin, Plaisir; Attendance: 1,200
9 December 2007; 14:30		(11–17)		Palais des Sports Pierre de Coubertin, Plaisir; Attendance: 1,200
9 December 2007; 14:30		Report		Palais des Sports Pierre de Coubertin, Plaisir; Attendance: 1,200

=== 19th place game ===
9 December 2007; 17:00	Argentina	20–31	Japan	Palais des Sports Pierre de Coubertin, Plaisir; Attendance: 1,200
9 December 2007; 17:00		(10–19)		Palais des Sports Pierre de Coubertin, Plaisir; Attendance: 1,200
9 December 2007; 17:00		Report		Palais des Sports Pierre de Coubertin, Plaisir; Attendance: 1,200

=== 17th place game ===
9 December 2007
12:00
Kazakhstan
26–27 (ET)
Congo
L'Elispace, Beauvais
Attendance: 500

(11–10)

Report

FT: 21–21 ET: 5–6

=== 15th place game ===
9 December 2007; 14:30	Austria	23–30	Tunisia	L'Elispace, Beauvais; Attendance: 2,000
9 December 2007; 14:30		(10–15)		L'Elispace, Beauvais; Attendance: 2,000
9 December 2007; 14:30		Report		L'Elispace, Beauvais; Attendance: 2,000

=== 13th place game ===
9 December 2007; 17:00	Brazil	21–24	Ukraine	L'Elispace, Beauvais; Attendance: 2,400
9 December 2007; 17:00		(8–11)		L'Elispace, Beauvais; Attendance: 2,400
9 December 2007; 17:00		Report		L'Elispace, Beauvais; Attendance: 2,400

== Main round ==
=== Group M I ===
Pos	Team	Pld	W	D	L	GF	GA	GD	Pts	Qualification
1	Norway	5	4	0	1	147	124	+23	8 (Note: Norway 22–21 Russia)	Quarterfinals
2	Russia	5	4	0	1	149	116	+33	8	Quarterfinals
3	Angola	5	3	0	2	149	152	−3	6 (Note: France 27–29 Angola)	Quarterfinals
4	France (H)	5	3	0	2	130	133	−3	6	Quarterfinals
5	Croatia	5	0	1	4	137	156	−19	1 (Note: Macedonia 29–29 Croatia)	Ninth place game
6	Macedonia	5	0	1	4	121	152	−31	1	Eleventh place game

Source: IHF
Rules for classification: 1) points; 2) head-to-head points; 3) head-to-head goal difference; 4) head-to-head number of goals scored; 5) goal difference.
(H) Hosts
Notes:

6 December 2007; 15:00	Croatia	25–30	Russia	Arènes de Metz, Metz; Attendance: 4,500; Referees: Līcis, Stoļarovs (LAT)
6 December 2007; 15:00	Milanović-Litre, Pasičnik 4	(10–16)	five players 4	Arènes de Metz, Metz; Attendance: 4,500; Referees: Līcis, Stoļarovs (LAT)
6 December 2007; 15:00	4× (yellow card) 2× (suspension)	Report	3× (yellow card) 3× (suspension)	Arènes de Metz, Metz; Attendance: 4,500; Referees: Līcis, Stoļarovs (LAT)

6 December 2007; 19:00	France	27–29	Angola	Arènes de Metz, Metz; Attendance: 4,500
6 December 2007; 19:00		(16–11)		Arènes de Metz, Metz; Attendance: 4,500
6 December 2007; 19:00		Report		Arènes de Metz, Metz; Attendance: 4,500

6 December 2007; 21:20	Macedonia	22–34	Norway	Arènes de Metz, Metz; Attendance: 4,200
6 December 2007; 21:20		(9–16)		Arènes de Metz, Metz; Attendance: 4,200
6 December 2007; 21:20		Report		Arènes de Metz, Metz; Attendance: 4,200

8 December 2007; 15:00	Macedonia	23–29	France	Arènes de Metz, Metz; Attendance: 4,800
8 December 2007; 15:00		(11–12)		Arènes de Metz, Metz; Attendance: 4,800
8 December 2007; 15:00		Report		Arènes de Metz, Metz; Attendance: 4,800

8 December 2007; 17:00	Croatia	28–34	Angola	Arènes de Metz, Metz; Attendance: 4,000
8 December 2007; 17:00		(16–16)		Arènes de Metz, Metz; Attendance: 4,000
8 December 2007; 17:00		Report		Arènes de Metz, Metz; Attendance: 4,000

8 December 2007; 19:15	Norway	22–21	Russia	Arènes de Metz, Metz; Attendance: 4,100; Referees: Baum, Góralczyk (POL)
8 December 2007; 19:15	Lybekk, Nyberg 5	(7–9)	Polenova 5	Arènes de Metz, Metz; Attendance: 4,100; Referees: Baum, Góralczyk (POL)
8 December 2007; 19:15	3× (yellow card) 3× (suspension)	Report	3× (yellow card) 2× (suspension)	Arènes de Metz, Metz; Attendance: 4,100; Referees: Baum, Góralczyk (POL)

9 December 2007; 14:30	Macedonia	25–33	Angola	Arènes de Metz, Metz; Attendance: 3,800
9 December 2007; 14:30		(14–17)		Arènes de Metz, Metz; Attendance: 3,800
9 December 2007; 14:30		Report		Arènes de Metz, Metz; Attendance: 3,800

9 December 2007; 16:30	Norway	35–29	Croatia	Arènes de Metz, Metz; Attendance: 4,500
9 December 2007; 16:30		(15–14)		Arènes de Metz, Metz; Attendance: 4,500
9 December 2007; 16:30		Report		Arènes de Metz, Metz; Attendance: 4,500

9 December 2007; 19:00	Russia	31–20	France	Arènes de Metz, Metz; Attendance: 4,800; Referees: Din, Dinu (ROU)
9 December 2007; 19:00	Polenova 7	(15–9)	Ayglon 6	Arènes de Metz, Metz; Attendance: 4,800; Referees: Din, Dinu (ROU)
9 December 2007; 19:00	3× (yellow card) 5× (suspension)	Report	3× (yellow card) 4× (suspension)	Arènes de Metz, Metz; Attendance: 4,800; Referees: Din, Dinu (ROU)

11 December 2007; 16:30	Angola	27–40	Russia	Arènes de Metz, Metz; Attendance: 2,000; Referees: Līcis, Stoļarovs (LAT)
11 December 2007; 16:30	Bengue 6	(11–21)	Levina 8	Arènes de Metz, Metz; Attendance: 2,000; Referees: Līcis, Stoļarovs (LAT)
11 December 2007; 16:30	3× (yellow card) 2× (suspension)	Report	3× (yellow card) 1× (suspension)	Arènes de Metz, Metz; Attendance: 2,000; Referees: Līcis, Stoļarovs (LAT)

11 December 2007; 19:15	France	26–24	Norway	Arènes de Metz, Metz; Attendance: 4,800
11 December 2007; 19:15		(11–10)		Arènes de Metz, Metz; Attendance: 4,800
11 December 2007; 19:15		Report		Arènes de Metz, Metz; Attendance: 4,800

11 December 2007; 21:15	Macedonia	29–29	Croatia	Arènes de Metz, Metz; Attendance: 4,200
11 December 2007; 21:15		(13–15)		Arènes de Metz, Metz; Attendance: 4,200
11 December 2007; 21:15		Report		Arènes de Metz, Metz; Attendance: 4,200

=== Group M II ===
Pos	Team	Pld	W	D	L	GF	GA	GD	Pts	Qualification
1	Romania	5	4	0	1	164	137	+27	8	Quarterfinals
2	Germany	5	3	1	1	151	145	+6	7	Quarterfinals
3	Hungary	5	2	2	1	144	144	0	6	Quarterfinals
4	South Korea	5	2	0	3	147	150	−3	4	Quarterfinals
5	Spain	5	1	1	3	127	144	−17	3	Ninth place game
6	Poland	5	1	0	4	154	167	−13	2	Eleventh place game

Source: IHF
Rules for classification: 1) points; 2) head-to-head points; 3) head-to-head goal difference; 4) head-to-head number of goals scored; 5) goal difference.

6 December 2007; 14:30	Romania	31–27	South Korea	Palais des Sports de Dijon, Dijon; Attendance: 3,000
6 December 2007; 14:30		(14–15)		Palais des Sports de Dijon, Dijon; Attendance: 3,000
6 December 2007; 14:30		Report		Palais des Sports de Dijon, Dijon; Attendance: 3,000

6 December 2007; 18:30	Spain	25–30	Germany	Palais des Sports de Dijon, Dijon; Attendance: 2,500
6 December 2007; 18:30		(8–14)		Palais des Sports de Dijon, Dijon; Attendance: 2,500
6 December 2007; 18:30		Report		Palais des Sports de Dijon, Dijon; Attendance: 2,500

6 December 2007; 20:30	Poland	26–28	Hungary	Palais des Sports de Dijon, Dijon; Attendance: 2,500
6 December 2007; 20:30		(13–11)		Palais des Sports de Dijon, Dijon; Attendance: 2,500
6 December 2007; 20:30		Report		Palais des Sports de Dijon, Dijon; Attendance: 2,500

8 December 2007; 14:30	Germany	30–30	Hungary	Palais des Sports de Dijon, Dijon; Attendance: 2,700
8 December 2007; 14:30		(14–17)		Palais des Sports de Dijon, Dijon; Attendance: 2,700
8 December 2007; 14:30		Report		Palais des Sports de Dijon, Dijon; Attendance: 2,700

8 December 2007; 16:30	Poland	33–37	South Korea	Palais des Sports de Dijon, Dijon; Attendance: 2,800
8 December 2007; 16:30		(19–20)		Palais des Sports de Dijon, Dijon; Attendance: 2,800
8 December 2007; 16:30		Report		Palais des Sports de Dijon, Dijon; Attendance: 2,800

8 December 2007; 18:30	Spain	19–32	Romania	Palais des Sports de Dijon, Dijon; Attendance: 2,700
8 December 2007; 18:30		(6–19)		Palais des Sports de Dijon, Dijon; Attendance: 2,700
8 December 2007; 18:30		Report		Palais des Sports de Dijon, Dijon; Attendance: 2,700

9 December 2007; 14:30	Spain	28–26	South Korea	Palais des Sports de Dijon, Dijon; Attendance: 3,000
9 December 2007; 14:30		(13–12)		Palais des Sports de Dijon, Dijon; Attendance: 3,000
9 December 2007; 14:30		Report		Palais des Sports de Dijon, Dijon; Attendance: 3,000

9 December 2007; 16:30	Hungary	34–31	Romania	Palais des Sports de Dijon, Dijon; Attendance: 3,400
9 December 2007; 16:30		(14–16)		Palais des Sports de Dijon, Dijon; Attendance: 3,400
9 December 2007; 16:30		Report		Palais des Sports de Dijon, Dijon; Attendance: 3,400

9 December 2007; 18:30	Germany	35–32	Poland	Palais des Sports de Dijon, Dijon; Attendance: 2,800
9 December 2007; 18:30		(22–12)		Palais des Sports de Dijon, Dijon; Attendance: 2,800
9 December 2007; 18:30		Report		Palais des Sports de Dijon, Dijon; Attendance: 2,800

11 December 2007; 16:30	South Korea	31–26	Hungary	Palais des Sports de Dijon, Dijon; Attendance: 2,800
11 December 2007; 16:30		(12–9)		Palais des Sports de Dijon, Dijon; Attendance: 2,800
11 December 2007; 16:30		Report		Palais des Sports de Dijon, Dijon; Attendance: 2,800

11 December 2007; 18:30	Romania	32–24	Germany	Palais des Sports de Dijon, Dijon; Attendance: 2,800
11 December 2007; 18:30		(16–12)		Palais des Sports de Dijon, Dijon; Attendance: 2,800
11 December 2007; 18:30		Report		Palais des Sports de Dijon, Dijon; Attendance: 2,800

11 December 2007; 20:30	Spain	29–30	Poland	Palais des Sports de Dijon, Dijon; Attendance: 2,800
11 December 2007; 20:30		(14–15)		Palais des Sports de Dijon, Dijon; Attendance: 2,800
11 December 2007; 20:30		Report		Palais des Sports de Dijon, Dijon; Attendance: 2,800

== Knockout stage ==
=== Bracket ===
Championship bracket

Quarterfinals
13 December
Norway	35
South Korea	24
13 December
Angola	33
Germany	36
13 December
Romania (OT)	34
France	31
13 December
Hungary	35
Russia	36

Semifinals
15 December
Norway	33
Germany	30
15 December
Romania	20
Russia	30

Final
16 December
Norway	24
Russia	29
Third place
16 December
Germany (OT)	36
Romania	35

5th place bracket

5–8th place semifinals
15 December
South Korea	41
Angola	33
15 December
France	32
Hungary	27

Fifth place
16 December
South Korea	25
France	26
Seventh place
16 December
Angola	37
Hungary	36

=== Quarterfinals ===
13 December 2007; 13:00	Angola	33–36	Germany	Palais Omnisports de Paris-Bercy, Paris; Attendance: 9,000; Referees: Chernega, Poladenko (RUS)
13 December 2007; 13:00	Kiala 13	(14–18)	Jurack 11	Palais Omnisports de Paris-Bercy, Paris; Attendance: 9,000; Referees: Chernega, Poladenko (RUS)
13 December 2007; 13:00	3× (yellow card) 5× (suspension)	Report	2× (yellow card) 5× (suspension)	Palais Omnisports de Paris-Bercy, Paris; Attendance: 9,000; Referees: Chernega, Poladenko (RUS)

13 December 2007; 15:30	Hungary	35–36	Russia	Palais Omnisports de Paris-Bercy, Paris; Attendance: 9,000; Referees: Krstić, Ljubič (SLO)
13 December 2007; 15:30	Görbicz 9	(22–20)	Andryushina, Shipilova 7	Palais Omnisports de Paris-Bercy, Paris; Attendance: 9,000; Referees: Krstić, Ljubič (SLO)
13 December 2007; 15:30	3× (yellow card) 3× (suspension)	Report	4× (yellow card) 4× (suspension)	Palais Omnisports de Paris-Bercy, Paris; Attendance: 9,000; Referees: Krstić, Ljubič (SLO)

13 December 2007; 18:00	Norway	35–24	South Korea	Palais Omnisports de Paris-Bercy, Paris; Attendance: 11,500; Referees: Bord, Buy (FRA)
13 December 2007; 18:00	Hammerseng 10	(16–12)	Lee S. 6	Palais Omnisports de Paris-Bercy, Paris; Attendance: 11,500; Referees: Bord, Buy (FRA)
13 December 2007; 18:00	2× (yellow card) 3× (suspension)	Report	3× (yellow card) 5× (suspension)	Palais Omnisports de Paris-Bercy, Paris; Attendance: 11,500; Referees: Bord, Buy (FRA)

13 December 2007
20:30
Romania
34–31 (ET)
France
Palais Omnisports de Paris-Bercy, Paris
Attendance: 13,000
Referees: Līcis, Stoļarovs (LAT)
Maier 10
(8–14)
Borg, Herbrecht 6
4× (yellow card) 4× (suspension)
Report
3× (yellow card) 2× (suspension)

FT: 24–24 ET: 3–3, 7–4

=== 5–8th place semifinals ===
15 December 2007; 10:00	South Korea	41–33	Angola	Palais Omnisports de Paris-Bercy, Paris; Attendance: 3,000; Referees: Krstić, Ljubič (SLO)
15 December 2007; 10:00	Woo 11	(23–12)	Kiala 9	Palais Omnisports de Paris-Bercy, Paris; Attendance: 3,000; Referees: Krstić, Ljubič (SLO)
15 December 2007; 10:00	3× (yellow card) 8× (suspension) 2× (red card)	Report	3× (yellow card) 2× (suspension)	Palais Omnisports de Paris-Bercy, Paris; Attendance: 3,000; Referees: Krstić, Ljubič (SLO)

15 December 2007; 12:30	France	32–27	Hungary	Palais Omnisports de Paris-Bercy, Paris; Attendance: 11,500; Referees: Chernega, Poladenko (RUS)
15 December 2007; 12:30	Cano, Pecqueux-Rolland 5	(16–15)	Tóth 10	Palais Omnisports de Paris-Bercy, Paris; Attendance: 11,500; Referees: Chernega, Poladenko (RUS)
15 December 2007; 12:30	3× (yellow card) 3× (suspension)	Report	2× (yellow card) 2× (suspension)	Palais Omnisports de Paris-Bercy, Paris; Attendance: 11,500; Referees: Chernega, Poladenko (RUS)

=== Semifinals ===
15 December 2007; 15:00	Romania	20–30	Russia	Palais Omnisports de Paris-Bercy, Paris; Attendance: 13,000; Referees: Gjeding, Hansen (DEN)
15 December 2007; 15:00	Meiroșu 5	(8–17)	Postnova 9	Palais Omnisports de Paris-Bercy, Paris; Attendance: 13,000; Referees: Gjeding, Hansen (DEN)
15 December 2007; 15:00	4× (yellow card) 2× (suspension)	Report	3× (yellow card) 5× (suspension)	Palais Omnisports de Paris-Bercy, Paris; Attendance: 13,000; Referees: Gjeding, Hansen (DEN)

15 December 2007; 17:30	Norway	33–30	Germany	Palais Omnisports de Paris-Bercy, Paris; Attendance: 13,000; Referees: Baum, Góralczyk (POL)
15 December 2007; 17:30	Lybekk 8	(19–16)	Jurack 12	Palais Omnisports de Paris-Bercy, Paris; Attendance: 13,000; Referees: Baum, Góralczyk (POL)
15 December 2007; 17:30	3× (yellow card) 4× (suspension)	Report	3× (yellow card) 3× (suspension)	Palais Omnisports de Paris-Bercy, Paris; Attendance: 13,000; Referees: Baum, Góralczyk (POL)

=== Eleventh place game ===
14 December 2007; 18:15	Macedonia	31–33	Poland	Palais Omnisports de Paris-Bercy, Paris; Attendance: 6,000; Referees: Liu, Liu (CHN)
14 December 2007; 18:15	Todorovska 11	(17–14)	Malczewska 7	Palais Omnisports de Paris-Bercy, Paris; Attendance: 6,000; Referees: Liu, Liu (CHN)
14 December 2007; 18:15	4× (yellow card) 4× (suspension)	Report	3× (yellow card) 2× (suspension)	Palais Omnisports de Paris-Bercy, Paris; Attendance: 6,000; Referees: Liu, Liu (CHN)

=== Ninth place game ===
14 December 2007; 20:45	Croatia	30–25	Spain	Palais Omnisports de Paris-Bercy, Paris; Attendance: 8,000; Referees: Din, Dinu (ROU)
14 December 2007; 20:45	Pasičnik 6	(18–9)	Mangué 7	Palais Omnisports de Paris-Bercy, Paris; Attendance: 8,000; Referees: Din, Dinu (ROU)
14 December 2007; 20:45	2× (yellow card) 4× (suspension)	Report	4× (yellow card) 4× (suspension) 1× (red card)	Palais Omnisports de Paris-Bercy, Paris; Attendance: 8,000; Referees: Din, Dinu (ROU)

=== Seventh place game ===
16 December 2007; 09:00	Angola	37–36	Hungary	Palais Omnisports de Paris-Bercy, Paris; Attendance: 2,000; Referees: Din, Dinu (ROU)
16 December 2007; 09:00	Kiala 9	(17–20)	Görbicz 13	Palais Omnisports de Paris-Bercy, Paris; Attendance: 2,000; Referees: Din, Dinu (ROU)
16 December 2007; 09:00	2× (yellow card) 6× (suspension)	Report	3× (yellow card) 3× (suspension)	Palais Omnisports de Paris-Bercy, Paris; Attendance: 2,000; Referees: Din, Dinu (ROU)

=== Fifth place game ===
16 December 2007; 11:30	South Korea	25–26	France	Palais Omnisports de Paris-Bercy, Paris; Attendance: 13,000; Referees: Gjeding, Hansen (DEN)
16 December 2007; 11:30	Woo 7	(13–12)	four players 4	Palais Omnisports de Paris-Bercy, Paris; Attendance: 13,000; Referees: Gjeding, Hansen (DEN)
16 December 2007; 11:30	3× (yellow card) 3× (suspension)	Report	3× (yellow card) 1× (suspension)	Palais Omnisports de Paris-Bercy, Paris; Attendance: 13,000; Referees: Gjeding, Hansen (DEN)

=== Third place game ===
16 December 2007
14:00
Germany
36–35 (ET)
Romania
Palais Omnisports de Paris-Bercy, Paris
Attendance: 13,000
Referees: Līcis, Stoļarovs (LAT)
Jurack 12
(11–18)
Meiroșu 12
4× (yellow card) 4× (suspension)
Report
3× (yellow card) 4× (suspension) 1× (red card)

FT: 32–32 ET: 4–3

=== Final ===
16 December 2007; 16:30	Norway	24–29	Russia	Palais Omnisports de Paris-Bercy, Paris; Attendance: 14,000; Referees: Bord, Buy (FRA)
16 December 2007; 16:30	Hammerseng 5	(12–16)	Kareyeva, Polenova 6	Palais Omnisports de Paris-Bercy, Paris; Attendance: 14,000; Referees: Bord, Buy (FRA)
16 December 2007; 16:30	2× (yellow card) 2× (suspension)	Report	3× (yellow card) 7× (suspension)	Palais Omnisports de Paris-Bercy, Paris; Attendance: 14,000; Referees: Bord, Buy (FRA)

== Ranking and statistics ==
=== Final ranking ===
Rank	Team
Gold medal	Russia
Silver medal	Norway
Bronze medal	Germany
4	Romania
5	France
6	South Korea
7	Angola
8	Hungary
9	Croatia
10	Spain
11	Poland
12	Macedonia
13	Ukraine
14	Brazil
15	Tunisia
16	Austria
17	Congo
18	Kazakhstan
19	Japan
20	Argentina
21	China (Note: China directly qualified as the host of Olympics.)
22	Dominican Republic
23	Paraguay
24	Australia

Qualified for the 2008 Summer Olympics
Qualified for the 2008 Summer Olympics through other tournaments
Qualified for the Olympic Qualification Tournament

2007 Women's World Champions

Russia
Third Title

Team roster

Inna Suslina, Polina Vyakhireva, Irina Poltoratskaya, Oxana Romenskaya, Liudmila Postnova, Anna Kareeva, Ekaterina Andryushina, Yana Uskova, Yelena Polenova, Emilia Turey, Natalia Shipilova, Maria Sidorova, Olga Levina, Nadezhda Muravyeva, Elena Dmitrieva and Irina Bliznova.
Head coach: Evgeny Trefilov.

=== All-star team ===
- Goalkeeper: Valérie Nicolas (FRA)
- Left wing: Polina Vyakhireva (RUS)
- Left back: Gro Hammerseng (NOR)
- Pivot: Ionela Stanca-Gâlcă (ROM)
- Centre back: Anita Görbicz (HUN)
- Right back: Grit Jurack (GER)
- Right wing: Yana Uskova (RUS)

Chosen by team officials and IHF experts: IHF.info

=== Top Goalkeepers ===
Rank	Name	Team	%	Saves	Shots
1	Terese Pedersen	Norway	48%	45	93
2	Mariia Makarenko	Ukraine	43%	23	54
3	Inna Suslina	Russia	42%	99	237
4	Darly Zoqbi	Brazil	41%	36	88
5	Valentina Kogan	Argentina	40%	49	124
5	Amandine Leynaud	France	40%	33	82
5	Chana Franciela Masson	Brazil	40%	50	126
5	Clara Woltering	Germany	40%	74	187
9	Katrine Lunde Haraldsen	Norway	39%	98	251
9	Luminiţa Dinu	Romania	39%	105	272

Source: IHF

=== Top goalscorers ===
Rank	Name	Team	Goals	Shots	%
1	Grit Jurack	Germany	85	137	62%
2	Anita Görbicz	Hungary	80	136	59%
3	Marcelina Kiala	Angola	72	162	44%
4	Ramona Maier	Romania	60	94	64%
5	Sophie Herbrecht	France	59	119	50%
6	Nair Almeida	Angola	57	108	54%
6	Tímea Tóth	Hungary	57	112	51%
6	Woo Sun-hee	South Korea	57	87	66%
9	Ilda Bengue	Angola	56	93	60%
10	Marta Mangué	Spain	55	82	67%

Source: IHF

== Medalists ==
Gold	Silver	Bronze
Russia Inna Suslina; Polina Vyakhireva; Irina Poltoratskaya; Oxana Romenskaya; Liudmila Postnova; Anna Kareeva; Ekaterina Andryushina; Yana Uskova; Elena Polenova; Emilyia Turey; Natalia Shipilova; Maria Sidorova; Olga Levina; Nadezhda Muravyeva; Elena Dmitrieva; Irina Bliznova	Norway Kari Aalvik Grimsbø; Anette Hovind Johansen; Katja Nyberg; Ragnhild Aamodt; Gøril Snorroeggen; Else-Marthe Sørlie Lybekk; Tonje Nøstvold; Karoline Dyhre Breivang; Gro Hammerseng; Kari Mette Johansen; Terese Pedersen; Marit Malm Frafjord; Katrine Lunde Haraldsen; Linn Jørum Sulland; Linn Kristin Riegelhuth; Vigdis Hårsaker	Germany Sabine Englert; Nadine Härdter; Ulrike Stange; Grit Jurack; Ania Rösler; Nina Wörz; Anne Müller; Nora Reiche; Anna Loerper; Mandy Hering; Nadine Krause; Kathrin Blacha; Susann Müller; Clara Woltering; Maike Brückmann; Maren Baumbach; Stefanie Melbeck
