= Yana Uskova =

Russian handball player (born 1985)

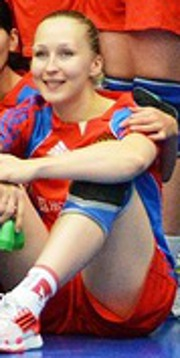
- Uskova in 2013

Personal information
- Full name: Yana Viktorovna Uskova
- Nationality: Russian
- Born: 28 September 1985 (age 41) Maykop, Russia
- Height: 1.74 m (5 ft 9 in)

Sport
- Sport: Handball
- Position: Right wing
- Current club: Kastamonu Handball

Senior clubs
- Years: Team
- -2016: AGU-Adyif
- 2006-2011: Rostov-Don
- 2011-2016: Zvezda Zvenigorod
- 2016-2017: HC Kuban Krasnodar
- 2017-2020: Kastamonu Handball
National team
Years	Team	Apps	(Gls)
–	Russia	96	(142)

Teams managed
- 2021-: AGU-Adyif (second team)
Medal record
Olympic Games
Silver medal – second place	2008 Beijing	Team
World Championship
Gold medal – first place	2007 France	Team

Yana Viktorovna Uskova (Russian: Яна Викторовна Ускова) (born 28 September 1985) is a former Russian handball player, playing on the Russian women's national handball team. She won the gold medal with the Russian team in the 2007 World Women's Handball Championship and was also voted into the championship's All-Star Team.

== Career ==
Uskova started her career at her hometown club AGU-Adyif. In 2006 she joined Rostov-Don.

In 2011 she joined Zvezda Zvenigorod. Here she won the 2014 Russian Cup and Super Cup. She also reached the final of the EHF Cup Winners' Cup, where they lost to Danish side Viborg HK.

In 2016 she joined HC Kuban Krasnodar. After a season she joined Turkish side Kastamonu Handball. Here she won the 2019 Turkish championship.

In 2020 she retired from handball.

In 2021 she became the coach of the AGU-Adyif second team.
