= Mandy Hering =

German handball player (born 1984)

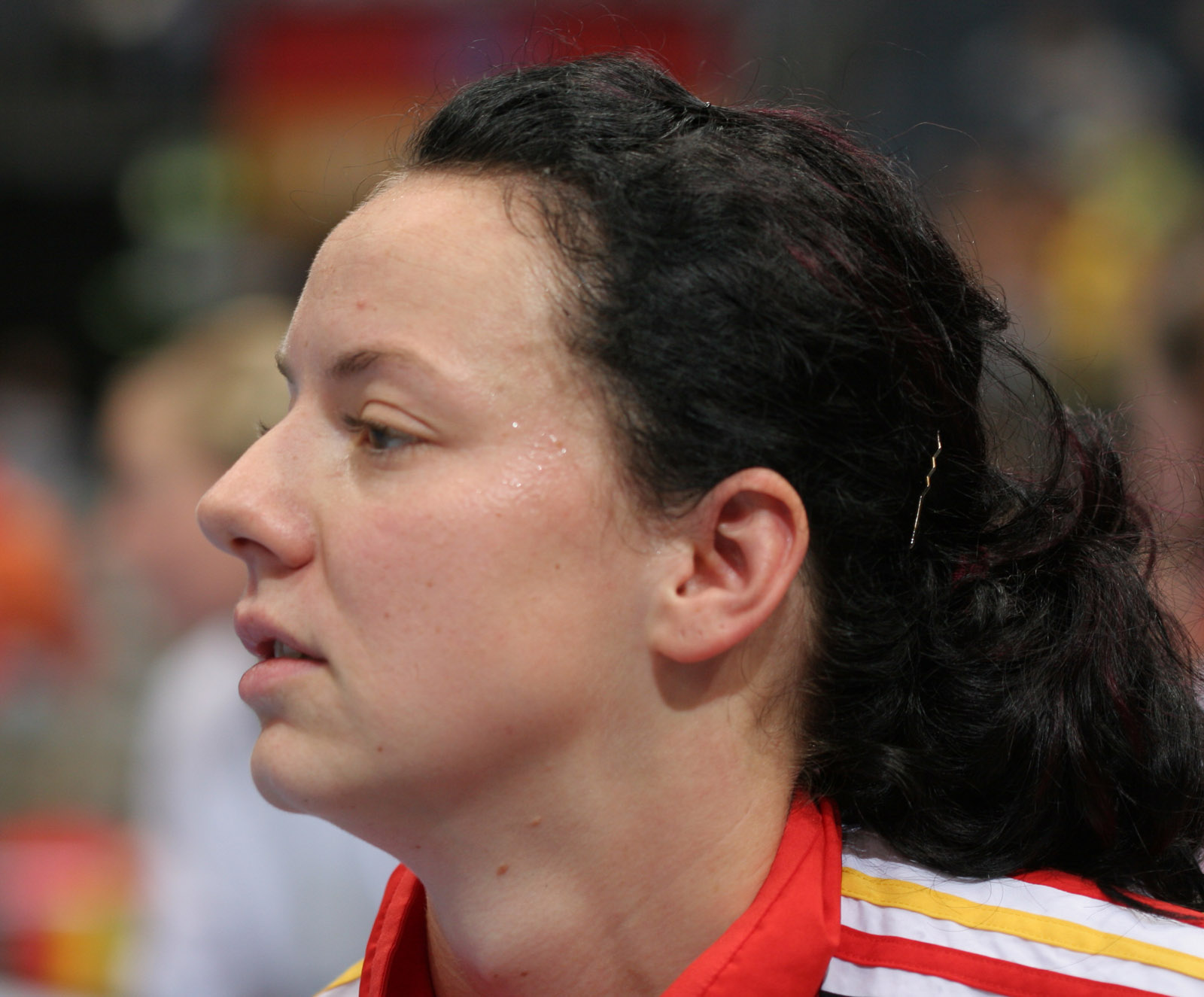
- Hering in 2008

Personal information
- Nationality: German
- Born: 11 March 1984 (age 42) Guben, East Germany
- Height: 1.70 m (5 ft 7 in)

Sport
- Sport: Handball
- Position: Left wing
- Current club: Retired

Youth career
- Years: Team
- 1993-1998: HV Guben
- 1998-2000: Frankfurter HC

Senior clubs
- Years: Team
- 2000-2012: Frankfurter HC
National team
Years	Team	Apps	(Gls)
2002-2012	Germany	85	(156)
Medal record
World Championship
Bronze medal – third place	2007 France	Team

Mandy Hering (born 11 March 1984) is a German retired handball player. She played her entire senior career for Frankfurter HC. She also played for the German national team.

At the 2007 World Women's Handball Championship she won a bronze medal with Germany. She also represented Germany at the 2008 Summer Olympic Games in Beijing, where the German team placed 11th. She participated at the 2009 World Women's Handball Championship in China.

== Career ==
Hering started playing handball aged 9 in her hometown club HV Guben. In 1998 she joined Frankfurter Handball Club, where she broke through on the first team in 2000, aged 16. In 2004 she won the German championship and in 2003 she won the DHB-Pokal. She retired after the 2011-2012 season.

She debuted for the German national team on November 9th 2002 against Romania.
