= Nadezhda Muravyova =

Russian handball player

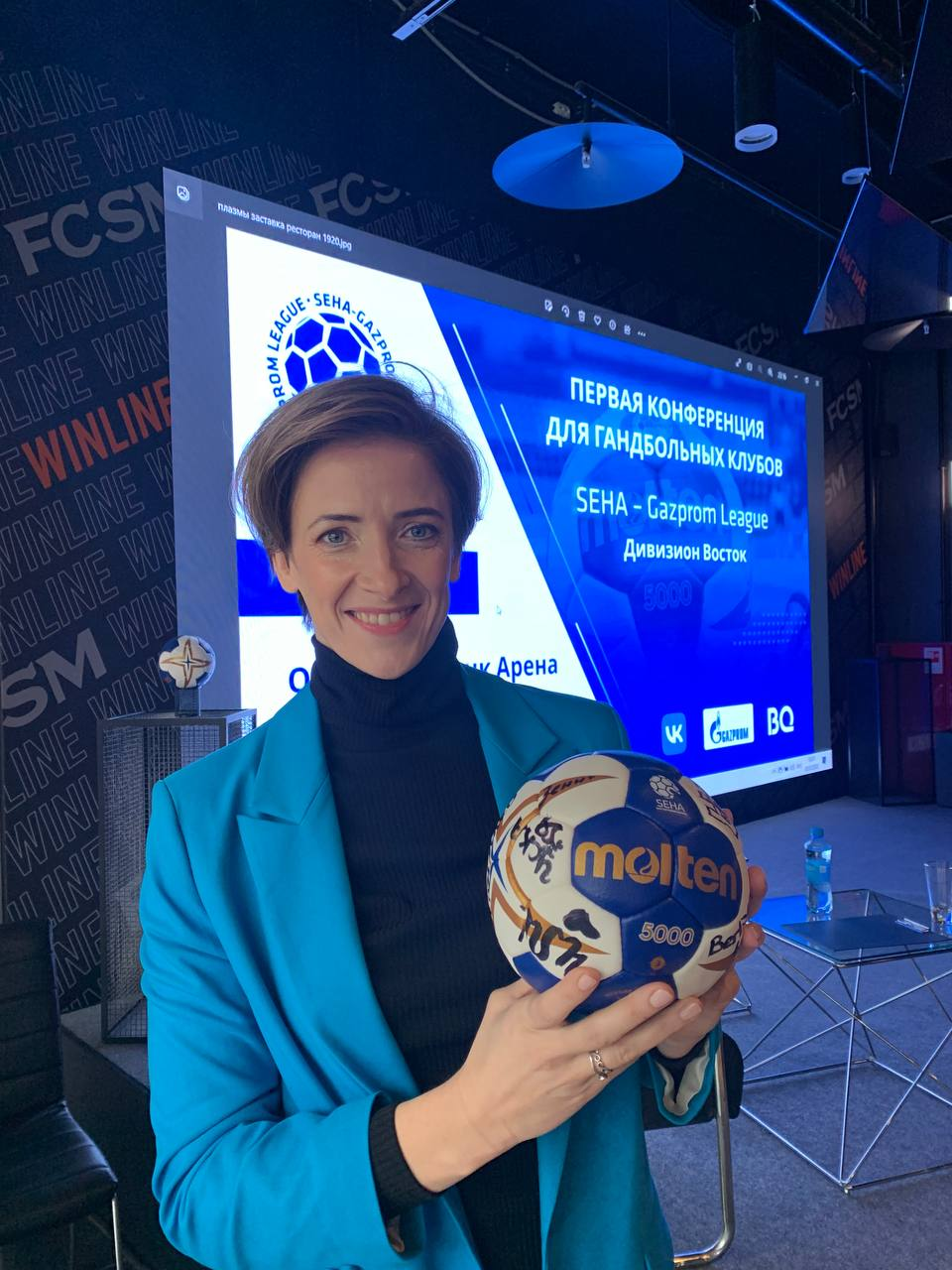

Personal information
- Full name: Nadezhda Konstantinovna Muravyova
- Nationality: Russian
- Born: 30 June 1980 (age 46) Bratsk, Russia
- Height: 1.86 m (6 ft 1 in)

Sport
- Sport: Handball
- Position: Right back

Senior clubs
- Years: Team
- 1996-2002: Aqva Volgograd
- 2002-2015: Lada Togliatti
National team
| Years | Team | Apps | (Gls) |
| – | Russia | 169 | (304) |

Teams managed
- 2024-: CSKA Moscow (assistant/head coach)
Medal record
World Championship
| Gold medal – first place | 2001 Italy | Team |
| Gold medal – first place | 2007 France | Team |
| Gold medal – first place | 2009 China | Team |
European Championship
| Bronze medal – third place | 2000 Romania | Team |
| Bronze medal – third place | 2008 Macedonia | Team |

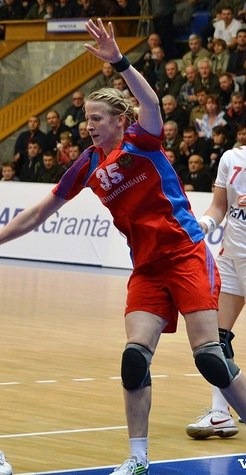
Muravyova during a match

Nadezhda Konstantinovna Muravyova (Russian: Надежда Константиновна Муравьёва is a Russian former team handball player and current coach. As a player she featured in the Russian women's national handball team. She was born on June 30, 1980, in Bratsk, Russia. She won gold medals with the Russian team in the 2007 and 2009 World Championships. At the 2008 European Women's Handball Championship in North Macedonia, she received a bronze medal, where she was also named "Best Defense Player".

She also participated at the 2011 World Women's Handball Championship in Brazil, where the Russian team won sixth place.

She was the assistant coach and head coach of CSKA Moscow.

== Life and career ==
Muravyova started her sports career as a gymnastic before moving to handball.

She began handball training at the age of 13 in Akwa Volgograd. Her first coach was Vladimir Fedorovic Civikov. With Volgograd she won the 1999, 2000 and 2001 Russian championship. She played for AKWA from 1996 to 2002, and since played with HC Lada Togliatti for the rest of her career. With HC Lada Togliatti she won the 2003, 2004 and 2005 Russian championship and the 2012 and 2014 EHF European League. In the 2005–06 season she took a break from handball due to pregnancy. She retired after the 2014–15 season.

For the 2024–25 season she became the assistant coach at CSKA Moscow.

== Awards and titles ==
- 1998 - bronze medalist, European Junior Handball Championship in Slovakia
- 1998 - bronze medalist, Russian league
- 1999 - winner of the Russian Championship with Akwa Volgograd
- 2000 - bronze medalist, European Handball Championship in Romania
- 2000 - winner of the Russian Championship with Akwa Volgograd
- 2001 - winner of the Russian Championship with Akwa Volgograd
- 2001 - winner of the World Women's Handball Championship
- 2003 - winner of the Russian Championship with HC Lada Togliatti
- 2004 - winner of the Russian Championship with HC Lada Togliatti
- 2005 - winner of the Russian Championship with HC Lada Togliatti
- 2007 - silver medalist with HC Lada Togliatti in the Russian Championship
- 2007- winner of the World Women's Handball Championship
- 2008 - bronze medalist, European Handball Championship in Fyr Macedonia
- 2009 - winner of the World Women's Handball Championship
