= Palais des Sports de Toulon =

Indoor sporting arena in Toulon, France

Coordinates: 43.125983°N 5.914271°E

Palais des sports de Toulon, also known as Palais des sports Jauréguiberry, is an indoor sporting arena located in Toulon, France. The capacity of the arena is 4,200 people. It is currently the home of the Hyères-Toulon Var Basket basketball team. It hosted the preliminary rounds of the 2007 World Women's Handball Championship. In 2019, it was the venue for a wheelchair rugby league match between France and England.
