= Irina Antonova (handballer) =

Kazakhstani-Russian handball player

Personal information
- Full name: Irina Antonova
- Nationality: Russian; Kazakhstani
- Born: 2 July 1986 (age 40) Moscow, Russian SFSR, Soviet Union
- Height: 1.80 m (5 ft 11 in)

Sport
- Sport: Handball
- Position: Pivot
- Current club: Zvezda Zvenigorod

Senior clubs
- Years: Team
- 2006–2013: Zvezda Zvenigorod
- 2016–2017: HC Kuban Krasnodar
- 2017–2019: HC Astrakhanochka
- 2019–2020: USC Dostyk
- 2020-: Zvezda Zvenigorod
National team
Years	Team	Apps	(Gls)
–	Kazakhstan	22	(134)

Irina Antonova (formerly Baranovskaya; born 2 February 1986) is a Kazakhstani-Russian handball player for Zvezda Zvenigorod and the Kazakhstani national team.

She participated at the 2011 World Women's Handball Championship in Brazil.
