= Agnieszka Jochymek =

Polish handball player (born 1985)

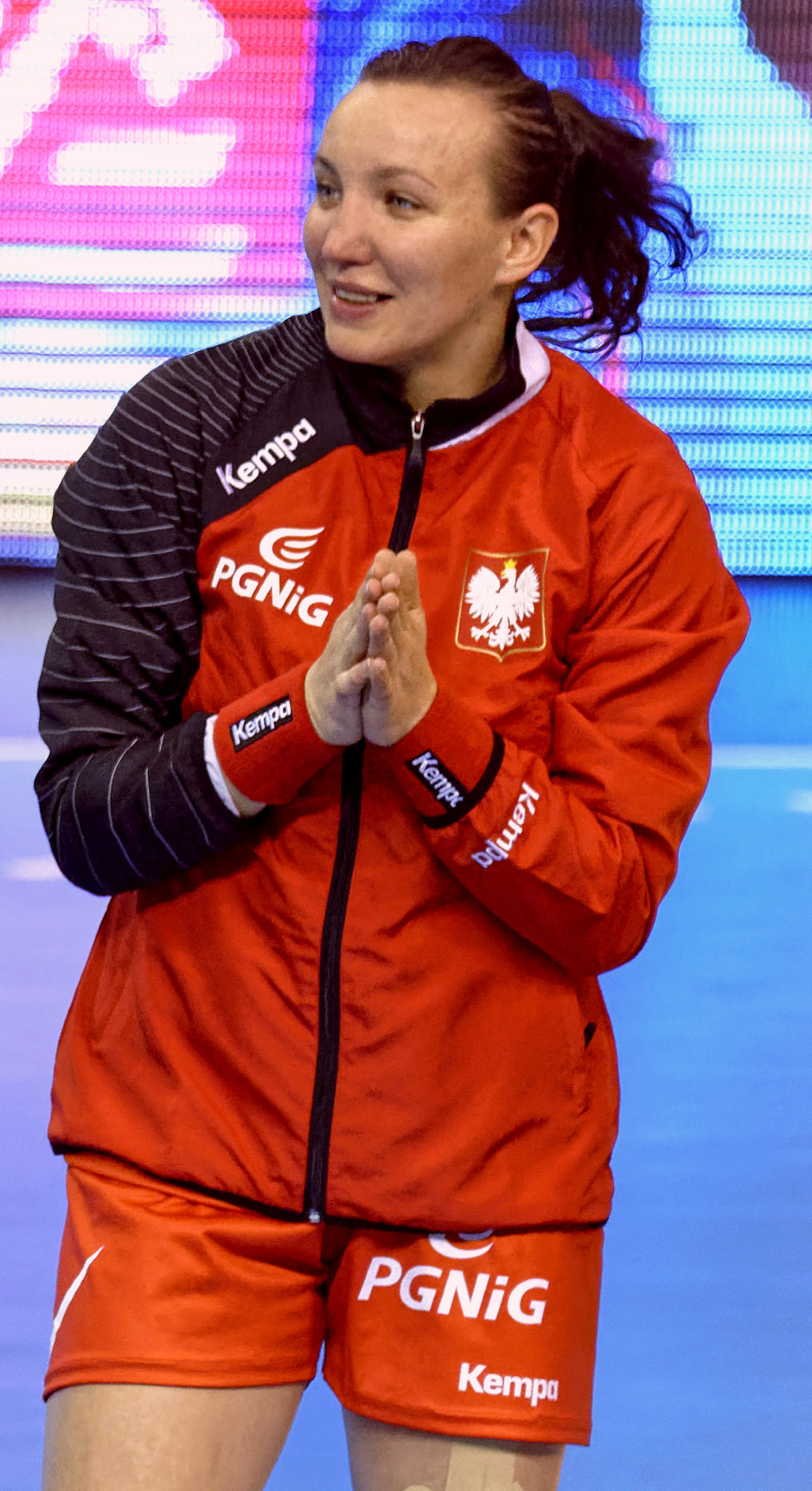

Personal information
- Nationality: Polish
- Born: 10 September 1985 (age 41) Krapkowice, Poland
- Height: 1.70 m (5 ft 7 in)

Sport
- Sport: Handball
- Position: Left wing
- Current club: Retired
- Number: 55

Senior clubs
- Years: Team
- –: MKS Zagłębie Lubin
National team
Years	Team	Apps	(Gls)
–	Poland	44	(61)

Agnieszka Jochymek (born 10 September 1985) is a Polish handball player.

== Career ==
Jochymek played for the club MKS Zagłębie Lubin. Playing for Polish national team, she represented Poland at the 2013 World Women's Handball Championship in Serbia.

== Personal life ==
Jochymek was born in Krapkowice on 10 September 1985.
