= Yelena Dmitriyeva =

Russian handball player (born 1983)

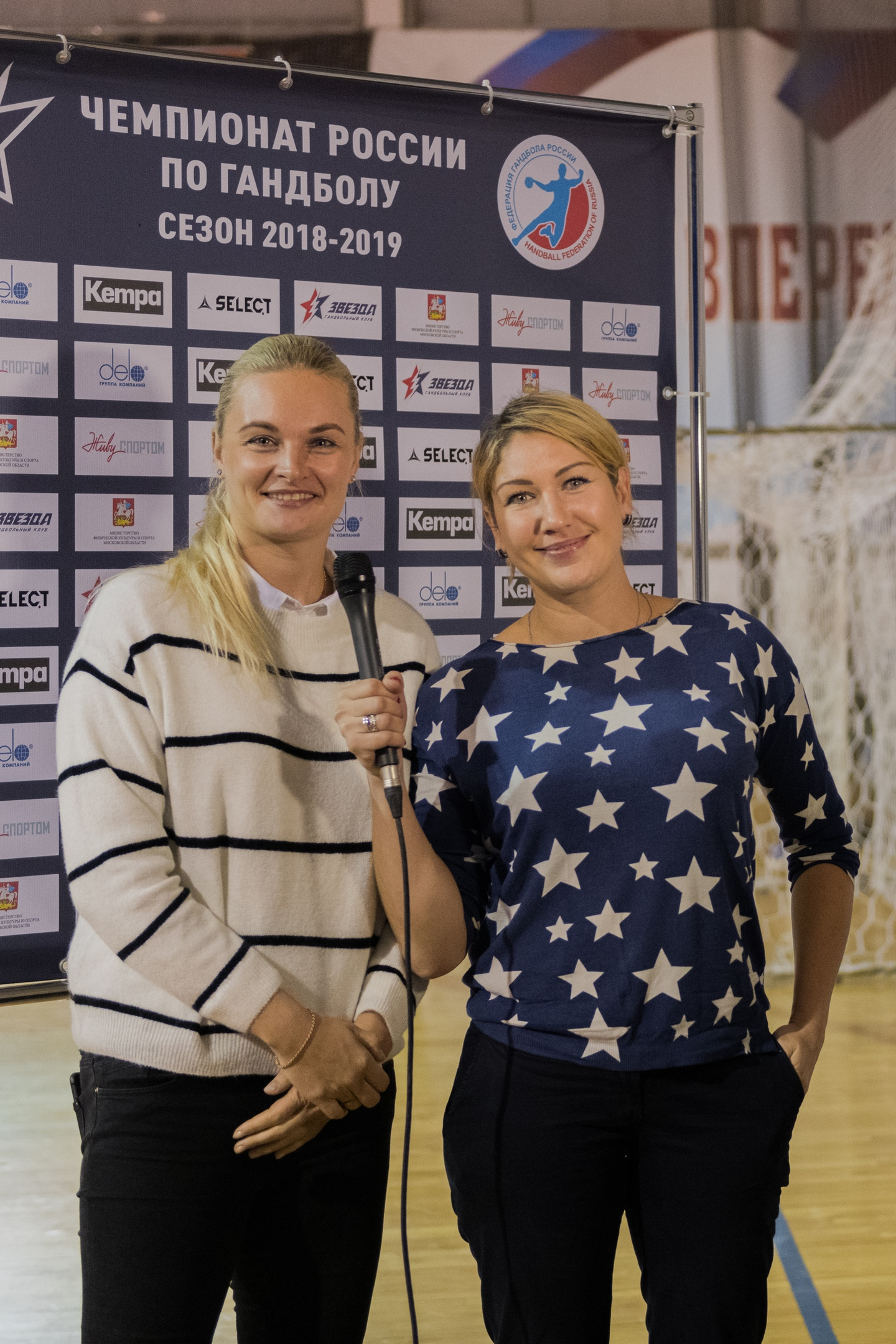
- Jelena Dmitrijewa (right) with Oksana Korolyova

Personal information
- Full name: Yelena Viktorovna Dmitriyeva
- Nationality: Russian
- Born: 1 July 1983 (age 43) Astrakhan, USSR
- Height: 1.75 m (5 ft 9 in)

Sport
- Sport: Handball
- Position: Left wing
- Current club: Retired

Youth career
- Years: Team
- –: (Russia) Astrakhan

Senior clubs
- Years: Team
- –2000: (Kazakhstan) Qysylorda
- 2000–2004: (Russia) Handball Club Lada
- 2004–2007: (Serbia and Montenegro) ŽRK Budućnost Podgorica
- 2007–2016: (Russia) Zvezda Zvenigorod
National team
- Years: Team
- 2001–2011: Russia
Medal record
Olympic Games
Silver medal – second place	2008 Beijing	Team
World Championship
Gold medal – first place	2007 France	Team
Gold medal – first place	2009 China	Team
European Championship
Bronze medal – third place	2008 Macedonia	Team

Yelena Viktorovna Dmitriyeva, née Chaplina (Russian: Елена Викторовна Дмитриева; born 1 July 1983 in Astrakhan) is a Russian team handball player, playing on the Russian women's national handball team. She won gold medals with the Russian winning teams in the 2007 and 2009 World Championships.

== Career ==
Dmitriyeva began playing handball aged 7. At the age of 15 she joined Kazahkstani team Qysylorda, where she won the Kazahkstani championship. In 2000 she joined Russian top league team Handball Club Lada, where she won the 2002, 2003 and 2004 Russian championships and the 2002 EHF Cup Winners' Cup.

In 2004 she joined ŽRK Budućnost Podgorica in Serbia-Montenegro, where she won the 2005 and 2006 championships and the 2006 EHF Cup Winners' Cup.

In March 2007 she returned to Russia to play the rest of the 2006-07 season at Zvezda Zvenigorod. In her first season she won Russian championship and the EHF European League. The season after she won the EHF Champions League with the club, beating Austrian Hypo NÖ in the final. In 2009 she won the Russian Cup. She retired in 2013.

=== National team ===
Dmitriyeva played for the Russian national team between 2001 and 2011. She won both the 2007 and 2009 World Championships with the team. At the 2008 Olympics she won a silver medal and at the 2008 European Championship she won a bronzemedal.
