= Terese Pedersen =

Norwegian handball player (born 1980)

Terese Hosking (Pedersen)
Personal information
- Nationality: Norwegian
- Born: 27 April 1980 (age 46) Sandefjord, Norway
- Height: 1.83 m (6 ft 0 in)

Sport
- Sport: Handball
- Position: Goalkeeper
- Current club: Retired

Senior clubs
- Years: Team
- –: Sandar IL
- 1999-2001: Larvik HK
- –: IL Runar
- -2006: Tertnes HE
- 2006-2009: Randers HK
- 2009-2011: Hypo Niederösterreich
- 2011-2014: Byåsen IL
National team
Years	Team	Apps	(Gls)
2004–2010	Norway	82	(0)
Medal record
European Championship
Gold medal – first place	2004 Hungary	Team
Gold medal – first place	2006 Sweden	Team
Gold medal – first place	2008 Macedonia	Team
World Championship
Silver medal – second place	2007 France	Team
Bronze medal – third place	2009 China	Team
- Updated on 14 May 2010

Terese Hosking (Pedersen) (born 27 April 1980 in Sandefjord) is a Norwegian handball goalkeeper. She recently played for Byåsen HE, but is now retired.

She started her club career in Larvik, and has also played for Runar, Sandar, Tertnes, and Randers HK.

She made her debut on the Norwegian national team in 2004, and played 82 matches with the team. She is a three-time European champion, in 2004, 2006 and 2008. She received a silver medal at the 2007 World Women's Handball Championship, and was ranked first on the championship's list of Top Goalkeepers with respect to % saves.
