= Mariya Sidorova =

Russian handball player

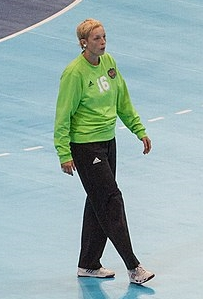
- Sidorova in 2012

Personal information
- Full name: Maria Igorevna Sidorova
- Nationality: Russian
- Born: 21 November 1979 (age 46) Balashikha, Russia
- Height: 1.78 m (5 ft 10 in)

Sport
- Sport: Handball
- Position: Goalkeeper
- Current club: Retired

Senior clubs
- Years: Team
- -2001: Veshnyaki
- 2001-2012: Handball Club Lada
- 2012-2015: Handball Club Lada
National team
Years	Team	Apps	(Gls)
–	Russia	182	(5)
Medal record
Olympic Games
Silver medal – second place	2008 Beijing	Team
World Championship
Gold medal – first place	2005 Russia	Team
Gold medal – first place	2007 France	Team
European Championship
Silver medal – second place	2006 Sweden	Team

Mariya Igorevna Sidorova (Russian: Мария Игоревна Сидорова; born 21 November 1979) is a Russian handball player, playing on the Russian women's national handball team. She won the gold medal with the Russian winning team in the 2007 World Championship.

She is currently the Team Leader of the Russia women's national team.

== Career ==
Sidorova started playing handball at the Moscow club Veshnyaki. In 2001 she joined Lada Togliatti She played for 11 years in Lada Togliatti, where she won the 2002, 2003, 2004, 2005, 2006 and 2008 Russian championships, before moving to Zvezda Zvenigorod in Summer 2012. Here she won the Russian cup in 2014. In 2015 she retired from handball.
