= Jessica Enström =

Swedish handball player (born 1977)

Personal information
- Full name: Jessica Margareta Enström
- Nationality: Swedish
- Born: 25 March 1977 (age 49) Enköping, Uppland, Sweden
- Height: 172 cm (68 in)

Sport
- Sport: Handball
- Position: Pivot

Youth career
- Years: Team
- 1983-1993: Fjärdhundra SK
- 1993-: Irsta HF

Senior clubs
- Years: Team
- -1997: Irsta HF
- 1997-2000: Stabæk Håndball
- 2000-2001: SG Hessen Hersfeld
- 2001-2009: IHV Västerås
- 2007: → Horsens HK (loan)
National team
Years	Team	Apps	(Gls)
1995-2008	Sweden	125	(325)

Teams managed
- 2014-2017: IHV Västerås assistant

Jessica Margareta Enström (born 25 March 1977) is a Swedish handball coach and former player. When she was an active player she played for the Swedish national team, where she competed at the 2008 Summer Olympics in China, where the Swedish team placed eight.

== Career ==
Enström started playing handball at Fjärdhundra SK before joining top league team in 1993. She played for Irsta HF until 1997, she moved to Norwegian club Stabæk Håndball to become professional. She played in Norway for three years, and them moved to German SG Hessen Hersfeld for a single season. She then returned to Sweden and her old club, which in the meantime had gotten a new name: IVH Västerås. Here she played for the rest of her career except for a one season loan in 2007 to Danish side Horsens HK. During her last stint in Sweden, she did receive offers from professional teams, but rejected them. She was the topscorer in the Swedish Elitserien in 2003-04 and in 2004-05.

== Post-playing career ==
After her playing career she has worked as a handball expert on Swedish TV including during the 2012 Olympics.

In 2014 she became the assistant coach at her former club IVH Västerås.
