= Inna Suslina =

Russian handball player (born 1979)

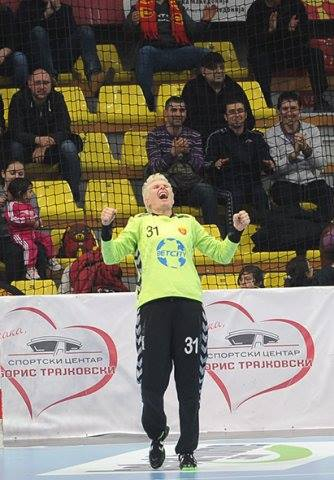

Personal information
- Full name: Inna Evgenevna Suslina
- Nationality: Russian
- Born: 5 January 1979 (age 47) Tashkent, Uzbekistan
- Height: 1.84 m (6 ft 0 in)

Sport
- Sport: Handball
- Position: Goalkeeper

Senior clubs
- Years: Team
- 1997-1998: Rostselmash
- 1998-1999: HC Kuban Krasnodar
- 1999-2001: AGU Adyif Maykop
- 2001-2004: Lada Togliatti
- 2004-2008: GOG Svendborg TGI
- 2008-2010: Zvezda Zvenigorod
- 2010-2012: Rostov-Don
- 2012-2018: HC Vardar
National team
Years	Team	Apps	(Gls)
2001–2012	Russia	172	(0)
Medal record
Olympic Games
Silver medal – second place	2008 Beijing	Team
World Championship
Gold medal – first place	2001 Italy
Gold medal – first place	2007 France
Gold medal – first place	2009 China
European Championship
Silver medal – second place	2006 Sweden
Bronze medal – third place	2000 Romania
Bronze medal – third place	2008 Macedonia

Inna Evgenevna Suslina (Russian: Инна Евгеньевна Суслина) (born 5 January 1979) is a Russian team handball player, who last played for HC Vardar and Russia women's national handball team. She was on the successful gold medal Team Russia in the 2007 World Women's Handball Championship.

She received a silver medal at the 2008 Summer Olympics in Beijing.

== Career ==
Suslina began her career at Rostselmash in 1997. A year later she joined HC Kuban Krasnodar. In 2001 she joined Lada Togliatti, where she won the 2002 Russian cup and 2002, 2003 and 2004 Russian championship.

In 2005 she joined Danish side GOG Svendborg TGI together with her national colleague Anna Kareyeva. Here she won the 2005 Danish Cup. In 2008 she returned to Russia and joined Zvezda Zvenigorod, where she won the EHF Champions League in the first season, beating Austrian Hypo NÖ in the final. After 2 years she returned to Rostov-Don.

For the 2012-13 season she joined Macedonian ŽRK Vardar SCBT. Here she won the Macedonian Championship 6 times in a row from 2013 to 2018 and the Cup 5 times in a row from 2014 to 2018. After the 2017-18 season she retired from handball.
