= Anne Müller =

German handball player (born 1983)

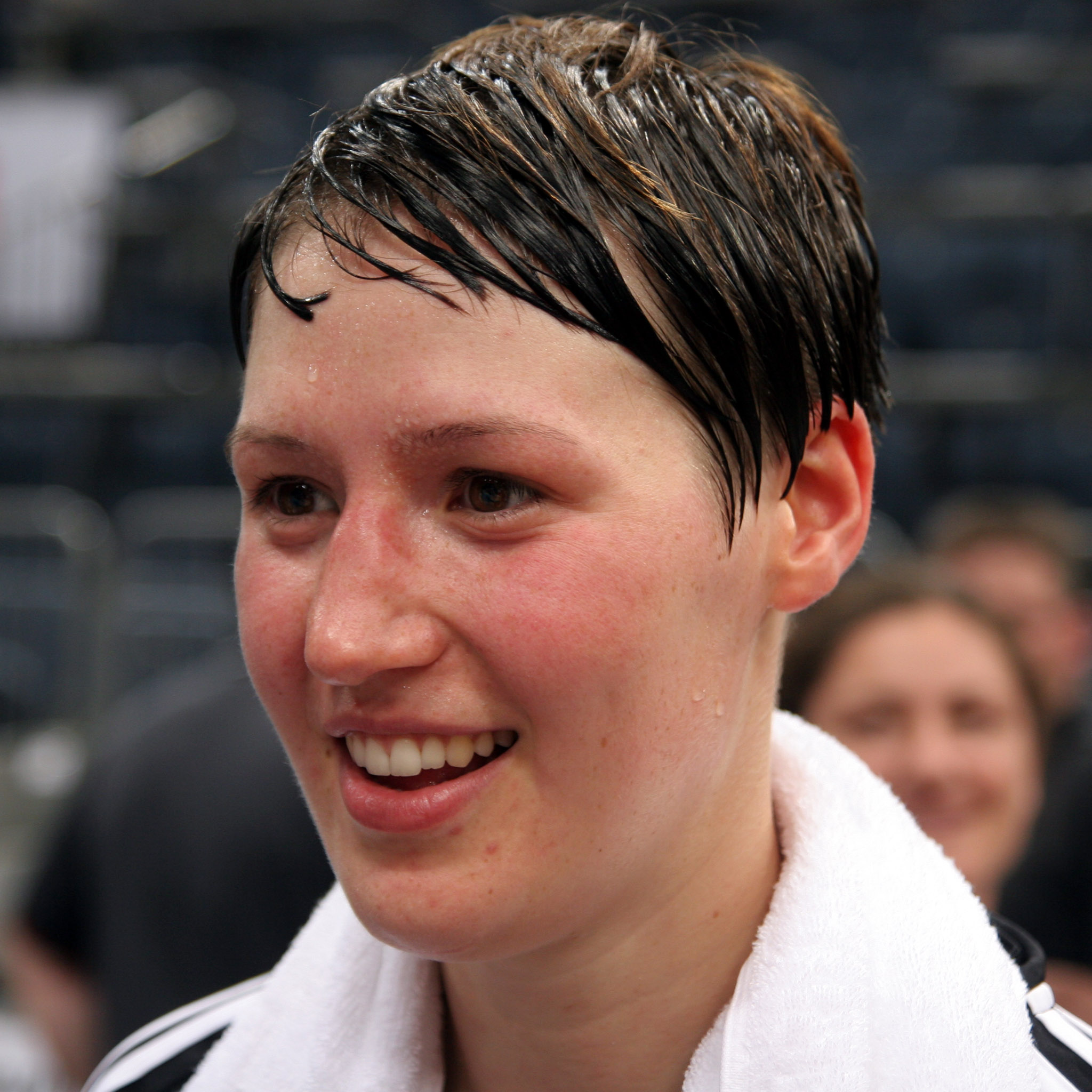

Personal information
- Nationality: German
- Born: 5 July 1983 (age 43) Wattenscheid, West Germany
- Height: 1.74 m (5 ft 9 in)

Sport
- Sport: Handball
- Position: Pivot

Senior clubs
- Years: Team
- 2002–2010: Bayer 04 Leverkusen
- 2010–2015: HC Leipzig
- 2015–2019: Borussia Dortmund
National team
Years	Team	Apps	(Gls)
2005–2017	Germany	167	(222)
Medal record
World Championship
Bronze medal – third place	2007 France	Team

Anne Müller (born 5 July 1983) is a Retired German handball player, who last played for Borussia Dortmund Handball, until 2019.

She won a bronze medal with the German national team at the 2007 World Women's Handball Championship.

She participated at the 2008 Summer Olympics in China, where the German team placed 11th.
