= Christine Vanparys-Torres =

French handball player (born 1978)

Personal information
- Nationality: French
- Born: 22 March 1978 (age 48) Toulon
- Height: 178 cm (70 in)

Sport
- Sport: Handball
- Position: Back
- Current club: Retired

Senior clubs
- Years: Team
- 1998-1999: Bouillargues Handball Nîmes Méditerranée
- 1999-2003: Toulon Métropole Var Handball
- 2003-2004: ASUL Vaulx-en-Velin
- 2004-2006: Metz Handball
- 2006-2007: HBC Nîmes
- 2007-2008: Metz Handball
- 2008-2012: Le Havre AC Handball
National team
Years	Team	Apps	(Gls)
2002-2009	France	96	(193)
Medal record
European Championship
Bronze medal – third place	2002 Denmark	Team
Bronze medal – third place	2006 Sweden	Team

Christine Vanparys-Torres (born 1978) is a French former handball player, who has played for the French national team. She participated at the 2008 Summer Olympics in China, where the French team placed fifth.
