= Clara Woltering =

German handball player (born 1983)

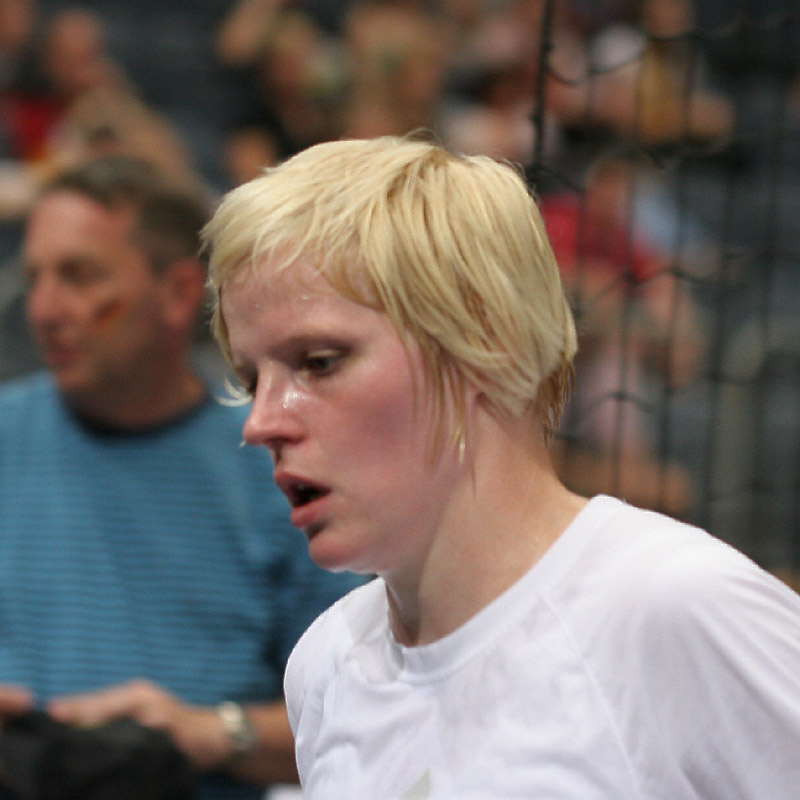

Personal information
- Nationality: German
- Born: February 3, 1983 (age 43) Münster, West Germany
- Height: 1.78 m (5 ft 10 in)

Sport
- Sport: Handball
- Position: Goalkeeper
- Current club: Retired
- Number: 16

Senior clubs
- Years: Team
- –1999: DJK Coesfeld
- 1999–2011: Bayer Leverkusen
- 2003–2004: → Borussia Dortmund (loan)
- 2011–2015: Budućnost Podgorica
- 2015–2019: Borussia Dortmund
National team
Years	Team	Apps	(Gls)
2003–2017	Germany	222	(1)
Medal record
World Championship
Bronze medal – third place	2007 France

Clara Woltering (born 2 March 1983) is a retired German handball goalkeeper, who played on the German women's national handball team.

== International career ==
Woltering made her debut on the German team in 2003, finished fifth within the 2004 European Championship, and sixth in the 2005 World Championship. At the 2006 European Championship she finished fourth, and received a bronze medal at the 2007 World Championship.

She competed at the 2008 Summer Olympics in Beijing, where Germany finished eleventh.

== Club career ==
Woltering was German Cupwinner with Bayer Leverkusen in 2002, and finalist in 2005. In 2005, she won the Challenge Cup with Bayer Leverkusen. In 2012 and 2015 she won the Champions League with ŽRK Budućnost.

== Achievements ==
- Champions League:
  - Winner: 2012, 2015
- German Cup:
  - Winner: 2002, 2010
- Montenegrin Championship:
  - Winner: 2012, 2013, 2014, 2015
- Montenegrin Cup:
  - Winner: 2012, 2013, 2014, 2015
- Women's Regional Handball League:
  - Winner: 2012, 2013, 2014, 2015
- EHF Challenge Cup:
  - Winner: 2005
- World Championship:
  - Bronze Medalist: 2007

== Awards ==
- German Handballer of the Year: 2009, 2010, 2017
- MVP of the EHF Champions League Final Four 2015
