= Nadine Härdter =

German handball player (born 1981)

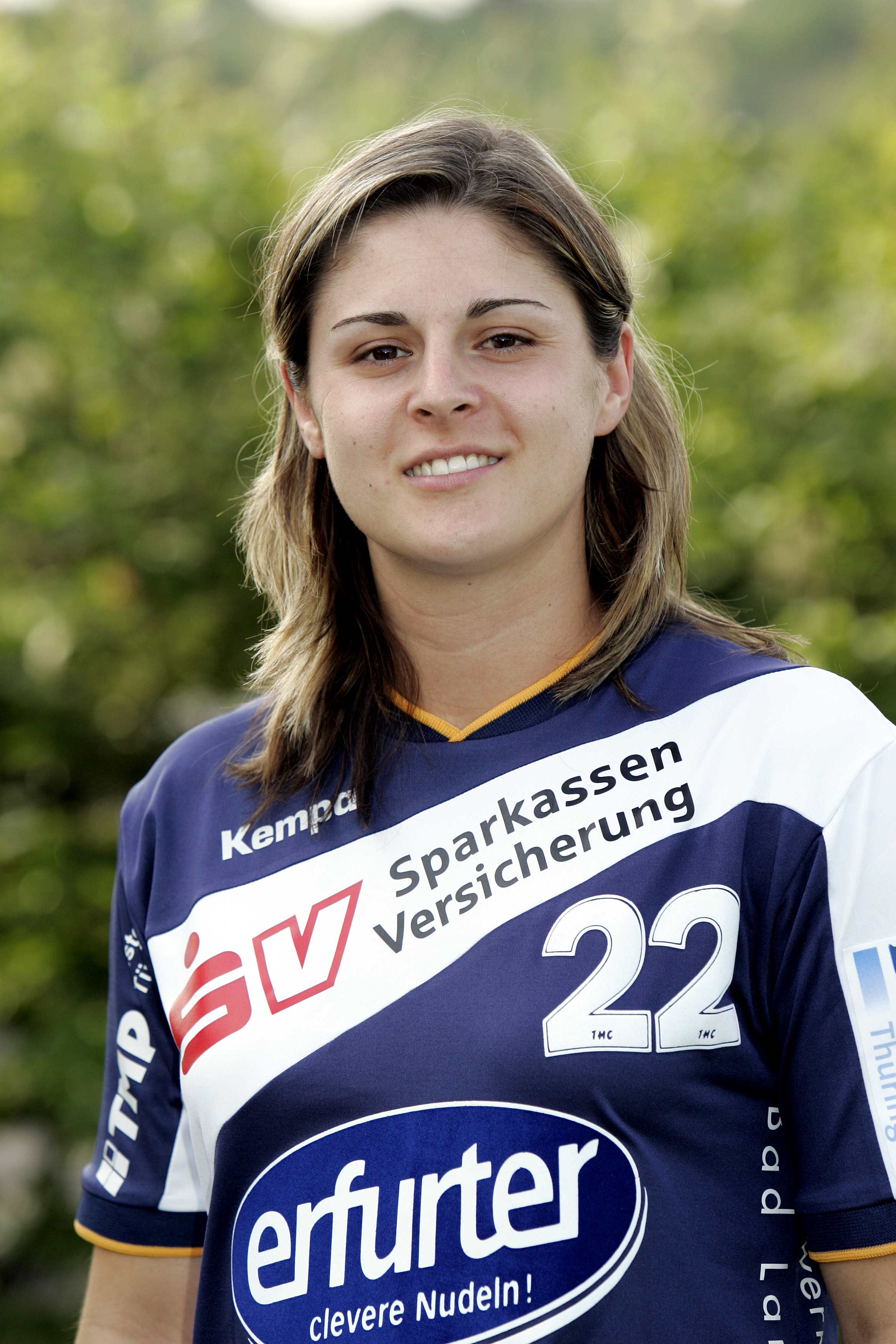

Personal information
- Nationality: German
- Born: 29 March 1981 (age 45) Kandel, Germany
- Height: 166 cm (65 in)

Sport
- Sport: Handball
- Position: Left wing
- Current club: Retired

Youth career
- Years: Team
- 1987-1997: TSV Kandel

Senior clubs
- Years: Team
- 1997-2000: TSG Ketsch
- 2000-2006: Borussia Dortmund Handball
- 2006-2010: Thüringer HC
- 2010-2011: VfL Sindelfingen
National team
Years	Team	Apps	(Gls)
1999-2009	Germany	161	(255)
Medal record
World Championship
Bronze medal – third place	2007 France	Team

Nadine Härdter (born 29 March 1981) is a German former handball player. She played for the German national team.

At the 2007 World Women's Handball Championship she won a bronze medal with Germany. She represented Germany at the 2008 Summer Olympic Games in Beijing, where the German team finished 11th. She participated at the 2009 World Women's Handball Championship in China.

== Career ==
Härdter started playing handball at her hometown club TSV Kandel. In 1997 she joined TSG Ketscb, where she played for three years. She then joined Borussia Dortmund Handball. In 2003 she won the EHF Challenge Cup with the team. In 2006 she joined Thuringer HC. After four seasons she joined VfL Sindelfingen. In 2011 Sindelfingen withdrew their team from the Bundesliga, and Härdter was unable to find a new team. Almost a year later she announced her retirement.
