= Yekaterina Andryushina =

Russian handball player

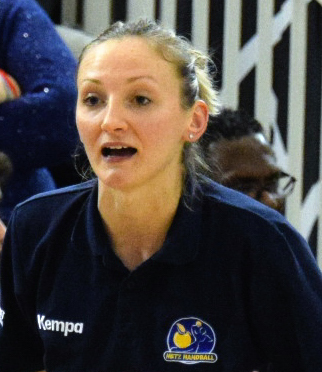
- Andryushina in 2016

Personal information
- Full name: Yekaterina Sergeyevna Andryushina
- Nationality: Russian
- Born: 17 August 1985 (age 41) Moskou
- Height: 1.85 m (6 ft 1 in)

Sport
- Sport: Handball
- Position: Central back
- Current club: Retired

Senior clubs
- Years: Team
- -2006: KSK Luch Moscow
- 2006-2011: Zvezda Zvenigorod
- 2011-2015: Metz Handball
National team
Years	Team	Apps	(Gls)
–	Russia	92	(205)

Teams managed
- 2014-: Metz Handball (assistent)
- 2019-2021: Netherlands women (assistent)
Medal record
Olympic Games
Silver medal – second place	2008 Beijing	Team
World Championship
Gold medal – first place	2007 France	Team
Gold medal – first place	2009 China	Team
Gold medal – first place	2019 Japan	Assistant Coach
European Championship
Silver medal – second place	2006 Sweden	Team
- Updated on 4 December 2012

Yekaterina Sergeyevna Andryushina (Russian: Екатерина Серге́евна Андрюшина, born 17 August 1985) is a former Russian team handball player, who played on the Russian women's national handball team. She won two gold medals with the Russian winning team at the 2007 and 2009 World Women's Handball Championship and again as assistant coach of The Netherlands Women's team in 2019.

== Career ==
Andryushina started her career at KSK Luch Moscow. In 2006 she joined Zvezda Zvenigorod. Here she won the 2007 Russian championship and EHF European League and the 2008 EHF Champions League.

In 2011 she joined French top team Metz Handball. Here she won the 2013 and 2014 French championship, 2013 and 2015 French cup and the 2013 and 2015 French League cup. In 2015 she retired from handball.

== Coaching career ==
From 2014 after her retirement she became the assistant coach at Metz Handball. From February 2019 to 2021 she was the assistant coach on the Dutch women's national team. In this position she won the 2019 World Championship, which was the first time The Netherlands had won this title.
