= Anna Kareyeva =

Russian handball player (born 1977)

Personal information
- Full name: Anna Vasilyevna Kareyeva
- Nationality: Russian
- Born: 10 May 1977 (age 49) Maykop, Russia
- Height: 185 cm (73 in)

Sport
- Sport: Handball
- Position: Left back

Senior clubs
- Years: Team
- -1998: AGU-Adyif
- 1998-1999: GK A-Elista Krasnodar
- 1999-2001: GU-Adyif
- 2001-2004: HC Lada Togliatti
- 2004-2006: GOG
- 2006-2008: Zvezda Zvenigorod
National team
- Years: Team
- 1998-2008: Russia
Medal record
Women's handball
Olympic Games
| Silver medal – second place | 2008 Beijing | Team |
World Championship
| Gold medal – first place | 2001 Italy | Team |
| Gold medal – first place | 2005 Russia | Team |
| Gold medal – first place | 2007 France | Team |
European Championship
| Silver medal – second place | 2006 Sweden | Team |
| Bronze medal – third place | 2000 Romania | Team |

Anna Vasilyevna Kareyeva (Russian: Анна Васильевна Кареева; born 10 May 1977) is a Russian handball player who competed internationally with the Russian national team. She has won the World Championship three times (2001, 2005 and 2007) and she also received a silver medal in the 2008 Summer Olympics.

== Career ==
Kareyeva started her career at her hometown club AGU-Adyif. For the 1998-99 she joined GK A-Elista Krasnodar for a season before returning to AGU-Adyif. In November 2001 she joined HC Lada Togliatti. Here she won the 2002, 2003 and 2004 Russian championship and the 2002 EHF Cup Winners' Cup.

In 2004 she joined Danish team GOG together with her national team colleague Inna Suslina. Here she won the 2005 Danish Cup. In the final she scored the most goals for her team with 6.

Between 2006 and 2008 she returned to Russia and played for Zvezda Zvenigorod. Here she won the 2007 Russian championship and EHF European League and the 2008 EHF Champions League.

She retired in 2008 following a knee injury, she had gotten during the 2008 Olympics.

=== National team ===
Kareyeva played for the Russian youth national team, where she won a bronze medal at the 1996 U-19 European Championship and a silver medal at the 1997 U20 World Championship. She debuted for the Russian national team in 1998.

At the 2000 European Championship she won bronze medals with the Russian team. A year later she won the 2001 World Championship. She scored 32 goals during the tournament. At the 2005 and 2007 World Championships she also won gold medals, and she also won a silver medal at the 2006 European Championship.

At the 2008 Olympics she had a knee injury during a match versus Brazil in the preliminary round, and this was the last match of her career.
