= Gro Hammerseng-Edin =

Norwegian handball player (born 1980)

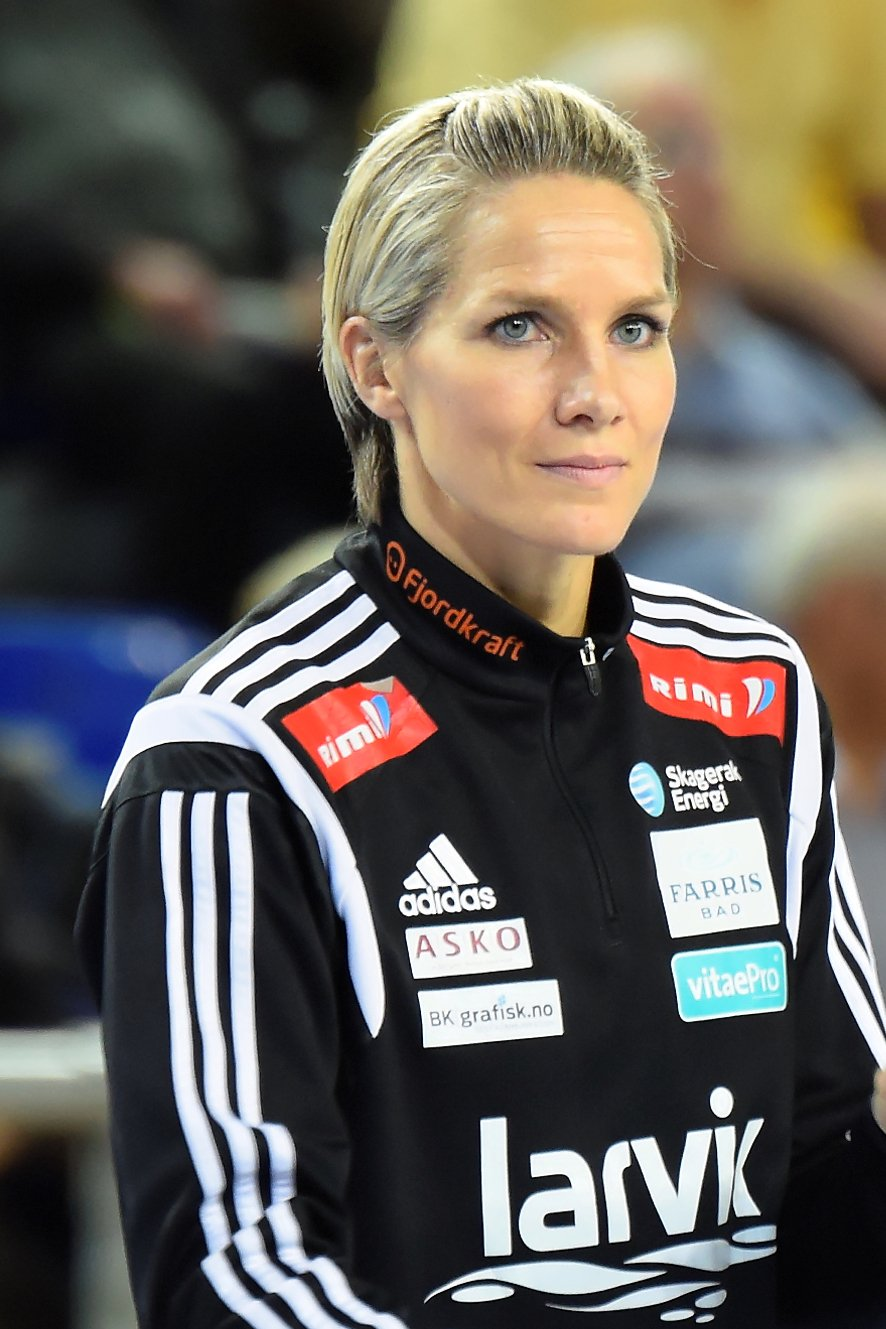

1st Chairperson of IHF Athletes' Commission
- Incumbent
- Assumed office 11 August 2016
- President: Hassan Moustafa (Egypt)
- Vice President: Miguel Roca Mas (Spain); Joël Delplanque (France)
- Preceded by: Position established

Gro Hammerseng-Edin
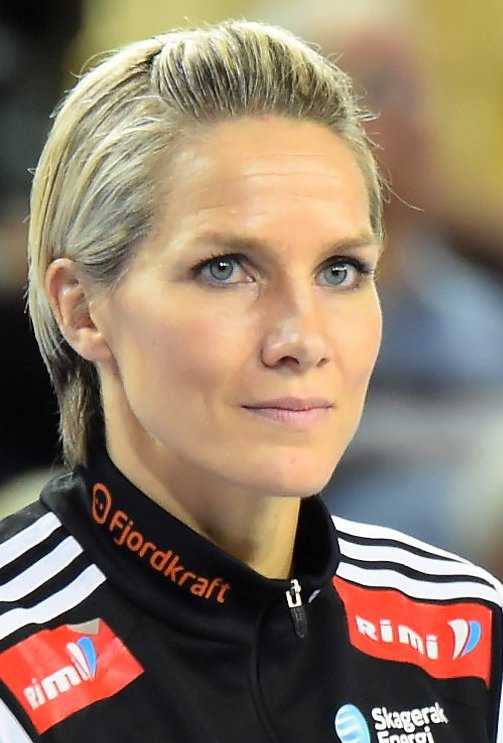

Personal information
- Nationality: Norwegian
- Born: 10 April 1980 (age 46) Gjøvik, Norway
- Height: 1.80 m (5 ft 11 in)

Sport
- Sport: Handball
- Position: Center back

Youth career
- Years: Team
- 1990–1995: Gjøvik HK
- 1995–1996: Raufoss IL
- 1996–1997: Vardal IF

Senior clubs
- Years: Team
- 1997–2003: Gjøvik og Vardal HK
- 2003–2010: FC Midtjylland Håndbold
- 2010–2017: Larvik HK
National team
| Years | Team | Apps | (Gls) |
| 2000–2010 | Norway | 167 | (631) |
Medal record
Women's handball
Representing Norway
Olympic Games
| Gold medal – first place | 2008 Beijing | Team |
World Championship
| Silver medal – second place | 2001 Italy | Team |
| Silver medal – second place | 2007 France | Team |
European Championship
| Gold medal – first place | 2004 Hungary | Team |
| Gold medal – first place | 2006 Sweden | Team |
| Gold medal – first place | 2010 Denmark/Norway | Team |
| Silver medal – second place | 2002 Denmark | Team |

Gro Hammerseng-Edin (born 10 April 1980 in Gjøvik as Gro Hammerseng) is a Norwegian former handballer who last played for the club Larvik HK. She was captain of the Norwegian national team for several years; in 2007, she was voted female World Handball Player of the Year.

She was included in the European Handball Federation Hall of Fame in 2023.

== Club career ==
Hammerseng started her handball career in 1990 at Gjøvik HK (1990–1995). She later played one year for Raufoss IL (1995–1996) and one year for Vardal IF (1996–1997) before starting her senior career in 1997 for Gjøvik og Vardal HK (1997–2003). Hammerseng was Gjøvik og Vardal's captain during her six seasons with the club. In 2003, after serious economic problems at her hometown club, Hammerseng signed with Danish top club Ikast-Bording, since November 2008 called FC Midtjylland Håndbold. Gro stayed 7 years in Denmark playing for the Danish club FC Midtjylland Håndbold, but on 17 February 2010 she signed under a 2-year contract with the Norwegian handball club Larvik HK. Gro has played for Larvik since the 2010/11 season and ended her career after the 2016/2017 season.

Hammerseng-Edin retired from the sport of handball on 21 May 2017, after winning the Grundigligaen finals with Larvik that day.

== National team ==
Hammerseng made her debut with the Norwegian national team on 29 November 2000 against Poland in Bergen, Norway. Her first major tournament was the 2000 European Championship in Romania, where Norway finished sixth. She received a silver medal at the 2001 World Championship and at the 2002 European Championship.

In December 2003, coach Marit Breivik made Hammerseng captain of the team, replacing fellow Gjøvik native Else-Marthe Sørlie Lybekk. The 2003 World Championship was her first competition as captain, but Norway was not successful and finished the championship in sixth place, thus missing the opportunity to participate in the 2004 Summer Olympics. The 2004 European Championship brought her first gold medal with the team. Hammerseng saw her performance recognized as she was voted MVP and member of the All-Star Team of the tournament.

After a serious knee injury kept her out of the court in the 2005/06 season, Gro Hammerseng repeated her 2004 success at the 2006 European Championship in Sweden. She received her second gold medal and was again named MVP and member of the All-Star Team of the tournament. At the 2007 World Championship, Norway was defeated by Russia in the final match, marking the third silver medal for Hammerseng. She was voted into the All-Star Team as best left back.

The 2008 Summer Olympics gave the Norwegians an opportunity for revenge, as they met Russia in the final match. After a comfortable 34–27 win, Hammerseng received her first Olympic gold medal.

As of 22 December 2010, she has played 167 games for Norway, scoring 631 goals.

== Awards and recognition ==
2004

- MVP - European Championship 2004 (Awarded in December 2004)
- All-Star Team: European Championship 2004 - Best Playmaker - (Awarded in December 2004)

2005

- All-Star Team: Danish League 2004/05 - Best Playmaker - (Awarded in May 2005)

2006

- MVP - European Championship 2006 (Awarded in December 2006)
- All-Star Team: European Championship 2006 - Best Playmaker - (Awarded in December 2006)
- 'Role model' of the year, Norwegian Sports Gala (Awarded in January 2007)
- 'Team Player' of the year, Norwegian Sports Gala (Awarded in January 2007)

2007

- 'Snill Pike Statuetten' - Norwegian media photographers (Awarded in March 2007)
- World Handball Player of the Year - Readers of World Handball Magazine and the International Handball Federation web site visitors. (Awarded in September 2008)
- All-Star Team: World Championship 2007 - Best Left Back - (Awarded in December 2007)

2008

- Casparprisen - Gjøvik City (Awarded in August 2008)

2009

- 'Player of the Year' voted by the Ikast-fans (Awarded in May 2009)

2010

- All-Star Team: European Championship 2010 - Best Playmaker - (Awarded in December 2010)
- 'Team Player' of the year, Norwegian Sports Gala (Awarded in January 2011)

2023

- European Handball Federation Hall of Fame.

== Personal life ==
Hammerseng was in a long-term cohabiting relationship with fellow Larvik HK and Norwegian national team player Katja Nyberg. In August 2010, they announced that they had split up even though they would continue to play together for Larvik.

Gro Hammerseng began a new relationship with Larvik teammate Anja Edin in the summer of 2010. They married in 2013. Hammerseng gave birth to their first son, Mio in 2012 and their second son, Leo in 2018. In 2014, Hammerseng and her wife published their book, Anja + Gro = Mio, which is about having a child as a lesbian couple.

In the lead-up to the 2008 Beijing Summer Olympics, Hammerseng joined other Norwegian athletes in an Amnesty International campaign for human rights in the People's Republic of China.

== Results ==
=== Norway ===
Olympic Games

- Gold: 2008

World Championship

- Silver: 2001, 2007

European Championship

- Gold: 2004, 2006, 2010
- Silver: 2002

=== FC Midtjylland Håndbold ===
Danish Championship

- Silver: 2007/08
- Bronze: 2003/04, 2004/05

Danish Cup (DM)

- Silver: 2003, 2004

Cup Winners' Cup

- Gold: 2003/04

EHF Cup

- Silver: 2006/07

=== Larvik HK ===
Norwegian League

- Gold: 2010/11, 2011/12, 2012/13, 2013/14, 2014/15, 2015/16, 2016/17

Norwegian Cup (NM)

- Gold: 2010, 2011, 2012, 2013, 2014, 2015, 2016

Norwegian Play-off

- Gold: 2010/11, 2011/12, 2012/13, 2013/14, 2014/15, 2015/16, 2016/17

Champions League

- Gold: 2010/11
- Silver: 2012/13, 2014/15

Awards
| Preceded by Nadine Krause | IHF World Player of the Year – Women; 2007 | Succeeded by Linn-Kristin Riegelhuth |
