= Yelena Polenova (handballer) =

Russian handball player (born 1983)

Yelena Ilyichivna Polenova
Personal information
- Nationality: Russian
- Born: 20 August 1983 (age 43) Uralsk, Kazakh SSR
- Height: 2.00 m (6 ft 7 in)

Sport
- Sport: Handball
- Position: Left back
- Current club: Retired

Senior clubs
- Years: Team
- 2000-2005: Dinamo Volgograd
- 2005-2010: Zvezda Zvenigorod
- 2010-2011: HC Astrakhanochka
- 2011-2012: Le Havre AC
- 2012-?: Blanzat Sport Montluçon
National team
Years	Team	Apps	(Gls)
–	Russia	106	(392)
Medal record
Representing Russia
Women's handball
Olympic Games
Silver medal – second place	2008 Beijing	Team
World Championship
Gold medal – first place	2005 Russia	Team
Gold medal – first place	2007 France	Team
European Championship
Silver medal – second place	2006 Sweden	Team
Bronze medal – third place	2008 Macedonia	Team

Yelena Ilyichivna Polenova (Russian: Елена Ильинична Полёнова) (born 20 August 1983 in Uralsk, Kazakh SSR) is a Russian team handball player, playing on the Russian women's national handball team. She won gold medal with the Russian winning team in the 2005 World Women's Handball Championship in Saint Petersburg, Russia, and again in the 2007 World Women's Handball Championship in France. She won a silver medal in the 2006 European Women's Handball Championship in Sweden. At the 2008 Olympics she won silver medals with the Russian team.

== Career ==
In 2005 she joined Dinamo Volgograd from Zvezda Zvenigorod. Here she won the 2007 Russian championship and EHF European League and the 2008 EHF Champions League. In 2011-12 she played a single season at HC Astrakhanochka, before joining Le Havre AC in the French league. After a year she joined Blanzat Sport Montluçon.
