= Oksana Romenskaya =

Russian handball player

Oksana Viktorovna Romenskaya
Personal information
- Nationality: Russian
- Born: 6 June 1976 (age 50) Rostov-on-Don, Russia
- Height: 1.90 m (6 ft 3 in)

Sport
- Sport: Handball
- Position: Pivot
- Current club: Retired

Senior clubs
- Years: Team
- 1992-1998: Rostselmash Rostov
- 1998-2000: HC Kuban Krasnodar
- 2000-2006: Handball Club Lada
- 2006-2008: Zvezda Zvenigorod
National team
| Years | Team | Apps | (Gls) |
| – | Russia | 169 | (246) |

Teams managed
- 2022-2023: Handball Club Lada (second team)
- 2023-2024: Handball Club Lada (assistent)
- 2024-: Russia youth
- 2024: Handball Club Lada
- 2024-: Handball Club Lada (second team)
Medal record
Olympic Games
| Silver medal – second place | 2008 Beijing | Team |
World Championship
| Gold medal – first place | 2001 Italy | Team |
| Gold medal – first place | 2005 Russia | Team |
| Gold medal – first place | 2007 France | Team |
European Championship
| Silver medal – second place | 2006 Sweden | Team |
| Bronze medal – third place | 2000 Romania | Team |
- Updated on 14 May 2010

Oksana Viktorovna Romenskaya (Russian: Оксана Викторовна Роменская; 6 June 1976 in Rostov-on-Don) is a Russian team handball player and coach, who played on the Russian women's national handball team. She won gold medal with the Russian winning team in the 2007 World Women's Handball Championship. Since 2024 she has coached Handball Club Lada, where she also played.

== Playing career ==
Romenskaya's first senior club was Rostselmash Rostov, where she won the 1994 Russian championship. In 1998 she joined HC Kuban Krasnodar, where she reached the final of the 2000 EHF Cup Winners' Cup. In 2000 she joined Handball Club Lada, where she won the Russian championship 5 times in a row from 2002 to 2006, as well as the 2002 EHF Cup Winners' Cup. In 2006 she joined Zvezda Zvenigorod, where she in 2007 once again won the Russian championship as well as the EHF Cup Winners' Cup. In 2008 she won the EHF Champions League.

== Coaching career ==
In 2022 she became the coach of the 2nd team at her former club Handball Club Lada. In 2023 she became the assistant coach. In January 2024 she became the coach of the Russian youth national team. By the championship round of the 2023-24 Russian championship she became the head coach at Handball Club Lada. For the 2024-25 she returned to coach the second team at the club.
