= Natalya Shipilova =

Russian handball player (born 1979)

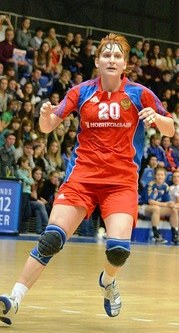
- Shipilova in 2011

Personal information
- Full name: Natalya Borisovna Shipilova
- Nationality: Russian
- Born: 31 December 1979 (age 46) Volgograd, Kyrgyzstan
- Height: 1.84 m (6 ft 0 in)

Sport
- Sport: Handball
- Position: Pivot
- Current club: Rostov-Don
- Number: 88

Senior clubs
- Years: Team
- -1999: Dinamo Volgograd
- 1999-2006: Handball Club Lada
- 2006-2008: Zvezda Zvenigorod
- 2008-2013: Handball Club Lada
National team
- Years: Team
- 2001-2013: Russia
Medal record
Olympic Games
Silver medal – second place	2008 Beijing	Team
World Women's Handball Championships
Gold medal – first place	2007 France	Team

Natalya Borisovna Shipilova (Russian: Наталья Борисовна Шипилова; December 31, 1979 in Volgograd) is a Russian team handball player, playing on the Russian women's national handball team. She won gold medals with the Russian winning team in the 2005 and 2007 World Women's Handball Championship.

She won a silver medal at the 2008 Summer Olympics.

== Career ==
Shipilova played initially basketball and started playing handball aged 16. Until 1999 she played for the 2nd team of Dinamo Volgograd. She then joined Handball Club Lada, where she played until 2006. Here she won the Russian championship 5 times in a arow from 2002 to 2006, the 2006 Russian Cup and the 2002 EHF Cup Winners' Cup.

In 2006 she joined league rivals Zvezda Zvenigorod, where she won the 2007 Russian championship and EHF European League and the 2008 EHF Champions League. Afterwards she returned to Handball Club Lada, where she won the 2012 EHF European League. She retired in 2013.

=== National team ===
Shipilova debuted for the Russian national team in 2001. Her first medal with the Russian team was at the 2005 World Championship. At the 2006 European Championship she won silver medals. At the 2007 World Championship she successfully defended the World Cup title, and 2008 Olympics she won silver medals. She also participated in the 2012 Olympics.
