= Katja Nyberg =

Norwegian handball player (born 1979)

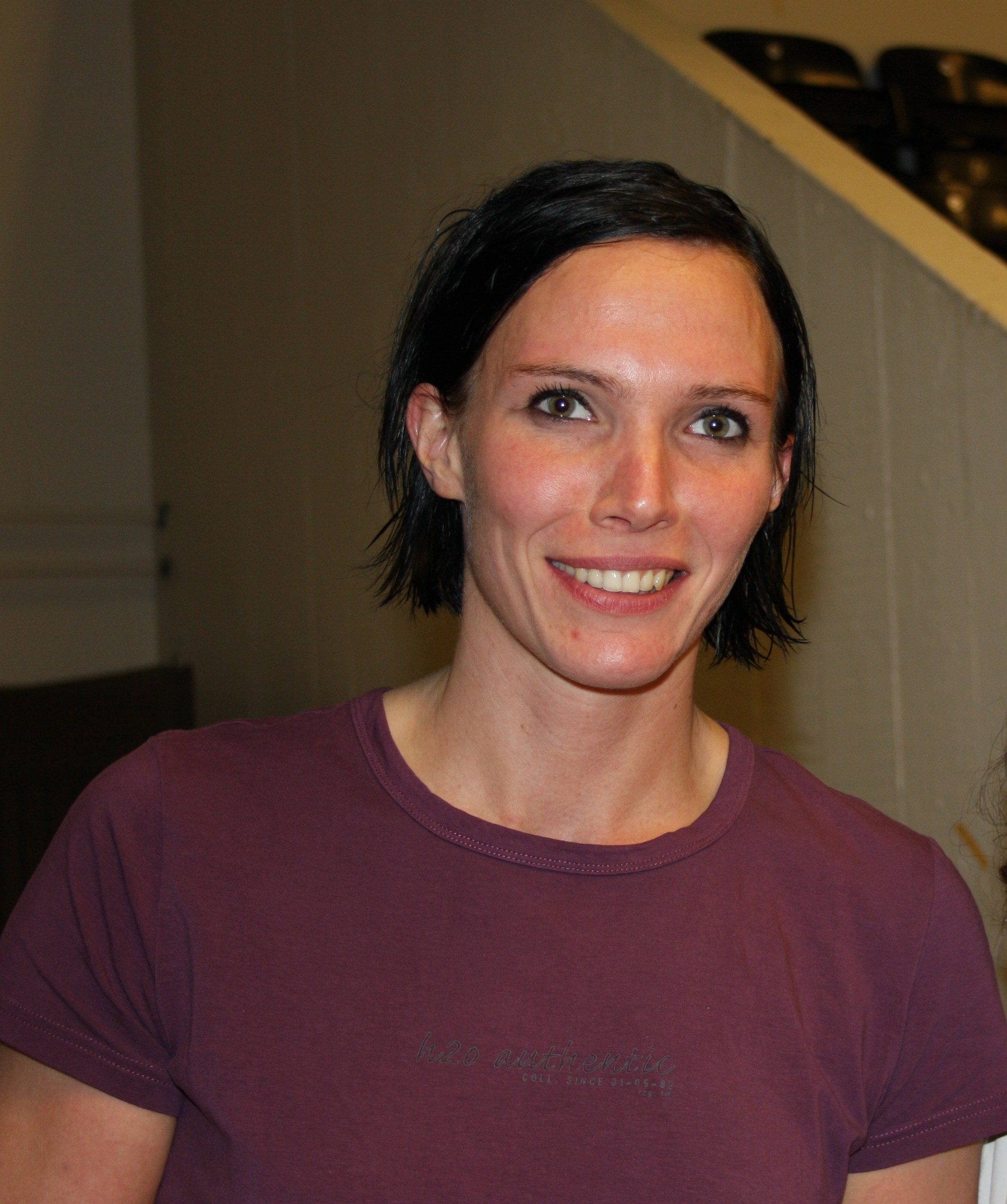
- Nyberg in 2008

Personal information
- Full name: Katja Johanna Alice Nyberg
- Nationality: Norwegian
- Born: 24 August 1979 (age 47) Stockholm, Sweden
- Height: 1.83 m (6.0 ft)

Sport
- Sport: Handball
- Position: Left back

Youth career
- Years: Team
- –1997: Sparta IF

Senior clubs
- Years: Team
- 1997–1998: Stockholmspolisens
- 1998–2005: Larvik HK
- 2005–2006: Krim Ljubljana
- 2006–2010: FC Midtjylland
- 2010–2012: Larvik HK
National team
Years	Team	Apps	(Gls)
2001–2008	Norway	99	(321)
Medal record
Women's handball
Representing Norway
Olympic Games
Gold medal – first place	2008 Beijing	Team
World Championship
Silver medal – second place	2007 France	Team
European Championship
Gold medal – first place	2004 Hungary	Team
Gold medal – first place	2006 Sweden	Team
Silver medal – second place	2002 Denmark	Team
- Updated on 31 December 2008

Katja Johanna Alice Nyberg (born 24 August 1979) is a naturalized Norwegian former handball player. She played 99 games and scored 321 goals for the Norwegian national team during her career. With the Norwegian team she won a gold medal at the 2008 Summer Olympics in Beijing and a silver medal at the 2007 World Women's Handball Championship in France, as well as two gold medals and one silver medal at the European Championships.

== Career ==
=== Early years ===
Katja Nyberg is the daughter of Robert Nyberg, the first Finnish handball player to play professionally abroad. She was born in Stockholm while Robert was living in Sweden. The family later relocated to Finland where she grew up. Nyberg played sports from an early age, mainly javelin throw and other athletics varieties. She started her handball career in Helsinki club Sparta IF with her father as coach.

=== Club career ===
Nyberg played for Sparta until she was 18. As handball in Finland was not competitive enough, she decided to pursue a professional career abroad. She first moved to Sweden where she played for Stockholmspolisens IF for one season (1997–1998), then signed a contract with Norwegian club Larvik HK and played there for 7 years (1998–2005).

During her seven seasons in Larvik, Nyberg achieved great success. She was named Player of the Year of the Norwegian league in 2001 and 2005. She also won the Cup Winners' Cup in 2004/05 and reached the semi-finals of the Champions League in 2001/02 and 2003/04. By the time she left the club, she had scored an average of 6.65 goals per match, with 765 goals in 115 matches.

In 2005, Nyberg signed a one-year contract with Slovenian champion Krim Ljubljana. However, her season in Ljubljana was prematurely ended in October of that year when she suffered a serious shoulder injury. It required surgery and kept her away from the handball court for nine months. By that time, her relationship with Gro Hammerseng had already become public and both had expressed their desire to play for the same club. They received offers from other clubs, but ultimately chose Ikast, where Hammerseng was already playing. Nyberg lived in Denmark and played for FC Midtjylland Håndbold for 4 years (2006–2010). On 17 February 2010, she signed a two-year contract with her former club Larvik HK and has played for them since the 2010/11 season.

=== National team ===
Katja Nyberg gained Norwegian citizenship on 16 January 2001 and made her debut with the national team on 23 March 2001 against France. She was not allowed to play for Norway in official tournaments until 2002 because she had competed at the 1999 Junior World Championship qualification for Finland.

Her first major competition as a Norwegian player was the 2002 European Championship where Norway received a silver medal. She then received a gold medal at the 2004 and 2006 European Championships.

Nyberg missed the 2005 World Championship due to the shoulder injury she suffered in Ljubljana, but she was with the team two years later when Norway won the silver medal at the 2007 World Championship in France. She was also voted Most Valuable Player of the tournament. Apart from this individual recognition, one of her biggest achievements with the national team to date was winning the gold medal at the 2008 Summer Olympics.

Nyberg played a total of 99 games and scored 321 goals for Norway between 2001 and 2008.

== National Handball Team results ==
NORWEGIAN NATIONAL TEAM

European Championship:

- Gold: 2004, 2006,
- silver in 2002

World Championship:

- Silver: 2007

Summer Olympics:

- Gold: 2008

== Club Handball results ==
With: Larvik HK

Norwegian League

- Gold: 99/00, 00/01, 01/02, 02/03, 04/05
- Bronze: 03/04

Norwegian Cup

- Gold: 99/00, 02/03, 03/04, 04/05
- Silver: 98/99

Norwegian Play-offs

- Gold: 04/05

EHF Cup Winner's Cup

- Gold: 04/05

EHF Champions League:

- Semi-finalist: 01/02, 03/04

With: Ikast-Bording Elitehåndbold

Danish League (DM):

- Silver: 07/08

EHF Cup:

- Silver: 06/07

== Awards and recognition ==
- Player of the year of the Norwegian league in 2001 and 2005
- Most Valuable Player at the 2007 World Championship
- Honorary member of the Finnish Handball Federation
- Honorary member of Sparta IF
