= Zvezda Zvenigorod =

Russian women's handball club

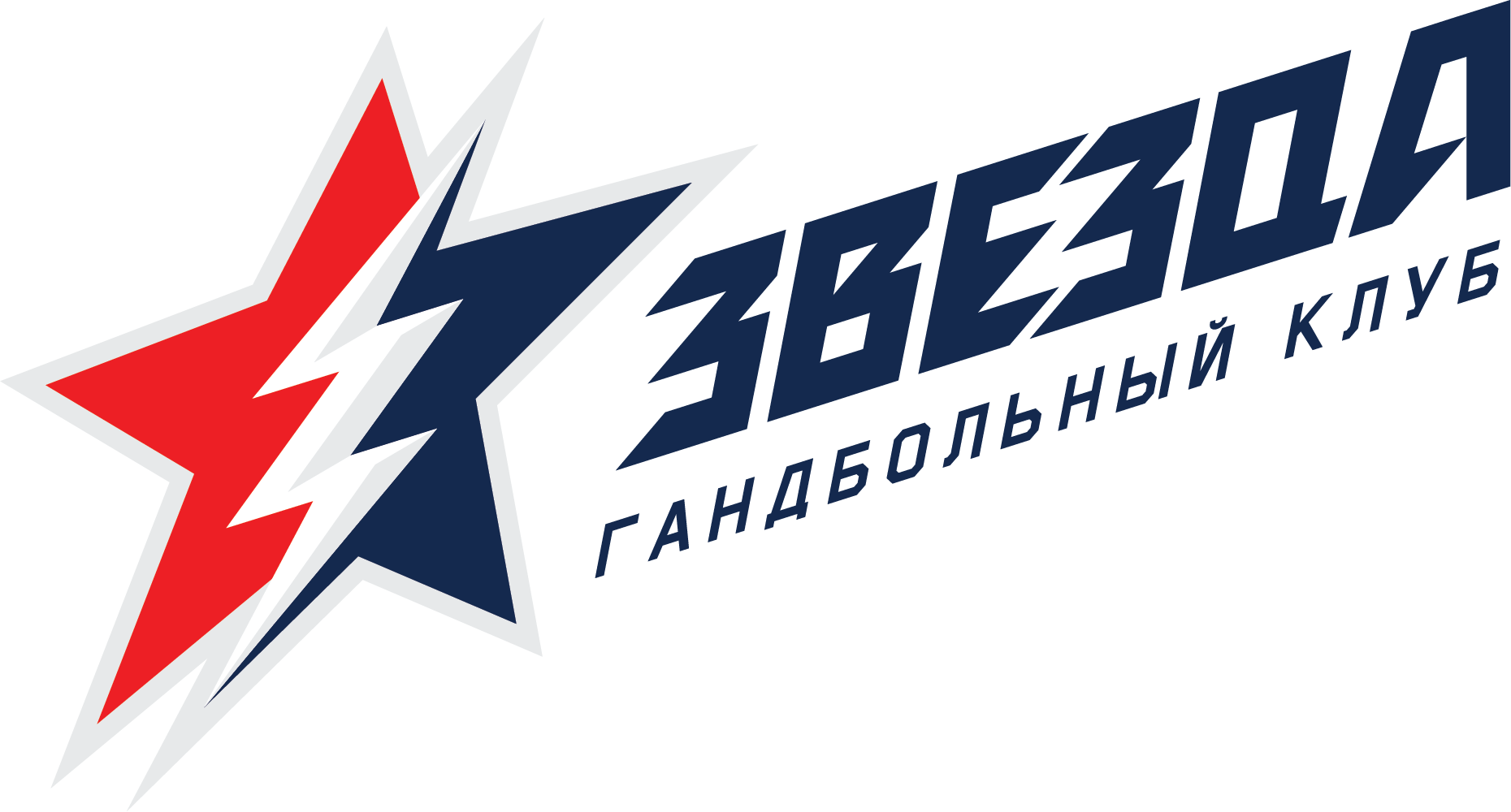
- Full name: Zvezda Zvenigorod
- Short name: Zvezda
- Founded: 2002
- Arena: Sport Hall Zvezda
- Capacity: 1,000
- Head coach: Alexey Gumyanov
- League: Russian Super League
- 2022-23: 5th
- Club colours
Home	Away

Zvezda Zvenigorod (Russian: Звезда Звенигород, lit. Star Zvenigorod) is a Russian women's handball club from Zvenigorod, near Moscow. They won the Champions League and the Champions Trophy in 2008, and the EHF Cup in 2006/07. Between 2006 and 2011 the club was coached by Russian national team trainer Evgeny Trefilov. In the summer of 2011 he was replaced by head coach Zdravko Zovko.

In reaction to the 2022 Russian invasion of Ukraine, the International Handball Federation banned Russian athletes, and the European Handball Federation suspended the Russian clubs from competing in European handball competitions.

== Achievements ==
=== Russia ===
- Russian Super League
  - Winners: 2007
  - Runners-up: 2008, 2009, 2010
  - Third place: 2006, 2013
- Russian Cup
  - Winners: 2009, 2010, 2011, 2014
  - Runners-up: 2012, 2013
  - Third place: 2015, 2019, 2022, 2026
- Russian Supercup
  - Winners: 2014

=== European competitions ===
- EHF Champions League
  - Winner: 2007–08
- Women's EHF Cup
  - Winners: 2006–07
- EHF Champions Trophy
  - Winners: 2008
  - Runners-up: 2007

== Team ==
=== Current squad ===
Squad for the 2020-21 season.

Goalkeepers

- 12 (Russia) Ekaterina Kirikias
- 48 (Russia) Yulia Dolgih
- 64 (Russia) Serafima Tikhanova

Wingers
RW

- 37 (Russia) Daria Kurmaz
- 77 (Russia) Albina Murzalieva

LW

- 8 (Russia) Victoriya Klimantseva
- 10 (Russia) Marianna Egorova
- 95 (Russia) Alexandra Karpova

Line players

- 22 (Kazakhstan) Irina Antonova
- 23 (Russia) Alina Sinelnikova
- 39 (Russia) Stanislava Gerasimova

Back players
LB

- 3 (Russia) Yuliya Chernova
- 5 (Russia) Alisa Dvorcevaya
- 11 (Russia) Anastasia Suslova
- 40 (Russia) Elizaveta Sobina
- 44 (Russia) Anastasia Shavman
- 81 (Russia) Kseniya Dyachenko

CB

- 4 (Russia) Nadezda Osipova
- 14 (Belarus) Aksana Pantus
- 50 (Russia) Lada Samoylenko
- 63 (Russia) Anastasiya Tserkovniuk (c)

RB

- 15 (Russia) Alina Triobchuk
- 20 (Russia) Valeriya Ganicheva
- 33 (Russia) Anna Nikolaeva
- 55 (Russia) Natalia Nikitina

== Notable players ==
- Irina Poltoratskaya
- Oxana Romenskaya
- Anna Kareyeva
- Elena Dmitrieva
- Anastasia Lobach
- Natalia Shipilova
- Yekaterina Andryushina
- Yelena Polenova
- Ekaterina Vetkova
- Polina Vyakhireva
- Liudmila Postnova
- Alexandra Lacrabere
- Samira Rocha
- Anna Kurepta
