= 2008 European Women's Handball Championship squads =

The following is a list of squads for each nation competing at the 2008 European Women's Handball Championship in the Republic of Macedonia. The tournament started on 2 December and the final took place in Skopje on 14 December.

Each nation had to submit an initial squad of 28 players, 12 of them became reserves when the final squad of 16 players was announced on 1 December.

Appearances, goals and ages as of 1 December 2008.

== Group A ==
=== Denmark ===
Head coach: Jan Pytlick

No.	Pos.	Name	Date of birth (age)	Height	App.	Goals	Club
2	LB	Rikke Skov (captain)	7 September 1980 (aged 28)	1.81 m	102	272	(Denmark) Viborg HK
3	RW	Maibritt Kviesgaard	15 May 1986 (aged 22)	1.71 m	28	61	(Denmark) GOG
4	P	Susan Thorsgaard	13 October 1988 (aged 20)	1.89 m	14	22	(Denmark) Ikast-Brande Elite Håndbold
5	LW	Mie Augustesen	19 July 1988 (aged 20)	1.77 m	13	48	(Denmark) Randers HK
7	CB	Lotte Grigel	5 April 1991 (aged 17)	1.63 m	4	11	(Denmark) Team Esbjerg
8	RB	Louise Mortensen	11 December 1979 (aged 28)	1.76 m	70	132	(Denmark) Aalborg DH
9	RB	Camilla Dalby	15 May 1988 (aged 20)	1.78 m	22	53	(Denmark) Randers HK
10	LW	Henriette Mikkelsen	21 September 1980 (aged 28)	1.68 m	78	42	(Denmark) Viborg HK
11	P	Lene Lund Nielsen	8 June 1979 (aged 29)	1.84 m	82	128	(Denmark) Viborg HK
12	GK	Karin Mortensen	26 September 1977 (aged 31)	1.80 m	155	4	(Denmark) SK Århus
13	RW	Josephine Touray	6 October 1979 (aged 29)	1.65 m	118	375	(Denmark) SK Århus
14	CB	Lærke Møller	14 January 1989 (aged 19)	1.71 m	13	41	(Denmark) Aalborg DH
15	LB	Katrine Fruelund	12 July 1978 (aged 30)	1.74 m	175	558	(Denmark) Randers HK
16	GK	Christina Pedersen	15 December 1982 (aged 25)	1.80 m	35	0	(Denmark) FCK Håndbold
17	LW	Gitte Aaen	7 November 1981 (aged 27)	1.68 m	23	57	(Denmark) Viborg HK
18	P	Kamilla Kristensen	2 September 1983 (aged 25)	1.83 m	46	91	(Denmark) GOG
22	LB	Trine Troelsen	2 May 1985 (aged 23)	1.72 m	45	64	(Denmark) SK Århus

=== France ===
Head coach: Olivier Krumbholz

No.	Pos.	Name	Date of birth (age)	Height	App.	Goals	Club
2	LP	Julie Goiorani	25 May 1988 (aged 20)	1.72 m	10	19	(France) HBC Nîmes
4	LP	Nina Kamto N'jitam	5 June 1983 (aged 25)	1.78 m	99	170	(France) Metz Handball
5	RB	Camille Ayglon	21 May 1985 (aged 23)	1.80 m	47	98	(France) Metz Handball
6	CB	Angélique Spincer	25 June 1984 (aged 24)	1.73 m	46	198	(France) Issy-les-Moulineaux Handball
9	LW	Paule Baudouin	25 October 1984 (aged 24)	1.72 m	81	188	(Denmark) Team Esbjerg
10	CB	Allison Pineau	2 May 1989 (aged 19)	1.81 m	34	55	(France) Issy-les-Moulineaux Handball
11	RW	Maakan Tounkara	12 March 1983 (aged 25)	1.65 m	56	108	(France) Le Havre AC Handball
12	GK	Amandine Leynaud	2 May 1986 (aged 22)	1.78 m	50	0	(France) Metz Handball
14	LB	Stéphanie N'Tsama Akoa	24 January 1984 (aged 24)	1.84 m	10	3	(France) ES Besançon
16	GK	Cléopâtre Darleux	1 July 1989 (aged 19)	1.76 m	8	0	(France) Issy-les-Moulineaux Handball
17	LW	Siraba Dembélé	28 June 1986 (aged 22)	1.72 m	48	104	(France) Issy-les-Moulineaux Handball
19	RW	Audrey Deroin	6 September 1989 (aged 19)	1.74 m	10	9	(France) Issy-les-Moulineaux Handball
20	LW	Raphaëlle Tervel (captain)	21 April 1979 (aged 29)	1.78 m	178	311	(Spain) Akaba Bera Bera
21	LB	Marion Limal	12 January 1987 (aged 21)	1.84 m	10	16	(France) ES Besançon
22	RW	Katty Piejos	21 August 1981 (aged 27)	1.63 m	25	26	(France) Metz Handball
23	RB	Alexandra Lacrabère	27 April 1987 (aged 21)	1.77 m	33	54	(Spain) Akaba Bera Bera

=== Hungary ===
Head coach:Vilmos Imre

No.	Pos.	Name	Date of birth (age)	Height	App.	Goals	Club
1	GK	Melinda Pastrovics	28 May 1981 (aged 27)	1.78 m	10	0	(Hungary) DVSC-Aquaticum
3	P	Barbara Balogh	22 October 1985 (aged 23)	1.86 m	5	6	(Hungary) Dunaferr NK
6	LW	Orsolya Vérten	22 July 1982 (aged 26)	1.70 m	85	250	(Hungary) Györi Audi ETO KC
7	CB	Zita Szucsánszki	22 May 1987 (aged 21)	1.73 m	23	58	(Hungary) Budapest Bank-FTC
9	LW	Melinda Vincze	12 November 1983 (aged 25)	1.73 m	9	10	(Hungary) Dunaferr NK
10	LB	Anita Bulath	20 September 1983 (aged 25)	1.80 m	4	10	(Croatia) HC Podravka Vegeta
12	GK	Orsolya Herr	23 November 1984 (aged 24)	1.76 m	61	0	(Hungary) Györi Audi ETO KC
13	CB	Anita Görbicz	13 May 1983 (aged 25)	1.73 m	148	657	(Hungary) Györi Audi ETO KC
16	GK	Katalin Pálinger	6 December 1978 (aged 29)	1.83 m	226	1	(Hungary) Györi Audi ETO KC
18	P	Piroska Szamoránsky	9 July 1986 (aged 22)	1.71 m	61	149	(Hungary) Budapest Bank-FTC
20	RB	Anett Sopronyi	27 November 1986 (aged 22)	1.78 m	3	4	(Hungary) Tajtavill-Nyíradony
22	RW	Bernadett Bódi	9 March 1986 (aged 22)	1.75 m	24	31	(Denmark) Randers HK
23	LB	Gabriella Szűcs	31 August 1984 (aged 24)	1.84 m	86	134	(Romania) CS Oltchim Râmnicu Vâlcea
31	RB	Ágnes Hornyák	2 September 1982 (aged 26)	1.80 m	78	60	(Hungary) Györi Audi ETO KC
83	RW	Mónika Kovacsicz	20 November 1983 (aged 25)	1.70 m	64	166	(Denmark) Viborg HK
87	LB	Zsuzsanna Tomori	18 June 1987 (aged 21)	1.86 m	44	76	(Hungary) Györi Audi ETO KC

=== Romania ===
Head coach: Radu Voina

No.	Pos.	Name	Date of birth (age)	Height	App.	Goals	Club
1	GK	Florentina Stanciu	28 July 1982 (aged 26)	1.82 m	7	0	(Iceland) Stjarnan
2	RW	Ramona Maier	14 July 1979 (aged 29)	1.70 m	125	353	(Romania) CS Oltchim Râmnicu Vâlcea
3	RW	Cătălina Cioaric	11 February 1982 (aged 26)	1.75 m	8	10	(Romania) HC Oțelul Galați
4	PV	Florina Bîrsan	6 December 1985 (aged 22)	1.78 m	16	12	(Romania) CS Universitatea Jolidon Cluj
5	LB	Carmen Amariei	13 September 1978 (aged 30)	1.84 m	112	625	(Romania) CS Rulmentul Urban Brașov
6	LW	Camelia Balint	27 October 1984 (aged 24)	1.73 m	11	11	(Romania) HC Municipal Baia Mare
7	LB	Daniela Crap	27 September 1984 (aged 24)	1.82 m	21	40	(Hungary) DVSC-Aquaticum
8	LB	Cristina Neagu	26 August 1988 (aged 20)	1.78 m	19	64	(Romania) CS Rulmentul Urban Brașov
11	PV	Oana Manea	18 April 1985 (aged 23)	1.76 m	64	102	(Romania) CS Oltchim Râmnicu Vâlcea
12	GK	Paula Ungureanu	30 March 1980 (aged 28)	1.80 m	67	1	(Croatia) HC Podravka Vegeta
15	LW	Valentina Ardean-Elisei	5 June 1982 (aged 26)	1.72 m	100	467	(Romania) CS Oltchim Râmnicu Vâlcea
16	GK	Luminița Dinu	6 November 1971 (aged 37)	1.82 m	174	8	(Romania) CS Oltchim Râmnicu Vâlcea
17	RB	Oana Şoit	3 May 1981 (aged 27)	1.78 m	35	43	(Spain) CBF Prestigio
18	CB	Adina Fiera	11 August 1985 (aged 23)	1.82 m	59	139	(Romania) CS Oltchim Râmnicu Vâlcea
55	RB	Melinda Geiger	28 March 1987 (aged 21)	1.76 m	14	17	(Romania) HC Municipal Baia Mare
99	CB	Narcisa Lecușanu	14 September 1976 (aged 32)	1.82 m	66	165	(Romania) CS Oltchim Râmnicu Vâlcea

== Group B ==
=== Norway ===
Head coach: Marit Breivik

No.	Pos.	Name	Date of birth (age)	Height	App.	Goals	Club
1	GK	Kari Aalvik Grimsbø	4 January 1985 (aged 23)	1.80 m	40	0	(Norway) Byåsen IL
4	RW	Ragnhild Aamodt	9 September 1980 (aged 28)	1.63 m	126	305	(Denmark) Ikast-Brande Elite Håndbold
6	P	Heidi Løke	12 December 1982 (aged 25)	1.77 m	11	24	(Norway) Larvik HK
7	RB/W	Tonje Nøstvold	7 May 1985 (aged 23)	1.78 m	88	184	(Denmark) Ikast-Brande Elite Håndbold
8	B	Karoline Dyhre Breivang	10 May 1980 (aged 28)	1.72 m	163	303	(Norway) Larvik HK
9	CB	Kristine Lunde (captain)	30 March 1980 (aged 28)	1.83 m	126	383	(Denmark) Viborg HK
11	LW	Kari Mette Johansen	11 January 1979 (aged 29)	1.72 m	119	330	(Norway) Larvik HK
12	GK	Terese Pedersen	27 April 1980 (aged 28)	1.83 m	58	0	(Denmark) Randers HK
13	P	Marit Malm Frafjord	25 November 1985 (aged 23)	1.82 m	69	146	(Norway) Byåsen IL
14	LB	Tonje Larsen	26 January 1975 (aged 33)	1.83 m	236	512	(Norway) Larvik HK
15	CB	Tine Rustad Kristiansen	12 February 1980 (aged 28)	1.77 m	14	23	(Norway) Larvik HK
16	GK	Katrine Lunde Haraldsen	30 March 1980 (aged 28)	1.81 m	126	1	(Denmark) Viborg HK
17	RB/W	Linn Jørum Sulland	15 July 1984 (aged 24)	1.78 m	59	88	(Norway) Stabæk IF
18	RB/W	Linn-Kristin Riegelhuth	1 August 1984 (aged 24)	1.76 m	120	434	(Norway) Larvik HK
20	P	Isabel Blanco	10 May 1979 (aged 29)	1.75 m	63	139	(Denmark) Ikast-Brande Elite Håndbold
23	LW	Camilla Herrem	8 October 1986 (aged 22)	1.66 m	29	68	(Norway) Byåsen IL

=== Spain ===
Head coach: Jorge Dueñas

No.	Pos.	Name	Date of birth (age)	Height	App.	Goals	Club
1	GK	Cristina González	6 August 1983 (aged 25)	1.79 m	21	0	(Spain) C.Le.Ba León
2	CB	Tatiana Garmendia	16 February 1974 (aged 34)	1.69 m	92	186	(Spain) Akaba Bera Bera
4	RW	Carmen Martín	29 May 1988 (aged 20)	1.69 m	25	42	(Spain) Mar Alicante
6	CB	Andrea Barnó	4 January 1980 (aged 28)	1.74 m	6	10	(Spain) Itxako Navarra
7	LB	Beatriz Fernández	19 March 1985 (aged 23)	1.80 m	45	92	(Spain) Mar Alicante
8	LP	Verónica Cuadrado	8 March 1979 (aged 29)	1.82 m	69	66	(Spain) BM Sagunto
9	RB	Marta Mangué	23 April 1983 (aged 25)	1.70 m	140	523	(Denmark) Team Esbjerg
10	CB	Macarena Aguilar	12 March 1985 (aged 23)	1.70 m	70	200	(Spain) BM Sagunto
11	CB	Nuria Benzal	3 April 1985 (aged 23)	1.69 m	3	5	(Spain) BM Sagunto
12	GK	Mihaela Ciobanu	30 January 1973 (aged 35)	1.75 m	0	0	(Spain) Cem. La Unión Ribarroja
13	RW	Jesica Alonso	20 September 1983 (aged 25)	1.72 m	10	16	(Spain) Itxako Navarra
14	LB	Elisabet Chávez	17 November 1990 (aged 18)	1.92 m	4	0	(Spain) BM Sagunto
17	LW	Elisabeth Pinedo	13 May 1981 (aged 27)	1.74 m	32	53	(Spain) Itxako Navarra
18	LP	Begoña Fernández	22 March 1980 (aged 28)	1.82 m	82	140	(Spain) Itxako Navarra
20	LW	Noelia Oncina (captain)	11 November 1976 (aged 32)	1.66 m	147	367	(Spain) BM Sagunto
21	LB	Zornitsa Koleva	4 August 1979 (aged 29)	1.88 m	4	8	(Spain) Vícar Goya

=== Portugal ===
Head coach: Paula Castro

No.	Pos.	Name	Date of birth (age)	Height	App.	Goals	Club
1	GK	Daniela Pereira	23 July 1990 (aged 18)	1.92 m	65	0	(Portugal) Colégio de Gaia
2		Alexandrina Barbosa	5 May 1986 (aged 22)	1.75 m	138	845	(Romania) CS Rulmentul Urban Brașov
3		Ana Miriam Sousa	23 April 1985 (aged 23)	1.75 m	170	529	(Italy) S.S. Pallamano Bancole
6		Ana Andrade	1 March 1988 (aged 20)	1.73 m	32	31	(Portugal) Colégio de Gaia
7		Liana Ferreira	5 July 1981 (aged 27)	1.73 m	32	29	(Portugal) Gil Eanes
8		Fernanda Carvalho	23 December 1977 (aged 30)	1.77 m	73	66	(Portugal) Colégio de Gaia
9		Eduarda Pinheiro	10 June 1988 (aged 20)	1.76 m	57	111	(Portugal) Colégio Joao de Barros
10		Diana Fernandes	9 June 1983 (aged 25)	1.60 m	45	38	(Portugal) Colégio de Gaia
11		Paula Ferreira	27 January 1973 (aged 35)	1.65 m	80	209	(Spain) Farho-B.M. Gijón
12	GK	Tania Silva	21 May 1983 (aged 25)	1.78 m	131	1	(Spain) CB Atlético Guardés
13		Ana Correia	25 April 1988 (aged 20)	1.74 m	36	60	(Portugal) Madeira Andebol SAD
14		Renata Tavares	11 November 1978 (aged 30)	1.76 m	142	228	(Portugal) Madeira Andebol SAD
16	GK	Virginia Ganau	11 May 1977 (aged 31)	1.72 m	160	0	(Portugal) Madeira Andebol SAD
18		Vera Lopes	1 April 1982 (aged 26)	1.70 m	67	70	(Portugal) Gil Eanes
19		Ana Seabra	31 July 1977 (aged 31)	1.65 m	195	761	(Portugal) Madeira Andebol SAD
23		Juliana Sousa	26 June 1977 (aged 31)	1.79 m	182	682	(Romania) CS Rulmentul Urban Brașov

=== Ukraine ===
Head coach: Leonid Yevtushenko

No.	Pos.	Name	Date of birth (age)	Height	App.	Goals	Club
1	GK	Tetyana Chukhno	30 August 1986 (aged 22)	1.85 m	5	0	(Ukraine) Spartak Kyiv
2	RW	Mariya Boklashchuk	4 September 1979 (aged 29)	1.68 m	38	75	(Russia) Zvezda Zvenigorod
4	LB	Anastasiya Pidpalova	5 January 1982 (aged 26)	1.92 m	26	90	(Ukraine) HC Motor Zaporizhzhia
5	RB	Maryna Vergelyuk	24 June 1978 (aged 30)	1.81 m	134	506	(Slovenia) RK Krim Mercator
6	RW	Yuliya Manaharova	27 September 1988 (aged 20)	1.66 m	23	51	(Ukraine) HC Sparta Kryvy Rih
7	LW	Viktoriya Borshchenko	5 January 1986 (aged 22)	1.72 m	25	52	(Ukraine) SC Galytchanka Lviv
8	LW	Yana Batkova	2 November 1988 (aged 20)	1.71 m	5	4	(Ukraine) HC Motor Zaporizhzhia
9	CB	Regina Shymkute	21 December 1985 (aged 22)	1.76 m	77	85	(Ukraine) SC Galytchanka Lviv
10	CB	Anastasiya Sokol	5 November 1984 (aged 24)	1.87 m	27	48	(Russia) Zvezda Zvenigorod
11	LP	Lilia Gorilska	26 February 1988 (aged 20)	m	2	1	(Ukraine) HC Sparta Kryvy Rih
12	GK	Viktoriya Tymoshenkova	4 November 1983 (aged 25)	1.83 m	29	0	(Ukraine) SC Galytchanka Lviv
13		Nataliya Skunzyak	21 April 1986 (aged 22)	1.74 m	13	21	(Ukraine) HC Karpaty Uzhhorod
15	RB	Olga Laiuk	17 May 1984 (aged 24)	1.82 m	21	41	(Ukraine) HC Motor Zaporizhzhia
16	GK	Iryna Honcharova	17 December 1974 (aged 33)	1.80 m	79	4	(Serbia) ŽRK Naisa
17	RB	Olha Nikolayenko	5 April 1983 (aged 25)	1.78 m	10	28	(Hungary) Hódmezővásárhelyi NKC
23	LP	Iryna Sheyenko	5 March 1983 (aged 25)	1.80 m	50	119	(Ukraine) HC Motor Zaporizhzhia

== Group C ==
=== Austria ===
Head coach: Herbert Müller

No.	Pos.	Name	Date of birth (age)	Height	App.	Goals	Club
1	GK	Natascha Schilk	6 July 1989 (aged 19)	1.66 m	31	0	(Austria) Hypo Niederösterreich
3		Gabriele Grossberger	30 July 1983 (aged 25)	1.73 m	6	0	(Austria) UHC Goldmanndruck Tulln
4	LB	Beate Scheffknecht	27 February 1990 (aged 18)	1.76 m	21	68	(Germany) 1. FC Nürnberg
5	RW	Tamara Bösch	5 June 1989 (aged 19)	1.72 m	27	23	(Switzerland) LC Brühl Handball
8		Corinna Flandorfer	31 May 1985 (aged 23)	1.65 m	31	33	(Austria) UHC Goldmanndruck Tulln
9	CB	Laura Magelinskas	23 September 1989 (aged 19)	1.78 m	49	92	(Germany) TV Nellingen
10	CB	Marina Budecevic	25 November 1982 (aged 26)	1.77 m	51	78	(Austria) Hypo Niederösterreich
11	RW	Sabrina Thurner	6 March 1987 (aged 21)	1.75 m	60	66	(Austria) Hypo Niederösterreich
12	GK	Elisabeth Herbst	30 December 1985 (aged 22)	1.76 m	56	0	(Germany) TUS Weibern
13		Sabrina Hödl	30 December 1990 (aged 17)	1.65 m	6	4	(Austria) Hypo Niederösterreich
14	CB	Nina Stumvoll	16 June 1989 (aged 19)	1.74 m	37	38	(Austria) Hypo Niederösterreich
15		Sabrina Stumvoll	14 September 1990 (aged 18)	1.75 m	4	0	(Austria) Hypo Niederösterreich
16	GK	Petra Blazek	15 June 1987 (aged 21)	1.82 m	75	0	(Austria) Hypo Niederösterreich
17	LW	Isabel Plach	19 April 1987 (aged 21)	1.67 m	67	74	(Austria) Hypo Niederösterreich
19	RB	Katrin Engel	2 May 1984 (aged 24)	1.72 m	127	384	(Germany) 1. FC Nürnberg
77	LB	Gorica Acimovic	28 February 1985 (aged 23)	1.85 m	7	39	(Austria) Hypo Niederösterreich

=== Belarus ===
Head coach: Konstantin Charovarov

No.	Pos.	Name	Date of birth (age)	Height	App.	Goals	Club
1	GK	Alesya Safonova	30 November 1979 (aged 29)	1.83 m	33	0	(Belarus) BNTU Minsk
3		Hanna Paheryla	1 August 1981 (aged 27)	1.72 m	24	25	(Belarus) SHC Gorodnichanka Grodno
4		Anastasia Kamenshykova	25 June 1987 (aged 21)	1.82 m	8	14	(Ukraine) SC Galytchanka Lviv
5		Iryna Mahilina	20 December 1982 (aged 25)	1.78 m	24	61	(Ukraine) HC Motor Zaporoshje
6		Irute Haizhutsite	3 July 1986 (aged 22)	1.84 m	12	34	(Russia) KSK Luch Moscow
8		Tatsiana Bobryk	18 July 1982 (aged 26)	1.82 m	3	3	(Belarus) SHC Gorodnichanka Grodno
9		Natallia Platanovich	25 October 1981 (aged 27)	1.81 m	4	2	(Belarus) SHC Gorodnichanka Grodno
10		Yuliya Bulava	6 June 1983 (aged 25)	1.77 m	6	14	(Belarus) SHC Gorodnichanka Grodno
11		Liliya Artsiukhovich	21 August 1987 (aged 21)	1.79 m	26	79	(Ukraine) SC Galytchanka Lviv
12	GK	Yauheniya Evdokimovich	10 January 1984 (aged 24)	1.85 m	23	0	(Belarus) BNTU Minsk
13		Inhute Haizhutsite	3 July 1986 (aged 22)	1.84 m	14	54	(Russia) KSK Luch Moscow
14		Alesia Kurchankova	4 July 1980 (aged 28)	1.70 m	44	155	(Spain) Vícar Goya
15		Irina Dronova	9 February 1981 (aged 27)	1.67 m	2	2	GGK
16	GK	Elena Abramovich	18 July 1981 (aged 27)	1.86 m	45	0	(Hungary) Hódmezővásárhelyi NKC
17		Tatiana Milaya	11 August 1986 (aged 22)	1.71 m	0	0	(Belarus) HC Druts
18		Valiantsina Hrygorieva	16 August 1987 (aged 21)	1.89 m	13	44	(Belarus) SHC Gorodnichanka Grodno

=== Russia ===
Head coach: Evgeny Trefilov

No.	Pos.	Name	Date of birth (age)	Height	App.	Goals	Club
1	GK	Inna Suslina	5 January 1979 (aged 29)	1.84 m	142	0	(Russia) Zvezda Zvenigorod
2	CB	Tatiana Khmyrova	6 February 1990 (aged 18)	1.76 m	0	0	(Russia) Dinamo Volgograd
3	CB	Irina Poltoratskaya	12 March 1979 (aged 29)	1.77 m	154	104	(Russia) Zvezda Zvenigorod
4	RW	Alexandra Krannykh	7 April 1985 (aged 23)	1.78 m	8	17	(Russia) Zvezda Zvenigorod
7	LW	Elena Dmitrieva	1 July 1983 (aged 25)	1.75 m	61	117	(Russia) Zvezda Zvenigorod
8	LB	Olga Levina	4 March 1985 (aged 23)	1.80 m	39	102	(Russia) Dinamo Volgograd
10	LB	Elena Polenova	20 August 1983 (aged 25)	1.98 m	99	374	(Russia) Zvezda Zvenigorod
11	LW	Emiliya Turey	6 October 1984 (aged 24)	1.75 m	120	391	(Denmark) FCK Handball
12	GK	Anna Sedoykina	1 August 1984 (aged 24)	1.90 m	27	0	(Russia) Dinamo Volgograd
13	RW	Marina Yartseva	17 February 1989 (aged 19)	1.65 m	0	0	(Russia) Rostov-Don
14	LB	Oxana Koroleva	17 July 1984 (aged 24)	1.85 m	41	74	(Russia) Zvezda Zvenigorod
15	LP	Maia Kaverina-Petrova	26 May 1982 (aged 26)	1.78 m	3	3	(Russia) Rostov-Don
18	LB	Nadezhda Muravyeva	30 June 1980 (aged 28)	1.86 m	117	256	(Russia) Lada Togliatti
19	LP	Ekaterina Vetkova	1 August 1986 (aged 22)	1.82 m	11	16	(Russia) Zvezda Zvenigorod
20	RB	Ekaterina Davydenko	7 March 1989 (aged 19)	1.83 m	8	28	(Russia) Lada Togliatti
21	LB	Viktoriya Zhilinskayte	6 March 1989 (aged 19)	1.88 m	8	13	(Russia) Lada Togliatti

=== Sweden ===
Head coach: Ulf Schefvert

No.	Pos.	Name	Date of birth (age)	Height	App.	Goals	Club
2	LB	Karin Isaksson	4 March 1984 (aged 24)	1.76 m	5	7	(Sweden) IK Sävehof
3	LP	Tina Flognman	29 June 1981 (aged 27)	1.78 m	145	281	(Denmark) GOG
4	LW	Matilda Boson	4 December 1981 (aged 27)	1.76 m	133	318	(Denmark) Aalborg DH
5	LP	Sara Holmgren	29 March 1979 (aged 29)	1.81 m	114	136	(Germany) HC Leipzig
6	CB	Therese Islas Helgesson	22 July 1983 (aged 25)	1.72 m	56	106	(Norway) Nordstrand IF
7	RW	Jenny Wikensten	1 August 1988 (aged 20)	1.70 m	6	1	(Sweden) IK Sävehof
8	LP	Fride Toveby	29 July 1982 (aged 26)	1.74 m	20	21	(Denmark) Aalborg DH
9	LW	Petra Skogsberg	8 February 1984 (aged 24)	1.62 m	44	48	(Denmark) GOG
10	RW	Teresa Utković	31 July 1980 (aged 28)	1.70 m	73	158	(Denmark) Aalborg DH
12	GK	Gabriella Kain	25 March 1981 (aged 27)	1.79 m	6	0	(Denmark) GOG
14	LB	Sara Eriksson	13 April 1981 (aged 27)	1.82 m	114	163	(Germany) HC Leipzig
15	LB	Johanna Ahlm	3 October 1987 (aged 21)	1.75 m	40	155	(Sweden) IK Sävehof
16	GK	Madeleine Grundström	12 August 1980 (aged 28)	1.81 m	140	0	(Denmark) Aalborg DH
17	LB	Linnea Torstenson	30 March 1983 (aged 25)	1.86 m	56	216	(Denmark) Aalborg DH
18	LP	Johanna Wiberg	6 September 1983 (aged 25)	1.84 m	78	54	(Denmark) FCK Håndbold
20	CB	Isabelle Gulldén	29 June 1989 (aged 19)	1.79 m	23	27	(Sweden) IK Sävehof

== Group D ==
=== Croatia ===
Head coach: Zdravko Zovko

No.	Pos.	Name	Date of birth (age)	Height	App.	Goals	Club
1	GK	Sanela Knezović	22 December 1979 (aged 28)	1.85 m	51	0	(Hungary) Dunaferr NK
2	CB	Miranda Tatari	20 September 1983 (aged 25)	1.74 m	50	141	(Croatia) HC Podravka Vegeta
3	LB	Nina Jukopila	6 June 1983 (aged 25)	1.73 m	17	17	(Croatia) RK Trešnjevka
5	RW	Dijana Golubić	21 May 1984 (aged 24)	1.70 m	82	168	(Slovenia) RK Krim Mercator
7	LP	Tihana Ambroš	7 June 1980 (aged 28)	1.91 m	39	37	(Montenegro) ŽRK Budućnost T-Mobile
8	RW	Anita Gaće	14 April 1983 (aged 25)	1.77 m	66	111	(Croatia) HC Podravka Vegeta
9	LB	Maida Arslanagić	20 April 1984 (aged 24)	1.85 m	75	225	(Denmark) KIF Vejen Kolding
10	LW	Nikica Pušić	19 March 1983 (aged 25)	1.77 m	97	213	(Croatia) HC Lokomotiva Zagreb
11	LP	Martina Pavić	27 October 1988 (aged 20)	1.78 m	0	0	(Croatia) RK Trešnjevka
12	GK	Jelena Grubišić	20 January 1987 (aged 21)	1.84 m	31	1	(Croatia) HC Lokomotiva Zagreb
13	RB	Lidija Horvat	5 May 1982 (aged 26)	1.84 m	80	160	(Romania) CS Rulmentul Urban Brașov
15	LB	Andrea Penezić	13 November 1985 (aged 23)	1.86 m	51	133	(Croatia) HC Podravka Vegeta
16	GK	Ivana Jelčić	16 March 1980 (aged 28)	1.79 m	112	0	(Croatia) HC Podravka Vegeta
17	LB	Kristina Franić	22 May 1987 (aged 21)	1.80 m	70	48	(Croatia) HC Podravka Vegeta
18	CB	Ivana Lovrić	1 September 1984 (aged 24)	1.73 m	34	52	(France) Metz Handball
19	LW	Maja Zebić	31 May 1982 (aged 26)	1.78 m	70	179	(Croatia) HC Podravka Vegeta
21	RB	Ivana Petković	6 June 1985 (aged 23)	1.77 m	3	7	(Croatia) ŽRK Trogir

=== Germany ===
Head coach: Armin Emrich

No.	Pos.	Name	Date of birth (age)	Height	App.	Goals	Club
1	GK	Sabine Englert	27 November 1981 (aged 27)	1.84 m	152	2	(Austria) Hypo Niederösterreich
4	RB	Grit Jurack (captain)	22 October 1977 (aged 31)	1.86 m	276	1461	(Denmark) Viborg HK
5	CB	Ania Rösler	14 May 1982 (aged 26)	1.76 m	30	31	(Germany) 1. FC Nürnberg
6	LW	Sara Walzik	18 April 1987 (aged 21)	1.64 m	13	22	(Germany) 1. FC Nürnberg
7	CB	Nina Wörz	14 November 1980 (aged 28)	1.79 m	149	287	(Denmark) Randers HK
8	LP	Anne Müller	5 July 1983 (aged 25)	1.76 m	99	136	(Germany) TSV Bayer 04 Leverkusen
9	LB	Laura Steinbach	2 August 1985 (aged 23)	1.81 m	24	33	(Germany) TSV Bayer 04 Leverkusen
10	CB	Anna Loerper	18 November 1984 (aged 24)	1.62 m	93	136	(Germany) TSV Bayer 04 Leverkusen
11	LW	Mandy Hering	11 March 1984 (aged 24)	1.70 m	57	103	(Germany) FHC Frankfurt/Oder
12	GK	Jana Krause	10 June 1987 (aged 21)	1.88 m	12	0	(Germany) 1. FC Nürnberg
13	LB	Nadine Krause	25 March 1982 (aged 26)	1.78 m	160	664	(Denmark) FCK Håndbold
15	RW	Sabrina Neukamp	10 May 1982 (aged 26)	1.73 m	85	130	(Germany) HSG Blomberg-Lippe
16	GK	Clara Woltering	2 March 1983 (aged 25)	1.75 m	92	0	(Germany) TSV Bayer 04 Leverkusen
17	RB	Christina Rohde	22 April 1982 (aged 26)	1.82 m	8	4	(Germany) 1. FC Nürnberg
19	RW	Stefanie Melbeck	16 April 1977 (aged 31)	1.74 m	193	408	(Denmark) KIF Vejen
20	LP	Anja Althaus	3 September 1982 (aged 26)	1.74 m	140	285	(Denmark) Viborg HK

=== Macedonia ===
Head coach: Vladimir Gligorov

No.	Pos.	Name	Date of birth (age)	Height	App.	Goals	Club
1	GK	Dijana Naumoska	5 January 1985 (aged 23)	1.71 m	5	0	(North Macedonia) RK Kale Kicevo
2	LP	Robertina Mečevska	16 November 1984 (aged 24)	1.71 m	25	15	(Turkey) Maliye Milli Piyango SK
3	LB	Natasa Kocevska	7 April 1984 (aged 24)	1.79 m	20	21	(Germany) TSV Bayer 04 Leverkusen
6	RB	Elena Gjorgjievska	27 March 1990 (aged 18)	1.77 m	23	16	(North Macedonia) Kometal Gjorče Petrov Skopje
7	CB	Dragica Kresoja	13 August 1986 (aged 22)	1.75 m	4	12	(North Macedonia) Kometal Gjorče Petrov Skopje
8	LW	Valentina Radulovic	10 March 1975 (aged 33)	1.70 m	227	812	(North Macedonia) ZRK Ambalaza Kabran
9	LP	Nataša Mladenovska	12 February 1986 (aged 22)	1.73 m	12	13	(North Macedonia) Kometal Gjorče Petrov Skopje
10	LP	Lence Ilkova	4 October 1984 (aged 24)	1.83 m	8	2	(North Macedonia) Kometal Gjorče Petrov Skopje
11	LB	Olga Bujanova	21 August 1976 (aged 32)	1.80 m	25	80	(Russia) Dinamo Volgograd
12	GK	Veselinka Trenoska	9 July 1985 (aged 23)	1.72 m	15	0	(North Macedonia) Kometal Gjorče Petrov Skopje
13	RW	Natalija Todorovska	7 July 1974 (aged 34)	1.73 m	30	168	(Croatia) HC Podravka Vegeta
14	CB	Julija Portjanko	20 April 1983 (aged 25)	1.76 m	28	97	(North Macedonia) Kometal Gjorče Petrov Skopje
15	CB	Biljana Crvenkoska	6 September 1983 (aged 25)	1.69 m	46	42	(Turkey) Üsküdar Bld. SK
16	GK	Tanja Andrejeva	17 June 1978 (aged 30)	1.75 m	68	0	(Serbia) ZRK Kikinda
17	LW	Dragana Pecevska	11 April 1983 (aged 25)	1.70 m	36	52	(North Macedonia) Kometal Gjorče Petrov Skopje
20	LB	Mirjeta Bajramoska	22 November 1984 (aged 24)	1.79 m	27	39	(North Macedonia) Kometal Gjorče Petrov Skopje
27		Daniela Noveska	14 August 1983 (aged 25)	1.75 m	21	19	(Germany) Thüringer HC

=== Serbia ===
Head coach: Časlav Dinčić

No.	Pos.	Name	Date of birth (age)	Height	App.	Goals	Club
1	GK	Zlata Paplacko	17 April 1969 (aged 39)	1.75 m	51	0	(Serbia) ORK Vrnjačka Banja
3	RW	Katarina Krpež	2 May 1988 (aged 20)	1.70 m	0	0	(Serbia) ORK Vrnjačka Banja
4	RW	Jelena Popović	4 September 1984 (aged 24)	1.71 m	60	84	(North Macedonia) Kometal Gjorče Petrov Skopje
7	CB	Andrea Lekić	6 September 1987 (aged 21)	1.78 m	38	81	(Slovenia) RK Krim Mercator
8	RB	Dijana Števin	23 October 1986 (aged 22)	1.81 m	26	31	(Serbia) ŽRK Kikinda
9	RB	Marina Dmitrović	23 March 1985 (aged 23)	1.82 m	15	32	(Serbia) ŽRK Radnički Belgrade
11	LB	Sanja Damnjanović	25 May 1987 (aged 21)	1.77 m	24	18	(Slovenia) RK Krim Mercator
12	GK	Slađana Đerić	17 February 1977 (aged 31)	1.78 m	59	0	(Hungary) Alcoa FKC
14	LP	Biljana Balać	19 November 1971 (aged 37)	1.73 m	56	75	(Serbia) ŽRK Dinamo Pančevo
15	LB	Jelena Erić	12 October 1979 (aged 29)	1.80 m	60	192	(Denmark) KIF Vejen Kolding
16	GK	Katarina Tomašević	6 February 1984 (aged 24)	1.79 m	27	0	(Denmark) Team Esbjerg
17	LP	Sanja Rajović	18 May 1981 (aged 27)	1.75 m	22	24	(Serbia) ŽRK Kikinda
21	LW	Svetlana Ognjenović	26 January 1981 (aged 27)	1.67 m	69	162	(France) Metz Handball
23	LP	Dragana Cvijić	15 March 1990 (aged 18)	1.85 m	5	5	(Serbia) RK Crvena zvezda
25	LW	Aleksandra Đorđević	15 May 1985 (aged 23)	1.72 m	5	4	(Serbia) ŽRK Kikinda
31	LB	Tatjana Medved	13 March 1974 (aged 34)	1.87 m	149	289	(Denmark) SK Århus
