= Matea Churlinovska =

Macedonian handballer (born 2005)

Personal information
- Nationality: Macedonian
- Born: 6 December 2005 (age 20) Prilep, Macedonia
- Height: 1.73 m (5 ft 8 in)

Sport
- Sport: Handball
- Position: Goalkeeper
- Current club: WHC Gjorche Petrov
- Number: 20
National team
Years	Team	Apps	(Gls)
2021	North Macedonia	3	(0)

Matea Čurlinovska (Macedonian: Матеа Чурлиновска; born 6 December 2005) is a Macedonian female handballer for ŽRK Kumanovo and the North Macedonia national team.

She represented the North Macedonia at the 2022 European Women's Handball Championship.
