= Jovetić =

Jovetić (Montenegrin: Јоветић) is a surname. Notable people with the surname include:

- Dijana Jovetić (born 1984), Croatian handball player
- Stevan Jovetić (born 1989), Montenegrin footballer
