= Emilijana Rizoska =

Macedonian handballer (born 2005)

Personal information
- Nationality: North Macedonia
- Born: 21 May 2005 (age 21) Bitola, Macedonia
- Height: 1.62 m (5 ft 4 in)

Sport
- Sport: Handball
- Position: Centre back
- Current club: WHC Gjorche Petrov
- Number: 32

Senior clubs
- Years: Team
- 2022-: WHC Gjorche Petrov
National team
Years	Team	Apps	(Gls)
2022–	North Macedonia	6	(6)

Emilijana Rizoska (born 21 May 2005) is a Macedonian female handballer for WHC Gjorche Petrov and the North Macedonia national team.

She represented the North Macedonia at the 2022 European Women's Handball Championship.
