= Zornitza Koleva =

Spanish handball player (born 1979)

Medal record

Representing Spain

Women's handball

European Championship
Silver medal – second place	2008 Macedonia	Team

Zornitza Koleva Simeonova (born 4 August 1979) is a Spanish handball player, playing for the club Vícar Goya and on the Spanish women's national team.

Born in Bulgaria to Czech refugees, she played on the Spanish team at the 2008 European Women's Handball Championship, where the Spanish team reached the final, after defeating Germany in the semifinal.
