= Tatiana Garmendia =

Spanish handball player (born 1974)

Personal information
- Full name: Tatiana Garmendia López
- Nationality: Spanish
- Born: 16 February 1974 (age 52) San Sebastián, Spain
- Height: 170 cm (67 in)

Sport
- Sport: Handball
- Position: Centre Back

Senior clubs
- Years: Team
- 1990–1998: BM Bidebieta
- 1998–2010: BM Bera Bera
National team
Years	Team	Apps	(Gls)
1996-2008	Spain	104	(213)
Medal record
Women's handball
Representing Spain
Mediterranean Games
Silver medal – second place	2001 Tunis	Team
European Championship
Silver medal – second place	2008 Macedonia	Team

Tatiana "Tati" Garmendia López (born 16 February 1974) is a former Spanish handball player. She played for the club Akaba Bera Bera, and on the Spanish national team.

She played on the Spanish team at the 2008 European Women's Handball Championship, where Spain reached the final, after defeating Germany in the semifinal.

Following her retirement, she became a coach at Bera Bera.
