= Indira Kastratović =

Macedonian handball player

Personal information
- Full name: Indira Kastratović
- Nationality: (North Macedonia) Macedonian
- Born: 2 October 1970 (age 56) Banja Luka, SR Bosnia and Herzegovina, SFR Yugoslavia

Sport
- Sport: Handball
- Position: Right Back
- Current club: (North Macedonia) ŽRK Vardar (coach)

Senior clubs
- Years: Team
- 1988:1990: ŽRK Halas Jožef
- 1990-1992: Jugoinspekt Novi Sad
- 1992-1994: ŽRK Voždovac
- 1994-2006: Kometal Gjorče Petrov
National team
- Years: Team
- –: (North Macedonia) Macedonia
- Updated on 17 February 2013

Indira Kastratović, née Jakupović (Macedonian: Индира Кастратовиќ; born 2 October 1970) is a Macedonian former handball player. She is considered as one of the best Macedonian female handball players in history and one of the best right backs in the world. She was inducted into the EHF Hall of Fame in 2024.

In the 1997 World Women's Handball Championship she helped the Macedonian women's handball team to reach 7th place by scoring 71 goals the most at that years championship. She played for Kometal Gjorče Petrov Skopje almost her entire career and was one of their best players. She reached the final at two occasions and won the champions league with Kometal Gjorče Petrov Skopje in 2002 scoring 10 goals in the final game.

In 2006 she went to BM Remudas, at Gran Canaria. But there were some problems with visas for her family and she decided to return home after three months.

She's married to the handball coach Zoran Kastratović. She is of Bosnian origin.

== Achievements ==
As player

- Kometal Gjorce Petrov
  - Macedonian League: 12
    - Winner: 1995, 1996, 1997, 1998, 1999, 2000, 2001, 2002, 2003, 2004, 2005 and 2006
  - Macedonian Cup: 12
    - Winner: 1995, 1996, 1997, 1998, 1999, 2000, 2001, 2002, 2003, 2004, 2005, 2006
  - Champions League: 1
    - Winner: 2002
    - Finalist: 2000 and 2005
  - Champions Trophy: 1
    - Winner: 2002
    - Semi-Finalist: 2004

As coach

- ZRK Vardar
  - Macedonian League: 3
    - Winner: 2013, 2014, 2015
  - Macedonian Cup: 3
    - Winner: 2013, 2014, 2015
