= Tanja Andrejeva =

Macedonian handball player

Personal information
- Full name: Tanja Andrejeva
- Nationality: Macedonian
- Born: 17 June 1978 (age 48) Skopje, Republic of Macedonia
- Height: 1.75 m (5 ft 9 in)

Sport
- Sport: Handball
- Position: Goalkeeper
- Current club: ŽRK Metalurg
- Number: 16
National team
Years	Team	Apps	(Gls)
–	(North Macedonia) Macedonia	97	(2)
- Updated on 6 June 2012

Tanja Andrejeva (Macedonian: Тања Андрејева) (born 17 June 1978 in Skopje, Republic of Macedonia) is a retired Macedonian handball goalkeeper that played for ŽRK Metalurg and for the Macedonia women's national handball team.

== Career ==
Tanja started her handball career at age of 14 in the youth team of Gjorce Petrov. At age of 19, in the season 1997/98 she became a member of Kometal Gjorče Petrov Skopje team roster. Later she left Kometal Gjorče Petrov Skopje and she played for some Macedonian handball clubs, like RK Tutunski Kombinat from Prilep and for RK Kale Kicevo from Kicevo. In the season 2007/08 she came back in Kometal Gjorče Petrov Skopje and she won the double crown. In 2008, she signed a deal with Serbian handball club ŽRK Kikinda. After one year playing in ŽRK Kikinda she left the club and signed a deal with the Macedonian club ŽRK Metalurg. With ŽRK Metalurg she won the Macedonian Championship and Macedonian Cup three times in a row.

She has 97 appearances for the Macedonian national team and she has scored 2 goals.
