= Tihana Ambroš =

Croatian handball player (born 1980)

Tihana Ambroš (born 7 June 1980 in Vinkovci, Croatia) is a Croatian former handball player who was a member of Croatia women's national handball team playing on pivot position.

Since 1999 Ambroš represented Croatia on World Women's Handball Championships and European Women's Handball Championships - last time on 2008 European Women's Handball Championship where Croatia won 6th place.

Ambroš' best results in EHF Women's Champions League are semi-finals (3rd place) in 2006 and quarter-finals (5th place) in 2009.

== Trophies ==
- Spanish Championship (2007)
- Spanish Supercup (2006, 2007)
- Croatian Championship (1999, 2000, 2001)
- Croatian Cup (1999, 2000, 2001)
- Montenegrin Championship (2009)
- Montenegrin Cup (2009)
- Bronze Medal on 2005 Mediterranean Games in Almeria...

== Former clubs ==
- Podravka Koprivnica
- Astroc Sagunto (BM Sagunto)
- Cementos La Union Ribarroja
- ŽRK Budućnost T-Mobile
