= Dijana Naumoska =

Macedonian handball player

Personal information
- Nationality: Macedonian
- Born: 5 January 1985 (age 41)
- Height: 1.73 m (5 ft 8 in)

Sport
- Sport: Handball
- Position: Goalkeeper
- Current club: Žito Prilep
- Number: 1
National team
Years	Team	Apps	(Gls)
–	Macedonia	22	(0)
- Updated on 4 December 2012

Dijana Naumoska (born 5 January 1985) is a retired Macedonian handball player that played for Žito Prilep and the Macedonian national team.
