= Maida Arslanagić =

Bosnian-Croatian handball player (born 1984)

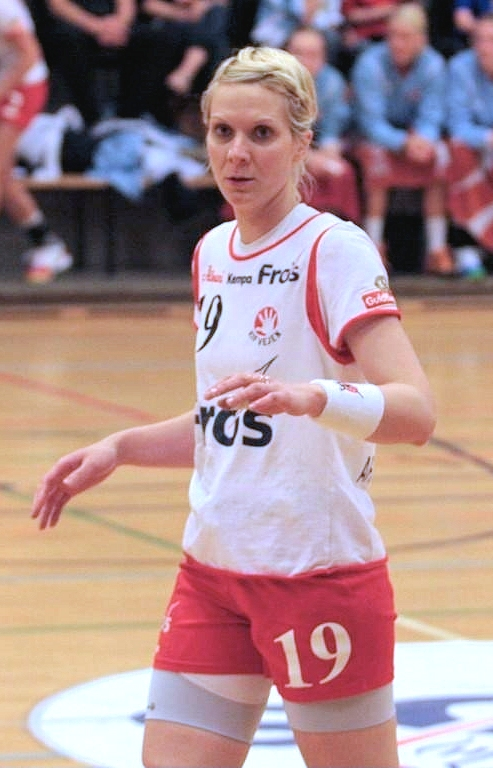

Personal information
- Nationality: Croatian
- Born: 20 April 1984 (age 42) Zagreb, SR Croatia, SFR Yugoslavia
- Height: 1.85 m (6 ft 1 in)

Sport
- Sport: Handball
- Position: Left back

Senior clubs
- Years: Team
- 1999–2007: Lokomotiva Zagreb
- 2007–2008: La Unión Ribarroja
- 2008–2012: KIF Vejen
- 2012–2014: Nice Handball
National team
- Years: Team
- –: Croatia

Maida Arslanagić (born 20 April 1984) is a retired Bosnian-Croatian handball player. She is the daughter of the famous former handball goalkeeper Abaz Arslanagić.

She played more than 100 games for the Croatia women's national handball team between 1999 and 2012, including the 2008 European Women's Handball Championship, where Croatia finished 6th.
