= Kristina Elez =

Croatian handball player (born 1987)

Personal information
- Nationality: Croatian
- Born: 22 May 1987 (age 39) Split, SR Croatia, SFR Yugoslavia
- Height: 1.75 m (5 ft 9 in)

Sport
- Sport: Handball
- Position: Right back
- Current club: Fleury Loiret HB
- Number: 41

Senior clubs
- Years: Team
- 2002–2009: RK Podravka Koprivnica
- 2009–2011: Metz Handball
- 2011–2012: RK Krim Ljubljana
- 2012–2013: Érdi VSE
- 2013–2014: Rostov-Don
- 2014–2015: RK Podravka Koprivnica
- 2015-2016: ZRK Split
- Jan. 2017-Jun 2017: ŽRK Zrinski Čakovec
- 2017-2018: Kastamonu Bld. GSK
- 2018-2020: Fleury Loiret HB
National team
Years	Team	Apps	(Gls)
–	Croatia	135	(414)

Kristina Elez (born 22 May 1987 as Kristina Franić) is a Croatian handball player and a member of the Croatian national team. She plays for the Turkish club Kastamonu Bld. GSK. She participated in the 2008 European Championship, where Croatia finished 6th. Franić was among the top-ten goal scorers of the tournament.

== Achievements ==
- Croatian First League:
  - Winner: 2003, 2005, 2006, 2007, 2008, 2009, 2015
- Croatian Cup:
  - Winner: 2003, 2004, 2006, 2008, 2009, 2015
- Championnat de France:
  - Winner: 2011
- Coupe de France:
  - Winner: 2010
- Coupe de la Ligue:
  - Winner: 2010, 2011
- Slovenian Championship:
  - Winner: 2012
- Slovenian Cup:
  - Winner: 2012
