= Tine Rustad Albertsen =

Norwegian handball player (born 1980)

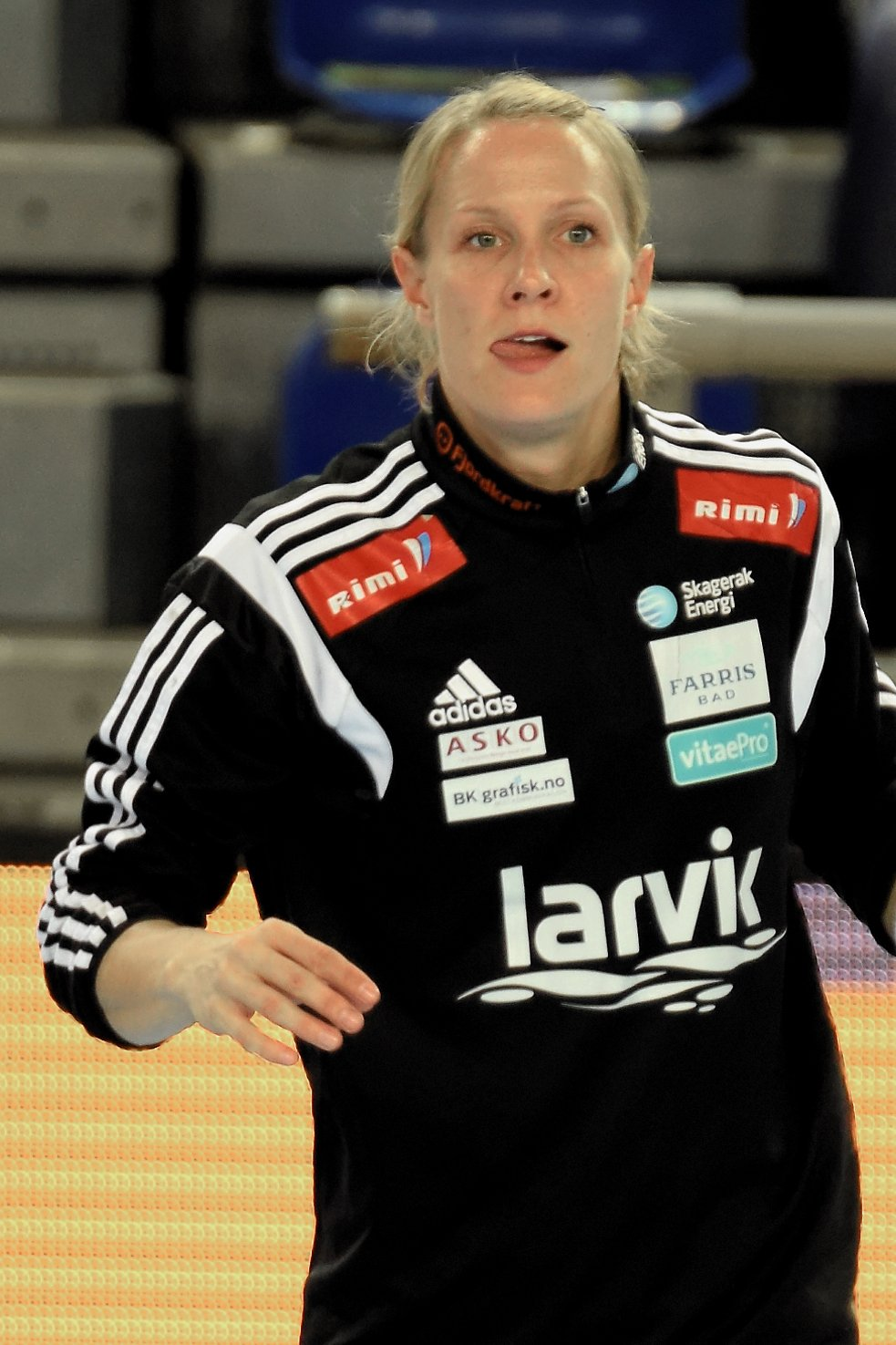
- Tine Rustad Albertsen (2014)

Personal information
- Nationality: Norwegian
- Born: 12 February 1980 (age 46) Norway
- Height: 1.77 m (5 ft 10 in)

Sport
- Sport: Handball
- Position: Center Back

Senior clubs
- Years: Team
- -2004: Fjellhammer IL
- 2004-2014: Larvik HK
National team
Years	Team	Apps	(Gls)
2005-2008	Norway	43	(52)
Medal record
European Championship
Gold medal – first place	2008 Macedonia	Team

Tine Rustad Albertsen (née Kristiansen, born 12 February 1980) is a Norwegian handball player, who previously played for Larvik HK.

She made her debut on the Norwegian national team in 2005, and played 43 matches and scored 52 goals. Former club is Fjellhammer IL (Norway). She won the Women's EHF Cup Winners' Cup with the club Larvik HK in 2004/2005, and in 2007/2008.

In 2008 she was of the Norwegian team that won 2008 European Championship.
