= 2008 European Women's Handball Championship =

2008 EHF European Women's Handball Championship
MACEDONIA 2008, 2/14 DECEMBER Европско првенство во ракомет за жени 2008

Tournament details
- Host country: Republic of Macedonia
- Venues: 2 (in 2 host cities)
- Dates: 2–14 December
- Teams: 16 (from 1 confederation)

Final positions
- Champions: Norway (4th title)
- Runners-up: Spain
- Third place: Russia
- Fourth place: Germany

Tournament statistics
- Matches played: 47
- Goals scored: 2,500 (53.19 per match)
- Attendance: 81,500 (1,734 per match)
- Top scorer: Linn-Kristin Riegelhuth (NOR) (51 goals)

Awards
- Best player: Kristine Lunde (NOR)

The 2008 EHF European Women's Handball Championship was held in the Republic of Macedonia from 2–14 December, it was won by Norway after beating Spain 34–21 in the final match.

== Venues ==
Two Macedonian cities have been selected as hosts for the 2008 Championship:

(North Macedonia) Skopje	(North Macedonia) Ohrid
Boris Trajkovski Sports Arena; Capacity: 10,000	Biljanini Izvori Sports Hall; Capacity: 5,000
2008 European Women's Handball Championship is located in North Macedonia

== Qualification ==
In total, 16 national teams qualified for the final tournament:

Host Country

1. Macedonia (3) :1998, 2000, 2006

Qualified from the 2006 European Championship

1. Norway (7) :1994, 1996, 1998, 2000, 2002, 2004, 2006 (Defending Champions)
2. Russia (7) :1994, 1996, 1998, 2000, 2002, 2004, 2006
3. France (4) :2000, 2002, 2004, 2006
4. Germany (7) :1994, 1996, 1998, 2000, 2002, 2004, 2006
5. Hungary (7) :1994, 1996, 1998, 2000, 2002, 2004, 2006

Qualified from play-offs

Team 1	Agg.	Team 2	1st leg	2nd leg
Slovakia	51–58	Ukraine	27–28	24–30
Italy	53–65	Austria	27–29	26–36
Spain	54–49	Lithuania	24–19	30–30
Poland	61–63	Portugal	37–28	24–35
Montenegro	63–66	Croatia	40–35	23–31
Iceland	46–70	Romania	23–37	23–33
Belarus	54–50	Slovenia	29–25	25–25
Sweden	54–44	Czech Republic	25–19	29–25
Turkey	44–45	Denmark	25–24	19–21
Netherlands	52–54	Serbia	24–23	28–31

== Squads ==
Each nation had to submit an initial squad of 28 players, 12 of them became reserves when the final squad of 16 players was announced on 1 December 2008.

== Seeding ==
The draw for the preliminary round groups took place on 20 July 2008, in Ohrid.

Pot 1	Pot 2	Pot 3	Pot 4
Norway; Russia; France; Germany	Hungary; Sweden; Croatia; Portugal	Spain; Austria; Denmark; Macedonia	Ukraine; Serbia; Belarus; Romania

== Format ==
- Preliminary Round: 16 teams are divided into four groups. They play each other in a single round robin system, so each team plays three matches. A win is worth two points, while a draw is worth one point. The top three teams from each group advance to the Main Round.
- Main Round: 12 teams are divided in two groups. They play against the teams they didn't play in the preliminary round, so each team plays 3 matches. All points from the preliminary round, except the points gained against the 4th place team in the preliminary group, are carried forward into the Main Round. Same round robin rules apply as in the preliminary round. Top 2 teams from each group advance to the semifinals, while the third placed team from each group advances to the 5th-6th Place Play-off.
- Final Round: 6 teams play in the final weekend of the championships. 3rd place teams from the Main Round play in the 5th-6th Place Play-off. Other teams play in the semifinals. Losers of the semifinals advance to the 3rd-4th Place Play-off, and winners advance to the Final.

== Preliminary round ==
All times are local (UTC+1).

=== Group A ===
Pos	Team	Pld	W	D	L	GF	GA	GD	Pts	Qualification
1	Romania	3	3	0	0	84	71	+13	6	Main round
2	Denmark	3	1	1	1	75	76	−1	3	Main round
3	Hungary	3	1	1	1	76	79	−3	3	Main round
4	France	3	0	0	3	74	83	−9	0	

Source: EHF

3 December; 18:15	Hungary	21–27	Romania	Boris Trajkovski Sports Arena, Skopje; Attendance: 1,000; Referees: Baranowski, Lemanowicz (POL)
3 December; 18:15	Görbicz 5	Report	Lecușanu, Manea, Neagu 5	Boris Trajkovski Sports Arena, Skopje; Attendance: 1,000; Referees: Baranowski, Lemanowicz (POL)

3 December; 20:15	France	23–24	Denmark	Boris Trajkovski Sports Arena, Skopje; Attendance: 800; Referees: Lindroos, Leandersson (FIN)
3 December; 20:15	Spincer 6	Report	Aaen 7	Boris Trajkovski Sports Arena, Skopje; Attendance: 800; Referees: Lindroos, Leandersson (FIN)

5 December; 18:15	Romania	30–25	France	Boris Trajkovski Sports Arena, Skopje; Attendance: 700; Referees: Brunovský, Čanda (SVK)
5 December; 18:15	Ardean-Elisei 8	Report	Dembélé, Limal 4	Boris Trajkovski Sports Arena, Skopje; Attendance: 700; Referees: Brunovský, Čanda (SVK)

5 December; 20:15	Denmark	26–26	Hungary	Boris Trajkovski Sports Arena, Skopje; Attendance: 1,000; Referees: Marić, Mašić (SRB)
5 December; 20:15	Skov 6	Report	Görbicz 10	Boris Trajkovski Sports Arena, Skopje; Attendance: 1,000; Referees: Marić, Mašić (SRB)

7 December; 18:15	France	26–29	Hungary	Boris Trajkovski Sports Arena, Skopje; Attendance: 600; Referees: Andersen, Sødal (NOR)
7 December; 18:15	Kamto N'jitam 7	Report	Görbicz 9	Boris Trajkovski Sports Arena, Skopje; Attendance: 600; Referees: Andersen, Sødal (NOR)

7 December; 20:15	Denmark	25–27	Romania	Boris Trajkovski Sports Arena, Skopje; Attendance: 1,000; Referees: Bol, van Eck (NED)
7 December; 20:15	Møller, Skov 5	Report	Lecușanu 9	Boris Trajkovski Sports Arena, Skopje; Attendance: 1,000; Referees: Bol, van Eck (NED)

=== Group B ===
Pos	Team	Pld	W	D	L	GF	GA	GD	Pts	Qualification
1	Norway	3	2	1	0	88	60	+28	5	Main round
2	Spain	3	1	2	0	74	69	+5	4	Main round
3	Ukraine	3	1	1	1	82	81	+1	3	Main round
4	Portugal	3	0	0	3	67	101	−34	0	

Source: EHF

3 December; 17:15	Portugal	24–38	Ukraine	Biljanini Izvori Sports Hall, Ohrid; Attendance: 500; Referees: Nikolovski, Kolevski (MKD)
3 December; 17:15	Barbosa 9	Report	Nikolayenko 9	Biljanini Izvori Sports Hall, Ohrid; Attendance: 500; Referees: Nikolovski, Kolevski (MKD)

3 December; 19:15	Norway	21–21	Spain	Biljanini Izvori Sports Hall, Ohrid; Attendance: 1,000; Referees: Marić, Mašić (SRB)
3 December; 19:15	Riegelhuth 5	Report	Mangué 6	Biljanini Izvori Sports Hall, Ohrid; Attendance: 1,000; Referees: Marić, Mašić (SRB)

5 December; 17:15	Spain	29–24	Portugal	Biljanini Izvori Sports Hall, Ohrid; Attendance: 500; Referees: Leifsson, Pálsson (ISL)
5 December; 17:15	Pinedo, Mangué 7	Report	Barbosa 11	Biljanini Izvori Sports Hall, Ohrid; Attendance: 500; Referees: Leifsson, Pálsson (ISL)

5 December; 19:15	Ukraine	20–33	Norway	Biljanini Izvori Sports Hall, Ohrid; Attendance: 1,000; Referees: Bol, van Eck (NED)
5 December; 19:15	Pidpalova, Nikolayenko 5	Report	Larsen 7	Biljanini Izvori Sports Hall, Ohrid; Attendance: 1,000; Referees: Bol, van Eck (NED)

7 December; 17:15	Spain	24–24	Ukraine	Biljanini Izvori Sports Hall, Ohrid; Attendance: 1,000; Referees: Brunovský, Čanda (SVK)
7 December; 17:15	Beatriz 7	Report	Shymkute 8	Biljanini Izvori Sports Hall, Ohrid; Attendance: 1,000; Referees: Brunovský, Čanda (SVK)

7 December; 19:15	Norway	34–19	Portugal	Biljanini Izvori Sports Hall, Ohrid; Attendance: 1,200; Referees: Lindroos, Leandersson (FIN)
7 December; 19:15	Riegelhuth 9	Report	Barbosa 6	Biljanini Izvori Sports Hall, Ohrid; Attendance: 1,200; Referees: Lindroos, Leandersson (FIN)

=== Group C ===
Pos	Team	Pld	W	D	L	GF	GA	GD	Pts	Qualification
1	Russia	3	2	1	0	79	66	+13	5	Main round
2	Sweden	3	1	2	0	64	50	+14	4	Main round
3	Belarus	3	1	1	1	77	71	+6	3	Main round
4	Austria	3	0	0	3	53	86	−33	0	

Source: EHF

2 December; 18:15	Sweden	21–21	Belarus	Biljanini Izvori Sports Hall, Ohrid; Attendance: 1,000; Referees: Bol, van Eck (NED)
2 December; 18:15	Ahlm, Utković 4	(13–7)	Kurchankova 6	Biljanini Izvori Sports Hall, Ohrid; Attendance: 1,000; Referees: Bol, van Eck (NED)
2 December; 18:15		Report		Biljanini Izvori Sports Hall, Ohrid; Attendance: 1,000; Referees: Bol, van Eck (NED)

2 December; 20:15	Russia	31–22	Austria	Biljanini Izvori Sports Hall, Ohrid; Attendance: 1,000; Referees: Leifsson, Pálsson (ISL)
2 December; 20:15	three players 5	(13–10)	Engel 8	Biljanini Izvori Sports Hall, Ohrid; Attendance: 1,000; Referees: Leifsson, Pálsson (ISL)
2 December; 20:15	3× (yellow card) 2× (suspension)	Report	4× (yellow card) 2× (suspension)	Biljanini Izvori Sports Hall, Ohrid; Attendance: 1,000; Referees: Leifsson, Pálsson (ISL)

4 December; 18:15	Austria	10–24	Sweden	Biljanini Izvori Sports Hall, Ohrid; Attendance: 500; Referees: Rakytina, Tkachuk (UKR)
4 December; 18:15	Engel 4	(5–11)	Ahlm 5	Biljanini Izvori Sports Hall, Ohrid; Attendance: 500; Referees: Rakytina, Tkachuk (UKR)
4 December; 18:15		Report		Biljanini Izvori Sports Hall, Ohrid; Attendance: 500; Referees: Rakytina, Tkachuk (UKR)

4 December; 20:15	Belarus	25–29	Russia	Biljanini Izvori Sports Hall, Ohrid; Attendance: 700; Referees: Baranowski, Lemanowicz (POL)
4 December; 20:15	Mahilina 5	(12–18)	three players 4	Biljanini Izvori Sports Hall, Ohrid; Attendance: 700; Referees: Baranowski, Lemanowicz (POL)
4 December; 20:15	3× (yellow card) 5× (suspension) 1× (red card)	Report	3× (yellow card) 4× (suspension)	Biljanini Izvori Sports Hall, Ohrid; Attendance: 700; Referees: Baranowski, Lemanowicz (POL)

6 December; 18:15	Russia	19–19	Sweden	Biljanini Izvori Sports Hall, Ohrid; Attendance: 1,500; Referees: Dobrovits, Tájok (HUN)
6 December; 18:15	Polenova 4	(12–18)	Ahlm 6	Biljanini Izvori Sports Hall, Ohrid; Attendance: 1,500; Referees: Dobrovits, Tájok (HUN)
6 December; 18:15	4× (yellow card) 2× (suspension)	Report	2× (yellow card) 1× (suspension)	Biljanini Izvori Sports Hall, Ohrid; Attendance: 1,500; Referees: Dobrovits, Tájok (HUN)

6 December; 20:15	Austria	21–31	Belarus	Biljanini Izvori Sports Hall, Ohrid; Attendance: 800; Referees: Nikolovski, Kolevski (MKD)
6 December; 20:15	Aćimović 7	(12–14)	Mahilina 6	Biljanini Izvori Sports Hall, Ohrid; Attendance: 800; Referees: Nikolovski, Kolevski (MKD)
6 December; 20:15		Report		Biljanini Izvori Sports Hall, Ohrid; Attendance: 800; Referees: Nikolovski, Kolevski (MKD)

=== Group D ===
Pos	Team	Pld	W	D	L	GF	GA	GD	Pts	Qualification
1	Germany	3	3	0	0	89	80	+9	6	Main round
2	Macedonia (H)	3	2	0	1	84	84	0	4	Main round
3	Croatia	3	1	0	2	86	89	−3	2	Main round
4	Serbia	3	0	0	3	87	93	−6	0	

Source: EHF
(H) Hosts

2 December; 17:45	Croatia	30–26	Serbia	Boris Trajkovski Sports Arena, Skopje; Attendance: 2,000; Referees: Andersen, Sødal (NOR)
2 December; 17:45	Golubić, Penezić 7	Report	Lekić 9	Boris Trajkovski Sports Arena, Skopje; Attendance: 2,000; Referees: Andersen, Sødal (NOR)

2 December; 20:15	Germany	25–22	Macedonia	Boris Trajkovski Sports Arena, Skopje; Attendance: 4,500; Referees: Brunovský, Čanda (SVK)
2 December; 20:15	Krause 11	Report	Portjanko 8	Boris Trajkovski Sports Arena, Skopje; Attendance: 4,500; Referees: Brunovský, Čanda (SVK)

4 December; 18:15	Serbia	31–32	Germany	Boris Trajkovski Sports Arena, Skopje; Attendance: 3,500; Referees: Lindroos, Leandersson (FIN)
4 December; 18:15	Lekić 8	Report	Jurack 8	Boris Trajkovski Sports Arena, Skopje; Attendance: 3,500; Referees: Lindroos, Leandersson (FIN)

4 December; 20:15	Macedonia	31–29	Croatia	Boris Trajkovski Sports Arena, Skopje; Attendance: 6,000; Referees: Dobrovits, Tájok (HUN)
4 December; 20:15	Kresoja, Portjanko 8	Report	Franić 7	Boris Trajkovski Sports Arena, Skopje; Attendance: 6,000; Referees: Dobrovits, Tájok (HUN)

6 December; 18:15	Germany	32–27	Croatia	Boris Trajkovski Sports Arena, Skopje; Attendance: 1,000; Referees: Rakytina, Tkachuk (UKR)
6 December; 18:15	Walzik 10	Report	Arslanagić 8	Boris Trajkovski Sports Arena, Skopje; Attendance: 1,000; Referees: Rakytina, Tkachuk (UKR)

6 December; 20:15	Macedonia	31–30	Serbia	Boris Trajkovski Sports Arena, Skopje; Attendance: 6,000; Referees: Baranowski, Lemanowicz (POL)
6 December; 20:15	Todorovska 8	Report	Lekić 7	Boris Trajkovski Sports Arena, Skopje; Attendance: 6,000; Referees: Baranowski, Lemanowicz (POL)

== Main round ==
=== Group I ===
Pos	Team	Pld	W	D	L	GF	GA	GD	Pts	Qualification
1	Norway	5	4	1	0	156	111	+45	9	Semifinals
2	Spain	5	2	2	1	117	110	+7	6 (Note: Romania 18–26 Spain)	Semifinals
3	Romania	5	3	0	2	143	141	+2	6	Fifth place game
4	Hungary	5	1	1	3	114	134	−20	3 (Note: Hungary 3 Pts, Ukraine 2 Pts, Denmark 1 Pt)	
5	Ukraine	5	1	1	3	130	148	−18	3	
6	Denmark	5	1	1	3	121	137	−16	3	

Source: EHF
Notes:

9 December; 16:15	Hungary	26–24	Ukraine	Biljanini Izvori Sports Hall, Ohrid; Attendance: 700; Referees: Nikolovski, Kolevski (MKD)
9 December; 16:15	Görbicz 10	Report	Shymkute 11	Biljanini Izvori Sports Hall, Ohrid; Attendance: 700; Referees: Nikolovski, Kolevski (MKD)

9 December; 18:15	Romania	18–26	Spain	Biljanini Izvori Sports Hall, Ohrid; Attendance: 1,100; Referees: Lindroos, Leandersson (FIN)
9 December; 18:15	Ardean-Elisei 7	Report	Aguilar 6	Biljanini Izvori Sports Hall, Ohrid; Attendance: 1,100; Referees: Lindroos, Leandersson (FIN)

9 December; 20:15	Denmark	19–31	Norway	Biljanini Izvori Sports Hall, Ohrid; Attendance: 1,500; Referees: Marić, Mašić (SRB)
9 December; 20:15	Troelsen 5	Report	Riegelhuth 9	Biljanini Izvori Sports Hall, Ohrid; Attendance: 1,500; Referees: Marić, Mašić (SRB)

10 December; 16:15	Romania	40–32	Ukraine	Biljanini Izvori Sports Hall, Ohrid; Attendance: 700; Referees: Baranowski, Lemanowicz (POL)
10 December; 16:15	Lecușanu 10	Report	Pidpalova 11	Biljanini Izvori Sports Hall, Ohrid; Attendance: 700; Referees: Baranowski, Lemanowicz (POL)

10 December; 18:15	Hungary	20–34	Norway	Biljanini Izvori Sports Hall, Ohrid; Attendance: 1,000; Referees: Lindroos, Leandersson (FIN)
10 December; 18:15	Bulath, Sopronyi 4	Report	Lunde 7	Biljanini Izvori Sports Hall, Ohrid; Attendance: 1,000; Referees: Lindroos, Leandersson (FIN)

10 December; 20:15	Denmark	26–23	Spain	Biljanini Izvori Sports Hall, Ohrid; Attendance: 700; Referees: Nikolovski, Kolevski (MKD)
10 December; 20:15	Aaen 8	Report	Mangué 10	Biljanini Izvori Sports Hall, Ohrid; Attendance: 700; Referees: Nikolovski, Kolevski (MKD)

11 December; 16:15	Hungary	21–23	Spain	Biljanini Izvori Sports Hall, Ohrid; Attendance: 1,100; Referees: Brunovský, Čanda (SVK)
11 December; 16:15	Görbicz, Vérten 4	Report	Mangué 7	Biljanini Izvori Sports Hall, Ohrid; Attendance: 1,100; Referees: Brunovský, Čanda (SVK)

11 December; 18:15	Denmark	25–30	Ukraine	Biljanini Izvori Sports Hall, Ohrid; Attendance: 1,200; Referees: Marić, Mašić (SRB)
11 December; 18:15	Skov 6	Report	Managarova, Sheyenko 6	Biljanini Izvori Sports Hall, Ohrid; Attendance: 1,200; Referees: Marić, Mašić (SRB)

11 December; 20:15	Romania	31–37	Norway	Biljanini Izvori Sports Hall, Ohrid; Attendance: 1,500; Referees: Baranowski, Lemanowicz (POL)
11 December; 20:15	Neagu 7	Report	Riegelhuth 7	Biljanini Izvori Sports Hall, Ohrid; Attendance: 1,500; Referees: Baranowski, Lemanowicz (POL)

=== Group II ===
Pos	Team	Pld	W	D	L	GF	GA	GD	Pts	Qualification
1	Germany	5	4	1	0	145	121	+24	9	Semifinals
2	Russia	5	3	1	1	137	116	+21	7	Semifinals
3	Croatia	5	2	0	3	149	146	+3	4 (Note: Croatia 2 Pts, +3 GD; Macedonia 2 Pts, +1 GD; Sweden 2 Pts, –4 GD)	Fifth place game
4	Macedonia (H)	5	2	0	3	129	145	−16	4	
5	Sweden	5	1	2	2	110	125	−15	4	
6	Belarus	5	0	2	3	133	150	−17	2	

Source: EHF
(H) Hosts
Notes:

8 December; 16:15	Belarus	35–43	Croatia	Boris Trajkovski Sports Arena, Skopje; Attendance: 600; Referees: Rakytina, Tkachuk (UKR)
8 December; 16:15	Platanovich 9	Report	Golubić 12	Boris Trajkovski Sports Arena, Skopje; Attendance: 600; Referees: Rakytina, Tkachuk (UKR)

8 December; 18:15	Sweden	22–33	Germany	Boris Trajkovski Sports Arena, Skopje; Attendance: 2,000; Referees: Dobrovits, Tájok (HUN)
8 December; 18:15	Boson 6	Report	Jurack 10	Boris Trajkovski Sports Arena, Skopje; Attendance: 2,000; Referees: Dobrovits, Tájok (HUN)

8 December; 20:15	Russia	43–24	Macedonia	Boris Trajkovski Sports Arena, Skopje; Attendance: 6,000; Referees: Andersen, Sødal (NOR)
8 December; 20:15	Levina 7	(15–12)	Todorovska 5	Boris Trajkovski Sports Arena, Skopje; Attendance: 6,000; Referees: Andersen, Sødal (NOR)
8 December; 20:15	2× (yellow card) 4× (suspension)	Report	4× (yellow card) 3× (suspension)	Boris Trajkovski Sports Arena, Skopje; Attendance: 6,000; Referees: Andersen, Sødal (NOR)

10 December; 16:15	Russia	24–21	Croatia	Boris Trajkovski Sports Arena, Skopje; Attendance: 500; Referees: Leifsson, Pálsson (ISL)
10 December; 16:15	Khmyrova 5	(11–10)	Franić 8	Boris Trajkovski Sports Arena, Skopje; Attendance: 500; Referees: Leifsson, Pálsson (ISL)
10 December; 16:15	3× (yellow card) 3× (suspension) 1× (red card)	Report	3× (yellow card)	Boris Trajkovski Sports Arena, Skopje; Attendance: 500; Referees: Leifsson, Pálsson (ISL)

10 December; 18:15	Sweden	24–23	Macedonia	Boris Trajkovski Sports Arena, Skopje; Attendance: 6,000; Referees: Brunovský, Čanda (SVK)
10 December; 18:15	Ahlm 8	Report	Todorovska 10	Boris Trajkovski Sports Arena, Skopje; Attendance: 6,000; Referees: Brunovský, Čanda (SVK)

10 December; 20:15	Belarus	28–28	Germany	Boris Trajkovski Sports Arena, Skopje; Attendance: 200; Referees: Bol, van Eck (NED)
10 December; 20:15	Kurchankova 8	Report	Neukamp 6	Boris Trajkovski Sports Arena, Skopje; Attendance: 200; Referees: Bol, van Eck (NED)

11 December; 16:15	Sweden	24–29	Croatia	Boris Trajkovski Sports Arena, Skopje; Attendance: 300; Referees: Bol, van Eck (NED)
11 December; 16:15	Flognman 4	Report	Arslanagić 7	Boris Trajkovski Sports Arena, Skopje; Attendance: 300; Referees: Bol, van Eck (NED)

11 December; 18:15	Russia	22–27	Germany	Boris Trajkovski Sports Arena, Skopje; Attendance: 1,000; Referees: Leifsson, Pálsson (ISL)
11 December; 18:15	Khmyrova, Turey 6	(12–14)	Jurack, Loerper 7	Boris Trajkovski Sports Arena, Skopje; Attendance: 1,000; Referees: Leifsson, Pálsson (ISL)
11 December; 18:15	2× (yellow card) 2× (suspension)	Report	2× (yellow card) 2× (suspension)	Boris Trajkovski Sports Arena, Skopje; Attendance: 1,000; Referees: Leifsson, Pálsson (ISL)

11 December; 20:15	Belarus	24–29	Macedonia	Boris Trajkovski Sports Arena, Skopje; Attendance: 6,000; Referees: Dobrovits, Tájok (HUN)
11 December; 20:15	Artsiukhovich 5	Report	Todorovska 7	Boris Trajkovski Sports Arena, Skopje; Attendance: 6,000; Referees: Dobrovits, Tájok (HUN)

== Final round ==
=== Bracket ===
Semifinals
13 December
Norway	24
Russia	18
13 December
Spain	32
Germany	29

Final
14 December
Norway	34
Spain	21
Third place
14 December
Russia	24
Germany	21

=== Fifth place game ===
13 December
11:30
Romania
36–33 (ET)
Croatia
Boris Trajkovski Sports Arena, Skopje
Attendance: 500
Referees: Leifsson, Pálsson (ISL)
Amariei 7
(17–15)
Arslanagić, Horvat 7
2× (yellow card) 3× (suspension)
Report
3× (yellow card) 1× (suspension)

FT: 29–29 ET: 7–4

=== Semifinals ===
13 December; 14:00	Spain	32–29	Germany	Boris Trajkovski Sports Arena, Skopje; Attendance: 1,000; Referees: Andersen, Sødal (NOR)
13 December; 14:00	Garmendia 8	(12–13)	Jurack 9	Boris Trajkovski Sports Arena, Skopje; Attendance: 1,000; Referees: Andersen, Sødal (NOR)
13 December; 14:00	3× (yellow card) 4× (suspension)	Report	3× (yellow card) 1× (suspension)	Boris Trajkovski Sports Arena, Skopje; Attendance: 1,000; Referees: Andersen, Sødal (NOR)

13 December; 16:30	Norway	24–18	Russia	Boris Trajkovski Sports Arena, Skopje; Attendance: 1,800; Referees: Brunovský, Čanda (SVK)
13 December; 16:30	Riegelhuth 5	(12–7)	Poltoratskaya, Turey 4	Boris Trajkovski Sports Arena, Skopje; Attendance: 1,800; Referees: Brunovský, Čanda (SVK)
13 December; 16:30	3× (yellow card) 3× (suspension)	Report	3× (yellow card) 3× (suspension)	Boris Trajkovski Sports Arena, Skopje; Attendance: 1,800; Referees: Brunovský, Čanda (SVK)

=== Third place game ===
14 December; 14:00	Russia	24–21	Germany	Boris Trajkovski Sports Arena, Skopje; Attendance: 2,300; Referees: Dobrovits, Tájok (HUN)
14 December; 14:00	Poltoratskaya 8	(17–11)	Melbeck 6	Boris Trajkovski Sports Arena, Skopje; Attendance: 2,300; Referees: Dobrovits, Tájok (HUN)
14 December; 14:00	4× (yellow card) 2× (suspension)	Report	2× (yellow card) 1× (suspension)	Boris Trajkovski Sports Arena, Skopje; Attendance: 2,300; Referees: Dobrovits, Tájok (HUN)

=== Final ===
14 December; 16:30	Norway	34–21	Spain	Boris Trajkovski Sports Arena, Skopje; Attendance: 5,000; Referees: Rakytina, Tkachuk (UKR)
14 December; 16:30	Nøstvold 7	(13–12)	Fernández, Mangué 4	Boris Trajkovski Sports Arena, Skopje; Attendance: 5,000; Referees: Rakytina, Tkachuk (UKR)
14 December; 16:30	3× (yellow card) 2× (suspension)	Report	4× (yellow card) 4× (suspension)	Boris Trajkovski Sports Arena, Skopje; Attendance: 5,000; Referees: Rakytina, Tkachuk (UKR)

== Ranking and statistics ==
=== Final ranking ===
Gold medal	Norway
Silver medal	Spain
Bronze medal	Russia
4	Germany
5	Romania
6	Croatia
7	Macedonia
8	Hungary
9	Sweden
10	Ukraine
11	Denmark
12	Belarus
13	Serbia
14	France
15	Austria
16	Portugal

Source: EuroHandball.com

2008 Women's European Champions

Norway
4th title

Team roster

Ragnhild Aamodt, Isabel Blanco, Karoline Dyhre Breivang, Marit Malm Frafjord, Kari Aalvik Grimsbø, Katrine Lunde Haraldsen, Camilla Herrem, Kari Mette Johansen, Tine Kristiansen, Tonje Larsen, Heidi Løke, Kristine Lunde, Tonje Nøstvold, Terese Pedersen, Linn-Kristin Riegelhuth and Linn Jørum Sulland. Head coach: Marit Breivik.

=== All-Star Team ===
- Goalkeeper: Katrine Lunde Haraldsen (NOR)
- Left wing: Valentina Ardean-Elisei (ROU)
- Left back: Tonje Larsen (NOR)
- Pivot: Begoña Fernández (ESP)
- Centre back: Kristine Lunde (NOR)
- Right back: Grit Jurack (GER)
- Right wing: Linn-Kristin Riegelhuth (NOR)
- Best defence player: Nadezhda Muravyova (RUS)
- Most valuable player: Kristine Lunde (NOR)

Chosen by team officials and EHF experts: EHF-Euro.com

=== Top goalscorers ===
Rank	Name	Team	Goals	Shots	%
1	Linn-Kristin Riegelhuth	Norway	51	77	66%
2	Grit Jurack	Germany	46	88	52%
3	Marta Mangué	Spain	43	84	51%
4	Anita Görbicz	Hungary	39	79	49%
5	Natalija Todorovska	Macedonia	38	55	69%
6	Andrea Penezić	Croatia	37	69	54%
6	Valentina Ardean-Elisei	Romania	37	60	62%
8	Dijana Golubić	Croatia	33	53	62%
8	Julija Portjanko	Macedonia	33	71	46%
10	Kristina Franić	Croatia	32	50	64%

Source: EHF

=== Top goalkeepers ===
(minimum 20% of total shots received by team)

Rank	Name	Team	%	Saves	Shots
1	Katrine Lunde Haraldsen	Norway	47	88	187
2	Clara Woltering	Germany	44	79	178
3	Madeleine Grundström	Sweden	43	74	172
3	Anna Sedoykina	Russia	43	72	166
5	Inna Suslina	Russia	41	62	151
6	Amandine Leynaud	France	38	41	109
7	Luminiţa Dinu	Romania	37	98	265
8	Jelena Grubišić	Croatia	36	68	189
8	Iryna Honcharova	Ukraine	36	42	117
8	Terese Pedersen	Norway	36	29	80

Source: EHF-Euro.com
