= WHC Gjorche Petrov =

- Full name: Ženski rakometen klub Gjorče Petrov
- Founded: 1979
- Arena: Kocho Racin
- Capacity: 1,000
- Head coach: Sime Simovski
- League: Skopsko Super League; WHRL
- Club colours
Home	Away

WHC Gjorche Petrov (Macedonian: Ракометен Клуб Ѓорче Петров, romanized: Rakometen Klub Gjorče Petrov) is a female handball club based in Skopje, the capital of North Macedonia.

== History ==
The club was founded in 1979 under the name Women's Handball Club Gjorče Petrov. Kometal Gjorče Petrov stopped its work on 16 September 2011 when the central committee decided that there was no conditions for operation and existence. After a while the club started to work again.It was shut for couple of years but it started working again, without its brand-mark Kometal. Now it works under its original name WHC Gjorche and competes in Macedonian women's First League of Handball.

- Kometal Days

For a decade the team played in the Macedonian National league, starting from lower ranks step by step year by year reaching the top division. In the beginning of the 90s local Businessmen Trifun Kostovski took over the club. He invested good amount of money on bringing new players. After making the good team he moved the club to bigger arena "Kale". He invested in renovation of the arena expending and preparing it for the European scene . Year after year each season better and better players joined the club. The team started winning the Championship and the since next year 1994 they dominated in the cup too. Since 1992, it had won 17 national championships 16 national cups.

- European Champions League

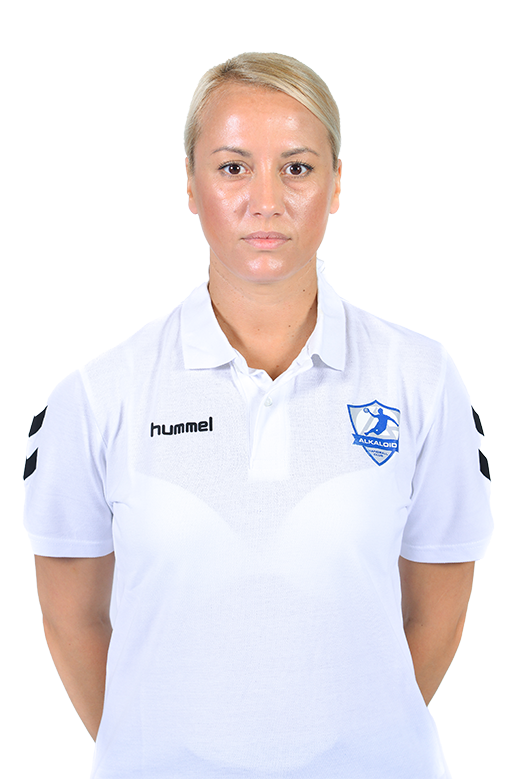
Bile Crvenkoska Centar Back of Kometal glory team Final 2002

Kometal played in the EHF Women's Champions League for 14 seasons in a row. Each new season was better than the previous. Reaching the 1/4 finals almost every season and many times the 1/2 finals. They were finalists in 2000 and 2005, and won the Champions Trophy once in 2002. At one time, it was the most popular sports team in the country, having its own anthem song by Macedonian musicians and entertainers. The club finally won the EHF Champions League back in 2002 when they defeated Champions League Ferencvárosi TC.

- Post Kometal days

The club had to start again from the lower ranks of the national championship. For several seasons they played in the lower rank, and then moved to the higher divisions. Finally getting back where they belong in the First Division. Last few seasons they started ending in the top 5 five. In the last season they are in the play-offs fighting for the Crown again. This season they've reached the Cup's F4 winning the 1/2 final. After winning the semifinals they had to face WHC Metalurg in the final and try to win a Trophy after 13 years. They've lost the final match to Metalurg 27–30 in a tight game.

- Champions 2022 Gold

After a loss at the Cup Final to Metalurg, the Gjorche Petrov team focused on the final games of the Championship play-off. They won against former champions Kumanovo away in a surprise win with a score of 22–27. In the last match Gjorche Petrov won 25-19 against cup holder Metalurg at home. The title was the team's first in 13 years.

- Champions 2023 Gold

In 2023 Gjorche Petrov defended the title in the women's league.

- Double Crown 2024 Gold

In 2024 the Gjorche Petrov team won the Cup and the Championship for a golden double. It's the club's 20th Championship title and 17th Cup title.

- Another Double Crown in 2025 Gold

In 2025 the Gjorche Petrov team won the Cup and the Championship once again for a golden double. It's the club's 21st Championship title and 18th Cup title.

== European Glory Days Arena ==
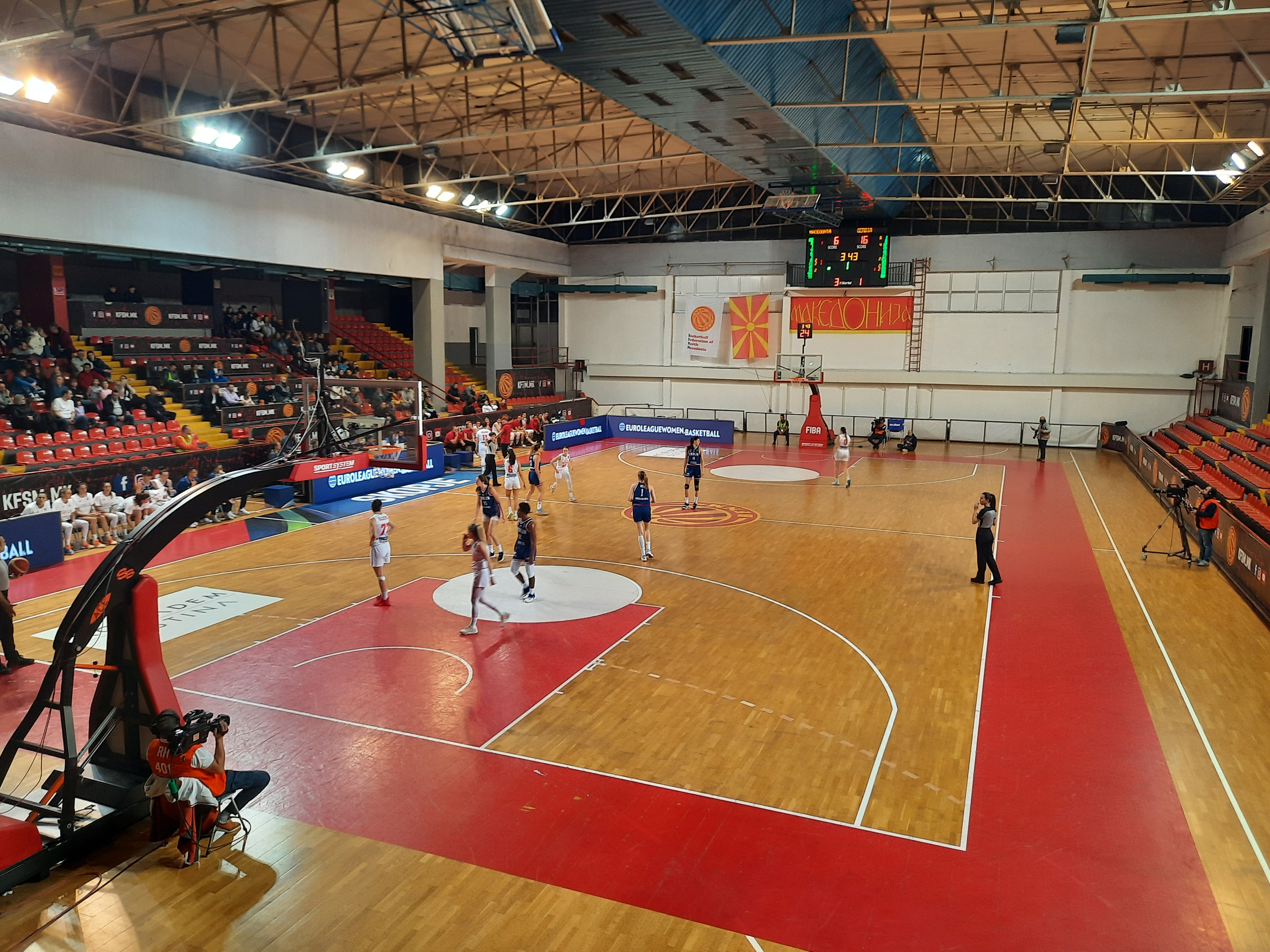
Arena Kale

SRC Kale -Sports and Recreation Center is a multi-functional indoor sports arena. Kale means Fortress Citadel, named after the Skopje's Fortress, located right next to the hall. The capacity of the hall is 4.300 spectators. Hall is also known as "Macedonian handball fortress". The hall is mainly used for handball, although it is suitable for matches in others sports: boxing, wrestling, basketball, volleyball, and music concerts.

- Kometal G.P Important matches played in SRC Kale

Finals in the Women's EHF Champions League – Kometal Gjorce Petrov (2000 – Hypo, 2002 – Herz, 2005 – Slagelse)
Women Handball Super Cup - 2002

== Accomplishments ==
- Macedonian
- Championship of Macedonia:

Gold (21): 1993, 1994, 1995, 1996, 1997, 1998, 1999, 2000, 2001, 2002, 2003, 2004, 2005, 2006, 2007, 2008, 2009, 2022, 2023, 2024, 2025

- Macedonian Cup:

Gold (19): 1993, 1995, 1996, 1997, 1998, 1999, 2000, 2001, 2002, 2003, 2004, 2005, 2006, 2007, 2008, 2009, 2024, 2025, 2026

- European
- Champions League:

Gold (1): 2002
Silver (2): 2000 and 2005
1/4 Finalist (4): 1997, 1998, 2004, 2006
1/8 Finalist (5): 1994, 1996, 2007, 2008, 2009

- Women's EHF European Cup:

1/4 Finalist (1): 2024

- Champions Trophy:

Gold (1): 2002
Bronze (1) : 2004

== Team ==
Squad for the 2023–24 season

WHC Gjorche Petrov

Goal Keepers

- 12 (North Macedonia) Jovana Trajkoska
- 16 (North Macedonia) Slobodanka Kiceska
- 46 (North Macedonia) Matea Churlinovska

Right wingers

- (Brazil) Luana Forte
- 14 (North Macedonia) Eva Bozhinovska

Left Wingers

- 10 (North Macedonia) Emilijana Rizoska
- 19 (North Macedonia) Jana Gorkovska
- 77 (North Macedonia) Anastasija Nikolovska

Line players

- 55 (North Macedonia) Iva Velkova
- 93 (North Macedonia) Katerina Damjanovska
- (Brazil) Liena Menezes

Left Backs

- 15 (North Macedonia) Marija Jankulovska
- 27 (North Macedonia) Angela Jankulovska
- 97 (North Macedonia) Milica Nikolik

Central Backs

- 11 (North Macedonia) Mila Gjorgijevska
- 26 (North Macedonia) Ana Marija Kolarovska

Right Back

- (Brazil) Talita Almeida
- 17 (North Macedonia) Angela Kostovikj

=== Technical staff ===
- (North Macedonia) Head Coach: Sime Simevski

== Notable players ==
- (North Macedonia) Mirjeta Bajramoska
- (North Macedonia) Dušica Gjorgjievska
- (North Macedonia) Elena Gjorgjievska
- (North Macedonia) Lenche Ilkova
- (Serbia) (North Macedonia) Dragica Kresoja
- (North Macedonia) Nataša Mladenovska
- (North Macedonia) Savica Mrkikj
- (North Macedonia) Simona Nikolovska
- (North Macedonia) Alegra Oholanga
- (North Macedonia) Dragana Pecevska
- (Ukraine) (North Macedonia) Julija Portjanko-Nikolić
- (North Macedonia) Marija Shterjova
- (North Macedonia) Iva Stojkovska
- (North Macedonia) Veselinka Trenoska
- (North Macedonia) Klara Boeva
- (Bosnia and Herzegovina) (North Macedonia) Indira Kastratović-Jakupović
- (North Macedonia) Gordana Naceva
- (Serbia) (North Macedonia) Andrijana Budimir
- (Russia) (North Macedonia) Olga Buyanova
- (Russia) (North Macedonia) Natalija Todorovska
- (North Macedonia) Anzela Platon
- (North Macedonia) Mileva Velkova
- (North Macedonia) Valentina Radulović
- (Russia) (North Macedonia) Marina Lambevska
- (Brazil) Eduarda Amorim
- (Brazil) Ana Carolina Amorim
- (Romania) Luminița Dinu
- (Romania) Narcisa Lecușanu
- (Turkey) Yeliz Özel
- (Turkey) Gonca Nahcıvanlı
- (Croatia) Natasa Kolega
- (Croatia) Ana Krizanac
- (Croatia) Sandra Bosnjak
- (Serbia) Tatjana Medved
- (Serbia) Dragica Djuric Krstic
- (Serbia) Danica Pavlov
- (Serbia) Ivana Mladenovic
- (Serbia) Jelena Popovic
- (Ukraine) (Slovenia) Natalia Derepasko
- (Russia) Oksana Maslova
- (Russia) (North Macedonia) Larisa Kiselyova
- (Russia) Tatiana Chernycheva
- (Russia) Irina Kalinichenko
- (Russia) Anna Andryushchenko
- (Ukraine) Oksana Ploshchynska
- (Ukraine) Galyna Markushevska
- (Ukraine) Olena Radchenko
- (Ukraine) Olena Tsygytsa
- (Ukraine) Natalia Lukovich
- (Ukraine) Oxana Raykhel
- (Belarus) Tatiana Khlimankova
- (Belarus) Iryna Artisomenka
- (Belarus) Alesya Safonova
- (Bulgaria) Dessislava Lebedeva
