= Begoña Fernández =

Spanish handball player (born 1980)

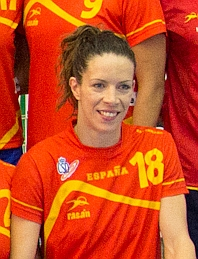

Personal information
- Full name: Begoña Fernández Molinos
- Nationality: Spanish
- Born: 22 March 1980 (age 46) Vigo, Spain
- Height: 1.80 m (5 ft 11 in)

Sport
- Sport: Handball
- Position: Pivot

Senior clubs
- Years: Team
- 1998–2000: Milar L'Eliana
- 2001–2003: CBM Astroc Sagunto
- 2003–2005: SD Itxako
- 2005–2008: BM Elda Prestigio
- 2008–2012: SD Itxako
- 2012: ŽRK Zaječar
- 2013–2015: ŽRK Vardar
National team
Years	Team	Apps	(Gls)
2004–2013	Spain	181	(395)
Medal record
Olympic Games
Bronze medal – third place	2012 London	Team
European Championship
Silver medal – second place	2008 Macedonia	Team

Begoña Fernández Molinos (born 22 March 1980 in Vigo) is a former Spanish team handball player. She was member of the Spanish national team.

She played at the 2008 European Women's Handball Championship in the Republic of Macedonia, where the Spanish team defeated Germany in the semifinal, and received silver medals after losing the final. She was selected into the all-star-team and named the best pivot of the tournament. A year later she was part of the Spanish team that finished 4th at the 2009 World Women's Handball Championship.

She was part of the Spanish team that won the bronze medal at the 2012 Summer Olympics.

She was included in the European Handball Federation Hall of Fame in 2023.
