= Beatriz Fernández =

Spanish handball player (born 1985)

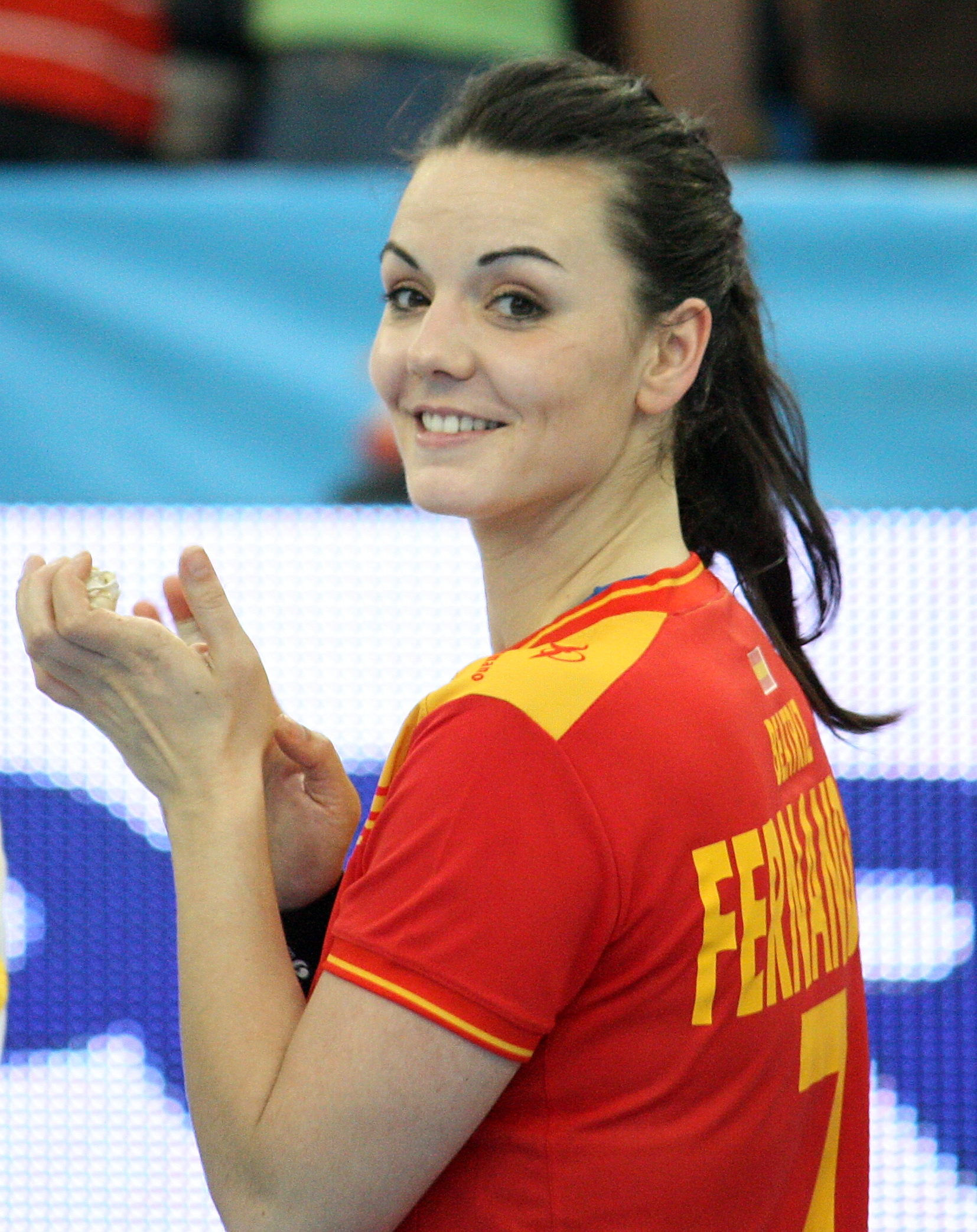

Personal information
- Full name: Beatriz Fernández Ibáñez
- Nationality: Spanish
- Born: 19 March 1985 (age 41) Santander, Cantabria
- Height: 1.80 m (5 ft 11 in)

Sport
- Sport: Handball
- Position: Centre back

Senior clubs
- Years: Team
- 2005-2006: CP Goya Almería
- 2006-2008: BM Sagunto
- 2008-2010: CB Mar Alicante
- 2010-2012: BM Bera Bera
- 2012-2015: Fleury Loiret HB
- 2015-2016: BM Bera Bera
National team
Years	Team	Apps	(Gls)
2005-2016	Spain	182	(380)
Medal record
Olympic Games
Bronze medal – third place	2012 London	Team
European Championship
Silver medal – second place	2008 Macedonia	Team
Silver medal – second place	2014 Croatia/Hungary	Team

Beatriz Fernández Ibáñez (born 19 March 1985) is a former Spanish handball player who was member of the Spanish national team.

Fernández played on the Spanish team at the 2008 European Women's Handball Championship, where Spain reached the final, after defeating Germany in the semifinal. She was also part of the team that won silver at the 2014 European Women's Handball Championship. She was also part of the 2012 Olympic team that won the bronze medal.
