= Ivana Petković =

Croatian handball player (born 1985)

Personal information
- Nationality: Croatian
- Born: 6 June 1985 (age 41) Metković, SR Croatia, SFR Yugoslavia
- Height: 1.77 m (5 ft 10 in)

Sport
- Sport: Handball
- Position: Right back
- Current club: RK Zelina
- Number: 27
National team
Years	Team	Apps	(Gls)
–	Croatia	50	(62)
- Updated on 4 December 2012

Ivana Petković (born 6 June 1985) is a Croatian team handball player. She plays on the Croatian national team, and participated at the 2011 World Women's Handball Championship in Brazil.
