= Natalija Todorovska =

Russian and Macedonian handball player

Personal information
- Full name: Natalija Todorovska (née Malakhova)
- Nationality: Russian / Macedonian
- Born: July 7, 1974 (age 52) Kotovo, Russian SFSR, Soviet Union
- Height: 175 cm (69 in)

Sport
- Sport: Handball
- Position: Right wing
- Current club: Retired

Senior clubs
- Years: Team
- –2001: Volgograd Akva
- 2001–2006: Kometal Gjorče Petrov Skopje
- 2006–2009: Podravka Vegeta
- 2009–?: ŽRK Zaječar
National team
- Years: Team
- –: Russia
- –: North Macedonia

Natalija Todorovska, née Natalia Malakhova (born 7 July 1974) is a Russian and then Macedonian handball player.

== Career ==
After playing many years for the Volgograd Akva, she went to the Macedonian Champions club Kometal Gjorče Petrov Skopje in 2001. In her first season at the club she won the Champions League.

Awarded as the best right wing of the 1997 World Championship with Russia, she lately played for the Macedonian team. At the 2005 World Championship, she scored 21 goals against Cameroon and at the 2008 European Women's Handball Championship she finished the fifth top goalscorer.

On 24 March 2009, Natalija Todorovska was awarded the Medal for Service to the Country by the president of the Republic of Macedonia for acknowledgement of her sport achievements and her contribution to developing and popularizing sport in Macedonia as well as promoting the country abroad.
