= Nataša Mladenovska =

Macedonian handball player

Personal information
- Full name: Nataša Mladenovska
- Nationality: Macedonian
- Born: 12 February 1986 (age 40) Kumanovo, SR Macedonia
- Height: 1.78 m (5 ft 10 in)

Sport
- Sport: Handball
- Position: Pivot
- Current club: (North Macedonia) ŽRK Metalurg
- Number: 20
National team
Years	Team	Apps	(Gls)
–	(North Macedonia) Macedonia	53	(95)
- Updated on 4 December 2012

Nataša Mladenovska (Macedonian: Наташа Младеновска) (born 12 February 1986 in Kumanovo, Socialist Republic of Macedonia) is a retired Macedonian handball player that played for ŽRK Metalurg and for the North Macedonia women's national handball team.

She plays on the position line player-pivot.

In the season 2010/11, playing for ŽRK Metalurg, she made it to the Last 16 of the Women's EHF Cup Winners' Cup.
