= Kristine Lunde-Borgersen =

Norwegian handball player (born 1980)

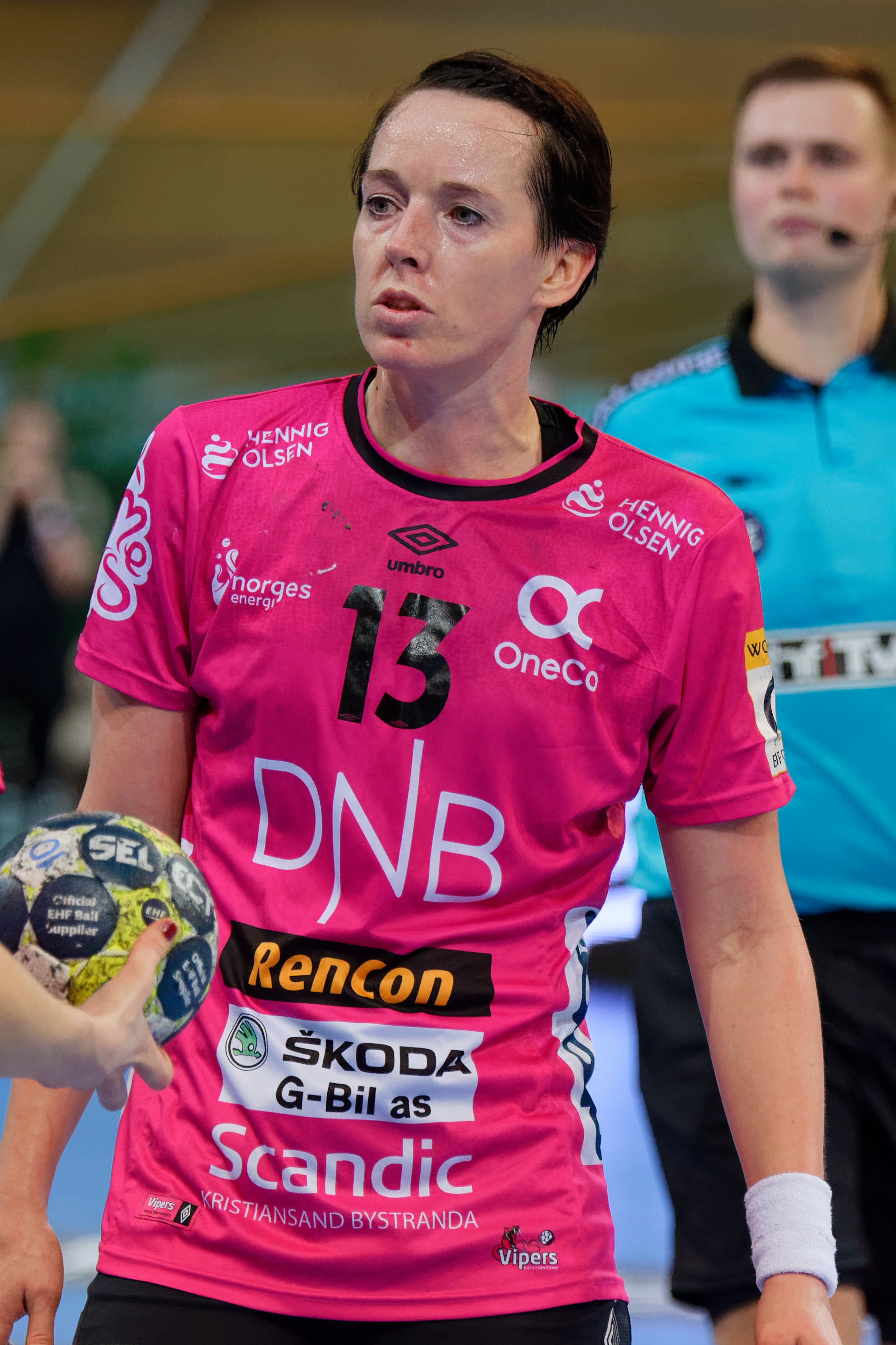
- Lunde-Borgersen on February 3, 2018

Personal information
- Nationality: Norwegian
- Born: 30 March 1980 (age 46) Kristiansand, Norway
- Height: 1.83 m (6 ft 0 in)

Sport
- Sport: Handball
- Position: Centre back

Senior clubs
- Years: Team
- –2004: Våg Vipers
- 2004–2007: Aalborg DH
- 2007–2010: Viborg HK
- 2010–2015: IK Våg
- 2017–2018: Vipers Kristiansand
National team
Years	Team	Apps	(Gls)
2001–2013	Norway	181	(496)
Medal record
Women's handball
Representing Norway
Olympic Games
Gold medal – first place	2008 Beijing	Team
Gold medal – first place	2012 London	Team
World Championship
Gold medal – first place	2011 Brazil	Team
Silver medal – second place	2001 Italy	Team
Bronze medal – third place	2009 China	Team
European Championship
Gold medal – first place	2004 Hungary	Team
Gold medal – first place	2006 Sweden	Team
Gold medal – first place	2008 Macedonia	Team
Silver medal – second place	2012 Serbia	Team

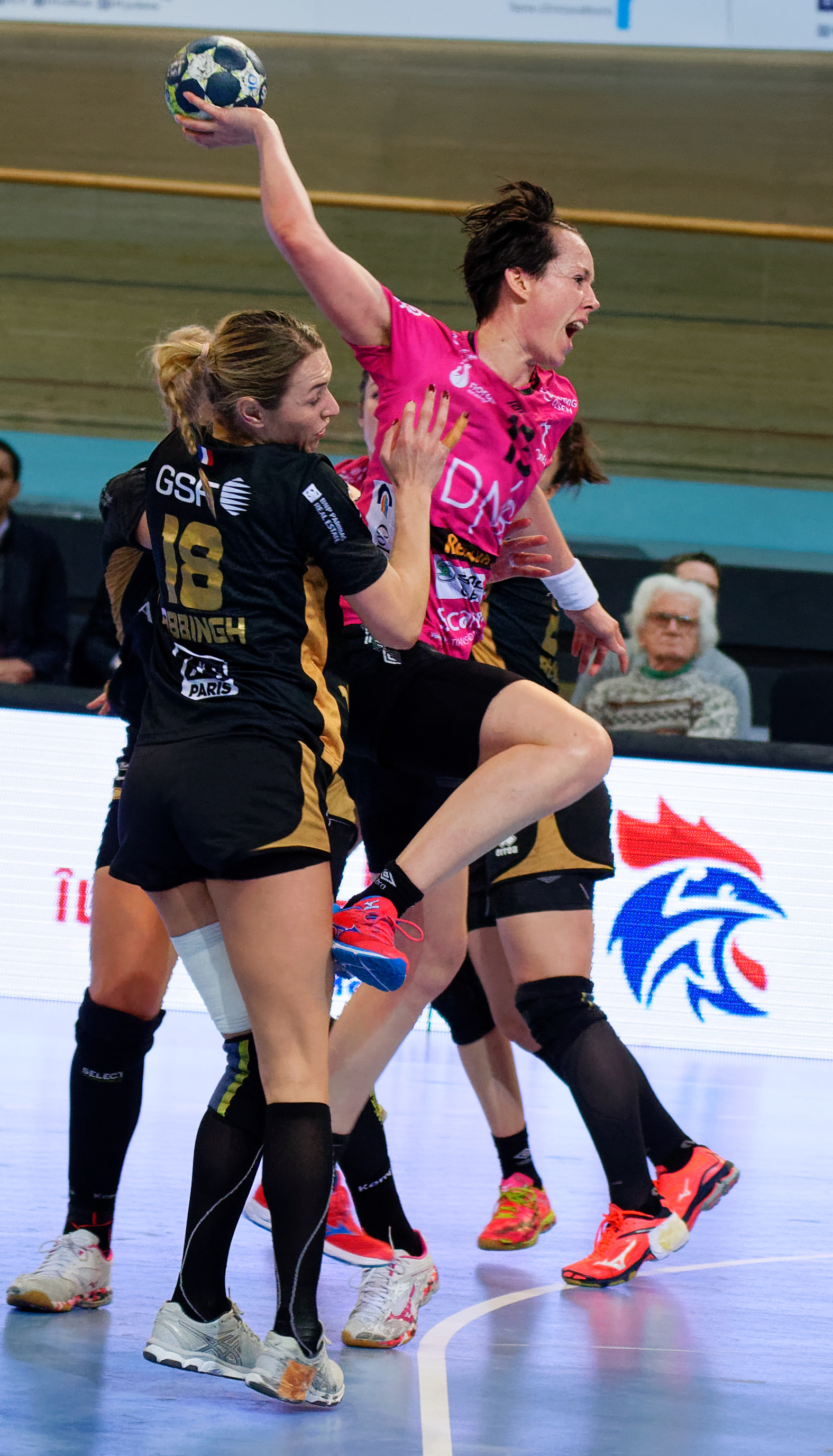
Feb. 3, 2018

Kristine Lunde-Borgersen (born 30 March 1980) is a retired Norwegian handballer who played for the Norwegian national team. She is Olympic champion, World Champion and three times European champion. She is the twin sister of fellow handball player Katrine Lunde. On 13 June 2017, she announced her return to playing handball for the 2017–2018 season, to replace Marta Tomac, who is out of play following a severe injury.

She was awarded the Håndballstatuetten trophy from the Norwegian Handball Federation in 2021.

== Club career ==
Lunde Borgersen started her handball career in Norwegian clubs Hånes, Kristiansand and Våg Vipers.

In 2004, she moved to Denmark and played for Aalborg DH for 3 seasons. In 2007, she signed a 3-year contract with Viborg where she played together with her twin sister, Katrine Lunde Haraldsen. With Viborg, she won Danish Championship gold in 2008, 2009 and 2010, and the Danish Cup in 2007 and 2008. She won the Champions League in 2009 and 2010. After the 2014–2015 season, she retired to become an assistant coach in her now re-branded hometown club Vipers Kristiansand. On 13 June 2017, she announced her return to playing (while remaining an assistant coach) for the 2017–2018 season, following the severe knee injury suffered by the teams playmaker Marta Tomac.

== National team ==
Lunde Borgersen made her debut on the Norwegian national team in 2001, with Marit Breivik as coach. Her first major competition was the 2001 World Championship in Italy, where she won a silver medal. She did not participate in the 2002 European Championship and even though she was back in the team for Croatia 2003, her first gold medal came in 2004, when Norway won the European Championship. She was European Champion again in 2006.

Due to a shoulder injury, she missed the 2007 World Championship in France. Fully recovered, Lunde Borgersen came back for the 2008 Summer Olympics in Beijing, where Norway won a gold medal. At the end of the year, the absence of Gro Hammerseng forced Breivik to select a new captain for the 2008 European Championship. Lunde Borgersen was chosen for the task, and as captain of the Norwegian team, she led them to their third consecutive European gold. Her performance was recognized when she was selected Playmaker of the All-Star Team and Most Valuable Player of the championship.

As of 2013, Lunde Borgersen has played 181 international matches and scored 496 goals. At the 2009 World Championships, she was part of the team that came third, beating Spain in the bronze medal match. She then won gold with Norway at the 2011 World Championships.

At the 2012 Summer Olympics, she was again part of the Norwegian team that won gold.

== Personal life ==
On 3 July 2009, she married Ole M. Borgersen in Viborg domkirke in Denmark.

== Results ==
=== National team ===
- European Championship
  - Gold: 2004, 2006 and 2008
  - Silver: 2012
- World Championship
  - Gold: 2011
  - Silver: 2001
  - Bronze: 2009
- Summer Olympics
  - Gold: 2008, 2012

=== Club ===
- EHF Women's Champions League

Winner: 2009 and 2010 (Viborg HK)
Semifinal: 2005/06 (Aalborg DH)

- EHF Cup:
  - Finalist: 2018
- Norwegian Championship

Gold: 2017/18 (Vipers)
Bronze: 2002/03 (Våg Vipers)

- Norwegian Women's Handball Cup

Winner: 2017 (Vipers)

- Danish Championship

Gold: 2008, 2009 and 2010 (Viborg HK)
Silver: 2005 (Aalborg DH)
Bronze: 2006 and 2007 (Aalborg DH)

- Danish Women's Handball Cup

Winner: 2007 and 2008 (Viborg HK)

== Awards ==
- Player of the year (Norwegian: Årets spiller) and Playmaker of the year 2004 in the Norwegian League
- Playmaker of the All-Star Team and MVP at the 2008 European championship
