= Julija Portjanko =

Macedonian handball player (1983–2021)

Julija Portjanko (North Macedonia)
Personal information
- Nationality: Macedonian
- Born: 20 April 1983 Dnipropetrovsk, Ukrainian SSR, Soviet Union
- Died: 12 October 2021 (aged 38) Veles, North Macedonia
- Height: 1.76 m (5 ft 9 in)

Sport
- Sport: Handball
- Position: Centre back

Senior clubs
- Years: Team
- 2001–2003: SC Galiceanka Liov
- 2003–2009: Kometal Gjorče Petrov
- 2009–2010: Üsküdar Bld. SK
- 2010–2012: Arvor 29
- 2012–2013: Zvezda Zvenigorod
- 2013–2015: ŽRK Vardar
National team
Years	Team	Apps	(Gls)
–	Macedonia	57	(187)
- Updated on 4 December 2012

Julija Portjanko (Macedonian: Јулија Портјанко; born Yuliya Ihorivna Portyanko, Ukrainian: Юлія Ігорівна Портянко; 20 April 1983 – 12 October 2021), also known as Julija Nikolić (Macedonian: Јулија Николиќ; Ukrainian: Юлія Ігорівна Ніколич, romanized: Yuliya Ihorivna Nikolich), was a Macedonian handball player. She last played for the club ŽRK Vardar and for the Macedonia national team. She represented Macedonia at the 2008 European Women's Handball Championship, where Macedonia finished 7th, and Portjanko was among the top-ten goalscorers at the championship.

On 3 June 2012, after leading Macedonia to qualification for the 2012 European Women's Handball Championship, she announced her retirement from the national team.

== Accomplishments ==
WHC Gjorche Petrov

- Macedonian (North Macedonia)
- Macedonian First League:

Gold (6): 2004, 2005, 2006, 2007, 2008, 2009

- Macedonian Cup:

Gold (6):2004, 2005, 2006, 2007, 2008, 2009

Uskuder Istanbul

- Cup Winner :2010

Brest Bretagne Handball

- Champion :2012
- Cup Winner :2012

WHC Vardar

- Macedonian (North Macedonia)
- Macedonian First League:

Winner (2): 2013–14, 2014–15

- Macedonian Cup

Winner (2): 2014, 2015

- Women's Regional Handball League

Runner-up: 2013–14

- Bucharest Trophy:

Third placed: 2015

- Vardar Trophy:

Winners: 2015
