= Dragica Kresoja =

Macedonian handball player (born 1986)

Medal record

Women's handball

Representing Serbia and Montenegro

Mediterranean Games
Silver medal – second place	2005 Almería	Team

Dragica Kresoja (Macedonian: Драгица Кресоја; born 13 August 1986) is a Macedonian handball player. Kresoja is of Serbian origin and received Macedonian citizenship in 2007. Having previously played for the Serbia and Montenegro team at the 2005 Mediterranean Games, she played for the Macedonia women's national handball team at the 2007 World Women's Handball Championship in France, she made her debut for Macedonia in 2008, when her home country hosted the 2008 European Women's Handball Championship.
