= Narcisa Lecușanu =

Romanian handball player (born 1976)

Narcisa Georgeta Lecuşanu

Executive Member of International Handball Federation
- Incumbent
- Assumed office 11 November 2017 Serving with František Táborský (Czech Republic)
- President: Hassan Moustafa (Egypt)
- Vice President: Joël Delplanque (France)
- Preceded by: Joël Delplanque (France); František Táborský (Czech Republic)

Personal details
- Born: 14 September 1976 (age 50) Bacău, Socialist Republic of Romania
- Handball career
- Height: 1.85 m (6 ft 1 in)
- Sport: Handball
- Position: Left Back; Middle Back
- Current club: Retired

Senior clubs
- Years: Team
- 1993–1996: Știința Bacău
- 1996–1998: Kometal Skopje
- 1998–2000: Borussia Dortmund
- 2000–2002: TV Lützellinden
- 2002–2004: Ikast-Bording EH
- 2004–2006: Aalborg DH
- 2006–2010: Oltchim Râmnicu Vâlcea
National team
| Years | Team | Apps | (Gls) |
| 1996-2009 | Romania | 134 | (354) |
Medal record
Youth World Championship
| Gold medal – first place | 1995 Brazil | Team |
World Championship
| Silver medal – second place | 2005 Russia | Team |
- Updated on 12 June 2012

Narcisa Georgeta Lecuşanu (née Paunica; born 14 September 1976 in Bacău, Socialist Republic of Romania) is a retired Romanian handballer who played for the Romanian national team. She received a silver medal in the 2005 World Championship. She also participated in the 2008 Summer Olympics held at Beijing (China), where Romania placed seventh.

She was included in the European Handball Federation Hall of Fame in 2023.

== Achievements ==
=== Club ===
Kometal Skopje

- Macedonian League:

Champion: 1997, 1998

- Macedonian Cup:

Winner: 1997, 1998

Borussia Dortmund

- German League

Runner-up: 1999

- EHF Cup:

Semi-Finalist: 2000

TV Lützellinden

- German League:

Champion: 2001

Ikast-Bording EH

- Danish League:

Runner-up: 2003

- Danish Cup:

Finalist: 2003, 2004

- Cup Winners' Cup:

Winner: 2004

- Champions Trophy:

Semi-Finalist: 2003

- Champions League:

Semi-Finalist: 2003

Aalborg DH

- Champions League:

Semi-Finalist: 2006

Oltchim Râmnicu Vâlcea:

- Romanian League

Champion: 2007, 2008, 2009, 2010

- Romanian Cup:

Winner: 2007

- Romanian Supercup:

Winner: 2007

- Champions Trophy:

Winner: 2007

- Cup Winners' Cup:

Winner: 2007

- Champions League:

Runner-up: 2010
Semi-Finalist: 2009

=== National team ===
- Youth World Championship:

Gold Medallist: 1995

- World Championship:

Silver Medallist: 2005
Fourth place: 2007

== Selected publications ==
- Lecușanu, Narcisa; Gorczyca, Mariana (2021). My Life Story. Coresi Publishing House. ASIN B096LWKCV1.
