= Regina Kalinichenko =

Ukrainian-Russian former professional handballer (born 1985)

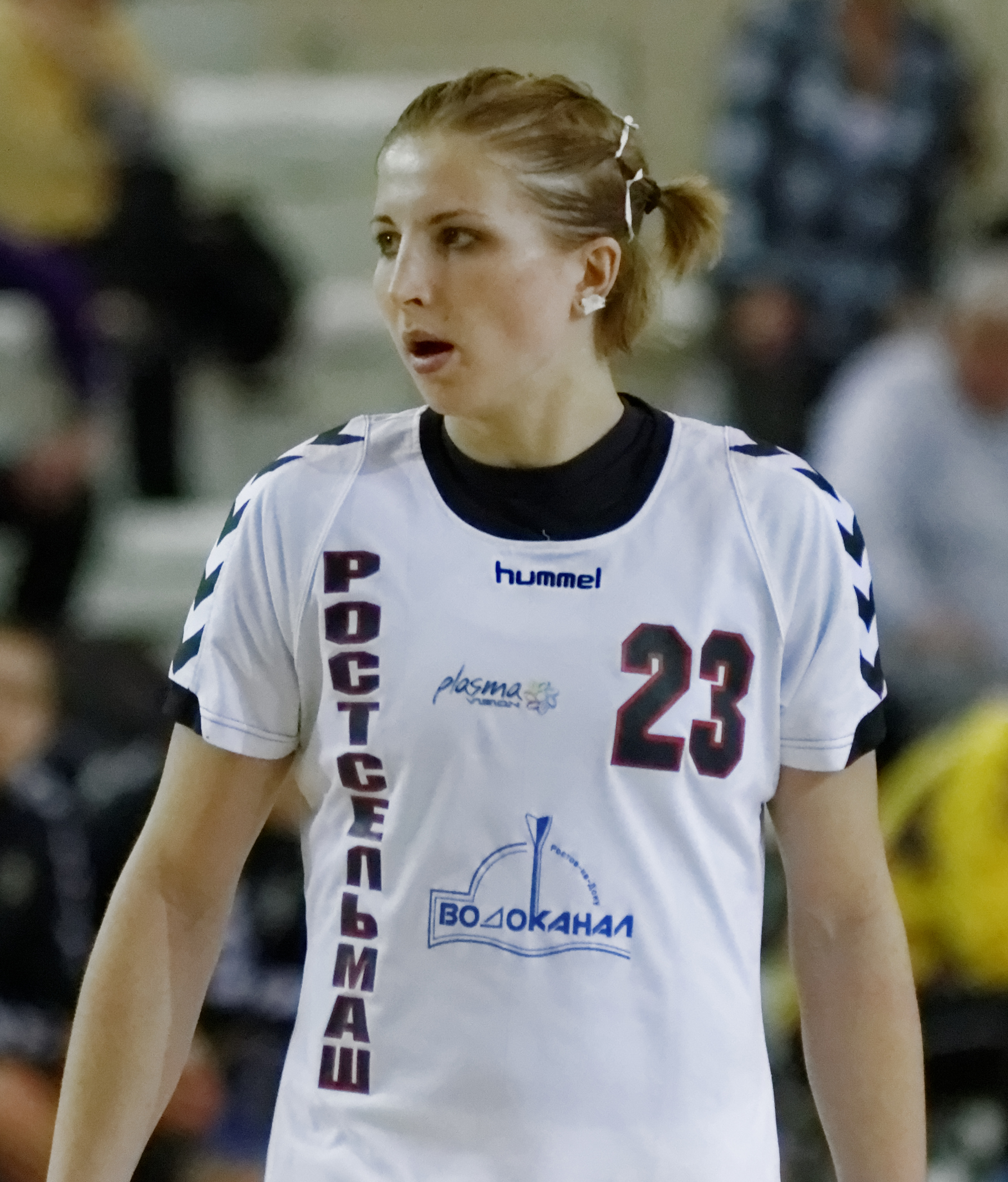

Personal information
- Full name: Regina Kalinichenko
- Nationality: Ukrainian (until 2012); Russian (2012-present)
- Born: 21 December 1985 (age 40) Kherson, Ukrainian SSR, Soviet Union
- Height: 1.79 m (5 ft 10 in)

Sport
- Sport: Handball
- Position: Left Back

Senior clubs
- Years: Team
- 2003–2008: HC Galychanka
- 2008–2010: CS Oltchim Râmnicu Vâlcea
- 2011–2020: Rostov-Don
National team
- Years: Team
- 2005-2010: Ukraine

Regina Zygmanto Kalinichenko (née Shymkute, born 21 December 1985) is a Ukrainian-Russian former handballer playing for Rostov-Don. She announced her retirement in May 2020.

== Personal life ==
Regina was born on 21 December 1985 in Kherson, Ukrainian SSR, Soviet Union to a Lithuanian father and an ethnic Russian mother. In March 2012, she gained Russian citizenship and renounced her Ukrainian citizenship.

On 19 April 2017, she gave birth to her daughter Taisia.

== Individual awards ==
- EHF Cup Winners' Cup Top Scorer: 2013
