= Dijana Jovetić =

Croatian handball player (born 1984)

Dijana Jovetić (née Golubić; born 21 May 1984 in Zagreb) is a Croatian handball player. She plays for the Hungarian club Szombathelyi KKA and the Croatian national team.

She participated in the 2008 European Championship, where Croatia finished 6th. Jovetić was among the top-ten goal scorers of the tournament.
