= North Macedonia women's national handball team =

North Macedonia

Information
- Nickname: Lionesses
- Association: Macedonian Handball Federation
- Coach: Igor Marković
- Assistant coach: Elena Gjeorgjievska
- Most caps: Valentina Radulovic (230)
- Most goals: Valentina Radulovic (813)

Colours
| 1st | 2nd | 3rd |

Results

World Championship
- Appearances: 5 (First in 1997)
- Best result: 7th (1997)

European Championship
- Appearances: 7 (First in 1998)
- Best result: 7th (2008)
- Last updated on Unknown.

The North Macedonia women's national handball team is the women's national handball team of North Macedonia. It is governed by the Macedonian Handball Federation and takes part in international team handball competitions.

== History ==
The first women's handball teams in Macedonia emerged in the second half of the 1940s. Soon, the Macedonian Handball federation started to organize national championships in big handball -11 players on a soccer field size. By the 1960s it was transformed into small handball or indoor handball. Macedonian champions were qualified for the federal Yugoslav Championship instead of European cup competitions. The best Macedonian players played for the Federal Team of Yugoslavia. In the time of the federation 6 of the constitutional republics were sending one federal team to compete at the Olympics and World cup. Macedonia was participating within the federal team from 1950 till 1991. After the split of the federation, as a single republic from 1992 till 1994 Macedonia didn't manage to enter the qualifications for EC, WC and OG. Since 1995, Macedonia participates as a single Republic to all qualifications and Championship tournaments. At the 1992 Olympics, the Yugoslavia team was banned to participate. At the World Cup 1993 only teams from the Olympics qualified so the Macedonian team did not have a chance to qualify. For the first European Championship 1994 team Macedonia didn't enter the qualifications. For the World Cup 1995, only teams from EURO 1994 qualified so again team Macedonian didn't get a chance to participate. Since EURO 1996 team Macedonia is regular in the qualifications. It entered 7 European Championships first one in 1998 then in 2000, 2006, 2008, 2012. Most successful was the 2008 when they finished 7th as a host. The Macedonia team qualified for the Euro 2022 as a host nation again.After hosting 2022, the national team had a successful qualifications and entered EURO 2024.For the World Cup's they entered five times (1997, 1999, 2001, 2005 and 2007). The most successful was in 1997 when they finished in 7th place. For the Olympic tournament, they had the best chance in 1999 World Cup when first they lost the 1/4 final game. Then after in the classification games for the 5th place – last spot that qualifies for the Olympics finished 8th and did not qualify.

== Home ground ==
The BTSC - Boris Trajkovski Sports Center (Macedonian: Спортски центар Борис Трајковски, Sportski centar Boris Trajkovski) in Skopje is a multi-functional indoor sports arena. It is located in the Karpoš Municipality of Skopje, North Macedonia. It is named after the former president, Boris Trajkovski. Its capacity is 10,000. There is an Olympic size Swimming Pool and 5 Star Hotel Alexander Palace within the complex. Additional Water Land Fun Park and Ice Skating Rink next to it.

The arena is a home-ground of the Macedonian handball team (men and women). The venue also contains four restaurants and a sports bar. It was one of two venues for the 2008 European Women's Handball Championship.It was a venue again for the 2022 European Women's Handball Championship

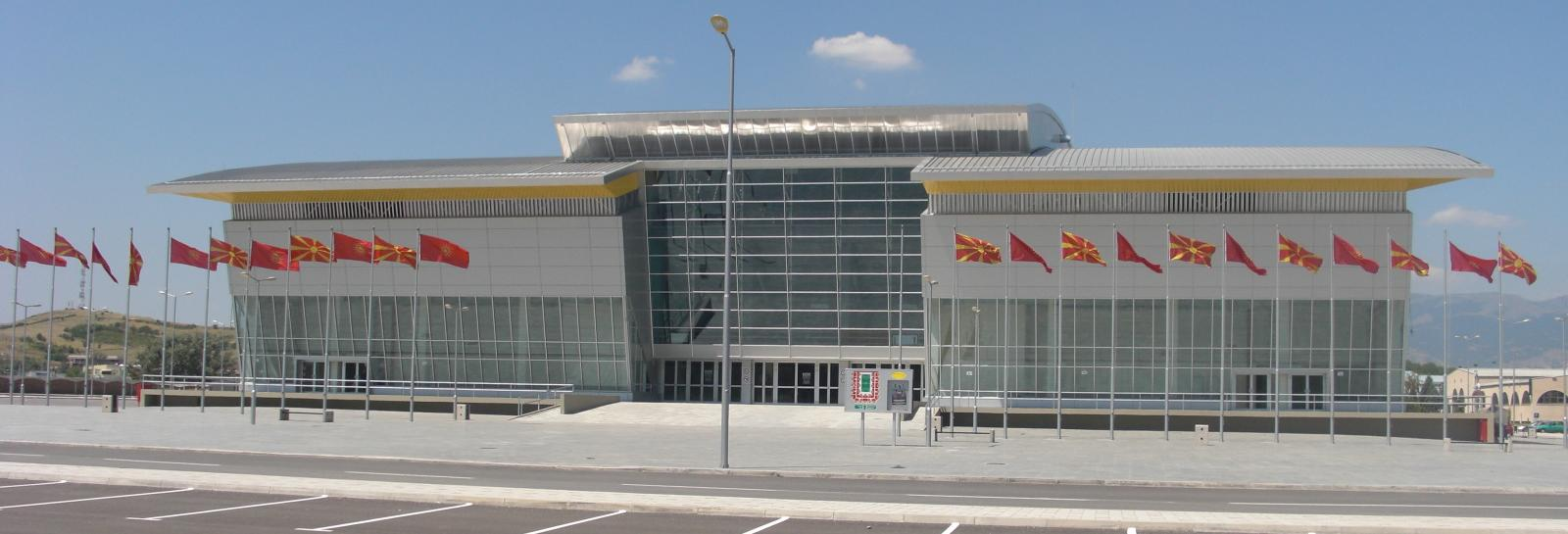
Home Ground

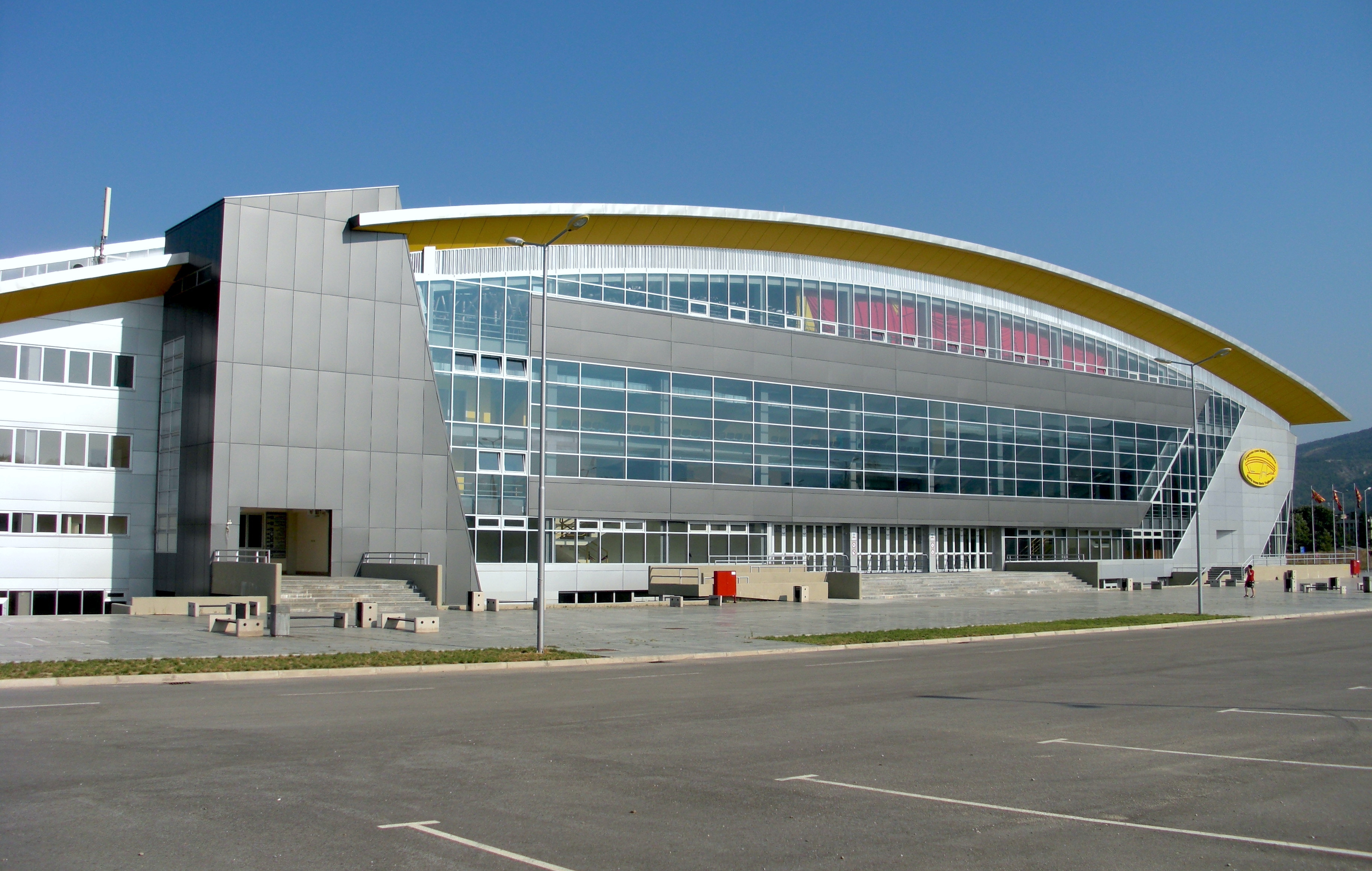
Home ground

== Results ==
During the period 1957 till 1991 Macedonia was within the Federation of SFRJ. It was represented internationally within the team Yugoslavia as part of the Federation of 6 Republics. Macedonia is not a successor of the results of team Yugoslavia it was just part of it. During that time was present at the 3 Olympics and 10 World cup tournaments within the successful team Yugoslavia. After the split Macedonian team started to compete representing the single independent Republic.

=== World Championship ===
| Czech handball World Cup | Within Yugoslavia Team |
|---|---|
| (Czech Republic) 1930 (United Kingdom) 1934 | (2),(1) |

| Year | Pos. | Pld | W | D | L |
|---|---|---|---|---|---|
| (Socialist Federal Republic of Yugoslavia) 1957 (Norway) 1993 | 1957, 1962, 1965, 1971, 1973; 1975, 1978, 1982, 1986, 1990; Within Yugoslavia team 3,4,2,2,1,5,5,3,6,2 | | | | |
| (Austria) (Hungary) 1995 | Couldn't participate | | | | |
| (Germany) 1997 | 7th | 9 | 5 | 1 | 3 |
| (Norway) 1999 | 8th | 9 | 4 | 0 | 5 |
| (Italy) 2001 | 21st | 5 | 0 | 1 | 4 |
| (Croatia) 2003 | Did not qualify | | | | |
| (Russia) 2005 | 15th | 5 | 2 | 1 | 2 |
| (France) 2007 | 12th | 8 | 2 | 1 | 5 |
| (China) 2009 | Did not qualify | | | | |
| (Brazil) 2011 | Did not qualify | | | | |
| (Serbia) 2013 | Did not qualify | | | | |
| (Denmark) 2015 | Did not qualify | | | | |
| (Germany) 2017 | Did not qualify | | | | |
| (Japan) 2019 | Did not qualify | | | | |
| (Spain) 2021 | Did not qualify | | | | |
| (Denmark) (Norway) (Sweden) 2023 | Did not qualify | | | | |
| (Germany) (Netherlands) 2025 | Did not qualify | | | | |
| (Hungary) 2027 | To be determined | | | | |
| (Spain) 2029 | To be determined | | | | |
| (Czech Republic) (Poland) 2031 | To be determined | | | | |
| Total | 5/14 | 36 | 13 | 4 | 19 |

Record against other teams at the world championship

=== European Championship ===
| Year | Pos. | Pld | W | D | L |
|---|---|---|---|---|---|
| (Germany) 1994 | couldn't participate | | | | |
| (Denmark) 1996 | | | | | |
| (Netherlands) 1998 | 8th | 6 | 2 | 0 | 4 |
| (Romania) 2000 | 8th | 6 | 1 | 2 | 3 |
| (Denmark) 2002 | | | | | |
| (Hungary) 2004 | | | | | |
| (Sweden) 2006 | 12th | 6 | 1 | 0 | 5 |
| (North Macedonia) 2008 | 7th | 6 | 3 | 0 | 3 |
| (Denmark) (Norway) 2010 | | | | | |
| (Serbia) 2012 | 16th | 3 | 0 | 0 | 3 |
| (Croatia) (Hungary) 2014 | | | | | |
| (Sweden) 2016 | | | | | |
| (France) 2018 | | | | | |
| (Denmark) 2020 | | | | | |
| (Slovenia) (North Macedonia) (Montenegro) 2022 | 16th | 3 | 0 | 0 | 3 |
| (Austria) (Hungary) (Switzerland) 2024 | 18th | 3 | 0 | 1 | 2 |
| (Czech Republic) (Poland) (Romania) (Slovakia) (Turkey) 2026 | Qualified | | | | |
| (Denmark) (Norway) (Sweden) 2028 | TBD | | | | |
| (Belgium) (France) 2030 | TBD | | | | |
| (Denmark) (Germany) (Poland) 2032 | TBD | | | | |
| Total | 8/16 | 33 | 7 | 3 | 23 |

Record against other teams at the European Championship

=== Summer Olympics ===
| Year | Round | Position | GP | W | D | L | GS | GA |
|---|---|---|---|---|---|---|---|---|
| (Canada) 1976 (Spain) 1992 | 1980, 1984, 1988,1992; Within Yugoslavia team 2,1,4,Suspended | | | | | | | |
| (United States) 1996 | Did not enter World Cup and European Championship served as qualifiers | | | | | | | |
| (Australia) 2000 | Did not qualify | | | | | | | |
| (Greece) 2004 | Did not Enter; World Cup and European Championship served as qualifiers | | | | | | | |
| (China) 2008 | Did not qualify | | | | | | | |
| (United Kingdom) 2012 | Did not enter World Cup and European Championship served as qualifiers | | | | | | | |
| (Brazil) 2016 | Did not enter World Cup and European Championship served as qualifiers | | | | | | | |
| (Japan) 2020 | Did not enter World Cup and European Championship served as qualifiers | | | | | | | |
| (France) 2024 | Did not qualify | | | | | | | |
| Total | 0/3 | – | 0 | 0 | 0 | 0 | 0 | 0 |

=== Mediterranean Games ===
| Year | Round | Position | GP | W | D | L |
|---|---|---|---|---|---|---|
| 1979–1991 | 1979, 1991; Within Yugoslavia team (1),(1) | | | | | |
| 1993–2009 | Did not participate | | | | | |
| (Turkey) 2013 | Group stage | 9th | | | | |
| (Spain) 2018 | Semi Finals | 4th | | | | |
| (Algeria) 2022 | Group stage | 7th | | | | |
| (Italy) 2026 | 5th place match | 5th | | | | |
| Total | 4/4 | – | / | / | / | / |

=== Performance in other tournaments ===
- Carpathian Trophy 1993 – 3rd
- Carpathian Trophy 1999 – 3rd
- Carpathian Trophy 2000 – 4th
- Carpathian Trophy 2001 – 6th
- Carpathian Trophy 2006 – 3rd
- Carpathian Trophy 2010 – 4th
- Carpathian Trophy 2011 – 4th
- Carpathian Trophy 2017 – 4th
- Carpathian Trophy 2024 – 5th

== Team ==
=== Current squad ===
The preliminary squad for the 2026 European Women's Handball Championship.

Head coach: Igor Marković

| No. | Pos. | Name | Date of birth (age) | Height | App. | Goals | Club |
|---|---|---|---|---|---|---|---|
| 7 | P | Ivana Gakidova | 27 February 1995 (age 31) | 1.80 m | 26 | 34 | (Poland) Szczypiorno Kalisz |
| 10 | LB | Ana Marija Kolarovska | 18 August 2002 (age 24) | 1.73 m | 8 | 10 | (North Macedonia) WHC Gjorche Petrov |
| 11 | RB | Marija Guguljanova | 11 November 1999 (age 27) | 1.73 m | 12 | 5 | (Poland) MKS Piotrcovia |
| 12 | GK | Dragana Petkovska | 12 June 1996 (age 30) | 1.75 m | 30 | 0 | (Poland) Szczypiorno Kalisz |
| 13 | P | Ivana Djatevska | 13 April 2003 (age 23) | 1.78 m | 23 | 10 | (Hungary) Szombathelyi KKA |
| 15 | LB | Marija Jankulovska | 2 November 2005 (age 21) | 1.75 m | 12 | 35 | (France) Paris 92 |
| 16 | GK | Andrea Ilikj | 18 June 2001 (age 25) | 1.72 m | 6 | 0 | (Czech Republic) DHC Plzeň |
| 17 | RW | Teodora Dukoska | 10 June 2004 (age 22) | 1.70 m | 2 | 3 | (Slovakia) IUVENTA Michalovce |
| 19 | RB | Iva Mladenovska | 14 January 2007 (age 19) | 1.80 m | 13 | 25 | (Germany) BVB Dortmund |
| 26 | GK | Jovana Micevska | 26 July 2000 (age 26) | 1.76 m | 27 | 3 | (Serbia) ŽRK Crvena zvezda |
| 30 | RB | Jovana Kiprijanovska | 30 December 2001 (age 24) | 1.84 m | 18 | 38 | (Poland) Energa Start Elbląg |
| 31 | LB | Andrea Sedloska | 6 March 2003 (age 23) | 1.83 m | 15 | 25 | (Turkey) Üsküdar BSK |
| 32 | CB | Ivana Arsenievska | 8 December 2003 (age 22) | 1.75 m | 10 | 15 | (Poland) Energa Start Elbląg |
| 33 | RW | Sara Ristovska | 9 September 1996 (age 30) | 1.69 m | 56 | 272 | (Romania) CS Rapid Bucuresti |
| 35 | LW | Leona Milenkoska | 12 October 2007 (age 19) | 1.83 m | 5 | 5 | (North Macedonia) WHC Vardar |
| 41 | LB | Sara Stefanoska | 11 January 2005 (age 21) | 1.78 m | 4 | 9 | (Hungary) Eszterházy SC |
| 43 | LW | Emilijana Rizoska | 21 May 2005 (age 21) | 1.64 m | 11 | 17 | (North Macedonia) WHC Gjorche Petrov |
| 91 | CB | Bojana Koceva | 29 September 2004 (age 22) | 1.68 m | 12 | 26 | (North Macedonia) WHC Gjorche Petrov |
| 93 | P | Katerina Damjanoska | 19 May 2003 (age 23) | 1.73 m | 12 | 9 | (Romania) CSM Târgu Mureș |

=== Notable players ===
All-Star Team

- Indira Kastratović, 1999 World Women's Handball Championship
- Larisa Ferzalieva, 2000 European Women's Handball Championship

Top scorer

- Indira Kastratović, 1997 World Women's Handball Championship

Others

- Gordana Naceva
- Marina Abramova
- Biljana Naumovska
- Valentina Radulovic
- Klara Boeva
- Dana Filipovska
- Natalija Todorovska, she scored 21 goals against Cameroon at the 2005 World Championship which is still a record in 2021
- Mileva Velkova
- Anzela Platon
- Mirjana Cupic
- Dragana Pecevska
- Olga Buyanova
- Julija Nikolić
- Mirjeta Bajramoska
- Tanja Andrejeva
- Elena Gjeorgjievska
- Marina Lambevska
- Alegra Vernalise Oholanga Loki
- Lenche Ilkova
- Dragica Kresoja

== See also ==
- North Macedonia men's national handball team
- Macedonian Handball Federation
