= 2018–19 Women's EHF Cup group stage =

This article describes the group stage of the 2018–19 Women's EHF Cup, a women's handball competition.

== Draw ==
The draw of the Women's EHF Cup group stage took place on Thursday, 22 November 2018. The 16 teams allocated into four pots were drawn into four groups of four teams.

=== Seedings ===
The seedings were announced on 19 November 2018:

Pot 1	Pot 2	Pot 3	Pot 4
(Croatia) Podravka Koprivnica; (Germany) SG BBM Bietigheim; (Norway) Larvik HK; (Sweden) IK Sävehof	(Denmark) Team Esbjerg; (France) Besançon Feminin; (Hungary) Siófok KC; (Romania) SCM Craiova	(Denmark) Viborg HK; (Spain) BM Bera Bera; (Germany) TuS Metzingen; (Norway) Storhamar HE	(Denmark) Herning-Ikast Håndbold; (Denmark) Nykøbing Falster Håndbold; (Romania) CS Măgura Cisnădie; (Russia) Kuban Krasnodar

== Format ==
In each group, teams played against each other in a double round-robin format, with home and away matches. After completion of the group stage matches, the top three teams advanced to the Quarter-finals. Teams were not able to face opponents from the same country in the group.

== Tiebreakers ==
In the group stage, teams were ranked according to points (2 points for a win, 1 point for a draw, 0 points for a loss). After completion of the group stage, if two or more teams had scored the same number of points, the ranking will be determined as follows:

1. Highest number of points in matches between the teams directly involved;
2. Superior goal difference in matches between the teams directly involved;
3. Highest number of goals scored in matches between the teams directly involved (or in the away match in case of a two-team tie);
4. Superior goal difference in all matches of the group;
5. Highest number of plus goals in all matches of the group;

If the ranking of one of these teams is determined, the above criteria are consecutively followed until the ranking of all teams is determined. If no ranking can be determined, a decision shall be obtained by EHF through drawing of lots.

== Groups ==
The matchdays were 5–6 January, 12–13 January, 19–20 January, 26–27 January, 2–3 February and 9–10 February 2019.

=== Group A ===
Pos	Team	Pld	W	D	L	GF	GA	GD	Pts	Qualification
1	(Denmark) Team Esbjerg	6	5	1	0	186	139	+47	11	Knockout stage
2	(Norway) Storhamar HE	6	3	1	2	156	150	+6	7	Knockout stage
3	(Germany) SG BBM Bietigheim	6	3	0	3	173	151	+22	6	
4	(Romania) CS Măgura Cisnădie	6	0	0	6	115	190	−75	0	

Source: EHF

5 January 2019; 19:00	SG BBM Bietigheim (Germany)	28–25	(Norway) Storhamar HE	Arena Ludwigsburg, Ludwigsburg; Attendance: 971; Referees: Rosendo, Rodriguez Estevez (ESP)
5 January 2019; 19:00	Kudłacz-Gloc, Woller 7	(15–12)	Riegelhuth 8	Arena Ludwigsburg, Ludwigsburg; Attendance: 971; Referees: Rosendo, Rodriguez Estevez (ESP)
5 January 2019; 19:00	3× (yellow card) 1× (suspension)	Report	4× (yellow card) 4× (suspension)	Arena Ludwigsburg, Ludwigsburg; Attendance: 971; Referees: Rosendo, Rodriguez Estevez (ESP)

6 January 2019; 12:30	Team Esbjerg (Denmark)	41–18	(Romania) CS Măgura Cisnădie	Blue Water Dokken, Esbjerg; Attendance: 1,312; Referees: Butskevich, Butskevich (BLR)
6 January 2019; 12:30	Liščević, Nielsen 6	(21–8)	Moldovan 7	Blue Water Dokken, Esbjerg; Attendance: 1,312; Referees: Butskevich, Butskevich (BLR)
6 January 2019; 12:30	2× (yellow card) 2× (suspension)	Report	3× (yellow card) 4× (suspension)	Blue Water Dokken, Esbjerg; Attendance: 1,312; Referees: Butskevich, Butskevich (BLR)

13 January 2019; 15:00	Storhamar HE (Norway)	28–28	(Denmark) Team Esbjerg	Boligpartner Arena, Hamar; Attendance: 1,196; Referees: Ilieva, Karbeska (MKD)
13 January 2019; 15:00	Løke 10	(14–15)	Polman 6	Boligpartner Arena, Hamar; Attendance: 1,196; Referees: Ilieva, Karbeska (MKD)
13 January 2019; 15:00	4× (yellow card) 2× (suspension)	Report	3× (yellow card) 2× (suspension)	Boligpartner Arena, Hamar; Attendance: 1,196; Referees: Ilieva, Karbeska (MKD)

13 January 2019; 18:00	CS Măgura Cisnădie (Romania)	20–34	(Germany) SG BBM Bietigheim	Sala Transilvania, Sibiu; Attendance: 1,000; Referees: Jaškins, Žabko (LAT)
13 January 2019; 18:00	Boljević 11	(13–16)	Malestein 8	Sala Transilvania, Sibiu; Attendance: 1,000; Referees: Jaškins, Žabko (LAT)
13 January 2019; 18:00	2× (yellow card) 1× (suspension)	Report	2× (yellow card) 6× (suspension)	Sala Transilvania, Sibiu; Attendance: 1,000; Referees: Jaškins, Žabko (LAT)

19 January 2019; 13:00	Team Esbjerg (Denmark)	28–27	(Germany) SG BBM Bietigheim	Blue Water Dokken, Esbjerg; Attendance: 1,320; Referees: Bounouara, Sami (FRA)
19 January 2019; 13:00	Polman 9	(15–11)	Malestein 8	Blue Water Dokken, Esbjerg; Attendance: 1,320; Referees: Bounouara, Sami (FRA)
19 January 2019; 13:00	1× (yellow card) 6× (suspension) 1× (red card)	Report	4× (yellow card) 6× (suspension)	Blue Water Dokken, Esbjerg; Attendance: 1,320; Referees: Bounouara, Sami (FRA)

19 January 2019; 18:00	CS Măgura Cisnădie (Romania)	18–26	(Norway) Storhamar HE	Sala Transilvania, Sibiu; Attendance: 1,050; Referees: Jović, Arnautović (BIH)
19 January 2019; 18:00	Moldovan 6	(7–10)	Aambakk 6	Sala Transilvania, Sibiu; Attendance: 1,050; Referees: Jović, Arnautović (BIH)
19 January 2019; 18:00	2× (yellow card) 3× (suspension)	Report	4× (yellow card) 2× (suspension)	Sala Transilvania, Sibiu; Attendance: 1,050; Referees: Jović, Arnautović (BIH)

26 January 2019; 18:00	Storhamar HE (Norway)	28–23	(Romania) CS Măgura Cisnădie	Boligpartner Arena, Hamar; Attendance: 905; Referees: Merisi, Rosca (ITA)
26 January 2019; 18:00	three players 5	(11–8)	Boljević, Moldovan 8	Boligpartner Arena, Hamar; Attendance: 905; Referees: Merisi, Rosca (ITA)
26 January 2019; 18:00	2× (yellow card) 2× (suspension)	Report	2× (yellow card) 3× (suspension)	Boligpartner Arena, Hamar; Attendance: 905; Referees: Merisi, Rosca (ITA)

27 January 2019; 16:00	SG BBM Bietigheim (Germany)	27–32	(Denmark) Team Esbjerg	Arena Ludwigsburg, Ludwigsburg; Attendance: 1,096; Referees: Vešović, Mitrović (MNE)
27 January 2019; 16:00	Malestein 5	(13–16)	Breistøl 6	Arena Ludwigsburg, Ludwigsburg; Attendance: 1,096; Referees: Vešović, Mitrović (MNE)
27 January 2019; 16:00	4× (yellow card) 5× (suspension)	Report	3× (yellow card) 3× (suspension)	Arena Ludwigsburg, Ludwigsburg; Attendance: 1,096; Referees: Vešović, Mitrović (MNE)

3 February 2019; 11:30	CS Măgura Cisnădie (Romania)	19–32	(Denmark) Team Esbjerg	Sala Transilvania, Sibiu; Attendance: 650; Referees: Chrzan, Janas (POL)
3 February 2019; 11:30	Moldovan 9	(10–15)	Solberg 7	Sala Transilvania, Sibiu; Attendance: 650; Referees: Chrzan, Janas (POL)
3 February 2019; 11:30	1× (yellow card) 3× (suspension)	Report	1× (yellow card) 2× (suspension)	Sala Transilvania, Sibiu; Attendance: 650; Referees: Chrzan, Janas (POL)

3 February 2019; 15:00	Storhamar HE (Norway)	29–28	(Germany) SG BBM Bietigheim	Boligpartner Arena, Hamar; Attendance: 1,200; Referees: Ershov, Pavliukov (RUS)
3 February 2019; 15:00	Riegelhuth 9	(12–16)	Woller 7	Boligpartner Arena, Hamar; Attendance: 1,200; Referees: Ershov, Pavliukov (RUS)
3 February 2019; 15:00	2× (yellow card) 2× (suspension)	Report	3× (yellow card) 1× (suspension)	Boligpartner Arena, Hamar; Attendance: 1,200; Referees: Ershov, Pavliukov (RUS)

9 February 2019; 13:00	Team Esbjerg (Denmark)	25–20	(Norway) Storhamar HE	Blue Water Dokken, Esbjerg; Attendance: 1,523; Referees: Šniūrevičius, Grigalionis (LTU)
9 February 2019; 13:00	Polman 8	(11–10)	Riegelhuth 8	Blue Water Dokken, Esbjerg; Attendance: 1,523; Referees: Šniūrevičius, Grigalionis (LTU)
9 February 2019; 13:00	2× (yellow card) 2× (suspension)	Report	1× (yellow card) 4× (suspension)	Blue Water Dokken, Esbjerg; Attendance: 1,523; Referees: Šniūrevičius, Grigalionis (LTU)

10 February 2019; 17:00	SG BBM Bietigheim (Germany)	29–17	(Romania) CS Măgura Cisnădie	Arena Ludwigsburg, Ludwigsburg; Attendance: 1,289; Referees: Geraets, Geraets (NED)
10 February 2019; 17:00	Malestein 6	(18–9)	Gatzel 8	Arena Ludwigsburg, Ludwigsburg; Attendance: 1,289; Referees: Geraets, Geraets (NED)
10 February 2019; 17:00	4× (yellow card) 3× (suspension)	Report	2× (yellow card) 2× (suspension)	Arena Ludwigsburg, Ludwigsburg; Attendance: 1,289; Referees: Geraets, Geraets (NED)

=== Group B ===
Pos	Team	Pld	W	D	L	GF	GA	GD	Pts	Qualification
1	(Hungary) Siófok KC	6	6	0	0	188	149	+39	12	Knockout stage
2	(Denmark) Herning-Ikast Håndbold	6	4	0	2	164	157	+7	8	Knockout stage
3	(Germany) TuS Metzingen	6	2	0	4	172	173	−1	4	
4	(Sweden) IK Sävehof	6	0	0	6	139	184	−45	0	

Source: EHF

5 January 2019; 18:00	Siófok KC (Hungary)	25–21	(Denmark) Herning-Ikast Håndbold	Kiss Szilárd Sportcsarnok, Siófok; Attendance: 1,185; Referees: Vitaku, Vitaku (KOS)
5 January 2019; 18:00	Kobetić 11	(14–11)	Friis 6	Kiss Szilárd Sportcsarnok, Siófok; Attendance: 1,185; Referees: Vitaku, Vitaku (KOS)
5 January 2019; 18:00	3× (yellow card) 2× (suspension)	Report	4× (yellow card) 3× (suspension)	Kiss Szilárd Sportcsarnok, Siófok; Attendance: 1,185; Referees: Vitaku, Vitaku (KOS)

6 January 2019; 19:00	IK Sävehof (Sweden)	27–29	(Germany) TuS Metzingen	Partille Arena, Partille; Attendance: 534; Referees: Lidacka, Lesiak (POL)
6 January 2019; 19:00	Forsberg, Mellegård 5	(13–16)	Minevskaja 7	Partille Arena, Partille; Attendance: 534; Referees: Lidacka, Lesiak (POL)
6 January 2019; 19:00	3× (yellow card) 5× (suspension)	Report	2× (yellow card) 3× (suspension)	Partille Arena, Partille; Attendance: 534; Referees: Lidacka, Lesiak (POL)

12 January 2019; 20:00	TuS Metzingen (Germany)	26–33	(Hungary) Siófok KC	Öschhalle, Metzingen; Attendance: 1,050; Referees: Ben-Dan, Faran (ISR)
12 January 2019; 20:00	Kobylińska 7	(13–17)	Kobetić 13	Öschhalle, Metzingen; Attendance: 1,050; Referees: Ben-Dan, Faran (ISR)
12 January 2019; 20:00	3× (yellow card) 3× (suspension)	Report	3× (yellow card) 3× (suspension) 1× (red card)	Öschhalle, Metzingen; Attendance: 1,050; Referees: Ben-Dan, Faran (ISR)

13 January 2019; 16:30	Herning-Ikast Håndbold (Denmark)	29–22	(Sweden) IK Sävehof	Ikast-Brande Arena, Ikast; Attendance: 818; Referees: Hofer, Schmidhuber (AUT)
13 January 2019; 16:30	Fauske 10	(15–9)	Forsberg, Mellegård 4	Ikast-Brande Arena, Ikast; Attendance: 818; Referees: Hofer, Schmidhuber (AUT)
13 January 2019; 16:30	1× (yellow card) 2× (suspension)	Report	3× (yellow card) 2× (suspension)	Ikast-Brande Arena, Ikast; Attendance: 818; Referees: Hofer, Schmidhuber (AUT)

19 January 2019; 18:00	Siófok KC (Hungary)	34–21	(Sweden) IK Sävehof	Kiss Szilárd Sportcsarnok, Siófok; Attendance: 1,500; Referees: Duplii, Pobedrina (UKR)
19 January 2019; 18:00	Böhme 7	(19–11)	Ekenman-Fernis 7	Kiss Szilárd Sportcsarnok, Siófok; Attendance: 1,500; Referees: Duplii, Pobedrina (UKR)
19 January 2019; 18:00	1× (yellow card) 1× (suspension)	Report	2× (yellow card) 3× (suspension)	Kiss Szilárd Sportcsarnok, Siófok; Attendance: 1,500; Referees: Duplii, Pobedrina (UKR)

20 January 2019; 16:00	Herning-Ikast Håndbold (Denmark)	31–28	(Germany) TuS Metzingen	Ikast-Brande Arena, Ikast; Attendance: 1,322; Referees: Braseth, Sundet (NOR)
20 January 2019; 16:00	Fauske 11	(14–15)	Kobylińska 9	Ikast-Brande Arena, Ikast; Attendance: 1,322; Referees: Braseth, Sundet (NOR)
20 January 2019; 16:00	2× (yellow card) 4× (suspension)	Report	2× (yellow card) 2× (suspension)	Ikast-Brande Arena, Ikast; Attendance: 1,322; Referees: Braseth, Sundet (NOR)

26 January 2019; 15:30	IK Sävehof (Sweden)	24–30	(Hungary) Siófok KC	Partille Arena, Partille; Attendance: 348; Referees: Beqiri, Krasniqi (KOS)
26 January 2019; 15:30	Lundbäck 6	(13–14)	Kobetić 10	Partille Arena, Partille; Attendance: 348; Referees: Beqiri, Krasniqi (KOS)
26 January 2019; 15:30	3× (yellow card) 1× (suspension)	Report	4× (yellow card) 3× (suspension)	Partille Arena, Partille; Attendance: 348; Referees: Beqiri, Krasniqi (KOS)

26 January 2019; 20:00	TuS Metzingen (Germany)	25–28	(Denmark) Herning-Ikast Håndbold	Öschhalle, Metzingen; Attendance: 800; Referees: Hatipoğlu, Şimşek (TUR)
26 January 2019; 20:00	Minevskaja 5	(10–16)	Fauske 7	Öschhalle, Metzingen; Attendance: 800; Referees: Hatipoğlu, Şimşek (TUR)
26 January 2019; 20:00	3× (yellow card) 2× (suspension)	Report	4× (yellow card) 5× (suspension)	Öschhalle, Metzingen; Attendance: 800; Referees: Hatipoğlu, Şimşek (TUR)

2 February 2019; 20:00	TuS Metzingen (Germany)	29–22	(Sweden) IK Sävehof	Paul Horn-Arena, Metzingen; Attendance: 900; Referees: Lončar, Lončar (CRO)
2 February 2019; 20:00	Minevskaja 10	(18–10)	Ekenman-Fernis 6	Paul Horn-Arena, Metzingen; Attendance: 900; Referees: Lončar, Lončar (CRO)
2 February 2019; 20:00	2× (yellow card) 3× (suspension)	Report	2× (yellow card) 4× (suspension)	Paul Horn-Arena, Metzingen; Attendance: 900; Referees: Lončar, Lončar (CRO)

3 February 2019; 14:00	Herning-Ikast Håndbold (Denmark)	22–34	(Hungary) Siófok KC	Ikast-Brande Arena, Ikast; Attendance: 1,381; Referees: Pirvu, Potirniche (ROU)
3 February 2019; 14:00	Fauske 7	(8–20)	Minko 8	Ikast-Brande Arena, Ikast; Attendance: 1,381; Referees: Pirvu, Potirniche (ROU)
3 February 2019; 14:00	4× (yellow card) 3× (suspension)	Report	4× (yellow card) 5× (suspension)	Ikast-Brande Arena, Ikast; Attendance: 1,381; Referees: Pirvu, Potirniche (ROU)

10 February 2019; 15:00	IK Sävehof (Sweden)	23–33	(Denmark) Herning-Ikast Håndbold	Partille Arena, Partille; Attendance: 342; Referees: Freitas, Carvalho (POR)
10 February 2019; 15:00	Olsson 6	(12–17)	Fauske 12	Partille Arena, Partille; Attendance: 342; Referees: Freitas, Carvalho (POR)
10 February 2019; 15:00	2× (yellow card) 5× (suspension)	Report	2× (yellow card) 3× (suspension)	Partille Arena, Partille; Attendance: 342; Referees: Freitas, Carvalho (POR)

10 February 2019; 15:00	Siófok KC (Hungary)	32–25	(Germany) TuS Metzingen	Kiss Szilárd Sportcsarnok, Siófok; Attendance: 1,150; Referees: Ilieva, Karbeska (MKD)
10 February 2019; 15:00	Böhme, González 7	(13–11)	Vollebregt, Kobylińska 6	Kiss Szilárd Sportcsarnok, Siófok; Attendance: 1,150; Referees: Ilieva, Karbeska (MKD)
10 February 2019; 15:00	3× (yellow card) 1× (suspension)	Report	4× (yellow card) 1× (suspension)	Kiss Szilárd Sportcsarnok, Siófok; Attendance: 1,150; Referees: Ilieva, Karbeska (MKD)

=== Group C ===
Pos	Team	Pld	W	D	L	GF	GA	GD	Pts	Qualification
1	(Denmark) Viborg HK	6	6	0	0	178	155	+23	12	Knockout stage
2	(Russia) Kuban Krasnodar	6	2	1	3	161	158	+3	5	Knockout stage
3	(France) Besançon Feminin	6	2	0	4	162	172	−10	4	
4	(Norway) Larvik HK	6	1	1	4	152	170	−18	3	

Source: EHF

4 January 2019; 18:30	Larvik HK (Norway)	28–31	(Denmark) Viborg HK	Boligmappa Arena Larvik, Larvik; Attendance: 628; Referees: Peturrson, Þrastarson (ISL)
4 January 2019; 18:30	Christensen 8	(13–21)	Haugsted 8	Boligmappa Arena Larvik, Larvik; Attendance: 628; Referees: Peturrson, Þrastarson (ISL)
4 January 2019; 18:30	1× (yellow card) 3× (suspension)	Report	3× (yellow card) 4× (suspension)	Boligmappa Arena Larvik, Larvik; Attendance: 628; Referees: Peturrson, Þrastarson (ISL)

5 January 2019; 20:00	Besançon Feminin (France)	23–26	(Russia) Kuban Krasnodar	Palais des Sports, Besançon; Attendance: 3,300; Referees: Florescu, Stoia (ROU)
5 January 2019; 20:00	Lévêque 6	(14–14)	Golub 8	Palais des Sports, Besançon; Attendance: 3,300; Referees: Florescu, Stoia (ROU)
5 January 2019; 20:00	3× (yellow card) 2× (suspension)	Report	3× (yellow card) 7× (suspension) 1× (red card)	Palais des Sports, Besançon; Attendance: 3,300; Referees: Florescu, Stoia (ROU)

12 January 2019; 16:00	Viborg HK (Denmark)	35–26	(France) Besançon Feminin	Vibocold Arena Viborg, Viborg; Attendance: 2,863; Referees: Christidi, Papamattheou (GRE)
12 January 2019; 16:00	Hansen 7	(15–10)	Burlet 4	Vibocold Arena Viborg, Viborg; Attendance: 2,863; Referees: Christidi, Papamattheou (GRE)
12 January 2019; 16:00	3× (yellow card) 2× (suspension)	Report	2× (yellow card) 2× (suspension)	Vibocold Arena Viborg, Viborg; Attendance: 2,863; Referees: Christidi, Papamattheou (GRE)

13 January 2019; 16:00	Kuban Krasnodar (Russia)	32–26	(Norway) Larvik HK	Olympus Arena, Krasnodar; Attendance: 2,200; Referees: Di Domenico, Fornasier (ITA)
13 January 2019; 16:00	Barkalova, Skorobogatchenko 8	(14–16)	Møller, Toft 5	Olympus Arena, Krasnodar; Attendance: 2,200; Referees: Di Domenico, Fornasier (ITA)
13 January 2019; 16:00	2× (yellow card) 2× (suspension)	Report	4× (yellow card) 1× (suspension)	Olympus Arena, Krasnodar; Attendance: 2,200; Referees: Di Domenico, Fornasier (ITA)

19 January 2019; 16:00	Kuban Krasnodar (Russia)	27–31	(Denmark) Viborg HK	Olympus Arena, Krasnodar; Attendance: 1,800; Referees: Metalari, Nikolovski (MKD)
19 January 2019; 16:00	Golub 7	(14–14)	Jørgensen 9	Olympus Arena, Krasnodar; Attendance: 1,800; Referees: Metalari, Nikolovski (MKD)
19 January 2019; 16:00	2× (yellow card) 5× (suspension)	Report	2× (yellow card) 7× (suspension)	Olympus Arena, Krasnodar; Attendance: 1,800; Referees: Metalari, Nikolovski (MKD)

20 January 2019; 18:00	Besançon Feminin (France)	32–25	(Norway) Larvik HK	Palais des Sports, Besançon; Attendance: 2,800; Referees: Bíró, Kiss (HUN)
20 January 2019; 18:00	Bouquet 7	(14–11)	Lund, Molid 5	Palais des Sports, Besançon; Attendance: 2,800; Referees: Bíró, Kiss (HUN)
20 January 2019; 18:00	2× (yellow card) 4× (suspension)	Report	1× (yellow card) 5× (suspension)	Palais des Sports, Besançon; Attendance: 2,800; Referees: Bíró, Kiss (HUN)

26 January 2019; 18:30	Larvik HK (Norway)	29–26	(France) Besançon Feminin	Boligmappa Arena Larvik, Larvik; Attendance: 395; Referees: Antić, Jakovljević (SRB)
26 January 2019; 18:30	Christensen 6	(15–12)	Bouquet 6	Boligmappa Arena Larvik, Larvik; Attendance: 395; Referees: Antić, Jakovljević (SRB)
26 January 2019; 18:30	2× (yellow card) 6× (suspension)	Report	2× (yellow card) 5× (suspension) 1× (red card)	Boligmappa Arena Larvik, Larvik; Attendance: 395; Referees: Antić, Jakovljević (SRB)

27 January 2019; 16:00	Viborg HK (Denmark)	26–25	(Russia) Kuban Krasnodar	Vibocold Arena Viborg, Viborg; Attendance: 1,051; Referees: Merz, Schilha (GER)
27 January 2019; 16:00	Nørgaard 7	(15–13)	Frolova, Golub 8	Vibocold Arena Viborg, Viborg; Attendance: 1,051; Referees: Merz, Schilha (GER)
27 January 2019; 16:00	2× (yellow card) 1× (suspension)	Report	2× (yellow card) 3× (suspension)	Vibocold Arena Viborg, Viborg; Attendance: 1,051; Referees: Merz, Schilha (GER)

2 February 2019; 16:00	Viborg HK (Denmark)	26–23	(Norway) Larvik HK	Vibocold Arena Viborg, Viborg; Attendance: 1,054; Referees: Martins, Martins (POR)
2 February 2019; 16:00	Högdahl 6	(11–17)	Løken 5	Vibocold Arena Viborg, Viborg; Attendance: 1,054; Referees: Martins, Martins (POR)
2 February 2019; 16:00	1× (yellow card) 3× (suspension)	Report	2× (yellow card) 2× (suspension)	Vibocold Arena Viborg, Viborg; Attendance: 1,054; Referees: Martins, Martins (POR)

3 February 2019; 16:00	Kuban Krasnodar (Russia)	28–29	(France) Besançon Feminin	Olympus Arena, Krasnodar; Attendance: 1,800; Referees: Ben-Dan, Faran (ISR)
3 February 2019; 16:00	Golub 9	(15–15)	three players 5	Olympus Arena, Krasnodar; Attendance: 1,800; Referees: Ben-Dan, Faran (ISR)
3 February 2019; 16:00	1× (yellow card) 7× (suspension)	Report	3× (yellow card) 6× (suspension)	Olympus Arena, Krasnodar; Attendance: 1,800; Referees: Ben-Dan, Faran (ISR)

9 February 2019; 16:00	Larvik HK (Norway)	23–23	(Russia) Kuban Krasnodar	Boligmappa Arena Larvik, Larvik; Attendance: 435; Referees: Jaškins, Žabko (LAT)
9 February 2019; 16:00	Andenæs 5	(11–12)	Skorobogatchenko 7	Boligmappa Arena Larvik, Larvik; Attendance: 435; Referees: Jaškins, Žabko (LAT)
9 February 2019; 16:00	2× (yellow card) 5× (suspension)	Report	2× (yellow card) 5× (suspension)	Boligmappa Arena Larvik, Larvik; Attendance: 435; Referees: Jaškins, Žabko (LAT)

10 February 2019; 18:00	Besançon Feminin (France)	26–29	(Denmark) Viborg HK	Palais des Sports, Besançon; Attendance: 3,300; Referees: Duplii, Pobedrina (UKR)
10 February 2019; 18:00	Dupuis 8	(14–14)	Haugsted, Nørgaard 7	Palais des Sports, Besançon; Attendance: 3,300; Referees: Duplii, Pobedrina (UKR)
10 February 2019; 18:00	2× (yellow card) 3× (suspension)	Report	3× (yellow card) 4× (suspension)	Palais des Sports, Besançon; Attendance: 3,300; Referees: Duplii, Pobedrina (UKR)

=== Group D ===
Pos	Team	Pld	W	D	L	GF	GA	GD	Pts	Qualification
1	(Croatia) Podravka Koprivnica	6	4	0	2	160	154	+6	8	Knockout stage
2	(Denmark) Nykøbing Falster Håndbold	6	3	1	2	151	145	+6	7	Knockout stage
3	(Romania) SCM Craiova	6	2	1	3	126	136	−10	5	
4	(Spain) BM Bera Bera	6	2	0	4	170	172	−2	4	

Source: EHF

5 January 2019; 18:00	SCM Craiova (Romania)	18–12	(Denmark) Nykøbing Falster Håndbold	Polyvalent Hall, Craiova; Attendance: 4,000. Referees: Hájek, Macho (CZE)
5 January 2019; 18:00	Ianași, Šerić 4	(9–6)	Nolsøe, Westberg 3	Polyvalent Hall, Craiova; Attendance: 4,000. Referees: Hájek, Macho (CZE)
5 January 2019; 18:00	3× (yellow card) 4× (suspension)	Report	4× (yellow card) 1× (suspension)	Polyvalent Hall, Craiova; Attendance: 4,000. Referees: Hájek, Macho (CZE)

6 January 2019; 18:00	Podravka Koprivnica (Croatia)	32–29	(Spain) BM Bera Bera	Gimnazija "Fran Galović", Koprivnica; Attendance: 2,200; Referees: Doychinov, Goretsov (BUL)
6 January 2019; 18:00	Chigirinova 6	(15–14)	Castro 8	Gimnazija "Fran Galović", Koprivnica; Attendance: 2,200; Referees: Doychinov, Goretsov (BUL)
6 January 2019; 18:00	4× (yellow card) 5× (suspension)	Report	1× (yellow card) 6× (suspension)	Gimnazija "Fran Galović", Koprivnica; Attendance: 2,200; Referees: Doychinov, Goretsov (BUL)

12 January 2019; 18:00	BM Bera Bera (Spain)	32–21	(Romania) SCM Craiova	Polideportivo Municipal Bidebieta, San Sebastián; Attendance: 2,600; Referees: Lindenbaum, Laron (ISR)
12 January 2019; 18:00	Arderíus 6	(18–10)	Vizitiu 7	Polideportivo Municipal Bidebieta, San Sebastián; Attendance: 2,600; Referees: Lindenbaum, Laron (ISR)
12 January 2019; 18:00	3× (yellow card) 3× (suspension)	Report	1× (yellow card) 5× (suspension)	Polideportivo Municipal Bidebieta, San Sebastián; Attendance: 2,600; Referees: Lindenbaum, Laron (ISR)

13 January 2019; 18:00	Nykøbing Falster Håndbold (Denmark)	24–28	(Croatia) Podravka Koprivnica	POWER ARENA, Nykøbing Falster; Attendance: 1,223; Referees: Vranes, Wenninger (AUT)
13 January 2019; 18:00	Wallén 6	(10–13)	Debelić 8	POWER ARENA, Nykøbing Falster; Attendance: 1,223; Referees: Vranes, Wenninger (AUT)
13 January 2019; 18:00	2× (yellow card) 4× (suspension)	Report	2× (yellow card) 5× (suspension)	POWER ARENA, Nykøbing Falster; Attendance: 1,223; Referees: Vranes, Wenninger (AUT)

18 January 2019; 18:30	SCM Craiova (Romania)	23–26	(Croatia) Podravka Koprivnica	Polyvalent Hall, Craiova; Attendance: 3,000; Referees: Smailagic, Smailagic (SWE)
18 January 2019; 18:30	Ianași 6	(10–10)	Debelić 7	Polyvalent Hall, Craiova; Attendance: 3,000; Referees: Smailagic, Smailagic (SWE)
18 January 2019; 18:30	2× (yellow card) 4× (suspension)	Report	3× (yellow card) 5× (suspension) 1× (red card)	Polyvalent Hall, Craiova; Attendance: 3,000; Referees: Smailagic, Smailagic (SWE)

19 January 2019; 15:00	Nykøbing Falster Håndbold (Denmark)	31–26	(Spain) BM Bera Bera	POWER ARENA, Nykøbing Falster; Attendance: 1,002; Referees: Backović, Palačković (SLO)
19 January 2019; 15:00	Housheer 10	(13–15)	Karsten 7	POWER ARENA, Nykøbing Falster; Attendance: 1,002; Referees: Backović, Palačković (SLO)
19 January 2019; 15:00	4× (yellow card) 5× (suspension) 1× (red card)	Report	3× (yellow card) 5× (suspension)	POWER ARENA, Nykøbing Falster; Attendance: 1,002; Referees: Backović, Palačković (SLO)

26 January 2019; 14:30	Podravka Koprivnica (Croatia)	23–18	(Romania) SCM Craiova	Gimnazija "Fran Galović", Koprivnica; Attendance: 2,000; Referees: Novikov, Rozhkov (UKR)
26 January 2019; 14:30	Chigirinova, Debelić 5	(13–9)	Ianași, Trifunović 4	Gimnazija "Fran Galović", Koprivnica; Attendance: 2,000; Referees: Novikov, Rozhkov (UKR)
26 January 2019; 14:30	2× (yellow card) 5× (suspension) 1× (red card)	Report	3× (suspension)	Gimnazija "Fran Galović", Koprivnica; Attendance: 2,000; Referees: Novikov, Rozhkov (UKR)

26 January 2019; 17:00	BM Bera Bera (Spain)	28–36	(Denmark) Nykøbing Falster Håndbold	Polideportivo Municipal Bidebieta, San Sebastián; Attendance: 1,700; Referees: Bennani, Bennani (SWE)
26 January 2019; 17:00	Arderíus 6	(17–20)	Lagerquist 11	Polideportivo Municipal Bidebieta, San Sebastián; Attendance: 1,700; Referees: Bennani, Bennani (SWE)
26 January 2019; 17:00	1× (yellow card) 2× (suspension)	Report	2× (yellow card) 3× (suspension)	Polideportivo Municipal Bidebieta, San Sebastián; Attendance: 1,700; Referees: Bennani, Bennani (SWE)

3 February 2019; 12:00	BM Bera Bera (Spain)	32–26	(Croatia) Podravka Koprivnica	Polideportivo Municipal Bidebieta, San Sebastián; Attendance: 1,350; Referees: Argyridis, Mouttas (CYP)
3 February 2019; 12:00	Karsten 8	(13–12)	Holešová 6	Polideportivo Municipal Bidebieta, San Sebastián; Attendance: 1,350; Referees: Argyridis, Mouttas (CYP)
3 February 2019; 12:00	2× (yellow card) 3× (suspension)	Report	1× (yellow card) 7× (suspension)	Polideportivo Municipal Bidebieta, San Sebastián; Attendance: 1,350; Referees: Argyridis, Mouttas (CYP)

3 February 2019; 18:00	Nykøbing Falster Håndbold (Denmark)	20–20	(Romania) SCM Craiova	POWER ARENA, Nykøbing Falster; Attendance: 1,178; Referees: Vitaku, Vitaku (KOS)
3 February 2019; 18:00	Olsen 4	(8–9)	Tătar 5	POWER ARENA, Nykøbing Falster; Attendance: 1,178; Referees: Vitaku, Vitaku (KOS)
3 February 2019; 18:00	3× (yellow card) 4× (suspension)	Report	3× (yellow card) 4× (suspension) 1× (red card)	POWER ARENA, Nykøbing Falster; Attendance: 1,178; Referees: Vitaku, Vitaku (KOS)

9 February 2019; 17:30	Podravka Koprivnica (Croatia)	25–28	(Denmark) Nykøbing Falster Håndbold	Gimnazija "Fran Galović", Koprivnica; Attendance: 2,200; Referees: Mertinian, Syrepisios (GRE)
9 February 2019; 17:30	Chigirinova 7	(11–14)	Housheer, Nolsøe 9	Gimnazija "Fran Galović", Koprivnica; Attendance: 2,200; Referees: Mertinian, Syrepisios (GRE)
9 February 2019; 17:30	4× (yellow card) 6× (suspension) 1× (red card)	Report	4× (yellow card) 4× (suspension)	Gimnazija "Fran Galović", Koprivnica; Attendance: 2,200; Referees: Mertinian, Syrepisios (GRE)

10 February 2019; 18:00	SCM Craiova (Romania)	26–23	(Spain) BM Bera Bera	Polyvalent Hall, Craiova; Attendance: 1,800; Referees: Pandzic, Satordzija (BIH)
10 February 2019; 18:00	Vizitiu 7	(13–11)	Castro 10	Polyvalent Hall, Craiova; Attendance: 1,800; Referees: Pandzic, Satordzija (BIH)
10 February 2019; 18:00	3× (yellow card) 5× (suspension)	Report	3× (yellow card) 3× (suspension)	Polyvalent Hall, Craiova; Attendance: 1,800; Referees: Pandzic, Satordzija (BIH)
