= 2018–19 Women's EHF Cup =

European handball tournament

Women's EHF Cup
- 2018–19

Tournament information
- Sport: Handball
- Dates: 8 September 2018–12 May 2019
- Teams: 48+6 (qualification stage); 16 (group stage)
- Website: eurohandball.com

Final positions
- Champions: (Hungary) Siófok KC
- Runner-up: (Denmark) Team Esbjerg

Tournament statistics
- Top scorer(s): (Croatia) Andrea Kobetić (75 goals)

The 2018–19 Women's EHF Cup was the 38th edition of EHF's second-tier women's handball competition. It started on 8 September 2018.

Siófok KC defeated Team Esbjerg 47–42 in the final.

== Overview ==
=== Team allocation ===
Group stage
(Norway) Larvik HK	(Sweden) IK Sävehof	(Croatia) Podravka Koprivnica	(Germany) SG BBM Bietigheim
Round 3
(Czech Republic) DHK Baník Most	(Denmark) Team Esbjerg	(Poland) MKS Lublin	(Romania) SCM Craiova
(Hungary) Érd HC	(Russia) HC Lada	(Spain) BM Bera Bera	(Serbia) ŽORK Jagodina
Round 2
(Austria) Hypo Niederösterreich	(Denmark) Herning-Ikast Håndbold	(Romania) SCM Râmnicu Vâlcea	(Russia) HC Astrakhanochka
(Germany) Buxtehuder SV	(Hungary) Dunaújvárosi KKA	(France) Besançon Feminin	(Italy) Jomi Salerno
(Denmark) Nykøbing Falster Håndbold	(Romania) CS Măgura Cisnădie	(Russia) Kuban Krasnodar	(Turkey) Muratpaşa BSK
(Hungary) Siófok KC	(France) Nantes Loire Atlantique Handball	(Norway) Byåsen Handball Elite	
(Germany) Borussia Dortmund Handball	(Romania) HC Zalău	(Norway) Storhamar HE	
Round 1
(Denmark) Viborg HK	(Russia) Zvezda Zvenigorod	(Germany) TuS Metzingen	(Hungary) GVM Europe-Vác
(France) Issy Paris Hand	(Norway) Fredrikstad BK	(Czech Republic) DHC Slavia Prague	(Turkey) Kastamonu Belediyesi
(Poland) Metraco Zagłębie Lubin	(Sweden) H 65 Höör	(Switzerland) SPONO Eagles	(Spain) Mecalia Atlético Guardés
(Belarus) HC BNTU-BelAZ Minsk	(Netherlands) VOC Amsterdam	(Slovakia) IUVENTA Michalovce	(Croatia) RK Lokomotiva Zagreb
(Ukraine) HC Galychanka	(Azerbaijan) HC Azersu	(North Macedonia) ŽRK Metalurg	(Kosovo) KHF Shqiponja
(Israel) Maccabi Arazim Ramat Gan	(Bosnia and Herzegovina) HŽRK Grude	(Cyprus) Youth Union Athienou	(Luxembourg) Handball Käerjeng
(Austria) UHC Stockerau	(Switzerland) LC Brühl Handball	(Netherlands) Morrenhof Jansen Dalfsen	(Switzerland) LK Zug

== Round and draw dates ==
The schedule of the competition was as follows (all draws were held at the EHF headquarters in Vienna, Austria).

Phase	Round	Draw date	First leg	Second leg
Qualification	First qualifying round	17 July 2018	8–9 September 2018	14–15 September 2018
Qualification	Second qualifying round	17 July 2018	13–14 October 2018	20–21 October 2018
Qualification	Third qualifying round	23 October 2018	10–11 November 2018	17–18 November 2018
Group stage	Matchday 1	22 November 2018	5–6 January 2019	
Group stage	Matchday 2	22 November 2018	12–13 January 2019	
Group stage	Matchday 3	22 November 2018	19–20 January 2019	
Group stage	Matchday 4	22 November 2018	26–27 January 2019	
Group stage	Matchday 5	22 November 2018	2–3 February 2019	
Group stage	Matchday 6	22 November 2018	9–10 February 2019	
Knockout phase	Quarter-finals	12 February 2019	2–3 March 2019	9–10 March 2019
Knockout phase	Semi finals	12 February 2019	6–7 April 2019	13–14 April 2019
Knockout phase	Final	16 April 2019	4–5 May 2019	11–12 May 2019

== Qualification stage ==
=== Round 1 ===
There were 28 teams participating in round 1. The draw seeding pots were composed as follows:

Pot 1	Pot 2
(Denmark) Viborg HK; (Russia) Zvezda Zvenigorod; (Germany) TuS Metzingen; (Hungary) GVM Europe-Vác; (France) Issy Paris Hand; (Norway) Fredrikstad BK; (Czech Republic) DHC Slavia Prague; (Turkey) Kastamonu Belediyesi; (Poland) Metraco Zagłębie Lubin; (Sweden) H 65 Höör; (Switzerland) SPONO Eagles; (Spain) Mecalia Atlético Guardés; (Belarus) HC BNTU-BelAZ Minsk; (Netherlands) VOC Amsterdam	(Slovakia) IUVENTA Michalovce; (Croatia) RK Lokomotiva Zagreb; (Ukraine) HC Galychanka; (Azerbaijan) HC Azersu; (North Macedonia) ŽRK Metalurg; (Kosovo) KHF Shqiponja; (Israel) Maccabi Arazim Ramat Gan; (Bosnia and Herzegovina) HŽRK Grude; (Cyprus) Youth Union Athienou; (Luxembourg) Handball Käerjeng; (Austria) UHC Stockerau; (Switzerland) LC Brühl Handball; (Netherlands) Morrenhof Jansen Dalfsen; (Switzerland) LK Zug

The first legs were played on 8–9 and the second legs were played on 15–16 September 2018. Some teams agreed to play both matches in the same venue.

Team 1	Agg.	Team 2	1st leg	2nd leg
Metraco Zagłębie Lubin (Poland)	57–47 ^{1}	(Azerbaijan) HC Azersu	27–21	30–26
ŽRK Metalurg (North Macedonia)	26–64 ^{2}	(France) Issy Paris Hand	15–31	11–33
Zvezda Zvenigorod (Russia)	58–47	(Switzerland) LK Zug	30–24	28–23
VOC Amsterdam (Netherlands)	50–67 ^{3}	(Slovakia) IUVENTA Michalovce	24–37	26–30
Viborg HK (Denmark)	66–44 ^{4}	(Ukraine) HC Galychanka	33–22	33–22
HC BNTU-BelAZ Minsk (Belarus)	62–33 ^{5}	(Luxembourg) Handball Käerjeng	33–17	29–16
HŽRK Grude (Bosnia and Herzegovina)	41–90 ^{6}	(Germany) TuS Metzingen	24–43	17–47
SPONO Eagles (Switzerland)	71–28 ^{7}	(Kosovo) KHF Shqiponja	35–14	36–14
Mecalia Atlético Guardés (Spain)	83–21 ^{8}	(Cyprus) Youth Union Athienou	42–9	41–12
Morrenhof Jansen Dalfsen (Netherlands)	43–54 ^{9}	(Norway) Fredrikstad BK	27–28	16–26
H 65 Höör (Sweden)	45–37	(Croatia) RK Lokomotiva Zagreb	22–18	23–19
DHC Slavia Prague (Czech Republic)	56–53 ^{12}	(Austria) UHC Stockerau	32–23	24–30
LC Brühl Handball (Switzerland)	46–58 ^{10}	(Turkey) Kastamonu Belediyesi	19–31	27–27
GVM Europe-Vác (Hungary)	84–54 ^{11}	(Israel) Maccabi Arazim Ramat Gan	39–27	45–27

Notes

^{1} Both legs were hosted by Metraco Zagłębie Lubin.
^{2} Both legs were hosted by ŽRK Metalurg.
^{3} Both legs were hosted by IUVENTA Michalovce.
^{4} Both legs were hosted by Viborg HK.
^{5} Both legs were hosted by Handball Käerjeng.
^{6} Both legs were hosted by TuS Metzingen.
^{7} Both legs were hosted by KHF Shqiponja.
^{8} Both legs were hosted by Mecalia Atlético Guardés.
^{9} Both legs were hosted by Fredrikstad BK.
^{10} Both legs were hosted by Kastamonu Belediyesi.
^{11} Both legs were hosted by GVM Europe-Vác.
^{12} Order of legs reversed after original draw.

=== Round 2 ===
There were 32 teams participating in round 2. 14 teams who qualified from round 1 and 18 teams joining the draw. The first legs was played on 13–14 October and the second legs was played on 20–21 October 2018. Some teams agreed to play both matches in the same venue.

Team 1	Agg.	Team 2	1st leg	2nd leg
GVM Europe-Vác (Hungary)	48–67	(Hungary) Siófok KC	22–35	26–32
IUVENTA Michalovce (Slovakia)	48–59	(Denmark) Nykøbing Falster Håndbold	26–29	22–29
DHC Slavia Prague (Czech Republic)	45–57 ^{1}	(Romania) CS Măgura Cisnădie	25–28	20–29
Kuban Krasnodar (Russia)	54–42 ^{2}	(Belarus) HC BNTU-BelAZ Minsk	29–22	25–20
Jomi Salerno (Italy)	47–67	(Russia) Zvezda Zvenigorod	22–32	25–35
H 65 Höör (Sweden)	62–51	(Turkey) Muratpaşa BSK	31–25	31–26
Nantes Loire Atlantique Handball (France)	49–49 (a)	(France) Paris 92	31–26	18–23
SPONO Eagles (Switzerland)	35–78	(Hungary) Dunaújvárosi KKA	21–35	14–43
HC Astrakhanochka (Russia)	53–64	(Germany) TuS Metzingen	27–28	26–38
SCM Râmnicu Vâlcea (Romania)	55–47	(Turkey) Kastamonu Belediyesi	35–26	20–21
Viborg HK (Denmark)	59–49	(Germany) Buxtehuder SV	27–24	32–25
Herning-Ikast Håndbold (Denmark)	52–45	(Poland) Metraco Zagłębie Lubin	31–19	21–26
Besançon Feminin (France)	53–49	(Norway) Fredrikstad BK	31–23	22–26
Hypo Niederösterreich (Austria)	44–48	(Spain) Metraco Atlético Guardés	22–20	22–28
Storhamar HE (Norway)	51–34	(Norway) Byåsen Handball Elite	29–20	22–14
HC Zalău (Romania)	45–49	(Germany) Borussia Dortmund Handball	25–25	20–24

Notes

^{1} Both legs were hosted by CS Măgura Cisnădie.
^{2} Both legs were hosted by Kuban Krasnodar.

=== Round 3 ===
A total of 24 teams entered the draw for the third qualification round, which will held on Tuesday, 23 October 2018.

The draw seeding pots were composed as follows:

Pot 1	Pot 2
(Czech Republic) DHK Baník Most; (Denmark) Herning-Ikast Håndbold; (Denmark) Team Esbjerg; (Spain) Mecalia Atlético Guardés; (Spain) BM Bera Bera; (Hungary) Érd HC; (Poland) MKS Lublin; (Romania) SCM Craiova; (Russia) HC Lada; (Russia) Zvezda Zvenigorod; (Serbia) ŽORK Jagodina; (Sweden) H 65 Höör	(Denmark) Nykøbing Falster Håndbold; (Denmark) Viborg HK; (France) Besançon Feminin; (France) Paris 92; (Germany) Borussia Dortmund Handball; (Germany) TuS Metzingen; (Hungary) Dunaújvárosi KKA; (Hungary) Siófok KC; (Norway) Storhamar HE; (Romania) SCM Râmnicu Vâlcea; (Romania) CS Măgura Cisnădie; (Russia) Kuban Krasnodar

The first legs were played on 10–11 November and the second legs were played on 17–18 November 2018.

Team 1	Agg.	Team 2	1st leg	2nd leg
Viborg HK (Denmark)	57–27	(Serbia) ŽORK Jagodina	31–16	26–11
Kuban Krasnodar (Russia)	59–58	(Spain) Mecalia Atlético Guardés	26–27	33–31
Team Esbjerg (Denmark)	60–53	(France) Paris 92	29–28	31–25
HC Lada (Russia)	56–63	(Hungary) Siófok KC	30–26	26–37
DHK Baník Most (Czech Republic)	43–63	(Germany) TuS Metzingen	19–28	24–35
Borussia Dortmund Handball (Germany)	35–38	(Romania) SCM Craiova	17–19	18–19
MKS Lublin (Poland)	50–53	(France) Besançon Feminin	22–22	28–31
Herning-Ikast Håndbold (Denmark)	43–35	(Romania) SCM Râmnicu Vâlcea	22–16	21–19
Érd HC (Hungary)	56–60	(Norway) Storhamar HE	29–28	27–32
Dunaújvárosi KKA (Hungary)	41–48	(Spain) BM Bera Bera	18–26	23–22
Nykøbing Falster Håndbold (Denmark)	54–47	(Sweden) H 65 Höör	27–24	27–23
Zvezda Zvenigorod (Russia)	47–50	(Romania) CS Măgura Cisnădie	29–24	18–26

== Group stage ==
The draw for the group phase was held on Thursday, 22 November 2018. In each group, teams played against each other in a double round-robin format, with home and away matches.

Tiebreakers
In the group stage, teams were ranked according to points (2 points for a win, 1 point for a draw, 0 points for a loss). After completion of the group stage, if two or more teams have scored the same number of points, the ranking will be determined as follows:
1. Highest number of points in matches between the teams directly involved;
2. Superior goal difference in matches between the teams directly involved;
3. Highest number of goals scored in matches between the teams directly involved (or in the away match in case of a two-team tie);
4. Superior goal difference in all matches of the group;
5. Highest number of plus goals in all matches of the group;

If the ranking of one of these teams is determined, the above criteria are consecutively followed until the ranking of all teams is determined. If no ranking can be determined, a decision shall be obtained by EHF through drawing of lots.

During the group stage, only criteria 4–5 apply to determine the provisional ranking of teams.

=== Group A ===
Pos	Team	Pld	W	D	L	GF	GA	GD	Pts	Qualification	ESB	STO	BIE	MAG
1	(Denmark) Team Esbjerg	6	5	1	0	186	139	+47	11	Knockout stage	—	25–20	28–27	41–18
2	(Norway) Storhamar HE	6	3	1	2	156	150	+6	7	Knockout stage	28–28	—	29–28	28–23
3	(Germany) SG BBM Bietigheim	6	3	0	3	173	151	+22	6		27–32	28–25	—	29–17
4	(Romania) CS Măgura Cisnădie	6	0	0	6	115	190	−75	0		19–32	18–26	20–34	—

Source: EHF

=== Group B ===
Pos	Team	Pld	W	D	L	GF	GA	GD	Pts	Qualification	SIO	HER	TUS	SAV
1	(Hungary) Siófok KC	6	6	0	0	188	149	+39	12	Knockout stage	—	25–21	32–25	34–21
2	(Denmark) Herning-Ikast Håndbold	6	4	0	2	164	157	+7	8	Knockout stage	22–34	—	31–28	29–22
3	(Germany) TuS Metzingen	6	2	0	4	172	173	−1	4		26–33	25–28	—	29–22
4	(Sweden) IK Sävehof	6	0	0	6	139	184	−45	0		24−30	23–33	27–29	—

Source: EHF

=== Group C ===
Pos	Team	Pld	W	D	L	GF	GA	GD	Pts	Qualification	VIB	KUB	BES	LAR
1	(Denmark) Viborg HK	6	6	0	0	178	155	+23	12	Knockout stage	—	26–25	35–26	26–23
2	(Russia) Kuban Krasnodar	6	2	1	3	161	158	+3	5	Knockout stage	27–31	—	28–29	32–26
3	(France) Besançon Feminin	6	2	0	4	162	172	−10	4		26–29	23–26	—	32–25
4	(Norway) Larvik HK	6	1	1	4	152	170	−18	3		28–31	23–23	29–26	—

Source: EHF

=== Group D ===
Pos	Team	Pld	W	D	L	GF	GA	GD	Pts	Qualification	POD	NYK	CRA	BER
1	(Croatia) Podravka Koprivnica	6	4	0	2	160	154	+6	8	Knockout stage	—	25–28	23–18	32–29
2	(Denmark) Nykøbing Falster Håndbold	6	3	1	2	151	145	+6	7	Knockout stage	24–28	—	20–20	31–26
3	(Romania) SCM Craiova	6	2	1	3	126	136	−10	5		23–26	18–12	—	26–23
4	(Spain) BM Bera Bera	6	2	0	4	170	172	−2	4		32–26	28–36	32–21	—

Source: EHF

== Knockout stage ==
The draw event was held at the EHF Office in Vienna on Tuesday 12 February 2019. The draw determined the quarter-final and also the semi-final pairings. The country protection rule was not applied in the draw, which means the four Danish teams can face their domestic rivals in the quarter-finals. However, teams from the same group could not meet in the next stage.

=== Quarterfinals ===
==== Seeding ====
Pot 1	Pot 2
(Denmark) Team Esbjerg (Denmark) Viborg HK (Croatia) Podravka Koprivnica (Hungary) Siófok KC	(Denmark) Herning-Ikast Håndbold (Denmark) Nykøbing Falster Håndbold (Norway) Storhamar HE (Russia) Kuban Krasnodar

The first quarter-final leg was scheduled for 2–3 March 2019, while the second leg followed one week later.

Team 1	Agg.	Team 2	1st leg	2nd leg
Storhamar HE (Norway)	55–63	(Hungary) Siófok KC	24–31	31–32
Herning-Ikast Håndbold (Denmark)	52–50	(Croatia) Podravka Koprivnica	34–26	18–24
Kuban Krasnodar (Russia)	55–74	(Denmark) Team Esbjerg	24–37	31–37
Nykøbing Falster Håndbold (Denmark)	39–52	(Denmark) Viborg HK	20–28	19–24

==== Matches ====
3 March 2019; 16:30	Nykøbing Falster Håndbold (Denmark)	20–28	(Denmark) Viborg HK	Næstved Arena, Nykøbing Falster; Attendance: 2,325; Referees: Mitrović, Kažanegra (MNE)
3 March 2019; 16:30	Housheer 6	(11–16)	Nørgaard 9	Næstved Arena, Nykøbing Falster; Attendance: 2,325; Referees: Mitrović, Kažanegra (MNE)
3 March 2019; 16:30	3× (yellow card) 6× (suspension)	Report	1× (yellow card) 3× (suspension)	Næstved Arena, Nykøbing Falster; Attendance: 2,325; Referees: Mitrović, Kažanegra (MNE)

9 March 2019; 14:00	Viborg HK (Denmark)	24–19	(Denmark) Nykøbing Falster Håndbold	Vibocold Arena Viborg, Viborg; Attendance: 1,501; Referees: Hatipoğlu, Şimşek (TUR)
9 March 2019; 14:00	three players four	(13–9)	Kristiansen 4	Vibocold Arena Viborg, Viborg; Attendance: 1,501; Referees: Hatipoğlu, Şimşek (TUR)
9 March 2019; 14:00	3× (yellow card) 3× (suspension)	Report	3× (yellow card) 4× (suspension)	Vibocold Arena Viborg, Viborg; Attendance: 1,501; Referees: Hatipoğlu, Şimşek (TUR)

Viborg HK won 52–39 on aggregate

1 March 2019; 19:00	Herning-Ikast Håndbold (Denmark)	34–26	(Croatia) Podravka Koprivnica	Ikast-Brande Arena, Ikast; Attendance: 1,300; Referees: Lidacka, Lesiak (POL)
1 March 2019; 19:00	Friis 10	(17–12)	Ikhneva 7	Ikast-Brande Arena, Ikast; Attendance: 1,300; Referees: Lidacka, Lesiak (POL)
1 March 2019; 19:00	2× (yellow card) 1× (suspension)	Report	3× (yellow card) 2× (suspension)	Ikast-Brande Arena, Ikast; Attendance: 1,300; Referees: Lidacka, Lesiak (POL)

10 March 2019; 17:00	Podravka Koprivnica (Croatia)	24–18	(Denmark) Herning-Ikast Håndbold	Gimnazija "Fran Galović", Koprivnica; Attendance: 2,000; Referees: Bolic, Hurich (AUT)
10 March 2019; 17:00	Chigirinova 7	(12–6)	Friis 5	Gimnazija "Fran Galović", Koprivnica; Attendance: 2,000; Referees: Bolic, Hurich (AUT)
10 March 2019; 17:00	2× (yellow card) 2× (suspension)	Report	2× (yellow card) 5× (suspension)	Gimnazija "Fran Galović", Koprivnica; Attendance: 2,000; Referees: Bolic, Hurich (AUT)

Herning-Ikast Håndbold won 52–50 on aggregate

3 March 2019; 16:00	Kuban Krasnodar (Russia)	24–37	(Denmark) Team Esbjerg	Olympus Arena, Krasnodar; Attendance: 2,000; Referees: Pech, Vagvölgyi (HUN)
3 March 2019; 16:00	Golub 7	(15–14)	Ingstad, Polman 8	Olympus Arena, Krasnodar; Attendance: 2,000; Referees: Pech, Vagvölgyi (HUN)
3 March 2019; 16:00	1× (yellow card) 4× (suspension)	Report	2× (yellow card) 3× (suspension)	Olympus Arena, Krasnodar; Attendance: 2,000; Referees: Pech, Vagvölgyi (HUN)

10 March 2019; 13:00	Team Esbjerg (Denmark)	37–31	(Russia) Kuban Krasnodar	Blue Water Dokken, Esbjerg; Attendance: 1,348; Referees: Simone, Monitillo (ITA)
10 March 2019; 13:00	Breistøl, Liščević 7	(21–20)	Dudina 9	Blue Water Dokken, Esbjerg; Attendance: 1,348; Referees: Simone, Monitillo (ITA)
10 March 2019; 13:00	2× (yellow card) 4× (suspension)	Report	2× (yellow card) 5× (suspension)	Blue Water Dokken, Esbjerg; Attendance: 1,348; Referees: Simone, Monitillo (ITA)

Team Esbjerg won 74–55 on aggregate

3 March 2019; 18:00	Storhamar HE (Norway)	24–31	(Hungary) Siófok KC	Boligpartner Arena, Hamar; Attendance: 1,151; Referees: Sa, Sa (POR)
3 March 2019; 18:00	Riegelhuth	(12–13)	Kobetić	Boligpartner Arena, Hamar; Attendance: 1,151; Referees: Sa, Sa (POR)
3 March 2019; 18:00	3× (yellow card) 1× (suspension)	Report	2× (yellow card) 3× (suspension)	Boligpartner Arena, Hamar; Attendance: 1,151; Referees: Sa, Sa (POR)

10 March 2019; 17:00	Siófok KC (Hungary)	32–31	(Norway) Storhamar HE	Kiss Szilárd Sportcsarnok, Siófok; Attendance: 1,200; Referees: Praštalo, Balvan (BIH)
10 March 2019; 17:00	Minko 8	(23–15)	Folkvord 8	Kiss Szilárd Sportcsarnok, Siófok; Attendance: 1,200; Referees: Praštalo, Balvan (BIH)
10 March 2019; 17:00	3× (yellow card)	Report	3× (yellow card) 2× (suspension)	Kiss Szilárd Sportcsarnok, Siófok; Attendance: 1,200; Referees: Praštalo, Balvan (BIH)

Siófok KC won 63–55 on aggregate

=== Semifinals ===
The semi-finals first legs were played on 6–7 April 2019, while the second leg was scheduled for 13–14 April 2019.

Team 1	Agg.	Team 2	1st leg	2nd leg
Siófok KC (Hungary)	53–51	(Denmark) Viborg HK	28–24	25–27
Herning-Ikast Håndbold (Denmark)	36–53	(Denmark) Team Esbjerg	20–23	16–30

==== Matches ====
6 April 2019; 17:00	Siófok KC (Hungary)	28–24	(Denmark) Viborg HK	Kiss Szilárd Sportcsarnok, Siófok; Attendance: 1,200; Referees: Rakytina, Tkachuk (UKR)
6 April 2019; 17:00	Kobetić 7	(15–13)	Högdahl 6	Kiss Szilárd Sportcsarnok, Siófok; Attendance: 1,200; Referees: Rakytina, Tkachuk (UKR)
6 April 2019; 17:00	4× (yellow card) 2× (suspension)	Report	3× (yellow card) 6× (suspension)	Kiss Szilárd Sportcsarnok, Siófok; Attendance: 1,200; Referees: Rakytina, Tkachuk (UKR)

14 April 2019; 14:00	Viborg HK (Denmark)	27–25	(Hungary) Siófok KC	Vibocold Arena Viborg, Viborg; Attendance: 1,431; Referees: Lončar, Lončar (CRO)
14 April 2019; 14:00	Nørgaard 5	(12–11)	Kobetić 8	Vibocold Arena Viborg, Viborg; Attendance: 1,431; Referees: Lončar, Lončar (CRO)
14 April 2019; 14:00	2× (yellow card) 2× (suspension)	Report	3× (yellow card) 2× (suspension)	Vibocold Arena Viborg, Viborg; Attendance: 1,431; Referees: Lončar, Lončar (CRO)

Siófok KC won 53–51 on aggregate

6 April 2019; 17:00	Herning-Ikast Håndbold (Denmark)	20–23	(Denmark) Team Esbjerg	Ikast-Brande Arena, Ikast; Attendance: 986; Referees: Sa, Sa (POR)
6 April 2019; 17:00	Fauske 4	(10–12)	Polman 8	Ikast-Brande Arena, Ikast; Attendance: 986; Referees: Sa, Sa (POR)
6 April 2019; 17:00	3× (yellow card) 5× (suspension)	Report	2× (yellow card) 3× (suspension)	Ikast-Brande Arena, Ikast; Attendance: 986; Referees: Sa, Sa (POR)

14 April 2019; 13:00	Team Esbjerg (Denmark)	30–16	(Denmark) Herning-Ikast Håndbold	Blue Water Dokken, Esbjerg; Attendance: 1,530; Referees: Ben-Dan, Faran (ISR)
14 April 2019; 13:00	Liščević 8	(20–8)	Fauske 4	Blue Water Dokken, Esbjerg; Attendance: 1,530; Referees: Ben-Dan, Faran (ISR)
14 April 2019; 13:00	3× (yellow card) 3× (suspension)	Report	3× (yellow card) 3× (suspension)	Blue Water Dokken, Esbjerg; Attendance: 1,530; Referees: Ben-Dan, Faran (ISR)

Team Esbjerg won 53–36 on aggregate

=== Final ===
The first leg was played on 4–5 May and the second legs was played on 11–12 May 2019. The final home rights draw was held on 16 April in Vienna.

Team 1	Agg.	Team 2	1st leg	2nd leg
Team Esbjerg (Denmark)	42–47	(Hungary) Siófok KC	21–21	21–26

==== Matches ====
5 May 2019; 15:00	Team Esbjerg (Denmark)	21–21	(Hungary) Siófok KC	Blue Water Dokken, Esbjerg; Attendance: 2,556; Referees: Bolic, Hurich (AUT)
5 May 2019; 15:00	Solberg 6	(12–10)	Kobetić 6	Blue Water Dokken, Esbjerg; Attendance: 2,556; Referees: Bolic, Hurich (AUT)
5 May 2019; 15:00	3× (yellow card) 3× (suspension)	Report	3× (yellow card) 5× (suspension)	Blue Water Dokken, Esbjerg; Attendance: 2,556; Referees: Bolic, Hurich (AUT)

11 May 2019; 20:30	Siófok KC (Hungary)	26–21	(Denmark) Team Esbjerg	Kiss Szilárd Sportcsarnok, Siófok; Attendance: 1,200; Referees: Opava, Valek (CZE)
11 May 2019; 20:30	Minko 7	(14–10)	Liščević, Polman 6	Kiss Szilárd Sportcsarnok, Siófok; Attendance: 1,200; Referees: Opava, Valek (CZE)
11 May 2019; 20:30	3× (yellow card) 4× (suspension)	Report	3× (yellow card) 4× (suspension)	Kiss Szilárd Sportcsarnok, Siófok; Attendance: 1,200; Referees: Opava, Valek (CZE)

Siófok KC won 47–42 on aggregate

== Top goalscorers ==
Rank	Player	Club	Goals
1	(Croatia) Andrea Kobetić	(Hungary) Siófok KC	75
2	(Norway) Helene Gigstad Fauske	(Denmark) Herning-Ikast Håndbold	70
3	(France) Estelle Nze Minko	(Hungary) Siófok KC	65
4	(Netherlands) Estavana Polman	(Denmark) Team Esbjerg	61
5	(Norway) Betina Riegelhuth	(Norway) Storhamar HE	55
6	(Serbia) Kristina Liščević	(Denmark) Team Esbjerg	54
6	(Denmark) Ann Grete Nørgaard	(Denmark) Viborg HK	54
8	(Russia) Diana Golub	(Russia) HC Kuban Krasnodar	50
9	(Spain) Mireya González	(Hungary) Siófok KC	48
10	(Denmark) Simone Böhme	(Hungary) Siófok KC	45

== See also ==
- 2018–19 Women's EHF Champions League
- 2018-19 Women's EHF Challenge Cup
