= 2018–19 Women's EHF Champions League qualifying =

This article describes the qualifying of the 2018–19 Women's EHF Champions League.

== Draw ==
The draw was held on 27 June 2018 in Vienna, Austria. The eight teams were split in two groups and played a semifinal and final to determine the last participants. Matches were played on 8 and 9 September 2018. The matches from each tournament were played in one venue with two semi-finals, where teams from Pot 4 met teams from Pot 1 and teams from Pot 3 will faced teams from Pot 2, followed by finals. The right to organize the qualification tournaments was also drawn.

=== Seedings ===
The seedings were announced on 20 June 2018.

Pot 1	Pot 2	Pot 3	Pot 4
(Romania) SCM Craiova (Germany) SG BBM Bietigheim	(Poland) MKS Lublin (Croatia) Podravka Koprivnica	(Italy) Jomi Salerno (Turkey) Muratpaşa BSK	(Spain) BM Bera Bera (Serbia) ŽORK Jagodina

== Qualification tournament 1 ==
MKS Lublin hosted the tournament.

=== Bracket ===
Semifinals
8 September
(Germany) SG BBM Bietigheim	33
(Spain) BM Bera Bera	27
8 September
(Poland) MKS Lublin	28
(Italy) Jomi Salerno	17

Final
9 September
(Germany) SG BBM Bietigheim	34
(Poland) MKS Lublin	19
Third place
9 September
(Spain) BM Bera Bera	40
(Italy) Jomi Salerno	20

=== Semifinals ===
8 September 2018; 16:00	SG BBM Bietigheim (Germany)	33–27	(Spain) BM Bera Bera	Hala Sportowo-Widowiskowa "Globus", Lublin; Attendance: 607; Referees: Opava, Válek (CZE)
8 September 2018; 16:00	Loerper 6	(17–15)	Karsten 8	Hala Sportowo-Widowiskowa "Globus", Lublin; Attendance: 607; Referees: Opava, Válek (CZE)
8 September 2018; 16:00	1× (yellow card) 3× (suspension)	Report	3× (yellow card) 2× (suspension)	Hala Sportowo-Widowiskowa "Globus", Lublin; Attendance: 607; Referees: Opava, Válek (CZE)

8 September 2018; 19:00	MKS Lublin (Poland)	28–17	(Italy) Jomi Salerno	Hala Sportowo-Widowiskowa "Globus", Lublin; Attendance: 1,950; Referees: Stark, Ştefan (ROU)
8 September 2018; 19:00	Rosiak 6	(15–7)	Gómez 7	Hala Sportowo-Widowiskowa "Globus", Lublin; Attendance: 1,950; Referees: Stark, Ştefan (ROU)
8 September 2018; 19:00	2× (yellow card) 2× (suspension)	Report	3× (yellow card) 5× (suspension)	Hala Sportowo-Widowiskowa "Globus", Lublin; Attendance: 1,950; Referees: Stark, Ştefan (ROU)

=== Third place game ===
9 September 2018; 16:00	BM Bera Bera (Spain)	40–20	(Italy) Jomi Salerno	Hala Sportowo-Widowiskowa "Globus", Lublin; Attendance: 463; Referees: Stark, Ştefan (ROU)
9 September 2018; 16:00	Da Silva 13	(17–8)	Gómez 7	Hala Sportowo-Widowiskowa "Globus", Lublin; Attendance: 463; Referees: Stark, Ştefan (ROU)
9 September 2018; 16:00	3× (yellow card) 4× (suspension)	Report	2× (yellow card) 2× (suspension)	Hala Sportowo-Widowiskowa "Globus", Lublin; Attendance: 463; Referees: Stark, Ştefan (ROU)

=== Final ===
9 September 2018; 19:00	SG BBM Bietigheim (Germany)	34–19	(Poland) MKS Lublin	Hala Sportowo-Widowiskowa "Globus", Lublin; Attendance: 2,950; Referees: Opava, Válek (CZE)
9 September 2018; 19:00	Visser 9	(20–11)	Rosiak 5	Hala Sportowo-Widowiskowa "Globus", Lublin; Attendance: 2,950; Referees: Opava, Válek (CZE)
9 September 2018; 19:00	3× (yellow card) 3× (suspension)	Report	4× (yellow card) 3× (suspension)	Hala Sportowo-Widowiskowa "Globus", Lublin; Attendance: 2,950; Referees: Opava, Válek (CZE)

== Qualification tournament 2 ==
Podravka Koprivnica hosted the tournament.

=== Bracket ===
Semifinals
8 September
(Romania) SCM Craiova	31
(Serbia) ŽORK Jagodina	18
8 September
(Croatia) Podravka Koprivnica	35
(Turkey) Muratpaşa BSK	22

Final
9 September
(Romania) SCM Craiova	21
(Croatia) Podravka Koprivnica	22
Third place
9 September
(Serbia) ŽORK Jagodina	26
(Turkey) Muratpaşa BSK	24

=== Semifinals ===
8 September 2018; 16:30	SCM Craiova (Romania)	31–18	(Serbia) ŽORK Jagodina	Sport Hall Fran Galović, Koprivnica; Attendance: 220; Referees: Pech, Vagvölgyi (HUN)
8 September 2018; 16:30	Trifunović 8	(19–10)	Mitrović 5	Sport Hall Fran Galović, Koprivnica; Attendance: 220; Referees: Pech, Vagvölgyi (HUN)
8 September 2018; 16:30	3× (yellow card) 3× (suspension)	Report	2× (yellow card) 1× (suspension)	Sport Hall Fran Galović, Koprivnica; Attendance: 220; Referees: Pech, Vagvölgyi (HUN)

8 September 2018; 19:30	Podravka Koprivnica (Croatia)	35–22	(Turkey) Muratpaşa BSK	Sport Hall Fran Galović, Koprivnica; Attendance: 1,570; Referees: Vešović, Mitrović (MNE)
8 September 2018; 19:30	Chigirinova 6	(18–12)	Kiliç 6	Sport Hall Fran Galović, Koprivnica; Attendance: 1,570; Referees: Vešović, Mitrović (MNE)
8 September 2018; 19:30	3× (yellow card) 4× (suspension) 1× (red card)	Report	3× (yellow card) 4× (suspension)	Sport Hall Fran Galović, Koprivnica; Attendance: 1,570; Referees: Vešović, Mitrović (MNE)

=== Third place game ===
9 September 2018; 15:00	ŽORK Jagodina (Serbia)	26–24	(Turkey) Muratpaşa BSK	Sport Hall Fran Galović, Koprivnica; Attendance: 120; Referees: Pech, Vagvölgyi (HUN)
9 September 2018; 15:00	Gojković 9	(15–12)	Şahin, Türkyılmaz 6	Sport Hall Fran Galović, Koprivnica; Attendance: 120; Referees: Pech, Vagvölgyi (HUN)
9 September 2018; 15:00	3× (yellow card) 5× (suspension)	Report	3× (yellow card) 2× (suspension)	Sport Hall Fran Galović, Koprivnica; Attendance: 120; Referees: Pech, Vagvölgyi (HUN)

=== Final ===
9 September 2018; 18:00	SCM Craiova (Romania)	21–22	(Croatia) Podravka Koprivnica	Sport Hall Fran Galović, Koprivnica; Attendance: 2,200; Referees: Vešović, Mitrović (MNE)
9 September 2018; 18:00	Trifunović 6	(14–12)	Chigirinova 7	Sport Hall Fran Galović, Koprivnica; Attendance: 2,200; Referees: Vešović, Mitrović (MNE)
9 September 2018; 18:00	4× (yellow card) 3× (suspension)	Report	3× (yellow card) 3× (suspension)	Sport Hall Fran Galović, Koprivnica; Attendance: 2,200; Referees: Vešović, Mitrović (MNE)
