= Riegelhuth =

Riegelhuth is a surname. Notable people with the surname include:

- Betina Riegelhuth (born 1987), Norwegian handball player
- Einar Riegelhuth Koren (born 1984), Norwegian handball player
- Linn-Kristin Riegelhuth Koren (born 1984), Norwegian handball player
