= Jenny Karolius =

German handball player (born 1986)

Personal information
- Nationality: German
- Born: 24 May 1986 (age 40) Berlin, Germany
- Height: 1.81 m (5 ft 11 in)

Sport
- Sport: Handball
- Position: Pivot
- Current club: Retired

Senior clubs
- Years: Team
- 1995–2003: Post SV Berlin
- 2003–2005: BVG Berlin
- 2005–2009: SC Markranstädt
- 2009–2011: SG BBM Bietigheim
- 2011–2014: Frisch Auf Göppingen
- 2014–2019: Bayer Leverkusen
National team
Years	Team	Apps	(Gls)
2016–2017	Germany	22	(36)

Jenny Karolius (born 24 May 1986) is a retired German handball player who most recently played for Bayer Leverkusen and the German national team.

She was part of the team at the 2016 European Women's Handball Championship.
