= Frank Dehne =

German volleyball player (born 1976)

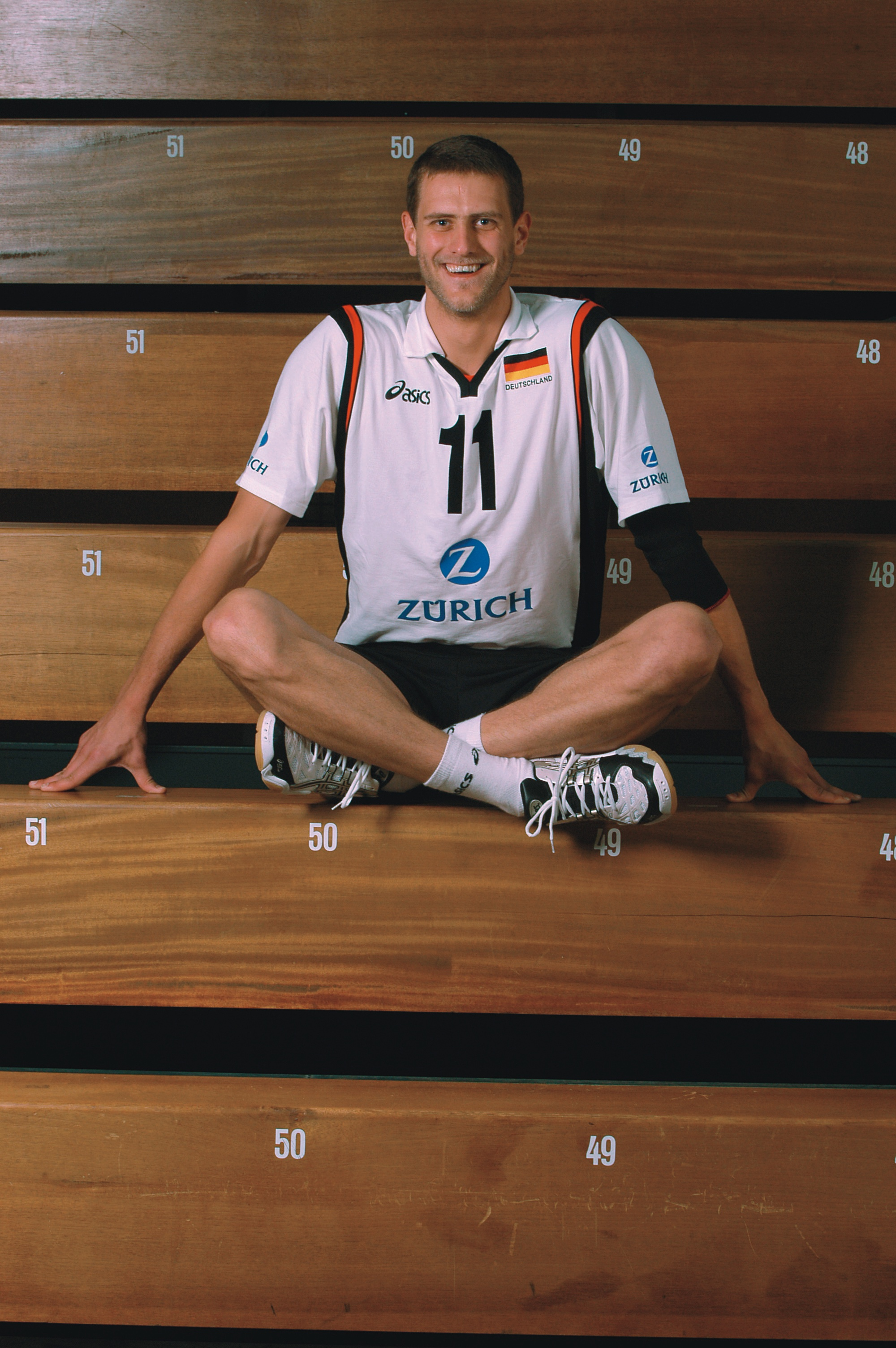
- A colour image of Frank Dehne sitting against a wooden background

Personal information
- Full name: Frank Dehne
- Born: 14 February 1976 (age 50); Berlin, Germany
- Height: 2.02 m (6 ft 8 in)

Volleyball information
- Position: Settler
- Current club: Galatasaray
- Number: 11

Career
Years	Teams
1985–1994; 1994–1997; 1997–2003; 2003–2004; 2004–2005; 2005–2006; 2006–2007; 2007; 2007–2008; 2008–2009; 2009–present	SG Rupenhorn; Post SV Berlin; SC Charlottenburg Berlin; Rennes Etudiants; Volley Lube; Codyeco St. Croce; Tonno Calipo Valentina; Famigliulo Corigliano; Mlekpol AZS Olsztyn; Marmi Lanza Verona; Galatasaray

National team
1997-present	Germany

Frank Dehne (born 14 February 1976 in Berlin) is a volleyball player from Germany, who plays for the National Team. He is nicknamed "Döner" and played as a setter for Galatasaray.
