= Dragana Petkovska =

Macedonian handball player

Personal information
- Nationality: North Macedonia
- Born: 12 June 1996 (age 30) Skopje, Macedonia
- Height: 1.74 m (5 ft 9 in)

Sport
- Sport: Handball
- Position: Goalkeeper
- Current club: PDO Handball Team Salerno
- Number: 1

Senior clubs
- Years: Team
- 2014–2016: ŽRK Vardar
- 2016–2017: ŽRK Vardar SCJS
- 2017–2018: Ardeşen GSK
- 2018: Silkeborg-Voel KFUM
- 2018–2020: SønderjyskE
- 2021–2022: ŽORK Jagodina
- 2022–2023: Maccabi Rishon LeZion
- 2023–2024: AEK Athens
- 2024–: PDO Handball Team Salerno
National team
Years	Team	Apps	(Gls)
2018–	North Macedonia	7	(0)

Dragana Petkovska (Macedonian: Драгана Петковска) (born 12 June 1996) is a Macedonian handball player who plays for PDO Handball Team Salerno and the North Macedonia national handball team.
