= Barbara Bagócsi =

Hungarian handball player (born 1988)

Personal information
- Full name: Barbara Bagócsi
- Nationality: Hungarian
- Born: 18 May 1988 (age 38) Budapest, Hungary
- Height: 1.76 m (5 ft 9 in)

Sport
- Sport: Handball
- Position: Middle Back
- Current club: Retired

Senior clubs
- Years: Team
- –2005: Ferencvárosi TC
- 2005–2010: Váci NKSE
- 2010: Újbuda TC
- 2010–2011: Vigasio
- 2011–2014: SG BBM Bietigheim

Barbara Bagócsi (born 18 May 1988) is a retired Hungarian handball player.
