= Tomáš Hlavatý =

Slovak handball player and coach

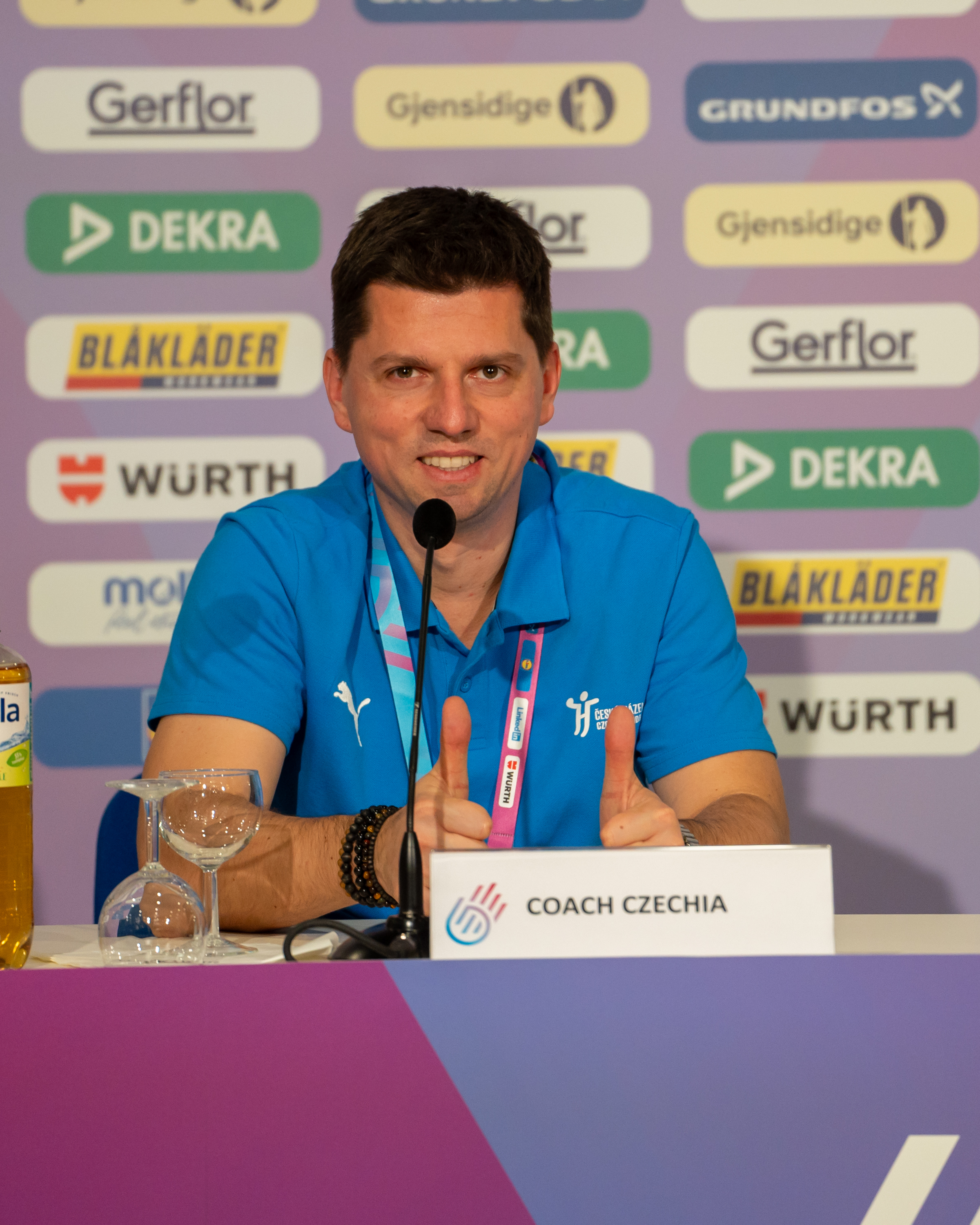

Personal information
- Nationality: Slovak
- Born: 30 December 1987 (age 38)

Sport
- Sport: Handball
- Current club: Czech Republic (national team)

Teams managed
- Years: Team
- 2018–2019: Rostov-Don (assistant)
- 2020–2022: Russia (assistant)
- 2021–2022: Rostov-Don
- 2022–2023: Vipers Kristiansand (assistant)
- 2023–2025: Vipers Kristiansand
- 2025–: Czech Republic
- 2025: HB Ludwigsburg
- 2026–: Brest Bretagne Handball

Tomáš Hlavatý (born 30 December 1987) is a Slovak handball coach and former player. From 2025, he is the head of the Czech Republic national handball team.

Hlavatý has been coaching several teams in different roles during his coaching career, including the Russian national team as the assistant coach of Liudmila Bodnieva. He has also served as both assistant and head coach of the Russian top-tier Rostov-Don from 2018 to 2022. In 2022 he joined the staff of Vipers Kristiansand and was later appointed head coach for the 2023/24 season.

Following the bankruptcy filing of Vipers Kristiansand, Hlavatý was appointed as the new national coach of the Czech Republic in February 2025. The very same month, Hlavatý was also set to take over HB Ludwigsburg for the 2025/26 season.

== Personal life ==
Hlavatý is also the partner of former Czech handball international Jana Knedlíková, whom he also coached in Vipers Kristiansand.
