= Mille Hundahl =

Danish handball player (born 1990)

Personal information
- Full name: Mille Heick Hundahl
- Nationality: Danish
- Born: 21 September 1990 (age 36) Thisted, Denmark
- Height: 168 cm (66 in)

Sport
- Sport: Handball
- Position: Right wing
- Current club: Mejdal/Halgård

Youth career
- Years: Team
- –: Thisted
- –: HH90
- –: Team Tvis Holstebro

Senior clubs
- Years: Team
- 2009–2011: TTH Holstebro
- 2011–2013: Skive fH
- 2013–2014: TTH Holstebro
- 2014–2015: Ringkøbing Håndbold
- 2015–2018: SG BBM Bietigheim (Germany)
- 2018–2019: Molde Elite (Norway)
- 2020-2021: Ringkøbing Håndbold
- 2022-2023: Mejdal/Halgård

Mille Heick Hundahl (born 21 September 1990) is a Danish female handballer who currently plays for the Danish 3. division club Mejdal/Halgård. She has previously played for Team Tvis Holstebro, Skive fH and Ringkøbing Håndbold in Denmark, SG BBM Bietigheim in Germany and Molde HK in Norway.

== International honours ==
- EHF Cup:
  - Finalist: 2011, 2017
