= Valentina Klemenčič =

Slovenian handball player

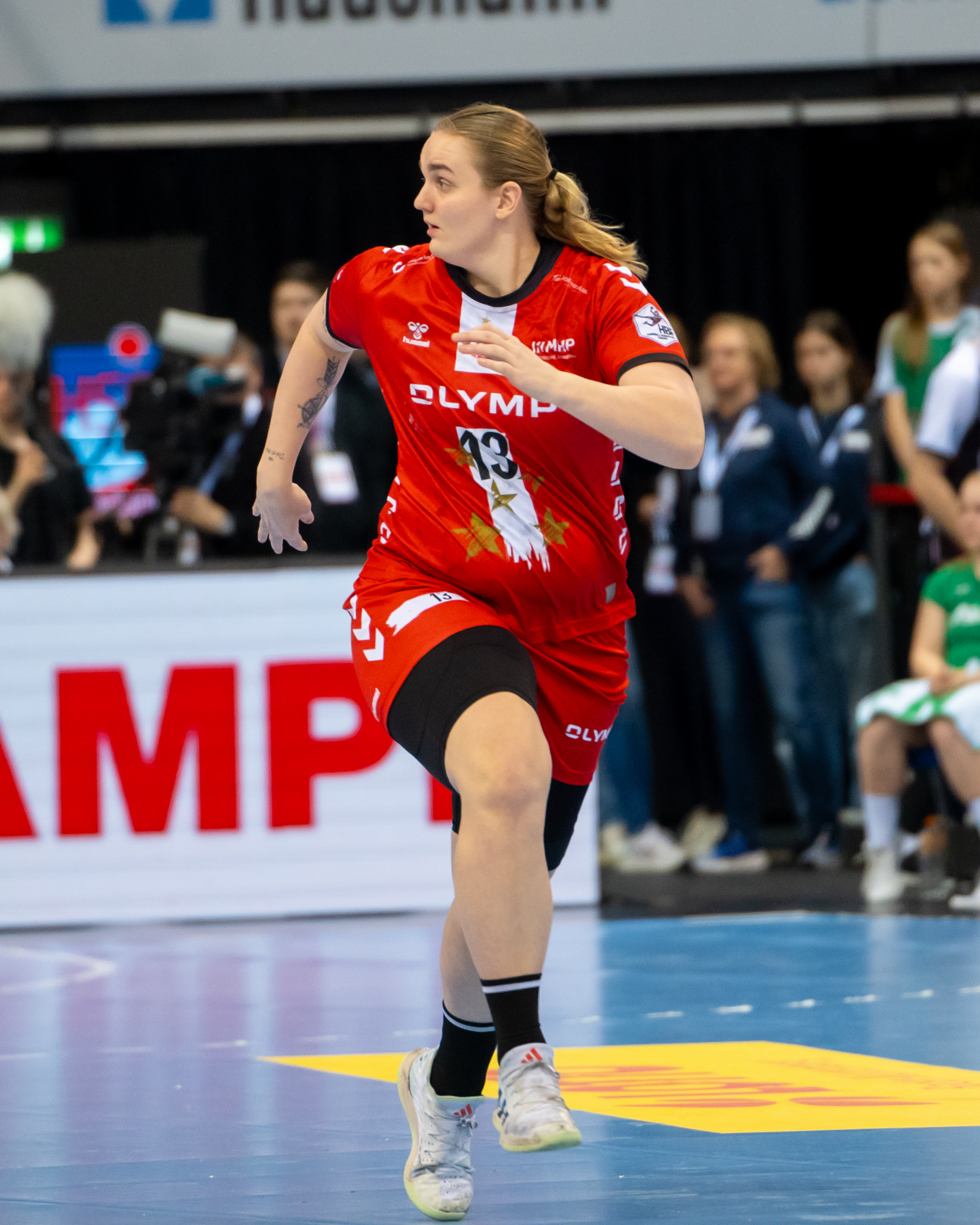
- Klemenčič in 2025

Personal information
- Nationality: Slovenian
- Born: 5 February 2002 (age 24) Kranj, Slovenia
- Height: 1.85 m (6 ft 1 in)

Sport
- Sport: Handball
- Position: Pivot
- Current club: ŽRK Crvena Zvezda
- Number: 13

Youth career
- Years: Team
- –: RK Naklo

Senior clubs
- Years: Team
- -2024: RK Krim
- 2024-2025: HB Ludwigsburg
- 2025-: ŽRK Crvena Zvezda
National team
Years	Team	Apps	(Gls)
2019–	Slovenia	45	(57)
- Updated on 2 August 2024

Valentina Klemenčič (born 5 February 2002) is a Slovenian handball player for ŽRK Crvena Zvezda and the Slovenian national team.

== Career ==
Klemenčič Starated playing handball at RK Naklo and joined Slovenian top club RK Krim at the age of 16. Here she won the Slovenian championship 5 times and the Slovenian cup twice.

In 2024 she joined German side HB Ludwigsburg. Here she won the 2024 DHB-Pokal Frauen.

=== National team ===
She debuted for the Slovenian national team at the age of 17.

Her first major international tournament was the 2019 World Women's Handball Championship. She later represented Slovenia at the 2020 and 2022 European Championships, 2023 World Championship and 2024 Olympics.
