= Jana Knedlíková =

Czech handball player

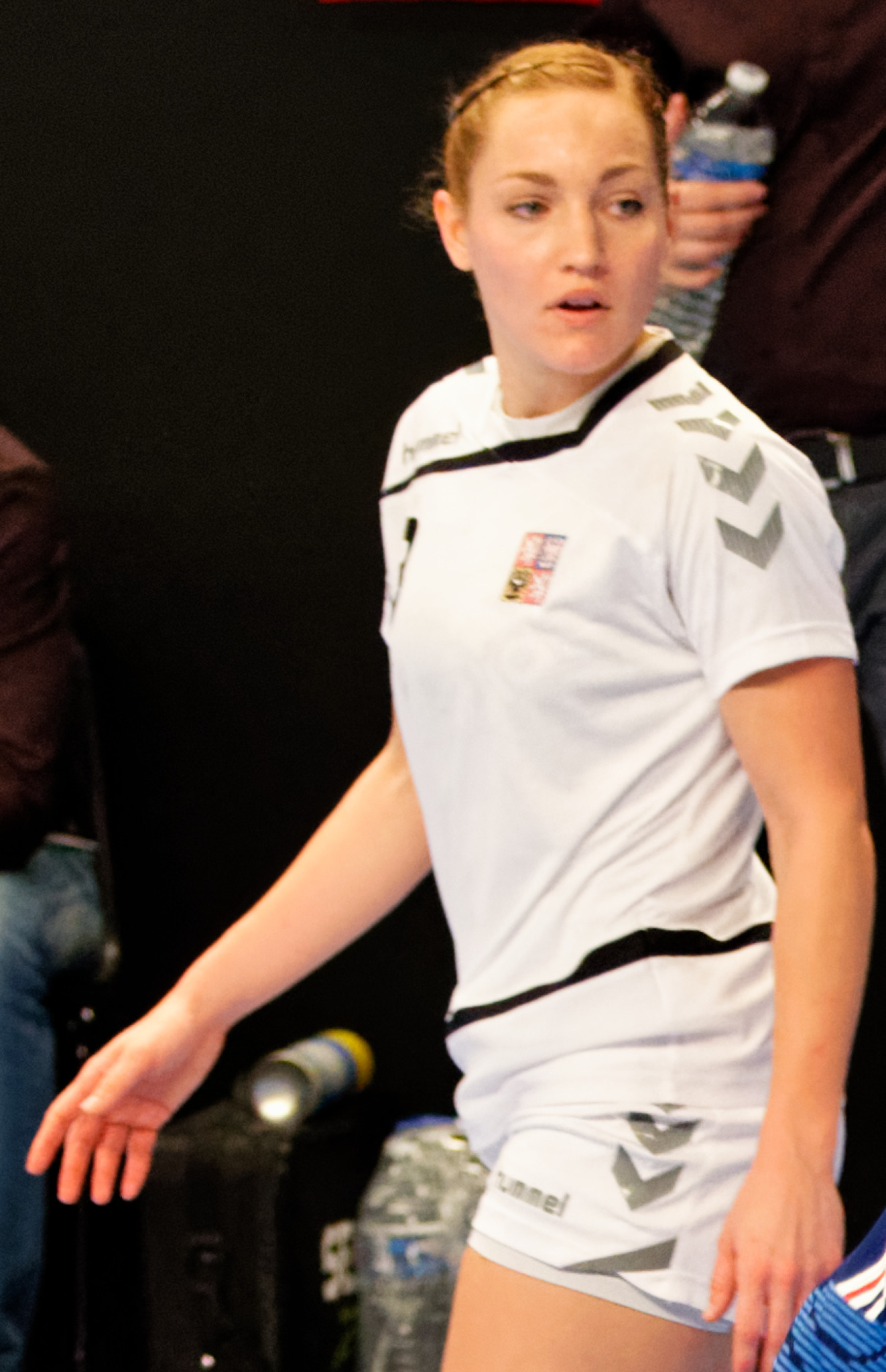

Personal information
- Nationality: Czech
- Born: 22 June 1989 (age 37) Prague, Czechoslovakia
- Height: 1.68 m (5 ft 6 in)

Sport
- Sport: Handball
- Position: Right wing
- Current club: Retired

Senior clubs
- Years: Team
- 2007–2014: DHC Slavia Prague
- 2014–2015: Mosonmagyaróvári KC SE
- 2015: → Győri ETO KC (loan)
- 2015–2020: Győri ETO KC
- 2020–01/2025: Vipers Kristiansand
- 02/2025–06/2025: DHC Slavia Prague
National team
Years	Team	Apps	(Gls)
2008–2022	Czech Republic	124	(265)

Jana Knedlíková (born 22 June 1989) is a former Czech handball player, who last played for DHC Slavia Prague and formerly the Czech national team, retired from the national team in 2022.

She participated at the 2018 European Women's Handball Championship.

== Achievements ==
- EHF Champions League:
  - Winner: 2017, 2018, 2019, 2021, 2022, 2023
  - Finalist: 2016
- Women Handball International League:
  - Winner: 2010, 2011
- Czech First Division:
  - Winner: 2010
- Hungarian Championship:
  - Winner: 2016, 2017, 2018, 2019
- Hungarian Cup:
  - Winner: 2015, 2016, 2018, 2019
- Norwegian League:
  - Winner: 2020/21, 2021/22, 2022/23, 2023/24
- Norwegian Cup:
  - Winner: 2020, 2021, 22/23, 23/24

== Individual awards ==
- All-Star Right Wing of REMA 1000-ligaen: 2022/2023

== Personal life ==
Her partner is the Slovak handball manager and coach Tomáš Hlavatý.
