= Cecilie Woller =

Danish handball player (born 1992)

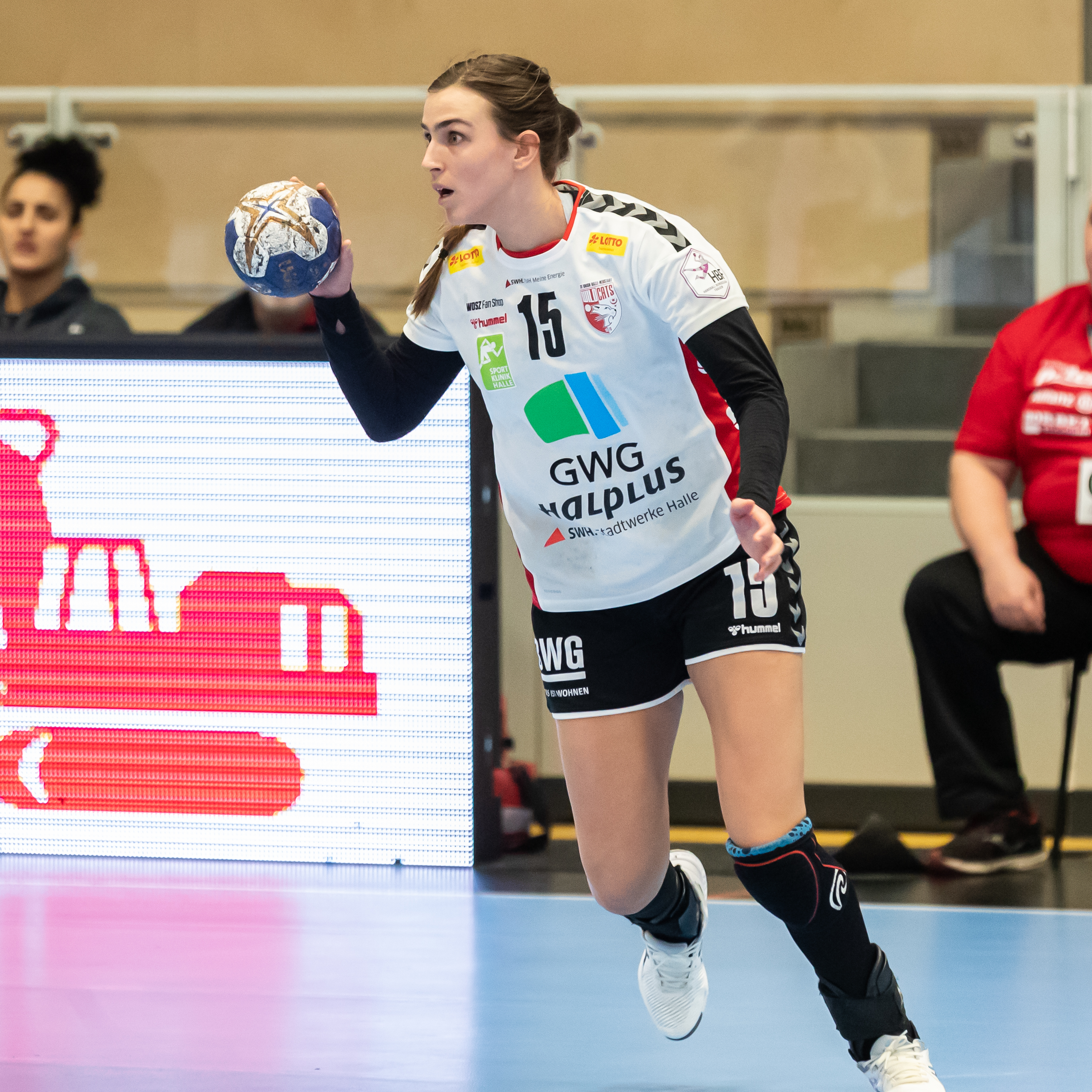

Personal information
- Full name: Cecilie Woller
- Nationality: Danish
- Born: 17 September 1992 (age 34) Herning, Denmark
- Height: 1.80 m (5 ft 11 in)

Sport
- Sport: Handball
- Position: Left Back
- Current club: PDO Handball Team Salerno
- Number: 15

Senior clubs
- Years: Team
- 2009-2012: FC Midtjylland
- 2012-2015: Nykøbing Falster
- 2015-2017: Ajax København
- 2017-2018: SG BBM Bietigheim
- 2018-2020: Ajax København
- 2020-2024: SV Union Halle-Neustadt
- 2024–: Jomi Salerno
Medal record
Youth Olympic Games
Gold medal – first place	2010 Singapore

Cecilie Woller (born 17 September 1992) is a Danish handball player who currently plays for PDO Handball Team Salerno in Italy.

She is the twin sister of fellow handballer Fie Woller.
