= PDO Handball Team Salerno =

Italian women's handball team

- Full name: PDO Handball Team Salerno
- Founded: 2005
- Arena: Pala Palumbo
- Capacity: 500
- Head coach: Thierry Vincent
- League: Serie A
- 2023-24: 3rd
- Club colours
Home	Away

PDO Handball Team Salerno, also known as Jomi Salerno due to sponsorship reasons, is a women's handball club from Salerno in Italia. Jomi Salerno competes in the Serie A.

They are currently competing in the 2024–25 Women's EHF European Cup.

Location of Jomi Salerno

== Honours ==
- Serie A
  - Winners (9) : 2010, 2011, 2013, 2014, 2017, 2018, 2019, 2021, 2023, 2025
- Coppa Italia
  - Winners (6) : 2009, 2012, 2013, 2014, 2019, 2020
- Supercoppe Italiane
  - Winners (8) : 2012, 2013, 2018, 2019, 2021, 2022, 2023, 2024

== European record ==
Season	Competition	Round	Club	Home	Away	Aggregate
2016–17	Challenge Cup	R3	(Iceland) Haukar	19–23	22–27	41–50
2017–18	EHF Cup	R1	(France) Cercle Dijon Bourgogne	22–24	18–27	40–51
2018-19	Champions League	Qual. Tournament / SF	(Poland) MKS Lublin	17–28		
2018-19	Champions League	Qual. Tournament / 3rd	(Spain) BM Bera Bera	20–40		
2018–19	EHF Cup	R2	(Russia) Zvezda Zvenigorod	22–32	25–35	47–67
2019–20	EHF Cup	R1	(Romania) SCM Craiova	17–29	21–30	38–59

== Team ==
=== Current squad ===
Squad for the 2024–25 season

Goalkeepers

- 1 (Italy) Giulia Nappa
- 12 (North Macedonia) Dragana Petkovska
- 16 (Italy) Margherita Danti

Wingers
RW

- 5 (Italy) Margherita Lepori
- 6 (Italy) Giulia Rossomando

LW

- 47 (Uruguay) Martina Barreiro Guerra
- 19 (Italy) Olga Lanfredi
- 18 (Italy) Giuseppa Napoletano

Line Players

- 9 (Italy) Rocio Sthefani Squizziato
- 66 (Italy) Aurora Gislimberti

Back players
LB

- 4 (Italy) Ilaria Dalla Costa
- 10 (Italy) Martina de Santis
- 11 (Italy) Antonia Fabbo
- 64 (Italy) Nathalie Falser

CB

- 2 (Italy) Giorgia Adinolfi
- 15 (Denmark) Cecilie Woller

RB

- 3 (Italy) Asia Kristel Mangone
- 24 (Italy) Cyrielle Lauretti Matos

=== Technical staff ===
- Head coach: (France) Thierry Vincent
- Assistant coach: (Italy) Giuseppa Napoletano
- Team Manager: (Italy) Domenico Testa
- Goalkeeping coach: (Italy) Adele De Santis
- Physiotherapist: (Italy) Salvatore Telese
- Doctor: (Italy) Raffaele Gallo

=== Transfers ===
Transfers for the 2025–26 season

Joining

Leaving
