= Ada Moldovan =

Romanian handball player (born 1983)

Personal information
- Full name: Ada Emilia Moldovan
- Nationality: Romanian
- Born: 15 November 1983 (age 42) Focşani, Romania
- Height: 1.75 m (5 ft 9 in)

Sport
- Sport: Handball
- Position: Right back
- Current club: Gloria Buzău

Senior clubs
- Years: Team
- 2002–2004: CSM Sebeș
- 2004–2008: HCM Roman
- 2008–2016: Dunărea Brăila
- 2016–2020: Măgura Cisnădie
- 2020–: Gloria Buzău
National team
Years	Team	Apps	(Gls)
2008–2010	Romania	53	(75)
Medal record
European Championship
Bronze medal – third place	2010 Denmark & Norway	Team

Ada Emilia Moldovan (née Bahamet; born 15 November 1983) is a Romanian handball player who plays for Gloria Buzău. She participated at the 2008 Summer Olympics in China with the Romanian national team.

She was given the award of Cetățean de onoare ("Honorary Citizen") of the city of Sebeș in 2011.

== International honours ==
- European Championship:
  - Bronze Medalist: 2010

== Individual awards ==
- Liga Naţională Top Scorer: 2008, 2009, 2010
