= Anna Loerper =

German handball player (born 1984)

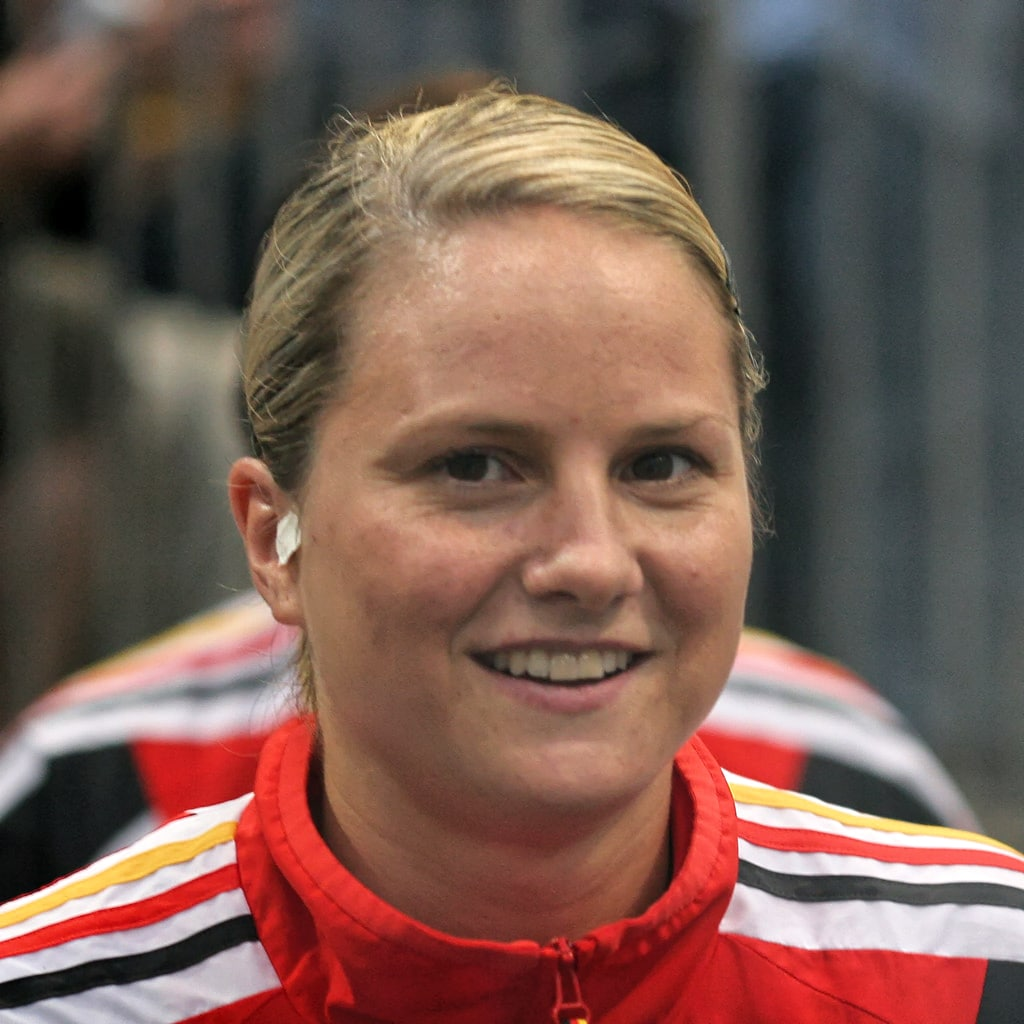

Personal information
- Nationality: German
- Born: 18 November 1984 (age 41) Kempen, West Germany
- Height: 1.64 m (5 ft 5 in)

Sport
- Sport: Handball
- Position: Centre back
- Current club: SG BBM Bietigheim
- Number: 19

Senior clubs
- Years: Team
- –2003: VT Kempen
- 2003–2011: Bayer Leverkusen
- 2011–2013: TTH Holstebro
- 2013–2014: VfL Oldenburg
- 2014–2018: TuS Metzingen
- 2018–: SG BBM Bietigheim
National team
Years	Team	Apps	(Gls)
2005–2018	Germany	235	(408)
Medal record
World Championship
Bronze medal – third place	2007 France	Team

Anna Loerper (born 18 November 1984) is a German handball player for SG BBM Bietigheim and the German national team.

At the 2007 World Women's Handball Championship she won a bronze medal with Germany. She also represented Germany at the 2008 Summer Olympics in Beijing, where Germany placed 11th. She participated at the 2009 World Women's Handball Championship in China.
