= Pro Sport Berlin 24 =

German football club

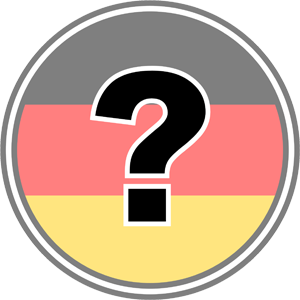
- Full name: Pro Sport Berlin 24 e.V.
- Founded: 1924
- League: inactive
Home colours	Away colours

Pro Sport Berlin 24, formerly Post SV Berlin until 2005, is a German association football club from the city of Berlin. It was formed 29 September 1924 and was one of many the sport clubs established by police and postal workers in the 1920s. Through most of its history the club has been a lower-tier local side.

== History ==
Post played just a single season in the top-flight Oberliga Berlin in 1932–33, just prior to the restructuring of German football under the Third Reich. The country's existing regional leagues were replaced by 16 Gauligen and Post failed to qualify for the new Gauliga Berlin-Brandenburg (I) after its 7th place Oberliga finish. They took part in qualification for Gauliga play at the end of the 1935–36 season, but did poorly. The team's only cup appearance also took place in 1930s when they played in the 1932 Berliner Landespokal (Berlin Cup). They advanced out of the quarterfinals past Südstern Neukölln (1:0) to be put out by Hertha BSC Berlin in their semifinal matchup (2:5).

Following World War II, occupying Allied authorities banned most organizations across the country, including sports and football clubs, as part of the process of de-Nazification. Post was lost in 1945 and not re-formed until 1949 when the club re-appeared as Blau-Gelb Berlin, named for the traditional blue and yellow of the national postal service. It was not until 1952 that the club resumed its historical identity as Post Sportverein Berlin. The division of the city into eastern and western sectors during the Cold War led to the formation of the postal workers club BSG Post Berlin which became part of the separate football competition that emerged in East Germany.

In 1972, Post joined SpVgg Berlin 74 to create Post SV 1974 Berlin. Following German reunification, BSG Post Berlin became part of Post SV 74 in 1990.

In 2005, the club was renamed Pro Sport Berlin 24 and does not field a senior men's side anymore but still offers women's football.
