= HB Ludwigsburg =

German handball club

- Full name: Handball Ludwigsburg
- Short name: HB Ludwigsburg
- Founded: 1997; 29 years ago
- Arena: MHPArena, Ludwigsburg
- Capacity: 3,800
- President: Steffen Merkle
- Head coach: Tomáš Hlavatý
- League: HBF
- 2024–25: Champions
- Club colours
Home	Away

Location of SG BBM Bietigheim

HB Ludwigsburg is a German professional handball club from Ludwigsburg, Baden-Württemberg. Its women's team is playing in the Handball-Bundesliga Frauen, and internationally in the EHF Champions League. The men's team plays in the Handball-Bundesliga.

It has previously used the name SG BBM Bietigheim. For the 2024/25 season, the women's team moved its official location from Bietigheim-Bissingen to Ludwigsburg and changed the official club name to 'HB Ludwigsburg'.

== History ==
In 2010 SG BBM Bietigheim was promoted to the Bundesliga for the first time. In the 2016-17 season, they won the German Championship for the first time, and in the same season reached the final of the EHF Cup. In 2021 they won the DHB-Pokal for the first time, and in 2022 they won their first international title, when they won the 2022 European League.

In 2024, they changed their home location to Ludwigsburg, and changed their name to 'HB Ludwigsburg'. In their first season under a new name, they won the German Championship once again.

== Team ==
=== Kits ===
HOME
2014–15	2022–23

AWAY
2014–15	2018-19	2019-20

=== Honours ===
==== Domestic competitions ====
- Handball-Bundesliga Frauen:
  - Champions (6): 2017, 2019, 2022, 2023, 2024, 2025
  - Runners-Up (2): 2018, 2021
- 2. Handball-Bundesliga
  - Champions: 2013
- German Cup:
  - Winners (4): 2021, 2022, 2023, 2025
- German Supercup:
  - Winners (6): 2017, 2019, 2021, 2022, 2023, 2024

=== European competitions ===
- Women's EHF Champions League:
  - Runners-Up: 2024
- Women's EHF European League:
  - Winners: 2022
  - Runners-Up: 2017

=== Team ===
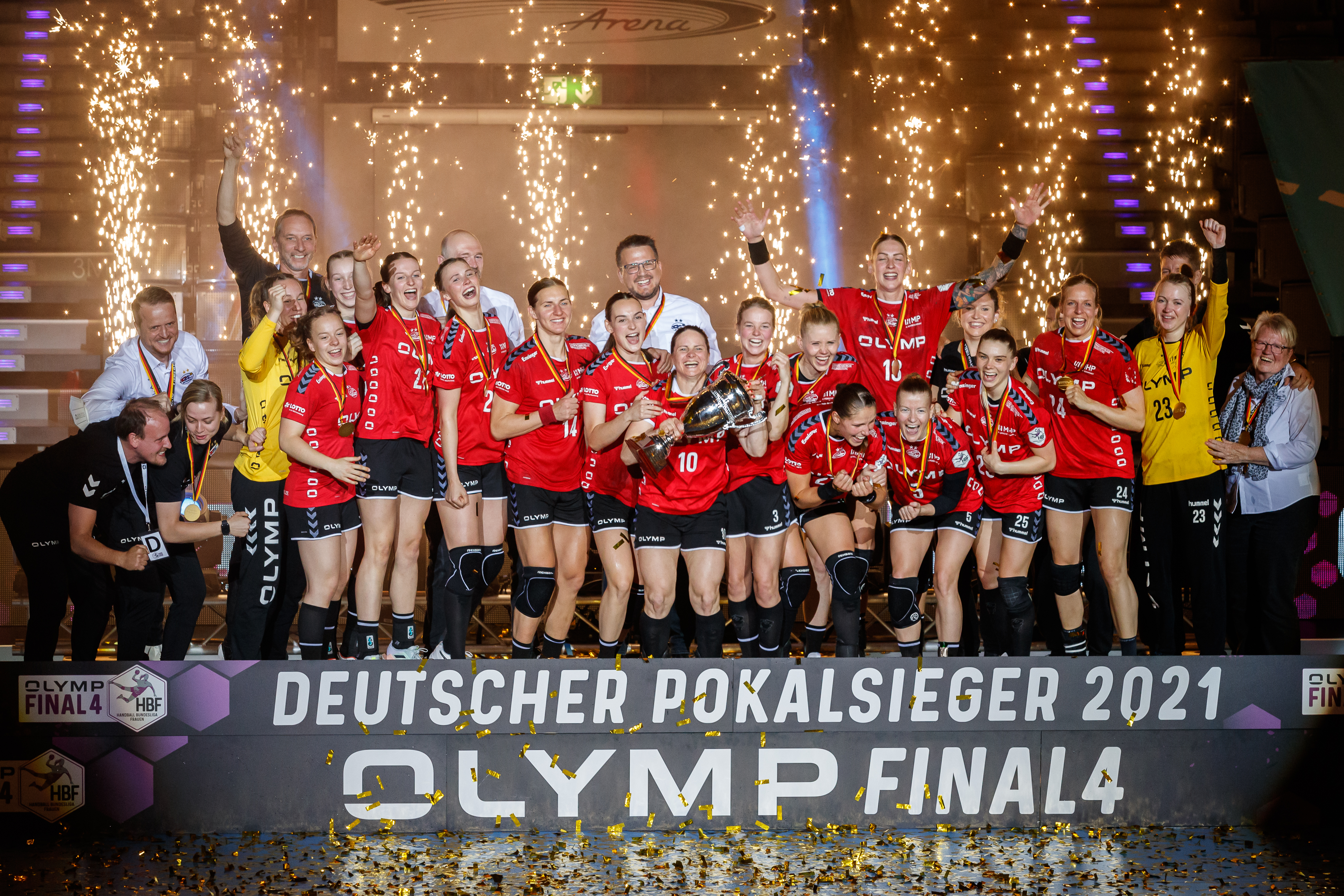
Bietigheim wins 2021 DHB-Pokal

==== Current squad ====
Squad for the 2025–26 season

Goalkeepers
Wingers
LW
RW
Line players

- 20 (Sweden) Sofia Hvenfelt (pregnant)

Back players
LB
CB

- 14 (Poland) Karolina Kudłacz-Gloc

RB

==== Transfers ====
Transfers for the 2025–26 season

Joining

- (Slovakia) Tomáš Hlavatý (Head Coach) (free agent)

Leaving

- (Denmark) Jakob Vestergaard (Head Coach) (to (Denmark) Odense Håndbold)
- (Sweden) Johanna Bundsen (GK) (to (France) Metz Handball)
- (Germany) Nicole Roth (GK) (to (Germany) HSG Blomberg-Lippe)
- (Germany) Antje Döll (LW) (to (Germany) Neckarsulmer SU)
- (Czech Republic) Veronika Malá (LW) (to (Norway) Storhamar HE)
- (Poland) Julia Niewiadomska (LB) (to (Germany) BSV Sachsen Zwickau)
- (Norway) Guro Nestaker (LB) (to (Germany) Borussia Dortmund Handball)
- (Germany) Xenia Smits (LB) (to (France) Metz Handball)
- (Germany) Mareike Thomaier (CB) (to (Germany) HSG Bensheim/Auerbach)
- (Sweden) Jenny Carlson (CB) (to (Norway) Molde Elite)
- (Denmark) Anne With Johansen (RB) (to (Slovenia) RK Krim)
- (Germany) Viola Leuchter (RB) (to (Denmark) Odense Håndbold)
- (Germany) Jenny Behrend (RW) (to (Germany) VfL Oldenburg)
- (Spain) Kaba Gassama (P) (to (Romania) CS Gloria Bistrița)
- (Slovenia) Valentina Klemenčič (P) (to (Serbia) ŽRK Crvena zvezda)
- (Hungary) Dorottya Faluvégi (RW) (to (Romania) CSM București)

=== Top scorers in the EHF Champions League ===
(All-Time) – Last updated after the 2024/2025 season

Rank	Name	Seasons played	Goals
1	(Germany) Antje Döll	7	235
2	(Germany) Xenia Smits	4	225
3	(Poland) Karolina Kudłacz-Gloc	7	214
4	(Germany) Kim Naidzinavicius	5	210
5	(Netherlands) Kelly Dulfer	2	119
6	(Czech Republic) Veronika Malá	3	119
7	(Germany) Julia Maidhof	2	115
8	(Spain) Kaba Gassama	3	115
9	(Hungary) Dorottya Faluvégi	2	81
10	(Germany) Luisa Schulze	4	75

=== Notable former players ===
- (Germany) Antje Döll (2015–2025)
- (Germany) Xenia Smits (2020–2025)
- (Germany) Kim Naidzinavicius (2016–2023)
- (Germany) Anna Loerper (2018–2021)
- (Germany) Luisa Schulze (2016–2022)
- (Germany) Dinah Eckerle (2018–2020)
- (Germany) Julia Behnke (2011–2014)
- (Germany) Jenny Behrend (2021–2025)
- (Germany) Nina Müller (2015–2018)
- (Germany) Susann Müller (2015–2018)
- (Germany) Julia Maidhof (2020–2023)
- (Germany) Amelie Berger (2019–2021)
- (Germany) Ann-Cathrin Giegerich (2011–2017)
- (Germany) Viola Leuchter (2024–2025)
- (Germany) Jenny Karolius (2009–2011)
- (Germany) Nicole Roth (2024–2025)
- (Netherlands) Tess Wester (2015–2018)
- (Netherlands) Maura Visser (2015–2020)
- (Netherlands) Angela Malestein (2014–2020)
- (Netherlands) Laura van der Heijden (2018–2020)
- (Netherlands) Danick Snelder (2020–2024)
- (Netherlands) Martine Smeets (2015–2018)
- (Netherlands) Kelly Dulfer (2021–2024)
- (Netherlands) Inger Smits (2021–2024)
- (Netherlands) Isabelle Jongenelen (2014–2015)
- (Netherlands) Charris Rozemalen (2017–2019)
- (Denmark) Trine Østergaard (2020–2023)
- (Denmark) Fie Woller (2016–2020)
- (Denmark) Stine Jørgensen (2020–2022)
- (Denmark) Mille Hundahl (2015–2018)
- (Denmark) Mia Biltoft (2016–2018)
- (Denmark) Annika Meyer (2022–2023)
- (Denmark) Cecilie Woller (2017–2018)
- (Sweden) Johanna Bundsen (2024–2025)
- (Sweden) Sofia Hvenfelt (2023–2025)
- (Sweden) Jenny Carlson (2024–2025)
- (Sweden) Daniela Gustin (2018–2019)
- (Sweden) Isabelle Andersson (2023–2024)
- (Norway) Emily Stang Sando (2020–2021)
- (Norway) Hanna Yttereng (2014–2017)
- (Norway) Maren Nyland Aardahl (2019–2020)
- (Norway) Guro Nestaker (2024–2025)
- (Hungary) Melinda Szikora (2021–2024)
- (Hungary) Dorottya Faluvégi (2023–2025)
- (Hungary) Annamária Ilyés (2013–2016)
- (Hungary) Barbara Bagócsi (2011–2014)
- (Poland) Karolina Kudłacz-Gloc (2017–2025)
- (Poland) Anna Wysokińska (2013–2015)
- (Poland) Klaudia Pielesz (2014–2015)
- (Brazil) Gabriela Moreschi (2021–2024)
- (Brazil) Fernanda da Silva (2016–2017)
- (Brazil) Fabiana Diniz (2015–2016)
- (Austria) Beate Scheffknecht (2009–2011)
- (Austria) Ines Ivančok (2017–2019)
- (Spain) Kaba Gassama (2022–2025)
- (Czech Republic) Veronika Malá (2021–2025)
- (Croatia) Žana Čović (2013–2015)
- (France) Paule Baudouin (2015–2016)
- (Azerbaijan) Valentyna Salamakha (2016–2021)

=== European record ===
Season	Competition	Round	Club	1st leg	2nd leg	Aggregate
2016–17	EHF Cup; Finalist	R1	(Serbia) ŽRK Naisa Niš	34–15	37–19	71–34
2016–17	EHF Cup; Finalist	R2	(Romania) ASC Corona 2010 Brasov	37–24	23–19	60–43
2016–17	EHF Cup; Finalist	R3	(Croatia) RK Podravka Koprivnica	23–16	24–20	47–36
2016–17	EHF Cup; Finalist	Group C	(Russia) Rostov-Don	20–23	24–34	2nd place
2016–17	EHF Cup; Finalist	Group C	(Hungary) Érd NK	28–25	27–35	2nd place
2016–17	EHF Cup; Finalist	Group C	(Norway) Byåsen HE	39–33	28–23	2nd place
2016–17	EHF Cup; Finalist	1/4	(Russia) HC Kuban Krasnodar	33–26	26–31	59–57
2016–17	EHF Cup; Finalist	1/2	(Denmark) Nykøbing Falster HK	38–27	28–32	66–59
2016–17	EHF Cup; Finalist	Final	(Russia) Rostov-Don	25–28	21–25	46–53
2017–18	Champions League	Group D	(Montenegro) ŽRK Budućnost	27–21	24–32	3rd place
2017–18	Champions League	Group D	(France) Metz Handball	26–30	21–27	3rd place
2017–18	Champions League	Group D	(Norway) Vipers Kristiansand	25–24	29–24	3rd place
2017–18	Champions League	Main Round; Group 2	(North Macedonia) HC Vardar	26–38	22–30	5th place
2017–18	Champions League	Main Round; Group 2	(Hungary) Ferencvárosi TC	27–23	22–31	5th place
2017–18	Champions League	Main Round; Group 2	(Germany) Thüringer HC	21–34	26–28	5th place
2018–19	Champions League	Qualification /SF	(Spain) BM Bera Bera	33–27		
2018–19	Champions League	Qualification /F	(Poland) MKS Lublin	34–19		
2018–19	Champions League	Group D	(Romania) CSM București	30–28	24–32	4th place
2018–19	Champions League	Group D	(Norway) Vipers Kristiansand	27–27	26–34	4th place
2018–19	Champions League	Group D	(Hungary) Ferencvárosi TC	25–28	30–33	4th place
2018–19	EHF Cup	Group A	(Denmark) Team Esbjerg	27–32	27–28	3rd place
2018–19	EHF Cup	Group A	(Norway) Storhamar Håndball Elite	28–25	28–29	3rd place
2018–19	EHF Cup	Group A	(Romania) Măgura Cisnădie	29–17	34–20	3rd place
2019–20	Champions League	Group C	(Romania) SCM Râmnicu Vâlcea	31–28	27–34	4th place
2019–20	Champions League	Group C	(Montenegro) Budućnost	20–21	28–34	4th place
2019–20	Champions League	Group C	(France) Brest Bretagne HB	32–35	30–36	4th place
2019–20	EHF Cup	Group D	(Denmark) Herning-Ikast Håndbold	26–26	25–38	4th place
2019–20	EHF Cup	Group D	(Russia) HC Lada	31–29	25–30	4th place
2019–20	EHF Cup	Group D	(Norway) Storhamar HE	32–33	28–27	4th place
2020–21	Champions League	Group A	(France) Metz Handball	25–33	27–36	8th place
2020–21	Champions League	Group A	(Russia) Rostov-Don	31–32	21–27	8th place
2020–21	Champions League	Group A	(Norway) Vipers Kristiansand	29–33	0–10	8th place
2020–21	Champions League	Group A	(Denmark) Team Esbjerg	26–33	29–37	8th place
2020–21	Champions League	Group A	(Hungary) Ferencvárosi TC	25–29	35–24	8th place
2020–21	Champions League	Group A	(Romania) CSM București	22–32	0–10	8th place
2020–21	Champions League	Group A	(Slovenia) RK Krim	22–22	26–28	8th place
2020–21	Champions League	Round of 16	(Hungary) Győri Audi ETO KC	20–37	28–32	48–69
2021–22	European League; Winner	Qual. Round 3	(Norway) Tertnes HE	39–18	21–20	60–38
2021–22	European League; Winner	Group B	(France) Neptunes de Nantes	32–29	27–25	1st place
2021–22	European League; Winner	Group B	(Romania) Minaur Baia Mare	39–20	28–20	1st place
2021–22	European League; Winner	Group B	(Poland) MKS Lublin	29–19	33–21	1st place
2021–22	European League; Winner	Quarterfinals	(France) ESBF Besançon	30–20	29–23	59–43
2021–22	European League; Winner	Semi-final	(Denmark) Herning-Ikast Håndbold	34–33		
2021–22	European League; Winner	Final	(Denmark) Viborg HK	31–20		
2022–23	EHF Champions League	Group A	(Denmark) Odense Håndbold	24–31	24–27	7th place
2022–23	EHF Champions League	Group A	(Slovenia) RK Krim Mercator	30–23	28–35	7th place
2022–23	EHF Champions League	Group A	(Norway) Vipers Kristiansand	32–30	32–34	7th place
2022–23	EHF Champions League	Group A	(France) Brest Bretagne Handball	25–25	28–32	7th place
2022–23	EHF Champions League	Group A	(Hungary) FTC-Rail Cargo Hungaria	40–20	23–28	7th place
2022–23	EHF Champions League	Group A	(Czech Republic) DHK Baník Most	46–23	47–25	7th place
2022–23	EHF Champions League	Group A	(Romania) CSM București	28–28	25–27	7th place
2023–24	EHF Champions League; Finalist	Group A	(Romania) CSM București	26–24	28–31	6th place
2023–24	EHF Champions League; Finalist	Group A	(Hungary) Győri Audi ETO KC	26–34	29–31	6th place
2023–24	EHF Champions League; Finalist	Group A	(Sweden) IK Sävehof	30–21	33–29	6th place
2023–24	EHF Champions League; Finalist	Group A	(Denmark) Odense Håndbold	29–42	25–28	6th place
2023–24	EHF Champions League; Finalist	Group A	(France) Brest Bretagne Handball	34–30	30–37	6th place
2023–24	EHF Champions League; Finalist	Group A	(Montenegro) ŽRK Budućnost Podgorica	27–22	34–16	6th place
2023–24	EHF Champions League; Finalist	Group A	(Hungary) DVSC Schaeffler	36–26	27–31	6th place
2023–24	EHF Champions League; Finalist	Playoffs	(Denmark) Ikast Håndbold	29–27	31–31	60–58
2023–24	EHF Champions League; Finalist	Quarterfinals	(Denmark) Odense Håndbold	30–26	30–32	60–58
2023–24	EHF Champions League; Finalist	Semi-final	(France) Metz Handball	36–29		
2023–24	EHF Champions League; Finalist	Final	(Hungary) Győri Audi ETO KC	24–30		
2024–25	EHF Champions League	Group B	(Denmark) Team Esbjerg	31–36	30–30	5th place
2024–25	EHF Champions League	Group B	(Montenegro) ŽRK Budućnost Podgorica	26–18	36–25	5th place
2024–25	EHF Champions League	Group B	(Hungary) Győri Audi ETO KC	26–31	19–32	5th place
2024–25	EHF Champions League	Group B	(Norway) Vipers Kristiansand	33–29	23–30	5th place
2024–25	EHF Champions League	Group B	(France) Brest Bretagne Handball	26–33	28–26	5th place
2024–25	EHF Champions League	Group B	(Romania) CS Rapid București	30–24	37–29	5th place
2024–25	EHF Champions League	Group B	(Denmark) Odense Håndbold	24–40	22–28	5th place
2024–25	EHF Champions League	Playoffs	(Slovenia) RK Krim Mercator	31–21	23–26	54–47
2024–25	EHF Champions League	Quarter-finals	(Hungary) Győri Audi ETO KC	24–25	22–29	46–54

=== Stadium ===
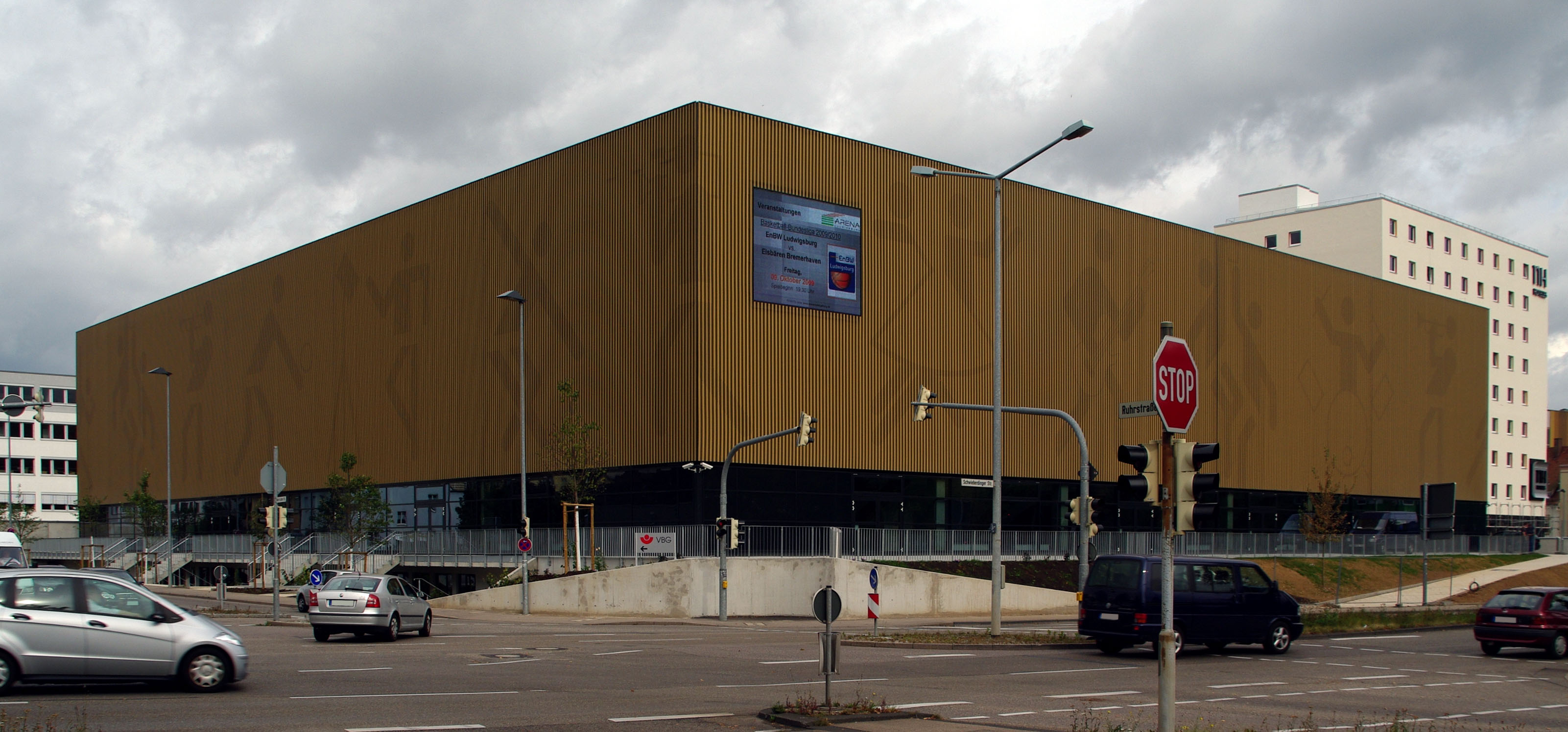
MHPArena

- Name: MHPArena
- City: Ludwigsburg
- Capacity: 3,800
- Address: Schwieberdinger Str. 30 71636
- Played in the arena since: 2009-

=== Kit manufacturers ===
- (Denmark) Hummel

== Coaching history ==
- (Germany) Severin Engelmann (2010–2011)
- (Germany) Dago Leukefeld (2013–2014)
- (Denmark) Martin Albertsen (2014–2020)
- (Germany) Markus Gaugisch (2020–2023)
- (Denmark) Jakob Vestergaard (2023–2025)
- (Slovakia) Tomáš Hlavatý (2025–present)

== Men's handball team ==
=== Crest, colours, supporters ===
==== Kits ====
HOME
2010–11	2014–15	2017–18	2018–19

AWAY
2013–14	2014–15	2015–16	2018–20

== Team ==
=== Current squad ===
Squad for the 2025–26 season

Goalkeepers

- (North Macedonia) Martin Tomovski
- (Czech Republic) Jan Hrdlička

Left Wingers
Right Wingers
Line players

Left Backs
Central Backs
Right Backs

- (Germany) Djibril M’Bengue

=== Transfers ===
Transfers for the 2026–27 season

Joining

- (Czech Republic) Jonáš Josef (LB) from (Czech Republic) HC Dukla Prague
- (Denmark) Mathias Larson (CB) from (Germany) Rhein-Neckar Löwen
- (Sweden) Marcus Norrbrink (LB) from (Sweden) OV Helsingborg HK
- (Germany) Lukas Wucherpfennig (RW) from (United States) Los Angeles THC

Leaving

- (Bosnia and Herzegovina) Alen Hadzimuhamedovic (LB) to (Germany) Dessau-Roßlauer HV
- (Italy) Max Prantner (RB) (retires)
- (Spain) Juan de la Peña (CB) to (Germany) VfL Eintracht Hagen
- (Germany) Tom Wolf (LB) (retires)

=== Transfer History ===
Transfers for the 2025–26 season

Joining

- (Czech Republic) Jan Hrdlička (GK) from (Poland) MKS Kalisz
- (North Macedonia) Martin Tomovski (GK) from (Germany) 1. VfL Potsdam
- (Italy) Max Prantner (RB) from (Italy) Sport Club Meran Handball
- (Germany) Djibril M’Bengue (RB) from (Germany) Bergischer HC
- (Germany) Maxim Orlov (CB) from (Germany) TSV Hannover-Burgdorf

Leaving

- (Spain) Gonzalo Pérez Arce (RW) to (Spain) CB Ademar León
- (Germany) Julius Kühn (LB) to (Greece) AEK Athens
- (Germany) Daniel Rebmann (GK) to (Germany) TVB Stuttgart
- (Germany) Fredrik Genz (GK) to (Germany) TuS N-Lübbecke
- (Germany) Maximilian Hejny (RB) to (Germany) TUSEM Essen
