= Diana Golub =

Russian handball player

Personal information
- Full name: Diana Arturovna Golub
- Nationality: Russian
- Born: 25 November 1992 (age 33) Krasnodar, Russia
- Height: 1.73 m (5 ft 8 in)

Sport
- Sport: Handball
- Position: Right wing
- Current club: HC Kuban Krasnodar
- Number: 7

Senior clubs
- Years: Team
- 2010-: HC Kuban Krasnodar
National team
Years	Team	Apps	(Gls)
2019-	Russia	3	(7)

Diana Golub (née Zakaryaev; born 25 November 1992) is a Russian female handball player for HC Kuban Krasnodar and the Russian national team.

She made her debut on the Russian national team on 25 September 2019, against Slovakia.

== Achievements ==
- Russian Super League
  - Bronze Medalist: 2018/19
- Russian Cup
  - Silver Medalist: 2013/14
