= Betina Riegelhuth =

Norwegian handball player (born 1987)

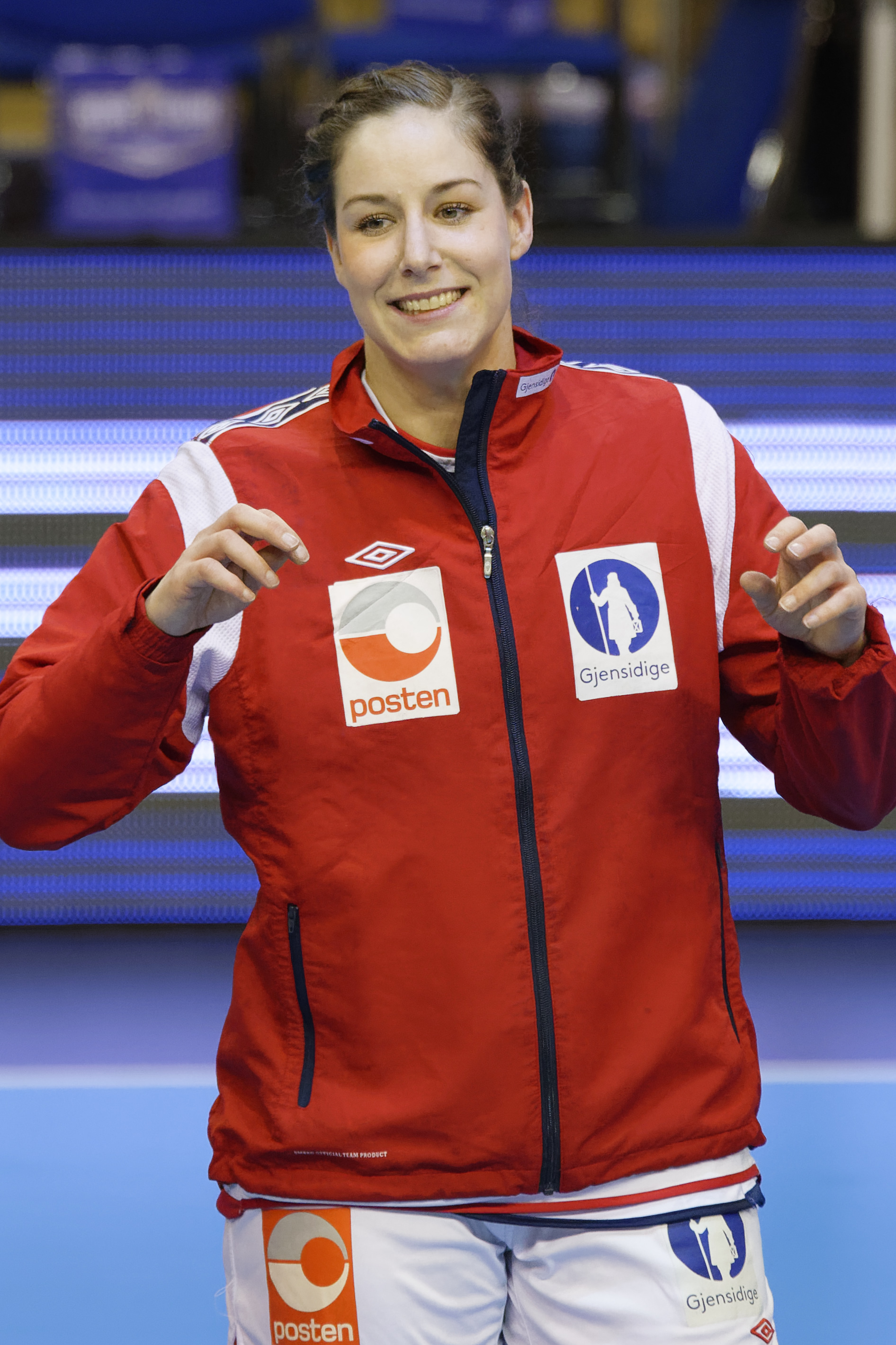

Personal information
- Nationality: Norwegian
- Born: 17 June 1987 (age 39) Oslo, Norway
- Height: 1.78 m (5 ft 10 in)

Sport
- Sport: Handball
- Position: Left back
- Current club: Storhamar HE
- Number: 22

Senior clubs
- Years: Team
- 2003–2006: Njård IL
- 2006–2008: Bækkelaget
- 2008–2015: Storhamar HE
- 2015–2016: Team Esbjerg
- 2016–2022: Storhamar HE
National team
Years	Team	Apps	(Gls)
2010–2016	Norway	53	(52)
Medal record
World Championship
Gold medal – first place	2015 Denmark
European Championship
Gold medal – first place	2014 Croatia/Hungary

Betina Riegelhuth (born 17 June 1987) is a Norwegian handball player who plays for the Norwegian club Storhamar HE. She previously played for Ski, Njård IL, Bækkelaget and Team Esbjerg. She made her debut on the national team in 2010. Her first appearance in an international championship for the national selection was in the 2014 European Women's Handball Championship, where Norway won the gold medal. She also won a gold medal at the 2015 World Women's Handball Championship in Denmark.

She was part of the Team Esbjerg side that won the 2015-16 Damehåndboldligaen, the first national championship in club history.

She is a younger sister of Linn-Kristin Riegelhuth Koren.

== Achievements ==
- World Championship:
  - Winner: 2015
- European Championship:
  - Winner: 2014
- Norwegian League:
  - Silver: 2020/2021, 2021/2022
  - Bronze: 2009/2010, 2011/2012, 2017/2018
- Norwegian Cup:
  - Finalist: 2018, 2019
