= Natalia Chigirinova =

Russian handball player

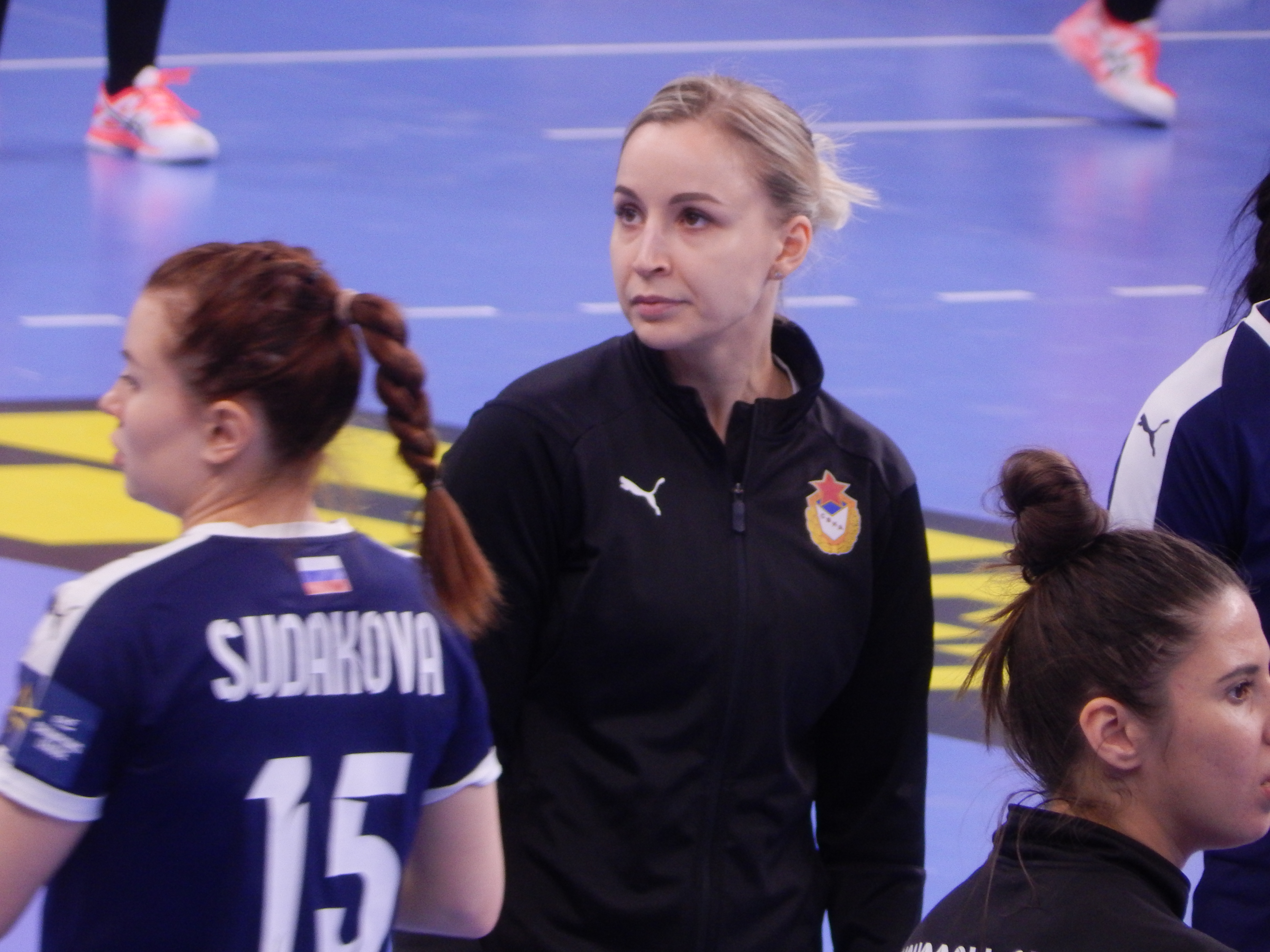

Personal information
- Full name: Natalia Chigirinova
- Nationality: Russian
- Born: 20 July 1993 (age 33) Tolyatti, Russia
- Height: 1.73 m (5 ft 8 in)

Sport
- Sport: Handball
- Position: Centre back
- Current club: CSKA Moscow
- Number: 23

Senior clubs
- Years: Team
- 2012–2016: HC Lada
- 2016–2018: HC Astrakhanochka
- 2018–2019: RK Podravka Koprivnica
- 2019–: CSKA Moscow

Natalia Chigirinova (born 20 July 1993) is a Russian handballer who plays for CSKA Moscow.

== International honours ==
- EHF Cup:
  - Winner: 2014
- Summer Universiade:
  - Gold Medalist: 2015
