= 2020–21 Russian Women's Handball Super League =

Russian Women's Handball Super League
- Season: 2020–21
- Dates: 22 August 2020 – 23 May 2021
- Champions: CSKA Moscow
- Matches played: 158
- Goals scored: 8,701 (55.07 per match)
- Top goalscorer: (Russia) Diana Golub (186 goals)

The 2020–21 Russian Women's Handball Super League was the 28th season of Russian Women's Handball Super League, Russia's premier handball league. Rostov-Don are the defending club.

The Russian Handball Federation streams every match of the league on their website.

== Format ==
The competition format for the 2019–20 season consists of a home-and-away double round-robin system. The first six teams qualifies for play-offs, while the last six plays placement round. The two highest-ranked teams of the play-offs, will qualify for the semifinals. The team's who ended up placing 7th and 8th place, will also qualified directly to the semifinals for the placement round.

== Teams ==
2020–21 Superleague teams

The following 12 clubs compete in the Super League during the 2020–21 season.

| Team | City | Arena | Capacity |
|---|---|---|---|
| Rostov-Don | Rostov-on-Don | Rostov-on-Don Palace of Sports | 3,000 |
| CSKA Moscow | Moscow | Universal Sports Hall CSKA | 5,500 |
| Lada Togliatti | Tolyatti | Olymp Sportlomplex | 2,700 |
| Dinamo-Sinara Volgograd | Volgograd | Dynamo Sports Hall | 1,500 |
| HC Kuban Krasnodar | Krasnodar | Olympus Arena | 3,000 |
| HC Astrakhanochka | Astrakhan | Sportcomplex Zvezdny | 5,000 |
| Zvezda Zvenigorod | Zvenigorod | Sport Hall Zvezda | 1,000 |
| HC Stavropolye | Stavropol | Arena Mezzanine Stavropol | 1,000 |
| AGU-Adyif Maykop | Maykop | Sports Place of ASU | 1,500 |
| KSK Luch Moscow | Moscow | Dynamo Arena | 4,400 |
| Universitet Izhevsk | Izhevsk | University Izhevsk Gymnasium | 600 |
| HC Ufa-Alisa | Ufa | MBU Sports Center °32 | 200 |

=== Foreign players ===
| Club | Player 1 | Player 2 | Player 3 | Player 4 | Player 5 |
|---|---|---|---|---|---|
| Rostov-Don | (Ukraine) Viktoriya Borshchenko | (Brazil) Mayssa Pessoa | (France) Grâce Zaadi | (Serbia) Katarina Krpež Šlezak | (Sweden) Anna Lagerquist |
| CSKA Moscow | (Brazil) Chana Masson | (North Macedonia) Sara Ristovska | (Sweden) Sabina Jacobsen | (Denmark) Kathrine Heindahl | |
| HC Astrakhanochka | (Belarus) Karyna Yezhykava | (Croatia) Ana Debelić | (Ukraine) Yevgenia Levchenko | | |
| Zvezda Zvenigorod | (Kazakhstan) Irina Baranovskaya | (Belarus) Aksana Pantus | | | |
| Lada Togliatti | (Belarus) Viktoryia Shamanouskaya | | | | |

== Regular season ==
| Pos | Team | Pld | W | D | L | GF | GA | GD | Pts | Qualification or relegation |
|---|---|---|---|---|---|---|---|---|---|---|
| 1 | Rostov-Don | 22 | 22 | 0 | 0 | 731 | 515 | +216 | 44 | Semifinals |
| 2 | CSKA Moscow | 22 | 18 | 0 | 4 | 708 | 475 | +233 | 36 | Semifinals |
| 3 | Lada Togliatti | 22 | 18 | 0 | 4 | 674 | 492 | +182 | 36 | Quarterfinals |
| 4 | HC Astrakhanochka | 22 | 15 | 0 | 7 | 622 | 486 | +136 | 30 | Quarterfinals |
| 5 | Zvezda Zvenigorod | 22 | 15 | 0 | 7 | 677 | 581 | +96 | 30 | Quarterfinals |
| 6 | HC Kuban Krasnodar | 22 | 14 | 0 | 8 | 672 | 592 | +80 | 28 | Quarterfinals |
| 7 | HC Stavropolye | 22 | 8 | 0 | 14 | 651 | 695 | −44 | 16 | 7–10th place semifinals |
| 8 | Universitet Izhevsk | 22 | 7 | 0 | 15 | 534 | 674 | −140 | 14 | 7–10th place semifinals |
| 9 | AGU-Adyif Maykop | 22 | 4 | 2 | 16 | 482 | 658 | −176 | 10 | 7–12th place quarterfinals |
| 10 | Dinamo-Sinara Volgograd | 22 | 4 | 1 | 17 | 507 | 606 | −99 | 9 | 7–12th place quarterfinals |
| 11 | KSK Luch Moscow | 22 | 3 | 0 | 19 | 465 | 698 | −233 | 6 | 7–12th place quarterfinals |
| 12 | HC Ufa-Alisa | 22 | 2 | 1 | 19 | 449 | 700 | −251 | 5 | 7–12th place quarterfinals |

Source: rushandball.ru

== Playoffs ==
=== Championship bracket ===
Quarterfinals
6 Kuban Krasnodar | 29 | 21 | 50
3 Lada Togliatti | 30 | 31 | 61
5 Zvezda Zvenigorod | 24 | 25 | 49
4 Astrakhanochka | 31 | 25 | 56

Semifinals
3 Lada Togliatti | 26 | 28 | 54
2 CSKA Moscow | 26 | 29 | 55
4 Astrakhanochka | 25 | 24 | 49
1 Rostov-Don | 35 | 25 | 60

Final
2 CSKA Moscow | 30 | 26 | 56
1 Rostov-Don | 23 | 29 | 52
Third place
4 Astrakhanochka | 34 | 17 | 51
3 Lada Togliatti | 29 | 32 | 61

| Fifth place |
| 6 Kuban Krasnodar | 28 | 28 | 56 |
| 5 Zvezda Zvenigorod | 33 | 26 | 59 |

=== Seventh place bracket ===
7–12th place quarterfinals
12 Ufa-Alisa | 36 | 26 | 62
9 AGU-Adyif Maykop | 29 | 32 | 61
11 Luch Moscow | 20 | 15 | 35
10 Dinamo-Sinara Volgograd | 29 | 35 | 64

7–10th place semifinals
12 Ufa-Alisa | 27 | 26 | 53
8 Universitet Izhevsk | 28 | 26 | 54
10 Dinamo-Sinara Volgograd | 25 | 29 | 54
7 Stavropolye | 23 | 37 | 60

Seventh place
8 Universitet Izhevsk | 23 | 29 | 52
7 Stavropolye | 38 | 31 | 69
Ninth place
12 Ufa-Alisa | 26 | 24 | 50
10 Dinamo-Sinara Volgograd | 36 | 36 | 72

| Eleventh place |
| 11 Luch Moscow | 25 | 16 | 41 |
| 9 AGU-Adyif Maykop | 25 | 28 | 53 |
