= Russian Women's Handball Super Cup =

Handball competition

- Founded: 2014
- Country: Russia
- Confederation: EHF (Europe)
- Most recent champion: Rostov-Don (2025–26)
- Most titles: Rostov-Don (8 titles)
- Level on pyramid: 1
- 2025–26 season

The Russian Women's Handball Super Cup is a trophy that is played at the beginning of each season between the champion of Russia of the previous season and the winner of the Russian Cup of the previous season. If the champion and the Cup holder are the same team, then the Cup finalist plays with the champion. The trophy is held by the Russian Handball Federation and consists of one match. The trophy was played for the first time in 2014. Currently, the title sponsor of the tournament is the Olympus bookmaker, having replaced the VKontakte social network in 2018.

== Winners list ==
The champions of Russia of the previous season are highlighted in pale blue

Season	Champions	Runners-up	Score	Location
2014	Zvezda Zvenigorod	Dynamo Astrakhan	32:27 (18:12)	Astrakhan
2015	Rostov-Don	Lada Togliatti	27:17 (17:8)	Tolyatti
2016	Rostov-Don (2)	Astrakhanochka	34:23 (21:9)	Rostov-on-Don
2017	Rostov-Don (3)	Kuban Krasnodar	32:22 (14:11)	Rostov-on-Don
2018	Rostov-Don (4)	Kuban Krasnodar	32:22 (13:8)	Krasnodar
2019	Rostov-Don (5)	Lada Togliatti	29:22 (16:8)	Tolyatti
2020	Rostov-Don (6)	CSKA Moscow	27:20 (16:9)	Rostov-on-Don
2021	Rostov-Don (7)	CSKA Moscow	25:23 (12:11)	Moscow
2022	CSKA Moscow (1)	Rostov-Don	31:27 (15:11)	Moscow
2023	CSKA Moscow (2)	Lada Togliatti	29:24 (14:10)	Kemerovo
2024	CSKA Moscow (3)	Rostov-Don	32:30 (17:13)	Moscow
2025	Rostov-Don (8)	CSKA Moscow	27:24 (16:11)	Moscow
