= 2014–15 Russian Women's Handball Super League =

Superliga
- Season: 2014–15
- Biggest home win: – (10 January 2015)
- Biggest away win: – (14 September 2014)
- Highest scoring: – (14 January 2015)

The 2014–15 Russian Handball Superliga is the 23rd season of the Super League, Russian premier Handball league.

== Team information ==
Location of teams in 2014-15 Superliga

The following 10 clubs compete in the Super League during the 2014–15 season:

Team	Location	Arena	Capacity
Békéscsaba	Békéscsaba	Városi Sportcsarnok	2,300
Debreceni VSC	Debrecen	Hódos Imre Sportcsarnok	1,800
Dunaújváros	Dunaújváros	Dunaferr Sportcsarnok	1,200
Érd	Érd	Érd Aréna	2,200
Fehérvár KC	Székesfehérvár	KÖFÉM Sportcsarnok	1,200
Ferencváros	Budapest	Elek Gyula Aréna	1,300
Győri ETO	Győr	Egyetemi Csarnok; Audi Aréna	3,036; 5,554
Mosonmagyaróvár	Mosonmagyaróvár	Mosonszolnok Sportcsarnok	500
MTK	Budapest	Elektromos csarnok	600
Siófok	Siófok	Beszédes József Sportcsarnok	550
Szeged KKSE	Szeged	Újszegedi Sportcsarnok	3,200
Vác	Vác	Városi Sportcsarnok	800

== Regular season ==
=== Standings ===
	Team	Pld	W	D	L	GF	GA	Diff	Pts
1	Rostov-Don	18	14	1	3			+	29
2	Lada	18	14	0	4			+	28
3	Zvezda	18	14	0	4			+	28
4	Astrakhanochka	18	14	0	4			+	28
5	Dinamo	18	13	1	4			+	27
6	Kuban	18	7	0	11			−	14
7	Luch	18	6	1	11			−	13
8	Universitet	18	4	0	14			−	8
9	IPress Center-Vác	18	1	1	16			−	3
10	Mosonmagyaróvári KC SE	18	1	0	17			−	2

Championship Playoff
Relegation Round

Pld - Played; W - Won; D - Drawn; L - Lost; GF - Goals for; GA - Goals against; Diff - Difference; Pts - Points.

=== Schedule and results ===
In the table below the home teams are listed on the left and the away teams along the top.

	Békéscsabai ENKSE	Debreceni VSC	Dunaújvárosi Kohász KA	Érdi VSE	Fehérvár KC	Ferencvárosi TC	Győri ETO KC	Mosonmagyaróvári KC SE	MTK Budapest KC	Siófok KC	Szeged KKSE	Váci NKSE
Békéscsaba		31–28	29–28	18–33	24–22	26–32	22–33	32–21	29–23	25–32	33–25	32–26
Debreceni VSC	32–29		32–38	28–23	26–21	21–42	20–35	27–25	30–19	31–30	34–29	18–19
Dunaújvárosi Kohász KA	33–17	30–22		23–22	25–20	19–28	22–28	25–21	31–24	24–26	39–20	27–20
Érd	32–15	25–24	18–24		21–21	25–32	23–28	26–23	29–26	30–28	39–17	29–23
Fehérvár KC	25–20	23–20	23–19	20–25		19–30	19–27	26–24	29–25	30–26	38–25	17–13
Ferencváros	42–27	32–17	38–24	27–18	33–28		24–21	32–19	33–26	28–28	45–16	32–20
Győri ETO	35–17	30–16	27–19	32–27	29–21	31–26		39–20	38–17	34–20	31–19	36–21
Mosonmagyaróvár	35–25	26–27	21–22	29–32	19–21	22–35	21–28		21–21	25–25	30–20	27–25
MTK Budapest	34–27	27–28	23–27	20–23	19–20	26–32	22–31	26–25		29–37	34–21	25–23
Siófok	38–26	30–28	20–21	24–23	29–20	28–38	23–29	33–26	40–24		44–21	27–23
Szeged KKSE	26–27	21–29	20–41	20–33	20–22	24–43	16–38	29–36	27–27	21–39		27–39
Vác	27–24	30–29	23–23	16–26	19–24	22–31	13–31	21–22	27–25	32–29	27–19	
