= 2010–11 Russian Women's Handball Super League =

19th edition of women's handball championship in Russia

The 2010-11 Russian Women's Handball Super League was the 19th edition of the premier championship for women's handball in Russia. Ten teams took part in the competition, which took place from 4 September 2010 to 28 May 2011. The competition system was reformed, with the play-offs being expanded from four to eight teams.

Dynamo Volgograd won its third championship in a row, beating Rostov-Don in the final. Dynamo qualified for the Champions league, while Rostov-Don qualified for the competition's qualifying stage, Lada Togliatti and HC Astrakhanochka for the EHF Cup, and Zvezda Zvenigorod for the Cup Winners' Cup. Universitet Izhevsk lost the relegation play-off, but was spared from relegation as Kirovchanka Saint Petersburg retired following the end of the season.

== First stage ==
| # | Team | Pld | W | D | L | GF | GA | Pt | Notes |
|---|---|---|---|---|---|---|---|---|---|
| 1 | Dynamo Volgograd | 18 | 15 | 2 | 1 | 581 | 410 | 32 | 2nd Stage's Championship Round |
| 2 | Rostov-Don | 18 | 15 | 0 | 3 | 514 | 377 | 30 | 2nd Stage's Championship Round |
| 3 | Zvezda Zvenigorod | 18 | 14 | 0 | 4 | 599 | 446 | 28 | 2nd Stage's Championship Round |
| 4 | Lada Togliatti | 18 | 12 | 1 | 5 | 539 | 416 | 25 | 2nd Stage's Championship Round |
| 5 | Astrakhanochka | 18 | 9 | 2 | 7 | 480 | 487 | 20 | 2nd Stage's Championship Round |
| 6 | Luch Moscow | 18 | 9 | 1 | 8 | 532 | 517 | 19 | 2nd Stage's Championship Round |
| 7 | Kuban Krasnodar | 18 | 5 | 2 | 11 | 461 | 503 | 12 | 2nd Stage's Relegation Round |
| 8 | Universitet Izhevsk | 18 | 2 | 1 | 15 | 389 | 608 | 5 | 2nd Stage's Relegation Round |
| 9 | Kirovchanka | 18 | 2 | 1 | 15 | 414 | 576 | 5 | 2nd Stage's Relegation Round |
| 10 | AGU-Adyif Maykop | 18 | 2 | 0 | 16 | 405 | 584 | 4 | 2nd Stage's Relegation Round |

== Second stage ==
| # | Team | Pld | W | D | L | GF | GA | Pt | Notes |
|---|---|---|---|---|---|---|---|---|---|
| 1 | Dynamo Volgograd | 10 | 7 | 1 | 2 | 289 | 279 | 47 | Championship Play-offs |
| 2 | Rostov-Don | 10 | 7 | 0 | 3 | 266 | 230 | 44 | Championship Play-offs |
| 3 | Lada Togliatti | 10 | 7 | 2 | 1 | 273 | 236 | 41 | Championship Play-offs |
| 4 | Zvezda Zvenigorod | 10 | 3 | 1 | 6 | 264 | 268 | 35 | Championship Play-offs |
| 5 | Astrakhanochka | 10 | 2 | 0 | 8 | 275 | 301 | 24 | Championship Play-offs |
| 6 | KSK Luch Moscow | 10 | 2 | 0 | 8 | 268 | 321 | 23 | Championship Play-offs |
| 7 | Kuban Krasnodar | 12 | 10 | 1 | 1 | 390 | 312 | 33 | Championship Play-offs |
| 8 | AGU-Adyif Maykop | 12 | 6 | 0 | 6 | 292 | 322 | 16 | Championship Play-offs |
| 9 | Kirovchanka | 12 | 5 | 1 | 6 | 301 | 306 | 16 | Relegation Play-off |
| 10 | Universitet Izhevsk | 12 | 2 | 0 | 10 | 321 | 364 | 9 | Relegation Play-off |

== Championship play-offs ==
=== Quarter-finals ===
| Team #1 | Agg. | Team #2 | L #1 | L #2 | L #3 |
|---|---|---|---|---|---|
| AGU-Adyif Maykop | 0 - 2 | Dynamo Volgograd | 19 - 37 | 15 - 35 | |
| Kuban Krasnodar | 1 - 2 | Rostov-Don | 19 - 18 | 16 - 22 | 21 - 25 |
| Luch Moscow | 0 - 2 | Lada Togliatti | 26 - 29 | 25 - 35 | |
| Astrakhanochka | 0 - 2 | Zvezda Zvenigorod | 26 - 27 | 23 - 47 | |

=== 5th to 8th positions ===
==== 1st Stage ====
| Team #1 | Agg. | Team #2 | L #1 | L #2 | L #3 |
|---|---|---|---|---|---|
| AGU-Adyif Maykop | 0 - 2 | Astrakhanochka | 27 - 29 | 19 - 35 | |
| Kuban Krasnodar | 2 - 0 | Luch Moscow | 27 - 26 | 43 - 30 | |

==== 2nd Stage ====
| Team #1 | Agg. | Team #2 | L #1 | L #2 | L #3 |
|---|---|---|---|---|---|
| HC Kuban Krasnodar | 0 - 2 | Astrakhanochka | 23 - 24 | 23 - 27 | |
| AGU-Adyif Maykop | 0 - 2 | Luch Moscow | 28 - 29 | 29 - 42 | |

=== Semifinals ===
| Team #1 | Agg. | Team #2 | L #1 | L #2 | L #3 |
|---|---|---|---|---|---|
| Lada Togliatti | 1 - 2 | Rostov-Don | 19 - 17 | 15 - 19 | 13 - 18 |
| Zvezda Zvenigorod | 0 - 2 | Dynamo Volgograd | 30 - 31 | 26 - 31 | |

=== Third Place ===
| Team #1 | Agg. | Team #2 | L #1 | L #2 | L #3 |
|---|---|---|---|---|---|
| Zvezda Zvenigorod | 0 - 2 | Lada Togliatti | 24 - 30 | 26 - 34 | |

=== Final ===
| Team #1 | Agg. | Team #2 | L #1 | L #2 | L #3 |
|---|---|---|---|---|---|
| Rostov-Don | 0 - 2 | Dynamo Volgograd | 31 - 32 | 22 - 23 | |

== Final Table ==
| # | Team | 2010 | Notes |
|---|---|---|---|
| 1 | Dynamo Volgograd | | 2012 Champions League |
| 2 | Rostov-Don | 1 | 2012 Champions League's Qualifying Stage |
| 3 | Lada Togliatti | 1 | 2012 EHF Cup |
| 4 | Zvezda Zvenigorod | 2 | 2012 Cup Winners' Cup |
| 5 | Astrakhanochka | 4 | 2012 EHF Cup |
| 6 | Kuban Krasnodar | 1 | |
| 7 | Luch Moscow | 1 | |
| 8 | AGU-Adyif Maykop | 1 | |
| 9 | Kirovchanka | (N) | Voluntarily relegated |
| 10 | Universitet Izhevsk | 2 | |
