= Yekaterina Marennikova =

Russian handball player

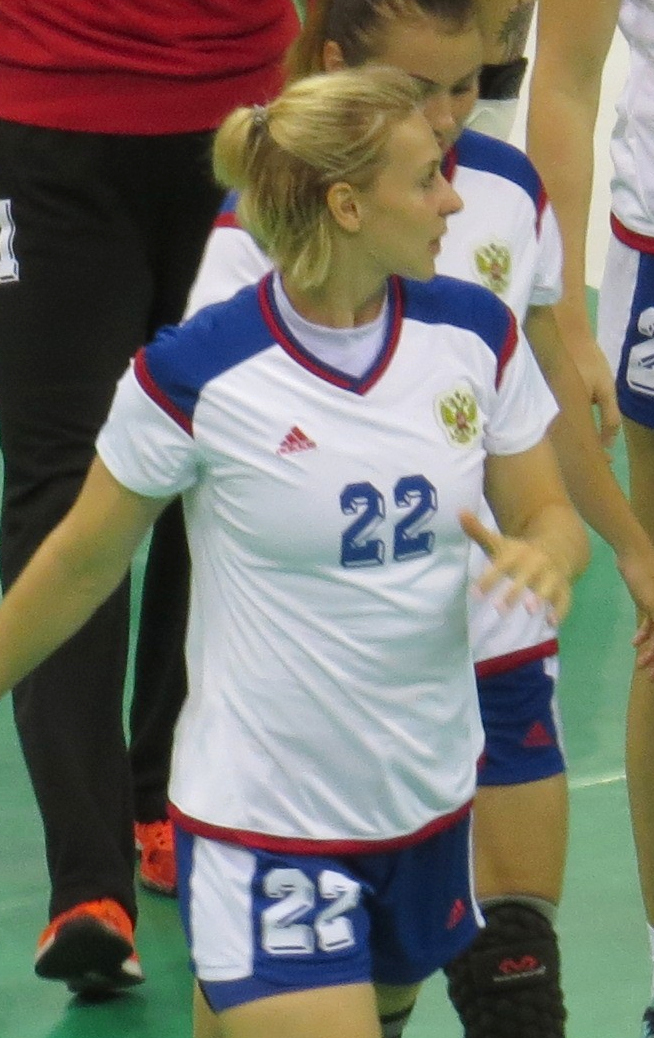
- Marennikova at the 2016 Summer Olympics

Personal information
- Full name: Yekaterina Aleksandrovna Marennikova
- Nationality: Russian
- Born: 29 April 1982 (age 44) Saint Petersburg, Russia
- Height: 1.76 m (5 ft 9 1/2 in)

Sport
- Sport: Handball
- Position: Left wing

Senior clubs
- Years: Team
- 1999–2004: Tremp-Spartak Sankt Petersburg
- 2004–2012: Handball Club Lada
- 2012–2016: Zvezda Zvenigorod
- 2016–2017: HC Kuban Krasnodar
National team
Years	Team	Apps	(Gls)
–	Russia	128	(270)

Teams managed
- 2019–2022: Handball Club Lada (assistent)
- 2022–2023: Handball Club Lada
- 2023–2024: Handball Club Lada II (assistant)
- 2024–2025: Handball Club Lada
Medal record
Olympic Games
Gold medal – first place	2016 Rio de Janeiro	Team
Silver medal – second place	2008 Beijing	Team
World Championship
Gold medal – first place	2005 Russia

Yekaterina Aleksandrovna Marennikova (Russian: Екатерина Александровна Маренникова; born 29 April 1982) is a Russian former handball player and current coach. She is world champion and olympic medallist the Russian national team. She won gold medals at the 2005 World Championship and 2016 Olympics in Rio, placing second in 2008 and eighth in 2012.

== Playing career ==
Marennikova started her career at Tremp-Spartak Sankt Petersburg. In 2004, she joined Handball Club Lada. Here, she won the 2005, 2006, and 2008 Russian Championships and the 2012 EHF European League. In 2007, she reached the final of the EHF Champions League.

In 2012, she joined Zvezda Zvenigorod. Here, she won the 2014 Russian Cup.

In 2016, she joined HC Kuban Krasnodar for a single season, before she retired.

== Coaching career ==
In 2019, she became the assistant coach at Handball Club Lada. In January 2022, she overtook the head coach position for the rest of the season. For the 2022–23 season, she became the assistant coach of the second team. For the 2024–25 season, she once again became the head coach at the club. She stopped in this position in April 2025.

== Personal life ==
Marennikova is married to Eduard and has a son Andrei. She has a degree in physical education from the Lesgaft Institute in Saint Petersburg.
