= Polina Gorshkova =

Russian handball player

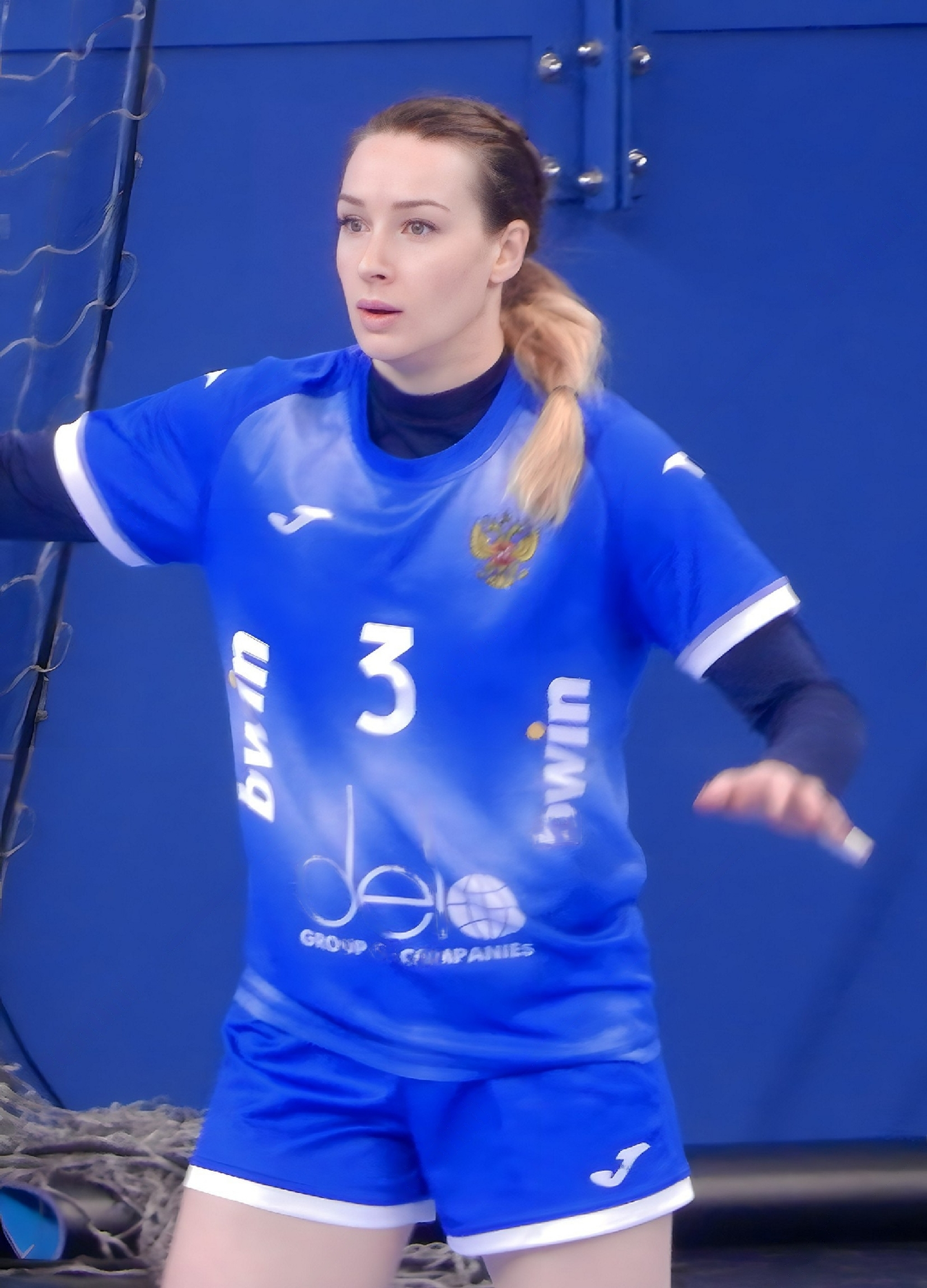
- Gorshkova in 2021

Personal information
- Full name: Polina Petrovna Gorshkova
- Nationality: Russian
- Born: 22 July 1989 (age 37) Tolyatti, Russia
- Height: 1.72 m (5 ft 8 in)

Sport
- Sport: Handball
- Position: Left wing
- Current club: Rapid București
- Number: 3

Senior clubs
- Years: Team
- 2006–2019: Handball Club Lada
- 2019–2024: CSKA Moscow
- 2024–: Rapid București
National team
- Years: Team
- 2012–: Russia
Medal record
Representing ROC
Olympic Games
Silver medal – second place	2020 Tokyo	Team
Representing Russia
Summer Universiade
Gold medal – first place	2015 Gwangju	Team

Polina Petrovna Gorshkova (Russian: Полина Петровна Горшкова, IPA: [pɐˈlʲinə ɡɐrˈʂkovə]; born 22 July 1989) is a Russian handballer for Rapid București and the Russian national team.

== Achievements ==
- Russian Super League
  - Gold: 2008
  - Silver: 2007, 2014, 2015, 2017, 2018, 2019
  - Bronze: 2009, 2011, 2012, 2016
- Russian Cup
  - Gold: 2006
  - Silver: 2007, 2009, 2015, 2019
  - Bronze: 2010, 2012, 2013, 2014
