= Elena Utkina =

Russian handball player (born 1990)

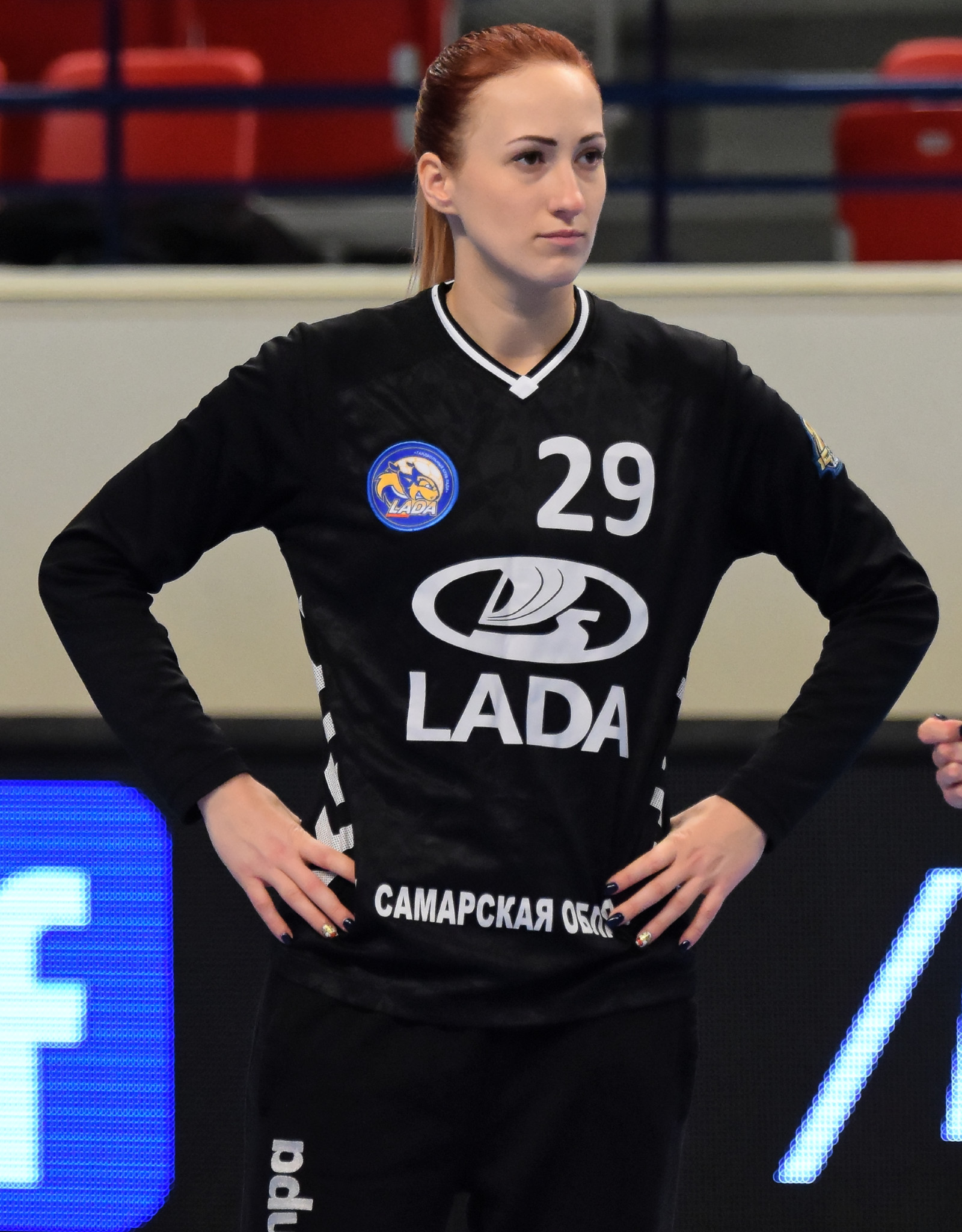
- Elena Utkina (2018)

Personal information
- Full name: Elena Mikhailovna Utkina
- Nationality: Russian
- Born: 29 May 1990 (age 36) Volgograd, Soviet Union
- Height: 1.81 m (5 ft 11 in)

Sport
- Sport: Handball
- Position: Goalkeeper
- Current club: Kuban Krasnodar
- Number: 29

Senior clubs
- Years: Team
- 2011–2015: Dinamo Volgograd
- 2015–2019: HC Lada
- 2019–2021: CSKA Moscow
- 2021: →Kuban (loan)
- 2021: Baia Mare
- 2022: Luch Moscow
- 2022–: Kuban
National team
Years	Team	Apps	(Gls)
2013–	Russia	27	(1)
Medal record
Summer Universiade
Gold medal – first place	2015 Gwangju	Team

Elena Mikhailovna Utkina (Russian: Елена Михайловна Уткина, maiden name Fomina, former name Konova; born 29 May 1990) is a Russian handballer for Kuban Krasnodar and the Russian national team.

== International honours ==
- EHF Champions League:
  - Fourth Place: 2015
- EHF Cup Winners' Cup:
  - Finalist: 2016
  - Semifinalist: 2012
