= Olga Akopyan =

Russian handball player

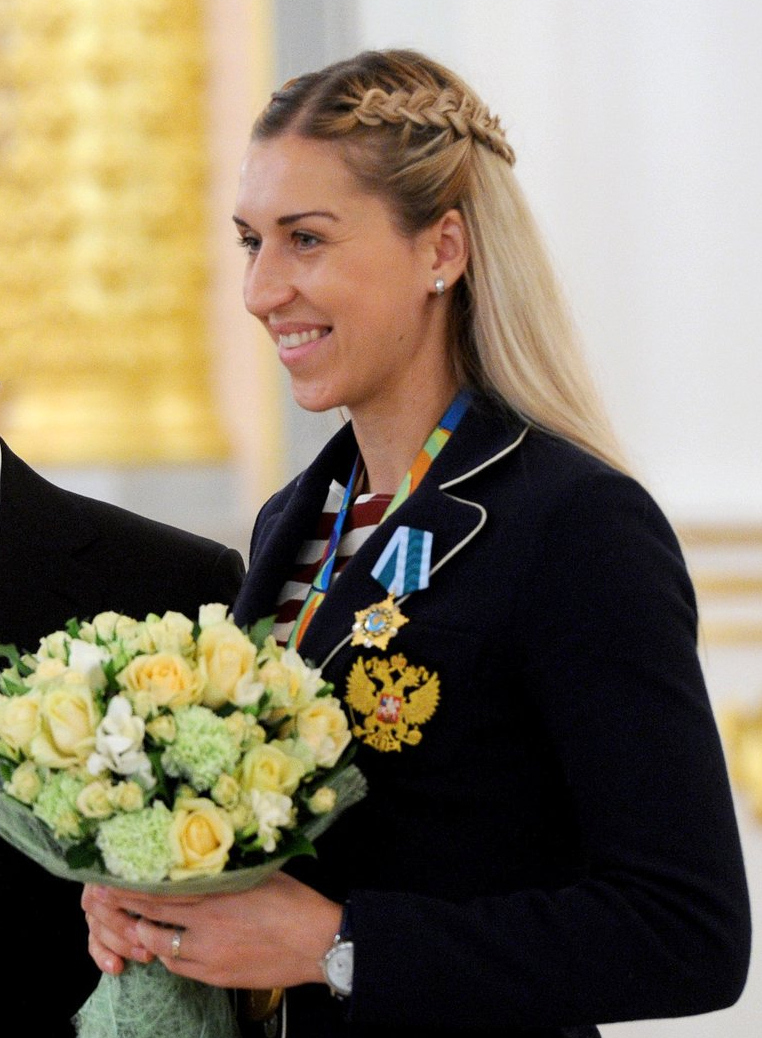
- Akopyan in 2016

Personal information
- Nationality: Russian
- Born: 4 March 1985 (age 41) Volgograd, RSFSR, USSR
- Height: 1.76 m (5 ft 9 in)

Sport
- Sport: Handball
- Position: Left back
- Current club: Retired

Senior clubs
- Years: Team
- 2002–2015: Dinamo Volgograd
- 2015–2016: Lada Togliatti
National team
Years	Team	Apps	(Gls)
2005–2016	Russia	133	(367)

Teams managed
- 2019–2022: CSKA Moscow (assistant)
- 2021–: Russia (assistant)
- 2022–: Russia youth
- 2022–2024: CSKA Moscow
- 2024–: Zvezda Zvenigorod
Medal record
Olympic Games
Gold medal – first place	2016 Rio de Janeiro	Team
World Championship
Gold medal – first place	2007 France
Gold medal – first place	2009 China
European Championship
Silver medal – second place	2006 Sweden
Bronze medal – third place	2008 Macedonia

Olga Sergeyevna Akopyan (Russian: Ольга Сергеевна Акопян; née Levina on 4 March 1985) is a retired Russian handball player and current coach, who last played for Lada Togliatti and the Russian national handball team. She won the world title in 2007 and 2009 and an Olympic gold medal in 2016, placing eighth in 2012.

She is currently the head coach for Zvezda Zvenigorod in the Russian Super League and the assistant coach in the Russia women's national handball team.

== Playing career ==
Between 2002 and 2015 she played for Dinamo Volgograd. After the 2012 Olympics she married Eduard Akopyan, and in 2013 gave birth to a daughter Arina. She returned to training in November 2013. With Dinamo Volgograd she won the 2009, 2010, 2011, 2012 and 2014 Russian championship and the 2008 EHF European League.

In 2015 she joined Lada Togliatti for a single season. She retired in 2016 after winning Olympic gold.

== Coaching career ==
In 2019 she became the assistant coach at CSKA Moscow. After CSKA Moscow had fired their coach Jan Leslie in March 2021, she became the interim head coach at the team. Under her guidance the team won the 2021 Russian championship. After the season she returned to be the assistant, but in 2022 she once again stepped up to be the head coach. This time she won the Russian championship and cup double in both 2023 and 2024. After the 2023-24 season she stopped as the coach of the club. Afterwards she became the head coach at Zvezda Zvenigorod.

In february 2021 she became the assistant at the Russia women's team. From 2022 she became the coach of the Russia youth team.
