= Olga Gorshenina =

Russian handball player

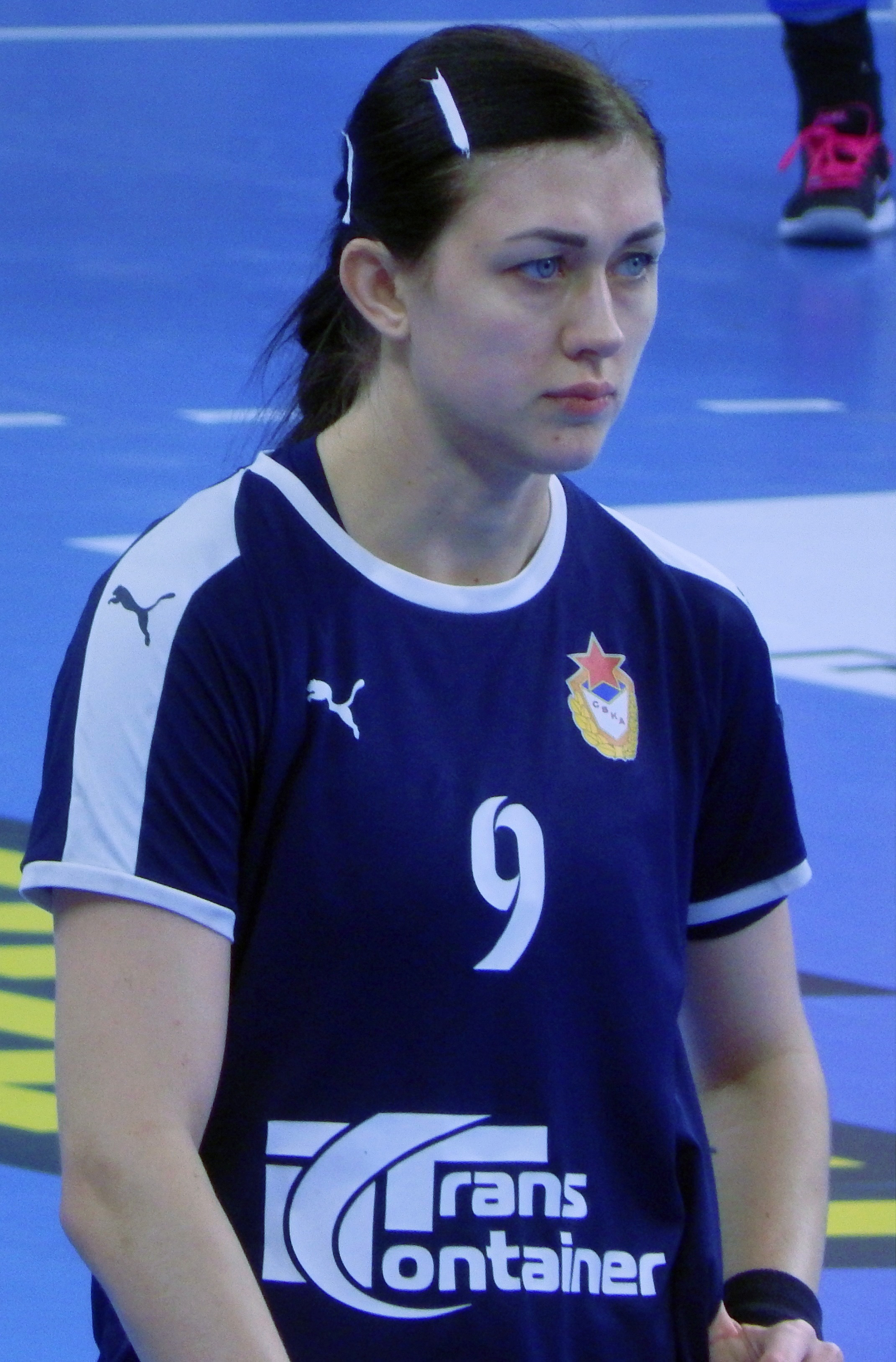

Personal information
- Full name: Olga Anatolyevna Gorshenina
- Nationality: Russian
- Born: 9 November 1990 (age 35) Tolyatti, Russia
- Height: 1.80 m (5 ft 11 in)

Sport
- Sport: Handball
- Position: Right back
- Current club: CSKA Moscow
- Number: 9

Senior clubs
- Years: Team
- 2009–2014: HC Lada
- 2014–2016: HC Astrakhanochka
- 2016–2017: HC Kuban Krasnodar
- 2017–2019: Alba Fehérvár KC
- 2019–2021: CSKA Moscow
- 2021–2022: SCM Râmnicu Vâlcea
National team
Years	Team	Apps	(Gls)
2010–	Russia	71	(53)
Medal record
World Championship
Bronze medal – third place	2019 Japan

Olga Anatolyevna Gorshenina (Russian: Ольга Анатольевна Горшенина; born 9 November 1990) is a Russian handballer for CSKA Moscow and the Russian national team.

== International honours ==
- EHF Cup:
  - Winner: 2012, 2014
