= Oksana Korolyova =

Russian handball player

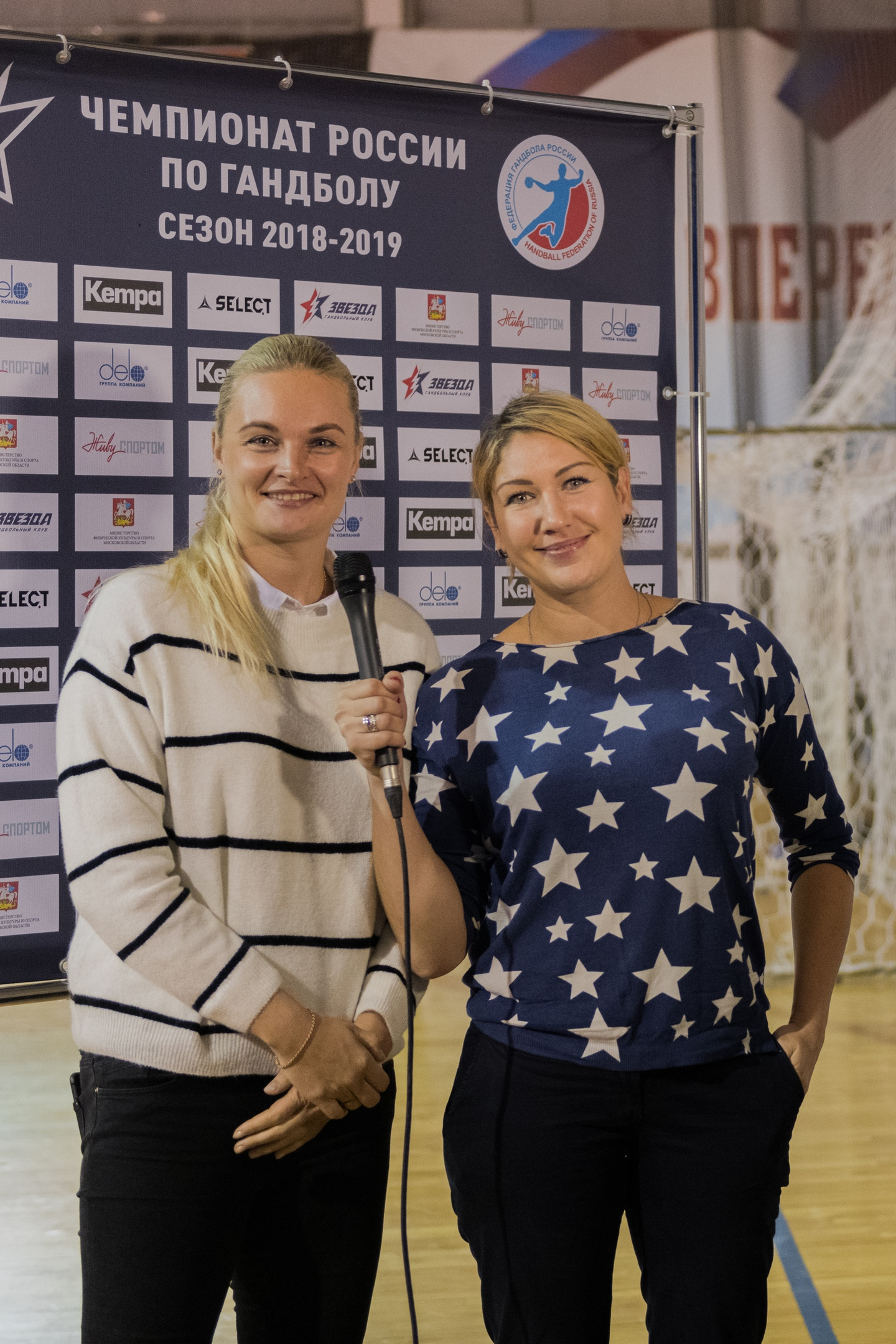
- Oksana Korolyova (left) together with Yelena Dmitriyeva

Personal information
- Full name: Oksana Igorevna Korolyova
- Nationality: Russian
- Born: 17 July 1984 (age 42) Astrakhan, Russian SFSR, Soviet Union
- Height: 1.86 m (6 ft 1 in)

Sport
- Sport: Handball
- Position: Left back
- Current club: Retired

Senior clubs
- Years: Team
- -2000: Astrakhan
- 2000-2007: Handball Club Lada
- 2001-2002: AGU Adyif (loan)
- 2007-2016: Zvezda Zvenigorod
- 2016-2017: HC Kuban Krasnodar
National team
Years	Team	Apps	(Gls)
2004-?	Russia	70	(103)
Medal record
World Championship
Gold medal – first place	2009 China	Team

Oksana Igorevna Korolyova (Russian: Оксана Игоревна Королёва; born 17 July 1984 in Astrakhan) is a Russian former handball player. She played for the Russian National Team, she won a gold medal at the 2009 World Women's Handball Championship.

== Career ==
Korolyova started playing handball at age 12. In 2000 she joined Handball Club Lada, and in the 2001-02 season she was loaned to league rivals AGU Adyif. From the 2002-03 season onwards she was part of the Lada team, and here she won the 2003, 2004 and 2005 Russian championship and reached the final of the EHF Champions League in 2007.

In 2007 she joined Zvezda Zvenigorod, where she won the 2008 EHF Champions League, beating Austrian Hypo NÖ in the final. She also won the 2009, 2010, 2011 and 2014 Russian Cup.

In 2016 HC Kuban Krasnodar for a single season, before she retired in 2017.

== National team ==
Korolyova played for various Russian youth national teams. She won gold medals at both the U17 European Championship in 2001, U19 European Championship in 2022 and U20 World Championship in 2003.

In 2004 she made her debut for the Russian senior national team. With the Russian team she won bronze medals at the 2008 European Championship and gold medals at the 2009 World Championship.
