= Ekaterina Barkalova =

Russian handballer

Personal information
- Full name: Ekaterina Barkalova
- Nationality: Russian
- Born: 5 June 1995 (age 31) Kropotkin, Russia
- Height: 1.82 m (6 ft 0 in)

Sport
- Sport: Handball
- Position: Left back
- Current club: Kuban
- Number: 66

Senior clubs
- Years: Team
- –2017: Stavropol SKFU
- 2017–: Kuban

Ekaterina Barkalova (born 5 June 1995) is a Russian handballer who plays for Kuban.

== Individual awards ==
- Russian Super League Top Scorer: 2017
