= Polina Kaplina =

Russian handball player

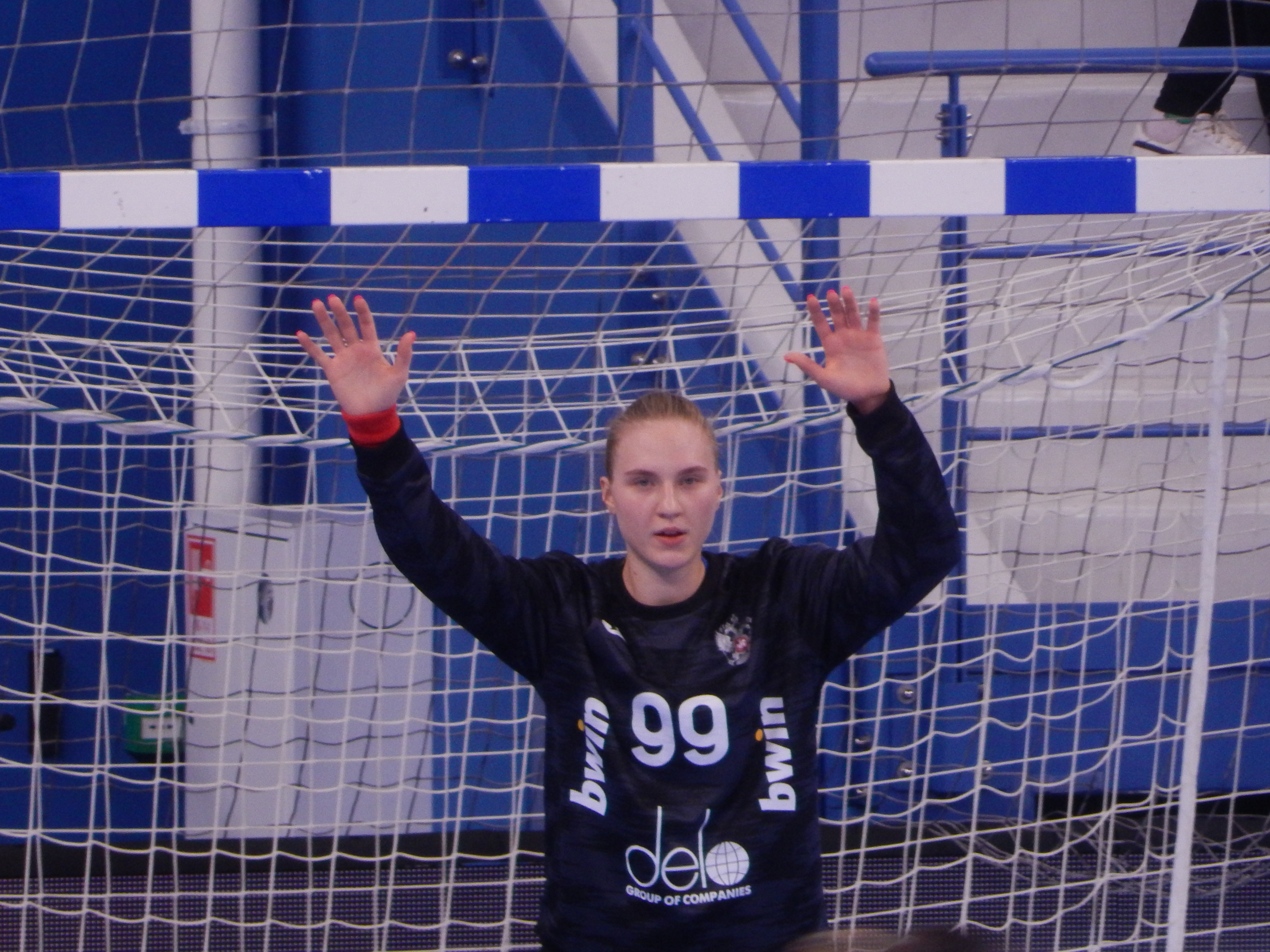
- Polina Markina (2021)

Personal information
- Nationality: Russian
- Born: 16 August 1999 (age 27) Irkutsk, Russia
- Height: 179 cm (70 in)

Sport
- Sport: Handball
- Position: Goalkeeper
- Current club: CSKA Moscow
- Number: 99

Senior clubs
- Years: Team
- 2017-2019: HC Kuban Krasnodar
- 2019-: CSKA Moscow
- 2020: —> on loan Zvezda Zvenigorod
National team
Years	Team	Apps	(Gls)
–	Russia	7	(7)
- Updated on 30 August 2025

Polina Kaplina (born 16 August 1999) is a Russian handballer who plays for CSKA Moscow.

== Awards and recognition ==
- All-Star Goalkeeper of the Junior World Championship: 2018
