= Anastasiia Riabtseva =

Russian handball player (born 1996)

Personal information
- Full name: Anastasiia Olegovna Riabtseva
- Nationality: Russian
- Born: 17 January 1996 (age 30) Krasnodar, Russia
- Height: 1.78 m (5 ft 10 in)

Sport
- Sport: Handball
- Position: Goalkeeper
- Current club: HC Astrakhanochka
- Number: 1

Senior clubs
- Years: Team
- 2014-: HC Astrakhanochka
National team
Years	Team	Apps	(Gls)
2016-	Russia	2	(0)
Medal record
Youth Olympics
Silver medal – second place	2014 Nanjing
IHF Junior World Championship
Silver medal – second place	2016 Russia
European Junior Championship
Silver medal – second place	2015 Spain
European Youth Championship
Silver medal – second place	2013 Poland
European Youth Olympic Festival
Silver medal – second place	2013 Utrecht

Anastasiia Olegovna Riabtseva (Russian: Анастасия Олеговна Рябцева) (born 17 January 1996) is a Russian female handball player for HC Astrakhanochka and the Russian national team.

She also represented Russia in the 2016 Women's Junior World Handball Championship, 2015 Women's U-19 European Handball Championship and at the 2013 European Women's U-17 Handball Championship, where she received silver all three times. She also won silver medal at the 2014 Summer Youth Olympic in Nanjing.

She was awarded for the World Female Young Handball Player 2016/17 as Goalkeeper, by Handball-Planet.com.

== Achievements ==
- Russian Super League
  - Gold Medalist: 2016
  - Bronze Medalist: 2015, 2018
- Russian Cup
  - Silver Medalist: 2016
  - Bronze Medalist: 2017, 2018
- Russian Super Cup
  - Silver Medalist: 2016
- EHF Champions League:
  - Fourth place: 2014/15
- Youth Olympics:
  - Silver Medalist: 2014
- World Junior Championship:
  - Silver Medalist: 2016
- European Junior Championship:
  - Silver Medalist: 2015
- European Youth Championship:
  - Silver Medalist: 2013
