= Victoria Zhilinskayte =

Russian handball player (born 1989)

Victoria Zhilinskaite
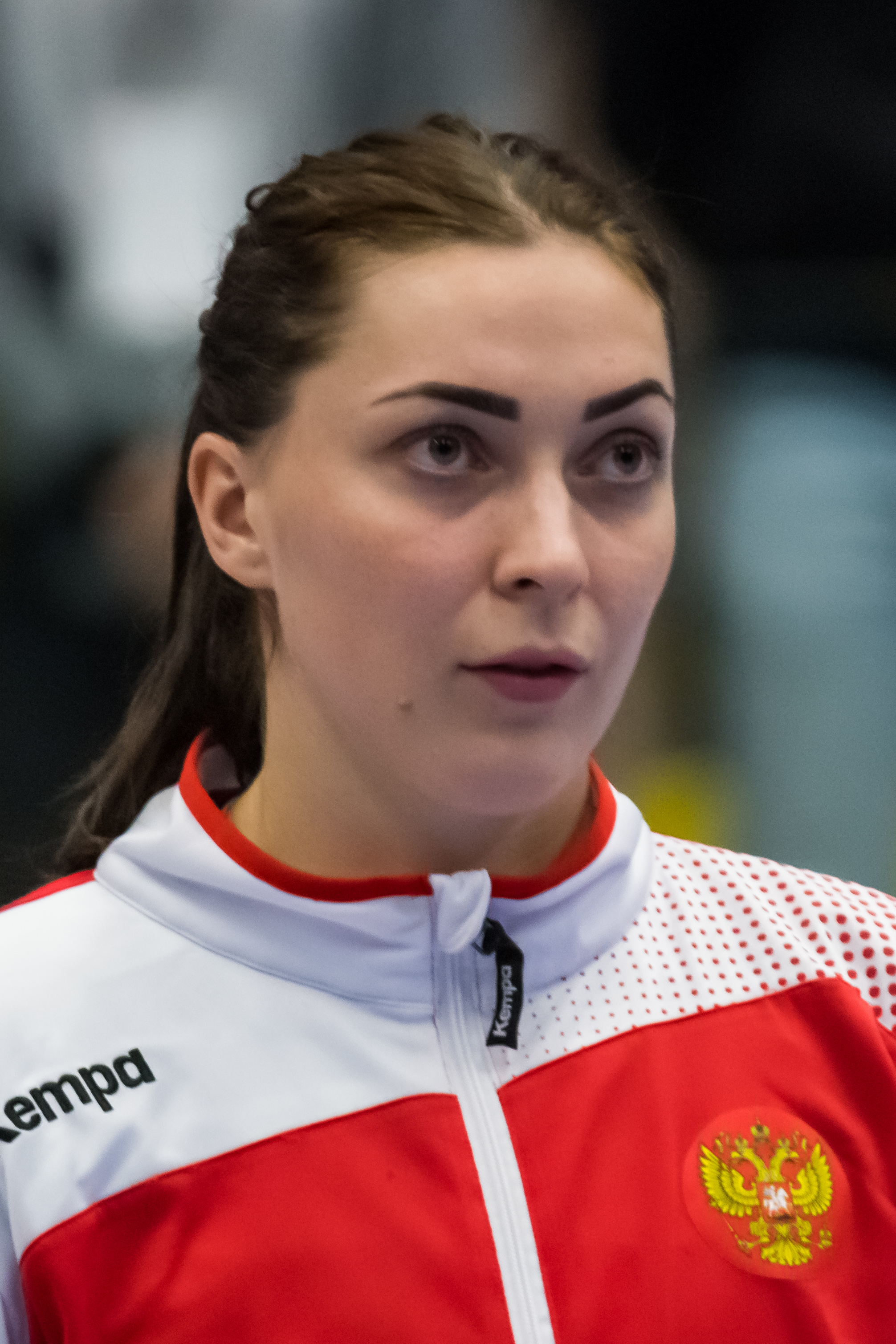
- Zhilinskaite in 2012

Personal information
- Full name: Victoria Yuryevna Zhilinskayte
- Nationality: Russian
- Born: 6 March 1989 (age 37) Uray, Russian SFSR, Soviet Union
- Height: 1.88 m (6 ft 2 in)

Sport
- Sport: Handball
- Position: Left back
- Current club: HC Kuban Krasnodar
- Number: 20

Senior clubs
- Years: Team
- 2004-2008: HC Ufa-Alissa
- 2008-2014: Handball Club Lada
- 2014-2016: HC Astrakhanochka
- 2016-2019: HC Kuban Krasnodar
- 2019-2020: CSKA Moscow
- 2020-: HC Kuban Krasnodar
National team
Years	Team	Apps	(Gls)
–	Russia	143	(203)
Medal record
Olympic Games
Gold medal – first place	2016 Rio de Janeiro	Team
World Championship
Gold medal – first place	2009 Beijing
European Championship
Bronze medal – third place	2008 Macedonia
- Updated on 24 August 2020

Victoria Yuryevna Zhilinskayte (Russian: Виктория Юрьевна Жилинскайте, Lithuanian: Viktorija Žilinskaitė; born 6 March 1989) is a Russian handball player for HC Kuban Krasnodar and the Russian national handball team. She is a World champion from 2009 and an Olympic champion from 2016.

She is of Lithuanian descent. Her twin sister, Yana Zhilinskayte, is also a handball player.

== National team ==
At the 2008 European Championship she won bronze medals with the Russian team. At the 2009 World Women's Handball Championship she reached the final and won the gold medal with the Russian team, defeating France. She competed at the 2011 World Women's Handball Championship in Brazil, where the Russian team placed 6th.

She also reprented Lithuania at the 2012 Olympics. At the 2016 Olympics she won gold medals with the Russian team.

Her last tournament for Russia was the 2016 European Championship in Sweden, where Russia finished 7th.

== Club career ==
Zhilinskayte played from 2004 to 2008 for HC Ufa-Alissa. She then joined Handball Club Lada, where she won the 2012 and 2014 EHF Cup.

In 2014 she joined HC Astrakhanochka. Here she won the 2016 Russian Championship. The following summer she joined HC Kuban Krasnodar.

In 2019 she joined CSKA Moscow for a single season, before returning to HC Kuban Krasnodar in 2020.
