= Anna Shaposhnikova =

Russian handball player

Personal information
- Nationality: Russian
- Born: 13 February 1999 (age 27) Astrakhan, Russia
- Height: 174 cm (69 in)

Sport
- Sport: Handball
- Position: Right back

Senior clubs
- Years: Team
- 2015-2023: HC Astrakhanochka
- 2023-2026: Rostov-Don
National team
- Years: Team
- –: Russia

Anna Shaposhnikova (born 13 February 1999) is a Russian handball player for HC Astrakhanochka and the Russian national team.

She was selected to represent Russia at the 2017 World Women's Handball Championship.
