= Jan Leslie =

Danish handball player and coach (born 1971)

Personal information
- Full name: Jan Leslie Petersen
- Nationality: Danish
- Born: 20 May 1971 (age 55) Esbjerg, Denmark

Sport
- Sport: Handball

Senior clubs
- Years: Team
- 1998–2000: Farsø KFUM
- 2000–2002: HF Mors

Teams managed
- 2002–2006: Team Esbjerg
- 2006–2007: Aalborg DH
- 2007–2009: Skjern Håndbold (assistant)
- 2009–2014: Randers HK
- 2014–2017: Rostov-Don
- 2017: Ribe-Esbjerg HH
- 2019–2021: CSKA Moscow
- 2021–2023: Horsens
- 2023–2026: Dunărea Brăila

Jan Leslie (born 20 May 1971) is a Danish handball coach and former player.

Previously he was head coach for Team Esbjerg between 2002 and 2006, and Randers HK from 2009 to 2014, where he won the first Danish Championship in 2012 to the club and qualification for the Women's EHF Champions League, the following season. He also won the 2009–10 Women's EHF Cup, after defeating CBF Elda in the final. In 2014 he was named Danish women's coach of the year by Dansk Håndbold.

In 2017 he was the coach of Ribe-Esbjerg HH, where he left in November on mutual consent. He was hired as new head coach for the new Russian handball club CSKA Moscow in July 2019. Only two years before he left Russia, after spending three years as head coach for Rostov-Don, where he won the Russian Championship in 2015.
