= HBC CSKA Moscow (women) =

Russian handball club

- Full name: HBC CSKA Moscow
- Short name: CSKA
- Founded: 2019
- Arena: Volleyball Arena Dinamo
- Capacity: 3,000
- Head coach: Lyudmila Bodniyeva
- League: Russian Super League
- 2023-2024: 1st
- Club colours
Home	Away

HBC CSKA Moscow (Russian: ПГК ЦСКА Москва) is a professional women's handball club from Moscow, Russia, that competes in the Russian Super League since season 2019–2020.

== Achievements ==
=== Russia ===
- Russian Super League:
  - Winners (3): 2020–21, 2022–23, 2023–24
  - Finalist (1): 2021-22
- Russian Cup
  - Winners (4): 2022, 2023, 2024, 2026
  - Finalist (1): 2020
- Russian Supercup
  - Winners (3): 2022, 2023, 2024
  - Finalist (2): 2020, 2021

=== Europe ===
- EHF Champions League:
  - Semifinalist: 2021

== Crest, colours, supporters ==
=== Kit manufacturers and shirt sponsor ===
The following table shows in detail HBC CSKA Moscow kit manufacturers and shirt sponsors by year:

Period	Kit manufacturer	Shirt sponsor
2019-2020	(Japan) Mizuno	Ruscon
2020-	(Germany) Puma	TransContainer

=== Kits ===
HOME
2019-20	2020-

AWAY
2019-20	2020-21	2021-

== Arena ==
- Name: Volleyball Arena Dinamo
- City: Moscow, Russia
- Capacity: 3,000 spectators

== Team ==
=== Current squad ===
Squad for the 2026–27 season

Goalkeepers

- 1 (Russia) Anna Vereshchak
- 16 (Russia) Evelina Anoshkina
- 99 (Russia) Polina Markina

Left wingers

- 19 (Russia) Yuliya Kozachenko
- 71 (Russia) Yekaterina Levchina
- 91 (Russia) Sofia Vasilyeva

Right wingers

- 4 (Russia) Valeriya Sobkalo
- 17 (Russia) Albina Murzaliyeva

Line players

- 20 (Belarus) Iriyna Shynkaruk
- 32 (Russia) Aleksandra Ostrovskaya
- 67 (Russia) Anastasia Illarionova

Left backs

- 8 (Russia) Varvara Syomina
- 28 (Russia) Elena Mikhaylichenko
- 30 (Russia) Alena Ikhneva

Centre backs

- 23 (Russia) Natalia Kuznetsova
- 25 (Russia) Karina Sabirova
- 26 (Russia) Yulia Krupennikova

Right backs

- 5 (Russia) Yuliya Bayeva
- 39 (Russia) Antonina Santalova
- 55 (Russia) Yulia Garyaeva
- 86 (Russia) Olga Yavon

=== Technical staff ===
Staff for the current season

- Head Coach: (Russia) Lyudmila Bodnieva
- Assistant of Head Coach: (Russia) Nataliya Derepasko
- Goalkeeping Coach: (Russia) Anna Sedoykina

=== Notable former club players ===
- (Russia) Victoria Zhilinskayte (2019–2020)
- (Russia) Yana Zhilinskayte (2019–2020)
- (Russia) Olga Gorshenina (2019–2021)
- (Russia) Elena Utkina (2019–2020)
- (Russia) Marina Sudakova (2020–2022)
- (Russia) Polina Vedekhina (2019–2022)
- (Russia) Anna Sedoykina (2020–2022)
- (Russia) Valeria Maslova (2022)
- (Brazil) Chana Masson (2019–2021)
- (Sweden) Sabina Jacobsen (2019–2021)
- (Denmark) Kathrine Heindahl (2020–2022)
- (Slovenia) Ana Gros (2021–2022)
- (Serbia) Dragana Cvijić (2021–2022)

== Head coach history ==
- (Denmark) Jan Leslie (2019–2021)
- (Russia) Olga Akopyan (2021) (interim)
- (Romania) Florentin Pera (2021–2022)
- (Russia) Olga Akopyan (2022–2024)
- (Russia) Oleg Kuleshov (July-October 2024)
- (Russia) Nadezhda Muravyova (November 2024-March 2025)
- (Russia) Lyudmila Bodnieva (2025-present)

== Statistics ==
=== Top scorers in the EHF Champions League ===
(All-Time) – Last updated on 20 February 2022

Rank	Name	Seasons played	Goals
1	(Russia) Ekaterina Ilina	2	101
2	(Russia) Antonina Skorobogatchenko	2	94
3	(North Macedonia) Sara Ristovska	2	93
4	(Russia) Daria Dmitrieva	2	91
5	(Russia) Elena Mikhaylichenko	2	89
6	(Russia) Polina Gorshkova	2	79
7	(Slovenia) Ana Gros	1	71
8	(Russia) Polina Vedekhina	2	68
9	(Denmark) Kathrine Heindahl	2	55
10	(Russia) Marina Sudakova	2	44

== European record ==
Season	Competition	Round	Club	1st leg	2nd leg	Aggregate
2020–21	Champions League	Group stage (Group B)	(Romania) SCM Râmnicu Vâlcea	30–20	34–24	2nd
2020–21	Champions League	Group stage (Group B)	(Hungary) Győri Audi ETO KC	27–27	24–31	2nd
2020–21	Champions League	Group stage (Group B)	(Montenegro) ŽRK Budućnost	25–22	27–23	2nd
2020–21	Champions League	Group stage (Group B)	(Germany) Borussia Dortmund	29–28	35–28	2nd
2020–21	Champions League	Group stage (Group B)	(France) Brest Bretagne Handball	30–28	25–24	2nd
2020–21	Champions League	Group stage (Group B)	(Denmark) Odense Håndbold	27–23	25–26	2nd
2020–21	Champions League	Group stage (Group B)	(Croatia) RK Podravka Koprivnica	30–26	36–20	2nd
2020–21	Champions League	Round of 16	(Slovenia) Krim Mercator	20–25	27–21	47–46
2020–21	Champions League	Quarter-finals	(Romania) CSM București	27–32	24–19	51–51
2020–21	Champions League	Semi-final	(Norway) Vipers Kristiansand	30–33		
2020–21	Champions League	Bronze-match	(Hungary) Győri Audi ETO KC	21–32		
2021–22	Champions League	Group stage (Group B)	(Norway) Vipers Kristiansand	27–24	28–32	4th
2021–22	Champions League	Group stage (Group B)	(Slovenia) RK Krim	21–21	21–24	4th
2021–22	Champions League	Group stage (Group B)	(Denmark) Odense Håndbold	21–28	27–27	4th
2021–22	Champions League	Group stage (Group B)	(Hungary) Győri Audi ETO KC	22–32	23–27	4th
2021–22	Champions League	Group stage (Group B)	(France) Metz Handball	32–24	27–26	4th
2021–22	Champions League	Group stage (Group B)	(Turkey) Kastamonu	34–27	31–29	4th
2021–22	Champions League	Group stage (Group B)	(Sweden) IK Savehof	29–28	32–23	4th
2021–22	Champions League	Playoffs	(Romania) CSM București	0–10	0–10	0–20
