= Anastasiia Illarionova =

Russian handball player

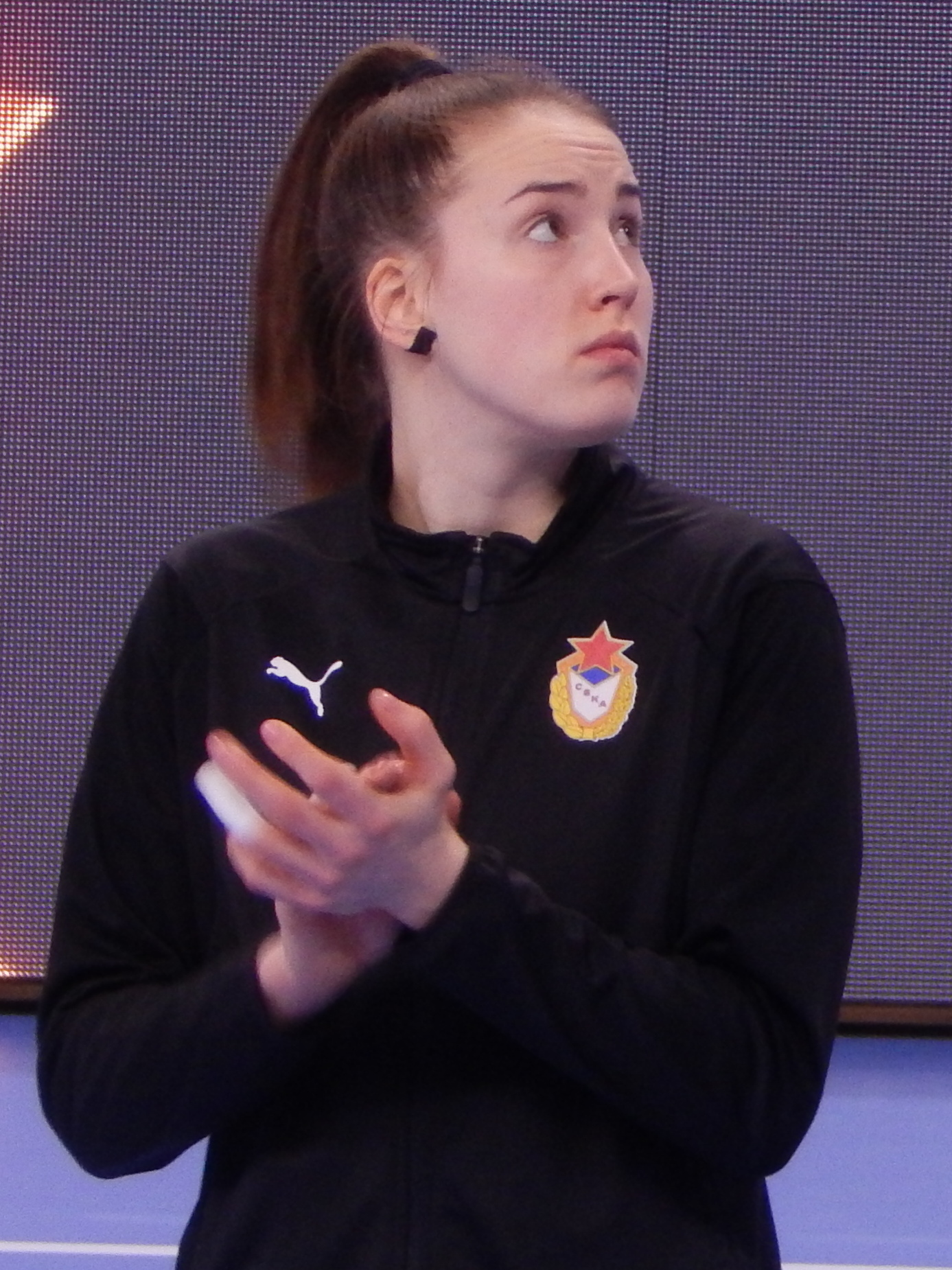
- Illarionova in 2021

Personal information
- Nationality: Russian
- Born: 28 March 1999 (age 27) Istra, Russia
- Height: 1.80 m (5 ft 11 in)

Sport
- Sport: Handball
- Position: Pivot
- Current club: HC Astrakhanochka
- Number: 67

Senior clubs
- Years: Team
- 2017–2020: Zvezda Zvenigorod
- 2020–2022: CSKA Moscow
- 2022–: HC Astrakhanochka
National team
Years	Team	Apps	(Gls)
2019–	Russia	23	(14)
Medal record
World Championship
Bronze medal – third place	2019 Japan

Anastasiia Illarionova (Russian: Анастасия Илларионова; born 28 March 1999) is a Russian handball player for HC Astrakhanochka and the Russian national handball team.

She represented Russia at the 2019 World Women's Handball Championship.
