= Anna Sedoykina =

Russian handball player (born 1984)

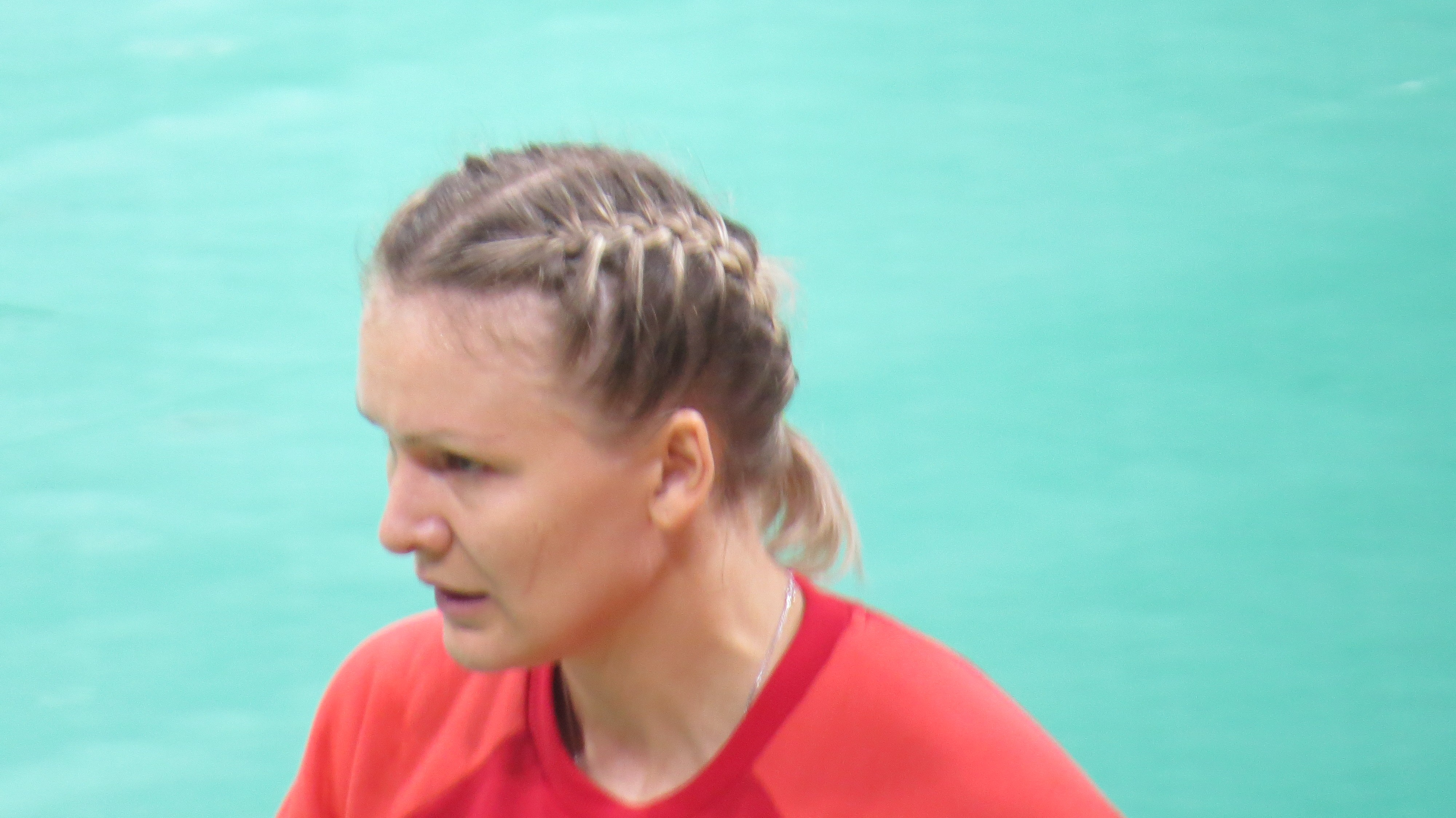
- Sedoykina in 2016

Personal information
- Full name: Anna Sergeyevna Sedoykina
- Nationality: Russian
- Born: 1 August 1984 (age 42) Volgograd, Russia
- Height: 1.85 m (6 ft 1 in)

Sport
- Sport: Handball
- Position: Goalkeeper
- Current club: CSKA Moscow
- Number: 21

Senior clubs
- Years: Team
- 2000–2015: Akva Volgograd
- 2015–2020: Rostov-Don
- 2020–2022: CSKA Moscow
National team
Years	Team	Apps	(Gls)
2004–2022	Russia	168	(9)

Teams managed
- 2024–: CSKA Moscow (GK Coach)
Medal record
Representing ROC
Olympic Games
Silver medal – second place	2020 Tokyo	Team
Representing Russia
Olympic Games
Gold medal – first place	2016 Rio de Janeiro	Team
World Championship
Gold medal – first place	2009 China	Team
Bronze medal – third place	2019 Japan	Team
European Championship
Silver medal – second place	2018 France	Team
Bronze medal – third place	2008 Macedonia	Team
World Junior Championship
Gold medal – first place	2003 Macedonia	Team
European Junior Championship
Gold medal – first place	2002 Finland	Team
European Youth Championship
Gold medal – first place	2001 Turkey	Team

Anna Sergeyevna Sedoykina (Russian: Анна Сергеевна Седойкина, IPA: [ˈanːə sʲɪˈdojkʲɪnə]; born 1 August 1984) is a Russian former handball player who retired in 2022 while playing for CSKA Moscow. She also played for the Russian national handball team.

She was part of the Russian team that won the 2009 World Championship. She also received a bronze medal with the Russian team at the 2008 European Championship in Macedonia.

== Career ==
Sedoykina started her career at Akva Volgograd, where she won the 2008 EHF Cup and the 2001, 2009, 2010, 2011, and 2012 Russian Championship. She also reached the final four of the 2014-15 Champions League.

In 2015, she joined Rostov-Don. Here, she won the 2017 EHF Cup and the Russian Championship every year from 2016-17 to 2019-20.

In 2020, she joined CSKA Moscow. With the Moscow club, she won the 2021 Russian Championship and 2022 Russian Cup. After the 2021-22 season, she retired.

From March 2024, she has been the Goalkeeping Coach at her former club CSKA Moscow.

== National team ==
Sedoykina was part of the Russian team that won bronze medals at the 2008 European Championship. A year later she won gold medals at the 2009 World Championship.

She also represented Russia at the 2012 Olympics and at the 2014 European Championship. At the 2016 Olympics she won Gold medals with the Russian team.

Two years later she won a silver medal at the 2018 European Championship, losing to France 21-24. A year later she won bronze medals at the 2019 World Championship, beating Norway in the third place playoff.

At the 2020 Olympics she won silver medals, once again losing to France in the final. The result was 25-30. Sedoykina had over the course of the tournament a save percentage of 29%.

== Individual awards ==
- Carpathian Trophy Best Goalkeeper: 2018
