= Yekaterina Atkova =

Russian handball player

Personal information
- Nationality: Russian
- Born: 20 April 1985 (age 41) Saint Petersburg, Russia
- Height: 1.70 m (5 ft 7 in)

Sport
- Sport: Handball
- Position: Right wing
- Current club: KSK Luch Moscow
National team
- Years: Team
- –: Russia

Yekaterina Atkova (Russian: Екатерина Атькова; born 20 April 1985) is a Russian handball player who plays for the club KSK Luch Moscow. She is also member of the Russian national team. She competed at the 2015 World Women's Handball Championship in Denmark.
