= Natalia Parhomenko =

Ukrainian handball player

Personal information
- Nationality: Ukrainian
- Born: 21 March 1979 (age 47) Kryvyi Rih, Ukraine
- Height: 1.80 m (5 ft 11 in)

Sport
- Sport: Handball
- Position: Goalkeeper
- Current club: HC Kuban Krasnodar
- Number: 16

Senior clubs
- Years: Team
- 2000–2008: HC Motor
- 2008–2011: HC Smart
- 2011–2012: CSM Bacău 2010
- 2012–: HC Kuban Krasnodar
National team
| Years | Team | Apps | (Gls) |
| – | Ukraine | 33 | (0) |

Natalia Parhomenko (née Vysotska; born 21 March 1979) is a Ukrainian handballer playing for HC Kuban Krasnodar and the Ukrainian national team.
