= Irina Bliznova =

Russian handball player

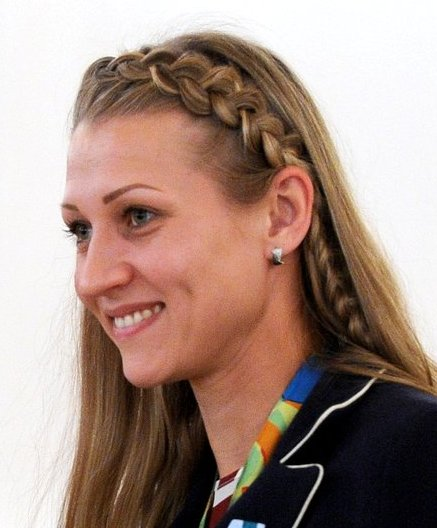
- Bliznova in 2016

Personal information
- Full name: Irina Yuryevna Bliznova
- Nationality: Russian
- Born: 6 October 1986 (age 40) Krasnodar, Russia
- Height: 1.82 m (6 ft 0 in)

Sport
- Sport: Handball
- Position: Right back
- Current club: Lada Togliatti
- Number: 6

Senior clubs
- Years: Team
- 2004-2012: Lada Togliatti
- 2014-2016: Lada Togliatti
- 2019-2020: Lada Togliatti
National team
Years	Team	Apps	(Gls)
2005–2016	Russia	124	(369)
Medal record
Olympic Games
Gold medal – first place	2016 Rio de Janeiro	Team
Silver medal – second place	2008 Beijing	Team
World Championship
Gold medal – first place	2005 Russia
Gold medal – first place	2007 France
European Championship
Silver medal – second place	2006 Sweden

Irina Yuryevna Bliznova (Russian: Ирина Юрьевна Близнова, born 6 October 1986) is a Russian former handball player, who played for Lada Togliatti her entire career. She won the gold medal at the 2005 and 2007 world championships and 2016 Rio Olympics, placing second in 2008 and eighth in 2012. She announced her retirement shortly after the 2016 Olympics, but unretired for the 2019-20 season. After the season she retired for good. She won the 2005, 2006 and 2008 Russian championships, and reached the final of the 2007 EHF Champions League.

In April 2021 she became the director at her former club. At the same time she also works as a youth coach at the club.

Bliznova is married to Alexander and has a daughter Arina (born 2010) and a son Arkhip (born 2014).
