= Tatiana Erokhina =

Russian handball goalkeeper

Tatyana Yerokhina
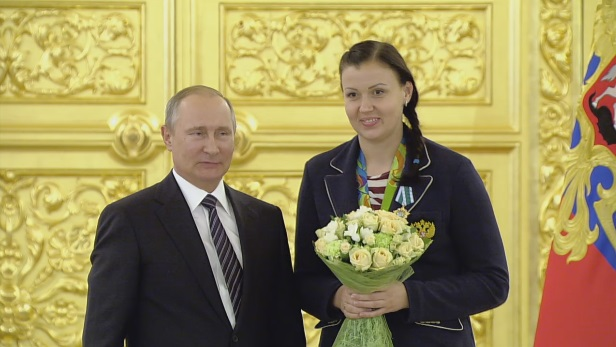
- Yerokhina with Vladimir Putin in 2016

Personal information
- Nationality: Russian
- Born: 7 September 1984 (age 42) Chelyabinsk, Russia
- Height: 1.85 m (6 ft 1 in)

Sport
- Sport: Handball
- Position: Goalkeeper
- Number: 1

Senior clubs
- Years: Team
- 2001-2016: Lada Togliatti
National team
| Years | Team | | |
| – | Kazakhstan | | |
| – | Russia | 21 | (0) |

Teams managed
- 2019-2022: Lada Togliatti (GK Coach)
- 2022-2024: Russia Youth National Team (GK Coach)
Medal record
Olympic Games
| Gold medal – first place | 2016 Rio de Janeiro | Team |

Tatyana Vladimirovna Yerokhina (Russian: Татьяна Владимировна Ерохина, born on 7 September 1984) is a Russian former handball goalkeeper and current goalkeeping coach. She played for the club Lada Togliatti her entire career. As a member of the Russian national team, she competed at the 2015 World Women's Handball Championship and 2016 Summer Olympics, winning a gold medal in the latter. Before playing for Russia, she had also represented the Kazakhstan national team at the 2011 World Women's Handball Championship. She retired after the 2016 Olympics.

From the 2019–20 season she was the goalkeeping coach at Lada Togliatti until the 2022–23 season. She then became the goalkeeping coach at the Russian youth national team. She stopped in this position in 2024.

Yerokhina is married to Pavel and has a daughter Alena (born 2 July 2013). In 2006, she graduated from Togliatti State University.
