= Karina Sisenova =

Russian-Kazakhstani handball player

Personal information
- Full name: Karina Sisenova
- Nationality: Russian
- Born: 25 June 1996 (age 30) Astrakhan, Russia
- Height: 1.77 m (5 ft 10 in)

Sport
- Sport: Handball
- Position: Right back
- Current club: HC Astrakhanochka
- Number: 2

Senior clubs
- Years: Team
- 2012–: HC Astrakhanochka
National team
- Years: Team
- 2016–: Russia
Medal record
Junior World Championship
Silver medal – second place	2016 Russia
European Junior Championship
Silver medal – second place	2015 Spain
European Youth Championship
Silver medal – second place	2013 Poland
European Youth Olympic Festival
Silver medal – second place	2013 Utrecht

Karina Sisenova (Kazakh: Карина Досжанқызы Сисенова born 25 June 1996) is a Russian-Kazakh handballer who plays for HC Astrakhanochka and the Russian national team.

== Achievements ==
- Russian Super League:
  - Winner: 2016
