= Russian Women's Handball Cup =

- Founded: 2005
- Country: Russia
- Confederation: EHF (Europe)
- Most recent champion: CSKA Moscow (2025–26)
- Most titles: Rostov-Don (12 titles)
- Level on pyramid: 1
- International cup: EHF Cup
- 2021–22 season

The Russian Women's Handball Cup or in russian (Кубок России по гандболу среди женщин) is the second most important women's handball competition for clubs in russia after the Russian Women's Handball Super League it was introduced first in the 2005/2006 season.

== Winners list ==
Years	Host	Winners	Runners-up	Third placed
2006	Togliatti	Lada Togliatti	Zvezda Zvenigorod	HC Astrakhanochka
2007	Rostov-on-Don	Rostov-Don	Lada Togliatti	Kuban Krasnodar
2008	Rostov-on-Don	Rostov-Don	KSK Luch Moscow	Not Disputed
2009	Rostov-on-Don	Zvezda Zvenigorod	Lada Togliatti	Dinamo Volgograd
2010	Zvenigorod	Zvezda Zvenigorod	Rostov-Don	Lada Togliatti
2011	Rostov-on-Don	Zvezda Zvenigorod	Rostov-Don	Kuban Krasnodar
2012	Rostov-on-Don	Rostov-Don	Zvezda Zvenigorod	Lada Togliatti
2013	Rostov-on-Don	Rostov-Don	Zvezda Zvenigorod	Lada Togliatti
2014	Zvenigorod	Zvezda Zvenigorod	Kuban Krasnodar	Lada Togliatti
2015	Rostov-on-Don	Rostov-Don	Lada Togliatti	Zvezda Zvenigorod
2016	Astrakhan	Rostov-Don	HC Astrakhanochka	Kuban Krasnodar
2017	Rostov-on-Don	Rostov-Don	Kuban Krasnodar	HC Astrakhanochka
2018	Rostov-on-Don	Rostov-Don	Kuban Krasnodar	HC Astrakhanochka
2019	Rostov-on-Don	Rostov-Don	Lada Togliatti	Zvezda Zvenigorod
2020	Moscow	Rostov-Don	CSKA Moscow	HC Astrakhanochka
2021	Rostov-on-Don	Rostov-Don	Lada Togliatti	HC Astrakhanochka
2022	Krasnodar	CSKA Moscow	Rostov-Don	Zvezda Zvenigorod
2023	Togliatti	CSKA Moscow	Lada Togliatti	Rostov-Don
2024	Rostov-on-Don	CSKA Moscow	Rostov-Don	Dinamo Volgograd
2025	Astrakhan	Rostov-Don	CSKA Moscow	Black Sea
2026	Moscow	CSKA Moscow	Rostov-Don	Zvezda Zvenigorod

== Titles by club ==
Rk.	Club	Titles	Years won
1	Rostov-Don	11	2007, 2008, 2012, 2013, 2015, 2016, 2017, 2018, 2019, 2020, 2021
2	Zvezda Zvenigorod	4	2009, 2010, 2011, 2014
3	CSKA Moscow	3	2022, 2023, 2024
4	Lada Togliatti	1	2006
