= Handball Club Lada =

- Full name: Handball Club Lada
- Short name: Lada
- Founded: 1998
- Arena: Olymp Sportlomplex, Togliatti
- Capacity: 2,700
- President: Irina Bliznova
- Head coach: Alexey Alekseev
- League: Russian Super League
- 2021–22: 3rd
- Club colours
Home	Away

Location of HC Lada

Handball Club Lada is a Russian women's handball club from Tolyatti playing in the Russian Super League.

Founded in 1998, Lada became the leading team in the Super League winning five championships in a row between 2002 and 2006 and a sixth one in 2008. It also built itself a name in Europe winning the 2002 Cup Winners' Cup in its international debut and reaching the final of the 2007 Champions League and the next edition's semifinals.

The following three seasons were less successful, with Dynamo Volgograd retrieving the leading position. On the other hand, Lada won the 2012 EHF Cup, its second international title, while attaining the national championship's bronze in 2009, 2011 and 2012.

In reaction to the 2022 Russian invasion of Ukraine, the International Handball Federation banned Russian athletes, and the European Handball Federation suspended the Russian clubs from competing in European handball competitions.

== Titles ==
- Russian Super League
  - Gold: 2002, 2003, 2004, 2005, 2006, 2008
  - Silver: 2001, 2007, 2014, 2015, 2017, 2018, 2019
  - Bronze: 2009, 2011, 2012, 2016, 2021
- Russian Cup
  - Gold: 2006
  - Silver: 2007, 2009, 2015, 2019, 2021, 2023
  - Bronze: 2010, 2012, 2013, 2014
- Champions League
  - Finalist: 2007
- Cup Winners' Cup
  - Winner: 2002
- EHF Cup
  - Winner: 2012, 2014

== European record ==
Season	Competition	Round	Club	1st leg	2nd leg	Aggregate
2016–17	EHF Cup	R2	(Norway) Vipers Kristiansand	29–23	26–32	55–55
2016–17	EHF Cup	R3	(Denmark) Viborg	29–26	28–22	57–48
2016–17	EHF Cup	Group D	(Denmark) Nykøbing Falster	35–32	23–35	3rd place
2016–17	EHF Cup	Group D	(Germany) Metzingen	26–27	24–23	3rd place
2016–17	EHF Cup	Group D	(Norway) Glassverket	32–21	25–26	3rd place

=== Kits ===
AWAY
2019–20	2020-

== Team ==
=== Current squad ===
Squad for the 2021–22 season

Goalkeepers

- 16 (Belarus) Valiantsina Voitulevich
- 31 (Russia) Daria Dereven

Wingers
RW

- 2 (Russia) Olga Fomina
- 77 (Russia) Anastasiya Novoselova

LW

- 22 (Russia) Natalia Reshetnikova
- 28 (Russia) Alena Nosikova
- 47 (Russia) Valentina Barynina

Line players

- 4 (Russia) Yana Zhilinskayte
- 7 (Russia) Julia Kakmolja
- 75 (Russia) Alena Amelchenko

Back players
LB

- 78 (Russia) Irina Nikitina
- 23 (Russia) Anna Golubeva

CB

- 14 (Russia) Veronika Nikitina
- 25 (Russia) Olga Sherbak
- 35 (Russia) Valeriia Kirdiasheva
- 36 (Russia) Anastasia Portyagina
- 88 (Russia) Arishina Liubov

RB

- 29 (Russia) Valeriya Ganicheva

=== Transfers ===
Transfers for the 2022–23 season

Joining

- (Russia) Karina Sisenova (RB) (from (Russia) HC Astrakhanochka)

Leaving

=== Staff members ===
Staff for the 2021-22 season.

- (Russia) President: Irina Bliznova
- (Russia) Head coach: Alexey Alekseev
- (Russia) Assistant coach: Yekaterina Marennikova
- (Russia) Assistant/Goalkeeping coach: Tatiana Erokhina

== Notable former players ==
- (Russia) Yekaterina Marennikova (2004-2010, 2011-2012)
- (Russia) Nadezhda Muravyeva (2002-2010, 2011-2015)
- (Russia) Natalya Shipilova (2001-2006, 2010-2013)
- (Russia) Irina Bliznova (2004-2012, 2014, 2016, 2019-)
- (Russia) Olga Chernoivanenko (2008-2014, 2018-)
- (Russia) Ekaterina Davydenko (2006-2014, 2018-)
- (Russia) Daria Dmitrieva (2015-2019)
- (Russia) Tatiana Erokhina (2002-2013, 2014-2016)
- (Russia) Oksana Korolyova (2001-2002, 2002-2007)
- (Russia) Yekaterina Atkova (2008-2009)
- (Russia) Mariya Basarab (2008-2014)
- (Russia) Yelena Dmitriyeva (2001-2004)
- (Russia) Tatyana Dronina (2010-2011)
- (Russia) Olga Gorshenina (2009-2014)
- (Russia) Elena Utkina (2015-2019)
- (Russia) Anna Kareyeva (2001-2004)
- (Russia) Yekaterina Ilyina (2013-2013)
- (Russia) Olga Akopyan (2015-2016)
- (Russia) Elizaveta Malashenko (2013-2017)
- (Russia) Irina Nikitina (2006-2013)
- (Russia) Irina Poltoratskaya (2001-2004)
- (Russia) Lyudmila Postnova (2003-2010)
- (Russia) Daria Samokhina (2007-2017)
- (Russia) Mariya Sidorova (2001-2012)
- (Russia) Irina Snopova (2016-2018)
- (Russia) Inna Suslina (2001-2014)
- (Russia) Polina Vyakhireva (2004-2007)
- (Russia) Victoria Zhilinskayte (2008-2014)
- (Russia) Yana Zhilinskayte (2008-2014)
- (Norway) June Andenæs (2013–2014)
- (Ukraine) Natalia Parhomenko (2013-2014)
- (Ukraine) Yuliya Andriychuk (2013-2014)

== Kit manufacturers ==
- (Germany) Kempa
