= Yana Zhilinskayte =

Russian handball player (born 1989)

Personal information
- Nationality: Russian
- Born: 6 March 1989 (age 37) Uray, Russian SFSR, Soviet Union
- Height: 1.85 m (6 ft 1 in)

Sport
- Sport: Handball
- Position: Pivot
- Current club: Handball Club Lada
- Number: 4
National team
Years	Team	Apps	(Gls)
–	Russia	48	(36)
Medal record
World Championship
Bronze medal – third place	2019 Japan

Yana Yuryevna Zhilinskayte (Russian: Яна Юрьевна Жилинскайте, Lithuanian: Janina Žilinskaitė; born 6 March 1989) is a Russian handball player for Handball Club Lada and the Russian national team. She is the twin sister of fellow handballer Victoria Zhilinskayte.

She participated at the 2016 European Women's Handball Championship.
