= Soviet Women's Handball Championship =

The Soviet Women's Handball Championship (Чемпионат СССР по гандболу среди женщин) was the premier women's handball championship in the Soviet Union. Founded in 1962, it last took place in 1992 following the state's collapse.

Luch Moscow (previously Trud) and Žalgiris Kaunas were early powerhouses of the championship. Spartak Kiev subsequently dominated the championship for two decades, with twenty titles in a row between 1969 and 1988. The four last editions were won by Kuban Krasnodar and Rostselmash. Avtomobilist Baku was the championship's runner-up a record 9 times, but wasn't able to win it.

The Soviet Championship was arguably one of the top women's handball competitions in the world. Spartak Kiev extended its dominance to the European Cup with 13 titles, and Avtomobilist Baku, Eglė Vilnius, Kuban Krasnodar, Luch Moscow, Rostselmash and Žalgiris Kaunas also won international competitions.

== List of champions ==
- 1962: (Russian Soviet Federative Socialist Republic) Trud Moscow
- 1963: (Russian Soviet Federative Socialist Republic) Trud Moscow
- 1964: (Russian Soviet Federative Socialist Republic) Trud Moscow
- 1965: (Russian Soviet Federative Socialist Republic) Trud Moscow
- 1966: (Lithuanian Soviet Socialist Republic) Žalgiris Kaunas
- 1967: (Lithuanian Soviet Socialist Republic) Žalgiris Kaunas
- 1968: (Russian Soviet Federative Socialist Republic) Luch Moscow
- 1969: (Ukrainian Soviet Socialist Republic) Spartak Kiev
- 1970: (Ukrainian Soviet Socialist Republic) Spartak Kiev
- 1971: (Ukrainian Soviet Socialist Republic) Spartak Kiev
- 1972: (Ukrainian Soviet Socialist Republic) Spartak Kiev
- 1973: (Ukrainian Soviet Socialist Republic) Spartak Kiev
- 1974: (Ukrainian Soviet Socialist Republic) Spartak Kiev
- 1975: (Ukrainian Soviet Socialist Republic) Spartak Kiev
- 1976: (Ukrainian Soviet Socialist Republic) Spartak Kiev
- 1977: (Ukrainian Soviet Socialist Republic) Spartak Kiev
- 1978: (Ukrainian Soviet Socialist Republic) Spartak Kiev
- 1979: (Ukrainian Soviet Socialist Republic) Spartak Kiev
- 1980: (Ukrainian Soviet Socialist Republic) Spartak Kiev
- 1981: (Ukrainian Soviet Socialist Republic) Spartak Kiev
- 1982: (Ukrainian Soviet Socialist Republic) Spartak Kiev
- 1983: (Ukrainian Soviet Socialist Republic) Spartak Kiev
- 1984: (Ukrainian Soviet Socialist Republic) Spartak Kiev
- 1985: (Ukrainian Soviet Socialist Republic) Spartak Kiev
- 1986: (Ukrainian Soviet Socialist Republic) Spartak Kiev
- 1987: (Ukrainian Soviet Socialist Republic) Spartak Kiev
- 1988: (Ukrainian Soviet Socialist Republic) Spartak Kiev
- 1989: (Russian Soviet Federative Socialist Republic) Kuban Krasnodar
- 1990: (Russian Soviet Federative Socialist Republic) Rostselmash
- 1991: (Russian Soviet Federative Socialist Republic) Rostselmash
- 1992: (Russia) Kuban Krasnodar
