= Olympus Arena =

Indoor sports arena in Krasnodar, Russia

Palace of Sports Olimp
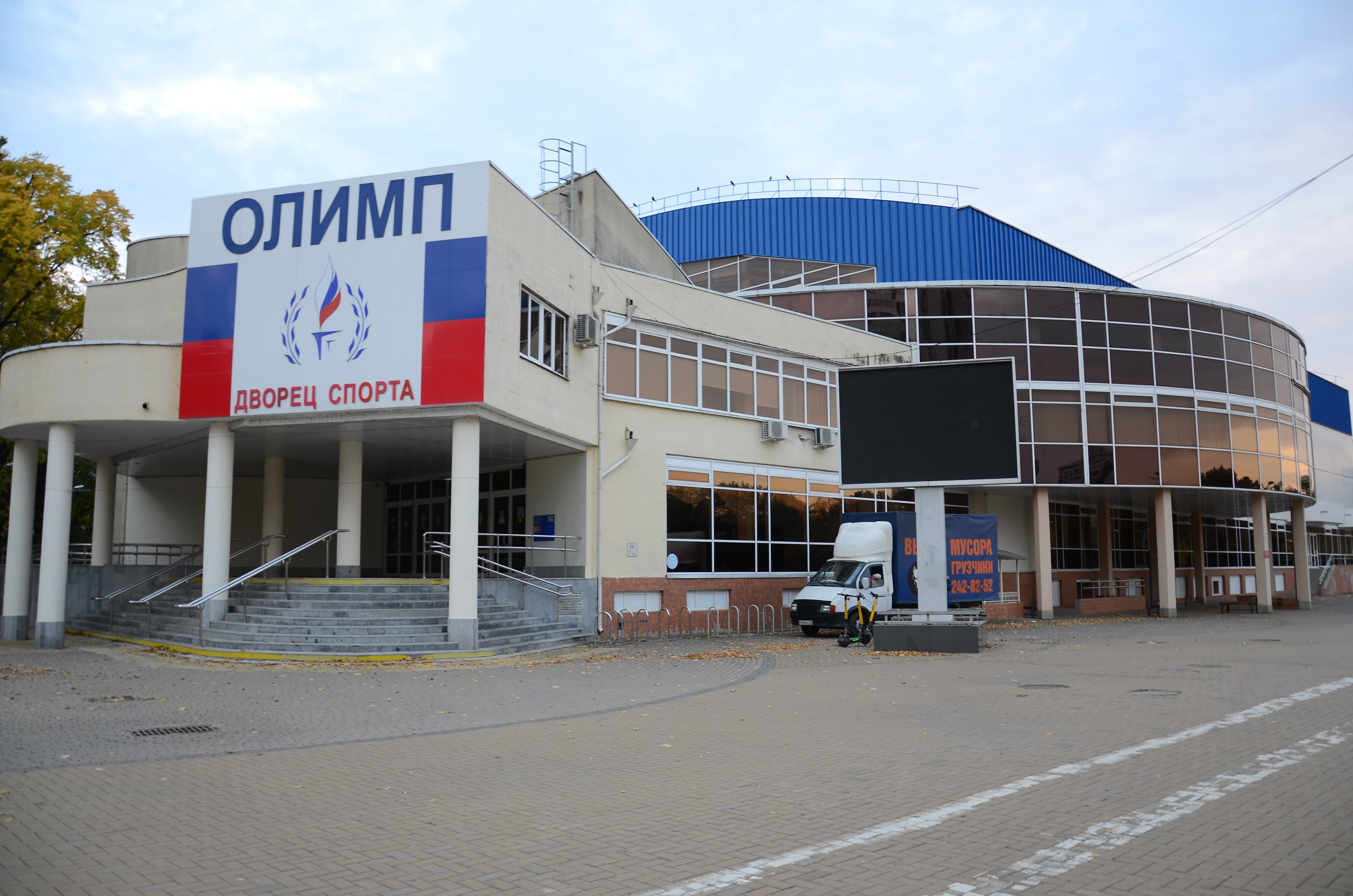
- Interactive map of Palace of Sports Olimp
- Address: Beregovaya ulitsa 144, Krasnodar, Russia
- Coordinates: 45.016349°N 38.955816°E
- Owner: City of Krasnodar
- Capacity: 3,000

Tenants
- Dinamo Krasnodar (men and women); Kuban Krasnodar; SKIF Krasnodar

The Palace of Sports Olimp (Russian: Дворец спорта «Олимп»), also known as Olimp Palace of Sport, Sports Palace Olimp and Olympus Arena is a sports complex in Krasnodar, Russia. Its 6,000 square metres contains fitness rooms, conference hall, food service areas and a 3,000 seat multi-purpose arena.

It is the home venue of volleyball club Dinamo Krasnodar (both men's team and women's team) and handball clubs Kuban Krasnodar and SKIF Krasnodar. It used to be the home venue of basketball club PBC Lokomotiv-Kuban before they move to a larger venue in 2011.

== See also ==
- Basket-Hall Krasnodar
