= KSK Luch Moscow =

Russian women's handball club

- Full name: KSK Luch Moscow
- Founded: 1959
- Arena: Dynamo Arena, Moscow
- Capacity: 4,400
- Head coach: Aleksandra Nikishova
- League: Russian Super League
- 2010-11: 6th
- Club colours
Home	Away

KSK Luch Moscow is a Russian women's handball club from Moscow. Founded in 1959 as Trud Moscow, it took its current name in 1966.

The team enjoyed its golden era in the 1960s, winning the third edition of the European Cup and five of the seven first editions of the Soviet Championship. Luch gradually declined in subsequent years, making it into the championship's top three for the last time in 1975.

Following the break-up of the Soviet Union Luch has played in the Russian Super League. The team has appeared occasionally in European competitions since, with the 1998 Cup Winners' Cup's quarter-finals and the 2001 Challenge Cup's semifinals as its best results. It last appeared in the 2009 Cup Winners' Cup. Most recently it was 7th in the 2012 championship's regular stage.

In reaction to the 2022 Russian invasion of Ukraine, the International Handball Federation banned Russian athletes, and the European Handball Federation suspended the Russian clubs from competing in European handball competitions.

== Titles ==
- European Cup
  - Winner (1): 1963
- Soviet Championship
  - Winner (5): 1962, 1963, 1964, 1965, 1968
- Russian Cup
  - Runner-up (1): 2008
