= HC Astrakhanochka =

- Full name: Handball Club Astrakhanochka
- Short name: HC Astrakhanochka
- Founded: 1993
- Arena: Sportcomplex Zvezdny, Astrakhan
- Capacity: 5,000
- Head coach: Mikhail Izmailov
- League: Super League
- 2020–21: 4th
- Club colours
| Home | Away |

Handball Club Astrakhanochka is a Russian women's handball club from Astrakhan established in 1993. It has played in the Russian Super League since 1999, and in 2004 it made its debut in EHF competitions. It reached the EHF Cup's semifinals in 2014 and the Cup Winners' Cup's quarterfinals in 2007.

In reaction to the 2022 Russian invasion of Ukraine, the International Handball Federation banned Russian athletes, and the European Handball Federation suspended the Russian clubs from competing in European handball competitions.

== Titles ==
- Russian Championship
  - Winner: 2016
  - Third-place: 2015, 2018, 2024
- Russian Cup
  - Second place: 2016
  - Third place: 2006, 2017, 2018, 2020, 2021

== Kits ==
HOME
| 2016–17 | 2020- |

== European record ==
| Season | Competition | Round | Club | 1st leg | 2nd leg | Aggregate |
|---|---|---|---|---|---|---|
| 2016–17 | EHF Champions League | Group B | (Hungary) Ferencváros | 28–33 | 23–32 | 3rd place |
| 2016–17 | EHF Champions League | Group B | (North Macedonia) Vardar Skopje | 26–31 | 25–39 | 3rd place |
| 2016–17 | EHF Champions League | Group B | (Germany) Leipzig | 27–24 | 27–30 | 3rd place |
| 2016–17 | EHF Champions League | Group 1 | (Montenegro) Budućnost Podgorica | 21–34 | 20–38 | 6th place |
| 2016–17 | EHF Champions League | Group 1 | (Germany) Thüringer | 26–24 | 22–34 | 6th place |
| 2016–17 | EHF Champions League | Group 1 | (France) Metz | 20–28 | 18–37 | 6th place |

== Team ==
=== Current squad ===
Squad for the 2021–22 season

Goalkeepers

- 1 (Russia) Anastasiia Riabtseva
- 12 (Russia) Anna Prokopeva
- 16 (Russia) Evelina Anoshkina
- 31 (Russia) Tamara Gobadze

Wingers
LW

- 5 (Russia) Ekaterina Fanina
- 28 (Russia) Galina Nikiforova
- 55 (Russia) Viktoria Shichkina
- 91 (Russia) Kristina Tarasova

RW

- 9 (Russia) Oksana Bessalaia
- 71 (Russia) Anna Kainarova
- 64 (Russia) Mariia Dudina

Line players

- 3 (Russia) Varvara Iureva
- 14 (Russia) Ksenia Zakordonskaya
- 19 (Russia) Svetlana Kremneva
- 67 (Russia) Anastasia Illarionova

Back players
LB

- 27 (Russia) Galina Izmailova
- 33 (Russia) Sofia Romanenko
- 77 (Russia) Viktoriya Divak

CB

- 10 (Russia) Kseniia Iliina
- 24 (Russia) Violetta Goletc
- 25 (Russia) Anastasiia Listopad
- 34 (Russia) Elizaveta Malashenko

RB

- 7 (Russia) Karina Sisenova
- 13 (Russia) Anna Shaposhnikova
- 87 (Russia) Irina Korneeva

=== Transfers ===
Transfers for the 2022-23 season

Joining

- (Kazakhstan) Irina Alexandrova (LB) (from (Kazakhstan) USC Dostyk)

Leaving

- (Russia) Karina Sisenova (RB) (to (Russia) HC Lada)
