= Russian Women's Handball Super League =

Premier women's handball competition in Russia

- Founded: 1993
- No. of teams: 12
- Country: Russia
- Confederation: EHF (Europe)
- Most recent champions: CSKA Moscow (3rd title)
- Most titles: Dinamo Volgograd (12 titles)
- Website: rushandball.ru

The Russian Women's Handball Superleague is the premier women's handball competition in Russia. Currently eleven clubs take part in the competition, with the top eight playing the championship play-offs.

The Russian Championship's leading teams have been successful in EHF's competitions. Zvezda Zvenigorod won the Champions League and the EHF Cup, while Dynamo Volgograd, Istochnik Rostov and Lada Togliatti have won either the EHF Cup or the Cup Winners' Cup. Kuban Krasnodar, Luch Moscow (f. Trud) and Rostselmash also won international competitions back in the Soviet era.

In reaction to the 2022 Russian invasion of Ukraine, the International Handball Federation banned Russian and Belarus athletes and officials, and the European Handball Federation suspended the national teams of Russia and Belarus as well as Russian and Belarusian clubs competing in European handball competitions. Referees, officials, and commission members from Russia and Belarus will not be called upon for future activities. And new organisers will be sought for the YAC 16 EHF Beach Handball EURO and the Qualifier Tournaments for the Beach Handball EURO 2023, which were to be held in Moscow.

== Teams ==
Teams in the 2021-22 season.

Team	City	Arena	Capacity
Rostov-Don	Rostov on Don	Rostov-on-Don Palace of Sports	3,000
CSKA Moscow	Moscow	Universal Sports Hall CSKA	5,500
Lada Togliatti	Tolyatti	Olymp Sportlomplex	2,700
Dinamo Volgograd	Volgograd	Dynamo Sports Hall	1,500
HC Kuban Krasnodar	Krasnodar	Olympus Arena	3,000
HC Astrakhanochka	Astrakhan	Sportcomplex Zvezdny	5,000
Zvezda Zvenigorod	Zvenigorod	Sport Hall Zvezda	1,000
Stavropol-SKFU	Stavropol	Arena Mezzanine Stavropol	1,000
AGU-Adyif Maykop	Maykop	Sports Palace of ASU	1,500
KSK Luch Moscow	Moscow	Dynamo Arena	4,400
Universitet-Izhevsk	Izhevsk	University Izhevsk Gymnasium	600
HC Ufa-Alisa	Ufa	MBU Sports Center °32	200

== List of champions ==
Season	(gold) Gold	(silver) Silver	(bronze) Bronze
1992–93	Rotor Volgograd (1)	Rostselmash (1)	Rossiyanka Volgograd (1)
1993–94	Rostselmash (1)	Rossiyanka Volgograd (1)	Istochnik Rostov-on-Don (1)
1994–95	Rotor Volgograd (2)	Rostselmash (2)	Istochnik Rostov-on-Don (2)
1995–96	Rotor Volgograd (3)	Istochnik Rostov-on-Don (1)	Rostselmash (1)
1996–97	Istochnik Rostov-on-Don (1)	Kuban Krasnodar (1)	Rostselmash (2)
1997–98	Istochnik Rostov-on-Don (2)	Kuban Krasnodar (2)	Akva Volgograd (3)
1998–99	Akva Volgograd (4)	Kuban Krasnodar (3)	AGU-Adyif Maykop (1)
1999–00	Akva Volgograd (5)	Kuban Krasnodar (3)	AGU-Adyif Maykop (2)
2000–01	Akva Volgograd (6)	Lada Togliatti (1)	Rostselmash (3)
2001–02	Lada Togliatti (1)	Akva Volgograd (1)	Rostselmash (4)
2002–03	Lada Togliatti (2)	Akva Volgograd (2)	Rostov-Don (5)
2003–04	Lada Togliatti (3)	Dinamo-Akva Volgograd (3)	Rostov-Don (6)
2004–05	Lada Togliatti (4)	Dinamo Volgograd (4)	Rostov-Don (7)
2005–06	Lada Togliatti (5)	Dinamo Volgograd (5)	Zvezda Zvenigorod (1)
2006–07	Zvezda Zvenigorod (1)	Lada Togliatti (2)	Dinamo Volgograd (1)
2007–08	Lada Togliatti (6)	Zvezda Zvenigorod (1)	Dinamo Volgograd (2)
2008–09	Dinamo Volgograd (7)	Zvezda Zvenigorod (2)	Lada Togliatti (1)
2009–10	Dinamo Volgograd (8)	Zvezda Zvenigorod (3)	Rostov-Don (8)
2010–11	Dinamo Volgograd (9)	Rostov-Don (3)	Lada Togliatti (2)
2011–12	Dinamo Volgograd (10)	Rostov-Don (4)	Lada Togliatti (3)
2012–13	Dinamo Volgograd (11)	Rostov-Don (5)	Zvezda Zvenigorod (2)
2013–14	Dinamo-Sinara Volgograd (12)	Lada Togliatti (3)	Rostov-Don (9)
2014–15	Rostov-Don (2)	Lada Togliatti (4)	Astrakhanochka (1)
2015–16	Astrakhanochka (1)	Rostov-Don (6)	Lada Togliatti (4)
2016–17	Rostov-Don (3)	Lada Togliatti (5)	Kuban Krasnodar (1)
2017–18	Rostov-Don (4)	Lada Togliatti (6)	Astrakhanochka (2)
2018–19	Rostov-Don (5)	Lada Togliatti (7)	Kuban Krasnodar (2)
2019–20	Rostov-Don (6)	Lada Togliatti (8)	CSKA Moscow (1)
2020–21	CSKA Moscow (1)	Rostov-Don (7)	Lada Togliatti (5)
2021–22	Rostov-Don (7)	CSKA Moscow (1)	Lada Togliatti (6)
2022–23	CSKA Moscow (2)	Rostov-Don (8)	Zvezda Zvenigorod (3)
2023–24	CSKA Moscow (3)	Rostov-Don (9)	Astrakhanochka (3)

== Statistics ==
=== EHF coefficients ===
The following data indicates Russian coefficient rankings between European handball leagues.

Country ranking

EHF League Ranking for 2022/23 season:

- 1. (1) (Hungary) Nemzeti Bajnokság I (157.67)
- 2. (5) (France) Ligue Butagaz Énergie (118.50)
- 3. (2) (Russia) Russian Superleague (114.50)
- 4. (3) (Denmark) Bambusa Kvindeligaen (109.00)
- 5. (6) (Norway) REMA 1000-ligaen (102.77)
- 6. (4) (Romania) Liga Națională (94.50)
