= HC Kuban Krasnodar =

- Full name: HC Kuban Krasnodar
- Founded: 1973
- Arena: Olymp Sports Palace, Krasnodar
- Capacity: 3,000
- President: Yevgeni Trefilov
- Head coach: Nikita Golub
- League: Russian Super League
- 2020–21: 6th
- Club colours
Home	Away

HC Kuban Krasnodar is a Russian women's handball team from Krasnodar competing in the Russian Super League.

Kuban enjoyed its golden era in the late 1980s, winning two Cup Winners' Cups in 1987 and 1988 by beating TSC Berlin and Vasas Budapest in the final, and reaching the 1990 European Cup's final, lost to Hypo Niederösterreich, after winning the 1989 Soviet Championship. Kuban also played a third unsuccessful Cup Winners' Cup final in 1989.

Following the collapse of the Soviet Union Kuban won the transitional CIS Championship, but it hasn't been able to win the new Russian Super League to date. Between 1997 and 2000 the team was second to Istochnik Rostov and Aqva Volgograd, its best results. In 2000 it also reached its fourth Cup Winners' Cup's final, losing to Mar Valencia.

In reaction to the 2022 Russian invasion of Ukraine, the International Handball Federation banned Russian athletes, and the European Handball Federation suspended the Russian clubs from competing in European handball competitions.

== Kits ==
HOME

2020-

AWAY

2020-

== Titles ==
- Cup Winners' Cup
  - 1987, 1988
- Soviet Championship
  - 1989, 1992

== European record ==
Season	Competition	Round	Club	1st leg	2nd leg	Aggregate
2016–17	EHF Cup	R1	(Greece) Nea Ionia	36–24	31–24	67–48
2016–17	EHF Cup	R2	(Switzerland) Spono Eagles	35–23	38–28	73–51
2016–17	EHF Cup	R3	(Austria) Hypo Niederösterreich	29–23	32–26	61–49
2016–17	EHF Cup	Group B	(Hungary) Alba Fehérvár	31–26	31–24	1st place
2016–17	EHF Cup	Group B	(France) Brest Bretagne	25–20	21–27	1st place
2016–17	EHF Cup	Group B	(Germany) Leipzig	32–24	34–21	1st place
2016–17	EHF Cup	1/4	(Germany) Bietigheim	26–33	31–26	57–59

== Team ==
=== 2021/2022 squad ===
Squad for the 2021–22 season.

Goalkeepers

- 16 (Russia) Veronika Chipula
- 78 (Azerbaijan) Mariya Molyavskaya

Wingers
LW

- 4 (Russia) Alexandra Davidenko
- 8 (Russia) Iana Savinova
- 94 (Russia) Sofia Panasovskaya

RW

- 5 (Russia) Valeriia Vaykum
- 7 (Russia) Diana Golub
- 24 (Russia) Anna Efimkova
- 33 (Russia) Milana Rzaeva

Line players

- 32 (Russia) Kristina Suchalkina
- 10 (Russia) Kseniia Trukhina
- 87 (Russia) Mariya Gafonova

Back players
LB

- 6 (Russia) Dalila Danilchenko
- 20 (Russia) Victoria Zhilinskayte
- 26 (Russia) Alina Sergienko
- 38 (Russia) Sofia Sinitskaya
- 40 (Russia) Anastasiya Shavman
- 66 (Russia) Ekaterina Drozdova

CB

- 18 (Russia) Sofiia Penzeva
- 50 (Russia) Sofia Porshina
- 71 (Russia) Ekaterina Levchina

RB

- 62 (Russia) Arina Sergienko
- 63 (Russia) Ekaterina Bobina
- 77 (Russia) Viktoriia Shershkova
- 93 (Russia) Anna Bogdasheva
