= List of handball clubs in France =

List of association handball clubs in France sorted by division

== LNH Division 1 (Liqui Moly StarLigue) – 2022–23 season teams – 16 clubs ==
Location of the 2022–23 LNH Division 1 teams

Team	City	Region	Rank 21–22
Pays d'Aix Université Club	Aix-en-Provence	Provence-Alpes-Côte d'Azur	3rd place, bronze medalist(s)
Cesson Rennes	Cesson-Sévigné	Brittany	9th
Chambéry	Chambéry	Auvergne-Rhône-Alpes	5th
Chartres Métropole	Chartres	Centre-Val de Loire	10th
US Créteil	Créteil	Île-de-France	11th
Dunkerque	Dunkerque	Hauts-de-France	12th
Istres Provence Handball	Istres	Provence-Alpes-Côte d'Azur	14th
US Ivry	Ivry-sur-Seine	Île-de-France	▲1st VAP (D2)
Limoges Handball	Limoges	Nouvelle-Aquitaine	13th
Montpellier HB	Montpellier	Occitania	4th
HBC Nantes	Nantes	Pays de la Loire	2nd place, silver medalist(s)
USAM Nîmes	Nîmes	Occitania	6th
Paris Saint-Germain	Paris	Île-de-France	1st place, gold medalist(s)
Saint Raphaël	Saint-Raphaël	Provence-Alpes-Côte d'Azur	8th
Sélestat Alsace Handball	Sélestat	Grand Est	▲2nd VAP (D2)
Fenix Toulouse	Toulouse	Occitania	7th

== LNH Division 2 (ProLigue) – 2022–23 season teams – 16 clubs ==
Location of the 2022–23 LNH Division 2 teams

Team	City	Region	Rank 21–22
Grand Besançon DHB	Besançon	Bourgogne-Franche-Comté	12th
Billère Handball	Billère	Occitania	9th
Bordeaux Bruges Lormont	Bruges	Nouvelle-Aquitaine	▲1st VAP (D3)
Caen Handball	Caen	Normandy	10th
JS Cherbourg	Cherbourg	Normandy	2nd
Dijon Métropole HB	Dijon	Bourgogne-Franche-Comté	6th
Frontignan Handball	Frontignan	Occitania	▲2nd VAP (D3)
Massy Essonne Handball	Massy	Île-de-France	8th
Nancy Handball	Nancy	Grand Est	16th (D1)
Pontault-Combault Handball	Pontault-Combault	Île-de-France	3rd
Saran Loiret Handball	Saran	Centre-Val de Loire	15th (D1)
Sarrebourg Moselle-Sud HB	Sarrebourg	Grand Est	11th
Strasbourg Eurométropole HB	Strasbourg	Grand Est	13th
Tremblay Handball	Tremblay-en-France	Île-de-France	7th
Valence Handball	Valence	Auvergne-Rhône-Alpes	15th
Villeurbanne HBA	Villeurbanne	Auvergne-Rhône-Alpes	14th

== LFH Division 1 Féminine (Ligue Butagaz Énergie) – 2022–23 season teams – 14 clubs ==
Location of the LFH Division 1 Féminine 2021–22 teams

Club	City	Region of France	Rank 2021–22
ESBF Besançon	Besançon	Bourgogne-Franche-Comté	4th
Bourg-de-Péage Drôme Handball	Bourg-de-Péage	Auvergne-Rhône-Alpes	9th
Brest Bretagne Handball	Brest	Brittany	2nd place, silver medalist(s)
Chambray Touraine Handball	Chambray-lès-Tours	Centre-Val de Loire	6th
HBC Celles-sur-Belle	Celles-sur-Belle	Nouvelle-Aquitaine	13th
JDA Dijon Bourgogne Handball	Dijon	Bourgogne-Franche-Comté	8th
Metz Handball	Metz	Grand Est	1st place, gold medalist(s)
Mérignac Handball	Mérignac	Nouvelle-Aquitaine	10th
Neptunes de Nantes	Nantes	Pays de la Loire	5th
OGC Nice	Nice	Provence-Alpes-Côte d'Azur	7th
Paris 92	Issy-les-Moulineaux	Île-de-France	3rd place, bronze medalist(s)
Handball Plan-de-Cuques	Plan-de-Cuques	Provence-Alpes-Côte d'Azur	12th
Saint-Amand Handball	Saint-Amand-les-Eaux	Hauts-de-France	1st VAP (Division 2)
Toulon Métropole Var Handball	Toulon	Provence-Alpes-Côte d'Azur	11th

== LFH Division 2 Féminine (D2F) – 2022–23 season teams – 14 clubs ==
Location of the LFH Division 2 Féminine 2021–22 teams

Club	City	Region of France	Rank 2021–22	VAP
Achenheim Truchtersheim Handball	Achenheim & Truchtersheim	Grand Est	8th	Yes
Sambre Avesnois Handball	Aulnoye-Aymeries	Hauts-de-France	3rd	Yes
Club Athlétique Béglais Handball	Bègles	Nouvelle-Aquitaine	9th	
Palente Besançon HB	Besançon	Bourgogne-Franche-Comté	1st in N1 Group 3	
Bouillargues Handball Nîmes Métropole	Bouillargues	Occitania	4th	Yes
HB Clermont Auvergne Métropole 63	Clermont-Ferrand	Auvergne-Rhône-Alpes	7th	Yes
~~Fleury Loiret Handball~~	~~Fleury-les-Aubrais~~	~~Centre-Val de Loire~~	~~14th (D1)~~	Yes
Le Havre AC Handball	Le Havre	Normandy	5th	Yes
Lomme Lille Métropole Handball	Lomme	Hauts-de-France	1st in N1 Group 2	
Noisy-le-Grand Handball	Noisy-le-Grand	Île-de-France	6th	Yes
Saint-Grégoire Rennes Métropole HB	Saint-Grégoire	Brittany	11th	
Stella Saint-Maur Handball	Saint-Maur-des-Fossés	Île-de-France	2nd	Yes
Toulouse Féminin Handball	Toulouse	Occitania	1st in N1 Group 4	
ASUL Vaulx-en-Velin	Vaulx-en-Velin	Auvergne-Rhône-Alpes	10th	

== Club by region (2022/2023) ==
Elite leagues only

Rank	Region of France	Club	Note
1	Provence-Alpes-Côte d'Azur (6)	Pays d'Aix UC	: 3/6 : 3/6
1	Provence-Alpes-Côte d'Azur (6)	Istres Provence Handball	: 3/6 : 3/6
1	Provence-Alpes-Côte d'Azur (6)	OGC Nice	: 3/6 : 3/6
1	Provence-Alpes-Côte d'Azur (6)	Handball Plan-de-Cuques	: 3/6 : 3/6
1	Provence-Alpes-Côte d'Azur (6)	Saint-Raphaël VHB	: 3/6 : 3/6
1	Provence-Alpes-Côte d'Azur (6)	Toulon Var Métropole HB	: 3/6 : 3/6
2	Île-de-France (4)	US Créteil	: 3/4 : 1/4
2	Île-de-France (4)	Paris 92	: 3/4 : 1/4
2	Île-de-France (4)	US Ivry	: 3/4 : 1/4
2	Île-de-France (4)	Paris Saint-Germain HB	: 3/4 : 1/4
3	Nouvelle-Aquitaine (3)	HBC Celles-sur-Belle	: 1/3 : 2/3
3	Nouvelle-Aquitaine (3)	Limoges Handball	: 1/3 : 2/3
3	Nouvelle-Aquitaine (3)	Mérignac Handball	: 1/3 : 2/3
3	Occitanie (Occitania) (3)	Montpellier HB	: 3/3 : 0
3	Occitanie (Occitania) (3)	USAM Nîmes	: 3/3 : 0
3	Occitanie (Occitania) (3)	Fenix Toulouse	: 3/3 : 0
5	Auvergne-Rhône-Alpes (2)	Bourg-de-Péage DHB	: 1/2 : 1/2
5	Auvergne-Rhône-Alpes (2)	Chambéry	: 1/2 : 1/2
5	Bretagne (Brittany) (2)	Brest Bretagne Handball	: 1/2 : 1/2
5	Bretagne (Brittany) (2)	Cesson Rennes	: 1/2 : 1/2
5	Bourgogne-Franche-Comté (2)	ESBF Besançon	: 0 : 2/2
5	Bourgogne-Franche-Comté (2)	JDA Dijon Bourgogne HB	: 0 : 2/2
5	Centre-Val de Loire (2)	Chambray Touraine HB	: 1/2 : 1/2
5	Centre-Val de Loire (2)	Chartres Métropole	: 1/2 : 1/2
5	Grand Est (2)	Metz Handball	: 1/2 : 1/2
5	Grand Est (2)	Sélestat Alsace Handball	: 1/2 : 1/2
5	Hauts-de-France (2)	Dunkerque	: 1/2 : 1/2
5	Hauts-de-France (2)	Saint-Amand Handball	: 1/2 : 1/2
5	Pays de la Loire (2)	HBC Nantes	: 1/2 : 1/2
5	Pays de la Loire (2)	Neptunes de Nantes	: 1/2 : 1/2

Notes:

- Division 1 clubs only
  - No clubs from Corsica and Normandy in the French handball's elite
  - Provence-Alpes-Côte d'Azur has the most elite clubs (6 clubs)
  - No women's clubs in the elite from Occitania
  - No men's clubs in the elite from Bourgogne-Franche-Comté
  - Nantes has 2 elite clubs: HBC Nantes and Neptunes de Nantes
- Division 1 and Division 2 clubs:
  - Île-de-France has the most high-level clubs (9 clubs in D1 & D2)
  - Bourgogne-Franche-Comté clubs are Besançon or Dijon-based
  - Dijon has 2 high-level clubs: JDA Dijon and Dijon MH
  - Besançon has 3 high-level clubs: ESBF, Palente and GBDH
  - Toulouse has 2 high-level clubs: Fenix Toulouse and TFH
- Clubs part of a multi-sports club
  - Paris Saint-Germain HB → Paris Saint-Germain F.C.
  - JDA Dijon Handball → JDA Dijon Basket
  - Neptunes de Nantes with Neptunes de Nantes Volley

Both premier and second level leagues (Division 1 & 2)

Rank	Region of France	Division	Club
1	Île-de-France (9): D1: 4; D2: 5	D1	US Créteil
1	Île-de-France (9): D1: 4; D2: 5	D1	Paris 92
1	Île-de-France (9): D1: 4; D2: 5	D1	US Ivry
1	Île-de-France (9): D1: 4; D2: 5	D1	Paris Saint-Germain
1	Île-de-France (9): D1: 4; D2: 5	D2	Massy Essonne HB
1	Île-de-France (9): D1: 4; D2: 5	D2	Noisy-le-Grand HB
1	Île-de-France (9): D1: 4; D2: 5	D2	Pontault-Combault HB
1	Île-de-France (9): D1: 4; D2: 5	D2	Stella Saint-Maur HB
1	Île-de-France (9): D1: 4; D2: 5	D2	Tremblay HB
2	Occitanie (7): D1: 3; D2: 4	D1	Montpellier HB
2	Occitanie (7): D1: 3; D2: 4	D1	USAM Nîmes
2	Occitanie (7): D1: 3; D2: 4	D1	Fenix Toulouse
2	Occitanie (7): D1: 3; D2: 4	D2	Billère HB
2	Occitanie (7): D1: 3; D2: 4	D2	Bouillargues HNM
2	Occitanie (7): D1: 3; D2: 4	D2	Frontignan HB
2	Occitanie (7): D1: 3; D2: 4	D2	Toulouse FH
3	Auvergne-Rhône-Alpes (6): D1: 2; D2: 4	D1	Bourg-de-Péage DHB
3	Auvergne-Rhône-Alpes (6): D1: 2; D2: 4	D1	Chambéry
3	Auvergne-Rhône-Alpes (6): D1: 2; D2: 4	D2	HB Clermont AM63
3	Auvergne-Rhône-Alpes (6): D1: 2; D2: 4	D2	Valence HB
3	Auvergne-Rhône-Alpes (6): D1: 2; D2: 4	D2	ASUL Vaulx-en-Velin
3	Auvergne-Rhône-Alpes (6): D1: 2; D2: 4	D2	Villeurbanne HBA
3	Grand Est (6): D1: 2; D2: 4	D1	Metz HB
3	Grand Est (6): D1: 2; D2: 4	D1	Sélestat AHB
3	Grand Est (6): D1: 2; D2: 4	D2	Achenheim Truchtersheim HB
3	Grand Est (6): D1: 2; D2: 4	D2	Nancy HB
3	Grand Est (6): D1: 2; D2: 4	D2	Sarrebourg MSHB
3	Grand Est (6): D1: 2; D2: 4	D2	Strasbourg EH
3	Provence-Alpes-Côte d'Azur (6): D1: 6/6	D1	Pays d'Aix UC
3	Provence-Alpes-Côte d'Azur (6): D1: 6/6	D1	Istres Provence HB
3	Provence-Alpes-Côte d'Azur (6): D1: 6/6	D1	OGC Nice
3	Provence-Alpes-Côte d'Azur (6): D1: 6/6	D1	HB Plan-de-Cuques
3	Provence-Alpes-Côte d'Azur (6): D1: 6/6	D1	Saint Raphaël VHB
3	Provence-Alpes-Côte d'Azur (6): D1: 6/6	D1	Toulon MV
6	Bourgogne-Franche-Comté (5): D1: 2; D2: 3	D1	ESBF Besançon
6	Bourgogne-Franche-Comté (5): D1: 2; D2: 3	D1	JDA Dijon Bourgogne HB
6	Bourgogne-Franche-Comté (5): D1: 2; D2: 3	D2	Grand Besançon DHB
6	Bourgogne-Franche-Comté (5): D1: 2; D2: 3	D2	Palente Besançon HB
6	Bourgogne-Franche-Comté (5): D1: 2; D2: 3	D2	Dijon MH
6	Nouvelle-Aquitaine (5): D1: 3; D2: 2	D1	HBC Celles-sur-Belle
6	Nouvelle-Aquitaine (5): D1: 3; D2: 2	D1	Limoges HB
6	Nouvelle-Aquitaine (5): D1: 3; D2: 2	D1	Mérignac HB
6	Nouvelle-Aquitaine (5): D1: 3; D2: 2	D2	Club Athlétique Béglais HB
6	Nouvelle-Aquitaine (5): D1: 3; D2: 2	D2	Bordeaux Bruges Lormont
8	Hauts-de-France (4): D1: 2; D2: 2	D1	Dunkerque
8	Hauts-de-France (4): D1: 2; D2: 2	D1	Saint-Amand HB
8	Hauts-de-France (4): D1: 2; D2: 2	D2	Lomme Lille MH
8	Hauts-de-France (4): D1: 2; D2: 2	D2	Sambre Avesnois HB
8	Centre-Val de Loire (4): D1: 2; D2: 2	D1	Chambray Touraine HB
8	Centre-Val de Loire (4): D1: 2; D2: 2	D1	Chartres Métropole
8	Centre-Val de Loire (4): D1: 2; D2: 2	D2	Fleury Loiret Handball
8	Centre-Val de Loire (4): D1: 2; D2: 2	D2	Saran Loiret Handball
10	Bretagne (3): D1: 2; D2: 1	D1	Brest BH
10	Bretagne (3): D1: 2; D2: 1	D1	Cesson Rennes
10	Bretagne (3): D1: 2; D2: 1	D2	Saint-Grégoire Rennes MHB
10	Normandie (3): D1: 0; D2: 3/3	D2	Caen HB
10	Normandie (3): D1: 0; D2: 3/3	D2	JS Cherbourg
10	Normandie (3): D1: 0; D2: 3/3	D2	Le Havre AC HB
11	Pays de la Loire (2): D1: 2/2	D1	HBC Nantes
11	Pays de la Loire (2): D1: 2/2	D1	Neptunes de Nantes

== Domestic competitions ==
- Men
  - LNH Division 1 (Liqui Moly StarLigue)
  - LNH Division 2 (ProLigue)
  - Coupe de France
  - Coupe de la Ligue
  - Trophée des Champions
- Women
  - LFH Division 1 Féminine
  - LFH Division 2 Féminine
  - Coupe de France
