= 2026–27 LNH Division 1 =

LNH Division 1
- Season: 2026–27
- Dates: 5 September 2026 – 6 June 2027
- Matches: 72
- Goals: 4,462 (61.97 per match)
- Top goalscorer: Elio Zammit (66 goals)

The 2026–27 LNH Division 1, also known as Daikin Starligue for sponsorship reasons, is the 75th season of the LNH Division 1, France's premier handball league. The season began on 4 September 2026 and will conclude on 5 June 2027.

== Teams ==
2026–27 Starligue teams

=== Team changes ===
Promoted from 2025–26 LNH Division 2	Relegated from 2025–26 LNH Division 1
Saran Loiret Handball; Caen Handball	Istres Provence Handball; Dijon Métropole Handball

=== Stadiums ===
Team	City	Venue	Capacity
C' Chartres MHB	Chartres	Halle Jean-Cochet	1,200
Caen Handball	Caen	Palais des sports de Caen	4,200
Cesson Rennes MHB	Cesson-Sévigné	Glaz Arena	4,500
Chambéry SMB HB	Chambéry	Le Phare	4,500
Dunkerque HGL	Dunkerque	Stade des Flandres	2,400
Fenix Toulouse	Toulouse	Palais des Sports André-Brouat	4,397
HBC Nantes	Nantes	H Arena	5,500
Limoges Handball	Limoges	Palais des Sports de Beaublanc	5,516
Montpellier Handball	Montpellier	FDI Stadium	3,000
Paris Saint-Germain	Paris	Stade Pierre de Coubertin	3,400
Pays d'Aix UC	Aix-en-Provence	Arena du Pays d'Aix	6,004
Saint-Raphaël VHB	Saint-Raphaël	Palais des sports J-F Krakowski	2,500
Saran Loiret Handball	Saran	Palais des sports d'Orléans	3,222
Sélestat Alsace Handball	Sélestat	Centre Sportif Intercommunal	2,300
Tremblay Handball	Tremblay-en-France	Palais des Sports	1,020
USAM Nîmes	Nîmes	Le Parnasse	4,191

== League table ==
Pos	Team	Pld	W	D	L	GF	GA	GD	Pts	Qualification or relegation
1	Paris Saint-Germain	9	9	0	0	314	241	+73	18	Qualification for the Champions League
2	HBC Nantes	9	8	0	1	331	269	+62	16	Qualification for the European League
3	USAM Nîmes	9	7	0	2	295	288	+7	14	Qualification for the European League
4	Montpellier Handball	9	5	2	2	288	263	+25	12	Qualification for the European League
5	Tremblay Handball	9	5	1	3	300	286	+14	11	Qualification for the European League
6	Limoges Handball	9	5	0	4	296	269	+27	10	
7	Pays d'Aix UC	9	5	0	4	295	273	+22	10	
8	Caen Handball	9	5	0	4	256	285	−29	10	
9	Fenix Toulouse	9	4	0	5	255	263	−8	8	
10	C' Chartres MHB	9	3	1	5	262	289	−27	7	
11	Saran Loiret Handball	9	3	0	6	257	282	−25	6	
12	Sélestat Alsace Handball	9	3	0	6	260	277	−17	6	
13	Saint-Raphaël VHB	9	3	0	6	269	300	−31	6	
14	Chambéry SMB HB	9	2	2	5	286	306	−20	6	
15	Cesson Rennes MHB	9	1	0	8	275	307	−32	2	Relegation to LNH Division 2
16	Dunkerque HGL	9	1	0	8	223	264	−41	2	Relegation to LNH Division 2

Updated to match(es) played on 1 November 2026. Source: LNH
Rules for classification: 1) points; 2) head-to-head points; 3) head-to-head goal difference; 4) head-to-head number of goals scored; 5) goal difference; 6) goals scored.

== Results ==
Home \ Away	CCH	CAE	CES	CHA	DUN	TOU	NAN	LIM	MON	PSG	AIX	STR	SAR	SEL	TRE	NIM
C' Chartres MHB	—		31–28	35–35											35–30	32–33
Caen Handball	32–26	—			26–24			23–38		28–42		33–30				
Cesson Rennes MHB			—				37–46	29–31			29–28			33–36		32–34
Chambéry SMB HB				—						29–32	34–33	33–34			31–44	
Dunkerque HGL	25–27			29–38	—		24–31				24–36					
Fenix Toulouse	30–28	31–32				—		31–30				35–31		24–25		
HBC Nantes		38–31		41–29		29–30	—				38–28					
Limoges Handball					32–24			—		33–35		36–31	28–30			35–31
Montpellier Handball	41–22			25–25			31–36	35–33	—				31–25			
Paris Saint-Germain	35–26		30–24			29–23			33–23	—						
Pays d'Aix UC		32–25				32–26					—		39–30	34–32		
Saint-Raphaël VHB			37–34		26–25					28–42		—	22–26			
Saran Loiret Handball						27–25	31–34			27–36			—		30–35	31–32
Sélestat Alsace Handball		24–26		33–32	21–23				30–38					—		
Tremblay Handball			34–29				28–38		26–26			36–30		33–31	—	
USAM Nîmes					27–25				33–38		35–33			34–28	36–34	—

Updated to match(es) played on 1 November 2026. Source: LNH
Legend: Blue = home team win; Yellow = draw; Red = away team win.

== Top goalscorers ==
Rank	Player	Club	Goals
1	(France) Elio Zammit	Chambéry SMB HB	66
2	(Switzerland) Noam Leopold	HBC Nantes	65
3	(France) Théo Avelange-Demouge	Tremblay Handball	63
4	(France) Alex Moran	Cesson Rennes MHB	57
5	(Portugal) Diogo Oliveira	Dunkerque HGL	56
6	(France) Gueric Vincent	USAM Nîmes	54
7	(France) Lucas Vanègue	Chambéry SMB HB	50
8	(France) Jean-Loup Faustin	USAM Nîmes	47
9	(France) Thibaud Briet	HBC Nantes	46
10	(France) Antoine Tissot	Pays d'Aix UC	45
10	(France) Gabriel Loesch	Pays d'Aix UC	45
10	(France) Antonin Mohamed	Saint-Raphaël VHB	45
