= LFH Division 2 Féminine =

French handball competition

- Current season, competition or edition: 2025-26
- Sport: Handball
- Founded: 1971
- Organising body: Ligue Féminine de Handball (LFH)
- No. of teams: 14
- Country: France
- Most recent champion: Le Havre (2024–25)
- Most titles: Mérignac Handball (5)
- Streaming partner: Handball TV
- Level on pyramid: 2
- Promotion to: Division 1
- Relegation to: Nationale 1 Féminine (N1F)
- Domestic cup: Coupe de France
- Website: ligue-feminine-handball.fr ffhandball.fr

The Division 2 Féminine (D2F) is a handball league, and the second level of the French women's handball pyramid. It is organized by the Ligue Féminine de Handball (LFH), under delegation from the French Handball Federation (FFHB).

Founded in 1971, it is currently contested by 14 teams. The league has both professional and amateur players.

== History ==
Founded in 1971, it was directly administered by the FFHB until the end of the 2021/2022 season when the D2F was absorbed by the LFH – the LFH was already managing the elite women's league (Division 1).

Location of the LFH Division 2 Féminine 2022–23 teams

== Participating teams ==
=== 2022–23 season teams ===
Club	City	Region of France	Rank 2021–22	VAP
Achenheim Truchtersheim Handball	Achenheim & Truchtersheim	Grand Est	8th	Yes
Sambre Avesnois Handball	Aulnoye-Aymeries	Hauts-de-France	3rd	Yes
Club Athlétique Béglais Handball	Bègles	Nouvelle-Aquitaine	9th	
Palente Besançon HB	Besançon	Bourgogne-Franche-Comté	1st in N1 Group 3	
Bouillargues Handball Nîmes Métropole	Bouillargues	Occitania	4th	Yes
HB Clermont Auvergne Métropole 63	Clermont-Ferrand	Auvergne-Rhône-Alpes	7th	Yes
Fleury Loiret Handball	Fleury-les-Aubrais	Centre-Val de Loire	14th (D1)	Yes
Le Havre AC Handball	Le Havre	Normandy	5th	Yes
Lomme Lille Métropole Handball	Lomme	Hauts-de-France	1st in N1 Group 2	
Noisy-le-Grand Handball	Noisy-le-Grand	Île-de-France	6th	Yes
Saint-Grégoire Rennes Métropole HB	Saint-Grégoire	Brittany	11th	
Stella Saint-Maur Handball	Saint-Maur-des-Fossés	Île-de-France	2nd	Yes
Toulouse Féminin Handball	Toulouse	Occitania	1st in N1 Group 4	
ASUL Vaulx-en-Velin	Vaulx-en-Velin	Auvergne-Rhône-Alpes	10th	

==== Personnel and kits ====
Club	Abbr	Manager	Captain	Kit manufacturer
Achenheim Truchtersheim HB	ATH	(Czech Republic) Jan Bašný	(France) Dalila Abdesselam	(Germany) Erima
Sambre Avesnois HB	SAHB	(France) Clément Petit	(France) Adeline Bournez	(France) Diffusport / DSX
Club Athlétique Béglais HB	CAB	(France) Julien Vasseur:	(France) Lalie Séailles	(Denmark) Hummel
Palente Besançon HB	PBHB	(France) Cheikh Seck	(France) Laurane Scalabrino	(Germany) Kempa
Bouillargues HB Nîmes Métropole	BHNM	(France) Delphine Cendré	(France) Chloé Roelandt / Axelle Bertrand	(France) Majestee
HB Clermont Auvergne Métropole 63	HBCAM63	(France) Florence Sauval	(Portugal) Jéssica Ferreira	(Germany) Kempa
Fleury Loiret Handball		(France) Christophe Cassan	(France) Suzanne Wajoka	(Italy) Kappa
Le Havre AC Handball	HAC	(France) Stéphane Pellan	(Serbia) Marina Pantić	(Germany) Erima
Lomme Lille Métropole HB	LLMH	(France) Laurent Worm	(France) Célia Benlabed	(France) Atorka
Noisy-le-Grand Handball	NLG HB93	(France) Farid Gherram	(France) (Democratic Republic of the Congo) Isaure Mosabau	(France) Nolt
Saint-Grégoire Rennes Métropole HB	SGRMHB	(France) Olivier Mantes	(France) Charlotte Satgé	(Sweden) Craft
Stella Saint-Maur Handball	Stella St-Maur	(France) Rémi Samson	(France) Djénéba Tandjan	(Germany) Puma
Toulouse Féminin HB	TFH	(France) Ludovic Seutchie	(France) Julie Legatindji	(Sweden) Craft
ASUL Vaulx-en-Velin	ASUL VV	(France) Sébastien Modenel	(France) Lola Berrais	(Japan) Mizuno

== Competition format ==
All 14 teams play each other twice during the regular season (home and away matches). At the end of the regular season, the best placed team that possesses the VAP status is promoted to the top-tier level Division 1 Féminine (Ligue Butagaz Energie), and is replaced by the relegated bottom team from D1F.

The bottom three placed teams from each season of the D2F are relegated to the third tier level of handball, Nationale 1 Féminine (N1F). 3 qualified teams from N1F take their places.

Teams receive three points for a win, two points for a draw and one point for a loss.

== VAP status ==
Clubs who want to access to the D1F in the relatively short term have to apply for and earn the VAP status (statut VAP).

The VAP status (Voie d'accession au professionnalisme, accession path to professionalism) is given annually to Division 2 clubs which have made the necessary steps (financial and administrative) to facilitate their professionalization and promotion to the top league.

They have to fulfil set specifications, including:

- 4 full-time professional players within the team, 3 full-time equivalent players
- 1 full-time professional coach with the required diplomas
- 1 or several administrative personnel (1 full-time equivalent (FTE) minimum)
- 1 reserve team (who are able to play at a Nationale 1 Féminine level maximum, not in D2F) or a U17 team playing in a French league
- provisional budget of €600,000 (excluding the valuation of voluntary work, and handball court-related arrangements/equipment that were placed gracefully at the disposal of the club)
- positive capital stock (except in the case of a debt clearance plan approved by the LFH finance control body)
- a court that fulfills set minimal standards
- presence of a doctor and a kinesitherapist at home games, a kinesitherapist (or a doctor) at away games
- access to high-speed Internet in the arena / gymnasium / sport facility

Clubs aren't obligated to have the VAP status to play in the D2F but they can't be promoted to the upper echelon without it. Those VAP status measures are in place since the 2012/2013 season and aim to prepare the clubs and support their viability in the professional sport world.

== List of winners ==
List of winners of the Division 2
Season	Champion	Second	Third	Promoted team(s) to Division 1
Championnat de France excellence / Nationale 2
1971-1972	ASPTT Strasbourg	Stade Marseillais UC		? : Strasbourg, SMUC, ...
1972-1973	Troyes OS	HBC Seclin		? : Troyes, ...
1973-1974	ASEA Toulouse	Stade de Vanves		? : Toulouse, Vanves, Vendôme, SMUC
1974-1975	CN Mourenx	CO Arles		? : Mourenx, Arles
1975-1976	Stade de Vanves	Racing Club de France		? :
1976-1977	Stade français	AS Mantes		?
1977-1978	Dreux AC	SC Angoulême		? :
1978-1979	SLUC Nancy	US Dunkerque	AS Brest, ASPTT Nice	4 : Nancy, Dunkerque, AS Brest & Nice
1979-1980	CEP Saint-Nicolas-d'Aliermont	US Cagnes	UJLRS Le Mans	4 : St-Nicolas, Cagnes, Le Mans, Bar-le-Duc
1980-1981	ASPTT Nice	ASPTT Paris	?	5 : Nice, Paris, Mantes, Chemaudin, Villersexel
1981-1982	SLUC Nancy (2)	SA Mérignac	USM Gagny, Stella Saint-Maur	4 : Nancy, Mérignac, Gagny & Saint-Maur
1982-1983	Stade français (2)	ASPTT Paris	Montpellier UC & UJLRS Le Mans	5 : Stade fr., Paris, Montpel., Aix-en-S., Poitiers
1983-1984	US Ivry	La Gauloise	Saint-Louis	none, N1 league went from 18 to 10 clubs
Nationale 1B
1984-1985	Racing Club de France	ES Colombes	ASPTT Metz	2 : Racing CF & Colombes
1985-1986	Metz-Marly	CMS Marignane	ASPTT Paris	3 : Metz, Marignane, Paris
1986-1987	Cercle Sportif Laïc Dijonnais	US Créteil		? : Dijon, Créteil
1987-1988	AC Boulogne-Billancourt	HBC Aix-en-Savoie	ASPTT Strasbourg	3 : ACBB, Aix, Strasbourg
1988-1989	Dreux AC (2)	CMS Marignane	Vallauris HBC	3 : Dreux, Marignane, Vallauris
1989-1990	ASPTT Strasbourg (2)	Joint final group with 6 clubs of N1A		2 : Bouillargues, Pontault-Combault
1990-1991	Marignane Handball	Joint final group with 6 clubs of N1A		2 : Bègles/ASPOM, Béthune
1991-1992	Décines HBC	SA Mérignac (2)		2 : Décines HBC, Mérignac
Nationale 1
1992-1993	ES Colombes	FSE Achenheim	US Mios	2 : Colombes, Achenheim
1993-1994	US Mios	UODL Tassin-la-Demi-Lune		none (defeats in playdowns)
Division 2 (organized by the FFHB)
1994-1995	US Mios (2)	HBC Nîmes	?	2 : Mios-Biganos & Nîmes
1995-1996	SA Mérignac	AS Bondy	?	2 : Mérignac & Bondy
1996-1997	HBC Nîmes	HBC Kingersheim	Handball club conchois	2 : Nîmes, Kingersheim
1997-1998	AS Bondy	Cercle Dijon Bourgogne	Toulon Var Handball	2 : Bondy, Dijon
1998-1999	SA Mérignac (2)	Toulon Var Handball	Toulouse Féminin Handball	3 : Mérignac, Toulon, Toulouse
1999-2000	ASUL Vaulx-en-Velin	A.L. Bouillargues	CJF Fleury-les-Aubray	3 : Vaulx-en-Velin, Bouillargues & Fleury
2000-2001	Issy-les-Moulineaux HBF	US Alfortville	Le Havre AC Handball	2 : Issy & Alfortville
2001-2002	Le Havre AC Handball	SC Angoulême	ESC Yutz	2 : Le Havre & Angoulême
2002-2003	CJF Fleury-les-Aubrais	US Mios-Biganos	US Alfortville	2 : Fleury & Mios-Biganos
2003-2004	Aunis La Rochelle-Périgny	ESC Yutz	US Alfortville	2 : La Rochelle & Yutz
2004-2005	HOC Saint-Cyr-sur-Mer	CA Béglais	ASUL Vaulx-en-Velin	2 : Saint-Cyr & Bègles
2005-2006	Handball Plan-de-Cuques	Issy-les-Moulineaux	Aunis La Rochelle-Périgny	2 : Plan-de-Cuques & Issy
2006-2007	SC Angoulême	CS Vesoul Haute-Saône	Aunis La Rochelle-Périgny	2 : Angoulême & Vesoul
2007-2008	Arvor 29	Toulon Saint-Cyr Var Handball	ESC Yutz	2 : Arvor & Toulon
2008-2009	Mérignac Handball (3)	Toulouse Féminin Handball	ESC Yutz	1 : Toulouse
2009-2010	Issy Paris Hand (2)	Cergy-Pontoise HB	ES Besançon	3 : Issy, Cergy & Besançon
2010-2011	Noisy-le-Grand handball	CA Béglais	HB Octeville-sur-Mer	None
2011-2012	OGC Nice Côte d'Azur (2)	Cergy-Pontoise HB	Chambray Touraine Handball	1 : Nice
2012-2013	Nantes Loire Atlantique HB	Mérignac Handball	Cergy-Pontoise HB	1 : Nantes
2013-2014	Cercle Dijon Bourgogne (2)	Noisy-le-Grand handball	Yutz handball féminin	1 : Dijon
2014-2015	ES Besançon	Brest Bretagne Handball	AS Cannes HB	1 : Besançon
2015-2016	Brest Bretagne Handball (2)	Chambray Touraine Handball	Drôme Handball Bourg-de-Péage	3 : Brest, Chambray & HBC Celles/Belle
2016-2017	Bourg-de-Péage Drôme Handball	Entente Noisy/Gagny	Le Havre AC Handball	2 : Bourg-de-Péage & Le Havre
2017-2018	Mérignac Handball (4)	Handball Plan-de-Cuques	HBC St-Amand Porte du Hainaut	1 : HBC St-Amand Porte du Hainaut
2018-2019	Mérignac Handball (5)	HBC Celles-sur-Belle	Handball Plan-de-Cuques	1 : Mérignac Handball
2019-2020	League was cancelled due to the COVID-19 pandemic.			2 : Plan-de-Cuques & St-Amand
2020-2021	HBC Celles-sur-Belle	Le Havre AC Handball	-	1 : HBC Celles-sur-Belle
2021-2022	Saint-Amand Handball	Stella Saint-Maur Handball	Sambre Avesnois Handball	1 : Saint-Amand Handball
Division 2 / D2F (organized by the Ligue Féminine de Handball)
2022-2023	Stella Saint-Maur Handball	Achenheim Truchtersheim	Noisy-le-Grand handball	2 : Stella Saint-Maur Handball & Strasbourg Achenheim
2023-2024	Sambre Avesnois Handball	Stade pessacais UC	HBC Celles-sur-Belle	1 : Sambre Avesnois Handball
2024-2025	Le Havre	Neptunes de Nantes	HB Clermont AM 63	1 : Le Havre

== See also ==
- Coupe de France
- LFH Division 1 Féminine (Ligue Butagaz Énergie), the upper echelon of French women's handball
- LNH Division 1 (Liqui Moly Starligue), men's elite league
- LNH Division 2 (ProLigue), the corresponding men's competition
- List of handball clubs in France
- Women's sports
