= LFH Division 1 Féminine =

French handball competition

- Current season, competition or edition: 2026–27 LFH Division 1 Féminine
- Sport: Handball
- Founded: 1951; 75 years ago
- No. of teams: 14
- Country: France
- Confederation: EHF
- Most recent champion: Brest Bretagne Handball (3rd title) (2025-26)
- Most titles: Metz Handball (27 titles)
- Broadcasters: Moselle TV (Metz); Tébéo (Brest)
- Streaming partner: Handball TV
- Relegation to: Division 2 (D2F)
- Domestic cup: Coupe de France
- International cups: Champions League; EHF European League
- Website: ligue-feminine-handball.fr

LFH Division 1 Féminine, known for sponsorship reasons as Ligue Butagaz Énergie, is the premier women's handball league in France. It is overseen by the Ligue Féminine de Handball (LFH), the governing body of French women's professional handball, under delegation from the French Handball Federation (FFHB). Founded in 1952, it is currently contested by twelve teams.

Metz Handball has dominated the championship in recent times with 27 titles between 1989 and 2025 including a 6-year winning streak, while US Ivry and Paris UC were the most successful teams in past decades with nine and five titles respectively.

As of 2026:

- Metz Handball won the 2025–26 Women's EHF Champions League, as the first French team in history.
- The EHF European League has been won by only one french club: Neptunes de Nantes in 2021.

== Participating teams ==
=== 2025–26 teams ===
Location of the LFH Division 1 Féminine 2025–26 teams

Club	City	Region of France	Rank 2024-25
ESBF Besançon	Besançon	Bourgogne-Franche-Comté	5th
Brest Bretagne Handball	Brest	Brittany	2nd place, silver medalist(s)
Chambray Touraine Handball	Chambray-lès-Tours	Centre-Val de Loire	4th
JDA Dijon Bourgogne Handball	Dijon	Bourgogne-Franche-Comté	3rd place, bronze medalist(s)
Metz Handball	Metz	Grand Est	1st place, gold medalist(s)
Sambre Avesnois Handball	Maubeuge	Nord	14th
Le Havre	Le Havre	Seine-Maritime	1st VAP (Division 2)
OGC Nice	Nice	Provence-Alpes-Côte d'Azur	6th
Paris 92	Issy-les-Moulineaux	Île-de-France	19th
Handball Plan-de-Cuques	Plan-de-Cuques	Provence-Alpes-Côte d'Azur	7th
Saint-Amand Handball	Saint-Amand-les-Eaux	Hauts-de-France	12th
Stella Saint-Maur Handball	Saint-Maur-des-Fossés	Île-de-France	13th
SATH (Strasbourg Achenheim Truchtersheim Handball)	Achenheim, Truchtersheim	Grand Est	8th
Toulon Var Métropole Handball	Toulon	Provence-Alpes-Côte d'Azur	11th

=== Personnel and kits ===
Club	Manager	Captain	Kit manufacturer
ESBF Besançon	(France) Jérôme Delarue	(France) Pauline Robert	(France) Le Coq Sportif
Brest Bretagne	(France) Raphaëlle Tervel	(Sweden) Jenny Carlson	(Sweden) Craft
Chambray Touraine	(France) Mathieu Lanfranchi		(Italy) Kappa
JDA Dijon	(France) Clément Alcacer	(France) Sarah Valero Jodar	(Italy) Erreà
Metz HB	(France) Emmanuel Mayonnade	(France) Chloé Valentini	(Germany) Kempa
Sambre Aveinois	(France) Julien Vasseur		(Germany) Kempa
Le Havre AC	(France) Tom Garnier		(Italy) Erreà
OGC Nice	(France) Sébastien Mizoule	(Egypt) Ehsan Abdelmalek	(Denmark) Hummel
Paris 92	(France) Yacine Messaoudi	(France) Méline Nocandy	(France) Le Coq Sportif
Plan-de-Cuques	(France) Angélique Spincer	(France) Aurélie Goubel	(Germany) Puma
Saint-Amand HB	(Hungary) Edina Borsos Szabó	(France) Romane Frécon-Demouge	(Germany) Kempa
Stella Saint-Maur	(France) Rémi Sanson	(France) Pauline Plotton	(Germany) Puma
SATH	(Czech Republic) Jan Bašný	(France) Dalila Abdesselam	(Germany) Erima
Toulon	(France) Joël da Silva	(France) Manon Loquay	(Denmark) Hummel

Notes :

- Bourg-de-Péage Drôme Handball got dissolved in the middle of the 2022-23 season (financial insolvency).
- HBC Celles-sur-Belle ranked 10th at the end of 2022-23 and thus earned the sports right to keep playing in Division 1. However FFHandball's financial audit board relegated the club to Division 2 administratively.
  - Mérignac Handball, which ranked last (13th) and was relegated to Division 2, applied to take HBC Celles-sur-Belle's place in Division 1. Despite also suffering from financial problems, their appeal to be saved from relegation was accepted late by the federation, on Day 3 of the season.

Squads of previous seasons

2022-23 Teams

Club	City	Region of France	Rank 2021-22
ESBF Besançon	Besançon	Bourgogne-Franche-Comté	4th
Brest Bretagne Handball	Brest	Brittany	2nd place, silver medalist(s)
HBC Celles-sur-Belle	Celles-sur-Belle	Nouvelle-Aquitaine	13th
Chambray Touraine Handball	Chambray-lès-Tours	Centre-Val de Loire	6th
JDA Dijon Bourgogne Handball	Dijon	Bourgogne-Franche-Comté	8th
Metz Handball	Metz	Grand Est	1st place, gold medalist(s)
Mérignac Handball	Mérignac	Nouvelle-Aquitaine	10th
Neptunes de Nantes	Nantes	Pays de la Loire	5th
OGC Nice	Nice	Provence-Alpes-Côte d'Azur	7th
Paris 92	Issy-les-Moulineaux	Île-de-France	3rd place, bronze medalist(s)
Handball Plan-de-Cuques	Plan-de-Cuques	Provence-Alpes-Côte d'Azur	12th
Saint-Amand Handball	Saint-Amand-les-Eaux	Hauts-de-France	1st VAP (Division 2)
Toulon Var Métropole Handball	Toulon	Provence-Alpes-Côte d'Azur	11th
~~Bourg-de-Péage DHB~~ (dissolved)	Bourg-de-Péage	Auvergne-Rhône-Alpes	9th

== Competition format ==
All 14 teams play each other twice during the season (home and away matches – 26 competition days). At the end of the season, the best ranked team is declared "Champion de France" and is granted a spot in the EHF Champions League's group stage.

The last ranked team (14th) is relegated to the lower echelon of women's handball Division 2 Féminine (D2F) and replaced by the top-ranked D2F team that possesses the VAP status.

Teams receive three points for a win, two points for a draw and one point for a loss.

=== European qualification ===
Currently the Champion of France is granted a spot in the EHF Champions League's group stage. Runner-up is qualified for the EHF European League but is able to apply for a wildcard (upgrade) to participate in the Champions League. The winner of the Coupe de France is qualified for the EHF European League. If a qualified team declines to participate in the European League, the next best-ranked team in the league can apply to take their place. A number of the league's other top teams are eligible to participate in European competitions.

The number of teams per national federation qualified for European competitions (EHF Champions League and EHF European League) is determined by a federation's EHF coefficient and EHF rank. Each year, the EHF publishes a ranking that announces the place attribution for the following season (number of teams for each Federation in the various competitions).

For the 2023/24 season, the system changed. The coefficients and ranks were not determined by the overall performance of a federation, as it used to be. The performances are separated by competitions (e.g.: good performance by french teams in the Champions League would not allocate more places for french teams in the European League). Thus, the new system includes separate rankings for the Champions League and the European League.

Place distribution for 2023/24 Women's EHF Club competitions - France's place attribution:

- EHF Champions League (EHF CL): 1 place
- EHF European League (EHF EL): 3 places

The Champions League has 7 other spots open for clubs that are not national champions but have qualified for the European League (1 spot for the best seeded Federation of the EHF EL and 6 spots open for upgrades). The EHF European League has 8 spots open in for upgrades.

A club needs to fulfill set technical and organizational or administrative requirements to be able to play in European competitions (finances, adequate playing hall, etc.).

== List of champions ==
Note - former names of clubs:

- Brest Bretagne Handball: Arvor 29
- ES Colombes: CSA Molière
- JDA Dijon Bourgogne HB: CSL Dijon & Cercle Dijon Bourgogne
- Mérignac Handball: Sport athlétique mérignacais
- Metz Handball: ASPTT Metz, HB Metz métropole
- Neptunes de Nantes: Nantes Atlantique HB
- Paris 92: Issy-les-Moulineaux & Issy Paris Hand
- Stade nantais université club: SNUC Atlantique / Stade Nantes UCA
- Toulon Métropole Var HB: Toulon Saint-Cyr Var HB

Season	Nr	Edition	Winner	Second or finalist	Third or semi-finalist
1951-1952	41	1	**École Simon-Siégel** (1)	Paris UC	Fémina Sport and CA Saint-Fons
1952-1953		2	**École Simon-Siégel** (2)	US Metro	CA Saint-Fons and CSL Dijon
1953-1954		3	**École Simon-Siégel** (3)	Bordeaux EC	-
1954-1955		4	**Bordeaux EC** (1)	Stade français	-
1955-1956		5	**Stade français** (1)	Bordeaux EC	-
1956-1957		6	**CSA Molière**	-	-
1957-1958		7	**US Ivry** (1)	École Simon-Siégel	-
1958-1959		8	**US Ivry** (2)	Paris UC	-
1959-1960		9	**US Ivry** (3)	Bordeaux EC	-
1960-1961		10	**SNUC Atlantique**	École Simon-Siégel	-
1961-1962		11	**Bordeaux EC** (2)	US Ivry	-
1962-1963		12	**US Ivry** (4)	École Simon-Siégel	-
1963-1964		13	**US Ivry** (5)	CA Saint-Fons	École Simon-Siégel et Stade français
1964-1965		14	**ES Colombes** (1)	US Ivry	-
1965-1966		15	**ES Colombes** (2)	US Ivry	-
1966-1967	20	16	**Stade Marseillais UC**	ES Colombes	US Ivry et Stade Nantes UCA
1967-1968		17	**ES Colombes** (3)	US Ivry	-
1968-1969		18	**US Ivry** (6)	Stade français	-
1969-1970		19	**US Ivry** (7)	Paris UC	-
1970-1971		20	**Stella Saint-Maur**	Paris UC	Bordeaux EC & Stade français
1971-1972		21	**Stade pessacais UC**	ASUL Vaulx-en-Velin	-
1972-1973	16	22	**ASUL Vaulx-en-Velin**	ES Colombes	Bordeaux EC & SNUC
1973-1974		23	**US Ivry** (8)	Paris UC	Pessac & Stade français
1974-1975		24	**Paris UC** (1)	ASUL Vaulx-en-Velin	-
1975-1976		25	**Paris UC** (2)	US Ivry	-
1976-1977		26	**US Ivry** (9)	Bordeaux EC	-
1977-1978		27	**Paris UC** (3)	US Ivry	-
1978-1979		28	**Troyes OS**	Paris UC	-
1979-1980	20	29	**Paris UC** (4)	PLM Conflans	ASU Lyon & Troyes OS
1980-1981	18	30	**Paris UC** (5)	PLM Conflans	Racing Club de France
1981-1982	18	31	**US Dunkerque**	Paris UC	PLM Conflans
1982-1983	18	32	**Bordeaux EC** (3)	Paris UC	ASU Lyon
1983-1984	18	33	**Stade français** (2)	US Dunkerque	ES Besançon
1984-1985	10	34	**USM Gagny** (1)	ASUL Vaulx-en-Velin	Bordeaux Étudiants Club
1985-1986	10	35	**Stade français Issy-les-Moulineaux** (3)	USM Gagny	ES Besançon
1986-1987	10	36	**USM Gagny 93** (2)	Stade français Issy-les-Moulineaux	ES Besançon
1987-1988	10	37	**ES Besançon** (1)	Stade français Issy-les-Moulineaux	USM Gagny
1988-1989	12	38	**ASPTT Metz** (1)	USM Gagny 93	ES Besançon
1989-1990	12	39	**ASPTT Metz** (2)	USM Gagny 93	ASUL Vaulx-en-Velin
1990-1991	12	40	**USM Gagny 93** (3)	ASPTT Metz	CSL Dijon
1991-1992	12	41	**USM Gagny 93** (4)	ASPTT Metz	-
1992-1993	12	42	**ASPTT Metz** (3)	USM Gagny 93	CSL Dijon
1993-1994	12	43	**ASPTT Metz** (4)	USM Gagny 93	AL Bouillargues
1994-1995	10	44	**ASPTT Metz** (5)	Stade béthunois	Stade français Issy-les-Moulineaux
1995-1996	10	45	**ASPTT Metz** (6)	ES Besançon	Stade français Issy-les-Moulineaux
1996-1997	10	46	**ASPTT Metz** (7)	ES Besançon	ASUL Vaulx-en-Velin
1997-1998	10	47	**ES Besançon** (2)	ASPTT Metz	ASUL Vaulx-en-Velin
1998-1999	10	48	**ASPTT Metz** (8)	ES Besançon	HBC Nîmes
1999-2000	10	49	**ASPTT Metz** (9)	ES Besançon	SA Mérignacais
2000-2001	12	50	**ES Besançon** (3)	ASPTT Metz	Sun A.L. Bouillargues
2001-2002	12	51	**ASPTT Metz** (10)	ES Besançon	Cercle Dijon Bourgogne
2002-2003	12	52	**ES Besançon** (4)	ASPTT Metz	Cercle Dijon Bourgogne
2003-2004	12	53	**HB Metz métropole** (11)	ES Besançon	CJF Fleury-les-Aubrais
2004-2005	12	54	**HB Metz métropole** (12)	ES Besançon	CJF Fleury-les-Aubrais
2005-2006	12	55	**HB Metz métropole** (13)	Le Havre AC	Mérignac Handball
2006-2007	12	56	**HB Metz métropole** (14)	Le Havre AC	Cercle Dijon Bourgogne
2007-2008	12	57	**HB Metz métropole** (15)	Le Havre AC	Issy-les-Moulineaux
2008-2009	11	58	**Metz Handball** (16)	Le Havre AC	HBC Nîmes
2009-2010	10	59	**Toulon Saint-Cyr VHB**	Le Havre AC	Metz Handball
2010-2011	11	60	**Metz Handball** (17)	Arvor 29	Toulon Saint-Cyr VHB
2011-2012	10	61	**Arvor 29**	Issy Paris Hand	Metz Handball
2012-2013	10	63	**Metz Handball** (18)	CJF Fleury-les-Aubrais	Issy Paris Hand
2013-2014	10	63	**Metz Handball** (19)	Issy Paris Hand	Le Havre AC
2014-2015	10	64	**CJF Fleury Loiret Handball**	Issy Paris Hand	Metz Handball
2015-2016	10	65	**Metz Handball** (20)	CJF Fleury-les-Aubrais	Issy Paris Hand
2016-2017	11	66	**Metz Handball** (21)	Brest Bretagne Handball	Issy Paris Hand
2017-2018	12	67	**Metz Handball** (22)	Brest Bretagne Handball	ES Besançon
2018-2019	12	68	**Metz Handball** (23)	OGC Nice Handball	Brest Bretagne Handball
2019-2020	12	69	Not awarded due to the COVID-19 pandemic. Brest and Metz were 1st ex-aequo.		
2020-2021	14	70	**Brest Bretagne Handball** (2)	Metz Handball	ES Besançon
2021-2022	14	71	**Metz Handball** (24)	Brest Bretagne Handball	Paris 92
2022-2023	14	72	**Metz Handball** (25)	Brest Bretagne Handball	Neptunes de Nantes
2023-2024	14	73	**Metz Handball** (26)	Brest Bretagne Handball	Neptunes de Nantes
2024-2025	14	74	**Metz Handball** (27)	Brest Bretagne Handball	Jeanne d'Arc Dijon Handball
2025-2026	14	74	**Brest Bretagne Handball** (3)	Metz Handball	Chambray Touraine Handball

=== Performance by club ===
Rank	Club	Titles	Winning seasons
1	**Metz Handball**	27	1989, 1990, 1993, 1994, 1995, 1996, 1997, 1999, 2000, 2002, 2004, 2005, 2006, 2007, 2008, 2009, 2011, 2013, 2014, 2016, 2017, 2018, 2019, 2022, 2023, 2024, 2025
2	US Ivry	9	1958, 1959, 1960, 1963, 1964, 1969, 1970, 1974 & 1977
3	Paris UC	5	1975, 1976, 1978, 1980 & 1981
4	ES Colombes / CSA Molière	4	1957, 1965, 1966 & 1968
4	USM Gagny	4	1985, 1987, 1991 & 1992
4	**ES Besançon**	4	1988, 1998, 2001 & 2003
6	École Simon-Siégel	3	1952, 1953 & 1954
6	Bordeaux EC	3	1955, 1962 & 1983
6	Stade français Issy-les-Moulineaux	3	1956, 1984 & 1986
6	**Brest Bretagne Handball**	2012, 2021, 2026	
11	Stade Nantais UC	1	1961
11	Stade Marseillais UC	1	1967
11	**Stella Saint-Maur**	1	1971
11	Stade Pessacais UC	1	1972
11	ASUL Vaulx-en-Velin	1	1973
11	Troyes OS	1	1979
11	US Dunkerque	1	1982
11	**Toulon Saint-Cyr Var HB**	1	2010
11	CJF Fleury Loiret Handball	1	2015
-	not awarded	1	2020
Total		73	1951-2023

**Legend** :

- 10 titles won
- **Bold** indicates clubs that are still playing in the top league

=== Medal table ===
Team	**Gold**	**Silver**	**Bronze**
**Metz Handball**	**27**	7	3
US Ivry	9	**8**	1
Paris UC	5	**8**	0
**ES Besançon**	4	7	**6**
USM Gagny	4	5	1
ES Colombes	4	2	0
**Brest Bretagne Handball**	3	7	1
Stade français Issy-les-Moulineaux	3	3	5
École Simon-Siégel	3	3	1
Bordeaux EC	3	2	3
ASUL Vaulx-en-Velin	1	3	5
Fleury Loiret Handball	1	2	2
US Dunkerque	1	1	0
SNUC Atlantique	1	0	2
Toulon Métropole Var Handball	1	0	1
Troyes OS	1	0	1
Stade pessacais UC	1	0	1
Stade Marseillais UC	1	0	0
**Stella Saint-Maur**	1	0	0
Le Havre AC	0	5	1
**Paris 92**	0	3	5
PLM Conflans	0	2	1
CA Saint-Fons	0	1	1
**OGC Nice Handball**	0	1	0
Stade béthunois	0	1	0
**JDA Dijon Bourgogne HB**	0	0	6
HBC Nîmes	0	0	2
Sun A.L. Bouillargues	0	0	2
**Mérignac Handball**	0	0	2
**Neptunes de Nantes**	0	0	2
Fémina Sport	0	0	1
Racing Club de France	0	0	1
**Chambray Touraine Handball**	0	0	1

== Media coverage ==
=== Free ===
- Moselle TV (local TV channel) broadcasts a few of Metz Handball home matches.
- Tébéo (local TV channel) broadcasts a few of Brest Bretagne Handball home matches.

=== Pay-to-watch ===
"Handball TV": For the 2022-23 handball season, the French Federation of Handball launched its own subscription video on-demand over-the-top streaming service:

- It re-broadcasts the live feeds of free TV channels (that broadcast matches).
- it also broadcasts live some exclusive matches produced by the platform and TV channel BeIN Sports (since 2023-24, the channel broadcasts the biggest fixture of a match day).
- VODs (replays) of most broadcast matches.

Free TV channel Sport en France used to broadcast some matches (BeIN Sports took the official broadcaster slot since 2023-24).

== Notable foreign players ==
List of foreign players who previously played or currently play in the LFH Division 1 Féminine. Bold indicate players currently playing in the league (2023/2024).

Algeria

- (Algeria) Nadia Belakhdar
- (Algeria) Nabila Tizi

Angola

- (Angola) **Stelvia de Jesus Pascoal**
- (Angola) Isabel Guialo
- (Angola) Ruth João

Argentina

- (Argentina) Joana Bolling
- (Argentina) Elke Karsten
- (Argentina) Luciana Mendoza
- (Argentina) **Rosario Urban**

Australia

- (Australia) Catherine Kent
- (Australia) Manon Livingstone

Austria

- (Austria) Gorica Aćimović
- (Austria) Petra Blazek
- (Austria) Sonja Frey

Belarus

- (Belarus) Natallia Vasileuskaya

Belgium

- (Belgium) **Nele Antonissen**

Brazil

- (Brazil) Moniky Bancilon
- (Brazil) Ana Paula Belo
- (Brazil) Adriana Cardoso de Castro
- (Brazil) Deonise Cavaleiro
- (Brazil) Bruna de Paula
- (Brazil) Fabiana Diniz
- (Brazil) Alexandra do Nascimento
- (Brazil) Elaine Gomes
- (Brazil) Mayara Moura
- (Brazil) Gabriela Moreschi
- (Brazil) Jacqueline Oliveira Santana
- (Brazil) Mayssa Pessoa
- (Brazil) Silvia Pinheiro
- (Brazil) Samira Rocha

Cameroon

- (Cameroon) Lisa Atangana
- (Cameroon) **Paola Ebanga Baboga**

Croatia

- (Croatia) Maida Arslanagić
- (Croatia) Sonja Bašić
- (Croatia) **Mia Brkić**
- (Croatia) Klaudija Bubalo
- (Croatia) Ivana Dežić
- (Croatia) Dragica Džono
- (Croatia) Kristina Elez
- (Croatia) Lidija Horvat
- (Croatia) Ivana Kapitanović
- (Croatia) Petra Marinović
- (Croatia) Ćamila Mičijević
- (Croatia) Ivana Lovrić
- (Croatia) **Tena Petika**
- (Croatia) **Sara Sablić**

Cuba

- (Cuba) Eyatne Rizo

Czech Republic

- (Czech Republic) Klára Černá
- (Czech Republic) Lenka Černá
- (Czech Republic) Charlotte Cholevová
- (Czech Republic) Markéta Hurychová
- **(Czech Republic) Kamila Kordovská**
- (Czech Republic) Petra Kudláčková
- (Czech Republic) Iveta Luzumová
- (Czech Republic) Veronika Malá
- (Czech Republic) Pavla Poznarová
- (Czech Republic) Helena Ryšánková
- (Czech Republic) Barbora Raníková
- (Czech Republic) Lucie Satrapová
- (Czech Republic) Helena Štěrbová

Democratic Republic of the Congo

- (Democratic Republic of the Congo) Luisa Makubanza
- (Democratic Republic of the Congo) Estel Memana
- (Democratic Republic of the Congo) Christianne Mwasesa
- (Democratic Republic of the Congo) Simone Thiero

Denmark

- (Denmark) Melanie Bak
- (Denmark) Louise Burgaard
- (Denmark) Stine Bodholt Nielsen
- (Denmark) Sofia Deen
- (Denmark) Lotte Grigel
- (Denmark) **Anne Mette Hansen**
- (Denmark) **Mirja Lyngsø Jensen**
- (Denmark) Kristina Jørgensen
- (Denmark) Mai Kragballe Nielsen
- (Denmark) Ida Lagerbon
- (Denmark) **Stine Nørklit Lønborg**
- (Denmark) Mia Møldrup
- (Denmark) **Nadia Offendal**
- (Denmark) **Julie Pontoppidan**
- (Denmark) Jane Schumacher
- (Denmark) Sandra Toft
- (Denmark) Line Uno
- (Denmark) Ditte Vind
- (Denmark) Anna Wierzba
- (Denmark) Maria Berger Wierzba
- (Denmark) Fie Woller

Egypt

- (Egypt) **Ehsan Abdelmalek**

Germany

- (Germany) Dinah Eckerle
- (Germany) **Katharina Filter**
- (Germany) Alina Grijseels
- (Germany) Isabell Klein
- (Germany) **Annika Lott**
- (Germany) Ewgenija Minevskaja
- (Germany) Maike Schirmer
- (Germany) Luisa Schulze
- (Germany) Xenia Smits
- (Germany) Aimée von Pereira
- (Germany) **Lisa Vlug**

Hungary

- (Hungary) Viktória Csáki
- (Hungary) Andrea Farkas
- (Hungary) Ágnes Hornyák
- (Hungary) Szabina Mayer
- (Hungary) Krisztina Pigniczki
- (Hungary) Szimonetta Planéta
- (Hungary) Szabina Tápai

Iceland

- (Iceland) Karen Knútsdóttir
- (Iceland) Arna Sif Pálsdóttir
- (Iceland) Ramune Pekarskyte
- (Iceland) Hrafnhildur Hanna Þrastardóttir

Italy

- (Italy) **Irene Fanton**

Ivory Coast

- (Ivory Coast) Paula Gondo-Bredou

Japan

- (Japan) Sakura Hauge

Montenegro

- (Montenegro) Jasna Boljević
- (Montenegro) Tatjana Brnović
- (Montenegro) **Nada Ćorović**
- (Montenegro) Itana Grbić
- (Montenegro) Đurđina Jauković
- (Montenegro) Marija Jovanović
- (Montenegro) Đurđina Malović
- (Montenegro) Jasna Tošković
- (Montenegro) **Milica Trifunović**
- (Montenegro) Dijana Ujkić
- (Montenegro) Marina Vukčević

Netherlands

- (Netherlands) Lois Abbingh
- (Netherlands) Debbie Bont
- (Netherlands) Yvette Broch
- (Netherlands) Merel Freriks
- (Netherlands) Jasmina Janković
- (Netherlands) Isabelle Jongenelen
- (Netherlands) Jessy Kramer
- (Netherlands) Jurswailly Luciano
- (Netherlands) Anouk Nieuwenweg
- (Netherlands) Charris Rozemalen
- (Netherlands) Esther Schop
- (Netherlands) Martine Smeets
- (Netherlands) **Laura van der Heijden**
- (Netherlands) Sanne van Olphen
- (Netherlands) Marieke van der Wal
- (Netherlands) Pearl van der Wissel
- (Netherlands) Kelly Vollebregt
- (Netherlands) **Kristy Zimmerman**

North Macedonia

- (North Macedonia) Dragica Kresoja
- (North Macedonia) Jovana Micevska
- (North Macedonia) **Iva Mladenovska**
- (North Macedonia) Julija Portjanko

Norway

- (Norway) **Mari Finstad Bergum**
- (Norway) Camilla Carstens
- (Norway) Helene Gigstad Fauske
- (Norway) Rikke Marie Granlund
- (Norway) Anette Helene Hansen
- (Norway) Malin Holta
- (Norway) **Tonje Haug Lerstad**
- (Norway) Tonje Løseth
- (Norway) Karoline Lund
- (Norway) **Kristina Novak**
- (Norway) Hanna Bredal Oftedal
- (Norway) Stine Bredal Oftedal
- (Norway) Siv Heim Sæbøe
- (Norway) **Elise Skinnehaugen**
- (Norway) Emma Skinnehaugen
- (Norway) Mie Sophie Sando
- (Norway) **Celine Sivertsen**
- (Norway) Silje Solberg
- (Norway) Pernille Wibe

Poland

- (Poland) Marta Gęga
- (Poland) Katarzyna Janiszewska
- (Poland) Monika Kobylińska
- (Poland) Aneta Łabuda
- (Poland) Natalia Nosek
- (Poland) **Adrianna Płaczek**
- (Poland) Aleksandra Rosiak
- (Poland) Monika Stachowska
- (Poland) Karolina Siódmiak
- (Poland) Ewa Urtnowska
- (Poland) Paulina Uścinowicz
- (Poland) Joanna Wołoszyk
- (Poland) Karolina Zalewska
- (Poland) Aleksandra Zych

Portugal

- (Portugal) **Carolina Loureiro**
- (Portugal) Joana Resende

Republic of Congo

- (Republic of the Congo) Joséphine Nkou

Romania

- (Romania) Carmen Amariei
- (Romania) Melinda Geiger
- (Romania) Ionica Munteanu
- (Romania) Elena Napăr
- (Romania) Crina Pintea
- (Romania) Ionela Stanca

Russia

- (Russia) Ekaterina Andryushina
- (Russia) Yulia Khavronina
- (Russia) Valeriia Maslova
- (Russia) **Anna Vyakhireva**

Senegal

- (Senegal) Doungou Camara
- (Senegal) **Raïssa Dapina**
- (Senegal) Laura Kamdop
- (Senegal) Hawa N'Diaye
- (Senegal) Amina Sankharé
- (Senegal) **Dienaba Sy**

Serbia

- (Serbia) **Jovana Bogojević**
- (Serbia) **Marija Čolić**
- (Serbia) Biljana Filipović
- (Serbia) **Gordana Mitrović**
- (Serbia) Kristina Liščević
- (Serbia) Tatjana Medved
- (Serbia) Svetlana Ognjenović
- (Serbia) Slađana Pop-Lazić
- (Serbia) Jelena Popović
- (Serbia) Dijana Radojević
- (Serbia) **Dijana Števin**
- (Serbia) **Jovana Stoiljković**
- (Serbia) Katarina Tomašević

Slovakia

- (Slovakia) **Adriána Holejová**
- (Slovakia) Monika Rajnohová
- (Slovakia) Martina Školková

Slovenia

- (Slovenia) Aneja Beganovič
- (Slovenia) Ana Gros
- (Slovenia) Nina Jeriček
- (Slovenia) Lina Krhlikar
- (Slovenia) Amra Pandžić
- (Slovenia) Tjaša Stanko
- (Slovenia) Maja Vojnović

South Korea

- (South Korea) Ryu Eun-hee

Spain

- (Spain) Nely Carla Alberto
- (Spain) Jessica Alonso
- (Spain) Alexandrina Cabral
- (Spain) Carmen Campos
- (Spain) Mercedes Castellanos
- (Spain) Elisabet Cesáreo
- (Spain) **Elisabeth Chávez**
- (Spain) Darly de Paula
- (Spain) Patricia Elorza
- (Spain) Beatriz Escribano
- (Spain) Beatriz Fernández
- (Spain) Magdalena Fernández-Agusti
- (Spain) Paula García Ávila
- (Spain) Kaba Gassama
- (Spain) Lara González Ortega
- (Spain) Mireya González
- (Spain) Marta López
- (Spain) Marta Mangué
- (Spain) Carmen Martín
- (Spain) María Muñoz Juan
- (Spain) María Núñez
- (Spain) Paula Valdivia Monserrat
- (Spain) **Nicole Wiggins**

Sweden

- (Sweden) **Hanna Åhlén**
- (Sweden) **Jenny Carlson**
- (Sweden) Kristina Flognman
- (Sweden) Tina Flognman
- (Sweden) Hanna Fogelström
- (Sweden) Cecilia Grubbström
- (Sweden) Isabelle Gulldén
- (Sweden) Nathalie Hagman
- (Sweden) Filippa Idéhn
- (Sweden) Therese Islas Helgesson
- (Sweden) **Anna Lagerquist**
- (Sweden) Clara Monti Danielsson
- (Sweden) **Frida Rosell**
- (Sweden) **Jessica Ryde**
- (Sweden) Louise Sand
- (Sweden) **Malin Sandberg**
- (Sweden) **Carin Strömberg**
- (Sweden) Frida Tegstedt
- (Sweden) Ulrika Toft Hansen
- (Sweden) Cassandra Tollbring
- (Sweden) Linnea Torstenson
- (Sweden) Angelica Wallén

Switzerland

- (Switzerland) **Daphne Gautschi**
- (Switzerland) Lea Schüpbach

Tunisia

- (Tunisia) Haifa Abdelhak
- (Tunisia) Noura Ben Slama
- (Tunisia) Takoua Chabchoub
- (Tunisia) Mouna Chebbah
- (Tunisia) Maroua Dhaouadi
- (Tunisia) Asma Elghaoui
- (Tunisia) Ines Khouildi
- (Tunisia) Ouided Kilani
- (Tunisia) Rafika Marzouk
- (Tunisia) **Rakia Rezgui**
- (Tunisia) Faten Yahiaoui

Ukraine

- (Ukraine) Liliia Gorilska
- (Ukraine) Olha Nikolayenko
- (Ukraine) Olga Perederiy
- (Ukraine) Anastasiia Pidpalova
- (Ukraine) Yuliya Snopova

== EHF league ranking ==
EHF League Ranking for 2022/23 season:

- 1. (1) (Hungary) Nemzeti Bajnokság I (157.67)
- 2. (5) (France) Ligue Butagaz Énergie (118.50)
- 3. (2) (Russia) Russian Superleague (114.50)
- 4. (3) (Denmark) Bambusa Kvindeligaen (109.00)
- 5. (6) (Norway) REMA 1000-ligaen (102.77)
- 6. (4) (Romania) Liga Națională (94.50)

== See also ==
- Coupe de France
- LFH Division 2 Féminine, the lower echelon French women's league
- LNH Division 1 (Liqui Moly Starligue), the corresponding men's competition
- LNH Division 2 (ProLigue), the corresponding men's competition
- List of handball clubs in France
- Women's sports
