= 2025–26 LNH Division 1 =

LNH Division 1
- Season: 2025–26
- Dates: 5 September 2025 – 6 June 2026
- Champions: Paris Saint-Germain; 13th title
- Relegated: Istres Provence Handball; Dijon Métropole Handball
- Champions League: Paris Saint-Germain; HBC Nantes; Montpellier Handball
- European League: Limoges Handball; Chambéry SMB HB; Saint-Raphaël VHB
- Matches: 240
- Goals: 15,007 (62.53 per match)
- Top goalscorer: Aymeric Minne (226 goals)

The 2025–26 LNH Division 1, also known as Liqui Moly Starligue for sponsorship reasons, was the 74th season of the LNH Division 1, France's premier handball league. The season began on 5 September 2025 and concluded on 6 June 2026.

== Teams ==
2025–26 Starligue teams

=== Team changes ===
Promoted from 2024–25 LNH Division 2	Relegated from 2024–25 LNH Division 1
Dijon Métropole Handball; Sélestat Alsace Handball	US Créteil; US Ivry

=== Stadiums ===
Team	City	Venue	Capacity
C' Chartres MHB	Chartres	Halle Jean-Cochet	1,200
Cesson Rennes MHB	Cesson-Sévigné	Glaz Arena	4,500
Chambéry SMB HB	Chambéry	Le Phare	4,500
Dijon Métropole Handball	Dijon	Palais des sports Jean-Michel-Geoffroy	3,295
Dunkerque HGL	Dunkerque	Stade des Flandres	2,400
Fenix Toulouse	Toulouse	Palais des Sports André-Brouat	4,397
HBC Nantes	Nantes	H Arena	5,500
Istres Provence Handball	Istres	Halle polyvalente	1,500
Limoges Handball	Limoges	Palais des Sports de Beaublanc	5,516
Montpellier Handball	Montpellier	FDI Stadium	3,000
Paris Saint-Germain	Paris	Stade Pierre de Coubertin	3,400
Pays d'Aix UC	Aix-en-Provence	Arena du Pays d'Aix	6,004
Saint-Raphaël VHB	Saint-Raphaël	Palais des sports J-F Krakowski	2,500
Sélestat Alsace Handball	Sélestat	Centre Sportif Intercommunal	2,300
Tremblay Handball	Tremblay-en-France	Palais des Sports	1,020
USAM Nîmes	Nîmes	Le Parnasse	4,191

== League table ==
Pos	Team	Pld	W	D	L	GF	GA	GD	Pts	Qualification or relegation
1	Paris Saint-Germain	30	29	1	0	1041	841	+200	59	Qualification for the Champions League
2	HBC Nantes	30	26	3	1	1090	907	+183	55	Qualification for the Champions League
3	Montpellier Handball	30	21	1	8	1017	909	+108	43	Qualification for the Champions League
4	Limoges Handball	30	19	2	9	997	956	+41	40	Qualification for the European League
5	Chambéry SMB HB	30	16	5	9	962	947	+15	37	Qualification for the European League
6	Saint-Raphaël VHB	30	18	1	11	971	948	+23	37	Qualification for the European League
7	Fenix Toulouse	30	15	1	14	910	907	+3	31	
8	Tremblay Handball	30	13	3	14	982	995	−13	29	
9	Pays d'Aix UC	30	13	3	14	908	890	+18	29	
10	Cesson Rennes MHB	30	12	1	17	937	953	−16	25	
11	USAM Nîmes	30	9	3	18	891	936	−45	21	
12	Sélestat Alsace Handball	30	7	3	20	905	966	−61	17	
13	Dunkerque HGL	30	6	4	20	816	931	−115	16	
14	C' Chartres MHB	30	6	3	21	864	987	−123	15	
15	Istres Provence Handball	30	6	2	22	850	965	−115	14	Relegation to LNH Division 2
16	Dijon Métropole Handball	30	5	2	23	866	969	−103	12	Relegation to LNH Division 2

Updated to match(es) played on 6 June 2026. Source: LNH
Rules for classification: 1) points; 2) head-to-head points; 3) head-to-head goal difference; 4) head-to-head number of goals scored; 5) goal difference; 6) goals scored.

== Results ==
Home \ Away	CCH	CES	CHA	DIJ	DUN	TOU	NAN	IST	LIM	MON	PSG	AIX	STR	SEL	TRE	NIM
C' Chartres MHB	—	28–31	31–34	23–28	24–25	33–32	27–41	27–28	30–39	29–33	26–34	30–30	24–24	33–39	28–34	33–31
Cesson Rennes MHB	39–32	—	35–31	36–32	33–25	34–26	26–35	31–30	30–31	31–40	31–34	31–25	30–34	31–37	31–32	35–31
Chambéry SMB HB	33–30	29–27	—	30–28	32–28	31–33	34–34	30–28	32–39	31–35	28–29	31–29	35–33	33–24	36–33	31–31
Dijon Métropole Handball	29–28	33–33	30–34	—	31–24	29–31	34–48	39–31	30–35	28–38	27–34	25–29	27–32	27–32	31–36	28–25
Dunkerque HGL	25–24	22–30	29–33	32–27	—	27–31	30–34	31–29	32–35	28–36	25–29	25–30	22–32	26–27	27–27	29–27
Fenix Toulouse	41–29	31–28	30–30	27–24	36–27	—	25–30	35–23	31–37	27–33	33–36	25–29	27–36	38–32	40–35	27–22
HBC Nantes	40–27	43–30	42–32	42–32	26–22	28–22	—	34–28	41–35	35–32	31–31	34–28	46–32	33–32	41–32	36–34
Istres Provence Handball	26–28	32–27	27–33	28–28	32–32	19–29	31–40	—	25–35	27–34	29–39	35–31	35–32	23–33	36–30	27–36
Limoges Handball	36–29	28–30	35–37	32–31	39–29	30–35	35–40	30–26	—	31–30	28–32	30–27	31–32	29–29	38–34	33–33
Montpellier Handball	37–30	36–34	28–21	30–21	38–27	29–28	31–31	33–28	38–32	—	30–32	29–33	44–34	35–30	36–31	34–30
Paris Saint-Germain	40–20	38–33	33–26	35–27	32–28	39–21	34–31	40–25	40–25	34–31	—	32–28	36–34	36–28	35–31	31–29
Pays d'Aix UC	29–31	35–28	32–32	38–32	33–22	38–31	28–29	28–24	30–32	29–30	24–37	—	26–31	31–29	30–31	32–26
Saint-Raphaël VHB	37–30	30–28	33–36	35–34	35–27	33–28	32–33	35–34	29–31	38–35	25–33	27–26	—	31–28	30–36	31–28
Sélestat Alsace Handball	32–36	28–34	33–33	32–28	30–30	26–28	33–41	23–27	32–38	33–38	23–34	24–31	29–33	—	34–38	33–28
Tremblay Handball	35–35	34–32	33–40	34–25	28–29	32–23	27–33	33–29	34–37	36–35	31–38	32–32	36–44	34–32	—	36–29
USAM Nîmes	25–29	31–28	35–34	24–21	31–31	28–39	31–38	29–28	28–31	30–29	33–34	35–37	33–27	29–27	29–27	—

Updated to match(es) played on 6 June 2026. Source: LNH
Legend: Blue = home team win; Yellow = draw; Red = away team win.

== Top goalscorers ==
Rank	Player	Club	Goals
1	(France) Aymeric Minne	HBC Nantes	226
2	(France) Mattéo Fadhuile	Tremblay Handball	204
3	(Portugal) Diogo Oliveira	Dunkerque HGL	203
4	(Serbia) Nemanja Ilić	Fenix Toulouse	199
5	(France) Drevy Paschal	Saint-Raphaël VHB	174
6	(France) Xavier Labigang	Cesson Rennes MHB	167
7	(France) Elio Zammit	Chambéry SMB HB	162
7	(Egypt) Yahia Omar	Paris Saint-Germain	162
9	(France) Elohim Prandi	Paris Saint-Germain	153
10	(Ukraine) Ihor Turchenko	Limoges Handball	152

== Awards ==
The awards were announced on 9 June 2026.

Position	Player	Club
Most valuable player	(France) Aymeric Minne	Nantes
Best coach	(Serbia) Grégory Cojean	Nantes
Best prospect	(France) Emilien Peyronnet	Chambéry

=== All-star team ===
The all-star team was announced on 2 June 2026.

Position	Player	Club
Goalkeeper	(Guinea) Rubens Pierre	Tremblay
Left wing	(France) Drevy Paschal	Saint-Raphaël
Left back	(France) Thibaud Briet	Nantes
Centre back	(France) Aymeric Minne	Nantes
Pivot	(France) Nicolas Tournat	Nantes
Right back	(France) Valentin Porte	Montpellier
Right wing	(Spain) David Balaguer	Montpellier
Defender	(France) Thibaud Briet	Nantes
