= 2021–22 LNH Division 1 =

LNH Division 1
- Season: 2021–22
- Dates: 10 September 2021 – 8 June 2022
- Champion: Paris Saint-Germain; 9th title
- Relegated: Saran Loiret; Grand Nancy Métropole
- Champions League: Paris Saint-Germain; HBC Nantes
- European League: Pays d'Aix UC; Montpellier; Chambéry
- Matches played: 240
- Top goalscorer: Dragan Gajić (228 goals)

The 2021–22 LNH Division 1 (known as the Liqui Moly StarLigue for sponsorship reasons) was the 70th season of the LNH Division 1, French premier handball league and the 45th season consisting of only one league. It ram from 10 September 2021 to 8 June 2022.

Paris Saint-Germain won their ninth title.

== Teams ==
Locations of the 2020–21 LNH Division 1

=== Team changes ===
Promoted from 2020–21 LNH Division 2	Relegated from 2020–21 LNH Division 1
Saran; Nancy	Ivry; Tremblay

=== Arenas and locations ===
The following 16 clubs compete in the LNH Division 1 during the 2021–22 season:

Team	Location	Arena	Capacity
Aix	Aix-en-Provence	Arena du Pays d'Aix	6,004
Cesson-Rennes	Cesson-Sévigné	Glaz Arena	4,500
Chartres	Chartres	Halle Jean-Cochet	1,200
Chambéry	Chambéry	Le Phare	4,423
Créteil	Créteil	Palais des Sports Robert Oubron	2,398
Dunkerque	Dunkerque	Stade des Flandres	2,400
Istres	Istres	Halle polyvalente	1,600
Limoges	Limoges	Salle Henri-Normand	1,168
Montpellier	Montpellier	Sud de France Arena; Palais des sports René-Bougnol	9,000; 2,870
Nancy	Nancy	Parc des sports de Vandœuvre Nations	1,150
Nantes	Nantes	Palais des Sports	5,902
Nîmes	Nîmes	Le Parnasse	4,191
Paris Saint-Germain	Paris	Stade Pierre de Coubertin	4,016
Saint-Raphaël	Saint-Raphaël	Palais des sports J-F Krakowski	2,000
Saran	Saran	Halle du Bois Joly	950
Toulouse	Toulouse	Palais des Sports André-Brouat	3,850

== League table ==
Pos	Team	Pld	W	D	L	GF	GA	GD	Pts	Qualification or relegation
1	Paris Saint-Germain (C)	30	30	0	0	1103	871	+232	60	Qualification for Champions League group phase
2	Nantes	30	24	1	5	965	818	+147	49	Qualification for Champions League group phase
3	Aix	30	21	2	7	900	840	+60	44	Qualification for European League group phase
4	Montpellier	30	20	1	9	935	859	+76	41	Qualification for European League second qualifying round
5	Chambéry	30	19	1	10	909	855	+54	39	Qualification for European League first qualifying round
6	Nîmes	30	16	4	10	903	880	+23	36	
7	Toulouse	30	14	4	12	875	891	−16	32	
8	Saint-Raphaël	30	14	3	13	910	910	0	31	
9	Cesson-Rennes	30	12	3	15	817	856	−39	27	
10	Chartres	30	10	2	18	889	947	−58	22	
11	Créteil	30	9	3	18	893	932	−39	21	
12	Dunkerque	30	10	0	20	911	936	−25	20	
13	Limoges	30	8	2	20	900	942	−42	18	
14	Istres	30	6	5	19	919	960	−41	17	
15	Saran (R)	30	6	0	24	793	905	−112	12	Relegated to LNH Division 2
16	Nancy (R)	30	5	1	24	832	941	−109	11	Relegated to LNH Division 2

Source: LNH
Rules for classification: 1) points; 2) goal difference; 3) goals scored; 4) head-to-head points; 5) head-to-head goal difference; 6) head-to-head number of goals scored.
(C) Champions; (R) Relegated

== Statistics ==
=== Top goalscorers ===
Rank	Player	Club	Goals	Shots	%
1	(Slovenia) Dragan Gajić	Limoges	228	296	77
2	(Egypt) Mohammad Sanad	Nîmes	224	313	72
3	(France) Raphaël Caucheteux	Saint-Raphaël	202	263	77
4	(France) Matthieu Ong	Aix	178	227	78
5	(Spain) Valero Rivera Folch	Nantes	174	231	75
6	(France) Théo Avelange Demouge	Dunkerque	168	220	76
7	(Serbia) Nemanja Ilić	Toulouse	168	223	75
8	(France) Robin Molinié	Cesson-Rennes	164	267	61
9	(Serbia) Vanja Ilić	Chartres	155	214	72
10	(France) Valentin Aman	Créteil	151	190	79

=== Awards ===
The awards were announced on 10 June 2022.

Position	Player	Club
Most valuable player	(Netherlands) Luc Steins	Paris Saint-Germain
Best young	(Spain) Ian Tarrafeta	Aix
Best coach	(Serbia) Danijel Anđelković	Toulouse

=== All-star team ===
The all-star team was announced on 10 June 2022.

Position	Player	Club
Goalkeeper	(Switzerland) Nikola Portner	Chambéry
Left wing	(Iceland) Kristján Örn Kristjánsson	Aix
Left back	(France) Robin Molinié	Cesson-Rennes
Centre back	(Netherlands) Luc Steins	Paris Saint-Germain
Pivot	(Poland) Kamil Syprzak	Paris Saint-Germain
Right back	(France) Matthieu Ong	Aix
Right wing	(Egypt) Mohammad Sanad	Nîmes

== See also ==
- 2021–22 Coupe de France
- 2021–22 Coupe de la Ligue
- 2021–22 LNH Division 2
