= 2024–25 LNH Division 1 =

LNH Division 1
- Season: 2024–25
- Dates: 6 September 2024 – 7 June 2025
- Champions: Paris Saint-Germain; 12th title
- Relegated: US Créteil; US Ivry
- Champions League: Paris Saint-Germain; HBC Nantes
- European League: Montpellier Handball; Fenix Toulouse; Saint-Raphaël VHB
- Matches: 240
- Goals: 14,425 (60.1 per match)
- Top goalscorer: Tom Pelayo (241 goals)

The 2024–25 LNH Division 1, also known as Liqui Moly Starligue for sponsorship reasons, was the 73rd season of the LNH Division 1, France's premier handball league. The season began on 6 September 2024 and ended on 7 June 2025.

== Teams ==
2024–25 Starligue teams

=== Team changes ===
Promoted from 2023–24 LNH Division 2	Relegated from 2023–24 LNH Division 1
Tremblay Handball; Istres Provence Handball	Saran Loiret Handball; Dijon Métropole Handball

=== Stadiums ===
Team	City	Venue	Capacity
C' Chartres MHB	Chartres	Halle Jean-Cochet	1,200
Cesson Rennes MHB	Cesson-Sévigné	Glaz Arena	4,500
Chambéry SMB HB	Chambéry	Le Phare	4,500
Dunkerque HGL	Dunkerque	Stade des Flandres	2,400
Fenix Toulouse	Toulouse	Palais des Sports André-Brouat	4,397
HBC Nantes	Nantes	H Arena	5,500
Istres Provence Handball	Istres	Halle polyvalente	1,500
Limoges Handball	Limoges	Palais des Sports de Beaublanc	5,516
Montpellier Handball	Montpellier	FDI Stadium	3,000
Paris Saint-Germain	Paris	Stade Pierre de Coubertin	3,400
Pays d'Aix UC	Aix-en-Provence	Arena du Pays d'Aix	6,004
Saint-Raphaël VHB	Saint-Raphaël	Palais des sports J-F Krakowski	2,500
Tremblay Handball	Tremblay-en-France	Palais des Sports	1,020
USAM Nîmes	Nîmes	Le Parnasse	4,191
US Créteil	Créteil	Palais des Sports Robert Oubron	2,500
US Ivry	Ivry-sur-Seine	Gymnase Auguste Delaune	1,500

== League table ==
Pos	Team	Pld	W	D	L	GF	GA	GD	Pts	Qualification or relegation
1	Paris Saint-Germain (C)	30	27	2	1	1046	854	+192	56	Qualification for the Champions League group stage
2	HBC Nantes	30	25	2	3	985	830	+155	52	Qualification for the Champions League group stage
3	Montpellier Handball	30	23	2	5	964	806	+158	48	Qualification for the European League group stage
4	Fenix Toulouse	30	18	2	10	922	898	+24	38	Qualification for the European League group stage
5	Saint-Raphaël VHB	30	18	1	11	946	901	+45	37	Qualification for the European League qualification round
6	USAM Nîmes	30	15	4	11	886	861	+25	34	
7	Pays d'Aix UC	30	14	2	14	904	912	−8	30	
8	Limoges Handball	30	14	1	15	904	929	−25	29	
9	Chambéry SMB HB	30	13	2	15	879	888	−9	28	
10	Tremblay Handball	30	12	1	17	887	921	−34	25	
11	Cesson Rennes MHB	30	8	4	18	848	922	−74	20	
12	C' Chartres MHB	30	10	0	20	847	913	−66	20	
13	Dunkerque HGL	30	9	2	19	830	886	−56	20	
14	Istres Provence Handball	30	8	3	19	913	973	−60	19	
15	US Créteil (R)	30	7	1	22	838	949	−111	15	Relegation to LNH Division 2
16	US Ivry (R)	30	4	1	25	826	982	−156	9	Relegation to LNH Division 2

Source: LNH
Rules for classification: 1) points; 2) head-to-head points; 3) head-to-head goal difference; 4) head-to-head number of goals scored; 5) goal difference; 6) goals scored.
(C) Champions; (R) Relegated

== Results ==
Home \ Away	CCH	CES	CHA	DUN	TOU	NAN	IST	LIM	MON	PSG	AIX	STR	TRE	NIM	CRE	IVR
C' Chartres MHB	—	28–33	30–28	30–28	27–31	29–34	37–34	24–26	23–34	25–31	34–29	25–27	30–25	27–31	26–25	35–33
Cesson Rennes MHB	35–31	—	30–24	32–33	28–27	23–34	28–33	24–29	24–33	29–42	28–32	29–39	26–26	26–26	26–24	29–31
Chambéry SMB HB	32–22	29–25	—	28–27	29–25	28–28	35–29	30–28	25–36	31–37	33–29	25–28	27–28	36–31	34–28	35–25
Dunkerque HGL	24–32	31–32	25–30	—	24–27	31–35	28–26	27–34	22–24	27–27	29–32	30–37	28–26	29–24	24–26	27–24
Fenix Toulouse	31–30	33–27	40–33	39–32	—	35–29	39–32	35–32	31–29	28–31	33–31	27–36	32–23	25–25	37–30	31–27
HBC Nantes	32–25	33–22	32–25	30–21	34–29	—	43–31	35–27	29–26	34–31	39–30	36–29	30–24	36–27	25–33	33–29
Istres Provence Handball	32–28	37–37	34–31	28–28	29–30	25–24	—	29–36	26–38	30–34	24–27	29–35	34–30	26–29	33–33	36–25
Limoges Handball	32–28	30–29	34–32	37–34	28–29	30–38	33–27	—	27–37	29–30	27–39	33–27	34–31	30–33	33–36	33–33
Montpellier Handball	37–30	30–23	37–25	24–23	28–28	27–29	36–31	32–26	—	33–33	41–35	31–18	29–25	38–32	38–26	39–23
Paris Saint-Germain	36–26	35–29	30–23	39–31	36–25	34–28	39–31	37–26	29–23	—	37–34	41–34	37–26	36–33	30–19	39–25
Pays d'Aix UC	31–23	29–24	30–27	28–32	31–29	32–32	31–30	25–23	27–31	26–28	—	24–29	25–28	27–27	26–25	34–35
Saint-Raphaël VHB	25–28	27–24	27–27	27–29	36–26	28–31	31–30	35–33	28–30	30–39	38–27	—	31–32	31–27	35–27	35–29
Tremblay Handball	31–30	31–30	29–32	27–26	31–25	27–35	36–34	25–27	31–34	32–40	34–37	39–33	—	28–32	29–30	37–33
USAM Nîmes	30–22	28–28	32–26	29–23	36–29	29–35	29–34	37–31	30–28	28–29	27–29	29–33	26–25	—	30–21	30–21
US Créteil	27–34	29–34	33–29	30–31	26–37	31–38	33–28	29–33	21–28	31–45	35–33	31–39	28–31	42–28	—	27–23
US Ivry	29–28	28–34	19–30	22–26	28–29	22–34	30–31	22–23	26–33	28–41	30–34	33–38	33–40	28–31	32–30	—

Source: LNH
Legend: Blue = home team win; Yellow = draw; Red = away team win.

== Top goalscorers ==
Rank	Player	Club	Goals
1	(France) Tom Pelayo	Dunkerque HGL	241
2	(Poland) Kamil Syprzak	Paris Saint-Germain	197
3	(Serbia) Nemanja Ilić	Fenix Toulouse	171
4	(France) Raphaël Caucheteux	Saint-Raphaël VHB	165
5	(France) Mattéo Fadhuile	Tremblay Handball	162
6	(Ukraine) Ihor Tourtchenko	Limoges Handball	165
7	(France) Benjamin Richert	Chambéry SMB HB / Montpellier Handball	157
8	(Spain) Ian Tarrafeta	Pays d'Aix UC	154
9	(Spain) Mario López Álvarez	US Créteil	146
10	(Spain) Valero Rivera	HBC Nantes	145

== Awards ==
The awards were announced on 10 June 2025.

Position	Player	Club
Most valuable player	(France) Thibaud Briet	Nantes
Best coach	(Serbia) Danijel Anđelković	Toulouse
Best prospect	(France) Eliott Desblancs	Aix

=== All-star team ===
The all-star team was announced on 10 June 2025.

Position	Player	Club
Goalkeeper	(Slovenia) Jože Baznik	Aix
Left wing	(Serbia) Nemanja Ilić	Toulouse
Left back	(France) Thibaud Briet	Nantes
Centre back	(France) Aymeric Minne	Nantes
Pivot	(France) Nicolas Tournat	Nantes
Right back	(France) Tom Pelayo	Dunkerque
Right wing	(France) Benjamin Richert	Chambéry / Montpellier
Defender	(France) Karl Konan	Montpellier
