= LNH Division 1 =

Men's professional handball league in France

- Current season, competition or edition: 2026–27 LNH Division 1
- Sport: Handball
- Founded: 1952; 74 years ago (as Nationale 1)
- First season: 1952–53
- Administrator: LNH
- No. of teams: 16
- Country: France
- Confederation: EHF
- Most recent champion: PSG (13th title) (2025–26)
- Most titles: Montpellier (14 titles)
- Broadcaster: beIN Sports
- Relegation to: LNH Division 2
- Domestic cups: Coupe de France; Coupe de la Ligue; Trophée des Champions
- International cups: EHF Champions League; EHF European League
- Website: LNH.fr

LNH Division 1, doing business as Starligue and currently known as Liqui Moly Starligue for sponsorship reasons, is the premier men's professional handball league in France. It is administered by the Ligue Nationale de Handball, under delegation from the French Handball Federation. Founded in 1952, it is currently contested by 16 teams.

Montpellier Handball is the most successful club with 14 titles, and the club which won the most consecutive titles is Paris Saint-Germain with 11 between 2015 and 2025.

The champion and the vice-champion are directly qualified for the group phase of the EHF Champions League. The winners of the Coupe de France and the Coupe de la Ligue are qualified for the European League. If the winner of (one of) these cups is also the champion, the place(s) are attributed in terms of the Division 1 ranking.

Since 2016, the league has had a title sponsor. Discount retail chain Lidl was the first, paying €1 million per season for the rights (with the exception of the final season, a short term extension signed during the COVID-19 crisis). It was succeeded in 2021 by lubricant manufacturer Liqui Moly.

== Clubs ==
=== 2024–25 Teams ===
Locations of the 2024–25 LNH Division 1

Team	Location	Arena	Capacity	Rank 23-24
Pays d'Aix Université Club	Aix-en-Provence	Complexe sportif du Val de l'Arc; Arena du Pays d'Aix	1,650; 6,004	8th
Cesson Rennes	Cesson-Sévigné	Glaz Arena	4,500	11th
Chambéry	Chambéry	Le Phare	4,400	6th
Chartres Métropole	Chartres	Halle Jean-Cochet	1,200	12th
US Créteil	Créteil	Palais des Sports Robert Oubron	2,500	14th
Dunkerque	Dunkerque	Stade des Flandres	2,400	10th
Istres	Istres	Halle polyvalente	2,000	▲2nd VAP (D2)
US Ivry	Ivry-sur-Seine	Gymnase Auguste-Delaune	1,500	13th
Limoges Handball	Limoges	Palais des Sports de Beaublanc	5,516	5th
Montpellier	Montpellier	Palais des sports René-Bougnol; Sud de France Arena	3,000; 8,000	3rd place, bronze medalist(s)
Nantes	Nantes	Palais des Sports; Halle XXL de la Beaujoire	5,000; 9,000	2nd place, silver medalist(s)
USAM Nîmes	Nîmes	Le Parnasse	3,391	7th
Paris Saint-Germain	Paris	Stade Pierre de Coubertin; Halle Georges Carpentier	3,402; 4,300	1st place, gold medalist(s)
Saint Raphaël	Saint-Raphaël	Palais des sports J-F Krakowski	2,000	9th
Fenix Toulouse	Toulouse	Palais des Sports André Brouat	4,200	4th
Tremblay	Tremblay-en-France	Palais des sports	1,020	▲1st VAP (D2)

Squads of previous seasons

2020-21 Teams

Team	Location	Arena	Capacity	Rank 2019-20
Pays d'Aix Université Club	Aix-en-Provence	Complexe sportif du Val de l'Arc; Arena du Pays d'Aix	1,650; 6,004	6th
Cesson Rennes	Cesson-Sévigné	Glaz Arena	4,500	▲1st in D2
Chambéry	Chambéry	Le Phare	4,400	9th
Chartres Métropole	Chartres	Halle Jean-Cochet	1,200	10th
US Créteil	Créteil	Palais des Sports Robert Oubron	2,500	14th
Dunkerque	Dunkerque	Stade des Flandres	2,400	7th
Istres Provence Handball	Istres	Halle polyvalente	2,000	11th
US Ivry	Ivry-sur-Seine	Gymnase Auguste-Delaune	1,500	12th
Limoges Handball	Limoges	Palais des Sports de Beaublanc	5,516	▲2nd in D2
Montpellier	Montpellier	Palais des sports René-Bougnol; Sud de France Arena	3,000; 8,000	4th
Nantes	Nantes	Palais des Sports; Halle XXL de la Beaujoire	5,000; 9,000	2nd place, silver medalist(s)
USAM Nîmes	Nîmes	Le Parnasse	3,391	3rd place, bronze medalist(s)
Paris Saint-Germain	Paris	Stade Pierre de Coubertin; Halle Georges Carpentier	3,402; 4,300	1st place, gold medalist(s)
Saint Raphaël	Saint-Raphaël	Palais des sports J-F Krakowski	2,000	8th
Fenix Toulouse	Toulouse	Palais des Sports André Brouat	4,200	5th
Tremblay Handball	Tremblay-en-France	Palais des sports	1,020	13th

Results:

- US Ivry & Tremblay Handball
- ▲ Saran Loiret HB & Grand Nancy MHB

2021-22 Teams

Team	Location	Arena	Capacity	Rank 2020-21
Pays d'Aix Université Club	Aix-en-Provence	Complexe sportif du Val de l'Arc; Arena du Pays d'Aix	1,650; 6,004	4th
Cesson Rennes	Cesson-Sévigné	Glaz Arena	4,500	14th
Chambéry	Chambéry	Le Phare	4,400	7th
Chartres Métropole	Chartres	Halle Jean-Cochet	1,200	11th
US Créteil	Créteil	Palais des Sports Robert Oubron	2,500	12th
Dunkerque	Dunkerque	Stade des Flandres	2,400	10th
Istres Provence Handball	Istres	Halle polyvalente	2,000	13th
Limoges Handball	Limoges	Palais des Sports de Beaublanc	5,516	9th
Montpellier	Montpellier	Palais des sports René-Bougnol; Sud de France Arena	3,000; 8,000	2nd place, silver medalist(s)
Grand Nancy Métropole Handball	Nancy	Parc des sports de Vandœuvre Nations	1,150	▲2nd in D2
Nantes	Nantes	Palais des Sports; Halle XXL de la Beaujoire	5,000; 9,000	3rd place, bronze medalist(s)
USAM Nîmes	Nîmes	Le Parnasse	3,391	5th
Paris Saint-Germain	Paris	Stade Pierre de Coubertin; Halle Georges Carpentier	3,402; 4,300	1st place, gold medalist(s)
Saint Raphaël	Saint-Raphaël	Palais des sports J-F Krakowski	2,000	8th
Saran Loiret Handball	Saran	Halle Jacques Mazzuca	950	▲1st in D2
Fenix Toulouse	Toulouse	Palais des Sports André Brouat	4,200	6th

Results:

- Saran Loiret HB & Grand Nancy MHB
- ▲US Ivry & Sélestat Alsace HB

2022-23 Teams

Team	Location	Arena	Capacity	Rank 21-22
Pays d'Aix Université Club	Aix-en-Provence	Complexe sportif du Val de l'Arc; Arena du Pays d'Aix	1,650; 6,004	3rd place, bronze medalist(s)
Cesson Rennes	Cesson-Sévigné	Glaz Arena	4,500	9th
Chambéry	Chambéry	Le Phare	4,400	5th
Chartres Métropole	Chartres	Halle Jean-Cochet	1,200	10th
US Créteil	Créteil	Palais des Sports Robert Oubron	2,500	11th
Dunkerque	Dunkerque	Stade des Flandres	2,400	12th
Istres Provence Handball	Istres	Halle polyvalente	2,000	14th
US Ivry	Ivry-sur-Seine	Gymnase Auguste-Delaune	1,500	▲1st VAP (D2)
Limoges Handball	Limoges	Palais des Sports de Beaublanc	5,516	13th
Montpellier	Montpellier	Palais des sports René-Bougnol; Sud de France Arena	3,000; 8,000	4th
Nantes	Nantes	Palais des Sports; Halle XXL de la Beaujoire	5,000; 9,000	2nd place, silver medalist(s)
USAM Nîmes	Nîmes	Le Parnasse	3,391	6th
Paris Saint-Germain	Paris	Stade Pierre de Coubertin; Halle Georges Carpentier	3,402; 4,300	1st place, gold medalist(s)
Saint Raphaël	Saint-Raphaël	Palais des sports J-F Krakowski	2,000	8th
Sélestat Alsace Handball	Sélestat	CSI Sélestat	2,300	▲2nd VAP (D2)
Fenix Toulouse	Toulouse	Palais des Sports André Brouat	4,200	7th

Results:

- Sélestat Alsace HB & Istres Provence Handball
- ▲ Saran Loiret HB & Dijon Métropole Handball

2023-24 Teams

Team	Location	Arena	Capacity	Rank 22-23
Pays d'Aix Université Club	Aix-en-Provence	Complexe sportif du Val de l'Arc; Arena du Pays d'Aix	1,650; 6,004	11th
Cesson Rennes	Cesson-Sévigné	Glaz Arena	4,500	9th
Chambéry	Chambéry	Le Phare	4,400	4th
Chartres Métropole	Chartres	Halle Jean-Cochet	1,200	13th
US Créteil	Créteil	Palais des Sports Robert Oubron	2,500	14th
Dijon	Dijon	Palais des Sports de Dijon	5,000	▲2nd VAP (D2)
Dunkerque	Dunkerque	Stade des Flandres	2,400	8th
US Ivry	Ivry-sur-Seine	Gymnase Auguste-Delaune	1,500	12th
Limoges Handball	Limoges	Palais des Sports de Beaublanc	5,516	10th
Montpellier	Montpellier	Palais des sports René-Bougnol; Sud de France Arena	3,000; 8,000	2nd place, silver medalist(s)
Nantes	Nantes	Palais des Sports; Halle XXL de la Beaujoire	5,000; 9,000	3rd place, bronze medalist(s)
USAM Nîmes	Nîmes	Le Parnasse	3,391	5th
Paris Saint-Germain	Paris	Stade Pierre de Coubertin; Halle Georges Carpentier	3,402; 4,300	1st place, gold medalist(s)
Saint Raphaël	Saint-Raphaël	Palais des sports J-F Krakowski	2,000	7th
Saran Loiret Handball	Saran	Halle Jacques Mazzuca	950	▲1st VAP (D2)
Fenix Toulouse	Toulouse	Palais des Sports André Brouat	4,200	6th

Results:

- Dijon Métropole Handball & Saran Loiret HB
- ▲ Tremblay & Istres Provence Handball

== Winners ==
Season	Champion
1952–1953	Villemomble-Sports
1953–1954	ASPP Paris Handball
1954–1955	ASPP Paris Handball (2)
1955–1956	Paris UC
1956–1957	ASPOM Bordeaux
1957–1958	ASPOM Bordeaux (2)
1958–1959	Paris UC (2)
1959–1960	AS Mulhouse
1960–1961	Bataillon de Joinville
1961–1962	Paris UC (3)
1962–1963	US Ivry Handball
1963–1964	US Ivry Handball (2)
1964–1965	SMUC
1965–1966	US Ivry Handball (3)
1966–1967	SMUC (2)
1967–1968	Stella Saint-Maur
1968–1969	SMUC (3)
1969–1970	US Ivry Handball (4)
1970–1971	US Ivry Handball (5)
1971–1972	Stella Saint-Maur (2)
1972–1973	Cercle Sportif Laïc Dijon
1973–1974	Paris UC (4)
1974–1975	SMUC (4)
1975–1976	Stella Saint-Maur (3)
1976–1977	RC Strasbourg
1977–1978	Stella Saint-Maur (4)
1978–1979	Stella Saint-Maur (5)
1979–1980	Stella Saint-Maur (6)
1980–1981	USM Gagny
1981–1982	USM Gagny (2)
1982–1983	US Ivry Handball (6)
1983–1984	SMUC (5)

Season	Champion
1984–1985	USM Gagny (3)
1985–1986	USM Gagny (4)
1986–1987	USM Gagny (5)
1987–1988	USAM Nîmes
1988–1989	US Créteil
1989–1990	USAM Nîmes (2)
1990–1991	USAM Nîmes (3)
1991–1992	Vénissieux Handball
1992–1993	USAM Nîmes (4)
1993–1994	OM Vitrolles
1994–1995	Montpellier
1995–1996	OM Vitrolles (2)
1996–1997	US Ivry Handball (7)
1997–1998	Montpellier (2)
1998–1999	Montpellier (3)
1999–2000	Montpellier (4)
2000–2001	Chambéry Savoie Handball
2001–2002	Montpellier (5)
2002–2003	Montpellier (6)
2003–2004	Montpellier (7)
2004–2005	Montpellier (8)
2005–2006	Montpellier (9)
2006–2007	US Ivry Handball (8)
2007–2008	Montpellier (10)
2008–09	Montpellier (11)
2009–10	Montpellier (12)
2010–11	Montpellier (13)
2011–12	Montpellier (14)
2012–13	Paris Saint-Germain
2013–14	US Dunkerque
2014–15	Paris Saint-Germain (2)
2015–16	Paris Saint-Germain (3)

Season	Champion
2016–17	Paris Saint-Germain (4)
2017–18	Paris Saint-Germain (5)
2018–19	Paris Saint-Germain (6)
2019–20	Paris Saint-Germain (7)
2020–21	Paris Saint-Germain (8)
2021–22	Paris Saint-Germain (9)
2022–23	Paris Saint-Germain (10)
2023–24	Paris Saint-Germain (11)
2024–25	Paris Saint-Germain (12)
2025–26	Paris Saint-Germain (13)

=== Performance by club ===
Rank	Club	Titles	Winning seasons
1	Montpellier Handball	14	1995, 1998, 1999, 2000, 2002, 2003, 2004, 2005, 2006, 2008, 2009, 2010, 2011, 2012
2	Paris Saint-Germain	13	2013, 2015, 2016, 2017, 2018, 2019, 2020, 2021, 2022, 2023, 2024, 2025, 2026
3	Union sportive d'Ivry	8	1963, 1964, 1966, 1970, 1971, 1983, 1997, 2007
4	Stade Marseillais UC	7	1965, 1967, 1969, 1975, 1984, 1994, 1996
5	Stella Sports Saint-Maur	6	1968, 1972, 1976, 1978, 1979, 1980
6	USM Gagny	5	1981, 1982, 1985, 1986, 1987
7	Paris UC	4	1956, 1959, 1962, 1974
7	USAM Nîmes	4	1988, 1990, 1991, 1993
9	ASP Police Paris	2	1954, 1955
9	ASPOM Bordeaux	2	1957, 1958
11	Villemomble Sports	1	1953
11	AS Mulhouse	1	1960
11	Bataillon de Joinville	1	1961
11	Cercle Sportif Laïc Dijon	1	1973
11	Racing Club de Strasbourg	1	1977
11	Union sportive de Créteil	1	1989
11	Vénissieux HB 85	1	1992
11	Stade olympique de Chambéry	1	2001
11	Dunkerque HGL	1	2014
Total		73	1953–2025

== Statistics ==
=== EHF coefficients ===
The following data indicates French coefficient rankings between European handball leagues.

Country ranking

EHF League Ranking for 2022/23 season:

- 1. (1) (Germany) Handball-Bundesliga (145.00)
- 2. (3) (Spain) Liga ASOBAL (121.50)
- 3. (2) (France) LNH Division 1 (104.33)
- 4. (5) (Hungary) Nemzeti Bajnokság I (94.17)
- 5. (7) (Denmark) Håndboldligaen (87.33)

Club ranking

EHF Club Ranking as of 5 September 2025:

- 7. HBC Nantes (493)
- 9. Paris Saint-Germain (464)
- 10. Montpellier (446)
- 26. Fenix Toulouse (155)
- 36. Limoges (126)

== See also ==
- Other domestic competitions:
  - Coupe de France
  - Coupe de la Ligue
  - Trophée des Champions
- Handball in France:
  - LNH Division 2 (ProLigue), lower echelon of France handball
  - LFH Division 1 Féminine (Ligue Butagaz Énergie), the corresponding women's competition
  - LFH Division 2 Féminine (D2F)
  - List of handball clubs in France
