= Yuliya Snopova =

Ukrainian handball player (born 1985)

Personal information
- Full name: Yuliya Snopova
- Nationality: Ukrainian
- Born: 30 November 1985 (age 40) Kherson, Ukrainian SSR Soviet Union
- Height: 1.83 m (6 ft 0 in)

Sport
- Sport: Handball
- Position: Right Back
- Current club: Retired

Senior clubs
- Years: Team
- 2002–2007: HC Dnepryanka Kherson
- 2007–2009: SC Galytchanka Lviv
- 2009–2010: HC Smart
- 2010–2011: Le Havre ACH
- 2011–2012: Maliye Milli Piyango SK
- 2012–2013: IUVENTA Michalovce
- 2013–2014: S.C.M. Craiova
- 2014–2015: Thüringer HC
- 2015-2018: Muratpaşa Bld. SK
- 2018-2019: Kastamonu Bld. GSK
- 2019-2020: RK Krim
National team
- Years: Team
- –: Ukraine

Yuliya Snopova (born Ukrainian: Ю́лія Снопова; born 30 November 1985 in Kherson) is a Ukrainian former handballer who played as a right back for RK Krim and the Ukrainian national team.

== International honours ==
- EHF Cup:
  - Quarterfinalist: 2012
