= Marina Pantić =

Serbian handball player (born 1988)

Personal information
- Nationality: Serbian
- Born: 26 October 1988 (age 37) Šabac, SR Serbia, SFR Yugoslavia
- Height: 1.83 m (6 ft 0 in)

Sport
- Sport: Handball
- Position: Goalkeeper
- Current club: Le Havre
- Number: 21

Senior clubs
- Years: Team
- 2016–: Le Havre
National team
Years	Team	Apps	(Gls)
–	Serbia	10	(0)

Marina Pantić (born 26 October 1988) is a Serbian handball player who plays for Le Havre and the Serbia national team.
