= Dijon Métropole Handball =

French handball team

Dijon MH
- Full name: Dijon Métropole Handball
- Short name: DMH
- Founded: 1942; 84 years ago
- Arena: Palais des sports Jean-Michel-Geoffroy, Dijon
- Capacity: 5,000
- Head coach: Ulrich Chaduteaud
- League: LNH Division 1
- 2024-25: LNH Division 2, 1st (promoted)
- Club colours
Home	Away

Dijon Métropole Handball is a French handball team based in Dijon, that plays in the LNH Division 1.

Location of Dijon Métropole Handball

== History ==
The club was founded in November 1942. In 1970, the team reached the finals of the French championship, and in 1973 they became French champions. After that, he reached the final of the French championship three more times (1978, 1979 and 1981). In 1992, the team merged with ASPTT Dijon and from then on Dijon Bourgogne Handball was the name of the team. In 2017, the name of the club was changed to Dijon Métropole Handball.

In the 2023-24 season they were relegated, but they were promoted again just the season after.

== Crest, colours, supporters ==
=== Naming history ===
Name	Period
Cercle Sportif Laïc Dijonnais	1942–1992
Dijon Bourgogne Handball	1992–2017
Dijon Métropole Handball	2017–present

=== Kits ===
HOME
Select; 2020–21	2022–23	2023–24

AWAY
Select; 2020–21	2022–23	2023–24

== Sports Hall information ==
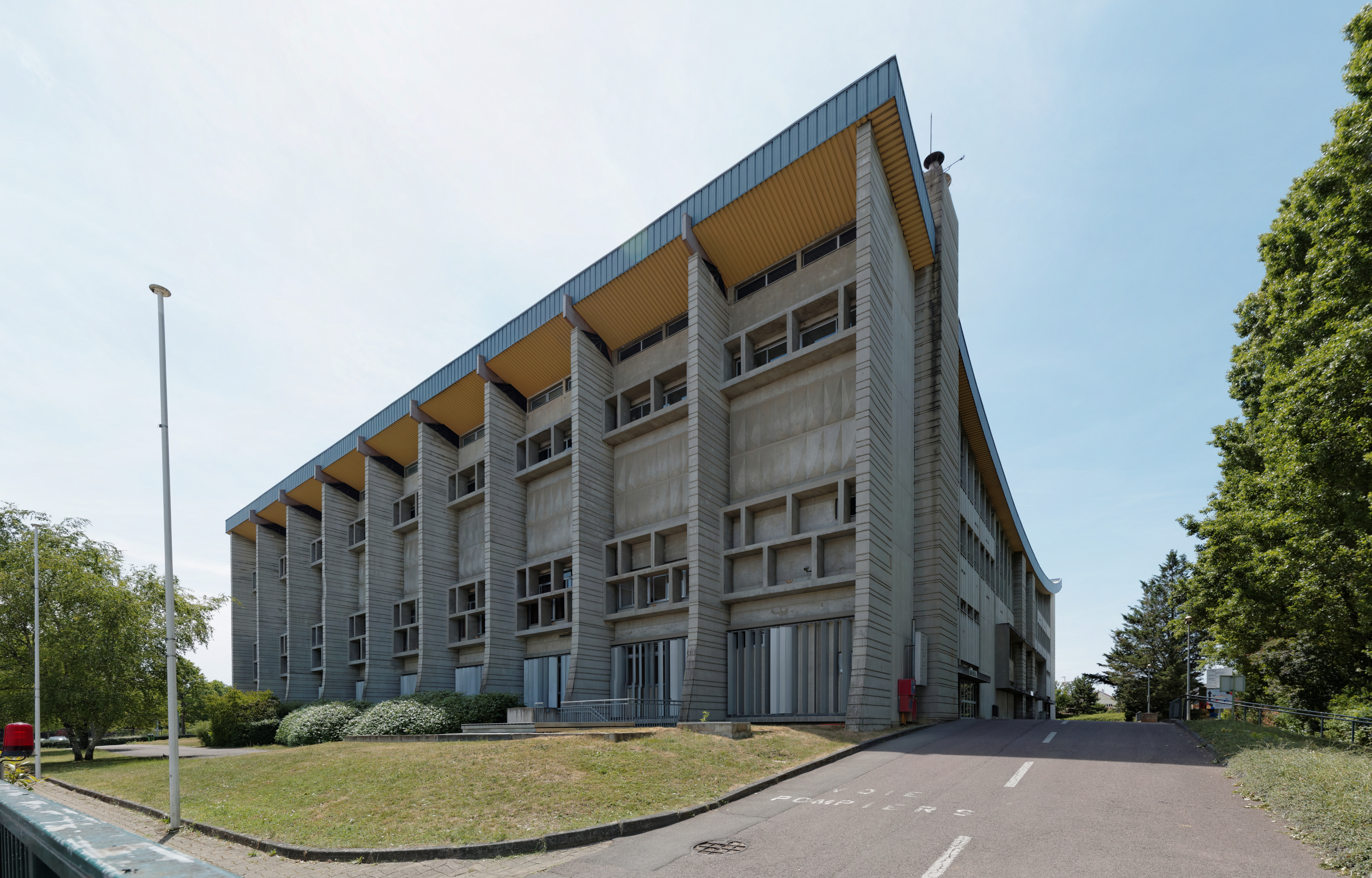
Home hall: Palais des sports Jean-Michel-Geoffroy

- Name: – Palais des sports Jean-Michel-Geoffroy
- City: – Dijon
- Capacity: – 5000
- Address: – 17 Rue Léon Mauris, 21000 Dijon, France

== Team ==
=== Current squad ===
Squad for the 2023–24 season

Dijon Métropole Handball

Goalkeepers

- 1 (Tunisia) Wassim Helal
- 24 (Portugal) Manuel Gaspar

Left Wingers

- 41 (France) Arthur Pecaud
- 95 (France) Loïs Pasquet

Right Wingers

- 10 (France) Yannis Mancelle
- 11 (France) Lucien Auffret
- 13 (France) Mathis Jaffiol
- 62 (France) Théo Laguillaumie

Line Players

- 8 (France) Marc Poletti (c)
- 68 (France) Edgar Dentz
- 77 (France) Axel Lanfranchi
- 94 (Algeria) Bastien Khermouche

Left Backs

- 3 (France) Pierrick Naudin
- 6 (France) Robin Paris
- 14 (Algeria) Messaoud Berkous

Central Backs

- 17 (France) Steeven Bois
- 98 (France) Jules Lignières

Right Backs

- 5 (Israel) Nevo Medina

=== Technical staff ===
- Head coach: (France) Ulrich Chaduteaud

=== Transfers ===
Transfers for the 2026–27 season

Joining

- (Portugal) Manuel Gaspar (GK) from (France) US Ivry Handball
- (Norway) Sindre Aho (CB) from (Germany) TSV Hannover-Burgdorf
- (France) James Edward Scott Junior (LB) from (Spain) Balonmano Torrelavega

Leaving

- (Romania) (Croatia) Ante Kuduz (LB) to (Greece) Olympiacos
- (Argentina) (Italy) Maximiliano Soliani (GK) to (France) Valence Drôme Handball
- (France) Ethan Toleon (LB) to (France) Valence Drôme Handball

=== Transfer History ===
Transfers for the 2025–26 season

Joining

- (Romania) (Croatia) Ante Kuduz (LB) from (Romania) Dinamo București
- (Montenegro) Miodrag Ćorsović (LP) from (Serbia) RK Partizan
- (Spain) Adrià León Morales (LP) from (France) Frontignan Thau HB
- (France) Rudy Seri (LB) from (France) Caen Handball

Leaving

- (Norway) André Pung Tuzov (LB) to (Romania) CSM București
- (France) Antoine Gros (LB) to (France) Grand Besançon Doubs Handball
- (France) Axel Lanfranchi (LP) to (France) ALC Longvic Handball

Transfers for the 2023–24 season

Joining

- (Portugal) Manuel Gaspar (GK) from (France) HBC Nantes
- (Algeria) Messaoud Berkous (LB) from (France) Istres Provence Handball
- (Israel) Nevo Medina (RB) from (Israel) Hapoel Kiryat Ono
- (France) Jules Lignières (CB) from (Spain) BM Benidorm
- (France) Yannis Mancelle (RW) from (France) Caen Handball
- (France) Edgar Dentz (LP) from (France) Istres Provence Handball

Leaving

- (Belgium) Quinten Colman (RB) to Tremblay-en-France
- (France) Alexis Bon (RB) to (France) Cavigal Nice handball
- (France) Maxime Diot (GK) to (France) Frontignan Handball

== Honours ==
- LNH Division 1
  - Winners (1): 1973
  - Runners-up (4): 1970, 1978, 1979, 1981
- LNH Division 2
  - Winners (1): 2023

== Former club members ==
=== Notable former players ===
- (France) Didier Dinart (1993–1997)
- (France) Frédéric Dole (1993–1995)
- (France) Cédric Paty (2000–2002)
- (Algeria) Aziz Benkahla (1997–1999)
- (Algeria) Messaoud Berkous (2023–)
- (Algeria) Bastien Khermouche (2020–)
- (Belgium) Quinten Colman (2021–2023)
- (Croatia) Goran Bogunović (2012–2013)
- (Croatia) Jakov Vranković (2013–2014)
- (Czech Republic) Jan Sobol (2017–2021)
- (Greenland) Angutimmarik Kreutzmann (2014)
- (Portugal) Manuel Gaspar (2023–)
- (Romania) (Croatia) Ante Kuduz (2015–2016)
- (Russia) Mikhail Revin (2013–2014)
- (Tunisia) Wassim Helal (2016–)

=== Former coaches ===
Seasons	Coach	Country
2006–2014	Denis Lathoud	(France)
2014	Elena Napăr-Gropoşilă	(Romania) (France)
2014–2015	Tomislav Križanović	(France)
2015–2018	Jackson Richardson	(France)
2018–	Ulrich Chaduteaud	(France)
