= Jasna Boljević =

Montenegrin handball player (born 1989)

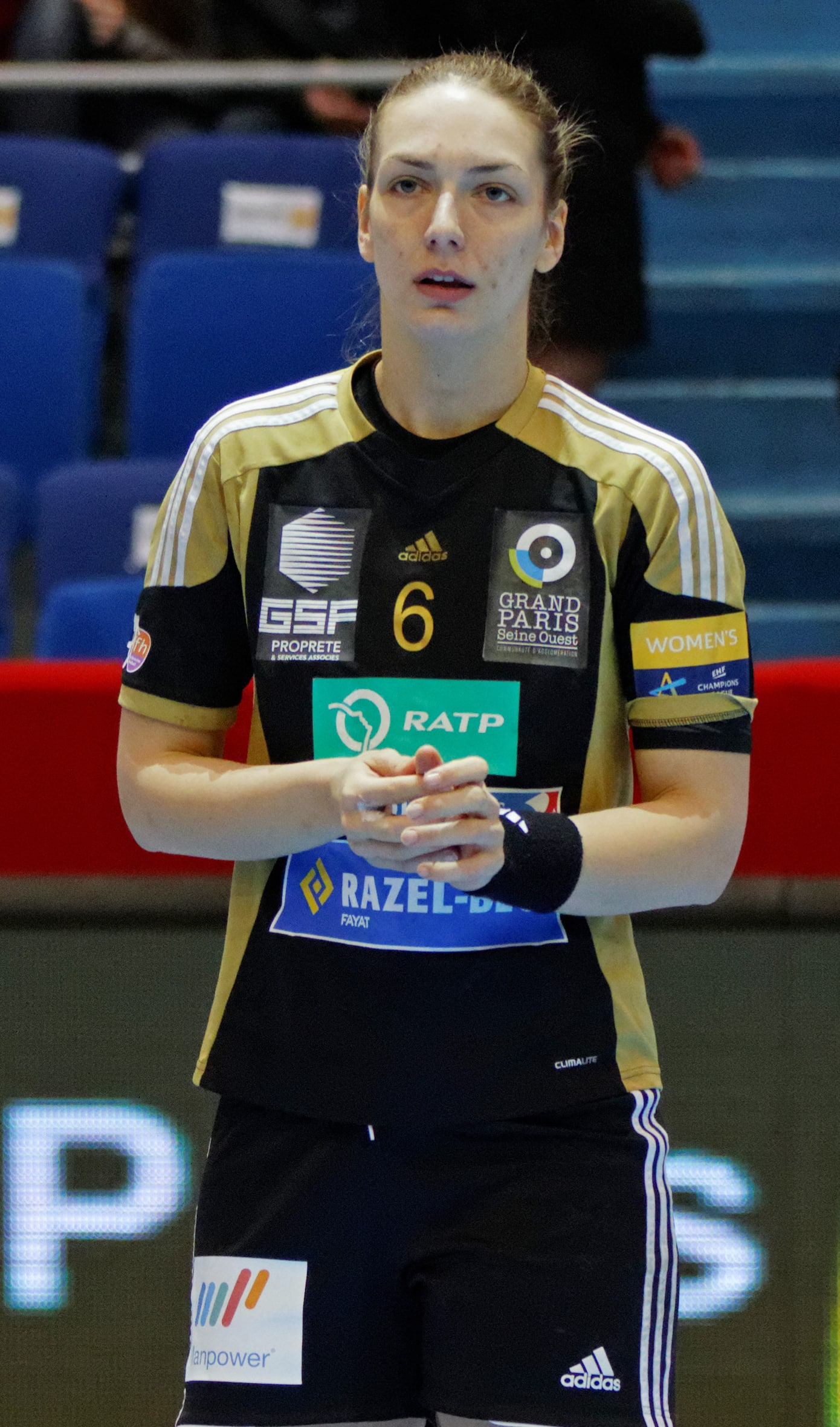

Personal information
- Nationality: Montenegrin
- Born: 16 March 1989 (age 37) Podgorica, SR Montenegro, SFR Yugoslavia
- Height: 1.90 m (6 ft 3 in)

Sport
- Sport: Handball
- Position: Right back
- Current club: Rapid București

Senior clubs
- Years: Team
- –2008: ŽRK Petrol Bonus Podgorica
- 2008–2011: HC Naisa Niš
- 2011–2012: Békéscsabai Előre NKSE
- 2012–2013: Issy-Paris Hand
- 2013–2014: HAC Handball
- 2014–2018: CSM Roman
- 2018–2019: Măgura Cisnădie
- 2019–: Rapid București
National team
Years	Team	Apps	(Gls)
–	Montenegro	24	(18)
Medal record
European Championship
Gold medal – first place	2012 Serbia
- Updated on 21 August 2022

Jasna Boljević (née Tošković; born 16 March 1989) is a Montenegrin female handballer who plays for Rapid București.

She was part of the Montenegrin team that won their first ever international title at the 2012 European Women's Handball Championship.

== International honours ==
- EHF Cup Winners' Cup:
  - Finalist: 2013
- European Championship:
  - Winner: 2012
