= Wassim Helal =

Tunisian handball player

Personal information
- Nationality: Tunisian
- Born: 16 July 1982 (age 44) Monastir, Tunisia
- Height: 1.93 m (6 ft 4 in)

Sport
- Sport: Handball
- Position: Goalkeeper
National team
- Years: Team
- –: Tunisia
Medal record
African Championship
Silver medal – second place	2020 Tunisia

Wassim Helal (born 16 July 1982) is a Tunisian handball goalkeeper. He competed for the Tunisian national team at the 2012 Summer Olympics in London, where the Tunisian team reached the quarter finals.
