= Stella Saint-Maur Handball =

French handball club

- Full name: Stella Saint-Maur Handball
- Short name: Les Stellistes
- Founded: 1946; 80 years ago
- Arena: Centre sportif Pierre-Brossolette
- Capacity: 1315
- President: Luc Sarramegna
- Head coach: Felix García Carracedo (SPA)
- League: Division 1
- 2024–25: 13th
- Club colours

The 1979-1980 men's team.

Stella Saint-Maur Handball is a French handball club from Saint-Maur-des-Fossés, Paris. It was founded in 1946 and the women's team plays in the Top French League. The men's team has won the French Championship 6 times, and the women's team has won the title a single time.

== Titles ==
=== Men's team ===
- French Championship:
  - Winner: 1968, 1972, 1976, 1978, 1979, 1980
  - Runners-up: 1963, 1969, 1971, 1974, 1985
- French Cup:
  - Winner: 1978

=== Women's team ===
- French Championship:
  - Winner: 1971
- French 2nd Division:
  - Winner: 2023
  - Runners-up: 2022
