= Mérignac Handball =

French handball club

- Full name: Mérignac Handball
- Founded: 1964
- Arena: Salle Pierre de Coubertin, Mérignac, Gironde
- Capacity: 500
- President: Wilhelmine Maury
- Head coach: Christophe Chagnard
- League: French Women's First League
- 2021–22: 10th

Location of Mérignac Handball

Mérignac Handball is the name of a French handball club from Mérignac, France. This team currently competes in the French Women's Handball First League from 2019 and they play their home matches in Salle Pierre de Coubertin.

== Team ==
=== Current squad ===
Squad for the 2023-24 season.

Goalkeepers

- 29 (France) Léna Le Borgne
- 16 (France) Keran Bekrou-Brega (CF)
- 23 (France) Shana Wanda (CF)
- 52 (France) Lisa Astier (CF)

LW

- 6 (France) Léa Lignières
- 8 (France) Louane Texier (CF)

RW

- 25 (France) Julie Abadie
- 35 (France) Albane Frachon (CF)
- 26 (France) Romane Lelong (CF)

Line players

- 24 (France) Noémie Lachaud
- 37 (France) Anna Lacuey
- 5 (France) Anouck Clément

Back players
LB

- 7 (France) Phellys Kibuey (CF)
- 13 (France) Assa Dabo Sissoko (CF)
- 17 (France) Mélissa Chantelly

CB

- 9 (France) Lylou Borg
- 18 (Belgium) Nele Antonissen
- 11 (France) Lou Sibon-Valero (CF)

RB

- 36 (France) Julie Dazet (C)
- 38 (France) Lina Colinot (CF)

=== Transfers ===
Transfers for the 2022-23 season

Joining

- (France) Noémie Lachaud (LP) (from (France) OGC Nice Côte d'Azur Handball)
- (France) Anouck Clément (LP) (from (France) Jeanne d'Arc Dijon Handball)
- (Denmark) Sofia Deen (LB) (from (France) Bourg-de-Péage Drôme Handball)

Leaving

- (France) Emma Puleri (LP) (to (France) Saint-Amand Handball)
