= Jan Bašný =

Czech handball coach

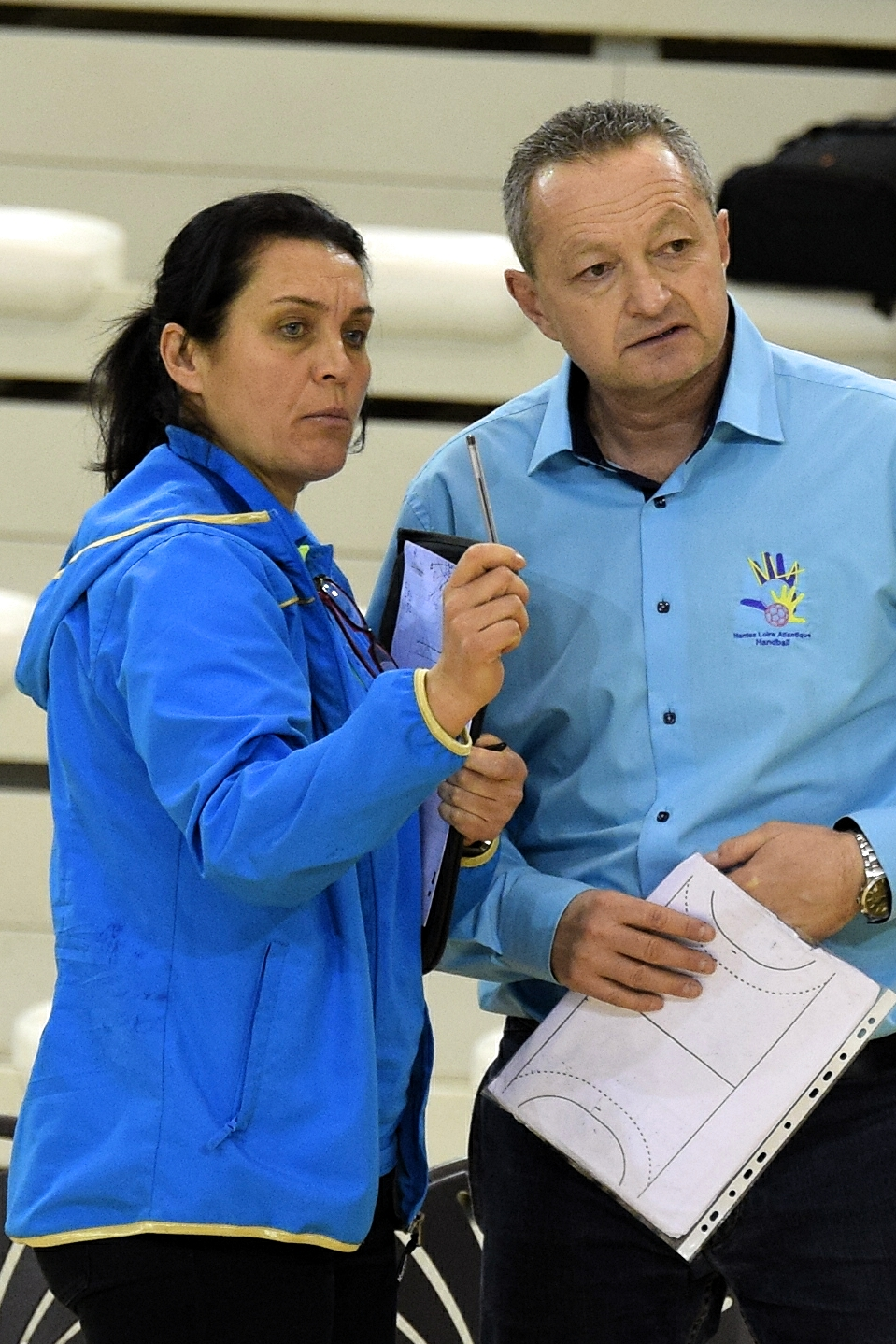

Personal information
- Nationality: Czech
- Born: 29 January 1963 (age 63) Brno, Czechoslovakia

Sport
- Sport: Handball
- Current club: Achenheim Truchtersheim HB (manager)

Senior clubs
- Years: Team
- 1982-1990: Slavia Prague
- 1990-2000: GFC Ajaccio
National team
Years	Team	Apps
–	Czech Republic	14

Teams managed
- 2000-2004: GFC Ajaccio
- 2004-2006: Istres Provence Handball
- 2007-2009: ES Besançon
- 2009-2014: GFC Ajaccio
- 2010-2022: Czech Republic (W)
- 2014-2018: Nantes Loire Atlantique Handball
- 2018-2020: GFC Ajaccio
- 2021-: Achenheim Truchtersheim HB

Jan Bašný (born 29 January 1963) is a Czech handball coach, who currently coaches the French club Achenheim Truchtersheim HB. From 2010 to 2022 he was the head coach for the Czech women's national team.
