= Bourg-de-Péage Drôme Handball =

French handball club

- Full name: Bourg-de-Péage Drôme Handball
- Founded: 1964
- Dissolved: December 12, 2022; 3 years ago
- Arena: Complexe Vercors, Bourg-de-Péage
- Capacity: 1,200
- League: French Women's First League

Bourg-de-Péage Drôme Handball was a former French handball club from Bourg-de-Péage, France. The team competed in the French Women's Handball First League from 2017 and played their home matches in Complexe Vercors. The team dissolved in December 2022.

== Notable former players ==
- (France) Amandine Leynaud
- (France) Maud-Éva Copy
- (Brazil) Deonise Cavaleiro
- (Norway) Anette Helene Hansen
- (Sweden) Cassandra Tollbring
- (Iceland) Hrafnhildur Hanna Þrastardóttir
- (Spain) Marta Mangué
