= Nemanja Ilić =

Serbian handball player (born 1990)

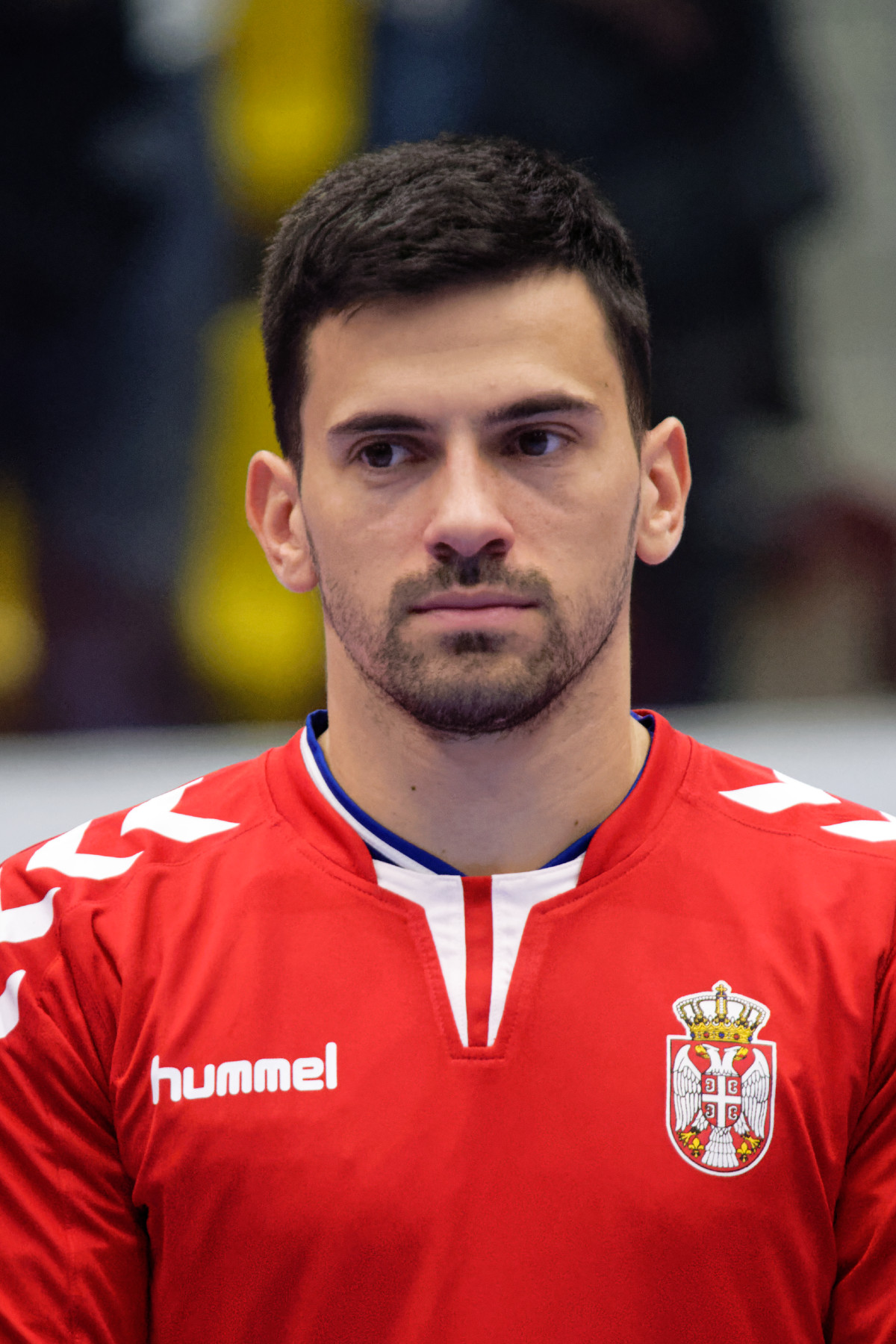
- Ilić in 2017

Personal information
- Full name: Nemanja Ilić
- Nationality: Serbian
- Born: 11 May 1990 (age 36) Belgrade, SR Serbia, SFR Yugoslavia
- Height: 1.78 m (5 ft 10 in)

Sport
- Sport: Handball
- Position: Left wing
- Current club: Fenix Toulouse
- Number: 19

Youth career
- Years: Team
- –: Partizan

Senior clubs
- Years: Team
- 2008–2013: Partizan
- 2008–2010: → Radnički Kragujevac
- 2013–present: Fenix Toulouse
- 2019: → FC Barcelona
National team
Years	Team	Apps	(Gls)
2012–2026	Serbia	137	(374)

Nemanja Ilić (Serbian Cyrillic: Немања Илић; born 11 May 1990) is a Serbian handball player and the team captain for Fenix Toulouse. He also represented the Serbia national team.

== Club career ==
After coming through the youth categories of Partizan, Ilić spent two seasons on loan with Radnički Kragujevac. He returned to his parent club in 2010 and helped the team win two consecutive national championships (2011 and 2012). In 2013, Ilić moved abroad and signed with French side Fenix Toulouse. He was loaned to Barcelona in early 2019, replacing the injured Casper Ulrich Mortensen until the end of the season.

== International career ==
A Serbia international since 2012, Ilić participated in three World Championships (2013, 2019 and 2023) and five European Championships (2014, 2018, 2020, 2022 and 2024).

== Personal life ==
Ilić is the older brother of fellow handball player Vanja Ilić.

== Honours ==
Partizan

- Serbian Handball Super League: 2010–11, 2011–12
- Serbian Handball Cup: 2011–12, 2012–13
- Serbian Handball Super Cup: 2011, 2012

Barcelona

- Liga ASOBAL: 2018–19
