= LNH Division 2 =

- Current season, competition or edition: 2025–26 LNH Division 2
- Sport: Handball
- Founded: 1952 (as Nationale 2)
- No. of teams: 16
- Country: France
- Most recent champion: Sélestat Alsace Handball
- Level on pyramid: Level 2
- Promotion to: Starligue
- Relegation to: National 1
- Official website: http://www.lnh.fr/

LNH Division 2, doing business as Proligue, is a professional handball league, and the second level of the French men's handball pyramid. It is organized by the Ligue Nationale de Handball, under delegation from the French Handball Federation. Founded in 1952, it is currently contested by 14 teams.
It was administered by the French federation until 2016, when the LNH took over and rebranded it as Proligue to match the name of its top tier, the Starligue.

== Current season ==
=== 2022–23 Teams ===
Locations of the 2022–23 LNH Division 2

Team	Location	Arena	Capacity	Rank 21-22
Grand Besançon DHB	Besançon	Palais des sports Ghani-Yalouz	3,280	12th
Billère Handball	Billère	Sporting d'Este	1,500	9th
Bordeaux Bruges Lormont	Bruges	Salle Jean Gaudet	500	▲1st VAP (D3)
Caen Handball	Caen	Palais des sports de Caen	2,950	10th
JS Cherbourg	Cherbourg	Complexe sportif de Chantereyne	2,600	2nd
Dijon Métropole HB	Dijon	Palais des sports Jean-Michel-Geoffroy	2,000	6th
Frontignan Handball	Frontignan	Salle Henri Ferrari	500	▲2nd VAP (D3)
Massy Essonne Handball	Massy	Centre Pierre-de-Coubertin	800	8th
Nancy Handball	Nancy	Parc des sports de Vandœuvre Nations	1,150	16th (D1)
Pontault-Combault Handball	Pontault-Combault	Espace Roger Boisramé	1,300	3rd
Saran Loiret Handball	Saran	Halle Jacques Mazzuca	950	15th (D1)
Sarrebourg Moselle-Sud HB	Sarrebourg	Centre sportif Pierre-de-Coubertin	1,000	11th
Strasbourg Eurométropole HB	Strasbourg	Gymnase des Malteries	1,200	13th
Tremblay Handball	Tremblay-en-France	Palais des sports de Tremblay	1,020	7th
Valence Handball	Valence	Palais des sports Pierre-Mendès-France	1,500	15th
Villeurbanne HBA	Villeurbanne	Salle des Gratte-Ciel	2,000	14th

== See also ==
- Coupe de France
- LNH Division 1 (Liqui Moly Starligue), upper echelon of French men's handball
- LFH Division 1 Féminine (Ligue Butagaz Énergie)
- LFH Division 2 Féminine (D2F), the corresponding women's competition
- List of handball clubs in France
