= Saran, Loiret =

Saran
- Commune
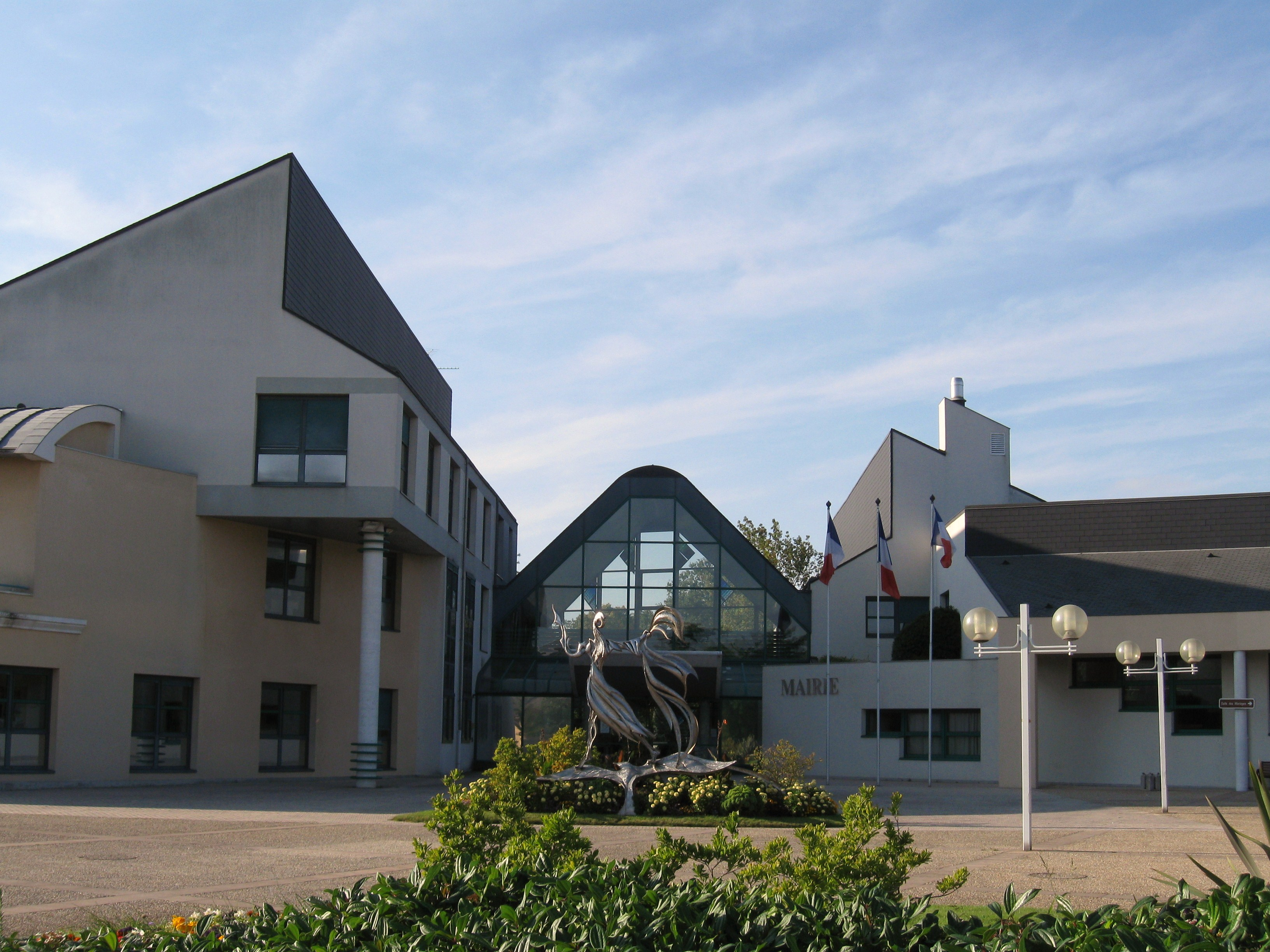
- The town hall in Saran
- Location of Saran
- Location within France Location within Centre-Val de Loire
- Coordinates: 47°57′05″N 1°52′29″E
- Country: France
- Region: Centre-Val de Loire
- Department: Loiret
- Arrondissement: Orléans
- Canton: Orléans-3
- Intercommunality: Orléans Métropole

Government
  - Mayor (2024–2026): Mathieu Gallois
- Area^{1}: 19.65 km^{2} (7.59 sq mi)
- Highest elevation: 137 m (449 ft)
- Lowest elevation: 108 m (354 ft)
- Population (2023): 17,316
  - Density: 881.2/km^{2} (2,282/sq mi)
- Demonym: Saranais
- Time zone: UTC+01:00 (CET)
  - Summer (DST): UTC+02:00 (CEST)
- INSEE/Postal code: 45302 /45770
- Website: www.ville-saran.fr
- ^{1} French Land Register data, which excludes lakes, ponds, glaciers > 1 km^{2} (0.386 sq mi or 247 acres) and river estuaries.

Saran (French pronunciation: [saʁɑ̃]) is a commune located in the northern suburbs of Orléans, in the Loiret department in the region Centre-Val de Loire.

Subject to a modified oceanic climate, the municipality has no recorded permanent watercourses.

Saran is an urban municipality with a population of 17316, having experienced significant population growth since 1962. It is part of the Orléans urban area and the Orléans catchment area.

The remains of the Aérotrain track, an experimental 18 km elevated structure with an inverted-T profile, built in 1969 by engineer Jean Bertin, was designated as "Outstanding Contemporary Architecture" in 2015.

Saran has, considering its size, many sports facilities including two stadiums, indoor and outdoor tennis courts, one swimming pool and four gymnasiums.

== History ==
Remains of a pottery workshop dating from the Middle Ages have been discovered in the area. Evidence of earlier occupation (from the Iron Age and the Hallstatt period through to the Early Middle Ages) has also been found during excavations at the "ZAC des Vergers" site.

== Sports ==
The handball club Saran Loiret Handball has played several seasons in the LNH Division 1.

== Population ==
Historical population
Year	Pop.	±% p.a.
1968	5,749	—
1975	8,757	+6.20%
1982	10,104	+2.07%
1990	13,436	+3.63%
1999	14,797	+1.08%
2007	15,333	+0.45%
2012	15,298	−0.05%
2017	16,365	+1.36%
2023	17,316	+0.95%
Source: INSEE

== See also ==
- Communes of the Loiret department
