= Le Havre AC (handball) =

Women's handball club in France

- Full name: Le Havre AC Handball
- Short name: Le Havre
- Founded: 1990
- Arena: Docks Océnae, Le Havre
- Capacity: 2,900
- President: Oumou Niang Fouguet; Guillaume Milert
- Head coach: Stéphane Pellan
- League: Ligue Butagaz Énergie
- 2025-2026: 12th
- Club colours
Home	Away

Le Havre AC Handball is a French women's handball club from Le Havre representing Le Havre AC in the French Division 1. The handball department was founded in 1989 by Christian Petit, Denis Coquin and Robert Frécon.

Le Havre has won two national cups in 2006 and 2007, and it has been the championship's runner-up between 2006 and 2010. Its best result in international competitions so far was reaching the 2010 EHF Cup's semifinals.

== Titles ==
- French Cup
  - 2006, 2007
- LFH Division 2
  - 2002, 2025

== Team ==
=== Current squad ===
Squad for the 2025-27 season.

Goalkeepers

- 30 (France) Lorraine Boudekhane
- 33 (France) Marie Heranval

Wingers
RW

- 7 (France) Lisa Le Merrer
- 2 (France) Lola Ribeiro

LW

- 29 (France) Zélie Le Gardien
- 21 (France) Mathita Diawara

Line players

- 77 (France) Leonore Boly
- 9 (France) Laura Dorp
- 82 (France) Clémence Nkindanda

Back players
LB

- 17 (France) Valentine Pin

CB

- 99 (France) Leslie Ayong
- 27 (France) Juliette Guerrier
- 76 (France) Alice Piqueras
- 34 (France) Lucile Roche

RB

- 10 (Brazil) Karolain Lewandowski
- 15 (Italy) Vanessa Djiogap
