= Palais des Sports de Beaulieu =

Sports center in Nantes, France

Coordinates: 47°12′34″N 1°32′12″W

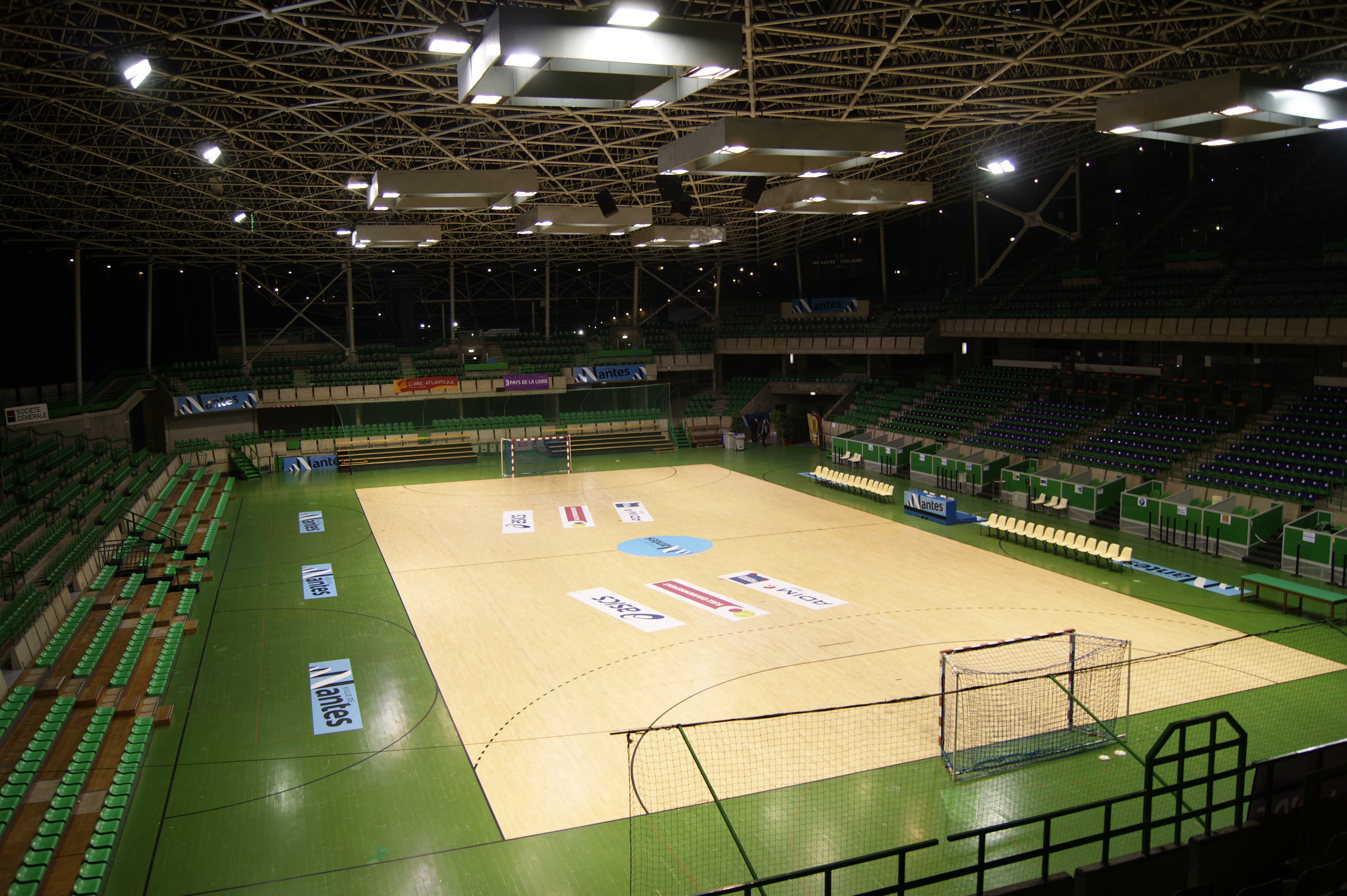
Palais des Sports de Beaulieu in 2011

Palais des Sports de Beaulieu is an indoor sporting arena located in Nantes, France. Built in 1973, the seating capacity of the arena is for 5,500 people. It is currently home to the HBC Nantes handball team. The arena hosted the 1974 European champions cup final in basketball in which Real Madrid defeated Ignis Varese 84–82, the 1983 European basketball championship finals and the 1992 European Cup final in which Real Madrid defeated P.A.O.K. Thessaloniki.

Preceded by Country Hall du Sart Tilman; Liège	FIBA European Champions Cup; Final venue 1974	Succeeded by Sporthal Arena; Antwerp
Preceded by Sportovní hala Prague	FIBA EuroBasket; Final venue 1983	Succeeded by Schleyerhalle; Stuttgart
Preceded by Patinoire des Vernets; Geneva	FIBA European Cup; Final venue 1992	Succeeded by PalaRuffini; Turin
