= 2020–21 Women's EHF European League group stage =

Competitive handball event

This article describes the group stage of the 2020–21 Women's EHF European League, a women's handball competition.

== Draw ==
The draw of the Women's EHF European League group stage took place on Thursday, 26 November 2020. The 16 teams allocated into four pots were drawn into four groups of four teams.

=== Seedings ===
The seedings were announced on 23 November 2020:

Pot 1	Pot 2	Pot 3	Pot 4
(Denmark) Herning-Ikast Håndbold (Hungary) Siófok KC (Romania) CS Minaur Baia Mare (Russia) HC Lada	(Hungary) Váci NKSE (Romania) HC Dunărea Brăila (Russia) Astrakhanochka (Turkey) Kastamonu Bld. GSK	(France) Nantes Atlantique HB (Norway) Storhamar Håndball Elite (Russia) HC Zvezda (Russia) Kuban	(France) Fleury Loiret (France) Paris 92 (Germany) Thüringer HC (Poland) MKS Perła Lublin

== Format ==
In each group, teams played against each other in a double round-robin format, with home and away matches. After completion of the group stage matches, the top two teams advanced to the Quarter-finals. Teams are not able to face opponents from the same country in the group.

== Tiebreakers ==
In the group stage, teams were ranked according to points (2 points for a win, 1 point for a draw, 0 points for a loss). After completion of the group stage, if two or more teams had scored the same number of points, the ranking will be determined as follows:

1. Highest number of points in matches between the teams directly involved;
2. Superior goal difference in matches between the teams directly involved;
3. Highest number of goals scored in matches between the teams directly involved (or in the away match in case of a two-team tie);
4. Superior goal difference in all matches of the group;
5. Highest number of plus goals in all matches of the group;

If the ranking of one of these teams is determined, the above criteria are consecutively followed until the ranking of all teams is determined. If no ranking can be determined, a decision shall be obtained by EHF through drawing of lots.

== Groups ==
The matchdays were 9–10 January, 16–17 January, 23–24 January, 6–7 February, 13–14 February and 20–21 February 2021.

=== Group A ===
Pos	Team	Pld	W	D	L	GF	GA	GD	Pts	Qualification
1	(Denmark) Herning-Ikast Håndbold	6	5	0	1	198	160	+38	10	Quarterfinals
2	(Russia) HC Zvezda	6	3	0	3	135	135	0	6 (Note: HC Zvezda 10–10 Paris 92, HC Zvezda advanced on superior goal difference.)	Quarterfinals
3	(France) Paris 92	6	3	0	3	93	101	−8	6	
4	(Hungary) Váci NKSE	6	1	0	5	150	180	−30	2	

Source: EHF
Notes:

9 January 2021; 13:30	Herning-Ikast Håndbold (Denmark)	34–25	(Russia) HC Zvezda	IBF Arena, Ikast; Attendance: 0 (Note: The match was played behind closed doors due to the COVID-19 pandemic.); Referees: Hannes, Hannes (GER)
9 January 2021; 13:30	Kristensen 12	(15–13)	Murzalieva 6	IBF Arena, Ikast; Attendance: 0 Referees: Hannes, Hannes (GER)
9 January 2021; 13:30	1× (yellow card) 4× (suspension)	Report	5× (suspension)	IBF Arena, Ikast; Attendance: 0 Referees: Hannes, Hannes (GER)

10 January 2021; 14:00	Váci NKSE (Hungary)	33–34	(France) Paris 92	Vác Sports Hall, Vác; Attendance: 0 Referees: Lončar, Lončar (CRO)
10 January 2021; 14:00	Helembai 10	(15–16)	Offendal 11	Vác Sports Hall, Vác; Attendance: 0 Referees: Lončar, Lončar (CRO)
10 January 2021; 14:00	2× (yellow card) 4× (suspension)	Report	2× (yellow card) 4× (suspension)	Vác Sports Hall, Vác; Attendance: 0 Referees: Lončar, Lončar (CRO)

16 January 2021; 14:00	HC Zvezda (Russia)	29–33	(Hungary) Váci NKSE	Olimpiysky Sport Palace, Chekhov; Attendance: 0 Referees: Kaludjerović, Vujačić (MNE)
16 January 2021; 14:00	three players 5	(12–17)	Diószegi 9	Olimpiysky Sport Palace, Chekhov; Attendance: 0 Referees: Kaludjerović, Vujačić (MNE)
16 January 2021; 14:00	3× (yellow card) 5× (suspension) 1× (red card)	Report	1× (yellow card) 8× (suspension)	Olimpiysky Sport Palace, Chekhov; Attendance: 0 Referees: Kaludjerović, Vujačić (MNE)

16 January 2021; 18:00	Paris 92 (France)	26–23	(Denmark) Herning-Ikast Håndbold	Palais des Sports Robert-Charpentier, Paris; Attendance: 0 Referees: Di Domenico, Fornasier (ITA)
16 January 2021; 18:00	Offendal 7	(14–12)	Bakkerud 5	Palais des Sports Robert-Charpentier, Paris; Attendance: 0 Referees: Di Domenico, Fornasier (ITA)
16 January 2021; 18:00	1× (yellow card) 2× (suspension)	Report	3× (suspension)	Palais des Sports Robert-Charpentier, Paris; Attendance: 0 Referees: Di Domenico, Fornasier (ITA)

23 January 2021; 16:00	Váci NKSE (Hungary)	26–38	(Denmark) Herning-Ikast Håndbold	Vác Sports Hall, Vác; Attendance: 0 Referees: Ciulei, Stoia (ROU)
23 January 2021; 16:00	Lakatos 8	(13–21)	Friis 7	Vác Sports Hall, Vác; Attendance: 0 Referees: Ciulei, Stoia (ROU)
23 January 2021; 16:00	1× (yellow card) 2× (suspension)	Report	3× (yellow card) 3× (suspension)	Vác Sports Hall, Vác; Attendance: 0 Referees: Ciulei, Stoia (ROU)

6 February 2021; 13:00	Herning-Ikast Håndbold (Denmark)	39–29	(Hungary) Váci NKSE	IBF Arena, Ikast; Attendance: 0 Referees: Jaskins, Zabko (LAT)
6 February 2021; 13:00	Fauske 12	(19–13)	Szabó 9	IBF Arena, Ikast; Attendance: 0 Referees: Jaskins, Zabko (LAT)
6 February 2021; 13:00	2× (yellow card) 2× (suspension)	Report	2× (yellow card) 4× (suspension)	IBF Arena, Ikast; Attendance: 0 Referees: Jaskins, Zabko (LAT)

14 February 2021; 12:00	HC Zvezda (Russia)	31–39	(Denmark) Herning-Ikast Håndbold	Olimpiysky Sport Palace, Chekhov; Attendance: 200; Referees: Metalari, Nikolovski (MKD)
14 February 2021; 12:00	Nikitina, Nikolaeva 7	(13–18)	Skogrand 7	Olimpiysky Sport Palace, Chekhov; Attendance: 200; Referees: Metalari, Nikolovski (MKD)
14 February 2021; 12:00	1× (yellow card) 2× (suspension)	Report	1× (yellow card) 4× (suspension)	Olimpiysky Sport Palace, Chekhov; Attendance: 200; Referees: Metalari, Nikolovski (MKD)

20 February 2021; 18:00	Váci NKSE (Hungary)	29–30	(Russia) HC Zvezda	Vác Sports Hall, Vác; Attendance: 0 Referees: Rauchs, Linster (LUX)
20 February 2021; 18:00	three players 5	(15–17)	Nikitina 9	Vác Sports Hall, Vác; Attendance: 0 Referees: Rauchs, Linster (LUX)
20 February 2021; 18:00	2× (yellow card) 4× (suspension)	Report	1× (yellow card) 3× (suspension)	Vác Sports Hall, Vác; Attendance: 0 Referees: Rauchs, Linster (LUX)

21 February 2021; 14:00	Herning-Ikast Håndbold (Denmark)	25–23	(France) Paris 92	IBF Arena, Ikast; Attendance: 0 Referees: Kijauskaite, Zaliene (LTU)
21 February 2021; 14:00	Møller 5	(13–12)	Offendal 9	IBF Arena, Ikast; Attendance: 0 Referees: Kijauskaite, Zaliene (LTU)
21 February 2021; 14:00	1× (yellow card) 4× (suspension)	Report	2× (yellow card) 6× (suspension)	IBF Arena, Ikast; Attendance: 0 Referees: Kijauskaite, Zaliene (LTU)

Cancelled (Note: The match, originally scheduled for 24 January 2021, first was postponed after restrictions of the government in France and later got cancelled.)	Paris 92 (France)	0–10 (Note: The matches could not be played and were assessed by the EHF.)	(Russia) HC Zvezda

Cancelled (Note: The match, originally scheduled for 7 February 2021, first was postponed after restrictions of the French government and later got cancelled.)	HC Zvezda (Russia)	10–0	(France) Paris 92

Cancelled (Note: The match, originally scheduled for 14 February 2021, could not be played.)	Paris 92 (France)	10–0	(Hungary) Váci NKSE

=== Group B ===
Pos	Team	Pld	W	D	L	GF	GA	GD	Pts	Qualification
1	(France) Nantes Atlantique	6	4	0	2	120	115	+5	8	Quarterfinals
2	(Russia) HC Lada	6	3	0	3	117	115	+2	6	Quarterfinals
3	(Poland) MKS Perla Lublin	6	2	1	3	130	125	+5	5 (Note: MKS Perla Lublin 55–46 Kastamonu Bld. GSK)	
4	(Turkey) Kastamonu Bld. GSK	6	2	1	3	130	142	−12	5	

Source: EHF
Notes:

9 January 2021; 16:00	Kastamonu Bld. GSK (Turkey)	20–20	(Poland) MKS Perła Lublin	Kastamonu Atatürk Sport Hall, Kastamonu; Attendance: 55; Referees: Duplii, Pobedrina (UKR)
9 January 2021; 16:00	Kurtović, Zulić 5	(10–9)	Gęga 6	Kastamonu Atatürk Sport Hall, Kastamonu; Attendance: 55; Referees: Duplii, Pobedrina (UKR)
9 January 2021; 16:00	1× (yellow card) 2× (suspension)	Report	3× (yellow card) 8× (suspension)	Kastamonu Atatürk Sport Hall, Kastamonu; Attendance: 55; Referees: Duplii, Pobedrina (UKR)

9 January 2021; 16:00	HC Lada (Russia)	32–29	(France) Nantes Atlantique	Olymp Sportlomplex, Togliatti; Attendance: 500; Referees: Kulik, Nabokau (BLR)
9 January 2021; 16:00	Shamanouskaya 7	(14–14)	de Paula 9	Olymp Sportlomplex, Togliatti; Attendance: 500; Referees: Kulik, Nabokau (BLR)
9 January 2021; 16:00	1× (yellow card) 4× (suspension)	Report	1× (yellow card) 2× (suspension)	Olymp Sportlomplex, Togliatti; Attendance: 500; Referees: Kulik, Nabokau (BLR)

16 January 2021; 16:00	Nantes Atlantique (France)	35–26	(Turkey) Kastamonu Bld. GSK	Complexe sportif Mangin-Beaulieu, Nantes; Attendance: 0 Referees: Rosendo, Rodriguez (ESP)
16 January 2021; 16:00	Grigel 7	(18–10)	Kurtović 9	Complexe sportif Mangin-Beaulieu, Nantes; Attendance: 0 Referees: Rosendo, Rodriguez (ESP)
16 January 2021; 16:00	2× (suspension)	Report	3× (suspension)	Complexe sportif Mangin-Beaulieu, Nantes; Attendance: 0 Referees: Rosendo, Rodriguez (ESP)

17 January 2021; 16:00	MKS Perła Lublin (Poland)	28–23	(Russia) HC Lada	Globus Hall, Lublin; Attendance: 0 Referees: Zaliene, Kijauskaite (LTU)
17 January 2021; 16:00	Nosek 5	(16–10)	Nikitina 7	Globus Hall, Lublin; Attendance: 0 Referees: Zaliene, Kijauskaite (LTU)
17 January 2021; 16:00	7× (suspension)	Report	1× (yellow card) 5× (suspension)	Globus Hall, Lublin; Attendance: 0 Referees: Zaliene, Kijauskaite (LTU)

23 January 2021; 16:00	MKS Perła Lublin (Poland)	26–31	(France) Nantes Atlantique	Globus Hall, Lublin; Attendance: 0 Referees: Xhema, Jahja (KOS)
23 January 2021; 16:00	Gęga 8	(12–15)	de Paula 8	Globus Hall, Lublin; Attendance: 0 Referees: Xhema, Jahja (KOS)
23 January 2021; 16:00	1× (yellow card) 2× (suspension)	Report	1× (yellow card) 2× (suspension)	Globus Hall, Lublin; Attendance: 0 Referees: Xhema, Jahja (KOS)

24 January 2021; 14:00	Kastamonu Bld. GSK (Turkey)	29–25	(Russia) HC Lada	Kastamonu Atatürk Sport Hall, Kastamonu; Attendance: 100; Referees: Manea, Iliescu (ROU)
24 January 2021; 14:00	Kurtović 10	(13–14)	Kirdiasheva 9	Kastamonu Atatürk Sport Hall, Kastamonu; Attendance: 100; Referees: Manea, Iliescu (ROU)
24 January 2021; 14:00	2× (suspension)	Report	1× (yellow card) 6× (suspension)	Kastamonu Atatürk Sport Hall, Kastamonu; Attendance: 100; Referees: Manea, Iliescu (ROU)

7 February 2021; 13:30	HC Lada (Russia)	27–29	(Turkey) Kastamonu Bld. GSK	Olymp Sportlomplex, Togliatti; Attendance: 496; Referees: Kaludjerović, Vujačić (MNE)
7 February 2021; 13:30	Nikitina 7	(13–14)	Kurtović 7	Olymp Sportlomplex, Togliatti; Attendance: 496; Referees: Kaludjerović, Vujačić (MNE)
7 February 2021; 13:30	1× (yellow card) 7× (suspension)	Report	1× (yellow card) 1× (suspension)	Olymp Sportlomplex, Togliatti; Attendance: 496; Referees: Kaludjerović, Vujačić (MNE)

7 February 2021; 16:00	Nantes Atlantique (France)	25–21	(Poland) MKS Perła Lublin	Complexe sportif Mangin-Beaulieu, Nantes; Attendance: 0 Referees: Garaets, Garaets (NED)
7 February 2021; 16:00	Grigel 7	(11–12)	Nocuń 6	Complexe sportif Mangin-Beaulieu, Nantes; Attendance: 0 Referees: Garaets, Garaets (NED)
7 February 2021; 16:00	3× (suspension)	Report	1× (yellow card) 2× (suspension)	Complexe sportif Mangin-Beaulieu, Nantes; Attendance: 0 Referees: Garaets, Garaets (NED)

15 February 2021; 18:00	MKS Perła Lublin (Poland)	35–26	(Turkey) Kastamonu Bld. GSK	Globus Hall, Lublin; Attendance: 0 Referees: Loshak, Shajbakov (UKR)
15 February 2021; 18:00	Gęga 7	(18–9)	Kurtović 7	Globus Hall, Lublin; Attendance: 0 Referees: Loshak, Shajbakov (UKR)
15 February 2021; 18:00	2× (yellow card) 6× (suspension)	Report	2× (yellow card) 3× (suspension)	Globus Hall, Lublin; Attendance: 0 Referees: Loshak, Shajbakov (UKR)

21 February 2021; 14:00	HC Lada (Russia)	30–24	(Poland) MKS Perła Lublin	Olymp Sportlomplex, Togliatti; Attendance: 485; Referees: Aghakishi, Aghakishi (AZE)
21 February 2021; 14:00	Kirdiasheva 8	(17−13)	Nosek 6	Olymp Sportlomplex, Togliatti; Attendance: 485; Referees: Aghakishi, Aghakishi (AZE)
21 February 2021; 14:00	1× (yellow card) 4× (suspension)	Report	2× (yellow card) 3× (suspension)	Olymp Sportlomplex, Togliatti; Attendance: 485; Referees: Aghakishi, Aghakishi (AZE)

21 February 2021; 16:00	Kastamonu Bld. GSK (Turkey)	26–29	(France) Nantes Atlantique	Kastamonu Atatürk Sport Hall, Kastamonu; Attendance: 200; Referees: Nastase, Stancu (ROU)
21 February 2021; 16:00	Kurtović 8	(15–12)	de Paula 10	Kastamonu Atatürk Sport Hall, Kastamonu; Attendance: 200; Referees: Nastase, Stancu (ROU)
21 February 2021; 16:00	2× (yellow card) 2× (suspension)	Report	3× (suspension)	Kastamonu Atatürk Sport Hall, Kastamonu; Attendance: 200; Referees: Nastase, Stancu (ROU)

Cancelled (Note: The match, originally scheduled for 14 February 2021, first was postponed after restrictions of the government in France and later got cancelled.)	Nantes Atlantique (France)	0–10	(Russia) HC Lada

=== Group C ===
Pos	Team	Pld	W	D	L	GF	GA	GD	Pts	Qualification
1	(Romania) CS Minaur Baia Mare	6	5	0	1	150	116	+34	10	Quarterfinals
2	(Russia) Astrakhanochka	6	4	0	2	137	112	+25	8	Quarterfinals
3	(Norway) Storhamar Håndball Elite	6	2	0	4	157	182	−25	4	
4	(Germany) Thüringer HC	6	1	0	5	93	127	−34	2	

Source: EHF

9 January 2021; 14:00	CS Minaur Baia Mare (Romania)	33–29	(Norway) Storhamar Håndball Elite	Sala Sporturilor Lascăr Pană, Baia Mare; Attendance: 0 Referees: Loshak, Shajbakov (UKR)
9 January 2021; 14:00	Kovačević 9	(14–13)	Nestaker 9	Sala Sporturilor Lascăr Pană, Baia Mare; Attendance: 0 Referees: Loshak, Shajbakov (UKR)
9 January 2021; 14:00	1× (yellow card) 3× (suspension)	Report	2× (suspension)	Sala Sporturilor Lascăr Pană, Baia Mare; Attendance: 0 Referees: Loshak, Shajbakov (UKR)

10 January 2021; 14:00	Thüringer HC (Germany)	22–29	(Russia) Astrakhanochka	Salza Halle Bad Langensalza, Bad Langensalza; Attendance: 0 Referees: Carmaux, Mursch (FRA)
10 January 2021; 14:00	Jeřábková 6	(10–12)	Sabirova 5	Salza Halle Bad Langensalza, Bad Langensalza; Attendance: 0 Referees: Carmaux, Mursch (FRA)
10 January 2021; 14:00	1× (suspension)	Report	1× (yellow card) 1× (suspension)	Salza Halle Bad Langensalza, Bad Langensalza; Attendance: 0 Referees: Carmaux, Mursch (FRA)

16 January 2021; 14:00	Storhamar Håndball Elite (Norway)	33–28	(Russia) Astrakhanochka	Boligpartner Arena, Hamar; Attendance: 0 Referees: Rauchs, Linster (LUX)
16 January 2021; 14:00	Nestaker 8	(18–14)	three players 6	Boligpartner Arena, Hamar; Attendance: 0 Referees: Rauchs, Linster (LUX)
16 January 2021; 14:00	3× (suspension)	Report	1× (suspension)	Boligpartner Arena, Hamar; Attendance: 0 Referees: Rauchs, Linster (LUX)

24 January 2021; 14:00	Astrakhanochka (Russia)	33–27	(Romania) CS Minaur Baia Mare	Sportcomplex Zvezdny, Astrakhan; Attendance: 2,000; Referees: Bozhinovski, Nachevski (MKD)
24 January 2021; 14:00	Malashenko 8	(14–8)	Lavko 7	Sportcomplex Zvezdny, Astrakhan; Attendance: 2,000; Referees: Bozhinovski, Nachevski (MKD)
24 January 2021; 14:00	1× (yellow card) 6× (suspension)	Report	3× (yellow card) 2× (suspension)	Sportcomplex Zvezdny, Astrakhan; Attendance: 2,000; Referees: Bozhinovski, Nachevski (MKD)

6 February 2021; 14:00	CS Minaur Baia Mare (Romania)	30–27	(Russia) Astrakhanochka	Sala Sporturilor Lascăr Pană, Baia Mare; Attendance: 0 Referees: Yovchev, Yovchev (BUL)
6 February 2021; 14:00	Kovačević, Lavko 8	(13–15)	Levchenko 7	Sala Sporturilor Lascăr Pană, Baia Mare; Attendance: 0 Referees: Yovchev, Yovchev (BUL)
6 February 2021; 14:00	2× (yellow card) 2× (suspension)	Report	1× (yellow card) 3× (suspension)	Sala Sporturilor Lascăr Pană, Baia Mare; Attendance: 0 Referees: Yovchev, Yovchev (BUL)

6 February 2021; 14:00	Storhamar Håndball Elite (Norway)	32–30	(Germany) Thüringer HC	Salza Halle Bad Langensalza, Bad Langensalza; Attendance: 0 Referees: Lidacka, Lesiak (POL)
6 February 2021; 14:00	Jakobsen 9	(14–14)	three players 7	Salza Halle Bad Langensalza, Bad Langensalza; Attendance: 0 Referees: Lidacka, Lesiak (POL)
6 February 2021; 14:00	2× (yellow card)	Report	3× (yellow card) 3× (suspension)	Salza Halle Bad Langensalza, Bad Langensalza; Attendance: 0 Referees: Lidacka, Lesiak (POL)

7 February 2021; 12:00	Thüringer HC (Germany)	41–36	(Norway) Storhamar Håndball Elite	Salza Halle Bad Langensalza, Bad Langensalza; Attendance: 0 Referees: Lidacka, Lesiak (POL)
7 February 2021; 12:00	Ekenman-Fernis, Rühl 12	(18–15)	Hovden, Jakobsen 8	Salza Halle Bad Langensalza, Bad Langensalza; Attendance: 0 Referees: Lidacka, Lesiak (POL)
7 February 2021; 12:00	1× (yellow card) 2× (suspension) 1× (red card)	Report	2× (yellow card) 4× (suspension)	Salza Halle Bad Langensalza, Bad Langensalza; Attendance: 0 Referees: Lidacka, Lesiak (POL)

10 February 2021; 16:00	Storhamar Håndball Elite (Norway)	27–40	(Romania) CS Minaur Baia Mare	Sala Sporturilor Lascăr Pană, Baia Mare (Note: The home match is being played on away ground due to COVID-19 regulations in Norway); Attendance: 0 Referees: Duplii, Pobedrina (UKR)
10 February 2021; 16:00	Hovden 7	(11–19)	Kovačević 8	Sala Sporturilor Lascăr Pană, Baia Mare; Attendance: 0 Referees: Duplii, Pobedrina (UKR)
10 February 2021; 16:00	2× (yellow card) 5× (suspension)	Report	1× (yellow card) 4× (suspension)	Sala Sporturilor Lascăr Pană, Baia Mare; Attendance: 0 Referees: Duplii, Pobedrina (UKR)

Cancelled (Note: The match, originally scheduled for 13 February 2021, first was postponed then later got cancelled.)	Astrakhanochka (Russia)	10–0	(Germany) Thüringer HC

Cancelled (Note: The match, originally scheduled for 20 February 2021, was not played.)	Astrakhanochka (Russia)	10–0	(Norway) Storhamar Håndball Elite

Cancelled (Note: The match, originally scheduled for 20 February 2021, was not played.)	Thüringer HC (Germany)	0–10	(Romania) CS Minaur Baia Mare

Cancelled (Note: The match, originally scheduled for 21 February 2021, was not played.)	CS Minaur Baia Mare (Romania)	10–0	(Germany) Thüringer HC

=== Group D ===
Pos	Team	Pld	W	D	L	GF	GA	GD	Pts	Qualification
1	(Hungary) Siófok KC	6	5	1	0	181	154	+27	11	Quarterfinals
2	(Romania) HC Dunărea Brăila	6	3	1	2	170	167	+3	7	Quarterfinals
3	(Russia) Kuban	6	2	2	2	130	120	+10	6	
4	(France) Fleury Loiret	6	0	0	6	104	144	−40	0	

Source: EHF

9 January 2021; 18:00	Siófok KC (Hungary)	28–28	(Russia) Kuban	Kiss Szilárd Aréna, Siófok; Attendance: 0 Referees: Sekulić, Jovandić (SRB)
9 January 2021; 18:00	Horacek, Kobetić 9	(15–18)	Savinova 7	Kiss Szilárd Aréna, Siófok; Attendance: 0 Referees: Sekulić, Jovandić (SRB)
9 January 2021; 18:00	2× (yellow card) 1× (suspension)	Report	1× (yellow card) 2× (suspension) 1× (red card)	Kiss Szilárd Aréna, Siófok; Attendance: 0 Referees: Sekulić, Jovandić (SRB)

10 January 2021; 14:00	HC Dunărea Brăila (Romania)	29–27	(France) Fleury Loiret	Sala Polivalentă Danubius, Brăila; Attendance: 0 Referees: Yovchev, Yonchev (BUL)
10 January 2021; 14:00	Dmitrović, Kanaval 6	(15–13)	Ondono 8	Sala Polivalentă Danubius, Brăila; Attendance: 0 Referees: Yovchev, Yonchev (BUL)
10 January 2021; 14:00	1× (yellow card) 3× (suspension)	Report	2× (yellow card) 3× (suspension)	Sala Polivalentă Danubius, Brăila; Attendance: 0 Referees: Yovchev, Yonchev (BUL)

17 January 2021; 12:00	Kuban (Russia)	25–25	(Romania) HC Dunărea Brăila	Olymp Sports Palace, Krasnodar; Attendance: 0 Referees: Serdiuc, Sirbu (MLD)
17 January 2021; 12:00	Golub 9	(13–15)	Dmitrović, Kanaval 7	Olymp Sports Palace, Krasnodar; Attendance: 0 Referees: Serdiuc, Sirbu (MLD)
17 January 2021; 12:00	2× (yellow card) 5× (suspension)	Report	1× (yellow card) 3× (suspension)	Olymp Sports Palace, Krasnodar; Attendance: 0 Referees: Serdiuc, Sirbu (MLD)

17 January 2021; 18:00	Fleury Loiret (France)	24–35	(Hungary) Siófok KC	Palais des Sports d'Orleans, Orléans; Attendance: 0 Referees: Freitas, Carvalho (POR)
17 January 2021; 18:00	Lacrabère 14	(10–20)	Böhme 7	Palais des Sports d'Orleans, Orléans; Attendance: 0 Referees: Freitas, Carvalho (POR)
17 January 2021; 18:00	1× (yellow card) 1× (suspension)	Report	1× (yellow card) 2× (suspension)	Palais des Sports d'Orleans, Orléans; Attendance: 0 Referees: Freitas, Carvalho (POR)

23 January 2021; 14:00	HC Dunărea Brăila (Romania)	25–27	(Hungary) Siófok KC	Sala Polivalentă Danubius, Brăila; Attendance: 0 Referees: Ivanović, Vujisić (MNE)
23 January 2021; 14:00	Kanaval 8	(14–11)	Horacek 6	Sala Polivalentă Danubius, Brăila; Attendance: 0 Referees: Ivanović, Vujisić (MNE)
23 January 2021; 14:00	2× (suspension)	Report	3× (suspension)	Sala Polivalentă Danubius, Brăila; Attendance: 0 Referees: Ivanović, Vujisić (MNE)

7 February 2021; 14:00	Siófok KC (Hungary)	31–24	(Romania) HC Dunărea Brăila	Kiss Szilárd Aréna, Siófok; Attendance: 0 Referees: Hofer, Schmidhuber (AUT)
7 February 2021; 14:00	Ježić 8	(17–14)	Kanaval 6	Kiss Szilárd Aréna, Siófok; Attendance: 0 Referees: Hofer, Schmidhuber (AUT)
7 February 2021; 14:00	1× (yellow card) 4× (suspension)	Report	3× (yellow card) 2× (suspension)	Kiss Szilárd Aréna, Siófok; Attendance: 0 Referees: Hofer, Schmidhuber (AUT)

12 February 2021; 17:30	Kuban (Russia)	25–31	(Hungary) Siófok KC	Olymp Sports Palace, Krasnodar; Attendance: 700; Referees: Şimşek, Hatipoğlu (TUR)
12 February 2021; 17:30	Listopad 5	(10–14)	Horacek 8	Olymp Sports Palace, Krasnodar; Attendance: 700; Referees: Şimşek, Hatipoğlu (TUR)
12 February 2021; 17:30	1× (yellow card) 4× (suspension)	Report	2× (yellow card) 5× (suspension)	Olymp Sports Palace, Krasnodar; Attendance: 700; Referees: Şimşek, Hatipoğlu (TUR)

14 February 2021; 14:00	Fleury Loiret (France)	25–31	(Romania) HC Dunărea Brăila	Palais des Sports d'Orleans, Orléans; Attendance: 0 Referees: Schols, Martens (NED)
14 February 2021; 14:00	Ondono 6	(12–17)	Udriștioiu 7	Palais des Sports d'Orleans, Orléans; Attendance: 0 Referees: Schols, Martens (NED)
14 February 2021; 14:00	3× (suspension)	Report	1× (yellow card) 3× (suspension)	Palais des Sports d'Orleans, Orléans; Attendance: 0 Referees: Schols, Martens (NED)

20 February 2021; 14:00	HC Dunărea Brăila (Romania)	36–32	(Russia) Kuban	Sala Polivalentă Danubius, Brăila; Attendance: 0 Referees: Christidi, Papamattheou (GRE)
20 February 2021; 14:00	Czeczi 8	(17–13)	Golub 8	Sala Polivalentă Danubius, Brăila; Attendance: 0 Referees: Christidi, Papamattheou (GRE)
20 February 2021; 14:00	1× (yellow card) 2× (suspension)	Report	1× (yellow card)	Sala Polivalentă Danubius, Brăila; Attendance: 0 Referees: Christidi, Papamattheou (GRE)

20 February 2021; 16:00	Siófok KC (Hungary)	29–28	(France) Fleury Loiret	Kiss Szilárd Aréna, Siófok; Attendance: 0 Referees: Lidacka, Lesiak (POL)
20 February 2021; 16:00	Tóth 9	(13–13)	Bouktit 8	Kiss Szilárd Aréna, Siófok; Attendance: 0 Referees: Lidacka, Lesiak (POL)
20 February 2021; 16:00	1× (yellow card) 1× (suspension)	Report	1× (yellow card) 5× (suspension) 1× (red card)	Kiss Szilárd Aréna, Siófok; Attendance: 0 Referees: Lidacka, Lesiak (POL)

Cancelled (Note: The match, originally scheduled for 23 January 2021, first was postponed after restrictions of the government in France, then later got cancelled.)	Fleury Loiret (France)	0–10	(Russia) Kuban

Cancelled (Note: The match, originally scheduled for 6 February 2021, first was postponed after restrictions of the French government, then later got cancelled.)	Kuban (Russia)	10–0	(France) Fleury Loiret
