= 2020–21 Women's EHF European League =

European handball tournament

Women's EHF European League
- 2020–21

Tournament information
- Sport: Handball
- Dates: 10 October 2020–9 May 2021
- Teams: 30 (Qualification stage); 16 (Group stage)
- Website: ehfel.com

Final positions
- Champions: (France) Nantes Atlantique
- Runner-up: (Hungary) Siófok KC

Tournament statistics
- Top scorer(s): (Brazil) Bruna de Paula (68 goals)

The 2020–21 Women's EHF European League was the 40th edition of EHF's second-tier women's handball competition, running from 10 October 2020 to 9 May 2021. The tournament was previously called Women's EHF Cup.

There was no defending champion, after last season was cancelled due to the COVID-19 pandemic.

== Overview ==
=== Team allocation ===
Group stage
(Denmark) Herning-Ikast Håndbold	(Hungary) Siófok KC	(Romania) CS Minaur Baia Mare	(Russia) HC Lada
Round 3
(Czech Republic) DHK Baník Most	(Denmark) Nykøbing Falster Håndbold	(Denmark) Viborg HK	(Spain) Super Amara Bera Bera
(France) Fleury Loiret Handball	(France) Nantes Atlantique Handball	(Germany) HSG Blomberg-Lippe	(Germany) TuS Metzingen
(Hungary) DVSC Schaeffler	(Hungary) Váci NKSE	(Norway) Byåsen Håndball Elite	(Norway) Storhamar Håndball Elite
(Poland) MKS Perła Lublin	(Romania) SCM Gloria Buzău	(Russia) Astrakhanochka	(Russia) HC Zvezda
(Sweden) H 65 Höörs HK	(Turkey) Kastamonu Belediyesi GSK		
Round 2
(Austria) Hypo Niederösterreich	(Austria) WAT Atzgersdorf	(France) Paris 92	(Germany) Thüringer HC
(Hungary) Alba Fehérvár KC	(Norway) Molde Elite	(Norway) Tertnes Håndball Elite	(Romania) HC Dunărea Brăila
(Russia) Kuban	(Switzerland) LC Brühl Handball	(Slovakia) IUVENTA Michalovce	(Sweden) Lugi HF

== Round and draw dates ==
The schedule of the competition was as follows (all draws were held at the EHF headquarters in Vienna, Austria). The EHF announced that the originally planned first qualification round in September would be skipped.

Phase	Round	Draw date	First leg	Second leg
Qualification	Second qualifying round	28 July 2020	10–11 October 2020	17–18 October 2020
Qualification	Third qualifying round	20 October 2020	14–15 November 2020	21–22 November 2020
Group stage	Matchday 1	26 November 2020	9–10 January 2021	
Group stage	Matchday 2	26 November 2020	16–17 January 2021	
Group stage	Matchday 3	26 November 2020	23–24 January 2021	
Group stage	Matchday 4	26 November 2020	6–7 February 2021	
Group stage	Matchday 5	26 November 2020	13–14 February 2021	
Group stage	Matchday 6	26 November 2020	20–21 February 2021	
Knockout phase	Quarter-finals	no draw	27–28 March 2021	3–4 April 2021
Knockout phase	Semi finals	15 April 2021	8 May 2021	
Knockout phase	Final	no draw	9 May 2021	

== Qualification stage ==
=== Round 2 ===
There were 12 teams participating in round 2. The first legs were played on 10–11 October and the second legs were played on 16–17 October 2020.

Team 1	Agg.	Team 2	1st leg	2nd leg
HC Dunărea Brăila (Romania)	53–52 ^{1}	(Norway) Tertnes Håndball Elite	28–26	25–26
Molde Elite (Norway)	58–40	(Austria) Hypo Niederösterreich	28–19	30–21
Paris 92 (France)	65–40 ^{2}	(Slovakia) IUVENTA Michalovce	36–14	29–26
WAT Atzgersdorf (Austria)	45–81	(Germany) Thüringer HC	24–39	21–42
Lugi HF (Sweden)	(wo)	(Russia) Kuban	–	–
LC Brühl Handball (Switzerland)	(wo)	(Hungary) Alba Fehérvár KC	–	–

Notes

^{1} Both legs were hosted by HC Dunărea Brăila.
^{2} Both legs were hosted by Paris 92.

=== Round 3 ===
A total of 24 teams entered the draw for the third qualification round, which was held on Tuesday, 20 October 2020.

Pot 1	Pot 2
(Denmark) Nykøbing Falster Håndbold; (Denmark) Viborg HK; (France) Fleury Loiret Handball; (Germany) HSG Blomberg-Lippe; (Germany) TuS Metzingen; (Hungary) DVSC Schaeffler; (Hungary) Váci NKSE; (Norway) Byåsen Håndball Elite; (Norway) Storhamar Håndball Elite; (Romania) SCM Gloria Buzău; (Russia) Astrakhanochka; (Russia) HC Zvezda	(Czech Republic) DHK Baník Most; (Spain) Super Amara Bera Bera; (France) Nantes Atlantique HB; (France) Paris 92; (Germany) Thüringer HC; (Hungary) Alba Fehérvár KC; (Norway) Molde Elite; (Poland) MKS Perła Lublin; (Romania) HC Dunărea Brăila; (Russia) Kuban; (Sweden) H 65 Höörs HK; (Turkey) Kastamonu Belediyesi GSK

The first legs were played on 14–15 November and the second legs were played on 21–22 November 2020.

Team 1	Agg.	Team 2	1st leg	2nd leg
Super Amara Bera Bera (Spain)	51–56	(Russia) HC Zvezda	27–27	24–29
Kastamonu Belediyesi GSK (Turkey)	31–30 ^{1}	(Hungary) DVSC Schaeffler	31–30	–
Byåsen Håndball Elite (Norway)	(wo)	(Poland) MKS Perła Lublin	–	–
HC Dunărea Brăila (Romania)	58–52 ^{2}	(Denmark) Viborg HK	26–24	32–28
Paris 92 (France)	56–42	(Denmark) Nykøbing Falster Håndbold	28–16	28–26
Thüringer HC (Germany)	57–51	(Germany) HSG Blomberg-Lippe	27–31	30–20
Astrakhanochka (Russia)	(wo)	(Norway) Molde Elite	–	–
Fleury Loiret Handball (France)	57–50	(Sweden) H 65 Höörs HK	29–26	28–24
Nantes Atlantique HB (France)	44–43	(Romania) SCM Gloria Buzău	23–16	21–27
Alba Fehérvár KC (Hungary)	(wo)	(Norway) Storhamar Håndball Elite	–	–
DHK Baník Most (Czech Republic)	41–42 ^{1}	(Hungary) Váci NKSE	–	41–42
Kuban (Russia)	(wo)	(Germany) TuS Metzingen	–	–

Notes

^{1} Teams agreed to decide the winner of their tie based one match.
^{2} Both legs were hosted by HC Dunărea Brăila.

== Group stage ==
The draw for the group phase was held on Thursday, 26 November 2020. In each group, teams played against each other in a double round-robin format, with home and away matches.

Tiebreakers
In the group stage, teams were ranked according to points (2 points for a win, 1 point for a draw, 0 points for a loss). After completion of the group stage, if two or more teams have scored the same number of points, the ranking will be determined as follows:
1. Highest number of points in matches between the teams directly involved;
2. Superior goal difference in matches between the teams directly involved;
3. Highest number of goals scored in matches between the teams directly involved (or in the away match in case of a two-team tie);
4. Superior goal difference in all matches of the group;
5. Highest number of plus goals in all matches of the group;

If the ranking of one of these teams is determined, the above criteria are consecutively followed until the ranking of all teams is determined. If no ranking can be determined, a decision shall be obtained by EHF through drawing of lots.

During the group stage, only criteria 4–5 apply to determine the provisional ranking of teams.

=== Group A ===
Pos	Team	Pld	W	D	L	GF	GA	GD	Pts	Qualification	HIH	ZVE	PAR	VAC
1	(Denmark) Herning-Ikast Håndbold	6	5	0	1	198	160	+38	10	Quarterfinals	—	34–25	25–23	39–29
2	(Russia) HC Zvezda	6	3	0	3	135	135	0	6 (Note: HC Zvezda 10–10 Paris 92, HC Zvezda advanced on superior goal difference.)	Quarterfinals	31–39	—	10–0	29–33
3	(France) Paris 92	6	3	0	3	93	101	−8	6		26–23	0–10	—	10–0
4	(Hungary) Váci NKSE	6	1	0	5	150	180	−30	2		26–38	29–30	33–34	—

Source: EHF

=== Group B ===
Pos	Team	Pld	W	D	L	GF	GA	GD	Pts	Qualification	NAN	LAD	LUB	KAS
1	(France) Nantes Atlantique	6	4	0	2	120	115	+5	8	Quarterfinals	—	0–10	25–21	35–26
2	(Russia) HC Lada	6	3	0	3	117	115	+2	6	Quarterfinals	32−29	—	30–24	27–29
3	(Poland) MKS Perla Lublin	6	2	1	3	130	125	+5	5 (Note: MKS Perla Lublin 55–46 Kastamonu Bld. GSK)		26–31	28–23	—	35–26
4	(Turkey) Kastamonu Bld. GSK	6	2	1	3	130	142	−12	5		26–29	29–25	20–20	—

Source: EHF

=== Group C ===
Pos	Team	Pld	W	D	L	GF	GA	GD	Pts	Qualification	BAI	AST	STO	THU
1	(Romania) CS Minaur Baia Mare	6	5	0	1	150	116	+34	10	Quarterfinals	—	30–27	33−29	10–0
2	(Russia) Astrakhanochka	6	4	0	2	137	112	+25	8	Quarterfinals	33–27	—	10–0	10–0
3	(Norway) Storhamar Håndball Elite	6	2	0	4	157	182	−25	4		27–40	33–28	—	32–30
4	(Germany) Thüringer HC	6	1	0	5	93	127	−34	2		0–10	22–29	41–36	—

Source: EHF

=== Group D ===
Pos	Team	Pld	W	D	L	GF	GA	GD	Pts	Qualification	SIO	DUN	KUB	FLE
1	(Hungary) Siófok KC	6	5	1	0	181	154	+27	11	Quarterfinals	—	31–24	28−28	29–28
2	(Romania) HC Dunărea Brăila	6	3	1	2	170	167	+3	7	Quarterfinals	25–27	—	36–32	29–27
3	(Russia) Kuban	6	2	2	2	130	120	+10	6		25–31	25–25	—	10–0
4	(France) Fleury Loiret	6	0	0	6	104	144	−40	0		24–35	25–31	0–10	—

Source: EHF

== Quarterfinals ==
Team 1	Agg.	Team 2	1st leg	2nd leg
HC Lada (Russia)	54–59	(Denmark) Herning-Ikast Håndbold	29–31	25–28
Zvezda Zvenigorod (Russia)	57–63	(France) Nantes Atlantique HB	29–33	28–30
Dunărea Brăila (Romania)	49–58	(Romania) CS Minaur Baia Mare	24–31	25–27
Astrakhanochka (Russia)	54–61	(Hungary) Siófok KC	26–32	28–29

=== Matches ===
27 March 2021; 14:00	HC Lada (Russia)	29–31	(Denmark) Herning-Ikast Håndbold	Olymp Sportlomplex, Togliatti; Attendance: 480; Referees: Ünlü Hatipoğlu, Şimşek (TUR)
27 March 2021; 14:00	Shamanouskaya 6	(17–17)	Fauske 8	Olymp Sportlomplex, Togliatti; Attendance: 480; Referees: Ünlü Hatipoğlu, Şimşek (TUR)
27 March 2021; 14:00	1× (yellow card) 3× (suspension)	Report	1× (yellow card) 3× (suspension)	Olymp Sportlomplex, Togliatti; Attendance: 480; Referees: Ünlü Hatipoğlu, Şimşek (TUR)

3 April 2021; 14:00	Herning-Ikast Håndbold (Denmark)	28–25	(Russia) HC Lada	IBF Arena, Ikast; Attendance: 0 (Note: The match was played behind closed doors due to the COVID-19 pandemic.); Referees: Geraets, Geraets (NED)
3 April 2021; 14:00	Fauske 9	(13–13)	Shcherbak 5	IBF Arena, Ikast; Attendance: 0 Referees: Geraets, Geraets (NED)
3 April 2021; 14:00	1× (yellow card) 2× (suspension)	Report	4× (suspension)	IBF Arena, Ikast; Attendance: 0 Referees: Geraets, Geraets (NED)

27 March 2021; 18:00	HC Zvezda (Russia)	29–33	(France) Nantes Atlantique HB	Olimpiysky Sport Palace, Chekhov; Attendance: 500; Referees: Butskevich, Butskevich (BLR)
27 March 2021; 18:00	two players 6	(16–16)	Kpodar 8	Olimpiysky Sport Palace, Chekhov; Attendance: 500; Referees: Butskevich, Butskevich (BLR)
27 March 2021; 18:00	1× (yellow card) 2× (suspension)	Report	1× (yellow card) 4× (suspension)	Olimpiysky Sport Palace, Chekhov; Attendance: 500; Referees: Butskevich, Butskevich (BLR)

4 April 2021; 14:00	Nantes Atlantique HB (France)	30–28	(Russia) HC Zvezda	Complexe sportif Mangin-Beaulieu, Nantes; Attendance: 0 Referees: Lidacka, Lesiak (POL)
4 April 2021; 14:00	de Paula 6	(15–13)	Nikolaeva, Nikitina 6	Complexe sportif Mangin-Beaulieu, Nantes; Attendance: 0 Referees: Lidacka, Lesiak (POL)
4 April 2021; 14:00	2× (yellow card) 5× (suspension)	Report	1× (yellow card) 7× (suspension)	Complexe sportif Mangin-Beaulieu, Nantes; Attendance: 0 Referees: Lidacka, Lesiak (POL)

27 March 2021; 16:00	HC Dunărea Brăila (Romania)	24–31	(Romania) CS Minaur Baia Mare	Sala Polivalentă Danubius, Brăila; Attendance: 0 Referees: Bytyqi, Kasapi (KOS)
27 March 2021; 16:00	Dmitrović 7	(12–12)	Kovačević 8	Sala Polivalentă Danubius, Brăila; Attendance: 0 Referees: Bytyqi, Kasapi (KOS)
27 March 2021; 16:00	1× (yellow card) 3× (suspension)	Report	1× (yellow card) 4× (suspension)	Sala Polivalentă Danubius, Brăila; Attendance: 0 Referees: Bytyqi, Kasapi (KOS)

4 April 2021; 16:00	CS Minaur Baia Mare (Romania)	27–25	(Romania) HC Dunărea Brăila	Lascăr Pană Sports Hall, Baia Mare; Attendance: 0 Referees: Sirbu, Serdiuc (MDA)
4 April 2021; 16:00	Kovačević 7	(13–14)	Kanaval 6	Lascăr Pană Sports Hall, Baia Mare; Attendance: 0 Referees: Sirbu, Serdiuc (MDA)
4 April 2021; 16:00	2× (suspension)	Report	1× (yellow card) 3× (suspension)	Lascăr Pană Sports Hall, Baia Mare; Attendance: 0 Referees: Sirbu, Serdiuc (MDA)

2 April 2021; 19:00	HC Astrakhanochka (Russia)	26–32	(Hungary) Siófok KC	Kiss Szilárd Sportcsarnok, Siófok; Attendance: 0 Referees: Manea, Iliescu (ROU)
2 April 2021; 19:00	Zelenkova 7	(14–16)	Tomori 9	Kiss Szilárd Sportcsarnok, Siófok; Attendance: 0 Referees: Manea, Iliescu (ROU)
2 April 2021; 19:00	3× (yellow card) 3× (suspension)	Report	3× (yellow card) 1× (suspension)	Kiss Szilárd Sportcsarnok, Siófok; Attendance: 0 Referees: Manea, Iliescu (ROU)

4 April 2021; 14:00	Siófok KC (Hungary)	29–28	(Russia) HC Astrakhanochka	Kiss Szilárd Sportcsarnok, Siófok; Attendance: 0 Referees: Manea, Iliescu (ROU)
4 April 2021; 14:00	Niombla 9	(15–13)	Zelenkova 8	Kiss Szilárd Sportcsarnok, Siófok; Attendance: 0 Referees: Manea, Iliescu (ROU)
4 April 2021; 14:00	3× (yellow card) 2× (suspension)	Report	2× (yellow card) 4× (suspension)	Kiss Szilárd Sportcsarnok, Siófok; Attendance: 0 Referees: Manea, Iliescu (ROU)

== Final four ==
The final four was held at the Sala Sporturilor Lascăr Pană in Baia Mare, Romania on 8 and 9 May 2021. The draw was made on 15 April 2021.

=== Bracket ===
Semifinals
8 May
(France) Nantes Atlantique HB	36
(Romania) CS Minaur Baia Mare	34
8 May
(Hungary) Siófok KC	36
(Denmark) Herning-Ikast Håndbold	34

Final
9 May
(France) Nantes Atlantique HB	36
(Hungary) Siófok KC	31
Third place
9 May
(Romania) CS Minaur Baia Mare	33
(Denmark) Herning-Ikast Håndbold	31

=== Semifinals ===
8 May 2021; 14:45	Nantes Atlantique HB (France)	36–34	(Romania) CS Minaur Baia Mare	Sala Sporturilor Lascăr Pană, Baia Mare; Attendance: 0 Referees: Praštalo, Balvan (BIH)
8 May 2021; 14:45	Hagman 11	(21–15)	Araújo 7	Sala Sporturilor Lascăr Pană, Baia Mare; Attendance: 0 Referees: Praštalo, Balvan (BIH)
8 May 2021; 14:45	2× (yellow card) 3× (suspension)	Report	1× (yellow card) 5× (suspension)	Sala Sporturilor Lascăr Pană, Baia Mare; Attendance: 0 Referees: Praštalo, Balvan (BIH)

8 May 2021; 18:00	Siófok KC (Hungary)	36–34 (a. e. t.)	(Denmark) Herning-Ikast Håndbold	Sala Sporturilor Lascăr Pană, Baia Mare; Attendance: 0 Referees: Ilieva, Karbeska (MKD)
8 May 2021; 18:00	Horacek 7	(19–18)	Kristensen 8	Sala Sporturilor Lascăr Pană, Baia Mare; Attendance: 0 Referees: Ilieva, Karbeska (MKD)
8 May 2021; 18:00	2× (yellow card) 2× (suspension)	Report	3× (yellow card) 1× (suspension)	Sala Sporturilor Lascăr Pană, Baia Mare; Attendance: 0 Referees: Ilieva, Karbeska (MKD)

=== Third place game ===
9 May 2021; 14:45	Herning-Ikast Håndbold (Denmark)	31–33	(Romania) CS Minaur Baia Mare	Sala Sporturilor Lascăr Pană, Baia Mare; Attendance: 0 Referees: Lidacka, Lesiak (POL)
9 May 2021; 14:45	Johansen 6	(19–16)	Kovačević 11	Sala Sporturilor Lascăr Pană, Baia Mare; Attendance: 0 Referees: Lidacka, Lesiak (POL)
9 May 2021; 14:45	2× (yellow card) 2× (suspension)	Report	3× (suspension)	Sala Sporturilor Lascăr Pană, Baia Mare; Attendance: 0 Referees: Lidacka, Lesiak (POL)

=== Final ===
9 May 2021; 18:00	Siófok KC (Hungary)	31–36	(France) Nantes Atlantique HB	Sala Sporturilor Lascăr Pană, Baia Mare; Attendance: 0 Referees: Vranes, Wenninger (AUT)
9 May 2021; 18:00	Tóth 7	(13–17)	Hagman 7	Sala Sporturilor Lascăr Pană, Baia Mare; Attendance: 0 Referees: Vranes, Wenninger (AUT)
9 May 2021; 18:00	1× (yellow card) 6× (suspension)	Report	1× (yellow card) 3× (suspension)	Sala Sporturilor Lascăr Pană, Baia Mare; Attendance: 0 Referees: Vranes, Wenninger (AUT)

== Top goalscorers ==
Rank	Player	Club	Goals
1	(Brazil) Bruna de Paula	(France) Nantes Atlantique HB	68
2	(Norway) Helene Gigstad Fauske	(Denmark) Herning-Ikast Håndbold	61
3	(Serbia) Jovana Kovačević	(Romania) CS Minaur Baia Mare	55
4	(Romania) Aneta Udriștioiu	(Romania) HC Dunărea Brăila	51
5	(France) Tamara Horacek	(Hungary) Siófok KC	49
6	(France) Déborah Kpodar	(France) Nantes Atlantique HB	48
7	(Norway) Amanda Kurtović	(Turkey) Kastamonu Bld. GSK	46
8	(Croatia) Katarina Ježić	(Hungary) Siófok KC	44
9	(Russia) Natalia Nikitina	(Russia) Zvezda Zvenigorod	43
10	(Belarus) Maria Kanaval	(Romania) HC Dunărea Brăila	42

== See also ==
- 2020–21 Women's EHF Champions League
- 2020–21 Women's EHF European Cup
- 2020–21 Men's EHF European League
