= Garanin =

Garanin (Russian: Гаранин) is a Russian masculine surname, its feminine counterpart is Garanina. It may refer to:

- Dmitry Garanin, Russian-American physicist
- Elena Garanina (born 1956), Russian ice dancer
- Ivan Garanin (born 1945), Russian cross-country skier
- Vadim Garanin (born 1970), Russian football coach and former player
- Veronika Nikitina (born 1992), born Garanina, Russian handball player

== See also ==
- Garanin general-purpose machine guns
