= Orlane Ahanda =

French handball player (born 1998)

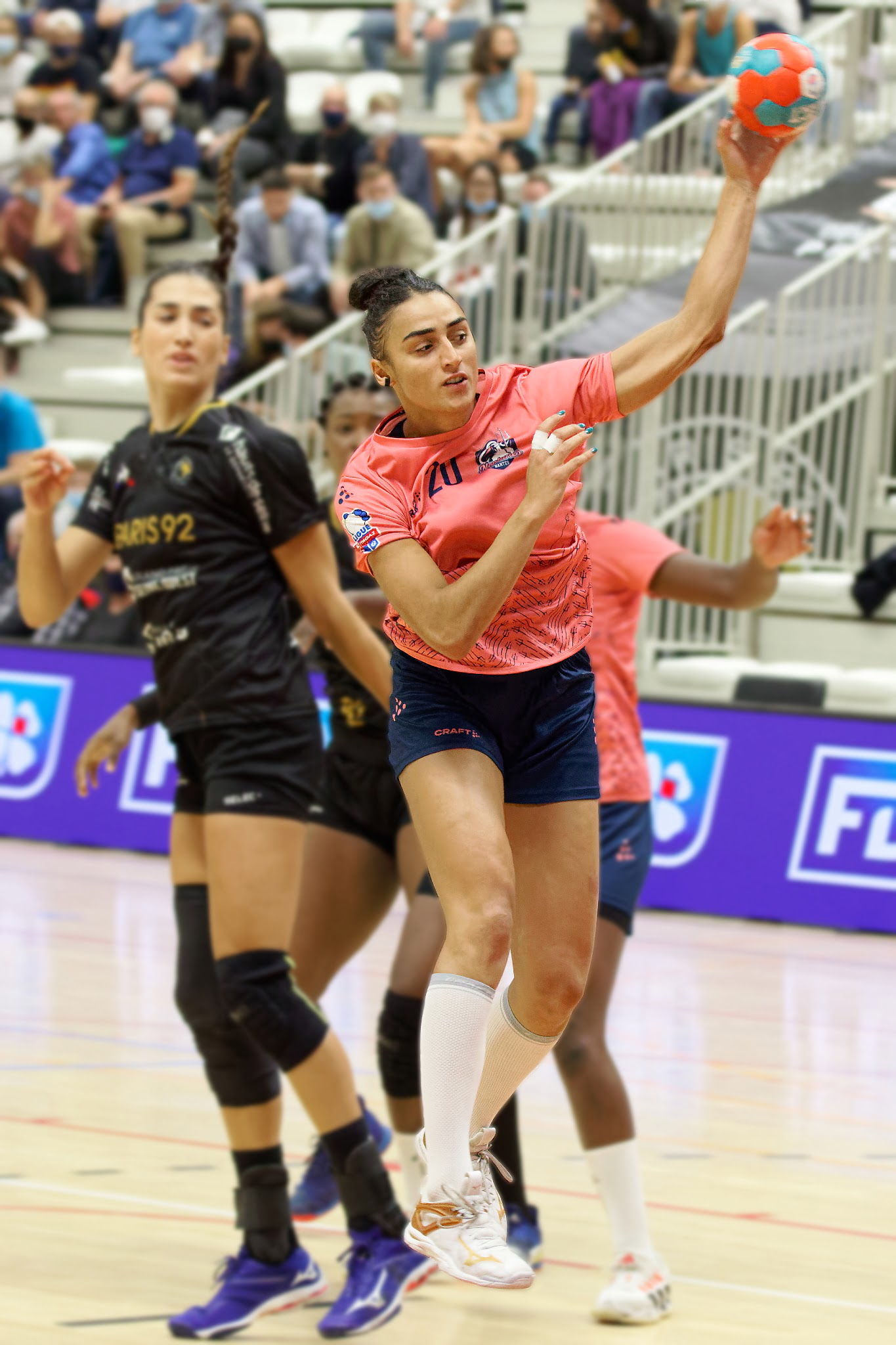
- Orlane Ahanda (2021)

Personal information
- Nationality: French
- Born: 20 November 1998 (age 27) Nantes, France
- Height: 1.78 m (5 ft 10 in)

Sport
- Sport: Handball
- Position: Right back
- Current club: Neptunes de Nantes
- Number: 20

Youth career
- Years: Team
- –: ALPAC Nantes
- 2011–2017: Neptunes de Nantes

Senior clubs
- Years: Team
- 2017–: Neptunes de Nantes
National team
Years	Team	Apps	(Gls)
2021–	France	8	(3)
Medal record
World Championship
Silver medal – second place	2021 Spain
- Updated on 22 December 2025

Orlane Ahanda (born 20 November 1998) is a French handball player who plays for Neptunes de Nantes and the French national team.

== Career ==
Ahanda started playing handball at ALPAC Nantes before joining the youth team of Neptunes de Nantes in 2011. In 2016 she won the French U18 Championship with the club. She made her senior debut on 30 September 2016 against Brest Bretagne Handball. In February 2020 she signed her first professional contract with the club.

With the club she won the 2020-21 European League, beating Hungarian Siófok KC in the final.

When Neptunes de Nantes declared bankruptcy in 2024, she followed the team into the LFH Division 2 Féminine.

=== National team ===
Ahanda made her debut for the French national team on October 6th, 2021 against Czechia. At the 2021 she replace the injured Laura Flippes. At this occasion she won silver medals, losing to Norway in the final.
