= Mari Finstad Bergum =

Norwegian handball player (born 1998)

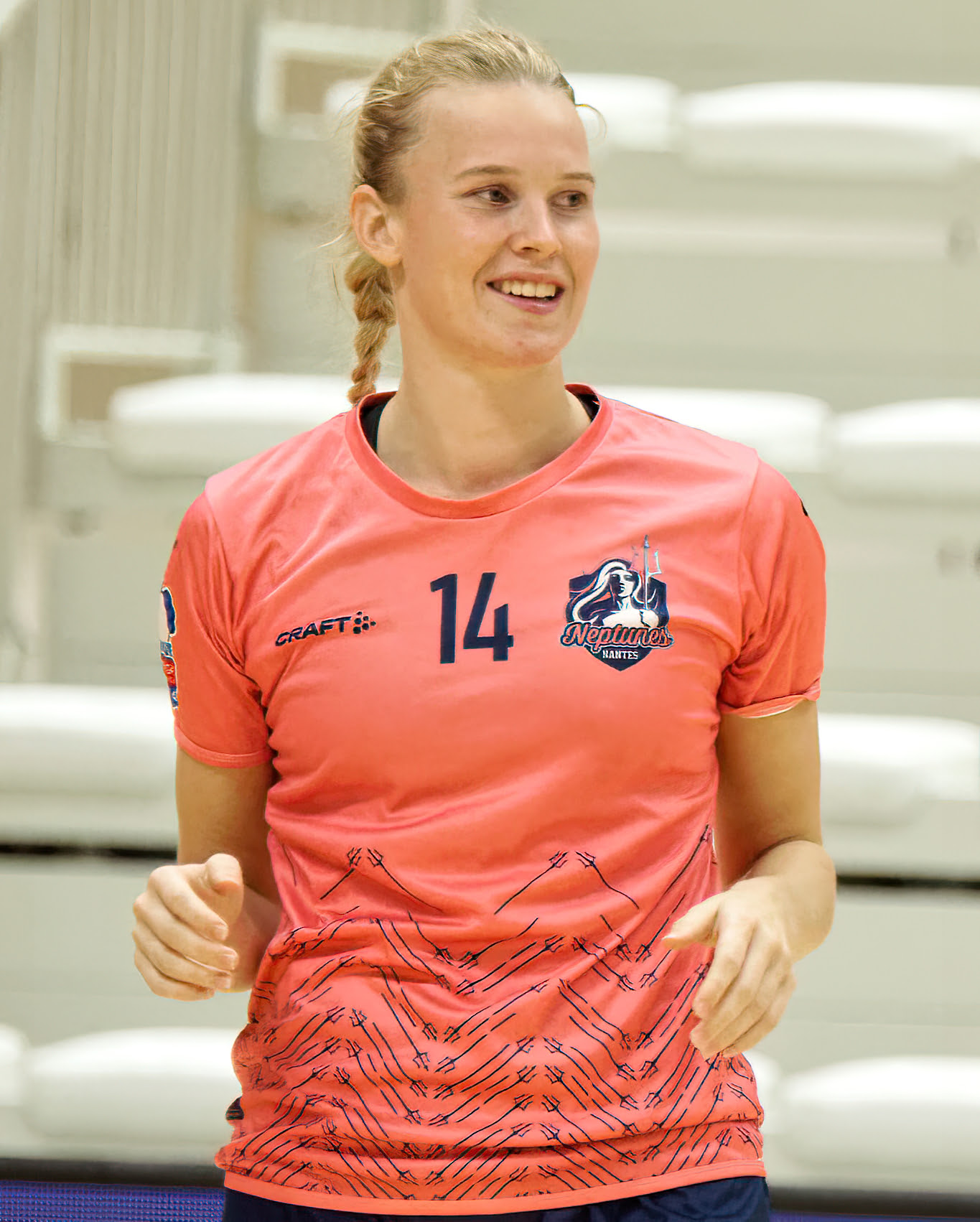
- Mari Finstad Bergum (2021)

Personal information
- Full name: Mari Finstad Bergum
- Nationality: Norwegian
- Born: 16 March 1998 (age 28) Gjøvik, Norway
- Height: 1.78 m (5 ft 10 in)

Sport
- Sport: Handball
- Position: Left back
- Current club: Toulon Métropole Var Handball
- Number: 4

Senior clubs
- Years: Team
- 2015–2016: Storhamar HE
- 2016–2017: Gjøvik HK
- 2017–2019: Larvik HK
- 2019–2021: Flint Tønsberg
- 2021–2024: Neptunes de Nantes
- 2024–2026: Toulon Métropole Var Handball

Mari Finstad Bergum (born 16 March 1998) is a Norwegian handball player who plays for Toulon Métropole Var Handball.

She also represented Norway in the 2017 Women's Junior European Handball Championship, placing 7th, and in the 2016 Women's Youth World Handball Championship, placing 4th.

She is also a part of Norway's national recruit team in handball.

== Achievements ==
- Norwegian League:
  - Silver medalist: 2017/18
- EHF European League:
  - Winner: 2021
