= Dominik Klein =

German handball player (born 1983)

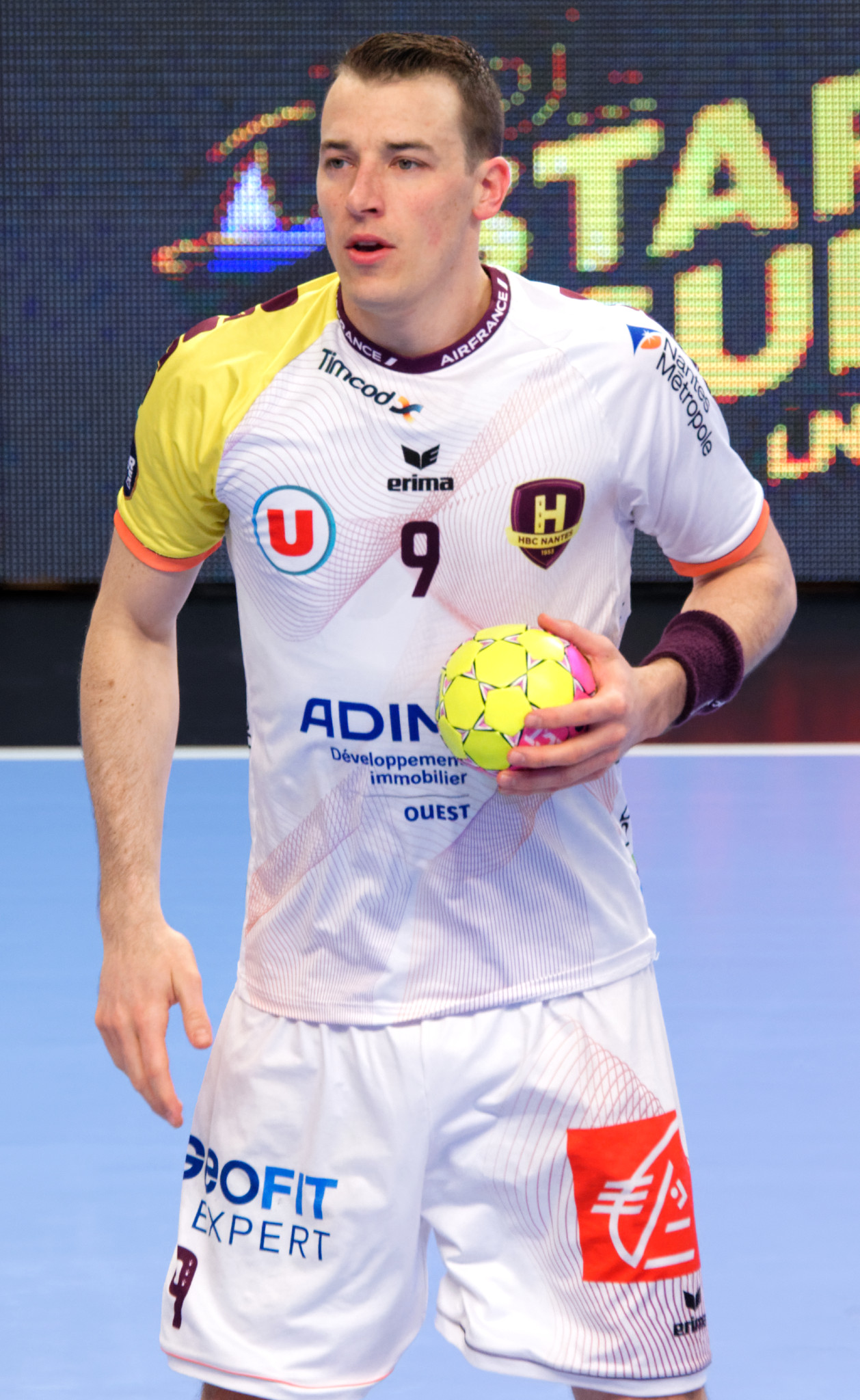
- Dominik Klein in 2018

Personal information
- Full name: Dominik Walter Roland Klein
- Nationality: German
- Born: 16 December 1983 (age 42) Miltenberg, West Germany
- Height: 1.90 m (6 ft 3 in)

Sport
- Sport: Handball
- Position: Left wing
- Current club: Retired
- Number: 9

Senior clubs
- Years: Team
- 1998–2002: TUSPO Obernburg
- 2002–2003: TV Großwallstadt
- 2003–2005: SG Wallau-Massenheim
- 2005–2006: TV Großwallstadt
- 2006–2016: THW Kiel
- 2016–2018: HBC Nantes
National team
Years	Team	Apps	(Gls)
2005–2018	Germany	187	(370)
Medal record
World Championship
Gold medal – first place	2007 Germany

Dominik Walter Roland Klein (born 16 December 1983) is a former German handball player who last played for HBC Nantes.

He is World champion from 2007 with the German national team. He participated on the German team that finished 4th at the 2008 European Men's Handball Championship.

== Club player ==
Klein began playing handball at TUSPO Obernburg, and joined TV Großwallstadt in 2002. A season later he joined SG Wallau-Massenheim. In 2005 returned to TV Großwallstadt. He then played for the German club THW Kiel which won both the EHF Champions League and the EHF Men's Champions Trophy in 2007, in addition to winning German championships. Lastly he played for HBC Nantes in France.

On 22 March 2018, he announced his retirement for the end of the 2017–18 season.

== National team ==
He debuted for the German national team on 4 January 2003 against Hungary. In 2007 he won the World Championship, for which he was awarded the Silbernes Lorbeerblatt.

== Personalities ==
In 2009 he married his girlfriend Isabell, who is a handball player (Buxtehuder SV), too. They are the only family in Germany who has a handball player in both the men and the women national team.
