= Elisabeth Chávez =

Spanish handball player (born 1990)

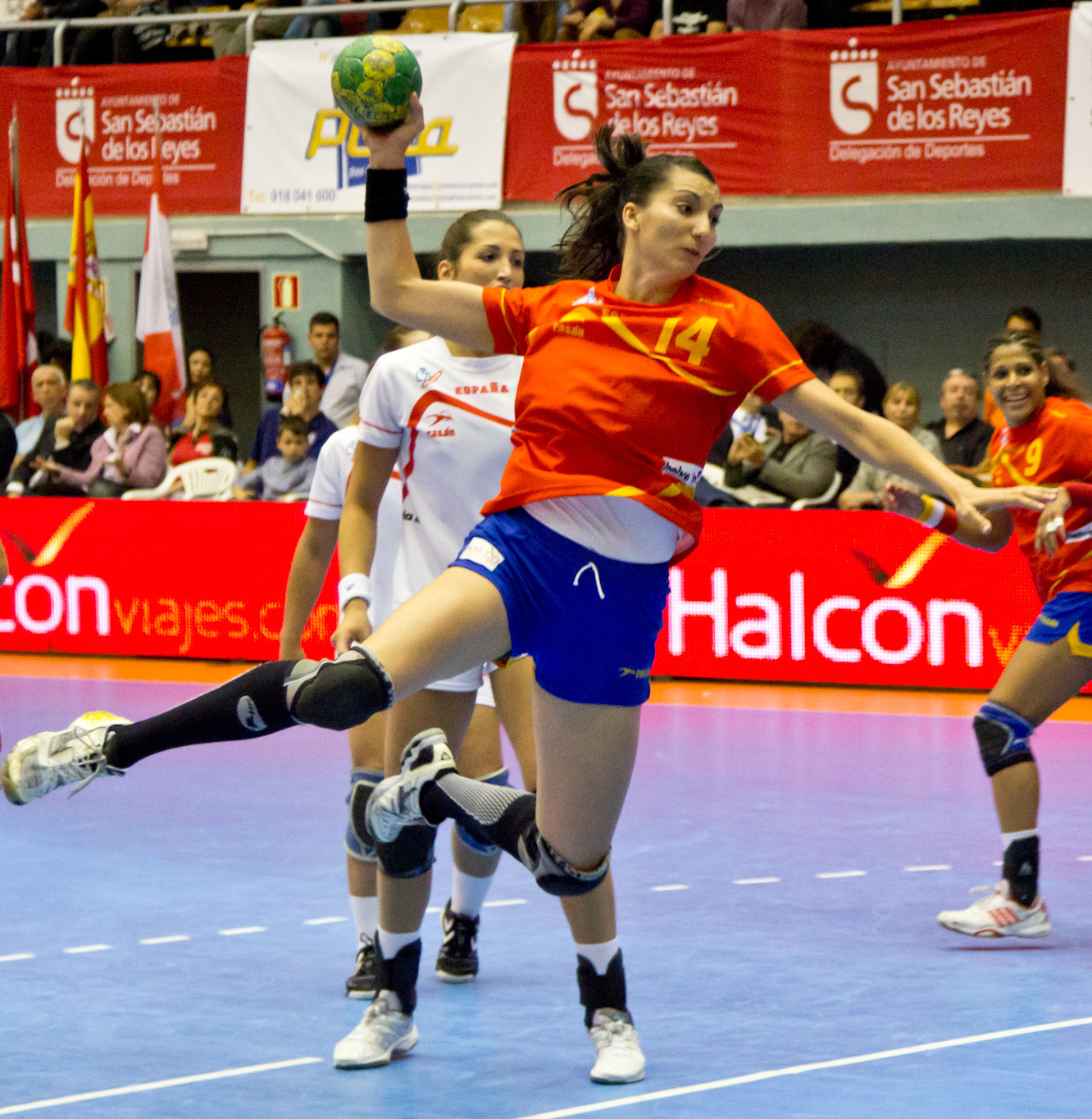
- Chávez in 2013

Personal information
- Full name: Elisabeth Chávez Hernández
- Nationality: Spanish
- Born: 17 November 1990 (age 35) Los Realejos, Tenerife, Spain
- Height: 1.92 m (6 ft 4 in)

Sport
- Sport: Handball
- Position: Pivot
- Current club: Handball Plan-de-Cuques
- Number: 14

Senior clubs
- Years: Team
- 2007–2012: BM Sagunto
- 2012–2015: OGC Nice
- 2015–2017: Fleury Loiret HB
- 2017-2019: Nantes Loire Atlantique
- 2019-: Handball Plan-de-Cuques
National team
Years	Team	Apps	(Gls)
2008-	Spain	185	(130)
Medal record
World Championship
Bronze medal – third place	2011 Brazil
European Championship
Silver medal – second place	2008 Macedonia
Silver medal – second place	2014 Croatia/Hungary
- Updated on 26 November 2023

Elisabeth Chávez Hernández (born 17 November 1990) is a Spanish handball player for Handball Plan-de-Cuques in France. She has previously played for Nantes Loire Atlantique and the Spanish women's national team.

She was part of the Spanish team at the 2008 European Women's Handball Championship, where the Spanish team reached the final, after defeating Germany in the semifinal. She also competed at the 2011 World Women's Handball Championship in Brazil, where the Spanish team placed third.
