= Takoua Chabchoub =

Tunisian handball player

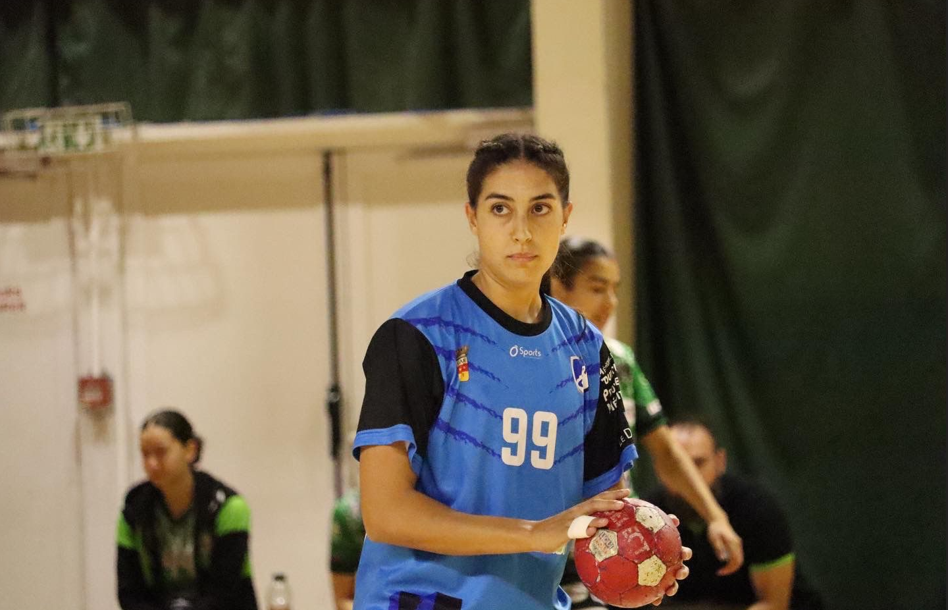

Personal information
- Nationality: Tunisian
- Born: 10 March 1993 (age 33) La Marsa, Tunisia
- Height: 1.72 m (5 ft 8 in)

Sport
- Sport: Handball
- Position: Centre back
- Current club: OGC Nice
- Number: 33

Senior clubs
- Years: Team
- 2011-2017: HB Gardéen
- 2017-2019: OGC Nice
- 2019-2025: HB Gardéen
National team
Years	Team	Apps	(Gls)
–	Tunisia	14	(22)

Takoua Chabchoub (born 10 March 1993) is a Tunisian handball player for OGC Nice and the Tunisian national team.

She participated at the 2017 World Women's Handball Championship.
