= Jane Schumacher =

Danish handball player (born 1988)

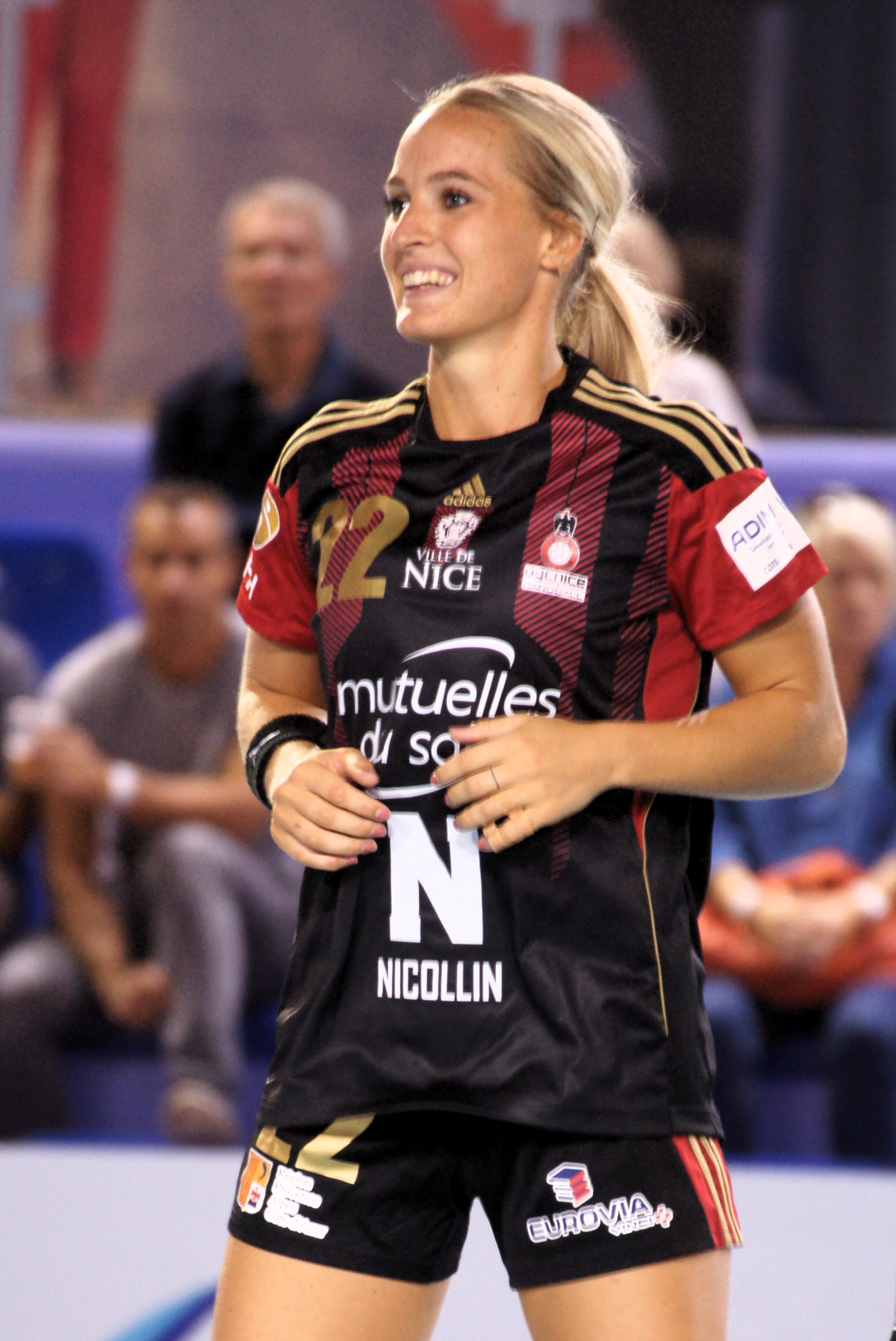

Personal information
- Nationality: Danish
- Born: 27 August 1988 (age 38) Tinglev, Denmark
- Height: 1.73 m (5 ft 8 in)

Sport
- Sport: Handball
- Position: Central back
- Current club: OGC Nice Côte d'Azur Handball
- Number: 15

Senior clubs
- Years: Team
- 2006-2008: Viborg HK
- 2008-2014: Skive fH
- 2014-2016: Randers HK
- 2016-2018: OGC Nice
- 2018-2021: Silkeborg-Voel KFUM
National team
Years	Team	Apps	(Gls)
2013-2016	Denmark	24	(25)
Medal record
World Championship
Bronze medal – third place	2013 Serbia	Team
- Updated on January 2024

Jane Schumacher (born 27 August 1988) is a Danish former team handball player. She played for the club OGC Nice Côte d'Azur Handball in France as well as a number of Danish clubs throughout her career. She also featured on the Danish national team. At the 2013 World Championship, she was a part of the Danish team that won bronze medals, breaking a 9-year streak without medals for the Danish team. They beat Poland 30–26. She retired in 2021.

In 2014 she completed the education as a teacher.
