= Marie-Hélène Sajka =

French handball player (born 1997)

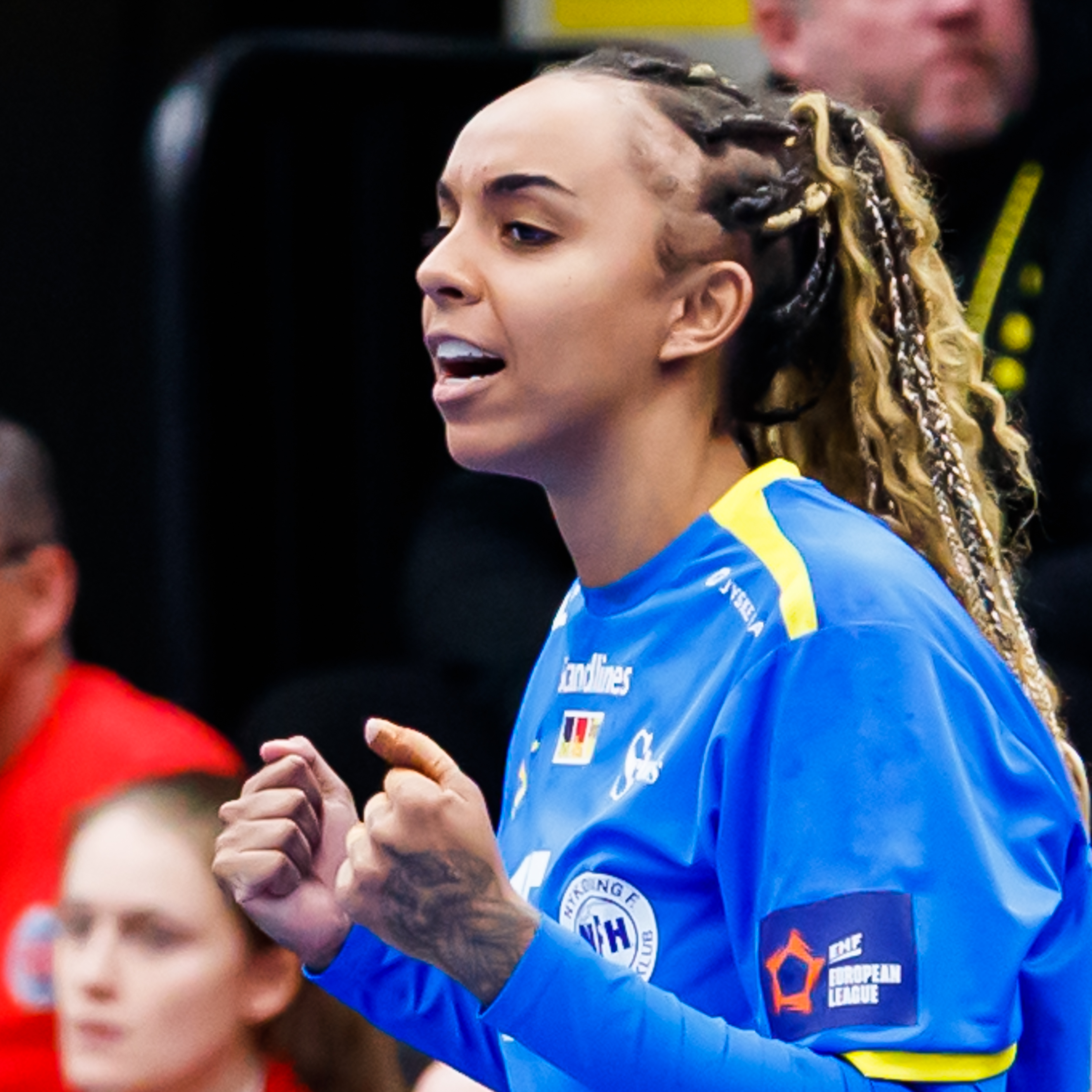
- Marie-Hélène Sajka (2023)

Personal information
- Nationality: French
- Born: 13 September 1997 (age 29) Nancy, France
- Height: 1.85 m (6 ft 1 in)

Sport
- Sport: Handball
- Position: Right back
- Current club: OGC Nice
- Number: 25

Senior clubs
- Years: Team
- 2015–2021: Metz Handball
- 2021–2022: Paris 92
- 2022–2023: Nykøbing Falster Håndboldklub
- 2023–2024: Neptunes de Nantes
- 2024–2026: OGC Nice
- 2026–: SCM Râmnicu Vâlcea
National team
Years	Team	Apps	(Gls)
2017–	France	16	(24)
Medal record
World Championship
Bronze medal – third place	2025 Germany/Netherlands
- Updated on 18 December 2025

Marie-Hélène Sajka (born 13 September 1997) is a French handball player who plays for OGC Nice.

For the 2025 World Championship she won bronze medals losing to Germany in the semifinal and beating Netherlands in extra time in the third place playoff.

== Achievements ==
- French Championship:
  - Winner: 2016, 2017, 2018
- EHF European League:
  - Runners-up: 2023
