= Beatriz Escribano =

Spanish handball player (born 1990)

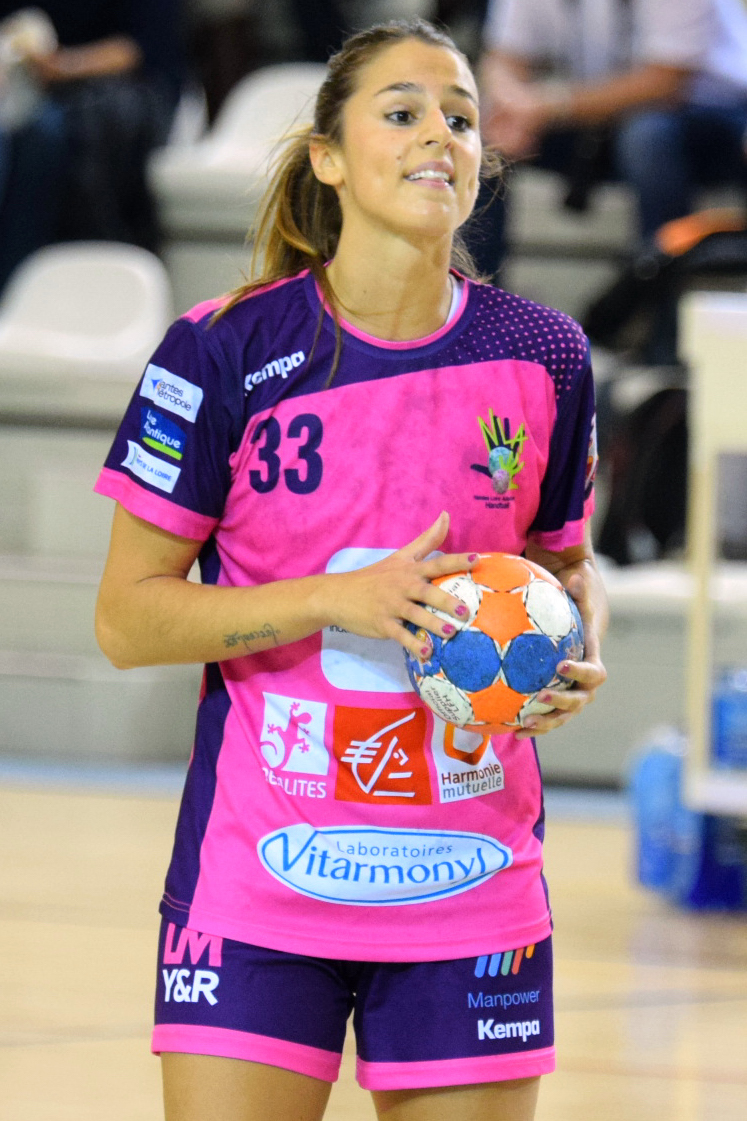

Personal information
- Full name: Beatriz Escribano Sánchez Mateos
- Nationality: Spanish
- Born: 4 May 1990 (age 36) Ciudad Real, Spain
- Height: 1.77 m (5 ft 10 in)

Sport
- Sport: Handball
- Position: Centre back
- Current club: Nantes Loire Atlantique Handball
- Number: 33

Senior clubs
- Years: Team
- 2007-2012: BM Sagunto
- 2012-2015: Nice Handball
- 2015-: Nantes Handball
National team
Years	Team	Apps	(Gls)
2009-	Spain	37	(14)
Medal record
European Championship
Silver medal – second place	2014 Croatia/Hungary	Team

Beatriz Escribano (born 4 May 1990) is a Spanish handball player for Nantes Loire Atlantique Handball since June 2015 and the Spanish national team.
