= Nantes Handball Féminin =

French handball club

- Full name: Nantes Handball Féminin
- Founded: 1998
- Arena: Complexe sportif Mangin-Beaulieu, Nantes
- Capacity: 2,400
- President: Yoann Choin-Joubert
- Head coach: Camille Comte
- League: Division 2 Féminin
- 2024-25: 3rd
- Club colours
Home	Away

Nantes Handball Féminin (previously Neptunes de Nantes and Nantes Atlantique Handball) is the name of a French professional handball club from Nantes. The team competed in the French Women's Handball First League between 2013 and 2024. From 2024, it competes in the second league, Division 2 Féminin.

== History ==
The club was founded in 1998 as Nantes Loire Atlantique Handball. In 2018 they changed their name to Nantes Atlantique Handball. In 2021 the club changed name from Nantes Atlantique Handball to Neptunes de Nantes. The club was created to replace ASPTT Nantes.

The club was promoted to the Division 2, the second tier, in 2003. In 2005 they were relegated again. In 2011 they were promoted to Division 2 for a second time, and in 2013 they won the division to be promoted to the French Women's Handball First League.

In 2021 they won their first European title, when they won the 2020–21 Women's EHF European League.

After the club's sponsor withdrew in 2024, the club declared bankruptcy on 31 July 2024 and lost their position in the top french league. The club was renamed Nantes Handball Féminin, and restarted in the 2nd tier, LFH Division 2 Féminine. In their first season refounded they finished 2nd behind Le Havre AC, but they were not promoted.

=== Naming history ===
- Nantes Loire Atlantique Handball (1998-2018)
- Nantes Atlantique Handball (2018-2021)
- Neptunes de Nantes (2021-2024)
- Nantes Handball Féminin (2024-)

=== Presidents ===
- Patrick Houry : June 1998 - June 2003
- Véronique Laime : July 2003 - January 2006
- Patrick Houry : February 2006 - June 2010
- Philippe Aubry : July 2010 - June 2011
- Arnaud Ponroy : July 2011 - January 2021
- Daniel Pellerin : January 2021 - April 2024
- Pascal Gentil : April 2024 -

== Honours ==
- EHF European League:
  - Winner: 2021
- LFH Division 2 Féminine
  - Winner: 2013
- Championnat de France de Nationale 1
  - Winner: 2003, 2011

== Team ==
=== Current squad ===
Squad for the 2024–25 season.

Goalkeepers

- 31 (France) Agathe Quiniou
- 72 (France) Cecilia Errin
- 97 (France) Lola Boiteux

Wingers
RW

- 35 (France) Albane Frachon

LW

- 2 (France) Mélina Michaud
- 18 (France) Naémi Ardouin
- 44 (France) Alizée Martin

Line players

- 3 (France) Dagui Assana
- 6 (France) Imen Chagh
- 13 (France) Esther Pelenda

Back players

LB

- 10 (France) Laly Coutte
- 16 (France) Yvana Richard

CB

- 11 (France) Vanira Van Sou
- 21 (France) Ambre Leveque

RB

- 5 (France) Laly Herve
- 19 (France) Shana Conan
- 20 (France) Orlane Ahanda
- 32 (France) Nolwen Verton
- 34 (France) Eva Mbata

Squad information
No.	Nat.	Player	Position	In	Contract until	Previous club
1	(Sweden)	Jessica Ryde	Goalkeeper	2023	2026	(Denmark) Herning-Ikast
12	(France)	Floriane André	Goalkeeper	2018	2024	
31	(Netherlands)	kelly Vollebregt	Right wing	2023	2025	(Denmark) Odense Håndbold
11	(France)	Oriane Ondono	Line Player	2021	2025	(France) CJF Fleury Loiret
8	(Sweden)	Carin Strömberg	Centre back	2021	2025	(Denmark) Viborg HK
15	(France)	Marie Hélène Sajka	Right back	2023	2025	(Denmark) Nykøbing Falster Håndboldklub
14	(Norway)	Mari Finstad Bergum	Left back	2021	2025	(Norway) Flint Tønsberg
17	(France)	Marine Dupuis	Left wing	2022	2024	(France) Toulon Métropole Var Handball
19	(Sweden)	Anna Lagerquist	Line Player	2022	2024	(Russia) Rostov-Don
20	(France)	Orlane Ahanda	Right back	2011	2025	
29	(France)	Léna Grandveau	Centre back	2022	2025	(France) Bourg-de-Péage Drôme Handball
22	(France)	Tamara Horacek	Left back	2023	2026	(France) Metz Handball
42	(France)	Dyénaba Sylla	Left wing	2020	2024	(France) Jeanne d'Arc Dijon Handball
77	(France)	Emilie Bellec	Right wing	2023	2024	
7	(Norway)	Helene Gigstad Fauske	Center Back	2023	2025	(France) Brest Bretagne Handball
18	(France)	Naemi Ardouin	Left wing	2023	2026	

=== Transfers ===
Transfers for the 2024–25 season

Joining

Leaving

- (France) Floriane André (GK) (to (France) Brest Bretagne Handball)
- (France) Oriane Ondono (LP) (to (France) Brest Bretagne Handball)
- (France) Marine Dupuis (LW) (to (France) OGC Nice Handball)
- (France) Marie-Hélène Sajka (RB) (to (France) OGC Nice Handball)
- (France) Tamara Horacek (LB) (to (Slovenia) RK Krim)
- (Norway) Helene Gigstad Fauske (CB) (to (Denmark) Odense Håndbold)
- (Norway) Mari Finstad Bergum (LB) (to (France) Toulon Métropole Var Handball)
- (Netherlands) Kelly Vollebregt (RW) (to (Germany) Borussia Dortmund Handball)
- (Denmark) Helle Thomsen (Coach) (to (Romania) CSM București)
- (France) Léna Grandveau (CB) (to (France) Metz Handball)
- (France) Paola Ebanga Baboga (RB) (to (France) Saint-Amand Handball)
- (Hungary) Blanka Kajdon (CB) (to (Germany) BSV Sachsen Zwickau)
- (Sweden) Jessica Ryde (GK) (to (Hungary) Debreceni VSC)
- (Sweden) Anna Lagerquist (LP) (to (Hungary) Győri Audi ETO KC)

=== Staff members ===
Staff for the 2024–25 season.

- (Denmark) Head coach: Camille Comte
- (France) Training coach: Loreta Ivanauskaite

=== Notable players ===
- (France) Camille Ayglon-Saurina
- (France) Blandine Dancette
- (France) Pauline Coatanea
- (France) Camille Aoustin
- (France) Kalidiatou Niakaté
- (France) Estelle Nze Minko
- (France) Catherine Gabriel
- (Spain) Alexandrina Cabral
- (Spain) Elisabeth Chávez
- (Spain) Beatriz Escribano
- (Spain) Kaba Gassama
- (Brazil) Bruna de Paula
- (Brazil) Fabiana Diniz
- (Brazil) Elaine Gomes
- (Croatia) Sonja Bašić
- (Croatia) Dragica Džono
- (Croatia) Ivana Lovrić
- (Denmark) Lotte Grigel
- (Denmark) Stine Bodholt Nielsen
- (Denmark) Mia Møldrup
- (Norway) Anette Helene Hansen
- (Norway) Malin Holta
- (Norway) Helene Gigstad Fauske
- (Norway) Mari Finstad Bergum
- (Serbia) Jovana Stoiljković
- (Serbia) Katarina Tomašević
- (Netherlands) Esther Schop
- (Netherlands) Isabelle Jongenelen
- (Hungary) Szabina Mayer
- (Tunisia) Maroua Dhaouadi
- (Germany) Isabell Klein

=== Coaching history ===
- (France) Florence Sauval : 2001 - 2004
- (France) Stéphane Moualek : 2010 - 2014
- (Czech Republic) Jan Bašný : 2014 - 2018
- (France) Frédéric Bougeant : June 2018 - November 2018
- (France) Guillaume Saurina and Loréta Ivanauskas : interim
- (Denmark) Allan Heine : December 2018 - 2020
- (France) Guillaume Saurina 2020 - February 2022
- (Denmark) Helle Thomsen : February 2022 - 2024
- (France) Camille Comte : 2024 -
