= Marjan Kolev =

Macedonian handball player (born 1977)

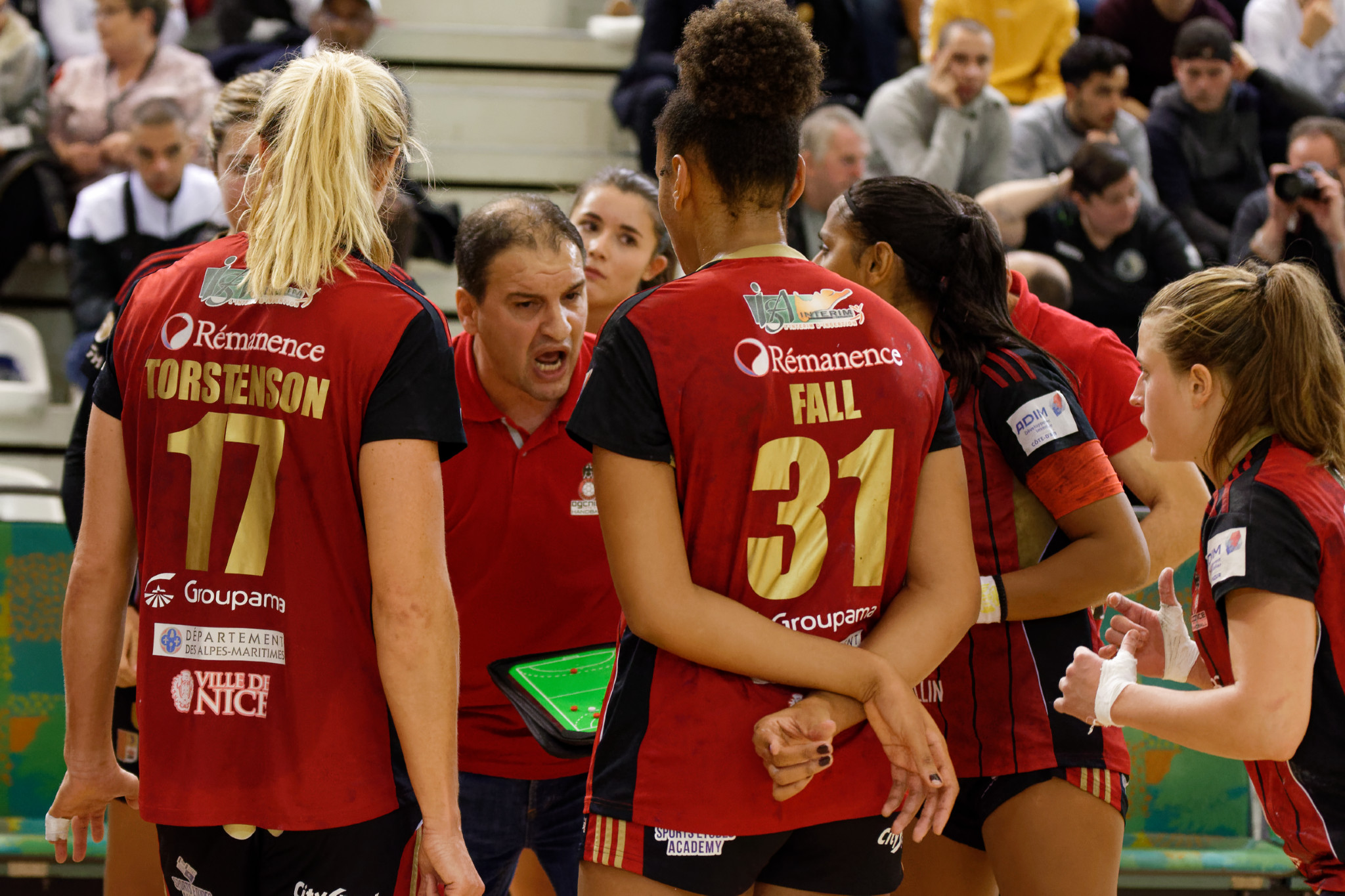

Personal information
- Nationality: Macedonian
- Born: 4 April 1977 (age 49) Kavadarci, SR Macedonia, SFR Yugoslavia
- Height: 180 cm (71 in)

Sport
- Sport: Handball
- Position: Centre back
- Current club: Retired

Youth career
- Years: Team
- –: Vardar

Senior clubs
- Years: Team
- 1994–2000: Vardar Vatrostalna Skopje
- 2000-2002: MKDRK Tutunski Kombinat Prilep
- 2002-2005: Vardar Vatrostalna Skopje
- 2005: Pallamano Trieste
- 2005-2006: Zamet Rijeka
- 2007-2008: Villefranche
- 2008-2009: Gonfreville
- 2009-2013: Montélimar
- 2013-2016: St-Egrève
National team
- Years: Team
- –2006: Macedonia

Teams managed
- 2013-2016: St-Egrève
- 2016-2022: OGC Nice

Marjan Kolev (born 4 April 1977) is a former Macedonian handball player who played for the Macedonian national team. From 2016 to 2022 he was currently a coach in French club OGC Nice.

== Career ==
As a player Kolev started out in Vardar. At the club in two spells he won eight domestic titles. The club also reached the third place in the 1998-99 EHF Cup Winners' Cup. For two years he played for Tutunski Kombinat Prilep who won the Macedonian Handball Cup in 2002. For the second part of 2004-05 season, he moved to Italian top club Pallamano Trieste, and stayed in Italy until the end of the season. After the italian experience, Kolev moved to Croatian side Zamet Rijeka where he played for one season finishing in sixth place with the club after championship play-offs. He played in France for Villefranche, Gonfreville, Montélimar and St-Egrève before retiring.

== Honours ==
RK Vardar

- Macedonian Handball Super League (4): 1998-99, 2001-02, 2002-03, 2003-04
- Macedonian Handball Cup (4): 1997, 2000, 2003, 2004
- EHF Cup Winners' Cup third place (1): 1998-99

Tutunski Kombinat

- Macedonian Handball Cup (1): 2002
