= Marine Dupuis =

French handball player (born 1992)

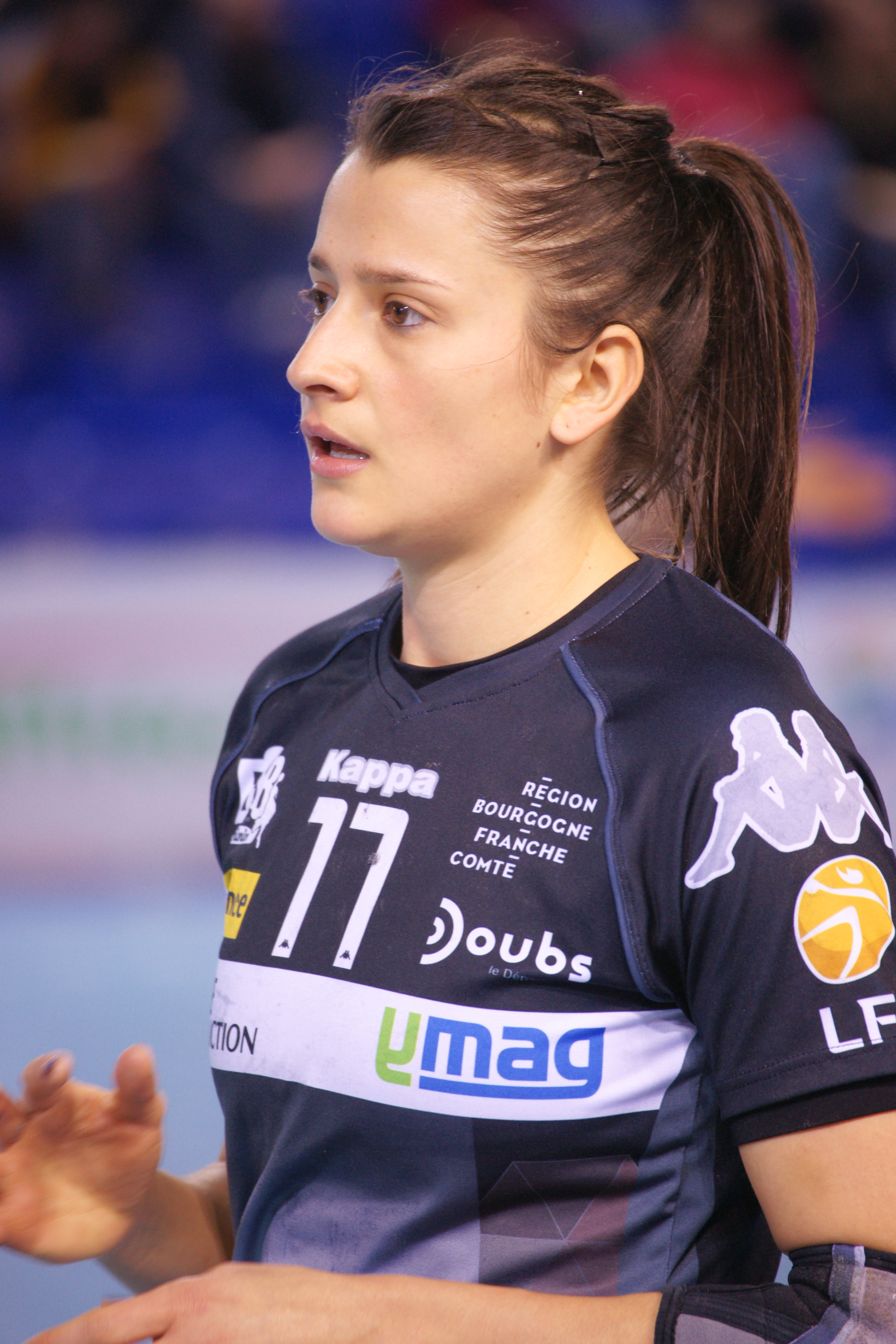
- Dupuis in 2018

Personal information
- Nationality: French
- Born: 18 April 1992 (age 34) Pontarlier, France
- Height: 1.67 m (5 ft 6 in)

Sport
- Sport: Handball
- Position: Left wing
- Current club: OGC Nice Côte d'Azur Handball
- Number: 17

Youth career
- Years: Team
- –: ESBF Besançon

Senior clubs
- Years: Team
- 1998–2020: ESBF Besançon
- 2020–2022: Toulon Saint-Cyr Var Handball
- 2022–2024: Nantes Atlantique Handball
- 2024–: OGC Nice Côte d'Azur Handball
National team
Years	Team	Apps	(Gls)
2024–	France	2	(3)
- Updated on 3 December 2024

Marine Dupuis (born 18 April 1992) is a French handball player for the Division 1 Feminine team OGC Nice Côte d'Azur Handball and the French national team.

== Career ==
Dupuis started playing handball in 1998 for ESBF Besançon. With the youth team she won the U-18 French championship twice. She then started playing in the 2nd team, which played in the National 1, the third tier of French handball.

In 2008 the Besançon first team was administratively relegated to the Division 2 Feminine due to financial trouble. Here Dupuis got the chance to start appearing for the first team. The club returned to Division 1 Feminine a season after.

In 2014 she signed a professional contract with the club.

After 21 years at the club she left in 2022 to join league rivals Toulon Saint-Cyr Var Handball. Then in 2022 she joined Nantes Atlantique Handball.

In 2024 she joined OGC Nice Côte d'Azur Handball.

== National team ==
At the 2012 U-20 World championship she won a silver medal with the French team.

At the age of 32 she debuted for the French senior team in a match against Hungary. She represented France at the 2024 European Women's Handball Championship. She was initially not part of the announced team, but entered when Coralie Lassource was injured.
