= Isabell Klein =

German handball player (born 1984)

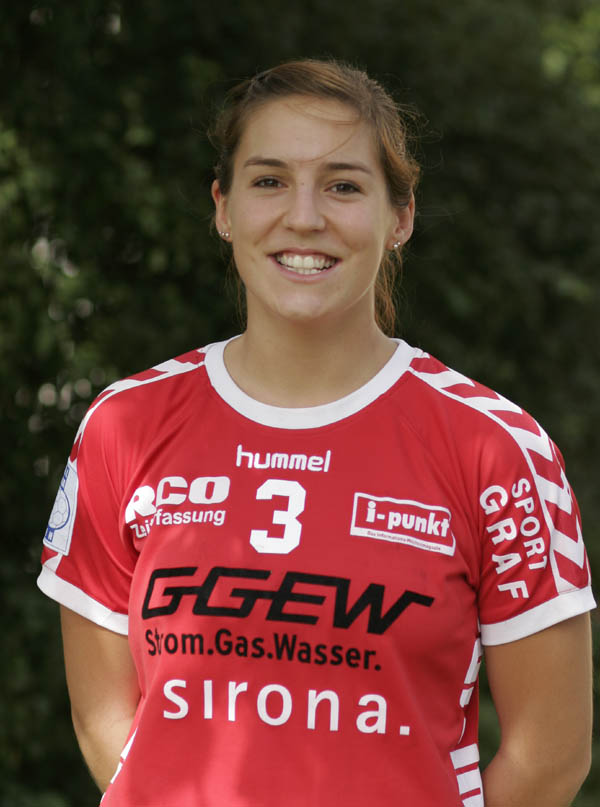

Personal information
- Nationality: German
- Born: 28 June 1984 (age 42) Oberschleißheim, Germany
- Height: 1.72 m (5 ft 8 in)

Sport
- Sport: Handball
- Position: Right back
- Current club: Nantes Handball
- Number: 3

Senior clubs
- Years: Team
- –: TSV Schleißheim
- –2003: TSV Ismaning
- 2003–2007: HSG Bensheim/Auerbach
- 2007–2016: Buxtehuder SV
- 2016–2018: Nantes Handball
National team
Years	Team	Apps	(Gls)
2008–2017	Germany	91	(102)

Isabell Klein (born 28 June 1984) née Isabell Nagel, is a German former handball player for Nantes Handball.

She participated in the 2011 World Women's Handball Championship in Brazil.

She is married to Dominik Klein, who plays handball for the French club HBC Nantes.
