= Marija Čolić =

Serbian handball player (born 1990)

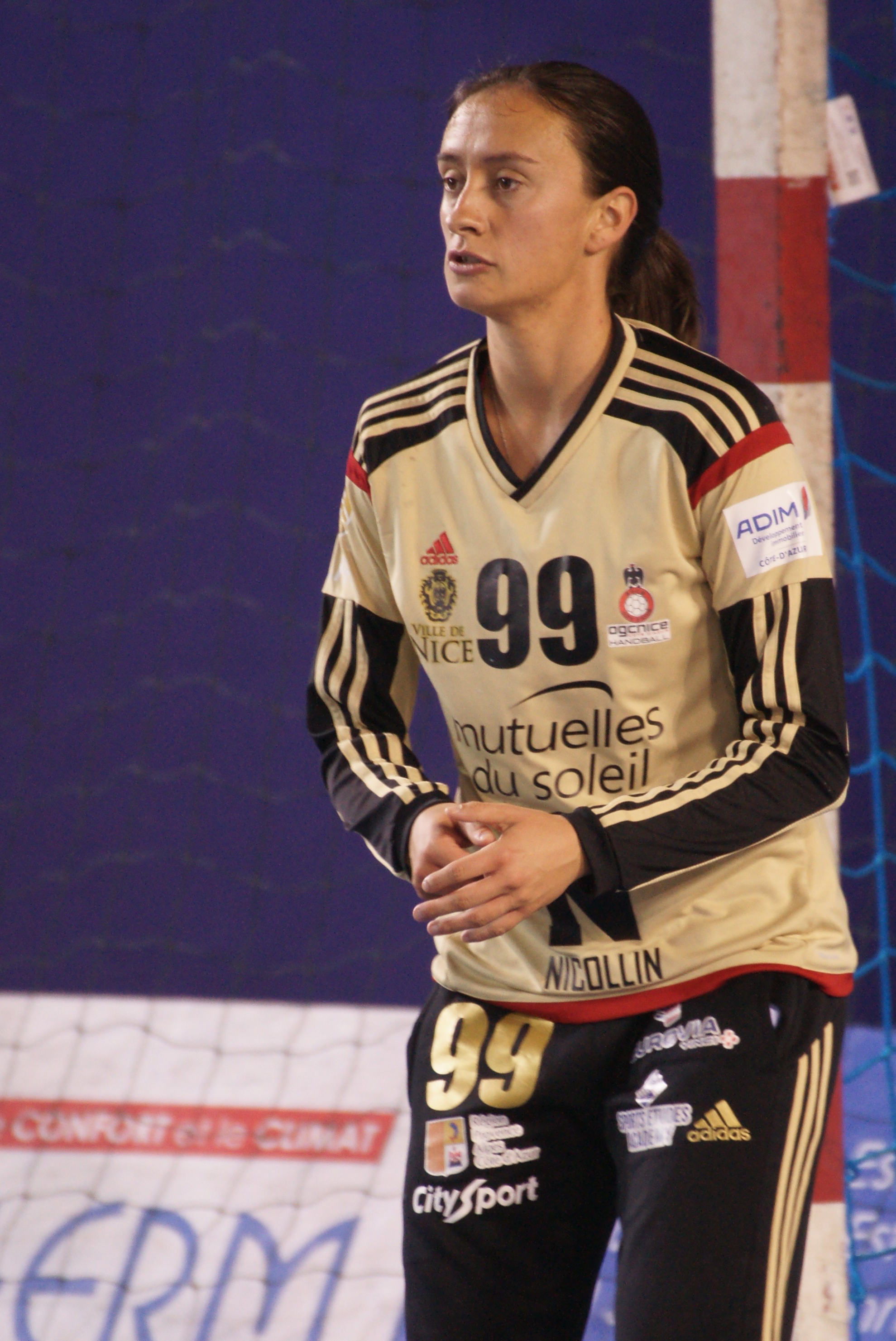
- Čolić in 2016

Personal information
- Nationality: Serbian
- Born: 12 April 1990 (age 36) Prokuplje, SR Serbia, SFR Yugoslavia
- Height: 1.73 m (5 ft 8 in)

Sport
- Sport: Handball
- Position: Goalkeeper
- Current club: Nice Handball
- Number: 98

Senior clubs
- Years: Team
- 2014: RK Crvena zvezda
- 2014-2016: HBC Nimes
- 2016-: Nice Handball
National team
Years	Team	Apps	(Gls)
–	Serbia	31	(1)

Marija Colic (born 12 April 1990) is a Serbian handball player for Nice Handball and the Serbian national team.

She was part of the team at the 2016 European Women's Handball Championship.
