= Aïssatou Kouyaté =

French handball player (born 1995)

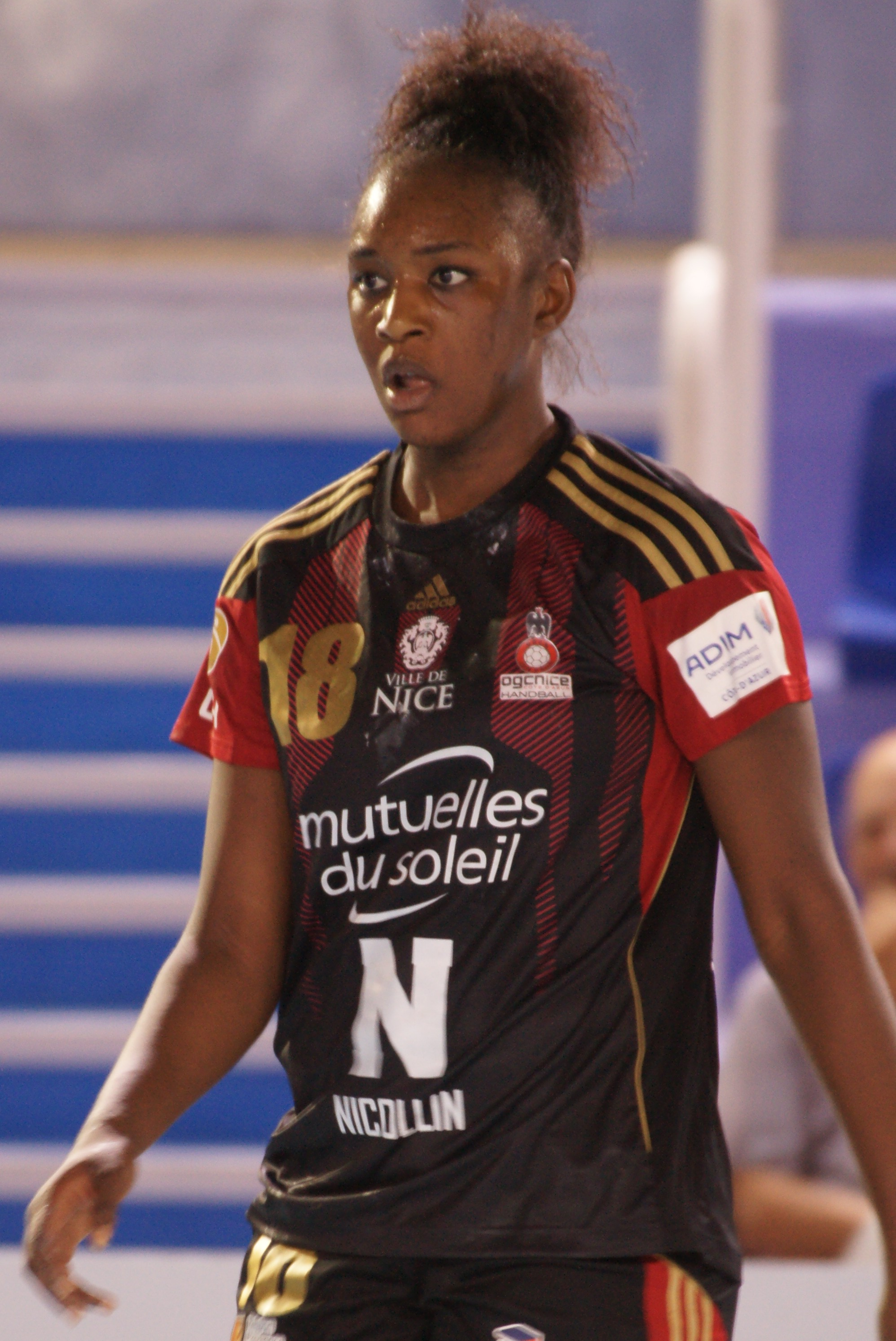

Personal information
- Nationality: French
- Born: 19 April 1995 (age 31) Clichy, France
- Height: 1.83 m (6 ft 0 in)

Sport
- Sport: Handball
- Position: Right back
- Current club: RK Podravka Koprivnica
- Number: 19

Youth career
- Years: Team
- –: MSD Chartres
- –2014: Fleury Loiret Handball

Senior clubs
- Years: Team
- 2014–2017: OGC Nice
- 2017–2021: ES Besançon
- 2021–2024: Brest Bretagne Handball
- 2024–2026: Rapid București
- 2026–: RK Podravka Koprivnica
National team
Years	Team	Apps	(Gls)
2018–	France	16	(25)
Medal record
European Championship
Silver medal – second place	2020 Denmark

Aïssatou Kouyaté (born 19 April 1995) is a French female handball player who plays for Croatian club RK Podravka Koprivnica and the French national team as a right back.

== Career ==
=== Youth career ===
Kouyaté started playing handball at MSD Chartres, before joining Fleury Loiret Handball. In 2014 she joined OGC Nice. After a year she signed her first professional contract with the club.

She made her debut for the French national team on 23 March 2019 against Denmark.

=== Besançon ===
In 2017 she joined ES Besançon to replace the injured Anna Manaut.

She represented France at the 2020 European Women's Handball Championship, where France won silver medals, losing to Norway in the final.

=== Brest Bretagne ===
In 2021 she joined Brest Bretagne Handball. In April 2021, she suffered from an anterior cruciate ligament (ACL) injury on her left knee which made her forfeit the 2020 Summer Olympics.

About a year later in February 2022, she suffered an injury on the same knee during a Champions league match. She had recently come back on the pitch after physical therapy.

=== Budućnost Podgorica ===
In 2024 she signed for Montenegrin side ŽRK Budućnost Podgorica. But because of the club's instable financials she decided to play for Romanian club Rapid București instead.

== Achievements ==
=== Club ===
==== Domestic ====
- French league (Division 1 Féminine):
  - Runner up: 2022 (with Brest Bretagne Handball)
  - 3rd: 2021 (with ES Besançon)
- French Women's League Cup Championship (Coupe de la Ligue):
  - Finalist: 2016 (with OGC Nice HB)

=== National team ===
- European Championship
  - 2020: Silver
- Junior World Championship
  - 2014: 5th
