= Ehsan Abdelmalek =

Egyptian handball player

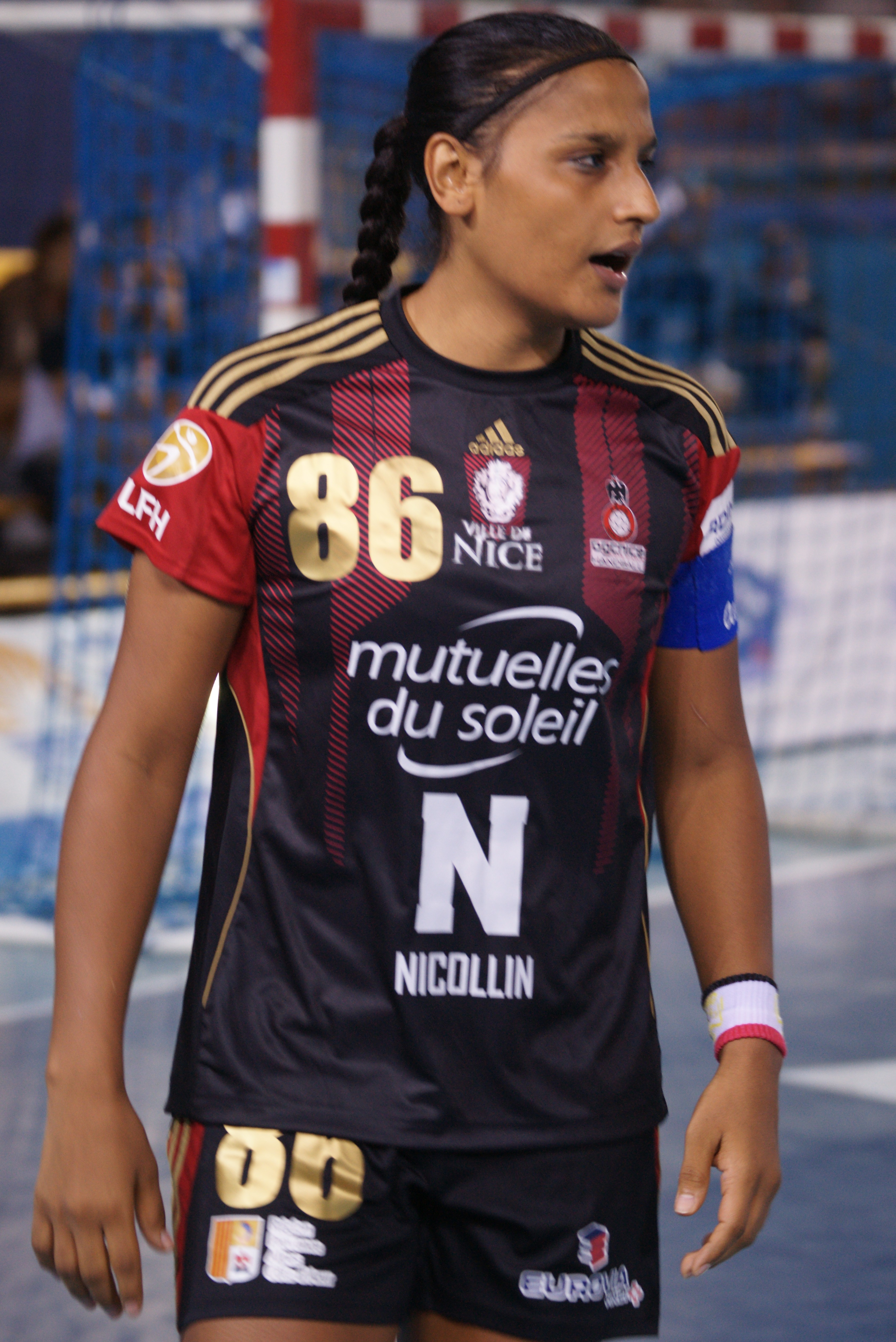
- Abdelmalek in 2016

Personal information
- Nationality: Egyptian
- Born: 27 November 1986 (age 39) Sayyidah Zainab, Cairo, Egypt
- Height: 1.72 m (5 ft 8 in)

Sport
- Sport: Handball
- Position: Central back / Left back
- Current club: Nice Handball
- Number: 86

Senior clubs
- Years: Team
- 1996–2010: Al Ahly
- 2010–2015: Aunis Handball
- 2015–: Nice Handball
National team
Years	Team	Apps	(Gls)
2003–	Egypt	24	(75)
- Updated on 27 November 2025

Ehsan Eid Abdelmalek (Arabic: إحسان عيد عبد الملك; born 27 November 1986), also known as Marwa Eid Abdelmalek, is an Egyptian female handball player who plays for Nice Handball and the Egypt national team.

== Club career ==
Abdelmalek, born in the Sayyidah Zainab District of Cairo, began her sports journey at the Zeinhum Youth Center at the age of five. She initially played football at Wadi Degla, where she became the top scorer in youth leagues for three consecutive seasons. In 1996, she shifted to handball, joining Al Ahly Handball, following the path of her older sister Hanan, who was the club's captain. Over her 14-year career with Al Ahly, she dominated the domestic scene, securing numerous trophies and becoming the league's top scorer seven times.

Before moving to France, Abdelmalek had a trial with Lüneburg Handball in Germany. However, the move fell through due to disagreements on financial terms. She then joined French club Aunis Handball in 2010, where she became the top scorer in the second division during the 2014–15 season. She later signed with Nice Handball in 2015.

== International career ==
Abdelmalek represented Egypt at the 2004 African Handball Championship, held on home soil, where she was among the tournament's top scorers and earned the title of best left back.

== Honours ==
Club

Al Ahly

- Egyptian Handball League:
  - Champion: 1996–97, 1997–98, 1998–99, 1999–00, 2000–01, 2001–02, 2002–03, 2003–04, 2004–05, 2005–06, 2006–07, 2007–08, 2008–09, 2009–10
- Egyptian Handball Cup:
  - Champion: 1997–98, 1999–00, 2000–01, 2001–02, 2002–03, 2003–04, 2004–05, 2005–06, 2006–07, 2007–08, 2008–09, 2009–10

Nice

- Coupe de la Ligue:
  - Finalist: 2016
- LFH Division 1:
  - Runner-up: 2019
