= Tamara Horacek =

French handball player (born 1995)

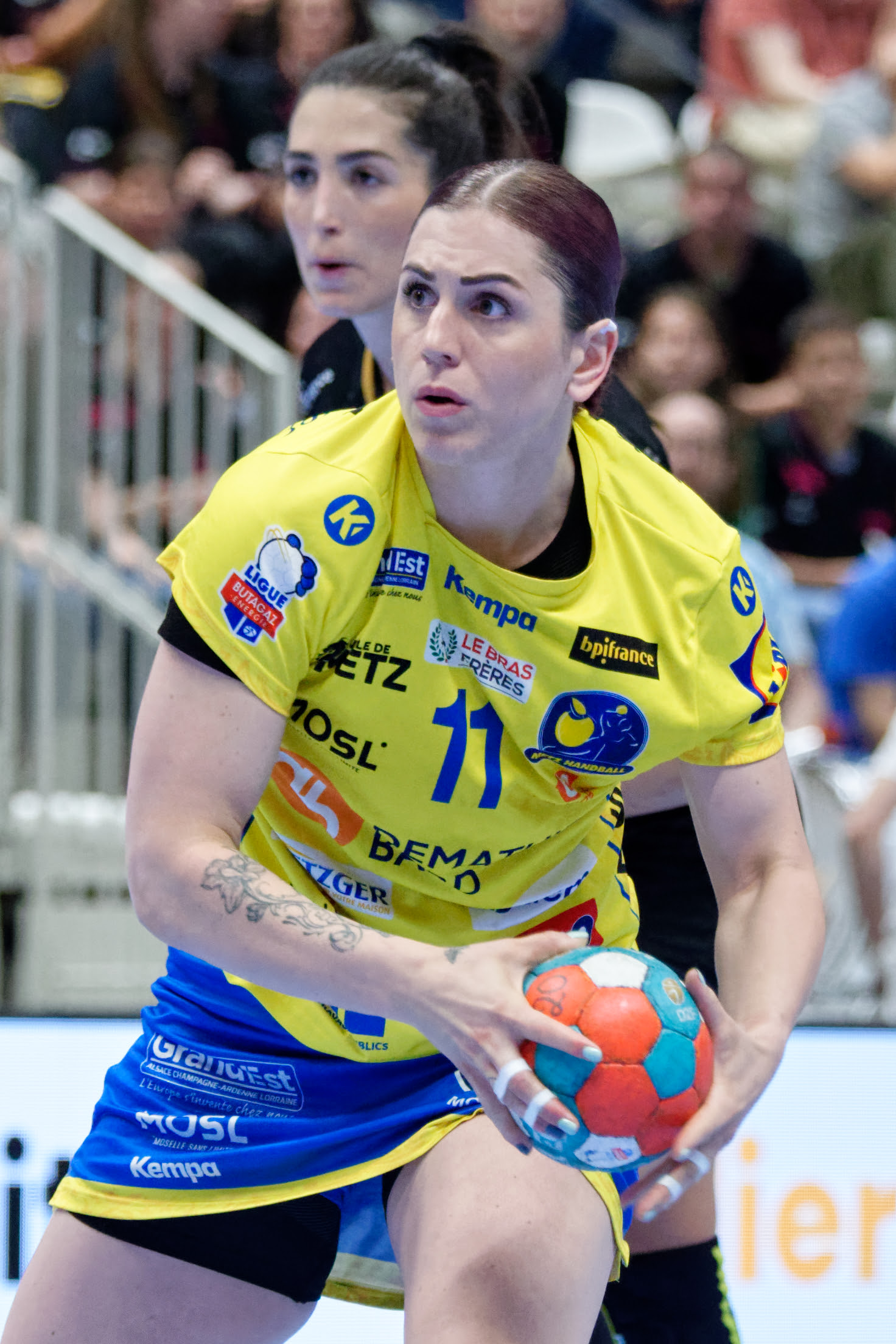
- Horacek in 2022

Personal information
- Nationality: French
- Born: 5 November 1995 (age 31) Požega, Croatia
- Height: 1.78 m (5 ft 10 in)

Sport
- Sport: Handball
- Position: Left back
- Current club: Brest Bretagne Handball
- Number: 22

Senior clubs
- Years: Team
- 2013–2017: Metz Handball
- 2017–2020: Paris 92
- 2020–2021: Siófok KC
- 2021–2023: Metz Handball
- 2023–2024: Neptunes de Nantes
- 2024–2026: RK Krim
- 2026-: Brest Bretagne Handball
National team
| Years | Team | Apps | (Gls) |
| 2016– | France | 130 | (275) |
Medal record
Olympic Games
| Silver medal – second place | 2016 Rio de Janeiro | Team |
| Silver medal – second place | 2024 Paris | Team |
World Championship
| Gold medal – first place | 2023 Denmark/Norway/Sweden |
| Silver medal – second place | 2021 Spain |
| Bronze medal – third place | 2025 Germany/Netherlands |
European Championship
| Bronze medal – third place | 2016 Sweden |
- Updated on 17 December 2025

Tamara Horacek (born Horaček; 5 November 1995) is a Croatian-born French handball player for Brest Bretagne Handball.

With the French national team she won a gold medal at the 2023 World Championship, two silver medals at the 2016 Olympic games and at the 2021 World Championship and a bronze medal at the 2016 European Women's Handball Championship.

== Club career ==
Horacek made her senior debut at the age of 17 in the 2013–14 season for Metz Handball and won the French championship and cup in her first senior season. In 2015–16 she won her second league title, playing 10 matches and scoring 5 goals.

In 2017 she joined Paris 92. In 2020 she joined Siófok KC. A year later she returned to Metz Handball. Here she won the 2022 and 2023 league and cup doubles.

In 2023 she joined Neptunes de Nantes. A year later she joined RK Krim, where she stayed for two season. In 2025 it was announced that Horacek signed a 2-year contract with Brest Bretagne Handball starting from July 2026.

== International career ==
Horacek made her debut for the French national team in a qualification matchforthe 2016 European Women's Handball Championship 30-26 win against Iceland. Horacek scored two goals in the match.

At the 2016 Olympics she was named as a French reserved. She entered the tournament in the semifinals to replace the injured Chloé Bulleux. She won silver medals with the French team, when they lost to Russia 19-22 in the final.

At the 2016 European Championship she was a part of the team from the start. After losing to Norway in the Semifinals and beating Denmark in the third place play-off she won a bronze medal.

At the 2021 World Championship she won silver medals. Two years later she won the title at the 2023 World Championship.

At the 2024 Olympics she won silver medals.

For the 2025 World Championship she won bronze medals losing to Germany in the semifinal and beating Netherlands in extra time in the third place playoff.

== Personal life ==
Her mother is Vesna Horaček, former Croatian international right back player.

== Achievements ==
=== Club ===
- EHF European League:
  - Runner up: 2021 (with Siófok KC)
- French league:
  - Winner: 2014, 2016, 2017, 2022 (with Metz Handball)
- French Cup (Coupe de France):
  - Winner: 2017, 2022 (with Metz Handball)

=== National team ===
- Olympic Games:
  - 2016: Silver
- World Championship:
  - 2021: Silver
  - 2023: Gold
- European Championship:
  - 2016: Bronze
- Junior World Championship:
  - 2014: 5th
