= Dmitry Garanin =

American physicist

Dmitry A. Garanin
- Born: Moscow, Russia
- Citizenship: Germany
- Education: MIPT (B.S., M.S.); Moscow State University (Ph.D.)
- Known for: Condensed matter physics
- Awards: Fellow of the American Physical Society
- Scientific career
- Fields: Physics
- Workplaces: CUNY Graduate Center
- Thesis: "Normal modes and relaxation processes in magnetically ordered materials with single-site anisotropy" (1985)

Dmitry Garanin in 2009

Dmitry Garanin reading poetry at the New York Writers' Union in 2016

Dmitry Garanin (Russian: Дмитрий Гаранин) is a Russian-American physicist known for his work in theoretical condensed matter physics. He is a professor in the Department of Physics & Astronomy at Lehman College of The City University of New York and a faculty member in the physics department of the CUNY Graduate Center. Dmitry Garanin is writing poetry, mainly in Russian.

== Career ==
Garanin attended the Moscow Institute of Physics and Technology from 1972 to 1978, graduating with a B.S. and M.S. in physics. He obtained his Ph.D. in physics from Moscow State University in 1985. Garanin worked in the I. E. Tamm Division of Theoretical Physics of the Lebedev Physical Institute in Moscow, then at the Moscow Technological University (MIREA). In 1992 he emigrated to Germany with his family, where he worked at the University of Hamburg, the Max Planck Institute for the Physics of Complex Systems in Dresden, and at the University of Mainz. In 2005, he became an associate professor at the Department of Physics & Astronomy, Lehman College and a member of the doctoral faculty of the CUNY Graduate Center. He was promoted to full professor in 2013. Garanin has authored or coauthored over 150 research papers in the field of Solid-State Physics / Magnetism.

== Awards and honors ==
In 2013, Garanin became a Fellow of the American Physical Society.

== Selected publications ==
- Garanin, Dmitry A. "Pulse-noise approach for classical spin systems" Phys. Rev. E 95, 013306-(8) (2017). PhysRevE.95.013306
- Garanin, Dmitry A. "Uniform and nonuniform thermal switching of magnetic particles" Phys. Rev. B 98, 144425-(12) (2018). PhysRevB.98.144425
- Chudnovsky, Eugene M.; Garanin, Dmitry A. "Topological Order Generated by a Random Field in a 2D Exchange Model" Phys. Rev. Lett. 121, 017201-(5) (2018). PhysRevLett.121.017201
- Garanin, Dmitry A.; Jaafar, Reem; Chudnovsky, Eugene M. "Breathing mode of a skyrmion on a lattice" Phys. Rev. B 101, 014418-(11) (2020). PhysRevB.101.014418
