= OGC Nice Côte d'Azur Handball =

French handball club

- Full name: OGC Nice Côte d'Azur Handball
- Founded: 2011
- Arena: Sports Hall Charles-Ehrmann, Nice
- Capacity: 1,450
- President: Ange Ferracci
- Head coach: Sébastien Mizoule
- League: French Women's First League
- 2024–25: 6th
- Club colours
Home	Away

OGC Nice Côte d'Azur Handball is a French handball club from Nice. This team currently competes in the French Women's Handball First League from 2012.

== History ==
Founded in 2006 the club was promoted to the second division in 2008 and to the top flight in 2013.

In the 2017-18 season, the club finished 2nd in the French Women's First League, after losing the two finals against Metz Handball. They defeated Brest Bretagne Handball in the semifinals. The Finalist team included several international stars such as Linnea Torstenson, Carmen Martín and Jane Schumacher.

== Results ==
- LFH Division 2 Féminine
  - Wnner: 2012-13
- French Championship:
  - Runners-up (1): 2019
- French League Cup:
  - Runner-up (1): 2016

== Team ==
=== Current squad ===
Squad for the 2025-26 season.

Goalkeepers

- 72 (France) Cecilie Errin
- 99 (Serbia) Marija Čolić

Wingers
LW

- 5 (Senegal) Dienaba Sy
- 17 (France) Marine Dupuis

RW

- 70 (France) Margot Le Blevec

Line players

- 15 (France) Opélia Ondono
- 31 (Senegal) Marie Fall
- 34 (France) Louna Benezeth

Back players
LB

- 22 (Sweden) Hanna Åhlén
- 66 (France) Wendy Semedo

CB

- 19 (France) Marnie Valette
- 55 (Denmark) Julie Pontoppidan
- 86 (Egypt) Ehsan Abdelmalek

RB

- 25 (France) Marie-Hélène Sajka

=== Transfers ===
Transfers for the 2026–27 season

Joining

- (France) Manon Gravelle (RB) (from (France) La Roche sur Yon Vendée)

Leaving

- (France) Marie-Hélène Sajka (RB) (to (Romania) SCM Râmnicu Vâlcea)

=== Technical staff ===
Staff for the 2025–26 season

- (France) Head coach: Sébastien Mizoule
- (France) Assistant coach: Bruno Helmrich
- (France) Physiotherapist: Clement Heller
- (France) Physical coach: Erwan Roudaut
- (France) Chef de Délégation: Claude Mirtillio

=== Notable former players ===
- (Spain) Carmen Martín
- (Spain) Elisabeth Chávez
- (Spain) Ana Martínez
- (Spain) Beatriz Escribano
- (Iceland) Karen Knútsdóttir
- (Iceland) Arna Sif Pálsdóttir
- (Sweden) Linnea Torstenson
- (Sweden) Cecilia Grubbström
- (Serbia) Biljana Filipović
- (Serbia) Marija Čolić
- (Denmark) Jane Schumacher
- (Brazil) Samira Rocha
- (Tunisia) Takoua Chabchoub
- (Hungary) Ágnes Hornyák
- (Croatia) Maida Arslanagić
- (France) Aïssatou Kouyaté
- (France) Alexandra Lacrabère
- (France) Cléopâtre Darleux
- (France) Nodjialem Myaro
- (France) Béatrice Edwige
- (France) Valérie Nicolas

== Coaching history ==
- (France) Franck Bulleux: 2008-2011
- (France) Carine Bertrand: 2011-2012
- (France) Sébastien Gardillou: 2012-2016
- (North Macedonia) Marjan Kolev: 2016-2022
- (France) Clément Alcacer: 2022-
