= Ekaterina Zelenkova =

Russian handball player

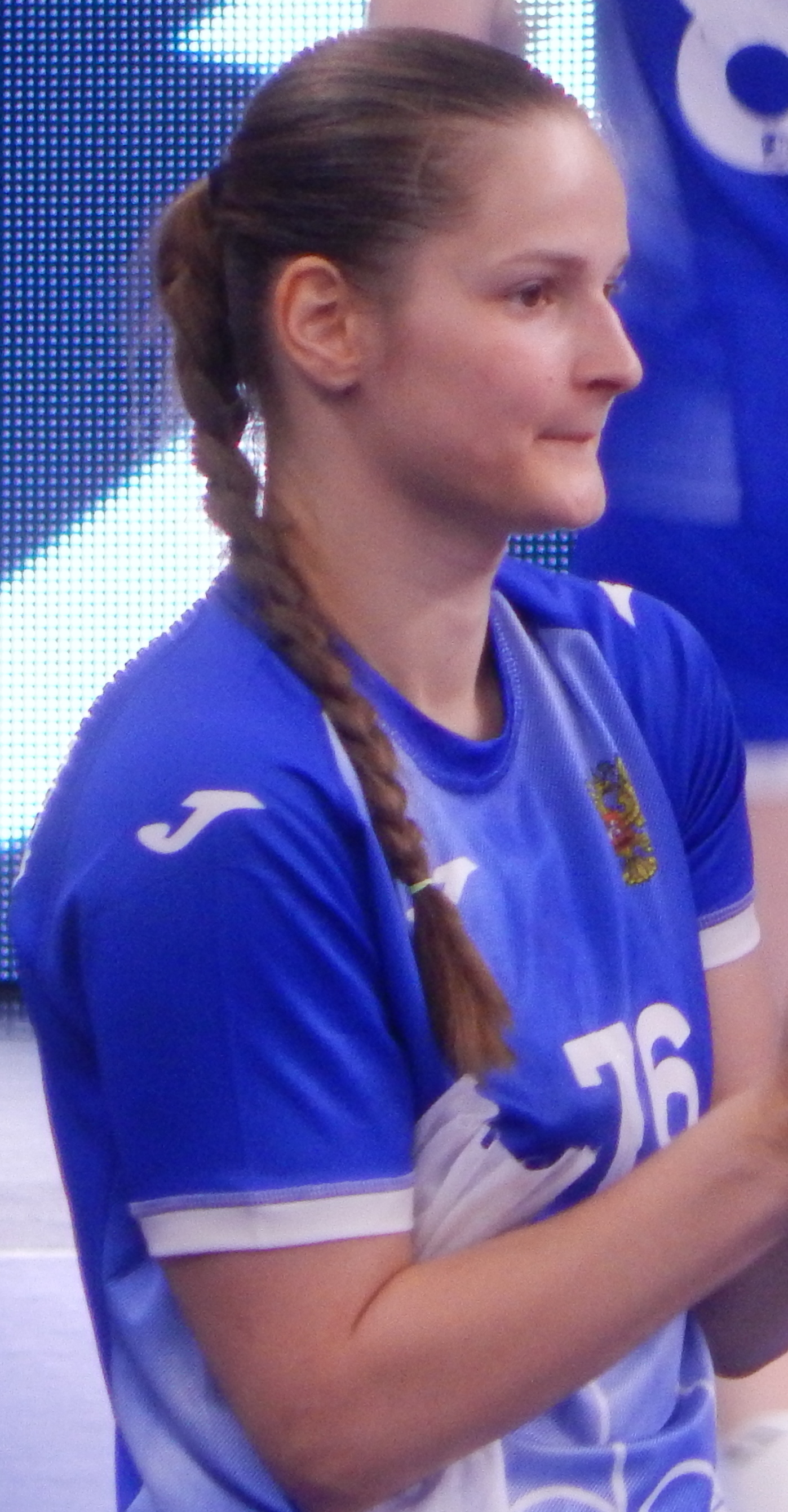

Personal information
- Nationality: Russian
- Born: 28 February 1999 (age 27) Yaroslavl, Russia
- Height: 1.85 m (6 ft 1 in)

Sport
- Sport: Handball
- Position: Right back
- Current club: Rostov-Don
- Number: 76

Senior clubs
- Years: Team
- 2015–2021: HC Astrakhanochka
- 2021–: Rostov-Don
National team
Years	Team	Apps	(Gls)
2021–	Russia	2	(3)

Ekaterina Zelenkova (Russian: Екатерина Зеленкова; born 28 February 1999) is a Russian female handballer for Rostov-Don and the Russian national team.

She participated at the 2021 World Women's Handball Championship in Spain.
