= Veronika Nikitina =

Russian handball player (born 1992)

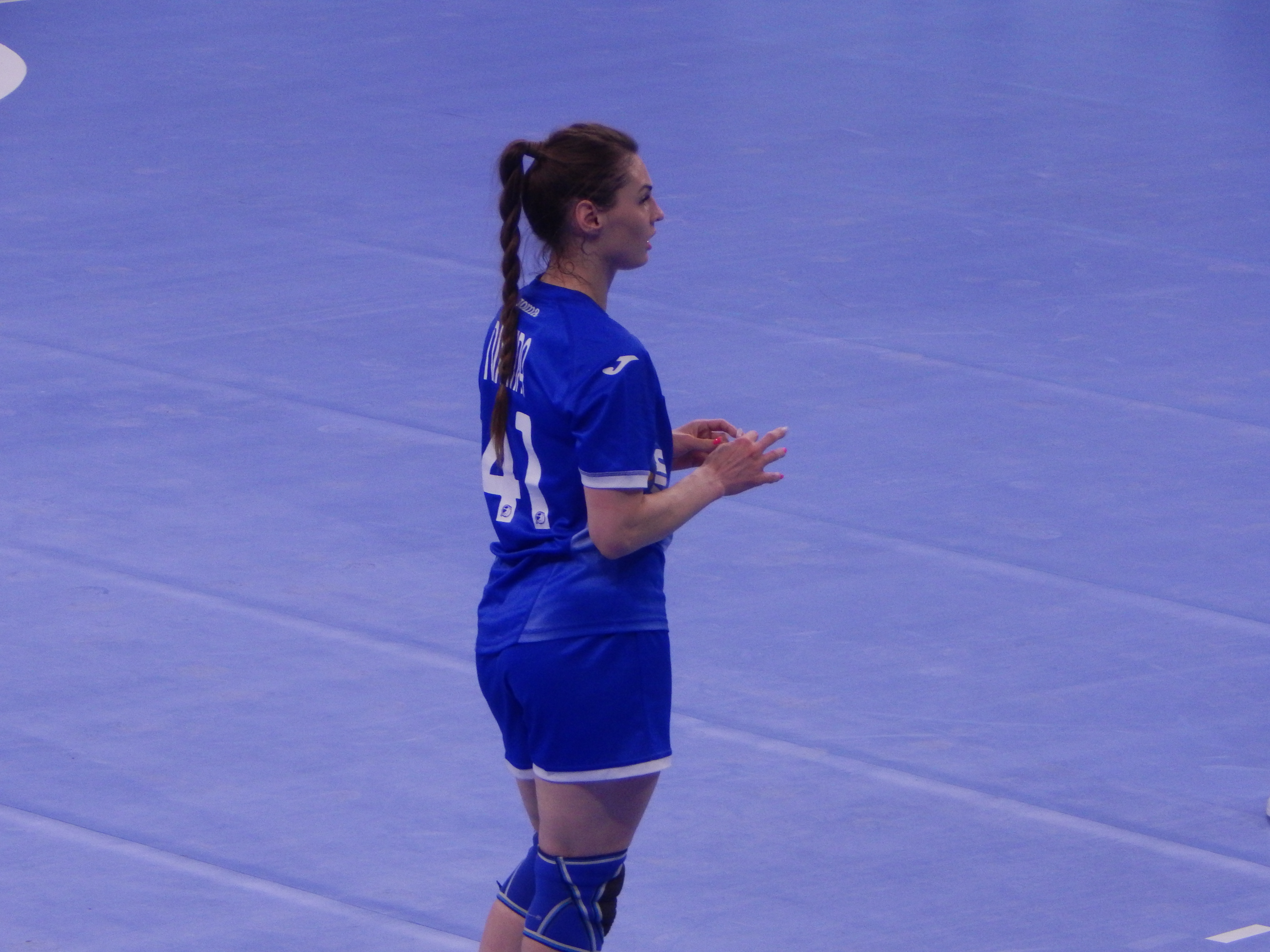

Personal information
- Full name: Veronika Vladimirovna Nikitina
- Nationality: Russian
- Born: 16 May 1992 (age 34) Tolyatti, Russia
- Height: 1.75 m (5 ft 9 in)

Sport
- Sport: Handball
- Position: Left back
- Current club: HC CSKA Moscow
- Number: 14

Senior clubs
- Years: Team
- 2009–2024: Handball Club Lada
- 2024–: HC CSKA Moscow
National team
Years	Team	Apps	(Gls)
2015–	Russia	13	(19)
- Updated on 19 August 2024

Veronika Vladimirovna Nikitina (Russian: Вероника Владимировна Никитина (Гаранина; born Veronika Garanina 16 May 1992) is a Russian female handballer for HC CSKA Moscow and the Russian national team.

She participated at the 2021 World Championship in Spain.
