= Maria Kanaval =

Belarusian handball player

Maryia Skrobic
Personal information
- Nationality: Belarusian, Romanian
- Born: 19 March 1997 (age 29) Rahachow, Belarus
- Height: 1.85 m (6 ft 1 in)

Sport
- Sport: Handball
- Position: Left back
- Current club: CS Rapid

Senior clubs
- Years: Team
- 2014–2020: BNTU-BelAZ Minsk Region
- 2020–2025: Dunărea Brăila
- 2025-: CS Rapid
National team
- Years: Team
- 2016–2024: Belarus
- 2024-: Romania

Maryia Skrobic (née Kanaval; born 19 March 1997) is a Belarusian handballer who plays as a left back for CS Rapid and the Romania national team.

== Achievements ==
- Belarusian Championship:
  - Winner: 2015, 2018
  - Silver Medalist: 2016, 2017, 2019, 2020

== Achievements ==
- All-Star Left Back of the Belarusian Championship: 2020
