= Marina Dmitrović =

Serbian handball player (born 1985)

Personal information
- Nationality: Serbian
- Born: 23 March 1985 (age 41) Belgrade, SR Serbia, SFR Yugoslavia
- Height: 1.85 m (6 ft 1 in)

Sport
- Sport: Handball
- Position: Right back
- Current club: Dunărea Brăila

Senior clubs
- Years: Team
- 2010–2012: ŽORK Jagodina
- 2012–2014: HC Vardar
- 2014–2015: Ankara Yenimahalle
- 2015–2016: CSM Ploiești
- 2016–2018: Kisvárdai KC
- 2018–2019: Corona Brașov
- 2019–: Dunărea Brăila
National team
Years	Team	Apps	(Gls)
–	Serbia	105	(170)
Medal record
World Championship
Silver medal – second place	2013 Serbia

Marina Dmitrović (born 23 March 1985) is a Serbian handballer for Dunărea Brăila.

She was part of the Serbian team that won a silver medal at the 2013 World Women's Handball Championship, which is Serbia's best result ever.

== International honours ==
- EHF Champions League:
  - Bronze Medalist: 2014
- World Championship:
  - Finalist: 2013
