= Aneta Udriștioiu =

Romanian handball player (born 1989)

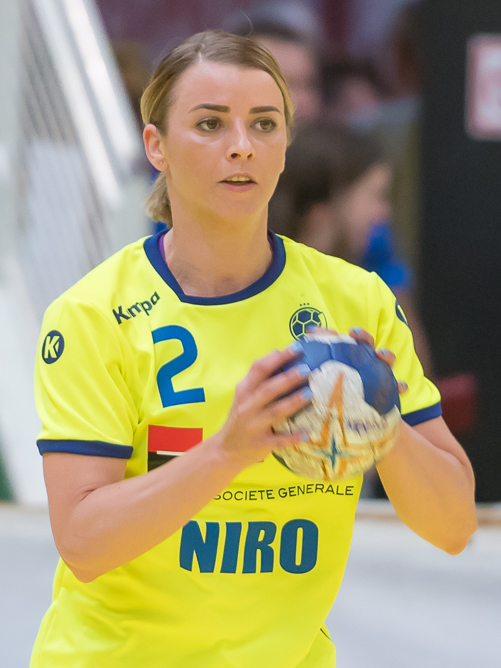

Personal information
- Nationality: Romanian
- Born: 22 June 1989 (age 37) Drobeta-Turnu Severin, Romania
- Height: 1.65 m (5 ft 5 in)

Sport
- Sport: Handball
- Position: Right wing

Youth career
- Years: Team
- –: CSŞ Drobeta-Turnu Severin

Senior clubs
- Years: Team
- –2009: HC Drobeta-Turnu Severin
- 2009–2015: HCM Baia Mare
- 2014–2015: → SCM Craiova (loan)
- 2015–2017: Dunărea Brăila
- 2017–2019: CSM București
- 2019–2024: Dunărea Brăila
National team
Years	Team	Apps	(Gls)
2012–	Romania	63	(71)

Aneta Udriștioiu (née Pîrvuț; born 22 June 1989) is a retired Romanian handball player.

== International honours ==
- EHF Champions League:
  - Bronze Medalist: 2018
- Youth European Championship:
  - Silver Medalist: 2005
- Youth World Championship:
  - Bronze Medalist: 2006
- Junior European Championship:
  - Bronze Medalist: 2007
