= Pauline Coatanea =

French handball player (born 1993)

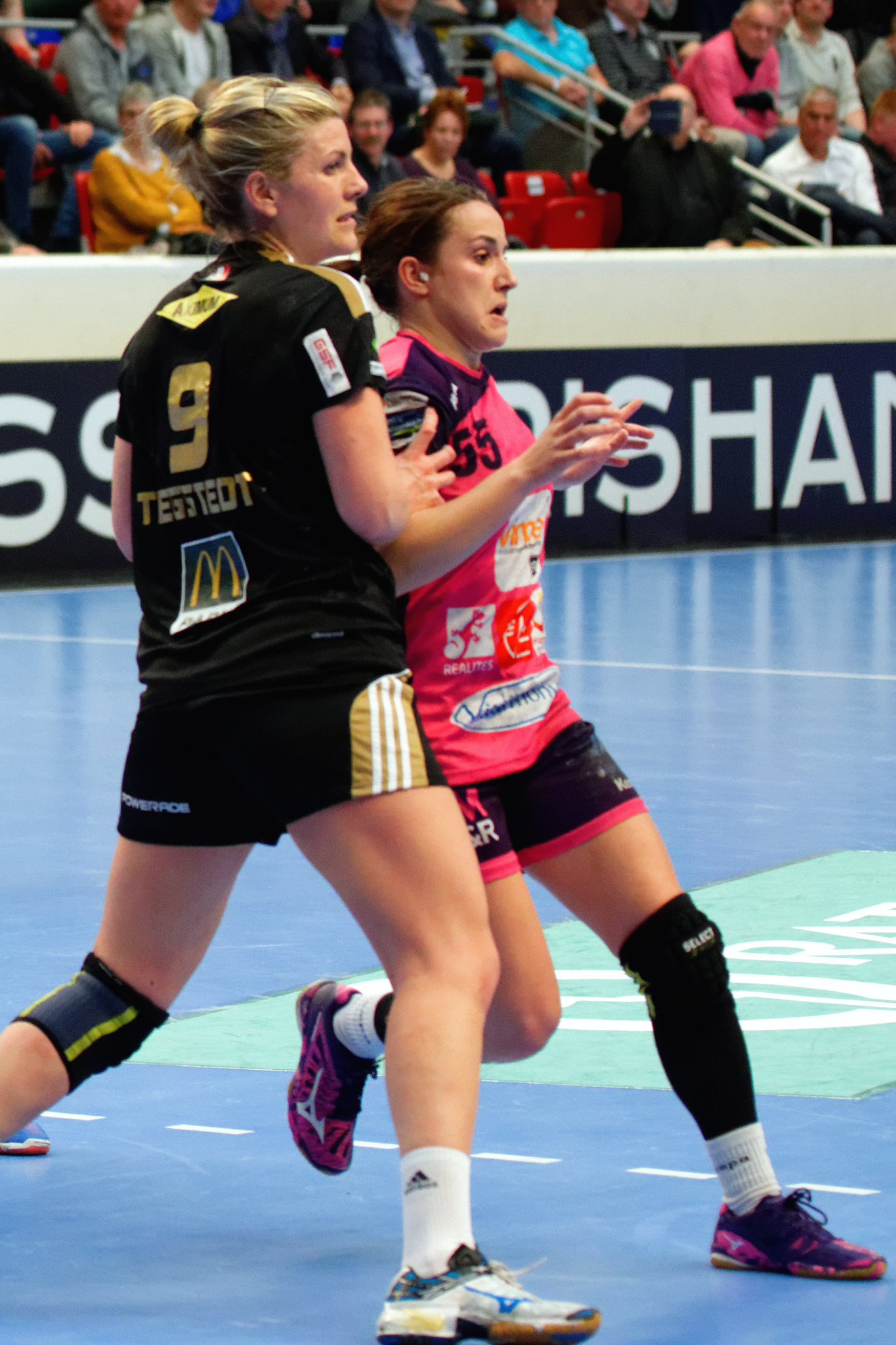
- Coatanea in 2016

Personal information
- Nationality: French
- Born: 6 July 1993 (age 33) Saint-Renan, France
- Height: 1.65 m (5 ft 5 in)

Sport
- Sport: Handball
- Position: Right wing
- Current club: Brest Bretagne HB
- Number: 55

Youth career
- Years: Team
- –: Locmaria Handball
- 2011-2012: Arvor 29

Senior clubs
- Years: Team
- 2011–2012: Arvor 29
- 2012–2017: Nantes Loire Atlantique HB
- 2017–: Brest Bretagne HB
National team
Years	Team	Apps	(Gls)
2017–	France	72	(127)
Medal record
Event	1st	2nd	3rd
Olympic Games	1	0	0
European Championship	1	1	0
Junior World Championship	0	1	0
Total	2	2	0
Women's Handball
Representing France
Olympic Games
Gold medal – first place	2020 Tokyo	Team
European Championship
Gold medal – first place	2018 France	
Silver medal – second place	2020 Denmark	
Junior World Championship
Silver medal – second place	2012 Czech Republic	
- Updated on 12 November 2024

Pauline Coatanea (born 6 July 1993) is a French handball player who plays for Brest Bretagne Handball and the French national team as a right wing.

== Career ==
Coatanea started playing handball aged 8 at Locmaria Handball, where she played together with Maud-Éva Copy. In 2011 she joined Arvor 29. Between 2010 and 2012 she played 6 senior matches in the League.

In 2012 she joined second league team Nantes Loire Atlantique Handball. She won the French second league 2013, and was promoted to the first league. In 2015-16 she played in the EHF Cup for the first time in club history, reaching the third round. In 2017 she rejoined Brest Bretagne HB. Here she won the 2018 and 2021 French Cup and the 2021 French championship.

=== National team ===
Coatanea debuted for the French national team on 16 March 2017 against Denmark. With the French team she won the 2018 European Championship on home soil. In the final against Russia, she scored one single goal.

A year later at the 2019 World Championship she and the French team disappointed by finished 13th.

At the 2020 European Championship she reached the final with the French team, losing to Norway.

At the 2020 Olympics she won gold medals with the French team. During the tournament she scored 20 goals.

== Achievements ==
=== Club ===
==== International ====
- EHF Champions League
  - Finalist: 2021 (with Brest Bretagne Handball)

==== Domestic ====
- French league:
  - Winner (gold) : 2021 (with Brest Bretagne Handball)
  - Runner up: 2022 (with Brest Bretagne Handball)
  - Tied 1st: 2020 (with Brest Bretagne Handball)
- French Cup (Coupe de France):
  - Winner (gold) : 2018 and 2021 (with Brest Bretagne Handball)
  - Runner up: 2019 (with Brest Bretagne Handball)
- French League Cup (Coupe de la Ligue):
  - Runner up: 2011 (with Arvor 29)
- French 2nd division league (Division 2 Féminine):
  - Winner (gold) : 2013 (with Nantes Loire Atlantique Handball)

=== National team ===
- Olympic Games
  - 2020: Gold
- European Championship
  - 2018: Gold
  - 2020: Silver
  - 2022: 4th
- Junior competitions
  - 10th at the European Women's U-19 Handball Championship in 2011
  - Silver at the IHF Women's Junior World Championship (U20) in 2012

== Individual awards ==
- All-Star Team Right Wing of the Junior World Championship: 2012
- Championnat de France:
  - Best Right Wing: 2018, 2020
  - 7 Majeur de la semaine (Best 7 Players of the week): Day 8 & 10 of Season 2018/19

== Honors ==
- Inducted into

the Legion of Honor with the rank of Chevalier: 2021
