= Astride N'Gouan =

French handball player (born 1991)

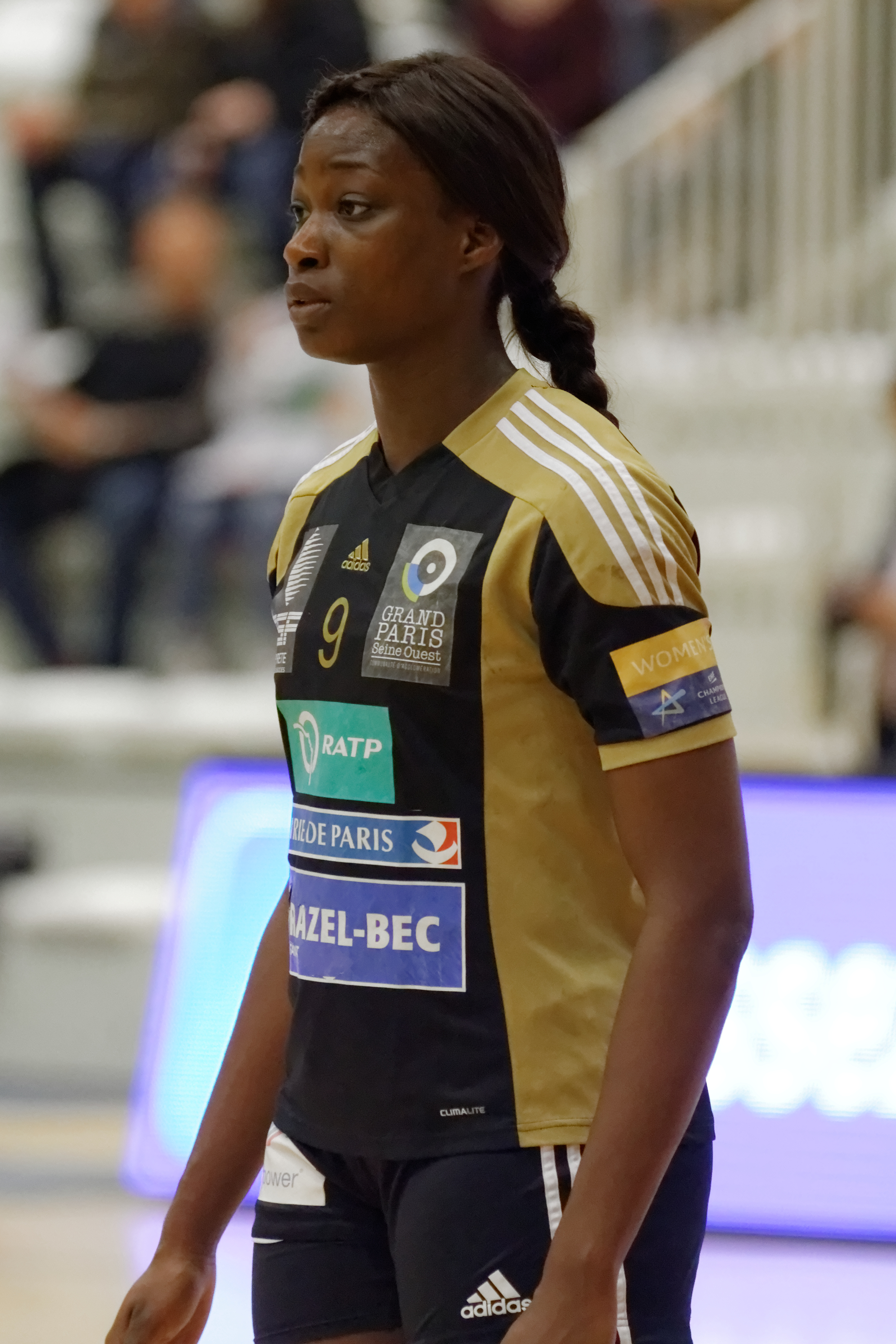

Personal information
- Full name: Adjoba Astride N'Gouan
- Nationality: French
- Born: 9 July 1991 (age 35) Saint-Denis, France
- Height: 1.87 m (6 ft 2 in)

Sport
- Sport: Handball
- Position: Pivot
- Current club: Paris 92
- Number: 9

Senior clubs
- Years: Team
- 2010–2014: Issy-Paris Hand
- 2014–2016: Toulon Saint-Cyr Var HB
- 2016–2018: Brest Bretagne HB
- 2018–2022: Metz Handball
- 2022–: Paris 92
National team
Years	Team	Apps	(Gls)
2013–	France	46	(45)
Medal record
World Championship
Gold medal – first place	2017 Germany
European Championship
Gold medal – first place	2018 France

Adjoba Astride N'Gouan (born 9 July 1991) is a French handballer for Paris 92 and the French national team. She is of Ivorian descent.

== Achievements ==
=== Club ===
- Championnat de France:
  - Gold Medalist: 2019 and 2022 (with Metz Handball)
  - Silver Medalist: 2012 and 2014 (with Issy Paris Hand); 2017 and 2018 (with Brest Bretagne Handball)
- Coupe de France:
  - Winner: 2018 (with Brest Bretagne Handball); 2019 and 2022 (with Metz Handball)
  - Finalist: 2014
- Coupe de la Ligue:
  - Winner: 2013 (with Issy Paris Hand)
- EHF Cup Winners' Cup:
  - Finalist: 2013 (with Issy Paris Hand);
- EHF Challenge Cup:
  - Finalist: 2014 (with Issy Paris Hand);
