= Kalidiatou Niakaté =

French handball player (born 1995)

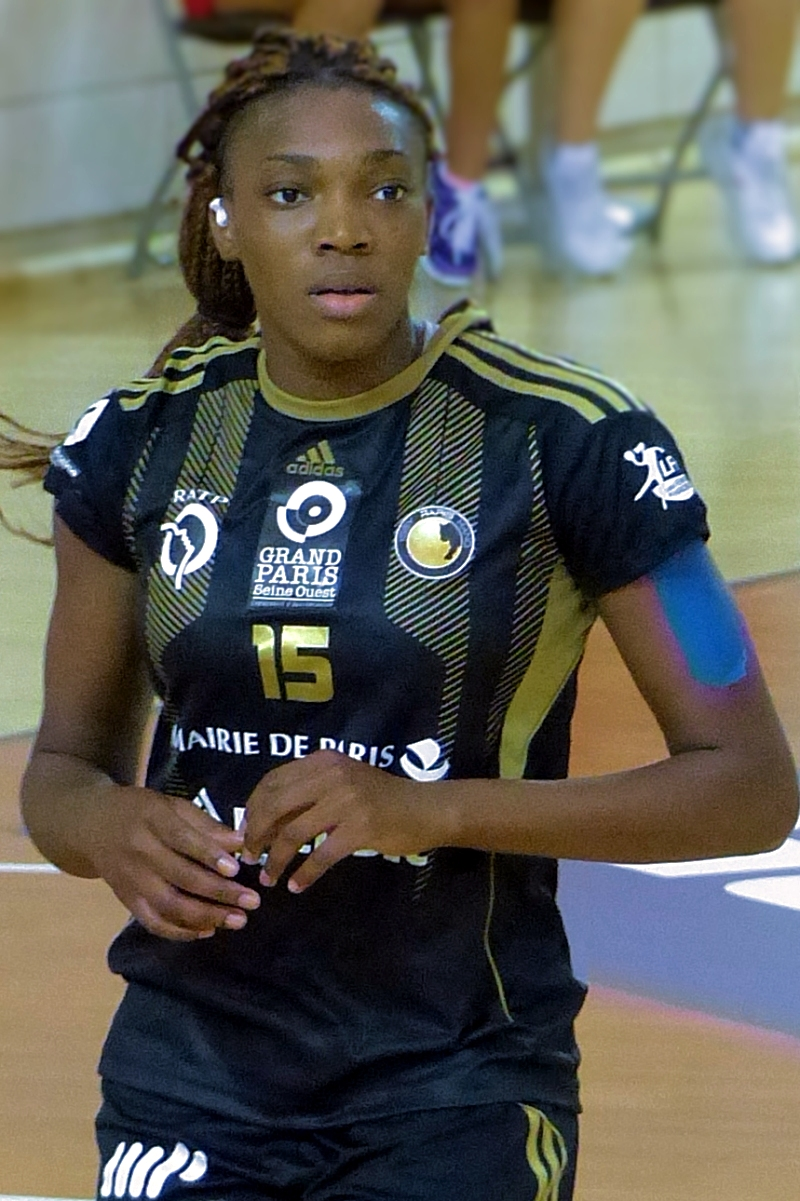
- Niakaté in 2014

Personal information
- Nationality: French
- Born: 15 March 1995 (age 31) Aubervilliers, France
- Height: 1.77 m (5 ft 10 in)

Sport
- Sport: Handball
- Position: Left back
- Current club: Zagłębie Lubin
- Number: 15

Youth career
- Years: Team
- –: Aubervilliers
- –2011: Châtenay-Malabry
- 2011–2014: Issy-Paris Hand

Senior clubs
- Years: Team
- 2014–2017: Issy-Paris Hand
- 2017–2019: Nantes Handball
- 2019–2022: Brest Bretagne Handball
- 2022–2023: CSM București
- 2023–2024: ŽRK Budućnost
- 2024: Neptunes de Nantes
- 2024–2025: Nykøbing Falster HK
- 2025–2026: Handball Erice
- 2026–: Zagłębie Lubin
National team
Years	Team	Apps	(Gls)
2014–2022	France	61	(78)
Medal record
Olympic Games
Gold medal – first place	2020 Tokyo	Team
World Championship
Gold medal – first place	2017 Germany
Silver medal – second place	2021 Spain
European Championship
Gold medal – first place	2018 France
Silver medal – second place	2020 Denmark

Kalidiatou Niakaté (born 15 March 1995) is a French handball player for Zagłębie Lubin and formerly the French national team.

== Career ==
Niakaté started playing handball at Aubervilliers followed by Châtenay-Malabry, before moving to Issy-Paris Hand in 2011.

While playing for Issy-Paris Hand, her team placed second at the 2012/13 Cup Winners' Cup and 2013/14 Challenge Cup. She also won the 2013 Coupe de la League and finished 2nd in the French league two years in a row in 2014 and 2015.

In 2017 she joined Nantes Atlantique Handball. In February 2019 she had to be operated in the Patellar tendon and was out for the rest of the season.

The following season she joined Brest Bretagne Handball. Here she won the 2021 French League and the Coupe de France.

In 2022 she joined Romanian team CSM București. In her single season at the club, she won the Romanian Championship and Cup double.

Afterwards she joined Montenegrin side ŽRK Budućnost. Here she also won the domestic double.

In 2024 she returned to France and rejoined Nantes. When Neptunes de Nantes declared bankruptcy, she joined Danish side Nykøbing Falster Håndboldklub.

=== National team ===
Niakaté made her debut for the French national team in October 2014.

In her first major tournament, she was part of the French team that won the 2017 World Championship. She scored 12 goals during the tournament.

In the following year she won gold medals at the 2018 European Championship. She did however only participate in the preliminary round.

At the 2020 European Championship, she won silver medals, losing to Norway in the final. She scored 15 goals during the tournament.

She was then part of the French team that won gold medals at the 2020 Olympics in Tokyo. She scored 8 goals during the tournament. The same year she won silver medals at the 2021 World Championship, once again losing to Norway in the final.
