= Alexandra Lacrabère =

French handball player (born 1987)

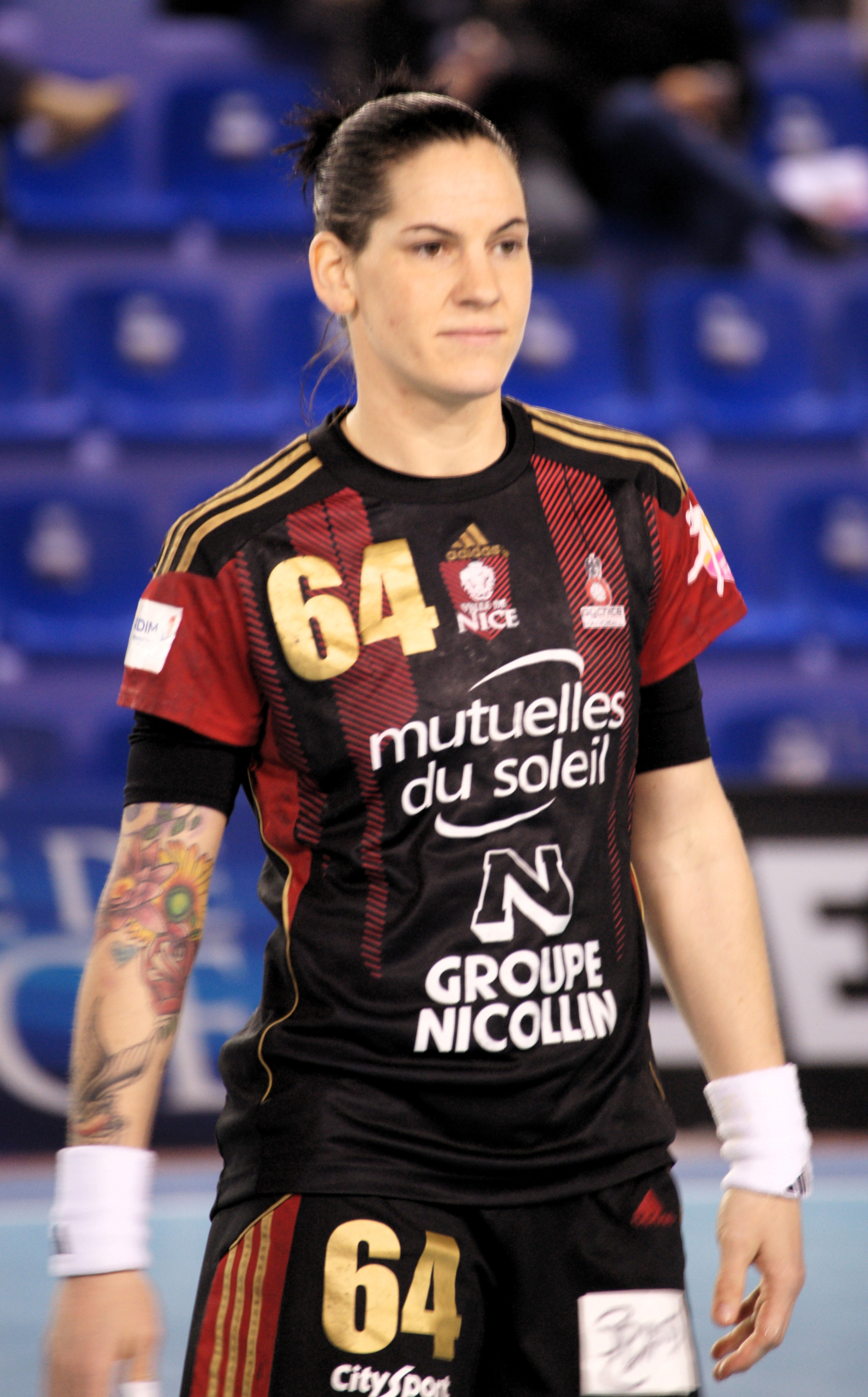
- Lacrabère in 2016

Personal information
- Full name: Alexandra Maïté Lacrabère
- Nationality: French
- Born: 27 April 1987 (age 39) Pau, France
- Height: 1.77 m (5 ft 10 in)

Sport
- Sport: Handball
- Position: Right back
- Current club: TMS Ringsted

Senior clubs
- Years: Team
- 2006–2008: CA Béglais
- 2008–2009: Akaba Bera Bera
- 2009–2010: Toulouse Féminin Handball
- 2010–2012: Arvor 29
- 2012–2013: Zvezda Zvenigorod
- 2013–2014: Mios-Biganos-Bègles
- 2014–2016: OGC Nice Côte d'Azur
- 2016–2018: ŽRK Vardar
- 2018–2021: Fleury Loiret HB
- 2021–2022: Chambray Touraine
- 2022: Rapid București
- 2024–: TMS Ringsted
National team
Years	Team	Apps	(Gls)
2006–2021	France	256	(833)
Medal record
Olympic Games
Gold medal – first place	2020 Tokyo	Team
Silver medal – second place	2016 Rio de Janeiro	Team
World Championship
Gold medal – first place	2017 Germany
Silver medal – second place	2011 Brazil
European Championship
Gold medal – first place	2018 France
Silver medal – second place	2020 Denmark
Bronze medal – third place	2016 Sweden

Alexandra Maïté Lacrabère (born 27 April 1987) is a French handball player for TMS Ringsted. She is a former player of the French national team.

== Career ==
Lacrabère started playing handball in FR Gan in her hometown. She then joined Bordes Sports Handball followed by CA Bèglais Handball. In the 2008-09 season she joined Spanish team Akaba Bera Bera, where she won the EHF Cup.

She then returned to France and joined Toulouse Féminin Handball, and a year later she joined Arvor 29, where she won the French championship in 2012.

Arvor 29 did however go bankrupt in the following summer, and therefore she joined Russian team Zvezda Zvenigorod for a single season, before joining Mios-Biganos-Bègles.

In the 2013-14 season she was the top scorer in the French league with 129 goals.

The following season she joined league rivals OGC Nice Côte d'Azur.

Two years later she joined North Macedonian team ŽRK Vardar. Here she won the 2017 and 2018 North Macedonian championship.

In 2018 she once again returned to France and joined Fleury Loiret HB. After three years she joined Chambray Touraine Handball.

A year later she moved to Romanian side Rapid București for a single season, before she retired.

A year later she came out of retirement to join the Danish second tier team TMS Ringsted.

=== International handball ===
Lacrabère has won gold medals at 2017 World Championships, the 2018 European Championships and the Tokyo 2020 Olympic Games in addition to silver medals at the 2011 World Championships, 2016 Olympic Games and the 2020 European Championships. She also has a bronze medal from the 2016 European Championships.

== Personal life ==
She is openly lesbian.

== Individual awards ==
- French Championship Top Scorer: 2012, 2014
- French Championship Best Right Back: 2012, 2014
- French Championship MVP: 2012
