= Floriane André =

French handball player (born 2000)

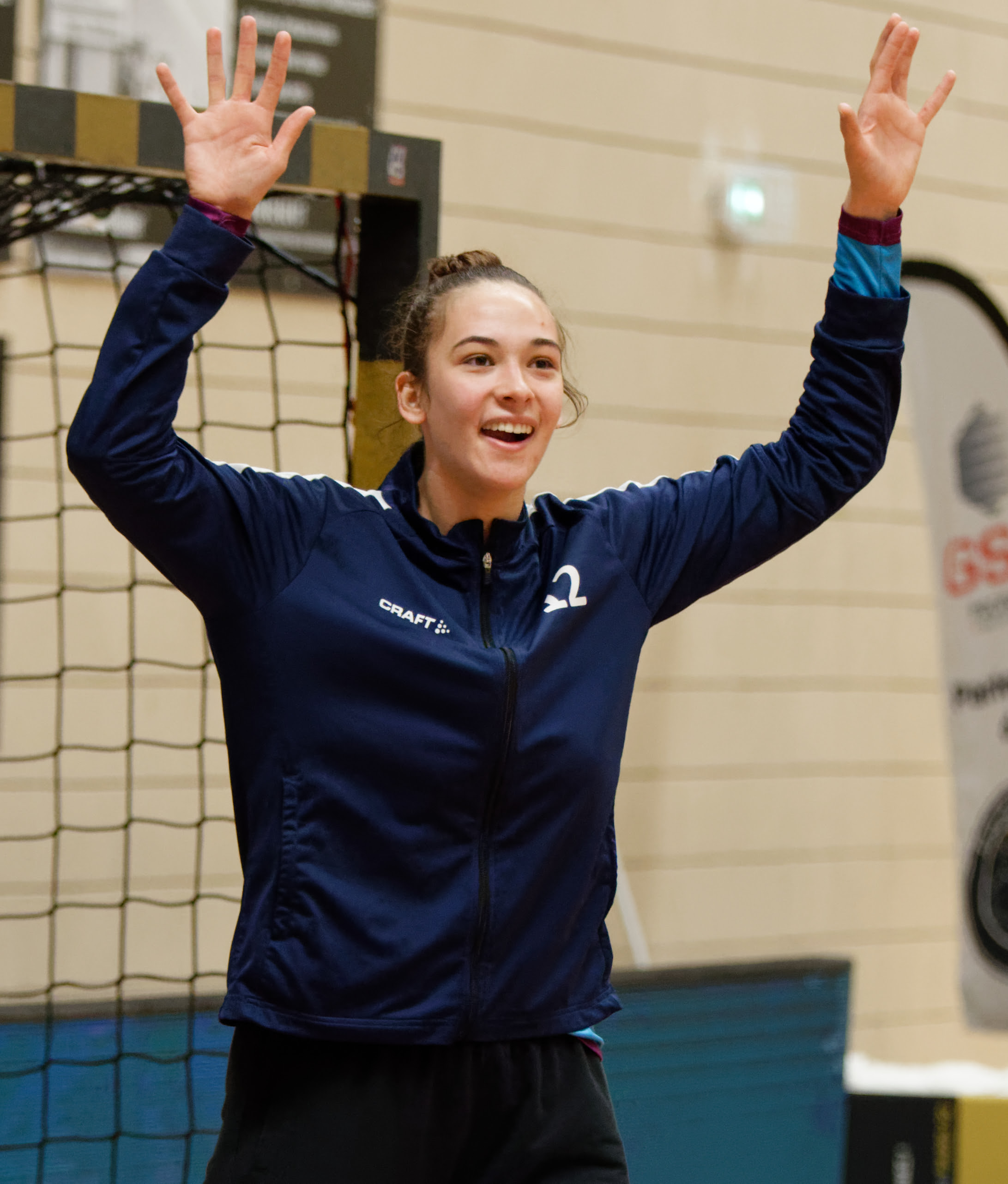
- Floriane André (2021)

Personal information
- Full name: Floriane André
- Nationality: French
- Born: 30 May 2000 (age 26) Saint-Chamond, France
- Height: 1.84 m (6 ft 0 in)

Sport
- Sport: Handball
- Position: Goalkeeper
- Current club: Neptunes de Nantes
- Number: 12

Senior clubs
- Years: Team
- 2018–2024: Neptunes de Nantes
- 2024–: Brest Bretagne Handball
National team
Years	Team	Apps	(Gls)
2022–	France	15	(1)
Medal record
World Championship
Bronze medal – third place	2025 Germany/Netherlands
- Updated on 12 November 2024

Floriane André (born 30 May 2000) is a French female handballer for Brest Bretagne Handball and the French national team.

== Club career ==
André started her career at Neptunes de Nantes, where she won the 2021 EHF European League. For the 2024-25 season she joined Brest Bretagne Handball.

== National team ==
She made her official debut on the French national team on 23 April 2022, against Ukraine in Le Havre. She also represented France at the 2022 European Women's Handball Championship in Slovenia, Montenegro and North Macedonia.

For the 2025 World Championship she won bronze medals losing to Germany in the semifinal and beating Netherlands in extra time the third place playoff. She acted mainly as a second choice to Hatadou Sako.

== Honours ==
=== Club ===
- EHF European League:
  - Winner: 2021
- Coupe de France:
  - Finalist: 2021
