= Lindsay Burlet =

French handballer (born 1994)

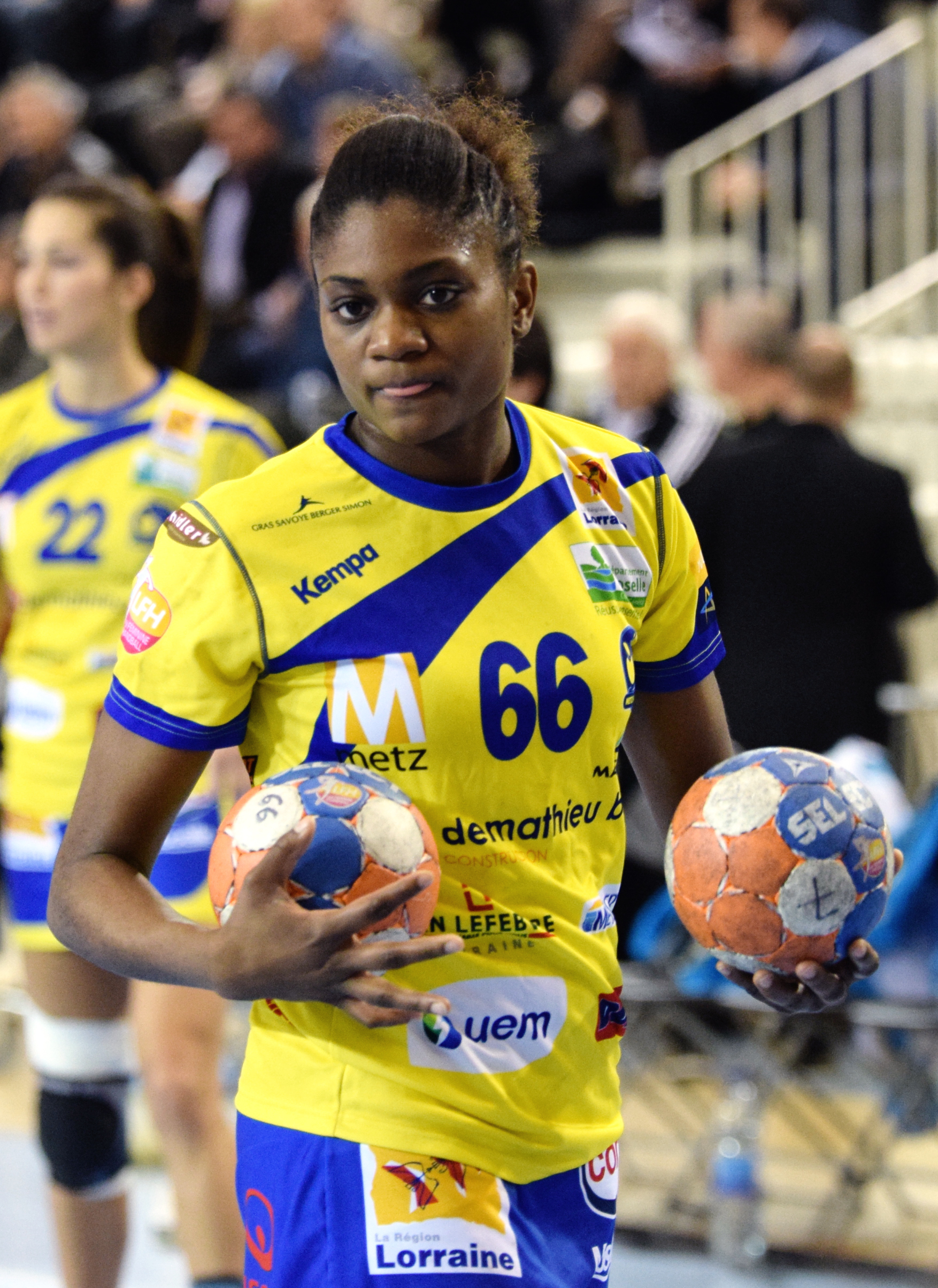
- Burlet on November 12th, 2014

Personal information
- Nationality: French
- Born: 6 June 1994 (age 32) Villepinte, France
- Height: 1.80 m (5 ft 11 in)

Sport
- Sport: Handball
- Position: Right back
- Current club: ESBF Besançon
- Number: 66

Youth career
- Years: Team
- 2012-2014: Metz Handball

Senior clubs
- Years: Team
- 2014–2017: Metz Handball
- 2017–2018: Brest Bretagne Handball
- 2018-: ESBF Besançon

Lindsay Burlet (born 6 June 1994) is a French handballer who plays for Brest Bretagne Handball.

== Achievements ==
- Championnat de France
  - Winner: 2016, 2017
- Coupe de France:
  - Winner: 2017, 2018
