= Oriane Ondono =

French handball player (born 1996)

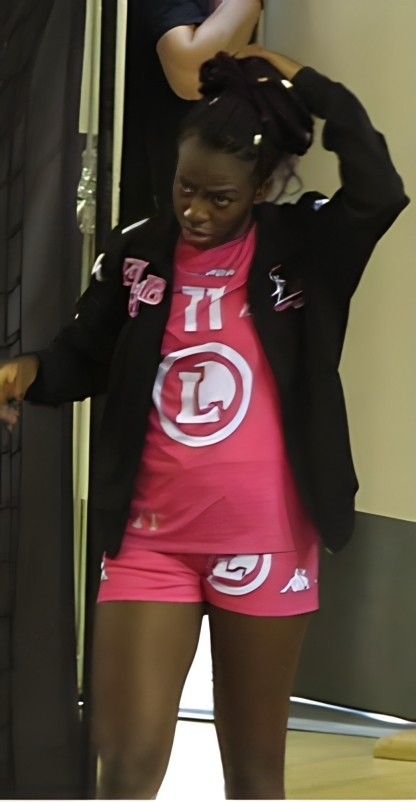
- Ondono in 2017

Personal information
- Nationality: French
- Born: 14 April 1996 (age 30)
- Height: 1.80 m (5 ft 11 in)

Sport
- Sport: Handball
- Position: Pivot
- Current club: Brest Bretagne Handball
- Number: 29

Youth career
- Years: Team
- 2009–2016: AS Cannes
- 2016–2018: Fleury Loiret HB

Senior clubs
- Years: Team
- 2018–2021: Fleury Loiret HB
- 2021–2024: Neptunes de Nantes
- 2024–: Brest Bretagne Handball
National team
Years	Team	Apps	(Gls)
2021–	France	34	(33)
Medal record
Olympic Games
Silver medal – second place	2024 Paris	Team
World Championship
Gold medal – first place	2023 Denmark/Norway/Sweden
Silver medal – second place	2021 Spain
Bronze medal – third place	2025 Germany/Netherlands
- Updated on 12 November 2024

Oriane Ondono (born 14 April 1996) is a French handball player who plays for Brest Bretagne Handball and the French national team. She is a world champion from 2023.

In addition to regular handball Ondono also plays beach handball, where she has featured in the French national team.

== Career ==
Ondono played from 2016 to 2021 for CJF Fleury Loiret Handball. In 2021, she joined Nantes Atlantique Handball. In 2024, she joined Brest Bretagne Handball.

== National team ==
She was selected for the French team for the 2021 World Women's Handball Championship but due to injury she did not play a single game.

At the 2022 European Championship, she finished 4th with the French team.

In 2023, she won the World Championship. At the 2024 Olympics, she won a silver medal.

For the 2025 World Championship she won bronze medals losing to Germany in the semifinal and beating Netherlands in extra time in the third place playoff.
