= Amandine Tissier =

French handball player (born 1993)

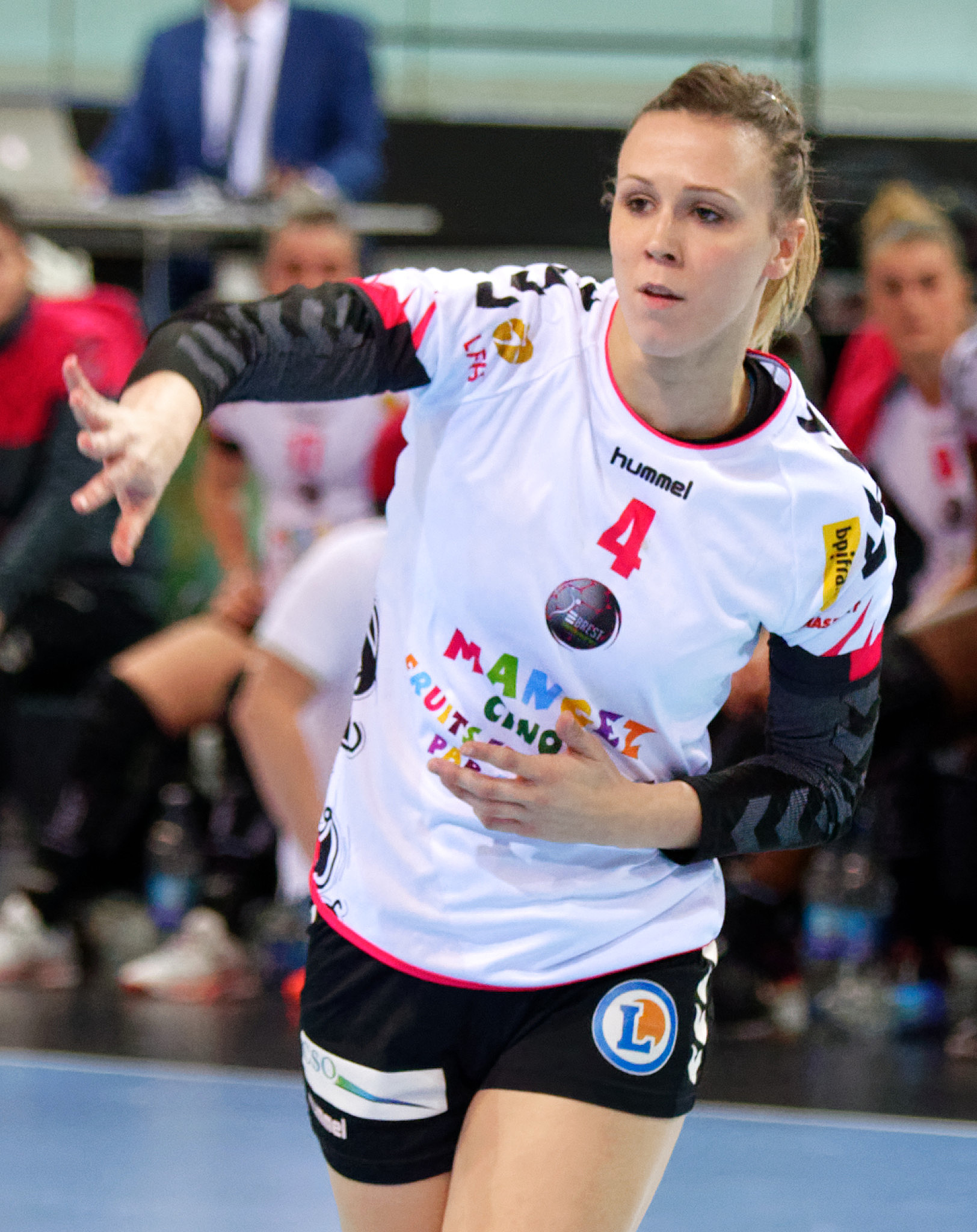
- Amandine Tissier in 2017

Personal information
- Nationality: French
- Born: 10 September 1993 (age 33) Sablé-sur-Sarthe, France
- Height: 1.79 m (5 ft 10 in)

Sport
- Sport: Handball
- Position: Centre back
- Current club: Brest Bretagne
- Number: 4

Senior clubs
- Years: Team
- 2011–2015: Le Havre AC
- 2015–2021: Brest Bretagne
- 2021–: Nantes Atlantique Handball

Amandine Tissier (born 10 September 1993) is a French handball player who plays for Brest Bretagne Handball.

== Achievements ==
- EHF Challenge Cup:
  - Winner: 2012
- Coupe de France:
  - Winner: 2016
  - Finalist: 2012
