= EHF Euro 2022 =

EHF Euro 2022 may refer to:

- 2022 European Men's Handball Championship
- 2022 European Women's Handball Championship
