= Đurđina Jauković =

Montenegrin handball player (born 1997)

Personal information
- Nationality: Montenegrin
- Born: 24 February 1997 (age 29) Nikšić, Montenegro, FR Yugoslavia
- Height: 1.85 m (6 ft 1 in)

Sport
- Sport: Handball
- Position: Left back
- Current club: ŽRK Budućnost Podgorica
- Number: 9

Senior clubs
- Years: Team
- 2007–2013: ŽRK Niksic
- 2013–2015: ŽRK Danilovgrad
- 2015–2020: ŽRK Budućnost Podgorica
- 2020–2024: Brest Bretagne Handball
- 2024–2026: CSM București
- 2026–: ŽRK Budućnost Podgorica
National team
Years	Team	Apps	(Gls)
2014–	Montenegro	110	(459)
Medal record
European Championship
Bronze medal – third place	2022 Slovenia/North Macedonia/Montenegro
Mediterranean Games
Silver medal – second place	2018 Tarragona	Team

Đurđina Jauković (born 24 February 1997) is a Montenegrin handball player for ŽRK Budućnost Podgorica and the Montenegrin national team.

== Achievements ==
=== National team ===
- European Championship:
  - Bronze Medalist: 2022

=== European ===
- EHF Champions League:
  - Finalist: 2021
  - Semi-Finalist: 2016, 2017

=== Domestic ===
- Montenegrin Championship:
  - Winner: 2016, 2017, 2018, 2019
- Montenegrin Cup:
  - Winner: 2016, 2017, 2018, 2019, 2020
- Women's Regional Handball League:
  - Winner: 2016, 2019
- French Women's First League Championship:
  - Winner: 2021
- French Women's Cup Championship:
  - Winner: 2021
- Romanian Supercup:
  - Winner: 2024, 2025
- Romanian Championship:
  - Winner: 2024
- Romanian Cup:
  - Winner: 2024

== Awards and recognition ==
- Handball-Planet.com World Young Female All-Star Team: 2015–16
- MVP of the European Junior Championship 2015
- Top scorer of the European Junior Championship 2015
