= Monika Kobylińska =

Polish handball player (born 1995)

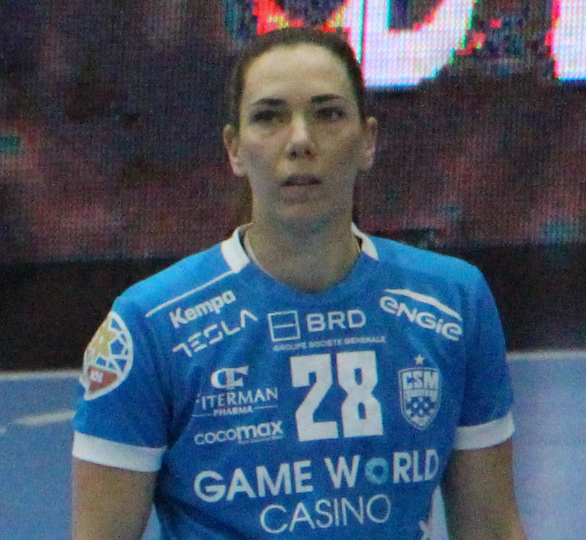

Personal information
- Full name: Monika Kobylińska
- Nationality: Polish
- Born: 9 April 1995 (age 31) Żary, Poland
- Height: 1.77 m (5 ft 10 in)

Sport
- Sport: Handball
- Position: Right back
- Current club: CS Gloria Bistrița
- Number: 28

Senior clubs
- Years: Team
- 2014–2017: Vistal Gdynia
- 2017–2019: TuS Metzingen
- 2019–2023: Brest Bretagne Handball
- 2023–2025: CSM București
- 2025–2026: CS Gloria Bistrița
- 2026–: Debreceni VSC
National team
Years	Team	Apps	(Gls)
2015–	Poland	11027	(453)
- Updated on 4 November 2025

Monika Kobylińska (born 9 April 1995) is a Polish handball player for CS Gloria Bistrița and the Polish national team.

She competed at the 2015 World Women's Handball Championship in Denmark, the 2016 European Championship in Sweden, the 2017 World Championship in Germany, 2018 European Championship in France, the 2021 World Championship in Spain, and the 2022 European Championship in Slovenia, North Macedonia and Montenegro.

She is currently the captain of the Polish national team.

She previously played for GTPR Gdynia in Poland and TuS Metzingen in Germany.

== Achievements ==
=== Club ===
EHF Champions League:

- Finalist: 2021 (with Brest Bretagne Handball)

French league (Division 1 Féminine):

- Winner (gold) : 2021 (with Brest Bretagne Handball)
- Tied 1st: 2020 (with Brest Bretagne Handball)
- Runner up: 2022 (with Brest Bretagne Handball)

French Cup (Coupe de France):

- Winner (gold) : 2021 (with Brest Bretagne Handball)

Polish league:

- Winner (gold) : 2017 (with Vistal Gdynia)

Polish Cup (Puchar Polski):

- Winner (gold) : 2015 & 2016 (with Vistal Gdynia)

=== National team ===
- World Championship
  - 4th: 2015
- Carpathian Trophy:
  - Winner: 2017

=== Individual achievements ===
- Top scorer of the Polish league - 2015/2016: 207 goals with GTPR Gdynia
- Second-best scorer of the Polish league - 2016/2017: 193 goals with GTPR Gdynia
- Rookies/Best Young Players of the 2015 World Championship (Under 22 year old): Best young right back
