= Camille Depuiset =

French handball player (born 1998)

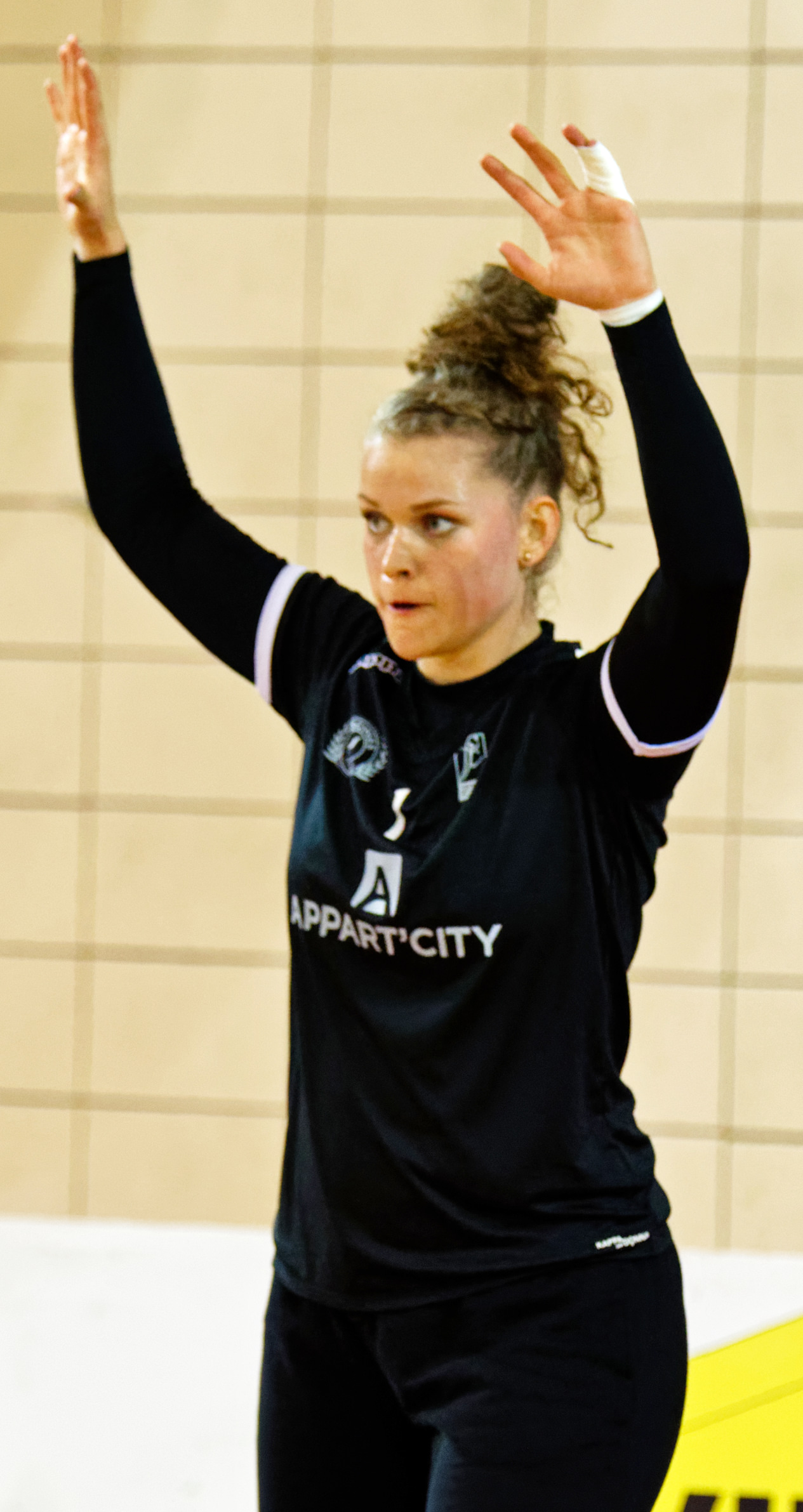
- Depuiset in 2016

Personal information
- Nationality: French
- Born: 19 October 1998 (age 28) Dijon, France
- Height: 1.78 m (5 ft 10 in)

Sport
- Sport: Handball
- Position: Goalkeeper
- Current club: Brest Bretagne Handball
- Number: 1

Youth career
- Years: Team
- 2011-2015: Jeanne d'Arc Dijon Handball
- 2011-2015: Toulon Saint-Cyr Var Handball

Senior clubs
- Years: Team
- 2015-2019: Toulon Saint-Cyr Var Handball
- 2019-2022: Bourg-de-Péage Drôme Handball
- 2022-2025: Metz Handball
- 2025-: Brest Bretagne Handball
National team
Years	Team	Apps	(Gls)
2022–	France	10	(0)
Medal record
World Championship
Gold medal – first place	2023 Denmark/Norway/Sweden
Bronze medal – third place	2025 Germany/Netherlands
- Updated on 5 November 2025

Camille Depuiset (born 19 October 1998) is a French handball player for Brest Bretagne Handball and the French national team. She is a world champion from 2023.

In September 2018, she was included by EHF in a list of the twenty best young handballers to watch for the future.

== Career ==
Depuiset started her career at Toulon Saint-Cyr Var Handball, where she played until 2019, where she joined Bourg-de-Péage Drôme Handball. In 2022 she joined Metz Handball. Here she won the 2023 and 2024 French championship and French cup.

She has signed a contract to join Brest Bretagne Handball from the 2025-26 season.

=== National team ===
In 2017 she won the U19 World Championship with the French team.

In 2022 she participated in the European Championship with the French team. She did however only play a single game.

A year later she won the 2023 World Championship. Once again however, she only played a single game during the tournament.

At the 2025 World Championship she won bronze medals losing to Germany in the semifinal and beating Netherlands in extra time in the third place playoff. She acted mainly as a second choice to Hatadou Sako.
