= Audrey Dembele =

French handball player (born 2001)

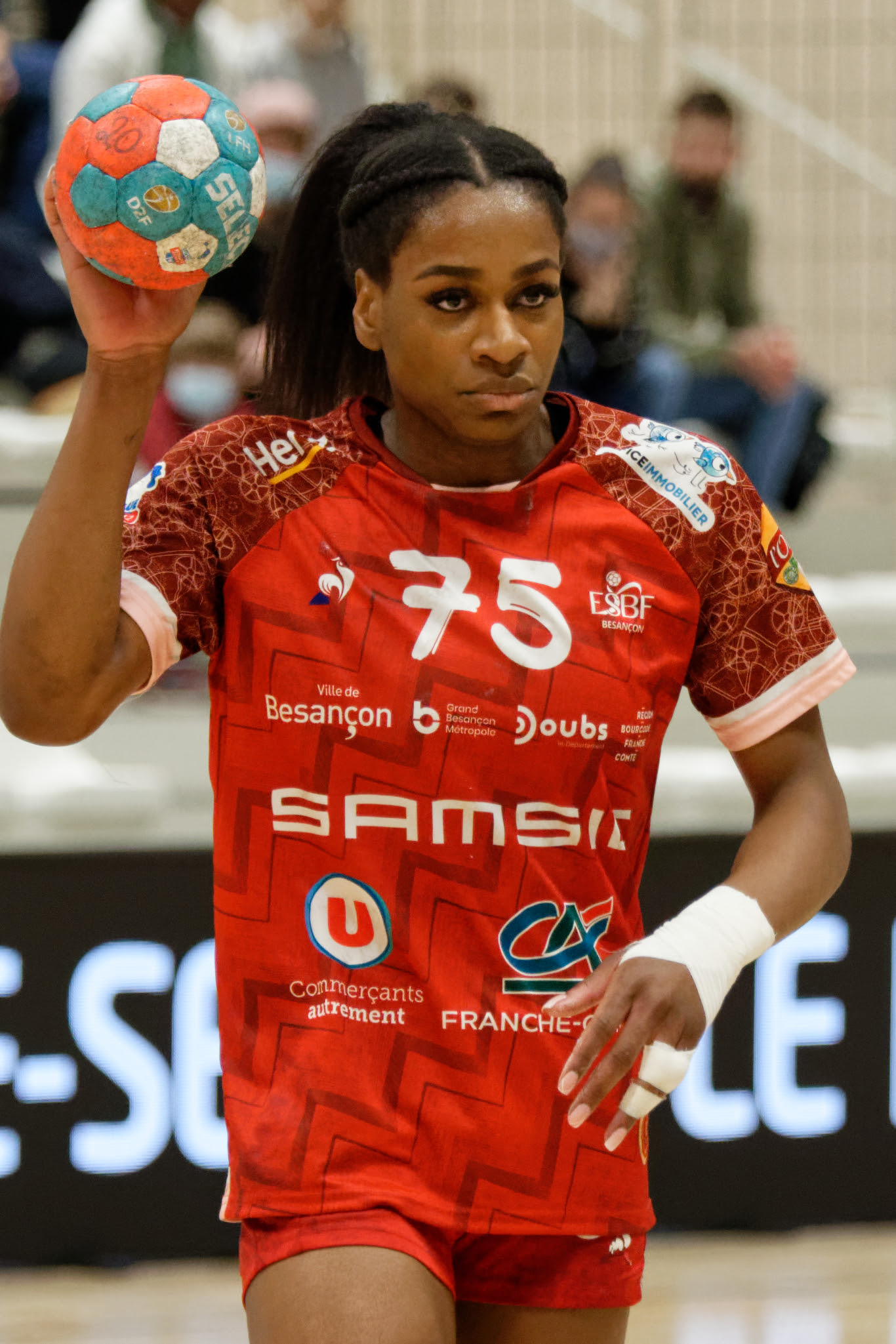
- Audrey Dembélé (2022)

Personal information
- Full name: Mahoua Audrey Dembele
- Nationality: French
- Born: 10 March 2001 (age 25) Paris, France
- Height: 1.83 m (6 ft 0 in)

Sport
- Sport: Handball
- Position: Left back
- Current club: Brest Bretagne Handball
- Number: 75

Youth career
- Years: Team
- 2019–2021: Metz Handball

Senior clubs
- Years: Team
- 2021–2023: ESBF Besançon (loaned by Metz Handball)
- 2023–: Brest Bretagne Handball
National team
Years	Team	Apps	(Gls)
2022–	France	1	(2)

Mahoua Audrey Dembele (born 10 March 2001) is a French female handballer for Brest Bretagne Handball and the French national team.

She represented France at the 2022 European Women's Handball Championship in Slovenia, Montenegro and North Macedonia.
