= Pauletta Foppa =

French handball player (born 2000)

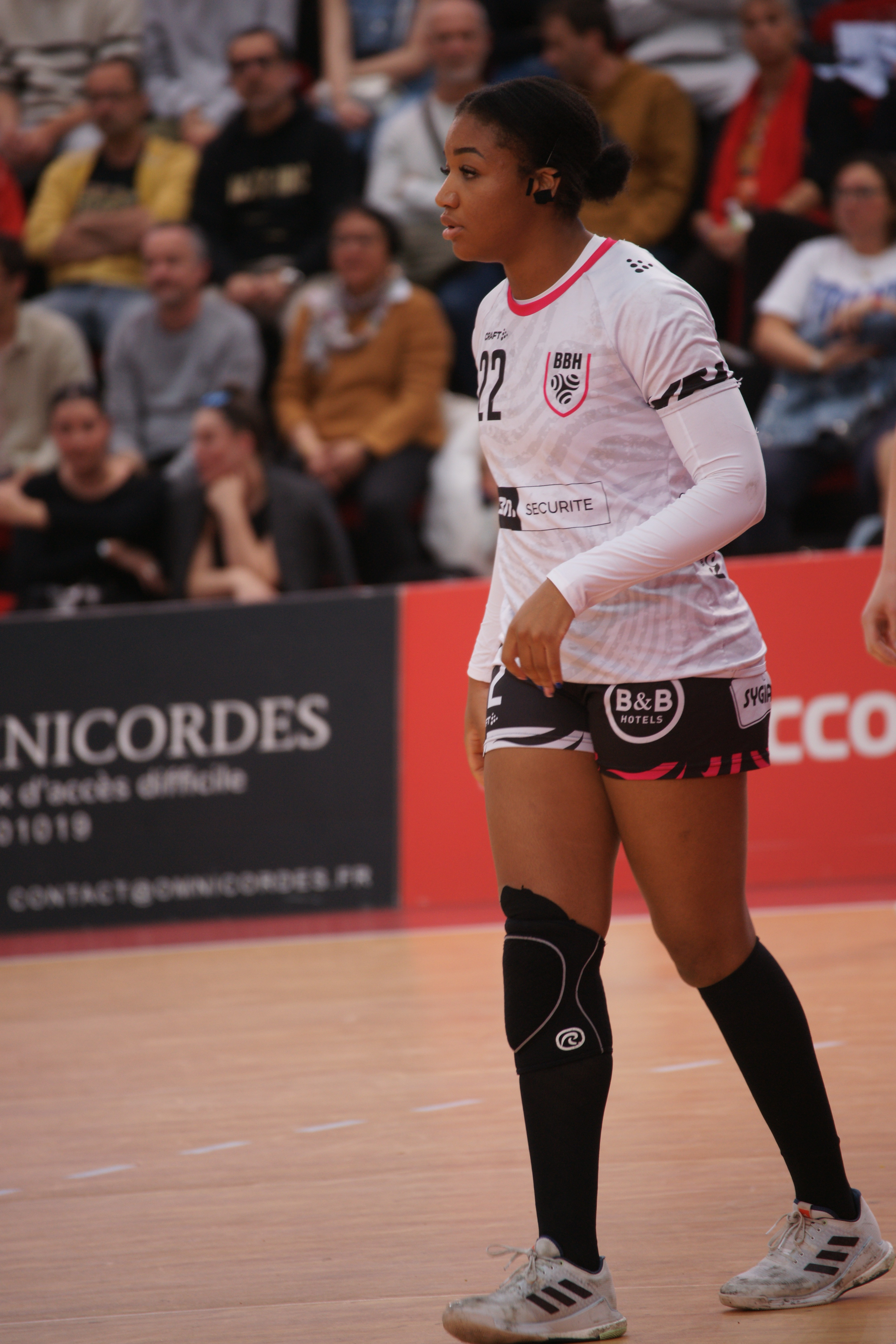
- Foppa in 2024

Personal information
- Full name: Pauletta Soréa Foppa
- Nationality: French
- Born: 22 December 2000 (age 25) Amilly, France
- Height: 1.77 m (5 ft 10 in)

Sport
- Sport: Handball
- Position: Pivot
- Current club: Brest Bretagne Handball
- Number: 22

Youth career
- Years: Team
- –: USM Montargis
- 2017–2018: Fleury Loiret Handball

Senior clubs
- Years: Team
- 2018–: Brest Bretagne Handball
National team
Years	Team	Apps	(Gls)
2018–	France	96	(247)
Medal record
Women's handball
Representing (France) France
Olympic Games
Gold medal – first place	2020 Tokyo	Team
Silver medal – second place	2024 Paris	Team
World Championship
Gold medal – first place	2023 Denmark/Norway/Sweden
Silver medal – second place	2021 Spain
Bronze medal – third place	2025 Germany/Netherlands
European Championship
Gold medal – first place	2018 France
Silver medal – second place	2020 Denmark
- Updated on 12 November 2024

Pauletta Soréa Foppa (born 22 December 2000) is a French handball player for Brest Bretagne Handball and the French national team.

== Career ==
Foppa started playing handball at the age of 10. In 2018, at age 17, she began her senior club career with Brest, and made her senior debut on the French national team on November 22, 2018.

Her sporting achievements include 3 gold medals with the French national team at the European Championships (2018), the Olympic Games (2020), and the World Championships (2023). She has also won the French league and the French Cup with her club Brest.

For the 2025 World Championship she won bronze medals losing to Germany in the semifinal and beating Netherlands in extra time in the third place playoff. During the tournament she played both as her usual position pivot and as a back player, leaving the pivot position to Sarah Bouktit.

== Personal life ==
Born in France, Foppa is of Cameroonian descent.

== Achievements ==
=== Club ===
==== International ====
- EHF Champions League
  - Finalist: 2021 (with Brest Bretagne Handball)

Domestic

- French league:
  - Winner (gold) : 2021 (with Brest Bretagne Handball)
  - Tied 1st: 2020 (with Brest Bretagne Handball)
  - Runner up: 2022, 2023 and 2024 (with Brest Bretagne Handball)
- French Cup (Coupe de France):
  - Winner (gold) : 2021 (with Brest Bretagne Handball)
  - Runner up: 2019 (with Brest Bretagne Handball)

=== National team ===
==== Senior ====
- Olympic Games:
  - 2020: Gold
- World Championship:
  - 2013: 13th
  - 2021: Silver
  - 2023: Gold
  - 2025: Bronze
- European Championship:
  - 2018: Gold
  - 2020: Silver

==== Youth ====
- U-17 European Handball Championship:
  - 2017: 4th place
- U-16 Mediterranean Handball Championship:
  - 2016: Gold

== Awards and recognition ==
=== Individual ===
- All-Star Line player at the Olympic Games: 2020
- All-Star Line player of the EHF Champions League: 2021
- All-Star Line player of the Youth European Championship: 2017
- Best Young Player of the EHF Champions League: 2022
- All-Star Line player of the World Championship: 2021
- All-Star Line player of the European Championship: 2022
- Best Defender of the European Championship: 2024
- EHF Excellence Awards Rookie of the season: 2022/23
- Best Line player of the French League: 2022/23
- Best Defender of the French League: 2022/23
- Best Player and Topscorer of the U-16 Mediterranean Handball Championship: 2016

=== State and civic honours ===
- Inducted into the Legion of Honor with the rank of Chevalier: 2021
