= Amra Pandžić =

Slovenian handball player (born 1989)

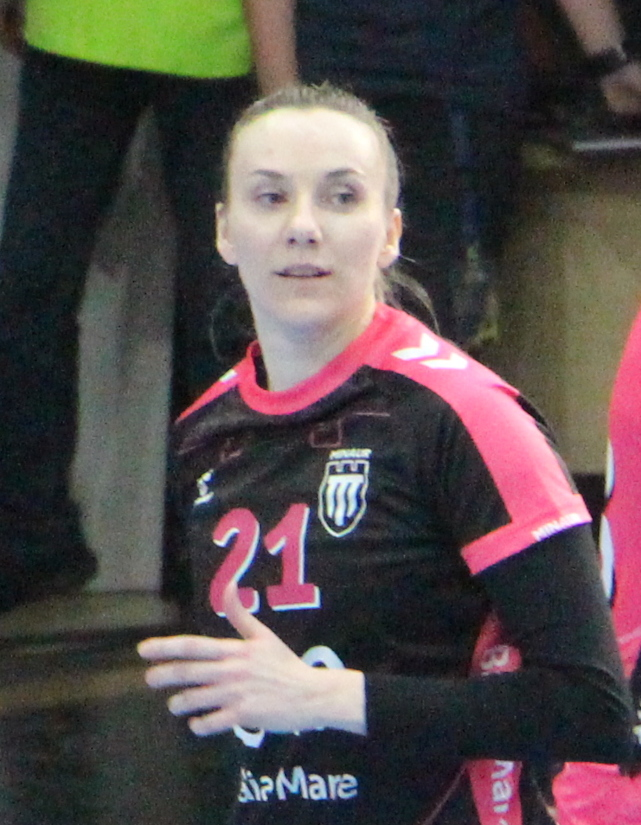
- Pandžić in 2023

Personal information
- Nationality: Slovenian
- Born: 20 September 1989 (age 37) Ljubljana, Slovenia, Yugoslavia
- Height: 1.78 m (5 ft 10 in)

Sport
- Sport: Handball
- Position: Goalkeeper
- Number: 21

Senior clubs
- Years: Team
- –2018: RK Krim
- 2018–2019: Brest Bretagne Handball
- 2019–2021: Kastamonu Belediyesi
- 2021–2024: CS Minaur Baia Mare
- 2024-2025: RK Krim
National team
Years	Team	Apps	(Gls)
–	Slovenia	108	(9)

Amra Pandžić (born 20 September 1989) is a retired handball player for the Slovenian national team. She represented Slovenian national team at the Olympic games in Paris 2024.

She was selected to represent Slovenia at the 2017 World Women's Handball Championship.
