= Itana Grbić =

Montenegrin handball player (born 1996)

Personal information
- Nationality: Montenegrin
- Born: 1 September 1996 (age 30) Podgorica, Montenegro, FR Yugoslavia
- Height: 1.69 m (5 ft 7 in)

Sport
- Sport: Handball
- Position: Centre back
- Current club: ŽRK Budućnost Podgorica
- Number: 96

Youth career
- Years: Team
- 2010–2014: ŽRK Budućnost

Senior clubs
- Years: Team
- 2014–2016: ŽRK Vardar
- 2016–2019: ŽRK Budućnost
- 2019–2020: CSM București
- 2020–2021: ŽRK Budućnost
- 2021–2022: Ferencvárosi TC
- 2022–2023: Brest Bretagne Handball
- 2023–2025: RK Krim
- 2025-: ŽRK Budućnost
National team
| Years | Team | Apps | (Gls) |
| 2015–2026 | Montenegro | 120 | (271) |
Medal record
European Championship
| Bronze medal – third place | 2022 Slovenia/North Macedonia/Montenegro |
Mediterranean Games
| Silver medal – second place | 2018 Tarragona | Team |

Itana Grbić (Serbian Cyrillic: Итана Грбић; born 1 September 1996) is a Montenegrin handball player who plays for ŽRK Budućnost Podgorica and the Montenegrin national team.

Itana is the younger sister of Montenegrin footballer Petar Grbić.

== International honours ==
- EHF Champions League
  - Third place: 2015

== Individual awards ==
- All-Star Left Wing of the Youth World Championship: 2014
- Handball-Planet.com Young World Left Wing of the Season: 2017
