= Union Mios Biganos-Bègles Handball =

French handball club

- Full name: Union Mios Biganos-Bègles Handball
- Short name: Union Mios Biganos-Bègles Handball
- Founded: 2013
- Dissolved: 2015
- Arena: Salle Jean Dauguet, Bordeaux
- Capacity: 2300
- Head coach: Emmanuel Mayonnade (FRA)
- League: Division 1
- 2013–14: 5th
- Club colours
Home	Away

Union Mios Biganos-Bègles Handball is a French handball club from Mios, Gironde playing in nearby Biganos. Established in 2013, it is best known for its women's team, which has played in the country's premier league since 1996.

In 2009 Mios won its first national trophy, the Coupe de France, whose final had previously reached in 1998 and 1999. Two years later it won the 2011 EHF Challenge Cup, its first EHF international title, beating Muratpaşa Bld. SK in the final. Most recently it reached the 2012 Coupe de la Ligue's final, but lost to HF Arvor 29. The club's best result in the national championship to date is a 4th position, attained in four occasions between 1997 and 2011.

== Titles ==
- EHF Challenge Cup
  - Winners: 2011, 2015
- Coupe de France
  - Winners: 2009
  - Finalists: 1998, 1999
- Coupe de la Ligue
  - Finalists: 2012, 2015
- Division 2
  - Winners: 1994, 1995
