= Sandrine Delerce =

French handball player (born 1975)

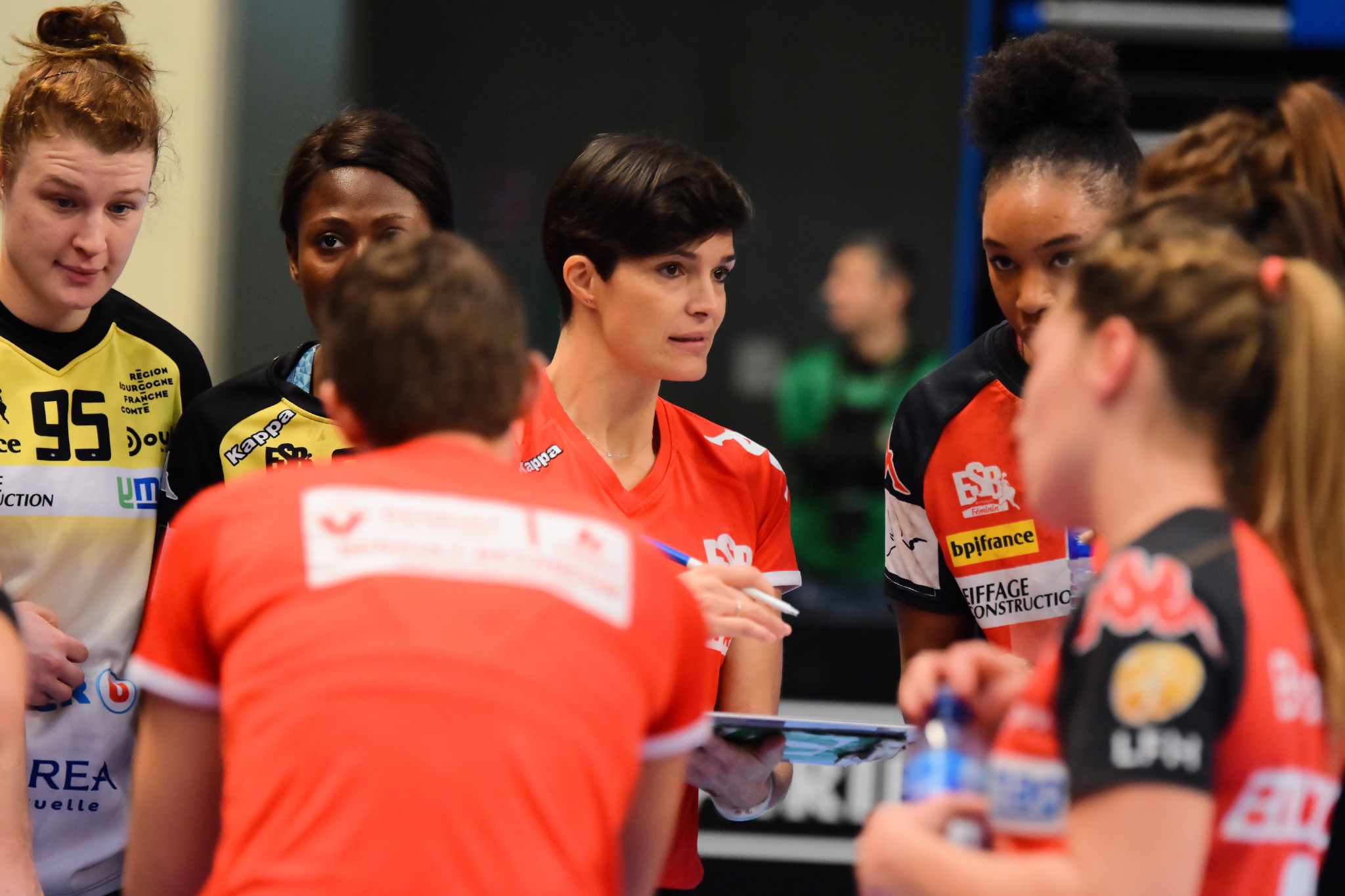
- Sandrine Delerce in 2018

Personal information
- Nationality: French
- Born: 26 April 1975 (age 51) Besançon, Doubs, France
- Height: 1.73 m (5 ft 8 in)

Sport
- Sport: Handball
- Position: Centre back

Senior clubs
- Years: Team
- 1997–2006: ES Besançon
- 2006–2008: Cercle sportif Vesoul Haute-Saône
- 2008–2009: ES Besançon
National team
Years	Team	Apps	(Gls)
1994–2004	France	168	(381)

Teams managed
- 2015–2021: ES Besançon (Assistant)
- 2024–: Brest Bretagne Handball (Assistant)
Medal record
Women's team handball
World Championship
Gold medal – first place	2003 Croatia	Team
Silver medal – second place	1999 Denmark/Norway	Team
European Championship
Bronze medal – third place	2002 Denmark	Team

Sandrine Delerce (born 26 April 1975) is a former French handball player and current assistant coach of Brest Bretagne Handball.

She was born in Besançon, Doubs, France. She competed at the 2000 Summer Olympics, when the French team finished 6th, and at the 2004 Summer Olympics, when France finished 4th.

She was part of the French team that won gold medals at the 2003 World Women's Handball Championship.

Her niece, Clarisse Mairot, is also a professional handball player for the French national team.
