= Clarisse Mairot =

French handball player (born 2001)

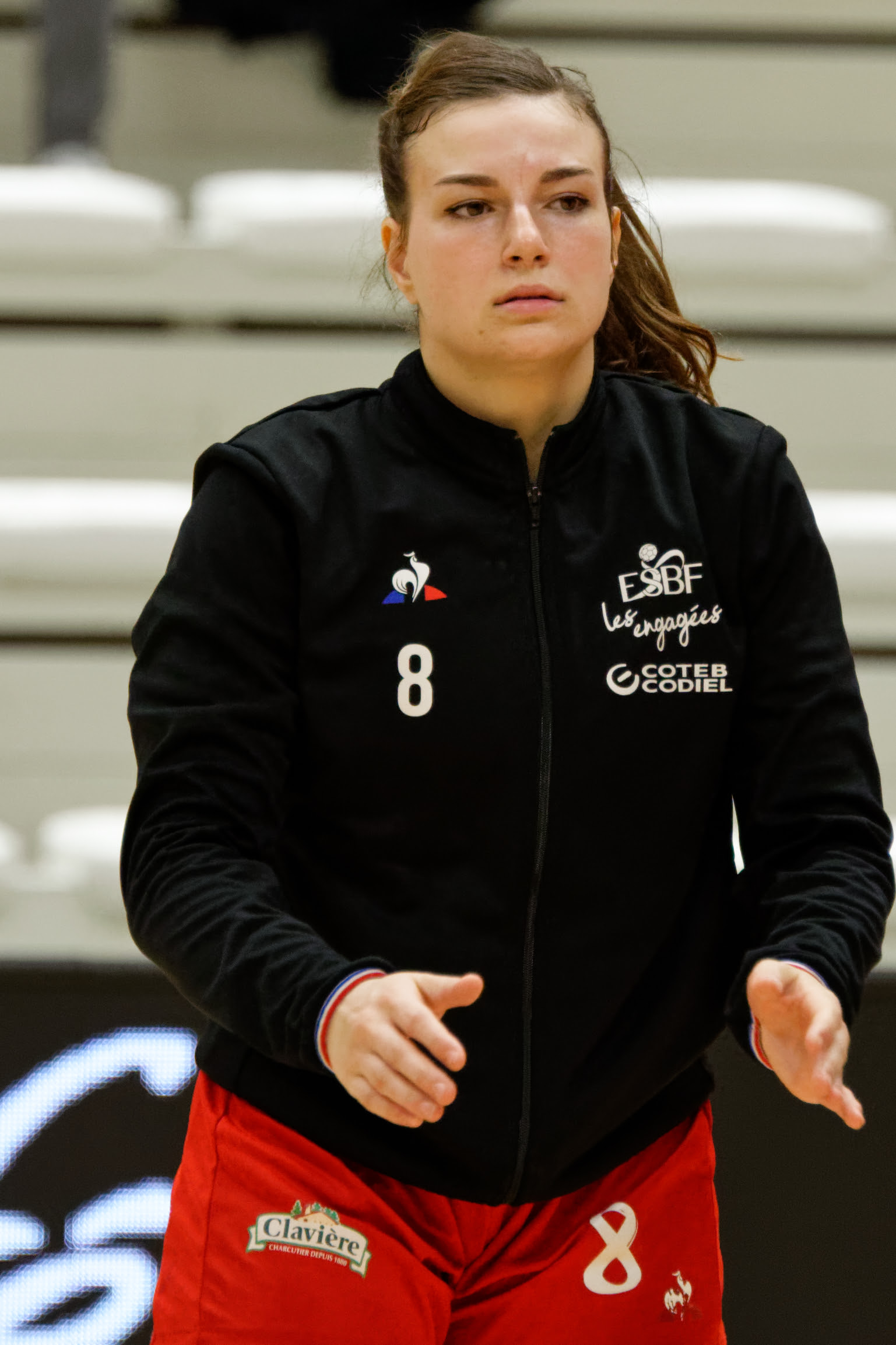
- Clarisse Mairot (2022)

Personal information
- Nationality: French
- Born: 27 January 2001 (age 25) Besançon, France
- Height: 1.70 m (5 ft 7 in)

Sport
- Sport: Handball
- Position: Left back
- Current club: Brest Bretagne Handball
- Number: 8

Youth career
- Years: Team
- –: HBC Marnaysien
- -2019: ESBF Besançon

Senior clubs
- Years: Team
- 2019–2024: ESBF Besançon
- 2024–: Brest Bretagne Handball
National team
| Years | Team | Apps | (Gls) |
| 2024– | France | 23 | (31) |
Medal record
World Championship
| Bronze medal – third place | 2025 Germany/Netherlands |

Clarisse Mairot (born 27 January 2001) is a French handball player who plays for Brest Bretagne Handball and the French national team.

== Career ==
Mairot started playing handball at HBC Marnaysien. When she was 14, she switched to ESBF Besançon. In the 2016/2017 season she became a part of the second team, which played in the French third tier. In 2019 she became a part of the first team, and signed a 2 year contract with the club. In 2022 she reached the final of the French cup.

In 2024 she joined league rivals Brest Bretagne Handball.

She debuted for the French national team in October 2024 against Hungary. Her first major international tournament was 2024 European Women's Handball Championship, where she finished 4th with the French team.

For the 2025 World Championship she won bronze medals losing to Germany in the semifinal and beating Netherlands in the third place playoff.

== Private life ==
Her grandfather was the president of ESBF Besançon for many years. Her mother, Lucille Mairot and her aunt, Sandrine Delerce, were also professional handball players, so is her sister, Juliette Mairot.
