= Brest Bretagne Handball =

French handball club

- Full name: Brest Bretagne Handball
- Nickname: Les Rebelles
- Short name: BBH
- Founded: 2004
- Arena: Brest Arena, Brest, Brittany, France
- Capacity: 4,077
- President: Gérard and Denis Le Saint
- Head coach: Tomáš Hlavatý
- Captain: Oriane Ondono
- League: Ligue Butagaz Énergie
- 2025-2026: 1st
- Club colours
| Home | Away |

Brest Bretagne Handball, also known as BBH, is a French professional handball club from Brest, Brittany. This team currently competes in the French Women's Handball First League from 2016 and the 2025–26 Women's EHF Champions League.

Location of Brest Bretagne Handball

== History ==
The club was founded in 2004 under the name HBF Arvor 29 as a fusion of the two clubs Brest Penn-ar-Bed and de Lesneven-Le Folgoët.

In 2012 they won the French championship for the first time. Afterwards the team had to declare bankruptcy and started again in the third tier under the name Brest Penn Ar Bed.

In 2014 they were promoted to the second tier again. They then changed their name to Brest Bretagne Handball.

Two years later they became the first club ever to win the French Women's Cup as a second tier team. The same year they were promoted to the top league again.

In the 2020–2021 EHF Champions League, the club reached the EHF Final 4 tournament for the first time in the club's history. They won an historic semifinal, against the three-time defending champions and five-time winners from Győri Audi ETO KC. In the final, they were defeated by Norwegian Vipers Kristiansand, who also claimed their first title.

== Crest, colours, supporters ==
=== Naming history ===
| Name | Period |
|---|---|
| HBF Arvor 29 | 2004–2009 |
| Arvor 29 - Pays de Brest | 2009–2012 |
| Brest Penn Ar Bed | 2012–2014 |
| Brest Bretagne Handball | 2014–present |

=== Kits ===
HOME
| 2017–18 | 2018–19 |

AWAY
| 2017–18 | 2018–19 |

== Results ==
- EHF Champions League:
  - Runner-up: 2021
- French Women's First League Championship:
  - Winners: 2012, 2021
  - Runner-up: 2011, 2017, 2018, 2022, 2023, 2024
- French Women's Cup:
  - Winners: 2016, 2018, 2021
  - Runner-up: 2019
- French Women's League Cup:
  - Winners: 2012
  - Runner-up: 2011

== Team ==
=== Current squad ===
Squad for the 2026-27 season

Goalkeepers

- 1 (France) Camille Depuiset
- 12 (France) Floriane André

Wingers
LW

- 9 (France) Kiara Tshimanga
- 10 (France) Coralie Lassource
- 40 (Poland) Daria Michalak

RW

- 30 (France) Siobann Delaye
- 55 (France) Pauline Coatanea

Line players

- 11 (France) Oriane Ondono
- 21 (Sweden) Sofia Hvenfelt
- 22 (France) Pauletta Foppa (pregnant)

LB

- 8 (France) Clarisse Mairot
- 14 (France) Enola Borg
- 23 (Germany) Annika Lott

CB

- 2 (France) Méline Nocandy
- 33 (France) Tamara Horacek

RB

- 38 (Czech Republic) Valerie Smetková

Squad information
| No. | Nat. | Player | Position | Date of birth | In | Contract until | Previous club |
|---|---|---|---|---|---|---|---|
| 1 | (France) | Camille Depuiset | Goalkeeper | 19 October 1998 | 2025 | 2027 | (France) Metz Handball |
| 2 | (France) | Méline Nocandy | Centre Back | 25 February 1998 | 2024 | 2028 | (France) Paris 92 |
| 8 | (France) | Clarisse Mairot | Left Back | 27 January 2001 | 2024 | 2029 | (France) ESBF Besançon |
| 9 | (France) | Kiara Tshimanga | Left Wing | 23 November 2002 | 2025 | 2028 | (France) ESBF Besançon |
| 10 | (France) | Coralie Lassource | Left Wing | 1 September 1992 | 2019 | 2028 | (Hungary) Érd HC |
| 11 | (France) | Oriane Ondono | Line Player | 14 April 1996 | 2024 | 2028 | (France) Neptunes de Nantes |
| 12 | (France) | Floriane André | Goalkeeper | 30 May 2000 | 2024 | 2027 | (France) Neptunes de Nantes |
| 14 | (France) | Enola Borg | Left Back | 31 May 2005 | 2025 | 2027 | (France) Mérignac Handball |
| 21 | (Sweden) | Sofia Hvenfelt | Line Player | 23 April 1996 | 2026 | 2027 | (Germany) HB Ludwigsburg |
| 22 | (France) | Pauletta Foppa | Line Player | 22 December 2000 | 2018 | 2027 | (France) Fleury Loiret |
| 23 | (Germany) | Annika Lott | Left Back | 7 December 1999 | 2024 | 2029 | (Germany) Thüringer HC |
| 30 | (France) | Siobann Delaye | Right Wing | 1 June 2003 | 2023 | 2027 | (France) Bourg-de-Péage |
| 55 | (France) | Pauline Coatanea | Right Wing | 6 July 1993 | 2017 | 2028 | (France) Neptunes de Nantes |

=== Transfers ===
Transfers for the 2027–28 season

Joining

- (Norway) Henny Reistad (CB) (from (Denmark) Team Esbjerg)
- (France) Alicia Toublanc (RW) (from (Hungary) Debreceni VSC)
- (France) Chloé Valentini (LW) (from (France) Metz Handball)
- (Netherlands) Yara ten Holte (GK) (from (Denmark) Odense Håndbold)?
- (Netherlands) Kelly Dulfer (LB) (from (Hungary) Győri ETO KC)?
- (Netherlands) Dione Housheer (RB) (from (Hungary) Győri ETO KC)?

Leaving

- (France) Floriane André (GK) (to (France) Metz Handball) ?
- (France) Siobann Delaye (RW) (to ?)
- (France) Oriane Ondono (LP) (to (Romania) CSM București (women's handball))?

=== Technical staff ===
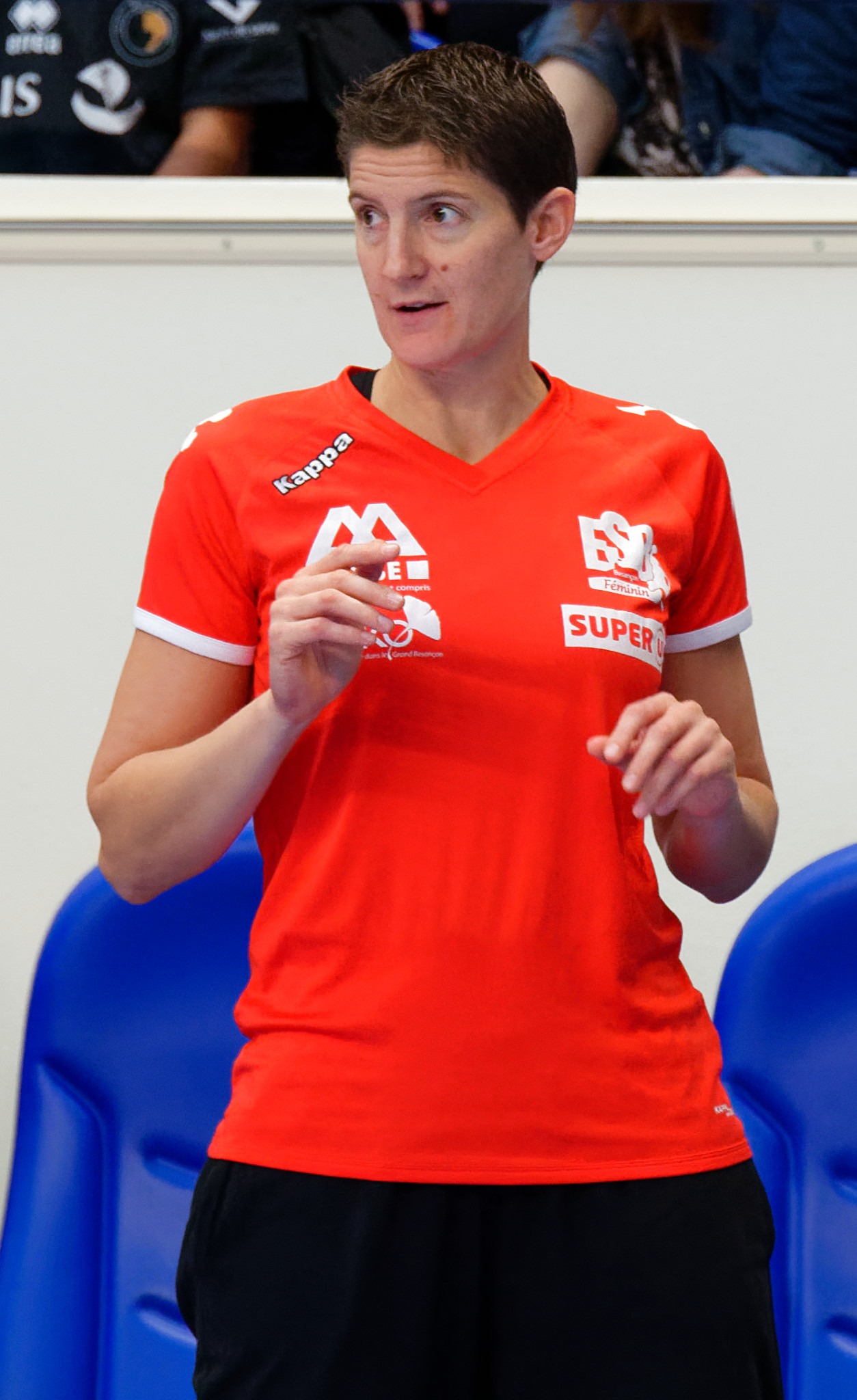
Former Head coach of Brest, Raphaëlle Tervel.

- (Slovakia) Head coach: Tomáš Hlavatý
- (France) Assistant coach: Sandrine Mariot-Delerce
- (France) Goalkeeping coach: Mathieu Kreiss
- (France) Fitness coach:

=== Notable former players ===
- (France) Cléopâtre Darleux (2011–2012; 2016–2024)
- (France) Allison Pineau (2016–2019)
- (France) Alexandra Lacrabère (2010–2012)
- (France) Alicia Toublanc (2015–2024)
- (France) Astride N'Gouan (2015–2018)
- (France) Sophie Herbrecht (2017–2018)
- (France) Lindsay Burlet (2017–2018)
- (France) Marie Prouvensier (2016–2019)
- (France) Maud-Éva Copy (2012–2019)
- (France) Amandine Tissier (2015–2021)
- (France) Kalidiatou Niakaté (2019–2022)
- (France) Constance Mauny (2018–2024)
- (France) Julie Foggea (2022–2024)
- (France) Audrey Dembele (2023–2025)
- (Serbia) Slađana Pop-Lazić (2017–2022)
- (Serbia) Biljana Filipović (2010–2012)
- (Serbia) Jelena Popović (2011–2012)
- (Serbia) Jovana Stoiljković (2017–2019)
- (Sweden) Isabelle Gulldén (2018–2021)
- (Sweden) Louise Sand (2017–2018)
- (Sweden) Filippa Idéhn (2017–2019)
- (Sweden) Jenny Carlson (2022–2024)
- (Montenegro) Tatjana Brnović (2022–2023)
- (Montenegro) Itana Grbić (2022–2023)
- (Montenegro) Djurdjina Jauković (2020–2024)
- (Spain) Alexandrina Cabral (2023–2024)
- (Spain) Marta Mangué (2015–2020)
- (Spain) Nely Carla Alberto (2015–2016)
- (Norway) Tonje Løseth (2020–2022)
- (Norway) Helene Gigstad Fauske (2021–2023)
- (Norway) Kristina Novak (2024–2025)
- (Brazil) Mayssa Pessoa (2009–2011)
- (Brazil) Moniky Bancilon (2011–2013)
- (Slovenia) Ana Gros (2018–2021)
- (Slovenia) Amra Pandžić (2018–2019)
- (Poland) Monika Kobylińska (2019–2023)
- (Poland) Monika Stachowska (2010–2012)
- (Germany) Katharina Filter (2023–2025)
- (Germany) Ewgenija Minevskaja (2019–2020)
- (Tunisia) Faten Yahiaoui (2013–2014)
- (Tunisia) Ouided Kilani (2009)
- (Denmark) Sandra Toft (2019–2022)
- (Russia) Valeriia Maslova (2023–2024)
- (Romania) Melinda Geiger (2016–2017)
- (Netherlands) Merel Freriks (2022–2024)
- (Ukraine) Anastasiia Pidpalova (2013–2014)
- (Algeria) Nabila Tizi (2013–2017)
- (Hungary) Szabina Tápai (2009–2010)
- (North Macedonia) Julija Portjanko (2010–2012)
- (North Macedonia) Iva Mladenovska (2023-2025)

== Management ==
| Position | Name |
|---|---|
| President | (France) Gérard Le Saint (France) Denis Le Saint |
| Sporting director | (France) Cléopâtre Darleux |
| Secretary general (administrative and financial manager) | (France) Mathieu Marchand |
| Academy manager | (France) Romain Corre |

== Arena ==
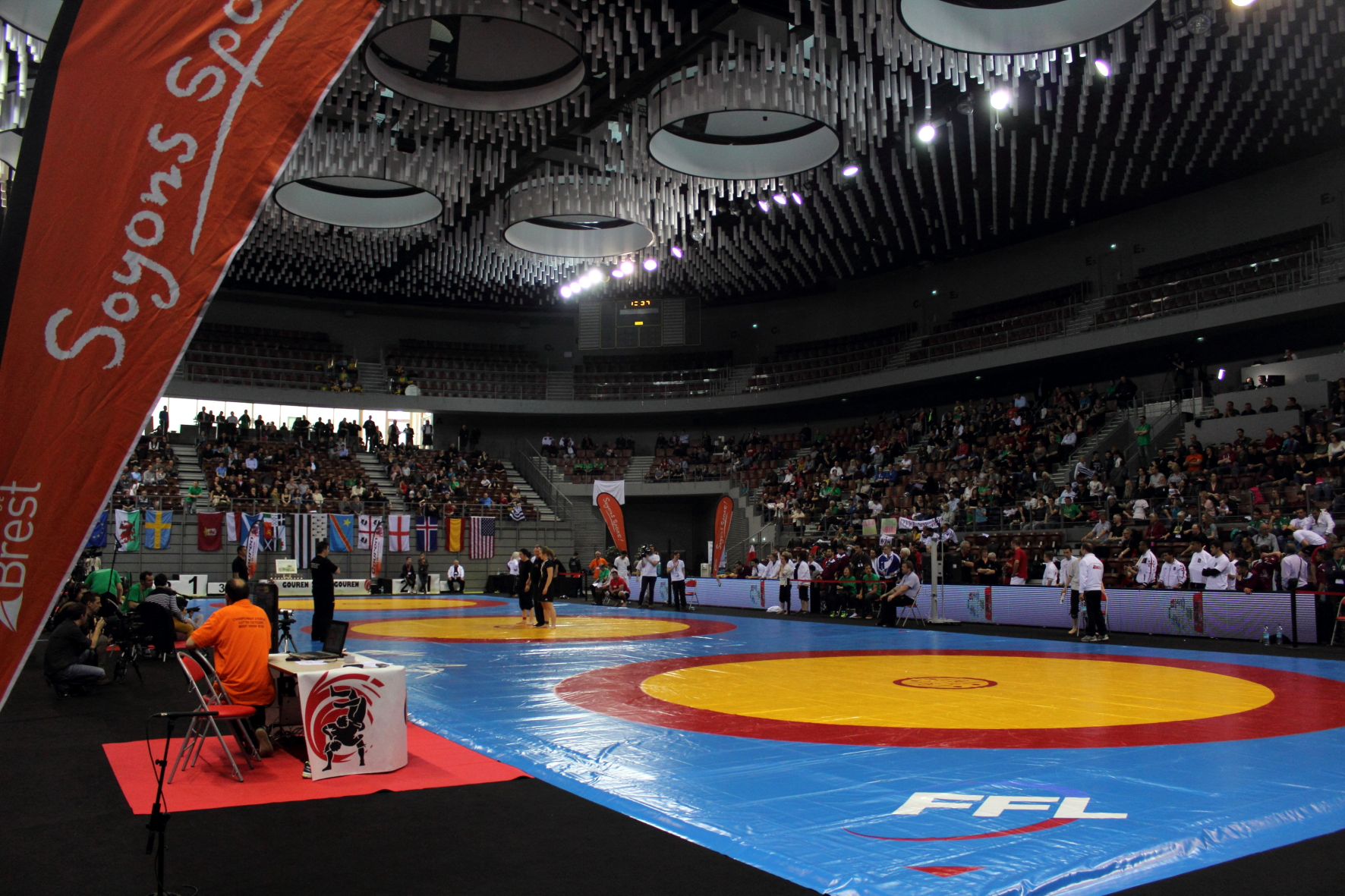

- Name: Brest Arena
- City: Brest, France
- Capacity: 4,077 spectators
- Address: 149 Boulevard de Plymouth, 29200 Brest

== Kit manufacturers ==
| Period | Kit manufacturer | Ref |
|---|---|---|
| ? – 2011/2012 (Arvor 29 era) | (Italy) Macron | |
| 2012/2013 – 2019/2020 | (Denmark) Hummel | |
| 2020/2021 – 2023/2024 | (Sweden) CRAFT | |

== European record ==
| Season | Competition | Round | Club | Home | Away | Aggregate |
|---|---|---|---|---|---|---|
| 2025–26 | EHF Champions League | Group B | (Romania) CSM București | 34–31 | 34–40 | 1st |
| 2025–26 | EHF Champions League | Group B | (Denmark) Odense Håndbold | 40–33 | 40–31 | 1st |
| 2025–26 | EHF Champions League | Group B | (Norway) Sola HK | 36–25 | 26–24 | 1st |
| 2025–26 | EHF Champions League | Group B | (Hungary) Ferencvárosi TC | 34–31 | 28–29 | 1st |
| 2025–26 | EHF Champions League | Group B | (Slovenia) RK Krim Mercator | 32–20 | 37–25 | 1st |
| 2025–26 | EHF Champions League | Group B | (Croatia) RK Podravka Koprivnica | 33–25 | 31–30 | 1st |
| 2025–26 | EHF Champions League | Group B | (Denmark) Ikast Håndbold | 35–37 | 36–33 | 1st |
| 2025–26 | EHF Champions League | QF | (Romania) CS Gloria Bistrița | 36–30 | 36–35 | 72–65 |
| 2025–26 | EHF Champions League | SF | (Hungary) Győri Audi ETO KC | – | | |

== Statistics ==
=== Top scorers in the EHF Champions League ===
Last updated on 3 May 2026

| Rank | Name | Seasons played | Goals |
|---|---|---|---|
| 1 | (France) **Pauletta Foppa** | 7 | 345 |
| 2 | (Slovenia) **Ana Gros** | 4 | 327 |
| 3 | (France) **Pauline Coatanea** | 9 | 270 |
| 4 | (France) **Coralie Lassource** | 6 | 238 |
| 5 | (France) Alicia Toublanc | 6 | 226 |
| 6 | (Russia) **Anna Vyakhireva** | 2 | 189 |
| 7 | (France) **Clarisse Mairot** | 2 | 149 |
| 8 | (Serbia) Slađana Pop-Lazić | 5 | 149 |
| 9 | (Montenegro) Đurđina Jauković | 4 | 142 |
| 10 | (France) Kalidiatou Niakaté | 3 | 140 |

=== Individual awards in the EHF Champions League ===
| Season | Player | Award |
|---|---|---|
| 2020–21 | (Slovenia) Ana Gros | Top Scorer (135 goals) |
| 2020–21 | (France) Pauletta Foppa | All-Star Team (Best Pivot) |
| 2021–22 | (France) Pauletta Foppa | Best Young Player |

=== Top scorers by season ===
| Season | Player | Goals |
|---|---|---|
| ... | | |
| 2011–2012 | (France) Alexandra Lacrabère | 199 |
| 2012–2013 | | |
| 2013–2014 | (Algeria) Nabila Tizi | 153 |
| 2014–2015 | (Algeria) Nabila Tizi | 190 |
| 2015–2016 | (Spain) Marta Mangué | 109 |
| 2016–2017 | (France) Allison Pineau | 146 |
| 2017–2018 | (France) **Pauline Coatanea** | 132 |
| 2018–2019 | (Slovenia) Ana Gros | 287 |
| 2019–2020 | (Slovenia) Ana Gros | 209 |
| 2020–2021 | (Slovenia) Ana Gros | 283 |
| 2021–2022 | (Norway) Helene Fauske | 204 |
| 2022–2023 | (Norway) Helene Fauske | 148 |
| 2023–2024 | (Russia) Valeriia Maslova | 240 |

In bold, still part of the team
