= Coupe de la Ligue (women's handball) =

French handball tournament

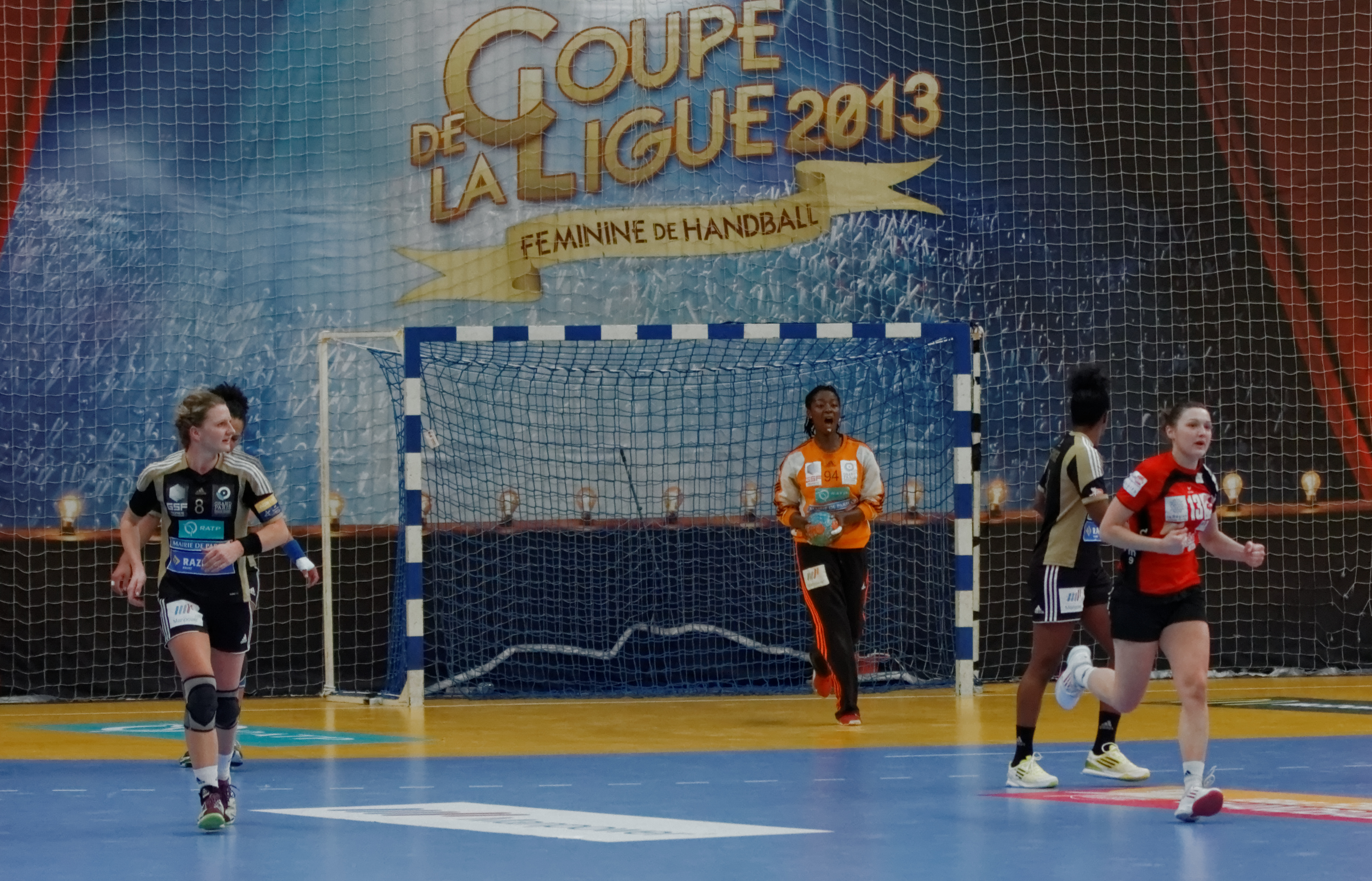

The Coupe de la Ligue was an annual League cup competition for French women's handball professional clubs. Organized by the Ligue Nationale de Handball, it first took place in 2002-2003 and was disestablished after the 2015-2016 edition.

It has been won the most times by Metz Handball with 8 titles.

== Results ==
=== Finals ===
Season	Winner	Finalist	Score
2002-2003	ESBF Besançon	Cercle Dijon Bourgogne	26 – 25
2003-2004	ESBF Besançon (2)	Metz Handball	31 – 28
2004-2005	Metz Handball	Le Havre AC	27 – 26
2005-2006	Metz Handball (2)	Le Havre AC (2)	25 – 21
2006-2007	Metz Handball (3)	Cercle Dijon Bourgogne (2)	25 – 18
2007-2008	Metz Handball (4)	CJF Fleury-Les-Aubrais	36 – 30
2008-2009	Metz Handball (5)	Le Havre AC (3)	25 – 20
2009-2010	Metz Handball (6)	HBC Nîmes	21 – 18
2010-2011	Metz Handball (7)	Handball féminin Arvor 29	29 – 27
2011-2012	Handball féminin Arvor 29	Mios-Biganos bassin d'Arcachon	30 – 27
2012-2013	Issy Paris Hand	HBC Nîmes (2)	23 – 21
2013-2014	Metz Handball (8)	CJF Fleury Loiret (2)	25 – 20
2014-2015	CJF Fleury Loiret	Union Mios Biganos-Bègles	32 – 31
2015-2016	CJF Fleury Loiret (2)	OGC Nice Côte d'Azur Handball	25 – 20

== See also ==
- LNH
- Division 1
- Coupe de France
- Coupe de la Ligue (men)
