= 2022 European Women's Handball Championship =

2022 EHF European Women's Handball Championship
- PLAY WITH HEART

Tournament details
- Host countries: Slovenia; North Macedonia; Montenegro
- Venues: 4 (in 4 host cities)
- Dates: 4–20 November
- Teams: 16 (from 1 confederation)

Final positions
- Champions: Norway (9th title)
- Runners-up: Denmark
- Third place: Montenegro
- Fourth place: France

Tournament statistics
- Matches played: 47
- Goals scored: 2,492 (53.02 per match)
- Attendance: 125,545 (2,671 per match)
- Top scorers: (Norway) Nora Mørk (50 goals)

Awards
- Best player: (Norway) Henny Reistad

The 2022 European Women's Handball Championship was held in Slovenia, North Macedonia and Montenegro from 4 to 20 November 2022. The tournament was advanced a month in order not to coincide with the 2022 FIFA World Cup in Qatar. This tournament was the last to feature 16 teams that had been the case since 2002.

The top three team qualified for the 2023 World Championship and the winner will also qualify for the 2024 Summer Olympics.

Norway won their ninth title after defeating Denmark in the final. Bronze went to Montenegro, who defeated France at the extra time.

== Bidding process ==
=== Bidding timeline ===
The bidding timeline was as follows:

- 1 May 2017: Bidding nations to provide official expression of interest in the hosting of the tournament
- 1 July 2017: Bidding manuals sent to all bidding federations
- 1 November 2017: Deadline for completed bidding and application documentation to be provided to the EHF office
- 15 December 2017: Applications to be approved at the EHF executive committee in Hamburg
- 20 June 2018: appointment of host(s) of EHF Euro 2022 at the 14th ordinary EHF Congress in Glasgow, Scotland

=== Bids ===
On 4 May 2017 it was announced that the following nations had sent in an official expression of interest:

- (North Macedonia) Macedonia

However, when the deadline for submitting the final bids was over, the following applications had been received:

- Slovenia, (North Macedonia) Macedonia & Montenegro

On the 20 June 2018, Slovenia, Macedonia and Montenegro won the hosting rights.

Voting Results
Bids
Bids	Votes
Slovenia, (North Macedonia) Macedonia & Montenegro	41
Votes against the bid	1
Total	42

== Venues ==
The four proposed venues were the venues for the event.

Slovenia		Montenegro	North Macedonia
Ljubljana	Celje	Podgorica	Skopje
Arena Stožice	Zlatorog Arena	Morača Sports Center	Boris Trajkovski Sports Center
Capacity: 12,480	Capacity: 5,191	Capacity: 6,000 (reduced to 4,317)	Capacity: 10,000
2022 European Women's Handball Championship is located in Slovenia		2022 European Women's Handball Championship is located in Montenegro	2022 European Women's Handball Championship is located in North Macedonia

== Qualification ==
=== Qualified teams ===
Country	Qualified as	Date of qualification	Previous appearances in tournament^{1}
Slovenia	Co-hosts	20 June 2018	7 (2002, 2004, 2006, 2010, 2016, 2018, 2020)
North Macedonia	Co-hosts	20 June 2018	5 (1998, 2000, 2006, 2008, 2012)
Montenegro	Co-hosts	20 June 2018	6 (2010, **2012**, 2014, 2016, 2018, 2020)
Norway	2020 champions	20 December 2020	14 (1994, 1996, **1998**, 2000, 2002, **2004**, **2006**, **2008**, **2010**, 2012, **2014**, **2016**, 2018, **2020**)
Netherlands	Group 3 top two	4 March 2022	8 (1998, 2002, 2006, 2010, 2014, 2016, 2018, 2020)
Poland	Group 1 top two	4 March 2022	7 (1996, 1998, 2006, 2014, 2016, 2018, 2020)
Denmark	Group 2 top two	5 March 2022	14 (**1994**, **1996**, 1998, 2000, **2002**, 2004, 2006, 2008, 2010, 2012, 2014, 2016, 2018, 2020)
Switzerland	Group 1 top two	6 March 2022	0 (debut)
France	Group 4 top two	6 March 2022	11 (2000, 2002, 2004, 2006, 2008, 2010, 2012, 2014, 2016, **2018**, 2020)
Sweden	Group 6 top two	20 April 2022	12 (1994, 1996, 2002, 2004, 2006, 2008, 2010, 2012, 2014, 2016, 2018, 2020)
Germany	Group 3 top two	21 April 2022	14 (1994, 1996, 1998, 2000, 2002, 2004, 2006, 2008, 2010, 2012, 2014, 2016, 2018, 2020)
Spain	Group 5 top two	21 April 2022	11 (1998, 2002, 2004, 2006, 2008, 2010, 2012, 2014, 2016, 2018, 2020)
Hungary	Group 5 top two	21 April 2022	14 (1994, 1996, 1998, **2000**, 2002, 2004, 2006, 2008, 2010, 2012, 2014, 2016, 2018, 2020)
Serbia	Group 6 top two	23 April 2022	8 (2006, 2008, 2010, 2012, 2014, 2016, 2018, 2020)
Romania	Group 2 top two	24 April 2022	13 (1994, 1996, 1998, 2000, 2002, 2004, 2008, 2010, 2012, 2014, 2016, 2018, 2020)
Croatia	Group 4 top two	24 April 2022	11 (1994, 1996, 2004, 2006, 2008, 2010, 2012, 2014, 2016, 2018, 2020)

^{1} Bold indicates champion for that year. Italic indicates host for that year.

== Draw ==
The draw was held on 28 April 2022 in Ljubljana, Slovenia.

=== Seedings ===
The pots were announced on 25 April 2022.

Pot 1	Pot 2	Pot 3	Pot 4
Norway; France; Denmark; Poland	Netherlands; Montenegro; Hungary; Sweden	Slovenia; North Macedonia; Croatia; Germany	Spain; Romania; Serbia; Switzerland

== Referees ==
Twelve referee pairs were selected on 13 June 2022. Two pairs were replaced in October 2022.

Referees
Austria	Ana Vranes; Marlis Wenninger
Bosnia and Herzegovina	Tatjana Praštalo; Vesna Balvan
Germany	Maike Merz; Tanja Kuttler
Moldova	Igor Covalciuc; Line Alexei Covalciuc
Montenegro	Jelena Vujačić; Anđelina Kažanegra
North Macedonia	Ismailj Metalari; Nenad Nikolovski

Referees
Norway	Eskil Braseth; Leif Sundet
Portugal	Vânia Sá; Marta Sá
Serbia	Vanja Antić; Jelena Jakovljević
Slovenia	Ozren Backović; Mirko Palačković
Spain	Javier Álvarez; Ion Bustamante
Ukraine	Marina Duplii; Olena Pobedrina

== Squads ==
Each squad consisted of 20 players, and 16 players were selected on the day of each match. There was a maximum of six players who can be replaced during the tournament. However, in regard to the COVID-19 pandemic and the potential risk of several players from the same team testing positive, there was no limit to the number of replacements for players testing positive.

== Preliminary round ==
All times are UTC+1.

=== Group A ===
Pos	Team	Pld	W	D	L	GF	GA	GD	Pts	Qualification
1	Norway	3	3	0	0	102	66	+36	6	Main round
2	Croatia	3	1	1	1	70	76	−6	3	Main round
3	Hungary	3	1	0	2	73	81	−8	2	Main round
4	Switzerland	3	0	1	2	75	97	−22	1	

Source: Eurohandball
Rules for classification: 1) points; 2) head-to-head points; 3) head-to-head goal difference; 4) head-to-head number of goals scored; 5) goal difference.

4 November 2022; 18:00	Hungary	33–28	Switzerland	Arena Stožice, Ljubljana; Attendance: 1,168; Referees: Vujačić, Kažanegra (MNE)
4 November 2022; 18:00	Klujber 9	(12–14)	Schmid 6	Arena Stožice, Ljubljana; Attendance: 1,168; Referees: Vujačić, Kažanegra (MNE)
4 November 2022; 18:00	3× (suspension)	Report	3× (suspension)	Arena Stožice, Ljubljana; Attendance: 1,168; Referees: Vujačić, Kažanegra (MNE)

4 November 2022; 20:30	Norway	32–23	Croatia	Arena Stožice, Ljubljana; Attendance: 1,179; Referees: Duplii, Pobedrina (UKR)
4 November 2022; 20:30	Mørk 8	(16–14)	S. Posavec 4	Arena Stožice, Ljubljana; Attendance: 1,179; Referees: Duplii, Pobedrina (UKR)
4 November 2022; 20:30	5× (suspension)	Report	1× (yellow card) 2× (suspension)	Arena Stožice, Ljubljana; Attendance: 1,179; Referees: Duplii, Pobedrina (UKR)

6 November 2022; 18:00	Croatia	21–18	Hungary	Arena Stožice, Ljubljana; Attendance: 1,424; Referees: Merz, Kuttler (GER)
6 November 2022; 18:00	Blažević 9	(10–7)	Győri-Lukács 4	Arena Stožice, Ljubljana; Attendance: 1,424; Referees: Merz, Kuttler (GER)
6 November 2022; 18:00	2× (yellow card) 5× (suspension)	Report	2× (yellow card) 1× (suspension)	Arena Stožice, Ljubljana; Attendance: 1,424; Referees: Merz, Kuttler (GER)

6 November 2022; 20:30	Switzerland	21–38	Norway	Arena Stožice, Ljubljana; Attendance: 1,123; Referees: M. Sá, V. Sá (POR)
6 November 2022; 20:30	Emmenegger 5	(9–19)	Oftedal 6	Arena Stožice, Ljubljana; Attendance: 1,123; Referees: M. Sá, V. Sá (POR)
6 November 2022; 20:30	1× (suspension)	Report	2× (suspension)	Arena Stožice, Ljubljana; Attendance: 1,123; Referees: M. Sá, V. Sá (POR)

8 November 2022; 18:00	Croatia	26–26	Switzerland	Arena Stožice, Ljubljana; Attendance: 1,088; Referees: Álvarez, Bustamante (ESP)
8 November 2022; 18:00	Japundža 6	(14–12)	Emmenegger 7	Arena Stožice, Ljubljana; Attendance: 1,088; Referees: Álvarez, Bustamante (ESP)
8 November 2022; 18:00	5× (suspension)	Report	1× (yellow card) 2× (suspension)	Arena Stožice, Ljubljana; Attendance: 1,088; Referees: Álvarez, Bustamante (ESP)

8 November 2022; 20:30	Norway	32–22	Hungary	Arena Stožice, Ljubljana; Attendance: 1,088; Referees: Metalari, Nikolovski (MKD)
8 November 2022; 20:30	Ingstad 8	(14–12)	Klujber 6	Arena Stožice, Ljubljana; Attendance: 1,088; Referees: Metalari, Nikolovski (MKD)
8 November 2022; 20:30	4× (suspension)	Report	4× (suspension)	Arena Stožice, Ljubljana; Attendance: 1,088; Referees: Metalari, Nikolovski (MKD)

=== Group B ===
Pos	Team	Pld	W	D	L	GF	GA	GD	Pts	Qualification
1	Sweden	3	2	0	1	83	68	+15	4 (Note: Sweden 2 Pts, +9 GD; Denmark 2 Pts, 0 GD, Slovenia 2 Pts, −9 GD)	Main round
2	Denmark	3	2	0	1	85	72	+13	4	Main round
3	Slovenia (H)	3	2	0	1	77	83	−6	4	Main round
4	Serbia	3	0	0	3	66	88	−22	0	

Source: Eurohandball
Rules for classification: 1) points; 2) head-to-head points; 3) head-to-head goal difference; 4) head-to-head number of goals scored; 5) goal difference.
(H) Hosts
Notes:

4 November 2022; 18:00	Denmark	26–28	Slovenia	Zlatorog Arena, Celje; Attendance: 2,878; Referees: Álvarez, Bustamante (ESP)
4 November 2022; 18:00	Østergaard 7	(15–14)	Gros 8	Zlatorog Arena, Celje; Attendance: 2,878; Referees: Álvarez, Bustamante (ESP)
4 November 2022; 18:00	1× (yellow card) 5× (suspension)	Report	4× (suspension)	Zlatorog Arena, Celje; Attendance: 2,878; Referees: Álvarez, Bustamante (ESP)

4 November 2022; 20:30	Sweden	27–21	Serbia	Zlatorog Arena, Celje; Attendance: 2,878; Referees: M. Sá, V. Sá (POR)
4 November 2022; 20:30	Hagman 9	(14–9)	Stamenić 6	Zlatorog Arena, Celje; Attendance: 2,878; Referees: M. Sá, V. Sá (POR)
4 November 2022; 20:30	5× (suspension)	Report	1× (yellow card) 1× (suspension)	Zlatorog Arena, Celje; Attendance: 2,878; Referees: M. Sá, V. Sá (POR)

6 November 2022; 18:00	Slovenia	22–33	Sweden	Zlatorog Arena, Celje; Attendance: 3,137; Referees: Metalari, Nikolovski (MKD)
6 November 2022; 18:00	Gros 5	(13–14)	Hagman 9	Zlatorog Arena, Celje; Attendance: 3,137; Referees: Metalari, Nikolovski (MKD)
6 November 2022; 18:00	2× (suspension)	Report	2× (suspension)	Zlatorog Arena, Celje; Attendance: 3,137; Referees: Metalari, Nikolovski (MKD)

6 November 2022; 20:30	Serbia	21–34	Denmark	Zlatorog Arena, Celje; Attendance: 3,137; Referees: Duplii, Pobedrina (UKR)
6 November 2022; 20:30	Stoiljković 6	(11–18)	three players 4	Zlatorog Arena, Celje; Attendance: 3,137; Referees: Duplii, Pobedrina (UKR)
6 November 2022; 20:30	3× (suspension)	Report	1× (yellow card) 6× (suspension)	Zlatorog Arena, Celje; Attendance: 3,137; Referees: Duplii, Pobedrina (UKR)

8 November 2022; 18:00	Slovenia	27–24	Serbia	Zlatorog Arena, Celje; Attendance: 3,027; Referees: Merz, Kuttler (GER)
8 November 2022; 18:00	Omoregie 6	(13–15)	Radosavljević 6	Zlatorog Arena, Celje; Attendance: 3,027; Referees: Merz, Kuttler (GER)
8 November 2022; 18:00	1× (yellow card) 6× (suspension)	Report	2× (yellow card) 3× (suspension) 1× (red card)	Zlatorog Arena, Celje; Attendance: 3,027; Referees: Merz, Kuttler (GER)

8 November 2022; 20:30	Denmark	25–23	Sweden	Zlatorog Arena, Celje; Attendance: 3,027; Referees: Vujačić, Kažanegra (MNE)
8 November 2022; 20:30	Friis 9	(13–5)	Axnér 9	Zlatorog Arena, Celje; Attendance: 3,027; Referees: Vujačić, Kažanegra (MNE)
8 November 2022; 20:30	3× (suspension)	Report	1× (yellow card) 2× (suspension)	Zlatorog Arena, Celje; Attendance: 3,027; Referees: Vujačić, Kažanegra (MNE)

=== Group C ===
Pos	Team	Pld	W	D	L	GF	GA	GD	Pts	Qualification
1	France	3	3	0	0	85	59	+26	6	Main round
2	Netherlands	3	2	0	1	83	69	+14	4	Main round
3	Romania	3	1	0	2	80	87	−7	2	Main round
4	North Macedonia (H)	3	0	0	3	52	85	−33	0	

Source: Eurohandball
Rules for classification: 1) points; 2) head-to-head points; 3) head-to-head goal difference; 4) head-to-head number of goals scored; 5) goal difference.
(H) Hosts

5 November 2022; 18:00	France	24–14	North Macedonia	Boris Trajkovski Sports Center, Skopje; Attendance: 2,809; Referees: Praštalo, Balvan (BIH)
5 November 2022; 18:00	Lassource 4	(12–5)	Janeska 5	Boris Trajkovski Sports Center, Skopje; Attendance: 2,809; Referees: Praštalo, Balvan (BIH)
5 November 2022; 18:00	3× (suspension)	Report	1× (yellow card) 4× (suspension)	Boris Trajkovski Sports Center, Skopje; Attendance: 2,809; Referees: Praštalo, Balvan (BIH)

5 November 2022; 20:30	Netherlands	29–28	Romania	Boris Trajkovski Sports Center, Skopje; Attendance: 2,809; Referees: Braseth, Sundet (NOR)
5 November 2022; 20:30	Van der Heijden 7	(14–12)	three players 5	Boris Trajkovski Sports Center, Skopje; Attendance: 2,809; Referees: Braseth, Sundet (NOR)
5 November 2022; 20:30	2× (yellow card) 4× (suspension)	Report	1× (yellow card) 2× (suspension)	Boris Trajkovski Sports Center, Skopje; Attendance: 2,809; Referees: Braseth, Sundet (NOR)

7 November 2022; 18:00	North Macedonia	15–30	Netherlands	Boris Trajkovski Sports Center, Skopje; Attendance: 2,471; Referees: Vranes, Wenninger (AUT)
7 November 2022; 18:00	Ristovska 4	(9–17)	Smits 7	Boris Trajkovski Sports Center, Skopje; Attendance: 2,471; Referees: Vranes, Wenninger (AUT)
7 November 2022; 18:00	1× (yellow card) 5× (suspension)	Report	2× (yellow card) 5× (suspension)	Boris Trajkovski Sports Center, Skopje; Attendance: 2,471; Referees: Vranes, Wenninger (AUT)

7 November 2022; 20:30	Romania	21–35	France	Boris Trajkovski Sports Center, Skopje; Attendance: 2,471; Referees: Backović, Palačković (SLO)
7 November 2022; 20:30	Grozav, Neagu 5	(11–17)	Nze Minko 6	Boris Trajkovski Sports Center, Skopje; Attendance: 2,471; Referees: Backović, Palačković (SLO)
7 November 2022; 20:30	1× (yellow card) 2× (suspension)	Report	1× (yellow card) 4× (suspension)	Boris Trajkovski Sports Center, Skopje; Attendance: 2,471; Referees: Backović, Palačković (SLO)

9 November 2022; 18:00	North Macedonia	23–31	Romania	Boris Trajkovski Sports Center, Skopje; Attendance: 2,389; Referees: Antić, Jakovljević (SRB)
9 November 2022; 18:00	Dabevska 7	(12–13)	Neagu 10	Boris Trajkovski Sports Center, Skopje; Attendance: 2,389; Referees: Antić, Jakovljević (SRB)
9 November 2022; 18:00	1× (yellow card) 2× (suspension)	Report	6× (suspension)	Boris Trajkovski Sports Center, Skopje; Attendance: 2,389; Referees: Antić, Jakovljević (SRB)

9 November 2022; 20:30	France	26–24	Netherlands	Boris Trajkovski Sports Center, Skopje; Attendance: 2,389; Referees: A. Covalciuc, I. Covalciuc (MDA)
9 November 2022; 20:30	Foppa, Nze Minko 4	(14–12)	Malestein 9	Boris Trajkovski Sports Center, Skopje; Attendance: 2,389; Referees: A. Covalciuc, I. Covalciuc (MDA)
9 November 2022; 20:30	1× (yellow card) 3× (suspension)	Report	1× (yellow card) 2× (suspension)	Boris Trajkovski Sports Center, Skopje; Attendance: 2,389; Referees: A. Covalciuc, I. Covalciuc (MDA)

=== Group D ===
Pos	Team	Pld	W	D	L	GF	GA	GD	Pts	Qualification
1	Montenegro (H)	3	3	0	0	85	71	+14	6	Main round
2	Spain	3	1	0	2	67	73	−6	2 (Note: Spain 2 Pts, +1 GD; Germany 2 Pts, 0 GD, Poland 2 Pts, −1 GD)	Main round
3	Germany	3	1	0	2	71	75	−4	2	Main round
4	Poland	3	1	0	2	68	72	−4	2	

Source: Eurohandball
Rules for classification: 1) points; 2) head-to-head points; 3) head-to-head goal difference; 4) head-to-head number of goals scored; 5) goal difference.
(H) Hosts
Notes:

5 November 2022; 18:00	Montenegro	30–23	Spain	Morača Sports Center, Podgorica; Attendance: 3,019; Referees: Vranes, Wenninger (AUT)
5 November 2022; 18:00	Jauković, Radičević 5	(12–9)	Cabral 5	Morača Sports Center, Podgorica; Attendance: 3,019; Referees: Vranes, Wenninger (AUT)
5 November 2022; 18:00	4× (suspension)	Report	1× (yellow card) 3× (suspension)	Morača Sports Center, Podgorica; Attendance: 3,019; Referees: Vranes, Wenninger (AUT)

5 November 2022; 20:30	Poland	23–25	Germany	Morača Sports Center, Podgorica; Attendance: 3,019; Referees: Antić, Jakovljević (SRB)
5 November 2022; 20:30	Balsam 5	(12–11)	Grijseels 8	Morača Sports Center, Podgorica; Attendance: 3,019; Referees: Antić, Jakovljević (SRB)
5 November 2022; 20:30	1× (yellow card) 5× (suspension)	Report	1× (yellow card) 2× (suspension)	Morača Sports Center, Podgorica; Attendance: 3,019; Referees: Antić, Jakovljević (SRB)

7 November 2022; 18:00	Germany	25–29	Montenegro	Morača Sports Center, Podgorica; Attendance: 3,406; Referees: A. Covalciuc, I. Covalciuc (MDA)
7 November 2022; 18:00	Bölk, Grijseels 7	(12–15)	Jauković 9	Morača Sports Center, Podgorica; Attendance: 3,406; Referees: A. Covalciuc, I. Covalciuc (MDA)
7 November 2022; 18:00	1× (yellow card) 5× (suspension) 1× (red card)	Report	2× (suspension)	Morača Sports Center, Podgorica; Attendance: 3,406; Referees: A. Covalciuc, I. Covalciuc (MDA)

7 November 2022; 20:30	Spain	21–22	Poland	Morača Sports Center, Podgorica; Attendance: 3,406; Referees: Praštalo, Balvan (BIH)
7 November 2022; 20:30	Cabral 7	(12–12)	Kobylińska 5	Morača Sports Center, Podgorica; Attendance: 3,406; Referees: Praštalo, Balvan (BIH)
7 November 2022; 20:30	4× (suspension)	Report	1× (yellow card) 4× (suspension)	Morača Sports Center, Podgorica; Attendance: 3,406; Referees: Praštalo, Balvan (BIH)

9 November 2022; 18:00	Poland	23–26	Montenegro	Morača Sports Center, Podgorica; Attendance: 4,317; Referees: Backović, Palačković (SLO)
9 November 2022; 18:00	Kobylińska 6	(12–12)	Radičević 12	Morača Sports Center, Podgorica; Attendance: 4,317; Referees: Backović, Palačković (SLO)
9 November 2022; 18:00	4× (suspension)	Report	2× (yellow card) 2× (suspension)	Morača Sports Center, Podgorica; Attendance: 4,317; Referees: Backović, Palačković (SLO)

9 November 2022; 20:30	Germany	21–23	Spain	Morača Sports Center, Podgorica; Attendance: 4,317; Referees: Braseth, Sundet (NOR)
9 November 2022; 20:30	Grijseels 6	(10–11)	Campos 6	Morača Sports Center, Podgorica; Attendance: 4,317; Referees: Braseth, Sundet (NOR)
9 November 2022; 20:30	3× (suspension)	Report	1× (yellow card) 3× (suspension)	Morača Sports Center, Podgorica; Attendance: 4,317; Referees: Braseth, Sundet (NOR)

== Main round ==
=== Group I ===
Pos	Team	Pld	W	D	L	GF	GA	GD	Pts	Qualification
1	Denmark	5	4	0	1	137	124	+13	8 (Note: Norway 29–31 Denmark)	Semifinals
2	Norway	5	4	0	1	146	124	+22	8	Semifinals
3	Sweden	5	3	0	2	142	126	+16	6	Fifth place game
4	Slovenia (H)	5	2	0	3	124	132	−8	4	
5	Croatia	5	1	0	4	106	133	−27	2 (Note: Croatia 21–18 Hungary)	
6	Hungary	5	1	0	4	121	137	−16	2	

Source: Eurohandball
Rules for classification: 1) points; 2) head-to-head points; 3) head-to-head goal difference; 4) head-to-head number of goals scored; 5) goal difference.
(H) Hosts
Notes:

10 November 2022; 18:00	Croatia	18–26	Slovenia	Arena Stožice, Ljubljana; Attendance: 4,126; Referees: Metalari, Nikolovski (MKD)
10 November 2022; 18:00	Blažević 5	(12–13)	Gros 7	Arena Stožice, Ljubljana; Attendance: 4,126; Referees: Metalari, Nikolovski (MKD)
10 November 2022; 18:00	1× (yellow card) 2× (suspension)	Report	2× (suspension)	Arena Stožice, Ljubljana; Attendance: 4,126; Referees: Metalari, Nikolovski (MKD)

10 November 2022; 20:30	Hungary	27–29	Denmark	Arena Stožice, Ljubljana; Attendance: 4,126; Referees: M. Sá, V. Sá (POR)
10 November 2022; 20:30	Klujber 8	(12–14)	Friis 7	Arena Stožice, Ljubljana; Attendance: 4,126; Referees: M. Sá, V. Sá (POR)
10 November 2022; 20:30	3× (suspension)	Report	2× (yellow card) 2× (suspension)	Arena Stožice, Ljubljana; Attendance: 4,126; Referees: M. Sá, V. Sá (POR)

12 November 2022; 18:00	Croatia	17–26	Denmark	Arena Stožice, Ljubljana; Attendance: 1,323; Referees: Merz, Kuttler (GER)
12 November 2022; 18:00	Pavlović 6	(8–14)	Jørgensen 5	Arena Stožice, Ljubljana; Attendance: 1,323; Referees: Merz, Kuttler (GER)
12 November 2022; 18:00	2× (suspension)	Report	4× (suspension)	Arena Stožice, Ljubljana; Attendance: 1,323; Referees: Merz, Kuttler (GER)

12 November 2022; 20:30	Norway	27–25	Sweden	Arena Stožice, Ljubljana; Attendance: 1,323; Referees: Álvarez, Bustamante (ESP)
12 November 2022; 20:30	Reistad 7	(13–13)	Carlson 9	Arena Stožice, Ljubljana; Attendance: 1,323; Referees: Álvarez, Bustamante (ESP)
12 November 2022; 20:30	3× (suspension)	Report	1× (yellow card) 4× (suspension)	Arena Stožice, Ljubljana; Attendance: 1,323; Referees: Álvarez, Bustamante (ESP)

14 November 2022; 18:00	Norway	26–23	Slovenia	Arena Stožice, Ljubljana; Attendance: 5,648; Referees: Praštalo, Balvan (BIH)
14 November 2022; 18:00	Reistad 10	(16–15)	Gros 5	Arena Stožice, Ljubljana; Attendance: 5,648; Referees: Praštalo, Balvan (BIH)
14 November 2022; 18:00	2× (suspension)	Report	1× (yellow card) 4× (suspension)	Arena Stožice, Ljubljana; Attendance: 5,648; Referees: Praštalo, Balvan (BIH)

14 November 2022; 20:30	Hungary	25–30	Sweden	Arena Stožice, Ljubljana; Attendance: 5,648; Referees: Vujačić, Kažanegra (MNE)
14 November 2022; 20:30	Klujber 6	(15–18)	Roberts 9	Arena Stožice, Ljubljana; Attendance: 5,648; Referees: Vujačić, Kažanegra (MNE)
14 November 2022; 20:30	1× (yellow card) 3× (suspension)	Report	1× (suspension)	Arena Stožice, Ljubljana; Attendance: 5,648; Referees: Vujačić, Kažanegra (MNE)

16 November 2022; 15:30	Hungary	29–25	Slovenia	Arena Stožice, Ljubljana; Attendance: 4,263; Referees: Merz, Kuttler (GER)
16 November 2022; 15:30	Klujber 9	(14–14)	Gros 6	Arena Stožice, Ljubljana; Attendance: 4,263; Referees: Merz, Kuttler (GER)
16 November 2022; 15:30	2× (suspension)	Report	1× (yellow card) 3× (suspension)	Arena Stožice, Ljubljana; Attendance: 4,263; Referees: Merz, Kuttler (GER)

16 November 2022; 18:00	Croatia	27–31	Sweden	Arena Stožice, Ljubljana; Attendance: 4,263; Referees: M. Sá, V. Sá (POR)
16 November 2022; 18:00	Petika 6	(11–17)	Hagman 8	Arena Stožice, Ljubljana; Attendance: 4,263; Referees: M. Sá, V. Sá (POR)
16 November 2022; 18:00	2× (yellow card) 2× (suspension)	Report	2× (suspension)	Arena Stožice, Ljubljana; Attendance: 4,263; Referees: M. Sá, V. Sá (POR)

16 November 2022; 20:30	Norway	29–31	Denmark	Arena Stožice, Ljubljana; Attendance: 4,263; Referees: Metalari, Nikolovski (MKD)
16 November 2022; 20:30	Mørk 8	(13–12)	A. M. Hansen 7	Arena Stožice, Ljubljana; Attendance: 4,263; Referees: Metalari, Nikolovski (MKD)
16 November 2022; 20:30	1× (yellow card) 2× (suspension)	Report	3× (suspension)	Arena Stožice, Ljubljana; Attendance: 4,263; Referees: Metalari, Nikolovski (MKD)

=== Group II ===
Pos	Team	Pld	W	D	L	GF	GA	GD	Pts	Qualification
1	France	5	5	0	0	153	108	+45	10	Semifinals
2	Montenegro	5	3	0	2	138	151	−13	6	Semifinals
3	Netherlands	5	2	1	2	152	144	+8	5	Fifth place game
4	Germany	5	2	0	3	135	137	−2	4	
5	Spain	5	1	1	3	125	144	−19	3	
6	Romania	5	1	0	4	139	158	−19	2	

Source: Eurohandball
Rules for classification: 1) points; 2) head-to-head points; 3) head-to-head goal difference; 4) head-to-head number of goals scored; 5) goal difference.

11 November 2022; 18:00	Netherlands	28–36	Germany	Boris Trajkovski Sports Center, Skopje; Attendance: 389; Referees: Antić, Jakovljević (SRB)
11 November 2022; 18:00	Malestein 8	(13–17)	Grijseels 8	Boris Trajkovski Sports Center, Skopje; Attendance: 389; Referees: Antić, Jakovljević (SRB)
11 November 2022; 18:00	4× (suspension) 1× (red card)	Report	7× (suspension)	Boris Trajkovski Sports Center, Skopje; Attendance: 389; Referees: Antić, Jakovljević (SRB)

11 November 2022; 20:30	Romania	28–27	Spain	Boris Trajkovski Sports Center, Skopje; Attendance: 389; Referees: Backović, Palačković (SLO)
11 November 2022; 20:30	Pintea 7	(12–11)	González Ortega, Gutiérrez Bermejo 4	Boris Trajkovski Sports Center, Skopje; Attendance: 389; Referees: Backović, Palačković (SLO)
11 November 2022; 20:30	1× (yellow card) 3× (suspension)	Report	1× (yellow card) 1× (suspension)	Boris Trajkovski Sports Center, Skopje; Attendance: 389; Referees: Backović, Palačković (SLO)

13 November 2022; 18:00	Netherlands	29–29	Spain	Boris Trajkovski Sports Center, Skopje; Attendance: 973; Referees: Duplii, Pobedrina (UKR)
13 November 2022; 18:00	Freriks, Smits 6	(15–17)	Cabral, Valdivia 4	Boris Trajkovski Sports Center, Skopje; Attendance: 973; Referees: Duplii, Pobedrina (UKR)
13 November 2022; 18:00	3× (suspension)	Report	3× (suspension)	Boris Trajkovski Sports Center, Skopje; Attendance: 973; Referees: Duplii, Pobedrina (UKR)

13 November 2022; 20:30	France	27–19	Montenegro	Boris Trajkovski Sports Center, Skopje; Attendance: 973; Referees: Braseth, Sundet (NOR)
13 November 2022; 20:30	Foppa 6	(12–9)	Radičević 6	Boris Trajkovski Sports Center, Skopje; Attendance: 973; Referees: Braseth, Sundet (NOR)
13 November 2022; 20:30	3× (suspension)	Report	1× (suspension)	Boris Trajkovski Sports Center, Skopje; Attendance: 973; Referees: Braseth, Sundet (NOR)

15 November 2022; 18:00	Romania	34–35	Montenegro	Boris Trajkovski Sports Center, Skopje; Attendance: 924; Referees: Vranes, Wenninger (AUT)
15 November 2022; 18:00	Neagu 9	(18–18)	Grbić, Radičević 8	Boris Trajkovski Sports Center, Skopje; Attendance: 924; Referees: Vranes, Wenninger (AUT)
15 November 2022; 18:00	1× (yellow card) 6× (suspension)	Report	3× (suspension)	Boris Trajkovski Sports Center, Skopje; Attendance: 924; Referees: Vranes, Wenninger (AUT)

15 November 2022; 20:30	France	29–21	Germany	Boris Trajkovski Sports Center, Skopje; Attendance: 924; Referees: A. Covalciuc, I. Covalciuc (MDA)
15 November 2022; 20:30	Kanor 5	(13–9)	Grijseels 7	Boris Trajkovski Sports Center, Skopje; Attendance: 924; Referees: A. Covalciuc, I. Covalciuc (MDA)
15 November 2022; 20:30	4× (suspension)	Report	1× (suspension)	Boris Trajkovski Sports Center, Skopje; Attendance: 924; Referees: A. Covalciuc, I. Covalciuc (MDA)

16 November 2022; 15:30	Romania	28–32	Germany	Boris Trajkovski Sports Center, Skopje; Attendance: 770; Referees: Duplii, Pobedrina (UKR)
16 November 2022; 15:30	Neagu 7	(14–16)	Stockschläder 10	Boris Trajkovski Sports Center, Skopje; Attendance: 770; Referees: Duplii, Pobedrina (UKR)
16 November 2022; 15:30	1× (yellow card) 3× (suspension)	Report	2× (suspension)	Boris Trajkovski Sports Center, Skopje; Attendance: 770; Referees: Duplii, Pobedrina (UKR)

16 November 2022; 18:00	Netherlands	42–25	Montenegro	Boris Trajkovski Sports Center, Skopje; Attendance: 842; Referees: Backović, Palačković (SLO)
16 November 2022; 18:00	Smits 7	(21–15)	Jauković 11	Boris Trajkovski Sports Center, Skopje; Attendance: 842; Referees: Backović, Palačković (SLO)
16 November 2022; 18:00	4× (suspension)	Report	4× (suspension)	Boris Trajkovski Sports Center, Skopje; Attendance: 842; Referees: Backović, Palačković (SLO)

16 November 2022; 20:30	France	36–23	Spain	Boris Trajkovski Sports Center, Skopje; Attendance: 842; Referees: Antić, Jakovljević (SRB)
16 November 2022; 20:30	Valentini 6	(17–9)	Campos 5	Boris Trajkovski Sports Center, Skopje; Attendance: 842; Referees: Antić, Jakovljević (SRB)
16 November 2022; 20:30	1× (suspension)	Report	2× (suspension)	Boris Trajkovski Sports Center, Skopje; Attendance: 842; Referees: Antić, Jakovljević (SRB)

== Knockout stage ==
=== Bracket ===
Semi-finals
18 November
Denmark	27
Montenegro	23
18 November
Norway	28
France	20

Final
20 November
Denmark	25
Norway	27
Third place
20 November
Montenegro (ET)	27
France	25

=== Fifth place game ===
18 November 2022; 15:00	Sweden	37–32	Netherlands	Arena Stožice, Ljubljana; Attendance: 3,600; Referees: M. Sá, V. Sá (POR)
18 November 2022; 15:00	Hagman 9	(21–16)	three players 5	Arena Stožice, Ljubljana; Attendance: 3,600; Referees: M. Sá, V. Sá (POR)
18 November 2022; 15:00	4× (suspension)	Report	1× (yellow card) 3× (suspension)	Arena Stožice, Ljubljana; Attendance: 3,600; Referees: M. Sá, V. Sá (POR)

=== Semifinals ===
18 November 2022; 17:45	Denmark	27–23	Montenegro	Arena Stožice, Ljubljana; Attendance: 3,600; Referees: A. Covalciuc, I. Covalciuc (MDA)
18 November 2022; 17:45	Friis 7	(14–10)	Grbić, Jauković 7	Arena Stožice, Ljubljana; Attendance: 3,600; Referees: A. Covalciuc, I. Covalciuc (MDA)
18 November 2022; 17:45	5× (suspension)	Report	4× (suspension)	Arena Stožice, Ljubljana; Attendance: 3,600; Referees: A. Covalciuc, I. Covalciuc (MDA)

18 November 2022; 20:30	Norway	28–20	France	Arena Stožice, Ljubljana; Attendance: 3,600; Referees: Merz, Kuttler (GER)
18 November 2022; 20:30	Mørk 8	(12–11)	Zaadi 5	Arena Stožice, Ljubljana; Attendance: 3,600; Referees: Merz, Kuttler (GER)
18 November 2022; 20:30	1× (suspension)	Report	2× (yellow card) 2× (suspension)	Arena Stožice, Ljubljana; Attendance: 3,600; Referees: Merz, Kuttler (GER)

=== Third place game ===
20 November 2022
17:45
Montenegro
27–25 (ET)
France
Arena Stožice, Ljubljana
Attendance: 5,380
Referees: Praštalo, Balvan (BIH)
Jauković, Radičević 6
(13–12)
Granier, Nze Minko 4
5× (suspension) 1× (red card)
Report
1× (yellow card) 6× (suspension)

FT: 22–22 ET: 5–3

=== Final ===
20 November 2022; 20:30	Denmark	25–27	Norway	Arena Stožice, Ljubljana; Attendance: 5,380; Referees: Álvarez, Bustamante (ESP)
20 November 2022; 20:30	Burgaard 6	(15–12)	Mørk 8	Arena Stožice, Ljubljana; Attendance: 5,380; Referees: Álvarez, Bustamante (ESP)
20 November 2022; 20:30	1× (yellow card) 2× (suspension)	Report	1× (yellow card) 3× (suspension)	Arena Stožice, Ljubljana; Attendance: 5,380; Referees: Álvarez, Bustamante (ESP)

== Final ranking and awards ==
=== Final ranking ===
Qualified for the 2023 World Championship and 2024 European Women's Handball Championship
Qualified for the 2023 World Championship and 2024 Summer Olympics
Qualified for the 2023 World Championship

Rank	Team
1st place, gold medalist(s)	Norway
2nd place, silver medalist(s)	Denmark
3rd place, bronze medalist(s)	Montenegro
4	France
5	Sweden
6	Netherlands
7	Germany
8	Slovenia
9	Spain
10	Croatia
11	Hungary
12	Romania
13	Poland
14	Switzerland
15	Serbia
16	North Macedonia

2022 Women's European Champions

Norway
Ninth title

Team roster: Marie Davidsen, Emilie Hegh Arntzen, Ragnhild Valle Dahl, Maren Nyland Aardahl, Stine Skogrand, Nora Mørk, Stine Bredal Oftedal, Malin Aune, Silje Solberg-Østhassel, Kristine Breistøl, Vilde Ingstad, Katrine Lunde, Kristina Novak, Henny Reistad, Emilie Hovden, Sunniva Næs Andersen, Anniken Wollik, Thale Rushfeldt Deila, Ane Høgseth.
Head coach: Þórir Hergeirsson.

=== All Star Team ===
The All Star Team and awards were announced on 20 November 2022.

Position	Player
Goalkeeper	(France) Cléopatre Darleux
Left wing	(Denmark) Emma Friis
Left back	(Romania) Cristina Neagu
Centre back	(Norway) Stine Bredal Oftedal
Right back	(Hungary) Katrin Klujber
Right wing	(Montenegro) Jovanka Radičević
Pivot	(France) Pauletta Foppa
Best defense player	(Denmark) Kathrine Heindahl
Most valuable player	(Norway) Henny Reistad

== Statistics ==
=== Top goalscorers ===
Rank	Name	Goals	Shots	%
1	(Norway) Nora Mørk	50	64	78
2	(Montenegro) Đurđina Jauković	48	86	56
3	(Norway) Henny Reistad	46	73	63
4	(Germany) Alina Grijseels	44	62	71
5	(Sweden) Nathalie Hagman	43	60	72
5	(Montenegro) Jovanka Radičević	43	54	80
7	(Denmark) Emma Friis	40	57	70
8	(Romania) Cristina Neagu	39	70	56
9	(Hungary) Katrin Klujber	38	74	51
10	(Slovenia) Ana Gros	36	60	60

=== Top goalkeepers ===
Rank	Name	%	Saves	Shots
1	(Norway) Silje Solberg-Østhassel	39	62	157
2	(France) Cléopatre Darleux	37	67	182
3	(Denmark) Althea Reinhardt	36	27	76
4	(France) Floriane André	35	25	72
4	(Croatia) Tea Pijević	35	56	158
4	(Poland) Adrianna Płaczek	35	30	86
7	(Denmark) Sandra Toft	33	68	204
8	(Sweden) Johanna Bundsen	32	24	76
8	(Sweden) Jessica Ryde	32	58	181
10	(Romania) Daciana Hosu	31	29	95
10	(Norway) Katrine Lunde	31	43	137

== Marketing ==
The official logo was unveiled on 25 March 2021 the same day as the qualifiers draw in Vienna, Austria, The colours in the tournament logo and branding take inspiration from various elements connected to host cities in nations, Slovenia, North Macedonia and Montenegro.
