= Coupe de France (women's handball) =

Annual national handball competition

Tournament information
- Sport: Handball
- Location: France
- Established: 1984
- Administrator: Fédération française de handball
- Qualifier for: EHF European League
- Most championships: Metz Handball (13 titles)
- Website: Site officiel (FFHB); Actualités (LFH)

Current champion
- Metz Handball (2024/25)

The Coupe de France féminine de handball is an annual national cup competition for French women's handball clubs. Its champion used to qualify for the EHF Cup Winners' Cup and now qualifies for the Women's EHF European League. Organized by the French Handball Federation, it first took place in 1984-1985, but it has been discontinued on several occasions.

It is contested by all clubs based in France and French overseas territories.

Metz Handball is the competition's most successful club as of 2024 with 13 titles, followed by ES Besançon with four.

== Champions ==
=== Winners by season ===
- 1985 (Île-de-France) USM Gagny
- 1986 (Île-de-France) Stade Français d'Issy
- 1987 (Île-de-France) Stade Français d'Issy
- 1988 not held
- 1989 not held
- 1990 (Lorraine) ASPTT Metz
- 1991 not held
- 1992 (Île-de-France) USM Gagny
- 1993 (Île-de-France) USM Gagny
- 1994 (Lorraine) ASPTT Metz
- 1995 not held
- 1996 not held
- 1997 not held
- 1998 (Lorraine) ASPTT Metz
- 1999 (Lorraine) ASPTT Metz
- 2000 not held
- 2001 (Franche-Comté) ES Besançon
- 2002 (Franche-Comté) ES Besançon
- 2003 (Franche-Comté) ES Besançon
- 2004 not held
- 2005 (Franche-Comté) ES Besançon
- 2006 (Upper Normandy) Le Havre AC
- 2007 (Upper Normandy) Le Havre AC
- 2008 not held
- 2009 (Aquitaine) Mios Biganos Handball
- 2010 (Lorraine) Metz Handball
- 2011 (Provence-Alpes-Côte d'Azur) Toulon Handball
- 2012 (Provence-Alpes-Côte d'Azur) Toulon Handball
- 2013 (Lorraine) Metz Handball
- 2014 CJF Fleury Loiret
- 2015 (Lorraine) Metz Handball
- 2016 (Brittany) Brest Bretagne Handball
- 2017 (Lorraine) Metz Handball
- 2018 (Brittany) Brest Bretagne Handball
- 2019 (Lorraine) Metz Handball (9)
- 2020 cancelled
- 2021 (Brittany) Brest Bretagne Handball
- 2022 (Lorraine) Metz Handball (10)
- 2023 (Lorraine) Metz Handball (11)
- 2024 (Lorraine) Metz Handball (12)
- 2025 (Lorraine) Metz Handball (13)

=== Performances ===
#	Club	Winner		Runner-up	
#	Club	Nb	Years	Nb	Years
1	Metz Handball (T)	12	1990, 1994, 1998, 1999, 2010, 2013, 2015, 2017, 2019, 2022, 2023, 2024, 2025	6	1987, 1992, 1993, 2001, 2005, 2009
2	ES Besançon	4	2001, 2002, 2003, 2005	3	1986, 1998, 2022
3	USM Gagny	3	1985, 1992, 1993	2	1990, 1994
4	Brest Bretagne Handball	3	2016, 2018, 2021	1	2019
5	Le Havre AC	2	2006, 2007	2	2010, 2012
5	Toulon Saint-Cyr	2	2011, 2012	2	2016, 2018
7	Stade français	2	1986, 1987	0	
8	Mios Biganos Handball	1	2009	1	2006
9	CJF Fleury Loiret	1	2014	0	
10	HBC Nîmes	0		4	1999, 2003, 2011, 2015
11	Cercle Dijon Bourgogne	0		4	2002, 2007, 2013, 2024
12	Issy Paris Hand	0		4	2014, 2017, 2023, 2025
13	ASUL Vaulx-en-Velin	0		1	1985
13	Nantes Atlantique	0		1	2021
-	none (cancelled)	1	2020	1	2020
Total		30	1985-2024	28	1985-2021

Legend : 10 cups won; (T) : title holder
