= 2013–14 LNH Division 1 =

LNH Division 1
- Season: 2013–14
- Champions: Dunkerque (1st title)
- Relegated: US Ivry; Dijon Bourgogne
- Champions League: Dunkerque; Paris Saint-Germain; Montpellier
- EHF Cup: Nantes; Fenix Toulouse
- Matches: 182
- Goals: 10,066 (55.31 per match)
- Top goalscorer: Dragan Gajić (192 goals)
- Biggest home win: PSG 41–22 Dijon
- Biggest away win: Aix 24–40 PSG
- Highest scoring: Saint-Raphaël 41–32 Aix

The 2013–14 LNH Division 1 is the 62nd season of the LNH Division 1, France's premier Handball league.

== Team information ==
Locations of the 2013–14 LNH Division 1

The following 14 clubs compete in the LNH Division 1 during the 2013–14 season:

| Team | Location | Arena | Capacity |
|---|---|---|---|
| Aix | Aix-en-Provence | Gymnase Val de l'Arc | 2,500 |
| Chambéry | Chambéry | Le Phare | 4,500 |
| Dijon Bourgogne | Dijon | Palais des Sports | 4,000 |
| Dunkerque | Dunkerque | Stade des Flandres | 2,400 |
| US Ivry | Ivry-sur-Seine | Gymnase Auguste Delaune | 1,500 |
| Montpellier | Montpellier | Palais des sports René-Bougnol; Park&Suites Arena | 3,000; 9,000 |
| Nantes | Nantes | Palais des Sports | 5,500 |
| USAM Nîmes | Nîmes | Le Parnasse | 4,191 |
| Paris Saint-Germain | Paris | Stade Pierre de Coubertin | 4,016 |
| Cesson-Rennes | Rennes | Palais des sports de la Valette; Le Liberté | 1,400; 4,000 |
| Saint-Raphaël | Saint-Raphaël | Palais des sports J-F Krakowski | 2,000 |
| Sélestat | Sélestat | CSI Sélestat; Rhénus Sport | 2,200; 5,500 |
| Toulouse | Toulouse | Palais des sports | 3,751 |
| Tremblay | Tremblay-en-France | Palais des sports | 1,200 |

=== Personnel and kits ===
Following is the list of clubs competing in 2013–14 LNH Division 1, with their manager, captain, kit manufacturer and shirt sponsor.

| Team | President | Head coach | Kit manufacturer | Shirt sponsor |
|---|---|---|---|---|
| Aix | Christian Salomez | (Croatia) Zvonimir Serdarušić | Kempa | GTM Sud |
| Chambéry | Alain Poncet | (France) Mario Cavalli | hummel | EDF Energy |
| Dijon Bourgogne | | (Romania) Elena Groposila | adidas | Eurogerm |
| Dunkerque | | (France) Patrick Cazal | Puma | GTS |
| US Ivry | Marc-Olivier Albertini | (France) Pascal Léandri | Erima | Eiffage |
| Montpellier | Rémy Lévy | (France) Patrice Canayer | ASICS | Montpellier Agglomération |
| Nantes | Gaël Pelletier | (France) Thierry Anti | hummel | Adim ouest |
| USAM Nîmes | David Tebib | (France) Jérôme Chauvet | Kappa | piscineprivee |
| Paris Saint-Germain | Nasser Al-Khelaifi | (France) Philippe Gardent | Nike | Gfi |
| Cesson-Rennes | Stéphane Clémenceau | (France) David Christmann | Kempa | Cesson-Sévigné |
| Saint-Raphaël | Jean-François Krakowski | (France) Christian Gaudin | hummel | Pizzorno |
| Sélestat | Vincent Mompert | (France) Jean-Luc Le Gall | Kempa | Reproland |
| Toulouse | Philippe Dallard | (France) Joël Da Silva | hummel | sotoulouse |
| Tremblay | | (Serbia) Dragan Zovko | hummel | Veolia |

== League table ==
| # | Team | Pld | W | D | L | GF | GA | Diff | Pts | Qualification or relegation |
|---|---|---|---|---|---|---|---|---|---|---|
| 1st place, gold medalist(s) | US Dunkerque (C) | 26 | 21 | 1 | 4 | 675 | 602 | +73 | 43 | 2014–15 EHF Champions League group stage |
| 2nd place, silver medalist(s) | Paris Saint-Germain | 26 | 19 | 2 | 5 | 825 | 730 | +95 | 40 | 2014–15 EHF Champions League group stage |
| 3rd place, bronze medalist(s) | Montpellier AHB | 26 | 19 | 2 | 5 | 824 | 703 | +121 | 38* | 2014–15 EHF Champions League group stage |
| 4 | HBC Nantes | 26 | 17 | 1 | 8 | 741 | 669 | +72 | 35 | 2014–15 EHF Cup round 2 |
| 5 | Fenix Toulouse | 26 | 16 | 1 | 9 | 730 | 702 | +28 | 33 | 2014–15 EHF Cup round 2 |
| 6 | Saint-Raphaël VHB | 26 | 14 | 1 | 11 | 752 | 756 | −4 | 29 | |
| 7 | Cesson-Rennes Métropole HB | 26 | 12 | 3 | 11 | 698 | 720 | −22 | 27 | |
| 8 | Chambéry SH | 26 | 13 | 1 | 12 | 766 | 744 | +22 | 27 | |
| 9 | Pays d'Aix UCH | 26 | 8 | 3 | 15 | 680 | 750 | −70 | 19 | |
| 10 | USAM Nîmes | 26 | 9 | 1 | 16 | 694 | 728 | −34 | 19 | |
| 11 | Sélestat AHB | 26 | 7 | 3 | 16 | 713 | 767 | −54 | 17 | |
| 12 | Tremblay-en-France Handball | 26 | 6 | 3 | 17 | 672 | 750 | −78 | 15 | |
| 13 | US Ivry (R) | 26 | 4 | 3 | 19 | 660 | 715 | −55 | 11 | Relegation to the 2014–15 LNH Division 2 |
| 14 | Dijon Bourgogne Handball (R) | 26 | 3 | 3 | 20 | 636 | 730 | −94 | 9 | Relegation to the 2014–15 LNH Division 2 |

Pld - Played; W - Won; L - Lost; PF - Points for; PA - Points against; Diff - Difference; Pts - Points.
(C) = Champion; (R) = Relegated; (P) = Promoted; (E) = Eliminated; (O) = Play-off winner; (A) = Advances to a further round.

LNH Division 1 2013–14
Champions

US Dunkerque
1st Title

Team roster

1 Vincent Gérard, 3 Benjamin Afgour, 4 Bastien Lamon, 6 Kornél Nagy, 7 Jaleleddine Touati, 9 Théophile Caussé, 10 Erwan Siakam-Kadji, 15 Pierre Soudry, 16 William Annotel, 17 Julian Emonet, 19 Romain Guillard, 21 Mickaël Grocaut, 26 Guillaume Joli, 46 Mohamed Mokrani 57 Baptiste Butto and 89 Espen Lie Hansen
Head coach: Patrick Cazal

=== Schedule and results ===
In the table below the home teams are listed on the left and the away teams along the top.

| | Aix | Chamb. | Dijon | Dunk. | Ivry | Mon. | Nant. | Nîmes | Paris | Cess. | St-Ra. | Sél. | Toul. | Tremb. |
|---|---|---|---|---|---|---|---|---|---|---|---|---|---|---|
| Pays d'Aix UC | | 27–30 | 33–33 | 25–27 | 35–28 | 28–29 | 22–27 | 29–26 | 24–40 | 25–25 | 26–25 | 28–28 | 25–22 | 30–28 |
| Chambéry SH | 32–24 | | 36–30 | 21–17 | 32–24 | 33–30 | 32–28 | 35–25 | 31–26 | 26–31 | 33–34 | 31–30 | 30–31 | 26–29 |
| Dijon BH | 21–18 | 28–32 | | 20–25 | 25–25 | 22–26 | 19–27 | 22–24 | 28–30 | 27–26 | 25–25 | 26–31 | 23–27 | 26–29 |
| US Dunkerque | 27–20 | 26–32 | 26–25 | | 25–22 | 25–25 | 24–25 | 27–17 | 25–21 | 26–23 | 23–25 | 30–22 | 31–27 | 30–24 |
| US Ivry | 20–21 | 24–22 | 25–24 | 22–23 | | 25–30 | 24–29 | 29–23 | 23–26 | 28–28 | 28–30 | 26–28 | 28–30 | 25–26 |
| Montpellier AHB | 40–28 | 40–30 | 27–22 | 25–26 | 35–31 | | 31–26 | 27–26 | 36–28 | 32–24 | 36–31 | 39–28 | 36–25 | 29–21 |
| HBC Nantes | 26–25 | 32–23 | 34–26 | 19–22 | 32–25 | 29–29 | | 22–37 | 30–26 | 29–22 | 31–27 | 32–27 | 29–30 | 34–25 |
| USAM Nîmes | 24–25 | 34–29 | 31–24 | 23–25 | 29–27 | 23–27 | 29–28 | | 22–29 | 22–27 | 25–30 | 31–30 | 29–25 | 37–26 |
| Paris Saint-Germain | 39–30 | 30–29 | 41–22 | 25–27 | 34–29 | 30–29 | 30–28 | 35–32 | | 34–27 | 32–24 | 37–34 | 32–28 | 29–23 |
| Cesson Rennes HB | 30–26 | 30–30 | 28–27 | 25–30 | 24–21 | 27–32 | 18–24 | 24–22 | 28–41 | | 32–27 | 29–26 | 28–27 | 30–26 |
| Saint-Raphaël VHB | 41–32 | 28–27 | 26–18 | 21–30 | 31–23 | 31–30 | 27–31 | 35–33 | 31–36 | 26–25 | | 36–33 | 28–29 | 29–26 |
| Sélestat AHB | 30–31 | 28–26 | 25–21 | 21–24 | 25–31 | 24–41 | 23–32 | 30–27 | 32–32 | 28–20 | 26–30 | | 27–28 | 24–24 |
| Fenix Toulouse | 27–19 | 30–31 | 30–26 | 21–24 | 25–24 | 23–28 | 31–27 | 34–26 | 29–29 | 34–30 | 30–22 | 31–22 | | 29–25 |
| Tremblay-en-France | 25–24 | 28–27 | 23–26 | 26–30 | 23–23 | 27–35 | 25–30 | 27–27 | 29–33 | 24–27 | 36–32 | 24–31 | 23–27 | |

== Statistics ==
=== Top goalscorers ===
| # | Player | Goals | Team |
|---|---|---|---|
| 1 | (Slovenia) Dragan Gajić | 192 | Montpellier |
| 2 | (Spain) Valero Rivera Folch | 173 | Nantes |
| 3 | (France) Jérôme Fernandez | 169 | Toulouse |
| 4 | (France) Pierrick Naudin | 154 | Dijon |
| 4 | (France) Guillaume Saurina | 154 | USAM Nîmes |
| 6 | (France) Raphaël Caucheteux | 142 | Saint-Raphaël |
| 7 | (Denmark) Morten Olsen | 137 | Saint-Raphaël |
| 8 | (France) Baptiste Butto | 133 | Dunkerque |
| 9 | (Serbia) Nemanja Ilić | 132 | Toulouse |
| 10 | (Montenegro) Fahrudin Melić | 126 | PSG |

== Number of teams by regions ==
| # | Region | No. teams | Teams |
|---|---|---|---|
| 1 | Île-de-France | 3 | US Ivry, Paris Saint-Germain and Tremblay |
| 2 | Languedoc-Roussillon | 2 | Montpellier and USAM Nîmes |
| 2 | Provence-Alpes-Côte d'Azur | 2 | Aix and Saint-Raphaël |
| 4 | Alsace | 1 | Sélestat |
| 4 | Brittany | 1 | Cesson-Rennes |
| 4 | Burgundy | 1 | Dijon Bourgogne |
| 4 | Nord-Pas-de-Calais | 1 | Dunkerque |
| 4 | Midi-Pyrénées | 1 | Toulouse |
| 4 | Pays de la Loire | 1 | Nantes |
| 4 | Rhône-Alpes | 1 | Chambéry |
