= 2001 World Men's Handball Championship =

Tournament details
- Host country: France
- Venues: 9 (in 9 host cities)
- Dates: 23 January – 4 February
- Teams: 24

Final positions
- Champions: France (2nd title)
- Runners-up: Sweden
- Third place: Yugoslavia
- Fourth place: Egypt

Tournament statistics
- Matches played: 80
- Goals scored: 4,003 (50.04 per match)
- Top scorers: Eduard Koksharov (RUS) (61 goals)

Awards
- Best player: Stefan Lövgren (SWE)

The 2001 World Men's Handball Championship took place in France from 23 January to 4 February 2001. It was the 17th edition of the World Championship in team handball and the hosts won the championship.

== Venues ==
9 cities were hosts for the tournament. The final match took place in the capital Paris.

Town	Stadium	max. spectators
Paris	Palais Omnisports de Paris-Bercy	13.500
Amnéville	Galaxie Amnéville	6.000
Besançon	Palais des Sports	6.000
Albertville	La halle de glace Olympique	5.700
Marseille	Palais des Sports	5.600
Toulouse	Palais des Sports	5.000
Nantes	Palais des Sports de Beaulieu	4.600
Montpellier	Palais des sports René-Bougnol	3.000
Dunkerque	Stade des Flandres	2.400

Paris	Amnéville	Besançon	Albertville
Palais Omnisports de Paris-Bercy	Galaxie	Palais des Sports	La halle de glace Olympique
Capacity: 13,500	Capacity: 6,000	Capacity: 6,000	Capacity: 5,700
Marseille	2001 World Men's Handball Championship is located in France		
Palais des Sports	2001 World Men's Handball Championship is located in France		
Capacity: 5,600	2001 World Men's Handball Championship is located in France		
Toulouse	Nantes	Montpellier	Dunkerque
Palais des Sports	Palais des Sports de Beaulieu	Palais des sports René-Bougnol	Stade des Flandres
Capacity: 5,000	Capacity: 4,600	Capacity: 3,000	Capacity: 2,400

== Qualification ==
Competition	Dates	Vacancies	Qualified
Host nation		1	France
1999 World Men's Handball Championship	1–15 June 1999	1	Sweden
2000 European Men's Handball Championship	21–30 January 2000	4	Russia; Spain; Slovenia; Croatia
2000 African Men's Handball Championship	22 April – 1 May 2000	4	Egypt; Algeria; Tunisia; Morocco
2000 Pan American Men's Handball Championship	23–28 May 2000	4	Argentina; Brazil; United States; Greenland
European qualification	15 December 1999 – 11 June 2000	6+1	Czech Republic; Germany; Iceland; Norway; Portugal; Ukraine; Yugoslavia
Asian qualification	12–27 August 2000	3	Kuwait; Saudi Arabia; South Korea

== First round ==
The first four teams of each group qualify for the round of 16.

=== Group A ===
Pos	Team	Pld	W	D	L	GF	GA	GD	Pts	Qualification
1	Sweden	5	5	0	0	147	112	+35	10	Round of 16
2	Egypt	5	3	1	1	124	115	+9	7	Round of 16
3	Iceland	5	2	1	2	125	119	+6	5	Round of 16
4	Portugal	5	2	0	3	122	122	0	4 (Note: Portugal 29–19 Czech Republic)	Round of 16
5	Czech Republic	5	1	2	2	136	136	0	4	
6	Morocco	5	0	0	5	112	162	−50	0	

Source: IHF
Notes:

23 January 2001; 14:30	Egypt	28–19	Morocco	Palais des sports René-Bougnol, Montpellier; Attendance: 3,000; Referees: Josić, Rudić (CRO)
23 January 2001; 14:30		(14–6)		Palais des sports René-Bougnol, Montpellier; Attendance: 3,000; Referees: Josić, Rudić (CRO)

23 January 2001; 18:30	Portugal	29–19	Czech Republic	Palais des sports René-Bougnol, Montpellier; Referees: Lemme, Ullrich (GER)
23 January 2001; 18:30		(14–10)		Palais des sports René-Bougnol, Montpellier; Referees: Lemme, Ullrich (GER)

23 January 2001; 20:30	Sweden	24–21	Iceland	Palais des sports René-Bougnol, Montpellier; Referees: Boye, Jensen (DEN)
23 January 2001; 20:30		(13–9)		Palais des sports René-Bougnol, Montpellier; Referees: Boye, Jensen (DEN)

24 January 2001; 16:30	Czech Republic	26–26	Egypt	Palais des sports René-Bougnol, Montpellier; Attendance: 1,000; Referees: Breto, Huelin (ESP)
24 January 2001; 16:30		(16–14)		Palais des sports René-Bougnol, Montpellier; Attendance: 1,000; Referees: Breto, Huelin (ESP)

24 January 2001; 18:30	Iceland	22–19	Portugal	Palais des sports René-Bougnol, Montpellier; Attendance: 2,000; Referees: Josić, Rudić (CRO)
24 January 2001; 18:30		(10–11)		Palais des sports René-Bougnol, Montpellier; Attendance: 2,000; Referees: Josić, Rudić (CRO)

24 January 2001; 20:30	Morocco	21–33	Sweden	Palais des sports René-Bougnol, Montpellier; Attendance: 1,000; Referees: Lemme, Ullrich (GER)
24 January 2001; 20:30		(11–21)		Palais des sports René-Bougnol, Montpellier; Attendance: 1,000; Referees: Lemme, Ullrich (GER)

25 January 2001; 16:30	Egypt	23–19	Portugal	Palais des sports René-Bougnol, Montpellier; Attendance: 2,500; Referees: Boye, Jensen (DEN)
25 January 2001; 16:30		(9–10)		Palais des sports René-Bougnol, Montpellier; Attendance: 2,500; Referees: Boye, Jensen (DEN)

25 January 2001; 18:30	Morocco	23–31	Iceland	Palais des sports René-Bougnol, Montpellier; Attendance: 1,000; Referees: Breto, Huelin (ESP)
25 January 2001; 18:30		(13–16)		Palais des sports René-Bougnol, Montpellier; Attendance: 1,000; Referees: Breto, Huelin (ESP)

25 January 2001; 20:30	Sweden	29–22	Czech Republic	Palais des sports René-Bougnol, Montpellier; Attendance: 2,500; Referees: Josić, Rudić (CRO)
25 January 2001; 20:30		(15–10)		Palais des sports René-Bougnol, Montpellier; Attendance: 2,500; Referees: Josić, Rudić (CRO)

27 January 2001; 14:00	Czech Republic	40–23	Morocco	Palais des sports René-Bougnol, Montpellier; Attendance: 3,000; Referees: Boye, Jensen (DEN)
27 January 2001; 14:00		(22–9)		Palais des sports René-Bougnol, Montpellier; Attendance: 3,000; Referees: Boye, Jensen (DEN)

27 January 2001; 16:00	Portugal	25–32	Sweden	Palais des sports René-Bougnol, Montpellier; Attendance: 2,500; Referees: Lemme, Ullrich (GER)
27 January 2001; 16:00		(12–16)		Palais des sports René-Bougnol, Montpellier; Attendance: 2,500; Referees: Lemme, Ullrich (GER)

27 January 2001; 18:00	Egypt	24–22	Iceland	Palais des sports René-Bougnol, Montpellier; Attendance: 2,500; Referees: Breto, Huelin (ESP)
27 January 2001; 18:00		(12–7)		Palais des sports René-Bougnol, Montpellier; Attendance: 2,500; Referees: Breto, Huelin (ESP)

28 January 2001; 14:00	Portugal	30–26	Morocco	Palais des sports René-Bougnol, Montpellier; Attendance: 3,000; Referees: Breto, Huelin (ESP)
28 January 2001; 14:00		(11–13)		Palais des sports René-Bougnol, Montpellier; Attendance: 3,000; Referees: Breto, Huelin (ESP)

28 January 2001; 16:00	Iceland	29–29	Czech Republic	Palais des sports René-Bougnol, Montpellier; Attendance: 3,000; Referees: Lemme, Ullrich (GER)
28 January 2001; 16:00		(15–12)		Palais des sports René-Bougnol, Montpellier; Attendance: 3,000; Referees: Lemme, Ullrich (GER)

28 January 2001; 18:00	Sweden	29–23	Egypt	Palais des sports René-Bougnol, Montpellier; Attendance: 3,000; Referees: Josić, Rudić (CRO)
28 January 2001; 18:00		(14–7)		Palais des sports René-Bougnol, Montpellier; Attendance: 3,000; Referees: Josić, Rudić (CRO)

=== Group B ===
Pos	Team	Pld	W	D	L	GF	GA	GD	Pts	Qualification
1	France (H)	5	5	0	0	132	85	+47	10	Round of 16
2	Yugoslavia	5	4	0	1	146	89	+57	8	Round of 16
3	Algeria	5	2	1	2	107	102	+5	5 (Note: Argentina 23–23 Algeria)	Round of 16
4	Argentina	5	2	1	2	94	118	−24	5	Round of 16
5	Brazil	5	1	0	4	108	124	−16	2	
6	Kuwait	5	0	0	5	76	145	−69	0	

Source: IHF
(H) Hosts
Notes:

23 January 2001; 14:00	Argentina	22–16	Kuwait	Palais des Sports de Beaulieu, Nantes; Attendance: 5,000; Referees: Vakula, Liudovyk (UKR)
23 January 2001; 14:00		(14–9)		Palais des Sports de Beaulieu, Nantes; Attendance: 5,000; Referees: Vakula, Liudovyk (UKR)

23 January 2001; 18:00	France	23–13	Algeria	Palais des Sports de Beaulieu, Nantes; Attendance: 4,400; Referees: Øie, Hogsnes (NOR)
23 January 2001; 18:00		(10–4)		Palais des Sports de Beaulieu, Nantes; Attendance: 4,400; Referees: Øie, Hogsnes (NOR)

23 January 2001; 20:00	Yugoslavia	31–23	Brazil	Palais des Sports de Beaulieu, Nantes; Attendance: 5,000; Referees: Al-Janahe, Rasheed (KSA)
23 January 2001; 20:00		(15–12)		Palais des Sports de Beaulieu, Nantes; Attendance: 5,000; Referees: Al-Janahe, Rasheed (KSA)

24 January 2001; 16:00	Brazil	19–20	Argentina	Palais des Sports de Beaulieu, Nantes; Attendance: 5,000; Referees: Øie, Hogsnes (NOR)
24 January 2001; 16:00		(10–8)		Palais des Sports de Beaulieu, Nantes; Attendance: 5,000; Referees: Øie, Hogsnes (NOR)

24 January 2001; 18:00	Kuwait	14–30	France	Palais des Sports de Beaulieu, Nantes; Referees: Rosskamp, Rothkranz (BEL)
24 January 2001; 18:00		(8–14)		Palais des Sports de Beaulieu, Nantes; Referees: Rosskamp, Rothkranz (BEL)

24 January 2001; 20:00	Algeria	20–23	Yugoslavia	Palais des Sports de Beaulieu, Nantes; Attendance: 5,000; Referees: Vakula, Liudovyk (UKR)
24 January 2001; 20:00		(7–14)		Palais des Sports de Beaulieu, Nantes; Attendance: 5,000; Referees: Vakula, Liudovyk (UKR)

25 January 2001; 16:00	Kuwait	13–26	Algeria	Palais des Sports de Beaulieu, Nantes; Attendance: 4,010; Referees: Øie, Hogsnes (NOR)
25 January 2001; 16:00		(3–13)		Palais des Sports de Beaulieu, Nantes; Attendance: 4,010; Referees: Øie, Hogsnes (NOR)

25 January 2001; 18:00	France	29–19	Brazil	Palais des Sports de Beaulieu, Nantes; Attendance: 5,000; Referees: Al-Janahe, Rasheed (KSA)
25 January 2001; 18:00		(14–10)		Palais des Sports de Beaulieu, Nantes; Attendance: 5,000; Referees: Al-Janahe, Rasheed (KSA)

25 January 2001; 20:00	Argentina	10–32	Yugoslavia	Palais des Sports de Beaulieu, Nantes; Attendance: 5,000; Referees: Rosskamp, Rothkranz (BEL)
25 January 2001; 20:00		(2–15)		Palais des Sports de Beaulieu, Nantes; Attendance: 5,000; Referees: Rosskamp, Rothkranz (BEL)

27 January 2001; 14:00	Argentina	23–23	Algeria	Palais des Sports de Beaulieu, Nantes; Attendance: 5,000; Referees: Vakula, Liudovyk (UKR)
27 January 2001; 14:00		(8–11)		Palais des Sports de Beaulieu, Nantes; Attendance: 5,000; Referees: Vakula, Liudovyk (UKR)

27 January 2001; 16:00	Brazil	27–19	Kuwait	Palais des Sports de Beaulieu, Nantes; Attendance: 5,000; Referees: Rosskamp, Rothkranz (BEL)
27 January 2001; 16:00		(15–7)		Palais des Sports de Beaulieu, Nantes; Attendance: 5,000; Referees: Rosskamp, Rothkranz (BEL)

27 January 2001; 18:00	Yugoslavia	20–22	France	Palais des Sports de Beaulieu, Nantes; Attendance: 5,000; Referees: Øie, Hogsnes (NOR)
27 January 2001; 18:00		(8–13)		Palais des Sports de Beaulieu, Nantes; Attendance: 5,000; Referees: Øie, Hogsnes (NOR)

28 January 2001; 14:00	Algeria	25–20	Brazil	Palais des Sports de Beaulieu, Nantes; Attendance: 4,000; Referees: Vakula, Liudovyk (UKR)
28 January 2001; 14:00		(11–8)		Palais des Sports de Beaulieu, Nantes; Attendance: 4,000; Referees: Vakula, Liudovyk (UKR)

28 January 2001; 16:00	Yugoslavia	40–14	Kuwait	Palais des Sports de Beaulieu, Nantes; Attendance: 5,000; Referees: Al-Janahe, Rasheed (KSA)
28 January 2001; 16:00		(21–6)		Palais des Sports de Beaulieu, Nantes; Attendance: 5,000; Referees: Al-Janahe, Rasheed (KSA)

28 January 2001; 18:00	France	28–19	Argentina	Palais des Sports de Beaulieu, Nantes; Attendance: 5,000; Referees: Vakula, Liudovyk (UKR)
28 January 2001; 18:00		(14–11)		Palais des Sports de Beaulieu, Nantes; Attendance: 5,000; Referees: Vakula, Liudovyk (UKR)

=== Group C ===
Pos	Team	Pld	W	D	L	GF	GA	GD	Pts	Qualification
1	Spain	5	4	0	1	160	105	+55	8	Round of 16
2	Germany	5	3	1	1	157	100	+57	7 (Note: Croatia 23–23 Germany)	Round of 16
3	Croatia	5	3	1	1	154	115	+39	7	Round of 16
4	South Korea	5	3	0	2	145	132	+13	6	Round of 16
5	Greenland	5	1	0	4	85	140	−55	2	
6	United States	5	0	0	5	80	189	−109	0	

Source: IHF
Notes:

23 January 2001; 14:30	Croatia	25–15	Greenland	Palais des Sports, Besançon; Attendance: 3,000; Referees: Nachevski, Nachevski (MKD)
23 January 2001; 14:30		(12–6)		Palais des Sports, Besançon; Attendance: 3,000; Referees: Nachevski, Nachevski (MKD)

23 January 2001; 18:30	Germany	40–12	United States	Palais des Sports, Besançon; Attendance: 3,000; Referees: Mbengue, Sèye (SEN)
23 January 2001; 18:30		(19–6)		Palais des Sports, Besançon; Attendance: 3,000; Referees: Mbengue, Sèye (SEN)

23 January 2001; 20:30	Spain	26–17	South Korea	Palais des Sports, Besançon; Attendance: 3,000; Referees: Hansson, Olsson (SWE)
23 January 2001; 20:30		(13–9)		Palais des Sports, Besançon; Attendance: 3,000; Referees: Hansson, Olsson (SWE)

24 January 2001; 16:30	Greenland	16–31	Spain	Palais des Sports, Besançon; Attendance: 2,500; Referees: Mbengue, Sèye (SEN)
24 January 2001; 16:30		(10–17)		Palais des Sports, Besançon; Attendance: 2,500; Referees: Mbengue, Sèye (SEN)

24 January 2001; 18:30	United States	12–41	Croatia	Palais des Sports, Besançon; Attendance: 2,800; Referees: Hussain, Haider (KUW)
24 January 2001; 18:30		(5–21)		Palais des Sports, Besançon; Attendance: 2,800; Referees: Hussain, Haider (KUW)

24 January 2001; 20:30	South Korea	26–33	Germany	Palais des Sports, Besançon; Attendance: 3,000; Referees: Nachevski, Nachevski (MKD)
24 January 2001; 20:30		(14–16)		Palais des Sports, Besançon; Attendance: 3,000; Referees: Nachevski, Nachevski (MKD)

25 January 2001; 16:30	Spain	45–18	United States	Palais des Sports, Besançon; Attendance: 2,000; Referees: Hussain, Haider (KUW)
25 January 2001; 16:30		(19–10)		Palais des Sports, Besançon; Attendance: 2,000; Referees: Hussain, Haider (KUW)

25 January 2001; 18:30	Greenland	20–27	South Korea	Palais des Sports, Besançon; Attendance: 3,000; Referees: Nachevski, Nachevski (MKD)
25 January 2001; 18:30		(10–11)		Palais des Sports, Besançon; Attendance: 3,000; Referees: Nachevski, Nachevski (MKD)

25 January 2001; 20:30	Croatia	23–23	Germany	Palais des Sports, Besançon; Attendance: 3,200; Referees: Hansson, Olsson (SWE)
25 January 2001; 20:30		(12–13)		Palais des Sports, Besançon; Attendance: 3,200; Referees: Hansson, Olsson (SWE)

27 January 2001; 14:00	United States	18–26	Greenland	Palais des Sports, Besançon; Attendance: 2,500; Referees: Hansson, Olsson (SWE)
27 January 2001; 14:00		(8–11)		Palais des Sports, Besançon; Attendance: 2,500; Referees: Hansson, Olsson (SWE)

27 January 2001; 16:00	Germany	22–31	Spain	Palais des Sports, Besançon; Attendance: 3,200; Referees: Nachevski, Nachevski (MKD)
27 January 2001; 16:00		(11–15)		Palais des Sports, Besançon; Attendance: 3,200; Referees: Nachevski, Nachevski (MKD)

27 January 2001; 18:00	Croatia	33–38	South Korea	Palais des Sports, Besançon; Attendance: 3,000; Referees: Hussain, Haider (KUW)
27 January 2001; 18:00		(18–16)		Palais des Sports, Besançon; Attendance: 3,000; Referees: Hussain, Haider (KUW)

28 January 2001; 14:00	Germany	39–8	Greenland	Palais des Sports, Besançon; Attendance: 2,500; Referees: Hussain, Haider (KUW)
28 January 2001; 14:00		(21–5)		Palais des Sports, Besançon; Attendance: 2,500; Referees: Hussain, Haider (KUW)

28 January 2001; 16:00	South Korea	37–20	United States	Palais des Sports, Besançon; Attendance: 3,000; Referees: Mbengue, Sèye (SEN)
28 January 2001; 16:00		(17–9)		Palais des Sports, Besançon; Attendance: 3,000; Referees: Mbengue, Sèye (SEN)

28 January 2001; 18:00	Spain	27–32	Croatia	Palais des Sports, Besançon; Attendance: 3,200; Referees: Hansson, Olsson (SWE)
28 January 2001; 18:00		(9–16)		Palais des Sports, Besançon; Attendance: 3,200; Referees: Hansson, Olsson (SWE)

=== Group D ===
Pos	Team	Pld	W	D	L	GF	GA	GD	Pts	Qualification
1	Russia	5	4	1	0	140	120	+20	9	Round of 16
2	Ukraine	5	3	0	2	134	115	+19	6 (Note: Ukraine 24–18 Tunisia)	Round of 16
3	Tunisia	5	3	0	2	116	110	+6	6	Round of 16
4	Norway	5	2	1	2	116	127	−11	5	Round of 16
5	Slovenia	5	2	0	3	145	137	+8	4	
6	Saudi Arabia	5	0	0	5	92	134	−42	0	

Source: IHF
Notes:

23 January 2001; 13:30	Slovenia	28–24	Ukraine	Stade des Flandres, Dunkerque; Attendance: 2,500; Referees: Goulão, Macau (POR)
23 January 2001; 13:30		(16–8)		Stade des Flandres, Dunkerque; Attendance: 2,500; Referees: Goulão, Macau (POR)

23 January 2001; 17:30	Russia	23–20	Tunisia	Stade des Flandres, Dunkerque; Attendance: 2,000; Referees: Garcia, Moreno (FRA)
23 January 2001; 17:30		(13–13)		Stade des Flandres, Dunkerque; Attendance: 2,000; Referees: Garcia, Moreno (FRA)

23 January 2001; 19:30	Norway	20–14	Saudi Arabia	Stade des Flandres, Dunkerque; Attendance: 2,500; Referees: Bord, Buy (FRA)
23 January 2001; 19:30		(9–8)		Stade des Flandres, Dunkerque; Attendance: 2,500; Referees: Bord, Buy (FRA)

24 January 2001; 15:30	Saudi Arabia	22–35	Slovenia	Stade des Flandres, Dunkerque; Attendance: 1,700; Referees: Garcia, Moreno (FRA)
24 January 2001; 15:30		(13–17)		Stade des Flandres, Dunkerque; Attendance: 1,700; Referees: Garcia, Moreno (FRA)

24 January 2001; 17:30	Ukraine	27–30	Russia	Stade des Flandres, Dunkerque; Attendance: 2,500; Referees: Arnaldsson, Viðarsson (ISL)
24 January 2001; 17:30		(12–16)		Stade des Flandres, Dunkerque; Attendance: 2,500; Referees: Arnaldsson, Viðarsson (ISL)

24 January 2001; 19:30	Tunisia	28–19	Norway	Stade des Flandres, Dunkerque; Attendance: 2,500; Referees: Goulão, Macau (POR)
24 January 2001; 19:30		(17–6)		Stade des Flandres, Dunkerque; Attendance: 2,500; Referees: Goulão, Macau (POR)

25 January 2001; 15:30	Ukraine	24–18	Tunisia	Stade des Flandres, Dunkerque; Attendance: 1,500; Referees: Bord, Buy (FRA)
25 January 2001; 15:30		(10–11)		Stade des Flandres, Dunkerque; Attendance: 1,500; Referees: Bord, Buy (FRA)

25 January 2001; 17:30	Russia	29–18	Saudi Arabia	Stade des Flandres, Dunkerque; Attendance: 2,000; Referees: Goulão, Macau (POR)
25 January 2001; 17:30		(17–10)		Stade des Flandres, Dunkerque; Attendance: 2,000; Referees: Goulão, Macau (POR)

25 January 2001; 19:30	Slovenia	29–30	Norway	Stade des Flandres, Dunkerque; Attendance: 2,500; Referees: Arnaldsson, Viðarsson (ISL)
25 January 2001; 19:30		(12–18)		Stade des Flandres, Dunkerque; Attendance: 2,500; Referees: Arnaldsson, Viðarsson (ISL)

27 January 2001; 14:00	Saudi Arabia	17–28	Ukraine	Stade des Flandres, Dunkerque; Attendance: 2,500; Referees: Arnaldsson, Viðarsson (ISL)
27 January 2001; 14:00		(9–14)		Stade des Flandres, Dunkerque; Attendance: 2,500; Referees: Arnaldsson, Viðarsson (ISL)

27 January 2001; 16:00	Norway	25–25	Russia	Stade des Flandres, Dunkerque; Attendance: 2,500; Referees: Bord, Buy (FRA)
27 January 2001; 16:00		(9–12)		Stade des Flandres, Dunkerque; Attendance: 2,500; Referees: Bord, Buy (FRA)

27 January 2001; 18:00	Slovenia	23–28	Tunisia	Stade des Flandres, Dunkerque; Attendance: 2,400; Referees: Garcia, Moreno (FRA)
27 January 2001; 18:00		(10–13)		Stade des Flandres, Dunkerque; Attendance: 2,400; Referees: Garcia, Moreno (FRA)

28 January 2001; 14:00	Tunisia	22–21	Saudi Arabia	Stade des Flandres, Dunkerque; Attendance: 2,500; Referees: Arnaldsson, Viðarsson (ISL)
28 January 2001; 14:00		(11–10)		Stade des Flandres, Dunkerque; Attendance: 2,500; Referees: Arnaldsson, Viðarsson (ISL)

28 January 2001; 16:00	Norway	22–31	Ukraine	Stade des Flandres, Dunkerque; Attendance: 2,500; Referees: Garcia, Moreno (FRA)
28 January 2001; 16:00		(9–14)		Stade des Flandres, Dunkerque; Attendance: 2,500; Referees: Garcia, Moreno (FRA)

28 January 2001; 18:00	Russia	33–30	Slovenia	Stade des Flandres, Dunkerque; Attendance: 2,500; Referees: Goulão, Macau (POR)
28 January 2001; 18:00		(15–15)		Stade des Flandres, Dunkerque; Attendance: 2,500; Referees: Goulão, Macau (POR)

== Knockout stage ==
=== Bracket ===
Championship bracket

Round of 16
31 January
Sweden	32
Argentina	23
31 January
Croatia	34
Ukraine (ET)	37
31 January
Spain	28
Norway	23
31 January
Iceland	27
Yugoslavia	31
31 January
Tunisia	24
Germany	26
31 January
France	23
Portugal	18
31 January
Algeria	21
Egypt	24
31 January
Russia	28
South Korea	26

Quarterfinals
1 February
Sweden	34
Ukraine	20
1 February
Spain	24
Yugoslavia	26
1 February
Germany	23
France (ET)	26
1 February
Egypt	21
Russia	19

Semifinals
3 February
Sweden	25
Yugoslavia	24
3 February
France	24
Egypt	21

Final
4 February
Sweden	25
France (ET)	28
Third place
4 February
Yugoslavia	27
Egypt	17

5th place bracket

5–8th place semifinals
3 February
Ukraine	23
Spain	24
3 February
Germany	29
Russia	33

Fifth place
4 February
Spain (ET)	40
Russia	38
Seventh place
4 February
Ukraine	30
Germany	24

=== Round of 16 ===
31 January 2001; 17:00	France	23–18	Portugal	La halle de glace Olympique, Albertville
31 January 2001; 17:00		(10–10)		La halle de glace Olympique, Albertville

31 January 2001; 17:30	Algeria	21–24	Egypt	Galaxie Amnéville, Amnéville
31 January 2001; 17:30		(9–12)		Galaxie Amnéville, Amnéville

31 January 2001
18:00
Croatia
34–37 (ET)
Ukraine
Palais des Sports de Marseille, Marseille

(11–11)

FT: 29–29 ET: 4–4, 1–4

31 January 2001; 18:00	Iceland	27–31	Yugoslavia	Palais des sports, Toulouse
31 January 2001; 18:00		(10–15)		Palais des sports, Toulouse

31 January 2001; 19:30	Tunisia	24–26	Germany	La halle de glace Olympique, Albertville
31 January 2001; 19:30		(11–15)		La halle de glace Olympique, Albertville

31 January 2001; 20:30	Russia	28–26	South Korea	Galaxie Amnéville, Amnéville
31 January 2001; 20:30		(11–12)		Galaxie Amnéville, Amnéville

31 January 2001; 20:30	Sweden	32–23	Argentina	Palais des Sports de Marseille, Marseille
31 January 2001; 20:30		(18–10)		Palais des Sports de Marseille, Marseille

31 January 2001; 20:30	Spain	28–23	Norway	Palais des sports, Toulouse
31 January 2001; 20:30		(16–11)		Palais des sports, Toulouse

=== Places 9th to 16th ===
For places 9–16 the criterion was the number of points gained against the teams ranked first to fourth in the preliminary round in their group.

Pos	Team	Pld	W	D	L	GF	GA	GD	Pts
9	Croatia	3	1	1	1	88	88	0	3
10	Tunisia	3	1	0	2	66	66	0	2
11	Iceland	3	1	0	2	65	67	−2	2
12	South Korea	3	1	0	2	81	92	−11	2
13	Algeria	3	0	1	2	56	69	−13	1
14	Norway	3	0	1	2	66	84	−18	1
15	Argentina	3	0	1	2	52	83	−31	1
16	Portugal	3	0	0	3	63	77	−14	0

Rules for classification: 1) points; 2) goal difference; 3) number of goals scored.

=== Quarterfinals ===
1 February 2001
20:30
Germany
23–26 (ET)
France
La halle de glace Olympique, Albertville

(8–11)

FT: 22–22 ET: 1–4

1 February 2001; 20:30	Egypt	21–19	Russia	Galaxie Amnéville, Amnéville
1 February 2001; 20:30		(9–7)		Galaxie Amnéville, Amnéville

1 February 2001; 20:30	Spain	24–26	Yugoslavia	Palais des sports, Toulouse
1 February 2001; 20:30		(10–13)		Palais des sports, Toulouse

1 February 2001; 20:30	Sweden	34–20	Ukraine	Palais des Sports de Marseille, Marseille
1 February 2001; 20:30		(14–9)		Palais des Sports de Marseille, Marseille

=== 5–8th place semifinals ===
3 February 2001; 09:30	Ukraine	23–24	Spain	Palais Omnisports de Paris-Bercy, Paris
3 February 2001; 09:30		(7–14)		Palais Omnisports de Paris-Bercy, Paris

3 February 2001; 12:00	Germany	29–33	Russia	Palais Omnisports de Paris-Bercy, Paris
3 February 2001; 12:00		(16–17)		Palais Omnisports de Paris-Bercy, Paris

=== Semifinals ===
3 February 2001	Sweden	25–24	Yugoslavia	Palais Omnisports de Paris-Bercy, Paris; Attendance: 13,500; Referees: Nachevski, Nachevski (MKD)
3 February 2001	Lövgren 11	(14–9)	Jovanović 5	Palais Omnisports de Paris-Bercy, Paris; Attendance: 13,500; Referees: Nachevski, Nachevski (MKD)
3 February 2001		Report		Palais Omnisports de Paris-Bercy, Paris; Attendance: 13,500; Referees: Nachevski, Nachevski (MKD)

3 February 2001	France	24–21	Egypt	Palais Omnisports de Paris-Bercy, Paris; Attendance: 13,500; Referees: Boye, Jensen (DEN)
3 February 2001	Anquetil 7	(8–10)	Zaky 8	Palais Omnisports de Paris-Bercy, Paris; Attendance: 13,500; Referees: Boye, Jensen (DEN)
3 February 2001	7× (suspension)	Report	8× (suspension)	Palais Omnisports de Paris-Bercy, Paris; Attendance: 13,500; Referees: Boye, Jensen (DEN)

=== Seventh place game ===
4 February 2001	Ukraine	30–24	Germany	Palais Omnisports de Paris-Bercy, Paris
4 February 2001	Kostetsky 14	(17–8)	Baur 8	Palais Omnisports de Paris-Bercy, Paris
4 February 2001		Report		Palais Omnisports de Paris-Bercy, Paris

=== Fifth place game ===
4 February 2001
Spain
40–38 (ET)
Russia
Palais Omnisports de Paris-Bercy, Paris
Ortega 10
(18–15)
Koksharov, Krivoshlykov 6

Report

FT: 35–35 ET: 5–3

=== Third place game ===
4 February 2001	FR Yugoslavia	27–17	Egypt	Palais Omnisports de Paris-Bercy, Paris; Referees: Lemme, Ulrich (GER)
4 February 2001	Škrbić 9	(11–8)	A. Awaad, Moemen 4	Palais Omnisports de Paris-Bercy, Paris; Referees: Lemme, Ulrich (GER)
4 February 2001		Report		Palais Omnisports de Paris-Bercy, Paris; Referees: Lemme, Ulrich (GER)

=== Final ===
4 February 2001
Sweden
25–28 (ET)
France
Palais Omnisports de Paris-Bercy, Paris
Referees: Øie, Hognes (NOR)
Lövgren 8
(10–11)
Fernandez 8
2× (suspension)
Report
3× (suspension)

FT: 22–22 ET: 3–6

== Final standings ==
1. France
2. Sweden
3. Yugoslavia
4. Egypt
5. Spain
6. Russia
7. Ukraine
8. Germany
9. Croatia
10. Tunisia
11. Iceland
12. South Korea
13. Algeria
14. Norway
15. Argentina
16. Portugal
17. Slovenia
18. Czech Republic
19. Brazil
20. Greenland
21. Saudi Arabia
22. Morocco
23. Kuwait
24. United States

== Awards ==
Position	Player
Most valuable player	Stefan Lövgren (SWE)
Goalkeeper	David Barrufet (ESP)
Right wing	Žikica Milosavljević (FRY)
Right back	Yoon Kyung-shin (KOR)
Centre back	Hussein Zaky (EGY)
Left back	Stefan Lövgren (SWE)
Left wing	Eduard Koksharov (RUS)
Pivot	Bertrand Gille (FRA)

== Statistics ==
=== Top goalscorers ===
Rank	Name	Team	Goals
1	Eduard Koksharov	Russia	61
2	Yuriy Kostetskiy	Ukraine	60
3	Yoon Kyung-shin	South Korea	55
5	Stefan Lövgren	Sweden	47
6	Magnus Wislander	Sweden	46
7	Markus Baur	Germany	43
8	Vyacheslav Lochman	Ukraine	42
9	Salim Nedjel	Algeria	41
10	Christian Berge	Norway	40
10	Mohammed Berrajaâ	Morocco	40

=== Top goalkeepers ===
Rank	Name	Team	%
1	Arpad Sterbik	Yugoslavia	45.5
2	Peter Gentzel	Sweden	37.1
3	David Barrufet	Spain	36.1
4	Pavel Sukosyan	Russia	34.4
5	Cristian Canzoniero	Argentina	34.2
6	Yevgeniy Budko	Ukraine	32.5
7	Christian Ramota	Germany	32.1
8	Beno Lapajne	Slovenia	31.6
9	Andrey Lavrov	Russia	31.4
10	Manaf Al-Saeed	Saudi Arabia	30.2

== Medalists ==
Gold	Silver	Bronze
France: Christian Gaudin; Bruno Martini; Thierry Omeyer; Jérôme Fernandez; Didier Dinart; Guillaume Gille; Bertrand Gille; Daniel Narcisse; Grégory Anquetil; Andrej Golic; Olivier Girault; Laurent Puigségur; Jackson Richardson; Joël Abati; Patrick Cazal; Stéphane Plantin Head coach : Mr. Daniel Costantini	Sweden: Tomas Svensson; Peter Gentzel; Martin Boquist; Ola Lindgren; Stefan Lövgren; Magnus Wislander; Thomas Sivertsson; Martin Frändesjö; Mathias Franzen; Johan Petersson; Magnus Andersson; Ljubomir Vranjes; Jonas Ernelind; Christian Ericsson; Mikael Pettersson; Nicklas Johansson Head coach : Mr. Bengt Johansson	Yugoslavia: Arpad Šterbik; Nenad Puljezević; Zoran Đorđić; Vladan Matić; Petar Kapisoda; Nenad Maksić; Žikica Milosavljević; Dragan Škrbić; Ratko Đurković; Ivan Lapčević; Mladen Bojinović; Branko Kokir; Nedeljko Jovanović; Nebojša Golić; Goran Đukanović; Blažo Lisičić Head coach : Mr. Branislav Pokrajac
