= Dunkerque Handball Grand Littoral =

French handball club

US Dunkerque
- Full name: Dunkerque Handball Grand Littoral
- Short name: USDK
- Founded: September 3, 1958; 68 years ago
- Arena: Stade des Flandres
- Capacity: 2,400
- Head coach: Patrick Cazal
- League: LNH Division 1
- 2024–25: LNH Division 1, 11th of 16
- Club colours
Home	Away

Dunkerque Handball Grand Littoral is a handball club from Dunkerque, France. Currently, US Dunkerque HB competes in the French First League of Handball since 1991.

== History ==
The club was founded on 3 September 1958 under the name „Amicale Laïque de l'Esplanade“.

Location of Dunkerque Handball Grand Littoral

== Crest, colours, supporters ==
=== Naming history ===
Name	Period
Union sportive de Dunkerque	1958–2003
Dunkerque Handball Grand Littoral	2003–present

=== Kits ===
HOME
2012-13	2013-14	2014–15	Craft; 2020–21	Craft; 2021–22	2023–24

AWAY
2013-14	2014–15	Craft; 2020–21	Craft; 2021–22	2023–24

== Sports Hall information ==
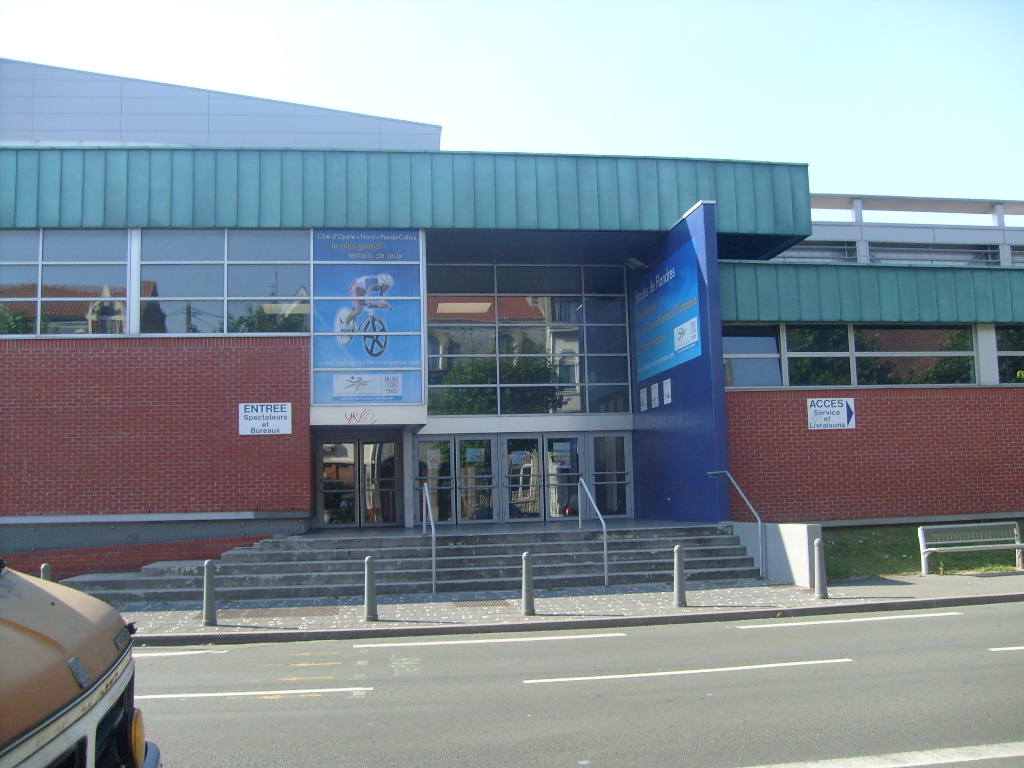
Home hall: Stade des Flandres

- Name: – Stade des Flandres
- City: – Dunkerque
- Capacity: – 2400
- Address: – Av. de Rosendaël Jacques Collache, 59240 Dunkerque, France

== Honors ==
- EHF Cup:

Runner Up : 2012

- EHF Challenge Cup:

Runner Up : 2004

- France Handball League: 1

Champion : 2014.

- Coupe de France: 1

Winner : 2011
Runner Up : 1991, 2000

- Coupe de la Ligue: 1

Winner : 2013
Runner Up : 2002

== Team ==
=== Current squad ===
Squad for the 2024–25 season.

Goalkeepers

- 1 (Cuba) Alejandro Romero
- 16 (Tunisia) (France) Mehdi Harbaoui

Wingers
LW

- 10 (France) Dylan Tossin
- 55 (France) Steve-Marie Joseph

RW

- 5 (France) Florian Billant
- 64 (France) Thibaud Arteaga

Line players

- 3 (France) Benjamin Afgour
- 48 (Hungary) Bence Szűcs

Back players
LB

- 11 (Denmark) Cornelius Kragh
- 14 (France) Quentin Dupuy
- 30 (France) Gautier Crepel

CB

- 8 (France) O'Brian Nyateu
- 28 (France) Jean-Loup Faustin

RB

- 17 (France) Gabin Martinez
- 59 (France) Tom Pelayo

=== Transfers ===
Transfers for the 2026–27 season

Joining

- (Finland) Santeri Vainionpää (LP) from (Finland) Riihimäki Cocks
- (France) Geoffroy Carabasse (LP) from (France) Tremblay Handball
- (France) Léo Villain (GK) from (France) Sélestat Alsace Handball
- (France) Yanis Busselier (RB) from (France) JS Cherbourg

Leaving

- (Hungary) Bence Szűcs (LP) to (Hungary) MOL Tatabánya KC
- (Tunisia) (France) Mehdi Harbaoui (GK) to (France) C' Chartres MHB
- (France) Gabin Martinez (RB) to (France) C' Chartres MHB

=== Transfer History ===
Transfers for the 2025–26 season

Joining

- (Ukraine) Taras Minotskyi (LB) from (Poland) Górnik Zabrze
- (Portugal) Diogo Oliveira (CB) from (Portugal) FC Porto
- (France) Ludwig Appolinaire (CB) from (France) Cesson Rennes MHB
- (France) Matthieu Marmier (RB) from (France) Fenix Toulouse Handball

Leaving

- (Denmark) Cornelius Kragh (LB) to (Denmark) KIF Kolding
- (France) Tom Pelayo (RB) to (Romania) Dinamo București
- (France) Jean-Loup Faustin (CB) to (France) USAM Nîmes Gard

Transfers for the 2024–25 season

Joining

- (Hungary) Bence Szűcs (LP) from (Hungary) Balatonfüredi KSE
- (Tunisia) (France) Mehdi Harbaoui (GK) from (Spain) CD Bidasoa

Leaving

- (Japan) Shuichi Yoshida (LP) to (France) HBC Nantes
- (France) Valentin Kieffer (GK) to (France) Chambéry Savoie Mont-Blanc HB

== Former club members ==
=== Notable former players ===
- (France) Théo Avelange-Demouge (2021–2023)
- (France) Benjamin Afgour (2008–2017, 2020–)
- (France) William Annotel (2011–2018)
- (France) Samir Bellahcene (2018–2023)
- (France) Florian Billant (2014–)
- (France) Sébastien Bosquet (1999–2003, 2005–2013)
- (France) Baptiste Butto (2009–2021)
- (France) Philippe Debureau (1981–1984, 1986–1993)
- (France) Frédéric Dole (1998–1999)
- (France) Vincent Gérard (2010–2015)
- (France) Mickaël Grocaut (2002–2018)
- (France) Guillaume Joli (2012–2014, 2016–2019)
- (France) Valentin Kieffer (2021–2024)
- (France) Bastien Lamon (2001–2017)
- (France) Tom Pelayo (2014–)
- (France) (Cameroon) Erwan Siakam-Kadji (2007–2014)
- (France) Pierre Soudry (2006–2019)
- (France) Arnaud Siffert (2006–2011)
- (France) Yérime Sylla (1994–2001)
- (Algeria) Mohamed Mokrani (2008–2015)
- (Algeria) Abdelkader Rahim (2017–2022)
- (Brazil) Haniel Langaro (2017–2020)
- (Brazil) Alexandro Pozzer (2017–2018)
- (Croatia) Marko Mamić (2015–2017)
- (Hungary) Kornél Nagy (2011–2024)
- (Hungary) Péter Tatai (2008–2010)
- (Iceland) Ragnar Þór Óskarsson (2000–2004, 2008–2011)
- (Montenegro) Žarko Pejović (2014–2017)
- (Norway) Espen Lie Hansen (2012–2014)
- (Poland) Dawid Nilsson (2010–2012)
- (Portugal) Wilson Davyes (2017–2019)
- (Romania) Sorin Toacsen (2004–2006)
- (Russia) Oleg Grams (2017–2021)
- (Slovenia) Jan Jurečič (2019–2021)
- (Spain) Diego Piñeiro (2018–2021)
- (Serbia) Dragan Mladenović (1992–2004)
- (Serbia) Predrag Vejin (2015–2016)
- (Tunisia) Jaleleddine Touati (2006–2015)

=== Former coaches ===
Seasons	Coach	Country
1999–2003	Bernard Pot	(France)
2003–2006	Denis Tristant	(France)
2006–2011	Yérime Sylla	(France)
2011–2022	Patrick Cazal	(France)
2022–	Franck Maurice	(France)
