= Florian Billant =

French handball player (born 1996)

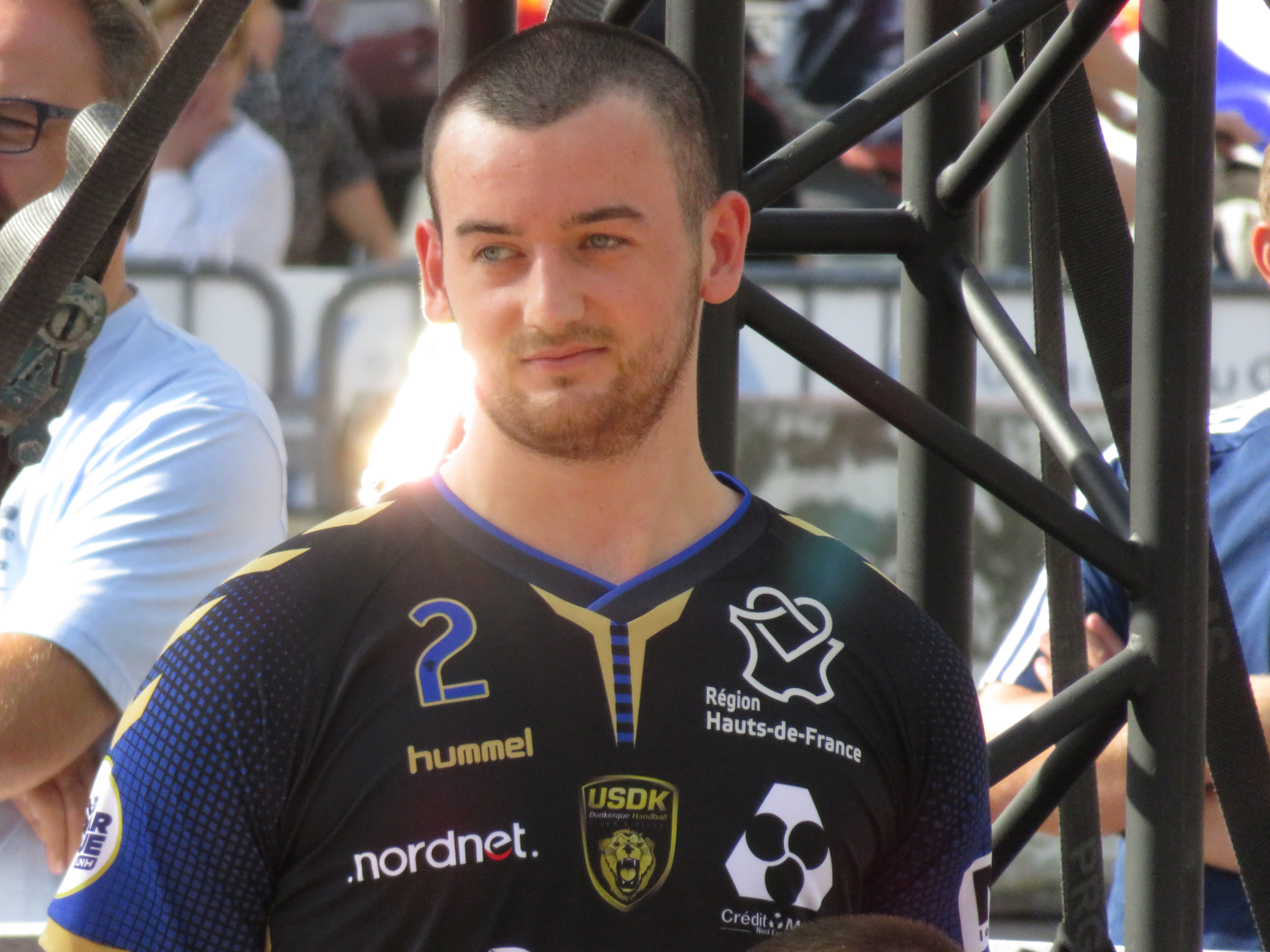

Personal information
- Nationality: French
- Born: 7 July 1996 (age 30) Gravelines, France
- Height: 1.86 m (6 ft 1 in)

Sport
- Sport: Handball
- Position: Right wing
- Current club: Dunkerque HGL
- Number: 5

Youth career
- Years: Team
- –: Dunkerque HGL

Senior clubs
- Years: Team
- 2014-: Dunkerque HGL

Florian Billant (born July 7, 1996, Gravelines) is a French handball player, who has played his entire career for French club HC Dunkerque.

In 2015, in Brazil as part of the national team of France U21 won the world title. In 2016 he participated in the European Championship among youth (U20), where the French team won a bronze medal, played 7 games and scored 21 goal.
