= Vincent Gérard =

French handball player (born 1986)

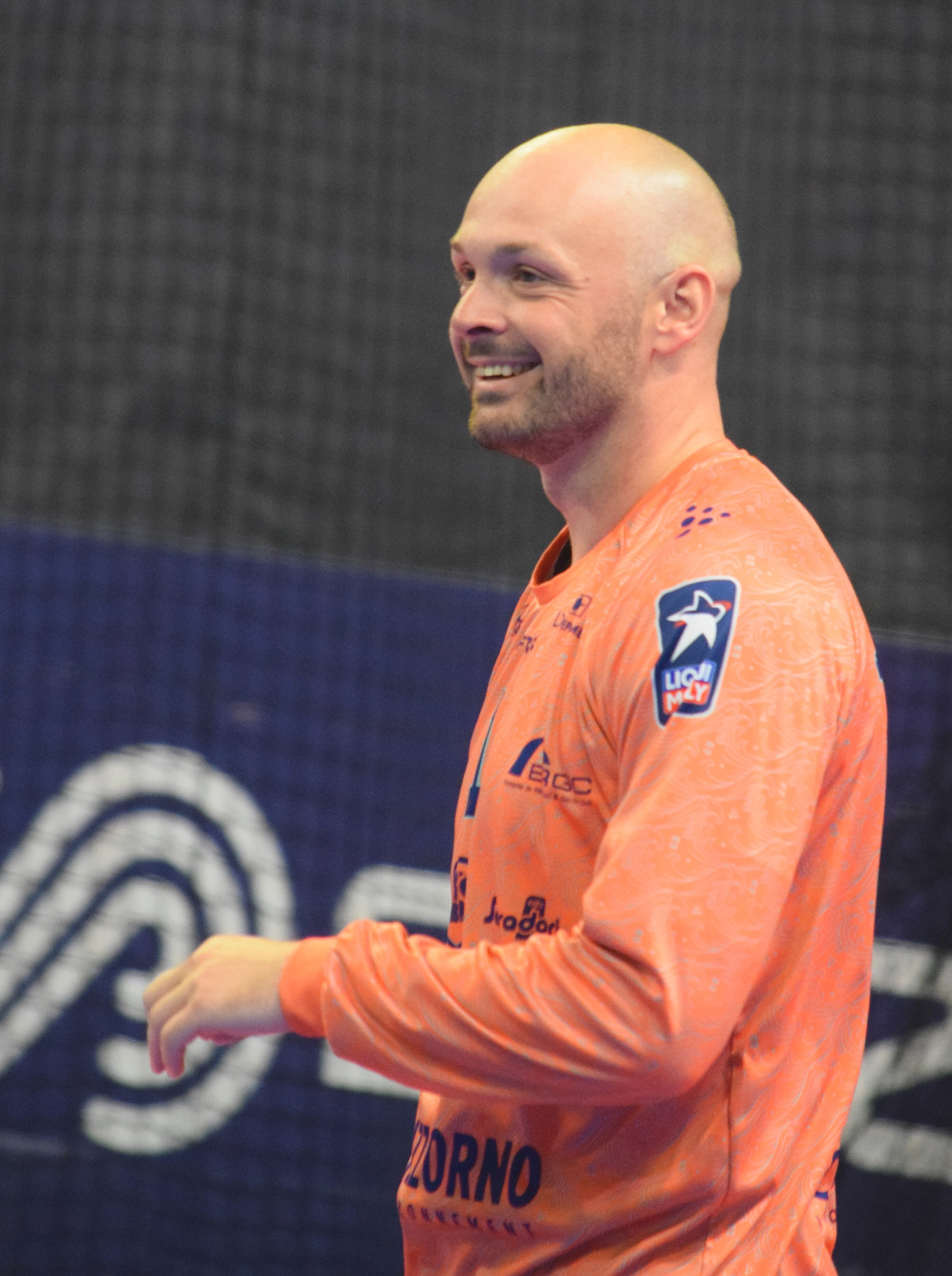
- Gérard in 2023

Personal information
- Nationality: French
- Born: 16 December 1986 (age 39) Woippy, France
- Height: 1.89 m (6 ft 2 in)

Sport
- Sport: Handball
- Position: Goalkeeper

Senior clubs
- Years: Team
- 2003–2006: SMEC Metz
- 2006–2008: Montpellier HB
- 2008–2010: Istres Provence Handball
- 2010–2015: USDK Dunkerque
- 2015–2019: Montpellier HB
- 2019–2022: Paris Saint-Germain
- 2022–2023: Saint-Raphaël Var
- 2023–2024: THW Kiel
- 02–06/2024: Istres Provence Handball
- 04–06/2025: FC Barcelona
National team
Years	Team	Apps	(Gls)
2013–2024	France	160	(18)
Medal record
Olympic Games
Gold medal – first place	2020 Tokyo	Team
Silver medal – second place	2016 Rio de Janeiro	Team
World Championship
Gold medal – first place	2017 France
Silver medal – second place	2023 Poland/Sweden
Bronze medal – third place	2019 Germany/Denmark
European Championship
Gold medal – first place	2014 Denmark
Bronze medal – third place	2018 Croatia
- Updated on 13 August 2024

Vincent Gérard (born 16 December 1986) is a French professional handball player.

With France, he won all the main competitions: 2014 European Championship, 2017 World Championship and 2020 Olympics.

He has been elected best goalkeeper at the 2017 World Championship, at the 2018 European Championship and at the 2020 Olympics.

== Career ==
Gérard began his career at SMEC Metz in the French second division before joining Montpellier HB in 2006, where he served as a backup goalkeeper and was part of the squad that won the LNH Division 1 title in the 2007–08 season.

In 2008 he moved to Istres Provence Handball. There he developed into a first choice goalkeeper and was an important part of the team that won the 2009 Coupe de la Ligue and their only major trophy in history. He was also awarded the most valuable player during the final.

He joined USDK Dunkerque in 2010 and played for them for five seasons. The highpoint came during the 2013-14 season when they won the LNH Division 1 title. This was one of the biggest sensations in the European club handball season according to the EHF. They beat PSG and Montpellier to the crown.

He came back to Montpellier HB in 2015 and played a key role in their run to the EHF Champions League Final of 2017-18 where they beat HBC Nantes 32-27 to win the title in an all-French final in Cologne.

After joining Paris Saint-Germain Handball in 2019, he played there for three seasons before moving to Saint-Raphaël Var Handball in the 2022/23 season. He later moved to THW Kiel in Germany, but suffered an injury in pre-season and did not play in any official games during the 2023/24 season.

After returning back to Istres Provence Handball for the final couple of months of the 2023-24 season, Gérard was included in the French squad for the Paris 2024 Olympics. Having been knocked out in the quarter-finals by France, he has decided to retire from professional handball. However on the 8th April 2025, it was announced that Gérard had signed a contract with FC Barcelona to last until the end of the season after Gonzalo Pérez de Vargas sustained an anterior cruciate ligament tear to his left knee.

== Titles ==
=== With clubs ===
- EHF Champions League: (2)
  - Champions: 2017–18
- EHF Cup: (2)
  - Runners up: 2011–12
- LNH Division 1: (5)
  - Champions: 2007–08 (Montpellier), 2013–14 (Dunkerque), 2019–20, 2020–21, 2021–22 (PSG)
- Coupe de France: (5)
  - Winner: 2008 (Montpellier), 2011 (Dunkerque), 2016 (Montpellier), 2021 et 2022 (PSG)
- Coupe de la Ligue: (5)
  - Winner: 2007, 2008 (Montpellier), 2009 (Istres), 2013 (Dunkerque) et 2016 (Montpellier).
- Trophée des Champions: (3)
  - Winner: 2012 (Dunkerque), 2018 (Montpellier) et 2019 (PSG)
- Liga ASOBAL: (1)
  - Champions: 2024–25 (Barcelona)

=== Individual awards ===
- French Championship Best Goalkeeper: 2011, 2013, 2014, 2017, 2018
- Best goalkeeper at the 2017 World Championship
- Best goalkeeper at the 2018 European Championship
- Best goalkeeper at the 2020 Olympics.
