= Mohamed Mokrani =

Algerian handball player (born 1981)

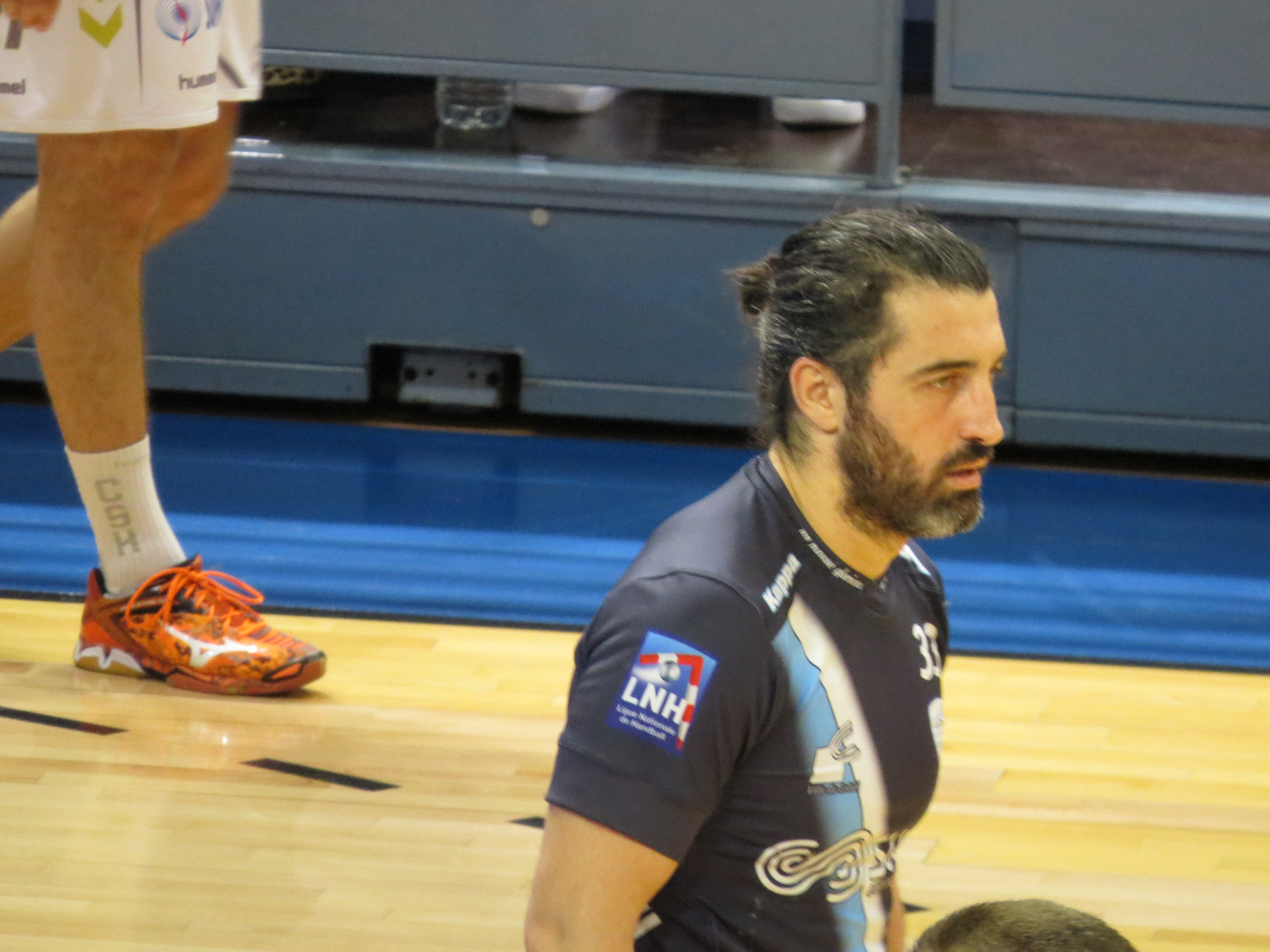

Personal information
- Nationality: Algerian
- Born: 31 January 1981 (age 45) Ivry-sur-Seine, France
- Height: 1.92 m (6 ft 4 in)

Sport
- Sport: Handball
- Position: Pivot
- Current club: Dunkerque
- Number: 46
National team
Years	Team	Apps	(Gls)
2008	France	2	(6)
2010-2016	Algeria	33	(40)

Mohamed Mokrani (born 31 January 1981) is an Algerian-French handball player, who plays for the Algerian national team and Dunkerque. He has previously played for the French national team.

He competed for the Algerian national team at the 2015 World Men's Handball Championship in Qatar.

He also participated at the 2011 and 2013 World Championships.

He is born in France to Algerian parents and possesses both French and Algerian citizenship.
