= Galaxie Amnéville =

Indoor arena in Amnéville, France

Coordinates: 49.2457°N 6.1286°E

- Interactive map of Galaxie Amnéville
- Former names: Salle Thermal (planning/construction)
- Address: Centre Thermal & Touristique – B.P.20069; 57362 Amnéville; France
- Location: Parc de Clouange
- Owner: Ministère de la Culture et de la Communication
- Capacity: 12,000 - 13,000

Construction
- Built: 9 March 1990
- Opened: 14 December 1990; Inaugurated 4 January 1991
- Cost: Fr 590,000

Website
- Venue Website

The Galaxie d'Amnéville (also known as Galaxie Mega Hall, Galaxie de Metz or simply Le Galaxie) is an arena located in Amnéville, France, about 20 kilometers from Metz. The arena is primarily used for concerts and other music-related events but also occasionally hosts handball tournaments. The Galaxie has a maximum capacity of approximately 12,000 to 13,000.

== Background ==
In 1987, Jean Kiffer, deputy mayor of Amnéville proposed a new entertainment centre for Lorraine to host musical and sporting events. Originally, the Ministère de la Culture et de la Communication to construct a Zénith in Amnéville. However, these plans were abandoned with the organization later opening Zénith de Nancy in Maxéville, 1993. Known as Salle Thermal, the original plans were to construct a casino to include an open-air amphitheater seating 5,400. In 1989, plans were changed to now construct an indoor arena, seating at least 8,000. The arena was designed in the same vein as the Zénith de Paris however large enough to compete with the Palais Omnisports de Paris-Bercy. Designed by Jean-Luc Chancerel, construction began in March 1990 and was completed in nine months (six months ahead of schedule). Capacity was expanded from 8,000 to 13,000. The arena opened to the public in December 1990, with its first event held 4 January 1991; a concert by Patricia Kaas.

== Performers ==
Entertainers who have performed at Galaxie include:

- Tokio Hotel
- Céline Dion
- Joe Cocker
- Muse
- Iron Maiden
- Toto
- Scorpions
- Genesis
- Chris Rea
- Deep Purple
- Linkin Park
- Snoop Dogg and P. Diddy
- Placebo
- Rammstein
- INXS
- Sting
- Julio Iglesias
- Depeche Mode
- AC/DC
- Arturo Brachetti
- André Rieu
- Simply Red
- Texas
- David Bowie
- Whitney Houston
- Elton John
- Phil Collins
- Simple Minds
- Peter Gabriel
- Joe Satriani
- George Michael
- Status Quo
- The Fugees
- Lenny Kravitz
- Moby
- The Cranberries
- Guns N' Roses
- Alicia Keys
- Shakira
- James Blunt
- Barclay James Harvest
- Kylie Minogue
- 50 Cent
- Laura Pausini
- Beyoncé
- Britney Spears
- The Offspring
- Thirty Seconds to Mars
- LMFAO
- Jennifer Lopez
- One Direction
- Lana Del Rey
- 5 Seconds Of Summer
- Queen + Adam Lambert
