= Jaleleddine Touati =

Tunisian handball player

Personal information
- Nationality: Tunisian
- Born: 12 July 1982 (age 44) Tunis, Tunisia
- Height: 1.79 m (5 ft 10 in)

Sport
- Sport: Handball
- Position: Right wing
- Current club: Dunkerque
- Number: 7
National team
Years	Team	Apps	(Gls)
–	Tunisia	194	(397)
Medal record
Mediterranean Games
Bronze medal – third place	2009 Pescara	Team

Jaleleddine Touati (born 12 July 1982) is a Tunisian handball player, playing for Dunkerque. He competed for the Tunisian national team at the 2012 Summer Olympics in London, where the Tunisian team reached the quarterfinals.
