= Patrick Cazal =

French handball player (born 1971)

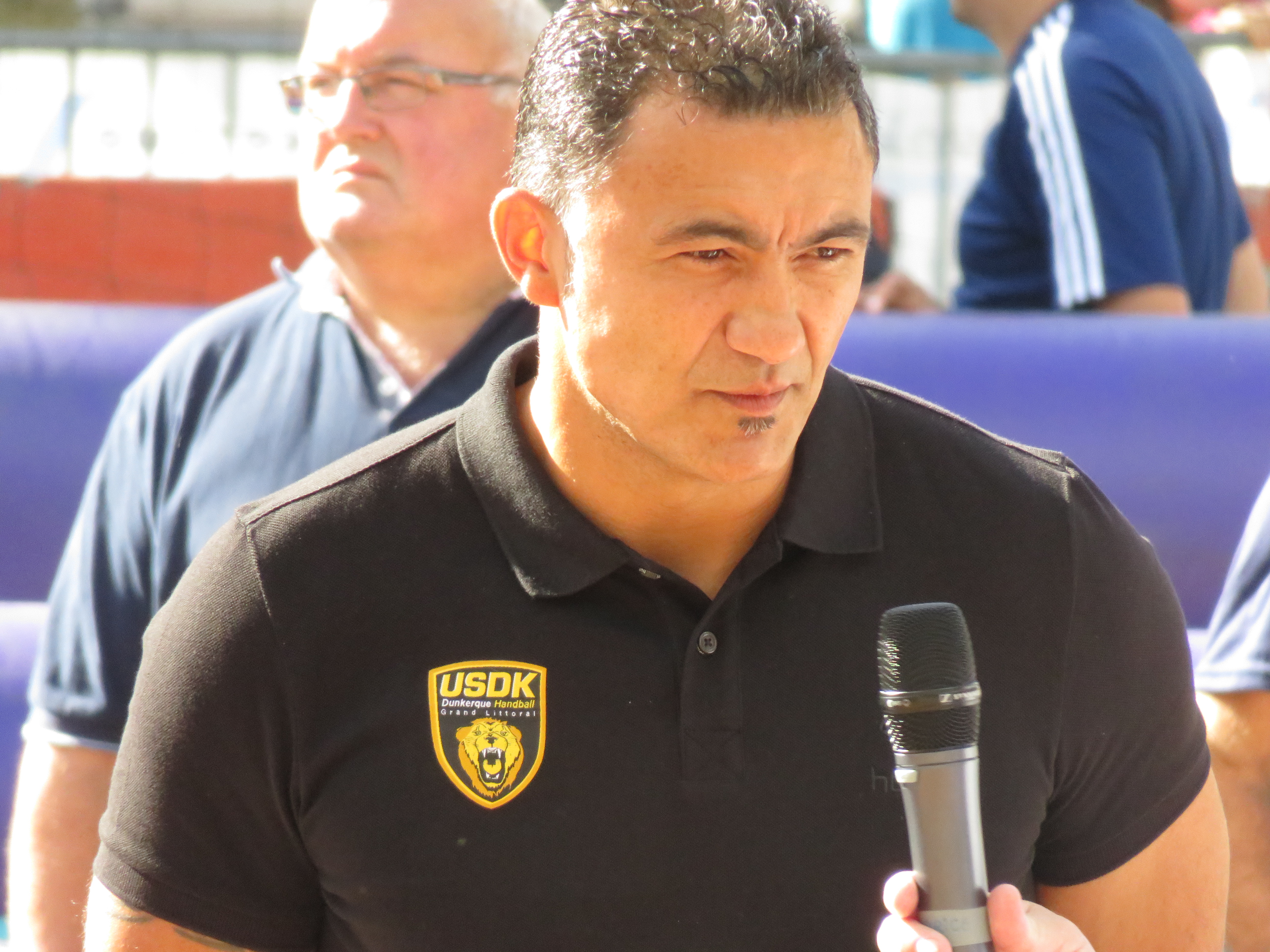

Personal information
- Nationality: French
- Born: 6 April 1971 (age 55) Saint-Joseph, Réunion, France
- Height: 185 cm (73 in)

Sport
- Sport: Handball
- Position: Right back

Youth career
- Years: Team
- –: Château-Morange
- 1989-1990: Paris-Asnières

Senior clubs
- Years: Team
- 1990-1994: Paris-Asnières
- 1994-1999: Montpellier Handball
- 1999-2002: Bidasoa Irún
- 2002-2005: TUSEM Essen
- 2005-2008: Dunkerque HGL
National team
Years	Team	Apps	(Gls)
1994–2004	France	171	(482)

Teams managed
- 2011–2022: Dunkerque HGL
- 2022–2024: Tunisia
Medal record
Representing France
World Championships
Gold medal – first place	1995 Iceland	Team
Gold medal – first place	2001 France	Team
Bronze medal – third place	1997 Japan	Team
Bronze medal – third place	2003 Portugal	Team

Patrick Cazal (born 1971) is a French team handball coach and former player. As a player he was part of the French team, that won the 1995 World Championship; the first time ever France won a major international tournament. He also competed at the 2000 Summer Olympics, where the French team placed 6th. Since retiring from competitions in 2008 he worked as a handball coach, with Dunkerque Handball Grand Littoral (2011–2022).

== Career ==
Cazal started playing handball at Château-Morange on Réunion, before joining Paris-Asnières in 1989. He broke through on the first team in 1990. He later joined Montpellier Handball where he won the 1995, 1998 and 1999 French Championship and the 1999 French Cup.

He debuted for the French national team on November 2nd, 1994 against Switzerland.

In 1999 he joined Spanish Bidasoa Irún in the top league, Liga ASOBAL. In 2002 he joined German Bundesliga team TUSEM Essen. Here he won the 2005 EHF Cup. In 2005 he returned to France and joined Dunkerque HGL. He retired in 2008, and became the assistant coach at Dunkerque.

== Coaching career ==
After three years as the assistant, in 2011 he overtook the head coach position at the club. He coached the club for 11 years until 2022.

Between September 2022 and April 2024 he was the head coach of the Tunisia men's national team.

== Titles ==
=== Club ===
- French Championship
  - Winner: 1995, 1998, 1999
- French Cup
  - Winner: 1999
  - Finalist: 1998
- EHF Cup
  - Winner: 2005

== Individual awards ==
- French Championship Best Coach: 2013, 2014
