= Benjamin Afgour =

French handball player (born 1991)

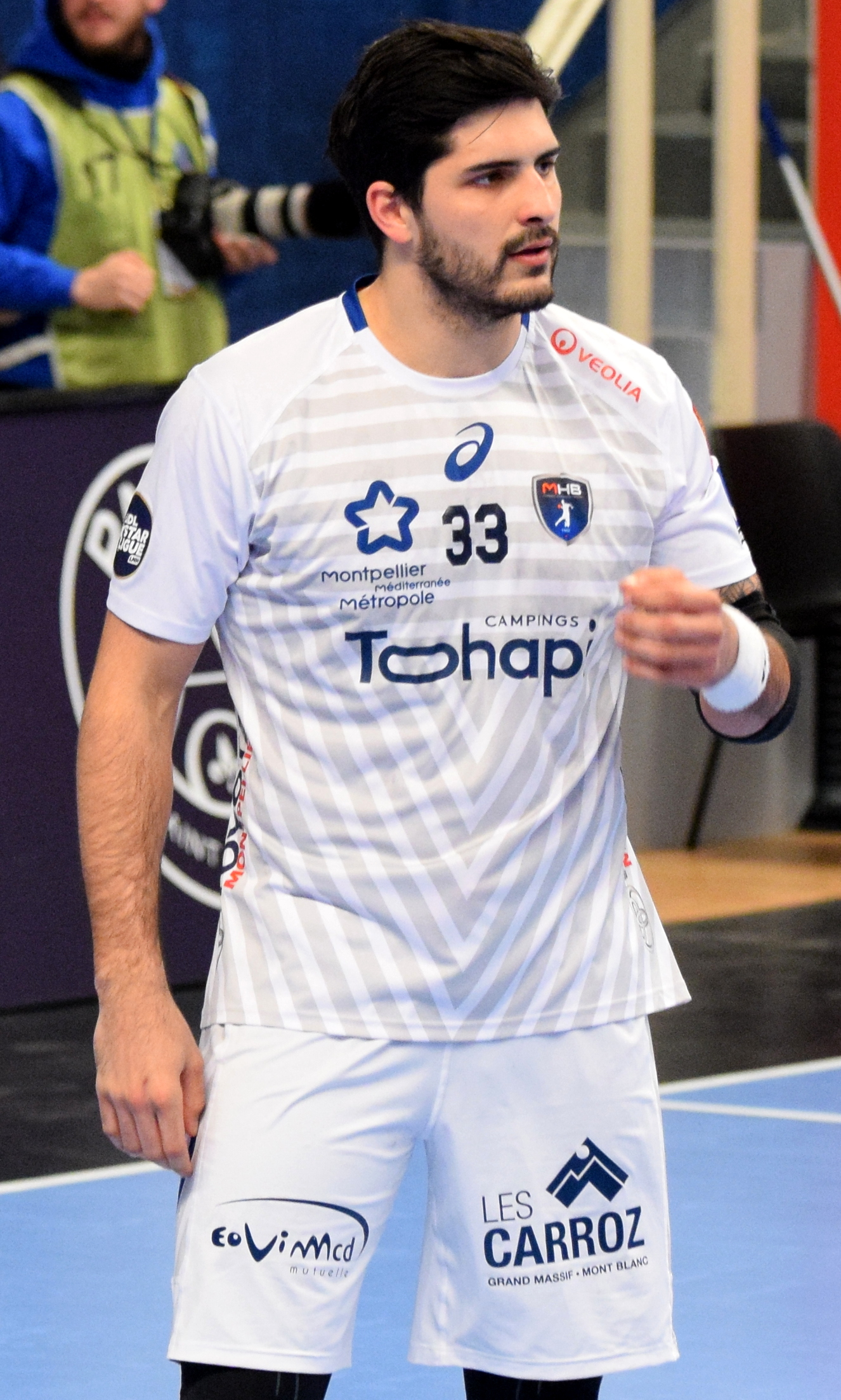
- Afgour in 2018

Personal information
- Nationality: French
- Born: 1 April 1991 (age 35) Rethel, France
- Height: 1.95 m (6 ft 5 in)

Sport
- Sport: Handball
- Position: Pivot
- Current club: Dunkerque Handball Grand Littoral
- Number: 23

Youth career
- Years: Team
- 2008-2009: Dunkerque Handball Grand Littoral

Senior clubs
- Years: Team
- 2009-2017: Dunkerque Handball Grand Littoral
- 2017-2020: Montpellier Handball
- 2020-: Dunkerque Handball Grand Littoral
National team
Years	Team	Apps	(Gls)
2024-	France	12	(17)
Medal record
European Championship
Bronze medal – third place	2018 Croatia
- Updated on 21 August 2022

Benjamin Afgour (born 1 April 1991) is a French handball player for Dunkerque Handball Grand Littoral and the French national team. He has played almost his entire career for Dunkerque, except for three years between 2017 and 2020 for Montpellier Handball

With Dunkerue he won he won the French Cup twice in 2011 and 2013, and in 2014 he won the French Championship. With Montpellier he won the EHF Champions League in 2018.

He debuted for the French national team on January 4th 2014 in a 29:23 win against Qatar. He was part of the French team that won bronze medals at the 2018 European Men's Handball Championship.
