= Palais des Sports (Besançon) =

Sport hall in Besançon

Coordinates: 47°14′43″N 6°00′00″E

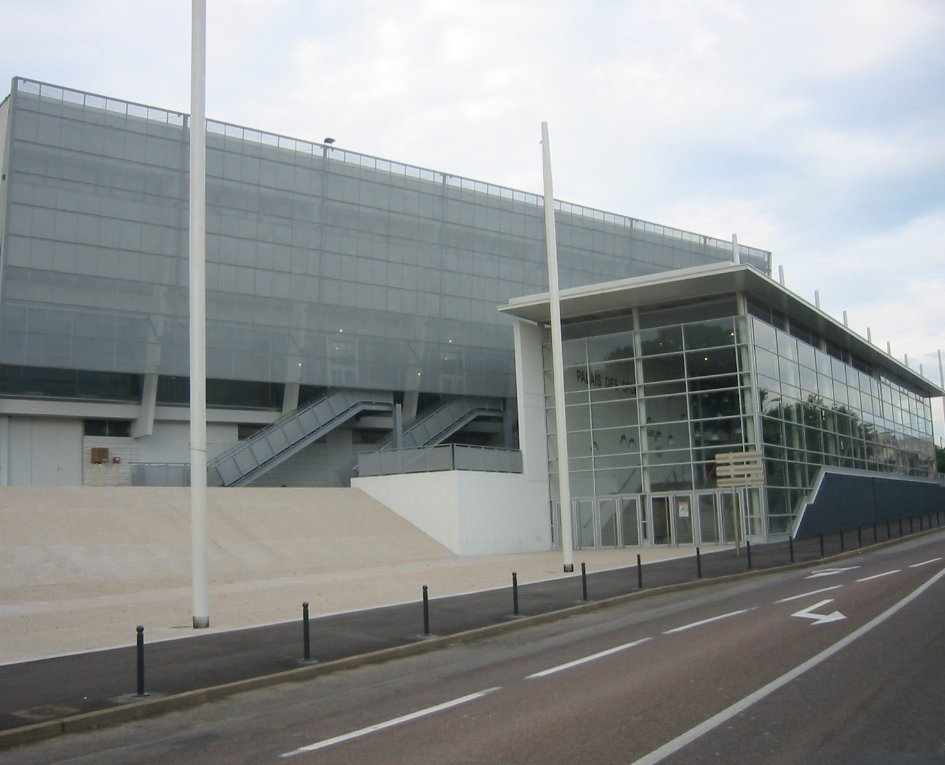
Palais des Sports (Besançon)

The Palais des Sports (Besançon), also known as Palais des sports Ghani-Yalouz, is an indoor sports arena, located in Besançon, France. The capacity of the arena is 4,000 people. The stadium is named after Ghani Yalouz, a French former Olympic wrestler.

== History ==
Construction work on Besançon's Palais des Sports began on February 19, 1965, and it was inaugurated on February 10, 1967. At the beginning of the 21st century, a major extension and transformation was carried out, and the new Palais des Sports was inaugurated on October 25, 2005. On February 12, 2017, it was renamed the "Palais des sports Ghani-Yalouz".

== Tenants ==
It is currently home to handball clubs ESBF Besançon (competing in the premier women's handball league) and Grand Besançon Doubs Handball (second level of the men's handball).

It used to be home to the Besançon Basket Comté Doubs basketball team until the team got liquidated and ceased to exist.

== Capacity ==
The capacity of the arena is adjustable:

- Handball configuration: 3 380 seats
- Basketball configuration: 4 200 seats
