= Stade des Flandres =

Indoor sporting arena in Dunkerque, France

Coordinates: 51°2′8″N 2°23′30″E

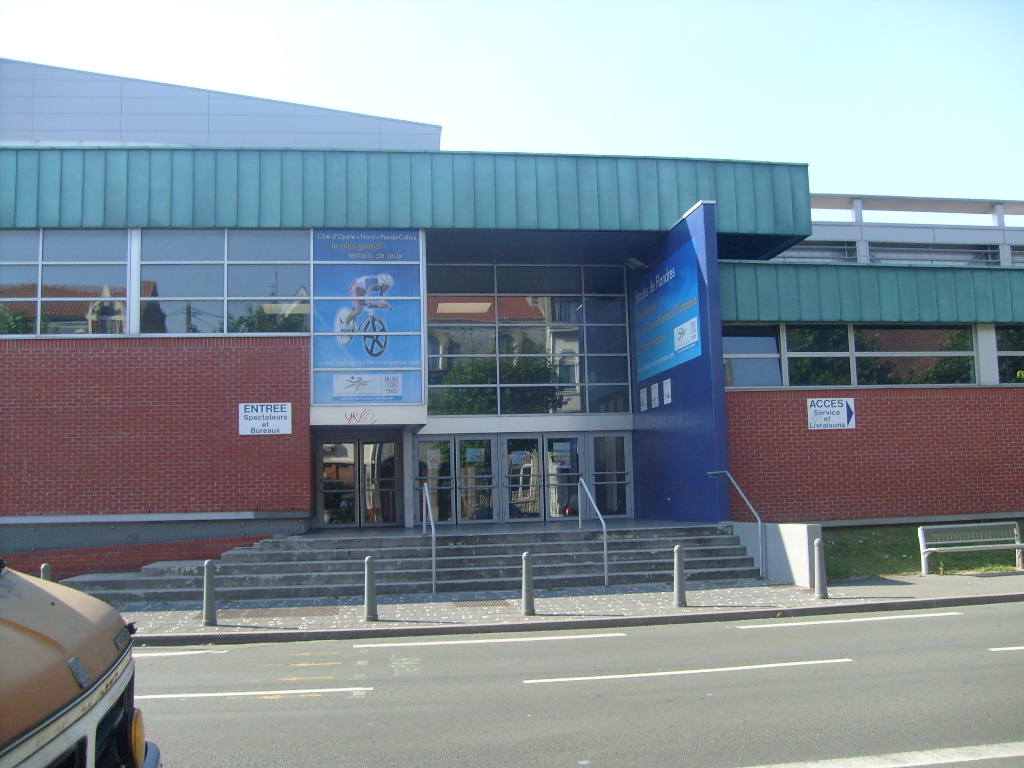
Arena entry

Stade des Flandres (lit. ‘Stadium of Flanders’) is an indoor sporting arena located in Dunkerque, France. The capacity of the arena is 2,500 people. It is currently home to the Dunkerque Handball Grand Littoral team, as well as the temporary home of the BCM Gravelines-Dunkerque basketball team after their stadium Sportica burned down in 2023.

Salle Louis Dewerdt (or salle Dewerdt for short) was its original name. Louis Dewerdt was a local city councillor of the centre-right Union for French Democracy. Salle means "hall", i.e., a sports hall, or indoor arena.
