= Maud-Éva Copy =

French handball player (born 1992)

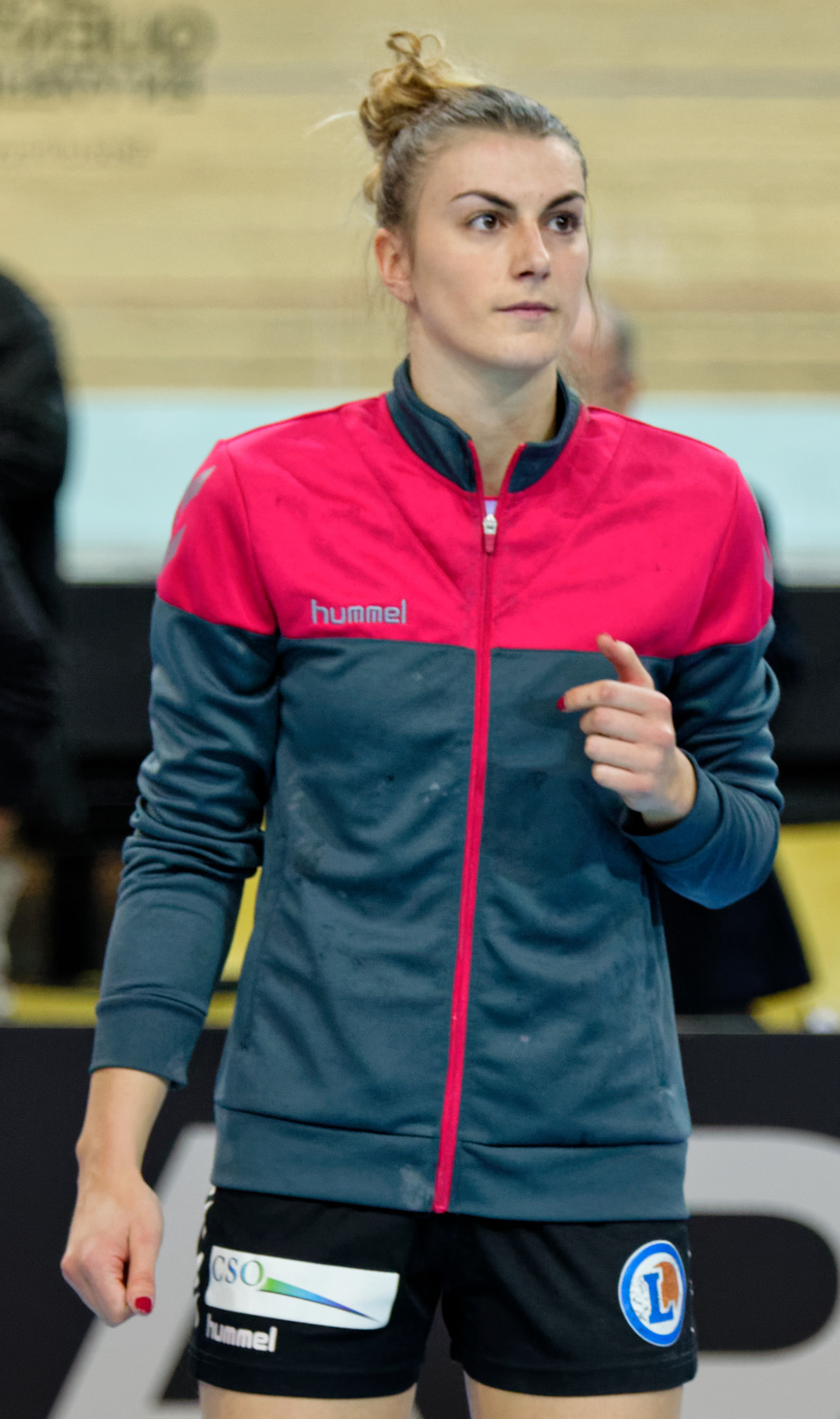
- Maud-Eva Copy in 2017

Personal information
- Nationality: French
- Born: 6 November 1992 (age 33) Brest, France
- Height: 1.74 m (5 ft 9 in)

Sport
- Sport: Handball
- Position: Left wing
- Current club: Metz Handball
- Number: 8

Youth career
- Years: Team
- –: Locmaria Handball

Senior clubs
- Years: Team
- 2012-2019: Brest Bretagne Handball
- 2019-2020: Bourg-de-Péage Drôme Handball
- 2020-: Metz Handball

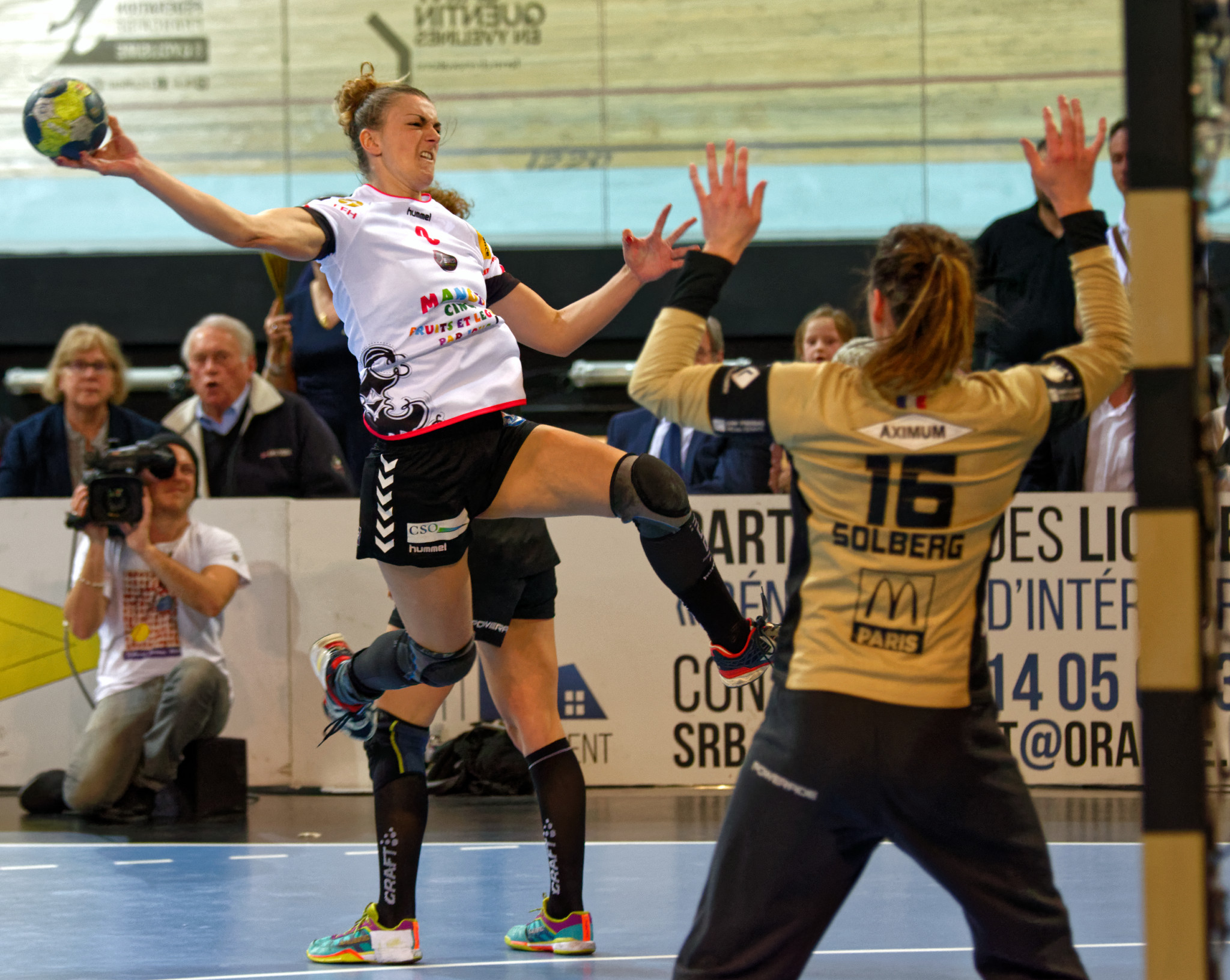
Mar.25, 2017

Maud-Éva Copy (born 6 November 1992) is a French handball player. In 2020 it was announced that she would play for Metz Handball.

As a child she played handball at Locmaria Handball together with Pauline Coatanea.

== Achievements ==
- Championnat de France
  - Silver Medalist: 2017
- Coupe de France:
  - Winner: 2016
