= 2024 European Women's Handball Championship squads =

The following is a list of squads for each nation competing at the 2024 European Women's Handball Championship.

Each squad consisted of up to 20 players, and 16 players were selected on each matchday. In addition, there was a maximum of six players who can be replaced during the tournament, from the long list, consisting of 35 players.

Age, caps and goals correct as of 28 November 2024.

== Group A ==
=== Hungary ===
A 18-player squad was announced on 28 November 2024.

Head coach: Vladimir Golovin

No.	Pos.	Name	Date of birth (age)	Height	App.	Goals	Club
4	P	Petra Füzi-Tóvizi	15 March 1999 (aged 25)	1.78 m	84	102	(Hungary) Debreceni VSC
5	LB	Luca Csíkos	25 February 2005 (aged 19)	1.80 m	0	0	(Hungary) Váci NKSE
6	LW	Nadine Szöllősi-Schatzl	19 November 1993 (aged 31)	1.74 m	124	305	(Hungary) Moyra-Budaörs Handball
16	GK	Blanka Böde-Bíró	22 September 1994 (aged 30)	1.87 m	125	3	(Hungary) Ferencvárosi TC
19	LW	Gréta Márton	3 October 1999 (aged 25)	1.72 m	89	202	(Hungary) Ferencvárosi TC
28	RB	Nikoletta Papp	23 July 1996 (aged 28)	1.80 m	56	70	(Romania) SCM Gloria Buzău
31	GK	Zsófi Szemerey	2 June 1994 (aged 30)	1.83 m	28	0	(France) Metz Handball
32	P	Noémi Pásztor	2 April 1999 (aged 25)	1.80 m	43	39	(Romania) CSM București
33	CB	Nikolett Tóth	13 July 2001 (aged 23)	1.75 m	0	0	(Hungary) Debreceni VSC
38	CB	Petra Vámos	14 September 2000 (aged 24)	1.75 m	78	205	(France) Metz Handball
42	RB	Katrin Klujber	21 April 1999 (aged 25)	1.70 m	85	450	(Hungary) Ferencvárosi TC
44	LB	Gréta Kácsor	24 April 2000 (aged 24)	1.73 m	45	67	(Romania) CS Gloria Bistrița-Năsăud
48	RW	Dorottya Faluvégi	31 March 1998 (aged 26)	1.69 m	41	65	(Germany) HB Ludwigsburg
52	LB	Gréta Juhász	16 March 2002 (aged 22)	1.79 m	17	24	(Hungary) Váci NKSE
58	P	Réka Bordás	26 August 1997 (aged 27)	1.84 m	62	54	(Hungary) Ferencvárosi TC
59	LB	Csenge Kuczora	26 January 2000 (aged 24)	1.76 m	47	159	(Germany) Thüringer HC
61	GK	Kinga Janurik	6 November 1991 (aged 33)	1.76 m	71	1	(Hungary) Ferencvárosi TC
66	RW	Viktória Győri-Lukács	31 October 1995 (aged 29)	1.68 m	127	378	(Hungary) Győri ETO KC
71	LW	Mirtill Petrus	14 November 2001 (aged 23)	1.69 m	0	0	(Hungary) Debreceni VSC
77	CB	Petra Simon	12 November 2004 (aged 20)	1.68 m	28	74	(Hungary) Ferencvárosi TC

=== North Macedonia ===
Head coach: Kristijan Grchevski

No.	Pos.	Name	Date of birth (age)	Height	App.	Goals	Club
1	GK	Matea Churlinovska	6 December 2005 (aged 18)	1.74 m	1	0	(North Macedonia) WHC Despina
9	CB	Nena Nestoroska	18 May 2005 (aged 19)	1.74 m	0	0	(North Macedonia) ŽRK Kumanovo
10	LB	Ana Marija Kolarovska	18 August 2002 (aged 22)	1.73 m	3	8	(North Macedonia) WHC Gjorche Petrov
12	GK	Dragana Petkovska	12 June 1996 (aged 28)	1.75 m	7	0	(Italy) PDO Handball Team Salerno
13	P	Ivana Djatevska	13 April 2003 (aged 21)	1.78 m	23	10	(Hungary) Kisvárdai KC
15	LB	Marija Jankulovska	2 November 2005 (aged 19)	1.75 m	5	2	(North Macedonia) ŽRK Metalurg
17	RW	Teodora Dukoska	10 June 2004 (aged 20)	1.70 m	5	0	(North Macedonia) WHC CHAIR
18	LB	Elena Gjeorgjievska	27 March 1990 (aged 34)	1.80 m	53	188	(Poland) MKS Kalisz
19	RB	Iva Mladenovska	14 January 2007 (aged 17)	1.80 m	9	12	(France) Brest Bretagne Handball
22	LW	Bojana Dinevska	7 October 2000 (aged 24)	1.63 m	2	2	(North Macedonia) WHC CHAIR
26	GK	Jovana Micevska	26 July 2000 (aged 24)	1.76 m	21	1	(Romania) CSM Slatina
30	RB	Jovana Kiprijanovska	30 December 2001 (aged 22)	1.84 m	20	17	(France) Sambre Avesnois Handball
31	LB	Andrea Sedloska	6 March 2003 (aged 21)	1.83 m	14	22	(Croatia) RK Lokomotiva Zagreb
32	CB	Ivana Arsenievska	8 December 2003 (aged 20)	1.75 m	12	5	(Romania) AHCM Slobozia
33	RW	Sara Ristovska	9 September 1996 (aged 28)	1.69 m	56	272	(Romania) CS Rapid Bucuresti
41	LB	Sara Stefanoska	11 January 2005 (aged 19)	1.78 m	1	1	(Serbia) ŽORK Jagodina
58	LB	Simona Madjovska	2 November 1993 (aged 31)	1.81 m	37	68	(Germany) BSV Sachsen Zwickau
71	LW	Jovana Sazdovska	27 June 1993 (aged 31)	1.77 m	45	124	(Romania) CSM Slatina
93	P	Katerina Damjanoska	19 May 2003 (aged 21)	1.73 m	4	3	(North Macedonia) WHC Gjorche Petrov

=== Sweden ===
The squad was announced on 31 October 2024. On 25 November, the squad was reduced to 17 players as Daniela de Jong had to withdraw due to an injury.

Head coach: Tomas Axnér

No.	Pos.	Name	Date of birth (age)	Height	App.	Goals	Club
1	GK	Johanna Bundsen	3 June 1991 (aged 33)	1.85 m	157	6	(Germany) HB Ludwigsburg
2	LW	Clara Lerby	8 May 1999 (aged 25)	1.72 m	12	35	(Denmark) EH Aalborg
6	CB	Carin Strömberg	10 July 1993 (aged 31)	1.84 m	159	229	(Norway) Vipers Kristiansand
7	P	Linn Blohm	20 May 1992 (aged 32)	1.80 m	179	527	(Hungary) Győri ETO KC
8	LB	Jamina Roberts (c)	28 May 1990 (aged 34)	1.76 m	246	645	(Norway) Vipers Kristiansand
11	LB	Tyra Axnér	18 March 2002 (aged 22)	1.78 m	47	84	(France) Metz Handball
16	GK	Jessica Ryde	18 May 1994 (aged 30)	1.85 m	61	0	(Hungary) Debreceni VSC
17	RB	Nina Dano	12 June 2000 (aged 24)	1.72 m	59	105	(Sweden) IK Sävehof
21	GK	Evelina Eriksson	20 August 1996 (aged 28)	1.84 m	45	1	(Romania) CSM București
23	RB	Emma Lindqvist	17 September 1997 (aged 27)	1.77 m	101	212	(Denmark) Ikast Håndbold
24	RW	Nathalie Hagman	19 July 1991 (aged 33)	1.67 m	234	882	(Romania) SCM Râmnicu Vâlcea
29	LB	Kristin Thorleifsdóttir	13 January 1998 (aged 26)	1.82 m	73	106	(Hungary) Debreceni VSC
35	P	Sofia Hvenfelt	23 April 1996 (aged 28)	1.80 m	34	37	(Germany) HB Ludwigsburg
38	LW	Elin Hansson	7 August 1996 (aged 28)	1.73 m	87	221	(Denmark) Team Esbjerg
42	CB	Jenny Carlson	17 April 1995 (aged 29)	1.72 m	73	205	(Germany) HB Ludwigsburg
49	P	Olivia Löfqvist	13 July 1998 (aged 26)	1.77 m	21	22	(Norway) Storhamar HE
55	RW	Clara Petersson Bergsten	28 May 2002 (aged 22)	1.62 m	8	14	(Sweden) Skuru IK

=== Turkey ===
Heah coach: (Romania) Costică Buceschi

No.	Pos.	Name	Date of birth (age)	Height	App.	Goals	Club
2	RB	Beyza Gedik	15 December 2000 (aged 23)	1.76 m	31	78	(Turkey) Yalıkavak SK
2	LW	Beyzanur Türkyılmaz	29 August 2001 (aged 23)	1.65 m	0	0	(Turkey) Adasokağı SK
9	LB	Aslı İskit	7 December 1993 (aged 30)	1.78 m	72	242	(Romania) SCM Craiova
10	LW	Elif Sıla Aydın	11 April 1996 (aged 28)	1.68 m	30	72	(Poland) AZS Koszalin
11	RB	Döne Gül Bozdoğan	3 February 1999 (aged 25)	1.72 m	30	43	(Romania) CSM Slatina
13	RW	Bilgenur Öztürk	16 June 1999 (aged 25)	1.71 m	13	36	(Turkey) Yalıkavak SK
14	P	Nurceren Akgün Göktepe	20 June 1992 (aged 32)	1.81 m	72	127	(Turkey) Yalıkavak SK
16	LB	Buğu Sönmez	1 January 2006 (aged 18)	1.82 m	0	0	(Turkey) Anadolu University
17	LW	Beyza İrem Türkoğlu	14 February 1997 (aged 27)	1.76 m	27	103	(Romania) SCM Gloria Buzău
18	GK	Yağmur Bembeyaz	25 June 1999 (aged 25)	1.83 m	3	0	(Turkey) Üsküdar Belediyespor
20	CB	Gülcan Tügel	10 July 2000 (aged 24)	1.73 m	18	43	(Turkey) Adasokağı SK
21	LB	Betül Yılmaz (c)	31 October 1988 (aged 36)	1.78 m	85	182	(Turkey) Bursa BBSK
22	RW	Emine Gökdemir	1 February 2003 (aged 21)	1.63 m	18	27	(Turkey) Bursa BBSK
23	CB	Yasemin Şahin	25 June 1988 (aged 36)	1.68 m	96	341	(Turkey) Üsküdar Belediyespor
26	LB	Diğdem Hoşgör	2 October 1991 (aged 33)	1.80 m	29	34	(Poland) MKS Kalisz
47	P	Büşra Işıkhan	1 January 1999 (aged 25)	1.76 m	0	0	(France) Achenheim Truchtersheim Handball
58	GK	Merve Erbektaş	15 April 1996 (aged 28)	1.82 m	36	7	(Romania) CSM Slatina
61	RB	Edanur Çetin	3 May 2000 (aged 24)	1.71 m	6	10	(Turkey) Bursa BBSK
99	P	Ceren Demirçelen	23 February 1992 (aged 32)	1.71 m	36	82	(Turkey) Bursa BBSK

== Group B ==
=== Czech Republic ===
Head coach: (Norway) Bent Dahl

No.	Pos.	Name	Date of birth (age)	Height	App.	Goals	Club
4	LW	Kristýna Königová	24 September 2003 (aged 21)	1.68 m	10	17	(Czech Republic) Házená Kynžvart
8	LB	Simona Schreibmeierová	10 March 2005 (aged 19)	1.84 m	0	0	(Czech Republic) DHC Slavia Prague
20	LB	Veronika Andrýsková	24 May 1997 (aged 27)	1.92 m	36	32	(Germany) Neckarsulmer SU
22	RB	Markéta Šustáčková	9 April 1997 (aged 27)	1.75 m	65	108	(Norway) Molde Elite
24	LB	Eliška Desortová	19 April 2000 (aged 24)	1.75 m	27	16	(Slovakia) HC DAC Dunajská Streda
27	GK	Patricie Wizurová	1 June 2005 (aged 19)	1.85 m	5	0	(Czech Republic) DHC Sokol Poruba
31	P	Alena Stellnerová	22 August 1989 (aged 35)	1.70 m	89	83	(Czech Republic) Sokol Písek
33	GK	Petra Kudláčková	17 October 1994 (aged 30)	1.73 m	93	2	(Czech Republic) HC Zlín
34	CB	Julie Franková	4 October 2000 (aged 24)	1.79 m	44	32	(Czech Republic) DHC Slavia Prague
35	RB	Valerie Smetková	10 January 2001 (aged 23)	1.72 m	8	13	(Czech Republic) DHK Baník Most
38	RW	Anna Franková	2 October 1996 (aged 28)	1.70 m	40	53	(Germany) TuS Metzingen
42	P	Katka Dresslerová	21 May 1998 (aged 26)	1.70 m	18	4	(Czech Republic) Házená Kynžvart
51	LB	Markéta Jeřábková	8 February 1996 (aged 28)	1.74 m	112	571	(Denmark) Ikast Håndbold
67	LW	Veronika Malá	6 May 1994 (aged 30)	1.69 m	113	371	(Germany) HB Ludwigsburg
79	GK	Sabrina Novotná	2 July 2000 (aged 24)	1.83 m	35	1	(Czech Republic) Házená Kynžvart
96	LB	Charlotte Cholevová	29 July 2002 (aged 22)	1.73 m	47	196	(Romania) SCM Râmnicu Vâlcea

=== Montenegro ===
Head coach: Suzana Lazović

No.	Pos.	Name	Date of birth (age)	Height	App.	Goals	Club
1	GK	Marina Rajčić	24 August 1993 (aged 31)	1.78 m	177	5	(Romania) CS Măgura Cisnădie
9	LB	Đurđina Jauković	24 February 1997 (aged 27)	1.85 m	102	251	(Romania) CSM București
10	CB	Matea Pletikosić	24 April 1998 (aged 26)	1.69 m	60	80	(Croatia) RK Podravka Koprivnica
11	P	Ivana Godeč	11 May 2001 (aged 23)	1.77 m	25	10	(Montenegro) ŽRK Budućnost
12	GK	Armelle Attingré	15 January 1989 (aged 35)	1.79 m	10	1	(Montenegro) ŽRK Budućnost
13	LW	Dijana Mugoša	22 October 1995 (aged 29)	1.69 m	54	120	(Romania) SCM Craiova
15	RB	Jelena Vukčević	11 December 2004 (aged 19)	1.78 m	10	8	(Montenegro) ŽRK Budućnost
24	RB	Tanja Ivanović	5 November 1996 (aged 28)	1.82 m	36	20	(Montenegro) ŽRK Budućnost
25	RB	Đurđina Malović	5 May 1996 (aged 28)	1.82 m	59	75	(Hungary) Szombathelyi KKA
34	P	Tatjana Brnović	9 November 1998 (aged 26)	1.84 m	80	140	(Slovenia) RK Krim
37	RW	Nina Bulatović	9 December 1996 (aged 27)	1.72 m	44	60	(Montenegro) ŽRK Budućnost
43	GK	Marta Batinović	20 April 1990 (aged 34)	1.85 m	30	2	(Romania) CS Măgura Cisnădie
44	RB	Katarina Džaferović	14 July 2002 (aged 22)	1.82 m	15	5	(Romania) SCM Craiova
55	P	Andrijana Tatar	10 December 1995 (aged 28)	1.79 m	0	0	(Romania) CS Minaur Baia Mare
90	CB	Milena Raičević	12 March 1990 (aged 34)	1.78 m	168	492	Not attached
91	LW	Ivona Pavićević	21 April 1996 (aged 28)	1.78 m	96	135	(Montenegro) ŽRK Budućnost
96	CB	Itana Grbić	1 September 1996 (aged 28)	1.71 m	108	236	(Slovenia) RK Krim
97	P	Nikolina Vukčević	28 July 2000 (aged 24)	1.80 m	18	6	(Romania) CS Gloria Bistrița-Năsăud

=== Romania ===
Head coach: Florentin Pera

No.	Pos.	Name	Date of birth (age)	Height	App.	Goals	Club
1	GK	Bianca Curmenț	12 June 1997 (aged 27)	1.82 m	5	0	(Romania) CSM Corona Brașov
10	LB	Ștefania Stoica	24 August 2003 (aged 21)	1.86 m	6	14	(Romania) Rapid București
11	P	Mirabela Coteț	22 February 2001 (aged 23)	1.77 m	0	0	(Romania) HC Dunărea Brăila
14	LB	Bianca Bazaliu	30 July 1997 (aged 27)	1.82 m	37	53	(Romania) Gloria Bistrița
15	P	Ștefania Jipa	1 March 2000 (aged 24)	1.77 m	0	0	(Romania) SCM Gloria Buzău
16	GK	Raluca Kelemen	24 June 1998 (aged 26)	1.80 m	0	0	(Romania) SCM Râmnicu Vâlcea
17	CB	Rebeca Necula	17 May 2003 (aged 21)	1.68 m	4	2	(Romania) SCM Râmnicu Vâlcea
18	RB	Daria Bucur	11 July 1999 (aged 25)	1.80 m	24	19	(Romania) SCM Gloria Buzău
21	LW	Alexandra Dindiligan	16 February 1997 (aged 27)	1.74 m	21	35	(Romania) CSM București
24	CB	Alisia Boicuic	20 July 2005 (aged 19)	1.77 m	3	4	(Romania) CSM Corona Brașov
27	P	Lorena Ostase	25 July 1997 (aged 27)	1.79 m	45	89	(Romania) Rapid București
30	RW	Sonia Seraficeanu	25 July 1997 (aged 27)	1.76 m	49	95	(Romania) Gloria Bistrița
55	RB	Oana Borș	27 November 2003 (aged 21)	1.79 m	4	7	(Romania) HC Dunărea Brăila
70	CB	Andreea Popa	3 June 2000 (aged 24)	1.77 m	19	37	(Romania) HC Dunărea Brăila
71	RB	Alicia Gogîrlă	17 January 2003 (aged 21)	1.83 m	9	11	(Romania) SCM Râmnicu Vâlcea
89	LW	Corina Lupei	12 July 2002 (aged 22)	1.75 m	6	9	(Romania) HC Dunărea Brăila
98	GK	Daciana Hosu	16 January 1998 (aged 26)	1.82 m	35	0	(Romania) CSM București
99	LB	Sorina Grozav	27 May 1999 (aged 25)	1.75 m	11	27	(Romania) Rapid București

=== Serbia ===
Head coach: (Slovenia) Uroš Bregar

No.	Pos.	Name	Date of birth (age)	Height	App.	Goals	Club
1	GK	Marija Simić	21 February 2000 (aged 24)	1.75 m	13	0	(Serbia) ŽORK Jagodina
2	LW	Sanja Radosavljević	15 January 1994 (aged 30)	1.71 m	103	286	(Romania) CS Măgura Cisnădie
3	LB	Teodora Veličković	28 April 2001 (aged 23)	1.76 m	17	20	(Serbia) RK Crvena zvezda
5	CB	Emilija Lazić	4 August 2000 (aged 24)	1.78 m	15	43	(Romania) HC Zalău
6	CB	Una Obrenović	27 December 2003 (aged 20)	1.72 m	10	9	(Serbia) ŽRK Zelezničar
10	RW	Nikolina Vidić	19 December 2005 (aged 18)	1.73 m	2	1	(Serbia) RK Crvena zvezda
13	LW	Tamara Kocić	17 July 2003 (aged 21)	1.79 m	10	8	(Serbia) ŽRK Zelezničar
15	RB	Anđela Janjušević	18 June 1995 (aged 29)	1.81 m	74	195	(Romania) CS Rapid Bucuresti
16	GK	Jovana Risović	7 October 1993 (aged 31)	1.71 m	86	5	(Romania) SCM Craiova
19	LB	Jelena Knežević	25 January 1998 (aged 26)	1.84 m	6	7	(Slovakia) IUVENTA Michalovce
22	LB	Jovana Jovović	4 December 2001 (aged 22)	1.81 m	30	65	(Hungary) Debreceni VSC
29	RW	Nataša Lovrić	2 October 2000 (aged 24)	1.73 m	17	27	(Romania) CS Măgura Cisnădie
31	P	Katarina Bojičić	13 March 1998 (aged 26)	1.79 m	27	43	(Romania) SCM Craiova
34	RW	Dunja Radević	25 November 2005 (aged 19)	1.69 m	21	39	(Montenegro) RK Buducnost Podgorica
36	CB	Jovana Ristić	16 January 2000 (aged 24)	1.74 m	4	2	(Serbia) Radnički 1949
44	RB	Milica Ignjatović	17 September 2005 (aged 19)	1.83 m	4	4	(Slovenia) RK Krim
72	P	Jelena Agbaba	20 June 1997 (aged 27)	1.82 m	34	43	(Serbia) RK Crvena zvezda
83	P	Marija Petrović	18 March 1994 (aged 30)	1.87 m	34	43	(Romania) SCM Gloria Buzău
91	GK	Tatjana Činku	10 February 2006 (aged 18)	1.78 m	4	0	(Serbia) ŽRK Zelezničar

== Group C ==
=== France ===
A 21-player squad was announced on 5 November 2024. It was reduced to 19 players on 20 November 2024.

Head coach: Sébastien Gardillou

No.	Pos.	Name	Date of birth (age)	Height	App.	Goals	Club
1	GK	Laura Glauser	20 August 1993 (aged 31)	1.78 m	135	2	(Hungary) Ferencvárosi TC
3	RW	Alicia Toublanc	3 May 1996 (aged 28)	1.69 m	61	170	(Romania) SCM Râmnicu Vâlcea
4	RW	Pauline Coatanea	6 July 1993 (age 33)	1.65 m	74	129	(France) Brest Bretagne Handball
5	LB	Clarisse Mairot	27 January 2001 (aged 23)	1.70 m	4	3	(France) Brest Bretagne Handball
6	LW	Chloé Valentini	19 April 1995 (aged 29)	1.65 m	100	293	(France) Metz Handball
8	LW	Coralie Lassource	1 September 1992 (aged 32)	1.70 m	104	174	(France) Brest Bretagne Handball
10	CB	Grâce Zaadi	7 July 1993 (aged 31)	1.71 m	193	375	(Romania) CSM București
12	GK	Floriane André	30 May 2000 (aged 24)	1.85 m	16	2	(France) Brest Bretagne Handball
20	RB	Laura Flippes	13 December 1994 (aged 29)	1.71 m	143	283	(France) Metz Handball
21	LB	Orlane Kanor	16 June 1997 (aged 27)	1.78 m	102	228	(Hungary) Ferencvárosi TC
22	CB	Tamara Horacek	5 November 1995 (aged 29)	1.78 m	97	193	(Slovenia) RK Krim
23	RB	Déborah Lassource	29 September 1999 (aged 25)	1.72 m	38	33	(Germany) Borussia Dortmund Handball
26	P	Pauletta Foppa	22 December 2000 (aged 23)	1.77 m	98	252	(France) Brest Bretagne Handball
27	LB	Estelle Nze Minko (c)	11 August 1991 (aged 33)	1.71 m	200	491	(Hungary) Győri ETO KC
29	P	Oriane Ondono	14 April 1996 (aged 28)	1.80 m	36	33	(France) Brest Bretagne Handball
31	RW	Lucie Granier	11 May 1999 (aged 25)	1.67 m	56	109	(France) Metz Handball
32	P	Sarah Bouktit	27 August 2002 (aged 22)	1.82 m	34	56	(France) Metz Handball
34	CB	Léna Grandveau	21 January 2003 (aged 21)	1.71 m	36	51	(France) Metz Handball
99	GK	Hatadou Sako	21 October 1995 (aged 29)	1.73 m	30	0	(Hungary) Győri ETO KC

=== Poland ===
The squad was announced on 7 November.

Head coach: (Norway) Arne Senstad

No.	Pos.	Name	Date of birth (age)	Height	App.	Goals	Club
4	P	Aleksandra Olek	31 October 2000 (aged 24)	1.78 m	18	33	(Poland) MKS Lublin
8	RB	Monika Kobylińska	9 April 1995 (aged 29)	1.77 m	114	403	(Romania) CSM București
13	P	Sylwia Matuszczyk	11 June 1992 (aged 32)	1.72 m	60	102	(Poland) MKS Lublin
16	GK	Adrianna Płaczek	10 December 1993 (aged 30)	1.74 m	102	1	(France) Paris 92
17	RW	Adrianna Górna	22 March 1996 (aged 28)	1.71 m	65	68	(Poland) MKS Zagłębie Lubin
18	CB	Aleksandra Tomczyk	19 October 1994 (aged 30)	1.73 m	26	27	(Poland) MKS Lublin
21	GK	Barbara Zima	14 January 2000 (aged 24)	1.89 m	45	9	(Poland) MKS Zagłębie Lubin
22	LB	Aleksandra Rosiak	7 July 1997 (aged 27)	1.82 m	70	156	(Poland) MKS Lublin
26	GK	Paulina Wdowiak	12 January 2000 (aged 24)	1.75 m	8	0	(Poland) MKS Lublin
27	CB	Magdalena Drażyk	23 February 1997 (aged 27)	1.69 m	4	9	(Poland) KPR Kobierzyce
31	RW	Magda Balsam	20 September 1996 (aged 28)	1.72 m	52	167	(Poland) MKS Lublin
34	P	Marlena Urbańska	11 January 1998 (aged 26)	1.86 m	22	19	(Norway) Molde Elite
39	RB	Natalia Nosek	20 April 1998 (aged 26)	1.80 m	52	84	(Romania) CS Gloria Bistrița-Năsăud
40	LW	Daria Michalak	12 December 1995 (aged 28)	1.71 m	56	88	(Poland) MKS Zagłębie Lubin
49	CB	Karolina Kochaniak	5 July 1995 (aged 29)	1.75 m	43	95	(Poland) MKS Zagłębie Lubin
78	LB	Paulina Uścinowicz	16 October 1999 (aged 25)	1.83 m	22	26	(Germany) Frisch Auf Göppingen
88	RB	Aleksandra Zych	28 July 1993 (aged 31)	1.82 m	84	108	(Poland) Start Elbląg
96	LW	Dagmara Nocuń	2 January 1996 (aged 28)	1.66 m	60	102	(Romania) CS Gloria Bistrița-Năsăud

=== Portugal ===
The squad was announced on 12 November.

Head coach: José António Silva

No.	Pos.	Name	Date of birth (age)	Height	App.	Goals	Club
1	GK	Isabel Góis	10 October 1995 (aged 29)	1.82 m	89	0	(Portugal) Madeira Andebol SAD
2	LB	Mariana Lopes	4 December 1994 (aged 29)	1.73 m	70	242	(Hungary) Békéscsabai Előre NKSE
6	LW	Carolina Monteiro Nunes	8 October 1998 (aged 26)	1.69 m	36	59	(Portugal) ADA de Sao Pedro do Sul
7	P	Bebiana Rodrigues Sabino	15 November 1986 (aged 38)	1.74 m	145	241	(Portugal) Colégio de Gaia
8	CB	Constança Sequeira	17 February 2004 (aged 20)	1.72 m	10	15	(Portugal) S.L. Benfica
9	LB	Ana Carolina Policarpo Silva	19 September 1997 (aged 27)	1.75 m	33	10	(Spain) Motive.co Gijon
16	GK	Jéssica Ferreira	11 October 1996 (aged 28)	1.80 m	63	2	(Hungary) Békéscsabai Előre NKSE
18	GK	Matilde Costa Rosa	8 July 2005 (aged 19)	1.74 m	12	0	(Portugal) S.L. Benfica
19	CB	Patrícia da Silva Lima	3 March 1995 (aged 29)	1.78 m	55	90	(Spain) CBF Málaga Costa del Sol
22	P	Nádia Rodrigues	28 March 2001 (aged 23)	1.73 m	15	22	(Portugal) S.L. Benfica
23	RW	Patrícia Rodrigues	7 November 1996 (aged 28)	1.87 m	56	203	(Portugal) S.L. Benfica
25	RB	Luciana Rebelo	25 July 2005 (aged 19)	1.70 m	17	26	(Denmark) Team Esbjerg
27	RB	Beatriz Sousa	27 September 2001 (aged 23)	1.76 m	33	103	(France) Toulon Métropole Var Handball
36	LW	Marianna Ferraz Costa	29 August 2003 (aged 21)	1.76 m	9	18	(Portugal) S.L. Benfica
73	LB	Joana Resende	23 March 2001 (aged 23)	1.60 m	28	67	(Spain) CBF Málaga Costa del Sol
88	RW	Neide Duarte	16 February 2000 (aged 24)	1.77 m	20	27	(Portugal) Madeira Andebol SAD
99	LB	Maria João Gomes Unjanque	11 February 2003 (aged 21)	1.74 m	17	51	(Portugal) S.L. Benfica

=== Spain ===
An 18-player squad was announced on 24 November.

Head coach: Ambros Martín

No.	Pos.	Name	Date of birth (age)	Height	App.	Goals	Club
1	GK	Nicole Wiggins	9 August 2000 (aged 24)	1.78 m	34	1	(France) OGC Nice Côte d'Azur Handball
6	LB	Carmen Campos	10 July 1995 (aged 29)	1.71 m	79	176	(Germany) Borussia Dortmund
10	P	Elisabet Cesáreo	25 September 1999 (aged 25)	1.76 m	70	73	(Spain) CBF Málaga Costa del Sol
14	LW	Ona Vegué	9 July 1998 (aged 26)	1.69 m	17	40	(Germany) HSG Blomberg-Lippe
17	LW	Jennifer Gutiérrez Bermejo	20 May 1995 (aged 29)	1.69 m	112	289	(Slovenia) RK Krim
19	LB	Ester Somaza	3 June 2004 (aged 20)	1.77 m	13	21	(Spain) KH-7 BM Granollers
23	CB	Paula Arcos	21 December 2001 (aged 22)	1.66 m	66	155	(Norway) Vipers Kristiansand
27	LB	Danila So Delgado	19 September 2001 (aged 23)	1.75 m	24	57	(Romania) CS Gloria Bistrița-Năsăud
33	P	Kaba Gassama	16 August 1997 (aged 27)	1.80 m	76	116	(Germany) HB Ludwigsburg
37	CB	Paola Bernabé	11 August 2003 (aged 21)	1.73 m	3	3	(Spain) CB Elche
52	RW	Paulina Pérez	25 January 1997 (aged 27)	1.67 m	22	61	(Spain) BM Porriño
58	RB	María Prieto O'Mullony	3 October 1997 (aged 27)	1.72 m	37	74	(Spain) BM Aula Cultural
65	RW	Anne Erauskin	7 November 1998 (aged 26)	1.69 m	4	5	(Spain) BM Bera Bera
67	CB	Elba Álvarez	26 May 2001 (aged 23)	1.70 m	9	17	(Spain) BM Bera Bera
68	P	Lyndie Tchaptchet	13 January 2005 (aged 19)	1.85 m	3	14	(Spain) BM Bera Bera
70	CB	Carmen Arroyo	3 March 2004 (aged 20)	1.80 m	4	8	(Spain) BM Bera Bera
75	RW	Paula Agulló	10 June 2005 (aged 19)	1.65 m	4	3	(Spain) CB Elche
93	GK	Nicole Morales	5 August 1998 (aged 26)	1.73 m	8	1	(Spain) CB Elche

== Group D ==
=== Croatia ===
The squad was announced on 26 November 2024.

Head coach: Ivica Obrvan

No.	Pos.	Name	Date of birth (age)	Height	App.	Goals	Club
1	GK	Lucija Bešen	29 March 1998 (aged 26)	1.82 m	51	1	(Croatia) RK Podravka Koprivnica
2	RW	Nikolina Kragulj	2 September 1997 (aged 27)	1.67 m	37	64	(Croatia) RK Podravka Koprivnica
3	LW	Paula Posavec	26 August 1996 (aged 28)	1.70 m	87	121	(Croatia) ŽRK Zrinski Čakovec
4	LB	Tina Barišić	30 October 2000 (aged 24)	1.85 m	20	46	(Croatia) RK Podravka Koprivnica
5	CB	Iva Zrilić	13 October 2004 (aged 20)	1.66 m	2	0	(Croatia) RK Lokomotiva Zagreb
6	P	Sara Šenvald	14 March 1996 (aged 28)	1.85 m	32	27	(Croatia) RK Podravka Koprivnica
8	CB	Stela Posavec	26 August 1996 (aged 28)	1.65 m	75	130	(Poland) MKS Lublin
10	CB	Dejana Milosavljević	23 November 1994 (aged 30)	1.73 m	42	105	(Romania) HC Dunărea Brăila
12	GK	Ivana Kapitanović	17 September 1994 (aged 30)	1.84 m	61	6	(Romania) Gloria Bistrița-Năsăud
17	P	Katarina Ježić	19 December 1992 (aged 31)	1.73 m	115	246	(Romania) HC Dunărea Brăila
23	RB	Katarina Pavlović	30 January 1995 (aged 29)	1.80 m	27	89	(Romania) CS Minaur Baia Mare
26	P	Mia Brkić	11 May 2003 (aged 21)	1.80 m	16	16	(Croatia) RK Podravka Koprivnica
35	LW	Josipa Mamić	7 January 1996 (aged 28)	1.65 m	26	43	(Croatia) RK Podravka Koprivnica
38	LW	Katja Vuković	13 September 2006 (aged 18)	1.71 m	2	3	(Croatia) RK Podravka Koprivnica
40	LB	Tena Petika	16 June 2000 (aged 24)	1.90 m	21	32	(France) OGC Nice
43	RB	Klara Birtić	28 March 2002 (aged 22)	1.81 m	13	25	(Croatia) RK Podravka Koprivnica
45	CB	Iva Bule	14 November 2004 (aged 20)	1.74 m	2	2	(Croatia) RK Dalmatinka Ploče
88	LB	Kristina Prkačin	21 October 1997 (aged 27)	1.83 m	46	43	(Croatia) RK Podravka Koprivnica

=== Denmark ===
The squad was announced on 5 November 2024. On 24 November, Elma Halilcevic was added to the squad. On 6 December, Mette Tranborg wad added to the squad. On 9 December, Sandra Toft replaced Althea Reinhardt due to a head injury.

Head coach: Jesper Jensen

No.	Pos.	Name	Date of birth (age)	Height	App.	Goals	Club
1	GK	Sandra Toft	18 October 1989 (aged 35)	1.76 m	191	2	(Hungary) Győri ETO KC
3	P	Kaja Kamp	29 April 1994 (aged 30)	1.72 m	11	12	(Denmark) Team Esbjerg
4	RB	Helene Kindberg	13 January 1998 (aged 26)	1.79 m	7	19	(Denmark) København Håndbold
5	P	Sarah Iversen	10 April 1990 (aged 34)	1.77 m	104	172	(Denmark) Ikast Håndbold
6	CB	Helena Elver	1 March 1998 (aged 26)	1.75 m	36	60	(Denmark) Odense Håndbold
8	LB	Anne Mette Hansen	25 August 1994 (aged 30)	1.82 m	177	515	(France) Metz Handball
11	LB	Line Haugsted	11 November 1994 (age 31)	1.80 m	111	142	(Denmark) Team Esbjerg
12	GK	Anna Kristensen	25 October 2000 (aged 24)	1.83 m	34	0	(Denmark) Team Esbjerg
16	GK	Althea Reinhardt	1 September 1996 (aged 28)	1.80 m	126	0	(Denmark) Odense Håndbold
18	RB	Mette Tranborg	1 January 1996 (aged 28)	1.92 m	118	266	(Denmark) Team Esbjerg
21	RW	Andrea Aagot	22 May 2000 (aged 24)	1.77 m	45	72	(Denmark) Odense Håndbold
23	CB	Kristina Jørgensen	17 January 1998 (aged 26)	1.87 m	123	374	(Hungary) Győri ETO KC
25	RW	Trine Østergaard (c)	17 October 1991 (aged 33)	1.66 m	196	393	(Romania) CSM București
26	LB	Stine Eiberg	25 November 1998 (aged 26)	1.81 m	6	3	(Denmark) Nykøbing Falster Håndboldklub
32	LB	Mie Højlund	24 October 1997 (aged 27)	1.80 m	114	233	(Denmark) Odense Håndbold
33	LW	Emma Friis	31 October 1999 (aged 25)	1.62 m	71	213	(Romania) CSM București
34	P	Rikke Iversen	18 May 1993 (aged 31)	1.78 m	90	140	(Denmark) Team Esbjerg
41	LW	Elma Halilcevic	18 June 2000 (aged 24)	1.68 m	35	72	(Denmark) Odense Håndbold
42	CB	Michala Møller	16 February 2000 (aged 24)	1.78 m	34	52	(Denmark) Team Esbjerg

=== Faroe Islands ===
An 18-player squad was announced on 5 November.

Head coach: (Denmark) Claus Mogensen

No.	Pos.	Name	Date of birth (age)	Height	App.	Goals	Club
1	GK	Annika Fríðheim Petersen	1 June 1999 (aged 25)	1.79 m	30	0	(Denmark) EH Aalborg
2	LB	Elsa Egholm	21 June 2003 (aged 21)	1.73 m	19	21	(Faroe Islands) H71
4	RW	Brynhild Pálsdóttir	5 March 2003 (aged 21)	1.73 m	9	10	(Faroe Islands) H71
6	CB	Marita Mortensen	24 March 1998 (aged 26)	1.77 m	16	17	(Denmark) HØJ Elite
7	P	Bjarta Osberg Johansen	28 April 1993 (aged 31)	1.69 m	39	38	(Faroe Islands) Kyndil
8	LW	Rannvá Olsen	22 January 2003 (aged 21)	1.67 m	16	26	(Faroe Islands) VÍF
10	RB	Súna Krossteig Hansen	29 March 2000 (aged 24)	1.67 m	33	78	(Denmark) Skanderborg Håndbold
11	RW	Lukka Arge	28 June 2004 (aged 20)	1.79 m	5	12	(Faroe Islands) H71
13	P	Brynja Høj	26 February 1996 (aged 28)	1.71 m	25	11	(Faroe Islands) Neistin
17	P	Lív Bentsdóttir Zachariasen	11 April 2002 (aged 22)	1.77 m	12	7	(Faroe Islands) H71
18	P	Pernille Brandenborg	29 June 1997 (aged 27)	1.85 m	43	65	(Denmark) København Håndbold
21	LB	Maria Pálsdóttir Nólsoy	19 August 2004 (aged 20)	1.76 m	15	43	(Denmark) HH Elite
22	RB	Bjørk Franksdóttir Joensen	11 February 2004 (aged 20)	1.69 m	10	9	(Denmark) Randers HK
23	LW	Lív Sveinbjørnsdóttir Poulsen	27 December 2001 (aged 22)	1.73 m	28	54	(Denmark) EH Aalborg
33	LW	Turid Arge Samuelsen	27 December 1994 (aged 29)	1.63 m	40	123	(Faroe Islands) Kyndil
44	LW	Anna Elisabeth Halsdóttir Weyhe	30 August 2005 (aged 19)	1.66 m	8	23	(Faroe Islands) H71
77	CB	Jana Mittún	24 November 2003 (aged 21)	1.72 m	22	95	(Denmark) Viborg HK
88	GK	Rakul Wardum	12 June 2002 (aged 22)	1.76 m	22	1	(Denmark) Ringkøbing Håndbold

=== Switzerland ===
The squad was announced on 11 November.

Head coach: (Norway) Knut Ove Joa

No.	Pos.	Name	Date of birth (age)	Height	App.	Goals	Club
1	GK	Lea Schüpbach	10 September 1997 (aged 27)	1.78 m	50	0	(Germany) TuS Metzingen
2	P	Chantal Wick	24 February 1994 (aged 30)	1.74 m	57	41	(Switzerland) GC Amicitia Zürich
3	CB	Kerstin Kündig	2 July 1993 (aged 31)	1.74 m	93	250	(Germany) Thüringer HC
4	CB	Laurentia Wolff	19 August 2003 (aged 21)	1.73 m	17	2	(Switzerland) LC Brühl Handball
5	P	Lisa Frey	16 February 1995 (aged 29)	1.76 m	95	142	(Germany) HSG Blomberg-Lippe
7	P	Tabea Schmid	14 August 2003 (aged 21)	1.80 m	37	173	(Denmark) København Håndbold
8	RW	Mia Emmenegger	17 January 2005 (aged 19)	1.61 m	33	168	(Norway) Vipers Kristiansand
10	LB	Daphne Gautschi	9 July 2000 (aged 24)	1.73 m	55	186	(France) HBPC Handball Plan du Cuques
12	GK	Manuela Brütsch	14 February 1984 (aged 40)	1.76 m	175	0	(Switzerland) LC Brühl Handball
13	LW	Era Baumann	10 April 2007 (aged 17)	1.69 m	9	7	(Switzerland) GC Amicitia Zürich
15	LB	Norma Goldmann	6 October 2003 (aged 21)	1.72 m	21	19	(Sweden) Kristianstad Handboll
17	LB	Charlotte Kähr	27 June 2001 (aged 23)	1.72 m	50	57	(Germany) Buxtehuder SV
20	LW	Alessia Riner	8 January 2004 (aged 20)	1.70 m	37	88	(Germany) Neckarsulmer SU
21	RB	Malin Altherr	14 February 2003 (aged 21)	1.79 m	39	61	(Switzerland) LC Brühl Handball
22	CB	Nuria Bucher	21 March 2005 (aged 19)	1.79 m	22	58	(Switzerland) Spono Eagles
32	GK	Seraina Kuratli	18 April 2007 (aged 17)	1.79 m	5	1	(Switzerland) GC Amicitia Zürich
33	P	Nora Snedkerud	21 January 2005 (aged 19)	1.82 m	7	1	(Switzerland) Spono Eagles
34	RB	Emma Bächtiger	28 May 2004 (aged 20)	1.79 m	16	28	(Switzerland) LK Zug

== Group E ==
=== Austria ===
Head coach: (Netherlands) Monique Tijsterman

No.	Pos.	Name	Date of birth (age)	Height	App.	Goals	Club
1	GK	Lena Ivančok	29 March 2001 (aged 23)	1.84 m	49	3	(Germany) Neckarsulmer SU
3	LB	Katarina Pandza	17 April 2002 (aged 22)	1.80 m	43	183	(Croatia) RK Podravka Koprivnica
5	CB	Sonja Frey	22 April 1993 (aged 31)	1.69 m	125	573	(Austria) Hypo Niederösterreich
6	LW	Mirela Dedic	15 December 1991 (aged 32)	1.69 m	91	151	(Austria) Hypo Niederösterreich
9	CB	Patricia Kovács	26 May 1996 (aged 28)	1.78 m	92	326	(Austria) Hypo Niederösterreich
11	RW	Fabienne Tomasini	14 July 1997 (aged 27)	1.74 m	40	65	(Germany) LC Brühl Handball
14	RB	Klara Schlegel	7 May 2001 (aged 23)	1.82 m	26	43	(Hungary) Békéscsabai Előre NKSE
15	RW	Claudia Wess	15 June 1995 (aged 29)	1.80 m	94	93	(Austria) Hypo Niederösterreich
16	GK	Petra Blazek	15 June 1987 (aged 37)	1.82 m	237	4	(Austria) Hypo Niederösterreich
18	RB	Kristina Dramac	9 January 2002 (aged 22)	1.79 m	41	52	(Hungary) Debreceni VSC
21	GK	Antonija Mamic	26 June 1995 (aged 29)	1.84 m	25	1	(Poland) MKS Lublin
22	P	Stefanie Kaiser	31 October 1992 (aged 32)	1.81 m	105	142	(Germany) HSG Blomberg-Lippe
29	LB	Ines Ivančok	14 April 1998 (aged 26)	1.82 m	75	252	(Hungary) Mosonmagyaróvári KC SE
44	P	Nora Leitner	5 May 2002 (aged 22)	1.78 m	35	31	(Austria) Hypo Niederösterreich
54	LW	Santina Sabatnig	4 January 2004 (aged 20)	1.74 m	31	38	(Germany) HC Rödertal
57	LB	Josefine Hanfland	19 February 1996 (aged 28)	1.80 m	68	174	(Germany) Thüringer HC
64	CB	Ana Pandza	24 December 2003 (aged 20)	1.74 m	33	38	(Croatia) RK Podravka Koprivnica
67	LB	Johanna Reichert	31 December 2001 (aged 22)	1.78 m	47	104	(Germany) Thüringer HC

=== Norway ===
The squad was announced on 5 November 2024.

Head coach: (Iceland) Þórir Hergeirsson

No.	Pos.	Name	Date of birth (age)	Height	App.	Goals	Club
5	CB	Anniken Obaidli	22 June 1995 (aged 29)	1.72 m	10	10	(Norway) Storhamar HE
6	P	Maren Nyland Aardahl	2 March 1994 (aged 30)	1.83 m	66	110	(Denmark) Odense Håndbold
7	RB	Stine Skogrand	3 March 1993 (aged 31)	1.73 m	159	308	(Denmark) Ikast Håndbold
8	CB	Live Rushfeldt Deila	15 January 2000 (aged 24)	1.76 m	9	13	(Denmark) Team Esbjerg
12	GK	Silje Solberg-Østhassel	16 June 1990 (aged 34)	1.78 m	219	9	(Norway) Vipers Kristiansand
13	P	Kari Brattset Dale	15 February 1991 (aged 33)	1.84 m	137	364	(Hungary) Győri ETO KC
14	LB	Kristine Breistøl	23 August 1993 (aged 31)	1.93 m	94	148	(Hungary) Győri ETO KC
16	GK	Katrine Lunde	30 March 1980 (aged 44)	1.81 m	365	3	(Norway) Vipers Kristiansand
20	RW	Marit Røsberg Jacobsen	25 February 1994 (aged 30)	1.68 m	118	205	(Denmark) Team Esbjerg
21	LB	Ingvild Bakkerud	9 July 1995 (aged 29)	1.87 m	62	109	(Denmark) Ikast Håndbold
23	LW	Camilla Herrem	8 October 1986 (aged 38)	1.67 m	323	922	(Norway) Sola HK
24	LW	Sanna Solberg-Isaksen	16 June 1990 (aged 34)	1.78 m	218	421	(Denmark) Team Esbjerg
25	CB	Henny Reistad (c)	9 February 1999 (aged 25)	1.81 m	95	404	(Denmark) Team Esbjerg
26	RW	Emilie Hovden	5 April 1996 (aged 28)	1.63 m	45	91	(Hungary) Győri ETO KC
33	LB	Thale Rushfeldt Deila	15 January 2000 (aged 24)	1.78 m	52	101	(Denmark) Odense Håndbold
40	GK	Eli Marie Raasok	21 November 1996 (aged 28)	1.75 m	9	0	(Norway) Storhamar HE
46	P	Ane Høgseth	15 January 2001 (aged 23)	1.78 m	20	8	(Norway) Storhamar HE

=== Slovakia ===
Head coach: (Spain) Jorge Dueñas

No.	Pos.	Name	Date of birth (age)	Height	App.	Goals	Club
2	LW	Monika Pénzes	25 November 2003 (aged 21)	1.70 m	16	23	(Slovakia) HC DAC Dunajská Streda
6	RB	Alena Dvoršcáková	29 March 2002 (aged 22)	1.79 m	12	8	(Slovakia) IUVENTA Michalovce
9	P	Kristína Pastorková	16 September 1997 (aged 27)	1.74 m	37	29	(Slovakia) HC DAC Dunajská Streda
11	LB	Olívia Šcípová	21 August 2002 (aged 22)	1.78 m	24	27	(Slovakia) HK Slovan Duslo Šaľa
14	LB	Tatiana Šutranová	26 August 1997 (aged 27)	1.80 m	6	8	(Romania) CSM Deva
17	P	Diana Michalková	15 August 2000 (aged 24)	1.69 m	12	6	(Austria) UHC Stockerau
18	RW	Lenka Ratvajská	18 September 2000 (aged 24)	1.63 m	18	22	(Slovakia) HK Slovan Duslo Šaľa
26	LB	Nicol Nejedlíková	26 August 1999 (aged 25)	1.60 m	10	5	(Austria) UHC Tulln
28	RB	Barbora Lancz	28 July 2002 (aged 22)	1.71 m	48	245	(Hungary) Mosonmagyaróvári KC SE
29	P	Viktoria Györiova	13 May 2003 (aged 21)	1.74 m	27	19	(Hungary) NEKA
32	P	Bella Oláhová	12 December 2000 (aged 23)	1.73 m	15	1	(Slovakia) HK Slovan Duslo Šaľa
33	CB	Dorota Bacenková	25 June 2004 (aged 20)	1.70 m	12	17	(Slovakia) IUVENTA Michalovce
42	LB	Karin Bujnochová	1 November 1994 (aged 30)	1.75 m	72	123	(Hungary) Szombathelyi KKA
61	GK	Iryna Yablonska-Bobal	3 December 1991 (aged 32)	1.76 m	8	1	(Slovakia) IUVENTA Michalovce
74	CB	Erika Rajnohová	1 August 1998 (aged 26)	1.75 m	27	47	(Slovakia) HC DAC Dunajská Streda
77	GK	Barbora Jakubíková	29 March 2003 (aged 21)	1.83 m	5	0	(Slovakia) IUVENTA Michalovce
91	LW	Réka Bíziková	21 December 1991 (aged 32)	1.70 m	80	197	(Hungary) Komárom VSE

=== Slovenia ===
An 18-player squad was announced on 25 November.

Head coach: (Montenegro) Dragan Adžić

No.	Pos.	Name	Date of birth (age)	Height	App.	Goals	Club
3	P	Manca Jurič	18 January 1995 (aged 29)	1.75 m	26	17	(Slovenia) RK Krim
4	LB	Erin Novak	7 June 2002 (aged 22)	1.77 m	23	13	(Hungary) Kisvárdai KC
5	RW	Elena Erceg	7 June 2006 (aged 18)	1.73 m	3	9	(Slovenia) RK Krim
8	LW	Ema Abina	18 February 1999 (aged 25)	1.70 m	41	45	(Slovenia) RK Krim
9	LB	Ana Abina	30 July 1997 (aged 27)	1.80 m	82	96	(Slovenia) RK Krim
10	LB	Tjaša Stanko	5 November 1997 (aged 27)	1.73 m	114	455	(Slovenia) RK Krim
13	CB	Nuša Fegic	29 December 1998 (aged 25)	1.69 m	9	3	(Slovenia) ŽRK Ajdovščina
16	GK	Maja Vojnović	26 January 1998 (aged 26)	1.80 m	82	0	(Slovenia) RK Krim
17	P	Nataša Ljepoja	28 January 1996 (aged 28)	1.78 m	82	160	(Romania) SCM Râmnicu Vâlcea
19	LB	Špela Bajc	13 February 2001 (aged 23)	1.78 m	4	3	(Slovenia) ŽRD Litija
22	GK	Dijana Đajić	3 October 2004 (aged 20)	1.85 m	4	0	(Slovenia) RK Krim
24	LW	Tinkara Kogovšek	21 November 2004 (aged 20)	1.70 m	2	0	(Slovenia) ŽRD Litija
25	LB	Ivona Barukčić	2 March 2002 (aged 22)	1.77 m	4	5	(Slovenia) ŽRK Ajdovščina
28	LW	Maja Svetik	9 March 1996 (aged 28)	1.68 m	69	78	(Austria) BT Füchse
29	RW	Živa Čopi	5 August 1998 (aged 26)	1.63 m	19	16	(Slovenia) ŽRK Ajdovščina
31	P	Lana Puncer	31 March 2006 (aged 18)	1.81 m	2	0	(Slovenia) ŽRK Velenje
44	LB	Blažka Hauptman	16 August 2001 (aged 23)	1.73 m	3	3	(Spain) CB Atlético Guardés
50	LB	Teja Pogorelc	13 January 2006 (aged 18)	1.85 m	1	6	(Slovenia) RK Krim
71	LW	Ema Marković	17 August 2003 (aged 21)	1.70 m	21	16	(Slovenia) ŽRK Velenje

== Group F ==
=== Germany ===
A 19-player squad was announced on 6 November.

Head coach: Markus Gaugisch

No.	Pos.	Name	Date of birth (age)	Height	App.	Goals	Club
4	CB	Alina Grijseels	12 April 1996 (aged 28)	1.75 m	98	325	(Romania) CSM București
8	RB	Nina Engel	25 April 2003 (aged 21)	1.75 m	4	6	(Germany) HSG Bensheim-Auerbach
9	P	Lisa Antl	21 June 2000 (aged 24)	1.73 m	59	81	(Germany) Borussia Dortmund
10	CB	Mareike Thomaier	25 August 2000 (aged 24)	1.72 m	31	32	(Germany) HB Ludwigsburg
11	LB	Xenia Smits	22 April 1994 (aged 30)	1.85 m	130	311	(Germany) HB Ludwigsburg
20	LB	Emily Bölk	26 April 1998 (aged 26)	1.82 m	125	379	(Hungary) Ferencvárosi TC
23	LB	Annika Lott	7 December 1999 (aged 24)	1.80 m	38	66	(France) Brest Bretagne Handball
24	GK	Sarah Wachter	16 December 1999 (aged 24)	1.83 m	37	1	(Germany) Borussia Dortmund
27	RB	Julia Maidhof	13 March 1998 (aged 26)	1.76 m	61	205	(Romania) Râmnicu Vâlcea
29	LW	Antje Döll	3 October 1988 (aged 36)	1.70 m	91	245	(Germany) HB Ludwigsburg
30	RW	Jenny Behrend	20 January 1996 (aged 28)	1.70 m	70	135	(Germany) HB Ludwigsburg
31	LW	Alexia Hauf	18 July 1998 (aged 26)	1.63 m	17	30	(Germany) HSG Blomberg-Lippe
42	GK	Katharina Filter	4 February 1999 (aged 25)	1.81 m	62	2	(France) Brest Bretagne Handball
45	LW	Jolina Hühnstock	4 May 2001 (aged 23)	1.80 m	4	4	(Germany) Buxtehuder SV
77	RB	Viola Leuchter	15 June 2004 (aged 20)	1.87 m	28	63	(Germany) HB Ludwigsburg
93	P	Julia Behnke	28 March 1993 (aged 31)	1.80 m	118	212	(Germany) TuS Metzingen

=== Iceland ===
An 18-player squad was announced on 13 November.

Head coach: Arnar Pétursson

No.	Pos.	Name	Date of birth (age)	Height	App.	Goals	Club
1	GK	Elín Þorsteinsdóttir	30 November 1996 (aged 27)	1.78 m	65	2	(Denmark) Aarhus Håndbold
2	LB	Berglind Þorsteinsdóttir	2 January 1999 (aged 25)	1.80 m	30	6	(Iceland) Fram
3	LB	Andrea Jacobsen	9 April 1998 (aged 26)	1.82 m	58	101	(Germany) HSG Blomberg-Lippe
4	RW	Þórey Rósa Stefánsdóttir	14 August 1989 (aged 35)	1.67 m	142	407	(Iceland) Fram
5	RB	Rut Arnfjörð Jónsdóttir	21 July 1990 (aged 34)	1.76 m	119	245	(Iceland) Haukar
7	RW	Díana Dögg Magnúsdóttir	19 September 1997 (aged 27)	1.73 m	58	77	(Germany) HSG Blomberg-Lippe
8	LW	Perla Ruth Albertsdóttir	21 September 1996 (aged 28)	1.63 m	54	118	(Iceland) Selfoss
12	GK	Hafdís Renötudóttir	12 July 1997 (aged 27)	1.93 m	64	4	(Iceland) Valur
14	P	Elísa Elíasdóttir	31 July 2004 (aged 20)	1.75 m	19	15	(Iceland) Valur
15	LB	Jóhanna Margrét Sigurðardóttir	12 June 2002 (aged 22)	1.80 m	21	11	(Sweden) Kristianstad Handboll
17	CB	Elín Klara Þorkelsdóttir	14 September 2004 (aged 20)	1.68 m	18	55	(Iceland) Haukar
22	CB	Elín Rósa Magnúsdóttir	22 October 2002 (aged 22)	1.67 m	25	50	(Iceland) Valur
23	LW	Dana Björg Guðmundsdóttir	1 June 2002 (aged 22)	1.78 m	4	10	(Norway) Volda
24	RW	Katrín Anna Ásmundsdóttir	4 July 2004 (aged 20)	1.70 m	4	10	(Iceland) Grótta
25	RB	Thea Imani Sturludóttir	21 January 1997 (aged 27)	1.80 m	84	182	(Iceland) Valur
26	LB	Sunna Jónsdóttir	26 February 1989 (aged 35)	1.77 m	96	66	(Iceland) ÍBV
28	LW	Steinunn Björnsdóttir	10 March 1991 (aged 33)	1.78 m	53	80	(Iceland) Fram
33	P	Katrín Tinna Jensdóttir	31 July 2002 (aged 22)	1.81 m	23	10	(Iceland) ÍR

=== Netherlands ===
An 18-player squad was on announced on 5 November 2024. On 26 November, Laura van der Heijden replaced Alieke van Maurik due to an injury.

Head coach: (Sweden) Henrik Signell

No.	Pos.	Name	Date of birth (age)	Height	App.	Goals	Club
6	RB	Laura van der Heijden	27 June 1990 (aged 34)	1.73 m	289	863	(France) Chambray Touraine Handball
8	LB	Lois Abbingh (c)	13 August 1992 (aged 32)	1.78 m	219	903	(Norway) Vipers Kristiansand
9	CB	Larissa Nüsser	8 February 2000 (aged 24)	1.75 m	87	153	(Norway) Vipers Kristiansand
10	LB	Isa Ternede	26 January 2001 (aged 23)	1.68 m	6	9	(Germany) Buxtehuder SV
12	LW	Bo van Wetering	5 October 1999 (aged 25)	1.72 m	102	345	(Hungary) Győri ETO KC
14	LB	Judith van der Helm	13 January 2005 (aged 19)	1.82 m	19	4	(Netherlands) OTTO Work Force/VOC Amsterdam
16	P	Tamara Haggerty	29 April 1996 (aged 28)	1.78 m	46	38	(Hungary) DVSC Schaeffler
17	LB	Kim Molenaar	28 April 2002 (aged 22)	1.78 m	39	27	(Denmark) København Håndbold
19	P	Merel Freriks	6 January 1998 (aged 26)	1.75 m	89	155	(Norway) Vipers Kristiansand
20	CB	Inger Smits	17 September 1994 (aged 30)	1.79 m	103	191	(Romania) CSM București
22	LW	Zoë Sprengers	19 January 2000 (aged 24)	1.63 m	58	114	(Denmark) Nykøbing Falster Håndboldklub
24	P	Romee Maarschalkerweerd	24 September 2004 (aged 20)	1.78 m	9	17	(Denmark) HH Elite
26	RW	Angela Malestein	31 January 1993 (aged 31)	1.73 m	222	695	(Hungary) Ferencvárosi TC
29	RW	Sarah Dekker	8 March 2001 (aged 23)	1.69 m	5	8	(Germany) HSG Bensheim/Auerbach
30	GK	Rinka Duijndam	6 August 1997 (aged 27)	1.78 m	99	3	(Romania) CS Rapid București
38	GK	Yara ten Holte	23 November 1999 (aged 25)	1.75 m	66	4	(Denmark) Odense Håndbold
48	RB	Dione Housheer	26 September 1999 (aged 25)	1.80 m	101	325	(Hungary) Győri ETO KC

=== Ukraine ===
Head coach: Borys Chyzhov

No.	Pos.	Name	Date of birth (age)	Height	App.	Goals	Club
1	GK	Yudit Baloh	7 August 1995 (aged 29)	1.78 m	29	0	(Hungary) Vasas SC
2	CB	Liubov Rosokha	21 September 2006 (aged 18)	1.73 m	0	0	(Hungary) Kisvárdai KC
8	LB	Karina Soskyda	9 October 2005 (aged 19)	1.79 m	10	19	(Slovakia) IUVENTA Michalovce
9	LB	Vanessa Lakatosh	8 June 2006 (aged 18)	1.82 m	2	7	(Ukraine) HC Galychanka
10	P	Iryna Prokopiak	11 June 2003 (aged 21)	1.78 m	16	12	(Ukraine) HC Galychanka
13	RW	Daria Korets	29 February 2004 (aged 20)	1.74 m	0	0	(Ukraine) HC Spartak Kyiv
14	LW	Olha Makarenko	28 June 2001 (aged 23)	1.70 m	0	0	(Ukraine) HC Spartak Kyiv
16	GK	Viktoriia Saltaniuk	8 October 2000 (aged 24)	1.79 m	22	0	(Poland) KPR Kobierzyce
17	P	Andriyana Naumenko	12 December 1998 (aged 25)	1.75 m	11	17	(Romania) HC Zalău
19	CB	Tamara Smbatian	19 March 1995 (aged 29)	1.73 m	32	76	(Hungary) Alba Fehérvár KC
22	RW	Kateryna Kozak	6 December 2002 (aged 21)	1.81 m	8	6	(Ukraine) HC Galychanka
24	CB	Sofiia Bezrukova	6 November 1999 (aged 25)	1.78 m	0	0	(Czech Republic) Házená Kynžvart
30	LW	Anastasiia Tkach	15 June 2004 (aged 20)	1.76 m	0	0	(Ukraine) HC Galychanka
33	LB	Iryna Kompaniiets	21 November 1993 (aged 31)	1.76 m	29	48	(Slovakia) IUVENTA Michalovce
34	P	Karyna Kolodiuk	19 April 2001 (aged 23)	1.80 m	7	13	(Ukraine) HC Karpaty Uzhhorod
37	LB	Valeriia Nesterenko	31 December 2004 (aged 19)	1.80 m	4	11	(Ukraine) HC Karpaty Uzhhorod
69	GK	Mariia Poliak	15 March 2004 (aged 20)	1.72 m	0	0	(Ukraine) HC Galychanka
77	P	Lilia Gorilska	26 February 1988 (aged 36)	1.85 m	28	62	(Hungary) Moyra-Budaörs Handball
81	RB	Nhetely Ermina Minissale	5 April 2001 (aged 23)	1.80 m	0	0	(Ukraine) HC Spartak Kyiv
