= 2026 European Women's Handball Championship squads =

The following is a list of squads for each nation competing at the 2026 European Women's Handball Championship.

Each squad consists of up to 20 players, and 16 players are selected on each matchday. In addition, there is a maximum of six players who can be replaced during the tournament, from the long list, consisting of 35 players.

Age, caps and goals correct as of 3 December 2026.

== Group A ==
=== Hungary ===
The squad was announced on 16 November 2026.

Head coach: Vladimir Golovin

| No. | Pos. | Name | Date of birth (age) | Height | App. | Goals | Club |
|---|---|---|---|---|---|---|---|
| 4 | P | Petra Tóvizi | 15 March 1999 (aged 27) | 1.78 m | 116 | 155 | (Hungary) Debreceni VSC |
| 5 | LB | Luca Csíkos | 25 February 2005 (aged 21) | 1.79 m | 21 | 24 | (Germany) Thüringer HC |
| 8 | P | Kata Juhász | 2 January 2004 (aged 22) | 1.86 m | 4 | 2 | (Hungary) Debreceni VSC |
| 9 | LW | Júlia Hársfalvi | 12 November 1996 (aged 30) | 1.68 m | 23 | 43 | (Hungary) Ferencvárosi TC |
| 10 | LB | Lea Faragó | 22 July 2005 (aged 21) | 1.75 m | 19 | 25 | (Hungary) Esztergomi KC |
| 14 | CB | Blanka Kajdon | 12 June 2002 (aged 24) | 1.71 m | 3 | 0 | (Hungary) Váci NKSE |
| 16 | GK | Blanka Böde-Bíró | 22 September 1994 (aged 32) | 1.87 m | 137 | 3 | (Hungary) Ferencvárosi TC |
| 18 | RW | Anett Kovács | 12 November 1994 (aged 32) | 1.68 m | 28 | 51 | (Hungary) Esztergomi KC |
| 19 | LW | Gréta Márton | 3 October 1999 (aged 27) | 1.73 m | 114 | 276 | (Hungary) Ferencvárosi TC |
| 20 | LP | Apollónia Szmolek | 8 August 2002 (aged 24) | 1.87 m | 17 | 7 | (Hungary) Esztergomi KC |
| 28 | RB | Nikoletta Papp | 23 July 1996 (aged 30) | 1.82 m | 90 | 76 | (Romania) CSM Slatina |
| 31 | GK | Zsófi Szemerey | 2 June 1994 (aged 32) | 1.83 m | 56 | 2 | (Hungary) Győri ETO KC |
| 38 | CB | Petra Vámos | 14 September 2000 (aged 26) | 1.75 m | 108 | 300 | (France) Metz Handball |
| 42 | RB | Katrin Klujber | 21 April 1999 (aged 27) | 1.70 m | 116 | 632 | (Hungary) Ferencvárosi TC |
| 48 | RW | Dorottya Faluvégi | 31 March 1998 (aged 28) | 1.70 m | 58 | 87 | (Romania) CSM București |
| 59 | LB | Csenge Kuczora | 26 January 2000 (aged 26) | 1.76 m | 79 | 254 | (Romania) CSM București |
| 66 | RW | Viktória Győri-Lukács | 31 October 1995 (aged 31) | 1.68 m | 141 | 446 | (Hungary) Győri ETO KC |
| 74 | GK | Anna Bukovszky | 30 June 2002 (aged 24) | 1.75 m | 16 | 0 | (Hungary) Esztergomi KC |
| 88 | LB | Fanni Horváth | 29 October 2005 (aged 21) | 1.74 m | 0 | 0 | (Hungary) Esztergomi KC |

=== Iceland ===
The squad was announced on 30 October 2026.

Head coach: Arnar Pétursson

| No. | Pos. | Name | Date of birth (age) | Height | App. | Goals | Club |
|---|---|---|---|---|---|---|---|
| 7 | RW | Díana Dögg Magnúsdóttir | 19 September 1997 (aged 29) | 1.75 m | 77 | 104 | (Germany) HSG Blomberg-Lippe |
| 9 | LW | Lilja Ágústsdóttir | 30 April 2004 (aged 22) | 1.70 m | 29 | 24 | (Germany) BSV Sachsen Zwickau |
| 12 | GK | Hafdís Renötudóttir | 12 July 1997 (aged 29) | 1.93 m | 82 | 5 | (Iceland) Valur |
| 14 | P | Elísa Elíasdóttir | 31 July 2004 (aged 22) | 1.76 m | 35 | 34 | (Iceland) Valur |
| 17 | CB | Elín Klara Þorkelsdóttir | 14 September 2004 (aged 22) | 1.69 m | 39 | 165 | (Sweden) IK Sävehof |
| 19 | CB | Lovisa Thompson | 27 October 1999 (aged 27) | 1.72 m | 43 | 79 | (Portugal) S.L. Benfica |
| 20 | GK | Sara Sif Helgadóttir | 8 June 2000 (aged 26) | 1.71 m | 27 | 0 | (Iceland) Haukar Handball |
| 21 | CB | Sandra Erlingsdóttir | 27 July 1998 (aged 28) | 1.60 m | 51 | 212 | (Iceland) ÍBV |
| 22 | CB | Elín Rósa Magnúsdóttir | 22 October 2002 (aged 24) | 1.67 m | 44 | 93 | (Germany) HSG Blomberg-Lippe |
| 24 | RW | Katrín Anna Ásmundsdóttir | 4 July 2004 (aged 22) | 1.70 m | 26 | 42 | (Iceland) Fram |
| 25 | RB | Thea Imani Sturludóttir | 21 January 1997 (aged 29) | 1.79 m | 100 | 233 | (Romania) SCM Craiova |
| 33 | P | Katrín Tinna Jensdóttir | 31 July 2002 (aged 24) | 1.81 m | 39 | 48 | (Denmark) HH Elite |
| 34 | LB | Alfa Brá Oddsdóttir Hagalín | 27 April 2005 (aged 21) | 1.80 m | 18 | 11 | (Germany) Thüringer HC |
| 36 | RW | Sonja Lind Sigsteinsdóttir | 14 January 2004 (aged 22) | 1.70 m | 9 | 8 | (Iceland) Haukar Handball |
| 37 | LW | Rakel Oddný Guðmundsdóttir | 26 June 2004 (aged 22) | 1.68 m | 16 | 19 | (Iceland) Haukar Handball |
| 43 | CB | Matthildur Lilja Jónsdóttir | 13 September 2004 (aged 22) | 1.76 m | 13 | 1 | (Iceland) ÍR |
| 45 | LB | Sara Dögg Hjaltadóttir | 3 July 2000 (aged 26) | 1.79 m | 9 | 13 | (Iceland) ÍR |

=== Montenego ===
A 20-player squad was announced on 16 November 2026.

Head coach: Suzana Lazović

| No. | Pos. | Name | Date of birth (age) | Height | App. | Goals | Club |
|---|---|---|---|---|---|---|---|
| 1 | GK | Andrea Škerović | 10 April 2004 (aged 22) | 1.81 m | 9 | 0 | (Montenegro) ŽRK Budućnost |
| 2 | RW | Anastasija Marsenić | 24 February 2003 (aged 23) | 1.72 m | 36 | 58 | (Norway) Storhamar HE |
| 6 | LB | Elena Mitrović | 22 December 2006 (aged 19) | 1.78 m | 14 | 4 | (Poland) Elmas-KPS APR Radom |
| 9 | LB | Đurđina Jauković | 24 February 1997 (aged 29) | 1.85 m | 127 | 385 | (Montenegro) ŽRK Budućnost |
| 10 | CB | Matea Šošo | 24 April 1998 (aged 28) | 1.68 m | 82 | 152 | (Croatia) RK Podravka Koprivnica |
| 11 | P | Ivana Godeč | 11 May 2001 (aged 25) | 1.82 m | 50 | 51 | (Montenegro) ŽRK Budućnost |
| 12 | GK | Armelle Attingré | 15 January 1989 (aged 37) | 1.85 m | 25 | 2 | (Montenegro) ŽRK Budućnost |
| 13 | LW | Dijana Mugoša | 22 October 1995 (aged 31) | 1.72 m | 79 | 193 | (Romania) SCM Craiova |
| 15 | RB | Jelena Vukčević | 11 December 2004 (aged 21) | 1.70 m | 31 | 53 | (Montenegro) ŽRK Budućnost |
| 17 | CB | Nikolina Marković | 26 January 2004 (aged 22) | 1.73 m | 9 | 9 | (France) Piraths Handball |
| 19 | LB | Mina Novović | 3 May 2003 (aged 23) | 1.82 m | 7 | 6 | (Romania) CSM Iași 2020 |
| 22 | LB | Andrijana Popović | 20 April 2002 (aged 24) | 1.85 m | 30 | 4 | (Montenegro) ŽRK Budućnost |
| 23 | CB | Ivana Savić | 2 July 2008 (aged 18) | 1.85 m | 3 | 7 | (Montenegro) ŽRK Budućnost |
| 24 | RB | Tanja Ivanović | 5 November 1996 (aged 30) | 1.82 m | 46 | 32 | (Romania) CS Rapid București |
| 33 | GK | Anastasija Babović | 13 December 2000 (aged 25) | 1.84 m | 35 | 0 | (Romania) CSM Târgu Jiu |
| 34 | P | Tatjana Brnović | 9 November 1998 (aged 28) | 1.84 m | 105 | 219 | (Romania) CSM București |
| 37 | RW | Nina Bulatović | 9 December 1996 (aged 29) | 1.72 m | 64 | 87 | (Montenegro) ŽRK Budućnost |
| 71 | P | Bobana Klikovac | 19 July 1995 (aged 31) | 1.81 m | 30 | 15 | (Romania) HC Dunărea Brăila |
| 77 | LB | Nina Ramusović | 18 July 2007 (aged 19) | 1.78 m | 3 | 1 | (Germany) BSV Sachsen Zwickau |
| 98 | LW | Mela Mehmedović | 12 November 2003 (aged 23) | 1.70 m | 3 | 2 | (Romania) CS Rapid București |

=== Slovenia ===
The squad was announced on 11 November 2026.

Head coach: (Montenegro) Dragan Adžić

| No. | Pos. | Name | Date of birth (age) | Height | App. | Goals | Club |
|---|---|---|---|---|---|---|---|
| 3 | P | Manca Jurič | 18 January 1995 (aged 31) | 1.74 m | 42 | 39 | (Croatia) RK Lokomotiva Zagreb |
| 4 | LB | Erin Novak | 7 June 2002 (aged 24) | 1.77 m | 44 | 36 | (Italy) Handball Erice |
| 8 | LW | Ema Abina | 18 February 1999 (aged 27) | 1.70 m | 61 | 79 | (Slovenia) RK Krim |
| 9 | LB | Ana Abina | 30 July 1997 (aged 29) | 1.80 m | 99 | 157 | (Slovenia) RK Krim |
| 10 | LB | Tjaša Stanko | 5 November 1997 (aged 29) | 1.73 m | 129 | 569 | (Hungary) Győri ETO KC |
| 11 | LB | Ema Hrvatin | 4 January 2000 (aged 26) | 1.77 m | 35 | 57 | (Romania) CSM Târgu Jiu |
| 12 | GK | Zala Vuk | 3 December 2005 (aged 21) | 1.77 m | 3 | 0 | (Slovenia) ŽRK Ajdovščina |
| 13 | CB | Nuša Fegic | 29 December 1998 (aged 27) | 1.69 m | 26 | 56 | (Poland) Enea MKS Gniezno |
| 16 | GK | Maja Vojnović | 26 January 1998 (aged 28) | 1.80 m | 100 | 9 | (Slovenia) RK Krim |
| 17 | P | Nataša Ljepoja | 28 January 1996 (aged 30) | 1.78 m | 99 | 217 | (Croatia) RK Podravka Koprivnica |
| 18 | CB | Nina Zulić | 4 December 1995 (aged 30) | 1.70 m | 81 | 205 | (Slovenia) RK Krim |
| 19 | LB | Špela Bajc | 13 February 2001 (aged 25) | 1.78 m | 23 | 27 | (Slovenia) ŽRK Ajdovščina |
| 22 | GK | Dijana Đajić | 3 October 2004 (aged 22) | 1.85 m | 24 | 0 | (Germany) Frankfurter HC |
| 24 | LW | Tinkara Kogovšek | 21 November 2004 (aged 22) | 1.70 m | 15 | 24 | (Slovenia) RK Krim |
| 25 | LB | Ivona Barukčić | 2 March 2002 (aged 24) | 1.77 m | 21 | 25 | (Slovenia) ŽRK Ajdovščina |
| 29 | RW | Živa Čopi | 5 August 1998 (aged 28) | 1.63 m | 38 | 41 | (Turkey) Bursa BBSK |
| 31 | P | Lana Puncer | 31 March 2006 (aged 20) | 1.81 m | 21 | 9 | (Slovenia) RK Krim |
| 71 | LW | Ema Marković | 17 August 2003 (aged 23) | 1.70 m | 41 | 53 | (Slovenia) RK Krim |

== Group B ==
=== North Macedonia ===
A 19-player squad announced on 17 November 2026.

Head coach: Igor Marković

| No. | Pos. | Name | Date of birth (age) | Height | App. | Goals | Club |
|---|---|---|---|---|---|---|---|
| 7 | P | Ivana Gakidova | 27 February 1995 (aged 31) | 1.80 m | 26 | 34 | (Poland) Szczypiorno Kalisz |
| 10 | LB | Ana Marija Kolarovska | 18 August 2002 (aged 24) | 1.73 m | 8 | 10 | (North Macedonia) WHC Gjorche Petrov |
| 11 | RB | Marija Guguljanova | 11 November 1999 (aged 27) | 1.73 m | 12 | 5 | (Poland) MKS Piotrcovia |
| 12 | GK | Dragana Petkovska | 12 June 1996 (aged 30) | 1.75 m | 30 | 0 | (Poland) Szczypiorno Kalisz |
| 13 | P | Ivana Djatevska | 13 April 2003 (aged 23) | 1.78 m | 23 | 10 | (Hungary) Szombathelyi KKA |
| 15 | LB | Marija Jankulovska | 2 November 2005 (aged 21) | 1.75 m | 12 | 35 | (France) Paris 92 |
| 16 | GK | Andrea Ilikj | 18 June 2001 (aged 25) | 1.72 m | 6 | 0 | (Czech Republic) DHC Plzeň |
| 17 | RW | Teodora Dukoska | 10 June 2004 (aged 22) | 1.70 m | 2 | 3 | (Slovakia) IUVENTA Michalovce |
| 19 | RB | Iva Mladenovska | 14 January 2007 (aged 19) | 1.80 m | 13 | 25 | (Germany) BVB Dortmund |
| 26 | GK | Jovana Micevska | 26 July 2000 (aged 26) | 1.76 m | 27 | 3 | (Serbia) ŽRK Crvena zvezda |
| 30 | RB | Jovana Kiprijanovska | 30 December 2001 (aged 24) | 1.84 m | 18 | 38 | (Poland) Energa Start Elbląg |
| 31 | LB | Andrea Sedloska | 6 March 2003 (aged 23) | 1.83 m | 15 | 25 | (Turkey) Üsküdar BSK |
| 32 | CB | Ivana Arsenievska | 8 December 2003 (aged 22) | 1.75 m | 10 | 15 | (Poland) Energa Start Elbląg |
| 33 | RW | Sara Ristovska | 9 September 1996 (aged 30) | 1.69 m | 56 | 272 | (Romania) CS Rapid Bucuresti |
| 35 | LW | Leona Milenkoska | 12 October 2007 (aged 19) | 1.83 m | 5 | 5 | (North Macedonia) WHC Vardar |
| 41 | LB | Sara Stefanoska | 11 January 2005 (aged 21) | 1.78 m | 4 | 9 | (Hungary) Eszterházy SC |
| 43 | LW | Emilijana Rizoska | 21 May 2005 (aged 21) | 1.64 m | 11 | 17 | (North Macedonia) WHC Gjorche Petrov |
| 91 | CB | Bojana Koceva | 29 September 2004 (aged 22) | 1.68 m | 12 | 26 | (North Macedonia) WHC Gjorche Petrov |
| 93 | P | Katerina Damjanoska | 19 May 2003 (aged 23) | 1.73 m | 12 | 9 | (Romania) CSM Târgu Mureș |

=== Norway ===
The squad was announced on 30 October 2026.

Head coach: Ole Gjekstad

| No. | Pos. | Name | Date of birth (age) | Height | App. | Goals | Club |
|---|---|---|---|---|---|---|---|
| 3 | CB | Frida Brandbu Andersen | 27 September 2002 (aged 24) | 1.73 m | 5 | 9 | (Norway) Sola HK |
| 8 | CB | Live Rushfeldt Deila | 15 January 2000 (aged 26) | 1.76 m | 46 | 56 | (Denmark) Team Esbjerg |
| 9 | RB | Nora Mørk | 5 April 1991 (aged 35) | 1.69 m | 207 | 958 | (Denmark) Team Esbjerg |
| 12 | GK | Silje Solberg-Østhassel | 16 June 1990 (aged 36) | 1.78 m | 232 | 9 | (Denmark) Team Esbjerg |
| 13 | P | Kari Brattset Dale | 15 February 1991 (aged 35) | 1.83 m | 150 | 401 | (Hungary) Győri ETO KC |
| 14 | LB | Kristine Breistøl | 23 August 1993 (aged 33) | 1.92 m | 128 | 229 | (Hungary) Győri ETO KC |
| 17 | RW | Tuva Høve | 11 June 2000 (aged 26) | 1.75 m | 9 | 15 | (Romania) SCM Râmnicu Vâlcea |
| 18 | LW | Stella Waagan Kruse | 7 May 2005 (aged 21) | 1.70 m | 5 | 7 | (Norway) Tertnes HE |
| 19 | P | Selma Henriksen | 25 July 2002 (aged 24) | 1.79 m | 22 | 41 | (Norway) Sola HK |
| 21 | LB | Ingvild Bakkerud | 9 July 1995 (aged 31) | 1.83 m | 91 | 159 | (Denmark) Odense Håndbold |
| 25 | CB | Henny Reistad (c) | 9 February 1999 (aged 27) | 1.81 m | 126 | 598 | (Denmark) Team Esbjerg |
| 26 | RW | Emilie Hovden | 5 April 1996 (aged 30) | 1.63 m | 79 | 209 | (Hungary) Győri ETO KC |
| 27 | LB | Henriette Espetvedt Eggen | 16 December 2002 (aged 23) | 1.84 m | 0 | 0 | (Denmark) Team Esbjerg |
| 29 | LW | Kristin Venn | 5 March 1994 (aged 32) | 1.68 m | 11 | 26 | (Norway) Storhamar HE |
| 31 | CB | Mia Svele | 16 April 2001 (aged 25) | 1.74 m | 1 | 1 | (Denmark) Nykøbing Falster |
| 33 | LB | Thale Rushfeldt Deila | 15 January 2000 (aged 26) | 1.78 m | 85 | 205 | (Hungary) Győri ETO KC |
| 40 | GK | Eli Marie Raasok | 21 November 1996 (aged 30) | 1.76 m | 36 | 1 | (Norway) Storhamar HE |
| 44 | GK | June Krogh | 2 December 2003 (aged 23) | 1.87 m | 19 | 0 | (Romania) SCM Râmnicu Vâlcea |
| 46 | P | Ane Høgseth | 15 January 2001 (aged 25) | 1.78 m | 34 | 16 | (Norway) Storhamar HE |

=== Romania ===
The squad was announced on 13 November 2026.

Head coach: Ovidiu Mihai Mihaila

| No. | Pos. | Name | Date of birth (age) | Height | App. | Goals | Club |
|---|---|---|---|---|---|---|---|
| 1 | GK | Bianca Curmenț | 12 June 1997 (aged 29) | 1.82 m | 23 | 1 | (Romania) HC Dunărea Brăila |
| 2 | RW | Mihaela Mihai | 15 December 2004 (aged 21) | 1.77 m | 20 | 34 | (Romania) HC Dunărea Brăila |
| 3 | P | Yaroslava Burlachenko | 14 May 1992 (aged 34) | 1.78 m | 6 | 3 | (Romania) Gloria Bistrița |
| 7 | LW | Mariam Mohamed | 27 August 2004 (aged 22) | 1.73 m | 2 | 2 | (Romania) HC Dunărea Brăila |
| 12 | GK | Diana Ciucă | 1 June 2000 (aged 26) | 1.80 m | 30 | 1 | (Romania) CS Rapid București |
| 13 | CB | Cristina Laslo | 10 April 1996 (aged 30) | 1.77 m | 93 | 164 | (Romania) HC Dunărea Brăila |
| 14 | LB | Bianca Bazaliu | 30 July 1997 (aged 29) | 1.82 m | 87 | 45 | (Romania) CSM Corona Brașov |
| 17 | CB | Rebeca Necula | 17 May 2003 (aged 23) | 1.67 m | 20 | 21 | (Romania) HC Dunărea Brăila |
| 22 | RW | Beatrice Raicea | 13 March 2005 (aged 21) | 1.65 m | 2 | 4 | (Romania) HC Dunărea Brăila |
| 24 | CB | Alisia Boicuic | 20 July 2005 (aged 21) | 1.77 m | 19 | 40 | (Romania) HC Dunărea Brăila |
| 27 | P | Lorena Ostase | 25 July 1997 (aged 29) | 1.79 m | 65 | 206 | (Romania) Gloria Bistrița |
| 28 | LB | Diana Lixăndroiu | 14 August 2005 (aged 21) | 1.84 m | 13 | 12 | (Romania) HC Dunărea Brăila |
| 42 | CB | Elena Roșu | 24 March 1997 (aged 29) | 1.75 m | 21 | 46 | (Romania) HC Dunărea Brăila |
| 44 | LW | Éva Kerekes | 7 April 2001 (aged 25) | 1.77 m | 11 | 12 | (Romania) CSM Corona Brașov |
| 53 | GK | Iulia Dumanska | 15 August 1996 (aged 30) | 1.76 m | 79 | 0 | (Romania) CSM București |
| 70 | CB | Andreea Popa | 3 June 2000 (aged 26) | 1.75 m | 33 | 57 | (Romania) CSM Corona Brașov |
| 77 | P | Crina Pintea | 3 April 1990 (aged 36) | 1.92 m | 120 | 204 | (Romania) CSM București |
| 99 | LB | Sorina Grozav | 27 May 1999 (aged 27) | 1.75 m | 32 | 93 | (Romania) CSM Corona Brașov |

=== Switzerland ===
The squad was announced on 11 November 2026.

Head coach: (Norway) Knut Ove Joa

| No. | Pos. | Name | Date of birth (age) | Height | App. | Goals | Club |
|---|---|---|---|---|---|---|---|
| 1 | GK | Lea Schüpbach | 10 September 1997 (aged 29) | 1.79 m | 75 | 0 | (Switzerland) Yellow Winterthur |
| 4 | CB | Laurentia Wolff | 19 August 2003 (aged 23) | 1.77 m | 38 | 28 | (Germany) VfL Oldenburg |
| 8 | RW | Mia Emmenegger | 17 January 2005 (aged 21) | 1.61 m | 60 | 275 | (Denmark) Team Esbjerg |
| 10 | LB | Daphne Gautschi | 9 July 2000 (aged 26) | 1.72 m | 82 | 304 | (France) Toulon Métropole Var Handball |
| 11 | LB | Clairebel Coker | 21 February 2005 (aged 21) | 1.77 m | 13 | 6 | (Switzerland) LC Brühl Handball |
| 13 | LW | Era Baumann | 10 April 2007 (aged 19) | 1.67 m | 36 | 82 | (Denmark) Viborg HK |
| 14 | CB | Nuria Bucher | 21 March 2005 (aged 21) | 1.79 m | 45 | 95 | (Germany) HSG Blomberg-Lippe |
| 17 | LB | Charlotte Kähr | 27 June 2001 (aged 25) | 1.75 m | 74 | 69 | (Germany) TuS Metzingen |
| 18 | RB | Lea Schärer | 6 September 2005 (aged 21) | 1.70 m | 0 | 0 | (Switzerland) GC Amicitia Zürich |
| 20 | LW | Alessia Riner | 8 January 2004 (aged 22) | 1.74 m | 49 | 115 | (Germany) Sport-Union Neckarsulm |
| 21 | RB | Malin Altherr | 14 February 2003 (aged 23) | 1.79 m | 60 | 84 | (Switzerland) LC Brühl Handball |
| 23 | LB | Celia Heinzer | 19 May 2002 (aged 24) | 1.83 m | 25 | 33 | (Germany) VfL Waiblingen |
| 27 | RB | Yara Brunett | 22 June 2007 (aged 19) | 1.78 m | 5 | 0 | (Switzerland) LK Zug |
| 30 | GK | Claire Hartz | 2 September 2005 (aged 21) | 1.81 m | 11 | 0 | (Switzerland) LC Brühl Handball |
| 32 | GK | Seraina Kuratli | 18 April 2007 (aged 19) | 1.76 m | 24 | 1 | (Switzerland) GC Amicitia Zürich |
| 33 | P | Nora Snedkerud | 21 January 2005 (aged 21) | 1.80 m | 33 | 27 | (France) Piraths Handball |
| 44 | P | Joline Erni | 18 April 2006 (aged 20) | 1.75 m | 13 | 13 | (Switzerland) GC Amicitia Zürich |
| 83 | RW | Sev Albrecht | 26 April 2005 (aged 21) | 1.69 m | 10 | 4 | (Germany) HSG Freiburg |

== Group C ==
=== Denmark ===
The squad was announced on 9 November 2026.

Head coach: Helle Thomsen

| No. | Pos. | Name | Date of birth (age) | Height | App. | Goals | Club |
|---|---|---|---|---|---|---|---|
| 1 | GK | Sandra Toft | 18 October 1989 (aged 37) | 1.74 m | 199 | 2 | (Hungary) Győri ETO KC |
| 2 | CB | Stine Nørklit Lønborg | 21 December 1998 (aged 27) | 1.70 m | 7 | 9 | (France) JDA Dijon Handball |
| 4 | RB | Helene Kindberg | 13 January 1998 (aged 28) | 1.79 m | 31 | 46 | (Denmark) Team Esbjerg |
| 6 | CB | Helena Elver | 1 March 1998 (aged 28) | 1.75 m | 62 | 148 | (Hungary) Győri ETO KC |
| 8 | LB | Anne Mette Hansen (c) | 25 August 1994 (aged 32) | 1.82 m | 209 | 606 | (Romania) CSM București |
| 10 | P | Kathrine Heindahl | 26 March 1992 (aged 34) | 1.82 m | 150 | 287 | (Denmark) Ikast Håndbold |
| 12 | GK | Anna Kristensen (c) | 25 October 2000 (aged 26) | 1.84 m | 66 | 0 | (Hungary) Ferencvárosi TC |
| 15 | P | Sofie Bardrum | 3 April 1996 (aged 30) | 1.75 m | 13 | 37 | (Denmark) Viborg HK |
| 23 | CB | Kristina Jørgensen | 17 January 1998 (aged 28) | 1.87 m | 157 | 482 | (France) Metz Handball |
| 25 | RW | Trine Østergaard (c) | 17 October 1991 (aged 35) | 1.66 m | 224 | 478 | (Denmark) Viborg HK |
| 28 | LB | Laura Borg | 21 February 2004 (aged 22) | 1.87 m | 24 | 7 | (Denmark) Ikast Håndbold |
| 32 | LB | Mie Højlund (c) | 24 October 1997 (aged 29) | 1.80 m | 129 | 276 | (Denmark) Odense Håndbold |
| 33 | LW | Emma Friis | 31 October 1999 (aged 27) | 1.62 m | 99 | 286 | (Romania) CSM București |
| 41 | LW | Elma Halilcevic | 18 June 2000 (aged 26) | 1.68 m | 60 | 146 | (Denmark) Odense Håndbold |
| 42 | CB | Michala Møller | 16 February 2000 (aged 26) | 1.78 m | 65 | 133 | (Hungary) Ferencvárosi TC |
| 44 | RW | Cecilie Brandt | 16 November 2001 (aged 25) | 1.69 m | 28 | 48 | (Denmark) Ikast Håndbold |
| 45 | LB | Julie Scaglione | 20 August 2004 (aged 22) | 1.83 m | 32 | 99 | (Denmark) Team Esbjerg |

=== Greece ===
A 21-player squad announced on 19 November 2026.

Head coach: Danilos Menelaos

| No. | Pos. | Name | Date of birth (age) | Height | App. | Goals | Club |
|---|---|---|---|---|---|---|---|
| 1 | GK | Magdalini Kepesidou | 21 April 1997 (aged 29) | 1.78 m | 51 | 6 | (Greece) O.F.N. Ionias |
| 2 | RB | Eleni Kerlidi | 23 October 2000 (aged 26) | 1.78 m | 26 | 62 | (Greece) AC PAOK |
| 3 | RB | Panagiota Argiropolou | 16 June 1998 (aged 28) | 1.74 m | 29 | 31 | (Greece) AEP Panorama |
| 4 | LB | Agni Papadopoulou | 4 December 2003 (aged 22) | 1.75 m | 9 | 10 | (Greece) AEP Panorama |
| 6 | LW | Maria Mentesidou | 31 May 1997 (aged 29) | 1.67 m | 19 | 12 | (Greece) AC PAOK |
| 7 | CB | Aikaterini Koukmisi | 13 September 2000 (aged 26) | 1.69 m | 11 | 3 | (Greece) AEP Panorama |
| 8 | RW | Vasiliki Gkatziou | 8 October 1997 (aged 29) | 1.68 m | 25 | 57 | (Greece) AC PAOK |
| 10 | CB | Nikolina Kepesidou | 18 January 2002 (aged 24) | 1.78 m | 30 | 43 | (Greece) O.F.N. Ionias |
| 13 | RW | Evgenia Samolada | 31 January 2000 (aged 26) | 1.80 m | 19 | 34 | (Greece) AEK Athens |
| 14 | LB | Erika Zeneli | 13 May 2000 (aged 26) | 1.75 m | 31 | 24 | (Greece) AEK Athens |
| 16 | GK | Emmanouela Tsiknaki | 20 September 2000 (aged 26) | 1.67 m | 28 | 0 | (Greece) AC PAOK |
| 18 | RB | Despoina Fragkou | 18 May 1999 (aged 27) | 1.75 m | 27 | 14 | (Greece) AEK Athens |
| 20 | CB | Olympia Andritsou | 8 January 1998 (aged 28) | 1.67 m | 36 | 120 | (Greece) AC PAOK |
| 21 | RB | Aikaterini Mania | 28 September 1998 (aged 28) | 1.73 m | 32 | 47 | (Greece) AEK Athens |
| 22 | LB | Lamprini Tsakalou | 7 August 1993 (aged 33) | 1.76 m | 38 | 192 | (Greece) AC PAOK |
| 23 | LW | Eleftheria-Aikaterini Trochidou | 1 January 2001 (aged 25) | 1.65 m | 8 | 8 | (Greece) AC PAOK |
| 31 | CB | Anastasia Vasileiou | 23 July 2001 (aged 25) | 1.71 m | 9 | 6 | (Greece) GAS Kamaterou |
| 32 | P | Ioanna Christopoulou | 7 August 2001 (aged 25) | 1.70 m | 8 | 2 | (Greece) GAS Kamaterou |
| 39 | CB | Avramina Sevdili | 18 July 2002 (aged 24) | 1.71 m | 24 | 32 | (Greece) AC PAOK |
| 40 | GK | Athina Kaprinioti | 25 September 2004 (aged 22) | 1.82 m | 4 | 0 | (Greece) Anagennisi Artas |
| 99 | LW | Christa-Maria Stougiannidou | 26 April 1996 (aged 30) | 1.67 m | 26 | 45 | (Greece) O.F.N. Ionias |

=== Spain ===
A 20-player squad announced on 13 November 2026.

Head coach: Joaquín Rocamora

| No. | Pos. | Name | Date of birth (age) | Height | App. | Goals | Club |
|---|---|---|---|---|---|---|---|
| 2 | CB | Elba Álvarez | 26 May 2001 (aged 25) | 1.70 m | 33 | 64 | (Spain) BM Bera Bera |
| 10 | P | Elisabet Cesáreo | 25 May 1999 (aged 27) | 1.77 m | 77 | 75 | (Poland) MKS Zagłębie Lubin |
| 16 | GK | Maddi Aalla | 1 January 1997 (aged 29) | 1.73 m | 23 | 0 | (Hungary) Alba Fehérvár KC |
| 17 | LW | Jennifer Gutiérrez Bermejo | 20 May 1995 (aged 31) | 1.69 m | 131 | 326 | (Romania) CS Gloria Bistrița |
| 18 | RW | Maitane Etxeberria | 15 January 1997 (aged 29) | 1.69 m | 114 | 212 | (Spain) BM Bera Bera |
| 24 | P | Lysa Tchaptchet | 20 December 2001 (aged 24) | 1.86 m | 74 | 94 | (Hungary) Ferencvárosi TC |
| 27 | LB | Danila So Delgado | 19 September 2001 (aged 25) | 1.73 m | 50 | 221 | (Romania) CS Gloria Bistrița |
| 31 | P | Kelly Fonkeng | 1 September 2006 (aged 20) | 1.86 m | 4 | 4 | (Spain) BM Bera Bera |
| 34 | CB | Alicia Fernández | 21 December 1992 (aged 33) | 1.73 m | 127 | 292 | (Poland) MKS Zagłębie Lubin |
| 37 | CB | Paola Bernabé | 11 August 2003 (aged 23) | 1.73 m | 14 | 4 | (Spain) CB Elche |
| 45 | RB | Eider Poles | 10 November 2005 (aged 21) | 1.72 m | 5 | 19 | (Spain) Rocasa Gran Canaria |
| 55 | GK | Lucía Prades | 5 October 2001 (aged 25) | 1.79 m | 17 | 3 | (Spain) BM Bera Bera |
| 58 | RB | María Prieto O'Mullony | 3 October 1997 (aged 29) | 1.72 m | 51 | 96 | (Poland) MKS Lublin |
| 65 | RW | Anne Erauskin | 7 November 1998 (aged 28) | 1.71 m | 29 | 59 | (Spain) BM Bera Bera |
| 68 | P | Lyndie Tchaptchet | 13 January 2005 (aged 21) | 1.85 m | 30 | 58 | (France) Metz Handball |
| 70 | LB | Carmen Arroyo | 3 March 2004 (aged 22) | 1.80 m | 24 | 25 | (Spain) BM Bera Bera |
| 76 | LW | Lisa Oppedal | 20 December 2003 (aged 22) | 1.78 m | 20 | 30 | (Spain) CB Elche |
| 78 | LB | Belén Rodríguez Lario | 2 August 2006 (aged 20) | 1.73 m | 6 | 10 | (Spain) CB Elche |
| 82 | LB | Adrianna Mallo | 24 August 2002 (aged 24) | 1.74 m | 4 | 2 | (Spain) BM Porriño |
| 93 | GK | Nicole Morales | 5 August 1998 (aged 28) | 1.72 m | 23 | 1 | (Spain) CB Elche |

=== Turkey ===
A 22-player squad announced on 10 November 2026.

Head coach: David Ginesta Montes

| No. | Pos. | Name | Date of birth (age) | Height | App. | Goals | Club |
|---|---|---|---|---|---|---|---|
| 1 | GK | Selen Akalın | 25 August 1998 (aged 28) | 1.71 m | 1 | 0 | (Turkey) Üsküdar Belediyespor |
| 7 | RB | Edanur Burhan | 11 October 1999 (aged 27) | 1.70 m | 7 | 3 | (Turkey) Yalıkavak SK |
| 8 | P | Cansu Akalın | 25 August 1998 (aged 28) | 1.85 m | 10 | 5 | (Turkey) Bursa BBSK |
| 10 | CB | Gülcan Tügel | 10 July 2000 (aged 26) | 1.73 m | 18 | 43 | (Turkey) Yalıkavak SK |
| 11 | RB | Döne Gül Bozdoğan | 3 February 1999 (aged 27) | 1.72 m | 30 | 43 | (Turkey) MC Sistem Yozgat GSK |
| 13 | RW | Bilgenur Öztürk | 16 June 1999 (aged 27) | 1.71 m | 4 | 24 | (Turkey) Üsküdar Belediyespor |
| 14 | P | Nurceren Akgün Göktepe | 20 June 1992 (aged 34) | 1.80 m | 72 | 127 | (Turkey) MC Sistem Yozgat GSK |
| 16 | LB | Buğu Sönmez | 1 January 2006 (aged 20) | 1.82 m | 8 | 16 | (Turkey) Manisa Büyükşehir Belediyespor |
| 17 | LW | Ceylan Aydemir | 15 August 1998 (aged 28) | 1.71 m | 14 | 20 | (Turkey) Yalıkavak SK |
| 18 | GK | Yağmur Bembeyaz | 25 June 1999 (aged 27) | 1.83 m | 9 | 0 | (Turkey) Bursa BBSK |
| 19 | CB | Yağmur Özler | 17 September 2001 (aged 25) | 1.76 m | 7 | 14 | (Turkey) Üsküdar Belediyespor |
| 22 | RW | Emine Gökdemir | 1 February 2003 (aged 23) | 1.63 m | 18 | 27 | (Turkey) Bursa BBSK |
| 23 | LW | Berinda Tükenmez | 23 November 2002 (aged 24) | 1.70 m | 0 | 0 | (Denmark) Rødovre HK |
| 25 | P | Hatice Özdemir | 26 June 2000 (aged 26) | 1.78 m | 2 | 0 | (Turkey) Odunpazarı S.K. |
| 26 | LW | Beyzanur Türkyılmaz | 29 August 2001 (aged 25) | 1.67 m | 6 | 12 | (Turkey) Bursa BBSK |
| 28 | GK | Yaren Göker | 5 November 1999 (aged 27) | 1.75 m | 2 | 0 | (Turkey) Göztepe S.K. |
| 35 | LB | Sude Dağ | 30 May 2004 (aged 22) | 1.80 m | 4 | 5 | (Turkey) Göztepe S.K. |
| 38 | RB | Azra Öztürk | 16 March 2007 (aged 19) | 1.82 m | 0 | 0 | (Turkey) Üsküdar Belediyespor |
| 41 | RB | Gazel Dikme | 9 December 2009 (aged 16) | 1.75 m | 0 | 0 | (Turkey) Manisa Büyükşehir Belediyespor |
| 47 | P | Büşra Işıkhan | 1 January 1999 (aged 27) | 1.76 m | 8 | 2 | (Turkey) Manisa Büyükşehir Belediyespor |
| 53 | LB | Ayşenur Sormaz | 10 May 2000 (aged 26) | 1.78 m | 0 | 0 | (Turkey) Bursa BBSK |
| 71 | LB | Hande Muhcu | 4 August 2006 (aged 20) | 1.85 m | 0 | 0 | (Turkey) Odunpazarı S.K. |

== Group D ==
=== Austria ===
The squad was announced on 10 November 2026.

Head coach: (Netherlands) Monique Tijsterman

| No. | Pos. | Name | Date of birth (age) | Height | App. | Goals | Club |
|---|---|---|---|---|---|---|---|
| 1 | GK | Lena Ivančok | 29 March 2001 (aged 25) | 1.75 m | 73 | 3 | (France) JDA Dijon Handball |
| 3 | LB | Katarina Pandza | 17 April 2002 (aged 24) | 1.76 m | 63 | 262 | (Croatia) RK Podravka Koprivnica |
| 8 | LW | Leonie Neunteufel | 4 January 2006 (aged 20) | 1.68 m | 3 | 1 | (Austria) MGA Fivers |
| 10 | RW | Lorena Baljak | 24 October 2006 (aged 20) | 1.62 m | 17 | 16 | (Switzerland) LC Brühl Handball |
| 13 | LB | Martina Matičević | 12 November 2006 (aged 20) | 1.80 m | 11 | 15 | (Austria) Hypo Niederösterreich |
| 18 | RB | Kristina Dramac | 9 January 2002 (aged 24) | 1.80 m | 63 | 93 | (Germany) BSV Sachsen Zwickau |
| 29 | LB | Ines Ivančok-Šoltić | 14 April 1998 (aged 28) | 1.80 m | 98 | 366 | (Hungary) Debreceni VSC |
| 33 | GK | Denise Kaufmann | 31 October 2002 (aged 24) | 1.75 m | 6 | 0 | (Germany) BSV Sachsen Zwickau |
| 44 | P | Nora Leitner | 5 May 2002 (aged 24) | 1.77 m | 50 | 55 | (Portugal) Benfica |
| 46 | P | Rebecca Rappitsch | 26 February 2006 (aged 20) | 1.71 m | 3 | 1 | (Germany) SV Grün-Weiß Schwerin |
| 54 | LW | Santina Sabatnig | 4 January 2004 (aged 22) | 1.74 m | 55 | 59 | (Germany) TuS Metzingen |
| 64 | CB | Ana Pandza | 24 December 2003 (aged 22) | 1.71 m | 55 | 74 | (Croatia) RK Podravka Koprivnica |
| 67 | LB | Johanna Reichert | 31 December 2001 (aged 24) | 1.78 m | 60 | 170 | (Romania) CS Gloria Bistrița |
| 81 | CB | Viktoria Marksteiner | 5 November 2005 (aged 21) | 1.70 m | 15 | 14 | (Germany) SV Union Halle-Neustadt |
| 89 | LW | Eleonora Stankovic | 27 October 2002 (aged 24) | 1.70 m | 28 | 77 | (Slovenia) RK Krim |
| 97 | RW | Philomena Egger | 1 May 2007 (aged 19) | 1.77 m | 23 | 70 | (Slovenia) RK Krim |

=== Croatia ===
A 20-player squad announced on 10 November 2026.

Head coach: Ivica Obrvan

| No. | Pos. | Name | Date of birth (age) | Height | App. | Goals | Club |
|---|---|---|---|---|---|---|---|
| 1 | GK | Lucija Bešen | 29 March 1998 (aged 28) | 1.82 m | 83 | 2 | (Croatia) RK Podravka Koprivnica |
| 4 | LB | Tina Barišić | 30 October 2000 (aged 26) | 1.85 m | 46 | 156 | (Croatia) RK Podravka Koprivnica |
| 5 | CB | Iva Zrilić | 13 October 2004 (aged 22) | 1.66 m | 24 | 14 | (Croatia) RK Lokomotiva Zagreb |
| 6 | P | Sara Šenvald | 14 March 1996 (aged 30) | 1.83 m | 61 | 71 | (Croatia) RK Podravka Koprivnica |
| 7 | RB | Klara Birtić | 28 March 2002 (aged 24) | 1.79 m | 32 | 85 | (Croatia) RK Podravka Koprivnica |
| 8 | RW | Kala Kosovac | 29 May 2005 (aged 21) | 1.68 m | 8 | 14 | (Croatia) RK Podravka Koprivnica |
| 10 | CB | Dejana Milosavljević | 23 November 1994 (aged 32) | 1.72 m | 72 | 207 | (Croatia) RK Podravka Koprivnica |
| 12 | GK | Ivana Kapitanović | 17 September 1994 (aged 32) | 1.84 m | 75 | 6 | (Romania) CS Minaur Baia Mare |
| 13 | LW | Paula Posavec | 26 August 1996 (aged 30) | 1.70 m | 97 | 131 | (Croatia) RK Lokomotiva Zagreb |
| 17 | P | Katarina Ježić | 19 December 1992 (aged 33) | 1.73 m | 130 | 285 | (Romania) HC Dunărea Brăila |
| 18 | CB | Stela Posavec | 26 August 1996 (aged 30) | 1.65 m | 83 | 134 | (Croatia) RK Lokomotiva Zagreb |
| 25 | RW | Lana Strugar | 27 November 2004 (aged 22) | 1.68 m | 4 | 4 | (Croatia) RK Lokomotiva Zagreb |
| 26 | P | Mia Brkić | 11 May 2003 (aged 23) | 1.83 m | 31 | 25 | (Croatia) RK Podravka Koprivnica |
| 28 | LW | Andrea Šimara | 13 July 1997 (aged 29) | 1.71 m | 75 | 139 | (Croatia) RK Podravka Koprivnica |
| 34 | CB | Ivana Fratnik | 26 October 2006 (aged 20) | 1.80 m | 3 | 7 | (Croatia) RK Podravka Koprivnica |
| 45 | CB | Iva Bule | 14 November 2004 (aged 22) | 1.74 m | 35 | 50 | (Croatia) RK Lokomotiva Zagreb |
| 48 | RB | Hannah Vuljak | 18 August 2002 (aged 24) | 1.82 m | 21 | 20 | (Montenegro) ŽRK Budućnost Podgorica |
| 50 | GK | Petra Marinović | 29 June 2001 (aged 25) | 1.80 m | 12 | 0 | (Croatia) RK Podravka Koprivnica |
| 63 | LB | Sara Sablić | 12 March 2000 (aged 26) | 1.91 m | 5 | 3 | (Romania) CS Minaur Baia Mare |
| 88 | LB | Kristina Prkačin | 21 October 1997 (aged 29) | 1.83 m | 68 | 68 | (Croatia) RK Lokomotiva Zagreb |

=== Czech Republic ===
A 20-player squad announced on 19 November 2026.

=== Netherlands ===
The squad was announced on 29 October 2026.

Head coach: (Sweden) Henrik Signell

| No. | Pos. | Name | Date of birth (age) | Height | App. | Goals | Club |
|---|---|---|---|---|---|---|---|
| 4 | RB | Alieke van Maurik | 11 May 2005 (aged 21) | 1.81 m | 35 | 50 | (Germany) Borussia Dortmund |
| 10 | LB | Isa Ternede | 26 January 2001 (aged 25) | 1.68 m | 17 | 25 | (Germany) Buxtehuder SV |
| 12 | LW | Bo van Wetering | 5 October 1999 (aged 27) | 1.72 m | 128 | 437 | (Hungary) Győri ETO KC |
| 17 | LB | Kim Molenaar | 28 April 2002 (aged 24) | 1.78 m | 49 | 43 | (Sweden) IK Sävehof |
| 18 | LB | Kelly Dulfer | 21 March 1994 (aged 32) | 1.85 m | 216 | 357 | (Hungary) Győri ETO KC |
| 19 | P | Merel Freriks | 6 January 1998 (aged 28) | 1.75 m | 117 | 217 | (Germany) Borussia Dortmund |
| 20 | CB | Inger Smits | 17 September 1994 (aged 32) | 1.79 m | 116 | 204 | (Romania) SCM Râmnicu Vâlcea |
| 22 | LW | Zoë Sprengers | 19 January 2000 (aged 26) | 1.66 m | 84 | 184 | (Romania) SCM Râmnicu Vâlcea |
| 24 | P | Romée Maarschalkerweerd | 24 September 2004 (aged 22) | 1.78 m | 37 | 79 | (Denmark) Odense Håndbold |
| 26 | RW | Angela Malestein | 31 January 1993 (aged 33) | 1.70 m | 248 | 887 | (Hungary) Ferencvárosi TC |
| 30 | GK | Rinka Duijndam | 6 August 1997 (aged 29) | 1.78 m | 122 | 5 | (France) Chambray Touraine Handball |
| 31 | RW | Kelly Vollebregt | 1 January 1995 (aged 31) | 1.67 m | 65 | 133 | (Germany) Borussia Dortmund |
| 35 | CB | Ivana Kwakman | 16 August 2009 (aged 17) | 1.78 m | 1 | 4 | (Netherlands) VOC Amsterdam |
| 38 | GK | Yara ten Holte | 23 November 1999 (aged 27) | 1.75 m | 93 | 4 | (Denmark) Odense Håndbold |
| 44 | P | Nikita van der Vliet | 14 March 2000 (aged 26) | 1.71 m | 75 | 143 | (Denmark) Odense Håndbold |
| 48 | RB | Dione Housheer | 26 September 1999 (aged 27) | 1.80 m | 128 | 456 | (Hungary) Győri ETO KC |

== Group E ==
=== Faroe Islands ===
The squad was announced on 9 November 2026.

Head coach: (Denmark) Claus Mogensen

| No. | Pos. | Name | Date of birth (age) | Height | App. | Goals | Club |
|---|---|---|---|---|---|---|---|
| 1 | GK | Annika Fríðheim Petersen | 1 June 1999 (aged 27) | 1.79 m | 44 | 1 | (Poland) Enea MKS Gniezno |
| 4 | RW | Brynhild Pálsdóttir | 5 March 2003 (aged 23) | 1.75 m | 19 | 26 | (Denmark) BK Ydun |
| 5 | P | Var Bentsdóttir Zachariasen | 11 April 2002 (aged 24) | 1.80 m | 24 | 5 | (Denmark) Ajax København |
| 6 | LB | Marita Mortensen | 29 March 2001 (aged 25) | 1.80 m | 35 | 32 | (Denmark) Nykøbing Falster |
| 7 | RW | Joan Rúnadóttir Johannesen | 3 June 2006 (aged 20) | 1.65 m | 2 | 3 | (Iceland) KA Akureyri |
| 8 | LW | Rannvá Olsen | 22 January 2003 (aged 23) | 1.70 m | 35 | 67 | (Denmark) Ejstrup/Hærvejen |
| 14 | P | Agatha Kjærbæk Djurhuus | 11 December 2006 (aged 19) | 1.75 m | 2 | 0 | (Iceland) KA Akureyri |
| 17 | LB | Lív Bentsdóttir Zachariasen | 11 April 2002 (aged 24) | 1.79 m | 29 | 13 | (Denmark) Ajax København |
| 18 | P | Pernille Brandenborg (c) | 29 June 1997 (aged 29) | 1.82 m | 63 | 175 | (Romania) CSM București |
| 21 | CB | Maria Pálsdóttir Nólsoy | 19 August 2004 (aged 22) | 1.77 m | 35 | 99 | (Denmark) København Håndbold |
| 22 | CB | Ró Reginsdóttir | 25 December 2007 (aged 18) | 1.60 m | 2 | 0 | (Faroe Islands) Neistin |
| 25 | LW | Christina Turiðardóttir Arge | 4 September 2001 (aged 25) | 1.78 m | 2 | 5 | (Denmark) Hadsten Håndbold |
| 44 | LW | Anna Elisabeth Halsdóttir Weyhe | 30 October 2005 (aged 21) | 1.69 m | 25 | 57 | (Faroe Islands) H71 |
| 77 | CB | Jana Mittún | 24 November 2003 (aged 23) | 1.76 m | 42 | 199 | (Denmark) Viborg HK |
| 88 | GK | Rakul Wardum | 12 June 2002 (aged 24) | 1.78 m | 42 | 2 | (Denmark) Skanderborg Håndbold |
| 99 | LB | Friða Nolsøe Olsen | 11 August 2003 (aged 23) | 1.70 m | 6 | 5 | (Denmark) BK Ydun |

=== France ===
A 20-player squad announced on 6 November 2026.

Head coach: Sébastien Gardillou

| No. | Pos. | Name | Date of birth (age) | Height | App. | Goals | Club |
|---|---|---|---|---|---|---|---|
| 1 | GK | Laura Glauser | 20 August 1993 (aged 33) | 1.78 m | 151 | 3 | (Romania) CS Rapid București |
| 2 | CB | Méline Nocandy | 25 February 1998 (aged 28) | 1.75 m | 96 | 183 | (France) Brest Bretagne Handball |
| 3 | RW | Alicia Toublanc-Nicolas | 3 May 1996 (aged 30) | 1.69 m | 85 | 234 | (Hungary) Debreceni VSC |
| 5 | LB | Clarisse Mairot | 27 January 2001 (aged 25) | 1.70 m | 28 | 47 | (France) Brest Bretagne Handball |
| 6 | LW | Chloé Valentini | 19 April 1995 (aged 31) | 1.65 m | 113 | 338 | (France) Metz Handball |
| 7 | P | Sarah Bouktit | 27 August 2002 (aged 24) | 1.83 m | 63 | 164 | (Hungary) Győri ETO KC |
| 10 | CB | Grâce Zaadi | 7 July 1993 (aged 33) | 1.71 m | 210 | 419 | (Romania) SCM Râmnicu Vâlcea |
| 14 | LW | Nina Dury | 16 January 2004 (aged 22) | 1.74 m | 22 | 52 | (France) JDA Dijon Handball |
| 18 | P | Lilou Pintat | 9 November 2004 (aged 22) | 1.79 m | 13 | 9 | (France) Metz Handball |
| 20 | RB | Laura Schneider | 13 December 1994 (aged 31) | 1.71 m | 158 | 306 | (France) Metz Handball |
| 22 | CB | Tamara Horacek | 5 November 1995 (aged 31) | 1.78 m | 130 | 275 | (France) Brest Bretagne Handball |
| 23 | LB | Déborah Lassource | 29 September 1999 (aged 27) | 1.72 m | 46 | 41 | (France) JDA Dijon Handball |
| 27 | LB | Estelle Nze Minko | 11 August 1991 (aged 35) | 1.78 m | 208 | 513 | (Hungary) Győri ETO KC |
| 28 | RW | Lucie Granier | 11 June 1999 (aged 27) | 1.67 m | 85 | 205 | (France) Metz Handball |
| 29 | P | Oriane Ondono | 14 April 1996 (aged 30) | 1.80 m | 65 | 87 | (France) Brest Bretagne Handball |
| 34 | CB | Léna Grandveau | 21 January 2003 (aged 23) | 1.70 m | 66 | 141 | (France) Metz Handball |
| 43 | LB | Prunelle Kingue | 19 March 2006 (aged 20) | 1.79 m | 0 | 0 | (France) ESBF Besançon |
| 53 | GK | Léa Fargues | 7 June 1998 (aged 28) | 1.75 m | 3 | 0 | (France) SATH |
| 89 | RW | Manon Errard | 9 February 2005 (aged 21) | 1.78 m | 5 | 18 | (France) Metz Handball |
| 99 | GK | Hatadou Sako | 21 October 1995 (aged 31) | 1.74 m | 56 | 0 | (Hungary) Győri ETO KC |

=== Poland ===
The squad was announced on 10 November 2026.

Head coach: (Norway) Arne Senstad

| No. | Pos. | Name | Date of birth (age) | Height | App. | Goals | Club |
|---|---|---|---|---|---|---|---|
| 4 | P | Aleksandra Olek | 31 October 2000 (aged 26) | 1.78 m | 42 | 57 | (Poland) MKS Piotrcovia |
| 5 | LW | Joanna Gadzina | 1 September 1992 (aged 34) | 1.64 m | 19 | 21 | (Poland) MKS Piotrcovia |
| 6 | P | Patrycja Noga | 13 April 1994 (aged 32) | 1.78 m | 11 | 15 | (Poland) MKS Piotrcovia |
| 8 | RB | Monika Kobylińska | 9 April 1995 (aged 31) | 1.77 m | 143 | 511 | (Hungary) Debreceni VSC |
| 16 | GK | Adrianna Płaczek | 10 December 1993 (aged 32) | 1.74 m | 129 | 1 | (Hungary) Debreceni VSC |
| 22 | LB | Aleksandra Rosiak | 7 July 1997 (aged 29) | 1.82 m | 97 | 223 | (Poland) MKS Lublin |
| 26 | GK | Paulina Wdowiak | 12 January 2000 (aged 26) | 1.74 m | 32 | 0 | (Poland) MKS Lublin |
| 27 | CB | Magdalena Drażyk | 23 February 1997 (aged 29) | 1.69 m | 19 | 17 | (Poland) KPR Kobierzyce |
| 29 | LB | Katarzyna Cygan | 9 March 2000 (aged 26) | 1.84 m | 20 | 48 | (Poland) MKS Urbis Gniezno |
| 31 | RW | Magda Balsam | 20 September 1996 (aged 30) | 1.72 m | 81 | 303 | (Romania) CSM Corona Brașov |
| 36 | P | Natalia Pankowska | 11 March 2002 (aged 24) | 1.79 m | 17 | 20 | (Poland) MKS Lublin |
| 40 | LW | Daria Michalak | 12 December 1995 (aged 30) | 1.71 m | 85 | 171 | (France) Brest Bretagne Handball |
| 44 | LB | Zuzanna Zimnicka | 18 November 2006 (aged 20) | 1.74 m | 2 | 0 | (Poland) KPR Kobierzyce |
| 49 | CB | Karolina Kochaniak | 5 July 1995 (aged 31) | 1.75 m | 67 | 154 | (Romania) CSM Corona Brașov |
| 71 | RW | Adrianna Górna | 22 March 1996 (aged 30) | 1.71 m | 74 | 82 | (Romania) CSM Slatina |
| 78 | LB | Paulina Uścinowicz | 16 October 1999 (aged 27) | 1.83 m | 50 | 79 | (Germany) Neckarsulmer SU |
| 97 | RB | Monika Łęgowska | 29 August 1997 (aged 29) | 1.78 m | 0 | 0 | (Poland) MKS Urbis Gniezno |

== Group F ==
=== Germany ===
The squad was announced on 29 October 2026.

Head coach: Markus Gaugisch

| No. | Pos. | Name | Date of birth (age) | Height | App. | Goals | Club |
|---|---|---|---|---|---|---|---|
| 4 | CB | Alina Grijseels | 12 April 1996 (aged 30) | 1.75 m | 128 | 425 | (Germany) Borussia Dortmund |
| 5 | RW | Farrelle Njinkeu | 9 January 2007 (aged 19) | 1.74 m | 2 | 3 | (Germany) HSG Blomberg-Lippe |
| 8 | RB | Nina Engel | 25 April 2003 (aged 23) | 1.76 m | 34 | 111 | (Romania) CS Gloria Bistrița |
| 9 | P | Lisa Antl | 21 June 2000 (aged 26) | 1.72 m | 89 | 146 | (Germany) Borussia Dortmund |
| 10 | CB | Mareike Thomaier | 25 August 2000 (aged 26) | 1.72 m | 55 | 61 | (Germany) Borussia Dortmund |
| 14 | P | Marie Steffen | 2 March 2001 (aged 25) | 1.83 m | 21 | 16 | (Romania) CS Rapid București |
| 18 | P | Ida Petzold | 8 December 2005 (aged 20) | 1.80 m | 1 | 2 | (Germany) TuS Metzingen |
| 19 | LB | Nieke Kühne | 9 September 2004 (aged 22) | 1.84 m | 27 | 60 | (Germany) HSG Blomberg-Lippe |
| 20 | LB | Emily Vogel | 26 April 1998 (aged 28) | 1.82 m | 152 | 467 | (Hungary) Ferencvárosi TC |
| 23 | LB | Annika Lott | 7 December 1999 (aged 26) | 1.80 m | 58 | 120 | (France) Brest Bretagne Handball |
| 24 | GK | Sarah Wachter | 16 December 1999 (aged 26) | 1.83 m | 63 | 2 | (Germany) Borussia Dortmund |
| 29 | LW | Antje Döll | 3 October 1988 (aged 38) | 1.70 m | 122 | 354 | (Germany) Sport-Union Neckarsulm |
| 30 | RW | Jenny Behrend | 20 January 1996 (aged 30) | 1.72 m | 102 | 206 | (Germany) VfL Oldenburg |
| 31 | LW | Alexia Hauf | 18 July 1998 (aged 28) | 1.62 m | 47 | 89 | (Germany) HSG Blomberg-Lippe |
| 42 | GK | Katharina Filter | 4 February 1999 (aged 27) | 1.80 m | 90 | 7 | (Denmark) Team Esbjerg |
| 77 | RB | Viola Leuchter | 15 June 2004 (aged 22) | 1.87 m | 55 | 148 | (Denmark) Odense Håndbold |

=== Serbia ===
The squad was announced on 11 November 2026.

Head coach: Sandra Kolaković

| No. | Pos. | Name | Date of birth (age) | Height | App. | Goals | Club |
|---|---|---|---|---|---|---|---|
| 2 | RW | Tijana Simić | 22 May 2003 (aged 23) | 1.75 m | 8 | 3 | (Serbia) ŽRK Crvena zvezda |
| 3 | LW | Aleksandra Stamenić | 12 July 1998 (aged 28) | 1.67 m | 37 | 66 | (Serbia) ŽRK Crvena zvezda |
| 4 | CB | Teodora Majkić | 6 October 2000 (aged 26) | 1.70 m | 16 | 6 | (Serbia) ŽRK Crvena zvezda |
| 8 | LW | Jelena Stojanović | 16 April 2003 (aged 23) | 1.72 m | 0 | 0 | (Serbia) ŽRK Naisa |
| 10 | LB | Aleksandra Vasić | 5 January 2005 (aged 21) | 1.79 m | 9 | 15 | (Serbia) ŽORK Bor |
| 11 | CB | Nora Fajfrić | 18 March 2004 (aged 22) | 1.76 m | 4 | 2 | (Serbia) ŽRK Naisa |
| 12 | GK | Molli Kubina | 14 May 2002 (aged 24) | 1.78 m | 16 | 0 | (Serbia) ŽRK Crvena zvezda |
| 19 | CB | Leana Milosavljević | 19 June 2007 (aged 19) | 1.75 m | 3 | 8 | (France) Stella Saint-Maur Handball |
| 21 | P | Sanja Stamenković | 19 August 2001 (aged 25) | 1.72 m | 0 | 0 | (Serbia) GZRK Napredak-12 |
| 23 | P | Katarina Bojičić | 13 March 1998 (aged 28) | 1.79 m | 42 | 49 | (Serbia) ŽRK Crvena zvezda |
| 24 | LB | Jovana Skrobić | 9 April 1996 (aged 30) | 1.82 m | 45 | 136 | (Montenegro) ŽRK Budućnost Podgorica |
| 27 | GK | Gordana Petković | 24 March 1991 (aged 35) | 1.77 m | 13 | 1 | (Serbia) ŽORK Bor |
| 34 | RW | Dunja Radević | 25 November 2005 (aged 21) | 1.69 m | 43 | 76 | (Montenegro) ŽRK Budućnost Podgorica |
| 36 | GK | Marija Simić | 21 February 2000 (aged 26) | 1.77 m | 18 | 0 | (Poland) KPR Kobierzyce |
| 37 | RB | Lara Stanić | 23 March 2006 (aged 20) | 1.66 m | 2 | 0 | (Serbia) ŽRK Crvena zvezda |
| 44 | CB | Tamara Mandić | 2 August 2005 (aged 21) | 1.75 m | 10 | 6 | (Serbia) ŽRK Naisa |
| 66 | LB | Jelena Knežević | 25 January 1998 (aged 28) | 1.4 m | 9 | 12 | (Switzerland) LC Brühl Handball |
| 74 | P | Katarina Mančić | 19 June 1997 (aged 29) | 1.81 m | 3 | 2 | (Serbia) ŽORK Bor |
| 77 | CB | Aleksandra Vukajlović | 7 June 1997 (aged 29) | 1.71 m | 56 | 93 | (Serbia) ŽRK Crvena zvezda |

=== Slovakia ===
The squad was announced on 17 November 2026.

Head coach: Ján Beňadik

| No. | Pos. | Name | Date of birth (age) | Height | App. | Goals | Club |
|---|---|---|---|---|---|---|---|
| 5 | RW | Lujza Rozi Bölcskei | 17 July 2008 (aged 18) | 1.70 m | 0 | 0 | (Slovakia) HC Tatran Stupava |
| 7 | RW | Nataliia Dmytrenko | 5 October 2003 (aged 23) | 1.64 m | 25 | 18 | (Ukraine) HC Galychanka |
| 8 | CB | Diana Vargová | 8 June 2003 (aged 23) | 1.69 m | 23 | 39 | (Slovakia) HK Slovan Duslo Šaľa |
| 9 | LW | Olivia Šcípová | 12 September 2000 (aged 26) | 1.71 m | 50 | 115 | (Poland) Enea MKS Gnieznoa |
| 11 | LB | Olivia Šcípová | 21 August 2002 (aged 24) | 1.78 m | 43 | 51 | (Poland) Enea MKS Gnieznoa |
| 12 | GK | Soňa Furgaláková | 11 August 1999 (aged 27) | 1.73 m | 37 | 0 | (Slovakia) HK Slovan Duslo Šaľa |
| 14 | LB | Tatiana Šutranová | 26 August 1997 (aged 29) | 1.80 m | 19 | 42 | (Croatia) ŽRK Bjelovar |
| 18 | RW | Lenka Ratvajská | 18 September 2000 (aged 26) | 1.63 m | 35 | 42 | (Iceland) KA/Þór |
| 22 | LW | Emma Lukáčová | 31 August 2005 (aged 21) | 1.73 m | 2 | 1 | (Slovakia) IUVENTA Michalovce |
| 24 | P | Kristína Pastorková | 16 September 1997 (aged 29) | 1.74 m | 51 | 40 | (Slovakia) HC DAC Dunajská Streda |
| 28 | RB | Barbora Lancz | 28 July 2002 (aged 24) | 1.71 m | 60 | 311 | (Hungary) MTK Budapest |
| 29 | P | Viktoria Györiova | 13 May 2003 (aged 23) | 1.74 m | 42 | 36 | (Hungary) Kisvárdai KC |
| 33 | LB | Anette Emma Hudáková | 25 March 1998 (aged 28) | 1.78 m | 32 | 5 | (Hungary) Moyra-Budaörs Handball |
| 38 | CB | Dorota Bacenkova | 25 June 2004 (aged 22) | 1.70 m | 22 | 31 | (Hungary) Kisvárdai KC |
| 44 | LW | Karin Bujnohova | 11 July 2002 (aged 24) | 1.68 m | 12 | 12 | (Hungary) Szombathelyi KKA |
| 61 | GK | Iryna Yablonska-Bobal | 3 December 1991 (aged 35) | 1.75 m | 19 | 1 | (Slovakia) IUVENTA Michalovce |
| 68 | RB | Liliana Gogová | 29 September 2008 (aged 18) | 1.76 m | 2 | 1 | (Slovakia) ŠKP Topoľčany |
| 77 | GK | Barbora Jakubíková | 29 March 2004 (aged 22) | 1.83 m | 2 | 0 | (Slovakia) IUVENTA Michalovce |
| 98 | P | Anastasija Bjalončík | 21 April 2002 (aged 24) | 1.82 m | 1 | 2 | (Slovakia) HC DAC Dunajská Streda |
| 99 | CB | Barbora Sabovová | 6 May 2007 (aged 19) | 1.64 m | 4 | 6 | (Slovakia) IUVENTA Michalovce |

=== Sweden ===
The squad was announced on 2 November 2026.

Head coach: Tomas Axnér

| No. | Pos. | Name | Date of birth (age) | Height | App. | Goals | Club |
|---|---|---|---|---|---|---|---|
| 1 | GK | Johanna Bundsen | 3 June 1991 (aged 35) | 1.85 m | 184 | 18 | (Denmark) Odense Håndbold |
| 2 | LW | Clara Lerby | 8 May 1999 (aged 27) | 1.72 m | 42 | 174 | (Denmark) Nykøbing Falster |
| 3 | RB | Nina Koppang | 31 May 2002 (aged 24) | 1.77 m | 50 | 87 | (Sweden) IK Sävehof |
| 6 | LB | Hanna Lundvall | 28 June 2006 (aged 20) | 1.76 m | 3 | 1 | (Sweden) Skara HF |
| 10 | RW | Mathilda Lundström | 20 December 1996 (aged 29) | 1.64 m | 100 | 145 | (Sweden) Skara HF |
| 11 | LB | Tyra Axnér | 18 March 2002 (aged 24) | 1.78 m | 75 | 174 | (Romania) CSM București |
| 14 | P | Isabelle Rydén | 26 November 2006 (aged 20) | 1.78 m | 3 | 2 | (Denmark) Nykøbing Falster |
| 17 | RB | Nina Dano | 12 June 2000 (aged 26) | 1.72 m | 74 | 126 | (Denmark) HØJ Elite |
| 20 | GK | Stina Littorin | 23 March 2005 (aged 21) | 1.81 m | 5 | 0 | (Denmark) Nordvestjysk Elite |
| 21 | GK | Evelina Eriksson | 20 August 1996 (aged 30) | 1.84 m | 58 | 1 | (Romania) CS Gloria Bistrița |
| 23 | CB | Emma Lindqvist (c) | 17 September 1997 (aged 29) | 1.77 m | 129 | 299 | (Denmark) Ikast Håndbold |
| 38 | LW | Elin Hansson | 7 August 1996 (aged 30) | 1.73 m | 113 | 273 | (Denmark) Team Esbjerg |
| 42 | CB | Jenny Carlson | 17 April 1995 (aged 31) | 1.72 m | 97 | 251 | (Romania) CSM București |
| 43 | P | Emma Olsson | 20 August 1997 (aged 29) | 1.79 m | 4 | 10 | (Germany) Borussia Dortmund |
| 49 | P | Olivia Löfqvist | 13 July 1998 (aged 28) | 1.77 m | 51 | 58 | (Denmark) Team Esbjerg |
| 52 | LB | Charité Mumbongo | 14 March 2002 (aged 24) | 1.79 m | 13 | 11 | (France) ESBF Besançon |
| 55 | RW | Clara Petersson Bergsten | 28 May 2002 (aged 24) | 1.62 m | 22 | 36 | (Norway) Molde Elite |
| 77 | CB | Emma Wahlström | 8 May 2000 (aged 26) | 1.70 m | 3 | 5 | (Denmark) Nordvestjysk Elite |
