= Barbara Zima =

Polish handball player (born 2000)

Personal information
- Nationality: Polish
- Born: 14 January 2000 (age 26) Ruda Śląska, Poland
- Height: 1.89 m (6 ft 2 in)

Sport
- Sport: Handball
- Position: Goalkeeper
- Current club: Zagłębie Lubin
- Number: 21

Senior clubs
- Years: Team
- 2021–2022: KPR Kobierzyce
- 2022–: Zagłębie Lubin
National team
Years	Team	Apps	(Gls)
2021–	Poland	41	(8)
- Updated on 3 November 2024

Barbara Zima (born 14 January 2000) is a Polish handballer for Zagłębie Lubin and the Polish national team.

She participated at the 2021 World Women's Handball Championship in Spain, placing 15th.
