= Aleksandra Tomczyk =

Polish handball player (born 1994)

Personal information
- Nationality: Polish
- Born: 19 October 1994 (age 32) Lublin, Poland
- Height: 1.80 m (5 ft 11 in)

Sport
- Sport: Handball
- Position: Centre back
- Current club: MKS Lublin
- Number: 9

Senior clubs
- Years: Team
- 2012–2013: SPR Sośnica Gliwice
- 2013–2019: KPR Jelenia Góra
- 2019–2023: KPR Kobierzyce
- 2023–: MKS Lublin
National team
Years	Team	Apps	(Gls)
–	Poland	26	(27)

Aleksandra Tomczyk (born 19 October 1994) is a Polish handballer for MKS Lublin and the Polish national team.

She participated at the 2024 European Women's Handball Championship in Hungary, Switzerland and Austria.
