= Poland women's national handball team =

Poland

Information
- Nickname: Biało-Czerwone (White and Reds)
- Association: Polish Handball Association (Związek Piłki Ręcznej w Polsce)
- Coach: Arne Senstad
- Assistant coach: Adrian Struzik
- Captain: Monika Kobylińska
- Most caps: Kinga Grzyb (266)
- Most goals: Karolina Kudłacz-Gloc (962)

Colours
1st	2nd

Results

World Championship
- Appearances: 19 (First in 1957)
- Best result: 4th (2013, 2015)

European Championship
- Appearances: 8 (First in 1996)
- Best result: 5th (1998)
- Last updated on Unknown.

The Poland women's national handball team is controlled by the Polish Handball Association (Związek Piłki Ręcznej w Polsce), and represents Poland in international matches.

== Results ==
=== World Championship ===
Year	Round	Position	GP	W	D*	L	GS	GA
(Socialist Federal Republic of Yugoslavia) 1957	Seventh place game	7th	4	2	0	2	14	19
(Romania) 1962	Seventh place game	7th	4	2	0	2	27	28
(West Germany) 1965	Seventh place game	8th	4	0	1	3	21	40
(Netherlands) 1971	did not qualify							
(Socialist Federal Republic of Yugoslavia) 1973	Placement round	5th	4	3	0	2	59	56
(Soviet Union) 1975	Placement round	7th	5	3	0	2	65	65
(Czechoslovakia) 1978	Final round	6th	8	2	0	6	108	55
(Hungary) 1982	did not qualify							
(Netherlands) 1986	Preliminary round	13th	3	0	0	3	45	67
(South Korea) 1990	Preliminary round	9th	5	2	0	3	117	103
(Norway) 1993	Main round	10th	8	2	2	4	178	203
(Austria) / (Hungary) 1995	Fifth place game	did not qualify						
(Germany) 1997	Quarter-finals	8th	7	5	0	2	178	158
(Denmark) / (Norway) 1999	Round of 16	11th	6	3	1	3	147	142
(Italy) 2001	did not qualify							
(Croatia) 2003	did not qualify							
(Russia) 2005	Preliminary round	19th	5	1	0	4	136	154
(France) 2007	Eleventh place game	11th	7	3	0	4	279	289
(China) 2009	did not qualify							
(Brazil) 2011	did not qualify							
(Serbia) 2013	Third place game	4th	9	5	0	4	238	193
(Denmark) 2015	Third place game	4th	9	5	0	4	227	239
(Germany) 2017	Seventh place march	17th	7	4	0	3	207	205
(Japan) 2019	did not qualify							
(Spain) 2021	Main round	15th	6	3	0	3	197	201
(Denmark) / (Norway) / (Sweden) 2023	Main round	16th	6	3	0	3	203	216
(Germany) / (Netherlands) 2025	Main round	11th	6	4	0	2	178	176
(Hungary) 2027	TBD							
(Spain) 2029	TBD							
(Czech Republic) / (Poland) 2031	Qualified as co-host							
Total	20/30	4th place	115	52	4	59	2624	2609

=== European Championship ===
Year	Round	Position	Pld	W	D	L	GS	GA
(Germany) 1994	Did not qualify							
(Denmark) 1996	Eleventh place game	11th	6	1	0	5	137	159
(Netherlands) 1998	Fifth place game	5th	6	4	0	2	138	133
(Romania) 2000	Did not qualify							
(Denmark) 2002	Did not qualify							
(Hungary) 2004	Did not qualify							
(Sweden) 2006	Main round	8th	6	3	0	3	164	186
(North Macedonia) 2008	Did not qualify							
(Denmark) / (Norway) 2010	Did not qualify							
(Serbia) 2012	Did not qualify							
(Croatia) / (Hungary) 2014	Main round	11th	6	1	0	5	136	162
(Sweden) 2016	Preliminary round	15th	3	0	0	3	65	84
(France) 2018	Preliminary round	14th	3	0	0	3	69	84
(Denmark) / (Norway) 2020	Preliminary round	14th	3	0	1	2	67	84
(Slovenia) (North Macedonia) (Montenegro) 2022	Preliminary round	13th	3	1	0	2	68	72
(Austria) (Hungary) (Switzerland) 2024	Main round	9th	7	3	0	4	173	197
(Czech Republic) (Poland) (Romania) (Slovakia) (Turkey) 2026	Qualified as co-host							
(Denmark) (Norway) (Sweden) 2028	TBD							
(Belgium) (France) 2030	TBD							
(Denmark) (Germany) (Poland) 2032	Qualified as co-host							
Total	11/18	5th place	43	13	1	29	1017	1161

** Red border colour indicates that tournament was held on home soil.

==== Record against other teams at the European Championship ====
National Team	Pld	W	D	L	PF	PA	+/-
Austria	2	1	0	1	55	53	+2
Croatia	1	0	0	1	21	25	−4
Denmark	4	0	0	4	83	118	−35
France	2	0	0	2	44	66	−22
Germany	5	1	1	3	112	122	−10
Hungary	4	0	0	4	84	118	−34
Lithuania	1	1	0	0	30	27	+3
Montenegro	2	0	0	2	51	56	−5
Netherlands	1	0	0	1	21	30	−9
Norway	4	0	0	4	86	123	−37
North Macedonia	2	2	0	0	62	48	+14
Portugal	1	1	0	0	22	21	+1
Romania	3	1	0	2	72	76	−4
Russia	2	2	0	0	54	47	+7
Serbia	1	0	0	1	26	33	−7
Slovenia	1	1	0	0	34	30	+4
Spain	4	3	0	1	90	88	+2
Sweden	3	0	0	3	70	80	−10
Total	43	13	1	29	1017	1161	−144

=== Performance in other tournaments ===
- Carpathian Trophy 1984 – Third place
- Carpathian Trophy 1985 – Second place
- Carpathian Trophy 1988 – Second place
- GF World Cup 2006 – Seventh place
- Carpathian Trophy 2010 – Second place
- Carpathian Trophy 2017 – Winner

== Team ==
=== Current squad ===
The squad for the 2026 European Women's Handball Championship.

Head coach: Arne Senstad

No.	Pos.	Name	Date of birth (age)	Height	App.	Goals	Club
4	P	Aleksandra Olek	31 October 2000 (age 26)	1.78 m	42	57	(Poland) MKS Piotrcovia
5	LW	Joanna Gadzina	1 September 1992 (age 34)	1.64 m	19	21	(Poland) MKS Piotrcovia
6	P	Patrycja Noga	13 April 1994 (age 32)	1.78 m	11	15	(Poland) MKS Piotrcovia
8	RB	Monika Kobylińska	9 April 1995 (age 31)	1.77 m	143	511	(Hungary) DVSC Skyline
16	GK	Adrianna Płaczek	10 December 1993 (age 32)	1.74 m	129	1	(Hungary) DVSC Skyline
22	LB	Aleksandra Rosiak	7 July 1997 (age 29)	1.82 m	97	223	(Poland) MKS Lublin
26	GK	Paulina Wdowiak	12 January 2000 (age 26)	1.74 m	32	0	(Poland) MKS Lublin
27	CB	Magdalena Drażyk	23 February 1997 (age 29)	1.69 m	19	17	(Poland) KPR Kobierzyce
29	LB	Katarzyna Cygan	9 March 2000 (age 26)	1.84 m	20	48	(Poland) MKS Urbis Gniezno
31	RW	Magda Balsam	20 September 1996 (age 30)	1.72 m	81	303	(Romania) CSM Corona Brașov
36	P	Natalia Pankowska	11 March 2002 (age 24)	1.79 m	17	20	(Poland) MKS Lublin
40	LW	Daria Michalak	12 December 1995 (age 30)	1.71 m	85	171	(France) Brest Bretagne Handball
44	LB	Zuzanna Zimnicka	18 November 2006 (age 19)	1.74 m	2	0	(Poland) KPR Kobierzyce
49	CB	Karolina Kochaniak	5 July 1995 (age 31)	1.75 m	67	154	(Romania) CSM Corona Brașov
71	RW	Adrianna Górna	22 March 1996 (age 30)	1.71 m	74	82	(Romania) CSM Slatina
78	LB	Paulina Uścinowicz	16 October 1999 (age 27)	1.83 m	50	79	(Germany) Neckarsulmer SU
97	RB	Monika Łęgowska	29 August 1997 (age 29)	1.78 m	0	0	(Poland) MKS Urbis Gniezno

=== Coaches ===
- Antoni Szymański (1951–1953)
- Tadeusz Breguła (1953–1956)
- Władysław Stawiarski (1956–1959)
- Edward Surdyka (1960–1965)
- Józef Zając (1966–1969)
- Paweł Wiśniowski (1969–1971)
- Leon Nosila (1971–1973)
- Zygmunt Jakubik (1973–1977)
- Mieczysław Kiegiel (1977–1979)
- Tadeusz Wadych (1980–1982)
- Bogdan Cybulski (1982–1986)
- Jerzy Noszczak (1987–1994)
- Jerzy Ciepliński (1994–2000)
- Marek Karpiński (2000–2003)
- Zygfryd Kuchta (2003–2006)
- Jerzy Ciepliński (2006)
- Zenon Łakomy (2006–2008)
- Krzysztof Przybylski (2008–2010)
- Kim Rasmussen (2010–2016)
- Leszek Krowicki (2016–2019)
- Arne Senstad (2019–)
