= Magdalena Drażyk =

Polish handball player (born 1994)

Personal information
- Nationality: Polish
- Born: 23 February 1997 (age 29) Świętochłowice, Poland
- Height: 1.80 m (5 ft 11 in)

Sport
- Sport: Handball
- Position: Centre back
- Current club: KPR Kobierzyce
- Number: 6

Senior clubs
- Years: Team
- 2014–2020: KPR Ruch Chorzów
- 2020–2023: Piotrcovia Piotrków Trybunalski
- 2023–: KPR Kobierzyce
National team
Years	Team	Apps	(Gls)
2024–	Poland	4	(9)

Magdalena Drażyk (born 23 February 1997) is a Polish handballer for KPR Kobierzyce and the Polish national team.

She participated at the 2024 European Women's Handball Championship in Hungary, Switzerland and Austria.
