= Joanna Gadzina =

Polish handball player (born 1992)

Personal information
- Nationality: Polish
- Born: 1 September 1992 (age 34) Nowy Sącz, Poland
- Height: 1.64 m (5 ft 5 in)

Sport
- Sport: Handball
- Position: Left wing
- Current club: Pogoń Szczecin
- Number: 92
National team
Years	Team	Apps	(Gls)
–	Poland	7	(10)

Joanna Gadzina (born 1 September 1992) is a Polish handball player. She plays for the club Pogoń Szczecin and is member of the Polish national team. She competed at the 2015 World Women's Handball Championship in Denmark.
