= Aleksandra Olek =

Polish handball player (born 2000)

Personal information
- Nationality: Polish
- Born: 31 October 2000 (age 25) Lublin, Poland
- Height: 1.80 m (5 ft 11 in)

Sport
- Sport: Handball
- Position: Line player
- Current club: MKS Lublin
- Number: 2

Senior clubs
- Years: Team
- 2019–2021: MKS Lublin
- 2021–2023: KPR Kobierzyce
- 2023–: MKS Lublin
National team
Years	Team	Apps	(Gls)
2022–	Poland	30	(42)
- Updated on 5 November 2025

Aleksandra Olek (born 31 October 2000) is a Polish handballer for MKS Lublin and the Polish national team.

She participated at the 2024 European Women's Handball Championship in Hungary, Switzerland and Austria.
