= Paulina Wdowiak =

Polish handball player (born 1994)

Personal information
- Nationality: Polish
- Born: 12 January 2000 (age 26) Radziejów, Poland
- Height: 1.80 m (5 ft 11 in)

Sport
- Sport: Handball
- Position: Goalkeeper
- Current club: MKS Lublin
- Number: 26

Senior clubs
- Years: Team
- 2023–: MKS Lublin
National team
Years	Team	Apps	(Gls)
2024–	Poland	19	(0)
- Updated on 5 November 2025

Paulina Wdowiak (born 12 January 2000) is a Polish handballer for MKS Lublin and the Polish national team.

She participated at the 2024 European Women's Handball Championship in Hungary, Switzerland and Austria.
