= Arne Senstad =

Norwegian handball player and coach (born 1969)

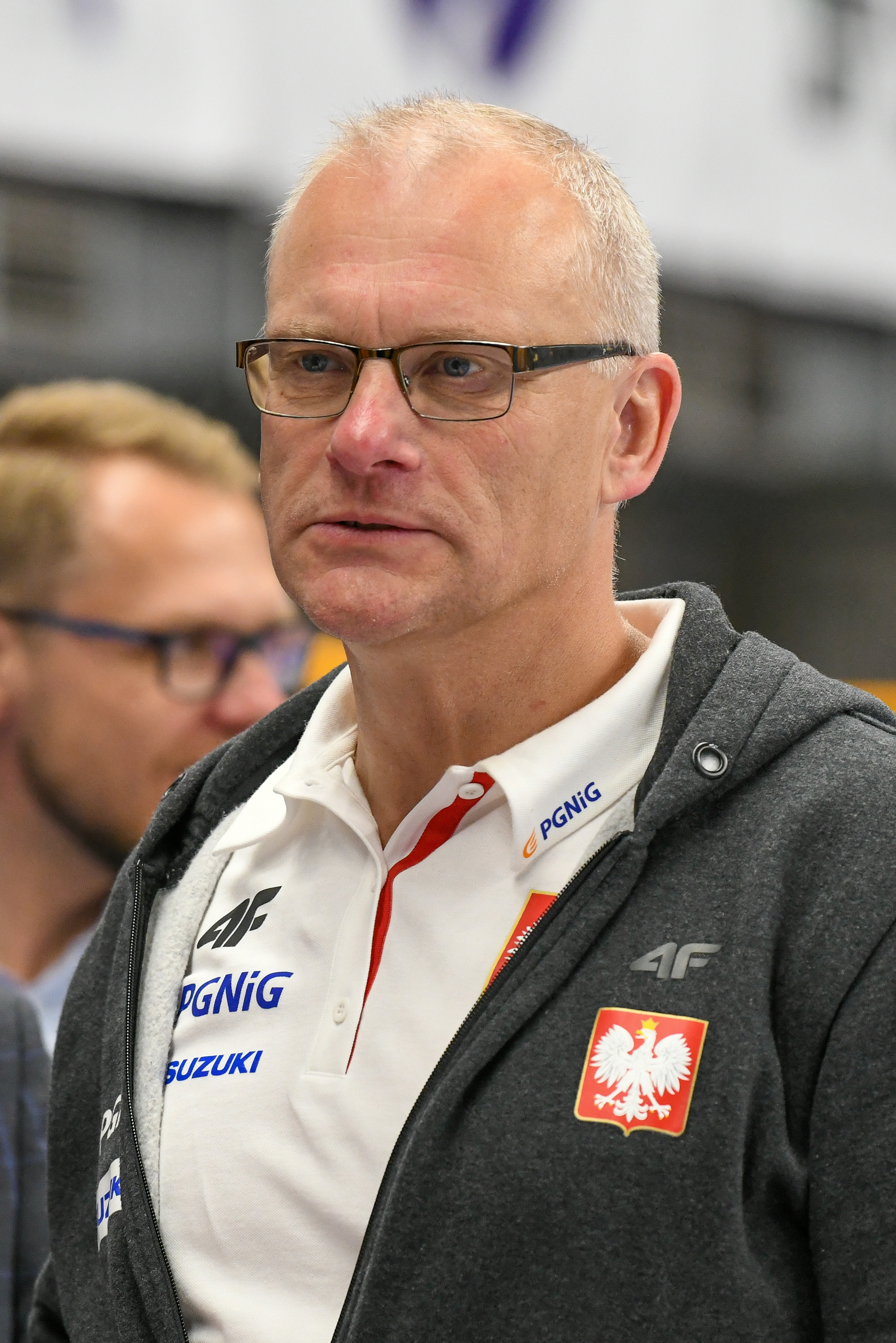

Personal information
- Nationality: Norwegian
- Born: 8 August 1969 (age 57) Kapp, Norway

Sport
- Sport: Handball
- Current club: Poland (manager)

Senior clubs
- Years: Team
- –1996: Fredensborg/Ski
- 1996–: TV Möhlin

Teams managed
- 2006–2013: Storhamar HE
- 2013–2015: Oppsal
- 2015–2019: Storhamar HE
- 2019–: Poland
- 2023–2025: Larvik HK

Arne Senstad (born 8 August 1969) is a professional Norwegian handball coach for the Polish women's national team.

== Playing career ==
Between 1989 and 1999 he played professional handball in Norway and Switzerland. He transferred from Fredensborg/Ski to TV Möhlin in 1996 on the basis of a tip from fellow player Stig Rasch.

== Coaching career ==
Between 2006 and 2013 he was coach of the Norwegian Storhamar HE women's team. 2007/08, 2009/10 and 2011/12 they became third at the Eliteserien. He received trainer of the year title in the 2011/2012 season.

2013 he started to coach Oppsal and reached the fourth place in his second season.

For the 2015/16 season he went back to Storhamar. Because of financial trouble Storhamar was relegated to the Division 1. They achieve the direct promotion in the following year. In the season 2017/18 they became again third and at following year they were runner-up in the league. 2018 they were also runner-up at the Norwegian cup. He received again the honor of coach of the year in 2019. He also reached the quarterfinal of the 2018–19 Women's EHF Cup.

On 19 August 2019 the Poland Handball Federation announced that Senstad will be the coach of the women's national team.
