= Manca Jurič =

Slovenian handball player

Personal information
- Full name: Manca Jurič
- Nationality: Slovenian
- Born: 18 January 1995 (age 31) Ljubljana, Slovenia
- Height: 1.73 m (5 ft 8 in)

Sport
- Sport: Handball
- Position: Centre back
- Current club: RK Krim
- Number: 3

Senior clubs
- Years: Team
- 2014-: RK Krim
National team
Years	Team	Apps	(Gls)
2016–	Slovenia	42	(39)
- Updated on 11 November 2026

Manca Jurič (born 18 January 1995) is a Slovenian handball player for RK Krim and the Slovenian national team.

She has represented Slovenia at the 2021 World Women's Handball Championship, 2023 World Women's Handball Championship, and the 2024 European Women's Handball Championship.
