= Ivana Djatevska =

Macedonian female handballer

Personal information
- Nationality: Macedonian
- Born: 13 April 2003 (age 23) Skopje, Macedonia
- Height: 1.79 m (5 ft 10 in)

Sport
- Sport: Handball
- Position: Line player
- Current club: Szombathelyi KKA
- Number: 13

Senior clubs
- Years: Team
- 2019–2024: ŽRK Vardar
- 2024–: Szombathelyi KKA
National team
| Years | Team | Apps | (Gls) |
| 2019– | North Macedonia | 13 | (2) |

Ivana Djatevska (born 13 April 2003) is a Macedonian female handballer for the Hungarian club Szombathelyi KKA and the North Macedonia national team.

She represented the North Macedonia at the 2022 European Women's Handball Championship.
