= Nuša Fegic =

Slovenian handball player (born 1994)

Personal information
- Nationality: Slovenian
- Born: 29 December 1998 (age 27) Postojna, Slovenia
- Height: 1.69 m (5 ft 7 in)

Sport
- Sport: Handball
- Position: Centre back
- Current club: Enea MKS Gniezno (Poland)
- Number: 24

Senior clubs
- Years: Team
- 2015–25: ŽRK Ajdovščina
National team
Years	Team	Apps	(Gls)
2024–	Slovenia	26	(56)
- Updated on 11 November 2026

Nuša Fegic (born 29 December 1998) is a Slovenian handballer for Enea MKS Gniezno in Polish ORLEN Women's Superliga and the Slovenian national team.

She participated at the 2024 European Women's Handball Championship in Hungary, Switzerland and Austria.
