= Ivana Arsenievska =

Macedonian female handballer

Personal information
- Nationality: Macedonian
- Born: 8 December 2003 (age 22) Delčevo, Macedonia
- Height: 1.73 m (5 ft 8 in)

Sport
- Sport: Handball
- Position: Centre back
- Current club: ŽRK Metalurg
- Number: 32

Senior clubs
- Years: Team
- 2022-: ŽRK Metalurg
National team
Years	Team	Apps	(Gls)
2020–	North Macedonia	3	(0)

Ivana Arsenievska (born 8 December 2003) is a North Macedonia female handballer for ŽRK Metalurg and the North Macedonia national team.

She represented the North Macedonia at the 2022 European Women's Handball Championship.
