= KPR Kobierzyce =

- Full name: Klub Piłki Ręcznej Gminy Kobierzyce
- Founded: 1998
- Arena: Hala widowiskowo-sportowa im. Adama Wójcika
- Capacity: 800
- President: Piotr Smoła
- Head coach: Edyta Majdzińska
- League: Ekstraklasa
- 2022–23: 3rd
- Club colours
| Home | Away |

KPR Kobierzyce is a women's handball team, based in Kobierzyce, founded in 1998. They are currently competing in the Ekstraklasa and Women's EHF European League.

== Achievements ==
- Ekstraklasa
  - Bronze: 2022, 2023
- Polish Cup (Puchar Polski)
  - Winners: 2022
  - Semifinals: 2022

== Team ==
=== Current squad ===
Squad for the 2022–23 season

Goalkeepers

- 1 (Poland) Beata Kowalczyk
- 94 (Poland) Patrycja Chojnacka

Left wingers

- 22 (Poland) Mariola Wiertelak

Right wingers

- 13 (Poland) Natalia Janas
- 23 (Poland) Patrycja Koziol

Line players

- 2 (Poland) Aleksandra Olek
- 24 (Poland) Zusanna Wazna
- 29 (Montenegro) Andjela Ivanović

Left backs

- 32 (Poland) Katarzyna Cygan
- 55 (North Macedonia) Zorica Despodovska
- 82 (Poland) Karolina Wicik

Centre backs

- 4 (Poland) Aleksandra Kucharska
- 9 (Poland) Aleksandra Tomczyk
- 11 (Poland) Małgorzata Buklarewicz
- 73 (Ukraine) Alona Shupyk
- 91 (Brazil) Vitoria Dos Santos de Macedo

Right backs

- 25 (Poland) Oliwia Domagalska

=== Transfers ===
Transfers for the 2023-24 season

Joining

Leaving

== See also ==
- Handball in Poland
- Sports in Poland
