= Handball at the 2009 Mediterranean Games – Women's tournament =

Women's handball at the 2009 Mediterranean Games
Tournament details
- Host country: Italy
- Venue: 1 (in 1 host city)
- Dates: 26 June – 4 July
- Teams: 9 (from 1 confederation)

Final positions
- Champions: France (3rd title)
- Runners-up: Turkey
- Third place: Montenegro
- Fourth place: Spain

Tournament statistics
- Matches played: 22
- Goals scored: 1,176 (53.45 per match)
- Top scorers: (Turkey) Serpil İskenderoğlu (46 goals)

The women's handball tournament at the 2009 Mediterranean Games was held from 26 June to 4 July in Chieti.

== Preliminary round ==
All times are local (UTC+2).

=== Group A ===
Pos	Team	Pld	W	D	L	GF	GA	GD	Pts	Qualification
1	Turkey	4	4	0	0	128	92	+36	8	Semifinals
2	Spain	4	3	0	1	134	77	+57	6	Semifinals
3	Croatia	4	2	0	2	111	115	−4	4	Fifth place game
4	Italy (H)	4	1	0	3	102	147	−45	2	Seventh place game
5	Greece	4	0	0	4	90	134	−44	0	

Source: Pescara 2009
Rules for classification: 1) Points; 2) Head-to-head points; 3) Head-to-head goal difference; 4) Head-to-head goals scored; 5) Goal difference; 6) Goals scored; 7) Draw.
(H) Hosts

26 June 2009; 15:00	Croatia	28–24	Greece	Santa Filomena Sports Hall, Chieti; Referees: Mondin, Cropanise (ITA)
26 June 2009; 15:00	Peraica 11	(15–8)	Foteiadou, Kazaki 6	Santa Filomena Sports Hall, Chieti; Referees: Mondin, Cropanise (ITA)
26 June 2009; 15:00	2× (yellow card) 1× (suspension)	Report	3× (yellow card) 5× (suspension) 1× (red card)	Santa Filomena Sports Hall, Chieti; Referees: Mondin, Cropanise (ITA)

26 June 2009; 17:00	Turkey	26–24	Spain	Santa Filomena Sports Hall, Chieti; Referees: Stojković, Nikolić (SRB)
26 June 2009; 17:00	İskenderoğlu 8	(10–12)	Alberto 8	Santa Filomena Sports Hall, Chieti; Referees: Stojković, Nikolić (SRB)
26 June 2009; 17:00	3× (yellow card) 10× (suspension) 1× (red card)	Report	3× (yellow card) 4× (suspension)	Santa Filomena Sports Hall, Chieti; Referees: Stojković, Nikolić (SRB)

27 June 2009; 15:00	Greece	19–35	Turkey	Santa Filomena Sports Hall, Chieti; Referees: Alperan, Scevola (ITA)
27 June 2009; 15:00	Kazaki 8	(9–14)	Özel 7	Santa Filomena Sports Hall, Chieti; Referees: Alperan, Scevola (ITA)
27 June 2009; 15:00	3× (yellow card) 6× (suspension)	Report	3× (yellow card) 3× (suspension)	Santa Filomena Sports Hall, Chieti; Referees: Alperan, Scevola (ITA)

27 June 2009; 17:00	Italy	26–38	Croatia	Santa Filomena Sports Hall, Chieti; Referees: Tzaferopoulos, Bethmann (GRE)
27 June 2009; 17:00	Di Fazio, Lampis 6	(13–19)	Maruščec 8	Santa Filomena Sports Hall, Chieti; Referees: Tzaferopoulos, Bethmann (GRE)
27 June 2009; 17:00	3× (yellow card) 4× (suspension)	Report	3× (yellow card) 4× (suspension)	Santa Filomena Sports Hall, Chieti; Referees: Tzaferopoulos, Bethmann (GRE)

28 June 2009; 14:00	Turkey	36–21	Italy	Santa Filomena Sports Hall, Chieti; Referees: Tzaferopoulos, Bethmann (GRE)
28 June 2009; 14:00	Gündar 5	(18–7)	Di Fazio 6	Santa Filomena Sports Hall, Chieti; Referees: Tzaferopoulos, Bethmann (GRE)
28 June 2009; 14:00	3× (yellow card) 5× (suspension)	Report	2× (yellow card) 4× (suspension)	Santa Filomena Sports Hall, Chieti; Referees: Tzaferopoulos, Bethmann (GRE)

28 June 2009; 18:00	Spain	36–14	Greece	Santa Filomena Sports Hall, Chieti; Referees: Dentz, Reibel (FRA)
28 June 2009; 18:00	Alberto 8	(17–6)	Strataki 5	Santa Filomena Sports Hall, Chieti; Referees: Dentz, Reibel (FRA)
28 June 2009; 18:00	3× (yellow card) 2× (suspension)	Report	3× (yellow card) 8× (suspension)	Santa Filomena Sports Hall, Chieti; Referees: Dentz, Reibel (FRA)

29 June 2009; 14:00	Italy	20–40	Spain	Santa Filomena Sports Hall, Chieti; Referees: Stojković, Nikolić (SRB)
29 June 2009; 14:00	Popescu 4	(13–19)	Alberto 9	Santa Filomena Sports Hall, Chieti; Referees: Stojković, Nikolić (SRB)
29 June 2009; 14:00	3× (yellow card) 8× (suspension) 1× (red card)	Report	3× (yellow card) 6× (suspension)	Santa Filomena Sports Hall, Chieti; Referees: Stojković, Nikolić (SRB)

29 June 2009; 18:00	Croatia	28–31	Turkey	Santa Filomena Sports Hall, Chieti; Referees: Dentz, Reibel (FRA)
29 June 2009; 18:00	Maruščec 6	(14–17)	İskenderoğlu 8	Santa Filomena Sports Hall, Chieti; Referees: Dentz, Reibel (FRA)
29 June 2009; 18:00	3× (yellow card) 3× (suspension)	Report	3× (yellow card) 6× (suspension) 1× (red card)	Santa Filomena Sports Hall, Chieti; Referees: Dentz, Reibel (FRA)

30 June 2009; 14:00	Spain	34–17	Croatia	Santa Filomena Sports Hall, Chieti; Referees: Mondin, Cropanise (ITA)
30 June 2009; 14:00	three players 6	(15–8)	Nikšić 4	Santa Filomena Sports Hall, Chieti; Referees: Mondin, Cropanise (ITA)
30 June 2009; 14:00	3× (yellow card) 5× (suspension)	Report	3× (yellow card) 5× (suspension)	Santa Filomena Sports Hall, Chieti; Referees: Mondin, Cropanise (ITA)

30 June 2009; 18:00	Greece	33–35	Italy	Santa Filomena Sports Hall, Chieti; Referees: Beji, Farah (TUN)
30 June 2009; 18:00	Poimenidou 12	(16–19)	Popescu 14	Santa Filomena Sports Hall, Chieti; Referees: Beji, Farah (TUN)
30 June 2009; 18:00	3× (yellow card) 8× (suspension) 1× (red card)	Report	3× (yellow card) 4× (suspension)	Santa Filomena Sports Hall, Chieti; Referees: Beji, Farah (TUN)

=== Group B ===
Pos	Team	Pld	W	D	L	GF	GA	GD	Pts	Qualification
1	France	3	2	0	1	96	75	+21	4 (Note: France 2 Pts, +15 GD; Montenegro 2 Pts, –2 GD; Serbia 2 Pts, –13 GD)	Semifinals
2	Montenegro	3	2	0	1	81	82	−1	4	Semifinals
3	Serbia	3	2	0	1	82	91	−9	4	Fifth place game
4	Slovenia	3	0	0	3	72	83	−11	0	Seventh place game

Source: Pescara 2009
Rules for classification: 1) Points; 2) Head-to-head points; 3) Head-to-head goal difference; 4) Head-to-head goals scored; 5) Goal difference; 6) Goals scored; 7) Draw.
Notes:

28 June 2009; 16:00	Serbia	24–40	France	Santa Filomena Sports Hall, Chieti; Referees: Gubica, Milošević (CRO)
28 June 2009; 16:00	three players 6	(12–20)	Goudjo, Piejos 6	Santa Filomena Sports Hall, Chieti; Referees: Gubica, Milošević (CRO)
28 June 2009; 16:00	2× (yellow card) 5× (suspension)	Report	3× (yellow card) 2× (suspension)	Santa Filomena Sports Hall, Chieti; Referees: Gubica, Milošević (CRO)

28 June 2009; 20:00	Slovenia	25–26	Montenegro	Santa Filomena Sports Hall, Chieti; Referees: Bekhoukhe, Benabderrahmane (ALG)
28 June 2009; 20:00	Šon 8	(11–13)	Radičević 8	Santa Filomena Sports Hall, Chieti; Referees: Bekhoukhe, Benabderrahmane (ALG)
28 June 2009; 20:00	3× (yellow card) 6× (suspension)	Report	2× (yellow card) 4× (suspension)	Santa Filomena Sports Hall, Chieti; Referees: Bekhoukhe, Benabderrahmane (ALG)

29 June 2009; 16:00	Montenegro	25–28	Serbia	Santa Filomena Sports Hall, Chieti; Referees: Mondin, Cropanise (ITA)
29 June 2009; 16:00	Radičević 7	(12–14)	Števin, Trifunović 6	Santa Filomena Sports Hall, Chieti; Referees: Mondin, Cropanise (ITA)
29 June 2009; 16:00	3× (yellow card) 6× (suspension)	Report	3× (yellow card) 8× (suspension) 1× (red card)	Santa Filomena Sports Hall, Chieti; Referees: Mondin, Cropanise (ITA)

29 June 2009; 20:00	France	27–21	Slovenia	Santa Filomena Sports Hall, Chieti; Referees: Bekhoukhe, Benabderrahmane (ALG)
29 June 2009; 20:00	Dembélé, Pineau 6	(13–11)	Gros 8	Santa Filomena Sports Hall, Chieti; Referees: Bekhoukhe, Benabderrahmane (ALG)
29 June 2009; 20:00	3× (yellow card) 4× (suspension)	Report	2× (yellow card) 6× (suspension)	Santa Filomena Sports Hall, Chieti; Referees: Bekhoukhe, Benabderrahmane (ALG)

30 June 2009; 16:00	Serbia	30–26	Slovenia	Santa Filomena Sports Hall, Chieti; Referees: Gubica, Milošević (CRO)
30 June 2009; 16:00	Trifunović 8	(15–12)	Mavsar 7	Santa Filomena Sports Hall, Chieti; Referees: Gubica, Milošević (CRO)
30 June 2009; 16:00	3× (yellow card) 5× (suspension)	Report	3× (yellow card) 6× (suspension) 1× (red card)	Santa Filomena Sports Hall, Chieti; Referees: Gubica, Milošević (CRO)

30 June 2009; 20:00	France	29–30	Montenegro	Santa Filomena Sports Hall, Chieti; Referees: Repenšek, Požežnik (SLO)
30 June 2009; 20:00	Baudouin 7	(19–13)	Jovanović 7	Santa Filomena Sports Hall, Chieti; Referees: Repenšek, Požežnik (SLO)
30 June 2009; 20:00	3× (yellow card) 5× (suspension)	Report	3× (yellow card) 4× (suspension)	Santa Filomena Sports Hall, Chieti; Referees: Repenšek, Požežnik (SLO)

== Playoffs ==
=== Bracket ===
Semifinals
2 July
Turkey	30
Montenegro	29
2 July
Spain	23
France	24

Gold medal
4 July
Turkey	32
France (OT)	33
Bronze medal
4 July
Montenegro	30
Spain	25

=== Semifinals ===
2 July 2009; 16:00	Turkey	30–29	Montenegro	Santa Filomena Sports Hall, Chieti; Referees: Mondin, Cropanise (ITA)
2 July 2009; 16:00	İskenderoğlu 11	(14–13)	Radičević 8	Santa Filomena Sports Hall, Chieti; Referees: Mondin, Cropanise (ITA)
2 July 2009; 16:00	3× (yellow card) 4× (suspension)	Report	3× (yellow card) 3× (suspension)	Santa Filomena Sports Hall, Chieti; Referees: Mondin, Cropanise (ITA)

2 July 2009; 18:30	Spain	23–24	France	Santa Filomena Sports Hall, Chieti; Referees: Stojković, Nikolić (SRB)
2 July 2009; 18:30	Fernández 5	(11–11)	Ayglon, Piejos 5	Santa Filomena Sports Hall, Chieti; Referees: Stojković, Nikolić (SRB)
2 July 2009; 18:30	3× (yellow card) 2× (suspension)	Report	3× (yellow card) 3× (suspension)	Santa Filomena Sports Hall, Chieti; Referees: Stojković, Nikolić (SRB)

=== Seventh place game ===
1 July 2009; 16:00	Italy	27–44	Slovenia	Santa Filomena Sports Hall, Chieti; Referees: Bekhoukhe, Benabderrahmane (ALG)
1 July 2009; 16:00	Popescu 7	(11–19)	Zrnec 8	Santa Filomena Sports Hall, Chieti; Referees: Bekhoukhe, Benabderrahmane (ALG)
1 July 2009; 16:00	3× (yellow card) 5× (suspension)	Report	3× (yellow card) 8× (suspension)	Santa Filomena Sports Hall, Chieti; Referees: Bekhoukhe, Benabderrahmane (ALG)

=== Fifth place game ===
1 July 2009; 18:30	Croatia	23–25	Serbia	Santa Filomena Sports Hall, Chieti; Referees: Alperan, Scevola (ITA)
1 July 2009; 18:30	Nikšić 5	(12–16)	Števin 7	Santa Filomena Sports Hall, Chieti; Referees: Alperan, Scevola (ITA)
1 July 2009; 18:30	3× (yellow card) 1× (suspension)	Report	3× (yellow card) 2× (suspension)	Santa Filomena Sports Hall, Chieti; Referees: Alperan, Scevola (ITA)

=== Bronze medal game ===
4 July 2009; 16:00	Montenegro	30–25	Spain	Santa Filomena Sports Hall, Chieti; Referees: Beji, Farah (TUN)
4 July 2009; 16:00	Jovanović 9	(12–11)	Fernández 9	Santa Filomena Sports Hall, Chieti; Referees: Beji, Farah (TUN)
4 July 2009; 16:00	3× (yellow card) 7× (suspension)	Report	2× (yellow card) 4× (suspension)	Santa Filomena Sports Hall, Chieti; Referees: Beji, Farah (TUN)

=== Gold medal game ===
4 July 2009
18:30
Turkey
32–33 (ET)
France
Santa Filomena Sports Hall, Chieti
Referees: Gubica, Milošević (CRO)
İskenderoğlu 13
(9–14)
Pineau 7
3× (yellow card) 8× (suspension) 1× (red card)
Report
3× (yellow card) 6× (suspension)

FT: 24–24 ET: 4–4, 4–5

== Final standings ==
Rank	Team
1st place, gold medalist(s)	France
2nd place, silver medalist(s)	Turkey
3rd place, bronze medalist(s)	Montenegro
4	Spain
5	Serbia
6	Croatia
7	Slovenia
8	Italy
9	Greece
