= Serpil Çapar =

Turkish handball player (born 1981)

Personal information
- Born: July 7, 1981 (age 45) Trabzon, Turkey
- Height: 1.73 m (5 ft 8 in)

Sport
- Sport: Handball
- Position: Goalkeeper
- Current club: Zağmos SK

Senior clubs
- Years: Team
- 1997–1998: YKM SK
- 2001–2013: Üsküdar Bld. SK
- 2014–2015: Kastamonu Bld. GSK
- 2015–: Zağmos SK
National team
- Years: Team
- –: Turkey
Medal record
Women's Handball
Representing Turkey
Mediterranean Games
Silver medal – second place	2009 Pescara	Team

Serpil Çapar (born July 7, 1981) is a Turkish women's handballer, who plays in the Turkish Women's Handball Super League for Zağmos SK. She was member of the Turkey national team. The 1.73 m (5 ft 8 in)-tall sportswoman is a goalkeeper.

== Playing career ==
=== Club ===
Çapar began her handball career at YKM SK, and enjoyed league champion title with her team in the 1997–98 season. She later transferred to Üsküdar Bld. SK, where she played until the end of the 2012–13 season. During this period, her team became twice league champion and five times runner-up.

Çapar joined Kastamonu Bld. GSK in the 2014–15 season. For the next season, she signed with her hometown club Zağmos SK.

She took part in the Women's EHF Champions League (1997–98 and 2011–12), the Women's EHF Challenge Cup (2001–02, 2006–07 and 2012–13), the Women's EHF Cup (2002–03, 2007–08 and 2008–09) as well as the Women's EHF Cup Winners' Cup (2003–04, 2009–10, 2010–11 and 2011–12).

=== International ===
Çapar played in the Turkey women's national team.

She was part of the team, which won the silver medal at the 2009 Mediterranean Games held in Pescara, Italy. In July 2013, she announced her retirement from the national team after the match against Spain at the 2013 Mediterranean Games held in Mersin, Turkey.

== Honours ==
Turkish Women's Handball Super League

- Winners (3): 1997–98, 2003–04, 2010–11
- Runners-up (5): 2007–08, 2008–09, 2009–10, 2011–12, 2012–13.
- Third place (1): 2014–15

Handball at the Mediterranean Games

- Runner-up (1): 2009
