= Handball at the 2009 Mediterranean Games =

- Dates: 26 June – 5 July
- Nations: 13
- Teams: 9 (men); 9 (women)

Champions
- Men: Serbia
- Women: France

The handball competition at the 2009 Mediterranean Games took place from 26 June to 5 July 2009. Both the men's and the women's tournaments were contested by 9 teams.

== Medal summary ==
=== Events ===
| Event | Gold | Silver | Bronze |
|---|---|---|---|
| Men | Serbia Petar Đorđić; Jožef Holpert; Veljko Inđić; Nenad Malencić; Dragan Marjanac; Dobrivoje Marković; Savo Mešter; Petar Nenadić; Dragan Počuča; Rajko Prodanović; Momir Rnić; Žarko Šešum; Aleksandar Stojanović; Tomislav Stojković; Dragan Tubić; Uroš Vilovski | France William Accambray; Igor Anic; Bruno Arive; Rémi Calvel; Raphaël Caucheteux; François-Xavier Chapon; Bastien Cismondo; Nicolas Claire; Adrien Dipanda; Cyril Dumoulin; Benjamin Gille; Benjamin Massot-Pellet; Pierre Montorier; Mickaël Robin; Guillaume Saurina; Damien Waeghe | Tunisia Anouar Ayed; Majed Ben Amor; Driss Drissi; Mahmoud Gharbi; Marouene Hadj Ahmed; Selim Hedoui; Maher Kraiem; Brahim Lagha; Rayane Laribi; Anis Mahmoudi; Bassem Mrabet; Sobhi Saïed; Jaleleddine Touati; Ghali Yousri; Slim Zeheni; Wassim Zeriat |
| Women | France Camille Ayglon; Paule Baudouin; Blandine Dancette; Cléopâtre Darleux; Siraba Dembélé; Audrey Deroin; Alice Durand; Stéphanie Fiossonangaye; Amélie Goudjo; Alice Lévêque; Marion Limal; Nina Morel; Katty Piejos; Allison Pineau; Linda Pradel; Mariama Signaté | Turkey Sevda Akbulut; Fatma Akgün; Fatma Atalar; Serpil Çapar; Esra Gündar; Sevilay İmamoğlu Öcal; Serpil İskenderoğlu; Gonca Nahcıvanlı; Yeliz Özel; Esra Öztürk; Selma Pekmutlu; Yasemin Şahin; Derya Tınkaoğlu; Senar Yeşilbayır; Betül Yılmaz; Yeliz Yılmaz | Montenegro Sonja Barjaktarović; Ivana Božović; Ivana Dragaš; Anđela Dragutinović; Đurđica Đurović; Marija Jovanović; Milena Knežević; Suzana Lazović; Jelena Marković; Majda Mehmedović; Mirjana Milenković; Radmila Miljanić; Jovanka Radičević; Ana Radović |

=== Medal table ===
| Rank | Nation | Gold | Silver | Bronze | Total |
|---|---|---|---|---|---|
| 1 | France | 1 | 1 | 0 | 2 |
| 2 | Serbia | 1 | 0 | 0 | 1 |
| 3 | Turkey | 0 | 1 | 0 | 1 |
| 4 | Montenegro | 0 | 0 | 1 | 1 |
| 4 | Tunisia | 0 | 0 | 1 | 1 |
| Totals (5 entries) | | 2 | 2 | 2 | 6 |

== Participating nations ==
Men

| Federation | Nation |
|---|---|
| CAHB Africa | Algeria; Tunisia |
| EHF Europe | Albania; Bosnia and Herzegovina; France; Greece; Italy; Serbia; Turkey |

Women

| Federation | Nation |
|---|---|
| EHF Europe | Croatia; France; Greece; Italy; Montenegro; Serbia; Slovenia; Spain; Turkey |
