= Neslihan Çalışkan =

Turkish handball player (born 1997)

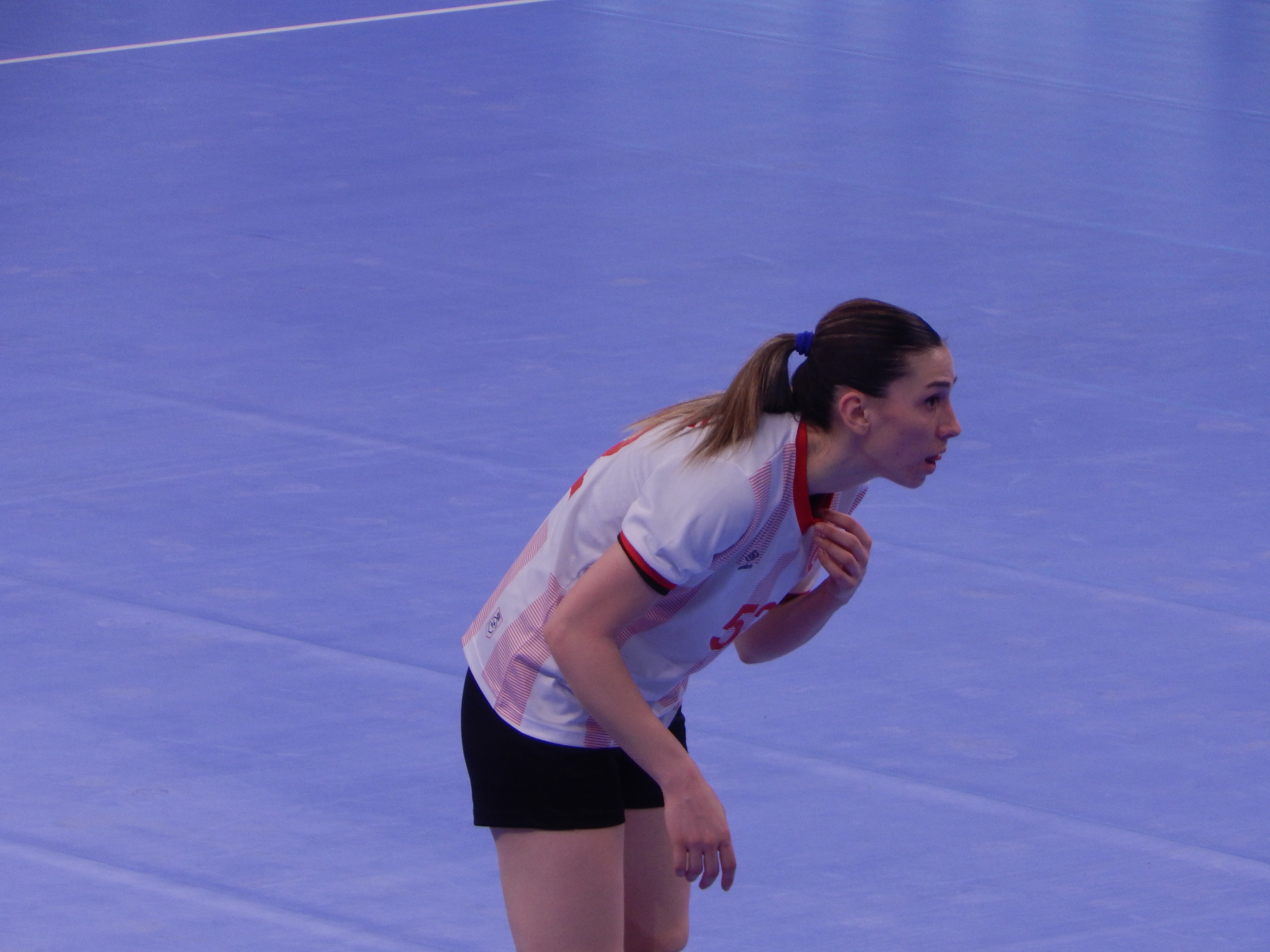
- Neslihan Çalışkan at the 2021 World Women's Handball Championship – European qualification

Personal information
- Born: 29 July 1997 (age 29) İzmir, Turkey
- Height: 1.81 m (5 ft 11 in)

Sport
- Sport: Handball
- Position: Left back
- Current club: ŽRK Budućnost Podgorica

Youth career
- Years: Team
- –: Kemalpaşa Bld. GSK

Senior clubs
- Years: Team
- –: Kemalpaşa Bld. GSK
- 2015–2019: Ardeşen GSK
- 2019–2021: Üsküdar Bld. SK
- 2021–2023: Kastamonu Bld. GSK
- 2023–: ŽRK Budućnost Podgorica
National team
- Years: Team
- 2013–2014: Turkey U-17
- 2015–: Turkey
Medal record
Representing Turkey
Women's Handball
Islamic Solidarity Games
Gold medal – first place	2021 Konya	Team

Neslihan Çalışkan (born 29 July 1997) is a Turkish women's handballer, who plays as left back for ŽRK Budućnost Podgorica in the Montenegrin First League, and the Turkey national team.

== Personal life ==
Neslihan Çalışkan was born in İzmir, Turkey on 29 July 1997.

== Club career ==
Çalışkan had already started playing handball in the primary school in 2008, encouraged by her physical education teacher, who also coached the farmer team for girls of the local handball club Kemalpaşa Bld. GSK. She has been always supported by her parents to pursue handball. She is 1.81 m (5 ft 11 1/2 in) tall at 70 kg (150 lb). She plays in the left back position.

=== Kemalpaşa Bld. GSK ===
Çalışkan started her sport career at Kemalpaşa Bld. GSK, also known as Kemalpaşa Ata GSK, in her hometown Kemalpaşa in İzmir.

=== Ardeşen GSK ===
She transferred to Ardeşen GSK in Rize, northeastern Turkey, to play in the 2015–16 Turkish Women's Handball Super League season. At the end of the season, she experienced her team's league champion title. Her team finished the 2016–17 season in the third place, as well as the 2018–19 season.

She played at the 2015–16 EHF Cup Winners' Cup,

=== Üsküdar Bld. SK ===
Between 2019 and 2021, she was two seasons with the Istanbul-based club Üsküdar Bld. SK. Late September 2021, she left her club.

=== Kastamonu Bld. GSK ===
For the 2021–22 Turkish Super League season, she transferred in September 2021 to Kastamonu Bld. GSK. At the end of the season, she experienced her team's champion title.

She took part at the Women's EHF Champions League in 2021–22, and 2022–23. She won the 2022–23 Turkeish Super League wşth her team.

=== ŽRK Budućnost ===
In January 2023, Çalışkan signed a two-years deal with ŽRK Budućnost Podgorica to play in the Montenegrin First League.

== International career ==
In 2012, she was called up to the preparation camp of the Turkey women's national under-17 handball team. In 2013, she was admitted to the Turkey girls' U-17 team, and debuted at the Balkan Handball Youth Championships held in Burgas, Bulgaria. She returned home with the gold medal.

Çalışkan was called up to the Turkey women's national handball team at the age of 18. She won the gold medal at the 2017 Istamic Solidarity Games in Baku, Azerbaycan. She took part at the 2018 European Championship qualification, and 2021 World Championship – European qualification matches. In 2022, she played in the national team, which became champion at the 5th Islamic Solidarity Games in Konya, Turkey.

== Honours ==
=== Club ===
Turkish Women's Handball Super League

Ardeşen GSK
Champion (1): 2015–16.SK
Third places (2): 2016–17, 2018–19.

Kastamonu Bld. GSK
Champion (2): 2021–22, 2022–23.

=== International ===
Turkey women's national under-17 handball team

Balkan Youth Handball Championships
Champion (1): 2013.

Turkey women's national handball team

Islamic Solidarity Games
Champion (1): 2021.
