= Yasemin Şahin =

Turkish handball player (born 1988)

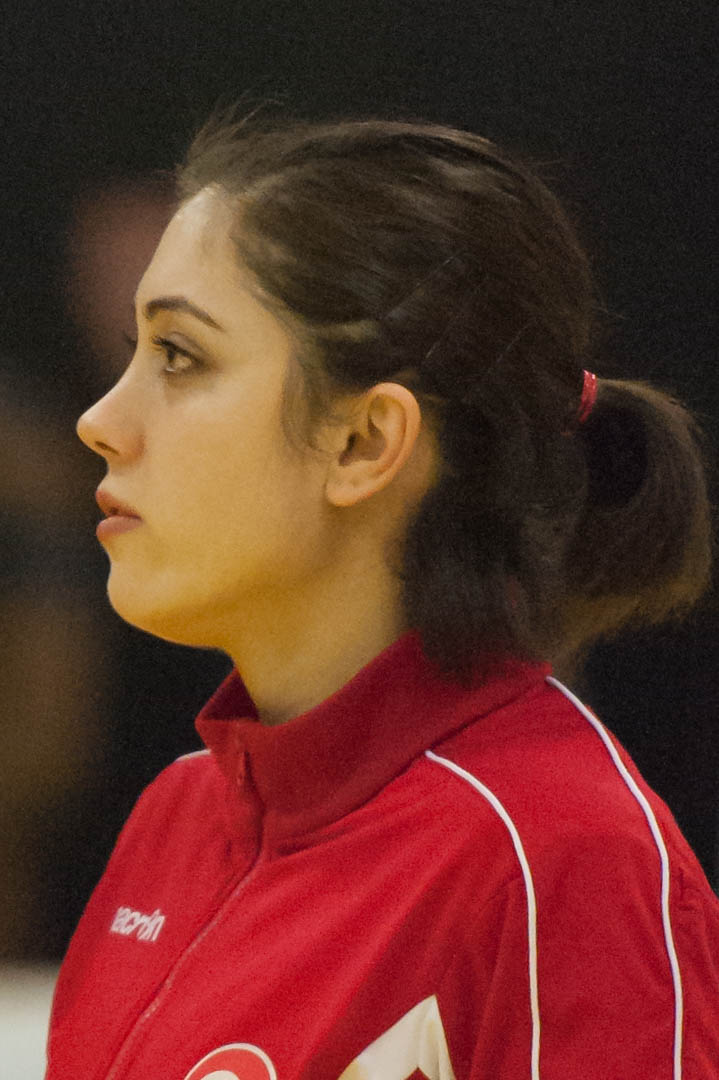
- Yasemin Şahin at the 2015 World Women's Handball Championship qualification.

Personal information
- Nationality: Turkish
- Born: 25 June 1988 (age 38) Ankara, Turkey
- Height: 168 cm (66 in)

Sport
- Sport: Handball
- Position: Left wing
- Current club: Yalıkavak . SK

Senior clubs
- Years: Team
- 2003–2005; 2006–2007; 2008–2011; 2011–2013; 2013–2014; 2014–2015; 2015–2019; 2020–2021; 2022–: Havelsan Ankara; Maliye Milli Piyango SK; İzmir BB SK; Üsküdar Bld. SK; Muratpaşa Bld. SK; Kastamonu Bld. GSK; Muratpaşa Bld. SK; Yalıkavak SK; Konyaaltı Bld. SK
National team
| Years | Team | Apps | (Gls) |
| – | Turkey | 96 | (341) |
Medal record
Women's Handball
Representing Turkey
Mediterranean Games
| Silver medal – second place | 2009 Pescara | Team |
Islamic Solidarity Games
| Gold medal – first place | 2021 Konya | Team |
| Silver medal – second place | 2017 Baku | Team |
- Updated on December 2024

Yasemin Şahin (born June 25, 1988, in Ankara, Turkey) is a Turkish handballer playing in left wing position. The 1.68 m (5 ft 6 in) tall sportswoman is a member of the Antalya-based club Konyaaltı Bld.SK in the Turkish Super League and the Turkish national team.

== Club career ==
Yasemin Şahin played for İzmir BB SK before she moved to Üsküdar Bld. SK. After one season with Muratpaşa Bld. SK in Antalya, she was transferred by Kastamonu Bld. GSK for the 2014–15 season. In June 2015, she returned to her former club Muratpaşa Bld. SK, signing a one-year contract with plus-one-year option. In the 2020–21 Super League season, she played for Yalıkavak SK in Bodrum, Muğla. In 2022, she transferred to the Antalya-based club Konyaaltı Bld. SK.

== National team ==
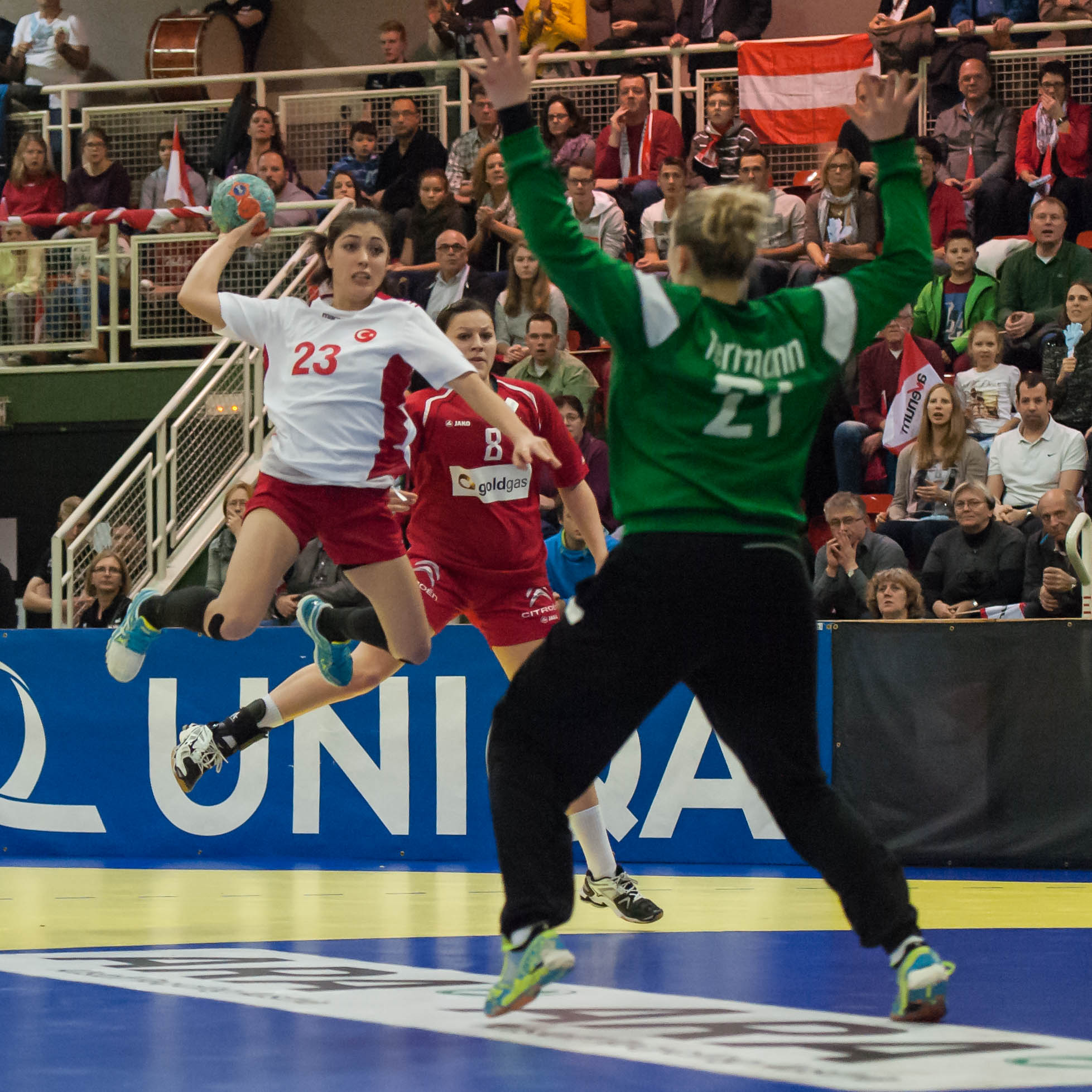
Yasemin Şahin attacking Austria at the 2015 World Women's Handball Championship European qualification match.

She played for Turkey at the 2013 Mediterranean Games, 2014 European Championship qualification and 2015 World Championship – European qualification matches. Currently, she is taking part at the 2016 European Championship qualification matches. In 2022, she played in the national team, which became champion at the 5th Islamic Solidarity Games in Konya, Turkey.
