= Yeliz Yılmaz =

Turkish handball player

Personal information
- Full name: thumb
- Nationality: Turkish
- Born: 19 August 1980 (age 46) Istanbul, Turkey
- Height: 1.77 m (5 ft 10 in)

Sport
- Sport: Handball
- Position: Right Back
- Current club: Yalıkavak SK.
- Number: 9

Senior clubs
- Years: Team
- 1997–1999: YKM Istanbul
- 2000–2004: Üsküdar Bld. SK
- 2004–2006: Havelsan Ankara
- 2006–2007: CS Rulmentul Brasov
- 2007–2013: Üsküdar Bld. SK
- 2013–2014: Maltepe Bld. GSK
- 2014–2015: 1907 Kanaryaspor
- 2015–2017: Kastamonu Bld. GSK
- 2017–2018: Üsküdar Bld. SK
- 2018: Yalıkavak SK.
National team
- Years: Team
- –: Turkey
Medal record
Women's handball
Representing Turkey
Islamic Solidarity Games
Silver medal – second place	2017 Baku	Team
Mediterranean Games
Silver medal – second place	2009 Pescara	Team

Yeliz Yılmaz (born 19 August 1980) is a Turkish handballer playing in the Turkish Women's Handball Super League for Kastamonu Bld. GSK. She has been a member of the Turkish national team. The 1.77-metre-tall (5 ft 10 in) sportswomen plays in the right back position.

== Club career ==
Yeliz Yılmaz played for several teams in Turkey, including Üsküdar Bld. SK (2000–2004, 2007–2013), Havelsan SK (2004–2006), Maltepe Bld. SK (2013–14), and 1907 Kanaryaspor (2014–15). She was also in Romania with CS Rulmentul Brasov (2006–07).

In June 2015, she transferred to Kastamonu Bld. GSK from 1907 Kanaryaspor. In June 2017, she transferred to Üsküdar Bld. from Kastamonu Bld. GSK. After she played 1 season for Üsküdar she went to Yalıkavak Spor Kulübü. Since 2018 she is captain of the Yalıkavak Spor Kulübü.

She took part in the Women's EHF Champions League (1997–98, 1998–99, 2005–06, 2006–07 and 2011–12), the Women's EHF Challenge Cup (2001–02, 2012–13, 2013–14 and 2015–16), the Women's EHF Cup (2002–03, 2005–06, 2006–07, 2007–08 and 2008–09) as well as the Women's EHF Cup Winners' Cup (2003–04, 2004–05, 2009–10, 2010–11 and 2011–12).

== International career ==
Yılmaz played more than 400 times for the Turkish national team. Yılmaz is part of the Turkey women's national handball team. She played the 2012 European Women's Handball Championship qualification matches.

She was member of the silver medal-winning national team at the 2009 Mediterranean Games held in Pescara, Italy. In 2017, she won the silver medal with the national team at the Islamic Solidarity Games in Baku, Azerbaycan.

Yılmaz was part of the Turkey women's national beach handball team.

== Honours ==
=== Club ===
Turkish Women's Handball Super League

- Winners (4): 1997–98, 2003–04, 2004–05, 2010–11
- Runners-up (5): 2007–08, 2008–09, 2009–10, 2011–12, 2013–13

=== International ===
Handball at the Mediterranean Games

- Runner-up (1): 2009
