= Fatma Atalar =

Turkish handballer

Personal information
- Born: October 9, 1988 (age 38) Zanguldak, Turkey
- Height: 1.70 m (5 ft 7 in)

Sport
- Sport: Handball
- Position: Center back
- Current club: İzmir B.B. SK
- Number: 9
National team
- Years: Team
- –: Turkey
Medal record
Women's Handball
Representing Turkey
Islamic Solidarity Games
| Silver medal – second place | 2017 Baku | Team |
Mediterranean Games
| Silver medal – second place | 2009 Pescara | Team |

Fatma Atalar (born October 9, 1988) is a Turkish women's handballer, who plays in the Turkish Women's Handball Super League for İzmir B.B. SK, and the Turkey national team. The 1.70 m (5 ft 7 in)-tall sportswoman plays in the center back position.

== Club career ==
She played for Trabzon Bld. SK (2006–2007) before joining İzmir B.B. SK in 2013.

== International career ==
She is a member of the Turkey national team. In 2017, she was part of the national team that won the silver medal at the Islamic Solidarity Games in Baku, Azerbaijan.
