= Handball at the 2017 Islamic Solidarity Games =

2017 Islamic Solidarity Games

- Venue: Sarhadchi Arena
- Dates: 9–14 May

Handball at the 2017 Islamic Solidarity Games was held in Azerbaijan from 9 to 14 May 2017.

== Medal table ==
Rank	Nation	Gold	Silver	Bronze	Total
1	Azerbaijan (AZE)	1	0	0	1
1	Saudi Arabia (KSA)	1	0	0	1
3	Turkey (TUR)	0	2	0	2
4	Cameroon (CMR)	0	0	1	1
4	Iraq (IRQ)	0	0	1	1
Totals (5 entries)		2	2	2	6

== Medalists ==
Event	Gold	Silver	Bronze
Men	Saudi Arabia; Abdullah Al-Abbas; Hassan Al-Janabi; Hussain Al-Mohsin; Abdullah Al-Hammad; Hassan Al-Khadrawi; Abdulazez Saeed; Mohammed Al-Salem; Fahad Al-Farhan; Nawaf Al-Mutairi; Mahdi Al-Salem; Hisham Al-Obaidi; Hassan Ghazwi; Mojtaba Al-Salem; Mohammed Al-Zaer	Turkey; Alp Eren Pektaş; Doruk Pehlivan; Uğur Erceylan; Coşkun Göktepe; Enes Gümüşok; Baran Nalbantoğlu; Tuğberk Çatkın; Onur Ersin; Taner Günay; Halil İbrahim Öztürk; Gökhan Örnek; Ramazan Döne; Çetin Çelik; Hüseyin Pamuk	Iraq; Bilal Hasan; Majid Abdul-Ridha; Hussein Ali; Jasim Ghassab; Ahmed Makki; Mustafa Mahmood; Mohanad Adil; Ali Tariq; Ali Abdul-Ridha; Mohammed Sahib; Maytham Oudah; Mustafa Mohammed; Ali Adnan; Baderaldeen Hammoudi
Women	Azerbaijan; Sabina Nuriyeva; Anna Hamidova; Marina Tankaskaya; Anastasiya Metelska; Irana Gasimova; Anna Burova; Maria Rachiteleva; Sakinat Abbasova; Ekaterina Artamonova; Oksana Orekhova; Yekaterina Peche; Irina Klimenko; Alla Chernyshkova; Natalia Gaiovich	Turkey; Sevilay İmamoğlu Öcal; Esra Öztürk; Beyza İrem Türkoğlu; Gonca Nahcıvanlı; Yeliz Özel; Yeliz Yılmaz; Serpil İskenderoğlu; Nurceren Akgün; Derya Tınkaoğlu; Fatma Atalar; Yasemin Şahin; Aslı İskit; Ümmügülsüm Bedel; Olha Vashchuk	Cameroon; Natacha Ebissienine; Anne Ngo; Paola Ebanga Baboga; Adjani Ngouoko; Scholastique Mfomo; Jacqueline Mossy; Morgane Ndongo; Hermine Ngo; Caroline Magaptche; Yolande Touba; Jasmine Yotchoum; Anne Essam

== Men ==
=== Preliminary round ===
==== Group A ====
Team	Pld	W	D	L	GF	GA	GD	Pts
Saudi Arabia	3	3	0	0	99	70	+29	6
Algeria	3	2	0	1	95	72	+23	4
Azerbaijan	3	1	0	2	96	109	−13	2
Pakistan	3	0	0	3	86	125	−39	0

9 May; 9:00	Saudi Arabia	26–13	Algeria	Sarhadchi Arena, Baku; Referees: Gasmi, Gasmi (FRA)
9 May; 9:00	Saeed 5	(13–7)	Naim 6	Sarhadchi Arena, Baku; Referees: Gasmi, Gasmi (FRA)
9 May; 9:00	2× (yellow card) 2× (suspension)	Report	2× (yellow card) 5× (suspension)	Sarhadchi Arena, Baku; Referees: Gasmi, Gasmi (FRA)

9 May; 18:00	Pakistan	36–43	Azerbaijan	Sarhadchi Arena, Baku; Referees: Hussein, Imran (IRQ)
9 May; 18:00	H. Hussain 10	(15–20)	Butenko 11	Sarhadchi Arena, Baku; Referees: Hussein, Imran (IRQ)
9 May; 18:00	2× (yellow card) 2× (suspension)	Report	2× (yellow card) 7× (suspension)	Sarhadchi Arena, Baku; Referees: Hussein, Imran (IRQ)

10 May; 9:00	Algeria	47–24	Pakistan	Sarhadchi Arena, Baku; Referees: Rashed, El-Sayed (EGY)
10 May; 9:00	Feredj 8	(20–8)	Pervaiz, Z. Hussain 6	Sarhadchi Arena, Baku; Referees: Rashed, El-Sayed (EGY)
10 May; 9:00	3× (yellow card) 1× (suspension)	Report	1× (yellow card) 2× (suspension)	Sarhadchi Arena, Baku; Referees: Rashed, El-Sayed (EGY)

10 May; 20:15	Azerbaijan	31–38	Saudi Arabia	Sarhadchi Arena, Baku; Referees: Hussein, Imran (IRQ)
10 May; 20:15	Georgiyevski, Sukić 7	(14–19)	Al-Obaidi 10	Sarhadchi Arena, Baku; Referees: Hussein, Imran (IRQ)
10 May; 20:15	2× (yellow card) 2× (suspension) 1× (red card)	Report	4× (yellow card) 8× (suspension) 1× (red card)	Sarhadchi Arena, Baku; Referees: Hussein, Imran (IRQ)

11 May; 11:15	Saudi Arabia	35–26	Pakistan	Sarhadchi Arena, Baku; Referees: Aghakishi, Aghakishi (AZE)
11 May; 11:15	Ghazwi 10	(18–10)	H. Hussain 6	Sarhadchi Arena, Baku; Referees: Aghakishi, Aghakishi (AZE)
11 May; 11:15	4× (yellow card) 4× (suspension)	Report	3× (yellow card) 2× (suspension)	Sarhadchi Arena, Baku; Referees: Aghakishi, Aghakishi (AZE)

11 May; 20:15	Azerbaijan	22–35	Algeria	Sarhadchi Arena, Baku; Referees: Gasmi, Gasmi (FRA)
11 May; 20:15	Sukić 6	(11–15)	Naim, Djeghaba 7	Sarhadchi Arena, Baku; Referees: Gasmi, Gasmi (FRA)
11 May; 20:15	3× (yellow card) 7× (suspension) 1× (red card)	Report	4× (yellow card) 5× (suspension)	Sarhadchi Arena, Baku; Referees: Gasmi, Gasmi (FRA)

==== Group B ====
Team	Pld	W	D	L	GF	GA	GD	Pts
Turkey	3	3	0	0	88	78	+10	6
Iraq	3	2	0	1	95	72	+23	4
Morocco	3	1	0	2	73	68	+5	2
Jordan	3	0	0	3	52	90	−38	0

9 May; 11:15	Morocco	24–27	Turkey	Sarhadchi Arena, Baku; Referees: Al-Mawt, Al-Marhoon (BHR)
9 May; 11:15	Kossai 7	(8–12)	Döne 8	Sarhadchi Arena, Baku; Referees: Al-Mawt, Al-Marhoon (BHR)
9 May; 11:15	3× (yellow card) 5× (suspension)	Report	3× (yellow card) 6× (suspension) 1× (red card)	Sarhadchi Arena, Baku; Referees: Al-Mawt, Al-Marhoon (BHR)

9 May; 20:15	Iraq	37–15	Jordan	Sarhadchi Arena, Baku; Referees: Rashed, El-Sayed (EGY)
9 May; 20:15	Hammoudi 6	(20–7)	Abu-Hasan 4	Sarhadchi Arena, Baku; Referees: Rashed, El-Sayed (EGY)
9 May; 20:15	3× (yellow card) 5× (suspension) 1× (red card)	Report	4× (yellow card) 1× (suspension)	Sarhadchi Arena, Baku; Referees: Rashed, El-Sayed (EGY)

10 May; 11:15	Turkey	35–33	Iraq	Sarhadchi Arena, Baku; Referees: Gasmi, Gasmi (FRA)
10 May; 11:15	Döne 15	(17–19)	Ali 10	Sarhadchi Arena, Baku; Referees: Gasmi, Gasmi (FRA)
10 May; 11:15	4× (yellow card) 5× (suspension)	Report	3× (yellow card) 7× (suspension) 1× (red card)	Sarhadchi Arena, Baku; Referees: Gasmi, Gasmi (FRA)

10 May; 18:00	Jordan	16–27	Morocco	Sarhadchi Arena, Baku; Referees: Aghakishi, Aghakishi (AZE)
10 May; 18:00	Abu-Hasan 6	(6–15)	Hamed 7	Sarhadchi Arena, Baku; Referees: Aghakishi, Aghakishi (AZE)
10 May; 18:00	2× (yellow card)	Report	3× (yellow card) 3× (suspension)	Sarhadchi Arena, Baku; Referees: Aghakishi, Aghakishi (AZE)

11 May; 9:00	Morocco	22–25	Iraq	Sarhadchi Arena, Baku; Referees: Al-Mawt, Al-Marhoon (BHR)
11 May; 9:00	Hamed 5	(11–10)	Ali 11	Sarhadchi Arena, Baku; Referees: Al-Mawt, Al-Marhoon (BHR)
11 May; 9:00	4× (yellow card) 8× (suspension) 1× (red card)	Report	4× (yellow card) 4× (suspension)	Sarhadchi Arena, Baku; Referees: Al-Mawt, Al-Marhoon (BHR)

11 May; 18:00	Jordan	21–26	Turkey	Sarhadchi Arena, Baku; Referees: Alpaidze, Berezkina (RUS)
11 May; 18:00	Al-Hindawi 8	(10–11)	Ersin 6	Sarhadchi Arena, Baku; Referees: Alpaidze, Berezkina (RUS)
11 May; 18:00	3× (yellow card) 5× (suspension)	Report	3× (yellow card) 2× (suspension) 1× (red card)	Sarhadchi Arena, Baku; Referees: Alpaidze, Berezkina (RUS)

=== Placement 5th–8th ===
==== 7th/8th ====
12 May; 9:00	Pakistan	33–31	Jordan	Sarhadchi Arena, Baku; Referees: Rashed, El-Sayed (EGY)
12 May; 9:00	H. Hussain 10	(18–14)	Abu-Hasan 10	Sarhadchi Arena, Baku; Referees: Rashed, El-Sayed (EGY)
12 May; 9:00	2× (yellow card) 6× (suspension)	Report	3× (yellow card) 2× (suspension)	Sarhadchi Arena, Baku; Referees: Rashed, El-Sayed (EGY)

==== 5th/6th ====
12 May; 11:15	Azerbaijan	31–25	Morocco	Sarhadchi Arena, Baku; Referees: Florescu, Stoia (ROU)
12 May; 11:15	Nazaraliyev 10	(15–10)	Bourguiba 6	Sarhadchi Arena, Baku; Referees: Florescu, Stoia (ROU)
12 May; 11:15	3× (yellow card) 8× (suspension)	Report	4× (yellow card) 8× (suspension)	Sarhadchi Arena, Baku; Referees: Florescu, Stoia (ROU)

=== Final round ===
Semifinals
13 May
Saudi Arabia	28
Iraq	24
13 May
Algeria	22
Turkey	26

Gold medal match
14 May
Saudi Arabia	26
Turkey	21
Bronze medal match
14 May
Iraq	27
Algeria	22

==== Semifinals ====
13 May; 11:15	Saudi Arabia	28–24	Iraq	Sarhadchi Arena, Baku; Referees: Gasmi, Gasmi (FRA)
13 May; 11:15	Moj. Al-Salem 8	(13–12)	Ali 8	Sarhadchi Arena, Baku; Referees: Gasmi, Gasmi (FRA)
13 May; 11:15	2× (yellow card) 1× (suspension)	Report	2× (yellow card) 5× (suspension)	Sarhadchi Arena, Baku; Referees: Gasmi, Gasmi (FRA)

13 May; 15:45	Algeria	22–26	Turkey	Sarhadchi Arena, Baku; Referees: Aghakishi, Aghakishi (AZE)
13 May; 15:45	Naim 7	(9–14)	Döne 9	Sarhadchi Arena, Baku; Referees: Aghakishi, Aghakishi (AZE)
13 May; 15:45	3× (yellow card) 2× (suspension)	Report	3× (yellow card) 5× (suspension)	Sarhadchi Arena, Baku; Referees: Aghakishi, Aghakishi (AZE)

==== Bronze medal match ====
14 May; 11:15	Iraq	27–22	Algeria	Sarhadchi Arena, Baku; Referees: Aghakishi, Aghakishi (AZE)
14 May; 11:15	Ghassab 7	(17–10)	Naim 9	Sarhadchi Arena, Baku; Referees: Aghakishi, Aghakishi (AZE)
14 May; 11:15	3× (yellow card) 6× (suspension)	Report	3× (yellow card) 2× (suspension)	Sarhadchi Arena, Baku; Referees: Aghakishi, Aghakishi (AZE)

==== Gold medal match ====
14 May; 15:45	Saudi Arabia	26–21	Turkey	Sarhadchi Arena, Baku; Referees: Al-Mawt, Al-Marhoon (BHR)
14 May; 15:45	Al-Obaidi 8	(12–10)	Döne 6	Sarhadchi Arena, Baku; Referees: Al-Mawt, Al-Marhoon (BHR)
14 May; 15:45	3× (yellow card) 5× (suspension)	Report	3× (yellow card) 5× (suspension) 1× (red card)	Sarhadchi Arena, Baku; Referees: Al-Mawt, Al-Marhoon (BHR)

== Women ==
=== Preliminary round ===
Team	Pld	W	D	L	GF	GA	GD	Pts
Azerbaijan	3	3	0	0	102	69	+33	6
Turkey	3	2	0	1	92	79	+13	4
Cameroon	3	1	0	2	98	86	+12	2
Uzbekistan	3	0	0	3	67	125	−58	0

9 May; 13:30	Turkey	37–21	Uzbekistan	Sarhadchi Arena, Baku; Referees: Aghakishi, Aghakishi (AZE)
9 May; 13:30	İskit 8	(16–8)	Mustafaeva 8	Sarhadchi Arena, Baku; Referees: Aghakishi, Aghakishi (AZE)
9 May; 13:30	3× (yellow card) 4× (suspension)	Report	4× (yellow card) 5× (suspension)	Sarhadchi Arena, Baku; Referees: Aghakishi, Aghakishi (AZE)

9 May; 15:45	Cameroon	26–28	Azerbaijan	Sarhadchi Arena, Baku; Referees: Florescu, Stoia (ROU)
9 May; 15:45	Ndongo 6	(14–16)	Tankaskaya 10	Sarhadchi Arena, Baku; Referees: Florescu, Stoia (ROU)
9 May; 15:45	3× (yellow card) 8× (suspension)	Report	2× (yellow card) 3× (suspension)	Sarhadchi Arena, Baku; Referees: Florescu, Stoia (ROU)

10 May; 13:30	Cameroon	31–33	Turkey	Sarhadchi Arena, Baku; Referees: Al-Mawt, Al-Marhoon (BHR)
10 May; 13:30	Touba 10	(16–19)	Özel 10	Sarhadchi Arena, Baku; Referees: Al-Mawt, Al-Marhoon (BHR)
10 May; 13:30	4× (yellow card) 9× (suspension) 1× (red card)	Report	4× (yellow card) 2× (suspension)	Sarhadchi Arena, Baku; Referees: Al-Mawt, Al-Marhoon (BHR)

10 May; 15:45	Uzbekistan	21–47	Azerbaijan	Sarhadchi Arena, Baku; Referees: Alpaidze, Berezkina (RUS)
10 May; 15:45	Najmedinova 9	(9–23)	Metelska 9	Sarhadchi Arena, Baku; Referees: Alpaidze, Berezkina (RUS)
10 May; 15:45	2× (yellow card) 5× (suspension)	Report	3× (yellow card) 3× (suspension)	Sarhadchi Arena, Baku; Referees: Alpaidze, Berezkina (RUS)

11 May; 13:30	Uzbekistan	25–41	Cameroon	Sarhadchi Arena, Baku; Referees: Hussein, İmran (IRQ)
11 May; 13:30	Mustafaeva 6	(7–18)	Ebanga Baboga 10	Sarhadchi Arena, Baku; Referees: Hussein, İmran (IRQ)
11 May; 13:30	3× (yellow card)	Report	2× (yellow card) 2× (suspension)	Sarhadchi Arena, Baku; Referees: Hussein, İmran (IRQ)

11 May; 15:45	Azerbaijan	27–22	Turkey	Sarhadchi Arena, Baku; Referees: Florescu, Stoia (ROU)
11 May; 15:45	Artamonova 6	(10–8)	Özel 5	Sarhadchi Arena, Baku; Referees: Florescu, Stoia (ROU)
11 May; 15:45	2× (yellow card) 3× (suspension)	Report	3× (yellow card) 6× (suspension)	Sarhadchi Arena, Baku; Referees: Florescu, Stoia (ROU)

=== Final round ===
Semifinals
13 May
Azerbaijan	42
Uzbekistan	25
13 May
Turkey	34
Cameroon	18

Gold medal match
14 May
Azerbaijan	28
Turkey	26
Bronze medal match
14 May
Uzbekistan	27
Cameroon	35

==== Semifinals ====
13 May; 9:00	Azerbaijan	42–25	Uzbekistan	Sarhadchi Arena, Baku; Referees: Hussein, Imran (IRQ)
13 May; 9:00	Burova 7	(24–13)	Khalmuratova 5	Sarhadchi Arena, Baku; Referees: Hussein, Imran (IRQ)
13 May; 9:00	3× (yellow card)	Report	2× (yellow card) 3× (suspension)	Sarhadchi Arena, Baku; Referees: Hussein, Imran (IRQ)

13 May; 13:30	Turkey	34–18	Cameroon	Sarhadchi Arena, Baku; Referees: Alpaidze, Berezkina (RUS)
13 May; 13:30	Özel 9	(16–7)	four players 3	Sarhadchi Arena, Baku; Referees: Alpaidze, Berezkina (RUS)
13 May; 13:30	2× (yellow card) 7× (suspension)	Report	3× (yellow card) 3× (suspension) 1× (red card)	Sarhadchi Arena, Baku; Referees: Alpaidze, Berezkina (RUS)

==== Bronze medal match ====
14 May; 13:30	Uzbekistan	27–35	Cameroon	Sarhadchi Arena, Baku; Referees: Alpaidze, Berezkina (RUS)
14 May; 13:30	Mustafaeva 7	(14–18)	Yotchoum 7	Sarhadchi Arena, Baku; Referees: Alpaidze, Berezkina (RUS)
14 May; 13:30	2× (yellow card) 4× (suspension)	Report	3× (yellow card) 7× (suspension)	Sarhadchi Arena, Baku; Referees: Alpaidze, Berezkina (RUS)

==== Gold medal match ====
14 May; 18:00	Azerbaijan	28–26	Turkey	Sarhadchi Arena, Baku; Referees: Florescu, Stoia (ROU)
14 May; 18:00	Chernyshkova 8	(14–11)	Özel 7	Sarhadchi Arena, Baku; Referees: Florescu, Stoia (ROU)
14 May; 18:00	3× (yellow card) 2× (suspension)	Report	3× (yellow card) 4× (suspension)	Sarhadchi Arena, Baku; Referees: Florescu, Stoia (ROU)
