= Aslı İskit =

Turkish handball player

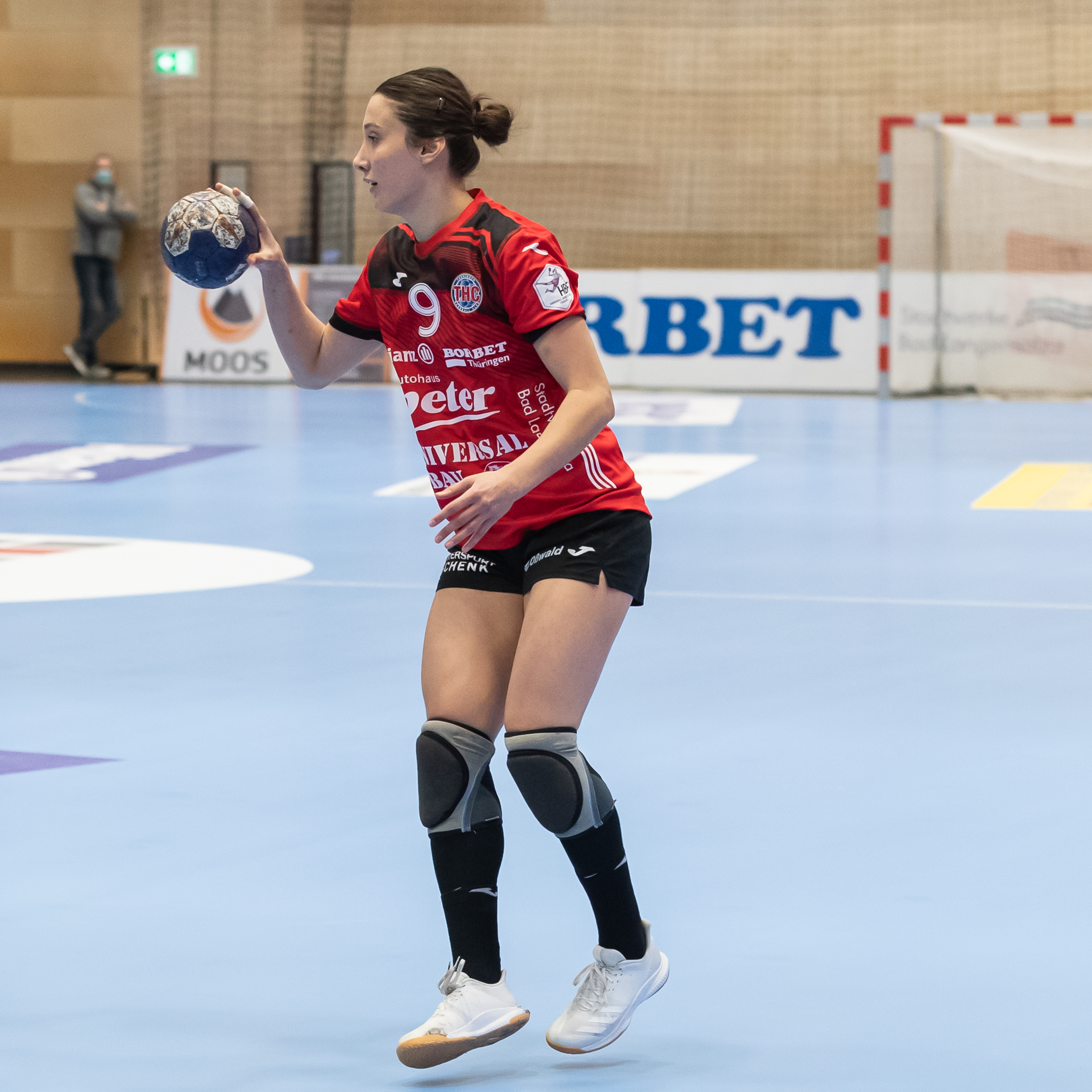
- Aslı İskit in October 2020

Personal information
- Full name: Aslı İskit Çalışkan
- Born: 7 December 1993 (age 32) Urla, İzmir, Turkey
- Height: 1.78 m (5 ft 10 in)

Sport
- Sport: Handball
- Position: Back
- Current club: Thüringer HC
- Number: 9

Youth career
- Years: Team
- 2004–2009: Urla GSK

Senior clubs
- Years: Team
- 2009–2014: İzmir BB SK
- 2014–2015: Ardeşen GSK
- 2015–2016: Muratpaşa Bld. SK
- 2016–2018: Kristianstad Handboll
- 2018–2020: Kastamonu Bld. GSK
- 2020–2022: Thüringer HC
National team
Years	Team	Apps	(Gls)
–	Turkey	72	(242)
Medal record
Representing Turkey
Women's Handball
Islamic Solidarity Games
Silver medal – second place	2017 Baku	Team
- Updated on December 2024

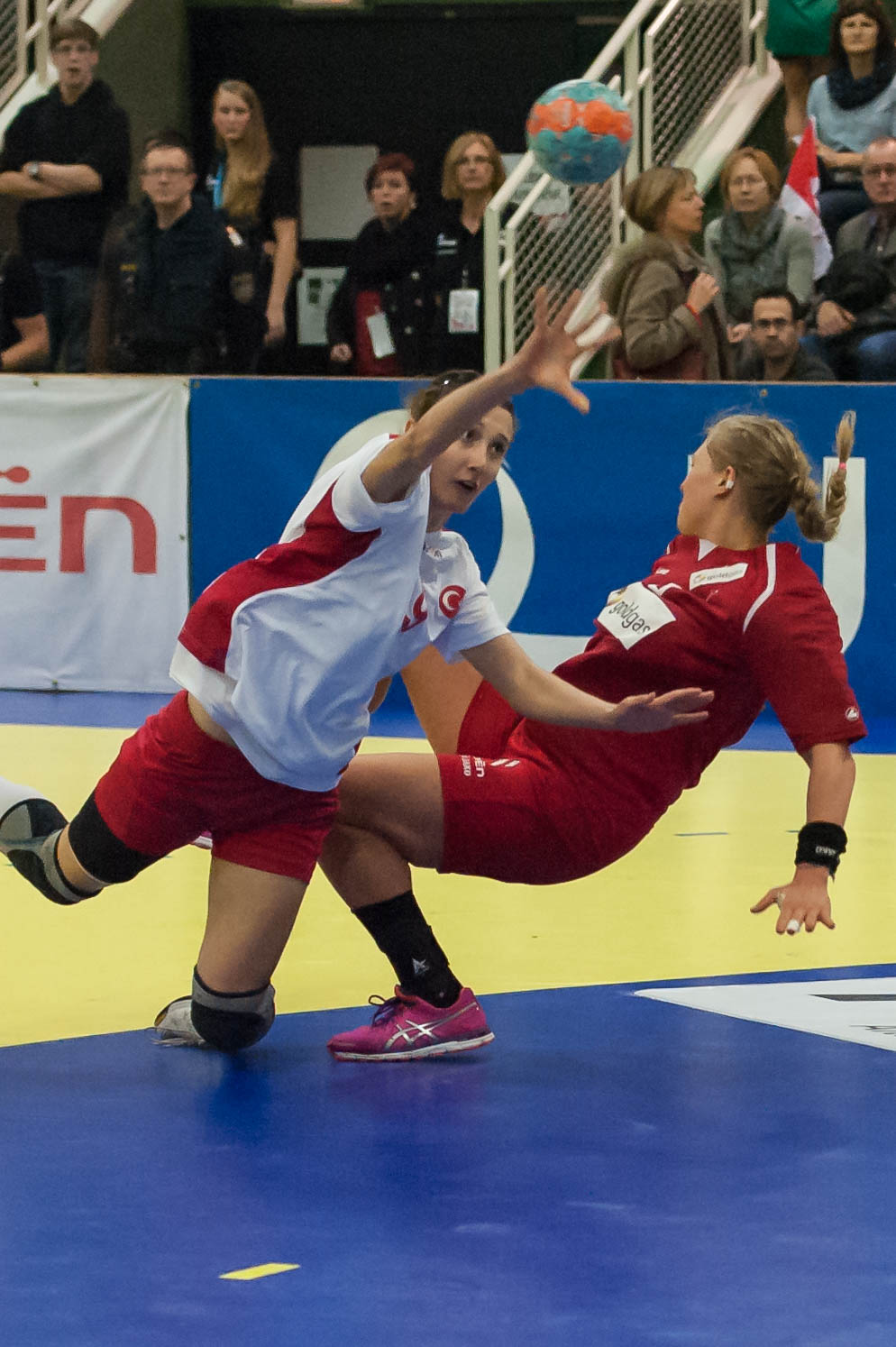
Aslı İskit (white/red) attacking Austria at the 2015 World Women's Handball Championship European qualification match.

Aslı İskit (born 7 December 1993), also known as Aslı İskit Çalışkan, is a Turkish handballer, who plays for Thüringer HC and the Turkey national team. She plays in the back position.

== Early years ==
Aslı İskit was born to sportspeople parents in Urla district of İzmir Province. She began playing handball at age 11, joining the local club Urla GSK.

== Club career ==
=== İzmir Büyükşehir Bld. SK ===
She began her sport career in 2009, joining İzmir Büyükşehir Belediyesi SK in her hometown, where she played five seasons until 2014. During this time, she took part twice in the Women's EHF Cup (2009–10 and 2010–11) and twice in the Women's EHF Cup Winners' Cup in 2011–12 and 2012–13.

With 161 goals, she was the top scorer of the 2012–13 season.

=== Ardeşen GSK ===
In the 2014–15 season, she was with the Rize-based team Ardeşen GSK. İskit participated in the Women's EHF Challenge Cup for Ardeşen GSK in 2014–15. She was among the cup's top scorers, however, she was disqualified due to unsporting behaviour at the Last 16 match and suspended for one game. During a 2014–15 league play-off match, she sustained a serious injury, and had to undergo surgery.

In November 2014, she was awarded "Best Playmaker of the Year" by the handball magazine.

=== Muratpaşa Bld. SK ===
İskit transferred for the 2015–16 season to Muratpaşa Bld. SK in Antalya. She played in the (2015–16 Women's EHF Cup) for her team.

=== Kristianstad Handboll ===
In 2016 İskit transferred to Kristianstad Handboll to play in the top division of women's handball in Sweden.

=== Kastamonu Bld. GSK ===
After returning to Turkey im 2018, İskit joined Kastamonu Bld. GSK, and played two seasons in the Turkish Women's Handball Super League.

=== Thüringer HC ===
In the beginning of June 2020, İskit signed a two-year contract with the German club Thüringer HC from Erfurt and Bad Langensalza to play in the Handball-Bundesliga. She was recognized as the third-best thrower and thus as a backspace player in the past unfinished 2019–20 EHF Cup season.

== International career ==
İskit became a member of Turkey girls' U-17 and U-19 teams. She played also for the Turkey women's national beach handball team at international competitions.

She plays for the Turkey women's national handball team. She was part of the national squad that competed at the 2013 Mediterranean Games, 2014 European Women's Handball Championship, and the 2015 World Women's Handball Championship – European qualification matches.

== Honours ==
=== Individual ===
- Best Playmaker – 2012–13 Turkish Women's Super League with İzmir BB SK.
- Top scorer – 2012–13 Turkish Women's Super League with İzmir BB SK.
- Top scorer – 2014–15 Turkish Women's Super League with Ardeşen GSK.

=== Club ===
Turkish Women's Handball Super League

Winners (1): 2018–19
Runners-up (1): 2010–11
Third place (1): 2015–16

=== International ===
Turkey women's national handball team

Islamic Solidarity Games
Silver medal (1): 2017
