= Sevilay İmamoğlu Öcal =

Turkish handball player (born 1984)

Sevilay İmamoğlu
Personal information
- Full name: Sevilay İmamoğlu Öcal
- Born: October 7, 1984 (age 42) Lüleburgaz, Kırklareli Province, Turkey
- Height: 1.76 m (5 ft 9 in)

Sport
- Sport: Handball
- Position: Goalkeeper
- Current club: Bursa BB
- Number: 1

Senior clubs
- Years: Team
- 2002–2003: Kastamonu Bld.
- 2003–2004: Üsküdar Bld.
- 2005–2006: Ankara Havelsan
- 2008–2011: İzmir BB
- 2011–2017: Muratpaşa Bld.
- 2018–2019: Polatlı Bld.
- 2020–2022: Yalıkavak
- 2022–2024: Konyaaltı Bld.
- 2024–: Bursa BB
National team
- Years: Team
- 1998–2022: Turkey
Medal record
Women's handball
Representing Turkey
Women's Handball
Islamic Solidarity Games
Silver medal – second place	2017 Baku	Team
Mediterranean Games
Silver medal – second place	2009 Pescara	Team
EHF Challenge Cup
Silver medal – second place	2011–12 Cup	Team
Turkish Women's Handball Super League
Gold medal – first place	2011–2012 Super League	Team
Gold medal – first place	2003–2004 Super League	Team

Sevilay İmamoğlu Öcal (born Sevilay İmamoğlu October 7, 1984 in Lüleburgaz, Kırklareli Province) is a Turkish retired handball goalkeeper who plays in the Super League for Bursa BB. She was a member of the Turkish national team. She studied physical education and sports at the Gazi University in Ankara.

== Club career ==
Before Sevilay Imamoğlu Öcal transferred to Muratpaşa Bld. at Antalya in July 2011, she played for Kastamonu Bld. (2002–03), where she began her professional career, Üsküdar Bld. (2003–04), Ankara Havelsan (2005–06) and İzmir BB (2008–2011). She was forced to move to the goalkeeper position, though she was previously playing as left winger at the Üsküdar Bld., when their goalkeeper left.

After leaving Muratpaşa Bld. in 2017, she played for Polatlı Bld. (2018–19), Yalıkavak (2020–2022) and Konyaaltı Bld. (2022–2024). For the 2024–25 season, she transferred to Bursa BB.

== International career ==
In 2017, she won the silver medal with the national team at the Islamic Solidarity Games in Baku, Azerbaycan.

In April 2022, Sevilay İmamoğlu Öcal retired from the national team after being their member for 24 years.

== Honours ==
=== Club ===
Turkish Women's Handball Super League

- 2003–04 (gold) with Üsküdar Bld.
- 2010–11 (silver) with İzmir BB
- 2011–12 (gold) with Muratpaşa Bld.
- 2012–13 (gold) with Muratpaşa Bld.
- 2013–14 (gold) with Muratpaşa Bld.
- 2014–15 (silver) with Muratpaşa Bld.
- 2015–16 (bronze) with Muratpaşa Bld.
- 2020–21 (silver) with Yalıkavak
- 2021–22 (silver) with Yalıkavak
- 2022–23 (silver) with Konyaaltı Bld.
- 2023–24 (bronze) with Konyaaltı Bld.
- 2024–25 (bronze) with Bursa BB

Turkish Women's Handball Super Cup

- 2012 (gold) with Muratpaşa Bşd.
- 2013 (gold) with Muratpaşa Bşd.
- 2014 (silver) with Muratpaşa Bşd.
- 2015 (silver) with Muratpaşa Bşd.
- 2018 (silver) wit Polatlı Bld.
- 2022 (silver) with Konyaaltı
- 2025 (gold) with Bursa BB

Turkish Women's Handball Cup

- 2011–12 (gold) with Muratpaşa Bld.
- 2013–14 (gold) with Muratpaşa Bld.
- 2014–15 (silver) with Muratpaşa Bld.
- 2016–17 (silver) with Muratpaşa Bld.
- 2023–24 (gold) with Konyaaltı Bld.
- 2024–25 (gold) with Bursa BB

=== International ===
Mediterranean Games
2009 (silver)

Women's EHF Challenge Cup

- 2011–12 (silver)

Islamic Solidarity Games
Silver medal (1): 2017

=== Individual ===
- 2005 Mediterranean Games – Top Goalkeeper
