= Betül Yılmaz =

Turkish handball player (born 1988)

Personal information
- Nationality: Turkish
- Born: 31 October 1988 (age 38) Ümraniye, Istanbul, Turkey
- Height: 1.78 m (5 ft 10 in)

Sport
- Sport: Handball
- Position: Left back
- Current club: Kastamonu
- Number: 21

Senior clubs
- Years: Team
- 2005–2013: Üsküdar Bld. SK
- 2013–2014: Muratpaşa Bld. SK
- 2015–2018: Zağnos SK
- 2018: Polatlı Bld. SK
- 2019–: Kastamonu Bld. GSK
National team
- Years: Team
- –: Turkey
Medal record
Representing Turkey
Women's handball
Mediterranean Games
Silver medal – second place	2009 Pescara	Team
Islamic Solidarity Games
Gold medal – first place	2025 Riyadh	Team
Gold medal – first place	2021 Konya	Team

Betül Yılmaz (born 31 October 1988 in Ümraniye, Istanbul) is a Turkish handballer who plays in left back position. She is a member of the Turkey national team.

== Early life ==
Betül Yılmaz was born in Ümraniye, Istanbul, Turkey on 31 October 1988. She was educated in physical education and sports at Kocaeli University.

== Club career ==
Yılmaz is 1.78 m (5 ft 10 in) tall at 62 kg (137 lb).

=== Üsküdar Bld. SK ===
From 2005 and 2013, she was a member of Üsküdar Bld. SK in Istanbul.

She played in the EHF Challenge Cup in 2005–06, 2006–07, 2012–13, and EHF Cup in 2007–08, 2008–09, as well as in the EHF Cup Winners' Cup in 2009–10, 2010–11, 2011–12, and the 2011–12 EHF Champions League. Her team finished in the third place in the 2012–13 Women's EHF Challenge Cup.

=== Muratpaşa Bld. SK ===
For the 2013–14 Turkish Super League season, she moved to Antalya, and joined Muratpaşau Bld. SK. She played in the EHF Cup Winners' Cup 2013/14, and the 2013–14 EHF Champions League.

=== Zağnos SK ===
In May 2015, she transferred to Zağnos SK in Trabzon. She appeared in the EHF Challenge Cup in 2016–17, and 2017–18.

=== Polatlı Bld. SK ===
She then joined to Polatlı SK of Ankara in the first half of the 2018–19 season. In the second half, she transferred to Kastamonu Bld. GSK. She ttok part in the 2018–19 EHF Challenge Cup for her team.

=== Kastamonu Bld. GSK ===
From the beginning of the 2018–19 Turkish Super League season's second half, she has been with Kastamonu Bld. GSK. She played in the EHF Champions League in 2019–20, 2021–22, and 2022–23, as well as in the 2019–20 EHF Cup, and EHF European League.

== International career ==
In 2022, she was part of the national team that became champions in the 5th Islamic Solidarity Games in Konya, Turkey.

She played in the national team, which won the gold medal at the 2025 Islamic Solidarity Games in Riyadh, Saudi Arabia.

== Honours ==
=== Club ===
Turkish Women's Handball Super League

Üsküdar Bld. SK

Champions (1): 2010–11.
Runners-up (5): 2007–08, 2008–09, 2009–10, 2011–12, 2012–13.
Third place (1): 2006–07.

Kastamonu Bld. GSK
Champions(4): 2018–19, 2020–21, 2021,+-22, 2022–23.

Women's Handball Turkish Cup

Üsküdar Bld. SK
Champions (1): 2008–09.
Third place (1): 2007–08.

=== International ===
Turkey women's national handball team

Mediterranean Games
Silver medal (1): 2091

Islamic Solidarity Games
Gold medal (2): 2021, 2025
