= Seda Yörükler =

Turkish handball player

Personal information
- Nationality: Turkish
- Born: 28 May 1984 (age 42) Bornova, İzmir Province, Turkey
- Height: 185 cm (6 ft 1 in)

Sport
- Sport: Handball
- Position: Left back
- Current club: İzmir B.B. SK

Senior clubs
- Years: Team
- 2000–present: İzmir B.B. SK
National team
- Years: Team
- –: Turkey
Medal record
Women's handball
Turkish Women's Super League
Silver medal – second place	2010–11	Team
Bronze medal – third place	2007–08	Team

Seda Yörükler (born 28 May 1984) is a Turkish female handballer playing in left back position. The 185 cm (6 ft 1 in) tall sportswoman at 78 kg (172 lb) is a member of the Turkish national team.

Yörükler has played for İzmir Büyükşehir Belediyespor since 2000.

== Achievements ==
=== National ===
- 2007–08 İzmir Büyükşehir Belediyespor TWHSL Bronze
- 2010–11 İzmir Büyükşehir Belediyespor TWHSL Silver

Legend:

- TWHSL Turkish Women's Handball Super League
