= David Ginesta Montes =

Spanish handball coach (born 1987)

Personal information
- Nationality: Spanish
- Born: 26 June 1987 (age 39) Spain

Sport
- Sport: Handball

Senior clubs
- Years: Team
- 2004–201?: Fraikin Granollers

Teams managed
- ?–?: Fraikin Granollers (assistant)
- 2021–2023: Rapid București (assistant)
- 2023–2025: Rapid București
- 01/2025–: Turkey women's
- 2025–: Ankara Yurdum

David Ginesta Montes (born 26 June 1987) is a Spanish handball coach who is currently coaching the Turkey women's national team, as well as Turkish Super League team Ankara Yurdum.

== Playing career ==
Ginesta Montes played in his country for Fraikin Granollers in the years 2004–2006 and 2017–2019. He enjoyed his team's champions title of the Spanish Juniors Championships four times and runners-up title twice. His team finished the 2017–18 Liga ASOBAL season at third place. The next season, they played the semifinals at the Copa del Rey ("King's Cup"). He was part of the team at the group stage matches of the 2018–19 EHF Cup. In the 2019–20 Copa del Rey, he played in the quarterfinals.

== Managerial career ==
=== Rapid București ===
Ginesta Montes was appointed head coach of the Romanian women's handball club Rapid București in the 2021–22 Liga Națională season. He helped the team become league champions at the end of the season, and play in the Final Four in the Cupa României. He continued coaching in the following three seasons. His team played quarterfinals in the 2022–23 Women's EHF Champions League. His team played at the 2022–23 Women's EHF Champions League knockout stage, group stage matches of the 2023–24 Women's EHF Champions League and 2024–25 Women's EHF Champions League. Under his management, Rapid București was able to advance to the 2024–25 Women's EHF Champions League knockout stage.

=== Turkey women's national team ===
Mid January 2025, the Turkish Handball Federation announced that Ginesta Montes was appointed head coach of the women's national team.

== Honours ==
=== Player ===
Fraikin Granollers

Liga ASOBAL
Third places (1): 2017–18

Copa del Rey
Semifinals (1): 2018–19

=== Coach ===
Rapid București

Liga Națională
Champions (1): 2021–22

Cupa României
Final Four (1): 2021–22
