= Ümmügülsüm Bedel =

Turkish handball player

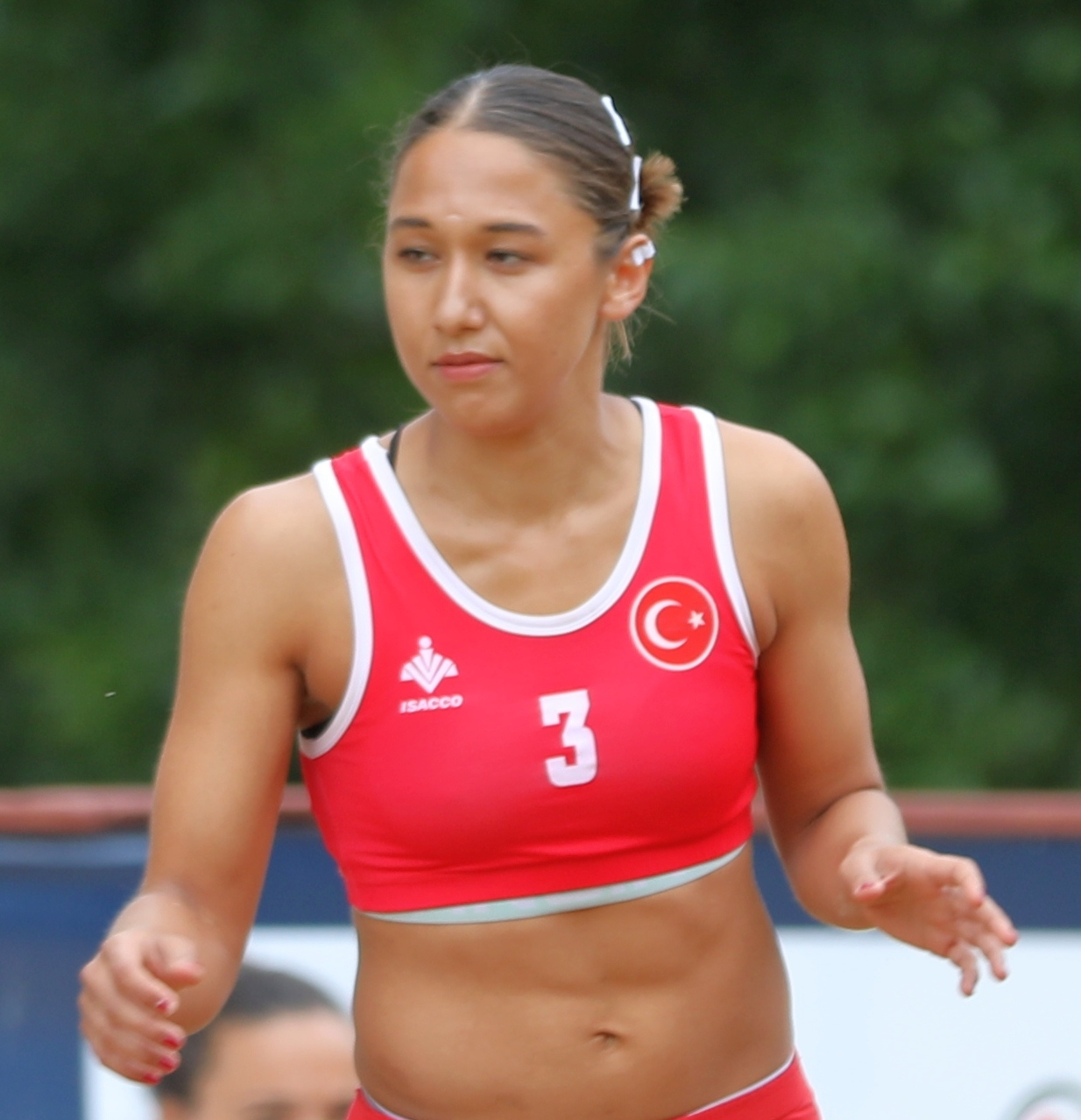
- Ümmügülsüm Bedel of Turkey women's national beach handball team at the 2019 European Beach Handball Championship.

Personal information
- Born: 8 February 1995 (age 31) Muğla, Turkey

Sport
- Sport: Handball
- Position: Left wing
- Current club: İzmir BB
- –: Turkey
- –: Turkey beach
Medal record
Women's Handball
Representing Turkey
Islamic Solidarity Games
Gold medal – first place	2025 Riyadh	Team
Silver medal – second place	2017 Baku	Team

Ümmügülsüm Bedel (born 8 February 1995) is a Turkish handballer, who plays in the Turkish Women's Handball Super League for İzmir BB, the Turkey national handball team, and the Turkey national beach handball team. She plays in the left wing position.

== International career ==
At the 2017 Islamic Solidarity Games held in Baku, Azerbaijan, Bedel played for Turkey's national team, which ended as runners-up.

She played in the national team, which won the gold medal at the 2025 Islamic Solidarity Games in Riyadh, Saudi Arabia.

== Honours ==
=== International ===
Turkey women's national handball team

Islamic Solidarity Games

Champions (1): 2025
Runners-up (1): 2017
