= Beyza İrem Türkoğlu =

Turkish handball player (born 1997)

Personal information
- Full name: Beyza Irem Türkoglu
- Nationality: Turkish
- Born: 4 February 1997 (age 29) Altındağ, Turkey
- Height: 1.73 m (5 ft 8 in)

Sport
- Sport: Handball
- Position: Left wing
- Current club: SCM Gloria Buzău
- Number: 25

Youth career
- Years: Team
- 2009–2014: Yenimahalle Bld. SK

Senior clubs
- Years: Team
- 2014–2019: Yenimahalle Bld. SK
- 2019–2021: Kastamonu Bld. GSK
- 2021–2023: Team Esbjerg
- 2023-2023 (Dec.): Konyaaltı Bld. SK
- Jan. 2024-July 2024: MKS Lublin
- 2024-: SCM Gloria Buzău
National team
- Years: Team
- 2017–: Turkey
Medal record
Representing Turkey
Women's Handball
Islamic Solidarity Games
Silver medal – second place	2017 Baku	Team

Beyza İrem Türkoğlu (born 4 February 1997) is a Turkish handballer, who plays as centre back for Danish club Team Esbjerg in the Bambusa Kvindeligaen, and for the Turkey national team.

== Club career ==
Türkoğlu has played seven seasons for Yenimahalle Bld. SK in her hometown, and transferred later to Kastamonu Bld. GSK in the Turkish Super League, where she was for three seasons.

On 27 May 2021, it was announced that she had signed a one-year deal with Team Esbjerg, leaving Kastamonu Bld. GSK. Her team represented Denmark at the 2021–22 Women's EHF Champions League, and placed fourth. End 2021, the Team Esbjerg extended her contract for two years until 30 June 2024. Her team reached the final four at the 2022–23 Women's EHF Champions League.

== International career ==
Türkoğlu is a member of the Turkey national team. In 2017, she won the silver medal with the national team at the Islamic Solidarity Games in Baku, Azerbaijan. She played in the national team at the 2022 Mediterranean Games in Oran, Algeria. She took part at the 2022 European Championship qualification.

== Honours ==
=== Club ===
Turkish Super League
Yenimahalle Bld. SK

Winners (1): 2014–15
Runners-up (1): 2016–17

Kastamonu Bld. GSK

Winners (1): 2020–21

Danish League

Team Esbjerg'

Winners (1): 2022–23
Runners-up (1): 2021–22

=== International ===
Turkey women's national handball team

Islamic Solidarity Games
Silver medal (1): 2017
