= Fatma Ay =

Turkish women's handballer (born 1992)

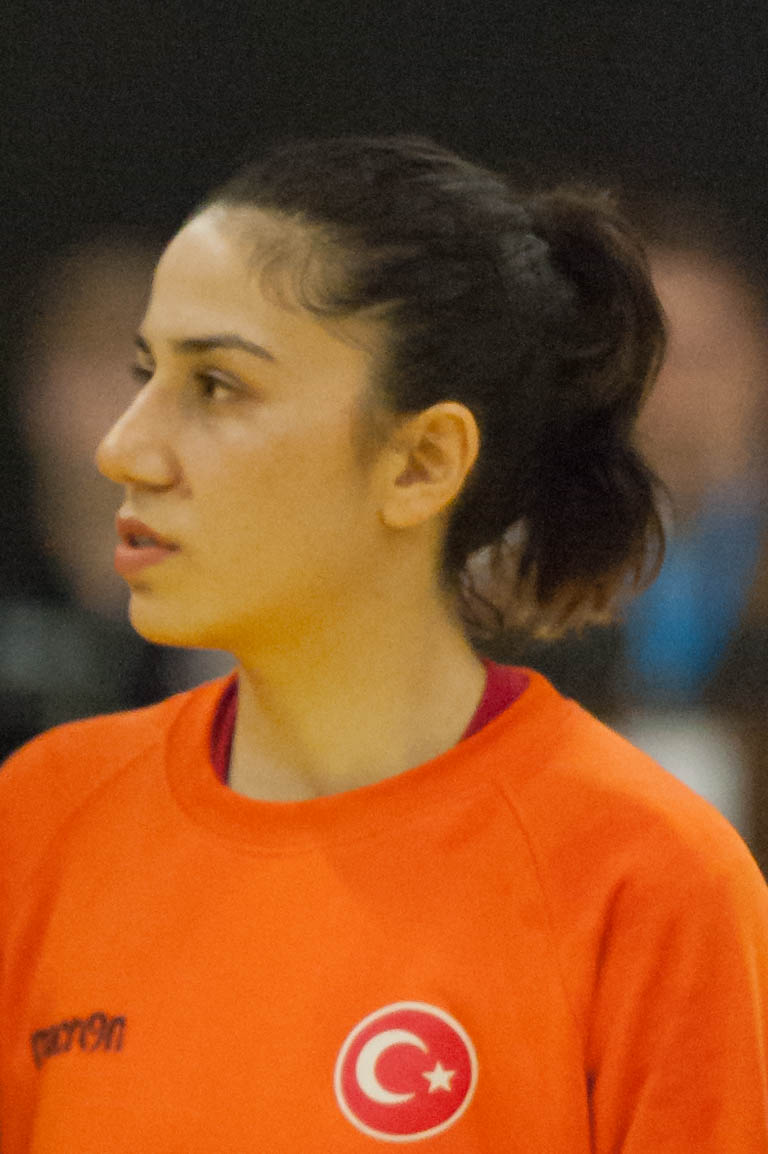
- Fatma Ay at the 2015 World Women's Handball Championship qualification.

Personal information
- Born: May 1, 1992 (age 34) Afyonkarahisar, Turkey
- Height: 1.75 m (5 ft 9 in)

Sport
- Sport: Handball
- Position: Goalkeeper
- Current club: Muratpaşa Bld. SK
- Number: 16
National team
- Years: Team
- –: Turkey

Fatma Ay (born May 1, 1992) is a Turkish women's handballer, who plays in the Turkish Women's Handball Super League for Muratpaşa Bld. SK, and the Turkey national team. The 1.75 m (5 ft 9 in)-tall sportswoman is a goalkeeper.

== Playing career ==
=== Club ===
Fatma Ay joined Antalya-based Muratpaşa Bld. SK in 2010.

She took part in the Women's EHF Challenge Cup matches in 2010–11 and 2011–12, which her team finished both as runner-up. She played in the Women's EHF Cup Winners' Cup matches (2012–13 and 2013–14), at the Women's EHF Champions League competitions (2012–13 and 2013–14) as well as at the Women's EHF Cup games (2014–15 and 2015–16).

== International ==
In 2009, Fatna Ay was called up to the Turkey women's national beach handball team.

She is a member of the Turkey women's national handball team. She took part in the 2014 European Women's Handball Championship qualification matches.

== Honours ==
Turkish Handball Super League

- Winners (3): 2011–12, 2012–13, 2013–14.
- Runner-up (1): 2014–15.
- Third place (1): 2010–11.
