= Gonca Nahcıvanlı =

Turkish handball player

Personal information
- Born: June 29, 1979 (age 47) İzmir, Turkey
- Height: 1.80 m (5 ft 11 in)

Sport
- Sport: Handball
- Position: Line player
- Current club: İzmir BB GSK
- Number: 5

Youth career
- Years: Team
- 1994–1997: Raks SK

Senior clubs
- Years: Team
- 1997–1999: Anadolu Üniversitesi GSK
- 2000–2001: Türk Telekom SK
- 2002–2003: TMO SK
- 2003–2005: Anadolu Üniversitesi GSK
- 2005–2007: Kometal Gjorče Petrov
- 2008–2011: İzmir BB GSK
- 2011–2013: Muratpaşa Bld. SK
- 2013–: İzmir BB GSK
National team
- Years: Team
- –: Turkey
Medal record
Women's Handball
Representing Turkey
Islamic Solidarity Games
Silver medal – second place	2017 Baku	Team
Mediterranean Games
Silver medal – second place	2009 Pescara	Team

Gonca Nahcıvanlı (born June 29, 1979) is a Turkish women's handballer who plays in the Turkish Women's Handball Super League for İzmir Büyükşehir Belediyesi GSK, and the Turkey national team. The 1.80 m (5 ft 11 in)-tall sportswoman is line player.

== Club career ==
Gonca Nahcıvanlı began her handball career in 1994 at the club Raks in her hometown İzmir.

She was with Anadolu Üniversitesi GSK (1997–1999 and 2003–2005), Türk Telekom SK (2000–2001), TMO SK (2002–2003), İzmir BB GSK (2008–2011) and Muratpaşa Bld. SK (2012–2013) before she returned to her hometown club İzmir BB GSK in 2013. Between 2005 and 2007, she played two seasons in Macedonia for the Skopje-based team Kometal Gjorče Petrov. She is the captain of the team.

She has won four league championship titles, with TMO SK (2002–03), Kometal Gjorče Petrov (2005–06 and 2006–07) as well as with Muratpaşa Bld. SK (2011–12).

Nahcıvanlı took part in the Women's EHF Cup Winners' Cup (1997–98, 1998–99 and 2012–13), the Women's EHF Cup (2001–02, 2002–03, 2004–05, 2009–10 and 2010–11), the Women's EHF Champions League (2002–03, 2005–06 and 2006–07) as well as the Women's EHF Challenge Cup (2003–04, 2008–09, 2011–12, 2014–15 and 2015–16).

=== International career ===
She plays in the Turkey women's national handball team. She was part of the silver medal-winning national team at the 2009 Mediterranean Games held in Pescara, Italy. She played in the 2010 European Women's Handball Championship qualification matches. In 2017, she won the silver medal with the national team at the Islamic Solidarity Games in Baku, Azerbaijan.

Beach handball

She played in the national team, which took part in the 2010 Beach Handball World Championships in Antalya, Turkey. Nahcıvanlı took part in the 2013 European Women's Beach Handball Championship.

== Honours ==
=== Club ===
Turkish Women's Handball Super League

- Winners (4): 2002–03, 2005–06, 2006–07, 2011–12.
- Runner-up (1): 2010–11.

=== International ===
Mediterranean Games

Winner (1): 2009.

Islamic Solidarity Games

Winner (1): 2017
