= Esra Gündar =

Turkish handball player (born 1980)

Personal information
- Born: 23 May 1980 (age 46) Ankara, Turkey
- Height: 1.68 m (5 ft 6 in)

Sport
- Sport: Handball
- Position: Left wing
- Current club: Yenimahalle Bld. SK
- Number: 6
National team
- Years: Team
- –: Turkey
Medal record
Women's Handball
Representing Turkey
Islamic Solidarity Games
Silver medal – second place	2017 Baku	Team
Mediterranean Games
Silver medal – second place	2009 Pescara	Team

Esra Gündar (born 23 May 1980) is a Turkish handballer who plays for Yenimahalle Bld. SK and the Turkey women's national team.

== Club career ==
She played for T.M.O. Ankara (1997–2003), Havelsan SK (2004–2006), Çankaya Belediyespor (2007–2008) and Maliye Milli Piyango SK (2008–2011) before she transferred in 2014 to Yenimahalle Bld. SK.

== International career ==
She is a member of the Turkey national team. In 2017, she won the silver medal with the national team at the Islamic Solidarity Games in Baku, Azerbaijan.
