= Derya Tınkaoğlu =

Turkish handball player

Personal information
- Born: 3 April 1988 (age 38) Kastamonu, Turkey
- Height: 1.78 m (5 ft 10 in)

Sport
- Sport: Handball
- Position: Goalkeeper
- Current club: İzmir Büyükşehir Bld. SK
- Number: 35

Senior clubs
- Years: Team
- 2003–2004: Kastamonu Bld. GSK
- 2007–2008: Üsküdar Bld. SK
- 2008–2011: İzmir Büyükşehir Bld. SK
- 2011–2012: Maliye Milli Piyango SK
- 2012–2013: Çankaya Bld. Anka SK
- 2013–2014: Muratpaşa Bld. SK
- 2014–: İzmir Büyükşehir Bld. SK
National team
- Years: Team
- –: Turkey
Medal record
Mediterranean Games
Silver medal – second place	2009 Pescara	Team

Derya Tınkaoğlu (born 3 April 1988) is a Turkish women's handballer, who plays in the Turkish Women's Handball Super League for İzmir Büyükşehir Belediyesi SK, and the Turkey national team. The 1.78 m (5 ft 10 in)-tall sportswoman plays as a goalkeeper.

== Playing career ==
=== Club ===
Derya Tinkaoğlu began her handball career in 2004 at Kastamonu Bld. GSK in her hometown. After one season with the Istanbul-based club Üsküdar Bld. SK in 2007–08, she transferred to İzmir Büyükşehir Bld. SK, where she was until 2011. She played then for Maliye Milli Piyango SK, Çankaya Bld. Anka SK in Ankara and Muratpaşa Bld. SK in Antalya one season each. In the 2014–15 season, she returned to her former team İzmir Büyükşehir Belediyesi SK.

Tinkaoğlu took part at the Women's EHF Cup matches with Kastamonu Bld. GSK (2003–04), with Üsküdar Bld. SK (2007–08), with İzmir Büyükşehir Bld. SK (2009–10, 2010–11), with Maliye Milli Piyango SK (2011–12), with Çankaya Bld. Anka SK (2012–13). She played at the Women's EHF Champions League for Muratpaşa Bld. SK (2013–14). Further, she participated at the Women's EHF Cup Winners' Cup for Muratpaşa Bld. SK (EHF Women's Cup Winners' Cup 2013/14) and for İzmir Büyükşehir Bld. SK (2008–09, 2014–15 and 2015–16).

=== International ===
Tinkaoğlu played at the 2011 World Women's Handball Championship, 2012 European Women's Handball Championship qualification, and 2013 Mediterranean Games held in Antalya, Tıurkey.

She took part at the 2014 European Women's Handball Championship qualification, and 2016 European Women's Handball Championship qualification.

== Honours ==
Turkish Women's Handball Super League

- Winners (1): 2013–14
- Runners-up (2): 2010–11, 2007–08
- Third place (1): 2012–13
