= Turkey women's national handball team =

Turkey

Information
- Association: Turkey Handball Federation (THF)
- Coach: (Spain) David Ginesta Montes

Colours
1st	2nd	3rd

Results

European Championship
- Appearances: 1 (First in 2024)
- Best result: 20th (2024)
- Last updated on .

Turkey women's national handball team
Medal record

Mediterranean Games
Silver medal – second place	2009 Pescara	Team

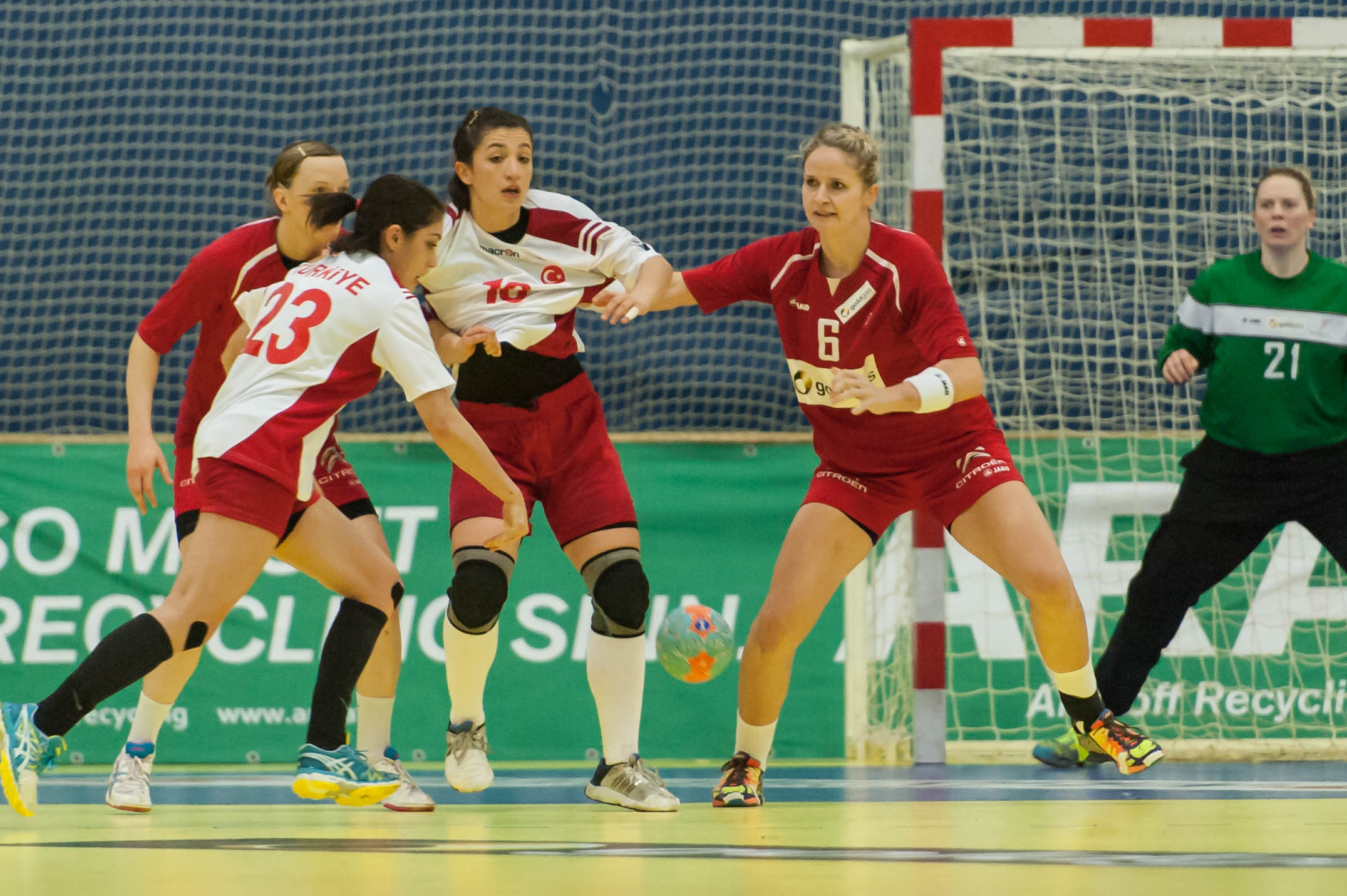
Turkey (white/red) vs Austria at the 2015 World Women's Handball Championship European qualification match.

The Turkey women's national handball team is the national handball team of Turkey for women and is managed by the Turkey Handball Federation.

The team achieved second place in Mediterranean Games in 2009 and championship in Islamic Solidarity Games in 2022. The team was coached by Costică Buceschi from Romania in 2023. In 2024, Turkey qualified for the country's first European Women's Handball Championship, a competition they would participate in as hosts in December 2026.

== Current squad ==
The preliminary extended squad for the 2026 European Women's Handball Championship.

Head coach: David Ginesta Montes

No.	Pos.	Name	Date of birth (age)	Height	App.	Goals	Club
1	GK	Selen Akalın	25 August 1998 (age 28)	1.71 m	1	0	(Turkey) Üsküdar Belediyespor
7	RB	Edanur Burhan	11 October 1999 (age 27)	1.70 m	7	3	(Turkey) Yalıkavak SK
8	P	Cansu Akalın	25 August 1998 (age 28)	1.85 m	10	5	(Turkey) Bursa BBSK
10	CB	Gülcan Tügel	10 July 2000 (age 26)	1.73 m	18	43	(Turkey) Yalıkavak SK
11	RB	Döne Gül Bozdoğan	3 February 1999 (age 27)	1.72 m	30	43	(Turkey) MC Sistem Yozgat GSK
13	RW	Bilgenur Öztürk	16 June 1999 (age 27)	1.71 m	4	24	(Turkey) Üsküdar Belediyespor
14	P	Nurceren Akgün Göktepe	20 June 1992 (age 34)	1.80 m	72	127	(Turkey) MC Sistem Yozgat GSK
16	LB	Buğu Sönmez	1 January 2006 (age 20)	1.82 m	8	16	(Turkey) Manisa Büyükşehir Belediyespor
17	LW	Ceylan Aydemir	15 August 1998 (age 28)	1.71 m	14	20	(Turkey) Yalıkavak SK
18	GK	Yağmur Bembeyaz	25 June 1999 (age 27)	1.83 m	9	0	(Turkey) Bursa BBSK
19	CB	Yağmur Özler	17 September 2001 (age 25)	1.76 m	7	14	(Turkey) Üsküdar Belediyespor
22	RW	Emine Gökdemir	1 February 2003 (age 23)	1.63 m	18	27	(Turkey) Bursa BBSK
23	LW	Berinda Tükenmez	23 November 2002 (age 23)	1.70 m	0	0	(Denmark) Rødovre HK
25	P	Hatice Özdemir	26 June 2000 (age 26)	1.78 m	2	0	(Turkey) Odunpazarı S.K.
26	LW	Beyzanur Türkyılmaz	29 August 2001 (age 25)	1.67 m	6	12	(Turkey) Bursa BBSK
28	GK	Yaren Göker	5 November 1999 (age 27)	1.75 m	2	0	(Turkey) Göztepe S.K.
35	LB	Sude Dağ	30 May 2004 (age 22)	1.80 m	4	5	(Turkey) Göztepe S.K.
38	RB	Azra Öztürk	16 March 2007 (age 19)	1.82 m	0	0	(Turkey) Üsküdar Belediyespor
41	RB	Gazel Dikme	9 December 2009 (age 16)	1.75 m	0	0	(Turkey) Manisa Büyükşehir Belediyespor
47	P	Büşra Işıkhan	1 January 1999 (age 27)	1.76 m	8	2	(Turkey) Manisa Büyükşehir Belediyespor
53	LB	Ayşenur Sormaz	10 May 2000 (age 26)	1.78 m	0	0	(Turkey) Bursa BBSK
71	LB	Hande Muhcu	4 August 2006 (age 20)	1.85 m	0	0	(Turkey) Odunpazarı S.K.

== Notable former members ==
=== Coaches ===
- (Hungary) Péter Kovács (born 1955), head coach (2007-2010)

=== Players ===
- Fatma Akgün (born 1988)
- Fatma Ay (born 1992)
- Sevilay İmamoğlu Öcal (born 1984)
- Serpil İskenderoğlu (born 1982)
- Gonca Nahcıvanlı (born 1979)
- Çiğdem Özcan (born 1984)
- Esra Öztürk (born 1988)
- Burcu Pirinçci (born 1990)
- Seda Yörükler (born 1984)
- Yeliz Özel (born 1980)
- Esin Sağdıç (born 1988)

== Competitive record ==
=== World Championship ===
Year	Position	Pld	W	D	L	GS	GA	+/–
(Socialist Federal Republic of Yugoslavia) 1957	Did not qualify							
(Romania) 1962	Did not qualify							
(West Germany) 1965	Did not qualify							
(Netherlands) 1971	Did not qualify							
(Socialist Federal Republic of Yugoslavia) 1973	Did not qualify							
(Soviet Union) 1975	Did not qualify							
(Czechoslovakia) 1978	Did not qualify							
(Hungary) 1982	Did not qualify							
(Netherlands) 1986	Did not qualify							
(South Korea) 1990	Did not qualify							
(Norway) 1993	Did not qualify							
(Hungary) 1995	Did not qualify							
(Germany) 1997	Did not qualify							
(Norway) 1999	Did not qualify							
(Italy) 2001	Did not qualify							
(Croatia) 2003	Did not qualify							
(Russia) 2005	Did not qualify							
(France) 2007	Did not qualify							
(China) 2009	Did not qualify							
(Brazil) 2011	Did not qualify							
(Serbia) 2013	Did not qualify							
(Denmark) 2015	Did not qualify							
(Germany) 2017	Did not qualify							
(Japan) 2019	Did not qualify							
(Spain) 2021	Did not qualify							
(Denmark) (Norway) (Sweden) 2023	Did not qualify							
(Germany) (Netherlands) 2025	Did not qualify							
(Hungary) 2027	To be determined							
(Spain) 2029	To be determined							
(Czech Republic) (Poland) 2031	To be determined							
Total	0/30	0	0	0	0	0	0	0

=== European Championship ===
European Women's Handball Championship

Year	Round	Position	GP	W	D	L	GS	GA
(Germany) 1994	Did not qualify							
(Denmark) 1996	Did not qualify							
(Netherlands) 1998	Did not qualify							
(Romania) 2000	Did not qualify							
(Denmark) 2002	Did not qualify							
(Hungary) 2004	Did not qualify							
(Sweden) 2006	Did not qualify							
(North Macedonia) 2008	Did not qualify							
(Denmark) (Norway) 2010	Did not qualify							
(Serbia) 2012	Did not qualify							
(Hungary) (Croatia) 2014	Did not qualify							
(Sweden) 2016	Did not qualify							
(France) 2018	Did not qualify							
(Denmark) (Norway) 2020	Did not qualify							
(Slovenia) (North Macedonia) (Montenegro) 2022	Did not qualify							
(Austria) (Hungary) (Switzerland) 2024	Preliminary	20th	3	0	1	2	68	102
(Czech Republic) (Poland) (Romania) (Slovakia) (Turkey) 2026	Qualified as co-hosts							
(Denmark) (Norway) (Sweden) 2028	TBD							
(Belgium) (France) 2030	TBD							
(Denmark) (Germany) (Poland) 2032	TBD							
Total	2/20	–	3	0	1	2	68	102

=== Islamic Solidarity Games ===
Year	Host	Result	GP	W	D	L	GF	GA	GD
2005	(Saudi Arabia) Mecca	Did not participate							
2010	(Iran) Tehran	Cancelled							
2013	(Indonesia) Palembang	Not held							
2017	(Azerbaijan) Baku	2nd place, silver medalist(s)	5	3	0	2	152	125	+27
2021	(Turkey) Konya	1st place, gold medalist(s)	5	5	0	0	191	109	+82
2025	(Saudi Arabia) Riyadh	1st place, gold medalist(s)	5	5	0	0	143	112	+31
Total	3/6	–	15	13	0	2	486	346	+140

=== Mediterranean Games ===
Year	Host	Result	GP	W	D	L	GF	GA	GD
2001	(Tunisia) Tunis	5th	5	3	1	1	162	138	+24
2005	(Spain) Almeria	5th	4	2	0	2	152	146	+6
2009	(Italy) Pescara	2nd place, silver medalist(s)	6	5	0	1	190	154	+36
2013	(Turkey) Mersin	6th	5	2	0	3	119	137	-8
2018	(Spain) Tarragona	5th	5	3	0	2	148	149	-1
2022	(Algeria) Oran	5th	4	2	0	2	121	117	+4
Total	0/0	–	0	0	0	0	0	0	

=== Carpathian Trophy (women's handball) ===
1. 2024: 6th

== Former squads ==
- 2009 Mediterranean Games — (silver) Silver Medal
  Sevilay İmamoğlu, Öcal Serpil Çapar, Gonca Nahcıvanl, Yeliz Özel , Esra Öztürk, Yeliz Yılmaz, Senar Dayat, Yasemin Şahin, Serpil İskenderoğlu, Selma Pekmutlu, Betül Yılmaz, Sevda Akbulut, Esra Gündar, Fatma Atalar, Derya Tınkaoğlu
- 2017 Islamic Solidarity Games — (silver) Silver Medal
  Sevilay İmamoğlu Öcal, Esra Öztürk, Beyza İrem Türkoğlu, Gonca Nahcıvanlı, Yeliz Özel, Yeliz Yılmaz, Serpil İskenderoğlu, Nurceren Akgün, Derya Tınkaoğlu, Fatma Atalar, Yasemin Şahin, Aslı İskit, Ümmügülsüm Bedel, Olha Vashchuk
- 2021 Islamic Solidarity Games — (gold) Gold Medal
  Merve Durdu, Halime İslamoğlu, Kübra Sarıkaya, Elif Sıla Aydın, Emine Gökdemir, Bilgenur Öztürk, Neslihan Çalışkan, Betül Yılmaz, Ayşenur Sormaz, Yasemin Şahin, Gülcan Tügel, Beyza Karaçam, Merve Özbolluk, Cansu Akalın, Ceren Demirçelen, Meryem Erdoğan. Head coach:
- 2025 Islamic Solidarity Games — (gold) Gold Medal
  3 Seval Bozova, 7 Edanur Burhan, 10 Melike Kasapoğlu, 11 Zeynep Nur Kapaklıkaya, 12 Sude Karademir, i6 Buğu Sönmez, 20 Gülcan Tügel, 21 Halime Tuana Arslan, 25 Sude Çifçi, 28 Sümeyye Durdu, 45 Betül Yılmaz, 48 Ümmügülsüm Bedel, 84 Açelya Kaya, 87 Ceyhan Coşkunsu, 96 Sinem Vatan Güney, 99 Ceren Demirçelen. Head coach: (Spain) David Ginesta Montes
