= Morgane Ndongo =

Cameroonian handball player

Personal information
- Full name: Morgane Ndongo Adzomo
- Nationality: Cameroonian
- Born: 7 March 1993 (age 33)
- Height: 1.95 m (6 ft 5 in)

Sport
- Sport: Handball
- Position: Centre back
- Current club: FAP Yaoundé
National team
Years	Team	Apps
–	Cameroon	24

Morgane Ndongo Adzomo (born 7 March 1993) is a Cameroonian handball player for FAP Yaoundé and the Cameroonian national team.

She participated at the 2017 World Women's Handball Championship.
