= Amélie Goudjo =

French handball player (born 1980)

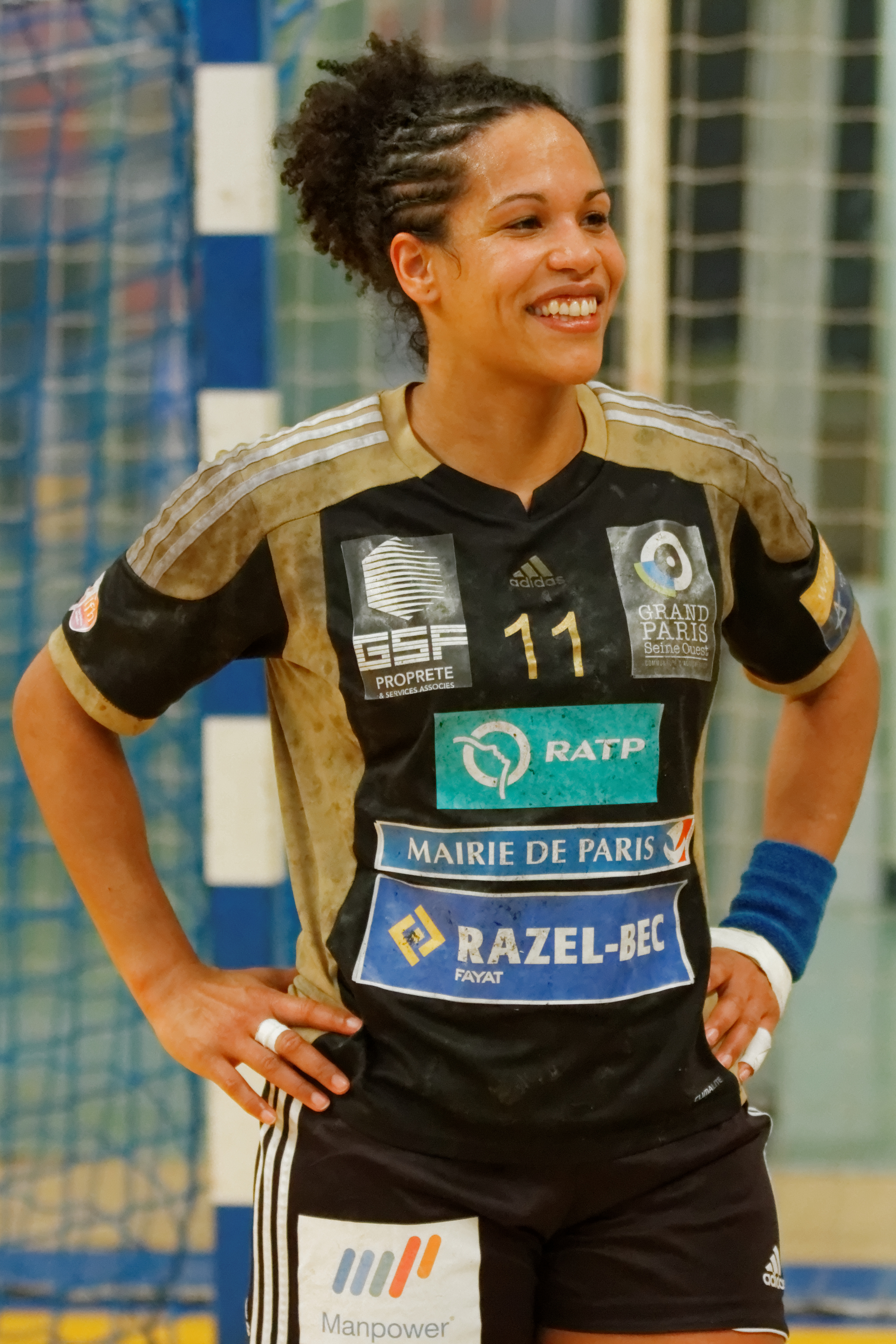

Personal information
- Nationality: French
- Born: 19 April 1980 (age 46) Nantua, France
- Height: 1.73 m (5 ft 8 in)

Sport
- Sport: Handball
- Position: Pivot

Senior clubs
- Years: Team
- 1998–2003: ASUL Vaulx-en-Velin
- 2003–2005: Toulon Var HB ASCM
- 2005–2007: CJF Fleury
- 2007–2008: Issy-les-Moulineaux HB
- 2008–2010: Akaba Bera Bera
- 2010–2014: Issy Paris Hand
- 2014–2015: RK Krim
National team
Years	Team	Apps	(Gls)
2005-2014	France	101	(123)
Medal record
World Championship
Silver medal – second place	2009 China	Team
Silver medal – second place	2011 Brazil	Team
Mediterranean Games
Gold medal – first place	2009 Pescara	Team

Amélie Goudjo (born 19 April 1980) is a former French handball player. She was member of the French national team.

She participated at the 2009 World Women's Handball Championship in China, winning a silver medal with the French team. She also represented France at the 2013 World Women's Handball Championship.
