= 2003–04 EHF Women's Cup Winners' Cup =

Handball competition

The 2003–04 EHF Women's Cup Winners' Cup was the 28th edition of EHF's competition for women's handball national cup champions. It returned to an autumn to spring calendar three years later, running from October 10, 2003, to May 21, 2004. The format was also altered, breaking the Rounds of 32 and 16 into three preliminary rounds, with the four remaining teams playing against the third-placed teams in the Champions League's group stage in the quarterfinals.

The final confronted two teams coming from the Champions League, with 2002 EHF Cup champion Ikast Bording beating 8-times Champions League champion Hypo Niederösterreich, overcoming an away loss by a 9-goals margin, to become the first Danish team to win the Cup Winners' Cup.

== Results ==
=== First preliminary round ===
Local team	Aggregate	Away team	1st leg	2nd leg
Eglė Vilnius (Lithuania)	41–54	(Croatia) Lokomotiva Zagreb	21–27	20–27
Fémina Visé (Belgium)	31–80	(Denmark) FC Copenhague	19–38	12–42
Union Korneuburg (Austria)	75–43	(Israel) Maccabi-K.S. Holon	40–24	35–19
Radnicki Belgrade (Serbia and Montenegro)	69–40	(Bosnia and Herzegovina) ŽRK Ilidza	32–19	37–21
LK Zug (Switzerland)	39–67	(Norway) Byåsen HE	22–35	17–32
Váci NKSE (Hungary)	71–48	(Greece) Ormi Patras	38–27	33–21
Üsküdar Bld. SK (Turkey)	59–53	(Italy) Florgarden Sassari	33–25	26–28
ABU Baku (Azerbaijan)	53–49	(Netherlands) Hellas Den Haag	23–24	30–25
Ferrobús Tortajada (Spain)	78–32	(Belarus) Arkatron Minsk	42–19	36–13
(a) CD Gil Eanes (Portugal)	40–40	(Poland) Zgoda Ruda Śląska	19–16	21–24
HC Bascharage (Luxembourg)	33–76	(Germany) Frankfurter HC	14–38	19–38

=== Final stages ===
Second preliminary round January 9–17, 2004
(Croatia) Lokomotiva Zagreb	26	23	49
(Denmark) FC Copenhague	24	28	52
(Austria) Union Korneuburg	18	17	35
(Russia) Luch Moscow	31	30	61
(France) Cercle Nîmes	29	28	57
(Serbia and Montenegro) Radnicki Belgrade	17	15	32
(Norway) Byåsen HE	17	23	40
(Hungary) Váci NKSE	31	32	63
(Ukraine) Spartak Kyiv	22	27	49
(Turkey) Üsküdar Bld. SK	26	30	56
(Azerbaijan) ABU Baku	15	22	37
(France) Metz HB	24	24	48
(Spain) Ferrobús Tortajada	36	35	71
(Portugal) CD Gil Eanes	21	22	43
(Romania) Silcotub Zalău	31	34	65
(Germany) Frankfurter HC	21	31	52

Third preliminary round February 14–21, 2004
(Denmark) FC Copenhague	34	18	52
(Russia) Luch Moscow	15	29	44
(France) Cercle Nîmes	21	23	44
(Hungary) Váci NKSE	24	24	48
(Turkey) Üsküdar Bld. SK	22	15	37
(France) Metz HB	33	31	64
(Spain) Ferrobús Tortajada	33	18	51
(Romania) Silcotub Zalău	19	27	46

Quarterfinals; March 12–21, 2004
(Spain) Elda Prestigio	20	25	45
(Denmark) FC Copenhague	28	33	61
(Austria) Hypo Niederösterreich	30	30	60
(Hungary) Váci NKSE	15	26	41
(Spain) Mar Valencia	21	28	49
(France) Metz HB	25	28	53
(Denmark) Ikast Bording	36	34	70
(Spain) Ferrobús Tortajada	26	30	56

Semifinals; April 17–24, 2004
(Denmark) FC Copenhague	27	24	51
(Austria) Hypo Niederösterreich	29	39	68
(France) Metz HB	23	25	48
(Denmark) Ikast Bording	21	34	55

Final; May 15–21, 2004
(Austria) Hypo Niederösterreich	35	22	57
(Denmark) Ikast Bording	30	36	66
