= Jasmine Yotchoum =

Cameroonian handball player

Personal information
- Nationality: Cameroonian
- Born: 2 December 1994 (age 31)
- Height: 1.86 m (6 ft 1 in)

Sport
- Sport: Handball
- Position: Pivot
- Current club: FAP Yaoundé
National team
| Years | Team | Apps |
| – | Cameroon | 18 |
Medal record
African Championship
| Silver medal – second place | 2021 Yaoundé |

Jasmine Yotchoum (born 2 December 1994) is a Cameroonian handball player for FAP Yaoundé and the Cameroonian national team.

She participated at the 2017 World Women's Handball Championship. At the 2021 African Championship she won silver medals, losing to Angola in the final.
