= Camille Ayglon =

French handball player (born 1985)

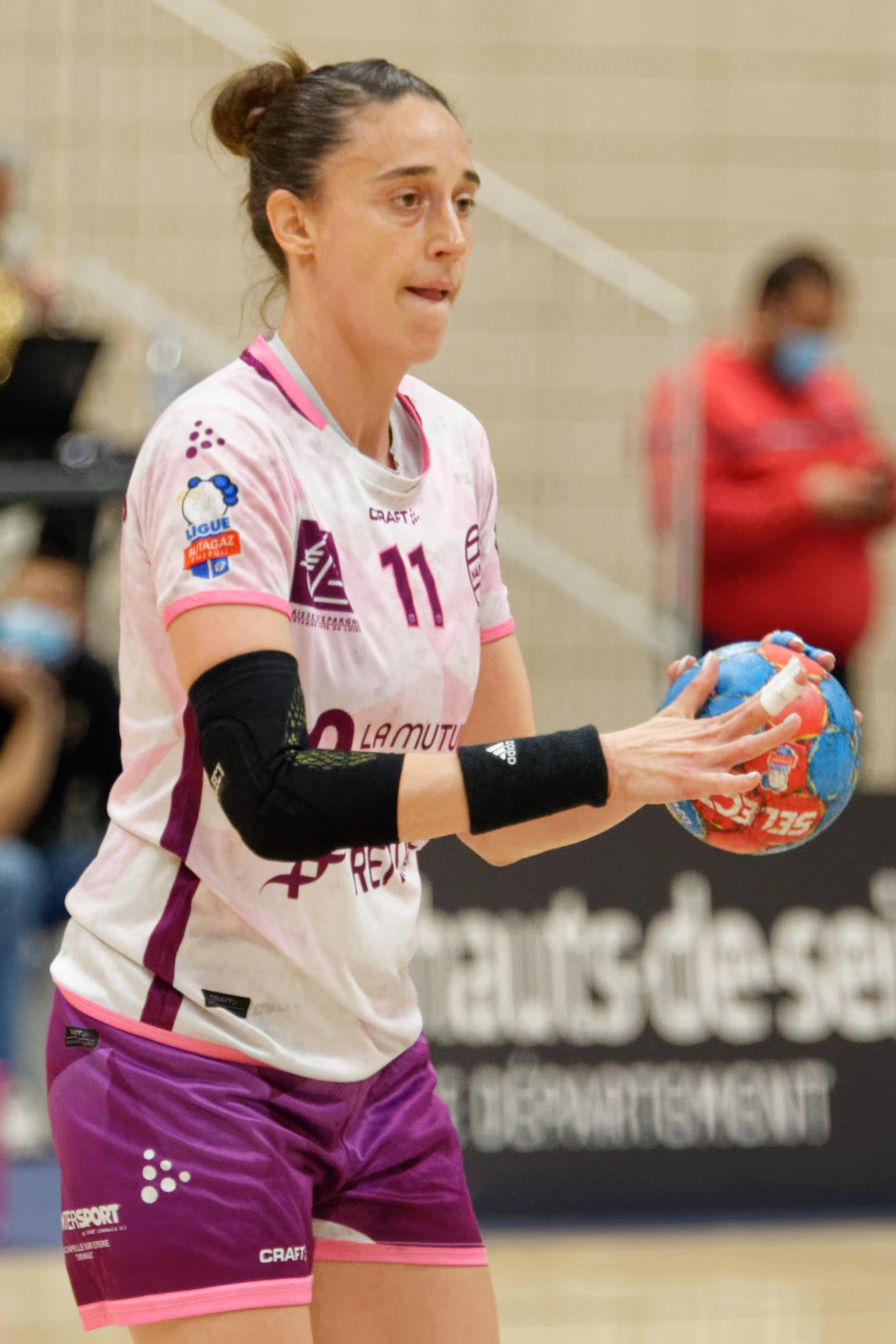
- Ayglon-Saurina in 2021

Personal information
- Full name: Camille Ayglon-Saurina
- Nationality: French
- Born: 21 May 1985 (age 41) Avignon, France
- Height: 1.80 m (5 ft 11 in)

Sport
- Sport: Handball
- Position: Right back

Senior clubs
- Years: Team
- 1999–2008: Handball Cercle Nîmes
- 2008–2010: Metz Handball
- 2010–2016: Handball Cercle Nîmes
- 2016–2018: CSM București
- 2018–2021: Nantes Handball
National team
Years	Team	Apps	(Gls)
2007–2021	France	270	(550)

Teams managed
- 2024-: French U20 Women
Medal record
Olympic Games
Silver medal – second place	2016 Rio de Janeiro	Team
World Championship
Gold medal – first place	2017 Germany
Silver medal – second place	2009 China
Silver medal – second place	2011 Brazil
European Championship
Gold medal – first place	2018 France
Bronze medal – third place	2016 Sweden
Mediterranean Games
Gold medal – first place	2009 Pescara	Team

Camille Ayglon-Saurina (née Camille Ayglon, 21 May 1985) is a French handball coach and former player who represented the French national team. She is a World Champions from 2017 and a European Champion from 2018. She also competed in the 2008, 2012, and 2016 Olympic Games.

On 1 December 2016, Ayglon-Saurina was awarded the rank of Chevalier (knight) of the French National Order of Merit.

== Career ==
Camille Ayglon started her career in 1999 at Handball Cercle Nîmes. Between 2008 and 2010 she played for Metz Handball, before returning to HBC Nîmes. With Metz she won the 2009 French championship, the 2010 French cup and 2009 and 2010 French league cup.

In 2016 she joined Romanian CSM București. Here she won the 2017 and 2018 Romanian league and cup double and came third in the EHF Champions League in both seasons.

In July 2018 she joined Nantes Loire Atlantique Handball. She retired after the 2020–21 season.

=== National team ===
Ayglon played for various French youth teams. She debuted for the French national team on 1 March 2007 against China.

At the 2016 Olympics she won a silver medal, losing to Russia in the final. A year later she won gold medals at the 2017 World Championship. In 2018 she won another gold medal, when France won the 2018 European Championship. This was the first time, France won the European Championship.

== Post-playing career ==
From September 2024 she became the assistant coach for the French women's youth national team.

== Honours ==
- Olympic Games:
  - Silver Medalist: 2016
- World Championship:
  - Gold Medalist: 2017
  - Silver Medalist: 2009, 2011
- European Championship:
  - Bronze Medalist: 2016
- Romanian Championship:
  - Winner: 2017, 2018
- Romanian Cup:
  - Winner: 2017, 2018
- Romanian Supercup:
  - Winner: 2016, 2017
- French Championship:
  - Winner: 2009
- French Cup:
  - Winner: 2010
  - Finalist: 2009, 2011, 2015
- French League Cup:
  - Winner: 2009, 2010
  - Finalist: 2013
- EHF Champions League:
  - Bronze Medalist: 2017, 2018
- EHF Challenge Cup:
  - Semifinalist: 2011

== Individual awards ==
- French Championship Best Right Back: 2010, 2011

== Personal life ==
She is married to Guillaume Saurina.
