= Yeliz Özel =

Turkish handball player (born 1980)

Personal information
- Born: 6 March 1980 (age 46) Ankara, Turkey
- Height: 1.77 m (5 ft 10 in)

Sport
- Sport: Handball
- Position: Centre Back
- Number: 7

Senior clubs
- Years: Team
- 1998–1999: PTT Türk Telekom SK
- 1999–2000: Byåsen HE
- 2000–2001: PTT Türk Telekom
- 2001–2002: Anadolu Üniversitesi GSK
- 2002–2004: Üsküdar Bld. SK
- 2004–2007: Kometal Skopje
- 2007–2010: Maliye Milli Piyango SK
- 2010–2012: CS Oltchim
- 2012–2013: Üsküdar Bld. SK
- 2013–2017: Yenimahalle Bld. SK
- 2017–2019: Muratpaşa
- 2019–2020: Kastamonu
- 2020–2021: Yalikavak SK
- 2021–: İzmir Büyükşehir Bld. GSK
- 2023–: Yalıkavak SK
National team
- Years: Team
- 1995–2022: Turkey
Medal record
Women's Handball
Representing Turkey
Islamic Solidarity Games
Silver medal – second place	2017 Baku	Team
Mediterranean Games
Silver medal – second place	2009 Pescara	Team
- Updated on 7 February 2023

Yeliz Özel (born 6 March 1980, in Ankara) is a Turkish retired handballer, who last played for İzmir Büyükşehir Bld. GSK and the Turkish national team. She is widely considered the best handball player ever from Turkey.

== Club career ==
She started her career in Ankara team PTT, played the first European Cup level matches the same year. With outstanding skills in game-reading, Yeliz was labelled as a 'prominent young talent' by several handball experts. She transferred to Norway League for Byåsen HE in Trondheim, played there one full season. Then she came back to Turkey to play in Eskisehir Anadolu Üniversitesi GSK and Üsküdar Bld. SK.

In 2004, Yeliz went to Skopje to playing for Kometal Gjorče Petrov Skopje. After a stint there, she was a player of EHF Champions League 2004–05 season. She scored 61 goals and made a contribution to promote her team final.

In June 2010, Yeliz Özel signed for Romania's top club CS Oltchim Râmnicu Vâlcea. She played two seasons in Romania before returning to her home country.

Özel returned to home country in June 2012 to rejoin her former team Üsküdar Bld. SK. After one season, she transferred to the Ankara-based team Yenimahalle Bld. SK.

In the 2023–24 Turkish Women's Handball Super League season, she transferred to Yalıkaval SK in Bodrum. She won the champions title after the season play-offs. The next season, she won once again the champions title.

== International career ==
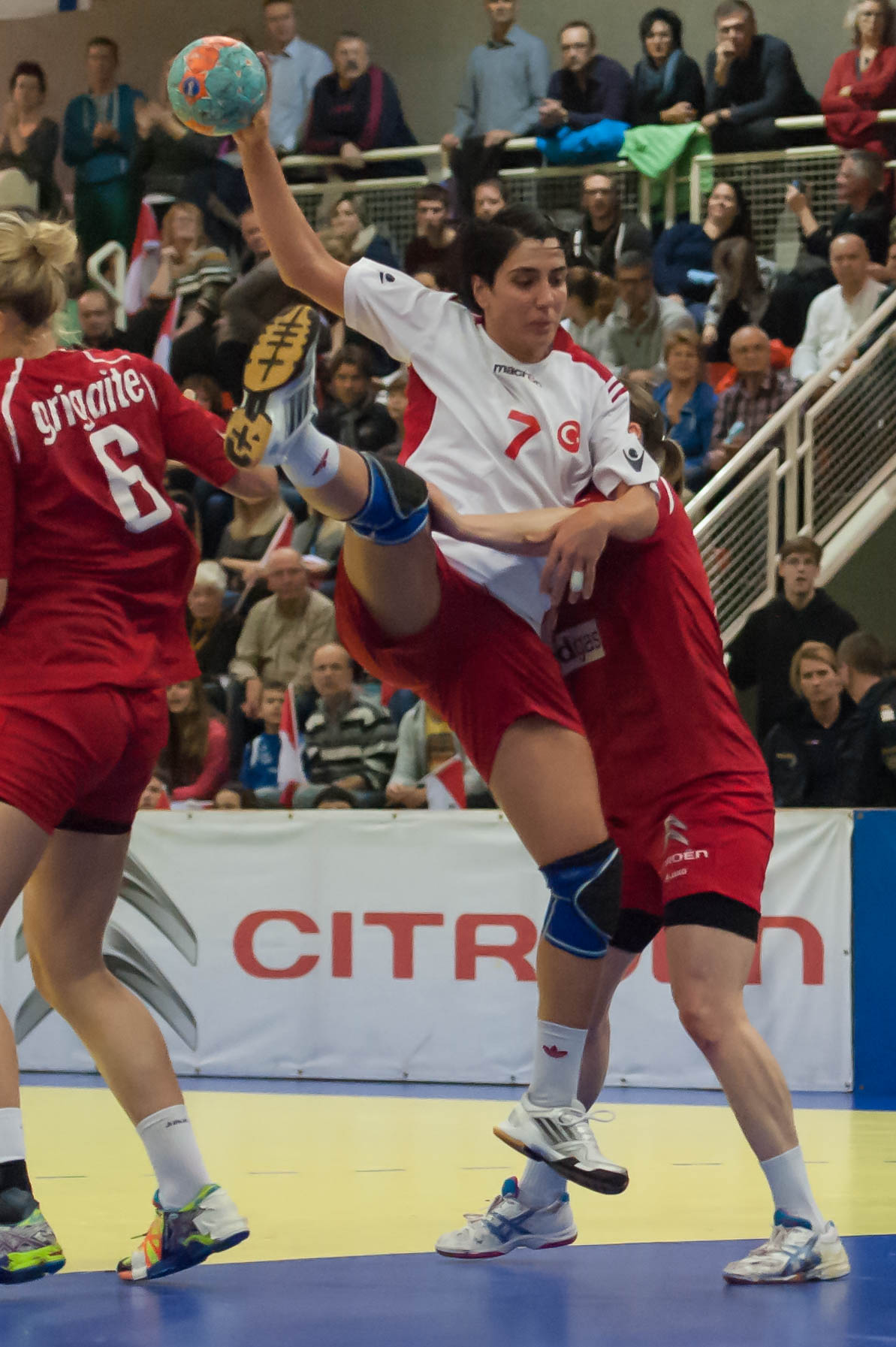
Yeliz Özel (white/red) attacking Austria at the 2015 World Women's Handball Championship European qualification match.

Özel was a member of the Turkey women's national handball team and served as their captain. She was part of the team that won the silver medal at the 2009 Mediterranean Games held in Pescara, Italy. In 2017, she won the silver medal with the national team at the Islamic Solidarity Games in Baku, Azerbaycan.

In April 2022, Yeliz Özel retired from the national team after 27 years.

== Honours ==
=== Club ===
Turkish Women's Handball Super League

- Champions (5): 2003–04, 2007–08, 2008–09, 2009–10, 2014–15, 2023–24, 2024–25
- Runners-up (2): 2012–13, 2013–14

Women's EHF Champions League

- Runner-up (1): 2004–05

=== International ===
Mediterranean Games

- Runner-up (1): 2009

Islamic Solidarity Games
Silver medal (1): 2017
