= 2008–09 Women's EHF Cup =

European handball tournament

Women's EHF Cup
- 2008–09

Tournament information
- Sport: Handball

Final positions
- Champions: (Spain) SD Itxako
- Runner-up: (Germany) HC Leipzig

Tournament statistics
- Top scorer(s): (Norway) Mette Ommundsen (68 Goals)

The 2008–09 Women's EHF Cup was the 28th edition of the competition, taking place from 8 September 2008 to 17 May 2009. SD Itxako defeated HC Leipzig in the final to become the second Spanish club to win the competition.

== Second Qualifying Round ==
Team #1	Agg.	Team #2	1st match	2nd match
Femina Vise (Belgium)	46–62	(Bulgaria) HK Lokomotiv Varna	23–34	23–28
Borac Banja Luka (Bosnia and Herzegovina)	63–50	(Azerbaijan) Garadag Baku	39–27	24–23
Antwerpen (Belgium)	59–39	(Kosovo) Kosova	32–19	27–20
Arkatron Minsk (Belarus)	56–53	(Italy) Vigasio	28–24	28–29
Skövde (Sweden)	71–27	(Bosnia and Herzegovina) Živinice	36–8	35–19
Etar Veliko Tarnovo (Bulgaria)	48–41	(Netherlands) Huyser E&O	26–18	22–23
Sävehof (Sweden)	74–54	(Belarus) Gorodnichanka	32–25	42–29
Bascharage (Luxembourg)	72–42	(Israel) Bnei Herzliya	35–22	37–20
Žalec (Slovenia)	39–55	(Czech Republic) Veseli	18–23	21–32
Üsküdar Bld. SK (Turkey)	104–34	(Cyprus) Aradhippou	63–16	41–18
Stjarnan (Faroe Islands)	43–55	(Slovakia) Slovan Duslo Sala	20–28	23–27

== Second Qualifying Round ==
Team #1	Agg.	Team #2	1st match	2nd match
Kikinda (Serbia)	68–45	(North Macedonia) Kale Kicevo	39–23	29–22
Slagelse (Denmark)	68–42	(Greece) Aris Thessaloniki	32–22	36–20
HK Lokomotiv Varna (Bulgaria)	54–52	(Italy) Sassari	23–30	31–22
Oldenburg (Germany)	78–43	(Switzerland) Spono Nottwil	36–25	42–18
Borac Banja Luka (Bosnia and Herzegovina)	45–75	(Denmark) Randers	20–38	25–37
Frankfurter (Germany)	69–47	(Lithuania) Egle Vilnius	38–23	31–24
Brühl (Switzerland)	75–43	(Belgium) Antwerpen	40–26	35–17
Arkatron Minsk (Belarus)	34–72	(Hungary) Alba Fehérvár KC	15–35	19–37
Skövde (Sweden)	62–64	(Netherlands) VOC Amsterdam	30–35	32–29
Etar Veliko Tarnovo (Bulgaria)	48–66	(Spain) Bera Bera	21–33	27–33
Rostov-Don (Russia)	62–48	(Ukraine) Galychanka	34–26	28–22
Issy (France)	56–51	(Sweden) Sävehof	28–24	28–27
Dunărea Brăila (Romania)	54–60	(Romania) Baia Mare	31–27	23–33
Storhamar (Norway)	68–33	(Luxembourg) Bascharage	35–13	33–20
HC-53 Moscow (Russia)	57–45	(Czech Republic) Veseli	29–21	28–24
Lokomotiva Zagreb (Croatia)	55–55 (a)	(Turkey) Üsküdar Bld. SK	29–27	26–28
Kuban Krasnodar (Russia)	57–50	(Poland) Zaglebie Lubin	32–22	25–28
Amadeo Tortajada (Spain)	64–61	(Portugal) Colégio de Gaia	33–30	31–31
Kefalovrises (Cyprus)	37–71	(Portugal) Madeira	19–36	18–35
Ferencvárosi TC (Hungary)	67–54	(Slovakia) Slovan Duslo Sala	41–23	26–31

== Round of 32 ==
Team #1	Agg.	Team #2	1st match	2nd match
Kikinda (Serbia)	43–77	(Spain) Itxako	25–35	18–42
Slagelse (Denmark)	66–44	(Bulgaria) HK Lokomotiv Varna	40–20	26–24
Dunaújvárosi KKA (Hungary)	58–60	(Germany) Oldenburg	31–31	27–29
Motor Zaporizhzhia (Ukraine)	55–59	(Denmark) Randers	32–26	23–33
Byasen (Norway)	64–55	(Germany) Frankfurter	36–31	28–24
Brühl (Switzerland)	47–66	(Poland) Lublin	28–34	19–32
Patras (Greece)	55–60	(Hungary) Alba Fehérvár KC	27–27	28–33
VOC Amsterdam (Netherlands)	38–84	(Romania) Rulmentul Brașov	23–35	15–49
Bera Bera (Spain)	58–58 (a)	(Russia) Rostov-Don	31–32	27–26
SKP Bratislava (Slovakia)	50–57	(France) Issy	26–27	24–30
Baia Mare (Romania)	51–50	(Turkey) Maliye	29–26	22–24
Storhamar (Norway)	50–50 (a)	(Germany) Leipzig	27–25	23–25
HC-53 Moscow (Russia)	43–46	(Serbia) Naisa Niš	23–23	20–23
Üsküdar Bld. SK (Turkey)	61–73	(Russia) Kuban Krasnodar	30–39	31–34
Amadeo Tortajada (Spain)	46–82	(Russia) Dynamo Volgograd	21–42	25–40
Ferencvárosi TC (Hungary)	71–54	(Portugal) Madeira	38–29	33–25

== Round of 16 ==
Team #1	Agg.	Team #2	1st match	2nd match
Itxako (Spain)	63–37	(Denmark) Slagelse	31–14	32–23
Oldenburg (Germany)	53–54	(Denmark) Randers	28–27	25–27
Byasen (Norway)	52–48	(Poland) Lublin	26–24	26–24
Alba Fehérvár KC (Hungary)	60–69	(Romania) Rulmentul Brașov	33–33	27–36
Rostov-Don (Russia)	47–56	(France) Issy	29–30	18–26
Baia Mare (Romania)	55–56	(Germany) Leipzig	27–23	28–33
Naisa Niš (Serbia)	58–64	(Russia) Kuban Krasnodar	36–30	22–34
Dynamo Volgograd (Russia)		(Hungary) Ferencvárosi TC	35–29	cancelled

== Quarter-finals ==
Team #1	Agg.	Team #2	1st match	2nd match
Itxako (Spain)	59–51	(Denmark) Randers	27–19	32–32
Byasen (Norway)	49–60	(Romania) Rulmentul Brașov	27–31	22–29
Issy (France)	34–41	(Germany) Leipzig	22–17	12–24
Kuban Krasnodar (Russia)	50–70	(Russia) Dynamo Volgograd	21–35	29–35

== Semifinals ==
Team #1	Agg.	Team #2	1st match	2nd match
Itxako (Spain)	51–50	(Romania) Rulmentul Brașov	23–23	28–27
Leipzig (Germany)	45–39	(Russia) Dynamo Volgograd	25–15	20–24

== Final ==
Team #1	Agg.	Team #2	1st match	2nd match
Itxako (Spain)	52–45	(Germany) Leipzig	27–19	25–26

== Top goalscorers ==
As of 17 May 2009

Rank	Player	Club	Goals
1	(Norway) Mette Ommundsen	(Germany) HC Leipzig	68
2	(Russia) Vladlena Bobrovnikova	(Russia) HC Kuban	66
3	(Portugal) Alexandrina Cabral Barbosa	(Romania) Rulmentul-Urban Brașov	56
