= Üsküdar Bld. SK (women's handball) =

Women's handball club in Istanbul, Turkey

- Full name: Üsküdar Belediyeesi Kadın Hentbol Spor Kulübü
- Founded: 1984; 42 years ago
- Ground: Çamlıca Sports Hall, Üsküdar, Istanbul
- Owner(s): Municipality of Üsküdar, Istanbul
- President: Mecit Çetinkaya
- Website: http://www.uskudarbldspor.com/

Üsküdar Bld. SK (Turkish: Üsküdar Belediyesi Kadın Hentbol Spor Kulübü) is the women's handball side of the multi-sports club of Üsküdar Belediyespor in Istanbul, Turkey sponsored by the municipality of Üsküdar district (Turkish: Üsküdar Belediyesi). The team plays its home matches at the Bağlarbaşı Sports Hall in Üsküdar.

== Achievements ==
Handball team:

- 2000-2001 Turkish Cup runner-up
- 2001-2002 Turkish Women's League and Turkish Cup runner-up
- 2002-2003 Turkish Women's League runner-up, Turkish Cup and Federation Cup champion
- 2003-2004 Turkish League, Turkish Cup and Federation Cup champion, European Cup Championship quarter finalist
- 2006-2007 Turkish League 3rd
- 2007-2008 Turkish League runner-up, Turkish Cup 3rd
- 2008-2009 Turkish Cup champion
- 2008-2009 Turkish Super League runner-up
- 2009-2010 Turkish Cup champion
- 2009-2010 Turkish Super League runner-up
- 2010-2011 Turkish Super League champion

== Arena ==
The team play their home matches at Çamlıca Sports Hall

== Current squad ==
=== Technical staff ===
- Head coach: (Turkey) Serkan İnci

=== Players ===
Team members at the 2025–26 Turkish Women's Handball Super League:

- 3 (Turkey) Seval Bozova (RW)
- 5 (Turkey) Tuğba Aktemur
- 7 (Turkey) İlayda Yüksel
- 8 (Turkey) Ayşenur Kara
- 9 (Turkey) Sinem Vatan Güney (RW)
- 11 (Turkey) Sudenaz Dağlı
- 13 (Montenegro) Marija Kaluđerović (LP)
- 17 (Turkey) Fatmagül Midilli
- 18 (Turkey) Nil Şengöçen
- 19 (Turkey) Yağmur Özler (LW)
- 23 (Turkey) Yasemin Şahin (LW)
- 26 (Turkey) Ayşenur Şensöz
- 27 (Montenegro) Nina Abromovic (GK)
- 29 (Turkey) Sena Nur Çelik (LB)
- 63 (Turkey) Helin Su Karagözlü
- 78 (Republic of the Congo) Fanta Diagouraga (LB)

== Former notable sportspeople ==
Azerbaijan

- Marina Tankaskaya (born 1983)

North Macedonia

- Lenche Ilkova (born 1984)

Romania

- Dorina Emilia Carbune (born 1985)
- Dorina Emilia Carbune
- Anca Mihaela Rombescu (born 1985)
- Talida Tolnai (born 1979)
- Patricia Vizitiu (born 1988)
- Anca Mihaela Rombescu (born 1985)

Turkey

- Yağmur Bembeyaz (born 1999)
- Edanur Burhan (born 1999)
- Ceyhan Coşkunsu (born 2002)
- Serpil Çapar (born 1981)
- Sevilay İmamoğlu Öcal (born 1984)
- Serpil İskenderoğlu (born 1982)
- Sude Karademir (born 2001)
- Yeliz Özel (born 1980)
- Yasemin Şahin (born 1988)
- Fatmagül Sakızcan (born 1992)
- Derya Tınkaoğlu (born 1988)
- Çağla Yaman (born 1981)
- Betül Yılmaz (born 1988)
- Yeliz Yılmaz (born 1980)
- Sinem Vatan Güney (born 1996)
