= İzmir Büyükşehir Belediyesi GSK =

Multi-sports club

İzmir Büyükşehir Belediyespor
- Founded: 1979
- Based in: İzmir
- Colors: Blue & white
- Owner: İzmir Metropolitan Municipality
- President: Pervin Şenel Genç
- Website: www.izmirbsbspor.org

Active branches of İzmir Büyükşehir Belediyespor
Archery	Athletics	Badminton
Basketball	Contract bridge	Fencing
Football	Gymnastics	Handball (women)
Ice hockey	Judo	Sailing
Table tennis	Taekwondo	Volleyball
Water polo (women)	Weightlifting	Wrestling
Powerlifting	Wheelchair basketball

İzmir Büyükşehir Belediyespor (Turkish: İzmir Büyükşehir Belediyesi Spor Kulübü) is a multi-sports club established 1979 in İzmir, Turkey by the city's metropolitan municipality (Turkish: İzmir Büyükşehir Belediyesi). The club's colors are blue and white. İzmir Büyükşehir Belediyespor is active in a total of 21 branches, including Paralympic and many Olympic sports. The men's handball team of the club plays in the Turkish Handball Super League, the women's team in the Turkish Women's Handball Super League and the wheelchair basketball team in the Turkish Wheelchair Basketball Super League successfully.

== Venues ==
Main venues of the club are:

- Bornova Ice Sports Hall inside the Aşık Veysel Recreational Area, Bornova: Ice hockey
- Celal Atik Sports Hall, Kültürpark: Basketball, handball, volleyball
- Evka-4 Sports Complex, Bornova: Basketball, handball, volleyball

== Achievements ==
=== Handball ===
Men's
Turkish Handball Super League

- Champions (1): 2007–08

Women's

Turkish Women's Handball Super League

- Runners-up (1): 2010–11
- Third place (2): 2007–08, 2021–22

=== Ice hockey ===
Turkish Ice Hockey Super League

- Champions (1): 2013–14.
- Runners-up (3): 2012–13, 2014–15, 2015–16

=== Water polo ===
Turkish Women's Water Polo First League

- Champions (1): 2022–23.

LEN Women's Challenger Cup
Champions (2): 2023–24, 2024-25.

=== Wheelchair basketball ===
Turkish Wheelchair Basketball First League

- Champions (1): 1996–97

Turkish Wheelchair Basketball Super League

- Champions (4): 2000–01, 2001–02, 2002–03, 2003–04

André Vergauwen Cup

- Runners-up (1): 2003.

== Notable sportspeople ==
- İbrahim Arat (born 1988), weightlifter
- Remzi Başakbuğday (born 1989), taekwondo practitioner
- Recep Çelik (born 1987), racewalker
- Duygu Çete (born 1989), 2012 Summer Paralympics bronze medalist female visually impaired judoka
- Begül Löklüoğlu (born 1988), female archer
- Semiha Mutlu (born 1987), female racewalker
