= Melike Kasapoğlu =

Turkish handball player (born 2004)

Personal information
- Born: 11 May 2004 (age 22) Bursa, Turkey
- Height: 1.78 m (5 ft 10 in)

Sport
- Sport: Handball
- Position: Pivot
- Current club: Ankara Yurdum
- Number: 10

Senior clubs
- Years: Team
- 2019–2022: Mudanya Bld.
- 2022–2025: Bursa BB
- 2025–: Ankara Yurdum
National team
- Years: Team
- 2022–2023: Turkey girls' U17
- 2025: Turkey women's U19
- 2023–: Turkey
Medal record
Women's Handball
Representing Turkey
Islamic Solidarity Games
Gold medal – first place	2025 Riyadh	Team

Melike Kasapoğlu (born 11 May 2004) is a Turkish handballer, who plays as pivot in the Turkish Women's Handball Super League for Ankara Yurdum and the Turkey national handball team.

== Early years ==
Kasapoğlu started handball playing during her primary education. She was discovered while playing handball in the schoolyard by Merve Yılmaz, an officer of the Ministry of Youth and Sports and a head coach, who was scouting talented children for sports in Mudanya District of Bursa Province. She trained and joined the newly founded team, which won champion titles in regional tournaments. She was part of the team consisted of the same group of students that achieved success at national level. Ten years later, the team became champion in the Turkish Women's Handball First League defeated in one match only.

== Club career ==
=== Mudanya Bld. ===
Kasapoğlu first entered Mudanya Bld. in Bursa Province, where she last played in the 2021–22 First League.

=== Bursa BB ===
For the 2022–23 First League season, she movedher hometown club Bursa BB. Her team, she was captain of, finished the 2022–23 First League season as league champion, and was promoted to the Turkish Women's Handball Super League. She last appeared for Bursa BB in the 2024–25 Super League season. In May 2025, her team won the Turkish Women's Handball Cup.

=== Anadolu Üniversitesi ===
Mid July 2025, she transferred to Anadolu Üniversitesi in Eskişehir. However, she did not play for the team.

=== Ankara Yurdum ===
She joined Ankara Yurdum, which was newly established and entered the 2025–26 Super League season on a wild card basis.

She is 1.78 m (5 ft 10 in) tall, and plays in the pivot position.

== International career ==
Kasapoğlu was selected to the national team in February 2022 to participate at the preparation camp. In November 2023, she was called up to the newly esyablished A2 national team for the preparation camp.

She played in the national team, which won the gold medal at the 2025 Islamic Solidarity Games in Riyadh, Saudi Arabia.

== Personal life ==
Melike Kasapoğlu was born in Bursa, Turkey, on 11 May 2004.

== Honours ==
=== Club ===
Bursa BB

Turkish Women's Handball Super League
Third places (1): 2024–25

Turkish Women's Handball First League
Champions (1): 2022–23

Turkish Women's Handball Cup
Winners (1): 2025

=== International ===
Turkey women's national handball team

Islamic Solidarity Games
(gold) (1): 2025

=== Personal ===
Top goalscorer (1): 2021–22 First League (Mudanya Bld.)
