= Edanur Burhan =

Turkish handball player (born 1999)

Personal information
- Born: 11 October 1999 (age 27) Istanbul, Turkey
- Height: 1.70 m (5 ft 7 in)

Sport
- Sport: Handball
- Position: Right back
- Current club: Yalıkavak
- Number: 7

Senior clubs
- Years: Team
- 2013–2014: Üsküdar Bld.
- 2017–2020: Yenimahalle Bld.
- 2020–: Yalıkavak
National team
- Years: Team
- 2022–2023: Turkey girls' U17
- 2025: Turkey women's U19
- 2023–: Turkey
Medal record
Women's Handball
Representing Turkey
Islamic Solidarity Games
Gold medal – first place	2025 Riyadh	Team

Edanur Burhan (born 11 October 1999) is a Turkish handballer, who plays in the right back position in the Turkish Women's Handball Super League for Yalıkavak and the Turkey national handball team.

== Club career ==
=== Üsküdar Bld. ===
Burhan started her handball playing career at an early age in Üsküdar Bld. of her hometown.

=== Yenimahall ===
In 2017, she moved to Ankara, and signed with Yenimahalle Bld..

=== Yalıkavak ===
Burhan transferred in 2020 to the Bodrum-based club Yalıkavak

She enjoyed her team's champion title in the 2023–24 Turkish Women's Handball Super League, and the next season. With her team, she won the 2022–23 Turkish Women's Handball Cup. The next season, they lost the Cup to Konyaaltı Bld..

She won with her team the Turkish Women's Handball Super Cup in 2023, and 2024. Her team lost the 2025 Super Cup final to Bursa BB.

She is 1.70 m (5 ft 7 in) tall, and plays in the right back position. In the former years, she played as left winger for Üsküdar Bld. and as center back for Yenimahalle Bld.

== International career ==
Burhan played in the national team, which won the gold medal at the 2025 Islamic Solidarity Games in Riyadh, Saudi Arabia.

She was called up to the national team for the 2026 European Women's Handball Championship.

== Personal life ==
Edanur Burhan was born in Istanbul, Turkey, on 11 October 1999.

== Honours ==
=== Club ===
Turkish Women's Handball Super League

Yalıkavak
Champions (2): 2023–24, 2024–25
Runners-up (2): 2020–21, 2021–22

Turkish Women's Handball Super Cup

Yalıkavak
Winners (2): 2023, 2024
Finalists (1): 2025

Yenimahalle Bld.
Finalists (1): 2017

Turkish Women's Handball Cup

Yalıkavak
Winners (1): 2022–23
Finalists (1): 2023–24

=== International ===
Turkey women's national handball team

Islamic Solidarity Games
(gold) (1): 2025
