= Sude Çifçi =

Turkish handball player (born 2004)

Personal information
- Born: 10 November 2004 (age 21) Osmangazi, Bursa Province, Turkey
- Height: 1.70 m (5 ft 7 in)

Sport
- Sport: Handball
- Position: Left wing
- Current club: Ankara Yurdum
- Number: 25

Senior clubs
- Years: Team
- 2019–2022: Mudanya Bld.
- 2022–2025: Bursa BB
- 2025–: Ankara Yurdum
National team
- Years: Team
- 2022–2023: Turkey girls' U17
- 2025: Turkey women's U19
- 2023–: Turkey
Medal record
Women's Handball
Representing Turkey
Islamic Solidarity Games
Gold medal – first place	2025 Riyadh	Team

Sude Çifçi (born 10 November 2004) is a Turkish handballer, who plays as left winger in the Turkish Women's Handball Super League for Ankara Yurdum and the Turkey national handball team.

== Club career ==
=== Mudanya Bld. ===
Çifçi started handball playing at an early age. Already in 2019, she played at Mudanya Bld. in Bursa Province in the Turkish Women's Handball First League. In the 2021–22 First League season she contributed much to her team's advance to the play-offs as being the league top goalscorer with 141 goals in 17 league matches.

=== Bursa BB ===
In the 2022–23 First League season, she transferred to Bursa BB. The team finished the season as league champion, and was promoted to the Turkish Women's Handball Super League. Çifçi was instrumental in her team's success by being top goalscorer with 161 goals in 22 league matches. Her contract was extended for the 2023–24 season. She netted 63 goals in 18 league games in the season, and her contract was renewed for the 2024–25 season. In 2025, her team won both cups, the Turkish Women's Handball Cup, and the Turkish Women's Handball Super Cup.

=== Anadolu Üniversitesi ===
Mid July 2025, she transferred to Anadolu Üniversitesi in Eskişehir. However, she didnot play.

=== Ankara Yurdum ===
She joined Ankara Yurdum, which was newly established and entered the 2025–26 Super League season on a wild card basis.

She is 1.70 m (5 ft 7 in) tall, and plays in the left wing position.

== International career ==
=== Turkey girls' cadet ===
Çifçi was part of the Turkey girls' cadet team, which took part at the 2019 European Qualification Championship in Italy.

=== Turkey women's ===
Çifçi was selected to the national team in March 2023 to participate at preparation camp.

She played in the national team, which won the gold medal at the 2025 Islamic Solidarity Games in Riyadh, Saudi Arabia.

== Personal life ==
Sude Çifçi was born in Osmangazi, Bursa Province, Turkey, on 10 November 2004.

== Honours ==
=== Club ===
Bursa BB

Turkish Women's Handball Super League
Third places (1): 2024–25

Turkish Women's Handball First League
Champions (1): 2022–23

Turkish Women's Handball Cup
Winners (1): 2024–25

=== International ===
Turkey women's national handball team

Islamic Solidarity Games
(gold) (1): 2025

=== Personal ===
Top goalscorer (1): 2021–22 First League (Mudanya Bld.)
