= Handball in Turkey =

Handball is a popular sport in Turkey. The Turkish Handball Federation (Turkish: Türkiye Hentbol Federasyonu, THF) governs men's and women's handball competitions and selects the national teams.

== History ==
=== Beginnins ===
Handball in Turkey first started as open field handball between 1927–1938. Hüsamettin Güreli, Zeki Gökışık and Nafi Tağman, who studied in Germany, and were teachers of physical education, pioneered it in military schools. In addition to these military schools some rules were determined in the Physical Education Department of the Gazi Education Institute in Ankara, which contributed to the survival of handball under the name of "hand ball" on football fields. The first official field hand ball game rules in Turkey were published in 1934 by the Turkish Sports Association Alliance (Turkish: Türkiye İdman Cemiyeti ittifakı). The first official open field handball match was played in 1938.

The first federation president, Vedat Abut, served for a short time, and then handed over the presidency to Fail Gökay. In 1958, with the efforts of president, Vahit Çolakoğlu, Turkish handball gained a new identity under the name of "Volleyball Handball". During Çolakoğlu's term of office, open field handball competitions were held between club teams, such as Harbokulu (of Military Academy), Jandarmagücü (of Gendarmerie), Ziraat Gençlik (of Ziraat Bank), Maltepe, Emniyet (of Security), Anıtspor, Pınarspor and Doğuspor. At the end of the competitions held, Harbokulu became the champion almost every year.

Pioneering books on handball were published by Hasan Örengil in 1941, and the duo Mehmet Arkan and İlyas Sınal in 1947. The development of handball entered a period of acceleration when it was organized together with volleyball and basketball under the roof of the "Sports Games Federation" in 1942. The Istanbul Handball League was established in the 1942–43 season, and the Defterdar Team (of Revenue Administration) became the champion in the said league. Fenerhçe held the championship in the 1943–44 and 1944-45 seasons, and Galatasaray between 1945 and 1955. The first TurkishHandball Championship was held in 1945, and the Military Academy Handball team became the first Turkish champion. From 1945 on, women's indoor handball matches of 2x15 minutes were played in two stages. Referee courses opened in 1960–1962, and the successful players at the end of this course became the first group to officially receive the title of referee.

== Indoor handball ==
The first serious studies on indoor handball in Turkey date back to 1974-1975. During this time, a group of physical education teachers sent abroad by the Ministry of National Education for study returned from Federal Germany, where they were educated and carried out valuable studies that formed the foundations of modern indoor handball in the Physical Education Departments, where they worked. In 1975, the rules of indoor handball were compiled and published for the first time as a book by Yaşar Sevim, a faculty member at the Gazi Education Institute and Ankara Sports Academy. The valuable studies carried out on indoor handball at the aforementioned university made significant contributions to the spread of indoor handball in the country. With the efforts of the then Minister of Youth and Sports, Ali Şevki Erek, and the Director General of Physical Education, Talat Akgül, the Turkish Handball Federation was established as the 22nd federation on 4 February 1976. Yaşar Sevim, who studied handball, basketball, football, volleyball, and training information at the German Sports Academy in Cologn for four years, was appointed as the president of the federation.

As one of the important steps of the studies that started with the establishment of the Turkish Handball Federation, a branch of handball science was established in the Physical Education and Sports Departments of universities in 1977 and was included in the curriculum programs of other educational institutions over time. Handball was included as a basic and specialization course in Ankara 19 Mayıs, Istanbul and Manisa Sports Academies.

With the referee and coaching training programs opened, important steps were taken towards the institutionalization of handball in Turkey. In parallel with the importance given to education studies, 16 coaching courses were organized between 1976–1979, and at the end of these courses, sportspeople were entitled to receive coaching certificates. The number of coaches increased to 323 in 1976, 457 in 1977 and 593 in 1978.

The handball sport, of which base is formed by school, .later became more widespread and developed with the support of the clubs in big cities like Beşiktaş, İstanbul Bankası Yenişehir, İ.T.Ü., Kolej, Arçelik, Simtel, Taçspor, Çukobirlik, Hacettepe, Karşıyaka, İzmirspor, Etispor, Eskişehir Kılıçoğlu Toprakspor, Pertevniyal and Konya, Adana, Ankara, Eskişehir, Mersin, Trabzon, Rize, Bursa, to name a few.

=== International era ===
The first Turkey men's national handball team camp was held in Bursa between 5–25 July 1978 with 26 athletes selected from different regions. Yaşar Sevim, who served as the technical director in the camp, continued to serve as the head coach of the men's national A team for the following ten years. he men's national team played their first official match against Egypt during the Mediterranean Games held in Split, Yugoslavia on 12 September 1979, and the match ended 16-31 against the Turkey team. The men's national youth team played their first international match against the Bulgarian team in Lovech, Bulgaria on 8 August 1979, and lost the match 29–10. The men's national team won their first game against Greece on 16 December1981, in the Balkan Championship held in Romania, with a score of 32–19. The Turkey women's national handball team debuted internationally in the match on 8 December1983 against Bulgaria in Haskovo, Bulgaria and lost with a score of 28–12. The Turkey University men's national team participated in the University World Championship held in Federal Germany for the first time in 1984. The Turkey team lost the first match of the championship against Austria by 22–15. The men's national youth team became Balkan champion among four nations in İzmir, Turkey in 1992. In the first Balkan Juniors Championship for Men and Women held in June 1993, the Turkish handball players becamerunner-up in the men's category and third in the women's category. In November the same year, the men's national team won the Balkan Championship for the first time in the country's handball history. In the 1994 Balkan Junior Women's Balkan Championship, Turkey team came first. In the Balkan Junior Championship held in Eskişehir, the national handball players came third in both the men's and women's categories. In the World Interuniversity Handball Championship held in İzmir in January 1995, The Turkish players became runner-up, and in the Balkan Senior Handball Championship held in Eskişehir, Turkey national team became champion.

== Men's handball ==
=== Leagues ===
The men's competitions are:

- Turkish Men's Handball Super League (THF Erkekler Hentbol Süper Ligi)

The op-level men's league consists of 12 teams (2024–25). At the end of the season, the last placed two teams are relegated to the Men's First league. The semi-finalist teams participate at the Turkish Men's Championship.

- Turkish Men's Handball First League (THF Erkekler Hentbol 1. Ligi)

The league is composed of a toal of 19 teams in two groups (2024–25). At the end of the normal season, the last placed teams of the groups are relegated to the Men's Second League, t he league champion and the runner-up after the play-offs are promoted to the Men's Super League. The semi-finalist teams participate at the Turkish Men's Handball Championship.

- Turkish Men's Handball Second League (THF Erkekler Hentbol 2. Ligi)

A total of 35 teams compete in eight groups of each four or five teams depending on the geographical location of the teams (2024–25). The final four teams are promoted to the Men's First League. No relegation to the lower-level league takes place.

- Turkish Men's Handball Regional League (THF Erkekler Hentbol Bölgesel Ligi)

At the end of the season, the four top placed teams are promoted to the Men's Second League.

=== Cups ===
Two cups are played each year:

- Turkish Men's Handball Super Cup (THF Erkekler Türkiye Süper Kupası)

The Men's Super Cup is played at the beginning of the Men's Super League's new season between the previous year's Men's Super League champion and the Men's Cup winner. If the Men's Super League champion is also the Men's Cup winner, the team that played the final of the Men's Cup is entitled to compete in the Men's Super Cup.

- Turkish Men's Handball Cup (THF Erkekler Türkiye Kupası)

The cup is played between the teams of the Men's Super League and four teams of the Men's First League.

=== Tournaments ===
- Turkish Men's Handball Championship
- Farm team tournaments: Provincial tournaments, Turkish tournaments for mini and youth boys, junior men age groups.

=== International-level club participation ===
- EHF European Cup

=== National teams ===
Three men's national teams play at international competitions:

- Turkey men's national handball team
- Turkey men's national junior handball team
- Turkey men's national youth handball team

=== National team participations ===
- World Men's Handball Championship * Qualification
- European Men's Handball Championship qualification
- Handball at the Islamic Solidarity Games
- Handball at the Mediterranean Games
- Balkan Championships

== Women's handball ==
=== Leagues ===
There are four women's handball leagues:

- Turkish Women's Handball Super League (THF Kadınlar Süper Ligi)

10 teams compete in the top-level league (2024–25). At the end of the season, the last placed team is relegated to the Women's First League. The semi-finalist teams participate at the Turkish Women's Championship.

- Turkish Women's Handball First League (THF Kadınlar 1. Ligi)

15 teams compete in two groups (2024-25). At the end of the season, the league champion and the runner-up are promoted to the Women's Super League, the season's last placed team of each group is relegated to the Women's Second League. Semi-finalist teams participate at the Turkish Women's Championship.

- Turkish Women's Handball Second League (THF Kadınlar 2. Ligi)

The league is composed of a total of 37 teams in eight groups of each four or five teams depending on the geographical location of the teams (2024–25). The first four teams of the Final Four are promoted to the Women's First League. No relegation to the lower-level league takes place.

- Turkish Women's Handball Regional League (THF Kadınlar Bölgesel Ligi)

Four top-placed teams are promoted to the Women's Second League at the end of the season.

=== Cups ===
Two cups are played each year:

- Turkish Women's Handball Super Cup (THF Kadınlar Türkiye Süper Kupası)

At the beginning of the Women's Super League's new season, the cup is awarded to the winner of the match played between the previous year's Women's Super League champion and the Women's Cup winner. If the Women's Super League champion is also the Women's Cup winner, the team that played the final of the Women's Cup is entitled to compete in the Women's Super Cup.

- Turkish Women's Handball Cup (THF Kadınlar Türkiye Kupası)

The cup is played between the teams of the Women's Super League and eight teams of the Women's First League.

=== Tournaments ===
- Turkish Women's Handball Championship
- Farm team tournaments: Provincial tournaments, Turkish tournaments for mini and youth girls, junior women age groups.

=== International-level club participations ===
- EHF Women's Champions League
- EHF Women's European League
- EHF Women's Cup Winners' Cup
- EHF Women's European Cup
- Women's EHF Cup

=== National teams ===
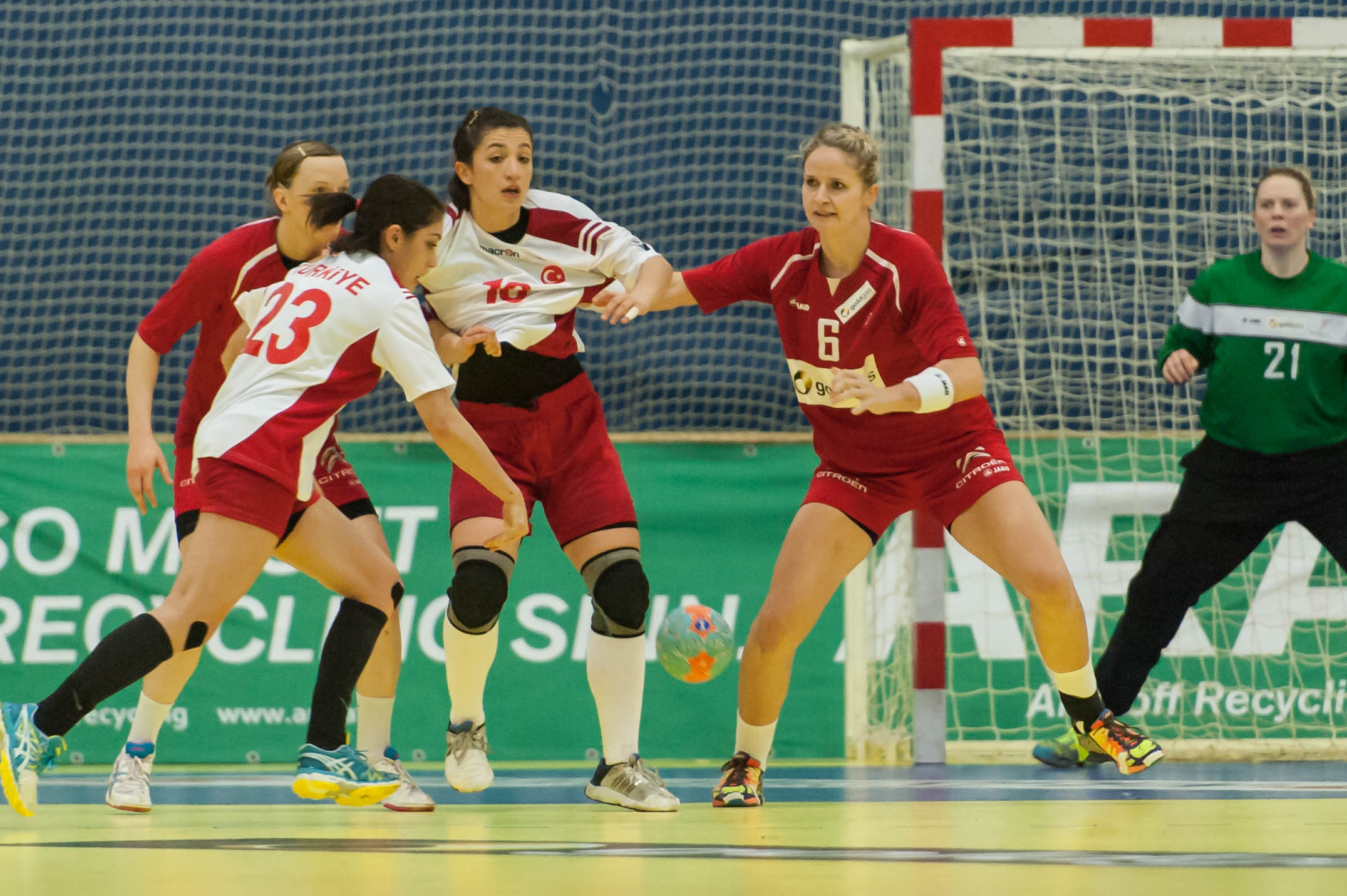
Turkey women's at the 2015 World Women's Handball Championship Qualification

Three women's national teams play at international competitions:

- Turkey women's national handball team
- Turkey women's national junior handball team
- Turkey women's national youth handball team

=== National team participations ===
- World Women's Handball Championship qualification
- European Women's Handball Championship
- Handball at the Islamic Solidarity Games
- Balkan Championship
