= Ceyhan Coşkunsu =

Turkish handball player (born 2002)

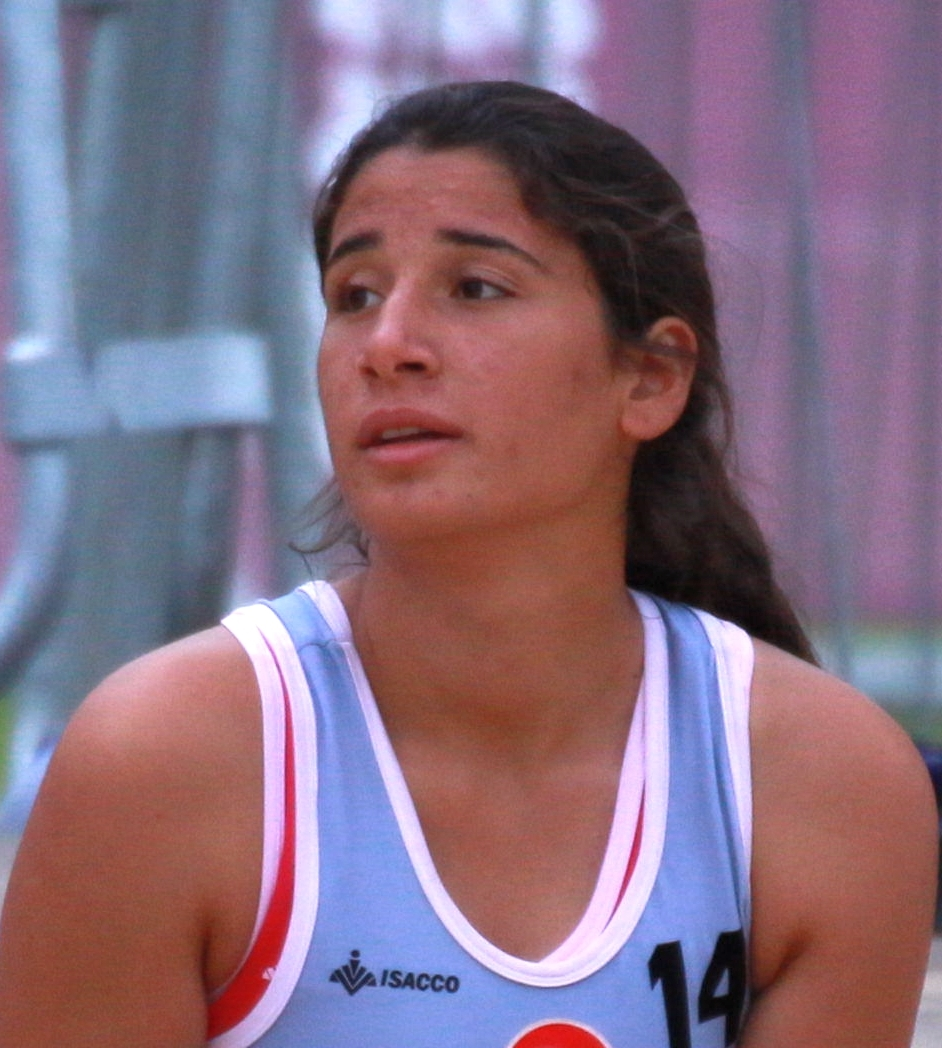
- Ceyhan Coşkunsu (October 2018)

Personal information
- Born: 14 May 2002 (age 24) Çorum, Turkey
- Height: 1.82 m (5 ft 11 1/2 in)

Sport
- Sport: Handball
- Position: Goalkeeper
- Current club: Ankara Yurdum
- Number: 87

Senior clubs
- Years: Team
- 2014–2015: Görkem Gençlik
- 2015–2016: Kastamonu Bld.
- 2016–2021: Araç Bld.
- 2021–2022: Kastamonu Bld.
- 2022–2023: Yalıkavak
- 2023–2024: Üsküdar Bld.
- 2024–2025: Adasokağı
- 2025–: Ankara Yurdum
National team
- Years: Team
- 2018: Turkey women's U19 beach handball
- 2016: Turkey girls' U17
- 2021–: Turkey
Medal record
Women's Handball
Representing Turkey
Islamic Solidarity Games
Gold medal – first place	2025 Riyadh	Team

Ceyhan Coşkunsu (born 14 May 2002) is a Turkish handballer, who plays as goalkeeper in the Turkish Women's Handball Super League for Ankara Yurdum] and the Turkey national handball team,.

== Club career ==
Coşkunsu started her handball career at an early age. As a young girl, she played for Görkem GS. When she moved to Kastamonu for her high school education, she joined Kastamonu Bld. in 2016. She then transferred to Araç Bld. Women's Handball Sport Club in Kastamonu, which was founded in 2014 as part of a district municipality's project, and started to play in the Turkish Second League. In July 2020, her contract was extended for three years. Her team was then promoted to the First League. At the end of the 2020–21 First League season, her team finished as runners-up and was promoted to the Super League. The next season, she was with Kastamonu Bld.. In the 2022–23 Super League season, she was part of Yalıkavak in Bodrum. She then transferred to Üsküdar Bld. in Istanbul for the 2023–24 Super League season. In the 2024–25 Super League season, she played for the Adana-based club Adasokağı. End May 2025, she signed with Bursa BB for the 2025–26 Super League season. However, she did not play, and joined Ankara Yurdum, which was newly established and entered the 2025–26 Super League season on a wild card basis.

She is 1.82 m (5 ft 11 1/2 in) tall, and plays as goalkeeper.

== International career ==
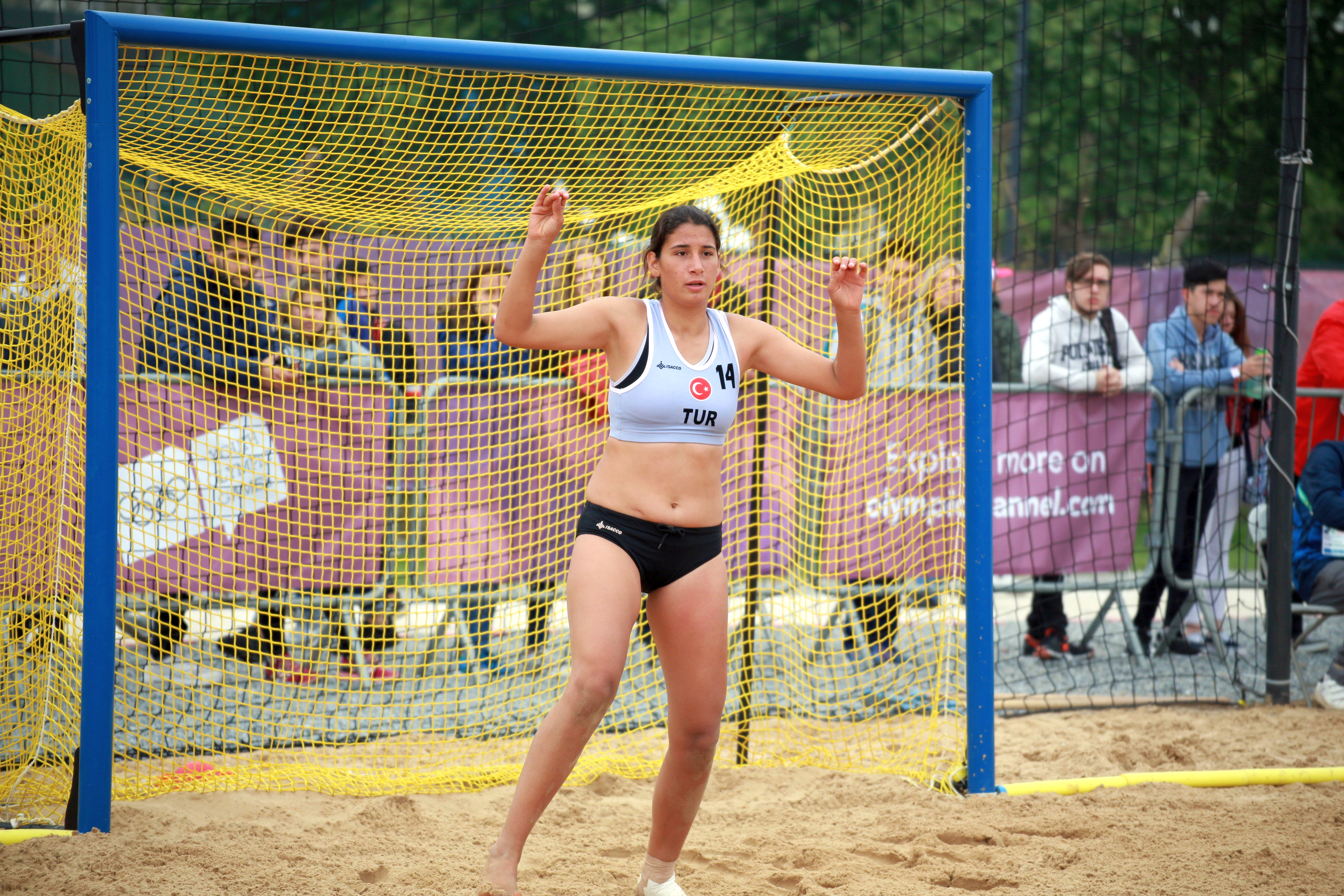
Ceyhan Coşkunsu (14), goalkeeper of the Turkey women's national U-19 beach handball team at the 2018 Summer Youth Olympics.

=== Turkey girls' cadet ===
Coşkunsu was selected to the Turkey girls' national cadet handball team already in 2016.

=== Turkey girls' youth beach handball ===
She played for the Turkey women's national beach handball team at the 2018 Summer Youth Olympics held in Buenos Aires, Argentina.

=== Turkey women's ===
She was selected to the national team for the 2021 World Women's Handball Championship – European qualification. She played in one match of the qualification stage at the 2022–23 Women's EHF European League.

In November 2023, she was selected to the A2 national team to participate at the national team camp to be held in Ankara in December. Mid October 2024, she was called up to the national team for preparation matches in Romania, and in November in the preparation camp for the 2024 European Championship.

She played in the national team, which won the gold medal at the 2025 Islamic Solidarity Games in Riyadh, Saudi Arabia.

== Personal life ==
Ceyhan Coşkunsu was born in Çorum, Turkey, on 14 May 2002.

At age 13, she moved to Kastamonu, where she attanded high school.

== Honours ==
=== Club ===
Turkish Women's Handball Super League
Champions (1): 2021–22 (Kastamonu Bld.)
Runners-up (1): 2024–25 (Adasokağı)

Turkish Women's Handball First League
Runners-up (1): 2020–21 (Araç Bld.)

=== International ===
Turkey women's national handball team

Islamic Solidarity Games
Champions (1): 2025
