= Zeynep Nur Kapaklıkaya =

Turkish handball player (born 2000)

Personal information
- Born: 20 June 2000 (age 26) Turkey

Sport
- Sport: Handball
- Position: Right back
- Current club: Odunpazarı

Senior clubs
- Years: Team
- –: Odunpazarı
National team
- Years: Team
- 2025–: Turkey
Medal record
Women's Handball
Representing Turkey
Islamic Solidarity Games
Gold medal – first place	2025 Riyadh	Team

Zeynep Nur Kapaklıkaya (born 20 June 2000) is a Turkish handballer, who plays in the right back position in the Turkish Women's Handball Super League for Odunpazarı and the Turkey national handball team.

== Club career ==
Kapaklıkaya plays for the Eskişehir-based club Odunpazarı in the Turkish Women's Handball Super League. Her team finished the 2024–25 Turkish Women's Handball First League season as runners-up, and was promoted to the Super League in the 2025–26 season.

== International career ==
Burhan played in the national team, which won the gold medal at the 2025 Islamic Solidarity Games in Riyadh, Saudi Arabia.

== Personal life ==
Zeynep Nur Kapaklıkaya was born on 20 June 2000.

== Honours ==
=== Club ===
Turkish Women's Handball First League

Odunpazarı
Runners-up (1): 2024–25

=== International ===
Turkey women's national handball team

Islamic Solidarity Games
(gold) (1): 2025
