= Serpil İskenderoğlu =

Turkish handball player

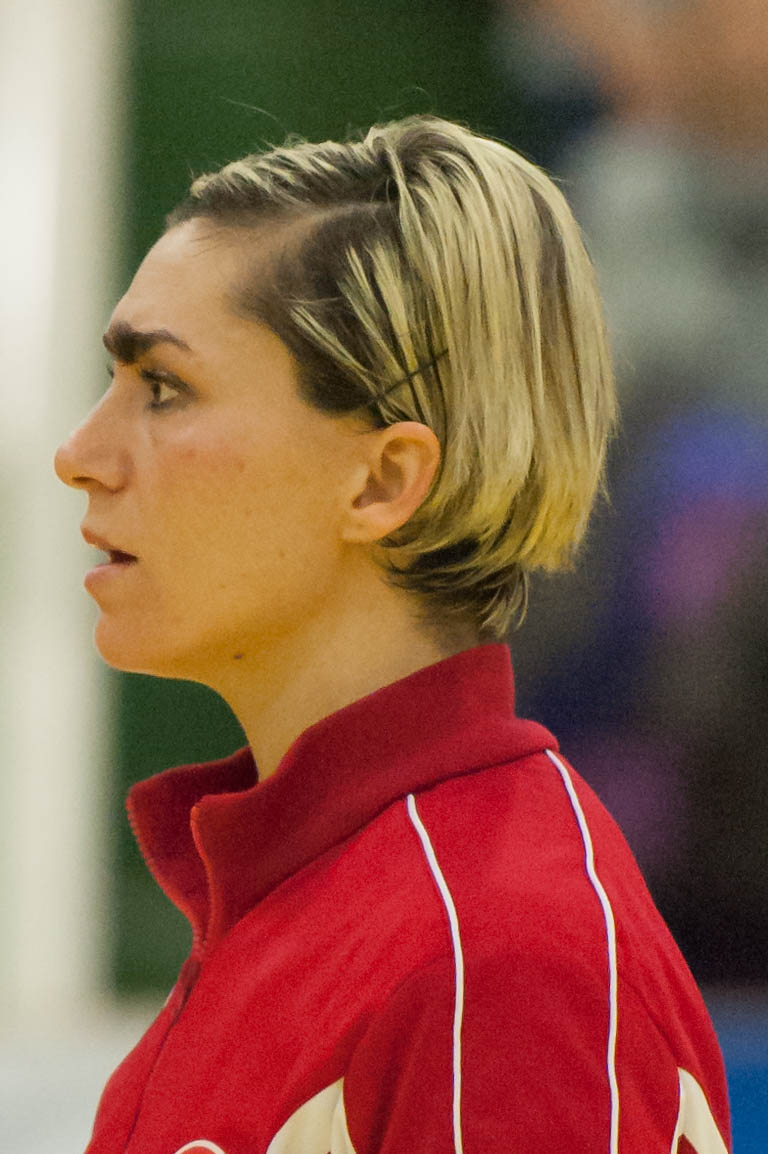
- Serpil İskenderoğlu at the 2015 World Women's Handball Championship qualification.

Personal information
- Born: July 15, 1982 (age 44) Istanbul, Turkey

Sport
- Sport: Handball
- Position: Field
- Current club: Kastamonu Bld. SK

Senior clubs
- Years: Team
- 1997–2003: (Turkey) T.M.O. SK Ankara
- 2003–2006: (Turkey) Anadolu Üniversitesi GSK
- 2006–2007: (Germany) 1. FC Nürnberg
- 2007–2008: (Turkey) Üsküdar Bld. SK
- 2008–2011: (Turkey) İzmir B.B. SK
- 2011–2015: (Turkey) Muratpaşa Bld. SK
- 2015–: (Turkey) Kastamonu Bld. GSK
National team
- Years: Team
- –: Turkey
Medal record
Women's handball
Representing Turkey
Islamic Solidarity Games
Silver medal – second place	2017 Baku	Team
Mediterranean Games
Silver medal – second place	2009 Pescara	Team
Turkish Women's Super League
Gold medal – first place	2011–2012 Super League	Team
Silver medal – second place	2010–2011 Super League	Team
Bronze medal – third place	2005–2006 Super League	Team
Silver medal – second place	2004–2005 Super League	Team
Silver medal – second place	2003–2004 Super League	Team
Gold medal – first place	2001–2002 Super League	Team
Turkish Women's Cup
Gold medal – first place	2004–2005 Super League	Team
Silver medal – second place	2003–2004 Super League	Team

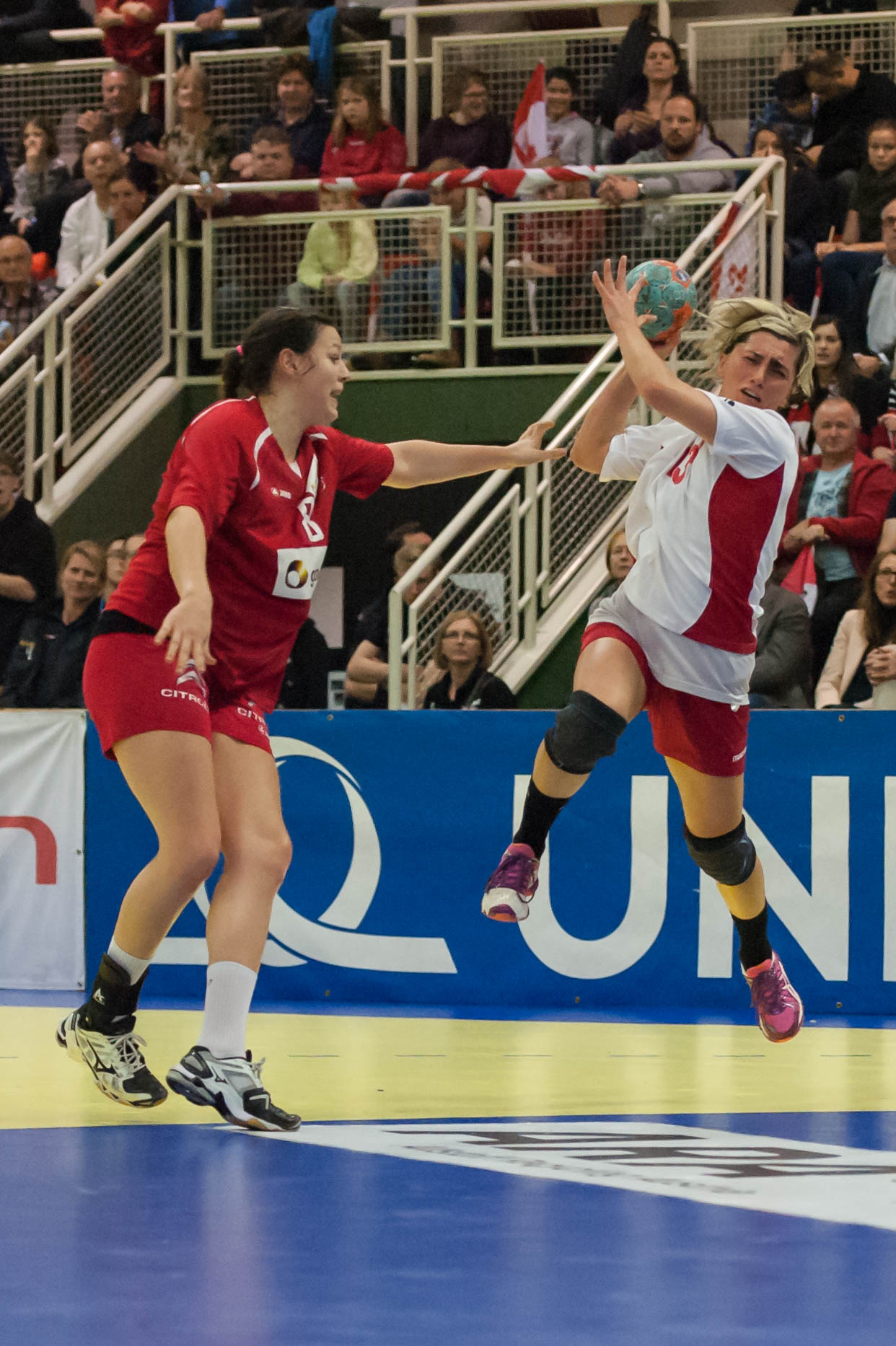
Serpil İskenderoğlu (right) attacking Austria at the 2015 World Women's Handball Championship European qualification match.

Serpil İskenderoğlu (born July 15, 1982) is a Turkish handballer in the field player position. She is a member of the Turkish national team.

She began playing handball at an early age in 1997 at the T.M.O. SK in Ankara. During her university years, İskenderoğlu was a member of the Anadolu Üniversitesi GSK between 2003 and 2006. Then, the German club 1. FC Nürnberg transferred her for one season in 2006–2007. After returning home, she played for Üsküdar Bld. SK in Istanbul before she transferred to İzmir Büyükşehir Belediyespor. Three seasons later in 2011–2012, she joined the Muratpaşa Bld. SK in Antalya. In July 2015, she was transferred by Kastamonu Bld. GSK for the 2015–16 season.

== Honours ==
=== Club ===
Turkish Women's Handball Super League

T.M.O. SK
Champions (1): 2001–2002.

Anadolu Üniversitesi GSK
Runners-up (2): 2003–04, 2004–05,
Third places (1): 2005–06.

İzmir Büyükşehir rld. GSK
Runners-up (1): 2010–11.

Muratpaşa Bld. SK
Champions (1): 2011–12.

Kastamonu Bld. GSK
Champions (5): 2016–17, 2018–19, 2020–21, 2021–22, 2022–23.
Runners-up (1) :2017–18.

Women's Handball Turkish Cup

Anadolu Üniversitesi GSK
Champions (1): 2004–05
Runners-up (1): 2003–04.

=== International ===
She was the member of the national team that won the silver medal at the 2009 Mediterranean Games in Pescara, Italy.

İskenderoğlu became the second most scorer player with 45 goals in six matches at the Group 4 2012 European Women's Handball Championship qualification.

In 2017, she won the silver medal with the national team at the Islamic Solidarity Games in Baku, Azerbaycan.
