= Halime Tuana Arslan =

Turkish handball player (born 2005)

Personal information
- Born: 23 September 2005 (age 21) Turkey

Sport
- Sport: Handball
- Position: Pivot
- Current club: Ankara Yurdum
- Number: 20

Senior clubs
- Years: Team
- 2022–2023: Konyaaltı Bld.
- 2023–2025: Anadolu Üniversitesi
- 2025–: Ankara Yurdum
National team
- Years: Team
- –: Turkey
Medal record
Representing Turkey
Women's Handball
Islamic Solidarity Games
Gold medal – first place	2025 Riyadh	Team

Halime Tuana Arslan (born 23 September 2005) is a Turkish women's handballer, who plays as pivot in the Turkish Women's Handball Super League for Ankara Yurdum and the Turkey national team.

== Club career ==
In the 2022–23 Super League season, she played for Konyaaltı Bld. in Antalya. Her team finished the league season as runners-up.

The next season, she transferred to Anadolu Üniversitesi in Eskişehir.

She joined Ankara Yurdum, which was newly established and entered the 2025–26 Super League season on a wild card basis.

== International career ==
=== Turkey women's U19 ===
Arslan was called up to the national U19 team end December 2022.

=== Turkey women's ===
In May 2025, Arslan was called up to the national team.

She was part of the national team, which won the gold medal at the 2025 Islamic Solidarity Games in Riyadh, Saudi Arabia.

== Personal life ==
Halime Tuana Arslan was born on 23 September 2005.

== Honours ==
=== Club ===
turkish Women's Handball Super League

Konyaaltı Bld.
Runners-up (1): 2022–23

=== International ===
Turkey women's national handball team

Islamic Solidarity Games
Champions (1): 2025
