= Döne Gül Bozdoğan =

Turkish handball player (born 1999)

Personal information
- Born: 3 February 1999 (age 27) Kayseri, Turkey
- Height: 1.72 m (5 ft 8 in)

Sport
- Sport: Handball
- Position: Center back
- Current club: Ankara Yurdum
- Number: 11

Senior clubs
- Years: Team
- 2016–2021: Muratpaşa Bld. SK
- 2022–2024: Konyaaltı Bld. SK
- 2024: Bursa BB SK
- 2024–2025: CSM Slatina
- 2025–: Ankara Yurdum
National team
- Years: Team
- 2018–: Turkey
Medal record
Representing Turkey
Women's Handball

Döne Gül Bozdoğan (born 3 February 1999) is a Turkish handballer, who playsas center back in the Turkish Women's Handball Super League for Ankara Yurdum and the Turkey national team. The 1.72 m (5 ft 8 in)-tall sportswoman plays in the center back position.

== Club career ==
She is 1.72 m (5 ft 8 in) tall, and plays in the center back position.

Bozdoğan started her handball playing career at the Antalya-based club Muratpaşa Bld. SK in 2016. Her team finished the 2017-18 Turkish Women's Handball Super League season as champion. She played at the 2018–19 Women's EHF Champions League qualifying, 2018–19 Women's EHF Champions League, and 2019–20 Women's EHF Cup.

After playing five seasons, she transferred to Konyaaltı Bld. SK also in Antalya, where she played from 2021 to 2023. With Konyaaltı Bld. SK, she played at the 2022-23 EHF Women's European Cup, at which her club became champion. She was also part of the team at the 2023–24 Women's EHF European Cup.

In the beginning of the 2023–24 season, she joined Bursa BB. In May 2024, she moved to Romania, and signed a deal with CSM Slatina. After one season, she returned home and transferred to Ankara Yurdum, which was newly established and entered the 2025–26 Super League season on a wild card basis.

== International career ==
At the 2018 Mediterranean Games in Tarragona, Spain, Bozdoğan was part of the national team, which placed fifth. She was part of the team at the 2024 European Women's Handball Championship, and 2025 World Women's Handball Championship – European qualification.

== Personal life ==
Döne Gül Bozdoğan was born in Kayseri, Turkey on 3 February 1999.

== Honours ==
Turkish Women's Handball Super League

Muratpaşa Bld. SK
Champions (1): 2017–18
Runners-up (1): 2018–19
Konyaaltı Bld. SK
Runners-up (1): 2022–23

EHF Women's European Cup

Konyaaltı Bld. SK
Champions (1): 2022–23
