= Çağla Yaman =

Turkish handball player

Personal information
- Full name: Çağla Yaman Yılmaz
- Born: April 1, 1981 (age 45) Istanbul, Turkey
- Height: 1.76 m (5 ft 9 in)

Sport
- Sport: Handball
- Position: Center Back
- Current club: İzmir BB GSK
- Number: 17

Senior clubs
- Years: Team
- 2001–2004: Üsküdar Bld. SK
- 2006–2007: CS Rulmentul Brasov
- 2007–2008: Üsküdar Bld. SK
- 2008–2009: İzmir BB GSK
- 2009–2013: Üsküdar Bld. SK
- 2013–2014: Muratpaşa Bld. SK
- 2014–: İzmir BB GSK
National team
- Years: Team
- –: Turkey

Çağla Yaman, a.k.a. Çağla Yılmaz, (born April 1, 1981) is a Turkish women's handballer, who plays in the Turkish Women's Handball Super League for İzmir BB GSK, and the Turkey national team. The 1.76 m (5 ft 9 in)-tall sportswoman plays in the center back position.

== Playing career ==
=== Club ===
She played in her hometown for Üsküdar Bld. SK between 2001 and 2004 before she moved to Romania and signed with CS Rulmentul Brasov for the 2006–07 season. After one season, she returned home, rejoining her former team Üsküdar Belediyespor. In the 2008–09 season, she transferred to İzmir BB GSK. Yaman returned to Üsküdar Bld. SK again after one season. In the 2013–14 season, she was with Muratpaşa Bld. SK in Antalya. She transferred in 2014 to İzmir BB GSK again.

In November 2007, Turkey Handball Federation's Disciplinary Committee imposed on Çağla Yaman a penalty of six months for failing to attend the national team's camp grounds without notice.

She took part at the Women's EHF Challenge Cup (2001–02, 2008–09, 2012–13, 2014–15 and 2015–16), Women's EHF Cup (2002–03, 2006–07 and 2007–08), Women's EHF Cup Winners' Cup (2003–04, 2009–10, 2010–11, 2011–12 and 2013–14) as well as Women's EHF Champions League (2006–07, 2011–12 and 2013–14).

=== International ===
Çağla Yaman is part of the Turkey women's national handball team.

She was also member of the Turkey women's national beach handball team.

== Honours ==
Turkish Women's Handball Super League

- Winners (3): 2003–04, 2010–11, 2013–14
- Runners-up (4): 2007–08, 2009–10, 2011–12, 2012–13
