= Sümeyye Durdu =

Turkish handball player (born 2007)

Personal information
- Born: 21 February 2007 (age 19) Turkey

Sport
- Sport: Handball
- Position: Right wing
- Current club: Ankara Yurdum
- Number: 28

Senior clubs
- Years: Team
- 2024–2025: Adasokağı
- 2025–: Ankara Yurdum
National team
- Years: Team
- 2023–2024: Turkey girls' U17
- 2025–: Turkey
Medal record
Representing Turkey
Women's Handball
Islamic Solidarity Games
Gold medal – first place	2025 Riyadh	Team

Sümeyye Durdu (born 21 February 2007) is a Turkish women's handballer, who plays as right winger in the Turkish Women's Handball Super League for Ankara Yurdum and the Turkey national team.

== Club career ==
Durdu played for Adasokağı in Adana.

She joined Ankara Yurdum, which was newly established and entered the 2025–26 Super League season on a wild card basis.

== International career ==
=== Turkey girls' U17 ===
Durdu played for Turkey girls' national U17 team at the Mediterranean U17 Handball 16th Championship 2023 held in Nafplio, Greece. Turkey girls' U17 team finished the tournament at fourth place.

At the 2023 European Women's U-17 Handball Championship's Second Level tournament, she won the silver medal with her team.

In October 2024, she was called up to the national team, and played at the 2025 European Women's U-17 Handball Championship qualification in Ankara, Turkey.

=== Turkey women's ===
In May 2025, Arslan was called up to the national team.

She was part of the national team, which won the gold medal at the 2025 Islamic Solidarity Games in Riyadh, Saudi Arabia.

== Personal life ==
Sümeyye Durdu was born on 21 February 2007.

== Honours ==
=== International ===
Turkey women's national handball team

Islamic Solidarity Games
Champions (1): 2025

Turkey girls' national handball U17 team

European Women's U-17 Handball Championship Second Level
Runners-up (19: 2023
