= Buğu Sönmez =

Turkish handball player (born 2006)

Personal information
- Born: 1 January 2006 (age 20) Edremit, Balıkesir,Turkey
- Height: 1.82 m (6 ft 0 in)

Sport
- Sport: Handball
- Position: Left back
- Current club: Ankara Yurdum
- Number: 14

Senior clubs
- Years: Team
- 2020: Araç Bld. SK
- 2021–2025: Anadolu Üniversitesi GSK
- 2025–: Ankara Yurdum
National team
- Years: Team
- 2023: Turkey U-17
- 2023: Turkey U-19
- 2024–: Turkey
Medal record
Representing Turkey
Women's Handball
Islamic Solidarity Games
Gold medal – first place	2025 Riyadh	Team

Buğu Sönmez (born 1 January 2006) is a Turkish handballer, who plays as Left back in the Turkish Women's Handball Super League for Ankara Yurdum and the Turkey national team. The 1.82 m (6 ft 0 in)-tall sportswoman plays in the left back position.

== Club career ==
Sönmez is 1.82 m (6 ft 0 in) tall, and plays in the left back position.

She started her handball playing career in Kastamonu at her age of 14 with the encouragement of her teacher. She entered the local club Araç Bld. SK in the 2020–2021 season. In 2020, her family moved to Eskişehir, and she transferred to Anadolu Üniversitesi GSK team. In the 2022–23, and the 2024–25 Turkish Women's Handball Super League season, she became top goal scorer with 190 goals netted.

She joined Ankara Yurdum, which was newly established and entered the 2025–26 Super League season on a wild card basis.

== International career ==
Sönmez became a member of the Turkey U-17 team, and played at the 2023 European Women's U-17 Handball Championship.

She was admitted to the Turkey U-19 team, and participated at the 2023 European Women's U-19 Handball Championship.

She was selected to the Turkey national team, and played at Turkey's first participation in the European championship, the preliminary round of the 2024 European Women's Handball Championship, and later at the 2025 World Women's Handball Championship – European qualification matches.

She played in the national team, which won the gold medal at the 2025 Islamic Solidarity Games in Riyadh, Saudi Arabia.

== Honours ==
=== Individual ===
Turkish Women's Handball Super League

Anadolu Üniversitesi GSK
Top goalscorer (2): 2022–23, 2024–25

=== International ===
Turkey
(gold) 2025 Islamic Solidarity Games
