= Seval Bozova =

Turkish handball player (born 2006)

Personal information
- Born: 28 January 2006 (age 20) Antalya, Turkey
- Height: 1.70 m (5 ft 7 in)

Sport
- Sport: Handball
- Position: Right wing
- Current club: Üsküdar Bld.
- Number: 3

Senior clubs
- Years: Team
- 2021–2022: Konyaaltı Bld.
- 2024–: Üsküdar Bld.
National team
- Years: Team
- 2022–2023: Turkey girls' U17
- 2025: Turkey women's U19
- 2025–: Turkey
Medal record
Women's Handball
Representing Turkey
Islamic Solidarity Games
| Gold medal – first place | 2025 Riyadh | Team |

Seval Bozova (born 28 January 2006) is a Turkish handballer, who plays as right winger in the Turkish Women's Handball Super League for Üsküdar Bld. and the Turkey national handball team.

== Club career ==
Bozova played in the 2021–22 season in her hometown for Konyaaltı Bld..

For the 2024–25 Turkish Women's Handball Super League season, she joined Üsküdar Bld. in Istanbul. She played at the 2025–26 Women's EHF European Cup.

She is 1.70 m (5 ft 7 in) tall, and plays in the right wing position.

== International career ==
=== Turkey girls' U17 ===
In 2022, Bozova was selected to the candidate squad of the Turkey girşs' national U17 team for the preparation camps. She played at the 2023 European Women's U-17 Handball Championship's Second Level matches. The national team won the silver medal.

=== Turkey women's U19 ===
She was part of the Turkey women's national U19 team, which placed 16th at the 2025 European Women's U-19 Handball held in Podgorica, Montenegro.

=== Turkey women's ===
Bozova played in the national team, which won the gold medal at the 2025 Islamic Solidarity Games in Riyadh, Saudi Arabia.

== Personal life ==
Seval Bozova was born in Antalya, Turkey, on 28 January 2006.

== Honours ==
=== International ===
Turkey women's national handball team

Islamic Solidarity Games
(gold) (1): 2025

Turkey girls' nationalU17 handball team

European Women's U-17 Handball Championship's Second Level
(silver) (1): 2023
