= Sude Karademir =

Turkish handball player (born 2001)

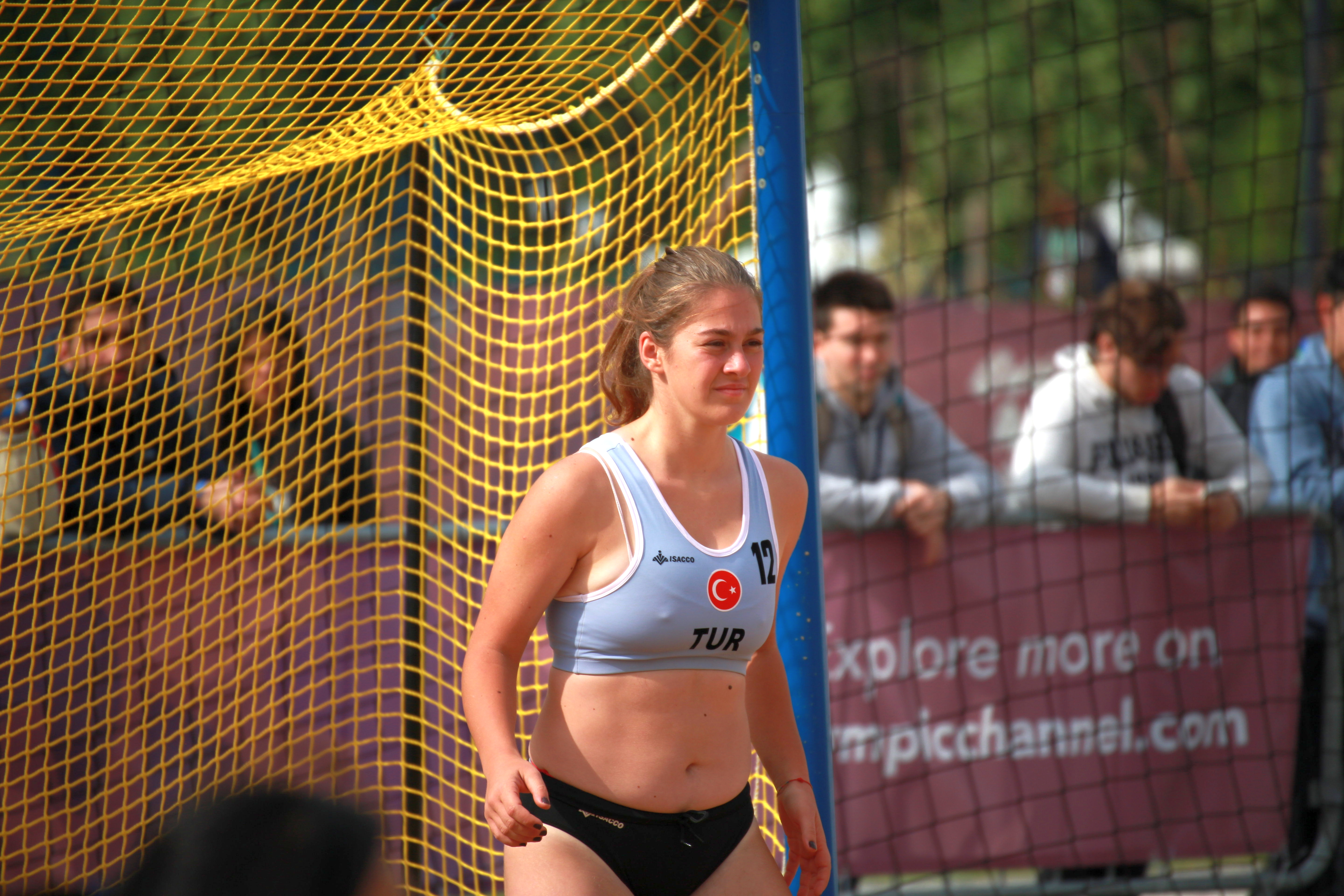
- Sude Karademir (October 2018)

Personal information
- Born: 6 February 2001 (age 25) Istanbul, Turkey
- Height: 1.73 m (5 ft 8 in)

Sport
- Sport: Handball
- Current club: Ankara Yurdum
- Number: 12

Senior clubs
- Years: Team
- 2015–2023: Üsküdar Bld.
- 2023–2025: Yalıkavak
- 2025–: Ankara Yurdum
National team
- Years: Team
- 2018: Turkey U-19 beach handball
- –: Turkey
Medal record
Women's Handball
Representing Turkey
Islamic Solidarity Games
Gold medal – first place	2025 Riyadh	Team

Sude Karademir (born 6 February 2001) is a Turkish handballer, who plays as goalkeeper in the Turkish Women's Handball Super League for Yalıkavak and the Turkey national handball team,.

== Club career ==
Karademir is 1.73 m (5 ft 8 in) tall and plays as goalkeeper.

She started playing handball joining the Istanbul-based club Üsküdar Bld.. She appeared for Üsküdar Bld. last time in the 2022–23 Turkish Women's Handball Super League season.

In the beginning of the 2023–24 Turkish Super League season, she transferred to Yalıkavak in Bodrum. That season, her team became champion. Her team repated the champions title in the 2024–25 season.

=== Ankara Yurdum ===
She joined Ankara Yurdum, which was newly established and entered the 2025–26 Super League season on a wild card basis.

== International career ==
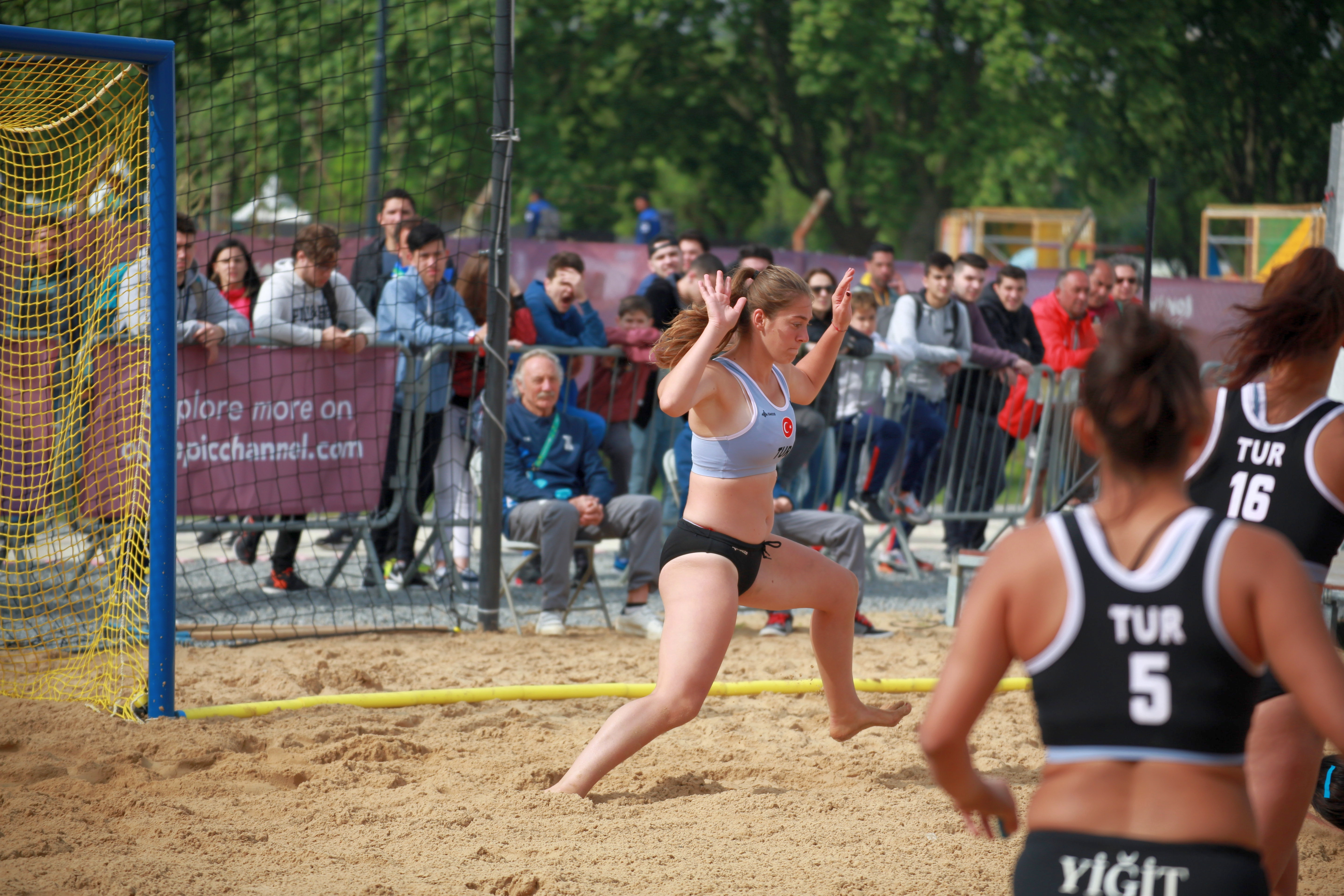
Sude Karademir (12), goalkeeper of the Turkey women's national U-19 beach handball team at the 2018 Summer Youth Olympics.

Karademir played for the Turkey women's national beach handball team at the 2018 Summer Youth Olympics held in Buenos Aires, Argentina.

In November 2023, she was selected to the A2 national team to participate at the national team camp to be held in Ankara in December.

She played in the national team, which won the gold medal at the 2025 Islamic Solidarity Games in Riyadh, Saudi Arabia.

== Personal life ==
Sude Karademir was born in Istanbul, Turkey, on 6 February 2001. She was raised in İsmailbeyli village of Görele District in Giresun Province.

== Honours ==
=== Club ===
Turkish Women's Handball Super League

Yalıkavak
Champions (2): 2023–24, 2024–25

Turkish Women's Handball Super Cup

Yalıkavak
Winners (2): 2023, 2024
Runners-up (1): 2025

=== International ===
Turkey women's national handball team

Islamic Solidarity Games
Champions (1): 2025
