= Sinem Vatan Güney =

Turkish handball player (born 1996)

Personal information
- Born: 26 November 1996 (age 29) Turkey
- Height: 1.70 m (5 ft 7 in)

Sport
- Sport: Handball
- Position: Left back
- Current club: Üsküdar Bld.
- Number: 9

Senior clubs
- Years: Team
- 2021–2022: Anadolu Üniversitesi
- 2022–2023: Konyaaltı Bld.
- 2023–2024: Kastamonu Bld.
- 2024–: Üsküdar Bld.
National team
- Years: Team
- 2022–: Turkey
Medal record
Representing Turkey
Women's Handball
Islamic Solidarity Games
| Gold medal – first place | 2025 Riyadh | Team |

Sinem Vatan Güney (née Sinem Vatan; 26 November 1996) is a Turkish women's handballer, who plays as left back in the Turkish Women's Handball Super League for Üsküdar Bld. and the Turkey national team.

== Club career ==
Vatan Güney played in the Super League for Anadolu Üniversitesi in Eskişehir (2021–22), Konyaaltı Bld. in Antalya (2022–23) and Kastamonu Bld. (2023–24) before she in the 2024–25 season transferred to the Istanbul-based club Üsküdar Bld..

She was injured while playing for Anadolu Üniversitesi, and underwent an orthopedic surgery in a hospital at Istanbul in March 2022. Her team Konyaaltı Bld. finished the 2022–23 season as runners-up.

== International career ==
Vatan was admitted to the national team in February 2022, and played at the 2022 European Women's Handball Championship qualification.

She was part of the national team, which won the gold medal at the 2025 Islamic Solidarity Games in Riyadh, Saudi Arabia.

== Personal life ==
Sinem Vatan was born on 26 November 1996.

== Honours ==
=== Club ===
Turkish Women's Handball Super League

Konyaaltı Bld.
Runners-up (1): 2022–23

=== International ===
Turkey women's national handball team

Islamic Solidarity Games
Champions (1): 2025
