= Burcu Pirinçci =

Turkish handball player

Personal information
- Full name: Burcu Pirinçci Dindar
- Born: February 8, 1990 (age 36) Turgutlu, Turkey
- Height: 1.74 m (5 ft 9 in)

Sport
- Sport: Handball
- Position: Center Back
- Current club: İzmir BB GSK
- Number: 10

Senior clubs
- Years: Team
- 2005–2008: Anadolu Üniversitesi GSK
- 2008–: İzmir BB GSK
National team
- Years: Team
- –: Turkey

Burcu Pirinçci, aka Burcu Dindar, (born February 8, 1990) is a Turkish women's handballer, who plays in the Turkish Women's Handball Super League for İzmir BB GSK, and the Turkey national team. The 1.74 m (5 ft 9 in)-tall sportswoman plays in the center back position.

In 2013, Burcu Pirinçci married Hasan Dindar, a goalkeeper of the Yeni Bornovaspor football team.

She played for Anadolu Üniversitesi GSK from 2005 to 2008 before she transferred to İzmir BB GSK.

She took part in the Women's EHF Cup Winners' Cups (2005–06, 2011–12 and 2012–13), Women's EHF Cup (2006–07, 2009–10 and 2010–11) as well as Women's EHF Challenge Cup (2007–08, 2008–09, 2014–15 and 2015–16).
