= Emine Gökdemir =

Turkish handball player (born 2003)

Personal information
- Born: 1 February 2003 (age 23) Aksaray, Turkey
- Height: 1.63 m (5 ft 4 in)

Sport
- Sport: Handball
- Position: Right wing
- Current club: Kastamonu Bld. GSK
- Number: 87

Youth career
- Years: Team
- –: Aksaray Bld. GSK

Senior clubs
- Years: Team
- 2018–2022: Aksaray Bld. GSK
- 2022–: Kastamonu Bld. GSK
National team
- Years: Team
- –: Turkey
Medal record
Representing Turkey
Women's Handball
Islamic Solidarity Games
Gold medal – first place	2021 Konya	Team

Emine Gökdemir (born 1 February 2003) is a Turkish women's handballer, who plays on the right wing for Kastamonu Bld. GSK in the Turkish Women's Handball Super League, and the Turkey national team.

== Personal life ==
Emine Gökdemir was born in Aksaray, Turkey on 1 February 2003.

== Club career ==
Gökdemir is 1.63 m (5 ft 4 in) tall at 50 kg (110 lb). She plays in the right wing position.

=== Aksaray Bld. GSK ===
Gökdemir started handball playing at Aksaray Bld. SK in her hometown. She appeared in four seasons of the second-tier Turkish First League from 2018–19 until including 2021–22.

=== Kastamonu Bld. GSK ===
For the 2022–23 Super League season, she transferred to Kasıtamonu Bld. GSK. She was named Golden Seven (Turkish: Altın Yedi) member of the 2022–23 Super League season by the Turkey Handball Federation.

She took part at the 2022–23 EHF Champions League.

== International career ==
Gökdemir is a member of the Turkey women's national handball team. In 2022, she won the gold medal at the Islamic Solidarity Games in Konya, Turkey.

== Honours ==
=== Individual ===
Turkish Women's Handball Super League

Kastamonu Bld. GSK
Golden Seven member (1): 2022–23

=== Club ===
Turkish Women's Handball Cup

Bursa BBSK
Winners (1): 2025

=== International ===
Turkey women's national handball team

Islamic Solidarity Games
Champion (1): 2021.
