= Gülcan Tügel =

Turkish handball player (born 2000)

Personal information
- Nationality: Turkish
- Born: 10 July 2000 (age 26) Van, Turkey
- Height: 1.73 m (5 ft 8 in)

Sport
- Sport: Handball
- Position: Center back
- Current club: Yalıkavak
- Number: 10

Youth career
- Years: Team
- 2015–2016: Gazi Pasifik SK
- 2016–2017: Ankara Metropol SK

Senior clubs
- Years: Team
- 2018–2019: Çankaya Eğitim GSK
- 2018–2019: Yalıkavak
- 2019–2024: Yenimahalle Bld.
- 2024–2025: Adasokağı
- 2025–: Yalıkavak
National team
- Years: Team
- 2016–2017: Turkey U-17
- 2018: Turkey U-19
- –: Turkey
Medal record
Representing Turkey
Women's Handball
Islamic Solidarity Games
Gold medal – first place	2025 Riyadh	Team
Gold medal – first place	2021 Konya	Team

Gülcan Tügel (born 10 July 2000) is a Turkish handballer, who plays as center back for Yalıkavak in the Turkish Super League, and the Turkey national team.

== Personal life ==
Gülcan Tügel was born in Van, Turkey, on 10 July 2000.

== Club career ==
Tügel is 1.73 m (5 ft 8 in) tall. Prior to her current playing position as center back, she started as a right back, and then played as a left back.

Tügel played in her youth years for Gazi Pasifik SK in 2015–16, and for Ankara Metropol SK in 2016–17. She then transferred to Çankaya Eğitim GSK and played in the 2018–19 season.

During the break time of the 2018–19 season, she played in ten matches for the Bodrum-based club Yalıkavak.

Tügel moved to Yenimahalle Bld. to play in the 2019–20 Turkish Super League. She remained in her hometown club in the following seasons of 2020–21, 2021–22, and 2022–23. She experienced her team's third rank after the end of 4he 2020–21 league season.

She took part at the 2019–20 EHF Challenge Cup, and the Women's EHF European Cup in 2021–22, and 2022–23.

Tügel transferred to the Adana-based club Adasokağı in the 2024–25 Super League season. Her team became runner-up defeated by the defending champion Yalaıkavak in the play-off finals by 3-1.

In the 2025–26 Super League season, she returned to her former club Yalıkavak.

== International career ==
In March 2016, Tügel was selected to the Turkey girls' national U-17 team to play at the 2016 Women's Mediterranean Handball Championships in Žabljak, Montenegro. In August 2017, she was invited to the training camp of the Turkey girls' U-17 team to play at the Division 2 of the 2017 European Women's U-17 Handball Championship.

End December 2018, she was selected to the Turkey women's national U-19 team.

Tügel is a member of the Turkey national team. In 2022, she was part of the national team, which became champion at the 5th Islamic Solidarity Games in Konya, Turkey. She played at the 2022 Mediterranean Games in Oran, Algeria. She participated in the 2023 Handball Championship – European qualification

She played in the national team, which won the gold medal at the 2025 Islamic Solidarity Games in Riyadh, Saudi Arabia.

== Honours ==
=== Club ===
Turkish Women's Handball Super League

Runners-up (2): 2023–24 (Yenimahalle Bld.), 2024–25 (Adasokağı)
Third place (1): 2020–21 (Yenimahalle Bld.)

=== International ===
Turkey women's national handball team

Islamic Solidarity Games
Champions (2): 2021 , 2025
