= Sude (name) =

Sude is a feminine Turkish given name. In Turkish, it means "pure" or "blessed water".

== People ==
=== Given name ===
- Sude Nur Aslan (born 2007), Turkish boxer
- Sude Çifçi (born 2004), Turkish handballer
- Sude Hacımustafaoğlu (born 2002), Turkish volleyball player
- Sude Karademir (born 2001), Turkish handballer
- Sude Nur Sözüdoğru (born 2002), Turkish football player
- Sude Yaren Uzunçavdar (born 2005), Turkish taekwondo athlete
- Sude Yılmaz (born 2002), Turkish basketball player
- Zeynep Sude Demirel (born 1996), Turkish volleyball player

=== Surname ===
- Julia Sude (born 1987), German beach volleyball player
- Ulrich Sude (born 1956), German football player
