= Sude =

Sude may refer to:

- Sude (name), female given name

== Places ==
- Sude, Ethiopia, a woreda (administrative division)
- Sude (river), Germany

== See also ==
- Kleine Sude, part of the Schmaar river, Germany
