= Duygu Sakallı =

Turkish handball player

Personal information
- Born: June 13, 1991 (age 35) Urla, İzmir, Turkey
- Height: 1.72 m (5 ft 8 in)

Sport
- Sport: Handball
- Position: Left Wing
- Current club: Ardeşen GSK
- Number: 14

Senior clubs
- Years: Team
- 2010–2013: İzmir BB GSK
- 2014–2015: Genç Uşak SK
- 2015–: Ardeşen GSK
National team
- Years: Team
- –: Turkey

Duygu Sakallı (born June 13, 1991) is a Turkish women's handballer, who plays in the Turkish Women's Handball Super League for Ardeşen GSK, and the Turkey national team. The 1.72 m (5 ft 8 in)-tall sportswoman plays in the left wing position.

Sakallı played for İzmir Büyükşehir Belediyesi GSK between 2010 and 2013. She transferred to Genç Uşak SK in August 2014, and after one season to Ardeşen GSK in July 2015.

She took part in the Women's EHF Cup (2010–11) and the Women's EHF Cup Winners' Cup (2011–12, 2012–13 and 2015–16).
