= Işıkhan =

Işıkhan is a Turkish surname, and it may refer to:

- Büşra Işıkhan (born 1999), Turkish female handball player
- Vedat Işıkhan (born 1966), Turkish academic, politician and Ministry of Labour and Social Security
