= Çamlıca Sports Hall =

Sport venue in Istanbul, Turkey

Çamlıca Sports Hall Çamlıca Spor Salonu
- Interactive map of Çamlıca Sports Hall; Çamlıca Spor Salonu
- Location: Istanbul, Turkey
- Coordinates: 41.02386°N 29.02352°E
- Owner: Üsküdar Municipality
- Capacity: 836
- Parking: 30

Construction
- Opened: 2014; 12 years ago

Tenants
- Çamlıca Sport School; Üsküdar Women's Handball

Çamlıca Sports Hall (Turkish: Çamlıca Spor Salonu) is a multi-purpose indoor sports venue in Istanbul, Turkey. Owned by the Üsküdar Municipality, it was opened in 2014 and is used for basketball, handball, volleyball competitions and pilates exercise for youth.

== Overview ==
Çamlıca Sorts Hall is situated at Kısıklı Mah., Hamam Sok.2/2 in Üsküdar District of the Asian part of Istanbul, Turkey. Owned by the Municipality of Üsküdar and opened in 2014, the venue has 1,050 m^{2} (11,300 sq ft) space. It features a cafeteria. It is run by the Çamlıca Sport School of the municipality. It has a seating capacity for 836 spectators. The parking lot can hold 30 vehicles.

== Usage ==
The sports hall is a venue for basketball, handball, volleyball competitions, and is used for pilates exercise by the youth over 15-year of age of the sport school. It is home to the women's handball team Üsküdar Bld., which compete in the Turkish Women's Handball Super League.

== See also ==
- List of indoor arenas in Turkey
