= Esin Sağdıç =

Turkish handball player

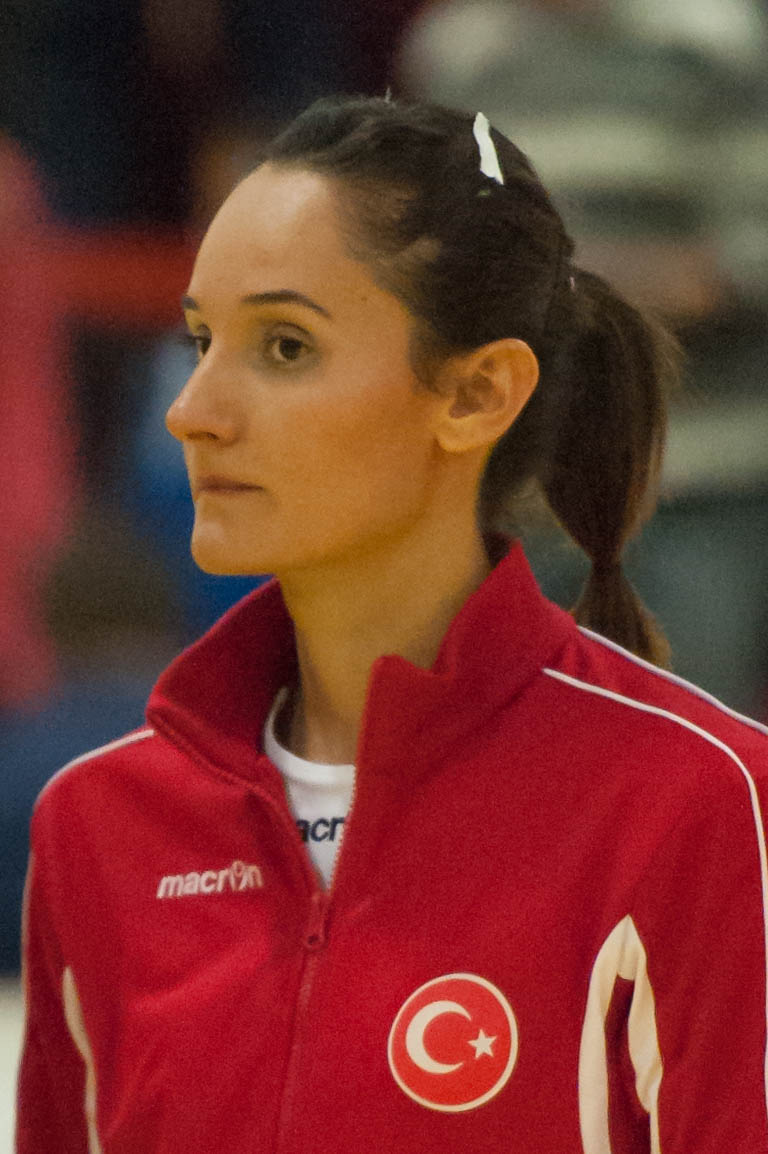

Personal information
- Nationality: Turkish
- Born: 11 January 1988 (age 38) İzmir, Turkey
- Height: 168 cm (5 ft 6 in)

Sport
- Sport: Handball
- Position: Right wing
- Current club: Muratpaşa Bld. SK

Senior clubs
- Years: Team
- 2007: Altay SK
- 2008–2014: İzmir B.B. SK
- 2014–: Muratpaşa Bld. SK
National team
- Years: Team
- 2008–present: Turkey
Medal record
Women's handball
Turkish Women's Super League
| Silver medal – second place | 2010–11 | Team |

Esin Sağdıç (born 11 January 1988) is a Turkish female handballer playing in right wing position. The 168 cm (5 ft 6 in) tall sportswoman at 55 kg (121 lb) is a member of the Turkish national team as well as Muratpaşa Bld. SK.

== Life ==
She was born on 11 January 1988 in İzmir.

== Achievements ==
=== National ===
- 2010–11 İzmir Büyükşehir Belediyespor TWHSL Silver

Legend:

- TWHSL Turkish Women's Handball Super League
