= Ayşenur Sormaz =

Turkish handball player (born 2000)

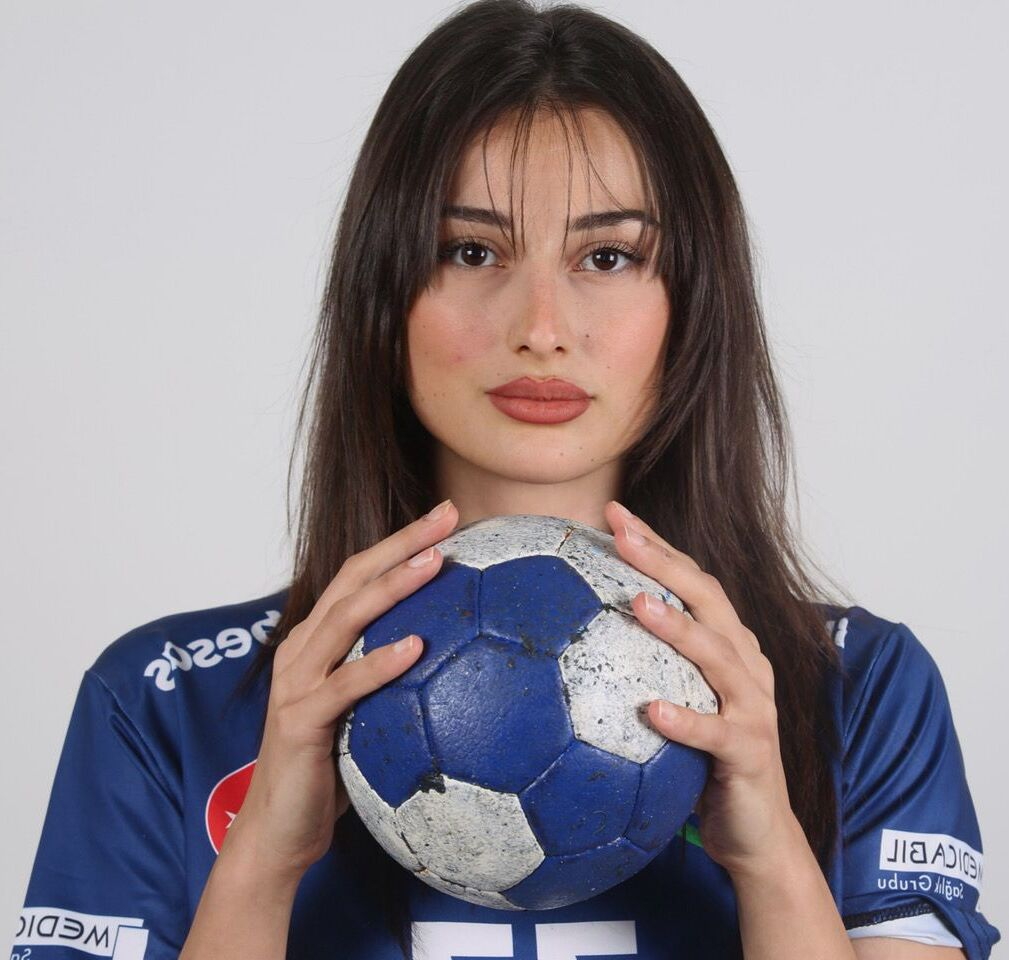

Personal information
- Nationality: Turkish
- Born: 10 May 2000 (age 26) Ardeşen, Rize, Turkey
- Height: 1.76 m (5 ft 9 1/2 in)

Sport
- Sport: Handball
- Position: Left back, center back
- Current club: Ankara Yurdum

Senior clubs
- Years: Team
- 2018–2020: Muratpaşa Bld. SK
- 2021–2022: Ego Spor
- 2022: Anadolu Üniversitesi GSK
- 2023–2025: Ariosto Pallamano Ferrara
- 2025–: Ankara Yurdum
National team
- Years: Team
- 2017: Turkey U-17
- 2019: Turkey U-19
- 2019–: Turkey handball
- 2018–: Turkey beach handball
Medal record
Representing Turkey
Women's handball
Islamic Solidarity Games
Gold medal – first place	2021 Konya	Team

Ayşenur Sormaz (born 10 May 2000) is a Turkish handballer, who plays as center back in the Turkish Women's Handball Super League for Ankara Yurdum and the Turkey national handball team.

== Club career ==
Sormaz is 1.76 m (5 ft 9 1/2 in) tall at 65 kg (143 lb). She plays in the left back, and sometimes in the center back position.

She played in the Turkish Super League (Turkish: Türkiye Kadınlar Hentbol Süper Ligi, TKHSL) for Muratpaşa Bld. SK (2018–2020) in Antalya, Ego Spor (2021) in Ankara and Anadolu Üniversitesi GSK (2022) in Eskişehir. She scored a total of 53 goals in 24 matches played. She was with Muratpaşa Bld. SK when her team became runners-up in the 2018–19 TKHSL season, and won the 2018–19 Turkish Cup (Turkish: Hentbol Kadınlar Türkiye Kupası) ), defeating the league champion Kastamonu Bld. GSK

In January 2023, the Italian Serie A1-club Ariosto Pallamano Ferrara announced that they had signed a deal with her.

After returning home, she joined Ankara Yurdum, which was newly established and entered the 2025–26 Super League season on a wild card basis.

== International career ==
Sormaz played in the 2017 European Handball Women's U-17 EHF Championship for non-Euro participants in Klaipėda, Lithuania, where she finished third with Turkey U-17. Two years later, she played in the same place at the U-19 tournament and came third again.

Admitted to the Turkey national handball team, she took part in 2019 at the 2020 European Championship qualification, which was cancelled due to the COVID-19 pandemic. She played at the 2022 European Championship qualification. In 2022, at the 5th Islamic Solidarity Games in Konya, Turkey, she was with the national team, which became champion.

She is also a member of the Turkey national beach handball team. She participated at the 2018 Summer Youth Olympics in Buenos Aires, Argentina.

== Personal life ==
Ayşenur Sormaz was born in Ardeşen district of Rize Province, northeastern Turkey on 10 May 2000.

== Honours ==
=== Club ===
Turkish Women's Handball Super League
Muratpaşa Bld. SK

Runners-up (1): 2018–19

Women's Handball Turkish Cup
Muratpaşa Bld. SK

Winners (1): 2018–19

=== International ===
Turkey women's national U-17 handball team
European Handball Women's U-17 EHF Championshipfor non-Euro participants

Third places (1): 2017

Turkey women's national U-19 handball team
European Handball Women's U-19 EHF Championshipfor non-Euro participants

Third places (1): 2019

Turkey women's national handball team
Islamic Solidarity Games

Champions (1): 2021
