= Odunpazarı S.K. =

Turkish handball club

- Full name: Odunpazarı Spor Kulübü
- Founded: 1968; 57 years ago
- Arena: Porsuk Sports Hall
- President: Alper Kayar
- League: Turkish Women's Handball Super League
- 2024–25: 2nd
- Club colours

Location of Odunpazarı S.K. in Turkey

Odunğazarı S.K. (Turkish: Odunpazarı Spor Kulübü) is a women's handball club based in Odunpazarı District of Eskişehir Province, Turkey. The team competes in the Turkish Super League. Club president is Alper Kayar.

== History ==
Odunpazarı Sports Club was founded at Odunpazarı District of Eskişehir Province in 1968. The women's handball team is nicknamed "Şehirin Kızları" (literally: Girls of the city).

Initially, the team competed in the Turkish Women's Handball Second League. Following the 2020–21 season, they were promoted to the Turkish Women's Handball First League. In the fourth season, they finished the 2024–25 First League season as runners-up, and was promoted to the Turkish Women's Handball Super League in the 2025–256 season.

== Colors ==
The club colors are blue and white.

== Arena ==
Odunpazarı play their home matches at Porsuk Sports Hall located in Odunpazrı District in Eskişehir.

== Current squad ==
Team members at the 2025–26 Turkish Women's Handball Super League:

- 1 (Turkey) Ümmügülsüm Bedel (RB)
- 5 (Turkey) Nur Aleyna Köse
- 7 (Turkey) Selen Köklü
- 8 (Turkey) Güliz Kahraman
- 9 (Turkey) Rabia Er (LP)
- 10 (Turkey) Kübranur Rallas
- 11 (Turkey) Zeynep Nur Kapaklıkaya (RB)
- 12 (Angola) Cafumo Carlos (GK)
- 18 (North Macedonia) Elena Gjeorgjievska (RB)
- 21 (Turkey) Betül Yılmaz (LB)
- 22 (Turkey) Öznur Özdemir
- 25 (Turkey) Gülsüm Mihrap (RW)
- 26 (Turkey) Diğdem Hoşgör (LW)
- 77 (Turkey) Esra Ertap Koyunoğlu (LP) (C)
- 99 (Turkey) Ceren Demirçelen (LP)

== Honours ==
Turkish Women's Handball First League
Runners-up (1): 2024–25
