= Porsuk Sports Hall =

Multi-purpose indoor sports venue in Eskişehir, Turkey

- Interactive map of Porsuk Sports Hall
- Coordinates: 39.75357°N 30.49813°E
- Operator: Anadolu University; Eskişehir Technical University
- Capacity: 3,000

Tenant
- Odunpazarı S.K.

Porsuk Sports Hall (Turkish: Porsuk Spor Salonu) is a multi-purpose indoor sports venue located in Eskişehir, Turkey. It is named after Porsuk River, which crosses the city.

Porsuk Sports Hall is situated at Büyükdere, Dilberler Sok. 5 in Odunpazarı district of Eskişehir. It has a covered area of 220 m^{2} (2,400 sq ft). It has a seating capacity of 3,000. The venue is operated by the Faculty of Sport science at Anadolu University and Eskişehir Technical University. It is home to the handball and volleyball teams of both universities. In 2015, the sports hall underwent months-long renovation works that extended the seat capacity from 2,000 to 3,000, and completed before the league season.

Apart from handball and volleyball league matches, the multi-purpose venue hosts also futsal, wrestling, kickboxing, chess tournaments mostly at youth level, music concerts, trade fairs and foreign circus shows.

The Women's Handball Super League club Odunpazarı S.K. play their home matches in the Porsuk Sports Hall.
