= Ankara Yurdum SK =

Turkish handball club

- Full name: Ankara Yurdum Spor Kulübü
- Founded: 2025; 1 year ago
- League: Turkish Women's Handball Super League

Ankara Yurdum SK (Turkish: Ankara Yurdum Spor Kulübü), also known as MC Sistem Yurdum SK for sponsorship reasons, is a women's handball club founded in 2025 and based in Ankara, Turkey. The team competes in the Turkish Super League.

== History ==
Ankara Yurdum SK was founded in 2025 at Ankara, Turkey. In 2025, the Turkish Handball Federation introduced the invitation of clubs to the Women's Super League by wild card for the first time. Ankara Yurdum was the only club to enter the 2025–26 Super League season on the basis of wild card. The club is sponsored by the Ankara-based company MC Sistem.

== Current squad ==
Team members at the 2025–26 Turkish Women's Handball Super League:

Head coach: (Spain) David Ginesta Montes

- 9 (Turkey) Berfin Yürüyücü (GK)
- 10 (Turkey) Melike Kasapoğlu (LP)
- 11 (Turkey) Döne Gül Bozdoğan (CB)
- 12 (Turkey) Sude Karademir (GK)
- 14 (Turkey) Buğu Sönmez (LB)
- 18 (Turkey) İrem Asya Lahaçlar (GK)
- 20 (Turkey) Halime Tuana Arslan (LP)
- 22 (Turkey) Kübranur Cesur (RB)
- 25 (Turkey) Sude Çifçi (LW)
- 28 (Turkey) Sümeyye Durdu (RW)
- 45 (Turkey) Kübra Nur Çınar
- 55 (Turkey) Arzu Nur Akbulut
- 87 (Turkey) Ceyhan Coşkunsu (GK)
- 99 (Turkey) Ela Yıldız
- (Turkey) Ayşenur Sormaz (LB)
