= Büşra Işıkhan =

Turkish handball player (born 1999)

Personal information
- Born: 1 January 1999 (age 27) Mardin, Turkey
- Height: 1.76 m (5 ft 9 in)

Sport
- Sport: Handball
- Position: Pivot
- Current club: Achenheim Truchtersheim Handball

Senior clubs
- Years: Team
- 2017–2019: Mardin BB SK
- 2020–2021: Konyaaltı Bld. SK
- 2021–2022: Tekirdağ Süleymanpaşa SK
- 2022: Anadolu Üniversitesi GSK
- 2022–2023: İzmir BB SK
- 2023–2024: Kastamonu Bld. GSK
- 2024–: Achenheim Truchtersheim Handball
National team
- Years: Team
- –: Turkey
Medal record
Representing Turkey
Women's Handball

Büşra Işıkhan (born 1 January 1999) is a Turkish handballer, who plays for Achenheim Truchtersheim Handball and the Turkey national team. The 1.76 m (5 ft 9 in)-tall sportswoman plays in the pivot position.

== Personal life ==
Büşra Işıkhan was born in Mardin, Turkey on 1 January 1999.

== Club career ==
Işıkhan is 1.76 m (5 ft 9 in) tall, and plays in the pivot position.

Işıkhan started her handball playing career in her hometown club Mardin Büyükşehir Belediye SK in 2017. She then transferred to Konyaaltı Bld. SK in Antalya in 2020, in 2021 to Tekirdağ Süleymanpaşa SK, in 2022 to Anadolu Üniversitesi GSK, in 2022 to İzmir BB SK, and in 2023 to Kastamonu Bld. GSK.

She played for İzmir BB GSK at the 2022–23 EHF European Cup, and for Kastamonu Bld. GSK at the 2023–24 Women's EHF European League.

In June 2024, she moved to France, and signed a deal with Achenheim Truchtersheim Handball (Piraths) in Strasbourg.

== International career ==
Işıkhan is a member of the national team. She was part of the team at the 2024 European Women's Handball Championship, and 2025 World Women's Handball Championship – European qualification.
