= Anadolu Üniversitesi GSK (women's handball) =

- Short name: Anadolu Üni. GSK
- Founded: 9 March 1984; 41 years ago
- Arena: Porsuk Sports Hall
- President: Tahsin Kılıç
- Head coach: Murat Kabadayı

Anadolu Üniversitesi GSK (Turkish: Anadolu Üniversitesi Gençlik Spor Kulübü), shortly Anadolu Üni. GSK, is the women's handball team of the Anadolu Üniversitesi GSK sponsored by Anadolu University in Eskişehir, Türkiye. It was founded on 9 March 1984. Club chairman is Tahsin Kılıç.

== Arena ==
The team play their home matches at the indoor arena Porsuk Sports Hall in Eskişehir.

== Accomplishments ==
Anadolu Üniversitesi GSK became champion in the 2000-01 Turkish Women's Handball Super League season. The team finished the 2016-17 Turkish Women's Handball First League season as champion. At the 2023 Intercollegiate Summer Games in Manis, Anadolu Üniversitesi GSK became champion in the women's handball. The girls team won the 2023-24 Turkish Girls' Handball Championship.

== Current squad ==
=== Technical staff ===
As of 2024-25 Turkish Women's Handball Super League season.

- Head coach: Murat Kabadayı
- Asst. coach: İsmail Sönmez
- Asst. coach: Şenay Kabadayı
- Physiotherapist: İrem Nur Erkart

=== Players ===
As of 2024-25 Turkish Women's Handball Super League season.

- 3 RB Şevval Özsöz
- 5 LP Nur Aleyna Köse
- 7 RW Selen Köklü
- 8 PV Rabia Er
- 11 RB Zeynep Nur Bilgeç
- 14 LB Buğu Sönmez
- 15 Gökçe Naz Şensöz
- 18 GK Tuğba Özbek
- 19 LW Kerimhan Kandemir
- 20 PV Halime Tuana Arslan
- 23 LP Alin Kabadayı
- 24 Pınar Sude Sarıbey
- 25 Kübra Çınar
- 26 PV Nisa Nur Bircan
- 33 GK Rana Doğan
- 66 RW Ümmühan Beray Akman
- 77 LW Aleyna Demirel

== Former notable players ==
- Turkey
  - Halime Tuana Arslan (2023–2025)
  - Büşra Işıkhan (2022)
  - Serpil İskenderoğlu (2003–2006)
  - Gonca Nahcıvanlı (1997–199, 2003–2005)
  - Yeliz Özel (2001–2002)
  - Burcu Pirinçci (2005–2008)
  - Ayşenur Sormaz (2022)
  - Sinem Vatan Güney (2021–2022)
