= Bursa Büyükşehir Bld. SK (women's handball) =

Turkish handball club

- Full name: Bursa Büyükşehir Belediyesi Spor Kulübü
- Short name: Bursa BBSK
- Founded: 17 October 1980; 45 years ago
- Arena: Üçevler Sports Facility
- Capacity: 380
- President: Muhammet Aydın
- Head coach: (Turkey) Mehmet Fatih Işık
- League: Turkish Women's Handball Super League
- Club colours

Bursa Büyükşehir Bld. SK (Turkish: Bursa Büyükşehir Belediyesi Spor Kulübü), shortly Bırsa BBSK, is the women's handball team of the same named club based in Bursa, Turkey. The team competes in the Turkish Super League. Club colours are white, navy and black. Club president is Muhammet Aydın.

== Location ==
Bursa Büyükşehir BLD. SK is locatedin the Fethiye Sports Complex at Fethiye Mah., Hüseyin Ormanlı Cad. 4 in Nilüfer, Bursa, Turkey.

== Arena ==
Bursa Bld. SK played their home matches at Mudanya Sports Hall in Mudanya, Bursa. Currently, they play in the Üçevler Sports Facility, a multi-sports hall in Nilüfer, Bursa with 380 seating capacity.

== History ==
Bursa Büyükşehir Bld. SK was founded on 17 October 1980.

The team completed the 2022–23 Turkish Women's Handball First League season as champion, and so was promoted to the Turkish Women's Handball Super League for the upcoming season. They finished the 2024–25 Super League season on the third place after play-offs. The team won the 2024–25 Turkish Women's Handball Cup defeating Ortahisar Bld. SK in the final by 30-25. Goalkeeper Sevilay İmamoğlu Öcal was awarded the "MVP of the Final" and the "Special Goalkeeper Prize". Bursa BB won for the first time the Turkish Women's Super Cup in 2025. They won the 2025–26 Turkish Women's Handball Cup, called the Women's THF 50th Anniversary Cup, second time in a row.

== Current squad ==
=== Technical staff ===
- Head coach: (Turkey) Fatih Işık

=== Players ===
Team members at the 2025–26 Turkish Women's Handball Super League:

- 1 (Turkey) Sevilay İmamoğlu Öcal (GK)
- 5 (Turkey) Beyzanur Türkyılmaz (LW)
- 7 (Turkey) Yeliz Özel (CB)
- 8 (Turkey) Cansu Akalın (LP)
- 10 (Turkey) Yağmur Aktay (RW)
- 22 (Turkey) Yaren Berfe Eren (GK)
- 30 (Russia) Alena Ikhneva (LB)
- 47 (Turkey) Büşra Işıkhan (LP)
- 48 (Turkey) Sibel Gündoğdu (LP)
- 53 (Turkey) Ecem Birben Antalyalı (LW)
- 61 (Turkey) Edanur Çetin (CB)
- 67 (Turkey) Zeynep Nur Kendirci (RW)
- 81 (Greece) Agni Zygoura (CB)
- 87 (Turkey) Emine Gökdemir (RW)
- 91 (Turkey) Fatma Ay Babür (GK)
- 97 (Angola) Joana Fortuna da Costa (RB)

== Former notable players ==
Turkey

- Ceyhan Coşkunsu (GK)
- Sude Çifçi (LW)
- Ceren Dem.rçelen (LP)
- Ayşenur Sormaz (LB)
- Betül Yılmaz (LB)

== International competitions ==
=== EHF European Cup ===
Season	Round	Opponent	1st leg	2nd leg	Aggregate
2024–25	Round 2	(Montenegro) ZRK Tivat	34–25	38–18	72–43
2024–25	Round 3	(Spain) Conservas Orbe Zendal BM Porriño	'26–34	26–24	52–58
2025–26	Round 3	(Greece) AEK Athens HC	37–29	30–29	67–58
2025–26	Last 16	(Spain) Replasa Beti-Onak	25–24	32–28	57–52
2025–26	Quarterfinals	(Greece) A.C. PAOK	36–30	29–34	65–64
2025–26	Semifinals	(Slovakia) IUVENTA Michalovce	34–29	–	34–29

== Kit history ==
2024–25 home	2024–25 away

== Honours ==
Turkish Women's Handball First League
Champions (1): 2022–23.

Turkish Women's Handball Super League
Third places (1): 2024–25.

Turkish Women's Handball Cup
Winners (2): 2024–25, 2025–26.

Turkish Women's Handball Super Cup
Winners (1): 2025.
