= Mahmoud Radwan =

Egyptian handball player

Personal information
- Nationality: Egyptian
- Born: 19 October 1989 (age 37)
- Height: 1.86 m (6 ft 1 in)

Sport
- Sport: Handball
- Position: Right wing
- Current club: Al Ahly
National team
Years	Team	Apps	(Gls)
–	Egypt	111	(444)
Medal record
Mediterranean Games
Gold medal – first place	2013 Mersin	Team

Mahmoud Radwan (born 19 October 1989) is an Egyptian handball player for Al Ahly and the Egyptian national team.
