= Turkish Women's Handball Cup =

- Country: Turkey
- Confederation: EHF
- Most recent champion: Bursa Büyükşehir Bld. (1st title)
- Broadcaster: TRT Spor

The Turkish Women's Handball Cup (Turkish: THF Kadınlar Türkiye Kupası or HDI Sigorta Kadınlar Hentbol Kupa) for sponsorship reasons, is a second-level women's handball cup competition organized by the Turkişsh Handball Federation (THF) in Turkey.

The cup is played between the teams of the Women's Super League and eight teams of the Women's First League.

== Winners ==
| Season | Winners | Runners-up | Ref |
|---|---|---|---|
| 2009–10 | Üsküdar Bld. | Muratpaşa Bld. | |
| 2010–11 | İzmir Büyükşehir Bld. | Maliye Milli Piyango | |
| 2011–12 | Muratpaşa Bld. | Maliye Milli Piyango | |
| 2012–13 | Üsküdar Bld. | Çankaya Bld. Anka | |
| 2013–14 | Muratpaşa Bld. | Yenimahalle Bld. | |
| 2014–15 | Yenimahalle Bld. | Muratpaşa Bld. | |
| 2015–16 | Ardeşen | Yenimahalle Bld. | |
| 2016–17 | Yenimahalle Bld. | Muratpaşa Bld. | |
| 2017–18 | Polatlı Bld. | Kastamonu Bld. | |
| 2018–19 | Muratpaşa Bld. | Kastamonu Bld. | |
| 2019–20 | Not held due to COVID-19 pandemic | | |
| 2020–21 | Kastamonu Bld. | İzmir Büyükşehir Bld. | |
| 2021–22 | Kastamonu Bld. | Konyaaltı Bld. | |
| 2022–23 | Yalıkavak | Kastamonu Bld. | |
| 2023–24 | Konyaaltı Bld. | Yalıkavak | |
| 2024–25 | Bursa Büyükşehir Bld. | Ortahisar Bld. | |
| 2025–26 | Bursa Büyükşehir Bld. | Üsküdar Bld. SK | |

== Titles by club ==
| Club | City | Winns | Runners-up |
|---|---|---|---|
| Muratpaşa Bld. | Antalya | 3 | 3 |
| Kastamonu Bld. | Kastamonu | 2 | 3 |
| Yenimahalle Bld. | Ankara | 2 | 2 |
| Üsküdar Bld. | Istanbul | 2 | 0 |
| Bursa Büyükşehir Bld. | Bursa | 2 | 0 |
| Konyaaltı Bld. | Antalya | 1 | 1 |
| Yalıkavak | Muğla | 1 | 1 |
| İzmir Büyükşehir Bld. | İzmir | 1 | 1 |
| Polatlı Bld. | Ankara | 1 | 0 |
| Ardeşen | Rize | 1 | 0 |

== See also ==
- Turkish Women's Handball Super Cup
