= Turkish Women's Handball Super Cup =

- Founded: 2010; 16 years ago
- No. of teams: 2
- Country: Turkey
- Confederation: EHF
- Most recent champion: Yalıkavak (2nd title)
- Most titles: Kastamonu Bld. (4 times)
- Broadcaster: TRT Spor
- Level on pyramid: Top
- 2025

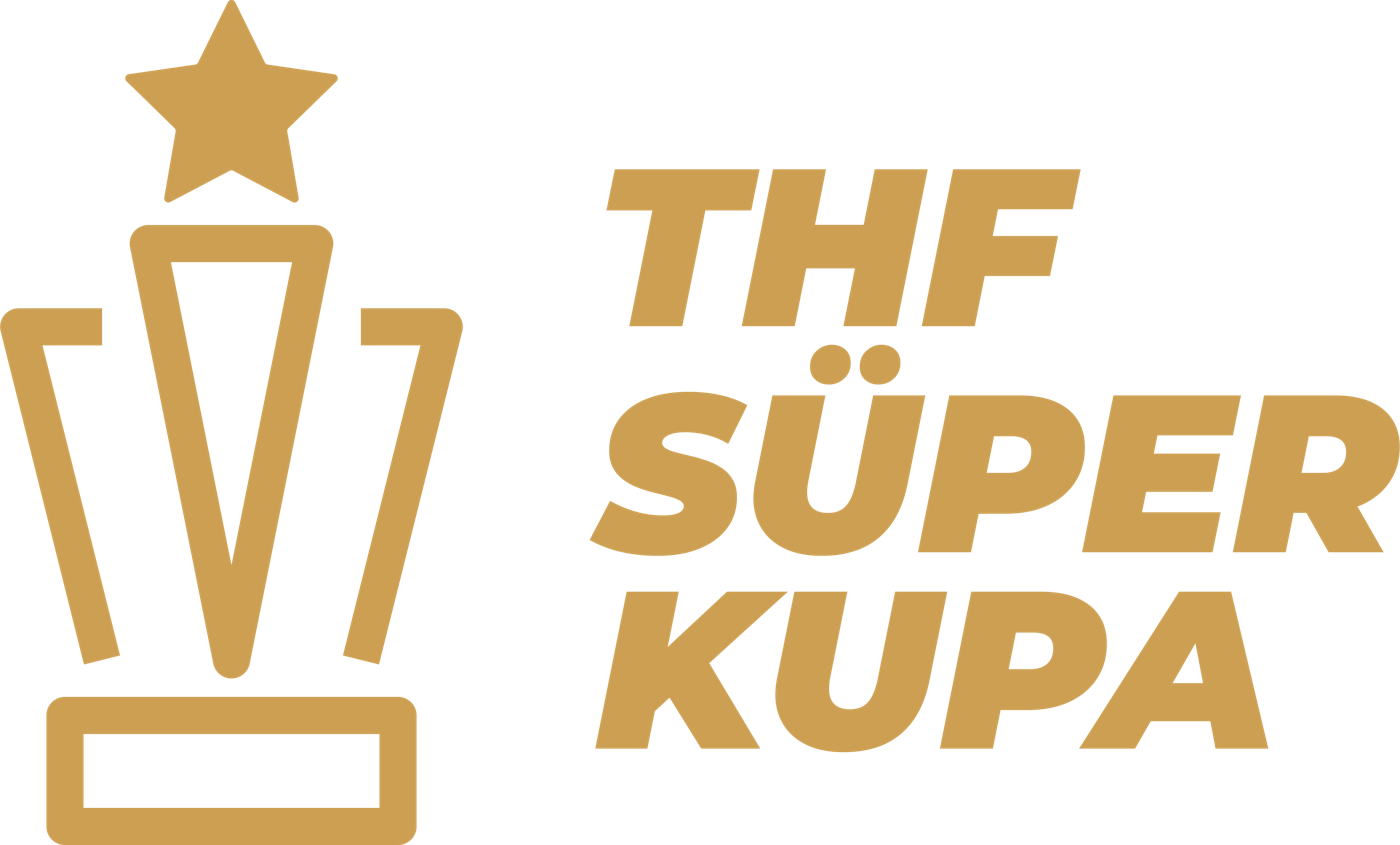

The Turkish Women's Handball Super Cup (Turkish: THF Kadınlar Süper Kupa or HDI Sigorta Kadınlar Süper Kupa) is an annual top-level women's handball competition organized by the Turkish Handball Federation (THF) in Turkey.

Until 2010, the competition was titled Youth and Sports Directorate General Women's Handball Cup (Gençlik ve Spor Genel Müdürlüğü Kadınlar Hentbol Kupa).

At the beginning of the Turkish Women's Handball Super League's new season in Fall, the cup is awarded to the winner of the match played between the previous year's Women's Super League champion and the Turkish Women's Handball Cup winner. If the Women's Super League champion is also the Turkish Women's Cup winner, the team that played the final of the Turkish Women's Cup is entitled to compete in the Women's Super Cup. If the Women's Super League champion of the previous season has withdrawn from the new league season or has folded, the team that finished the league in second place will be entitled to play in the Women's Super Cup. This right is passed down in a sequential manner. In cases other than these, the teams that will play the Women's Super Cup final will be determined by THF.

== Winners ==
Year	Winners	Runners-up	Ref
2010	Maliye Milli Piyango	Üsküdar Bld.	
2011	Üsküdar Bld.	İzmir Büyükşehir Bld.	
2012	Muratpaşa Bld.	İzmir Büyükşehir Bld.	
2013	Muratpaşa Bld.	Üsküdar Bld.	
2014	Yenimahalle Bld.	Muratpaşa Bld.	
2015	Yenimahalle Bld.	Muratpaşa Bld.	
2016	Ardeşen	Yenimahalle Bld.	
2017	Kastamonu Bld.	Yenimahalle Bld.	
2018	Muratpaşa Bld.	Polatlı Bld.	
2019	Kastamonu Bld.	Muratpaşa Bld.	
2020	Not held due to COVID-19 pandemic		
2021	Kastamonu Bld.	İzmir Büyükşehir Bld.	
2022	Kastamonu Bld.	Konyaaltı Bld.	
2023	Yalıkavak	Kastamonu Bld.	
2024	Yalıkavak	Yenimahalle Bld.	
2025	Bursa Büyükşehir Bld.	Yalıkavak	

== Titles by club ==
Club	City	Wins	Runners-up
Kastamonu Bld.	Kastamonu	4	1
Muratpaşa Bld.	Antalya	3	3
Yenimahalle Bld.	Ankara	2	3
Yalıkavak	Muğla	2	1
Üsküdar Bld.	Istanbul	1	2
Maliye Milli Piyango	Ankara	1	0
Ardeşen	Rize	1	0
Bursa Büyükşehir Bld.	Bursa	1	0

== See also ==
- Turkish Women's Handball Cup
- Turkish Women's Handball Super League
