= İzmir Büyükşehir Belediyesi GSK (women's handball) =

Turkish handball club

- Full name: İzmir Büyükşehir Belediyesi Gençlik ve Spor Kulübü
- Arena: Celal Atik Spor Salonu-Izmir
- Capacity: 1,700
- President: Ersan Odaman
- Head coach: Gonca Nahcıvanlı
- League: Turkish Super League
- 2021–22: 3rd
- Club colours
Home	Away

İzmir Büyükşehir Belediyesi GSK (Turkish: İzmir Büyükşehir Belediyesi Gençlik ve Spor Kulübü) is the women's handball team of the eponymous club sponsored by the Metropolitan Municipality of İzmir in Turkey. The team is currently competing in the Turkish Super League and the Women's EHF European Cup in the 2022–23 season. Their colors are blue and white.

== Honours ==
Turkish Handball Super League:

- Runner-up (1): 2010–11
- Third place (2): 2007–08, 2021–22

== Team ==
=== Current squad ===
Squad for the 2023–24 season.

Goalkeepers

- 29 (Turkey) Zeynep Onur
- 35 (Turkey) Halime İslamoğlu

Wings
LW

- 03 (Belarus) Nataliya Kotsina
- 05 (Turkey) Sena Senturk
- 99 (Turkey) Elif Sıla Aydın

RW

- 18 (Turkey) Esin Sağdıç
- 77 (Turkey) Esra Sögüt

Pivots

- 14 (Turkey) Nehirnaz Poyraz
- 17 (Turkey) Merve Ceylan
- 29 (Turkey) Sude Güngör

Backs

- 07 (Turkey) Sude Naz Dag
- 08 (Turkey) Zeynep Dilay
- 09 (Turkey) Berfin Zengin
- 22 (Turkey) Irem Celebi
- 23 (Turkey) Ozge Yakar
- 28 (Turkey) Tugba Diker
- 30 (Russia) Anastasiia Savas

== Notable former players ==
- Sevilay İmamoğlu Öcal (born 1984)
- Serpil İskenderoğlu (born 1987)
- Aslı İskit (born 1993)
- Esin Sağdıç (born 1988)
- Duygu Sakallı (born 1991)
- Yasemin Şahin (born 1988)
- Seda Yörükler (born 1984)
