= Turkish Women's Handball First League =

Handball league

Turkish Women's Handball First League THF Kadınlar Hentbol 1. Ligi
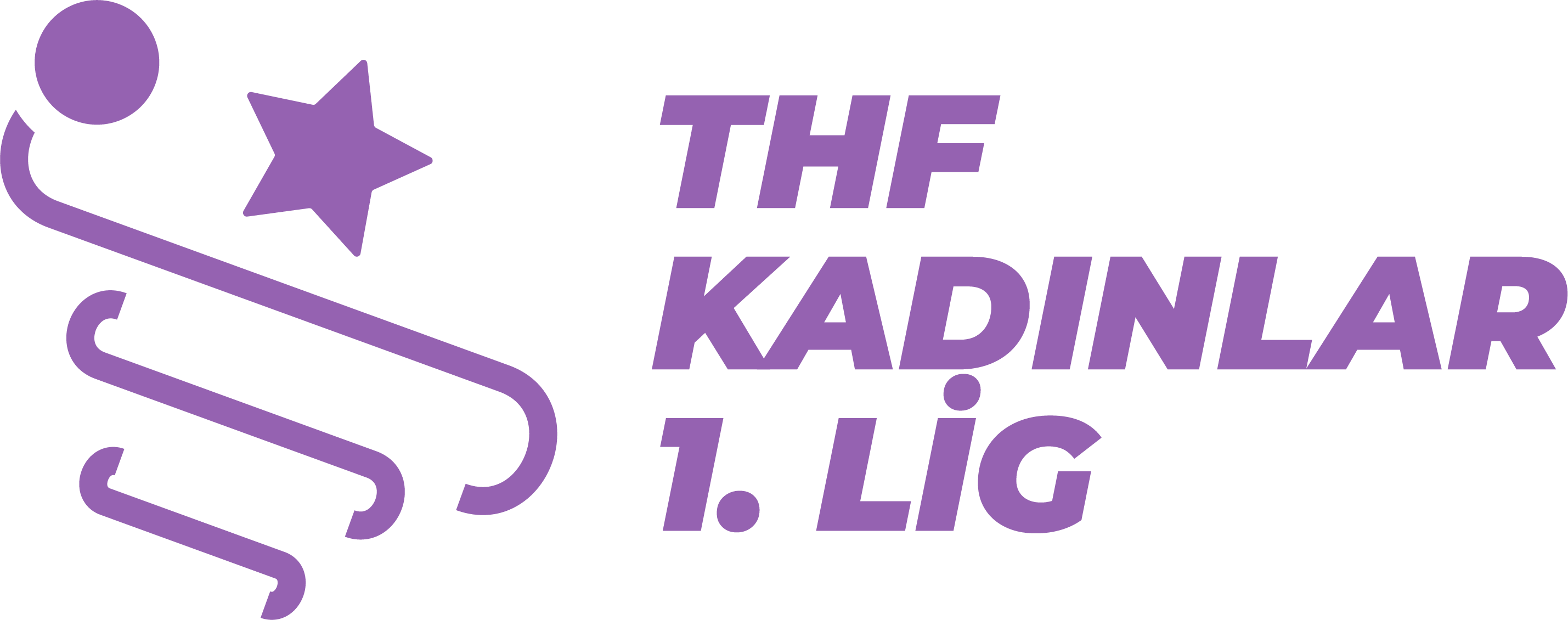
- Founded: 1978–79
- No. of teams: 15 (2024–25)
- Country: Turke
- Confederation: EHF
- Most recent champion: Polatlı Bld. (2024–25)
- Promotion to: Super League
- Relegation to: Second League
- Website: www.thf.gov.tr

The Turkish Women's Handball First League (Turkish: THF Kadınlar 1. Ligi) is the second-tier league for Turkish women's handball clubs.

Established in the 1978–79 season as the top-level handball league, it was renamed later to Super League. 15 teams compete in two groups (2024-25 season). At the end of the season play-offs, the league champion and the runner-up are promoted to the Women's Super League, the season's last placed team of each group is relegated to the Women's Second League. Semi-finalist teams participate at the Turkish Women's Championship. .

== Clubs ==
As of 2024–25 season:

Club	Place	Club	Place
Group A		Group B	
Odunpazarı	Rskişehir	Aksaray Bld.	Aksaray
Polatlı Bld.	Ankara	Atakum Bld.	Samsun
Tekirdağ CTE	Tekirdağ	Hammerjack Şahinbey Nurdağı	Gaziantep
Kepez Bld.	Antalya	Sivas Bld.	Sivas
Avcılar 1903	Istanbul	Kıta Logistics Yozgat ASH	Yozgat
Cent Koleji	Istanbul	Artvin 7 Mart	Artvin
Kastamonu Dinamik	Kastamonu	Karaman Minik Atılım	Karaman
İzmir Gençlik Hizmetleri	İzmir		

== Champions ==
(incomplete)

Season	Gold	Silver	Bronze
2022–23	Bursa Büyükşehir Bld.	Aksaray Bld.	
2023–24	Ortahisar Bld.	Kırşehir Bld.	Polatlı Bld.
2024–25	Polatlı Bld.	Odunpazarı	Tekirdağ CTE
