= Handball at the 2025 Islamic Solidarity Games =

- Venue: Green Hall
- Date: 13–21 November 2025
- Competitors: 256 from 13 nations

Handball at the 2025 Islamic Solidarity Games was held at the Green Hall in the Saudi Arabian Olympic Committee Complex, Riyadh, from 13 to 21 November 2025. In this event, a total of eight teams are set to participate in both the men's and women's competitions.

== Schedule ==
P	Preliminary round	½	Semifinals	B	Bronze medal game	G	Gold medal game

Event↓/Date →	13th Thu	14th Fri	15th Sat	16th Sun	17th Mon	18th Tue	19th Wed	20th Thu	21st Fri
Men		P		P		P	½	B	G
Women	P		P		P		½	B	G

== Draw ==
The draw for the competition was done on 26 October 2025.

=== Men ===
Group A

- Qatar
- Iran
- Maldives
- United Arab Emirates

Group B

- Bahrain
- Kuwait
- Iraq
- Saudi Arabia (Host)

=== Women ===
Group A

- Iran
- Turkey
- Guinea
- Maldives

Group B

- Kazakhstan
- Uzbekistan
- ~~Qatar~~
- Azerbaijan

== Medalists ==
Event	Gold	Silver	Bronze
Men	Bahrain	Saudi Arabia	Qatar
Women	Turkey	Kazakhstan	Iran

== Men's tournament ==
=== Preliminary round ===
All times are local (UTC+3).

==== Group A ====
Pos	Team	Pld	W	D	L	GF	GA	GD	Pts	Qualification
1	Qatar	3	3	0	0	124	53	+71	6	Semifinals
2	United Arab Emirates	3	2	0	1	105	76	+29	4	Semifinals
3	Iran	3	1	0	2	105	81	+24	2	
4	Maldives	3	0	0	3	30	154	−124	0	

Source: ISSA

14 November 2025; 10:00	Qatar	39–23	Iran	Olympic Complex – Green Hall, Riyadh
14 November 2025; 10:00	Madadi, Murad 6	(24–10)	Shojaei 6	Olympic Complex – Green Hall, Riyadh
14 November 2025; 10:00		Report		Olympic Complex – Green Hall, Riyadh

14 November 2025; 12:00	United Arab Emirates	53–10	Maldives	Olympic Complex – Green Hall, Riyadh
14 November 2025; 12:00	Al-Maazmi 14	(27–3)	Assad 4	Olympic Complex – Green Hall, Riyadh
14 November 2025; 12:00		Report		Olympic Complex – Green Hall, Riyadh

16 November 2025; 10:00	Qatar	41–24	United Arab Emirates	Olympic Complex – Green Hall, Riyadh
16 November 2025; 10:00	Memišević 7	(19–11)	Radwan 7	Olympic Complex – Green Hall, Riyadh
16 November 2025; 10:00		Report		Olympic Complex – Green Hall, Riyadh

16 November 2025; 12:00	Iran	57–14	Maldives	Olympic Complex – Green Hall, Riyadh
16 November 2025; 12:00	Heidari, Rahmani 12	(24–5)	Mohamed 3	Olympic Complex – Green Hall, Riyadh
16 November 2025; 12:00		Report		Olympic Complex – Green Hall, Riyadh

18 November 2025; 10:00	Qatar	44–6	Maldives	Olympic Complex – Green Hall, Riyadh
18 November 2025; 10:00	Madadi 8	(24–4)	Naeem 2	Olympic Complex – Green Hall, Riyadh
18 November 2025; 10:00		Report		Olympic Complex – Green Hall, Riyadh

18 November 2025; 12:00	Iran	25–28	United Arab Emirates	Olympic Complex – Green Hall, Riyadh
18 November 2025; 12:00	Sadeghzadeh 5	(13–10)	Radwan 8	Olympic Complex – Green Hall, Riyadh
18 November 2025; 12:00		Report		Olympic Complex – Green Hall, Riyadh

==== Group B ====
Pos	Team	Pld	W	D	L	GF	GA	GD	Pts	Qualification
1	Saudi Arabia (H)	3	3	0	0	81	62	+19	6	Semifinals
2	Bahrain	3	2	0	1	82	75	+7	4	Semifinals
3	Kuwait	3	1	0	2	80	72	+8	2	
4	Iraq	3	0	0	3	65	99	−34	0	

Source: ISSA
Rules for classification: 1) points; 2) head-to-head points; 3) head-to-head goal difference; 4) head-to-head number of goals scored; 5) goal difference.
(H) Hosts

14 November 2025; 14:00	Bahrain	28–27	Kuwait	Olympic Complex – Green Hall, Riyadh
14 November 2025; 14:00	Merza 7	(16–14)	Al-Adwani 7	Olympic Complex – Green Hall, Riyadh
14 November 2025; 14:00		Report		Olympic Complex – Green Hall, Riyadh

14 November 2025; 16:00	Saudi Arabia	33–21	Iraq	Olympic Complex – Green Hall, Riyadh
14 November 2025; 16:00	Mo. Al-Salem, Al-Turaiki 7	(17–11)	Al-Soued 6	Olympic Complex – Green Hall, Riyadh
14 November 2025; 16:00		Report		Olympic Complex – Green Hall, Riyadh

16 November 2025; 14:00	Kuwait	33–23	Iraq	Olympic Complex – Green Hall, Riyadh
16 November 2025; 14:00	Al-Adwani 11	(17–11)	Naser 6	Olympic Complex – Green Hall, Riyadh
16 November 2025; 14:00		Report		Olympic Complex – Green Hall, Riyadh

16 November 2025; 16:00	Bahrain	21–27	Saudi Arabia	Olympic Complex – Green Hall, Riyadh
16 November 2025; 16:00	Al-Showaikh 8	(9–17)	Mo. Al-Salem 7	Olympic Complex – Green Hall, Riyadh
16 November 2025; 16:00		Report		Olympic Complex – Green Hall, Riyadh

18 November 2025; 14:00	Bahrain	33–21	Iraq	Olympic Complex – Green Hall, Riyadh
18 November 2025; 14:00	Kadhem, Al-Showaikh 7	(17–12)	Haddawee, Naser 5	Olympic Complex – Green Hall, Riyadh
18 November 2025; 14:00		Report		Olympic Complex – Green Hall, Riyadh

18 November 2025; 16:00	Kuwait	20–21	Saudi Arabia	Olympic Complex – Green Hall, Riyadh
18 November 2025; 16:00	Dashti 5	(10–9)	three players 4	Olympic Complex – Green Hall, Riyadh
18 November 2025; 16:00		Report		Olympic Complex – Green Hall, Riyadh

=== Final round ===
==== Bracket ====
Semifinals
19 November
Qatar	30
Bahrain	31
19 November
Saudi Arabia	29
United Arab Emirates	15

Gold medal game
21 November
Bahrain	33
Saudi Arabia	31
Bronze medal game
20 November
Qatar	36
United Arab Emirates	28

==== Semifinals ====
19 November 2025; 15:30	Qatar	30–31	Bahrain	Olympic Complex – Green Hall, Riyadh
19 November 2025; 15:30	Guehis, Madadi 8	(14–13)	Al-Showaikh 9	Olympic Complex – Green Hall, Riyadh
19 November 2025; 15:30		Report		Olympic Complex – Green Hall, Riyadh

19 November 2025; 18:15	Saudi Arabia	29–15	United Arab Emirates	Olympic Complex – Green Hall, Riyadh
19 November 2025; 18:15	Furaij 6	(10–8)	Radwan 7	Olympic Complex – Green Hall, Riyadh
19 November 2025; 18:15		Report		Olympic Complex – Green Hall, Riyadh

==== Bronze medal game ====
20 November 2025; 14:15	Qatar	36–28	United Arab Emirates	Olympic Complex – Green Hall, Riyadh
20 November 2025; 14:15	Madadi 14	(15–14)	Radwan 10	Olympic Complex – Green Hall, Riyadh

==== Gold medal game ====
21 November 2025; 16:00	Bahrain	34–31	Saudi Arabia	Olympic Complex – Green Hall, Riyadh
21 November 2025; 16:00	Mohamed 9	(17–15)	Mo. Al-Salem 9	Olympic Complex – Green Hall, Riyadh
21 November 2025; 16:00		Report		Olympic Complex – Green Hall, Riyadh

== Women's tournament ==
=== Preliminary round ===
==== Group A ====
Pos	Team	Pld	W	D	L	GF	GA	GD	Pts	Qualification
1	Turkey	3	3	0	0	135	65	+70	6	Semifinals
2	Iran	3	2	0	1	100	70	+30	4	Semifinals
3	Guinea	3	1	0	2	97	75	+22	2	
4	Maldives	3	0	0	3	42	164	−122	0	

Source: ISSA
Rules for classification: 1) points; 2) head-to-head points; 3) head-to-head goal difference; 4) head-to-head number of goals scored; 5) goal difference.

13 November 2025; 10:00	Iran	28–36	Turkey	Olympic Complex – Green Hall, Riyadh
13 November 2025; 10:00	Koudzari 10	(12–15)	Tügel 10	Olympic Complex – Green Hall, Riyadh
13 November 2025; 10:00	5× (suspension)	Report	3× (suspension)	Olympic Complex – Green Hall, Riyadh

13 November 2025; 12:00	Guinea	52–16	Maldives	Olympic Complex – Green Hall, Riyadh
13 November 2025; 12:00	K. Bangoura 12	(30–5)	Arusha 3	Olympic Complex – Green Hall, Riyadh
13 November 2025; 12:00	3× (suspension)	Report	2× (suspension)	Olympic Complex – Green Hall, Riyadh

15 November 2025; 10:00	Iran	23–21	Guinea	Olympic Complex – Green Hall, Riyadh
15 November 2025; 10:00	Norouzi 5	(15–11)	Oulare 7	Olympic Complex – Green Hall, Riyadh
15 November 2025; 10:00		Report		Olympic Complex – Green Hall, Riyadh

15 November 2025; 12:00	Turkey	63–13	Maldives	Olympic Complex – Green Hall, Riyadh
15 November 2025; 12:00	Çifci 9	(29–6)	Arusha, Junaa 3	Olympic Complex – Green Hall, Riyadh
15 November 2025; 12:00	1× (suspension)	Report	1× (suspension)	Olympic Complex – Green Hall, Riyadh

17 November 2025; 10:00	Iran	49–13	Maldives	Olympic Complex – Green Hall, Riyadh
17 November 2025; 10:00	three players 6	(26–6)	Arusha, Junaa 4	Olympic Complex – Green Hall, Riyadh
17 November 2025; 10:00		Report		Olympic Complex – Green Hall, Riyadh

17 November 2025; 12:00	Turkey	36–24	Guinea	Olympic Complex – Green Hall, Riyadh
17 November 2025; 12:00	three players 5	(17–11)	Oulare 6	Olympic Complex – Green Hall, Riyadh
17 November 2025; 12:00		Report		Olympic Complex – Green Hall, Riyadh

==== Group B ====
Pos	Team	Pld	W	D	L	GF	GA	GD	Pts	Qualification
1	Kazakhstan	2	2	0	0	70	59	+11	4	Semifinals
2	Uzbekistan	2	1	0	1	56	62	−6	2	Semifinals
3	Azerbaijan	2	0	0	2	57	62	−5	0	

Source: ISSA
Rules for classification: 1) points; 2) head-to-head points; 3) head-to-head goal difference; 4) head-to-head number of goals scored; 5) goal difference.

13 November 2025; 14:00	Kazakhstan	36–28	Uzbekistan	Olympic Complex – Green Hall, Riyadh
13 November 2025; 14:00	Khassakhanova, Kuandykova 9	(16–14)	Obidjonova 6	Olympic Complex – Green Hall, Riyadh
13 November 2025; 14:00	1× (yellow card) 5× (suspension)	Report	4× (suspension)	Olympic Complex – Green Hall, Riyadh

15 November 2025; 14:00	Uzbekistan	28–26	Azerbaijan	Olympic Complex – Green Hall, Riyadh
15 November 2025; 14:00	Saparbaeva 9	(16–14)	Shukurova 7	Olympic Complex – Green Hall, Riyadh
15 November 2025; 14:00	4× (suspension)	Report	8× (suspension)	Olympic Complex – Green Hall, Riyadh

17 November 2025; 14:00	Kazakhstan	34–31	Azerbaijan	Olympic Complex – Green Hall, Riyadh
17 November 2025; 14:00	Khassakhanova 12	(16–14)	Bayramova, Hasanova 6	Olympic Complex – Green Hall, Riyadh
17 November 2025; 14:00		Report		Olympic Complex – Green Hall, Riyadh

=== Final round ===
==== Bracket ====
Semifinals
19 November
Turkey	39
Uzbekistan	22
19 November
Kazakhstan	29
Iran	26

Gold medal game
21 November
Turkey	34
Kazakhstan	31
Bronze medal game
20 November
Uzbekistan	25
Iran	29

==== Semifinals ====
19 November 2025; 10:00	Turkey	39–22	Uzbekistan	Olympic Complex – Green Hall, Riyadh
19 November 2025; 10:00	Tügel 8	(18–11)	Obidjonova 5	Olympic Complex – Green Hall, Riyadh
19 November 2025; 10:00		Report		Olympic Complex – Green Hall, Riyadh

19 November 2025; 12:45	Kazakhstan	29–26	Iran	Olympic Complex – Green Hall, Riyadh
19 November 2025; 12:45	Khassakhanova, Kuandykova 6	(14–13)	Koudzari 7	Olympic Complex – Green Hall, Riyadh
19 November 2025; 12:45		Report		Olympic Complex – Green Hall, Riyadh

==== Bronze medal game ====
20 November 2025; 12:00	Uzbekistan	25–29	Iran	Olympic Complex – Green Hall, Riyadh
20 November 2025; 12:00	Safarova 6	(11–15)	Merikh 11	Olympic Complex – Green Hall, Riyadh
20 November 2025; 12:00		Report		Olympic Complex – Green Hall, Riyadh

==== Gold medal game ====
21 November 2025; 13:30	Turkey	34–31	Kazakhstan	Olympic Complex – Green Hall, Riyadh
21 November 2025; 13:30	Bedel, Tügel 6	(14–12)	Seitkassym 9	Olympic Complex – Green Hall, Riyadh
21 November 2025; 13:30		Report		Olympic Complex – Green Hall, Riyadh
