= Turkish Women's Handball Super League =

Turkish Women's Handball Super League Türkiye Kadınlar Hentbol Süper Ligi
- Current season, competition or edition: 2026–27 Turkish Women's Handball Super League
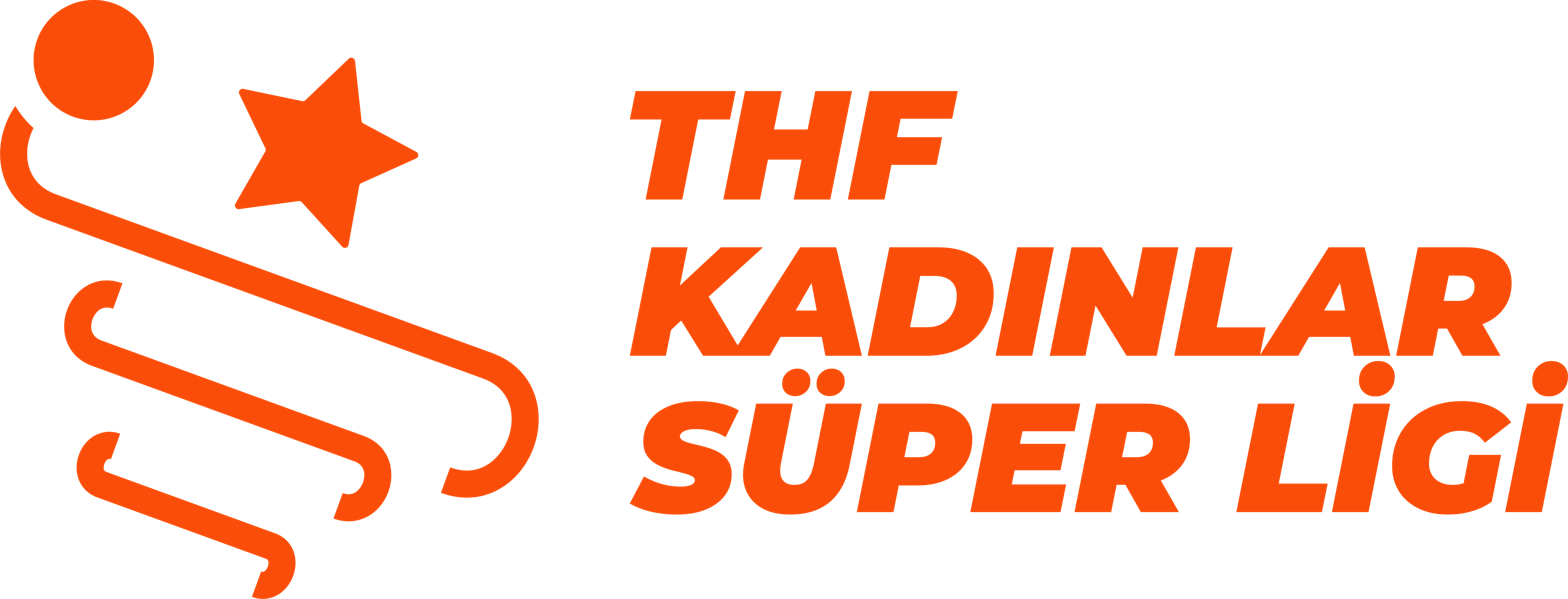
- Sport: Handball
- Founded: 1978–79
- Organizing body: Turkey Handball Federation
- No. of teams: 8 (2026–27)
- Country: Turkey
- Confederation: EHF
- Most recent champion: Bursa BB (2025–2026)
- Most titles: T.M.O. Ankara
- Relegation to: 1. Division
- International cups: Champions League; Cup Winners' Cup; EHF Cup
- Website: www.thf.gov.tr

The Turkish Women's Handball Super League (Turkish: Türkiye Kadınlar Hentbol Süper Ligi) is the top professional league for Turkish women's handball clubs. It is administered by the Turkey Handball Federation, and the winners are recognized as Turkish champions. Established in the 1978–79 season as the Turkish Women's First League, it was renamed later to Super League. The current title holder is Muratpaşa Bld. SK (2011–12).

== Competition format ==
The Turkish Women's Handball Super League shares the season style with the men's league. As of the 2022–23 season, it consists of 10 teams, each playing 18 regular season games. The eight teams with most points at the end of the regular season advance to the play-offs. Both first round of play-offs and semifinals are played in a best-of-three series, with the final being a best-of-five series.

The lowest placed one team of the regular season is directly relegated to the first division, and two teams from first division will be promoted.

== Clubs ==
=== 2022–23 season ===
Club	Location
Adasokağı	Adana
Anadolu Üniversitesi	Eskişehir
Görele Bld	Giresun
İzmir BB	İzmir
Kastamonu Bld.	Kastamonu
Konyaaltı Bld.	Antalya
Tekirdağ Süleymanpaşa	Tekirdağ
Üsküdar Bld.	Istanbul
Yalıkavak	Muğla
Yenimahalle Bld.	Ankara

=== 2024–25 season ===
Club	Location
Adasokağı	Adana
Anadolu Üniversitesi	Eskişehir
Bursa BB	Bursa
Görele Bld.	Giresun
İzmir BB	İzmir
Kırşehir Bld.	Kırşehir
Ortahisar Bld.	Trabzon
Üsküdar Bld.	Istanbul
Yalıkavak	Muğla
Yenimahalle Bld.	Ankara

=== 2025–26 season ===
Club	Location
Ankara Yurdum	Ankara
Bursa BB	Bursa
Göztepe	İzmir
Odunpazarı	Eskişehir
Ortahisar Bld.	Trabzon
Üsküdar Bld.	Istanbul
Yalıkavak	Muğla
Yenimahalle Bld.	Ankara

== Champions ==
(incomplete)
The complete list of champions since 1978:

Season	Gold	Silver	Bronze
1978–79			
1979–80	Genel-İş		
1980–81	Eti		
1981–82	MTA		
1982–83	Taç		
1983–84	İstanbul Bankası, Yenişehir		
1984–85	T.İ.Y. Erkut		
1985–86	Altınordu		
1986–87	Gazi Üniversitesi Tıp		
1987–88	Arçelik		
1988–89	Arçelik		
1989–90	Arçelik		
1990–91	T.M.O. Ankara		
1991–92	T.M.O. Ankara		
1992–93	T.M.O. Ankara		
1993–94	Kültür		
1994–95	T.M.O. Ankara		
1995–96	Eyüboğlu Koleji		
1996–97	Y.K.M.		
1997–98	Y.K.M.		
1998–99	T.M.O. Ankara		
1999–2000	T.M.O. Ankara		
2000–01	Anadolu Üniversitesi		
2001–02	T.M.O. Ankara		
2002–03	T.M.O. Ankara		
2003–04	Üsküdar Bld.		
2004–05	Havelsan		
2005–06	Çankaya Bld.		
2006–07	Maliye Milli Piyango		
2007–08	Maliye Milli Piyango	Üsküdar Bld.	İzmir B.B.
2008–09	Maliye Milli Piyango	Üsküdar Bld.	
2009–10	Maliye Milli Piyango	Üsküdar Bld.	
2010–11	Üsküdar Bld.	İzmir B.B.	Muratpaşa Bld.
2011–12	Muratpaşa Bld. SK	Üsküdar Bld.	Maliye Milli Piyango
2012–13	Muratpaşa Bld.	Üsküdar Bld.	
2013–14	Muratpaşa Bld.	Yenimahalle Bld.	Ardeşen GSK
2014–15	Yenimahalle Bld.	Muratpaşa Bld. SK	Kastamonu Bld.
2015–16	Ardeşen GSK	Zağnos	Muratpaşa Bld.
2016–17	Kastamonu Bld.	Yenimahalle Bld.	Ardeşen
2017–18	Muratpaşa Bld.	Kastamonu Bld.	Polatlı Bld.
2018–19	Kastamonu Bld.	Muratpaşa Bld.	Ardeşen
2019–20	Canceled due to COVID-19 pandemia		
2020–21	Kastamonu Bld.	Yalıkavak	Yenimahalle Bld.
2021–22	Kastamonu Bld.	Yalıkavak SK	İzmir BB
2022–23	Kastamonu Bld.	Konyaaltı Bld.	İzmir BB
2023–24	Yalıkavak	Yenimahalle Bld.	Konyaaltı Bld.
2024–25	Yalıkavak	Adasokağı	Bursa BB
2025–26	Bursa BB	Yalıkavak	Üsküdar Bld.

== Medal table ==
(incomplete)
As of: End of 2023–24 season

Team	Gold	Silver	Bronze
T.M.O. Ankara	8	0	0
Kastamonu Bld.	5	1	1
Muratpaşa Bld.	4	2	2
Maliye Milli Piyango	4	0	1
Arçelik	3	0	0
Üsküdar Bld.	2	5	1
Yalıkavak	2	2	
Y.K.M. SK	2	0	0
Yenimahalle Bld.	1	3	1
Ardeşen	1	0	3
Bursa BB	1	0	1
Altınordu	1	0	0
Anadolu Üniversitesi	1	0	0
Çankaya ld.	1	0	0
Eti	1	0	0
Eyüboğlu Koleji	1	0	0
Gazi University Tıp	1	0	0
Genel-İş	1	0	0
Havelsan	1	0	0
İstanbul Bankası, Yenişehir	1	0	0
Kültür	1	0	0
MTA	1	0	0
Taç	1	0	0
T.İ.Y. Erkut	1	0	0

== See also ==
- Turkish Men's Handball Super League
- Turkish Women's Handball Super Cup
