= 2010–11 Women's EHF Cup Winners' Cup =

European handball tournament

2010–11 EHF Women's Cup Winners' Cup
- Dates: 14 October 2010 – 15 May 2011

Final positions
- Champions: (Hungary) Ferencvárosi TC
- Runners-up: (Spain) CB Mar Alicante

Tournament statistics
- Top scorer(s): (Spain) Isabel Ortuño (87)

The 2010–11 EHF Women's Cup Winners' Cup was the 35th edition of the tournament that is organized by the European Handball Federation for the domestic cup winners on the continent. ŽRK Budućnost Podgorica were the title holders, however, as Montenegrin champions they entered the EHF Champions League this season. Ferencvárosi TC won the trophy for the second time in the club's history after beating CB Mar Alicante 57–52 on aggregate in the finals.

== Overview ==
=== Team allocation ===
Last 16
(Austria) Hypo Niederösterreich ^{CL}	(Denmark) Viborg HK ^{CL}	(France) Toulon St-Cyr Var Handball ^{CL}	(Russia) Zvezda Zvenigorod ^{CL}
Round 3
(Austria) SSV VEG Dornbirn Schoren	(Croatia) RK Lokomotiva Zagreb	(Denmark) Frederiksberg IF	(France) Metz Handball
(Germany) HSG Blomberg-Lippe	(Greece) OFN Ionias	(Hungary) Ferencvárosi TC	(Kosovo) KHF Kastrioti
(Montenegro) ŽRK Biseri	(Netherlands) Huyser E en O	(Norway) Tertnes HE	(Poland) KGHM Metraco Zagłębie Lubin
(Romania) CS Tomis Constanţa	(Russia) Rostov-Don	(Serbia) ŽRK Knjaz Miloš	(Slovakia) Banovsky HK Gabor
(Spain) CB Mar Alicante	(Turkey) Üsküdar Bld. SK	(Ukraine) HC Podatkova University	
Round 2
(Belarus) HPC Arkatron	(Belgium) HB Sint-Truiden	(Cyprus) SPE Strovolos	(Iceland) Fram Reykjavík
(Israel) Bney Herzeliya	(Italy) ASD HC Sassari	(Moldova) HC SSSno2 Chişinău	(Portugal) Madeira Andebol SAD
(Sweden) LUGI HF	(Switzerland) LC Brühl Handball		

^{CL} Relegated from the EHF Champions League

=== Round and draw dates ===
All draws held at the European Handball Federation headquarters in Vienna, Austria.

Round	Draw date	First leg	Second leg
Round 2	27 July 2010	14–23 October 2010	16–24 October 2010
Round 3	27 July 2010	13–20 November 2010	20–21 November 2010
Last 16	23 November 2010	4–11 February 2011	5–13 February 2011
Quarterfinals	15 February 2011	13–18 March 2011	19–20 March 2011
Semifinals	22 March 2011	9–10 April 2011	16–17 April 2011
Finals	19 April 2011	8 May 2011	15 May 2011

== Tournament ==
=== Round 2 ===
Team 1	Agg.	Team 2	1st leg	2nd leg
HPC Arkatron (Belarus)	92–34	(Moldova) HC SSSno2 Chişinău	51–11	41–23
Fram Reykjavík (Iceland)	57–50	(Switzerland) LC Brühl Handball	26–25	31–25
Madeira Andebol SAD (Portugal)	63–45	(Cyprus) SPE Strovolos	30–19	33–26
LUGI HF (Sweden)	70–34	(Belgium) HB Sint-Truiden	37–16	33–18
ASD HC Sassari (Italy)	72–55	(Israel) Bney Herzeliya	38–29	34–26

==== First leg ====
14 October 2010; 20:00	ASD HC Sassari (Italy)	38 – 29	(Israel) Bney Herzeliya	Tel-Aviv; Attendance: 400; Referees: Gökmen, Gök (Turkey)
14 October 2010; 20:00	Mladenović 9	(15–13)	Bertaut 8	Tel-Aviv; Attendance: 400; Referees: Gökmen, Gök (Turkey)
14 October 2010; 20:00	3× (yellow card)	Report	2× (yellow card) 3× (suspension)	Tel-Aviv; Attendance: 400; Referees: Gökmen, Gök (Turkey)

16 October 2010; 17:00	HPC Arkatron (Belarus)	51 – 11	(Moldova) HC SSSno2 Chişinău	Sport Palace RCOP, Minsk; Attendance: 300; Referees: Jaskins, Zabko (Latvia)
16 October 2010; 17:00	Shamanouskaya 15	(22–3)	Camis 6	Sport Palace RCOP, Minsk; Attendance: 300; Referees: Jaskins, Zabko (Latvia)
16 October 2010; 17:00	2× (yellow card) 3× (suspension)	Report	2× (yellow card) 1× (suspension)	Sport Palace RCOP, Minsk; Attendance: 300; Referees: Jaskins, Zabko (Latvia)

16 October 2010; 17:00	Madeira Andebol SAD (Portugal)	30 – 19	(Cyprus) SPE Strovolos	Pavilhão Gimnodesportivo do Funchal, Funchal; Attendance: 400; Referees: Bonouara, Sami (France)
16 October 2010; 17:00	Tavares 8	(16–9)	Bircina 9	Pavilhão Gimnodesportivo do Funchal, Funchal; Attendance: 400; Referees: Bonouara, Sami (France)
16 October 2010; 17:00	3× (yellow card) 4× (suspension)	Report	3× (yellow card) 7× (suspension)	Pavilhão Gimnodesportivo do Funchal, Funchal; Attendance: 400; Referees: Bonouara, Sami (France)

17 October 2010; 15:30	LUGI HF (Sweden)	37 – 16	(Belgium) HB Sint-Truiden	Idrottshallen, Lund; Attendance: 500; Referees: Cernavskis, Bogdanovs (Latvia)
17 October 2010; 15:30	Rosengren Jacobsen 9	(17–9)	Leenen 8	Idrottshallen, Lund; Attendance: 500; Referees: Cernavskis, Bogdanovs (Latvia)
17 October 2010; 15:30	3× (yellow card) 2× (suspension)	Report	3× (yellow card) 1× (suspension)	Idrottshallen, Lund; Attendance: 500; Referees: Cernavskis, Bogdanovs (Latvia)

23 October 2010; 17:30	Fram Reykjavík (Iceland)	26 – 25	(Switzerland) LC Brühl Handball	Sporthalle Kreuzbleiche, St. Gallen; Attendance: 700; Referees: Scevola, Alperan (Italy)
23 October 2010; 17:30	Knudsdottir 9	(14–10)	Mustafoska 7	Sporthalle Kreuzbleiche, St. Gallen; Attendance: 700; Referees: Scevola, Alperan (Italy)
23 October 2010; 17:30	3× (yellow card) 6× (suspension)	Report	3× (yellow card) 3× (suspension)	Sporthalle Kreuzbleiche, St. Gallen; Attendance: 700; Referees: Scevola, Alperan (Italy)

==== Second leg ====
16 October 2010; 19:00	Bney Herzeliya (Israel)	26 – 34	(Italy) ASD HC Sassari	Tel-Aviv; Attendance: 300; Referees: Gökmen, Gök (Turkey)
16 October 2010; 19:00	Bertaut 9	(17–15)	Bobrovnikova 8	Tel-Aviv; Attendance: 300; Referees: Gökmen, Gök (Turkey)
16 October 2010; 19:00	2× (yellow card) 4× (suspension)	Report	3× (yellow card) 3× (suspension)	Tel-Aviv; Attendance: 300; Referees: Gökmen, Gök (Turkey)

17 October 2010; 17:00	HC SSSno2 Chişinău (Moldova)	23 – 41	(Belarus) HPC Arkatron	Sport Palace RCOP, Minsk; Attendance: 200; Referees: Jaskins, Zabko (Latvia)
17 October 2010; 17:00	Donici 7	(13–16)	Kamenshykova 8	Sport Palace RCOP, Minsk; Attendance: 200; Referees: Jaskins, Zabko (Latvia)
17 October 2010; 17:00	2× (yellow card) 3× (suspension)	Report	3× (yellow card) 3× (suspension)	Sport Palace RCOP, Minsk; Attendance: 200; Referees: Jaskins, Zabko (Latvia)

23 October 2010; 18:00	SPE Strovolos (Cyprus)	26 – 33	(Portugal) Madeira Andebol SAD	Luceum Arch. Kyprianou, Strovolos; Attendance: 200; Referees: Markovska, Vutov (Bulgaria)
23 October 2010; 18:00	Bircina 9	(13–17)	Aguiar 8	Luceum Arch. Kyprianou, Strovolos; Attendance: 200; Referees: Markovska, Vutov (Bulgaria)
23 October 2010; 18:00	2× (yellow card) 3× (suspension)	Report	2× (yellow card) 1× (suspension)	Luceum Arch. Kyprianou, Strovolos; Attendance: 200; Referees: Markovska, Vutov (Bulgaria)

24 October 2010; 15:00	HB Sint-Truiden (Belgium)	18 – 33	(Sweden) LUGI HF	Sint-Truiden; Attendance: 200; Referees: Santos, Fonseca (Portugal)
24 October 2010; 15:00	Leenen 8	(9–13)	Radermacher, Ringdahl 7	Sint-Truiden; Attendance: 200; Referees: Santos, Fonseca (Portugal)
24 October 2010; 15:00	3× (yellow card) 2× (suspension)	Report	3× (yellow card) 7× (suspension)	Sint-Truiden; Attendance: 200; Referees: Santos, Fonseca (Portugal)

24 October 2010; 17:30	LC Brühl Handball (Switzerland)	25 – 31	(Iceland) Fram Reykjavík	Sporthalle Kreuzbleiche, St. Gallen; Attendance: 700; Referees: Scevola, Alperan (Italy)
24 October 2010; 17:30	Mustafoska 6	(12–16)	Sigurðardóttir	Sporthalle Kreuzbleiche, St. Gallen; Attendance: 700; Referees: Scevola, Alperan (Italy)
24 October 2010; 17:30	3× (yellow card) 2× (suspension)	Report	3× (yellow card) 3× (suspension)	Sporthalle Kreuzbleiche, St. Gallen; Attendance: 700; Referees: Scevola, Alperan (Italy)

=== Round 3 ===
Team 1	Agg.	Team 2	1st leg	2nd leg
ŽRK Knjaz Miloš (Serbia)	81–53	(Kosovo) KHF Kastrioti	47–34	34–29
Üsküdar Bld. SK (Turkey)	56–68	(Norway) Tertnes HE	32–34	24–34
Banovsky HK Gabor (Slovakia)	52–85	(Hungary) Ferencvárosi TC	26–32	26–53
RK Lokomotiva Zagreb (Croatia)	49–31	(Netherlands) Huyser E en O	20–15	29–16
LUGI HF (Sweden)	52–47	(Montenegro) ŽRK Biseri	28–30	24–17
Madeira Andebol SAD (Portugal)	45–51	(Romania) CS Tomis Constanţa	27–27	18–24
HPC Arkatron (Belarus)	55–72	(Germany) HSG Blomberg-Lippe	27–36	28–36
Rostov-Don (Russia)	67–57	(Italy) ASD HC Sassari	35–31	32–26
Fram Reykjavík (Iceland)	67–45	(Ukraine) HC Podatkova University	36–21	31–24
KGHM Metraco Zagłębie Lubin (Poland)	52–55	(Spain) CB Mar Alicante	30–28	22–27
SSV VEG Dornbirn Schoren (Austria)	33–84	(Denmark) Frederiksberg IF	20–37	13–47
OFN Ionias (Greece)	37–64	(France) Metz Handball	18–33	19–31

==== First leg ====
13 November 2010; 16:00	Madeira Andebol SAD (Portugal)	27 – 27	(Romania) CS Tomis Constanţa	Pavilhão Gimnodesportivo do Funchal, Funchal; Attendance: 500; Referees: van Dijk, Wijtenburg (Netherlands)
13 November 2010; 16:00	Aguiar 7	(14–13)	Barcan-Gheorge 6	Pavilhão Gimnodesportivo do Funchal, Funchal; Attendance: 500; Referees: van Dijk, Wijtenburg (Netherlands)
13 November 2010; 16:00	2× (yellow card) 5× (suspension)	Report	2× (yellow card) 4× (suspension)	Pavilhão Gimnodesportivo do Funchal, Funchal; Attendance: 500; Referees: van Dijk, Wijtenburg (Netherlands)

13 November 2010; 17:00	KGMH Metraco Zagłębie Lubin (Poland)	30 – 28	(Spain) CB Mar Alicante	Hala SP nr 14, Lubin; Attendance: 500; Referees: Pech, Vágvölgyi (Hungary)
13 November 2010; 17:00	Semeniuk-Olchawa 10	(13-13)	I. Ortuño 12	Hala SP nr 14, Lubin; Attendance: 500; Referees: Pech, Vágvölgyi (Hungary)
13 November 2010; 17:00	3× (yellow card) 6× (suspension)	Report	3× (yellow card) 4× (suspension)	Hala SP nr 14, Lubin; Attendance: 500; Referees: Pech, Vágvölgyi (Hungary)

13 November 2010; 18:00	Banovsky HK Gabor (Slovakia)	26 – 32	(Hungary) Ferencvárosi TC	Attendance: 500; Referees: Christildi, Papamattheou (Greece)
13 November 2010; 18:00	Tóthová 9	(12–20)	Szucsánszki 11	Attendance: 500; Referees: Christildi, Papamattheou (Greece)
13 November 2010; 18:00	3× (yellow card) 1× (suspension)	Report	3× (yellow card) 4× (suspension)	Attendance: 500; Referees: Christildi, Papamattheou (Greece)

13 November 2010; 19:00	SSV VEG Dornbirn Schoren (Austria)	20 – 37	(Denmark) Frederiksberg IF	Dornbirner Messehalle, Dornbirn; Attendance: 700; Referees: Lah, Sok (Slovenia)
13 November 2010; 19:00	Bundovic 6	(7–17)	Touray 11	Dornbirner Messehalle, Dornbirn; Attendance: 700; Referees: Lah, Sok (Slovenia)
13 November 2010; 19:00	3× (yellow card) 3× (suspension)	Report	3× (yellow card) 3× (suspension)	Dornbirner Messehalle, Dornbirn; Attendance: 700; Referees: Lah, Sok (Slovenia)

14 November 2010; 17:00	Üsküdar Bld. SK (Turkey)	32 – 34	(Norway) Tertnes HE	Haldun Alagaş Sports Hall, Istanbul; Attendance: 400; Referees: Konjicanin, Konjicanin (Bosnia and Herzegovina)
14 November 2010; 17:00	Yaman 9	(13–19)	Gossé 11	Haldun Alagaş Sports Hall, Istanbul; Attendance: 400; Referees: Konjicanin, Konjicanin (Bosnia and Herzegovina)
14 November 2010; 17:00	3× (yellow card) 10× (suspension)	Report	2× (yellow card) 6× (suspension)	Haldun Alagaş Sports Hall, Istanbul; Attendance: 400; Referees: Konjicanin, Konjicanin (Bosnia and Herzegovina)

14 November 2010; 18:00	ASD HC Sassari (Italy)	26 – 32	(Russia) Rostov-Don	Palasantoru, Sassari; Attendance: 1,000; Referees: Erdogan, Özdeniz (Turkey)
14 November 2010; 18:00	Chernova 8	(13–13)	Svitanko, Zhuykova 7	Palasantoru, Sassari; Attendance: 1,000; Referees: Erdogan, Özdeniz (Turkey)
14 November 2010; 18:00	3× (yellow card) 2× (suspension) 1× (red card)	Report	3× (yellow card) 2× (suspension)	Palasantoru, Sassari; Attendance: 1,000; Referees: Erdogan, Özdeniz (Turkey)

19 November 2010; 17:00	LUGI HF (Sweden)	28 – 30	(Montenegro) ŽRK Biseri	Sportski Centar Ada, Pljevlja; Attendance: 800; Referees: Dimkova, Lyubenova (Bulgaria)
19 November 2010; 17:00	Rosenberg Jacobsen 3	(15–15)	Nikolić, Stojanović 8	Sportski Centar Ada, Pljevlja; Attendance: 800; Referees: Dimkova, Lyubenova (Bulgaria)
19 November 2010; 17:00	3× (yellow card) 4× (suspension)	Report	3× (yellow card) 3× (suspension)	Sportski Centar Ada, Pljevlja; Attendance: 800; Referees: Dimkova, Lyubenova (Bulgaria)

19 November 2010; 18:30	RK Lokomotiva Zagreb (Croatia)	20 – 15	(Netherlands) Huyser E en O	Dom Sportova, Zagreb; Attendance: 200; Referees: Gökmen, Gök (Turkey)
19 November 2010; 18:30	Šerić 7	(11–9)	Stefánsdóttir 8	Dom Sportova, Zagreb; Attendance: 200; Referees: Gökmen, Gök (Turkey)
19 November 2010; 18:30	3× (yellow card) 2× (suspension)	Report	3× (yellow card) 2× (suspension)	Dom Sportova, Zagreb; Attendance: 200; Referees: Gökmen, Gök (Turkey)

19 November 2010; 20:30	OFN Ionias (Greece)	18 – 33	(France) Metz Handball	Gymnase Jean Pierre Adams, Thionville; Attendance: 1,100; Referees: Siewert Delle, Engberg (Sweden)
19 November 2010; 20:30	Papanikolaou 5	(8–16)	Kamto Njitam, Piejos 7	Gymnase Jean Pierre Adams, Thionville; Attendance: 1,100; Referees: Siewert Delle, Engberg (Sweden)
19 November 2010; 20:30	2× (yellow card) 3× (suspension)	Report	1× (yellow card) 2× (suspension)	Gymnase Jean Pierre Adams, Thionville; Attendance: 1,100; Referees: Siewert Delle, Engberg (Sweden)

20 November 2010; 14:00	ŽRK Knjaz Miloš (Serbia)	47 – 24	(Kosovo) KHF Kastrioti	SRC Kale, Skopje
20 November 2010; 14:00	Petrović 14	(21–15)	Beba 10	SRC Kale, Skopje
20 November 2010; 14:00	3× (yellow card) 3× (suspension)	Report	3× (yellow card) 4× (suspension)	SRC Kale, Skopje

20 November 2010; 17:00	HPC Arkatron (Belarus)	27 – 36	(Germany) HSG Blomberg-Lippe	Sport Palace RCOP, Minsk; Attendance: 500; Referees: Harabagiu, Stanescu (Romania)
20 November 2010; 17:00	Khlimankova 11	(14–17)	Lang 9	Sport Palace RCOP, Minsk; Attendance: 500; Referees: Harabagiu, Stanescu (Romania)
20 November 2010; 17:00	3× (yellow card) 2× (suspension)	Report	2× (yellow card) 4× (suspension)	Sport Palace RCOP, Minsk; Attendance: 500; Referees: Harabagiu, Stanescu (Romania)

20 November 2010; 19:00	Fram Reykjavík (Iceland)	36 – 21	(Ukraine) HC Podatkova University	Fram Sporthall, Reykjavík; Attendance: 300; Referees: Samuelsen, Hansen (Faroe Islands)
20 November 2010; 19:00	Three players 6	(22–8)	Burlachenko 8	Fram Sporthall, Reykjavík; Attendance: 300; Referees: Samuelsen, Hansen (Faroe Islands)
20 November 2010; 19:00	3× (yellow card)	Report	4× (yellow card) 2× (suspension)	Fram Sporthall, Reykjavík; Attendance: 300; Referees: Samuelsen, Hansen (Faroe Islands)

==== Second leg ====
20 November 2010; 13:30	Frederiksberg IF (Denmark)	47 – 13	(Austria) SSV VEG Dornbirn Schoren	Frederiksberghallen, Frederiksberg; Attendance: 200; Referees: Santos, Fonseca (Portugal)
20 November 2010; 13:30	Touray 15	(26–7)	Sólyom 5	Frederiksberghallen, Frederiksberg; Attendance: 200; Referees: Santos, Fonseca (Portugal)
20 November 2010; 13:30	2× (yellow card) 3× (suspension)	Report	2× (yellow card) 6× (suspension) 1× (red card)	Frederiksberghallen, Frederiksberg; Attendance: 200; Referees: Santos, Fonseca (Portugal)

20 November 2010; 17:00	Rostov-Don (Russia)	35 – 31	(Italy) ASD HC Sassari	Dvorets Sporta Don, Rostov-on-Don; Attendance: 2,000; Referees: Ilieva, Karbeska (Macedonia)
20 November 2010; 17:00	Shymkute 8	(14–15)	Bobrovnikova 9	Dvorets Sporta Don, Rostov-on-Don; Attendance: 2,000; Referees: Ilieva, Karbeska (Macedonia)
20 November 2010; 17:00	3× (yellow card) 5× (suspension)	Report	3× (yellow card) 2× (suspension)	Dvorets Sporta Don, Rostov-on-Don; Attendance: 2,000; Referees: Ilieva, Karbeska (Macedonia)

20 November 2010; 18:00	Tertnes HE (Norway)	34 – 24	(Turkey) Üsküdar Bld. SK	Haukelandshallen, Bergen; Attendance: 500; Referees: Mykolaitis, Sniurevicius (Lithuania)
20 November 2010; 18:00	Pedersen 8	(17–12)	Yilmaz 7	Haukelandshallen, Bergen; Attendance: 500; Referees: Mykolaitis, Sniurevicius (Lithuania)
20 November 2010; 18:00	2× (yellow card) 4× (suspension)	Report	2× (yellow card) 6× (suspension)	Haukelandshallen, Bergen; Attendance: 500; Referees: Mykolaitis, Sniurevicius (Lithuania)

20 November 2010; 19:00	Huyser E en O (Netherlands)	16 – 29	(Croatia) RK Lokomotiva Zagreb	Dom Sportova, Zagreb; Attendance: 200; Referees: Gökmen, Gök (Turkey)
20 November 2010; 19:00	Kooiper, Schop 3	(8–14)	Šerić 7	Dom Sportova, Zagreb; Attendance: 200; Referees: Gökmen, Gök (Turkey)
20 November 2010; 19:00	3× (yellow card) 4× (suspension)	Report	2× (yellow card) 5× (suspension)	Dom Sportova, Zagreb; Attendance: 200; Referees: Gökmen, Gök (Turkey)

21 November 2010; 11:00	CS Tomis Constanţa (Romania)	24 – 18	(Portugal) Madeira Andebol SAD	Sala Sporturilor, Constanţa; Attendance: 900; Referees: Katsikis, Michailidis (Greece)
21 November 2010; 11:00	Barcan-Gheorge 5	(14–8)	Sousa 4	Sala Sporturilor, Constanţa; Attendance: 900; Referees: Katsikis, Michailidis (Greece)
21 November 2010; 11:00	3× (yellow card) 6× (suspension) 1× (red card)	Report	1× (yellow card) 4× (suspension) 1× (red card)	Sala Sporturilor, Constanţa; Attendance: 900; Referees: Katsikis, Michailidis (Greece)

21 November 2010; 13:00	KHF Kastrioti (Kosovo)	29 – 34	(Serbia) ŽRK Knjaz Miloš	SRC Kale, Skopje
21 November 2010; 13:00	Xhemaili 8	(13–21)	Radočić 8	SRC Kale, Skopje
21 November 2010; 13:00	3× (yellow card) 3× (suspension)	Report	3× (yellow card) 2× (suspension)	SRC Kale, Skopje

21 November 2010; 13:00	CB Mar Alicante (Spain)	27 – 22	(Poland) KGMH Metraco Zagłębie Lubin	Pabellón Municipal Pitiu Rochel, Alicante; Attendance: 600; Referees: Bonouara, Sami (France)
21 November 2010; 13:00	I. Ortuño 12	(15-9)	Semeniuk-Olchawa 8	Pabellón Municipal Pitiu Rochel, Alicante; Attendance: 600; Referees: Bonouara, Sami (France)
21 November 2010; 13:00	3× (yellow card) 4× (suspension)	Report	3× (yellow card) 6× (suspension) 1× (red card)	Pabellón Municipal Pitiu Rochel, Alicante; Attendance: 600; Referees: Bonouara, Sami (France)

21 November 2010; 16:00	HSG Blomberg-Lippe (Germany)	36 – 28	(Belarus) HPC Arkatron	Sport Palace RCOP, Minsk; Attendance: 500; Referees: Harabagiu, Stanescu (Romania)
21 November 2010; 16:00	Richter 9	(16–16)	Tsybulka 8	Sport Palace RCOP, Minsk; Attendance: 500; Referees: Harabagiu, Stanescu (Romania)
21 November 2010; 16:00	3× (yellow card) 8× (suspension)	Report	2× (yellow card) 6× (suspension)	Sport Palace RCOP, Minsk; Attendance: 500; Referees: Harabagiu, Stanescu (Romania)

21 November 2010; 17:00	Ferencvárosi TC (Hungary)	53 – 26	(Slovakia) Banovsky HK Gabor	FTC Aréna, Budapest; Attendance: 500; Referees: Antić, Jakovljević (Serbia)
21 November 2010; 17:00	Tomori 10	(29–13)	Tóthová 10	FTC Aréna, Budapest; Attendance: 500; Referees: Antić, Jakovljević (Serbia)
21 November 2010; 17:00	3× (yellow card) 3× (suspension)	Report	3× (yellow card) 4× (suspension)	FTC Aréna, Budapest; Attendance: 500; Referees: Antić, Jakovljević (Serbia)

21 November 2010; 17:00	ŽRK Biseri (Montenegro)	17 – 24	(Sweden) LUGI HF	Sportski Centar Ada, Pljevlja; Attendance: 800; Referees: Dimkova, Lyubenova (Bulgaria)
21 November 2010; 17:00	Milič, Stojanović 5	(8–9)	Skogsberg 8	Sportski Centar Ada, Pljevlja; Attendance: 800; Referees: Dimkova, Lyubenova (Bulgaria)
21 November 2010; 17:00	2× (yellow card) 2× (suspension)	Report	2× (yellow card) 3× (suspension)	Sportski Centar Ada, Pljevlja; Attendance: 800; Referees: Dimkova, Lyubenova (Bulgaria)

21 November 2010; 17:00	HC Podatkova University (Ukraine)	24 – 31	(Iceland) Fram Reykjavík	Fram Sporthall, Reykjavík; Attendance: 300; Referees: Samuelsen, Hansen (Faroe Islands)
21 November 2010; 17:00	Burlachenko 6	(11–13)	Jóhannsdóttir 8	Fram Sporthall, Reykjavík; Attendance: 300; Referees: Samuelsen, Hansen (Faroe Islands)
21 November 2010; 17:00	2× (yellow card) 3× (suspension)	Report	3× (yellow card) 2× (suspension)	Fram Sporthall, Reykjavík; Attendance: 300; Referees: Samuelsen, Hansen (Faroe Islands)

21 November 2010; 17:00	Metz Handball (France)	31 – 19	(Greece) OFN Ionias	Les Arènes, Metz; Attendance: 2,300; Referees: Siewert Delle, Engberg (Sweden)
21 November 2010; 17:00		(15–8)		Les Arènes, Metz; Attendance: 2,300; Referees: Siewert Delle, Engberg (Sweden)
21 November 2010; 17:00		Report		Les Arènes, Metz; Attendance: 2,300; Referees: Siewert Delle, Engberg (Sweden)

=== Last 16 ===
Team 1	Agg.	Team 2	1st leg	2nd leg
LUGI HF (Sweden)	50–48	(Norway) Tertnes HE	27–18	23–30
HSG Blomberg-Lippe (Germany)	56–53	(Iceland) Fram Reykjavík	26–24	30–29
Metz Handball (France)	57–51	(Austria) Hypo Niederösterreich	27–22	30–29
RK Lokomotiva Zagreb (Croatia)	49–64	(Russia) Zvezda Zvenigorod	23–30	26–34
CS Tomis Constanţa (Romania)	53–68	(Russia) Rostov-Don	25–38	28–30
ŽRK Knjaz Miloš (Serbia)	49–79	(France) Toulon St-Cyr Var Handball	23–43	26–36
Viborg HK (Denmark)	66–66 (a)	(Hungary) Ferencvárosi TC	34–33	32–33
Frederiksberg IF (Denmark)	53–59	(Spain) CB Mar Alicante	27–24	26–35

==== First leg ====
4 February 2011; 18:00	CS Tomis Constanţa (Romania)	25 – 38	(Russia) Rostov-Don	Dvorets Sporta Don, Rostov-on-Don; Attendance: 2,000; Referees: Argyridis, Mouttas (Cyprus)
4 February 2011; 18:00	Barcan-Gheorghe 9	(10–22)	Yartseva 7	Dvorets Sporta Don, Rostov-on-Don; Attendance: 2,000; Referees: Argyridis, Mouttas (Cyprus)
4 February 2011; 18:00	3× (yellow card) 4× (suspension)	Report	3× (yellow card) 4× (suspension)	Dvorets Sporta Don, Rostov-on-Don; Attendance: 2,000; Referees: Argyridis, Mouttas (Cyprus)

4 February 2011; 19:00	LUGI HF (Sweden)	27 – 18	(Norway) Tertnes HE	Idrottshallen, Lund; Attendance: 800; Referees: Rutkovskis, Dzerve (Latvia)
4 February 2011; 19:00	Rosengren Jacobsen 8	(10–8)	Gossé, Haga Holgersen 4	Idrottshallen, Lund; Attendance: 800; Referees: Rutkovskis, Dzerve (Latvia)
4 February 2011; 19:00	2× (yellow card) 3× (suspension)	Report	1× (yellow card) 2× (suspension)	Idrottshallen, Lund; Attendance: 800; Referees: Rutkovskis, Dzerve (Latvia)

4 February 2011; 19:00	HSG Blomberg-Lippe (Germany)	26 – 24	(Iceland) Fram Reykjavík	Fram Sporthall, Reykjavík; Attendance: 300; Referees: van de Beek, Egberts (Netherlands)
4 February 2011; 19:00	Richter 9	(18–12)	Sigurðardóttir 9	Fram Sporthall, Reykjavík; Attendance: 300; Referees: van de Beek, Egberts (Netherlands)
4 February 2011; 19:00	2× (yellow card) 4× (suspension)	Report	3× (yellow card) 3× (suspension)	Fram Sporthall, Reykjavík; Attendance: 300; Referees: van de Beek, Egberts (Netherlands)

5 February 2011; 15:00	Viborg HK (Denmark)	34 – 33	(Hungary) Ferencvárosi TC	Viborg Stadionhal, Viborg; Attendance: 1,700; Referees: Sitsi, Heinla (Estonia)
5 February 2011; 15:00	Jurack 7	(19–18)	Zácsik 11	Viborg Stadionhal, Viborg; Attendance: 1,700; Referees: Sitsi, Heinla (Estonia)
5 February 2011; 15:00	3× (yellow card) 2× (suspension)	Report	3× (yellow card) 1× (suspension)	Viborg Stadionhal, Viborg; Attendance: 1,700; Referees: Sitsi, Heinla (Estonia)

5 February 2011; 15:00	Frederiksberg IF (Denmark)	27 – 24	(Spain) CB Mar Alicante	Frederiksberghallen, Frederiksberg; Attendance: 200; Referees: Liachovicius, Gecevicius (Lithuania)
5 February 2011; 15:00	Skovgaard, Touray 7	(16–10)	I. Ortuño 9	Frederiksberghallen, Frederiksberg; Attendance: 200; Referees: Liachovicius, Gecevicius (Lithuania)
5 February 2011; 15:00	3× (yellow card) 4× (suspension)	Report	3× (yellow card) 3× (suspension)	Frederiksberghallen, Frederiksberg; Attendance: 200; Referees: Liachovicius, Gecevicius (Lithuania)

5 February 2011; 17:00	RK Lokomotiva Zagreb (Croatia)	23 – 30	(Russia) Zvezda Zvenigorod	Zvezda, Zvenigorod; Attendance: 1,000; Referees: Covalciuc, Covalciuc (Moldova)
5 February 2011; 17:00	Šerić 6	(13–15)	Dmitrieva 10	Zvezda, Zvenigorod; Attendance: 1,000; Referees: Covalciuc, Covalciuc (Moldova)
5 February 2011; 17:00	3× (yellow card) 5× (suspension)	Report	2× (yellow card) 2× (suspension)	Zvezda, Zvenigorod; Attendance: 1,000; Referees: Covalciuc, Covalciuc (Moldova)

6 February 2011; 17:00	Metz Handball (France)	27 – 22	(Austria) Hypo Niederösterreich	Les Arènes, Metz; Attendance: 4,500; Referees: Marín, Garcia (Spain)
6 February 2011; 17:00	Piejos 6	(11–7)	do Nascimento 6	Les Arènes, Metz; Attendance: 4,500; Referees: Marín, Garcia (Spain)
6 February 2011; 17:00	3× (yellow card) 3× (suspension)	Report	3× (yellow card) 4× (suspension)	Les Arènes, Metz; Attendance: 4,500; Referees: Marín, Garcia (Spain)

11 February 2011; 20:30	ŽRK Knjaz Miloš (Serbia)	23 – 43	(France) Toulon St-Cyr Var Handball	Palais des Sports de Toulon, Toulon; Attendance: 2,000; Referees: Kavulic, Skruzny (Czech Republic)
11 February 2011; 20:30	Kuharović, Radoičić 4	(12–22)	Mwasesa 10	Palais des Sports de Toulon, Toulon; Attendance: 2,000; Referees: Kavulic, Skruzny (Czech Republic)
11 February 2011; 20:30	3× (yellow card) 4× (suspension) 1× (red card)	Report	2× (yellow card)	Palais des Sports de Toulon, Toulon; Attendance: 2,000; Referees: Kavulic, Skruzny (Czech Republic)

==== Second leg ====
5 February 2011; 16:00	Fram Reykjavík (Iceland)	29 – 30	(Germany) HSG Blomberg-Lippe	Fram Sporthall, Reykjavík; Attendance: 500; Referees: van de Beek, Egberts (Netherlands)
5 February 2011; 16:00	Sigurðardóttir, Knútsdóttir 8	(15–13)	Hofmann 10	Fram Sporthall, Reykjavík; Attendance: 500; Referees: van de Beek, Egberts (Netherlands)
5 February 2011; 16:00	3× (yellow card) 6× (suspension)	Report	3× (yellow card) 8× (suspension) 1× (red card)	Fram Sporthall, Reykjavík; Attendance: 500; Referees: van de Beek, Egberts (Netherlands)

5 February 2011; 17:00	Rostov-Don (Russia)	30 – 28	(Romania) CS Tomis Constanţa	Dvorets Sporta Don, Rostov-on-Don; Attendance: 1,500; Referees: Argyridis, Mouttas (Cyprus)
5 February 2011; 17:00	Yartseva 7	(17–16)	Zamfir 10	Dvorets Sporta Don, Rostov-on-Don; Attendance: 1,500; Referees: Argyridis, Mouttas (Cyprus)
5 February 2011; 17:00	3× (yellow card) 5× (suspension) 1× (red card)	Report	3× (yellow card) 6× (suspension) 1× (red card)	Dvorets Sporta Don, Rostov-on-Don; Attendance: 1,500; Referees: Argyridis, Mouttas (Cyprus)

6 February 2011; 17:00	Zvezda Zvenigorod (Russia)	34 – 26	(Croatia) RK Lokomotiva Zagreb	Zvezda, Zvenigorod; Attendance: 1,000; Referees: Covalciuc, Covalciuc (Moldova)
6 February 2011; 17:00	Sen 8	(16–15)	Janković 6	Zvezda, Zvenigorod; Attendance: 1,000; Referees: Covalciuc, Covalciuc (Moldova)
6 February 2011; 17:00	3× (yellow card) 2× (suspension)	Report	3× (yellow card) 4× (suspension)	Zvezda, Zvenigorod; Attendance: 1,000; Referees: Covalciuc, Covalciuc (Moldova)

12 February 2011; 17:15	Tertnes HE (Norway)	30 – 23	(Sweden) LUGI HF	Haukelandshallen, Bergen; Attendance: 500; Referees: Eliasson, Gudjonsson (Iceland)
12 February 2011; 17:15	Reinkind 8	(16–12)	Rosengren Jacobsen 6	Haukelandshallen, Bergen; Attendance: 500; Referees: Eliasson, Gudjonsson (Iceland)
12 February 2011; 17:15	3× (yellow card) 3× (suspension)	Report	3× (yellow card) 6× (suspension)	Haukelandshallen, Bergen; Attendance: 500; Referees: Eliasson, Gudjonsson (Iceland)

12 February 2011; 18:00	Ferencvárosi TC (Hungary)	33 – 32	(Denmark) Viborg HK	FTC Aréna, Budapest; Attendance: 1,000; Referees: Bashmak, Frolov (Russia)
12 February 2011; 18:00	Tomori 9	(15–18)	Jurack 10	FTC Aréna, Budapest; Attendance: 1,000; Referees: Bashmak, Frolov (Russia)
12 February 2011; 18:00	2× (yellow card) 2× (suspension)	Report	2× (yellow card) 4× (suspension)	FTC Aréna, Budapest; Attendance: 1,000; Referees: Bashmak, Frolov (Russia)

13 February 2011; 12:30	CB Mar Alicante (Spain)	35 – 26	(Denmark) Frederiksberg IF	Pabellón Municipal Pitiu Rochel, Alicante; Attendance: 1,000; Referees: Pavićević, Ražnatović (Montenegro)
13 February 2011; 12:30	I. Ortuño, de Sousa 8	(14–9)	Skovgaard 8	Pabellón Municipal Pitiu Rochel, Alicante; Attendance: 1,000; Referees: Pavićević, Ražnatović (Montenegro)
13 February 2011; 12:30	3× (yellow card) 3× (suspension)	Report	2× (yellow card) 2× (suspension)	Pabellón Municipal Pitiu Rochel, Alicante; Attendance: 1,000; Referees: Pavićević, Ražnatović (Montenegro)

13 February 2011; 16:30	Toulon St-Cyr Var Handball (France)	36 – 26	(Serbia) ŽRK Knjaz Miloš	Palais des Sports de Toulon, Toulon; Attendance: 2,200; Referees: Kavulic, Skruzny (Czech Republic)
13 February 2011; 16:30	Tuvene 9	(16–14)	Petrović 8	Palais des Sports de Toulon, Toulon; Attendance: 2,200; Referees: Kavulic, Skruzny (Czech Republic)
13 February 2011; 16:30	3× (yellow card) 3× (suspension)	Report	3× (yellow card) 5× (suspension) 1× (red card)	Palais des Sports de Toulon, Toulon; Attendance: 2,200; Referees: Kavulic, Skruzny (Czech Republic)

13 February 2011; 17:00	Hypo Niederösterreich (Austria)	29 – 30	(France) Metz Handball	Bundessport- und Freizeitzentrum Südstadt, Maria Enzersdorf; Attendance: 700; Referees: Bonifert, Oláh (Hungary)
13 February 2011; 17:00	do Nascimento 12	(16–16)	Ognjenović 6	Bundessport- und Freizeitzentrum Südstadt, Maria Enzersdorf; Attendance: 700; Referees: Bonifert, Oláh (Hungary)
13 February 2011; 17:00	2× (yellow card) 3× (suspension)	Report	2× (yellow card) 5× (suspension)	Bundessport- und Freizeitzentrum Südstadt, Maria Enzersdorf; Attendance: 700; Referees: Bonifert, Oláh (Hungary)

=== Quarterfinals ===
Team 1	Agg.	Team 2	1st leg	2nd leg
LUGI HF (Sweden)	56–54	(Germany) HSG Blomberg-Lippe	24–29	32–25
CB Mar Alicante (Spain)	45–43	(Russia) Rostov-Don	24–22	21–21
Toulon St-Cyr Var Handball (France)	50–60	(Hungary) Ferencvárosi TC	24–23	26–37
Zvezda Zvenigorod (Russia)	55–57	(France) Metz Handball	26–29	29–28

==== First leg ====
13 March 2011; 12:30	CB Mar Alicante (Spain)	24 – 22	(Russia) Rostov-Don	Pabellón Municipal Pitiu Rochel, Alicante; Attendance: 1,000; Referees: Florescu, Duta (Romania)
13 March 2011; 12:30	I. Ortuño 7	(14–11)	Shymkute 8	Pabellón Municipal Pitiu Rochel, Alicante; Attendance: 1,000; Referees: Florescu, Duta (Romania)
13 March 2011; 12:30	3× (yellow card) 1× (suspension)	Report	3× (yellow card) 6× (suspension) 1× (red card)	Pabellón Municipal Pitiu Rochel, Alicante; Attendance: 1,000; Referees: Florescu, Duta (Romania)

13 March 2011; 17:00	Zvezda Zvenigorod (Russia)	26 – 29	(France) Metz Handball	Zvezda, Zvenigorod; Attendance: 1,000; Referees: Leandersson, Lindroos (Finland)
13 March 2011; 17:00	Vekova 7	(12–17)	Franić, Pineau 9	Zvezda, Zvenigorod; Attendance: 1,000; Referees: Leandersson, Lindroos (Finland)
13 March 2011; 17:00	3× (yellow card) 2× (suspension)	Report	3× (yellow card) 5× (suspension) 1× (red card)	Zvezda, Zvenigorod; Attendance: 1,000; Referees: Leandersson, Lindroos (Finland)

13 March 2011; 18:00	Toulon St-Cyr Var Handball (France)	24 – 23	(Hungary) Ferencvárosi TC	Palais des Sports de Toulon, Toulon; Attendance: 2,500; Referees: Veber, Pangerc (Slovenia)
13 March 2011; 18:00	Gnabouyou 6	(16–14)	Zácsik 7	Palais des Sports de Toulon, Toulon; Attendance: 2,500; Referees: Veber, Pangerc (Slovenia)
13 March 2011; 18:00	3× (yellow card) 2× (suspension)	Report	3× (yellow card) 3× (suspension)	Palais des Sports de Toulon, Toulon; Attendance: 2,500; Referees: Veber, Pangerc (Slovenia)

18 March 2011; 19:00	LUGI HF (Sweden)	24 – 29	(Germany) HSG Blomberg-Lippe	Kampa Halle, Minden; Attendance: 1,300; Referees: Tzaferopoulos, Bethmann (Greece)
18 March 2011; 19:00	Rosengren Jacobsen 8	(14–14)	Richter 8	Kampa Halle, Minden; Attendance: 1,300; Referees: Tzaferopoulos, Bethmann (Greece)
18 March 2011; 19:00	3× (yellow card) 4× (suspension)	Report	3× (yellow card) 5× (suspension)	Kampa Halle, Minden; Attendance: 1,300; Referees: Tzaferopoulos, Bethmann (Greece)

==== Second leg ====
19 March 2011; 16:00	HSG Blomberg-Lippe (Germany)	25 – 32	(Sweden) LUGI HF	Sporthalle Ulmenallee, Blomberg; Attendance: 600; Referees: Tzaferopoulos, Bethmann (Greece)
19 March 2011; 16:00	Hofmann, Langkeit, Richter 5	(14–17)	Rosengren Jacobsen 11	Sporthalle Ulmenallee, Blomberg; Attendance: 600; Referees: Tzaferopoulos, Bethmann (Greece)
19 March 2011; 16:00	3× (yellow card) 3× (suspension)	Report	3× (yellow card) 2× (suspension)	Sporthalle Ulmenallee, Blomberg; Attendance: 600; Referees: Tzaferopoulos, Bethmann (Greece)

19 March 2011; 19:30	Metz Handball (France)	28 – 29	(Russia) Zvezda Zvenigorod	Les Arènes, Metz; Attendance: 4,500; Referees: Jurinovic, Mrvica (Croatia)
19 March 2011; 19:30	Ognjenović 8	(17–16)	Postnova 9	Les Arènes, Metz; Attendance: 4,500; Referees: Jurinovic, Mrvica (Croatia)
19 March 2011; 19:30	2× (yellow card) 1× (suspension)	Report	3× (yellow card) 3× (suspension)	Les Arènes, Metz; Attendance: 4,500; Referees: Jurinovic, Mrvica (Croatia)

19 March 2011; 20:15	Ferencvárosi TC (Hungary)	37 – 26	(France) Toulon St-Cyr Var Handball	FTC Aréna, Budapest; Attendance: 1,200; Referees: Sivak, Dvorsky (Slovakia)
19 March 2011; 20:15	Szucsánszki, Tomori, Zácsik 9	(19–13)	Mwawesa 7	FTC Aréna, Budapest; Attendance: 1,200; Referees: Sivak, Dvorsky (Slovakia)
19 March 2011; 20:15	3× (yellow card) 7× (suspension)	Report	3× (yellow card) 6× (suspension)	FTC Aréna, Budapest; Attendance: 1,200; Referees: Sivak, Dvorsky (Slovakia)

20 March 2011; 17:00	Rostov-Don (Russia)	21 – 21	(Spain) CB Mar Alicante	Dvorets Sporta Don, Rostov-on-Don; Attendance: 1,400; Referees: Marić, Mašić (Serbia)
20 March 2011; 17:00	Zhuykova 5	(10–13)	I. Ortuño 6	Dvorets Sporta Don, Rostov-on-Don; Attendance: 1,400; Referees: Marić, Mašić (Serbia)
20 March 2011; 17:00	3× (yellow card) 2× (suspension)	Report	3× (yellow card) 3× (suspension)	Dvorets Sporta Don, Rostov-on-Don; Attendance: 1,400; Referees: Marić, Mašić (Serbia)

=== Semifinals ===
Team 1	Agg.	Team 2	1st leg	2nd leg
Metz Handball (France)	56–58	(Hungary) Ferencvárosi TC	27–31	29–27
LUGI HF (Sweden)	46–50	(Spain) CB Mar Alicante	24–22	22–28

==== First leg ====
9 April 2011; 19:30	LUGI HF (Sweden)	24 – 22	(Spain) CB Mar Alicante	Färs & Frosta Sparbank Arena, Lund; Attendance: 800; Referees: Rakytina, Tkachuk (Ukraine)
9 April 2011; 19:30	Adler 13	(11–10)	de Sousa 8	Färs & Frosta Sparbank Arena, Lund; Attendance: 800; Referees: Rakytina, Tkachuk (Ukraine)
9 April 2011; 19:30	2× (yellow card) 7× (suspension) 1× (red card)	Report	3× (yellow card) 3× (suspension)	Färs & Frosta Sparbank Arena, Lund; Attendance: 800; Referees: Rakytina, Tkachuk (Ukraine)

10 April 2011; 17:30	Metz Handball (France)	27 – 31	(Hungary) Ferencvárosi TC	Les Arènes, Metz; Attendance: 4,800; Referees: Muro, Rodríguez (Spain)
10 April 2011; 17:30	Ognjenović 6	(12–17)	Szádvári 8	Les Arènes, Metz; Attendance: 4,800; Referees: Muro, Rodríguez (Spain)
10 April 2011; 17:30	3× (yellow card) 2× (suspension)	Report	3× (yellow card) 6× (suspension)	Les Arènes, Metz; Attendance: 4,800; Referees: Muro, Rodríguez (Spain)

==== Second leg ====
16 April 2011; 20:00	CB Mar Alicante (Spain)	28 – 22	(Sweden) LUGI HF	Pabellón Municipal Pitiu Rochel, Alicante; Attendance: 1,300; Referees: Cîrligeanu, Bejinariu (Romania)
16 April 2011; 20:00	I. Ortuño 11	(13–9)	Adler, Lagerquist, Linnéll 4	Pabellón Municipal Pitiu Rochel, Alicante; Attendance: 1,300; Referees: Cîrligeanu, Bejinariu (Romania)
16 April 2011; 20:00	3× (yellow card) 7× (suspension)	Report	3× (yellow card) 5× (suspension)	Pabellón Municipal Pitiu Rochel, Alicante; Attendance: 1,300; Referees: Cîrligeanu, Bejinariu (Romania)

17 April 2011; 14:30	Ferencvárosi TC (Hungary)	27 – 29	(France) Metz Handball	FTC Aréna, Budapest; Attendance: 1,200; Referees: Nybo, Poulsen (Denmark)
17 April 2011; 14:30	Kovacsicz 6	(14–13)	Pineau 7	FTC Aréna, Budapest; Attendance: 1,200; Referees: Nybo, Poulsen (Denmark)
17 April 2011; 14:30	3× (yellow card) 3× (suspension)	Report	3× (yellow card) 4× (suspension)	FTC Aréna, Budapest; Attendance: 1,200; Referees: Nybo, Poulsen (Denmark)

=== Finals ===
Team 1	Agg.	Team 2	1st leg	2nd leg
Ferencvárosi TC (Hungary)	57–52	(Spain) CB Mar Alicante	34–29	23–23

==== First leg ====
8 May 2011; 15:00	Ferencvárosi TC (Hungary)	34 – 29	(Spain) CB Mar Alicante	Dabas-Diego Sportcsarnok, Dabas; Attendance: 2,500; Referees: Gousko, Repkin (Belarus)
8 May 2011; 15:00	Trufán 7	(17–12)	I. Ortuño 14	Dabas-Diego Sportcsarnok, Dabas; Attendance: 2,500; Referees: Gousko, Repkin (Belarus)
8 May 2011; 15:00	3× (yellow card) 2× (suspension)	Report	3× (yellow card) 4× (suspension)	Dabas-Diego Sportcsarnok, Dabas; Attendance: 2,500; Referees: Gousko, Repkin (Belarus)

==== Second leg ====
15 May 2011; 12:30	CB Mar Alicante (Spain)	23 – 23	(Hungary) Ferencvárosi TC	Pabellón Municipal Pitiu Rochel, Alicante; Attendance: 2,400; Referees: Vodopivec, Krasna (Slovenia)
15 May 2011; 12:30	I. Ortuño 8	(10–11)	Tomori 7	Pabellón Municipal Pitiu Rochel, Alicante; Attendance: 2,400; Referees: Vodopivec, Krasna (Slovenia)
15 May 2011; 12:30	3× (yellow card) 1× (suspension)	Report	3× (yellow card) 2× (suspension)	Pabellón Municipal Pitiu Rochel, Alicante; Attendance: 2,400; Referees: Vodopivec, Krasna (Slovenia)

EHF Cup Winners' Cup
2010–11 Winners

Ferencvárosi TC
Second Title

== Top scorers ==
Rank	Name	Team	Goals
1	(Spain) Isabel Ortuño	(Spain) CB Mar Alicante	87
2	(Hungary) Zita Szucsánszki	(Hungary) Ferencvárosi TC	65
3	(Sweden) Sabina Rosengren Jacobsen	(Sweden) LUGI HF	63
4	(Hungary) Zsuzsanna Tomori	(Hungary) Ferencvárosi TC	52
5	(Hungary) Szandra Zácsik	(Hungary) Ferencvárosi TC	49
6	(Hungary) Mónika Kovacsicz	(Hungary) Ferencvárosi TC	46
6	(Sweden) Monika Skogsberg	(Sweden) LUGI HF	46
8	(Germany) Sabrina Richter	(Germany) HSG Blomnberg-Lippe	42
9	(Sweden) Maria Adler	(Sweden) LUGI HF	41
10	(Iceland) Stella Sigurðardóttir	(Iceland) Fram Reykjavík	38
