= 2011–12 Women's EHF Cup Winners' Cup =

2011–12 EHF Women's Cup Winners' Cup
Tournament details
- Dates: 3 September 2011 – 13 May 2012
- Teams: 46

The 2011–12 EHF Women's Cup Winners' Cup is the 36th edition of the EHF Women's Cup Winners' Cup, the continental event for domestic cup winners in Europe. FTC-Rail Cargo Hungaria entered the competition as title holders, following triumphed over CB Mar Alicante with an aggregate score of 57–52 in the previous year's finals. The Hungarian team went to the final in this season as well, where they successfully defended their title against Viborg HK with a 31–30 win both on the home and away leg, producing a 62–60 aggregate score.

== Overview ==
=== Team allocation ===
According to the decision of the European Handball Federation made in April 2011, beginning from the 2011–12 season, the losers of the EHF Women's Champions League qualifiers will be relegated to the EHF Women's Cup Winners' Cup. The third and fourth placed teams of the first qualifying tournament together with the fourth placed clubs of the second qualifying tournament will enter the competition in the second round, while runners-up and third placed teams in the Qualifying Tournament 2 will join the cup in the third round.

The labels in the parentheses show how teams qualified for the EHF Cup Winners' Cup, if not directly via their domestic cup results:

- CL QT1: Losers from the EHF Champions League Qualifying Tournament 1
- CL QT2: Losers from the EHF Champions League Qualifying Tournament 2
- CL GS: Third placed teams from the EHF Champions League group stage
- TH: Title holders

Last 16
(Denmark) Randers HK ^{(CL GS)}	(Denmark) Viborg HK ^{(CL GS)}	(Norway) Byåsen HE ^{(CL GS)}	(Russia) HC Dinamo Volgograd ^{(CL GS)}
Round 3
(Hungary) DVSC-Fórum ^{(CL QT2)}	(Sweden) IK Sävehof ^{(CL QT2)}	(Norway) Tertnes HE ^{(CL QT2)}	(Poland) KGHM Metraco Zagłębie Lubin ^{(CL QT2)}
(Spain) BM Elda Prestigio ^{(CL QT2)}	(North Macedonia) ŽRK Metalurg ^{(CL QT2)}	(Serbia) RK Zaječar ^{(CL QT2)}	(Romania) U Jolidon Cluj-Napoca ^{(CL QT2)}
Round 2
(Austria) Union Korneuburg	(Bosnia and Herzegovina) HRK Katarina Mostar	(Belarus) SHC Gorodnichanka Grodno	(Cyprus) AC Latsia Kentriki Asfalistiki
(Czech Republic) HC Veselí nad Moravou ^{(CL QT2)}	(France) Toulon St-Cyr Var HB	(Germany) HC Leipzig	(Greece) AC Ormi-Loux Patras ^{(CL QT1)}
(Greece) OFN Ionias	(Hungary) Alba Fehérvár KC	(Hungary) Ferencvárosi TC ^{(TH)}	(Iceland) Fram Reykjavík
(Italy) HC Sassari	(Kosovo) KHF Kastrioti	(Netherlands) Westfriesland SEW	(Netherlands) MizuWaAi Dalfsen ^{(CL QT2)}
(Norway) Levanger HK	(Poland) Vistal Łączpol Gdynia	(Portugal) CDE Gil Eanes ^{(CL QT2)}	(Portugal) Madeira Andebol SAD
(Romania) HC Oţelul Galaţi	(Russia) Rostov-Don ^{(CL QT2)}	(Russia) Zvezda Zvenigorod	(Serbia) RK Jagodina
(Slovakia) HK IUVENTA Michalovce ^{(CL QT1)}	(Spain) BM Mar Sagunto	(Switzerland) LK Zug	(Switzerland) LC Brühl Handball ^{(CL QT1)}
(Turkey) Izmir BSB SK	(Turkey) Üsküdar Bld. SK ^{(CL QT1)}		
Round 1
(Belgium) HC Initia Hasselt	(Lithuania) HC Garliava-SM	(North Macedonia) RK Žito Prilep	(Slovenia) ŽRK Krka

=== Round and draw dates ===
Round	Draw date	First leg	Second leg
Round 1	26 July 2011	3–4 September 2011	10–11 September 2011
Round 2	26 July 2011	1–2 October 2011	8–9 October 2011
Round 3	11 October 2011	5–6 November 2011	12–13 November 2011
Last 16	15 November 2011	4–5 February 2012	11–12 February 2012
Quarterfinals	14 February 2012	3–4 March 2012	10–11 March 2012
Semifinals	13 March 2012	31 March – 1 April 2012	7–8 April 2012
Finals	10 April 2012	5–6 May 2012	12–13 May 2012

== Round 1 ==
The draw for both of the first and the second round took place on 26 July 2011 in the European Handball Federation headquarters in Vienna, performed by ŽRK Krka Novo Mesto president Andrej Petkovič. Pursuant to the competition rules, the clubs were divided into two pots, with the highest ranked teams sorted in the seeded pot and the other ones situated in the unseeded pot. In the drawing procedure, seeded clubs were paired to unseeded teams one after another to form match-ups.

=== Seedings ===
Pot 1	Pot 2
(Belgium) HC Initia Hasselt (North Macedonia) RK Žito Prilep	(Slovenia) ŽRK Krka (Lithuania) HC Garliava-SM

=== Matches ===
Team 1	Agg.	Team 2	1st leg	2nd leg
HC Initia Hasselt (Belgium)	45–68	(Slovenia) ŽRK Krka	24–32	21–36
HC Garliava-SM (Lithuania)	49–59	(North Macedonia) RK Žito Prilep	19–22	30–37

==== First leg ====
3 September 2011; 20:15	HC Initia Hasselt (Belgium)	24 – 32	(Slovenia) ŽRK Krka	Sporthal Alverberg, Hasselt; Attendance: 150; Referees: Kijauskaite, Zaliene (Lithuania)
3 September 2011; 20:15	Goossens 9	(11–16)	Dercar 7	Sporthal Alverberg, Hasselt; Attendance: 150; Referees: Kijauskaite, Zaliene (Lithuania)
3 September 2011; 20:15	3× (yellow card) 4× (suspension)	(Report)	3× (yellow card) 2× (suspension)	Sporthal Alverberg, Hasselt; Attendance: 150; Referees: Kijauskaite, Zaliene (Lithuania)

3 September 2011; 13:00	HC Garliava-SM (Lithuania)	19 – 22	(North Macedonia) RK Žito Prilep	Sport Centre, Garliava; Attendance: 600; Referees: Gutowska, Gutowska (Poland)
3 September 2011; 13:00	Butenaite 7	(10–12)	Klikovac 5	Sport Centre, Garliava; Attendance: 600; Referees: Gutowska, Gutowska (Poland)
3 September 2011; 13:00	2× (yellow card) 1× (suspension)	(Report)	3× (yellow card) 9× (suspension)	Sport Centre, Garliava; Attendance: 600; Referees: Gutowska, Gutowska (Poland)

==== Second leg ====
10 September 2011; 19:00	ŽRK Krka (Slovenia)	36 – 21	(Belgium) HC Initia Hasselt	Sportna Dvorana Marof, Novo Mesto; Attendance: 250; Referees: Nastase, Stancu (Romania)
10 September 2011; 19:00	Ackar, Videnic 6	(14–10)	Goossens 9	Sportna Dvorana Marof, Novo Mesto; Attendance: 250; Referees: Nastase, Stancu (Romania)
10 September 2011; 19:00	2× (yellow card) 6× (suspension)	(Report)	2× (yellow card) 4× (suspension)	Sportna Dvorana Marof, Novo Mesto; Attendance: 250; Referees: Nastase, Stancu (Romania)

10 September 2011; 19:00	RK Žito Prilep (North Macedonia)	37 – 20	(Lithuania) HC Garliava-SM	Sportska Arena SONCE, Prilep; Attendance: 1,000; Referees: Markovska, Vutov (Bulgaria)
10 September 2011; 19:00	Klikovac, Pavicevic 8	(19–12)	Mockeviute 9	Sportska Arena SONCE, Prilep; Attendance: 1,000; Referees: Markovska, Vutov (Bulgaria)
10 September 2011; 19:00	2× (yellow card) 5× (suspension)	(Report)	3× (yellow card) 4× (suspension)	Sportska Arena SONCE, Prilep; Attendance: 1,000; Referees: Markovska, Vutov (Bulgaria)

== Round 2 ==
=== Seedings ===
Pot 1	Pot 2
(Hungary) Ferencvárosi TC (Germany) HC Leipzig (Hungary) Alba Fehérvár KC (Spain) BM Mar Sagunto (Norway) Levanger HK (France) Toulon St-Cyr Var HB (Russia) Zvezda Zvenigorod (Romania) HC Oţelul Galaţi (Russia) Rostov-Don (Netherlands) MizuWaAi Dalfsen (Portugal) CDE Gil Eanes (Greece) AC Ormi-Loux Patras (Switzerland) LC Brühl Handball (Slovakia) HK IUVENTA Michalovce (Turkey) Üsküdar Bld. SK (Czech Republic) HC Veselí nad Moravou	(Serbia) RK Jagodina (Poland) Vistal Łączpol Gdynia (Turkey) Izmir BSB SK (Netherlands) Westfriesland SEW (Kosovo) KHF Kastrioti (Iceland) Fram Reykjavík (Greece) OFN Ionias (Austria) Union Korneuburg (Italy) HC Sassari (Portugal) Madeira Andebol SAD (Switzerland) LK Zug Handball (Belarus) SHC Gorodnichanka Grodno (Cyprus) AC Latsia Kentriki Asfalistiki (Bosnia and Herzegovina) HRK Katarina Mostar (Slovenia) ŽRK Krka (North Macedonia) RK Žito Prilep

=== Matches ===
Team 1	Agg.	Team 2	1st leg	2nd leg
AC Ormi-Loux Patras (Greece)	62 – 50	(Switzerland) LK Zug Handball	34 – 24	28 – 26
Fram Reykjavík (Iceland)	48 – 60	(Hungary) Alba Fehérvár KC	22 – 31	26 – 29
Ferencvárosi TC (Hungary)	95 – 41	(Austria) Union Korneuburg	51 – 18	44 – 23
HC Sassari (Italy)	56 – 77	(Slovakia) HK IUVENTA Michalovce	27 – 37	29 – 40
MizuWaAi Dalfsen (Netherlands)	71 – 44	(Greece) OFN Ionias	38 – 28	33 – 16
HRK Katarina Mostar (Bosnia and Herzegovina)	32 – 71	(France) Toulon St-Cyr Var HB	16 – 28	16 – 43
ŽRK Krka (Slovenia)	47 – 63	(Spain) BM Mar Sagunto	23 – 30	24 – 33
CDE Gil Eanes (Portugal)	36 – 42	(Netherlands) Westfriesland SEW	17 – 22	19 – 20
Madeira Andebol SAD (Portugal)	44 – 59	(Russia) Rostov-Don	28 – 31	16 – 28
HC Oţelul Galaţi (Romania)	84 – 35	(Kosovo) KHF Kastrioti	45 – 14	39 – 21
Vistal Łączpol Gdynia (Poland)	51 – 52	(Germany) HC Leipzig	25 – 28	26 – 24
Levanger HK (Norway)	69 – 35	(Turkey) Izmir BSB SK	35 – 18	34 – 17
Üsküdar Bld. SK (Turkey)	73 – 50	(Cyprus) AC Latsia Kentriki Asfalistiki	40 – 27	33 – 23
Zvezda Zvenigorod (Russia)	60 – 55	(Serbia) RK Jagodina	31 – 21	29 – 34
HC Veselí nad Moravou (Czech Republic)	42 – 42 (a)	(North Macedonia) RK Žito Prilep	24 – 17	18 – 25
LC Brühl Handball (Switzerland)	54 – 63	(Belarus) SHC Gorodnichanka Grodno	30 – 36	24 – 27

==== First leg ====
1 October 2011; 19:00	AC Ormi-Loux Patras (Greece)	34 – 24	(Switzerland) LK Zug Handball	Dimitris Tofalos Arena, Bozaitika; Attendance: 200; Referees: Scevola, Alperan (Italy)
1 October 2011; 19:00	Stankute 9	(19–12)	Hasler-Petrig 8	Dimitris Tofalos Arena, Bozaitika; Attendance: 200; Referees: Scevola, Alperan (Italy)
1 October 2011; 19:00	3× (yellow card) 3× (suspension)	(Report)	3× (yellow card) 3× (suspension)	Dimitris Tofalos Arena, Bozaitika; Attendance: 200; Referees: Scevola, Alperan (Italy)

8 October 2011; 18:00	Fram Reykjavík (Iceland)	22 – 31	(Hungary) Alba Fehérvár KC	Köfém Sportcsarnok, Székesfehérvár; Attendance: 500; Referees: Konjičanin, Konjičanin (Bosnia and Herzegovina)
8 October 2011; 18:00	Gunnarsdóttir 6	(11–19)	Trishchuk 9	Köfém Sportcsarnok, Székesfehérvár; Attendance: 500; Referees: Konjičanin, Konjičanin (Bosnia and Herzegovina)
8 October 2011; 18:00	3× (yellow card) 4× (suspension)	(Report)	3× (yellow card) 4× (suspension)	Köfém Sportcsarnok, Székesfehérvár; Attendance: 500; Referees: Konjičanin, Konjičanin (Bosnia and Herzegovina)

1 October 2011; 18:00	Ferencvárosi TC (Hungary)	51 – 18	(Austria) Union Korneuburg	Főtáv-FTC Aréna, Budapest; Attendance: 600; Referees: Covalciuc, Covalciuc (Moldova)
1 October 2011; 18:00	Kovacsicz 14	(28–12)	Rath 9	Főtáv-FTC Aréna, Budapest; Attendance: 600; Referees: Covalciuc, Covalciuc (Moldova)
1 October 2011; 18:00	3× (yellow card) 4× (suspension)	(Report)	2× (yellow card) 2× (suspension)	Főtáv-FTC Aréna, Budapest; Attendance: 600; Referees: Covalciuc, Covalciuc (Moldova)

30 September 2011; 17:30	HC Sassari (Italy)	27 – 37	(Slovakia) HK IUVENTA Michalovce	Chemkostav Arena, Michalovce; Attendance: 600; Referees: Boričić, Marković (Serbia)
30 September 2011; 17:30	Chernova 10	(14–17)	Tobiasová 9	Chemkostav Arena, Michalovce; Attendance: 600; Referees: Boričić, Marković (Serbia)
30 September 2011; 17:30	3× (yellow card) 3× (suspension)	(Report)	3× (yellow card) 5× (suspension) 1× (red card)	Chemkostav Arena, Michalovce; Attendance: 600; Referees: Boričić, Marković (Serbia)

1 October 2011; 18:00	MizuWaAi Dalfsen (Netherlands)	38 – 28	(Greece) OFN Ionias	Gymnastrium of Nea Ionia City, Nea Ionia; Attendance: 500; Referees: Harabagiu, Stanescu (Romania)
1 October 2011; 18:00	Schoenaker 7	(19–14)	Shlyakhova 9	Gymnastrium of Nea Ionia City, Nea Ionia; Attendance: 500; Referees: Harabagiu, Stanescu (Romania)
1 October 2011; 18:00	2× (yellow card) 2× (suspension)	(Report)	3× (yellow card) 4× (suspension)	Gymnastrium of Nea Ionia City, Nea Ionia; Attendance: 500; Referees: Harabagiu, Stanescu (Romania)

7 October 2011; 20:00	HRK Katarina Mostar (Bosnia and Herzegovina)	16 – 28	(France) Toulon St-Cyr Var HB	Gymnase de la Planquette, La Garde; Attendance: 800; Referees: Stokes, Barlett (Scotland)
7 October 2011; 20:00	Boras, Knezović, Mitrović 3	(11–15)	Mwasesa 11	Gymnase de la Planquette, La Garde; Attendance: 800; Referees: Stokes, Barlett (Scotland)
7 October 2011; 20:00	2× (yellow card) 6× (suspension)	(Report)	3× (yellow card) 3× (suspension)	Gymnase de la Planquette, La Garde; Attendance: 800; Referees: Stokes, Barlett (Scotland)

30 September 2011; 19:00	ŽRK Krka (Slovenia)	22 – 30	(Spain) BM Mar Sagunto	Pabellon Municipal "Rene Marigil", Sagunto; Attendance: 300; Referees: Riga, Thomassen (Belgium)
30 September 2011; 19:00	Ačkar 9	(14–13)	Alonso Jimenez 10	Pabellon Municipal "Rene Marigil", Sagunto; Attendance: 300; Referees: Riga, Thomassen (Belgium)
30 September 2011; 19:00	3× (yellow card) 10× (suspension) 2× (red card)	(Report)	2× (yellow card) 4× (suspension)	Pabellon Municipal "Rene Marigil", Sagunto; Attendance: 300; Referees: Riga, Thomassen (Belgium)

1 September 2011; 19:00	CDE Gil Eanes (Portugal)	17 – 22	(Netherlands) Westfriesland SEW	Pavilhao P. Municipal, Lagos; Attendance: 200; Referees: Karlubik, Struhar (Slovakia)
1 September 2011; 19:00	Lopes 6	(11–7)	Deen 5	Pavilhao P. Municipal, Lagos; Attendance: 200; Referees: Karlubik, Struhar (Slovakia)
1 September 2011; 19:00	3× (yellow card) 2× (suspension)	(Report)	3× (yellow card) 5× (suspension)	Pavilhao P. Municipal, Lagos; Attendance: 200; Referees: Karlubik, Struhar (Slovakia)

1 September 2011; 16:00	Madeira Andebol SAD (Portugal)	28 – 31	(Russia) Rostov-Don	Pavilhao Gimnodesportivo, Funchal; Attendance: 400; Referees: Bounouara, Sami (France)
1 September 2011; 16:00	Aguiar 6	(15–16)	Sen 7	Pavilhao Gimnodesportivo, Funchal; Attendance: 400; Referees: Bounouara, Sami (France)
1 September 2011; 16:00	3× (yellow card) 3× (suspension)	(Report)	3× (yellow card) 7× (suspension)	Pavilhao Gimnodesportivo, Funchal; Attendance: 400; Referees: Bounouara, Sami (France)

8 September 2011; 11:00	HC Oţelul Galaţi (Romania)	45 – 14	(Kosovo) KHF Kastrioti	Sala Sporturilor "Siderurgistul", Galaţi; Attendance: 700; Referees: Nabokau, Kulik (Belarus)
8 September 2011; 11:00	Tudor 10	(21 – 7)	Xhemaili 4	Sala Sporturilor "Siderurgistul", Galaţi; Attendance: 700; Referees: Nabokau, Kulik (Belarus)
8 September 2011; 11:00	3× (yellow card) 2× (suspension)	(Report	2× (yellow card) 1× (suspension)	Sala Sporturilor "Siderurgistul", Galaţi; Attendance: 700; Referees: Nabokau, Kulik (Belarus)

1 October 2011; 16:00	Vistal Łączpol Gdynia (Poland)	25 – 28	(Germany) HC Leipzig	Hala Sportowo Widowiskowa, Gdynia; Attendance: 1,000; Referees: Mykolaitis, Sniurevicius (Lithuania)
1 October 2011; 16:00	Kulwinska, Siodmak 5	(11–13)	Lyksborg 7	Hala Sportowo Widowiskowa, Gdynia; Attendance: 1,000; Referees: Mykolaitis, Sniurevicius (Lithuania)
1 October 2011; 16:00	1× (yellow card) 1× (suspension)	(Report)	3× (yellow card) 4× (suspension)	Hala Sportowo Widowiskowa, Gdynia; Attendance: 1,000; Referees: Mykolaitis, Sniurevicius (Lithuania)

1 October 2011; 17:00	Levanger HK (Norway)	35 – 18	(Turkey) Izmir BSB SK	Trønderhallen, Levanger; Attendance: 600; Referees: Lillepea, Kull (Norway)
1 October 2011; 17:00	Andersson 8	(17–8)	Atalar 5	Trønderhallen, Levanger; Attendance: 600; Referees: Lillepea, Kull (Norway)
1 October 2011; 17:00	2× (yellow card) 3× (suspension)	(Report)	2× (yellow card) 6× (suspension)	Trønderhallen, Levanger; Attendance: 600; Referees: Lillepea, Kull (Norway)

2 October 2011; 17:00	Üsküdar Bld. SK] (Turkey)	40 – 27	(Cyprus) AC Latsia Kentriki Asfalistiki	Haldun Alagaş Sports Hall, Istanbul; Attendance: 500; Referees: Veber, Pangerc (Slovenia)
2 October 2011; 17:00	Sahin, Yılmaz 5	(20–13)	Lebelionyte 15	Haldun Alagaş Sports Hall, Istanbul; Attendance: 500; Referees: Veber, Pangerc (Slovenia)
2 October 2011; 17:00	3× (yellow card) 7× (suspension) 1× (red card)	(Report)	3× (yellow card) 1× (suspension)	Haldun Alagaş Sports Hall, Istanbul; Attendance: 500; Referees: Veber, Pangerc (Slovenia)

1 October 2011; 17:00	Zvezda Zvenigorod (Russia)	31 – 21	(Serbia) RK Jagodina	Sport Hall "Zvezda", Zvenigorod; Attendance: 900; Referees: Aliyev, Aghakishiyev (Azerbaijan)
1 October 2011; 17:00	Kuznetcova 8	(18–7)	Dmitrović 8	Sport Hall "Zvezda", Zvenigorod; Attendance: 900; Referees: Aliyev, Aghakishiyev (Azerbaijan)
1 October 2011; 17:00	3× (yellow card) 2× (suspension)	(Report)	3× (yellow card) 3× (suspension)	Sport Hall "Zvezda", Zvenigorod; Attendance: 900; Referees: Aliyev, Aghakishiyev (Azerbaijan)

1 October 2011; 18:00	HC Veselí nad Moravou (Czech Republic)	24 – 17	(North Macedonia) RK Žito Prilep	TEZA Hodonín, Hodonín; Attendance: 400; Referees: Mishchuk, Rozhkov (Ukraine)
1 October 2011; 18:00	Chmelarova 10	(14–10)	Klikovac, Pavičević, Steriova 4	TEZA Hodonín, Hodonín; Attendance: 400; Referees: Mishchuk, Rozhkov (Ukraine)
1 October 2011; 18:00	2× (yellow card) 2× (suspension)	(Report)	2× (yellow card) 5× (suspension)	TEZA Hodonín, Hodonín; Attendance: 400; Referees: Mishchuk, Rozhkov (Ukraine)

8 October 2011; 18:00	SHC Gorodnichanka Grodno (Belarus)	36 – 30	(Switzerland) LC Brühl Handball	Sporthalle Kreuzbleiche, St. Gallen; Attendance: 500; Referees: Mandak, Rudinsky (Slovakia)
8 October 2011; 18:00	Vasileuskaya 12	(18–15)	Schelffold 8	Sporthalle Kreuzbleiche, St. Gallen; Attendance: 500; Referees: Mandak, Rudinsky (Slovakia)
8 October 2011; 18:00	3× (yellow card) 4× (suspension)	(Report)	2× (yellow card) 3× (suspension)	Sporthalle Kreuzbleiche, St. Gallen; Attendance: 500; Referees: Mandak, Rudinsky (Slovakia)

==== Second leg ====
2 October 2011; 17:30	LK Zug Handball (Switzerland)	26 – 28	(Greece) AC Ormi-Loux Patras	Dimitris Tofalos Arena, Bozaitika; Attendance: 100; Referees: Scevola, Alperan (Italy)
2 October 2011; 17:30	Hasler-Petrig 9	(17–13)	Niparaviciene, Stratou 6	Dimitris Tofalos Arena, Bozaitika; Attendance: 100; Referees: Scevola, Alperan (Italy)
2 October 2011; 17:30	3× (yellow card) 4× (suspension)	(Report)	3× (yellow card) 5× (suspension) 1× (red card)	Dimitris Tofalos Arena, Bozaitika; Attendance: 100; Referees: Scevola, Alperan (Italy)

9 October 2011; 18:00	Alba Fehérvár KC (Hungary)	29 – 26	(Iceland) Fram Reykjavík	Köfém Sportcsarnok, Székesfehérvár; Attendance: 550; Referees: Konjičanin, Konjičanin (Bosnia and Herzegovina)
9 October 2011; 18:00	Trishchuk 10	(13–15)	Gunarsdottir 10	Köfém Sportcsarnok, Székesfehérvár; Attendance: 550; Referees: Konjičanin, Konjičanin (Bosnia and Herzegovina)
9 October 2011; 18:00	3× (yellow card) 2× (suspension)	(Report)	3× (yellow card) 5× (suspension)	Köfém Sportcsarnok, Székesfehérvár; Attendance: 550; Referees: Konjičanin, Konjičanin (Bosnia and Herzegovina)

8 October 2011; 18:00	Union Korneuburg (Austria)	23 – 44	(Hungary) Ferencvárosi TC	Guggenbergerhalle 2, Korneuburg; Attendance: 400; Referees: Sager, Styger (Switzerland)
8 October 2011; 18:00	Rath 6	(10–19)	Szucsánszki 8	Guggenbergerhalle 2, Korneuburg; Attendance: 400; Referees: Sager, Styger (Switzerland)
8 October 2011; 18:00	3× (yellow card) 1× (suspension)	(Report)	3× (yellow card) 3× (suspension)	Guggenbergerhalle 2, Korneuburg; Attendance: 400; Referees: Sager, Styger (Switzerland)

1 October 2011; 17:30	HK IUVENTA Michalovce (Slovakia)	40 – 29	(Italy) HC Sassari	Chemkostav Arena, Michalovce; Attendance: 800; Referees: Borićič, Marković (Serbia)
1 October 2011; 17:30	Kovalickova 8	(22–12)	Onnis 6	Chemkostav Arena, Michalovce; Attendance: 800; Referees: Borićič, Marković (Serbia)
1 October 2011; 17:30	3× (yellow card) 4× (suspension)	(Report)	3× (yellow card) 5× (suspension)	Chemkostav Arena, Michalovce; Attendance: 800; Referees: Borićič, Marković (Serbia)

2 October 2011; 18:00	OFN Ionias (Greece)	16 – 33	(Netherlands) MizuWaAi Dalfsen	Gymnastrium of Nea Ionia City, Nea Ionia; Attendance: 300; Referees: Harabagiu, Stanescu (Romania)
2 October 2011; 18:00	Shlyakhova 7	(7–14)	Schutte 6	Gymnastrium of Nea Ionia City, Nea Ionia; Attendance: 300; Referees: Harabagiu, Stanescu (Romania)
2 October 2011; 18:00	2× (yellow card) 5× (suspension) 1× (red card)	(Report)	2× (yellow card) 3× (suspension)	Gymnastrium of Nea Ionia City, Nea Ionia; Attendance: 300; Referees: Harabagiu, Stanescu (Romania)

9 October 2011; 17:00	Toulon St-Cyr Var HB (France)	43 – 16	(Bosnia and Herzegovina) HRK Katarina Mostar	Palais des Sports de Toulon, Toulon; Attendance: 1,300; Referees: Stokes, Bartlett (Scotland)
9 October 2011; 17:00	Gondo, Gnabouyou 6	(17–6)	Boras, Mikulic 4	Palais des Sports de Toulon, Toulon; Attendance: 1,300; Referees: Stokes, Bartlett (Scotland)
9 October 2011; 17:00	3× (yellow card) 3× (suspension)	(Report)	3× (yellow card) 6× (suspension)	Palais des Sports de Toulon, Toulon; Attendance: 1,300; Referees: Stokes, Bartlett (Scotland)

1 October 2011; 19:00	BM Mar Sagunto (Spain)	33 – 24	(Slovenia) ŽRK Krka	Pabellon Municipal "Rene Marigil", Sagunto; Attendance: 300; Referees: Riga, Thomassen (Belgium)
1 October 2011; 19:00	Alonso 7	(19–13)	Okleščen 9	Pabellon Municipal "Rene Marigil", Sagunto; Attendance: 300; Referees: Riga, Thomassen (Belgium)
1 October 2011; 19:00	3× (yellow card) 3× (suspension)	(Report)	3× (yellow card) 6× (suspension)	Pabellon Municipal "Rene Marigil", Sagunto; Attendance: 300; Referees: Riga, Thomassen (Belgium)

8 October 2011; 18:00	Westfriesland SEW (Netherlands)	20 – 19	(Portugal) CDE Gil Eanes	Sportcentre 't Span, Wognum; Attendance: 500; Referees: Kijauskaite, Zaliene (Lithuania)
8 October 2011; 18:00	Bouwer, Wenker 6	(9–10)	Lopes 9	Sportcentre 't Span, Wognum; Attendance: 500; Referees: Kijauskaite, Zaliene (Lithuania)
8 October 2011; 18:00	3× (yellow card) 1× (suspension)	(Report)	3× (yellow card) 2× (suspension)	Sportcentre 't Span, Wognum; Attendance: 500; Referees: Kijauskaite, Zaliene (Lithuania)

8 October 2011; 17:00	Rostov-Don (Russia)	28 – 16	(Portugal) Madeira Andebol SAD	Palace of Sport "Sport-Don", Rostov-Don; Attendance: 2,000; Referees: Katsikis, Michailidis (Greece)
8 October 2011; 17:00	Svitanko 7	(19–6)	Aguiar 4	Palace of Sport "Sport-Don", Rostov-Don; Attendance: 2,000; Referees: Katsikis, Michailidis (Greece)
8 October 2011; 17:00	3× (yellow card) 2× (suspension)	(Report)	2× (yellow card)	Palace of Sport "Sport-Don", Rostov-Don; Attendance: 2,000; Referees: Katsikis, Michailidis (Greece)

9 October 2011; 11:00	KHF Kastrioti (Kosovo)	21 – 39	(Romania) HC Oţelul Galaţi	Sala Sporturilor "Siderurgistul", Galaţi; Attendance: 300; Referees: Nabokau, Kulik (Belarus)
9 October 2011; 11:00	Xhemaili 8	(11–19)	Artean 11	Sala Sporturilor "Siderurgistul", Galaţi; Attendance: 300; Referees: Nabokau, Kulik (Belarus)
9 October 2011; 11:00	2× (yellow card) 2× (suspension)	(Report)	2× (yellow card) 1× (suspension)	Sala Sporturilor "Siderurgistul", Galaţi; Attendance: 300; Referees: Nabokau, Kulik (Belarus)

9 October 2011; 15:00	HC Leipzig (Germany)	24 – 26	(Poland) Vistal Łączpol Gdynia	Arena Leipzig, Leipzig; Attendance: 2,500; Referees: Maric, Masic (Serbia)
9 October 2011; 15:00	Lang, Rösler 6	(16–15)	Glowinska 7	Arena Leipzig, Leipzig; Attendance: 2,500; Referees: Maric, Masic (Serbia)
9 October 2011; 15:00	3× (yellow card) 4× (suspension)	(Report)	2× (yellow card) 2× (suspension)	Arena Leipzig, Leipzig; Attendance: 2,500; Referees: Maric, Masic (Serbia)

2 October 2011; 18:00	Izmir BSB SK (Turkey)	17 – 34	(Norway) Levanger HK	Tronderhallen, Levanger; Attendance: 700; Referees: Lillepea, Kull (Estonia)
2 October 2011; 18:00	Atalar, Pirincci 5	(10–17)	Loken 8	Tronderhallen, Levanger; Attendance: 700; Referees: Lillepea, Kull (Estonia)
2 October 2011; 18:00	2× (yellow card) 3× (suspension) 1× (red card)	(Report)	3× (yellow card) 3× (suspension)	Tronderhallen, Levanger; Attendance: 700; Referees: Lillepea, Kull (Estonia)

9 October 2011; 19:00	AC Latsia Kentriki Asfalistiki (Cyprus)	23 – 33	(Turkey) Üsküdar Bld. SK	Sports Hall Soteris Messios, Latsia; Attendance: 400; Referees: Prastalo, Todorovic (Bosnia and Herzegovina)
9 October 2011; 19:00	Lebelionyte 11	(10–18)	Sevgilican 8	Sports Hall Soteris Messios, Latsia; Attendance: 400; Referees: Prastalo, Todorovic (Bosnia and Herzegovina)
9 October 2011; 19:00	2× (yellow card) 1× (suspension)	(Report)	3× (yellow card) 5× (suspension) 1× (red card)	Sports Hall Soteris Messios, Latsia; Attendance: 400; Referees: Prastalo, Todorovic (Bosnia and Herzegovina)

8 October 2011; 19:00	RK Jagodina (Serbia)	34 – 29	(Russia) Zvezda Zvenigorod	Sportska hala JASSA, Jagodina; Attendance: 1,800; Referees: Cîrligeanu, Florescu (Romania)
8 October 2011; 19:00	Janjić 8	(22–15)	Kuznetcova 9	Sportska hala JASSA, Jagodina; Attendance: 1,800; Referees: Cîrligeanu, Florescu (Romania)
8 October 2011; 19:00	3× (yellow card) 3× (suspension)	(Report)	2× (yellow card) 1× (suspension)	Sportska hala JASSA, Jagodina; Attendance: 1,800; Referees: Cîrligeanu, Florescu (Romania)

8 October 2011; 19:00	RK Žito Prilep (North Macedonia)	25 – 18	(Czech Republic) HC Veselí nad Moravou	Sportska Arena SONCE, Prilep; Attendance: 500; Referees: Nastase, Stancu (Romania)
8 October 2011; 19:00	Pavičević 6	(13–8)	Flekova 6	Sportska Arena SONCE, Prilep; Attendance: 500; Referees: Nastase, Stancu (Romania)
8 October 2011; 19:00	3× (yellow card) 5× (suspension)	(Report)	2× (yellow card) 8× (suspension)	Sportska Arena SONCE, Prilep; Attendance: 500; Referees: Nastase, Stancu (Romania)

9 October 2011; 17:00	LC Brühl Handball (Switzerland)	24 – 27	(Belarus) SHC Gorodnichanka Grodno	Sporthalle Kreuzbleiche, St. Gallen; Attendance: 500; Referees: Mandak, Rudinsky (Slovakia)
9 October 2011; 17:00	Scheffold 8	(11–11)	Vasileuskaya 9	Sporthalle Kreuzbleiche, St. Gallen; Attendance: 500; Referees: Mandak, Rudinsky (Slovakia)
9 October 2011; 17:00	2× (yellow card) 5× (suspension) 1× (red card)	(Report)	3× (yellow card) 7× (suspension)	Sporthalle Kreuzbleiche, St. Gallen; Attendance: 500; Referees: Mandak, Rudinsky (Slovakia)

== Round 3 ==
The draw of the third round matches took place on 11 October 2011 in the EHF headquarters Vienna with the contribution of Boško Ničić, mayor of Zaječar and president of RK Zaječar. The sixteen winners of the second round of the EHF Cup Winners' Cup were joined by the second and third placed teams of the EHF Champions League second qualifying tournaments to form a field of 24 teams. The eight clubs that were relegated from the Champions League together with the four highest ranked sides from the Cup Winners' Cup were selected into the first pot, while the remaining teams in the second pot. Teams were drawn into pairs with the first selected club having the right to organize the first leg on home ground.

=== Seedings ===
Pot 1	Pot 2
(Hungary) Debreceni VSC (North Macedonia) ŽRK Metalurg (Romania) U Jolidon Cluj-Napoca (Sweden) IK Sävehof (Spain) BM Elda Prestigio (Norway) Tertnes HE (Poland) KGHM Metraco Zagłębie Lubin (Serbia) RK Zaječar (Spain) BM Mar Sagunto (Germany) HC Leipzig (Hungary) Alba Fehérvár KC (Hungary) Ferencvárosi TC	(Belarus) SHC Gorodnichanka Grodno (Czech Republic) HC Veselí nad Moravou (France) Toulon St-Cyr Var Handball (Netherlands) Westfriesland SEW (Greece) AC Ormi-Loux Patras (Netherlands) MizuWaAi Dalfsen (Norway) Levanger HK (Romania) HC Oţelul Galaţi (Russia) Rostov-Don (Russia) Zvezda Zvenigorod (Slovakia) HK IUVENTA Michalovce (Turkey) Üsküdar Bld. SK

=== Matches ===
Team 1	Agg.	Team 2	1st leg	2nd leg
AC Ormi-Loux Patras (Greece)	53 – 72	(Hungary) Debreceni VSC	27 – 31	26 – 41
Tertnes HE (Norway)	48 – 62	(Russia) Zvezda Zvenigorod	23 – 29	25 – 33
KGHM Metraco Zagłębie Lubin (Poland)	53 – 43	(Czech Republic) HC Veselí nad Moravou	29 – 18	24 – 25
HC Oţelul Galaţi (Romania)	53 – 54	(North Macedonia) ŽRK Metalurg	30 – 25	23 – 29
BM Mar Sagunto (Spain)	56 – 49	(Belarus) SHC Gorodnichanka Grodno	30 – 28	26 – 21
MizuWaAi Dalfsen (Netherlands)	46 – 57	(Serbia) RK Zaječar	24 – 27	22 – 30
Alba Fehérvár KC (Hungary)	62 – 54	(Turkey) Üsküdar Bld. SK	35 – 23	27 – 31
Toulon St-Cyr Var Handball (France)	52 – 53	(Germany) HC Leipzig	31 – 27	21 – 26
Westfriesland SEW (Netherlands)	40 – 72	(Hungary) Ferencvárosi TC	19 – 34	21 – 38
BM Elda Prestigio (Spain)	45 – 66	(Russia) Rostov-Don	21 – 32	24 – 34
U Jolidon Cluj-Napoca (Romania)	59 – 40	(Norway) Levanger HK	27 – 23	32 – 17
HK IUVENTA Michalovce (Slovakia)	57 – 62	(Sweden) IK Sävehof	33 – 27	24 – 25

== Last 16 ==
=== Seedings ===
Pot 1	Pot 2
(Hungary) Ferencvárosi TC (Hungary) Alba Fehérvár KC (Denmark) Randers HK (Denmark) Viborg HK (Norway) Byåsen HE (Russia) HC Dinamo Volgograd (Germany) HC Leipzig (Spain) BM Mar Sagunto	(Hungary) Debreceni VSC (North Macedonia) ŽRK Metalurg (Poland) KGHM Metraco Zagłębie Lubin (Romania) U Jolidon Cluj-Napoca (Russia) Rostov-Don (Russia) Zvezda Zvenigorod (Serbia) RK Zaječar (Sweden) IK Sävehof

=== Matches ===
Team 1	Agg.	Team 2	1st leg	2nd leg
Rostov-Don (Russia)	46 – 54	(Hungary) Ferencvárosi TC	23 – 22	23 – 32
U Jolidon Cluj-Napoca (Romania)	55 – 64	(Russia) HC Dinamo Volgograd	24 – 29	31 – 35
Byåsen HE (Norway)	56 – 46	(Poland) KGHM Metraco Zagłębie Lubin	37 – 23	19 – 23
HC Leipzig (Germany)	48 – 39	(North Macedonia) ŽRK Metalurg	25 – 13	23 – 26
BM Mar Sagunto (Spain)	53 – 59	(Hungary) Debreceni VSC	18 – 24	28 – 28
Alba Fehérvár KC (Hungary)	41 – 44	(Serbia) RK Zaječar	24 – 20	17 – 24
Viborg HK (Denmark)	66 – 54	(Sweden) IK Sävehof	37 – 26	29 – 28
Randers HK (Denmark)	49 – 55	(Russia) Zvezda Zvenigorod	26 – 25	23 – 30

==== First leg ====
5 February 2012; 17:00	Rostov-Don (Russia)	23 – 22	(Hungary) Ferencvárosi TC	Palace of Sport "Sport-Don", Rostov-Don; Attendance: 2,300; Referees: Frieser, Frieser (Czech Republic)
5 February 2012; 17:00	Shymkute 8	(13–8)	Živković 7	Palace of Sport "Sport-Don", Rostov-Don; Attendance: 2,300; Referees: Frieser, Frieser (Czech Republic)
5 February 2012; 17:00	3× (yellow card) 4× (suspension)	(Report)	3× (yellow card) 2× (suspension)	Palace of Sport "Sport-Don", Rostov-Don; Attendance: 2,300; Referees: Frieser, Frieser (Czech Republic)

4 February 2012; 17:00	U Jolidon Cluj-Napoca (Romania)	24 – 29	(Russia) HC Dinamo Volgograd	Horia Demian, Cluj-Napoca; Attendance: 1,900; Referees: Rakytina, Tkachuk (Ukraine)
4 February 2012; 17:00	Ani Senocico 7	(11–15)	Kochetova, Stepanova 5	Horia Demian, Cluj-Napoca; Attendance: 1,900; Referees: Rakytina, Tkachuk (Ukraine)
4 February 2012; 17:00	3× (yellow card) 1× (suspension)	(Report)	2× (yellow card) 5× (suspension)	Horia Demian, Cluj-Napoca; Attendance: 1,900; Referees: Rakytina, Tkachuk (Ukraine)

5 February 2012; 18:00	Byåsen HE (Norway)	37 – 23	(Poland) KGHM Metraco Zagłębie Lubin	Trondheim Spektrum, Trondheim; Attendance: 950; Referees: Kaveshnikov, Plotnikov (Russia)
5 February 2012; 18:00	Herrem, Toumi 10	(20–14)	Obrusiewicz 8	Trondheim Spektrum, Trondheim; Attendance: 950; Referees: Kaveshnikov, Plotnikov (Russia)
5 February 2012; 18:00	3× (yellow card) 3× (suspension)	(Report)	2× (yellow card) 5× (suspension)	Trondheim Spektrum, Trondheim; Attendance: 950; Referees: Kaveshnikov, Plotnikov (Russia)

5 February 2012; 15:00	HC Leipzig (Germany)	25 – 13	(North Macedonia) ŽRK Metalurg	Arena Leipzig, Leipzig; Attendance: 3,300; Referees: Siewert Delle, Engbert (Sweden)
5 February 2012; 15:00	Augsburg, Ommundsen 6	(10–6)	Krpez 5	Arena Leipzig, Leipzig; Attendance: 3,300; Referees: Siewert Delle, Engbert (Sweden)
5 February 2012; 15:00	2× (yellow card) 2× (suspension)	(Report)	3× (yellow card) 3× (suspension)	Arena Leipzig, Leipzig; Attendance: 3,300; Referees: Siewert Delle, Engbert (Sweden)

10 February 2012; 18:00	BM Mar Sagunto (Spain)	25 – 31	(Hungary) Debreceni VSC	Hódos Imre Rendezvénycsarnok, Debrecen; Attendance: 1,100; Referees: Marić, Mašić (Serbia)
10 February 2012; 18:00	Escribano 8	(12–14)	Kudor 8	Hódos Imre Rendezvénycsarnok, Debrecen; Attendance: 1,100; Referees: Marić, Mašić (Serbia)
10 February 2012; 18:00	3× (yellow card) 3× (suspension)	(Report)	3× (yellow card) 4× (suspension)	Hódos Imre Rendezvénycsarnok, Debrecen; Attendance: 1,100; Referees: Marić, Mašić (Serbia)

5 February 2012; 16:00	Alba Fehérvár KC (Hungary)	24 – 20	(Serbia) RK Zaječar	Köfém Sportcsarnok, Székesfehérvár; Attendance: 1,200; Referees: Mayeuski, Tereshchenkov (Belarus)
5 February 2012; 16:00	Trishchuk 9	(11–6)	Peraicia 7	Köfém Sportcsarnok, Székesfehérvár; Attendance: 1,200; Referees: Mayeuski, Tereshchenkov (Belarus)
5 February 2012; 16:00	3× (yellow card) 1× (suspension)	(Report)	3× (yellow card) 3× (suspension) 1× (red card)	Köfém Sportcsarnok, Székesfehérvár; Attendance: 1,200; Referees: Mayeuski, Tereshchenkov (Belarus)

5 February 2012; 15:00	IK Sävehof (Sweden)	28 – 29	(Denmark) Viborg HK	Partillebohallen, Partille; Attendance: 1,200; Referees: Crnojević, Kostecki Radić (Croatia)
5 February 2012; 15:00	Alm 8	(11–15)	Jurack 7	Partillebohallen, Partille; Attendance: 1,200; Referees: Crnojević, Kostecki Radić (Croatia)
5 February 2012; 15:00	3× (yellow card) 3× (suspension)	(Report)	2× (yellow card) 1× (suspension)	Partillebohallen, Partille; Attendance: 1,200; Referees: Crnojević, Kostecki Radić (Croatia)

4 February 2012; 14:30	Randers HK (Denmark)	26 – 25	(Russia) Zvezda Zvenigorod	Skyline - Elro Arena, Randers; Attendance: 1,300; Referees: Cvetko, Kavalar (Slovenia)
4 February 2012; 14:30	Dalby 11	(11–10)	Postnova 9	Skyline - Elro Arena, Randers; Attendance: 1,300; Referees: Cvetko, Kavalar (Slovenia)
4 February 2012; 14:30	3× (yellow card) 3× (suspension)	(Report)	3× (yellow card) 3× (suspension)	Skyline - Elro Arena, Randers; Attendance: 1,300; Referees: Cvetko, Kavalar (Slovenia)

==== Second leg ====
11 February 2012; 18:00	Ferencvárosi TC (Hungary)	32 – 23	(Russia) Rostov-Don	Főtáv-FTC Aréna, Budapest; Attendance: 1,200; Referees: Pavel, State (Romania)
11 February 2012; 18:00	Zácsik 10	(15–11)	Turey 5	Főtáv-FTC Aréna, Budapest; Attendance: 1,200; Referees: Pavel, State (Romania)
11 February 2012; 18:00	3× (yellow card) 4× (suspension)	(Report)	2× (yellow card) 5× (suspension)	Főtáv-FTC Aréna, Budapest; Attendance: 1,200; Referees: Pavel, State (Romania)

11 February 2012; 14:00	HC Dinamo Volgograd (Russia)	35 – 31	(Romania) U Jolidon Cluj-Napoca	Sport Hall "Dinamo", Volgograd; Attendance: 1,400; Referees: Malasinskas, Grigalionis (Lithuania)
11 February 2012; 14:00	Khmyrova 11	(18–22)	Ani Senocico, Chintoan 7	Sport Hall "Dinamo", Volgograd; Attendance: 1,400; Referees: Malasinskas, Grigalionis (Lithuania)
11 February 2012; 14:00	3× (yellow card) 4× (suspension)	(Report)	3× (yellow card) 4× (suspension) 1× (red card)	Sport Hall "Dinamo", Volgograd; Attendance: 1,400; Referees: Malasinskas, Grigalionis (Lithuania)

11 February 2012; 17:00	KGHM Metraco Zagłębie Lubin (Poland)	23 – 19	(Norway) Byåsen HE	Hala sportowa SP 14, Lubin; Attendance: 350; Referees: Buache, Meyer (Switzerland)
11 February 2012; 17:00	Bader, Zaleczna 6	(10–9)	Alstad, Tomac 5	Hala sportowa SP 14, Lubin; Attendance: 350; Referees: Buache, Meyer (Switzerland)
11 February 2012; 17:00	3× (yellow card) 5× (suspension)	(Report)	2× (yellow card) 1× (suspension)	Hala sportowa SP 14, Lubin; Attendance: 350; Referees: Buache, Meyer (Switzerland)

11 February 2012; 18:15	Viborg HK (Denmark)	37 – 26	(Sweden) IK Sävehof	Viborg Stadionhall, Viborg; Attendance: 1,700; Referees: Antić, Jakovljević (Serbia)
11 February 2012; 18:15	Althaus, Fisker, Larsen 6	(17–14)	Alm, Odén 6	Viborg Stadionhall, Viborg; Attendance: 1,700; Referees: Antić, Jakovljević (Serbia)
11 February 2012; 18:15	3× (yellow card) 2× (suspension)	(Report)	3× (yellow card) 3× (suspension)	Viborg Stadionhall, Viborg; Attendance: 1,700; Referees: Antić, Jakovljević (Serbia)

11 February 2012; 19:00	RK Zaječar (Serbia)	24 – 17	(Hungary) Alba Fehérvár KC	Src Kraljevica, Zaječar; Attendance: 2,300; Referees: Mishchuk, Rozhkov (Ukraine)
11 February 2012; 19:00	Mangué 6	(14–10)	Tilinger 7	Src Kraljevica, Zaječar; Attendance: 2,300; Referees: Mishchuk, Rozhkov (Ukraine)
11 February 2012; 19:00	3× (yellow card) 4× (suspension)	(Report)	3× (yellow card) 3× (suspension)	Src Kraljevica, Zaječar; Attendance: 2,300; Referees: Mishchuk, Rozhkov (Ukraine)

11 February 2012; 17:00	Zvezda Zvenigorod (Russia)	30 – 23	(Denmark) Randers HK	Sport Hall "Zvezda", Zvenigorod; Attendance: 1,000; Referees: Konjičanin, Konjičanin (Bosnia and Herzegovina)
11 February 2012; 17:00	Pasičnik 7	(15–15)	Wörz 7	Sport Hall "Zvezda", Zvenigorod; Attendance: 1,000; Referees: Konjičanin, Konjičanin (Bosnia and Herzegovina)
11 February 2012; 17:00	3× (yellow card) 4× (suspension)	(Report)	3× (yellow card) 2× (suspension)	Sport Hall "Zvezda", Zvenigorod; Attendance: 1,000; Referees: Konjičanin, Konjičanin (Bosnia and Herzegovina)

12 February 2012; 17:00	ŽRK Metalurg (North Macedonia)	26 – 23	(Germany) HC Leipzig	Sportska Sala "Avtokomanda", Skopje; Attendance: 600; Referees: Cîrligeanu, Florescu (Romania)
12 February 2012; 17:00	Krpez 10	(10–13)	Kudłacz 9	Sportska Sala "Avtokomanda", Skopje; Attendance: 600; Referees: Cîrligeanu, Florescu (Romania)
12 February 2012; 17:00	3× (yellow card) 2× (suspension)	(Report)	3× (yellow card) 2× (suspension)	Sportska Sala "Avtokomanda", Skopje; Attendance: 600; Referees: Cîrligeanu, Florescu (Romania)

== Quarterfinals ==
The quarterfinals draw was carried out on 14 February 2012 in the EHF Headquarters in Vienna, Austria. Unlike in the earlier part of the competition, there was no seedings, but all the teams were pulled from the same pot. Teams drawn first from the pot were granted to play the first leg on home ground.

Team 1	Agg.	Team 2	1st leg	2nd leg
Byåsen HE (Norway)	48–55	(Germany) HC Leipzig	28–29	20–26
RK Zaječar (Serbia)	53–63	(Russia) HC Dinamo Volgograd	28–31	25–32
Ferencvárosi TC (Hungary)	67–55	(Russia) Zvezda Zvenigorod	32–24	35–31
Viborg HK (Denmark)	81–50	(Hungary) Debreceni VSC	42–25	39–25

=== Matches ===
==== First leg ====
4 March 2012; 18:00	Byåsen HE (Norway)	28 – 29	(Germany) HC Leipzig	Trondheim Spektrum, Trondheim; Attendance: 750; Referees: Rakytina, Tkachuk (Ukraine)
4 March 2012; 18:00	Alstad 11	(18–19)	Lang 6	Trondheim Spektrum, Trondheim; Attendance: 750; Referees: Rakytina, Tkachuk (Ukraine)
4 March 2012; 18:00	3× (yellow card) 3× (suspension)	(Report)	3× (yellow card) 3× (suspension)	Trondheim Spektrum, Trondheim; Attendance: 750; Referees: Rakytina, Tkachuk (Ukraine)

3 March 2012; 19:00	RK Zaječar (Serbia)	28 – 31	(Russia) HC Dinamo Volgograd	Src Kraljevica, Zaječar; Attendance: 2,300; Referees: Katsikis, Michailidis (Greece)
3 March 2012; 19:00	Mangue 7	(15–15)	Borshchenko 12	Src Kraljevica, Zaječar; Attendance: 2,300; Referees: Katsikis, Michailidis (Greece)
3 March 2012; 19:00	3× (yellow card) 4× (suspension)	(Report)	3× (yellow card) 4× (suspension)	Src Kraljevica, Zaječar; Attendance: 2,300; Referees: Katsikis, Michailidis (Greece)

3 March 2012; 20:00	Ferencvárosi TC (Hungary)	32 – 24	(Russia) Zvezda Zvenigorod	Főtáv-FTC Aréna, Budapest; Attendance: 1,200; Referees: Kavulic, Skruzny (Czech Republic)
3 March 2012; 20:00	Kovacsicz 6	(21–11)	Postnova 6	Főtáv-FTC Aréna, Budapest; Attendance: 1,200; Referees: Kavulic, Skruzny (Czech Republic)
3 March 2012; 20:00	2× (yellow card) 5× (suspension)	(Report)	2× (yellow card) 2× (suspension)	Főtáv-FTC Aréna, Budapest; Attendance: 1,200; Referees: Kavulic, Skruzny (Czech Republic)

4 March 2012; 15:00	Viborg HK (Denmark)	42 – 25	(Hungary) Debreceni VSC	Viborg Stadionhal, Viborg; Attendance: 2,500; Referees: Schaller, Wutzler (Germany)
4 March 2012; 15:00	Jurack 8	(19–13)	Kudor 4	Viborg Stadionhal, Viborg; Attendance: 2,500; Referees: Schaller, Wutzler (Germany)
4 March 2012; 15:00	2× (yellow card) 1× (suspension)	(Report)	3× (yellow card) 7× (suspension)	Viborg Stadionhal, Viborg; Attendance: 2,500; Referees: Schaller, Wutzler (Germany)

==== Second leg ====
12 March 2012; 19:30	HC Leipzig (Germany)	26 – 20	(Norway) Byåsen HE	Arena Leipzig, Leipzig; Attendance: 3,350; Referees: Crnojevic, Kostecki Radic (Croatia)
12 March 2012; 19:30	Visser 7	(15–11)	Herrem, Nøstvold 4	Arena Leipzig, Leipzig; Attendance: 3,350; Referees: Crnojevic, Kostecki Radic (Croatia)
12 March 2012; 19:30	2× (yellow card) 3× (suspension)	(Report)	3× (yellow card)	Arena Leipzig, Leipzig; Attendance: 3,350; Referees: Crnojevic, Kostecki Radic (Croatia)

10 March 2012; 14:00	HC Dinamo Volgograd (Russia)	32 – 26	(Serbia) RK Zaječar	Sports Hall Dinamo, Volgograd; Attendance: 1,500; Referees: Brehmer, Skowronek (Poland)
10 March 2012; 14:00	Borshchenko 6	(13–11)	Peraica 8	Sports Hall Dinamo, Volgograd; Attendance: 1,500; Referees: Brehmer, Skowronek (Poland)
10 March 2012; 14:00	2× (yellow card) 6× (suspension)	(Report)	3× (yellow card) 6× (suspension)	Sports Hall Dinamo, Volgograd; Attendance: 1,500; Referees: Brehmer, Skowronek (Poland)

3 March 2012; 20:00	Zvezda Zvenigorod (Russia)	31 – 35	(Hungary) Ferencvárosi TC	Sport Hall Zvezda, Zvenigorod; Attendance: 900; Referees: Mandak, Rudinsky (Slovakia)
3 March 2012; 20:00	four players 6	(14–15)	Szucsánszki 6	Sport Hall Zvezda, Zvenigorod; Attendance: 900; Referees: Mandak, Rudinsky (Slovakia)
3 March 2012; 20:00	3× (yellow card) 3× (suspension)	(Report)	3× (yellow card) 5× (suspension)	Sport Hall Zvezda, Zvenigorod; Attendance: 900; Referees: Mandak, Rudinsky (Slovakia)

11 March 2012; 16:00	Debreceni VSC (Hungary)	25 – 39	(Denmark) Viborg HK	Hódos Imre Sportcsarnok, Debrecen; Attendance: 1,000; Referees: Leczczynski, Piechota (Poland)
11 March 2012; 16:00	three players 4	(11–12)	Althaus 10	Hódos Imre Sportcsarnok, Debrecen; Attendance: 1,000; Referees: Leczczynski, Piechota (Poland)
11 March 2012; 16:00	3× (yellow card) 5× (suspension)	(Report)	2× (yellow card) 4× (suspension)	Hódos Imre Sportcsarnok, Debrecen; Attendance: 1,000; Referees: Leczczynski, Piechota (Poland)

== Semifinals ==
=== Matches ===
Team 1	Agg.	Team 2	1st leg	2nd leg
Ferencvárosi TC (Hungary)	69–64	(Russia) HC Dinamo Volgograd	34–26	35–38
HC Leipzig (Germany)	57–62	(Denmark) Viborg HK	30–29	27–33

==== First leg ====
31 March 2012; 20:00	Ferencvárosi TC (Hungary)	34 – 26	(Russia) HC Dinamo Volgograd	Dabas-Diego Sportcsarnok, Dabas; Attendance: 2,500; Referees: Hakansson, Nilsson (Sweden)
31 March 2012; 20:00	Tomori, Zácsik 8	(20–8)	Kochetova, Levina 8	Dabas-Diego Sportcsarnok, Dabas; Attendance: 2,500; Referees: Hakansson, Nilsson (Sweden)
31 March 2012; 20:00	3× (yellow card) 4× (suspension)	(Report)	2× (yellow card) 4× (suspension)	Dabas-Diego Sportcsarnok, Dabas; Attendance: 2,500; Referees: Hakansson, Nilsson (Sweden)

1 April 2012; 15:30	HC Leipzig (Germany)	30 – 29	(Denmark) Viborg HK	Arena Leipzig, Leipzig; Attendance: 5,000; Referees: Pavel, State (Romania)
1 April 2012; 15:30	Müller 8	(14–15)	Gulldén 9	Arena Leipzig, Leipzig; Attendance: 5,000; Referees: Pavel, State (Romania)
1 April 2012; 15:30	3× (yellow card) 2× (suspension)	(Report)	3× (yellow card) 1× (suspension)	Arena Leipzig, Leipzig; Attendance: 5,000; Referees: Pavel, State (Romania)

==== Second leg ====
7 April 2012; 14:00	HC Dinamo Volgograd (Russia)	38 – 35	(Hungary) Ferencvárosi TC	Sports Hall Dinamo, Volgograd; Attendance: 1,500; Referees: Leandersson, Lindroos (Finland)
7 April 2012; 14:00	Borshchenko, Kochetova 9	(17–18)	Szucsánszki 9	Sports Hall Dinamo, Volgograd; Attendance: 1,500; Referees: Leandersson, Lindroos (Finland)
7 April 2012; 14:00	3× (yellow card) 4× (suspension) 1× (red card)	(Report)	3× (yellow card) 5× (suspension)	Sports Hall Dinamo, Volgograd; Attendance: 1,500; Referees: Leandersson, Lindroos (Finland)

9 April 2012; 16:50	Viborg HK (Denmark)	33 – 27	(Germany) HC Leipzig	Viborg Stadionhal, Viborg; Attendance: 1,750; Referees: Malasinskas, Grigalionis (Lithuania)
9 April 2012; 16:50	Ahlm 7	(14–11)	Kudłacz, Augsburg 5	Viborg Stadionhal, Viborg; Attendance: 1,750; Referees: Malasinskas, Grigalionis (Lithuania)
9 April 2012; 16:50	3× (yellow card) 1× (suspension)	(Report)	3× (yellow card) 2× (suspension)	Viborg Stadionhal, Viborg; Attendance: 1,750; Referees: Malasinskas, Grigalionis (Lithuania)

== Final ==
=== Matches ===
Team 1	Agg.	Team 2	1st leg	2nd leg
Ferencvárosi TC (Hungary)	62–60	(Denmark) Viborg HK	31–30	31–30

==== First leg ====
7 May 2012; 18:30	Ferencvárosi TC (Hungary)	31 – 30	(Denmark) Viborg HK	OBO Aréna, Dabas; Attendance: 2,500; Referees: Brehmer, Skowronek (Poland)
7 May 2012; 18:30	Szucsánszki, Tomori 6	(14–12)	Skov 8	OBO Aréna, Dabas; Attendance: 2,500; Referees: Brehmer, Skowronek (Poland)
7 May 2012; 18:30	4× (yellow card) 5× (suspension)	(Report)	3× (yellow card) 3× (suspension)	OBO Aréna, Dabas; Attendance: 2,500; Referees: Brehmer, Skowronek (Poland)

==== Second leg ====
13 May 2012; 16:45	Viborg HK (Denmark)	30 – 31	(Hungary) Ferencvárosi TC	Viborg Stadionhal, Viborg; Attendance: 2,500; Referees: Bonaventura, Bonaventura (France)
13 May 2012; 16:45	Skov 10	(12–15)	Kovacsicz, Szucsánszki 6	Viborg Stadionhal, Viborg; Attendance: 2,500; Referees: Bonaventura, Bonaventura (France)
13 May 2012; 16:45	3× (yellow card) 4× (suspension)	(Report)	3× (yellow card) 3× (suspension)	Viborg Stadionhal, Viborg; Attendance: 2,500; Referees: Bonaventura, Bonaventura (France)

EHF Cup Winners' Cup
2011–12 Winners

Ferencvárosi TC
Third Title

== Top scorers ==
The top scorers from the 2011–12 EHF Cup Winners' Cup are as follows:

Rank	Name	Team	Goals
1	(Hungary) Mónika Kovacsicz	(Hungary) Ferencvárosi TC	65
2	(Hungary) Zita Szucsánszki	(Hungary) Ferencvárosi TC	62
3	(Hungary) Szandra Zácsik	(Hungary) Ferencvárosi TC	61
4	(Spain) Patricia Alonso Jiménez	(Spain) BM Mar Sagunto	51
5	(Hungary) Zsuzsanna Tomori	(Hungary) Ferencvárosi TC	47
6	(Serbia) Jelena Živković	(Hungary) Ferencvárosi TC	44
7	(Hungary) Tamara Tilinger	(Hungary) Alba Fehérvár KC	42
8	(Germany) Saskia Lang	(Germany) HC Leipzig	40
8	(Germany) Nathalie Augsburg	(Germany) HC Leipzig	40
8	(Russia) Kristina Trishchuk	(Hungary) Alba Fehérvár KC	40
8	(Russia) Liudmila Postnova	(Russia) Zvezda Zvenigorod	40
