= Andrea Klikovac =

Montenegrin handball player (born 1991)

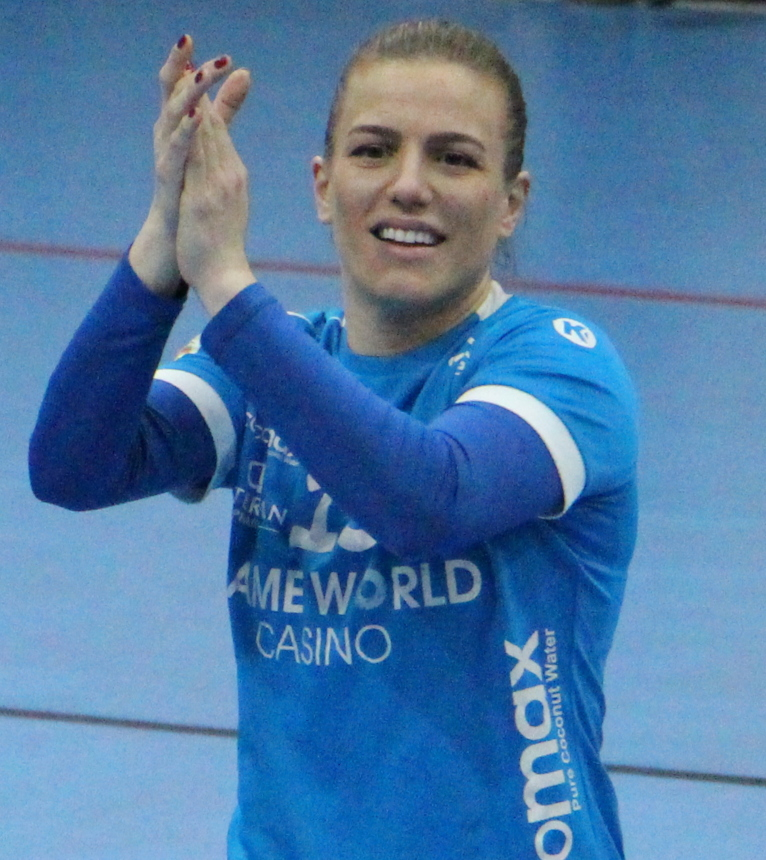

Personal information
- Nationality: Montenegrin
- Born: 5 May 1991 (age 35) Titograd, SR Montenegro, SFR Yugoslavia
- Height: 1.74 m (5 ft 9 in)

Sport
- Sport: Handball
- Position: Right back
- Current club: CSM București
- Number: 15

Senior clubs
- Years: Team
- 2000–2009: "Petrol Bonus" Podgorica
- 2009–2011: ŽRK Biseri
- 2011–2012: RK Žito Prilep
- 2012–2018: HC Vardar
- 2018–2019: Kisvárdai KC
- 2019–2023: CSM București
National team
Years	Team	Apps	(Gls)
2011–2021	Montenegro	93	(60)
Medal record
European Championship
Gold medal – first place	2012 Serbia
Junior World Championship
Bronze medal – third place	2010 South Korea

Andrea Klikovac (born 5 May 1991) is a Montenegrin handball player for CSM București and the Montenegrin national team. She is a defence specialist.

She was part of the Montenegrin team that won their first ever international title at the 2012 European Women's Handball Championship.

== International honours ==
- EHF Champions League:
  - Finalist: 2017, 2018
  - Third place: 2014, 2015, 2016
