= Isabel Ortuño =

Spanish handball player (born 1982)

Personal information
- Full name: Isabel María Ortuño Torrico
- Nationality: Spanish
- Born: 16 March 1982 (age 44) Elda, Spain
- Height: 1.77 m (5 ft 10 in)

Sport
- Sport: Handball
- Position: Right Back

Senior clubs
- Years: Team
- –2004: BM Elda Prestigio
- 2004–2007: Viborg HK
- 2007–2008: BM Sagunto
- 2008–2012: CB Mar Alicante
National team
Years	Team	Apps	(Gls)
2000-2010	Spain	103	(288)
Medal record
Mediterranean Games
Gold medal – first place	2005 Almería	Team

Isabel María Ortuño Torrico (born 16 March 1982) is a Spanish former handballer, who has been capped for the Spanish national team.

== Early life and career ==
Ortuño was born in Elda, Spain, and competed in the 2004 Olympic Games in Athens, where she finished sixth with the Spanish women's handball team, after losing 29–38 to Hungary in the placement match.

== Awards and recognition ==
- EHF Cup Winners' Cup Top Scorer: 2011

Preceded by (Serbia) Katarina Bulatović	EHF Cup Winners' Cup top scorer 2010–11	Succeeded by (Hungary) Mónika Kovacsicz
