= Mónika Kovacsicz =

Hungarian handball player (born 1983)

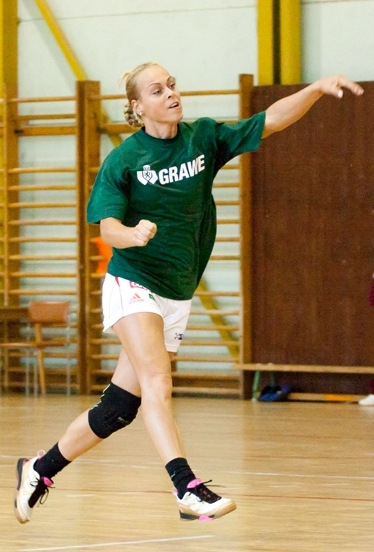
- Kovacsicz in 2011

Personal information
- Nationality: Hungarian
- Born: 20 November 1983 (age 42) Komárno, Czechoslovakia
- Height: 170 cm (5 ft 7 in)

Sport
- Sport: Handball
- Position: Right Wing

Senior clubs
- Years: Team
- 2000–2003: Békéscsabai Előre NKSE
- 2003–2007: Győri ETO KC
- 2007–2008: Ferencvárosi TC
- 2008–2010: Viborg HK
- 2010–2016: Ferencvárosi TC
- 2017–2018: Szent István SE
- 2018–2019: Mosonmagyaróvári KC SE
National team
Years	Team	Apps	(Gls)
2005–2015	Hungary	155	(351)
Medal record
World Championship
Bronze medal – third place	2005 Russia
European Championship
Bronze medal – third place	2012 Serbia

Mónika Kovacsicz (formerly Monika Kovačičová; born 20 November 1983) is a retired Hungarian handballer of Slovak descent.

Her first major international tournament was the 2005 World Championship, where she finished third with the Hungarian team. She was at another World Championship (2007) and took part in three European Championships (2006, 2008, 2010). She also competed at the 2008 Summer Olympics in Beijing, capturing a fourth place.

Kovacsicz won the Champions League with Viborg in 2009.

== Achievements ==
- Nemzeti Bajnokág I:
  - Winner: 2005, 2006, 2015
  - Silver Medalist: 2004, 2007, 2012, 2013, 2014, 2016
  - Bronze Medalist: 2008, 2011
- Nemzeti Bajnokság I/B:
  - Winner: 2018
- Magyar Kupa:
  - Winner: 2005, 2006, 2007
- Damehåndboldligaen:
  - Winner: 2009
- Landspokalturnering:
  - Winner: 2008
- EHF Champions League:
  - Winner: 2009, 2010
- EHF Cup:
  - Finalist: 2004, 2005
- EHF Cup Winners' Cup:
  - Winner: 2011, 2012
  - Finalist: 2006
- World Championship:
  - Bronze Medalist: 2005
- European Championship:
  - Bronze Medalist: 2012

== Individual awards ==
- EHF Cup Winners' Cup Top Scorer: 2012

== Personal life ==
Her cousin, Szandra Zácsik, is a professional handball player and a Hungarian international.

Awards
Preceded by (Spain) Isabel Ortuño	EHF Cup Winners' Cup top scorer 2011–12	Succeeded by (Ukraine) Regina Shymkute
