= Sabina Jacobsen =

Swedish handball player (born 1989)

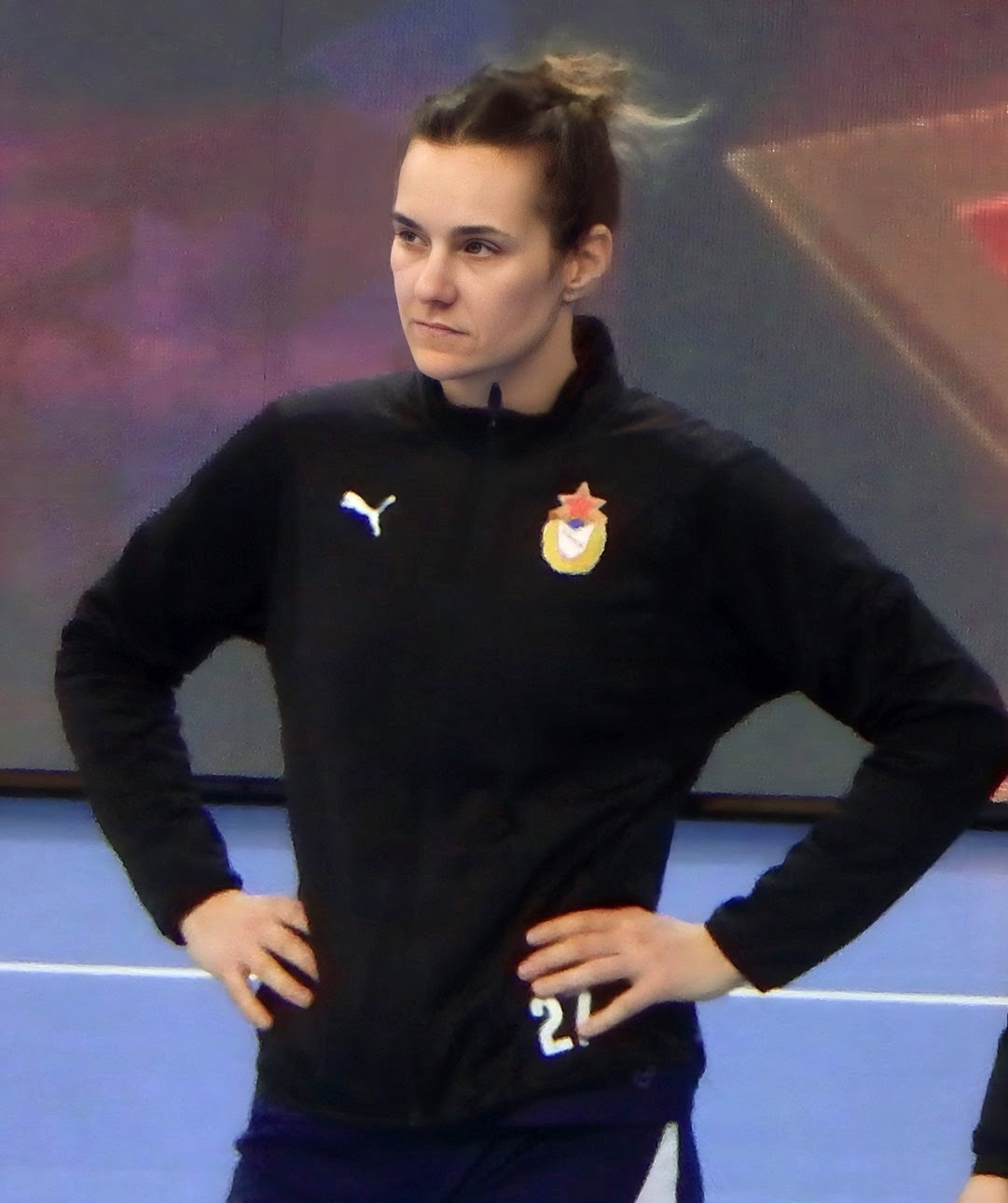
- Jacobsen in 2021 (with CSKA Moscow)

Personal information
- Full name: Sabina Rosengren Jacobsen
- Nationality: Swedish
- Born: 24 March 1989 (age 37) Lund, Sweden
- Height: 1.80 m (5 ft 11 in)

Sport
- Sport: Handball
- Position: Defender/Left back

Senior clubs
- Years: Team
- 2006–2012: Lugi HF
- 2012–2014: Randers HK
- 2014–2017: Midtjylland Håndbold
- 2017–2019: CSM București
- 2019–2021: CSKA Moscow
- 2021–2022: Dunărea Brăila
- 2022: Rocasa Gran Canaria
- 2022–2025: Lugi HF
National team
Years	Team	Apps	(Gls)
2007–2019	Sweden	136	(134)
Medal record
European Championship
Silver medal – second place	2010 Denmark/Norway
Bronze medal – third place	2014 Croatia/Hungary

Sabina Rosengren Jacobsen (born 24 March 1989) is a Swedish retired handball player who last played for Lugi HF and the Swedish national team.

== International honours ==
- EHF Champions League:
  - Bronze Medalist: 2018
- Cup Winners' Cup:
  - Winner: 2015
- European Championship:
  - Silver Medalist: 2010
  - Bronze Medalist: 2014
- Carpathian Trophy:
  - Winner: 2015

== Individual awards ==
- European Championship Best Defensive Player: 2014
- Swedish Elitserien Top Scorer: 2007, 2008, 2009
- Swedish Female Handballer of the Year: 2013
