= RK Žito Prilep =

Macedonian handball club

РК Жито Прилеп WHC Prilep
- Full name: Rakometen klub Žito Prilep
- Founded: 1979
- Arena: Sportska Arena SONCE, Prilep
- Capacity: 1,500
- Head coach: Borče Markovski
- League: Skopsko Super League
- 2010–11: 2nd
- Club colours
Home	Away

RK Žito Prilep (HC Žito Prilep) (Macedonian: РК Жито Прилеп) is a Macedonian women's handball club from Prilep, North Macedonia. The team competes in the Macedonian women's First League of Handball.

== History ==
The club was founded in 1979. It has played in the Women's EHF Challenge Cup twice, reaching the Quarterfinals in the 2010–11 season. In the following season, they barely missed Round 3 in the 2011–12 Women's EHF Cup Winners' Cup, losing to HC Veselí nad Moravou on away goals.

== Domestic Achievements (North Macedonia) ==
- Champions

1988

== Arena ==
Sportska arena SONCE is the home of Žito Prilep. It has a capacity of 1,500 and was built in 1975. In 2011, it was completely renovated by the club which now owns the arena.

== Current squad 2011/2012 ==
- (North Macedonia) Sandra Durlanova (Goalkeeper)
- (Romania) Mihaela Ialomiteanu (Goalkeeper)
- (North Macedonia) Dijana Naumoska (Goalkeeper)
- (North Macedonia) Sofija Adjuleska
- (North Macedonia) Sara Caneska
- (North Macedonia) Jovanka Cvetanovska
- (North Macedonia) Kristina Ilieska
- (Montenegro) Andrea Klikovac
- (North Macedonia) Marija Kogoj
- (Montenegro) Danijela Matanovic
- (North Macedonia) Slavica Mrkich
- (North Macedonia) Biljana Pavicevic
- (North Macedonia) Ivana Petkovska
- (North Macedonia) Marija Petleska
- (North Macedonia) Marija Serafimovska
- (North Macedonia) Marija Steriova
- (Montenegro) Ana Stojanovic
- (Montenegro) Tamara Stojanovic
