= Natalie Augsburg =

German handball player (born 1983)

Personal information
- Nationality: German
- Born: 15 November 1983 (age 42) Krapkowice, Poland
- Height: 1.75 m (5 ft 9 in)

Sport
- Sport: Handball
- Position: Left wing
- Current club: Spreefüxxe Berlin
- Number: 7

Senior clubs
- Years: Team
- –2001: Rastatter TV
- 2001–2007: TSG Ketsch
- 2007–2013: HC Leipzig
- 2013–2015: Spreefüxxe Berlin
National team
| Years | Team | Apps | (Gls) |
| 2010–2015 | Germany | 78 | (129) |

Natalie Augsburg (born 15 November 1983) is a German former handball player. She played on the German national team, and participated at the 2011 World Women's Handball Championship in Brazil.

She retired in 2015 playing for Füchse Berlin.
