= Ana de Sousa =

Portuguese archer (born 1969)

Personal information
- Nationality: Portuguese
- Born: 18 August 1969 (age 56) Lisbon, Portugal

Sport
- Sport: Archery

Ana de Sousa (born 18 August 1969) is a Portuguese archer. She competed at the 1988 Summer Olympics and the 1992 Summer Olympics.
