= Stella Sigurðardóttir =

Icelandic handball player (born 1990)

Personal information
- Nationality: Icelandic
- Born: 30 March 1990 (age 36) Reykjavík, Iceland
- Height: 1.81 m (5 ft 11 in)

Sport
- Sport: Handball
- Position: Left back

Senior clubs
- Years: Team
- 2005-2013: Fram Reykjavík
- 2013-2014: SønderjyskE Håndbold
- 2021-2022: Fram Reykjavík
National team
Years	Team	Apps	(Gls)
2008-2014	Iceland	72	(205)
- Updated on 25 February 2018

Stella Sigurðardóttir (born 30 March 1990) is an Icelandic former team handball player. She played on the Icelandic national team, and participated at the 2011 World Women's Handball Championship in Brazil.

== Career ==
Sigurðardóttir started playing handball at Fram Reykjavík where she would make her senior debut in the 2005–06 season

Having previously played for the Icelandic youth national teams, she debuted for the national team in March 2008.

In 2010 she won the Icelandic Cup with Fram and in 2013 the Icelandic championship, the first championship for the club in 23 years.

In the 2010 Úrvalsdeild kvenna playoffs, Stella suffered a blow to her temple and was knocked out. In November 2013, Stella suffered a blow to her left temple, in a game with the national team, that resulted in a concussion, memory loss and a temporary loss of sight in her left eye. In January 2014, in a game with SönderjyskE she suffered another blow to the head that worsened the symptoms and she retired afterwards.

In January 2021 she returned to handball and signed a contract with Fram. In 2022 she won the second national title with the team, and retired afterwards.

== Trophies ==
- Icelandic Champions:
  - 2013, 2022
- Icelandic Cup:
  - 2010, 2011
- League champions:
  - 2022
- Icelandic League Cup:
  - 2010, 2013
