= Andrea Šerić =

Croatian handball player (born 1985)

Personal information
- Nationality: Croatian
- Born: 3 August 1985 (age 41) Split, SR Croatia, SFR Yugoslavia
- Height: 1.84 m (6 ft 0 in)

Sport
- Sport: Handball
- Position: Line Player

Senior clubs
- Years: Team
- 2001-2005: ŽRK Split
- 2005-2010: Podravka Koprivnica
- 2010-2011: Lokomotiva Zagreb
- 2011-2012: RK Krim
- 2012-2013: Siófok KC
- 2013-2015: RK Zelina
- 2015-2016: Zağnos SK
- 2016-2018: Kastamonu Bld. GSK
- 2018-2019: SCM Craiova
- 2019-2020: Kastamonu Bld. GSK
National team
- Years: Team
- –: Croatia

Andrea Šerić (born 3 August 1985) is a former Croatian female handballer who played as a line player for Turkish Super League club Kastamonu Bld. GSK and the Croatia national team.

== International honours ==
- EHF Cup:
  - Finalist: 2006
  - Semifinalist: 2017–18
