= Vera Lopes =

Portuguese handball player (born 1982)

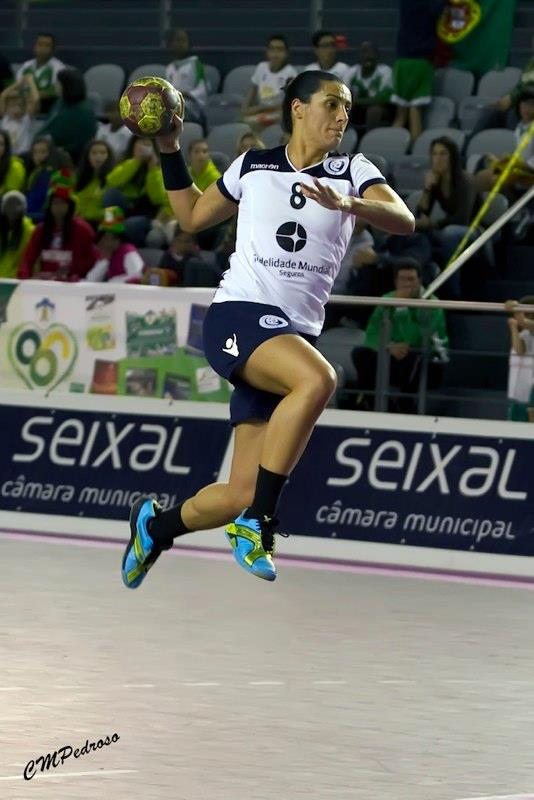
- European qualification for the World Championship in Servia 2013

Personal information
- Full name: Vera do Carmo Andrade Lopes
- Nationality: Portuguese
- Born: 1 April 1982 (age 44) Oeiras, Portugal
- Height: 1.70 m (5 ft 7 in)

Sport
- Sport: Handball
- Position: Left Back

Senior clubs
- Years: Team
- –2005: SIM Porto Salvo
- 2005–2012: CDES Gil Eanes
- 2012–2013: SD Itxako
- 2013-2016: ÍBV
National team
Years	Team	Apps	(Gls)
–	Portugal	89	(137)
- Updated on 17 August 2026

Vera do Carmo Andrade Lopes (born 1 April 1982) is a former Portuguese handball player who was member of the Portugal women's national handball team.

== International career ==
She competed at the 2008 European Women's Handball Championship that was held in the Republic of Macedonia from 2–14 December, where the Portuguese team qualified in 16th place.

== Achievements ==
- 1ª Divisão de Andebol Feminino:
  - Winner: 2010, 2011

== Individual awards ==
- Best Player 1ª Divisão de Andebol Feminino: 2010/2011
