= Iaroslava Burlachenko =

Ukrainian handball player (born 1992)

Yaroslava Burlachenko
Personal information
- Full name: Yaroslava Burlachenko
- Nationality: Ukrainian; Romanian
- Born: 14 May 1992 (age 34) Kyiv, Ukraine
- Height: 1.79 m (5 ft 10 in)

Sport
- Sport: Handball
- Position: Pivot
- Current club: CS Gloria Bistrița-Năsăud (handball)
- Number: 3

Senior clubs
- Years: Team
- 2008–2012: Podatkova University
- 2012–2013: HC Danubius Galați
- 2013-2014: Cankaya Belediyesi Ankara
- 2014–2016: Ardeşen GSK
- 2016-2017: SCM Craiova
- 2017-2018: HCM Slobozia
- 2018-2022: CS Minaur Baia Mare
- 2022-2024: SCM Gloria Buzău
- 2024-: CS Gloria Bistrița-Năsăud (handball)
National team
- Years: Team
- –: Ukraine
- –: Romania
- Updated on 13 January 2025

Yaroslava Burlachenko (born 14 May 1992) is a Ukrainian female handballer who plays for CS Gloria Bistrița-Năsăud (handball) and the Romanian national team. She also holds Romanian citizenship.
