= Karolina Semeniuk-Olchawa =

Polish handball player (born 1983)

Personal information
- Nationality: Polish
- Born: 24 October 1983 (age 42) Żory, Poland
- Height: 1.74 m (5 ft 9 in)

Sport
- Sport: Handball
- Position: Central back
- Current club: MKS Zagłębie Lubin
- Number: 9
National team
Years	Team	Apps	(Gls)
–	Poland	27	(66)

Karolina Semeniuk-Olchawa (born 24 October 1983) is a Polish handball player. She plays for the club MKS Zagłębie Lubin, the Polish national team and represented Poland at the 2013 World Women's Handball Championship in Serbia.
