= Saskia Lang =

German handball player (born 1986)

Personal information
- Nationality: German / Swiss
- Born: 19 December 1986 (age 39) Lörrach, Germany
- Height: 1.78 m (5 ft 10 in)

Sport
- Sport: Handball
- Position: Left back
- Current club: HC Leipzig
- Number: 18

Senior clubs
- Years: Team
- 1997–: TV Grenzach
- –2003: ATV Basel
- 2003–2009: LC Brühl St. Gallen
- 2009–2011: HSG Blomberg-Lippe
- 2011–2017: HC Leipzig
- 2017-2020: Thüringer HC
National team
| Years | Team | Apps | (Gls) |
| 2010–2020 | Germany | 77 | (91) |

Saskia Lang (born 19 December 1986) is a German former handball player for Thüringer HC and the German national team.

In April 2017 she was tested positive for higenamine, which is on the WADA prohibited list, was detected in a blood and urine sample. In October 2017 it was determined that there was no intention of doping, and therefore she was suspended for only a month.
