= Szandra Szöllősi-Zácsik =

Hungarian handball player (born 1990)

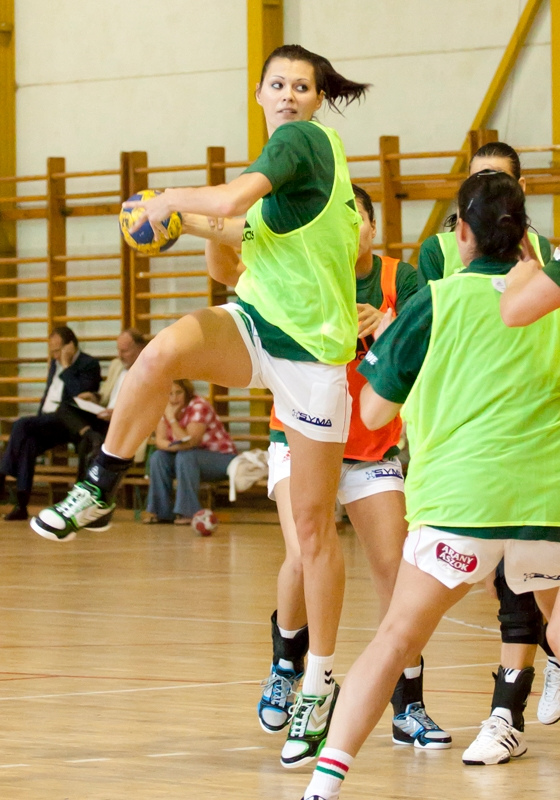
- Zácsik in 2011

Personal information
- Full name: Szandra Szöllősi-Zácsik
- Nationality: Hungarian
- Born: 22 April 1990 (age 36) Komárno, Czechoslovakia
- Height: 1.85 m (6 ft 1 in)

Sport
- Sport: Handball
- Position: Left back
- Current club: Esztergomi KC

Senior clubs
- Years: Team
- 2004–2006: Váci NKSE
- 2006–2009: Ferencvárosi TC
- 2009–2010: RK Krim
- 2010–2017: Ferencvárosi TC
- 2017–2019: Budaörs Handball
- 2019–2021: MTK Budapest
- 2021–2025: Ferencvárosi TC
- 2025–: Esztergomi KC
National team
Years	Team	Apps	(Gls)
2009–	Hungary	89	(291)
Medal record
Junior European Championship
Silver medal – second place	2009 Hungary

Szandra Szöllősi-Zácsik (born 22 April 1990) is a Hungarian handballer for Esztergomi KC and the Hungarian national team.

== Career ==
=== Club ===
Born in Komárno into an ethnic Hungarian family, Zácsik made her senior debut for Váci NKSE at the age of 14. Her talent was spotted early and was traced by both Győri ETO KC and Ferencvárosi TC. Finally, in 2006, Ferencváros secured her services. During her spell at the club she won all color of medals in the Hungarian championship and added a Hungarian cup silver to her success list as well.

In 2009, she moved to Slovenian EHF Champions League outfit RK Krim, but her recurrent shoulder injury hampered her to settle in the area, and on 27 April 2010 it was reported that she is leaving Krim and going to re-join Ferencváros in summer 2011.

However, the transfer move was realized earlier than expected, as Zácsik have been released by Krim on 22 December 2010, making her able to join her former team immediately.

Ferencváros called a press conference on 27 December 2010, where it was announced that they have agreed with Zácsik and have signed a contract which will keep the left back by the club until 30 June 2013.

Zácsik immediately found herself in the starting lineup and played a pivotal role in the club's EHF Cup Winners' Cup triumph in 2011. She first found herself in the limelight against past year EHF Champions League winners Viborg HK: with only a few seconds left and trailing by one on aggregate goals, she hit a penalty shot, giving a dramatic and unexpected victory over their highly rated rivals on away goals.

In the following round she helped her team with sixteen goals to knock out Toulon St-Cyr Var Handball, that was eliminated during the Group phase of the EHF Champions League and continued their European adventure in the EHF Cup Winners' Cup. After beating Metz Handball in a close encounter, Ferencváros played the finals against CB Mar Alicante. This time Zácsik did not contribute to the success with number of goals, but with a clever team play. She got a tight man marking, making her unable to get into shooting position. However, by dividing the attention of the defenders, she created space for her teammates to score goals easier. Ferencváros eventually went to win the trophy and Zácsik ended the competition with 49 goals on eight matches.

=== International ===
Zácsik have won the silver medal on the Junior European Championship on home soil, and also debuted in the senior team on 22 September 2009 against Germany.

== Personal ==
Her cousin, Mónika Kovacsicz, is a retired professional handball player, having represented the Hungarian national team on a number of international tournaments. She is married to handball player Szabolcs Szöllősi. They have two children. Their daughter, Hanna was born in March 2015, and their son, Borisz was born in April 2019.

== Achievements ==
- Nemzeti Bajnokság I:
  - Winner: 2007
- Magyar Kupa:
  - Winner: 2017, 2022, 2023, 2024, 2025
  - Silver Medalist: 2007
- Slovenian Championship:
  - Winner: 2010
- Slovenian Cup:
  - Winner: 2010
- EHF Cup Winners' Cup:
  - Winner: 2011, 2012
  - Semifinalist: 2007
- EHF Champions Trophy:
  - Fourth Placed: 2006
- Junior European Championship:
  - Silver Medalist: 2009

== Individual awards ==
- All-Star Left Back of the Junior European Championship: 2009
