= Handball at the 2020 Summer Olympics – Women's team rosters =

This article shows the rosters of all participating teams at the women's handball tournament at the 2020 Summer Olympics in Tokyo.

Each roster consists of 15 players, where 14 can be chosen for each match. The players can be changed without restrictions.

Age, clubs, caps and goals as of the start of the tournament, 25 July 2021.

== Group A ==
=== Angola ===
The squad was announced on 9 July 2021.

Head coach: Filipe Cruz

No.	Pos.	Name	Date of birth (age)	Height	App.	Goals	Club
5	LW	Marilia Quizelete	3 June 1997 (aged 24)	1.68 m	5	7	(Angola) Petro de Luanda
8	CB	Helena Paulo	24 January 1998 (aged 23)	1.77 m	34	159	(Angola) Primeiro de Agosto
9	CB	Natália Bernardo	25 December 1986 (aged 34)	1.70 m	118	214	(Angola) Primeiro de Agosto
10	P	Albertina Kassoma	12 June 1996 (aged 25)	1.94 m	76	181	(Romania) Rapid București
12	GK	Helena Sousa	7 November 1994 (aged 26)	1.90 m	38	1	(France) Saint-Amand Handball
13	RW	Natália Kamalandua	25 December 1998 (aged 22)	1.63 m	5	6	(Angola) Petro de Luanda
15	RB	Azenaide Carlos	14 June 1990 (aged 31)	1.71 m	91	112	(Croatia) RK Podravka Koprivnica
16	GK	Teresa Almeida	5 April 1988 (aged 33)	1.84 m	104	0	(Angola) Petro de Luanda
17	RB	Wuta Dombaxe	5 April 1986 (aged 35)	1.81 m	79	62	(Angola) Primeiro de Agosto
20	LB	Stélvia Pascoal	20 October 2002 (aged 18)	1.76 m	5	2	(Angola) Petro de Luanda
21	LB	Magda Cazanga	28 May 1991 (aged 30)	1.77 m	49	84	(Angola) Petro de Luanda
23	RW	Juliana Machado	6 November 1994 (aged 26)	1.70 m	62	1115	(Angola) Primeiro de Agosto
25	P	Liliana Venâncio	19 September 1995 (aged 25)	1.91 m	37	44	(Angola) Primeiro de Agosto
90	CB	Isabel Guialo	8 April 1990 (aged 31)	1.80 m	79	235	(France) Fleury Loiret HB

=== Japan ===
The squad was announced on 28 June 2021. On 30 July, Kaho Sunami was replaced by Mana Horikawa.

Head coach: (Denmark) Ulrik Kirkely

No.	Pos.	Name	Date of birth (age)	Height	App.	Goals	Club
3	P	Kaho Sunami	5 January 1993 (aged 28)	1.66 m	45	74	(Japan) Sony Semiconductor
4	RB	Yui Sunami	7 June 1991 (aged 30)	1.62 m	59	160	(Japan) Hokkoku Bank
5	LB	Sayo Shiota	21 March 1989 (aged 32)	1.72 m	66	62	(Japan) Hokkoku Bank
9	CB	Aya Yokoshima	3 July 1990 (aged 31)	1.62 m	55	160	(Japan) Hokkoku Bank
11	P	Mana Horikawa	4 March 1994 (aged 27)	1.74 m	17	2	(Japan) lzumi Maple Reds
12	GK	Minami Itano	2 February 1993 (aged 28)	1.74 m	26	1	(Japan) lzumi Maple Reds
18	LW	Yuki Tanabe	25 August 1989 (aged 31)	1.70 m	59	196	(Germany) Thüringer HC
21	RW	Ayaka Ikehara	24 September 1990 (aged 30)	1.58 m	43	101	(Denmark) Odense Håndbold
24	LB	Nozomi Hara	9 March 1991 (aged 30)	1.70 m	78	224	(Japan) MIE violet' IRIS
25	CB	Mana Ohyama	7 December 1992 (aged 28)	1.65 m	45	105	(Japan) Hokkoku Bank
27	LB	Haruno Sasaki	26 February 1995 (aged 26)	1.72 m	23	80	(Japan) Hokkoku Bank
28	P	Shiori Nagata	24 October 1987 (aged 33)	1.71 m	109	92	(Japan) Omron
30	GK	Sakura Hauge	7 January 1987 (aged 34)	1.74 m	49	5	(France) ESBF Besançon
34	LW	Maharu Kondo	24 January 1996 (aged 25)	1.58 m	0	0	(Japan) lzumi Maple Reds
40	RB	Shio Fujii	27 March 1985 (aged 36)	1.64 m	121	613	(Japan) Osaka Lovvits
81	CB	Mayuko Ishitate	18 January 1987 (aged 34)	1.67 m	96	201	(Japan) MIE violet' IRIS

=== Montenegro ===
The squad was announced on 9 July 2021.

Head coach: Bojana Popović

No.	Pos.	Name	Date of birth (age)	Height	App.	Goals	Club
1	GK	Marina Rajčić	24 August 1993 (aged 27)	1.78 m	119	2	(Turkey) Kastamonu
4	RW	Jovanka Radičević	23 October 1986 (aged 34)	1.69 m	169	935	(Turkey) Kastamonu
9	LB	Đurđina Jauković	24 February 1997 (aged 24)	1.85 m	74	250	(France) Brest Bretagne
10	CB	Matea Pletikosić	24 April 1998 (aged 23)	1.69 m	10	5	(Slovenia) RK Krim
12	GK	Anastasija Babović	13 December 2000 (aged 20)	1.78 m	11	1	(Montenegro) ŽRK Budućnost
13	LW	Dijana Mugoša	22 October 1995 (aged 25)	1.67 m	24	12	(Croatia) RK Podravka
15	RB	Andrea Klikovac	5 May 1991 (aged 30)	1.75 m	87	54	(Romania) CSM București
16	GK	Ljubica Nenezić	15 January 1997 (aged 24)	1.79 m	37	0	(Romania) SCM Gloria Buzău
34	P	Tatjana Brnović	9 November 1998 (aged 22)	1.84 m	34	59	(Montenegro) ŽRK Budućnost
55	LW	Ivona Pavićević	21 April 1996 (aged 25)	1.67 m	42	23	(Montenegro) ŽRK Budućnost
66	P	Ema Ramusović	28 November 1996 (aged 24)	1.86 m	68	76	(Romania) CSM București
77	LW	Majda Mehmedović	25 May 1990 (aged 31)	1.69 m	128	347	(Turkey) Kastamonu
80	LB	Jelena Despotović	30 April 1994 (aged 27)	1.83 m	88	113	(Hungary) Győri Audi ETO KC
96	CB	Itana Grbić	1 September 1996 (aged 24)	1.69 m	59	72	(Montenegro) ŽRK Budućnost
97	P	Nikolina Vukčević	28 July 2000 (aged 20)	1.79 m	13	5	(Montenegro) ŽRK Budućnost

=== Netherlands ===
The squad was announced on 30 June 2021.

Head coach: (France) Emmanuel Mayonnade

No.	Pos.	Name	Date of birth (age)	Height	App.	Goals	Club
6	RB	Laura van der Heijden	27 June 1990 (aged 31)	1.72 m	222	683	(Germany) Borussia Dortmund
7	RW	Debbie Bont	9 December 1990 (aged 30)	1.75 m	177	348	(France) Metz Handball
8	LB	Lois Abbingh	13 August 1992 (aged 28)	1.77 m	161	724	(Denmark) Odense Håndbold
9	CB	Larissa Nüsser	8 February 2000 (aged 21)	1.75 m	37	40	(Denmark) København Håndbold
10	P	Danick Snelder	22 May 1990 (aged 31)	1.78 m	183	438	(Germany) SG BBM Bietigheim
12	LW	Bo van Wetering	10 May 1999 (aged 22)	1.72 m	24	57	(Denmark) Odense Håndbold
17	CB	Nycke Groot	4 May 1988 (aged 33)	1.75 m	141	439	Not attached
18	LB	Kelly Dulfer	21 March 1994 (aged 27)	1.85 m	124	152	(Germany) SG BBM Bietigheim
19	P	Merel Freriks	6 January 1998 (aged 23)	1.75 m	40	37	(Germany) Borussia Dortmund
20	LB	Inger Smits	17 September 1994 (aged 26)	1.79 m	38	30	(Germany) SG BBM Bietigheim
24	LW	Martine Smeets	5 May 1990 (aged 31)	1.72 m	117	144	(Romania) CSM București
26	RW	Angela Malestein	31 January 1993 (aged 28)	1.70 m	154	353	(Hungary) FTC Rail-Cargo Hungaria
30	GK	Rinka Duijndam	6 August 1997 (aged 23)	1.78 m	36	0	(Germany) Thüringer HC
33	GK	Tess Wester	19 May 1993 (aged 28)	1.78 m	116	10	(Romania) CSM București
48	RB	Dione Housheer	26 September 1999 (aged 21)	1.80 m	31	55	(Denmark) Odense Håndbold

=== Norway ===
The squad was announced on 3 July 2021.

Head coach: (Iceland) Thorir Hergeirsson

No.	Pos.	Name	Date of birth (age)	Height	App.	Goals	Club
2	CB	Henny Reistad	9 February 1999 (aged 22)	1.81 m	29	87	(Denmark) Team Esbjerg
4	LB	Veronica Kristiansen	10 July 1990 (aged 31)	1.75 m	145	475	(Hungary) Győri Audi ETO KC
5	P	Marit Malm Frafjord	25 November 1985 (aged 35)	1.82 m	214	411	(Denmark) Team Esbjerg
7	RB	Stine Skogrand	3 March 1993 (aged 28)	1.73 m	99	172	(Denmark) Herning-Ikast Håndbold
9	RB	Nora Mørk	5 April 1991 (aged 30)	1.67 m	133	644	(Norway) Vipers Kristiansand
10	CB	Stine Bredal Oftedal	25 September 1991 (aged 29)	1.68 m	204	558	(Hungary) Győri Audi ETO KC
12	GK	Silje Solberg	16 June 1990 (aged 31)	1.78 m	156	2	(Hungary) Győri Audi ETO KC
13	P	Kari Brattset Dale	15 February 1991 (aged 30)	1.83 m	80	188	(Hungary) Győri Audi ETO KC
16	GK	Katrine Lunde	30 March 1980 (aged 41)	1.80 m	308	3	(Norway) Vipers Kristiansand
20	RW	Marit Røsberg Jacobsen	25 February 1994 (aged 27)	1.65 m	74	130	(Denmark) Team Esbjerg
23	LW	Camilla Herrem	8 October 1986 (aged 34)	1.67 m	264	737	(Norway) Sola HK
24	LW	Sanna Solberg-Isaksen	16 June 1990 (aged 31)	1.78 m	161	288	(Denmark) Team Esbjerg
25	LB	Kristine Breistøl	23 August 1993 (aged 27)	1.92 m	19	12	(Denmark) Team Esbjerg
26	CB	Marta Tomac	20 September 1990 (aged 30)	1.79 m	78	73	(Norway) Vipers Kristiansand
34	P	Vilde Johansen	25 July 1994 (aged 27)	1.82 m	9	0	(Denmark) Herning-Ikast Håndbold

=== South Korea ===
The squad was announced on 14 June 2021.

Head coach: Kang Jae-won

No.	Pos.	Name	Date of birth (age)	Height	App.	Goals	Club
1	GK	Ju Hui	4 November 1989 (aged 31)	1.80 m	40	0	(South Korea) Busan
10	P	Won Seon-pil	6 August 1994 (aged 26)	1.74 m	5	14	(South Korea) Incheon
11	RB	Ryu Eun-hee	24 February 1990 (aged 31)	1.79 m	83	297	(Hungary) Győri Audi ETO KC
12	GK	Jeong Jin-hui	24 March 1999 (aged 22)	1.80 m	5	0	(South Korea) Korea National Sport University
13	RW	Kim Yun-ji	16 January 2000 (aged 21)	1.70 m	0	0	(South Korea) Samcheok
15	LW	Choi Su-min	9 January 1990 (aged 31)	1.77 m	49	155	(South Korea) SK Sugar Gliders
17	LB	Sim Hae-in	31 October 1987 (aged 33)	1.78 m	64	117	(South Korea) Busan
19	P	Kang Eun-hye	17 April 1996 (aged 25)	1.86 m	8	21	(South Korea) Busan
21	LW	Jo Ha-rang	15 July 1991 (aged 30)	1.65 m	9	67	(South Korea) Daegu
22	P	Gim Bo-eun	8 December 1997 (aged 23)	1.76 m	5	9	(South Korea) Samcheok
23	CB	Lee Mi-gyeong	2 October 1991 (aged 29)	1.70 m	43	65	(South Korea) Busan
24	CB	Kang Kyung-min	8 November 1996 (aged 24)	1.65 m	12	30	(South Korea) Gwangju
25	RB	Jung Yu-ra	6 February 1992 (aged 29)	1.70 m	23	37	(South Korea) Daegu
27	LB	Kim Jin-yi	20 June 1993 (aged 28)	1.80 m	50	115	(South Korea) Busan
34	RW	Jung Ji-in	18 July 2000 (aged 21)	1.80 m	5	13	(South Korea) Korea National Sport University

== Group B ==
=== Brazil ===
The squad was announced on 12 July 2021.

Head coach: (Spain) Jorge Dueñas

No.	Pos.	Name	Date of birth (age)	Height	App.	Goals	Club
2	CB	Bruna de Paula	26 September 1996 (aged 24)	1.70 m	57	142	(France) Metz HB
3	RW	Alexandra do Nascimento	16 September 1981 (aged 39)	1.77 m	196	749	(France) Bourg-de-Péage DHB
7	P	Tamires Morena Lima	16 May 1994 (aged 27)	1.83 m	104	148	(Romania) HC Dunărea Brăila
9	CB	Ana Paula Belo	18 October 1987 (aged 33)	1.72 m	190	703	(Romania) HC Dunărea Brăila
12	GK	Bárbara Arenhart	4 October 1986 (aged 34)	1.81 m	166	10	(Slovenia) RK Krim
18	LB	Eduarda Amorim	23 September 1986 (aged 34)	1.86 m	206	683	(Russia) Rostov-Don
20	LW	Larissa Araújo	1 July 1992 (aged 29)	1.67 m	53	107	(Romania) HC Dunărea Brăila
21	RW	Adriana Cardoso	29 October 1990 (aged 30)	1.67 m	33	102	(Spain) BM Bera Bera
22	LB	Samara Vieira	7 October 1991 (aged 29)	1.83 m	24	49	(Romania) HC Dunărea Brăila
23	LB	Giulia Guarieiro	3 April 1988 (aged 33)	1.74 m	2	0	(Spain) BM Granollers
30	RB	Gabriela Bitolo	1 April 1999 (aged 22)	1.80 m	8	4	(Spain) CB Elche
49	CB	Patrícia Matieli	8 November 1988 (aged 32)	1.68 m	47	50	(Poland) Zagłębie Lubin
77	LW	Dayane Rocha	24 March 1991 (aged 30)	1.68 m	64	74	(Spain) CB Salud Tenerife
87	GK	Renata Arruda	18 February 1999 (aged 22)	1.78 m	23	3	(Spain) BM Bera Bera
91	P	Lívia Ventura	18 January 1987 (aged 34)	1.70 m	17	23	(Portugal) Madeira Andebol SAD

=== France ===
The squad was announced on 5 July 2021. On 28 July, Alexandra Lacrabère was replaced by Océane Sercien-Ugolin.

Head coach: Olivier Krumbholz

No.	Pos.	Name	Date of birth (age)	Height	App.	Goals	Club
2	CB	Méline Nocandy	25 February 1998 (aged 23)	1.75 m	26	44	(France) Metz HB
3	RW	Blandine Dancette	14 February 1988 (aged 33)	1.69 m	110	145	(France) Nantes Atlantique Handball
4	RW	Pauline Coatanea	6 July 1993 (aged 28)	1.65 m	47	63	(France) Brest Bretagne HB
6	LW	Chloé Valentini	19 April 1995 (aged 26)	1.65 m	24	53	(France) Metz HB
7	LB	Allison Pineau	2 May 1989 (aged 32)	1.81 m	252	627	(Slovenia) RK Krim
8	LW	Coralie Lassource	1 September 1992 (aged 28)	1.70 m	28	28	(France) Brest Bretagne HB
10	CB	Grâce Zaadi Deuna	7 July 1993 (aged 28)	1.71 m	128	204	(Russia) Rostov-Don
12	GK	Amandine Leynaud	2 May 1986 (aged 35)	1.78 m	243	3	(Hungary) Győri Audi ETO KC
15	LB	Kalidiatou Niakaté	15 March 1995 (aged 26)	1.77 m	40	57	(France) Brest Bretagne HB
16	GK	Cléopatre Darleux	1 July 1989 (aged 32)	1.76 m	167	3	(France) Brest Bretagne HB
19	RB	Océane Sercien-Ugolin	15 December 1997 (aged 23)	1.83 m	22	35	(Slovenia) RK Krim
20	RB	Laura Flippes	13 December 1994 (aged 26)	1.71 m	78	137	(France) Paris 92
24	P	Béatrice Edwige	3 October 1988 (aged 32)	1.82 m	116	78	(Russia) Rostov-Don
26	P	Pauletta Foppa	22 December 2000 (aged 20)	1.77 m	31	49	(France) Brest Bretagne HB
27	LB	Estelle Nze Minko	11 August 1991 (aged 29)	1.78 m	126	284	(Hungary) Győri Audi ETO KC
64	RB	Alexandra Lacrabère	27 April 1987 (aged 34)	1.77 m	251	828	(France) Chambray Touraine

=== Hungary ===
The squad was announced on 2 July 2021. On 30 July, Zita Szucsánszki was replaced by Fanny Helembai, and Kinga Janurik was replaced by Melinda Szikora.

Head Coach: Gábor Elek

No.	Pos.	Name	Date of birth (age)	Height	App.	Goals	Club
2	LB	Szandra Zácsik	22 April 1990 (aged 31)	1.85 m	72	238	(Hungary) Ferencváros
6	LW	Nadine Schatzl	19 November 1993 (aged 27)	1.74 m	77	201	(Hungary) Győr
7	CB	Zita Szucsánszki	22 May 1987 (aged 34)	1.72 m	144	417	(Hungary) Ferencváros
8	CB	Anikó Kovacsics	29 August 1991 (aged 29)	1.70 m	142	310	(Hungary) Ferencváros
12	GK	Melinda Szikora	19 November 1988 (aged 32)	1.75 m	14	0	(Hungary) Siófok
14	P	Anett Kisfaludy	31 August 1990 (aged 30)	1.82 m	41	49	(Hungary) Ferencváros
16	GK	Blanka Bíró	22 September 1994 (aged 26)	1.87 m	86	2	(Hungary) Ferencváros
19	LW	Gréta Márton	3 October 1999 (aged 21)	1.73 m	29	66	(Hungary) Ferencváros
38	CB	Petra Vámos	14 September 2000 (aged 20)	1.75 m	17	23	(Hungary) Debrecen
42	RB	Katrin Klujber	21 April 1999 (aged 22)	1.70 m	31	149	(Hungary) Ferencváros
45	LB	Noémi Háfra	5 October 1998 (aged 22)	1.79 m	57	144	(Hungary) Győr
58	LP	Réka Bordás	26 August 1997 (aged 23)	1.84 m	3	7	(Hungary) Debrecen
61	GK	Kinga Janurik	6 November 1991 (aged 29)	1.76 m	39	1	(Hungary) Ferencváros
66	RW	Viktória Lukács	31 October 1995 (aged 25)	1.68 m	70	178	(Hungary) Győr
76	P	Fanny Helembai	26 December 1996 (aged 24)	1.78 m	12	16	(Hungary) Vác
87	LB	Zsuzsanna Tomori	18 June 1987 (aged 34)	1.87 m	183	454	(Hungary) Siófok
88	RB	Nikolett Kiss	23 July 1996 (aged 25)	1.82 m	21	30	(Hungary) Siófok

=== ROC ===
The squad was announced on 5 July 2021.

Head coach: Alexey Alekseev

No.	Pos.	Name	Date of birth (age)	Height	App.	Goals	Club
1	GK	Anna Sedoykina	1 August 1984 (aged 36)	1.84 m	168	9	(Russia) CSKA Moscow
2	LW	Polina Kuznetsova	6 October 1987 (aged 33)	1.68 m	163	428	(Russia) Rostov-Don
3	LW	Polina Gorshkova	22 November 1989 (aged 31)	1.73 m	23	44	(Russia) CSKA Moscow
7	CB	Daria Dmitrieva	9 August 1995 (aged 25)	1.78 m	108	365	(Russia) CSKA Moscow
8	LB/P	Anna Sen	12 March 1990 (aged 31)	1.86 m	158	387	(Russia) Rostov-Don
13	RB	Anna Vyakhireva	13 March 1995 (aged 26)	1.68 m	97	427	(Russia) Rostov-Don
14	LB	Polina Vedekhina	6 January 1994 (aged 27)	1.77 m	47	100	(Russia) CSKA Moscow
17	LB	Vladlena Bobrovnikova	24 October 1987 (aged 33)	1.80 m	81	209	(Russia) Rostov-Don
19	P	Kseniya Makeyeva	19 September 1990 (aged 30)	1.86 m	164	313	(Russia) Rostov-Don
23	LB	Elena Mikhaylichenko	14 September 2001 (aged 19)	1.80 m	17	23	(Russia) CSKA Moscow
25	RW	Olga Fomina	17 April 1989 (aged 32)	1.75 m	140	294	(Russia) HC Lada
33	CB	Ekaterina Ilina	7 March 1991 (aged 30)	1.74 m	108	274	(Russia) CSKA Moscow
36	RW	Yulia Managarova	27 September 1988 (aged 32)	1.67 m	59	197	(Russia) Rostov-Don
39	RB	Antonina Skorobogatchenko	14 February 1999 (aged 22)	1.82 m	47	112	(Russia) CSKA Moscow
88	GK	Victoriya Kalinina	8 December 1988 (aged 32)	1.82 m	106	1	(Russia) Rostov-Don

=== Spain ===
The squad was announced on 12 July 2021.

Head coach: Carlos Viver

No.	Pos.	Name	Date of birth (age)	Height	App.	Goals	Club
2	RW	Marta López	4 February 1990 (aged 31)	1.68 m	125	269	(Romania) CS Rapid București
4	RW	Carmen Martín	29 May 1988 (aged 33)	1.69 m	231	800	(Romania) CSM București
10	P	Elisabet Cesáreo	25 May 1999 (aged 22)	1.77 m	29	14	(Spain) BM Bera Bera
12	GK	Silvia Navarro	20 March 1979 (aged 42)	1.68 m	220	10	(Spain) BM Remudas
16	GK	Mercedes Castellanos	21 July 1988 (aged 33)	1.85 m	44	1	(Spain) CBF Málaga Costa del Sol
17	LW	Jennifer Gutiérrez Bermejo	20 February 1995 (aged 26)	1.69 m	57	117	(Germany) Borussia Dortmund
25	CB	Nerea Pena	13 December 1989 (aged 31)	1.75 m	169	567	(Norway) Vipers Kristiansand
27	LB	Lara González Ortega	22 February 1992 (aged 29)	1.84 m	131	130	(France) Paris 92
30	LW	Soledad López	4 April 1992 (aged 29)	1.62 m	41	98	(Spain) CBF Málaga Costa del Sol
34	CB	Alicia Fernández	21 December 1992 (aged 28)	1.72 m	51	132	(Romania) CS Rapid București
39	RB	Almudena Rodríguez	9 November 1993 (aged 27)	1.75 m	72	136	(Romania) CS Gloria 2018 Bistrița-Năsăud
44	P	Ainhoa Hernández	27 April 1994 (aged 27)	1.80 m	94	141	(Spain) BM Zuazo
62	RB	Paula Arcos	21 December 2001 (aged 19)	1.68 m	2	3	(Spain) CB Atlético Guardés
86	LB	Alexandrina Cabral	5 May 1986 (aged 35)	1.75 m	120	573	(Romania) CSM București
99	RB	Mireya González	18 July 1991 (aged 30)	1.78 m	90	176	(Romania) SCM Râmnicu Vâlcea

=== Sweden ===
The squad was announced on 18 June 2021. Nina Dano was added after the squad limit was increased from 14 to 15 players. On 21 July, four days before the tournament started, Isabelle Andersson was replaced by Johanna Westberg, because of a knee injury during preparations.

Head coach: Tomas Axnér

No.	Pos.	Name	Date of birth (age)	Height	App.	Goals	Club
1	GK	Johanna Bundsen	3 June 1991 (aged 30)	1.85 m	95	1	(Denmark) København Håndbold
6	CB	Carin Strömberg	10 July 1993 (aged 28)	1.84 m	103	127	(France) Nantes Atlantique Handball
7	P	Linn Blohm	20 May 1992 (aged 29)	1.80 m	113	303	(Hungary) Győri Audi ETO KC
8	LB	Jamina Roberts	28 May 1990 (aged 31)	1.76 m	177	377	(Sweden) IK Sävehof
9	CB	Melissa Petrén	18 January 1995 (aged 26)	1.73 m	29	64	(Denmark) København Håndbold
10	RW	Mathilda Lundström	20 December 1996 (aged 24)	1.64 m	47	55	(Sweden) IK Sävehof
14	LB	Johanna Westberg	6 April 1990 (aged 31)	1.87 m	71	132	(Denmark) Nykøbing Falster HK
16	GK	Jessica Ryde	18 May 1994 (aged 27)	1.85 m	23	0	(Denmark) Herning-Ikast Håndbold
17	RB	Nina Dano	12 June 2000 (aged 21)	1.72 m	14	16	(Denmark) HH Elite
19	P	Anna Lagerquist	16 October 1993 (aged 27)	1.75 m	69	102	(Russia) Rostov-Don
23	RB	Emma Lindqvist	17 September 1997 (aged 23)	1.77 m	32	54	(Denmark) Herning-Ikast Håndbold
24	RW	Nathalie Hagman	19 July 1991 (aged 30)	1.67 m	165	519	(France) Nantes Atlantique Handball
29	LB	Kristin Thorleifsdóttir	13 January 1998 (aged 23)	1.82 m	16	32	(Denmark) Randers HK
38	LW	Elin Hansson	7 August 1996 (aged 24)	1.73 m	17	16	(Sweden) Skuru IK
42	CB	Jenny Carlson	17 April 1995 (aged 26)	1.72 m	5	14	(Denmark) Holstebro Håndbold

== See also ==
- Handball at the 2020 Summer Olympics – Men's team rosters
