= Handball at the 2020 Summer Olympics – Men's team rosters =

This article shows the rosters of all participating teams at the men's handball tournament at the 2020 Summer Olympics in Tokyo.

Each roster consists of 15 players, where 14 can be chosen for each match. The players can be changed without restrictions.

Age, clubs, caps and goals as of the start of the tournament, 24 July 2021.

== Group A ==
=== Argentina ===
The squad was announced on 2 July 2021. On 31 July, Federico Pizarro was replaced by Santiago Baronetto.

Head coach: (Spain) Manolo Cadenas

No.	Pos.	Name	Date of birth (age)	Height	App.	Goals	Club
2	LW	Federico Fernández	17 October 1989 (aged 31)	1.91 m	186	686	(Argentina) San Fernando HB
3	RW	Federico Pizarro	7 September 1986 (aged 34)	1.83 m	217	703	(Spain) Ciudad Encantada
4	CB	Sebastián Simonet	12 May 1986 (aged 35)	1.90 m	190	405	(Argentina) SAG Villa Ballester
6	CB	Diego Simonet	26 December 1989 (aged 31)	1.89 m	105	324	(France) Montpellier Handball
7	LW	Ignacio Pizarro	8 February 1990 (aged 31)	1.78 m	58	161	(Argentina) San Fernando HB
8	LB	Pablo Simonet	4 May 1992 (aged 29)	1.85 m	111	236	(Spain) Ciudad Encantada
9	RW	Santiago Baronetto	27 October 1992 (aged 28)	1.87 m	57	156	(Spain) CB Villa De Aranda
11	P	Lucas Moscariello	19 February 1992 (aged 29)	1.90 m	68	146	(France) Montpellier Handball
15	P	Gonzalo Carou	15 August 1979 (aged 41)	1.90 m	265	247	(Spain) Puerto Sagunto
19	CB	Pedro Martinez Cami	20 December 1999 (aged 21)	1.90 m	9	19	(Spain) C.D. Ademar LeÓn
20	RW	Ramiro Martínez	22 July 1995 (aged 26)	1.80 m	36	80	(Spain) Balonmano Sinfín
22	P	Gastón Mouriño	12 October 1994 (aged 26)	1.92 m	43	69	(Russia) Don Cossacks SFEDU
23	RW	Pablo Vainstein	18 July 1989 (aged 32)	1.84 m	104	112	(Spain) BM Benidorm
40	GK	Leonel Maciel	4 January 1989 (aged 32)	1.92 m	88	11	(Spain) FC Barcelona
77	LB	Nicolás Bonanno	18 November 1991 (aged 29)	1.98 m	56	56	(Spain) Anaitasuna
87	GK	Juan Bar	29 June 1987 (aged 34)	1.90 m	39	2	(Spain) Anaitasuna

=== Brazil ===
The squad was announced on 12 July 2021. On 28 July, José Toledo was replaced by Henrique Teixeira.

Head coach: Marcus Oliveira

No.	Pos.	Name	Date of birth (age)	Height	App.	Goals	Club
2	CB	Henrique Teixeira	27 February 1989 (aged 32)	1.92 m	131	203	(Romania) CSM București
4	CB	João Silva	29 January 1994 (aged 27)	1.90 m	64	114	(Spain) BM Puente Genil
5	LW	Guilherme Torriani	6 February 1999 (aged 22)	1.86 m	16	27	(Brazil) HC Taubaté
10	RB	José Toledo	11 January 1994 (aged 27)	1.93 m	89	224	(Romania) CS Minaur Baia Mare
13	P	Rogério Moraes Ferreira	11 January 1994 (aged 27)	2.04 m	44	98	Not attached
14	LB	Thiagus Petrus	25 January 1989 (aged 32)	1.98 m	152	228	(Spain) FC Barcelona
16	GK	Rangel da Rosa	11 May 1996 (aged 25)	1.89 m	34	3	(Spain) CB Ciudad de Logroño
18	LW	Felipe Borges	4 May 1985 (aged 36)	1.88 m	223	796	(France) US Créteil Handball
19	RW	Fábio Chiuffa	10 March 1989 (aged 32)	1.87 m	157	404	(Romania) HC Dobrogea Sud Constanța
25	P	Vinícius Teixeira	3 April 1988 (aged 33)	1.88 m	146	551	(Brazil) HC Taubaté
33	CB	Leonardo Dutra	29 March 1996 (aged 25)	1.84 m	27	63	(Spain) CB Ciudad de Logroño
35	LB	Thiago Ponciano	8 May 1994 (aged 27)	1.93 m	39	26	(Spain) Ciudad Encantada
37	LB	Haniel Langaro	7 March 1995 (aged 26)	1.97 m	82	364	(Spain) FC Barcelona
62	GK	Leonardo Terçariol	14 April 1987 (aged 34)	1.94 m	53	3	(Spain) BM Benidorm
77	RW	Rudolph Hackbarth	10 March 1994 (aged 27)	1.89 m	51	126	(Spain) CB Ciudad de Logroño
95	RB	Gustavo Rodrigues	9 April 1995 (aged 26)	1.90 m	47	115	(France) Chambéry Savoie Handball

=== France ===
The squad was announced on 5 July 2021. On 2 August, Timothey N'Guessan was replaced by Romain Lagarde.

Head coach: Guillaume Gille

No.	Pos.	Name	Date of birth (age)	Height	App.	Goals	Club
5	CB	Nedim Remili	18 July 1995 (aged 26)	1.95 m	84	253	(France) Paris Saint-Germain
7	LB	Romain Lagarde	5 March 1997 (aged 24)	1.94 m	51	66	(France) Pays d'Aix Université Club
9	RB	Melvyn Richardson	31 January 1997 (aged 24)	1.90 m	33	72	(Spain) FC Barcelona
10	RB	Dika Mem	31 August 1997 (aged 23)	1.94 m	67	181	(Spain) FC Barcelona
11	P	Nicolas Tournat	5 April 1994 (aged 27)	2.00 m	47	66	(Poland) Łomża Vive Kielce
12	GK	Vincent Gérard	16 December 1986 (aged 34)	1.89 m	112	16	(France) Paris Saint-Germain
13	LB	Nikola Karabatić	11 April 1984 (aged 37)	1.96 m	313	1210	(France) Paris Saint-Germain
14	CB	Kentin Mahé	22 May 1991 (aged 30)	1.86 m	124	408	(Hungary) Telekom Veszprém
16	GK	Yann Genty	26 December 1981 (aged 39)	1.85 m	16	0	(France) Paris Saint-Germain
17	LB	Timothey N'Guessan	18 September 1992 (aged 28)	1.96 m	87	175	(Spain) FC Barcelona
19	RW	Luc Abalo	6 September 1984 (aged 36)	1.82 m	278	836
21	LW	Michaël Guigou	28 January 1982 (aged 39)	1.80 m	298	1001	(France) USAM Nîmes Gard
22	P	Luka Karabatić	19 April 1988 (aged 33)	2.02 m	112	131	(France) Paris Saint-Germain
23	P	Ludovic Fabregas	1 July 1996 (aged 25)	1.98 m	87	177	(Spain) FC Barcelona
25	LW	Hugo Descat	16 August 1992 (aged 28)	1.82 m	17	66	(France) Montpellier Handball
28	RW	Valentin Porte	7 September 1990 (aged 30)	1.90 m	140	342	(France) Montpellier Handball

=== Germany ===
The squad was announced on 30 June 2021.

Head coach: (Iceland) Alfreð Gíslason

No.	Pos.	Name	Date of birth (age)	Height	App.	Goals	Club
1	GK	Johannes Bitter	2 September 1982 (aged 38)	2.05 m	161	1	(Germany) HSV Hamburg
3	LW	Uwe Gensheimer	26 October 1986 (aged 34)	1.88 m	196	945	(Germany) Rhein-Neckar Löwen
4	P	Johannes Golla	5 November 1997 (aged 23)	1.95 m	22	57	(Germany) SG Flensburg-Handewitt
6	LB	Finn Lemke	30 April 1992 (aged 29)	2.10 m	82	31	(Germany) MT Melsungen
13	P	Hendrik Pekeler	2 July 1991 (aged 30)	2.03 m	114	194	(Germany) THW Kiel
15	CB	Juri Knorr	9 May 2000 (aged 21)	1.90 m	11	13	(Germany) Rhein-Neckar Löwen
17	RB	Steffen Weinhold	19 July 1986 (aged 35)	1.91 m	129	307	(Germany) THW Kiel
20	LB	Philipp Weber	15 September 1992 (aged 28)	1.94 m	43	108	(Germany) SC Magdeburg
25	RB	Kai Häfner	10 July 1989 (aged 32)	1.92 m	104	228	(Germany) MT Melsungen
31	LW	Marcel Schiller	15 August 1991 (aged 29)	1.89 m	20	89	(Germany) Frisch Auf Göppingen
33	GK	Andreas Wolff	3 March 1991 (aged 30)	1.98 m	102	13	(Poland) Łomża Vive Kielce
35	LB	Julius Kühn	1 April 1993 (aged 28)	1.98 m	76	246	(Germany) MT Melsungen
48	P	Jannik Kohlbacher	19 July 1995 (aged 26)	1.93 m	75	158	(Germany) Rhein-Neckar Löwen
73	RW	Timo Kastening	25 June 1995 (aged 26)	1.80 m	27	89	(Germany) MT Melsungen
95	CB	Paul Drux	7 February 1995 (aged 26)	1.92 m	99	185	(Germany) Füchse Berlin

=== Norway ===
The squad was announced on 3 July 2021. On 21 July, three days before the tournament started, it was announced that Gøran Johannessen had to leave because of an injury, and he was replaced by Simen Holand Pettersen.

Head coach: Christian Berge

No.	Pos.	Name	Date of birth (age)	Height	App.	Goals	Club
5	CB	Sander Sagosen	14 September 1995 (aged 25)	1.95 m	121	601	(Germany) THW Kiel
8	P	Bjarte Myrhol	29 May 1982 (aged 39)	1.92 m	257	795	Not attached
10	CB	Magnus Fredriksen	24 May 1997 (aged 24)	1.88 m	14	12	(Germany) HSG Wetzlar
11	P	Petter Øverby	26 March 1992 (aged 29)	2.00 m	84	65	(Germany) HC Erlangen
12	GK	Kristian Sæverås	22 June 1996 (aged 25)	1.97 m	30	1	(Germany) SC DHfK Leipzig
15	RB	Kent Robin Tønnesen	5 June 1991 (aged 30)	1.95 m	114	297	(Hungary) MOL-Pick Szeged
17	LW	Magnus Jøndal	7 February 1988 (aged 33)	1.81 m	171	552	Not attached
19	RW	Kristian Bjørnsen	10 January 1989 (aged 32)	1.92 m	141	554	(Denmark) Aalborg Håndbold
21	P	Magnus Gullerud	13 November 1991 (aged 29)	1.93 m	138	174	(Germany) SC Magdeburg
24	CB	Christian O'Sullivan	22 August 1991 (aged 29)	1.90 m	137	218	(Germany) SC Magdeburg
26	LB	Simen Holand Pettersen	8 April 1998 (aged 23)	1.92 m	6	5	(Norway) Elverum Håndball
27	RB	Harald Reinkind	17 August 1992 (aged 28)	1.96 m	121	246	(Germany) THW Kiel
30	GK	Torbjørn Bergerud	16 July 1994 (aged 27)	2.00 m	99	0	(Denmark) GOG Håndbold
44	RW	Kevin Gulliksen	9 November 1996 (aged 24)	1.80 m	49	81	(Germany) Frisch Auf Göppingen
77	RB	Magnus Abelvik Rød	7 July 1997 (aged 24)	2.03 m	59	118	(Germany) SG Flensburg-Handewitt

=== Spain ===
The squad was announced on 14 July 2021. On 29 July, Viran Morros was replaced by Miguel Sánchez-Migallón.

Head coach: Jordi Ribera

No.	Pos.	Name	Date of birth (age)	Height	App.	Goals	Club
1	GK	Gonzalo Pérez de Vargas	10 January 1991 (aged 30)	1.89 m	113	10	(Spain) Barça
3	RB	Eduardo Gurbindo	8 November 1987 (aged 33)	1.95 m	121	167	(North Macedonia) RK Vardar
5	RB	Jorge Maqueda	6 February 1988 (aged 33)	1.97 m	139	353	(Hungary) Telekom Veszprém
6	LW	Ángel Fernández	16 September 1988 (aged 32)	1.93 m	60	180	(Spain) Barça
9	CB	Raúl Entrerríos	12 February 1981 (aged 40)	1.88 m	269	618	Not attached
10	RB	Alex Dujshebaev	17 December 1992 (aged 28)	1.88 m	99	264	(Poland) Łomża Vive Kielce
11	CB	Daniel Sarmiento	25 August 1983 (aged 37)	1.88 m	120	244	(France) Saint-Raphaël
12	GK	Rodrigo Corrales	24 January 1991 (aged 30)	2.00 m	72	3	(Hungary) Telekom Veszprém
13	P	Julen Aguinagalde	8 December 1982 (aged 38)	1.96 m	197	470	(Spain) CD Bidasoa
14	RW	Ferran Solé	25 August 1992 (aged 28)	1.93 m	50	213	(France) Paris Saint-Germain
17	P	Adrià Figueras	8 December 1988 (aged 32)	1.93 m	78	186	(France) C' Chartres MHB
24	LB	Viran Morros	15 December 1983 (aged 37)	1.99 m	228	166	(Germany) Füchse Berlin
26	LB	Antonio García Robledo	6 March 1984 (aged 37)	1.93 m	78	145	(Spain) BM Granollers
28	RW	Aleix Gómez	7 May 1997 (aged 24)	1.84 m	35	118	(Spain) Barça
30	P	Gedeón Guardiola	1 October 1984 (aged 36)	1.98 m	147	177	(Germany) TBV Lemgo
51	LW	Miguel Sánchez-Migallón	8 February 1995 (aged 26)	2.02 m	4	4	(Spain) CB Ciudad de Logroño

== Group B ==
=== Bahrain ===
The squad was announced on 11 July 2021. On 27 July, Komail Mahfoodh was replaced by Bilal Basham Askani.

Head coach: (Iceland) Aron Kristjánsson

No.	Pos.	Name	Date of birth (age)	Height	App.	Goals	Club
1	GK	Husain Mahfoodh	29 June 2001 (aged 20)	1.86 m	51	5	(Bahrain) Al-Ahli
3	CB	Ali Abdulla Eid	18 January 1991 (aged 30)	1.75 m	69	125	(Bahrain) Al-Najma
8	RB	Hasan Merza	18 June 1998 (aged 23)	1.65 m	30	26	(Bahrain) Al-Tadhamun
9	LW	Hasan Al-Samahiji	22 February 1991 (aged 30)	1.77 m	72	253	(Bahrain) Al-Ahli
15	LB	Mohamed Abdulredha	27 September 1989 (aged 31)	1.86 m	64	92	(Bahrain) Al-Ahli
18	RW	Ahmed Jalal	31 January 1998 (aged 23)	1.68 m	74	137	(Bahrain) Al-Shabab
19	P	Mohamed Merza	17 April 1987 (aged 34)	1.84 m	89	158	(Bahrain) Al-Najma
21	GK	Mohamed Abdulhusain	12 August 1989 (aged 31)	1.75 m	259	15	(Bahrain) Al-Najma
27	RW	Bilal Basham Askani	7 April 1991 (aged 30)	1.65 m	75	110	(Bahrain) Al-Najma
50	CB	Ahmed Al-Maqabi	26 October 1994 (aged 26)	1.75 m	78	103	(Kuwait) Al-Qadsia SC
66	LB	Komail Mahfoodh	28 April 1992 (aged 29)	1.89 m	74	137	(Bahrain) Al-Najma
77	RB	Ali Merza	7 July 1988 (aged 33)	1.80 m	159	433	(Bahrain) Al-Najma
89	LW	Mahdi Saad	15 March 1989 (aged 32)	1.73 m	129	270	(Bahrain) Al-Najma
93	LB	Mohamed Habib	20 July 1993 (aged 28)	1.65 m	300	250	(Saudi Arabia) Mudhar
95	CB	Mohamed Mohamed	7 February 2001 (aged 20)	1.75 m	300	120	(Bahrain) Al-Najma
99	CB	Husain Al-Sayyad (c)	14 January 1988 (aged 33)	1.75 m	482	1200	(Bahrain) Al-Najma

=== Denmark ===
The squad was announced on 1 July 2021.

Head coach: Nikolaj Jacobsen

No.	Pos.	Name	Date of birth (age)	Height	App.	Goals	Club
1	GK	Niklas Landin Jacobsen	19 December 1988 (aged 32)	2.01 m	224	10	(Germany) THW Kiel
4	LW	Magnus Landin Jacobsen	20 August 1995 (aged 25)	1.97 m	78	163	(Germany) THW Kiel
7	LW	Emil Jakobsen	24 January 1998 (aged 23)	1.90 m	15	58	(Germany) SG Flensburg-Handewitt
15	P	Magnus Saugstrup	12 July 1996 (aged 25)	1.95 m	29	55	(Germany) SC Magdeburg
17	RW	Lasse Svan	31 August 1983 (aged 37)	1.85 m	227	536	(Germany) SG Flensburg-Handewitt
20	GK	Kevin Møller	20 June 1989 (aged 32)	2.00 m	40	5	(Germany) SG Flensburg-Handewitt
21	CB	Henrik Møllgaard	2 January 1985 (aged 36)	1.97 m	171	178	(Denmark) Aalborg Håndbold
22	CB	Mads Mensah Larsen	12 August 1991 (aged 29)	1.88 m	149	275	(Germany) SG Flensburg-Handewitt
23	P	Henrik Toft Hansen	18 December 1986 (aged 34)	2.00 m	131	234	(France) Paris Saint-Germain
24	LB	Mikkel Hansen	22 October 1987 (aged 33)	1.92 m	222	1121	(France) Paris Saint-Germain
25	CB	Morten Olsen	11 October 1984 (aged 36)	1.84 m	110	214	(Denmark) GOG Håndbold
26	RW	Jóhan Hansen	1 May 1994 (aged 27)	1.90 m	44	95	(Germany) TSV Hannover-Burgdorf
28	LB	Lasse Andersson	11 March 1994 (aged 27)	1.90 m	44	52	(Germany) Füchse Berlin
32	LB	Jacob Holm	5 September 1995 (aged 25)	1.94 m	39	100	(Germany) Füchse Berlin
33	RB	Mathias Gidsel	8 February 1999 (aged 22)	1.90 m	16	68	(Denmark) GOG Håndbold

=== Egypt ===
The squad was announced on 12 July 2021.

Head coach: (Spain) Roberto García Parrondo

No.	Pos.	Name	Date of birth (age)	Height	App.	Goals	Club
5	RB	Yahia Omar	9 September 1997 (aged 23)	1.94 m	52	171	(Hungary) Telekom Veszprém
15	LB	Ahmed Hesham	15 May 2000 (aged 21)	1.91 m	9	15	(France) USAM Nîmes Gard
24	P	Ibrahim El-Masry	11 March 1989 (aged 32)	1.92 m	249	74	(Egypt) Al Ahly
25	P	Wisam Nawar	14 February 1990 (aged 31)	1.84 m	109	42	(Egypt) Zamalek
31	LW	Omar El-Wakil	14 May 1988 (aged 33)	1.74 m	205	264	(Egypt) Zamalek
39	LB	Yehia El-Deraa	17 July 1995 (aged 26)	1.92 m	143	264	(Egypt) Zamalek
42	LB	Hassan Kaddah	1 May 2000 (aged 21)	2.05 m	39	38	(Egypt) Zamalek
45	CB	Seif El-Deraa	19 September 1998 (aged 22)	1.87 m	39	66	(Egypt) Zamalek
66	RB	Ahmed El-Ahmar	27 January 1984 (aged 37)	1.86 m	322	1425	(Egypt) Zamalek
80	P	Ahmed Mesilhy	25 November 1994 (aged 26)	1.84 m	12	6	(Egypt) Al Ahly
88	GK	Karim Handawy	1 May 1988 (aged 33)	1.88 m	163	0	(North Macedonia) RK Eurofarm Pelister
89	P	Mohamed Mamdouh Shebib	1 April 1989 (aged 32)	1.94 m	244	288	(Romania) Dinamo București
90	LB	Ali Zein	14 December 1990 (aged 30)	1.93 m	299	409	(United Arab Emirates) Sharjah
91	RW	Mohammad Sanad	16 January 1991 (aged 30)	1.88 m	152	373	(France) USAM Nîmes Gard
96	GK	Mohamed El-Tayar	7 April 1996 (aged 25)	1.91 m	49	0	(Egypt) Al Ahly

=== Japan ===
The squad was announced on 8 July 2021.

Head coach: (Iceland) Dagur Sigurðsson

No.	Pos.	Name	Date of birth (age)	Height	App.	Goals	Club
10	LW	Naoki Sugioka	18 April 1994 (aged 27)	1.77 m	33	37	(Japan) Toyota Auto Body
12	GK	Yuta Iwashita	21 June 1991 (aged 30)	1.83 m	20	1	(Japan) Toyota Boshoku Kyushu
13	P	Kenya Kasahara	15 May 1988 (aged 33)	1.97 m	77	64	(Japan) Toyota Auto Body
15	LB	Adam Yuki Baig	12 April 1999 (aged 22)	1.94 m	43	79	(Japan) Chuo University
18	LB	Kohei Narita	15 June 1989 (aged 32)	1.91 m	93	136	(Japan) Wakunaga Pharmaceutical
19	RB	Shinnosuke Tokuda	6 December 1995 (aged 25)	1.78 m	63	224	(Japan) Toyoda Gosei
20	RB	Jin Watanabe	17 January 1990 (aged 31)	1.83 m	95	305	(Japan) Toyota Auto Body
21	LW	Remi Anri Doi	28 September 1989 (aged 31)	1.80 m	60	145	(Japan) Zeekstar Tokyo
22	GK	Motoki Sakai	10 November 1995 (aged 25)	1.92 m	25	3	(Japan) Toyoda Gosei
25	RW	Hiroki Motoki	14 February 1992 (aged 29)	1.82 m	86	235	(Japan) Osaki Osol
31	LB	Tatsuki Yoshino	13 July 1994 (aged 27)	1.83 m	46	181	(Japan) Toyota Auto Body
33	CB	Yuto Agarie	6 July 1993 (aged 28)	1.83 m	69	238	(Japan) Zeekstar Tokyo
38	CB	Kotaro Mizumachi	13 March 1995 (aged 26)	1.83 m	8	12	(Japan) Toyoda Gosei
41	RB	Rennosuke Tokuda	15 May 1998 (aged 23)	1.80 m	11	20	(Poland) Grupa Azoty Tarnów
43	P	Shuichi Yoshida	26 March 2001 (aged 20)	1.91 m	10	23	(Poland) Grupa Azoty Tarnów

=== Portugal ===
The squad was announced on 13 July 2021.

Head coach: Paulo Pereira

No.	Pos.	Name	Date of birth (age)	Height	App.	Goals	Club
4	RW	Pedro Portela	6 January 1990 (aged 31)	1.86 m	90	295	Tremblay-en-France Handball
5	LB	Gilberto Duarte	6 July 1990 (aged 31)	1.97 m	101	295	(France) Montpellier Handball
8	P	Victor Iturriza	22 May 1990 (aged 31)	1.93 m	15	51	(Portugal) FC Porto
9	RB	João Ferraz	8 January 1990 (aged 31)	1.98 m	94	156	(Switzerland) HSC Suhr Aarau
10	CB	Miguel Martins	4 November 1997 (aged 23)	1.92 m	56	129	(Hungary) MOL-Pick Szeged
14	CB	Rui Silva	28 April 1993 (aged 28)	1.86 m	93	147	(Portugal) FC Porto
15	P	Daymaro Salina	1 September 1987 (aged 33)	2.00 m	57	100	(Portugal) FC Porto
16	GK	Humberto Gomes	1 January 1978 (aged 43)	1.93 m	85	0	(Portugal) Póvoa AC
22	P	Alexis Borges	6 October 1991 (aged 29)	1.96 m	39	65	(Portugal) S.L. Benfica
23	LW	Diogo Branquinho	25 July 1994 (aged 26)	1.85 m	55	130	(Portugal) FC Porto
25	RW	António Areia	21 June 1990 (aged 31)	1.90 m	58	163	(Portugal) FC Porto
27	LB	André Gomes	27 July 1998 (aged 22)	1.92 m	32	82	(Portugal) FC Porto
41	GK	Gustavo Capdeville	31 August 1997 (aged 23)	1.90 m	14	0	(Portugal) S.L. Benfica
82	P	Luís Frade	11 September 1998 (aged 22)	1.94 m	29	38	(Spain) Barcelona
88	LB	Fábio Magalhães	12 March 1988 (aged 33)	1.94 m	152	315	(Portugal) FC Porto

=== Sweden ===
The squad was announced on 18 June 2021. Anton Lindskog was added after the squad limit was increased from 14 to 15 players.

Head coach: (Norway) Glenn Solberg

No.	Pos.	Name	Date of birth (age)	Height	App.	Goals	Club
2	LB	Jonathan Carlsbogård	19 April 1995 (aged 26)	1.95 m	18	37	(Germany) TBV Lemgo
5	P	Max Darj	27 September 1991 (aged 29)	1.92 m	78	62	(Germany) Bergischer HC
10	RW	Niclas Ekberg	23 December 1988 (aged 32)	1.91 m	183	758	(Germany) THW Kiel
11	RW	Daniel Pettersson	6 May 1992 (aged 29)	1.79 m	45	121	(Germany) SC Magdeburg
12	GK	Andreas Palicka	10 July 1986 (aged 35)	1.89 m	122	9	(Germany) Rhein-Neckar Löwen
15	LW	Hampus Wanne	10 December 1993 (aged 27)	1.85 m	47	155	(Germany) SG Flensburg-Handewitt
16	GK	Mikael Aggefors	20 January 1985 (aged 36)	1.91 m	35	0	(Denmark) Aalborg Håndbold
18	P	Fredric Pettersson	11 February 1989 (aged 32)	2.01 m	72	96	(France) Fenix Toulouse Handball
19	CB	Felix Claar	5 January 1997 (aged 24)	1.92 m	25	39	(Denmark) Aalborg Håndbold
22	LW	Lucas Pellas	28 August 1995 (aged 25)	1.84 m	32	98	(France) Montpellier HB
23	RB	Albin Lagergren	11 September 1992 (aged 28)	1.86 m	63	185	(Germany) Rhein-Neckar Löwen
24	CB	Jim Gottfridsson	2 September 1992 (aged 28)	1.91 m	107	349	(Germany) SG Flensburg-Handewitt
27	LB	Oskar Sunnefeldt	21 April 1998 (aged 23)	1.98 m	13	14	(Germany) SC DHfK Leipzig
33	RB	Lukas Sandell	3 February 1997 (aged 24)	1.92 m	13	32	(Denmark) Aalborg Håndbold
66	P	Anton Lindskog	7 December 1993 (aged 27)	1.98 m	28	17	(Germany) SG Flensburg-Handewitt

== See also ==
- Handball at the 2020 Summer Olympics – Women's team rosters
