= Kafatos =

Kafatos (Greek: Καφάτος) is a Greek surname. Notable people with the surname include:

- Dimitrios Kafatos (born 1976), Greek handball player
- Fotis Kafatos (1940–2017), Greek biologist
- Menas Kafatos (born 1945), American physicist
