= Jesper Meinby =

Danish handball player (born 1987)

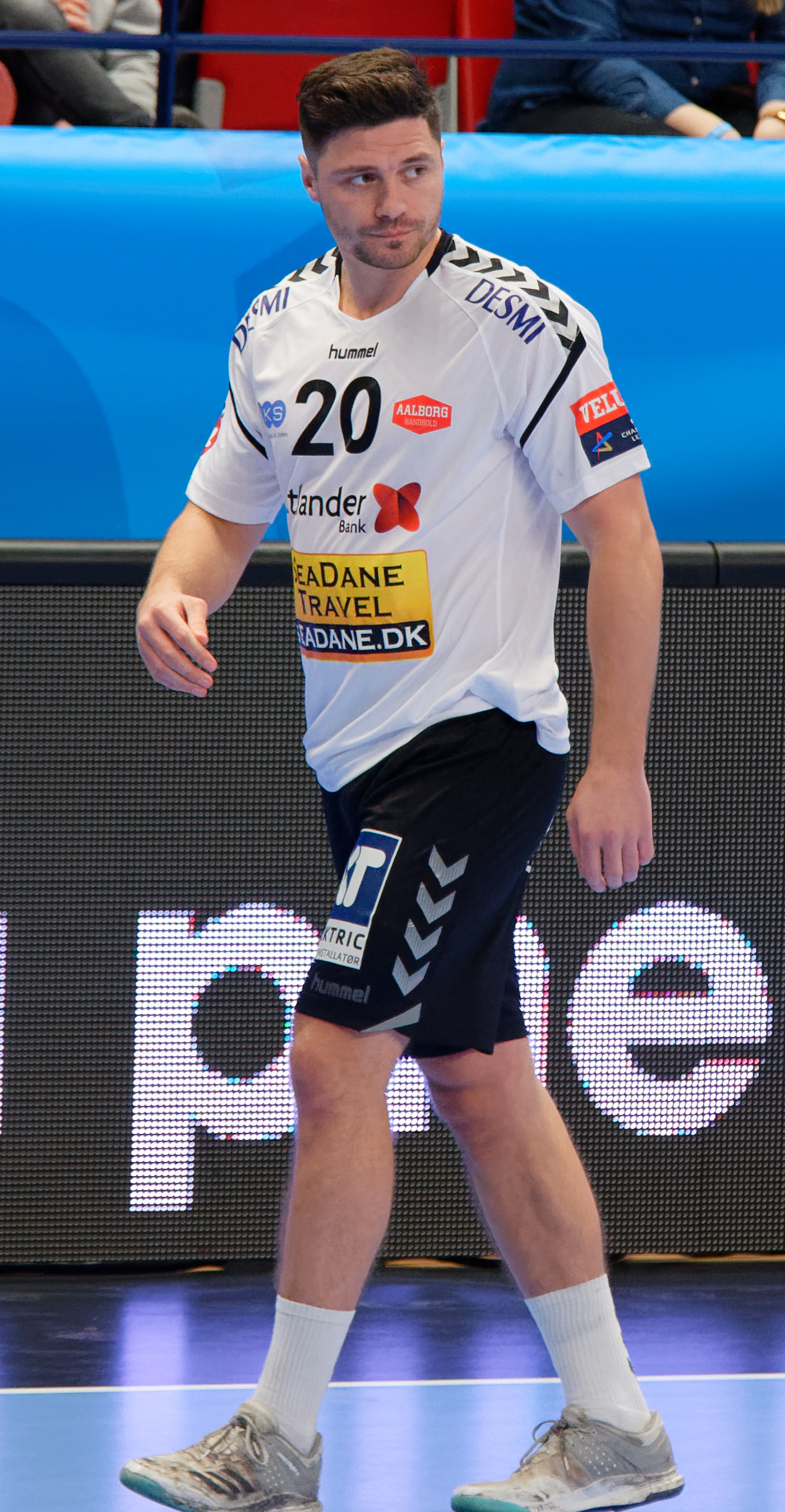

Personal information
- Full name: Jesper Meinby Pedersen
- Nationality: Danish
- Born: 24 April 1987 (age 39) Sundby, Denmark
- Height: 185 cm (6 ft 1 in)

Sport
- Sport: Handball
- Position: Right Back

Senior clubs
- Years: Team
- 2005-2007: Mors-Thy Håndbold
- 2007–2012: Viborg HK
- –: Mors-Thy Håndbold
- 2015–2016: Aalborg Håndbold
- 2016-2017: Massy Essonne Handball
- 2017-2019: Aalborg Håndbold
- 2019–2020: Drammen HK
- 2020–2021: AEK Athens
- 2021: Drammen HK
- 2021-2023: KIF Kolding

Jesper Meinby Pedersen (born 24 April 1987) is a Danish handball player.

== Career ==
He started his career at Mors-Thy Håndbold, where he was promoted from the Danish 1st Division to the Herrehåndboldligaen in his first season. He then joined Viborg HK, where he played for 5 years, before returning to Mors-Thy. He then joined Aalborg Håndbold, where he played until 2016. He then joined French side Massy Essonne Handball for year, before returning to Aalborg Håndbold.

He then played for two years at Norwegian Drammen HK. In 2020 while the Norwegian League was closed down due to COVID-19 he was loaned to Greek side AEK Athens. Here he won the EHF European Cup with the club. Afterwards he returned to Drammen, where he played until 2021. He then returned to Denmark to join KIF Kolding on a two-year deal. He left KIF Kolding after his contract expired in 2023. He played 57 league matches for the team, scoring 99 goals.

During his youth career, Meinby played several matches for the Danish national youth handball teams.
