= AEK H.C. =

Greek handball club

AEK
- Full name: AEK Handball Club
- Nicknames: Énosis (Union); Kitrinómavri (Yellow-Blacks); Dikéfalos Aetós (Two-Headed Eagle); "Magkes" (Hotshots)(unofficial nickname only used for AEK's handball team)
- Founded: 2005; 21 years ago
- Arena: G. Kassimatis Indoor Hall
- Capacity: 1,000
- President: Nikos Pantermalis
- Head coach: Alexandros Alvanos
- League: Handball Premier
- 2025–26: 2nd
- Club colours
Home	Away

AEK Handball Club is the handball department of the major Greek multi-sports club A.E.K. It was established in 2005 and it is the most successful Greek club in European handball competitions, as it won the European Challenge Cup in 2021 and was also a runner-up in 2018 and 2025. The club is commonly known in European competitions as AEK Athens HC.

== History ==
The department Handball of A.E.K. was founded by a decision of the General Assembly of A.E.K. on 12 July 2005.

On 5 August 2005, the Greek Handball Federation accepted a merger through the absorption of the association's Board of Handball GA Ilioupolis with AEK Handball Club.

During the period 2006–07, AEK Handball Club acquired the 3rd position in A1 (Greek Men's handball championship) and gained participation at European Cups for the first time.

During the period 2007–08, AEK participated in EHF Cup (European Handball Federation Cup) and was eliminated by Dinamo Baumit Bucuresti in the second round.

On 31 May 2009, with Nikos Georgantzoglou as president, AEK won the first Greek handball cup winning Filippos by a score of 33–31 in Serres.

For the period 2009–10 AEK participated at EHF Cup Winners' Cup.

For the third round of EHF Cup Winners' Cup, AEK HC played against BSB Izmir on 14 November 2009 in Athens (losing 24–29) and on 21 November 2009 in Smyrni (drawing 22–22). During the period 2009–10, AEK HC terminated at 4th position of A1, gaining its European participation for the 2nd consecutive time and for 3rd in general. In addition, AEK HC participated in the final four of Greek men's handball cup on 29 May 2010 in Lamia, but the semi-final game against PAOK did not take place due to fan "fights".

For the second round of the European Challenge Cup (2010–11), AEK HC won HC Dinamo Minsk 31–25 in Athens and lost 32–27 in Minsk and therefore AEK has been advanced to the top 16 teams. For the third round (phase of 16), AEK defeated Sporting Lisboa at penalties. AEK lost 27–23 in Lisboa but won 27–23 in Athens and so the game went on penalty-kicks, where AEK advanced to the top 8 with the final score of 32–27. For the Quarter-Final (phase 8), AEK played against Partizan of Beograd and was disqualified.

On 7 May 2011, AEK won the Greek handball championship through the playoffs and became champion for the first time in their short history. AEK needed only the win against PAOK at Thessaloniki and was losing by one goal (22–21) 30 seconds before the final whistle but with great will and power scored twice (the final goal at the exact second of the final) and gained the first championship of its history just 6 years after its establishment. AEK participated in the first round of the EHF Champions League for the period 2011–12 and also in the first round of Challenge Cup, losing to Lions (Holland).

On 17 March 2012, AEK participated in the final game of the Greek men's handball cup against PAOK but lost the game 26–24. AEK participated to the EHF Cup for the period 2012–13 but was eliminated by Diomidis Argous in the first round, losing both games at Argos and Athens.

On 3 March 2013, AEK won the second Greek handball cup in its history, winning PAOK by a score of 27–23 in Kerkyra (Corfu). The same year on 1 June 2013 AEK won the second Greek handball championship against Diomidis.

On 19 March 2014, AEK won the third Greek handball championship in its history, winning Diomidis 18–16 in Athens.

On 29 March 2015, AEK participated in the final of the Greek men's handball cup for the fifth time in a row, against PAOK, but lost the game by a score of 27–29. The team finished third in the Greek handball championship.

On 14 and 20 May 2018, AEK HC played the final games of EHF Challenge Cup 2017–18 and became one of the three most successful teams in Greek handball (including Diomidis Argous and Filippos Verias) in European achievements. In 2020, AEK won its third Greek Championship.

On 23 May 2021, AEK HC won the fourth Greek handball cup in its history, winning PAOK by a score of 24–22 in Kozani. On 30 May of the same year, AEK HC won the first EHF European Cup in its history by winning the Swedish club Ystads IF, this way AEK HC became the most successful Greek club in European handball competitions. AEK won its fourth Greek Championship on 6 July 2021 celebrating a historic treble.

At the start of the 2022–23 season, the club made several changes in the first-team squad due to last year's unsuccessful results. The first-team changes of the summer transfer period helped AEK to finish at the top of the league in the regular season. The club was drawn to play against Olympiacos after qualifying for the championship finals through the regular season. In an exciting match series, which ended 3-2 in favor of AEK, the club was crowned champion for the fifth time.

In April 2025, AEK handball club lifted its fifth Greek handball cup winning ESN Vrilissia by a score of 43-21 in SUNEL Arena at Athens.

== Kits ==
HOME
2019–20	2021–

AWAY
2018–19	2020–

== Honours ==
AEK H.C. honours aek.gr
Type	Competition	Titles	Winners	Runners-up	Third place
Continental	EHF European Cup	1	2020–21	2017–18, 2024–25	2018–19
Domestic	Greek Handball Championship	5	2010–11, 2012–13, 2019–20, 2020–21, 2022–23	2012, 2014, 2018, 2019, 2022, 2024, 2025, 2026	
Domestic	Greek Handball Cup	5	2008–09, 2012–13, 2013–14, 2020–21, 2024–25	2011, 2012, 2015, 2019, ~~2020~~, 2022, 2026	
Domestic	Greek Handball Super Cup	0		2023, 2025, 2026	

- record
- ^{S} Shared record

=== Tournaments ===
- Official Tournaments
  - 47th International Handball Tournament Struga (1): 2019
  - International Tournament "Andreas Papastamatis" (4): 2020, 2021, 2022, 2023

=== Unofficial team awards ===
- European Treble (HHF League and Cup, and EHF Cup)
  - Winners (1): 2020–21
- National Double (HHF League and Cup)
  - Winners (2): 2012–13, 2020–21

== Performance in international competitions ==
Season	Achievement	Notes
EHF Challenge Cup \ European Cup
2010–11	Quarter-finals	lost on aggregate by RK Partizan Beograd, 28–22 (L) in Belgrade and 23–24 (L) in Athens
2017–18	Runners-up	lost on aggregate by AHC Potaissa Turda, 27–26 (W) in Athens and 33–22 (L) in Cluj-Napoca
2018–19	Semi-finals	eliminated on aggregate by Madeira Andebol SAD, 22–30 (L) in Athens and 27–22 (L) in Madeira
2019–20	Quarter-finals	drawn against AHC Potaissa Turda but cancelled due to COVID-19 pandemic
2020–21	Champions	defeated Ystads IF on aggregate, 30–26 (W) and 20–24 (W) in the finals at Chalcis
2024–25	Runners-up	lost on aggregate by RK Alkaloid, 25–29 (L) in Athens and 10–0 (L) (by forfeit) in Skopje

== The European Cup glory paths ==
2017–18 EHF Challenge Cup

Round	Team	Home	Away	Aggregate	Qual.
R3	(United Kingdom) London GD	41–21	16–40	81–37	
L16	(Turkey) Göztepe SK	32–23	29–25	57–52	
QF	(Luxembourg) Berchem HC	32–25	18–32	64–43	
SF	(Portugal) AM Madeira Andebol SAD	23–23	21–29	52–44	
F	(Romania) AHC Potaissa Turda	27–26	33–22	49–59	

2020–21 EHF European Cup

Round	Team	Home	Away	Aggregate	Qual.
R3	(Kosovo) KH Prishtina	37–19	8–41	78–25	
L16	(Romania) CSM București	29–23	28–23	52–51	
QF	(Russia) HC Neva SPb	29–27	21–30	59–48	
SF	(Slovenia) RK Gorenje	31–29	31–31	62–60	
F	(Sweden) Ystads IF	30–26	20–24	54–46	

2024–25 EHF European Cup

Round	Team	Home	Away	Aggregate	Qual.
R2	(Italy) Junior Fasano	39–26	20–38	77–46	
R3	(Montenegro) RK Lovćen	45–26	31–41	86–57	
L16	(Slovenia) MRK Krka	38–28	25–31	69–53	
QF	(Serbia) RK Partizan AdmiralBet	27–22	30–26	53–52	
SF	(Bosnia and Herzegovina) RK Izviđač	37–28	28–24	61–56	
F	(North Macedonia) RK Alkaloid	25–29	10–0	25–39	

== European competitions record ==
Competitions		Appearances	Played	W	D	L	GF \ GA
1	EHF Champions League	2	4	1	0	3	103–121
2	EHF European League/EHF Cup	6	24	6	0	18	625–703
2	EHF Cup Winners' Cup	1	2	0	1	1	46–51
3	EHF European Cup/EHF Ch.Cup	8	56	36	3	17	1,656–1,413
Overall		17	86	43	4	39	2,430–2,288

Last updated: 5 June 2025.
Source: history.eurohandball.com

== EHF ranking ==
As of 7 May 2025

Rank	Team	Points
33	(North Macedonia) RK Eurofarm Pelister	154
34	(France) Fenix Toulouse	150
35	(Greece) AEK Athens	149
36	(Norway) Kolstad Håndball	149
37	(Slovenia) RK Gorenje Velenje	148

Last updated: 3 May 2025.
Source: eurotopteam.com

== Season by season ==
Season	Division	Place	Cup	Super Cup	Europe
2005–06	A1 Ethniki	8th	–	–	–
2006–07	A1 Ethniki	3rd	–	–	–
2007–08	A1 Ethniki	8th	–	–	EHF Cup R2
2008–09	A1 Ethniki	7th	Winner	–	–
2009–10	A1 Ethniki	4th	Final-4	–	EHF Cup R3
2010–11	A1 Ethniki	1st	Finalist	–	EHF Challenge Cup QF
2011–12	A1 Ethniki	2nd	Finalist	–	EHF Champions League QS; EHF Cup R2
2012–13	A1 Ethniki	1st	Winner	–	EHF Cup R1
2013–14	A1 Ethniki	2nd	Winner	–	EHF Champions League QS; EHF Cup R3
2014–15	A1 Ethniki	3rd	Finalist	–	–
2015–16	Handball Premier	9th	–	–	EHF Challenge Cup R3
2016–17	Handball Premier	3rd	–	–	–
2017–18	Handball Premier	2nd	–	–	EHF Challenge Cup Finalist
2018–19	Handball Premier	2nd	Finalist	–	EHF Challenge Cup SF
2019–20	Handball Premier	1st	~~Final~~	–	~~EHF Challenge Cup QF~~
2020–21	Handball Premier	1st	Winner	–	EHF European Cup Winner
2021–22	Handball Premier	2nd	Finalist	–	EHF European League GS
2022–23	Handball Premier	1st	Final-4	–	EHF European Cup
2023–24	Handball Premier	2nd	–	Finalist	EHF European League GS
2024–25	Handball Premier	2nd	Winner	–	EHF European Cup Finalist
2025–26	Handball Premier	2nd	Finalist	Finalist	–
2026-27	Handball Premier	–	–	Finalist	–

- In the 2019–20 season, the Greek Cup final against Diomidis Argous and the EHF Challenge Cup quarterfinal against Potaissa Turda were canceled due to COVID-19 pandemic.

== Players ==
Squad for the 2026–27 season

Goalkeepers

- 16 (Greece) Giannis Antoniadis
- 65 (Brazil) Matheus de Souza Albuquerque
- – (France) Jérôme Ribet
- – (Norway) Øyvind Varpe

Wingers
LW

- 10 (Greece) Lefteris Mpoutos
- 18 (Brazil) Guilherme Torriani
- 34 (Senegal) Souleimany Toure

RW

- 2 (Greece) Evangelos Arampatzis (c)
- 15 (Brazil) Vinicius Perin

Line players

- 19 (Greece) Giorgos Georgiadis
- 35 (Brazil) Guilherme Peixoto
- 40 (Germany) Jonas Stüber
- – (Algeria) Abdeldjalil Zennadi
- – (Angola) Patrício Chicola

Back players
LB

- 14 (Serbia) Ognjen Radojičić
- 25 (France) Dylan Garain
- – (Spain) Carlos Ocaña Matas

CB

- 5 (Greece) Thomas Xypnitos
- 11 (Greece) Dimitrios Panagiotou
- 13 (Brazil) Denys Alessandro Da Silva Barros
- – (Croatia) Jan Kovačec
- – (Japan) Hiroki Matsuoka
- – (Croatia) Rudolf Zvonimir Šafranko

RB

- 22 (Greece) Alexandros Koukoulas
- 31 (Greece) Giorgos Kolovos
- – (Brazil) Guilherme Linhares de Souza

=== Transfers ===
Transfers for the 2026–27 season

Joining

- (Algeria) Abdeldjalil Zennadi (LP) from (Hungary) Carbonex-Komló
- (Croatia) Filip Vistorop (CB) from (Germany) HSG Wetzlar
- (Croatia) Jan Kovačec (CB) from (Austria) Jags Vöslau
- (Croatia) Rudolf Šafranko (CB) from (Austria) UHC Hollabrunn
- (Angola) Patrício Chicola (LP) from (Portugal) Póvoa AC
- (Spain) Carlos Ocaña (LB) from (Spain) CB Caserío Ciudad Real
- (Brazil) Guilherme Linhares (RB) from (Spain) CB Caserío Ciudad Real
- (Greece) Konstantinos Kotanidis (GK) from (Spain) CB Caserío Ciudad Real
- (Japan) Hiroki Matsuoka (CB) from Free agent

Leaving

- (France) Adama Keïta (LW) to (North Macedonia) GRK Ohrid
- (Egypt) Omar Salem (CB) to (Spain) CB Caserío Ciudad Real
- (Serbia) Ognjen Radojičić (LB) to (Czech Republic) Talent Plzeň

=== Transfer history ===
Transfers for the 2025–26 season

Joining

- (Iceland) Grétar Guðjónsson (GK) from (France) US Ivry Handball
- (Germany) Julius Kühn (LB) from (Germany) SG BBM Bietigheim
- (Germany) Jonas Stüber (LP) from (Germany) ASV Hamm-Westfalen
- (Egypt) Omar Salem (CB) from (Greece) AC Diomidis Argous
- (Serbia) Ognjen Radojičić (LB) from (North Macedonia) MRK Kumanovo

Leaving

- (Norway) Mario Matic (CB) to (Norway) Elverum Håndball
- (France) Adama Sako (LB) to (Romania) CSM Constanța
- (Croatia) Petar Lulić (LP) to (Croatia) MRK Sesvete

== Team officials ==
Staff for the 2025–26 season

Pos.	Name
General Manager	(Greece) Efstathios Papachartofylis
Team Manager	(Greece) Ioannis Antalis
Head coach	(Greece) Alexandros Alvanos
Assistant coach	(Portugal) Rafa Ribeiro
Goalkeeper coach	(Greece) Evangelos Raspitsos
Personal trainer	(Greece) Georgios Vavetsis
Physiotherapist	(Greece) Stylianos Lekkas

== Notable former and current coaches ==
Greece

- Giannis Arvanitis
- Dimitris Dimitroulias
- Kostas Toutsis
- Nikos Grammatikos (2017–19)
- Dimitris Dimitroulias (2019–22)
- Alexandros Alvanos (2022–23)

Rest of Europe

- Dragan Đukić (2023)
- Frédéric Bougeant (2024–25)
- Rui Silva (2025–26)

== List of former and current players ==
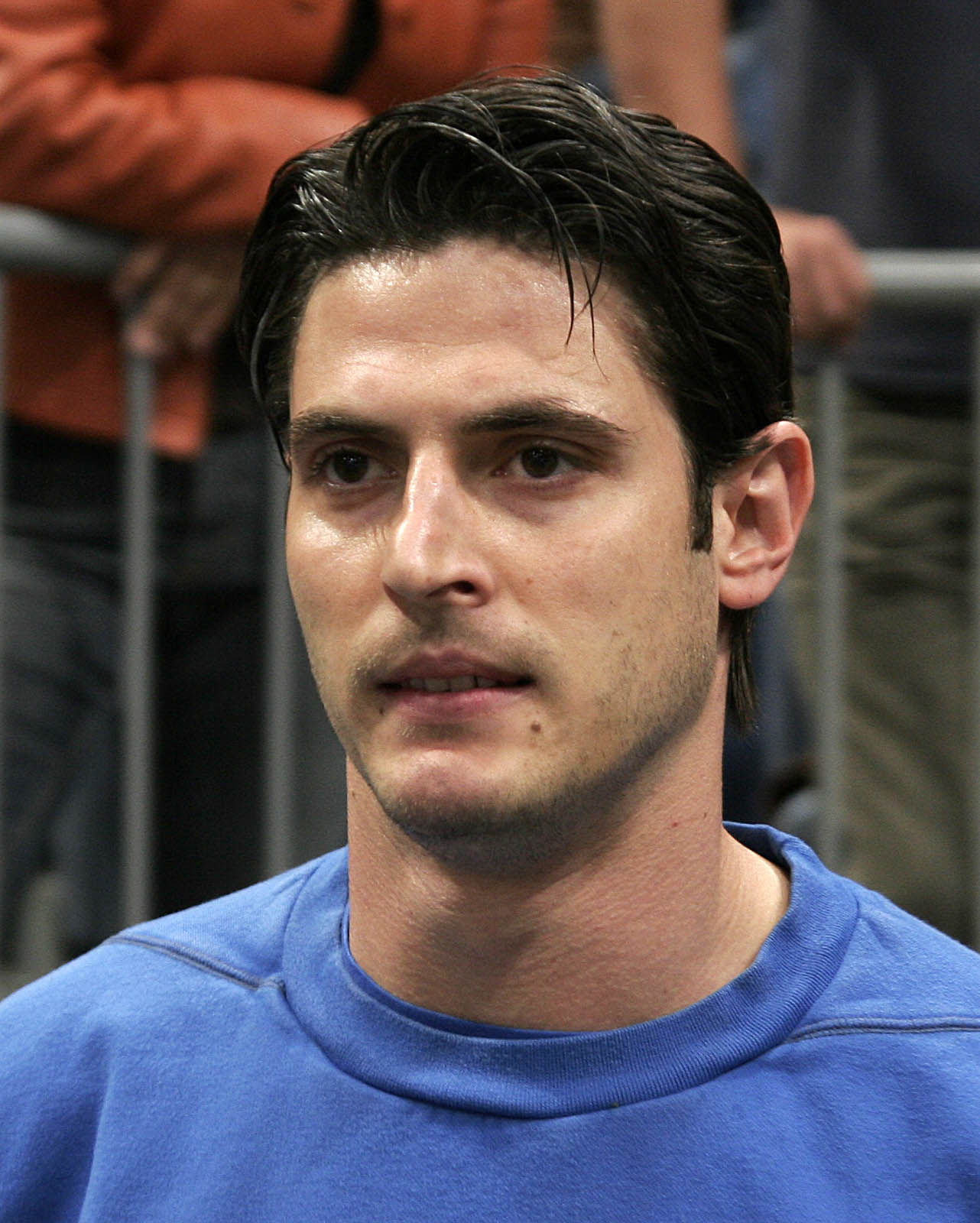
Alexandros Alvanos

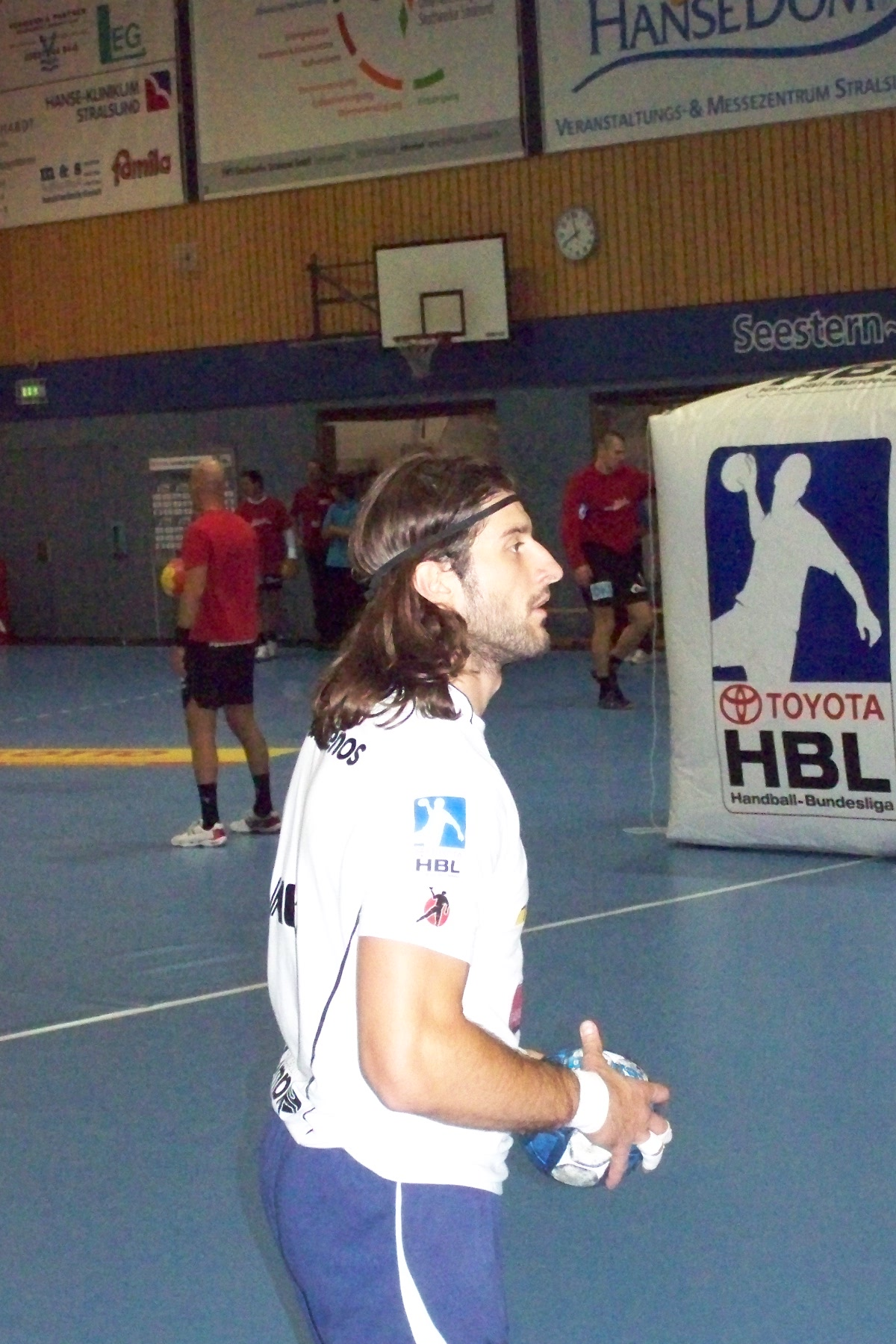
Spyros Balomenos

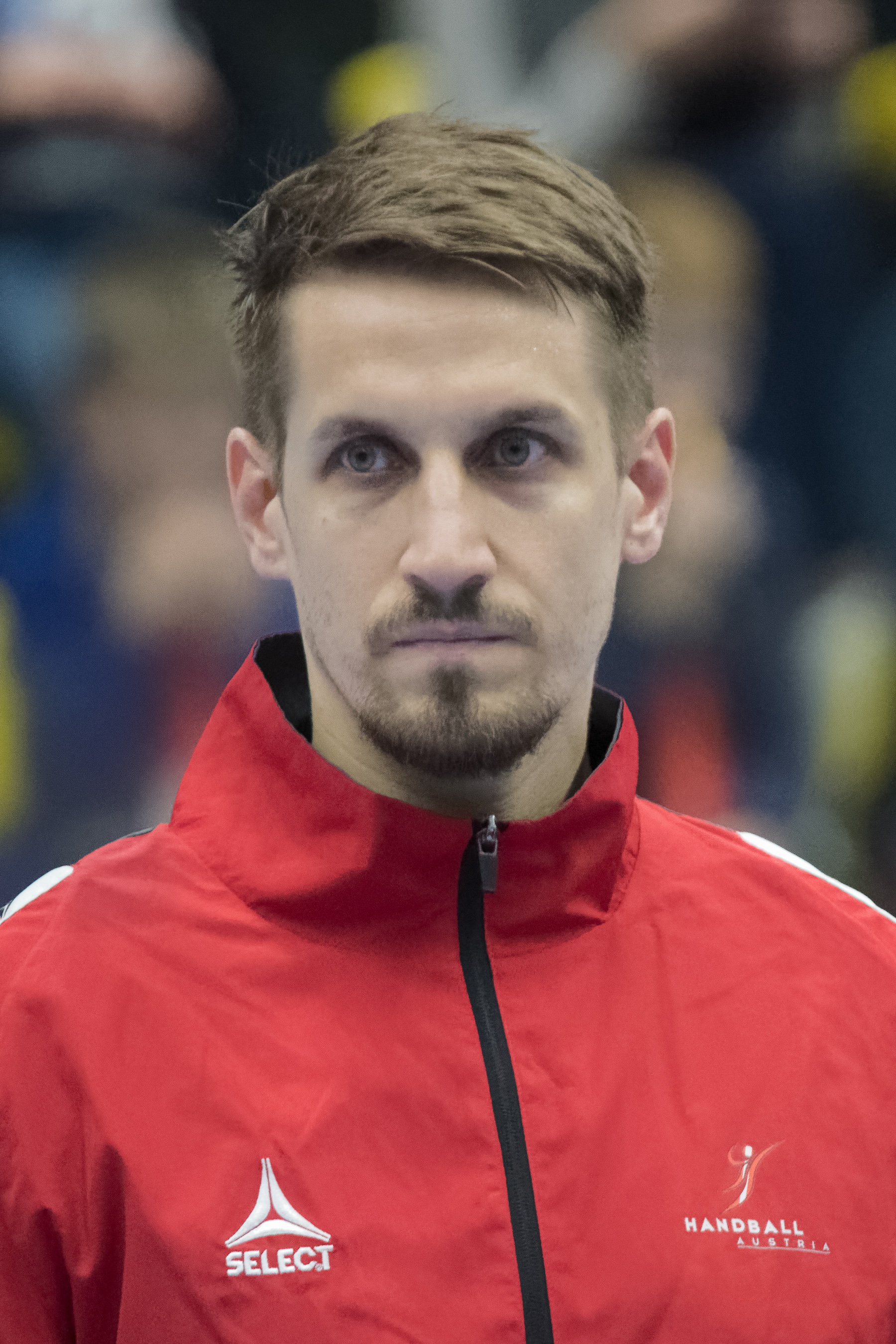
Thomas Bauer

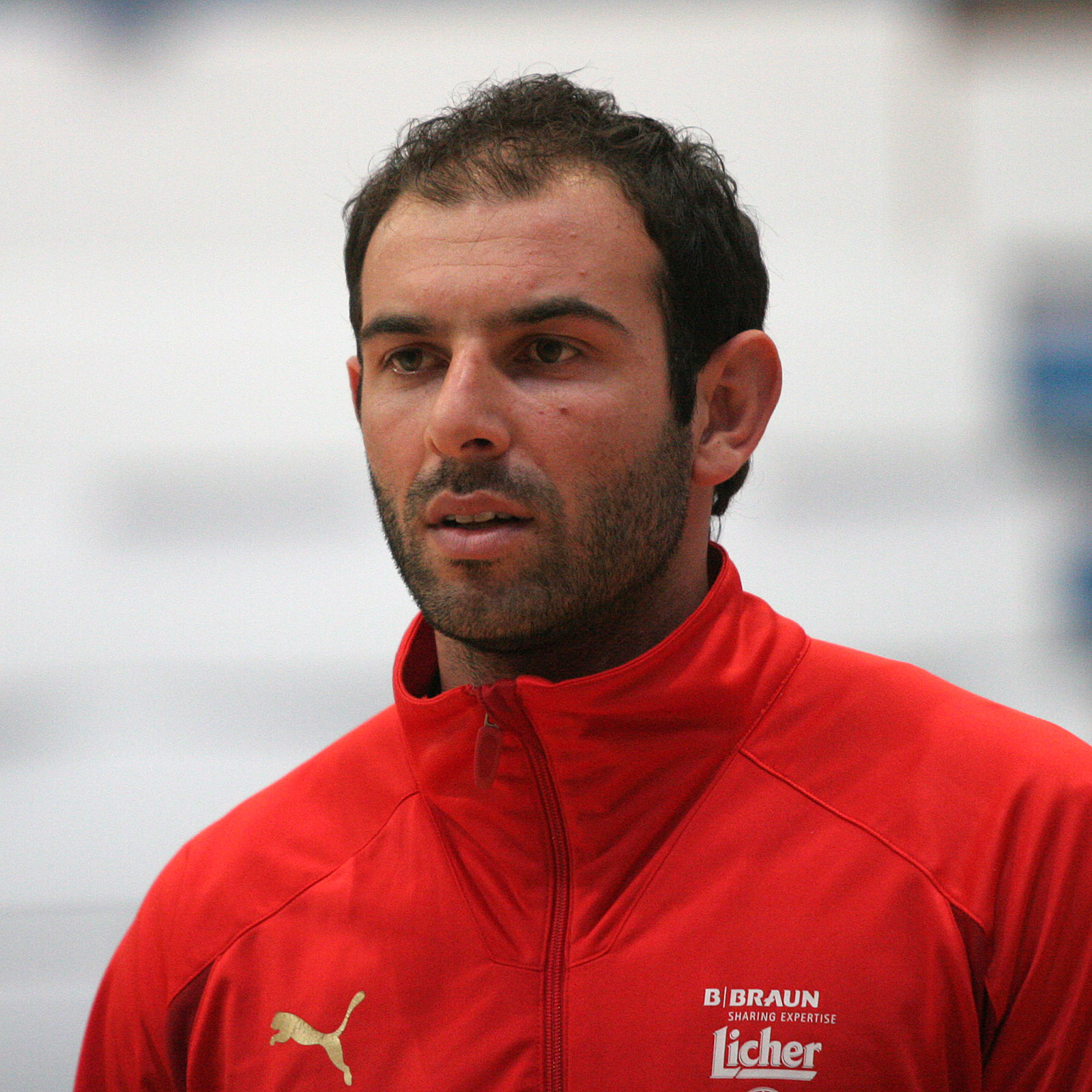
Savvas Karypidis

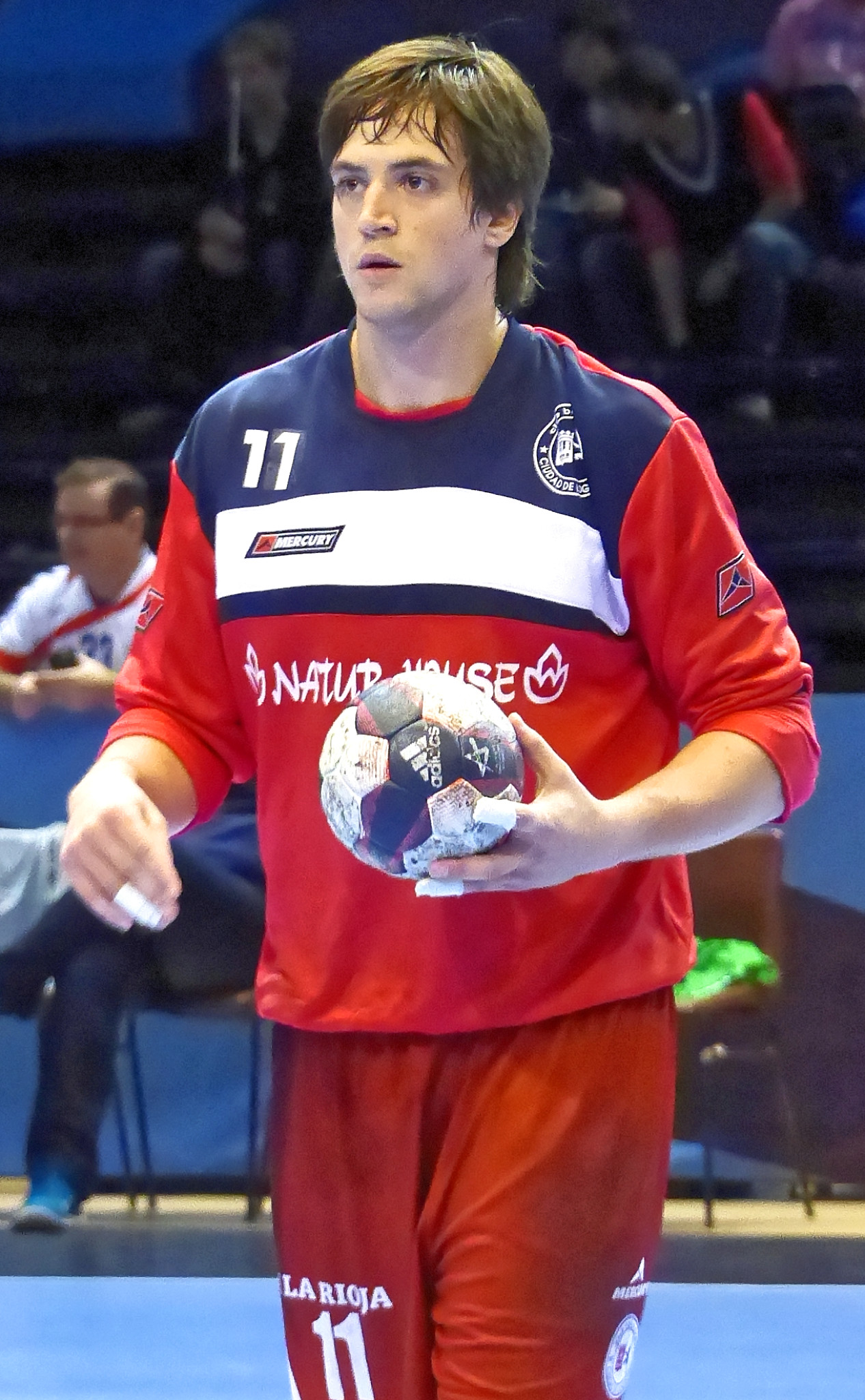
Luis Felipe Reina

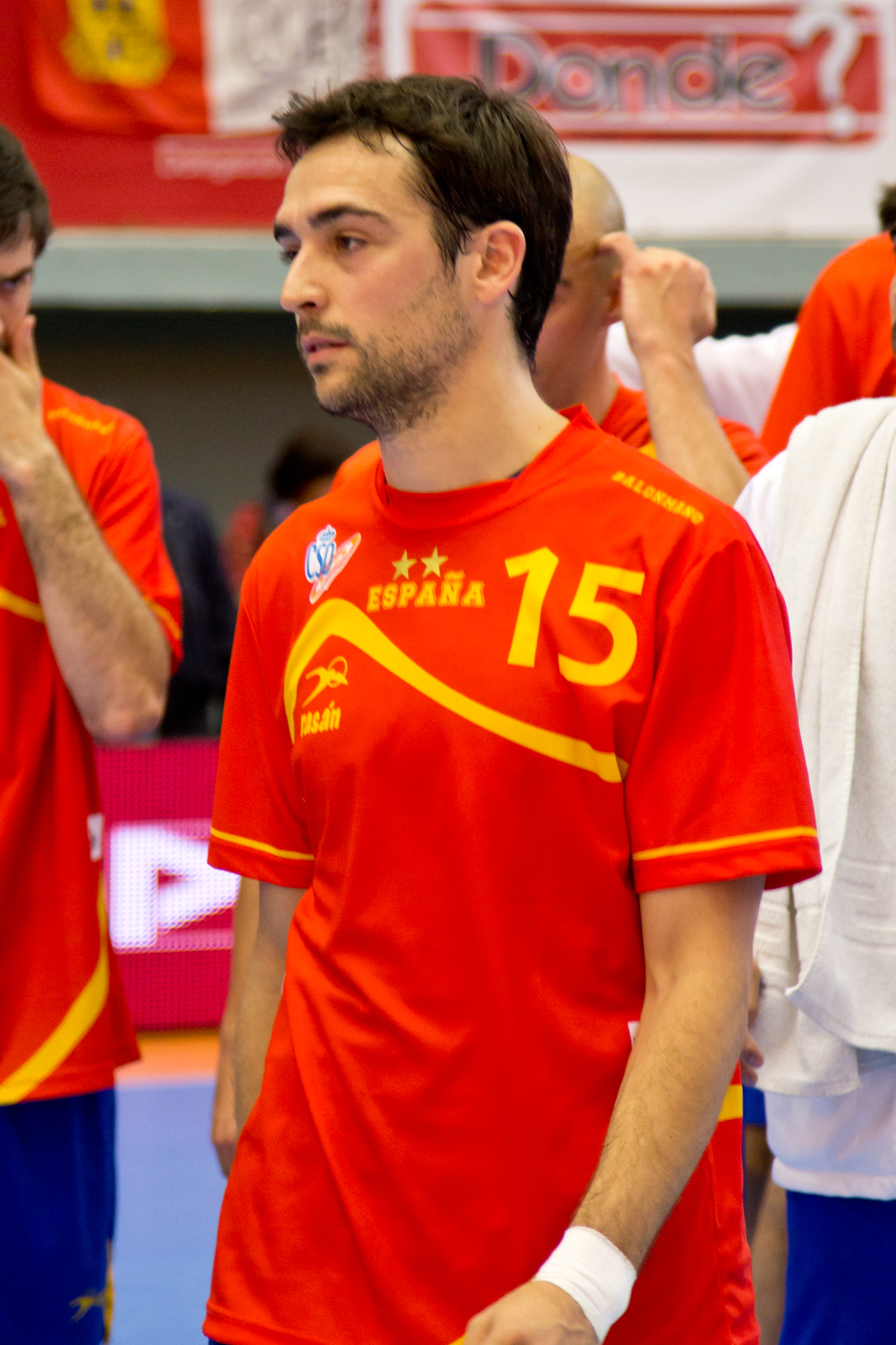
Cristian Ugalde

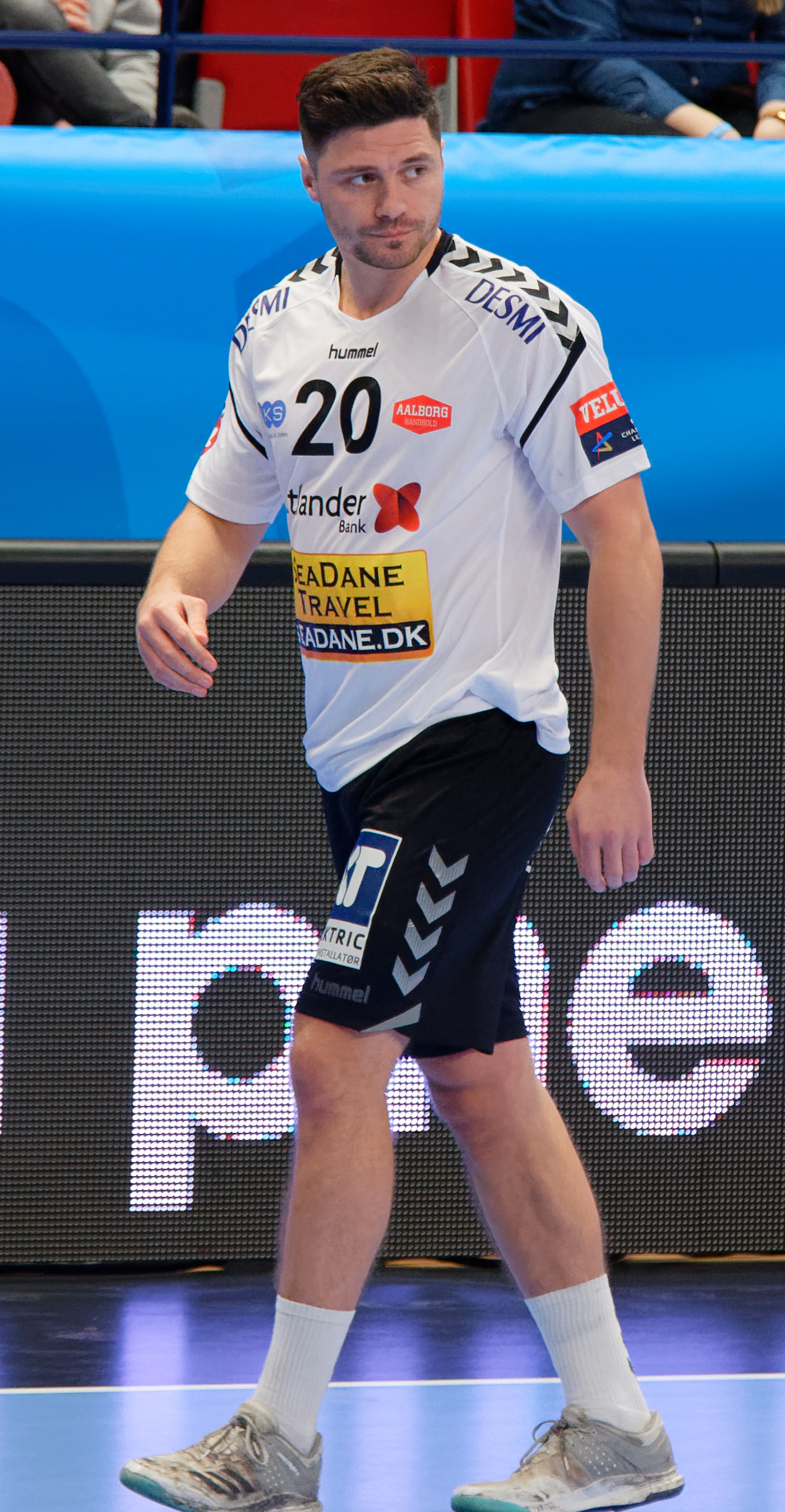
Jesper Meinby

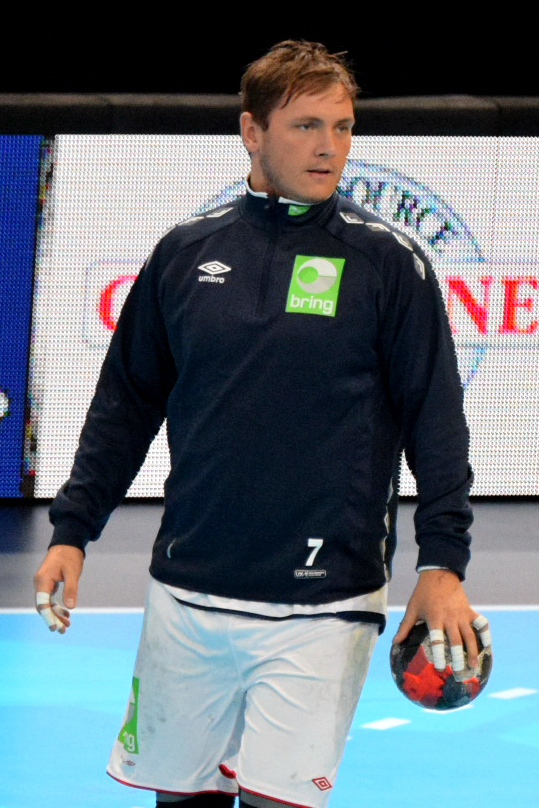
Joakim Hykkerud

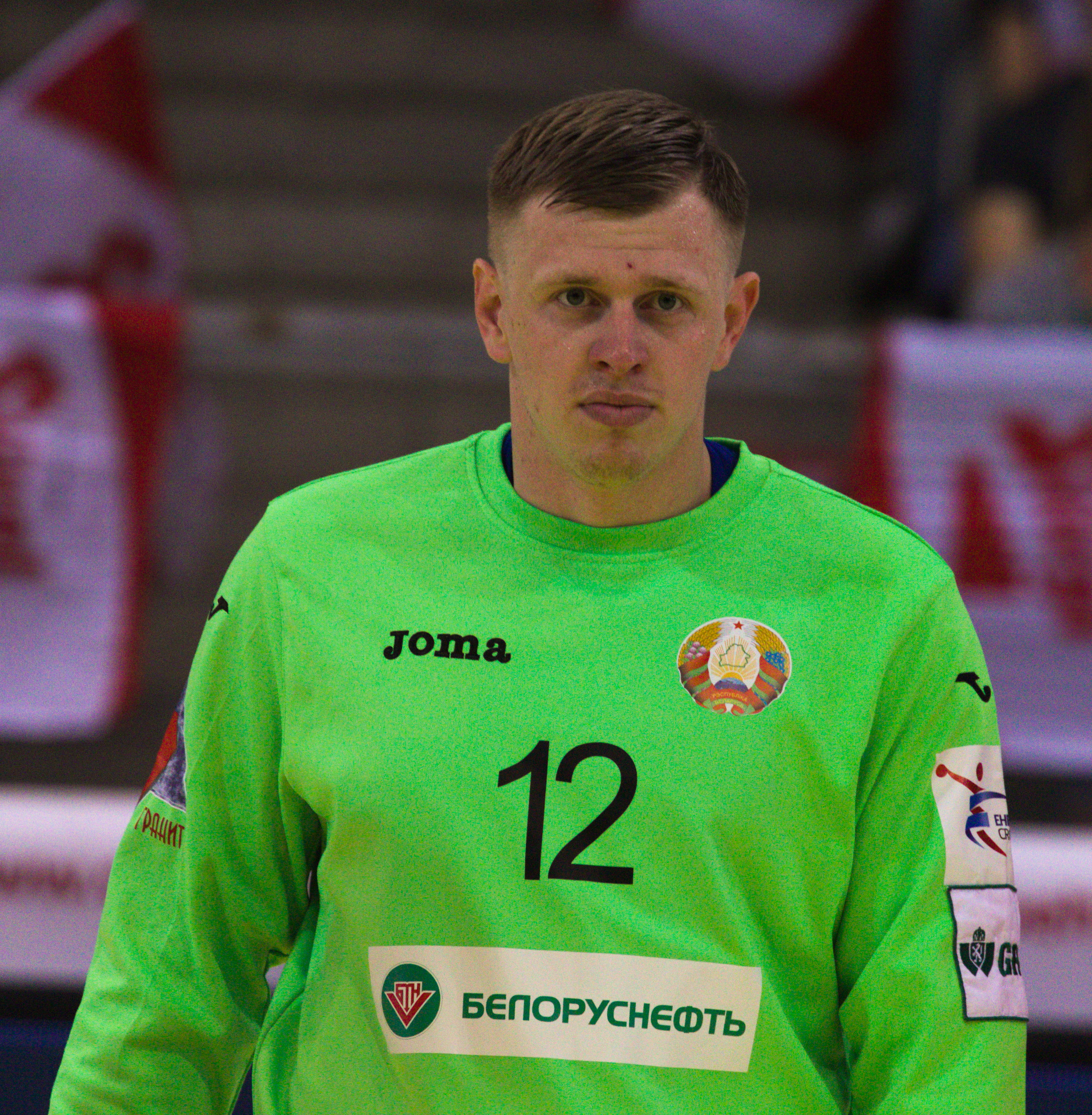
Ivan Matskevich

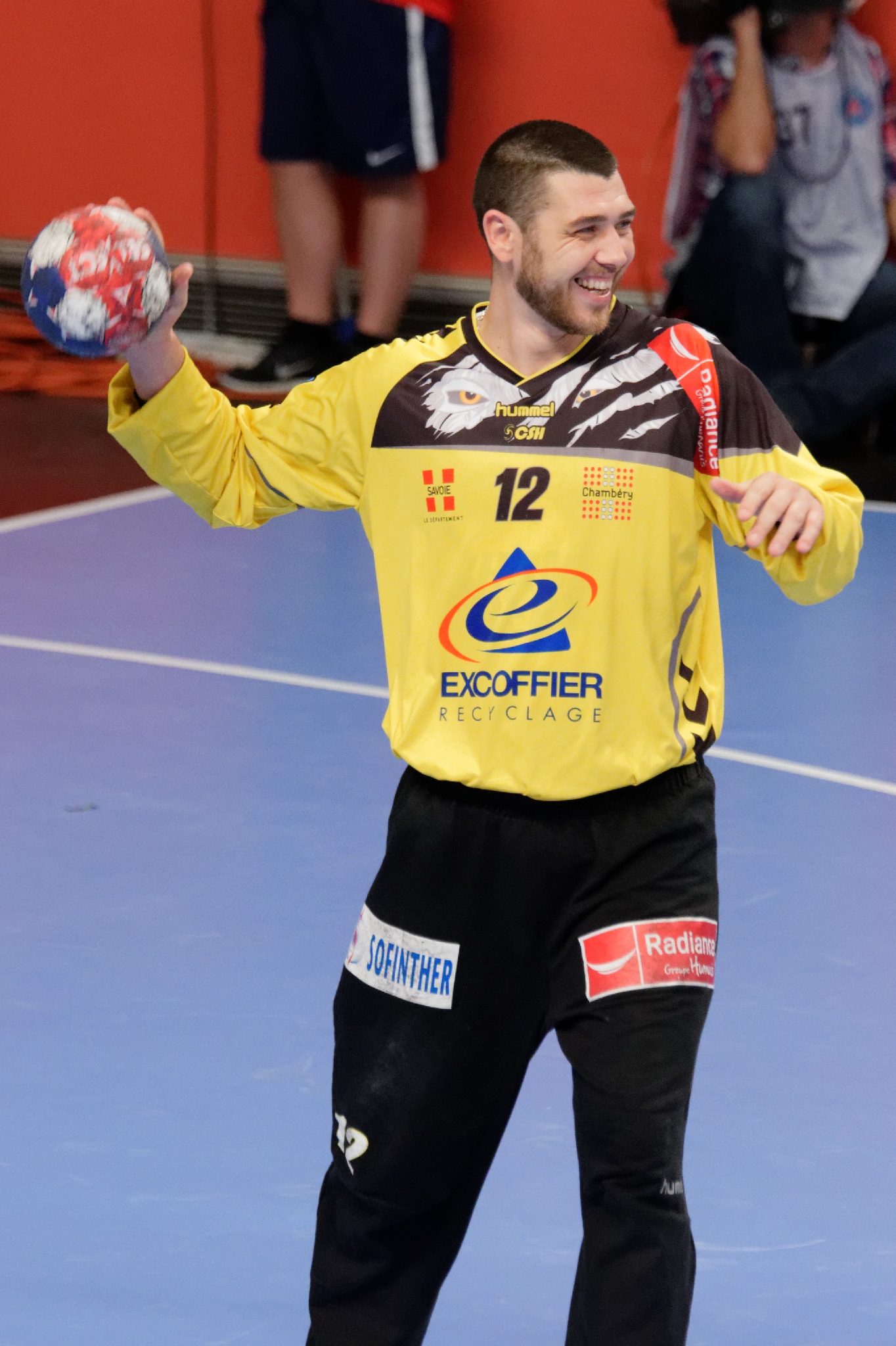
Yann Genty

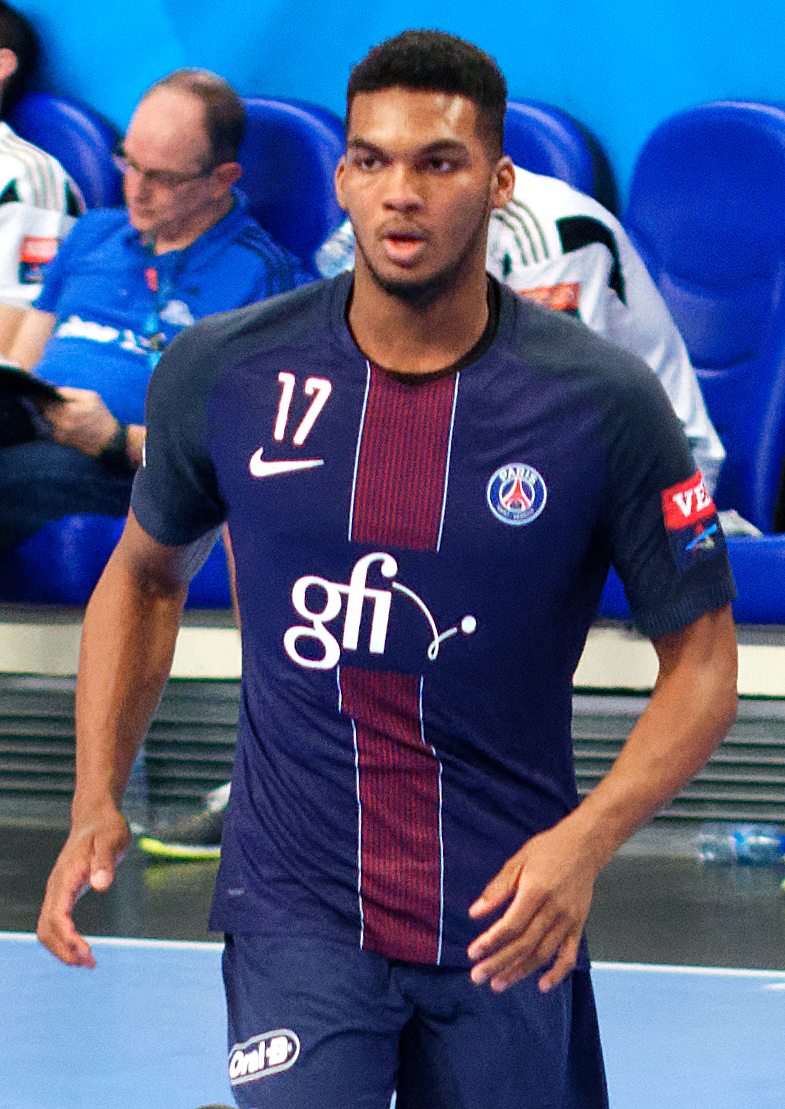
Dylan Garain

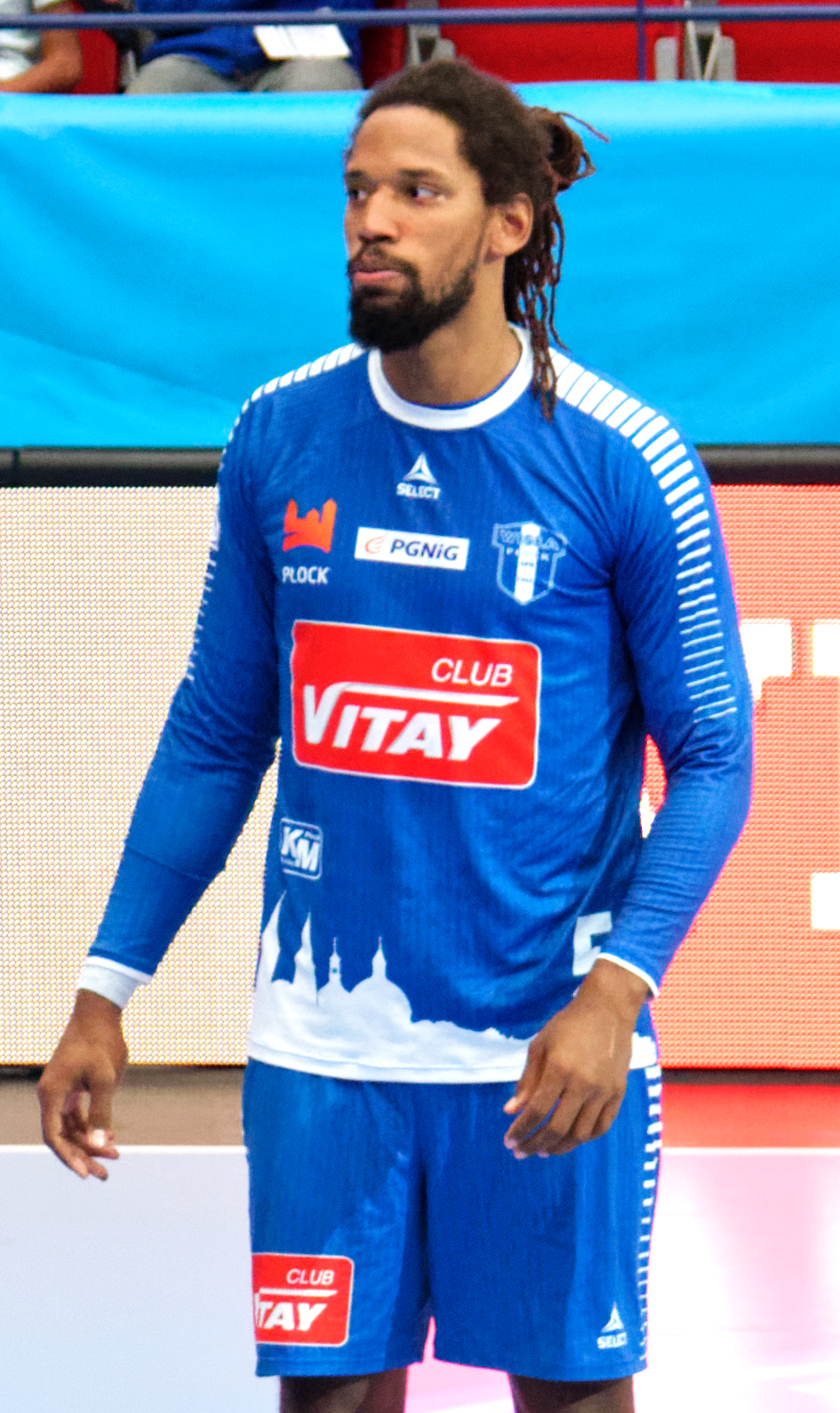
Gilberto Duarte

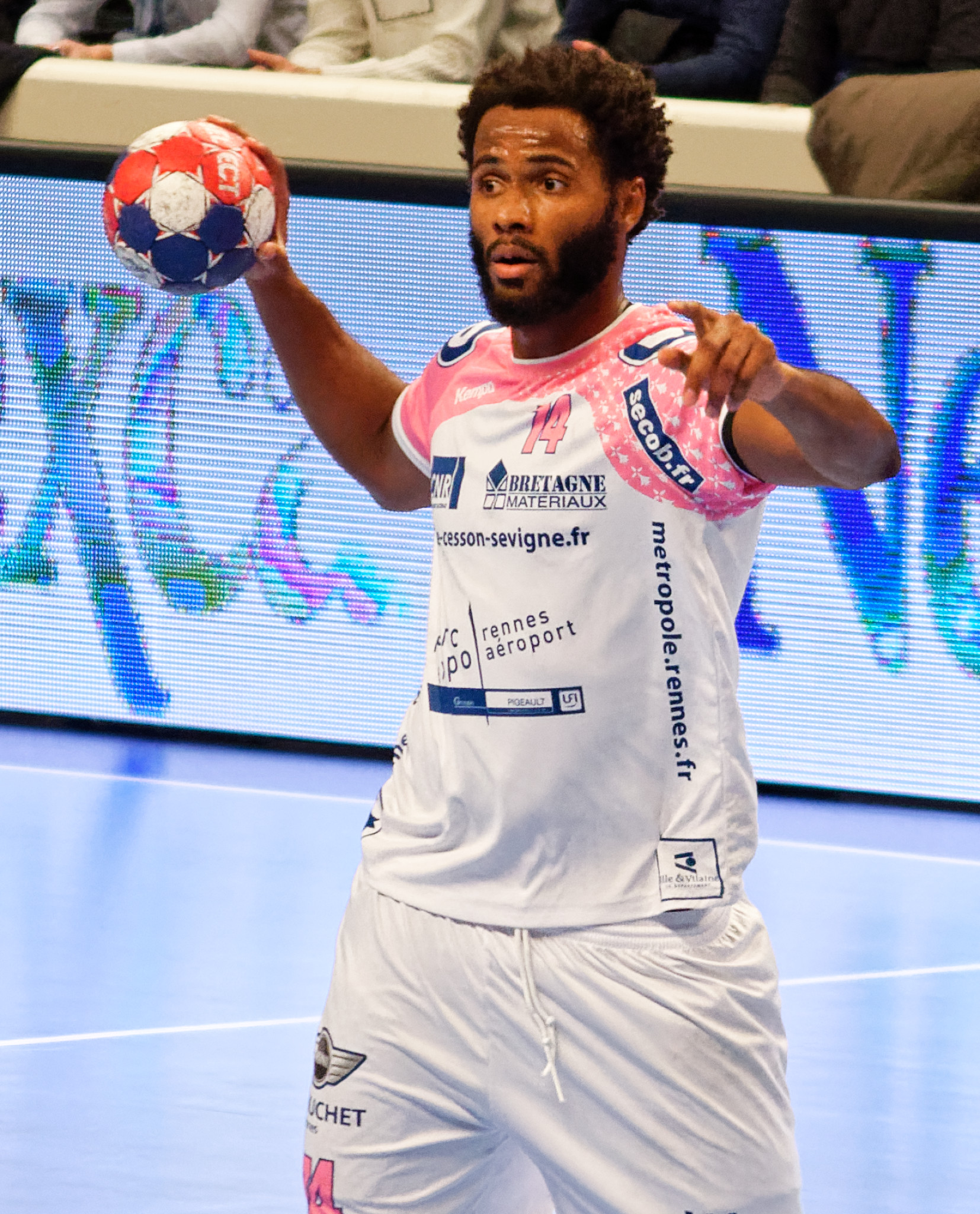
Wilson Davyes

Greece

- (Greece) Christoforos Bakaoukas (2005–16)
- (Greece) Savvas Karypidis (2013–15)
- (Greece) Fanis Tsaousis (2005–15)
- (Greece) Giorgos Papadopoulos
- (Greece) Dimitris Kaffatos (2005–07, 2009–14, 2019–20)
- (Greece) Dionysis Georgiadis (2010–20)
- (Greece) Giorgos Perros
- (Greece) Alexandros Alvanos (2012–14, 2018–19)
- (Greece) Spyros Balomenos (2012–13)
- (Greece) Panagiotis Nikolaidis
- (Greece) Konstantinos Tsilimparis (2013–15)
- (Greece) Grigoris Sanikis (2013–15)
- (Greece) Nikolaos Kritikos (2023–24)
- (Greece) Vyron Papadopoulos (2023–24)
- (Greece) Charalampos Mallios (2023–24)

Rest of Europe

- (Austria) Thomas Bauer (2020–21)
- (Austria) Nikola Stevanovic (2022)
- (Belarus) Ivan Matskevich (2022–23)
- (Bosnia and Herzegovina) Tomislav Nuić (2021)
- (Croatia) Marin Buneta (2019–21)
- (Croatia) Stipe Mandalinić (2022–24)
- (Croatia) Nikola Jukić (2022–23)
- (Croatia) Patrik Martinović (2023–24)
- (Croatia) Petar Lulić (2024–25)
- (Croatia) Šime Ivić (2025–26)
- (Croatia) Rudolf Zvonimir Šafranko (2026–)
- (Croatia) Jan Kovačec (2026–)
- (Denmark) Lars Jacobsen (2018–20)
- (Denmark) Jesper Meinby (2021)
- (Denmark) Viktor Vlastos (2024–25)
- (France) Celym Darsoulant (2018–19)
- (France) Malik Hoggas (2019–20)
- (France) Maximilien Tike (2022–23, 2024)
- (France) Yann Genty (2024–25)
- (France) Adama Sako (2024–25)
- (France) Jonathan Azorin (2022–23)
- (France) Adama Keïta (2024–25)
- (France) Dylan Garain (2024–)
- (France) Lukas Szukielowicz (2024–25)
- (France) Arthur Muller (2024–25)
- (France) Jerome Ribet (2026–)
- (Germany) Erik Schmidt (2024–26)
- (Germany) Julius Kühn (2025–26)
- (Germany) Jonas Stuber (2025–)
- (Hungary) Gergö Rózsavölgyi (2019)
- (Iceland) Grétar Guðjónsson (2025)
- (Lithuania) Laurynas Palevicius (2018–19)
- (Montenegro) Mladen Rakčević (2013–14)
- (Montenegro) Goran Andjelic (2021–22)
- (Montenegro) Radojica Čepić (2023)
- (Norway) Joakim Hykkerud (2021)
- (Norway) Elias Schaaning Thome (2023–24)
- (Norway) Mario Matic (2024–25)
- (Norway) Øyvind Varpe (2026–)
- (Poland) Łukasz Rogulski (2022–23)
- (Poland) Krzysztof Komarzewski (2023)
- (Portugal) Gilberto Duarte (2024–25)
- (Portugal) Wilson Davyes (2024–25)
- (Romania) Bogdan Criciotoiu (2020)
- (Serbia) Radule Radulovic (2017–19)
- (Serbia) Milan Kosanović (2019–21)
- (Serbia) Miljan Manić
- (Serbia) Mirko Lukić
- (Serbia) Zlatko Šuša
- (Serbia) Eldin Vražalica
- (Serbia) Igor Arsic (2019–20)
- (Serbia) Nemanja Živković (2022–23)
- (Serbia) Đorđe Golubović (2023)
- (Serbia) Ognjen Radojičić (2026–)
- (Slovakia) Maros Balaz (2018–19)
- (Slovakia) Juraj Briatka (2021–22)
- (Slovenia) Igor Žabić (2023)
- (Spain) Luis Felipe Jiménez Reina (2020–21)
- (Spain) Ignacio Plaza Jiménez (2019–22)
- (Spain) Cristian Ugalde (2020–22)
- (Spain) Ignacio Moya Florido (2020–23)
- (Spain) Carlos Ocaña Matas (2026–)
- (Sweden) Philip Jonsson (2023–24)
- (Ukraine) Olexandr Shevelev (2022)

Africa

- (Algeria) Abderrahim Berriah (2021–22)
- (Algeria) Sofiane Bendjilali (2021–22)
- (Algeria) Abdeldjalil Zennadi (2026–)
- (Angola) Cláudio Chicola (2026–)
- (Democratic Republic of the Congo) Aurélien Tchitombi (2022–23)
- (Democratic Republic of the Congo) Frédéric Beauregard (2024–25)
- (Egypt) Omar Salem (2024, 2025–26)
- (Senegal) Souleimany Toure (2024–)
- (Tunisia) Anis Gatfi (2015–16)
- (Tunisia) Mohamed Amine Ben Cheikh (2024–25)

Americas

- (Brazil) Patrick Andre Toniazzo Lemos (2020–24)
- (Brazil) Leonardo Domenech de Almeida (2022–23)
- (Brazil) Denys Alessandro Da Silva Barros (2026–)
- (Brazil) Guilherme Peixoto (2026–)
- (Brazil) Matheus de Souza Albuquerque (2026–)
- (Brazil) Vinicius Perin (2026–)
- (Brazil) Guilherme Torriani (2026–)
- (Brazil) Guilherme Linhares de Souza (2026–)

Asia

- (Cyprus) Ioulios Argyrou (2018–19)
- (Israel) Dan Tepper (2024–25)
- (Japan) Hiroki Matsuoka (2026–)
- (Turkey) Yunus Özmusul (2019)

== Presidential history ==
Period	Name
2005–2006	(Greece) Costas Stamatiadis
2006–2009	(Greece) Nikos Georgantzoglou
2009–2011	(Greece) Dimitris Chatzichristos
2011–2012	(Greece) Costas Papadimitriou
2012–2014	(Greece) Dimitris Lazopoulos
2014–2016	(Greece) Alexis Alexiou
2016–2026	(Greece) Stamatis Papastamatis
2026–	(Greece) Nikos Pantermalis
