= 2017–18 Greek Handball Premier =

Handball Premier
- Season: 2017–18
- Champions: Olympiacos
- Relegated: Aris Nikaias; AESX Pylaia
- Top goalscorer: (Greece) Evgenios Toungkelidis; 178
- Biggest home win: OSFP/Omilos Xini 40–17 Panellinios
- Biggest away win: Panellinios 14–37 A.E.K.
- Highest scoring: A.E.K. 48–27 Aeropos Edessa; Play off 8

The 2017–18 Greek Handball Premier is the 39th season of the Greek Handball Premier, Greece's premier handball league. Olympiacos were crowned champions, after beating AEK Athens with 3–2 wins in the finals, overturning an initial 0–2 win lead by AEK and taking three straight wins to secure the title.

== Teams ==
Location of teams in Greek Handball Championship 2017–18

A total of 12 teams will participate in this year's edition of the Handball Premier. Of these, 10 sides qualified directly from the 2016–17 season and the play-off winners from each of the two groups of A2 Ethniki were promoted: GAS Kamatero from Group A (for the first time in their history) and XANTH from Group B.

Team	Location
AEK	Athens
Aeropos Edessa	Edessa
Diomidis Argous	Argos
ASE Douka	Maroussi, Athens
GS Drama 86	Drama
Filippos Veria	Veria
Foivos Sykeon	Sykies, Thessaloniki
GAS Kamatero	Kamatero, Athens
Olympiacos	Piraeus, Athens
Panellinios	Athens
PAOK	Thessaloniki
XANTH	Thessaloniki

== Regular season ==
=== League table ===
Pos	Team	Pld	W	D	L	GF	GA	GD	Pts	Qualification or relegation
1	Olympiacos / Omilos Xini (C)	22	19	2	1	653	458	+195	40	Qualification to Championship semi-finals
2	PAOK Vergina TV	22	19	1	2	641	453	+188	39	Qualification to Championship semi-finals
3	AEK	22	17	1	4	645	460	+185	35	Qualification to Championship Semi-finals qualifiers
4	ASE Douka	22	15	1	6	596	493	+103	31	Qualification to Championship Semi-finals qualifiers
5	Diomidis Argous	22	15	0	7	547	476	+71	30	Qualification to Championship Semi-finals qualifiers
6	Aeropos Edessa	22	10	3	9	570	597	−27	23	Qualification to Championship Semi-finals qualifiers
7	Filippos Veria	22	11	0	11	547	527	+20	22	
8	XANTH	22	5	4	13	522	647	−125	14	
9	PAS Foivos Sykeon	22	5	2	15	476	601	−125	12	Participation in Relegation play-outs
10	GAS Kamatero (R)	22	4	3	15	450	553	−103	11	Participation in Relegation play-outs
11	GS Drama 86	22	2	3	17	531	664	−133	7	Participation in Relegation play-outs
12	Panellinios GS (R)	22	0	0	22	420	669	−249	0	Participation in Relegation play-outs

First match(es) will be played: unknown. Source: Hellenic Handball Federation
(C) Champions; (R) Relegated

=== Results ===
Home \ Away	AEK	AER	DIO	DOU	DRA	FIL	FOI	KAM	OLY	PAN	PAO	XAN
AEK	—											
Aeropos Edessa		—										
Diomidis Argous			—									
ASE Douka				—								
GS Drama 86					—							
Filippos Veria						—						
Foivos Sykeon							—					
GAS Kamatero								—				
Olympiacos									—			
Panellinios										—		
PAOK											—	
XANTH												—

First match(es) will be played: unknown. Source: Hellenic Handball Federation
Legend: Blue = home team win; Yellow = draw; Red = away team win.
For upcoming matches, an "a" indicates there is an article about the rivalry between the two participants.

== Semi-finals qualifiers ==
In the semifinals qualifiers, the teams that finished in places 3 to 6 of the regular season play against each other (the 3rd team of the regular season faces the 6th, while the 4th team faces the 5th) and have to win two games to win the series. Thus, if one team wins two games before all three games have been played, the remaining game is omitted. The team that finished in the higher regular season place, plays the first and the third (if necessary) game of the series at home. The two winners proceed to the championship semi-finals.

Team 3	Agg.	Team 6	Game1	Game 2	Game 3
AEK	2–1	Aeropos Edessas	48–27	23–25	29–16

Team 4	Agg.	Team 5	Game 1	Game 2	Game 3
ASE Douka	2–1	Diomidis Argous	24–21	18–28	27–24

== Semi-finals ==
In the championship semi-finals, the top two teams of the regular season plus the two teams that qualified from the semifinal qualifiers play against each other and have to win two games to win the series. Thus, if one team wins two games before all three games have been played, the remaining game is omitted. The teams that directly qualified to the semifinals from the regular season play the first and the third (if necessary) game of the series at home. The two winners proceed to the championship finals.

Team 1	Agg.	Team 4	Game 1	Game 2
Olympiacos	2–0	ASE Douka	23–20	29–24

Team 2	Agg.	Team 3	Game 1	Game 2
PAOK	0–2	AEK	20–25	22–23

== 3rd place play-offs ==
Team 2	Agg.	Team 4	Game 1	Game 2	Game 3
PAOK	2–1	ASE Douka	27–24	22–24	33–20

== Finals ==
In the finals, teams playing against each other have to win three games to win the series. Thus, if one team wins three games before all five games have been played, the remaining games are omitted. The team that finished in the higher championship play-off place, is going to play the first, third and fifth (if necessary) game of the series at home.

Team 1	Agg.	Team 2	Game 1	Game 2	Game 3	Game 4	Game 5
Olympiacos	3–2 (104–105)	AEK	23–25	13–20	22–16	22–21	24–23
