= Alexandros Alvanos =

Greek handball player (born 1980)

Alexis Alvanos
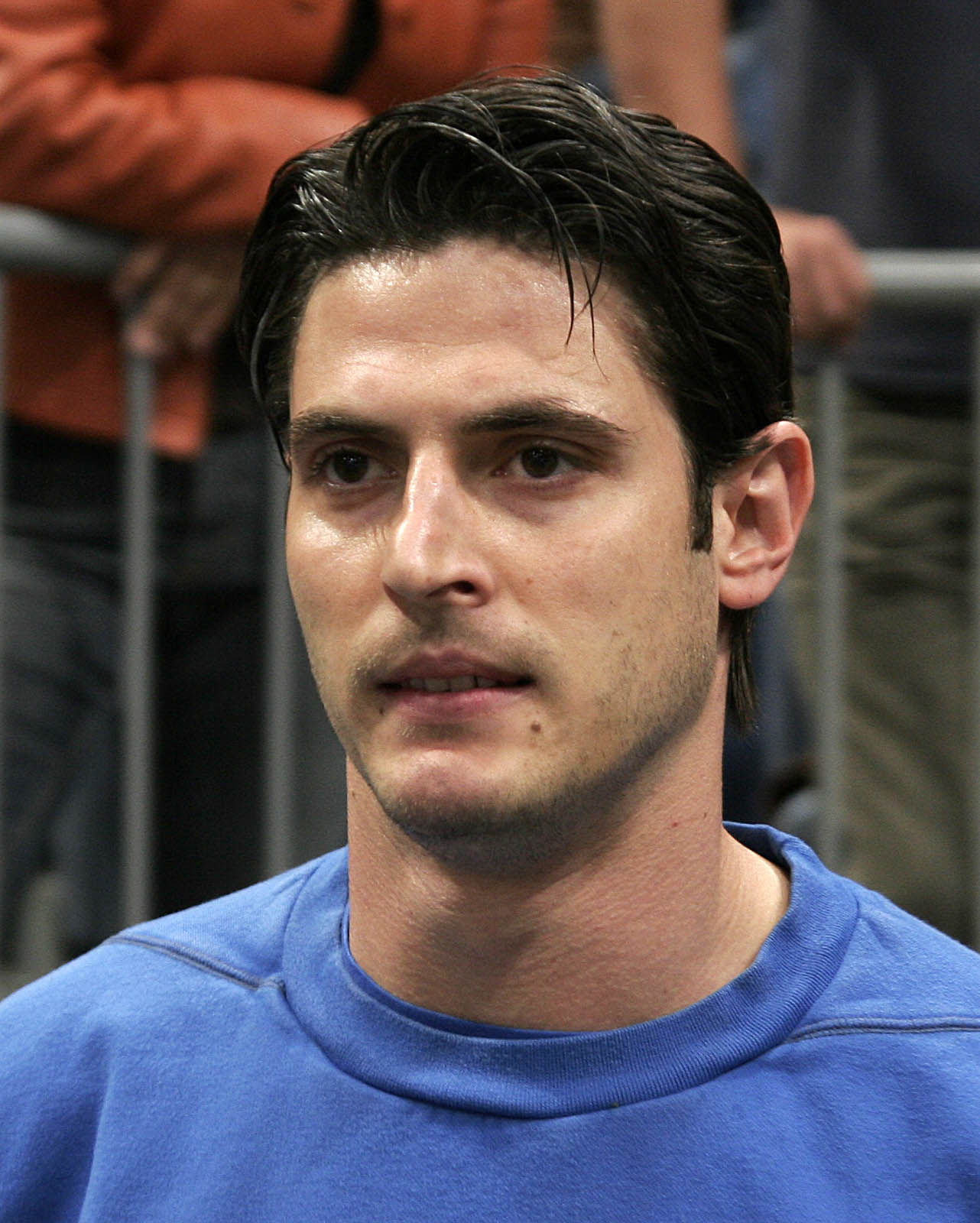

Personal information
- Full name: Alexandros Alvanos
- Nickname: Alexis
- Nationality: Greek
- Born: 9 April 1980 (age 46) Volos, Greece
- Height: 1.87 m (6 ft 2 in)

Sport
- Sport: Handball
- Position: Right Back
- Current club: AEK Athens (head coach)

Youth career
- Years: Team
- 1991–1999: X.A.N. Thessaloniki

Senior clubs
- Years: Team
- 1999–2004: Panellinios
- 2004–2006: HSG Wetzlar
- 2006–2009: VfL Gummersbach
- 2009: Rhein-Neckar Löwen
- 2009–2011: TuS Nettelstedt-Lübbecke
- 2011–2012: HBW Balingen-Weilstetten
- 2012–2014: AEK Athens
- 2014–2016: PAOK
- 2016–2017: IEK Xyni DIKEAS
- 2017–2018: Olympiacos
- 2018–2019: AEK Athens
National team
Years	Team	Apps
1998–2014	Greece	202

Teams managed
- 2022–2023: AEK Athens
- 2026–: AEK Athens

Alexandros Alvanos (Greek: Αλέξανδρος Αλβανός born 9 April 1980) is a Greek retired handball player and current coach. He was included in the Greece national team for the 2004 Summer Olympics and at the 2005 World Championship.
