= Gilberto Duarte =

Portuguese handball player (born 1990)

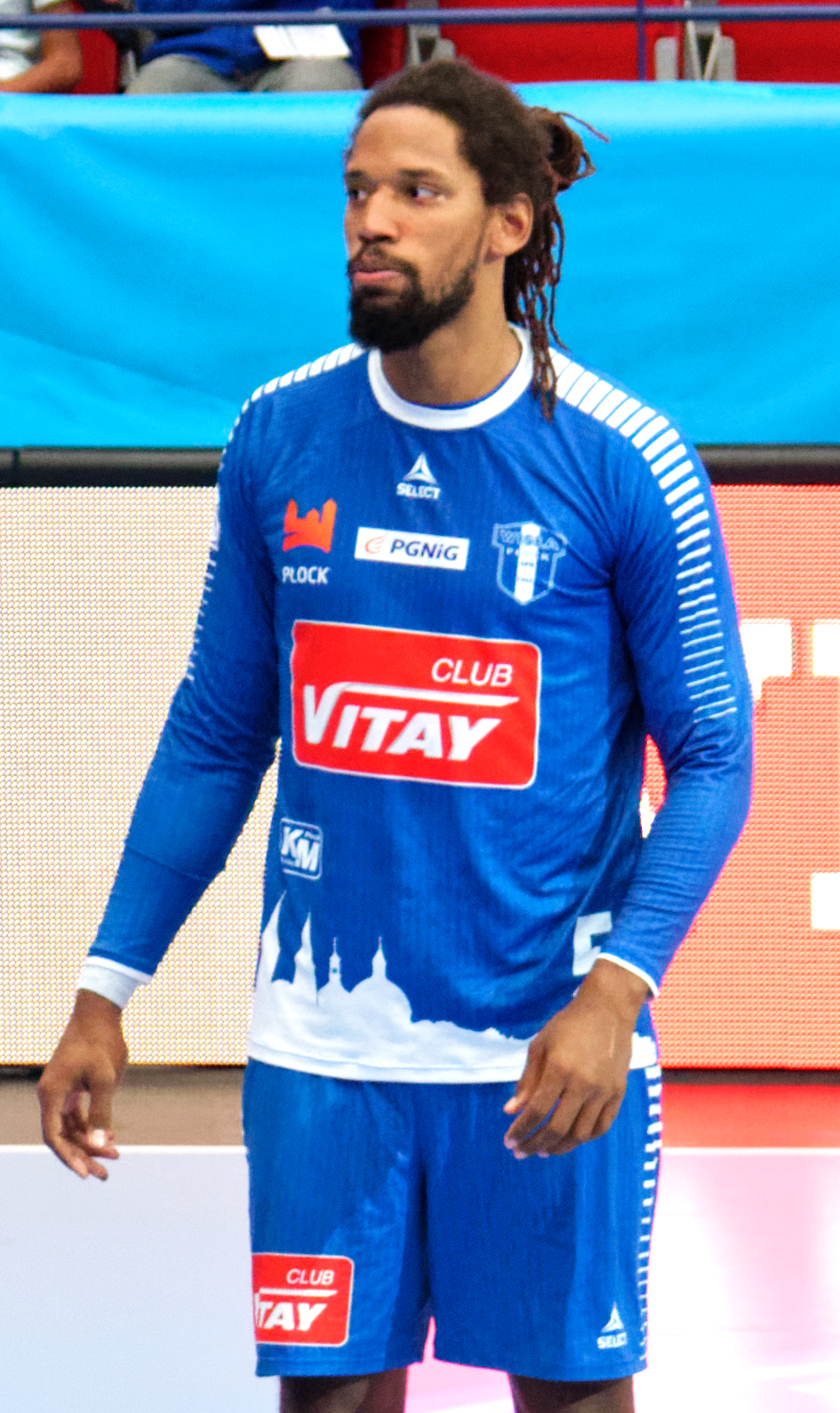
- Duarte in 2016

Personal information
- Full name: Gilberto Brito Duarte
- Born: 6 July 1990 (age 36) Portimão, Portugal
- Height: 1.96 m (6 ft 5 in)

Sport
- Sport: Handball
- Position: Left back
- Current club: AEK Athens
- Number: 5

Youth career
- Years: Team
- 1999–2007: Lagoa AC

Senior clubs
- Years: Team
- 2007–2016: FC Porto
- 2016–2018: Wisła Płock
- 2018–2019: FC Barcelona Lassa
- 2019–2022: Montpellier Handball
- 2022–2023: Frisch Auf Göppingen
- 2023–2024: Pays d'Aix UC
- 2024–: AEK Athens
National team
Years	Team	Apps	(Gls)
2012–	Portugal	126	(314)
- Updated on 20 August 2024

Gilberto Brito Duarte (Note: This name uses Portuguese naming customs: the first or maternal family name is Brito and the second or paternal family name is Duarte.) (born 6 July 1990) is a Portuguese handball player for AEK Athens and the Portuguese national team.

He competed for Portugal at the 2020 Summer Olympics.

== Personal life ==
Born in Portugal, Duarte is of Cape Verdean descent.
