= Dimitrios Kaffatos =

Greek handball player (born 1976)

Personal information
- Nationality: Greece
- Born: 20 March 1976 (age 50) Athens, Greece
- Height: 1.94 m (6 ft 4 in)

Sport
- Sport: Handball
- Position: goalkeeper

Senior clubs
- Years: Team
- –1997: OF Nea Ionia
- 1997–2005: Ionikos Nea Filadelfeia
- 2005–2006: Grasshoppers
- 2006–2007: AEK Athens
- 2007–2008: Teka Cantabria
- 2009–2014: AEK Athens
- 2019–2020: AEK Athens
National team
- Years: Team
- 1997–2013: Greece

Dimitrios Kaffatos (Greek: Δημήτριος Καφφάτος, born 20 March 1976) is a Greek retired handball player. He was a member of the Greece men's national handball team, playing as a goalkeeper. He was a part of the team at the 2004 Summer Olympics. On club level he played for OF Nea Ionia, Ionikos Nea Filadelfeia and AEK Athens in Greece.

== See also ==
- Greece at the 2004 Summer Olympics
