= Mana Horikawa =

Japanese handball player (born 1994)

Personal information
- Nationality: Japanese
- Born: 4 March 1994 (age 32)
- Height: 1.74 m (5 ft 9 in)

Sport
- Sport: Handball
- Position: Pivot
- Current club: lzumi Maple Reds
National team
Years	Team	Apps	(Gls)
–	Japan	13	(2)

Mana Horikawa (Japanese: 堀川真奈. born 4 March 1994) is a Japanese handball player for lzumi Maple Reds and the Japanese national team.

She represented Japan at the 2019 World Women's Handball Championship.
