= Hiroshima Maple Reds =

Japanese handball team

Izumi Maple Reds
- Full name: Izumi Maple Reds
- Short name: Maple Reds
- Founded: 1994
- Arena: Hiroshima Green Arena
- Capacity: 10,000
- League: Japan Handball League
- 2025-26: 6th
Home	Away

Hiroshima Maple Reds is a women's handball team based in Hiroshima, Japan. It plays in the Japan Handball League. The club was founded in 1994 and belonged to IZUMI, a supermarket company in Hiroshima. The club was dissolved in 2001, then reinstated as HIROSHIMA MAPLE REDS by the Hiroshima Women's Sports Club (NPO).

From 1994 to 2006, the club has won the championships of Japan Handball League and others for 24 times in Japan. They won the 1st prize at the Second East Asian Handball Club Championship in 2005 in Suzhou, China. And the 3rd prize at the First in Seongnam, Korea and the 4th prize at the third in Kyoto, Japan. They won the 2nd prize at the 12th Hiroshima International Handball Games in 2007.

In April 2019 they were rebranded as the Izumi Maple Reds and did not play the 2020 season due to coronavirus concerns.

== Team ==
=== Current squad ===
Squad for the 2019-20 season.

Goalkeepers

- 1 (Japan) Taeko Takamori
- 12 (Japan) Minami Itano
- 16 (Japan) Yayoi Kanou
- 22 (Japan) Momoko Nakamura

Wings
RW

- 17 (Japan) Miki Mitsuhashi

LW

- 3 (Japan) Sae Ishikawa
- 9 (Japan) Mai Kadodani
- 26 (Japan) Kaede Yamane

Line players

- 6 (Japan) Mana Horikawa
- 14 (Japan) Rie Inai
- 21 (Japan) Maharu Kondo
- 25 (Japan) Mayuka Nakanishi

Back players
LB

- 7 (Japan) Yuko Kawarabata
- 19 (Japan) Arisa Kimura
- 20 (Japan) Misa Tabuchi
- 27 (Japan) Saya Muramatsu

CB

- 5 (Japan) Maaya Matsugi
- 8 (Japan) Miki Mita
- 28 (Japan) Natsuki Tomai

== Former players ==
- (South Korea) O-Kyung Lim - Head Coach, CP
- (Japan) Akane Aoto - Coach
- (Japan) Aimi Kiyama - CP
- (Japan) Miho Tsuboi -CP
- (Japan) Emi Sakaguchi -CP
- (South Korea) Jin-Soon Kim - CP
- (South Korea) Sung-Ok Oh - CP
- (Japan) Emiko Egashira - GK
- (Japan) Tone Hashizume
- (Japan) Emi Sugimoto
- (Japan) Miho Iwamoto
- (Japan) Yukari Asai
- (South Korea) Lee Min-hee - GK
