= Fanny Helembai =

Hungarian handball player (born 1996)

Fanny Tyiskov-Helembai
Personal information
- Nationality: Hungarian
- Born: 26 December 1996 (age 29) Vác, Hungary
- Height: 1.78 m (5 ft 10 in)

Sport
- Sport: Handball
- Position: Pivot
- Current club: Váci NKSE
- Number: 96

Senior clubs
- Years: Team
- 2017–: Váci NKSE
National team
Years	Team	Apps	(Gls)
2020–	Hungary	20	(18)

Fanny Tyiskov-Helembai (born 26 December 1996) is a Hungarian female handball player for Váci NKSE and the Hungarian national team.

She represented Hungary at the 2020 European Women's Handball Championship.
