= Julius Kühn (handballer) =

German handball player (born 1993)

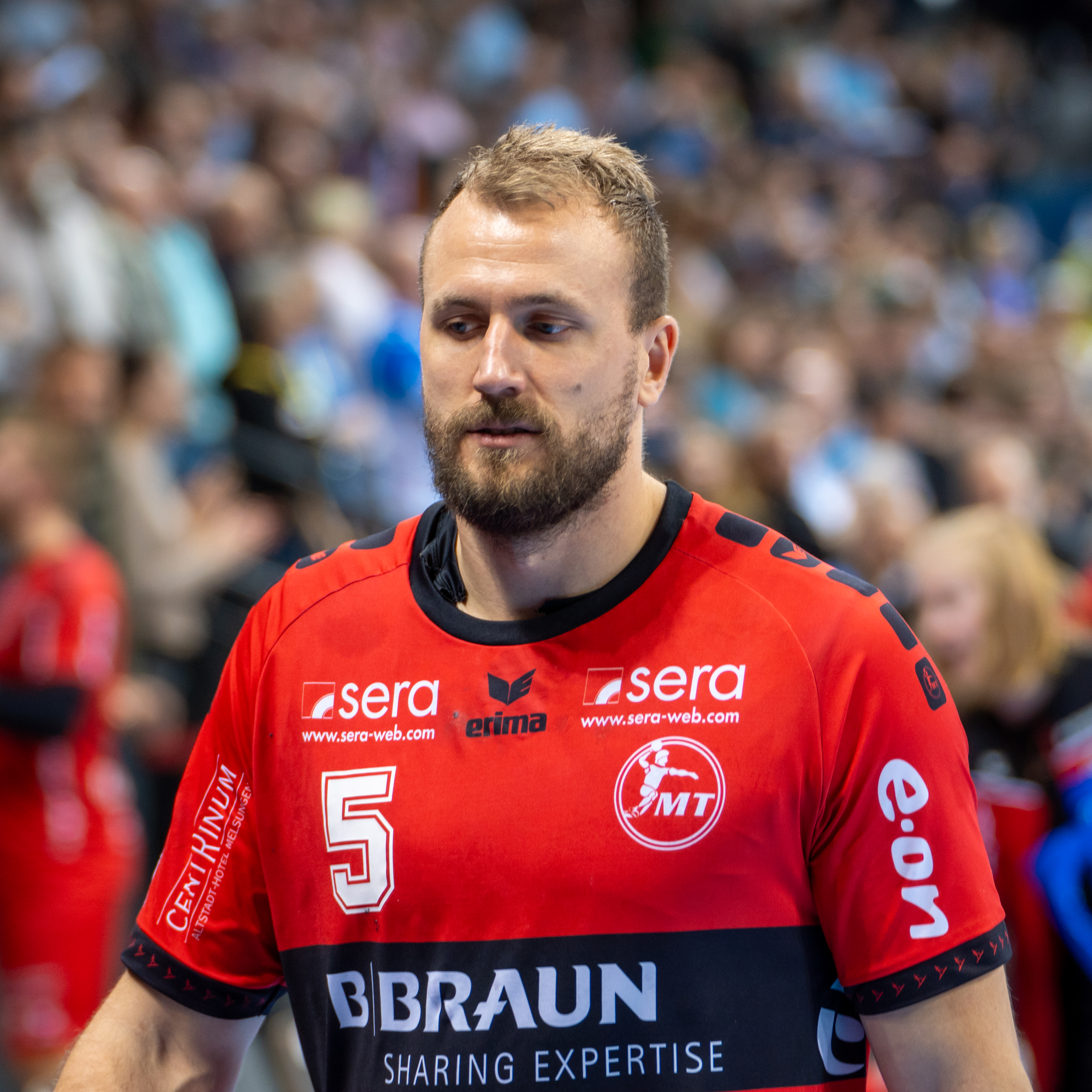
- Kühn in 2024

Personal information
- Nationality: German
- Born: 1 April 1993 (age 33) Duisburg, Germany
- Height: 1.98 m (6 ft 6 in)

Sport
- Sport: Handball
- Position: Left back
- Current club: AEK Athens
- Number: 5

Youth career
- Years: Team
- 1999–2008: TV Aldekerk
- 2008–2011: HSG Düsseldorf

Senior clubs
- Years: Team
- 2011–2012: HSG Düsseldorf
- 2012–2014: TUSEM Essen
- 2014–2017: VfL Gummersbach
- 2017–2024: MT Melsungen
- 2024–2025: SG BBM Bietigheim
- 2025–: AEK Athens
National team
Years	Team	Apps	(Gls)
2014–	Germany	92	(294)
Medal record
Olympic Games
Bronze medal – third place	2016 Rio de Janeiro	Team
European Championship
Gold medal – first place	2016 Poland
- Updated on 12 July 2024

Julius Kühn (born 1 April 1993) is a German handball player for AEK Athens.

== Career ==
Kühn started at TV Aldekerk in 1999, before joining HSG Düsseldorf in 2008. In 2010, he won the German youth championship. In the 2010-2011 season he became a part of the first team.

In January 2012, he joined TUSEM Essen In 2014 he joined VfL Gummersbach on a two-year deal. When that expired he signed a two-year extension. In 2017 he joined MT Melsungen. On March 4, 2021, he scored his Bundesliga goal no. 1000 in a match against HC Erlangen. He finished the season as the second best outfield goalscorer in the Bundesliga with 211 goals. In 2023 he joined SG BBM Bietigheim.

=== Season statistics ===
Season	Team	League	Games	Goals	Penalty goals	Outfield Goals
2011/12	HSG Düsseldorf/TUSEM Essen	2. Bundesliga	38	105	1	104
2012/13	TUSEM Essen	Bundesliga	34	73	0	73
2013/14	TUSEM Essen	2. Bundesliga	27	133	0	133
2014/15	VfL Gummersbach	Bundesliga	36	113	0	113
2015/16	VfL Gummersbach	Bundesliga	32	161	5	156
2016/17	VfL Gummersbach	Bundesliga	26	166	39	127
2017/18	MT Melsungen	Bundesliga	33	224	9	215
2018/19	MT Melsungen	Bundesliga	10	62	0	62
2019/20	MT Melsungen	Bundesliga	26	107	0	107
2020/21	MT Melsungen	Bundesliga	38	211	0	211
2021/22	MT Melsungen	Bundesliga	34	157	1	156
2022/23	MT Melsungen	Bundesliga	21	40	0	40
2023/24	MT Melsungen	Bundesliga	34	60	0	60
2011–2014	2. Handball-Bundesliga	Total	65	238	1	237
2012–2024	Handball-Bundesliga	Total	324	1374	54	1320
2011–2024	Total	Karriere	389	1612	55	1557

Source: Player profile at Handball-Bundesliga

=== National team ===
Kühn was called up to the German national team for the first time on 9 September 2014 by Dagur Sigurðsson. He debuted on 20 September 2014 in a home match against Switzerland.

At the 2016 European Championship, he was not initially part of the team but was included for the last match of the main round to replace Christian Dissinger. Germany won the tournament, beating Spain in the final 24–17. Later the same year he was part of the German team that won bronze medals at the 2016 Olympics. For this he was awarded the Silbernes Lorbeerblatt.

He also represented Germany at the 2018 European Championship.

At the 2020 European Championship, he had become a key part of the team. At the 2020 Olympics, he also represented Germany.

He played a single game at the 2022 European Championship against Belarus, before he had to leave with a positive COVID-19 test.

== Achievements ==
- Summer Olympics:
  - Bronze: 2016
- European Championship:
  - Gold: 2016

== Private life ==
Kühn is related to the German handball player Dana Bleckmann.
