= Handball at the 2024 Summer Olympics =

Handball at the Games of the XXXIII Olympiad

Tournament details
- Host country: France
- Venue(s): South Paris Arena 6 Pierre Mauroy Stadium
- Dates: 25 July – 11 August 2024
- Teams: 24 (from 4 confederations)

Final positions
- Champions: Denmark (men); Norway (women)
- Runners-up: Germany (men); France (women)
- Third place: Spain (men); Denmark (women)
- Fourth place: Slovenia (men); Sweden (women)

The handball tournaments at the 2024 Summer Olympics in Paris, France were held from 25 July to 11 August 2024. Preliminary pool matches occurred at South Paris Arena 6, with the final phase staged at Pierre Mauroy Stadium in Lille. The format remained the same since 2000 for the men and 2008 for the women, as twelve teams in two groups battle each other in the round robin, followed by the knockout matches for the top eight starting with the quarterfinals and ending with the final and bronze match.

Denmark won the men's tournament in a clean sweep with Germany on second place. Host France became 8th. Norway won by the women defeating France in the final. The final set a spectators record for a women's handball match with 26,664 spectators.

Most valuable players were Katrine Lunde (NOR) for the women and Mathias Gidsel (DEN) for the men. The latter broke countryman Mikkel Hansen's record for most goals in a tournament with 62. Hansen on the other hand improved his own record for most goals in olympic handball to 183. He, Danish goalkeeper Niklas Landin Jacobsen and French Nikola Karabatić all played their last tournament. Put together they have won IHF World Player of the Year 8 times.

== Schedule ==
GS	Group stage	QF	Quarter-finals	SF	Semi-finals	B	Bronze medal match	F	Gold medal match

Date Event	Thu 25	Fri 26	Sat 27	Sun 28	Mon 29	Tue 30	Wed 31	Thr 1	Fri 2	Sat 3	Sun 4	Mon 5	Tue 6	Wed 7	Thu 8	Fri 9	Sat 10		Sun 11	
Men			GS		GS		GS		GS		GS			1/4		1/2			B	F
Women	GS			GS		GS		GS		GS			1/4		1/2		B	F		

== Events ==
Two sets of medals will be awarded in the following events:

- Men's handball (12 teams)
- Women's handball (12 teams)

== Venues ==
Paris	Handball at the 2024 Summer Olympics is located in France
Paris Expo Porte de Versailles	Handball at the 2024 Summer Olympics is located in France
Capacity: 5,200	Handball at the 2024 Summer Olympics is located in France
Lille	Handball at the 2024 Summer Olympics is located in France
Stade Pierre-Mauroy	Handball at the 2024 Summer Olympics is located in France
Capacity: 27,500	Handball at the 2024 Summer Olympics is located in France

The Stade Pierre-Mauroy stadium in Lille can be changed from a football stadium to a handball stadium in three hours by moving the center part with hydraulics lifts and slide them above the other part of the field. This creates a lower-level center floor around which up to 30,000 seats can be set up. The handball court is turned 90° compared to the football pitch.

== Qualification ==
The National Olympic Committees might enter only one 14-player men's team and only one 14-player women's team.

=== Qualification summary ===
Nation	Men's	Women's	Athletes
Angola	—N/a	Yes	14
Argentina	Yes	—N/a	14
Brazil	—N/a	Yes	14
Croatia	Yes	—N/a	14
Denmark	Yes	Yes	28
Egypt	Yes	—N/a	14
France	Yes	Yes	28
Germany	Yes	Yes	28
Hungary	Yes	Yes	28
Japan	Yes	—N/a	14
Netherlands	—N/a	Yes	14
Norway	Yes	Yes	28
Slovenia	Yes	Yes	28
South Korea	—N/a	Yes	14
Spain	Yes	Yes	28
Sweden	Yes	Yes	28
Total: 16 NOCs	168	168	336

=== Men's qualification ===
Qualification	Date	Host	Berths	Qualified team
Host nation	—N/a	—N/a	1	France
2023 World Championship	11–29 January 2023	Poland; Sweden	1	Denmark
2023 Asian Qualification Tournament	18–28 October 2023	(Qatar) Doha	1	Japan
2023 Pan American Games	30 October – 4 November 2023	(Chile) Viña del Mar	1	Argentina
2024 European Championship	10–28 January 2024	Germany	1	Sweden
2024 African Championship	17–27 January 2024	(Egypt) Cairo	1	Egypt
2024 IHF Men's Olympic Qualification Tournaments	14–17 March 2024	(Spain) Granollers	2	Spain; Slovenia
2024 IHF Men's Olympic Qualification Tournaments	14–17 March 2024	(Germany) Hanover	2	Croatia; Germany
2024 IHF Men's Olympic Qualification Tournaments	14–17 March 2024	(Hungary) Tatabánya	2	Norway; Hungary
Total			12	

=== Women's qualification ===
Qualification	Date	Host	Berths	Qualified team
Host nation	—N/a	—N/a	1	France
2022 European Championship	4–20 November 2022	Slovenia; North Macedonia; Montenegro	1	Denmark
2023 Asian Qualification Tournament	17–23 August 2023	(Japan) Hiroshima	1	South Korea
2023 African Qualification Tournament	11–14 October 2023	(Angola) Luanda	1	Angola
2023 Pan American Games	24–29 October 2023	(Chile) Viña del Mar	1	Brazil
2023 World Championship	29 November – 17 December 2023	Denmark; Norway; Sweden	1	Norway
2024 IHF Women's Olympic Qualification Tournaments	11–14 April 2024	(Hungary) Debrecen	2	Hungary; Sweden
2024 IHF Women's Olympic Qualification Tournaments	11–14 April 2024	(Spain) Torrevieja	2	Netherlands; Spain
2024 IHF Women's Olympic Qualification Tournaments	11–14 April 2024	(Germany) Neu-Ulm	2	Germany; Slovenia
Total			12	

== Medal summary ==
=== Medal table ===
* Host nation (France)

Rank	NOC	Gold	Silver	Bronze	Total
1	Denmark	1	0	1	2
2	Norway	1	0	0	1
3	France*	0	1	0	1
3	Germany	0	1	0	1
5	Spain	0	0	1	1
Totals (5 entries)		2	2	2	6

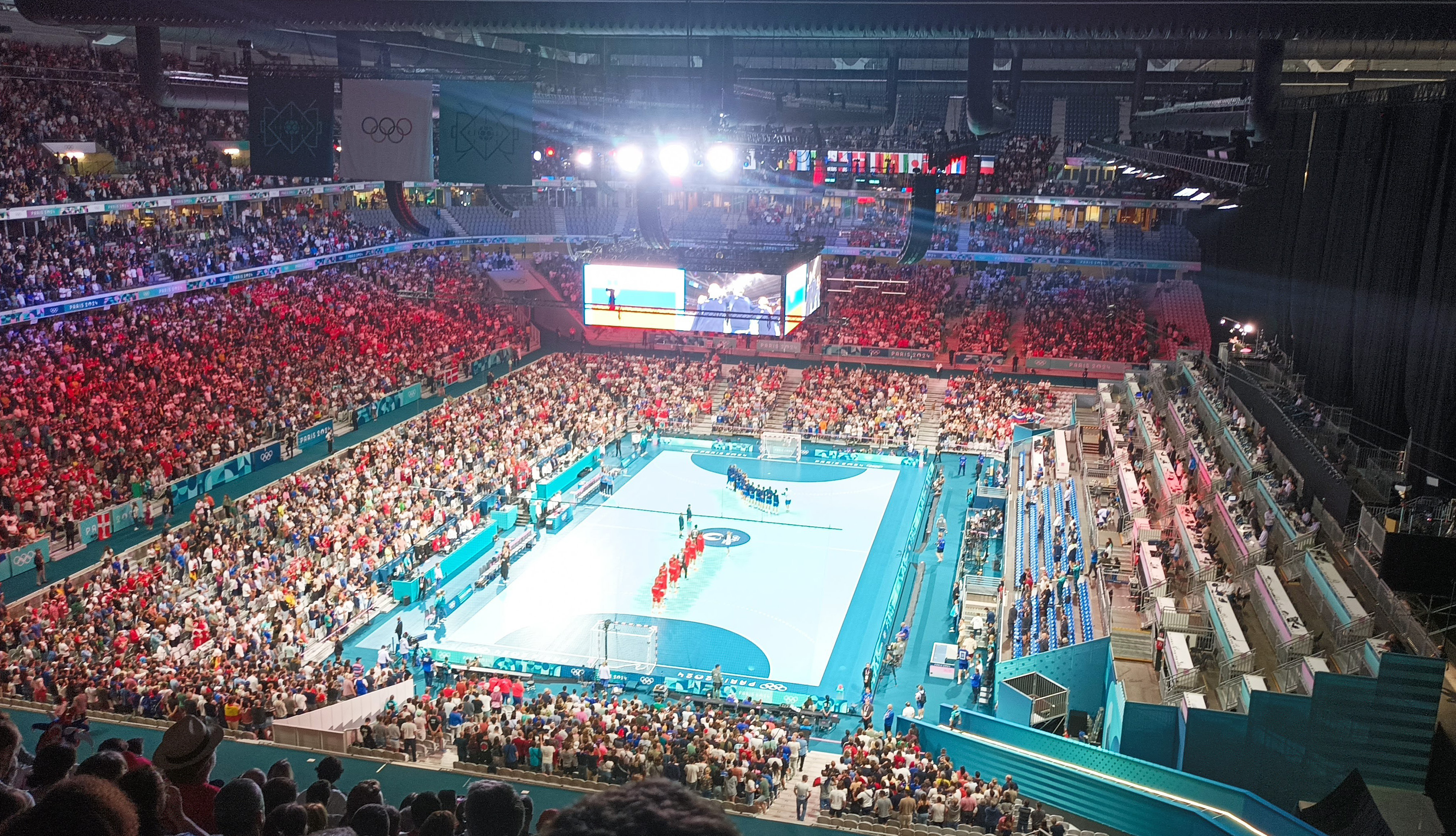
Men's tournament Denmark v. Slovenia, semifinals

=== Medalists ===
Event	Gold	Silver	Bronze
Men	Denmark; Niklas Landin Jacobsen; Niclas Kirkeløkke; Magnus Landin Jacobsen; Emil Jakobsen; Rasmus Lauge; Emil Nielsen; Magnus Saugstrup; Hans Lindberg; Mathias Gidsel; Henrik Møllgaard; Mikkel Hansen; Lukas Jørgensen; Lasse Andersson; Simon Hald; Thomas Sommer Arnoldsen; Simon Pytlick	Germany; David Späth; Johannes Golla; Luca Witzke; Sebastian Heymann; Justus Fischer; Juri Knorr; Julian Köster; Renārs Uščins; Kai Häfner; Tim Hornke; Andreas Wolff; Rune Dahmke; Lukas Mertens; Christoph Steinert; Marko Grgić; Jannik Kohlbacher	Spain; Gonzalo Pérez de Vargas; Jorge Maqueda; Alex Dujshebaev; Rodrigo Corrales; Adrià Figueras; Imanol Garciandia; Abel Serdio; Agustín Casado; Aleix Gómez; Ian Tarrafeta; Miguel Sánchez-Migallón; Daniel Dujshebaev; Kauldi Odriozola; Daniel Fernández; Javier Rodríguez Moreno
Women	Norway; Veronica Kristiansen; Maren Nyland Aardahl; Stine Skogrand; Nora Mørk; Stine Bredal Oftedal; Silje Solberg-Østhassel; Kari Brattset Dale; Kristine Breistøl; Vilde Ingstad; Katrine Lunde; Marit Røsberg Jacobsen; Camilla Herrem; Sanna Solberg-Isaksen; Henny Reistad; Thale Rushfeldt Deila	France; Laura Glauser; Méline Nocandy; Alicia Toublanc; Chloé Valentini; Coralie Lassource; Grâce Zaadi; Cléopatre Darleux; Laura Flippes; Orlane Kanor; Tamara Horacek; Pauletta Foppa; Estelle Nze Minko; Oriane Ondono; Lucie Granier; Sarah Bouktit; Léna Grandveau; Hatadou Sako	Denmark; Sandra Toft; Sarah Iversen; Helena Elver; Anne Mette Hansen; Kathrine Heindahl; Line Haugsted; Althea Reinhardt; Mette Tranborg; Kristina Jørgensen; Trine Østergaard; Louise Burgaard; Mie Højlund; Emma Friis; Rikke Iversen; Michala Møller

== Men's tournament ==
=== Preliminary round ===
==== Group A ====
Pos	Team	Pld	W	D	L	GF	GA	GD	Pts	Qualification
1	Germany	5	4	0	1	162	144	+18	8	Quarterfinals
2	Slovenia	5	3	0	2	140	142	−2	6 (Note: Slovenia 2 Pts, +2 GD; Spain 2 Pts, 0 GD; Sweden 2 Pts, −2 GD.)	Quarterfinals
3	Spain	5	3	0	2	151	148	+3	6	Quarterfinals
4	Sweden	5	3	0	2	158	139	+19	6	Quarterfinals
5	Croatia	5	2	0	3	148	156	−8	4	
6	Japan	5	0	0	5	143	173	−30	0	

Source: Olympics Paris 2024 rankings
Rules for classification: 1) Points; 2) Head-to-head points; 3) Head-to-head goal difference; 4) Head-to-head goals scored; 5) Goal difference; 6) Goals scored; 7) Draw.

==== Group B ====
Pos	Team	Pld	W	D	L	GF	GA	GD	Pts	Qualification
1	Denmark	5	5	0	0	165	133	+32	10	Quarterfinals
2	Egypt	5	3	1	1	148	140	+8	7	Quarterfinals
3	Norway	5	3	0	2	139	136	+3	6	Quarterfinals
4	France (H)	5	2	1	2	129	131	−2	5	Quarterfinals
5	Hungary	5	1	0	4	137	138	−1	2	
6	Argentina	5	0	0	5	131	171	−40	0	

Source: Olympics Paris 2024 rankings
Rules for classification: 1) Points; 2) Head-to-head points; 3) Head-to-head goal difference; 4) Head-to-head goals scored; 5) Goal difference; 6) Goals scored; 7) Draw.
(H) Hosts

=== Knockout stage ===
Quarterfinals
7 August
Germany (ET)	35
France	34
7 August
Spain (ET)	29
Egypt	28
7 August
Norway	28
Slovenia	33
7 August
Denmark	32
Sweden	31

Semifinals
9 August
Germany	25
Spain	24
9 August
Slovenia	30
Denmark	31

Gold medal
11 August
Germany	26
Denmark	39
Bronze medal
11 August
Spain	23
Slovenia	22

=== Final standings ===
Rank	Team
1st place, gold medalist(s)	Denmark
2nd place, silver medalist(s)	Germany
3rd place, bronze medalist(s)	Spain
4	Slovenia
5	Egypt
6	Norway
7	Sweden
8	France
9	Croatia
10	Hungary
11	Japan
12	Argentina

== Women's tournament ==
=== Preliminary round ===
==== Group A ====
Pos	Team	Pld	W	D	L	GF	GA	GD	Pts	Qualification
1	Norway	5	4	0	1	140	110	+30	8 (Note: Norway 2 Pts, +5 GD; Sweden 2 Pts, +2 GD; Denmark 2 Pts, −7 GD.)	Quarterfinals
2	Sweden	5	4	0	1	140	125	+15	8	Quarterfinals
3	Denmark	5	4	0	1	126	116	+10	8	Quarterfinals
4	Germany	5	1	0	4	136	134	+2	2 (Note: Germany 2 Pts, +18 GD; South Korea 2 Pts, −6 GD; Slovenia 2 Pts, −12 GD.)	Quarterfinals
5	South Korea	5	1	0	4	107	133	−26	2	
6	Slovenia	5	1	0	4	116	147	−31	2	

Source: Olympics Paris 2024 rankings
Rules for classification: 1) Points; 2) Head-to-head points; 3) Head-to-head goal difference; 4) Head-to-head goals scored; 5) Goal difference; 6) Goals scored; 7) Draw.

==== Group B ====
Pos	Team	Pld	W	D	L	GF	GA	GD	Pts	Qualification
1	France (H)	5	5	0	0	159	124	+35	10	Quarterfinals
2	Netherlands	5	4	0	1	152	137	+15	8	Quarterfinals
3	Hungary	5	2	1	2	137	140	−3	5	Quarterfinals
4	Brazil	5	2	0	3	127	119	+8	4	Quarterfinals
5	Angola	5	1	1	3	131	154	−23	3	
6	Spain	5	0	0	5	111	143	−32	0	

Source: Olympics Paris 2024 rankings
Rules for classification: 1) Points; 2) Head-to-head points; 3) Head-to-head goal difference; 4) Head-to-head goals scored; 5) Goal difference; 6) Goals scored; 7) Draw.
(H) Hosts

=== Knockout stage ===
Quarterfinals
6 August
Norway	32
Brazil	15
6 August
Denmark	29
Netherlands	25
6 August
Hungary	32
Sweden (ET)	36
6 August
France	26
Germany	23

Semifinals
8 August
Norway	25
Denmark	21
8 August
Sweden	28
France (ET)	31

Gold medal
10 August
Norway	29
France	21
Bronze medal
10 August
Denmark	30
Sweden	25

=== Final standings ===
Rank	Team
1st place, gold medalist(s)	Norway
2nd place, silver medalist(s)	France
3rd place, bronze medalist(s)	Denmark
4	Sweden
5	Netherlands
6	Hungary
7	Brazil
8	Germany
9	Angola
10	South Korea
11	Slovenia
12	Spain

== See also ==
- Handball at the 2023 Pan American Games
- Handball at the 2022 Asian Games
