= EHF Excellence Awards =

Annual handball awards ceremony

- Sport: Handball
- Competition: European Handball
- Awarded for: Best Performances of the season

History
- First award: 2023

The EHF Excellence Awards is an annual handball awards ceremony held by the European Handball Federation. It was first held in 2023 in Vienna, Austria. The best players of the season on each position both on the men's and women's side are awarded, as well as Rookie of the season, Defender of the season, and MVP of the season. The ceremony also includes Beach Handball MVP's.

Players can be shortlisted by their performance in the EHF Champions League, EHF European League, EHF Euro, and the IHF World Championship. The winners are decided by voting from players, coaches, media representatives and fans, each group representing 25% of the votes.

== Men's handball ==
Position	Season 2022/2023	Season 2023/2024	Season 2024/2025	Season 2025/2026
Left wing	(Russia) Timur Dibirov	(Denmark) Emil Jakobsen	(Denmark) Emil Jakobsen (2)	(Germany) Tim Freihöfer
Left back	(Denmark) Simon Pytlick	(France) Elohim Prandi	(Sweden) Felix Claar (2)	(Denmark) Lasse Andersson
Centre back	(Netherlands) Luc Steins	(Sweden) Felix Claar	(Iceland) Gísli Þorgeir Kristjánsson	(Slovenia) Domen Makuc
Right back	(Denmark) Mathias Gidsel	(France) Dika Mem	(Denmark) Mathias Gidsel (2)	(Denmark) Mathias Gidsel (3)
Right wing	(Denmark) Hans Lindberg	(Denmark) Hans Lindberg (2)	(Croatia) Mario Šoštarić	(Spain) Aleix Gómez
Line player	(France) Ludovic Fabregas	(France) Ludovic Fabregas (2)	(France) Ludovic Fabregas (3)	(Denmark) Magnus Saugstrup
Goalkeeper	(Denmark) Niklas Landin	(Denmark) Emil Nielsen	(Denmark) Emil Nielsen (2)	(Denmark) Emil Nielsen (3)
Defender	(Brazil) Thiagus Petrus	(Denmark) Magnus Saugstrup	(Denmark) Magnus Saugstrup (2)	(France) Ludovic Fabregas
Young player of the season	(Slovenia) Domen Makuc	(Portugal) Martim Costa	(Spain) Ian Barrufet	(Portugal) Francisco Costa
MVP	(Denmark) Simon Pytlick	(Denmark) Emil Nielsen	(Denmark) Mathias Gidsel (3)	(Denmark) Emil Nielsen (2)

=== Awards by country ===
Nation	Awards
Denmark	20
France	6
Portugal	2
Slovenia	2
Spain	2
Sweden	2
Brazil	1
Croatia	1
Germany	1
Iceland	1
Netherlands	1
Russia	1

=== Most awarded players ===
Player	Awards
(Denmark) Emil Nielsen	5
(Denmark) Mathias Gidsel	4
(France) Ludovic Fabregas	4
(Denmark) Magnus Saugstrup	3

== Women's handball ==
Position	Season 2022/2023	Season 2023/2024	Season 2024/2025	Season 2025/2026
Left wing	(Denmark) Emma Friis	(France) Chloé Valentini	(France) Chloé Valentini (2)	(France) Chloé Valentini (3)
Left back	(Romania) Cristina Neagu	(Norway) Henny Reistad (2)	(France) Estelle Nze Minko	(Brazil) Bruna de Paula
Centre back	(Norway) Henny Reistad	(Norway) Stine Bredal Oftedal	(Norway) Henny Reistad (3)	(Norway) Henny Reistad (4)
Right back	(Norway) Nora Mørk (Slovenia) Ana Gros^{[a]}	(Russia) Anna Vyakhireva	(Netherlands) Dione Housheer	(Netherlands) Dione Housheer (2)
Right wing	(Netherlands) Angela Malestein	(Hungary) Viktória Győri-Lukács	(Hungary) Viktória Győri-Lukács (2)	(France) Lucie Granier
Line player	(Norway) Vilde Ingstad	(France) Sarah Bouktit	(Norway) Kari Brattset Dale	(France) Sarah Bouktit (2)
Goalkeeper	(Norway) Katrine Lunde	(Denmark) Sandra Toft	(Norway) Katrine Lunde (2)	(Sweden) Johanna Bundsen
Defender	(Denmark) Kathrine Heindahl	(Denmark) Line Haugsted	(Norway) Kari Brattset Dale (2)	(Netherlands) Kelly Dulfer
Rookie	(France) Pauletta Foppa	(Hungary) Petra Simon	(Switzerland) Mia Emmenegger	(France) Lylou Borg
MVP	(Norway) Katrine Lunde	(Norway) Stine Bredal Oftedal	(Norway) Henny Reistad (4)	(France) Sarah Bouktit (3)

^{a} There was a complete tie in the voting results between the two players, and they both received the award.

=== Awards by country ===
Nation	Awards
Norway	14
France	10
Denmark	4
Netherlands	4
Hungary	3
Brazil	1
Romania	1
Russia	1
Slovenia	1
Sweden	1
Switzerland	1

=== Most awarded players ===
Player	Awards
(Norway) Henny Reistad	5
(Norway) Katrine Lunde	3
(France) Chloé Valentini	3
(France) Sarah Bouktit	3

== Beach handball ==
Season	Men's MVP	Women's MVP
2022/23	(Portugal) Gabriel Conceição	(Spain) Asun Batista
