= Emmanuel Mayonnade =

French handball coach

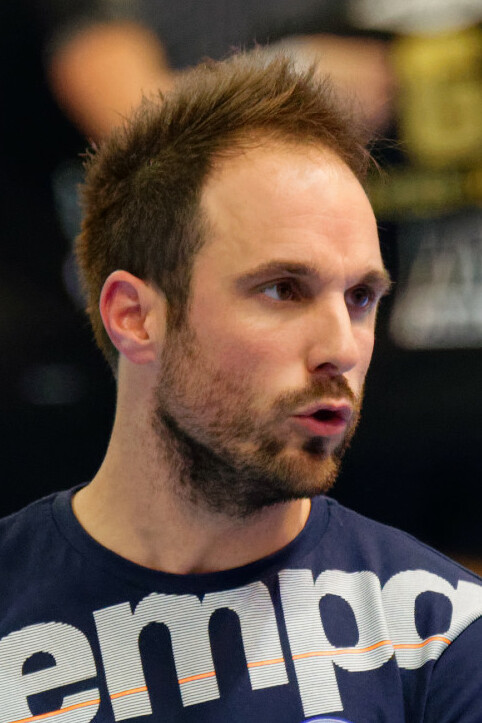

Personal information
- Nationality: French
- Born: 12 June 1983 (age 43) Bordeaux, France

Sport
- Sport: Handball
- Current club: Metz Handball

Teams managed
- Years: Team
- 2006–2015: Mios-Biganos
- 2015–: Metz Handball
- 2019–2021: Netherlands

Emmanuel Mayonnade (born 12 June 1983) is a French handball coach who currently serves as head coach of Metz Handball and previously the Dutch women's national team.

He coached the Netherlands at the 2019 World Women's Handball Championship, where the Netherlands won their first ever title.

== Honours ==
=== Manager ===
Clubs

- Championnat de France:
  - Winner: 2016, 2017, 2018, 2019, 2022, 2023, 2024, 2025
- Coupe de France:
  - Winner: 2009, 2017, 2019, 2022, 2023, 2024, 2025, 2026
- EHF Challenge Cup:
  - Winner: 2011

Netherlands

- World Women's Handball Championship:
  - Winner: 2019

=== Individual ===
- IHF World Coach of the Year: 2019
- Championnat de France Best coach: 2010, 2016, 2017, 2018
- EHF Champions League Best coach: 2019, 2020
