= Handball at the 2024 Summer Olympics – Women's tournament =

Women's handball at the XXXIII Olympiad

Tournament details
- Host country: France
- Venue(s): South Paris Arena 6 Pierre Mauroy Stadium (in 2 host cities)
- Dates: 25 July – 10 August
- Teams: 12 (from 5 confederations)

Final positions
- Champions: Norway (3rd title)
- Runners-up: France
- Third place: Denmark
- Fourth place: Sweden

Tournament statistics
- Matches played: 38
- Goals scored: 2,010 (52.89 per match)
- Attendance: 344,552 (9,067 per match)
- Top scorer(s): (Sweden) Nathalie Hagman (41 goals)

Awards
- Best player: (Norway) Katrine Lunde

The women's handball tournament at the 2024 Summer Olympics was the 13th edition of the handball event for women at the Summer Olympic Games. It was held from 25 July to 10 August 2024. The preliminary round games were played at the South Paris Arena 6 in Paris and the final games at the Pierre Mauroy Stadium in Lille, France.

Norway won their third title after a win over France. Denmark captured the bronze medal with a victory over Sweden.

== Schedule ==
The schedule of the tournament was as follows.

Legend
G	Group stage	¼	Quarter-finals	½	Semi-finals	B	Bronze medal match	F	Gold medal match

Thu 25	Fri 26	Sat 27	Sun 28	Mon 29	Tue 30	Wed 31	Thu 1	Fri 2	Sat 3	Sun 4	Mon 5	Tue 6	Wed 7	Thu 8	Fri 9	Sat 10	
G			G		G		G		G			¼		½		B	F

== Qualification ==
Qualification	Date	Host	Berths	Qualified team
Host nation	—	—	1	France
2022 European Championship	4–20 November 2022	Slovenia; North Macedonia; Montenegro	1	Denmark
2023 Asian Qualification Tournament	17–23 August 2023	(Japan) Hiroshima	1	South Korea
2023 African Qualification Tournament	11–14 October 2023	(Angola) Luanda	1	Angola
2023 Pan American Games	24–29 October 2023	(Chile) Viña del Mar	1	Brazil
2023 World Championship	29 November – 17 December 2023	Denmark; Norway; Sweden	1	Norway
2024 IHF Women's Olympic Qualification Tournaments	11–14 April 2024	(Hungary) Debrecen	2	Hungary; Sweden
2024 IHF Women's Olympic Qualification Tournaments	11–14 April 2024	(Spain) Torrevieja	2	Netherlands; Spain
2024 IHF Women's Olympic Qualification Tournaments	11–14 April 2024	(Germany) Neu-Ulm	2	Germany; Slovenia
Total			12	

== Draw ==
The draw was held on 16 April 2024.

=== Seeding ===
The seeding was revealed on 14 April 2024.

Pot 1	Pot 2	Pot 3	Pot 4	Pot 5	Pot 6
Norway; Hungary	Netherlands; Germany	Slovenia; Spain	Sweden; France	Denmark; Brazil	Angola; South Korea

== Referees ==
The referee pairs were announced on 26 April 2024.

Referees
Algeria	Youcef Belkhiri; Sid Ali Hamidi
Argentina	Mariana García; María Paolantoni
Bosnia and Herzegovina	Amar Konjičanin; Dino Konjičanin
Czech Republic	Václav Horáček; Jiří Novotný
Denmark	Mads Hansen; Jesper Madsen
France	Charlotte Bonaventura; Julie Bonaventura
Germany	Robert Schulze; Tobias Tönnies
Germany	Tanja Kuttler; Maike Merz

Referees
Hungary	Ádám Bíró; Olivér Kiss
North Macedonia	Gjorgji Nachevski; Slave Nikolov
Montenegro	Ivan Pavićević; Miloš Ražnatović
Norway	Lars Jørum; Håvard Kleven
Slovenia	Bojan Lah; David Sok
Spain	Ignacio García; Andreu Marín
Sweden	Mirza Kurtagic; Mattias Wetterwik
Switzerland	Arthur Brunner; Morad Salah

== Preliminary round ==
All times are local (UTC+2).

=== Group A ===
Pos	Team	Pld	W	D	L	GF	GA	GD	Pts	Qualification
1	Norway	5	4	0	1	140	110	+30	8 (Note: Norway 2 Pts, +5 GD; Sweden 2 Pts, +2 GD; Denmark 2 Pts, −7 GD.)	Quarterfinals
2	Sweden	5	4	0	1	140	125	+15	8	Quarterfinals
3	Denmark	5	4	0	1	126	116	+10	8	Quarterfinals
4	Germany	5	1	0	4	136	134	+2	2 (Note: Germany 2 Pts, +18 GD; South Korea 2 Pts, −6 GD; Slovenia 2 Pts, −12 GD.)	Quarterfinals
5	South Korea	5	1	0	4	107	133	−26	2	
6	Slovenia	5	1	0	4	116	147	−31	2	

Source: Olympics Paris 2024 rankings
Rules for classification: 1) Points; 2) Head-to-head points; 3) Head-to-head goal difference; 4) Head-to-head goals scored; 5) Goal difference; 6) Goals scored; 7) Draw.
Notes:

25 July 2024; 09:00	Slovenia	19–27	Denmark	Paris Expo Porte de Versailles, Paris; Attendance: 5,686; Referees: Brunner, Salah (SUI)
25 July 2024; 09:00	Gros, Stanko 5	(11–14)	Friis, Østergaard 5	Paris Expo Porte de Versailles, Paris; Attendance: 5,686; Referees: Brunner, Salah (SUI)
25 July 2024; 09:00	1× (yellow card) 6× (suspension)	Report	1× (yellow card) 5× (suspension)	Paris Expo Porte de Versailles, Paris; Attendance: 5,686; Referees: Brunner, Salah (SUI)

25 July 2024; 16:00	Germany	22–23	South Korea	Paris Expo Porte de Versailles, Paris; Attendance: 5,765; Referees: Belkhiri, Hamidi (ALG)
25 July 2024; 16:00	Döll 6	(10–11)	Kang K., Ryu 6	Paris Expo Porte de Versailles, Paris; Attendance: 5,765; Referees: Belkhiri, Hamidi (ALG)
25 July 2024; 16:00	2× (suspension)	Report	2× (suspension) 1× (red card)	Paris Expo Porte de Versailles, Paris; Attendance: 5,765; Referees: Belkhiri, Hamidi (ALG)

25 July 2024; 21:00	Norway	28–32	Sweden	Paris Expo Porte de Versailles, Paris; Attendance: 5,808; Referees: García, Marín (ESP)
25 July 2024; 21:00	Mørk, Oftedal 7	(17–15)	Hagman 8	Paris Expo Porte de Versailles, Paris; Attendance: 5,808; Referees: García, Marín (ESP)
25 July 2024; 21:00	1× (yellow card) 3× (suspension)	Report	1× (yellow card) 5× (suspension) 1× (red card)	Paris Expo Porte de Versailles, Paris; Attendance: 5,808; Referees: García, Marín (ESP)

28 July 2024; 11:00	South Korea	23–30	Slovenia	Paris Expo Porte de Versailles, Paris; Attendance: 5,819; Referees: Bíró, Kiss (HUN)
28 July 2024; 11:00	Woo 7	(12–14)	Mavsar 7	Paris Expo Porte de Versailles, Paris; Attendance: 5,819; Referees: Bíró, Kiss (HUN)
28 July 2024; 11:00	1× (yellow card) 2× (suspension)	Report	1× (suspension)	Paris Expo Porte de Versailles, Paris; Attendance: 5,819; Referees: Bíró, Kiss (HUN)

28 July 2024; 14:00	Sweden	31–28	Germany	Paris Expo Porte de Versailles, Paris; Attendance: 5,815; Referees: Pavićević, Ražnatović (MNE)
28 July 2024; 14:00	Carlson 7	(19–12)	three players 5	Paris Expo Porte de Versailles, Paris; Attendance: 5,815; Referees: Pavićević, Ražnatović (MNE)
28 July 2024; 14:00	4× (suspension)	Report	3× (suspension)	Paris Expo Porte de Versailles, Paris; Attendance: 5,815; Referees: Pavićević, Ražnatović (MNE)

28 July 2024; 16:00	Denmark	18–27	Norway	Paris Expo Porte de Versailles, Paris; Attendance: 5,815; Referees: C. Bonaventura, J. Bonaventura (FRA)
28 July 2024; 16:00	Østergaard 5	(8–14)	Brattset Dale, Kristiansen 6	Paris Expo Porte de Versailles, Paris; Attendance: 5,815; Referees: C. Bonaventura, J. Bonaventura (FRA)
28 July 2024; 16:00	3× (suspension)	Report	1× (suspension)	Paris Expo Porte de Versailles, Paris; Attendance: 5,815; Referees: C. Bonaventura, J. Bonaventura (FRA)

30 July 2024; 09:00	Germany	41–22	Slovenia	Paris Expo Porte de Versailles, Paris; Attendance: 5,852; Referees: García, Paolantoni (ARG)
30 July 2024; 09:00	Lott, Smits 7	(16–9)	Gros 6	Paris Expo Porte de Versailles, Paris; Attendance: 5,852; Referees: García, Paolantoni (ARG)
30 July 2024; 09:00	1× (yellow card) 4× (suspension)	Report	1× (yellow card) 4× (suspension)	Paris Expo Porte de Versailles, Paris; Attendance: 5,852; Referees: García, Paolantoni (ARG)

30 July 2024; 11:00	Norway	26–20	South Korea	Paris Expo Porte de Versailles, Paris; Attendance: 5,852; Referees: Brunner, Salah (SUI)
30 July 2024; 11:00	Skogrand 5	(13–11)	Ryu 6	Paris Expo Porte de Versailles, Paris; Attendance: 5,852; Referees: Brunner, Salah (SUI)
30 July 2024; 11:00	1× (yellow card) 2× (suspension)	Report	1× (suspension)	Paris Expo Porte de Versailles, Paris; Attendance: 5,852; Referees: Brunner, Salah (SUI)

30 July 2024; 21:00	Sweden	23–25	Denmark	Paris Expo Porte de Versailles, Paris; Attendance: 5,724; Referees: A. Konjičanin, D. Konjičanin (BIH)
30 July 2024; 21:00	Hagman 6	(14–14)	four players 4	Paris Expo Porte de Versailles, Paris; Attendance: 5,724; Referees: A. Konjičanin, D. Konjičanin (BIH)
30 July 2024; 21:00	4× (suspension)	Report	1× (yellow card) 3× (suspension)	Paris Expo Porte de Versailles, Paris; Attendance: 5,724; Referees: A. Konjičanin, D. Konjičanin (BIH)

1 August 2024; 11:00	South Korea	21–27	Sweden	Paris Expo Porte de Versailles, Paris; Attendance: 5,653; Referees: García, Paolantoni (ARG)
1 August 2024; 11:00	Kang K. 5	(11–16)	Lindqvist 5	Paris Expo Porte de Versailles, Paris; Attendance: 5,653; Referees: García, Paolantoni (ARG)
1 August 2024; 11:00	2× (suspension)	Report		Paris Expo Porte de Versailles, Paris; Attendance: 5,653; Referees: García, Paolantoni (ARG)

1 August 2024; 19:00	Germany	27–28	Denmark	Paris Expo Porte de Versailles, Paris; Attendance: 5,722; Referees: Bíró, Kiss (HUN)
1 August 2024; 19:00	Behrend 6	(12–15)	Højlund 7	Paris Expo Porte de Versailles, Paris; Attendance: 5,722; Referees: Bíró, Kiss (HUN)
1 August 2024; 19:00	3× (suspension)	Report	4× (suspension)	Paris Expo Porte de Versailles, Paris; Attendance: 5,722; Referees: Bíró, Kiss (HUN)

1 August 2024; 21:00	Slovenia	22–29	Norway	Paris Expo Porte de Versailles, Paris; Attendance: 5,722; Referees: Belkhiri, Hamidi (ALG)
1 August 2024; 21:00	Gros, Mavsar 5	(10–15)	three players 4	Paris Expo Porte de Versailles, Paris; Attendance: 5,722; Referees: Belkhiri, Hamidi (ALG)
1 August 2024; 21:00	1× (yellow card) 4× (suspension)	Report	2× (suspension) 1× (red card)	Paris Expo Porte de Versailles, Paris; Attendance: 5,722; Referees: Belkhiri, Hamidi (ALG)

3 August 2024; 16:00	Slovenia	23–27	Sweden	Paris Expo Porte de Versailles, Paris; Attendance: 5,801; Referees: Brunner, Salah (SUI)
3 August 2024; 16:00	Omoregie 9	(14–11)	Hagman 5	Paris Expo Porte de Versailles, Paris; Attendance: 5,801; Referees: Brunner, Salah (SUI)
3 August 2024; 16:00	2× (suspension)	Report	1× (suspension)	Paris Expo Porte de Versailles, Paris; Attendance: 5,801; Referees: Brunner, Salah (SUI)

3 August 2024; 19:00	Norway	30–18	Germany	Paris Expo Porte de Versailles, Paris; Attendance: 5,714; Referees: A. Konjičanin, D. Konjičanin (BIH)
3 August 2024; 19:00	Reistad 8	(14–8)	three players 3	Paris Expo Porte de Versailles, Paris; Attendance: 5,714; Referees: A. Konjičanin, D. Konjičanin (BIH)
3 August 2024; 19:00	3× (suspension)	Report	2× (suspension)	Paris Expo Porte de Versailles, Paris; Attendance: 5,714; Referees: A. Konjičanin, D. Konjičanin (BIH)

3 August 2024; 21:00	Denmark	28–20	South Korea	Paris Expo Porte de Versailles, Paris; Attendance: 5,714; Referees: García, Marín (ESP)
3 August 2024; 21:00	Hansen, Jørgensen 6	(12–8)	Woo 5	Paris Expo Porte de Versailles, Paris; Attendance: 5,714; Referees: García, Marín (ESP)
3 August 2024; 21:00	1× (yellow card) 4× (suspension)	Report		Paris Expo Porte de Versailles, Paris; Attendance: 5,714; Referees: García, Marín (ESP)

=== Group B ===
Pos	Team	Pld	W	D	L	GF	GA	GD	Pts	Qualification
1	France (H)	5	5	0	0	159	124	+35	10	Quarterfinals
2	Netherlands	5	4	0	1	152	137	+15	8	Quarterfinals
3	Hungary	5	2	1	2	137	140	−3	5	Quarterfinals
4	Brazil	5	2	0	3	127	119	+8	4	Quarterfinals
5	Angola	5	1	1	3	131	154	−23	3	
6	Spain	5	0	0	5	111	143	−32	0	

Source: Olympics Paris 2024 rankings
Rules for classification: 1) Points; 2) Head-to-head points; 3) Head-to-head goal difference; 4) Head-to-head goals scored; 5) Goal difference; 6) Goals scored; 7) Draw.
(H) Hosts

25 July 2024; 11:00	Netherlands	34–31	Angola	Paris Expo Porte de Versailles, Paris; Attendance: 5,686; Referees: Kuttler, Merz (GER)
25 July 2024; 11:00	Malestein, Polman 8	(19–18)	Nenganga, H. Paulo 6	Paris Expo Porte de Versailles, Paris; Attendance: 5,686; Referees: Kuttler, Merz (GER)
25 July 2024; 11:00	1× (yellow card) 1× (suspension)	Report	3× (suspension)	Paris Expo Porte de Versailles, Paris; Attendance: 5,686; Referees: Kuttler, Merz (GER)

25 July 2024; 14:00	Spain	18–29	Brazil	Paris Expo Porte de Versailles, Paris; Attendance: 5,765; Referees: Kurtagic, Wetterwik (SWE)
25 July 2024; 14:00	López 5	(10–15)	De Paula, Matieli 6	Paris Expo Porte de Versailles, Paris; Attendance: 5,765; Referees: Kurtagic, Wetterwik (SWE)
25 July 2024; 14:00	5× (suspension)	Report	5× (suspension)	Paris Expo Porte de Versailles, Paris; Attendance: 5,765; Referees: Kurtagic, Wetterwik (SWE)

25 July 2024; 19:00	Hungary	28–31	France	Paris Expo Porte de Versailles, Paris; Attendance: 5,808; Referees: García, Paolantoni (ARG)
25 July 2024; 19:00	Kuczora 8	(12–15)	Nze Minko 6	Paris Expo Porte de Versailles, Paris; Attendance: 5,808; Referees: García, Paolantoni (ARG)
25 July 2024; 19:00	1× (suspension)	Report	1× (yellow card) 2× (suspension)	Paris Expo Porte de Versailles, Paris; Attendance: 5,808; Referees: García, Paolantoni (ARG)

28 July 2024; 09:00	Brazil	24–25	Hungary	Paris Expo Porte de Versailles, Paris; Attendance: 5,819; Referees: Jørum, Kleven (NOR)
28 July 2024; 09:00	three players 4	(15–12)	Simon 5	Paris Expo Porte de Versailles, Paris; Attendance: 5,819; Referees: Jørum, Kleven (NOR)
28 July 2024; 09:00	1× (yellow card) 2× (suspension)	Report	3× (suspension)	Paris Expo Porte de Versailles, Paris; Attendance: 5,819; Referees: Jørum, Kleven (NOR)

28 July 2024; 19:00	Angola	26–21	Spain	Paris Expo Porte de Versailles, Paris; Attendance: 5,748; Referees: A. Konjičanin, D. Konjičanin (BIH)
28 July 2024; 19:00	Nenganga 7	(14–15)	Campos 6	Paris Expo Porte de Versailles, Paris; Attendance: 5,748; Referees: A. Konjičanin, D. Konjičanin (BIH)
28 July 2024; 19:00	4× (suspension) 1× (red card)	Report	3× (suspension) 1× (red card)	Paris Expo Porte de Versailles, Paris; Attendance: 5,748; Referees: A. Konjičanin, D. Konjičanin (BIH)

28 July 2024; 21:00	France	32–28	Netherlands	Paris Expo Porte de Versailles, Paris; Attendance: 5,748; Referees: Lah, Sok (SLO)
28 July 2024; 21:00	Valentini 10	(17–14)	Malestein 7	Paris Expo Porte de Versailles, Paris; Attendance: 5,748; Referees: Lah, Sok (SLO)
28 July 2024; 21:00	2× (suspension)	Report	2× (suspension)	Paris Expo Porte de Versailles, Paris; Attendance: 5,748; Referees: Lah, Sok (SLO)

30 July 2024; 14:00	Netherlands	29–24	Spain	Paris Expo Porte de Versailles, Paris; Attendance: 5,834; Referees: Hansen, Madsen (DEN)
30 July 2024; 14:00	Van Wetering 5	(14–12)	Arcos 6	Paris Expo Porte de Versailles, Paris; Attendance: 5,834; Referees: Hansen, Madsen (DEN)
30 July 2024; 14:00	1× (yellow card) 1× (suspension)	Report	1× (yellow card) 2× (suspension)	Paris Expo Porte de Versailles, Paris; Attendance: 5,834; Referees: Hansen, Madsen (DEN)

30 July 2024; 16:00	Hungary	31–31	Angola	Paris Expo Porte de Versailles, Paris; Attendance: 5,834; Referees: Kurtagic, Wetterwik (SWE)
30 July 2024; 16:00	Klujber 9	(15–16)	Kassoma 9	Paris Expo Porte de Versailles, Paris; Attendance: 5,834; Referees: Kurtagic, Wetterwik (SWE)
30 July 2024; 16:00	1× (yellow card) 2× (suspension)	Report	2× (suspension)	Paris Expo Porte de Versailles, Paris; Attendance: 5,834; Referees: Kurtagic, Wetterwik (SWE)

30 July 2024; 19:00	France	26–20	Brazil	Paris Expo Porte de Versailles, Paris; Attendance: 5,724; Referees: Kuttler, Merz (GER)
30 July 2024; 19:00	Foppa 7	(14–11)	De Paula 7	Paris Expo Porte de Versailles, Paris; Attendance: 5,724; Referees: Kuttler, Merz (GER)
30 July 2024; 19:00	2× (suspension)	Report	3× (suspension)	Paris Expo Porte de Versailles, Paris; Attendance: 5,724; Referees: Kuttler, Merz (GER)

1 August 2024; 09:00	Netherlands	31–24	Brazil	Paris Expo Porte de Versailles, Paris; Attendance: 5,653; Referees: A. Konjičanin, D. Konjičanin (BIH)
1 August 2024; 09:00	Van Wetering 6	(17–13)	Bitolo 7	Paris Expo Porte de Versailles, Paris; Attendance: 5,653; Referees: A. Konjičanin, D. Konjičanin (BIH)
1 August 2024; 09:00	1× (suspension)	Report	3× (suspension) 1× (red card)	Paris Expo Porte de Versailles, Paris; Attendance: 5,653; Referees: A. Konjičanin, D. Konjičanin (BIH)

1 August 2024; 14:00	Spain	24–27	Hungary	Paris Expo Porte de Versailles, Paris; Attendance: 5,816; Referees: Kuttler, Merz (GER)
1 August 2024; 14:00	Cabral 6	(12–14)	Klujber 6	Paris Expo Porte de Versailles, Paris; Attendance: 5,816; Referees: Kuttler, Merz (GER)
1 August 2024; 14:00	1× (yellow card) 2× (suspension)	Report	3× (suspension)	Paris Expo Porte de Versailles, Paris; Attendance: 5,816; Referees: Kuttler, Merz (GER)

1 August 2024; 16:00	Angola	24–38	France	Paris Expo Porte de Versailles, Paris; Attendance: 5,816; Referees: Jørum, Kleven (NOR)
1 August 2024; 16:00	three players 5	(14–18)	Kanor 7	Paris Expo Porte de Versailles, Paris; Attendance: 5,816; Referees: Jørum, Kleven (NOR)
1 August 2024; 16:00	2× (suspension) 1× (red card)	Report	1× (suspension)	Paris Expo Porte de Versailles, Paris; Attendance: 5,816; Referees: Jørum, Kleven (NOR)

3 August 2024; 09:00	Hungary	26–30	Netherlands	Paris Expo Porte de Versailles, Paris; Attendance: 5,841; Referees: C. Bonaventura, J. Bonaventura (FRA)
3 August 2024; 09:00	Győri-Lukács, Klujber 5	(16–19)	Abbingh 7	Paris Expo Porte de Versailles, Paris; Attendance: 5,841; Referees: C. Bonaventura, J. Bonaventura (FRA)
3 August 2024; 09:00	1× (yellow card) 4× (suspension)	Report	3× (suspension)	Paris Expo Porte de Versailles, Paris; Attendance: 5,841; Referees: C. Bonaventura, J. Bonaventura (FRA)

3 August 2024; 11:00	Spain	24–32	France	Paris Expo Porte de Versailles, Paris; Attendance: 5,841; Referees: Kuttler, Merz (GER)
3 August 2024; 11:00	Cabral 5	(9–17)	Toublanc 6	Paris Expo Porte de Versailles, Paris; Attendance: 5,841; Referees: Kuttler, Merz (GER)
3 August 2024; 11:00	1× (yellow card) 4× (suspension)	Report	1× (suspension)	Paris Expo Porte de Versailles, Paris; Attendance: 5,841; Referees: Kuttler, Merz (GER)

3 August 2024; 14:00	Brazil	30–19	Angola	Paris Expo Porte de Versailles, Paris; Attendance: 5,801; Referees: Lah, Sok (SLO)
3 August 2024; 14:00	Bitolo 7	(14–6)	Pascoal 4	Paris Expo Porte de Versailles, Paris; Attendance: 5,801; Referees: Lah, Sok (SLO)
3 August 2024; 14:00	1× (yellow card) 2× (suspension)	Report	2× (yellow card) 1× (suspension)	Paris Expo Porte de Versailles, Paris; Attendance: 5,801; Referees: Lah, Sok (SLO)

== Knockout stage ==
=== Bracket ===
Quarterfinals
6 August
Norway	32
Brazil	15
6 August
Denmark	29
Netherlands	25
6 August
Hungary	32
Sweden (ET)	36
6 August
France	26
Germany	23

Semifinals
8 August
Norway	25
Denmark	21
8 August
Sweden	28
France (ET)	31

Gold medal
10 August
Norway	29
France	21
Bronze medal
10 August
Denmark	30
Sweden	25

=== Quarterfinals ===
6 August 2024; 09:30	Denmark	29–25	Netherlands	Stade Pierre-Mauroy, Lille; Attendance: 20,372; Referees: Kurtagic, Wetterwik (SWE)
6 August 2024; 09:30	Friis, Hansen 6	(11–10)	Housheer, Van Wetering 7	Stade Pierre-Mauroy, Lille; Attendance: 20,372; Referees: Kurtagic, Wetterwik (SWE)
6 August 2024; 09:30	5× (suspension) 1× (red card)	Report	5× (suspension)	Stade Pierre-Mauroy, Lille; Attendance: 20,372; Referees: Kurtagic, Wetterwik (SWE)

6 August 2024; 13:30	France	26–23	Germany	Stade Pierre-Mauroy, Lille; Attendance: 26,548; Referees: Jørum, Kleven (NOR)
6 August 2024; 13:30	Horacek 7	(13–10)	Bölk 7	Stade Pierre-Mauroy, Lille; Attendance: 26,548; Referees: Jørum, Kleven (NOR)
6 August 2024; 13:30	1× (yellow card) 1× (suspension)	Report	2× (suspension)	Stade Pierre-Mauroy, Lille; Attendance: 26,548; Referees: Jørum, Kleven (NOR)

6 August 2024
17:30
Hungary
32–36 (ET)
Sweden
Stade Pierre-Mauroy, Lille
Attendance: 22,408
Referees: A. Konjičanin, D. Konjičanin (BIH)
Klujber 11
(15–16)
Koppang 7
1× (yellow card) 3× (suspension)
Report
4× (suspension)

FT: 29–29 ET: 3–7

6 August 2024; 21:30	Norway	32–15	Brazil	Stade Pierre-Mauroy, Lille; Attendance: 21,522; Referees: Kuttler, Merz (GER)
6 August 2024; 21:30	Jacobsen 6	(16–8)	De Paula, Guarieiro 3	Stade Pierre-Mauroy, Lille; Attendance: 21,522; Referees: Kuttler, Merz (GER)
6 August 2024; 21:30	1× (yellow card)	Report	1× (yellow card) 2× (suspension)	Stade Pierre-Mauroy, Lille; Attendance: 21,522; Referees: Kuttler, Merz (GER)

=== Semifinals ===
8 August 2024
16:30
Sweden
28–31 (ET)
France
Stade Pierre-Mauroy, Lille
Attendance: 24,688
Referees: Kuttler, Merz (GER)
Hagman 6
(12–10)
Horacek 8
3× (suspension)
Report
1× (yellow card) 5× (suspension)

FT: 25–25 ET: 3–6

8 August 2024; 21:30	Norway	25–21	Denmark	Stade Pierre-Mauroy, Lille; Attendance: 15,975; Referees: Lah, Sok (SLO)
8 August 2024; 21:30	Brattset Dale 4	(11–8)	Jørgensen 4	Stade Pierre-Mauroy, Lille; Attendance: 15,975; Referees: Lah, Sok (SLO)
8 August 2024; 21:30	1× (yellow card) 3× (suspension)	Report	1× (yellow card) 3× (suspension)	Stade Pierre-Mauroy, Lille; Attendance: 15,975; Referees: Lah, Sok (SLO)

=== Bronze medal game ===
10 August 2024; 10:00	Denmark	30–25	Sweden	Stade Pierre-Mauroy, Lille; Attendance: 13,179; Referees: Jørum, Kleven (NOR)
10 August 2024; 10:00	Højlund 5	(15–13)	Hagman 5	Stade Pierre-Mauroy, Lille; Attendance: 13,179; Referees: Jørum, Kleven (NOR)
10 August 2024; 10:00	1× (yellow card) 4× (suspension)	Report	1× (yellow card) 3× (suspension)	Stade Pierre-Mauroy, Lille; Attendance: 13,179; Referees: Jørum, Kleven (NOR)

=== Gold medal game ===
10 August 2024; 15:00	Norway	29–21	France	Stade Pierre-Mauroy, Lille; Attendance: 26,664; Referees: García, Marín (ESP)
10 August 2024; 15:00	Reistad 8	(15–13)	Kanor 5	Stade Pierre-Mauroy, Lille; Attendance: 26,664; Referees: García, Marín (ESP)
10 August 2024; 15:00	3× (suspension)	Report	1× (yellow card)	Stade Pierre-Mauroy, Lille; Attendance: 26,664; Referees: García, Marín (ESP)

== Ranking and statistics ==
=== Final ranking ===
Rank	Team
1st place, gold medalist(s)	Norway
2nd place, silver medalist(s)	France
3rd place, bronze medalist(s)	Denmark
4	Sweden
5	Netherlands
6	Hungary
7	Brazil
8	Germany
9	Angola
10	South Korea
11	Slovenia
12	Spain

=== All Star Team ===
The all-star team was announced on 10 August 2024.

Position	Player
Goalkeeper	(France) Laura Glauser
Right wing	(France) Alicia Toublanc
Right back	(Hungary) Katrin Klujber
Centre back	(Norway) Stine Bredal Oftedal
Left back	(France) Estelle Nze Minko
Left wing	(Denmark) Emma Friis
Pivot	(Norway) Kari Brattset Dale
MVP	(Norway) Katrine Lunde

=== Top goalscorers ===
Rank	Name	Goals	Shots	%
1	(Sweden) Nathalie Hagman	41	59	69
2	(France) Tamara Horacek	40	55	73
3	(Hungary) Katrin Klujber	38	66	58
4	(Netherlands) Angela Malestein	34	52	65
5	(Denmark) Emma Friis	31	44	70
6	(Netherlands) Dione Housheer	30	58	52
6	(Denmark) Kristina Jørgensen	30	55	55
6	(France) Estelle Nze Minko	30	49	61
6	(Sweden) Jamina Roberts	30	53	57
10	(Norway) Kari Brattset Dale	29	37	78

Source: Olympics Paris 2024 goalscorers

=== Top goalkeepers ===
Rank	Name	%	Saves	Shots
1	(Norway) Katrine Lunde	42	79	188
2	(Sweden) Evelina Eriksson	38	30	80
3	(Sweden) Johanna Bundsen	36	93	257
3	(Brazil) Gabriela Moreschi	36	70	193
3	(Denmark) Althea Reinhardt	36	52	143
3	(Norway) Silje Solberg-Østhassel	36	32	88
7	(Denmark) Sandra Toft	35	46	133
8	(France) Hatadou Sako	34	31	91
9	(France) Laura Glauser	32	63	197
9	(Netherlands) Yara ten Holte	32	53	167

Source: Olympics Paris 2024 goalkeepers

== Medalists ==
Gold	Silver	Bronze
Norway Veronica Kristiansen; Maren Nyland Aardahl; Stine Skogrand; Nora Mørk; Stine Bredal Oftedal (c); Silje Solberg-Østhassel (GK); Kari Brattset Dale; Kristine Breistøl; Vilde Ingstad; Katrine Lunde (GK); Marit Røsberg Jacobsen; Camilla Herrem; Sanna Solberg-Isaksen; Henny Reistad; Thale Rushfeldt Deila Head coach: Þórir Hergeirsson	France Laura Glauser (GK); Méline Nocandy; Alicia Toublanc; Chloé Valentini; Coralie Lassource; Grâce Zaadi; Cléopâtre Darleux (GK); Laura Flippes; Orlane Kanor; Tamara Horacek; Pauletta Foppa; Estelle Nze Minko (c); Oriane Ondono; Lucie Granier; Sarah Bouktit; Léna Grandveau; Hatadou Sako (GK) Head coach: Olivier Krumbholz	Denmark Sandra Toft (c) (GK); Sarah Iversen; Helena Elver; Anne Mette Hansen; Kathrine Heindahl; Line Haugsted; Althea Reinhardt (GK); Mette Tranborg; Kristina Jørgensen; Trine Østergaard; Louise Burgaard; Mie Højlund; Emma Friis; Rikke Iversen; Michala Møller Head coach: Jesper Jensen
