= Sabrina Novotná =

Czech handball player

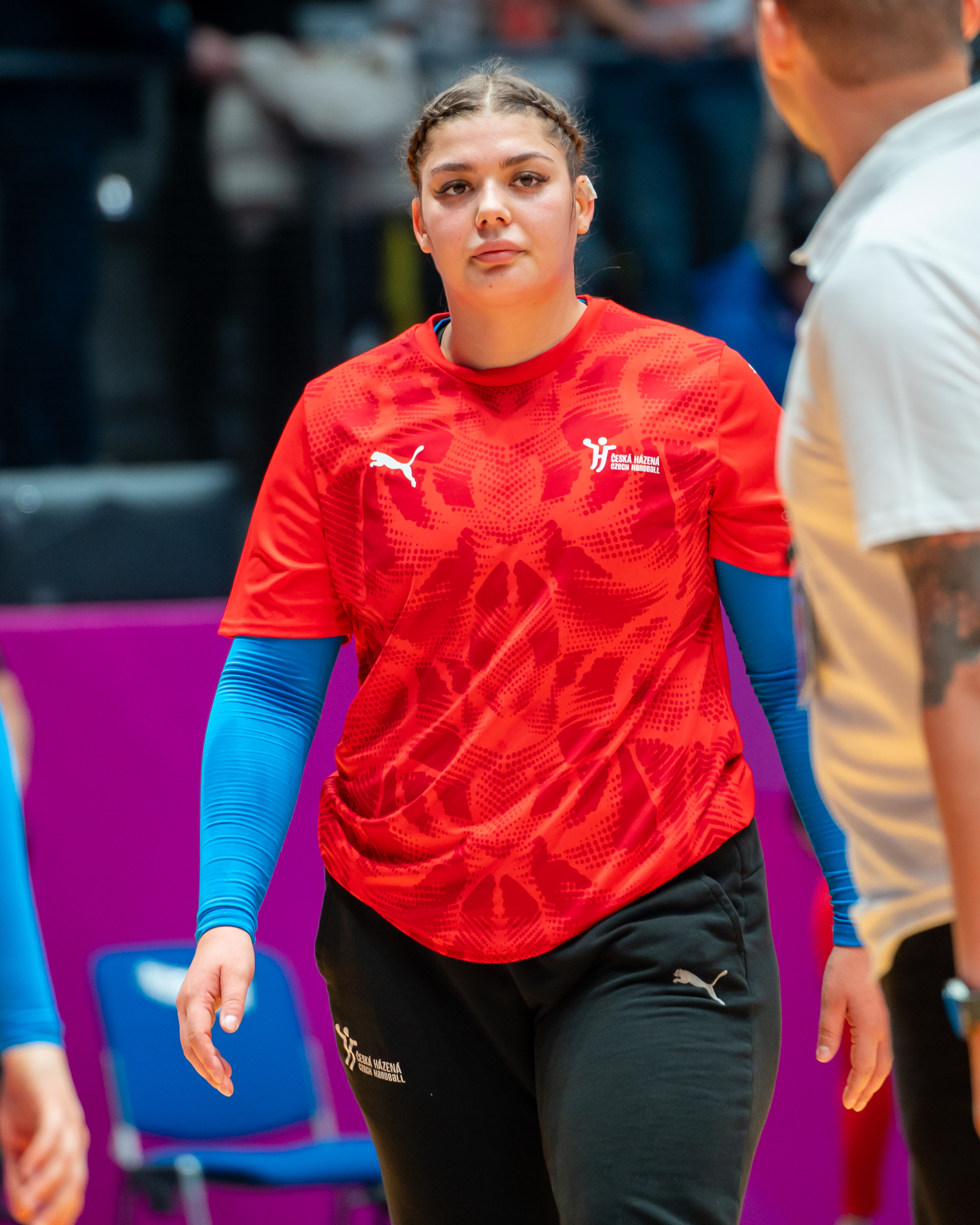

Personal information
- Nationality: Czech
- Born: 2 July 2000 (age 26) Prague, Czech Republic
- Height: 1.83 m (6 ft 0 in)

Sport
- Sport: Handball
- Position: Goalkeeper
- Current club: Metz Handball
- Number: 79

Youth career
- Years: Team
- –: DHK Banik Most

Senior clubs
- Years: Team
- –2019: DHK Banik Most
- 2019–2021: HK Slovan Duslo Šaľa
- 2021–2025: Házená Kynžvart
- 2025–: Metz Handball
National team
Years	Team	Apps	(Gls)
–	Czech Republic	45	(2)
- Updated on 29 October 2025

Sabrina Novotná (born 2 July 2000) is a Czech handball player for Metz Handball and the Czech national team.

She represented the Czech Republic at the 2020 European Women's Handball Championship and the 2024 European Women's Handball Championship.
