= Lysa Tchaptchet =

Handball player (born 2001)

Personal information
- Full name: Lysa Tchaptchet Defo
- Nationality: Cameroonian, Spanish
- Born: 20 December 2001 (age 24) Yaoundé, Cameroon
- Height: 1.85 m (6 ft 1 in)

Sport
- Sport: Handball
- Position: Pivot
- Current club: Ferencvárosi TC
- Number: 20

Youth career
- Years: Team
- –: CD Beti Onak

Senior clubs
- Years: Team
- 2019–2021: CB Elche
- 2021–2024: Vipers Kristiansand
- 2024–2026: Odense Håndbold
- 2026–: Ferencvárosi TC
National team
Years	Team	Apps	(Gls)
2020–	Spain	56	(72)
- Updated on 26 August 2024

Lysa Tchaptchet Defo (born 20 December 2001) is a professional handballer who plays as a pivot for Ferencvárosi TC. Born in Cameroon, she moved to Spain at the age of 5, and she represents Spain at international level.

Tchaptchet represented Spain at the 2020 European Women's Handball Championship.

== Career ==
Tchaptchet began playing handball at CD Beti Onak. In 2019 she joined top league team CB Elche. Here she played for 2 seasons before joining Norwegian team.Vipers Kristiansand. Here she won the Norwegian championship three times; in 2022, 2023 and 2024 and the EHF Champions League in 2022 and 2023. In 2024 she transferred to Danish side Odense Håndbold. In the 2024-25 season, she achieved a perfect regular season with Odense Håndbold, winning 26 of 26 games. Later the same season she won the Danish Championship, when Odense beat Team Esbjerg in the final 2-1 in matches. In the summer of 2026 she joined Ferencvárosi TC.

She debuted for the Spanish national team on November 27th 2020.

== Private life ==
Her younger sister, Lyndie Tchaptchet, also plays handball in the Spanish National handball team.

== Achievements ==
- EHF Champions League:
  - Winner: 2021/2022, 2022/2023
  - Silver: 2024/2025
- Norwegian League:
  - Winner: 2021/2022, 2022/2023, 2023/2024
- Norwegian Cup:
  - Winner: 2021, 2022/23, 2023/2024
- Danish League:
  - Gold: 2025
  - Silver: 2026
