= Méline Nocandy =

French handball player (born 1998)

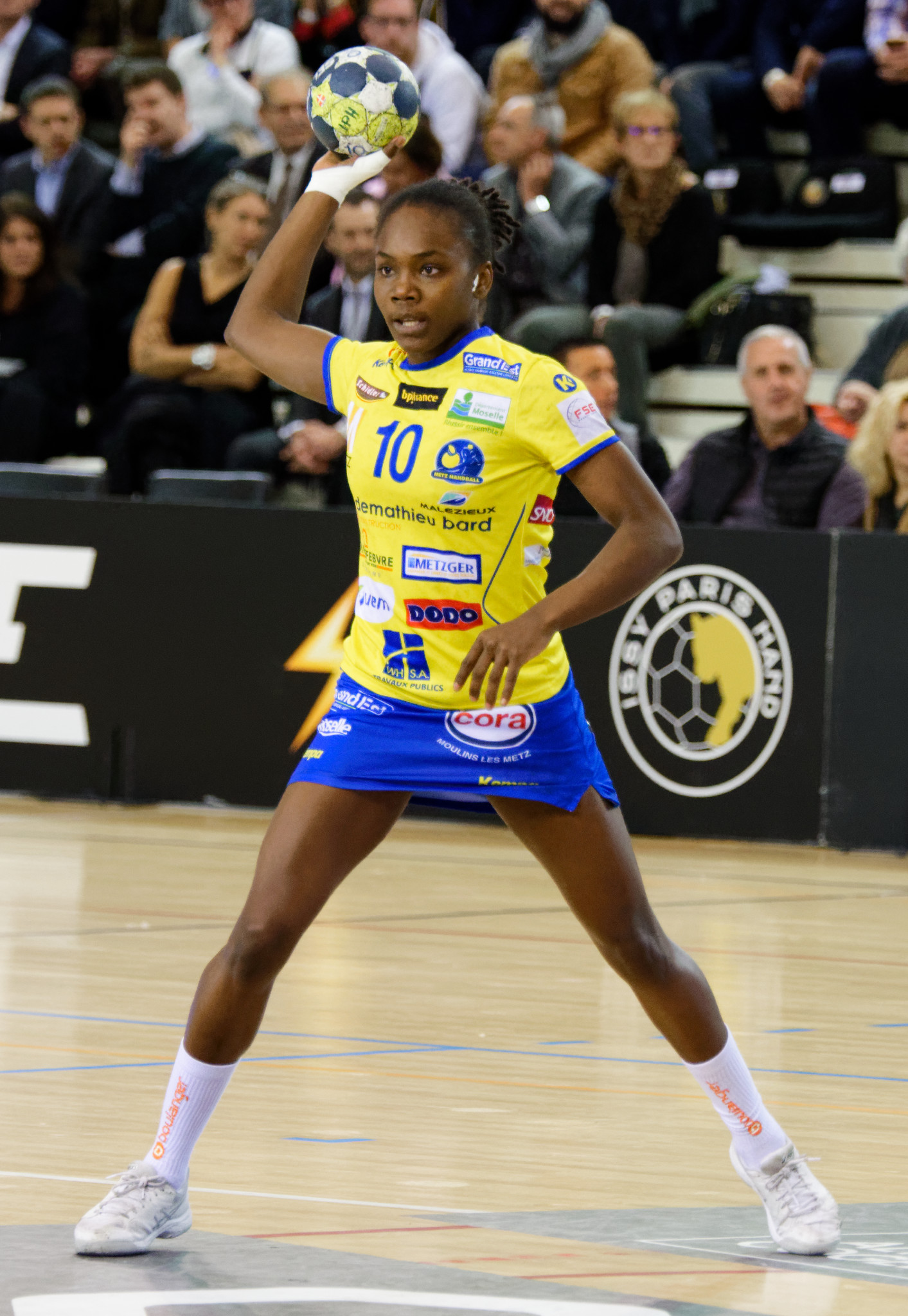
- Nocandy in 2018

Personal information
- Nationality: French
- Born: 25 February 1998 (age 28) Saint-Claude, Guadeloupe
- Height: 1.75 m (5 ft 9 in)

Sport
- Sport: Handball
- Position: Centre back
- Current club: Brest Bretagne Handball
- Number: 25

Youth career
- Years: Team
- –2015: Zayan LA
- 2015–2016: Metz Handball

Senior clubs
- Years: Team
- 2016–2022: Metz Handball
- 2022–2024: Paris 92
- 2024–: Brest Bretagne Handball
National team
Years	Team	Apps	(Gls)
2019–	France	86	(166)
Medal record
Olympic Games
Gold medal – first place	2020 Tokyo	Team
Silver medal – second place	2024 Paris	Team
World Championship
Gold medal – first place	2023 Denmark/Norway/Sweden
Silver medal – second place	2021 Spain
Bronze medal – third place	2025 Germany/Netherlands
European Championship
Silver medal – second place	2020 Denmark
Junior European Championship
Gold medal – first place	2017 Slovenia
- Updated on 26 October 2025

Méline Nocandy (born 25 February 1998) is a French handballer for Brest Bretagne Handball and the French national team. She is a World Champion from 2023 and an Olympic champion from 2021.

== Club career ==
Nocandy played on Guadeloupe based team Zayen La. In 2015 she joined Metz Handball. She started at Metz' B-team and was later promoted to the first team.

With Metz she won the French championship every year from 2016 to 2019 and again in 2022. She also won the 2017, 2019 and 2022 French Cup.

In 2022 she joined league rivals Paris 92. In September 2022 she had a knee injury that kept her out for several months.

In 2024 she joined Brest Bretagne Handball.

== International career ==
Nocandy played for the French youth team, where she won the U-19 World Championship in 2017. In the final she was named player of the match.

Nocandy was included in the French Golden League 2019 team to replace the injured Grâce Zaadi, where she debuted for French national team on 21 March 2019 against Romania.

She represented France at the 2019 World Championship, where France finished on a disappointing 13th place. She played 7 games, scoring 14 goals.

A year later she won a silver medal at the 2020 European Championship.

At the 2021 Olympics she won gold medals with the French team. She scored 15 goals at the tournament. For this win she was named a Chevalier of the French Legion of Honour. Later the same year she won silver medals at the 2021 World Championship.

In 2023 she won the 2023 World Championship.

At the 2024 Olympics she won silver medals with the French team.

At the 2025 World Championship she was injured during the tournament and was replaced by Lilou Pintat. She was readmitted into the team for the quarterfinal. France went on to win bronze medals losing to Germany in the semifinal and beating Netherlands in extra time in the third place playoff.

== Achievements ==
- EHF Champions League:
  - Bronze: 2022 (with Metz Handball)
- French league (Division 1 Féminine):
  - Winner (gold) : 2016, 2017, 2018, 2019 and 2022 (with Metz Handball)
  - Tied 1st: 2020 (with Metz Handball)
  - Runner up: 2021 (with Metz Handball)
- French Division 3 (Championnat de France de Nationale 1):
  - Winner (gold) : 2015 (with Zayan LA; youth team)
- French Cup (Coupe de France):
  - Winner (gold) : 2017, 2019 and 2022 (with Metz Handball)
  - Runner up: 2023 (with Paris 92)

France

- Olympic Games:
  - 2020: Gold
- World Championship:
  - 2021: Silver
  - 2023: Gold
  - 2025: Gold
- European Championship:
  - 2020: Silver

France U19

- U-19 European Handball Championship:
  - 2017: Gold

Individual

- French Championship
  - Hope of the Season: 2018-2019
- Inducted into the Legion of Honor with the rank of Chevalier: 2021
