= Anna Albek =

Hungarian handball player (born 2001)

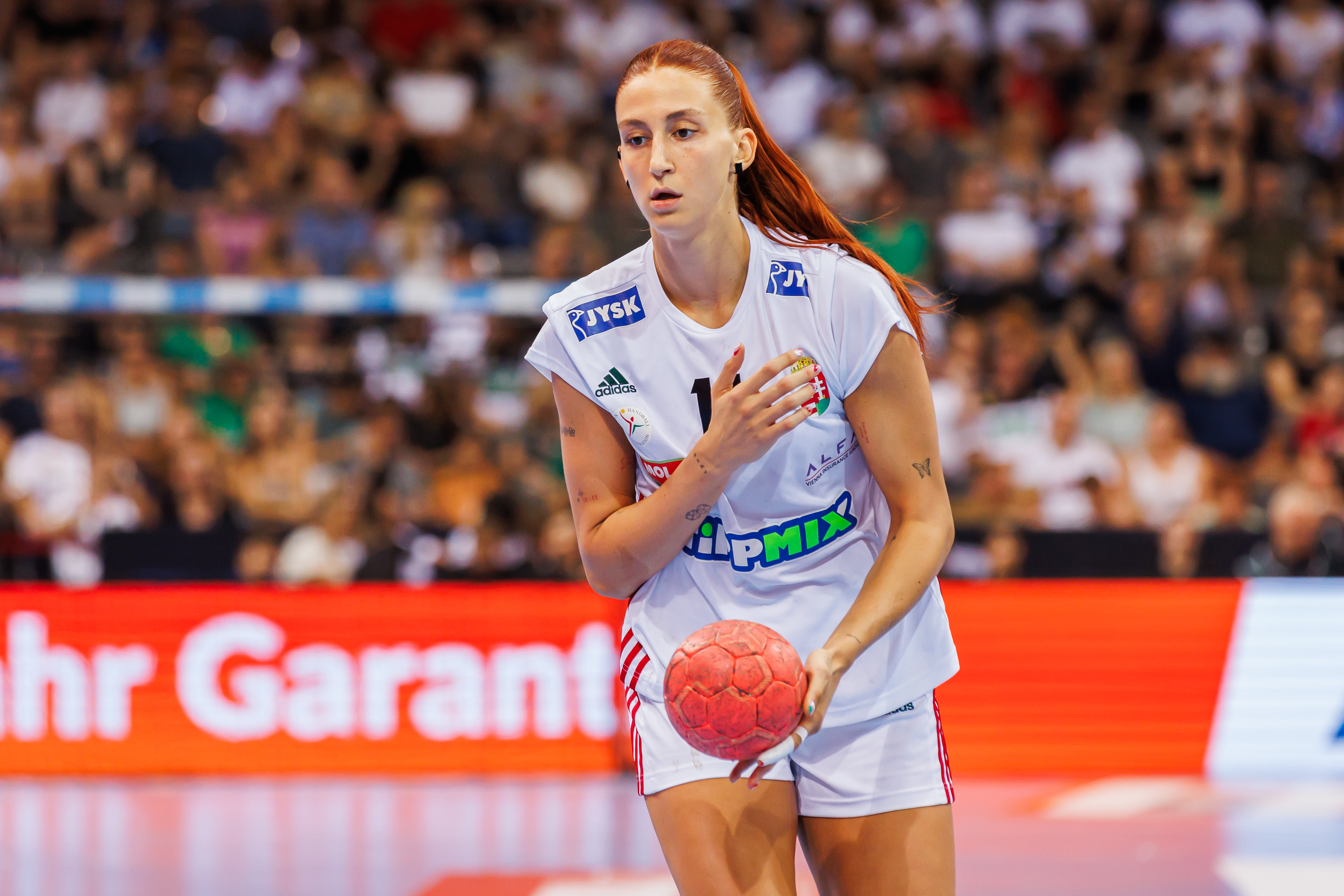

Personal information
- Nationality: Hungarian
- Born: 2 December 2001 (age 24) Senta, Serbia
- Height: 1.88 m (6 ft 2 in)

Sport
- Sport: Handball
- Current club: Metz Handball
- Number: 6

Senior clubs
- Years: Team
- 2016–2020: (Austria) Grazer AK
- 2020–2022: (Germany) TuS Metzingen
- 2022–2025: (Hungary) Mosonmagyaróvári KC SE
- 2025–: (France) Metz Handball
National team
Years	Team	Apps	(Gls)
2021–	Hungary	51	(79)
Medal record
Junior European Championship
Gold medal – first place	2019 Hungary
- Updated on 10 December 2025

Anna Albek (born 2 December 2001) is a Hungarian handballer for Metz Handball and the Hungary national team.

She represented Hungary at two World Championship (2021, 2023) tournaments. She also represented Hungary at the 2024 Summer Olympics.

Her brother, József is a professional handball player as well, and represents Austria on international level.

Between 2014 and 2016 she was part of the National Academy of Handball.
