= Lilou Pintat =

French handball player (born 2005)

Personal information
- Full name: Lilou Pintat
- Nationality: French
- Born: 9 November 2004 (age 21) Saint-Dizier, France
- Height: 1.75 m (5 ft 9 in)

Sport
- Sport: Handball
- Position: Line player
- Current club: Metz Handball
- Number: 46

Senior clubs
- Years: Team
- 2023–2026: Jeanne d'Arc Dijon Handball
- 2026–: Metz Handball
National team
Years	Team	Apps	(Gls)
2025–	France	11	(7)
Medal record
World Championship
Bronze medal – third place	2025 Germany/Netherlands

Lilou Pintat (born 9 November 2004) is a French professional handballer for Metz Handball in the LFH Division 1 Féminine and the French national team.

She represented the French national team at the 2025 World Women's Handball Championship in Netherlands and Germany, winning her first bronze medal with the national team. She was supped in mid-tournament, replacing Méline Nocandy.

Pintat also won gold at the 2024 IHF Women's U20 Handball World Championship in North Macedonia. She was also included in the official All-Star team of the tournament as best line player.

On 21 November 2025, she signed a two-year contract with French powerhouse Metz Handball.

== Achievements ==
- Women's EHF European League:
  - Winner: 2026
  - Bronze Medalist: 2025
- French Women's First League Championship:
  - Bronze Medalist: 2025
- French Women's Cup Championship:
  - Finalist: 2024, 2026
