= Metz Handball =

Sports club in Metz, France

- Full name: Metz Handball
- Short name: Metz HB
- Founded: 1965
- Arena: Les Arènes
- Capacity: 4,500 / 5,000
- President: Thierry Weizman
- Head coach: Emmanuel Mayonnade
- League: Ligue Butagaz Énergie
- 2025–26: 2nd
- Club colours
Home	Away

Metz Handball is a French handball club from Metz, France. Founded in 1965 under the name ASPTT Metz, the club has an exceptional track record with some 50 titles won, which is the all-time record for a French women's team sport. Chaired by Thierry Weizman since 2005, the team has consistently played in the EHF Champions League and reached the Final4 five times, peaking with the EHF Champions League trophy in 2026.

The men's team also played in 1st League between 1971 and 1983, and nowadays plays in Nationale 1 (3rd division) since 2020.

Location of Metz Handball

== History ==
Over the past few decades, Metz Handball has become the most prestigious women's handball club in France. It is also one of the oldest institutions playing in the French elite.

The club was created in 1965 under the name of ASPTT Metz, but it wasn't until 1968, with the creation of the women's team, that the club became well-known in the sport.

Second-place finishers in France and semi-finalists in the Cup of Cups in 1977, the men's team gave ASPTT Metz its first prestige on a major stage. But in the shadow of the men's team, the women's team progressed year after year until being promoted in 1986 to France's top tier, without being relegated since. The coach of the team at that time was Frenchman Olivier Krumbholz, who later became the successful national manager for France. Since the promotion, Metz HB has had overwhelming success with 24 National Championships from 1989 to 2022, which is the all-time record in the French Women's First League Championship.

Metz Handball is progressively establishing itself as a strong place in European handball. A first epic saw the Dragonnes reach the semi-final of the Cup Winners Cup in 1999. They then became famous in the EHF Cup where, after several quarter finals, they played a first European final in 2013 but did not manage to win the title. The following seasons, the club gains momentum and shines in the Champions League. Unlucky quarter-finalists in 2017 and 2018, Metz participated for the first time in the Final 4 of Europe's most prestigious competition in 2019, where they finished fourth.

After a season without any trophy in 2021, Metz Handball won a 24th French Championship title, a 10th French Cup, and had a flawless record in the Ligue Butagaz Énergie: 26 victories in 26 games. For the second time in its history, the Dragonnes participated in the Final 4 of the Women's EHF Champions League and won their first European medal by finishing third. 4 years later they won the tournament for the first time.

=== Name ===
- 1967–2002: ASPTT Metz
- 2002–2005: Handball Metz Métropole
- 2005–2009: Handball Metz Moselle Lorraine
- 2009–: Metz Handball

== Results ==
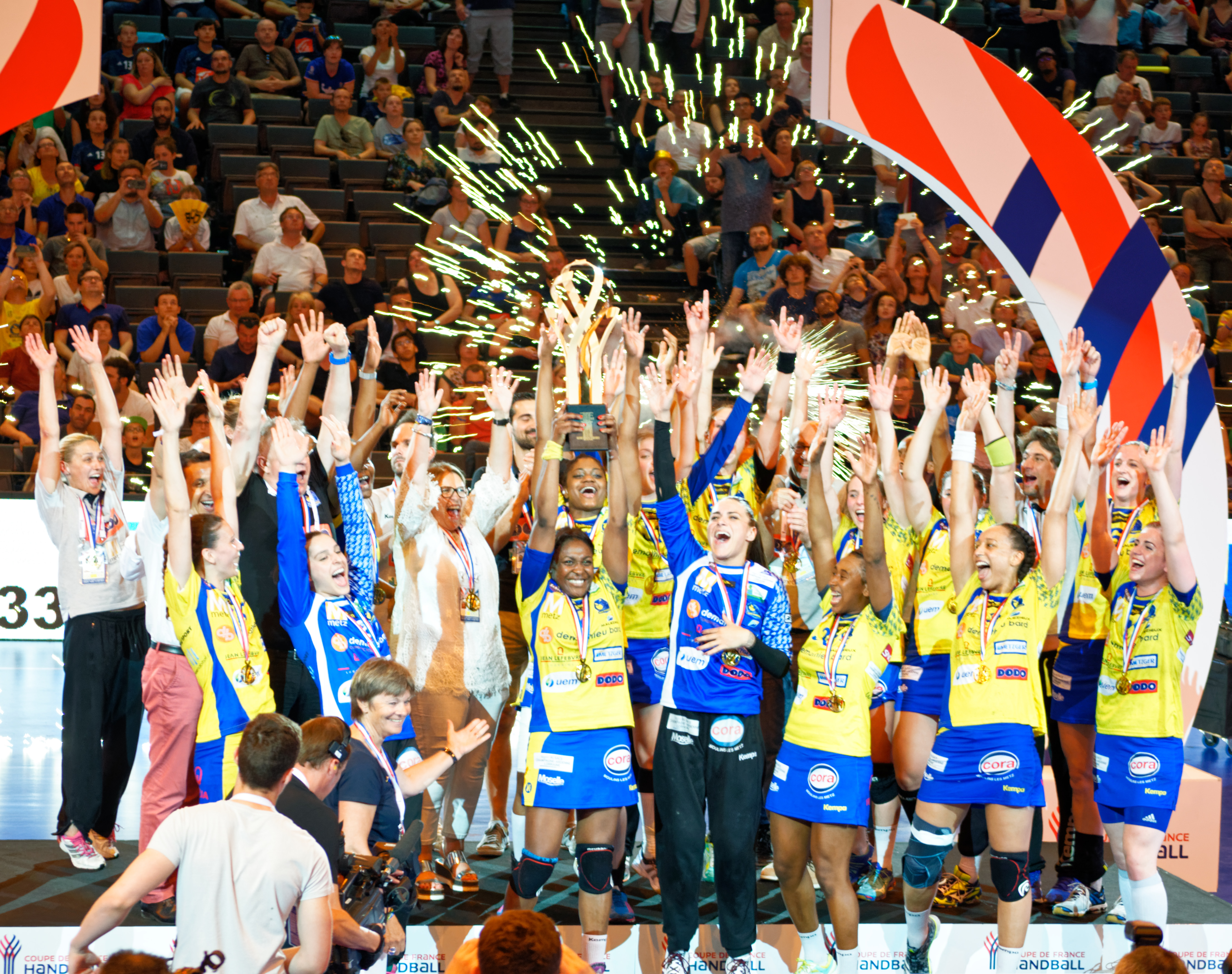
Metz wins Coupe de France 2017, against Issy Paris Hand

National competitions

- French Championship:
  - Winners (27): 1989, 1990, 1993, 1994, 1995, 1996, 1997, 1999, 2000, 2002, 2004, 2005, 2006, 2007, 2008, 2009, 2011, 2013, 2014, 2016, 2017, 2018, 2019, 2022, 2023, 2024, 2025
  - Runners-up (9): 1991, 1992, 1998, 2001, 2003, 2012, 2015, 2021, 2026
- French Cup:
  - Winners (14): 1990, 1994, 1998, 1999, 2010, 2013, 2014, 2017, 2019, 2022, 2023, 2024, 2025, 2026
  - Runners-up (7): 1987, 1992, 1993, 2001, 2005, 2009, 2018
- French League Cup:
  - Winners (8): 2005, 2006, 2007, 2008, 2009, 2010, 2011, 2014
  - Runners-up (1): 2004

International competitions

- EHF Cup (C3):
  - Silver: 2013
- EHF Cup Winners' Cup (C2):
  - Semi-finalist: 1999, 2004, 2010, 2011
- EHF Champions League (C1):
  - Gold: 2026
  - Bronze: 2022
  - Fourth place: 2019, 2024, 2025
  - Quarterfinalists: 2017, 2018, 2021, 2023

== European record ==
Record
Season	Competition	Round	Club	Home	Away	Aggregate
2026–27	EHF Champions League	Group stage Group B	(Hungary) Győri Audi ETO KC		34–34	1st
2026–27	EHF Champions League	Group stage Group B	(Denmark) Odense Håndbold	33–31	31–42	1st
2026–27	EHF Champions League	Group stage Group B	(Romania) CS Gloria Bistrița	40–26		1st
2026–27	EHF Champions League	Group stage Group B	(Croatia) HC Podravka Vegeta		24–35	1st
2026–27	EHF Champions League	Group stage Group B	(Norway) Storhamar HE		23–32	1st
2026–27	EHF Champions League	Group stage Group B	(Germany) HSG Blomberg-Lippe	32–22		1st
2026–27	EHF Champions League	Group stage Group B	(Denmark) Nykøbing Falster	36–25		1st

== Team ==
=== Current squad ===
Squad for the 2026-27 season

Goalkeepers

- 1 (Brazil) Gabriela Moreschi
- 41 (Brazil) Manuella Antunes Navarro
- 79 (Czech Republic) Sabrina Novotná

Winger players
LW

- 6 (France) Chloé Valentini (c)
- 10 (France) Suzanne Wajoka

RW

- 28 (France) Lucie Granier
- 98 (France) Manon Errard

Line players

- 19 (France) Lilou Pintat
- 24 (Spain) Lyndie Tchaptchet

Back players
LB

- 14 (France) Yvana Atangana
- 18 (Denmark) Kristina Jørgensen
- 23 (Republic of the Congo) Betchaïdelle Ngombele

CB

- 29 (France) Léna Grandveau
- 38 (Hungary) Petra Vámos
- 76 (France) Lylou Borg

RB

- 11 (Hungary) Anna Albek
- 20 (France) Laura Schneider

Information of players out on loan
No.	Nat.	Player	Position	Date of Birth	Since	Loan until	Current club
2	(France)	Claire Koestner	Centre Back	10 February 2006	1 July 2025	30 June 2027	(France) Saint-Amand

Squad information
No.	Nat.	Player	Position	Date of Birth	In	Contract until	Previous club
1	(Brazil)	Gabriela Moreschi	Goalkeeper	8 July 1994	2026	2029	(Romania) CSM București
6	(France)	Chloé Valentini	Left Wing	19 April 1995	2021	2027	(France) ESBF Besançon
10	(France)	Suzanne Wajoka	Left Wing	2 January 2001	2025	2030	(France) ESBF Besançon
11	(Hungary)	Anna Albek	Right Back	2 December 2001	2025	2027	(Hungary) Mosonmagyaróvári KC SE
14	(France)	Yvana Atangana	Left Back	17 September 2006	2026	2029	
18	(Denmark)	Kristina Jørgensen	Centre Back	17 January 1998	2026	2029	(Hungary) Győri ETO KC
19	(France)	Lilou Pintat	Line Player	9 November 2004	2026	2028	(France) JDA Dijon Handball
20	(France)	Laura Schneider	Right Back	13 December 1994	2024	2027	(Romania) CSM București
23	(Republic of the Congo)	Betchaïdelle Ngombele	Left Back	23 March 2004	2025	2027	(Slovenia) RK Krim
24	(Spain)	Lyndie Tchaptchet	Line Player	13 January 2005	2026	2028	(Spain) BM Bera Bera
28	(France)	Lucie Granier	Right Wing	11 June 1999	2023	2030	(France) ESBF Besançon
29	(France)	Léna Grandveau	Centre Back	21 January 2003	2024	2027	(France) Neptunes de Nantes
38	(Hungary)	Petra Vámos	Centre Back	14 September 2000	2024	2027	(Hungary) DVSC Schaeffler
76	(France)	Lylou Borg	Centre Back	31 May 2005	2025	2027	(France) Mérignac Handball
79	(Czech Republic)	Sabrina Novotná	Goalkeeper	2 July 2000	2025	2027	(Czech Republic) Házená Kynžvart
98	(France)	Manon Errard	Right Wing	9 February 2005	2024	2028	

=== Transfers ===
Transfers for the 2027–28 season

Joining

- (France) Floriane André (GK) (from (France) Brest Bretagne Handball)?

Leaving

- (Czech Republic) Sabrina Novotná (GK) (to (Romania) CSM București)?
- (France) Chloé Valentini (LW) (to (France) Brest Bretagne Handball)

=== Technical staff ===
Staff for the 2026–27 season

- (France) Head coach: Emmanuel Mayonnade
- (Russia) Assistant coach: Yekaterina Andryushina
- (France) Physical coach: Samuel Breton
- (France) Goalkeeping coach: Vincent Gérard
- (France) Physiotherapist: Alexandre Pawlowski
- (France) Physiotherapist: Pierre Gillet
- (France) Physiotherapist: Charles Balanger
- (France) Doctor: Thierry Weizman
- (France) Video analyst: Edgar Le Denn

== Academy ==
=== Training Center ===
As of the 2026–27 season

Goalkeepers

- 12 (France) Maëlle Landriau
- 41 (Brazil) Manuella Antunes Navarro

Left Wingers

- 00 (Bulgaria) Marie Delchev
- 88 (France) Marie-Eve Holler

Right Wingers

- 4 (France) Blandine Gros
- 78 (France) Clémence Castets

Line Players

- 22 (Italy) Alice Giliberto
- 25 (France) Eléa Ferdilus (c)
- 30 (Luxembourg) Valérie De Jesus Gomes Ferreira

Left Backs

- 8 (France) Héléa Thevenot
- 32 (France) Maily Etilopy
- 50 (France) Romane Guillot

Centre Backs

- 9 (Tunisia) Sara Mansouri
- 17 (France) Gabrielle Buisson
- 57 (France) Anaïs Ababsa

Right Backs

- 15 (France) Tylia Paillasson

=== Men's team ===
As of the 2026–27 season

Goalkeepers

- 16 (France) Ilan Della Vedova
- 90 (France) Maël Bouvret
- 97 (Republic of the Congo) Jérémie Nomède Tisseur

Left Wingers

- 24 (France) Vincent Massaro
- 98 (Italy) Luka Giron

Right Wingers

- 6 (France) Tom Hurstel
- 11 (France) Nathan Hurstel
- 44 (France) Xavier Blond

Line Players

- 4 (France) Noa Catoni
- 00 (France) Lucas Carton
- 10 (France) Titouan Bourgeais
- 13 (France) Emile Clément (c)

Left Backs

- 12 (France) Lory Altis
- 23 (Morocco) Hakim El Maggoussi
- 82 (France) Maël Zanello

Centre Backs

- 26 (France) Martin Richard
- 00 (France) Léo Bottoli
- 57 (France) Simon Vauchelet
- 77 (France) Alexandre Belin

Right Backs

- 7 (France) Lucas Friang
- 8 (France) Loïc Binet

== Statistics ==
=== Top scorers in the EHF Champions League ===
(All-Time) – Last updated on 20 December 2025

Rank	Name	Seasons played	Goals
1	(France) Sarah Bouktit	6	379
2	(France) Grâce Zaadi	8	300
3	(France) Chloé Valentini	4	262
4	(Slovenia) Ana Gros	4	231
5	(Denmark) Louise Burgaard	5	211
6	(France) Meline Nocandy	7	198
7	(Netherlands) Jurswailly Luciano	10	181
8	(France) Laura Schneider	6	174
9	(Denmark) Kristina Jørgensen	3	170
10	(Germany) Xenia Smits	6	167

=== Individual awards in the EHF Champions League ===
Season	Player	Award
2018–19	(France) Manon Houette	All–Star Team (Best Left Wing)
2018–19	(France) Emmanuel Mayonnade	All–Star Team (Best Coach)
2019–20	(France) Emmanuel Mayonnade	All–Star Team (Best Coach)
2023–24	(France) Chloé Valentini	All–Star Team (Best Left Wing)
2023–24	(France) Sarah Bouktit	All–Star Team (Best Line Player)
2024–25	(France) Chloé Valentini	All–Star Team (Best Left Wing)
2025–26	(France) Sarah Bouktit	Most Valuable Player F4
2025–26	(France) Sarah Bouktit	Most Valuable Player Season
2025–26	(France) Sarah Bouktit	All–Star Team (Best Line player)
2025–26	(Sweden) Johanna Bundsen	All–Star Team (Best Goalkeeper)
2025–26	(France) Chloé Valentini	All–Star Team (Best Left Wing)
2025–26	(France) Lucie Granier	All–Star Team (Best Right Wing)
2025–26	(France) Lylou Borg	Young Player of the Season

== Notable former players ==
=== Retired numbers ===
Metz Handball
No.	Player	Position	Tenure	Seasons
13	(France) Isabelle Wendling	Line Player	1989–2010	21

- (France) Camille Ayglon
- (France) Paule Baudouin
- (France) Isabelle Cendier Ajaguin
- (France) Chloé Bulleux
- (France) Cléopatre Darleux
- (France) Béatrice Edwige
- (France) Laura Schneider
- (France) Laura Glauser
- (France) Astride N'Gouan
- (France) Nathalie Selambarom
- (France) Gervaise Pierson
- (France) Orlane Kanor
- (France) Tamara Horacek
- (France) Méline Nocandy
- (France) Leila Lejeune
- (France) Manon Houette
- (Hungary) / (France) Melinda Jacques-Szabó
- (France) Nina Kamto Njitam
- (France) Corinne Krumbholz
- (France) Laurisa Landre
- (France) Amandine Leynaud
- (France) Marion Limal
- (France) Stéphanie Ludwig
- (France) Nodjialem Myaro
- (France) Claudine Mendy
- (France) Gnonsiane Niombla
- (France) Allison Pineau
- (France) Katty Piejos
- (France) Estelle Vogein
- (France) Linda Pradel
- (France) Sophie Remiatte
- (France) Maakan Tounkara
- (France) Delphine Guehl
- (France) Isabelle Wendling
- (France) Grâce Zaadi
- (France) Hatadou Sako
- (France) Camille Depuiset
- (France) Emma Jacques
- (France) Djazz Chambertin
- (France) Anne-Emmanuelle Augustine
- (France) Sarah Bouktit
- (Angola) Justina Praça
- (Angola) Stelvia Pascoal
- (Brazil) Bruna de Paula
- (Brazil) Adriana Cardoso
- (Croatia) Klaudija Bubalo
- (Croatia) Kristina Franić (Elez)
- (Croatia) Ivana Kapitanović
- (Croatia) Ćamila Mičijević
- (Croatia) Ivana Lovric
- (Croatia) Vesna Horaček
- (Czech Republic) Lenka Černá
- (Czech Republic) Pavla Poznarová
- (Czech Republic) Lenka Kysučanová
- (Denmark) Louise Burgaard
- (Denmark) Kristina Jørgensen
- (Denmark) Anne Mette Hansen
- (Spain) Lara González
- (Germany) Xenia Smits
- (Germany) Alina Grijseels
- (Hungary) Andrea Farkas
- (Hungary) Viktória Csáki
- (Hungary) Zsófi Szemerey
- (Montenegro) Marina Vukčević (Rajčić)
- (Netherlands) Debbie Bont
- (Netherlands) Yvette Broch
- (Netherlands) Jurswailly Luciano
- (Russia) Ekaterina Andryushina
- (Russia) Valeriia Maslova
- (Russia) / (France) Irina Popova
- (Serbia) Zita Galic
- (Serbia) Kristina Liščević
- (Serbia) Tatjana Medved
- (Serbia) Svetlana Ognjenović
- (Serbia) Slađana Pop-Lazić
- (Slovenia) Ana Gros
- (Slovenia) Tjasa Stanko
- (Ukraine) Olga Peredery
- (Romania) Carmen Nițescu
- (Sweden) Johanna Bundsen
- (Sweden) Tyra Axnér

== Head coach history ==
(France)	Claude Guillois	1980–1985
(France)	Olivier Krumbholz	1985–1995
(France)	Joël Monasso	1995–1996
(France)	Patrick Passemard	2003
(France)	Bertrand François	1996–2003; 2004–2006; 2009–2010
(Serbia)	Dragan Majstrorovic	2010
(France)	Sébastien Gardillou	2010–2012
(Serbia)	Sandor Rac	2006–2009; 2012–2014
(France)	Jérémy Roussel	2014–2015
(France)	Emmanuel Mayonnade	2015–

== Stadium ==
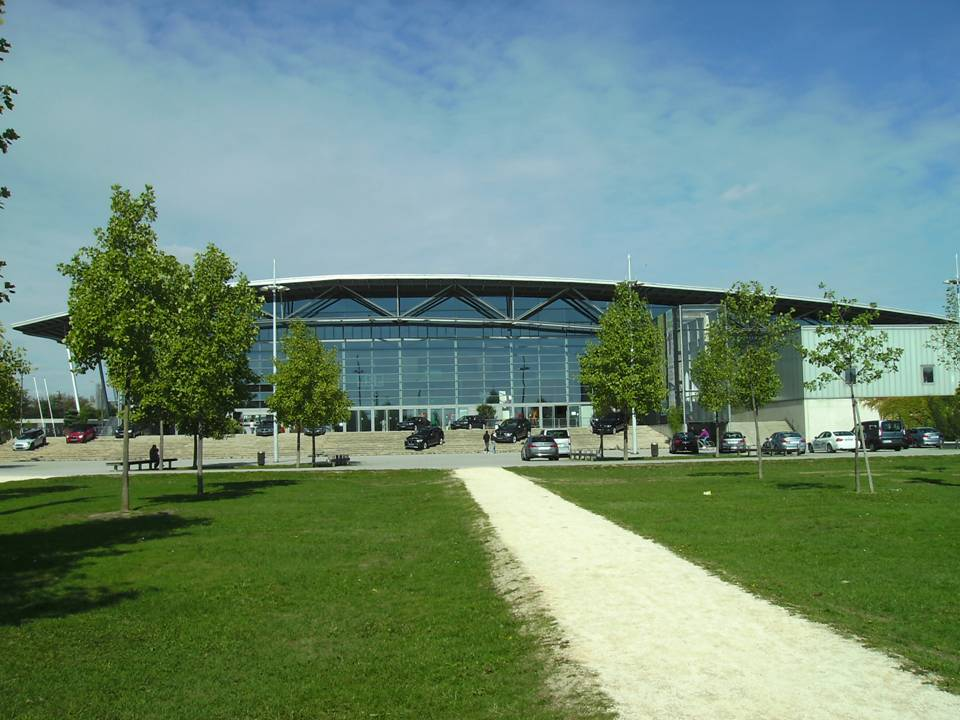
Metz Arena in 2010

- Name: Les Arènes
- City: Metz
- Capacity: 4,500 / 5,000
- Address: 5 avenue Louis-le-Débonnaire 57000
- Played in the arena since: 2001-

== Kit manufacturers ==
- (Germany) Kempa
