= Lyndie Tchaptchet =

Handball player (born 2005)

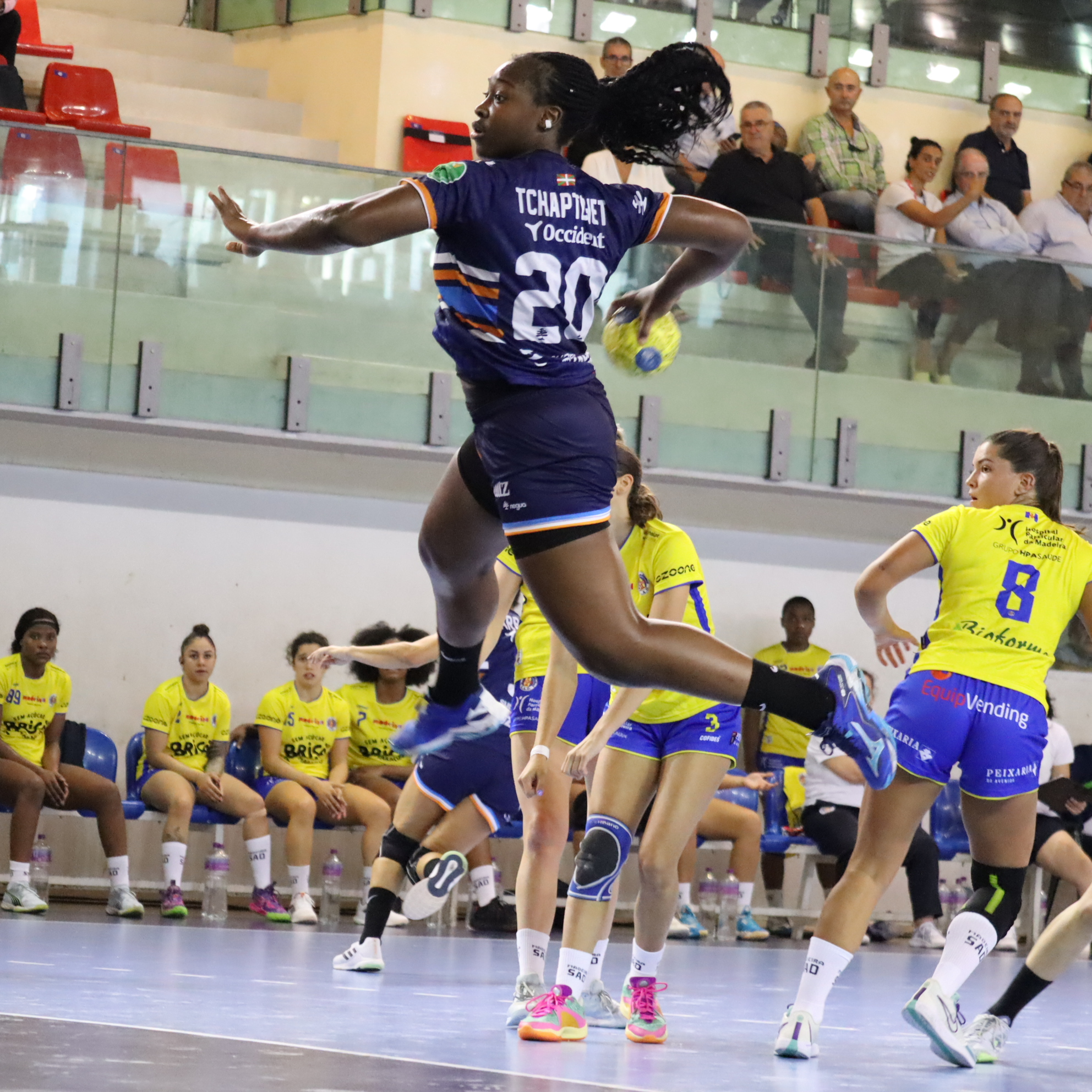

Personal information
- Full name: Lyndie Tchaptchet Defo
- Nationality: Spain
- Born: January 13, 2005 (age 21) Yaoundé, Cameroon
- Height: 1.85 m (6 ft 1 in)

Sport
- Sport: Handball
- Position: Pivot
- Current club: Metz Handball

Youth career
- Years: Team
- –: Beti-Onak

Senior clubs
- Years: Team
- 2022–2024: Replasa Beti-Onak
- 2024–2026: Super Amara Bera Bera
- 2026–: Metz Handball
National team
Years	Team	Apps	(Gls)
2024–	Spain	26	(46)
- Updated on 6 July 2025

Lyndie Tchaptchet Defo (born 13 January 2005) is a Spanish handball player who plays as a pivot for Super Amara Bera Bera and the Spain national team. Born in Cameroon and raised in Navarre (Spain), she won the Spanish league-and-cup double with Bera Bera in 2024–25 and has been capped by Spain since 2024. In January 2026 Bera Bera announced she would leave in the summer to join French powerhouse Metz Handball.

== Club career ==
Tchaptchet came through the Beti-Onak system in Navarre and debuted in Spain's top flight with Replasa Beti-Onak, standing out in their first seasons after promotion. Her performances earned a transfer to Super Amara Bera Bera ahead of 2024–25.

In her first season at Bera Bera (2024–25) she helped the club win the Liga Guerreras Iberdrola title, the Copa de la Reina and the Iberian Supercup.

On 2 January 2026 Bera Bera announced that Tchaptchet would not renew for 2026–27 after accepting an offer from an EHF Champions League regular, Metz Handball.

=== Clubs ===
- 2022-2024: (Spain) Replasa Beti-Onak
- 2024-2026: (Spain) Super Amara Bera Bera
- 2026-: Metz Handball (France)

== International career ==
Tchaptchet made her senior debut for Spain in 2024 and was included in the Spain squad lists around the 2024 European Women's Handball Championship cycle. She later appeared at the 2025 IHF World Women's Handball Championship, where the IHF lists her as a pivot for Spain.

== Achievements ==
- Spanish league:
  - Winner: 2023/2024, 2024/2025
- Copa de la Reina:
  - Winner: 2023/2024, 2024/2025
- Supercopa ibérica
  - Winner: 2023/2024, 2024/2025

== Private life ==
She is the younger sister of Spain international line player Lysa Tchaptchet.
