= Jurswailly Luciano =

Dutch handball player (born 1991)

Ailly Luciano
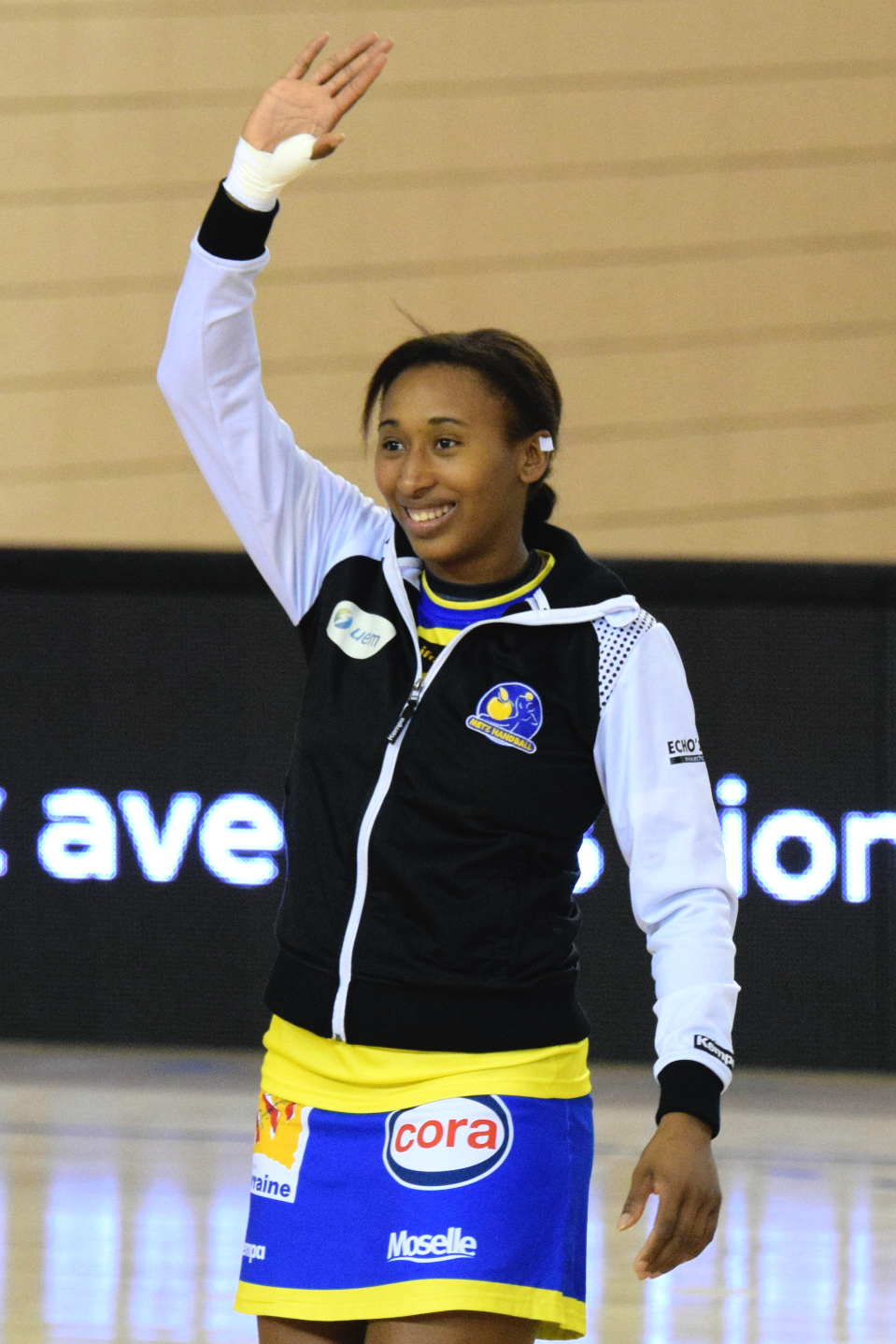

Personal information
- Nationality: Dutch
- Born: 25 March 1991 (age 35) Willemstad, Curaçao
- Height: 1.71 m (5 ft 7 in)

Sport
- Sport: Handball
- Position: Right wing
- Current club: Garage Kil/Volendam
- Number: 30

Senior clubs
- Years: Team
- –2011: Quintus
- 2011–2020: Metz Handball
- 2020–2021: Metz Handball
- 2024–: Garage Kil/Volendam
National team
Years	Team	Apps	(Gls)
2012–	Netherlands	54	(115)

Jurswailly "Ailly" Luciano (born 25 March 1991) is a Dutch handball player, who plays for Garage Kil/Volendam and the Netherlands national team.

== Career ==
Luciano started her career at Voort/Quintus in the Netherlands. In 2011 she joined French side Metz Handball. Here she won the 2013 French championship and Cup. She also reached the final of the EHF Cup, where Metz lost to Danish team Team Tvis Holstebro. Since then she has won the 2015, 2017 and 2019 French cup and the 2016, 2017, 2018 and 2019 French Championship.

She retired in 2021. In May 2024 she made a comeback to the Dutch club Garage Kil/Volendam.

=== National team ===
She debuted for the Dutch national team on 15 May 2012 against Great Britain.

She represented the Netherlands at the 2013 World Championship in Serbia.

== Titles ==
- LFH Division 1 Féminine
  - Winner: 2013, 2016, 2017, 2018, 2019
- Coupe de France
  - Winner: 2013, 2015, 2017, 2019
- EHF Cup:
  - Finalist: 2013

== Individual awards ==
- All-Star Right Wing of the Championnat de France: 2017
