= Chloé Valentini =

French handball player (born 1995)

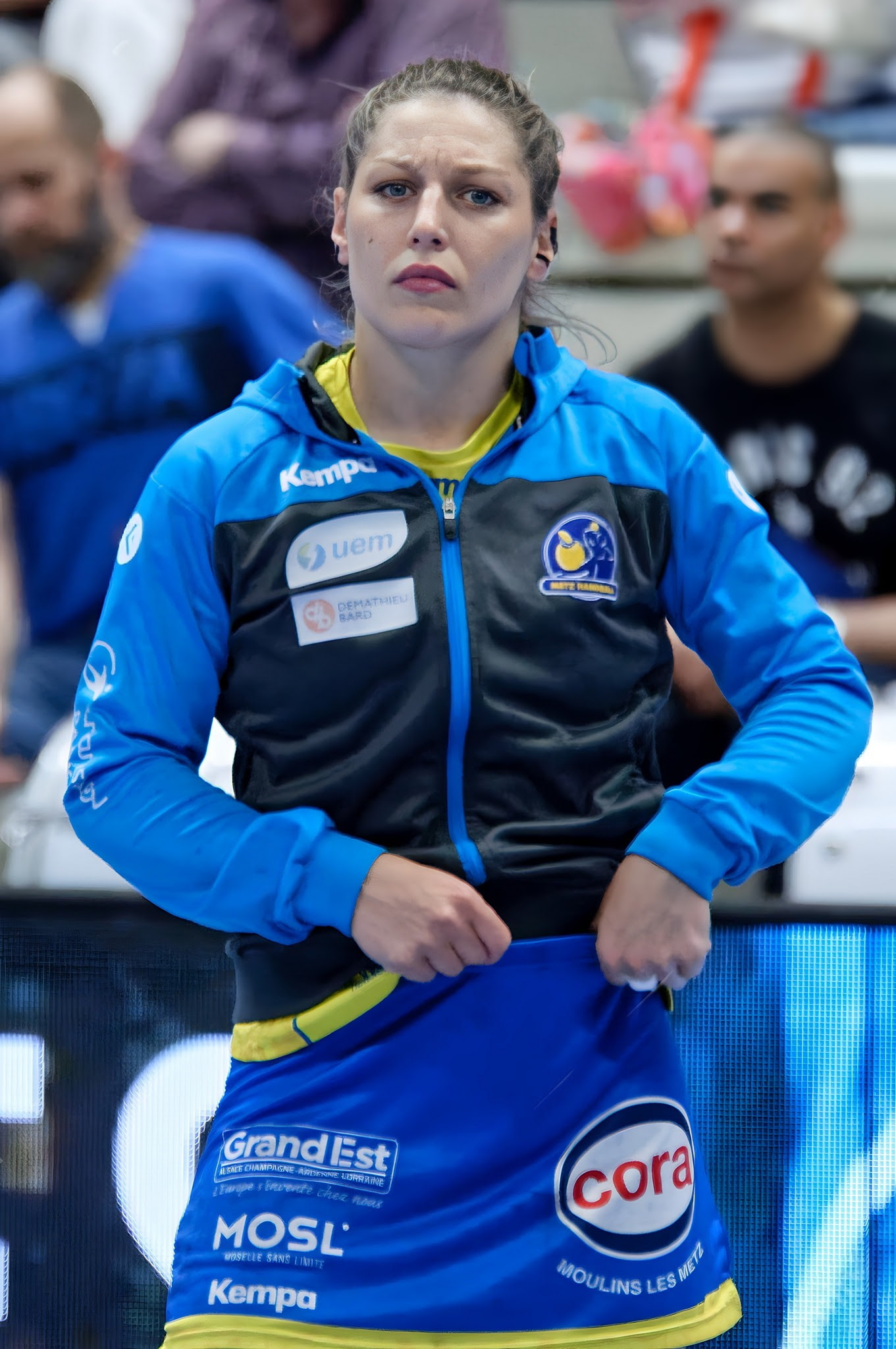
- Valentini in 2022

Personal information
- Full name: Chloé Bouquet Valentini
- Nationality: French
- Born: 19 April 1995 (age 31) Morteau, France
- Height: 1.65 m (5 ft 5 in)

Sport
- Sport: Handball
- Position: Left wing
- Current club: Metz Handball
- Number: 6

Youth career
- Years: Team
- 2011-: CA Morteau HB
- 2011-2013: ES Besançon

Senior clubs
- Years: Team
- 2013–2021: ES Besançon
- 2021–: Metz Handball
National team
Years	Team	Apps	(Gls)
2019–	France	110	(328)
Medal record
Olympic Games
Gold medal – first place	2020 Tokyo	Team
Silver medal – second place	2024 Paris	Team
World Championship
Gold medal – first place	2023 Denmark/Norway/Sweden
Silver medal – second place	2021 Spain
European Championship
Silver medal – second place	2020 Denmark

Chloé Bouquet Valentini (née Chloé Bouquet, 19 April 1995) is a French female handball player for Metz Handball and the French national team.

== Career ==
Valentini started playing handball at her hometown club, CA Morteau HB. In 2011, she transferred to ES Besançon. She debuted for the senior team in 2013 in the second best French league. In her first season, the club was promoted to Division 1.

In 2017, she signed her first professional contract.

In 2021, she switched to league rivals Metz Handball. Here, she won both the French Championship and French Cup in 2022, 2023, and 2024.

=== National team ===
In 2017 she was part of the France women's national beach handball team and participated in the European Women's Beach Handball Championship.

She debuted for the French national on September 25, 2019 against Turkey.

The same year, she represented France at the 2019 World Women's Handball Championship, where France came 13th.

At the 2021 Olympics she was part of the French team that won Gold medals, the first for France. Valentini scored 16 goals during the tournament. Later the same year she won silver medals at the 2021 World Championship, losing to Norway in the final.

At the 2023 World Championship she won gold medals. At this occasion she was chosen for the tournament all-star team.

At the 2024 Olympic Games she won silver medals, once again losing to Norway in the final.

She missed the 2025 World Cup due to recently giving birth.

With Metz Handball she won EHF Women Chamniops Legue in season 2025/2026.

== Individual awards ==
- All-Star left wing of the World Championship: 2023
- EHF Excellence Awards: Left Wing of the Season 2023/24, 2024/25
