= Sarah Bouktit =

French handball player (born 2002)

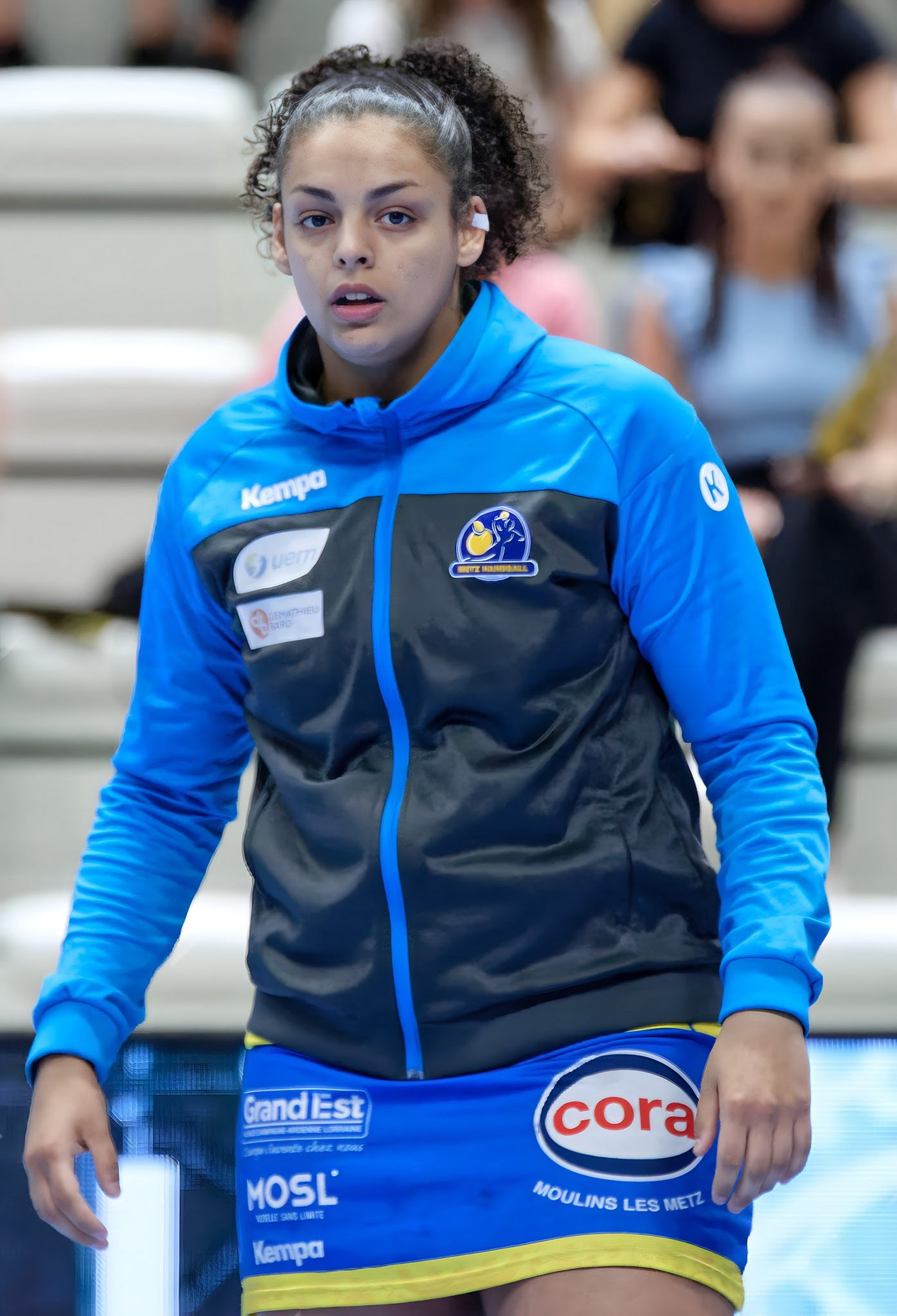
- Bouktit in 2022

Personal information
- Nationality: French
- Born: 27 August 2002 (age 24) Mont-Saint-Martin, France
- Height: 1.82 m (6 ft 0 in)

Sport
- Sport: Handball
- Position: Pivot
- Current club: Győri ETO KC
- Number: 77

Senior clubs
- Years: Team
- 2019–2020: Metz Handball
- 2020–2021: Fleury Loiret HB
- 2021–2026: Metz Handball
- 2026–: Győri ETO KC
National team
Years	Team	Apps	(Gls)
2022–	France	63	(164)
Medal record
Olympic Games
Silver medal – second place	2024 Paris	Team
World Championship
Gold medal – first place	2023 Denmark/Norway/Sweden
Bronze medal – third place	2025 Germany/Netherlands
Youth European Championship
Bronze medal – third place	2019 Slovenia
European Youth Summer Olympic Festival
Gold medal – first place	2019 Baku

Sarah Bouktit (born 27 August 2002) is a French female handball player for Győri ETO KC and the French national team.

She represented France in the 2019 European Women's U-17 Handball Championship, where she received silver. She was awarded to the All-Star Team, as best line player of the tournament.

In March 2022, she was called up to the France team for the qualifying matches for 2022 European Women's Handball Championship. Her debut at the senior national team came at the age of 19, on 3 March 2022 during the victory against Croatia.

For the 2025 World Championship she won bronze medals losing to Germany in the semifinal and beating Netherlands after extra time in the bronze final. She was selected for the All Star Team of the tournament and was the French top scorer with 44 goals.

During the EHF Champions League 2025-26, she came 2nd in the topscorer title (with 125 goals). During the final 4 she scored a total of 20 goals, with 12 of them being in the final against Győri ETO KC.

== Personal life ==
Born in France, Bouktit is of Algerian descent.

== Achievements ==
- Olympic Games:
  - Silver: 2024
- World Championship:
  - Winner: 2023
  - Bronze: 2025
- Youth European Championship:
  - Bronze Medalist: 2019
- EHF Champions League:
  - Winner: 2026
  - Bronze: 2022

== Individual awards ==
- MVP of the EHF Champions League Final Four: 2026
- All Star Line Player of the 2025 World Women's Handball Championship
- EHF Excellence Awards: Pivot of the Season 2023/24
- All-Star Team Line player of the Youth European Championship: 2019
