= Handball at the 2024 Summer Olympics – African women's qualification tournament =

African Women's Qualification for Olympic Games 2024
Tournament details
- Host country: Angola
- Venue(s): 1 (in 1 host city)
- Dates: 11–14 October 2023
- Teams: 4 (from 1 confederation)

Final positions
- Champions: Angola
- Runner-up: Cameroon
- Third place: Senegal
- Fourth place: Congo

Tournament statistics
- Matches played: 6
- Goals scored: 259 (43.17 per match)

The African Women's Qualification for Olympic Games 2024 was held in Luanda, Angola from 11 to 14 October 2023.

Angola, as the winner, qualified for the 2024 Summer Olympics.

== Standings ==
Pos	Team	Pld	W	D	L	GF	GA	GD	Pts	Qualification
1	Angola (H)	3	3	0	0	79	57	+22	6	2024 Summer Olympics
2	Cameroon	3	1	1	1	59	63	−4	3	Qualification tournaments
3	Senegal	3	1	0	2	63	61	+2	2	
4	Congo	3	0	1	2	58	78	−20	1	

Rules for classification: 1) points; 2) head-to-head points; 3) head-to-head goal difference; 4) head-to-head number of goals scored; 5) goal difference.
(H) Hosts

== Matches ==
All times are local (UTC+1).

11 October 2023; 16:00	Cameroon	21–21	Congo	Pavilhão Multiusos, Luanda
11 October 2023; 16:00		(9–12)		Pavilhão Multiusos, Luanda
11 October 2023; 16:00		Report		Pavilhão Multiusos, Luanda

11 October 2023; 18:00	Angola	22–21	Senegal	Pavilhão Multiusos, Luanda
11 October 2023; 18:00		(11–11)		Pavilhão Multiusos, Luanda
11 October 2023; 18:00		Report		Pavilhão Multiusos, Luanda

12 October 2023; 16:00	Cameroon	17–15	Senegal	Pavilhão Multiusos, Luanda
12 October 2023; 16:00		(7–6)		Pavilhão Multiusos, Luanda
12 October 2023; 16:00		Report		Pavilhão Multiusos, Luanda

12 October 2023; 18:00	Congo	15–30	Angola	Pavilhão Multiusos, Luanda
12 October 2023; 18:00		(9–17)		Pavilhão Multiusos, Luanda
12 October 2023; 18:00		Report		Pavilhão Multiusos, Luanda

14 October 2023; 16:00	Senegal	27–22	Congo	Pavilhão Multiusos, Luanda
14 October 2023; 16:00		(16–13)		Pavilhão Multiusos, Luanda
14 October 2023; 16:00		Report		Pavilhão Multiusos, Luanda

14 October 2023; 18:00	Angola	27–21	Cameroon	Pavilhão Multiusos, Luanda
14 October 2023; 18:00		(16–9)		Pavilhão Multiusos, Luanda
14 October 2023; 18:00		Report		Pavilhão Multiusos, Luanda
