= Léna Grandveau =

French handball player (born 2003)

Personal information
- Nationality: French
- Born: 21 January 2003 (age 23) Beaune, France
- Height: 1.71 m (5 ft 7 in)

Sport
- Sport: Handball
- Position: Centre back
- Current club: Metz Handball
- Number: 29

Youth career
- Years: Team
- 2008-2017: Beaune Handball
- 2017-2020: Chevigny-St-Sauveur

Senior clubs
- Years: Team
- 2020–2022: Bourg-de-Péage Drôme
- 2022–2024: Neptunes de Nantes
- 2024–: Metz Handball
National team
Years	Team	Apps	(Gls)
2022-	France	51	(79)
Medal record
Olympic Games
Silver medal – second place	2024 Paris	Team
World Championship
Gold medal – first place	2023 Denmark/Norway/Sweden
Bronze medal – third place	2025 Germany/Netherlands
Youth European Championship
Bronze medal – third place	2019 Slovenia
European Youth Summer Olympic Festival
Gold medal – first place	2019 Baku
- Updated on 27 October 2025

Léna Grandveau (born 21 January 2003) is a French female handball player for Metz Handball and the French national team. She is a world champion from 2023.

== Club career ==
Grandveau started her career at Bourg-de-Péage Drôme, before joining Neptunes de Nantes in 2022. Due to Nantes' financial trouble, she joined Metz Handball in 2024. Here she won the 2025 French Championship and Coupe de France.

== International career ==
Grandveau represented France in the 2019 European Women's U-17 Handball Championship, where she received bronze. She was awarded to the All-Star Team, as best Centre back of the tournament.

She debuted for the French senior national team on 30 October 2022 in a 31:28 win against Poland. With France she won the 2023 World Championship. At the 2024 Olympics at home soil she won silver medals, losing to Norway in the final.

For the 2025 World Championship she won bronze medals losing to Germany in the semifinal and beating Netherlands in extra time in the third place playoff.

== Achievements ==
- World Championship:
  - 2023: Gold
  - 2025: Bronze
- Youth European Championship:
  - Bronze Medalist: 2019

== Individual awards ==
- All-Star Team Best Centre back of the Youth European Championship: 2019
- IHF Young Female Player of the Year 2023
