= Lylou Borg =

French handball player (born 2005)

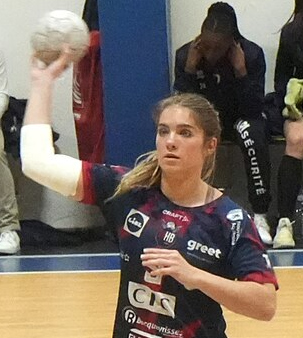

Personal information
- Full name: Lylou Borg
- Nationality: French
- Born: 31 March 2005 (age 21) Pessac, France
- Height: 1.75 m (5 ft 9 in)

Sport
- Sport: Handball
- Position: Centre back
- Current club: Metz Handball
- Number: 76

Senior clubs
- Years: Team
- 2023–2025: Mérignac Handball
- 2025–: Metz Handball
National team
Years	Team	Apps	(Gls)
2025–	France	11	(21)

Lylou Borg (born 31 March 2005) is a French professional handballer for Metz Handball in the LFH Division 1 Féminine and the French national team.

She made her international debut on French national team on 8 March 2025 against Germany. Her twin sister, Enola Borg is also a professional handball player for Metz rivals Brest Bretagne Handball.

== Achievements ==
- Women's EHF Champions League:
  - Winner: 2026
- French Women's First League Championship:
  - Silver Medalist: 2026
- French Women's Cup Championship:
  - Winner: 2026
