= Laura Schneider =

French handball player (born 1994)

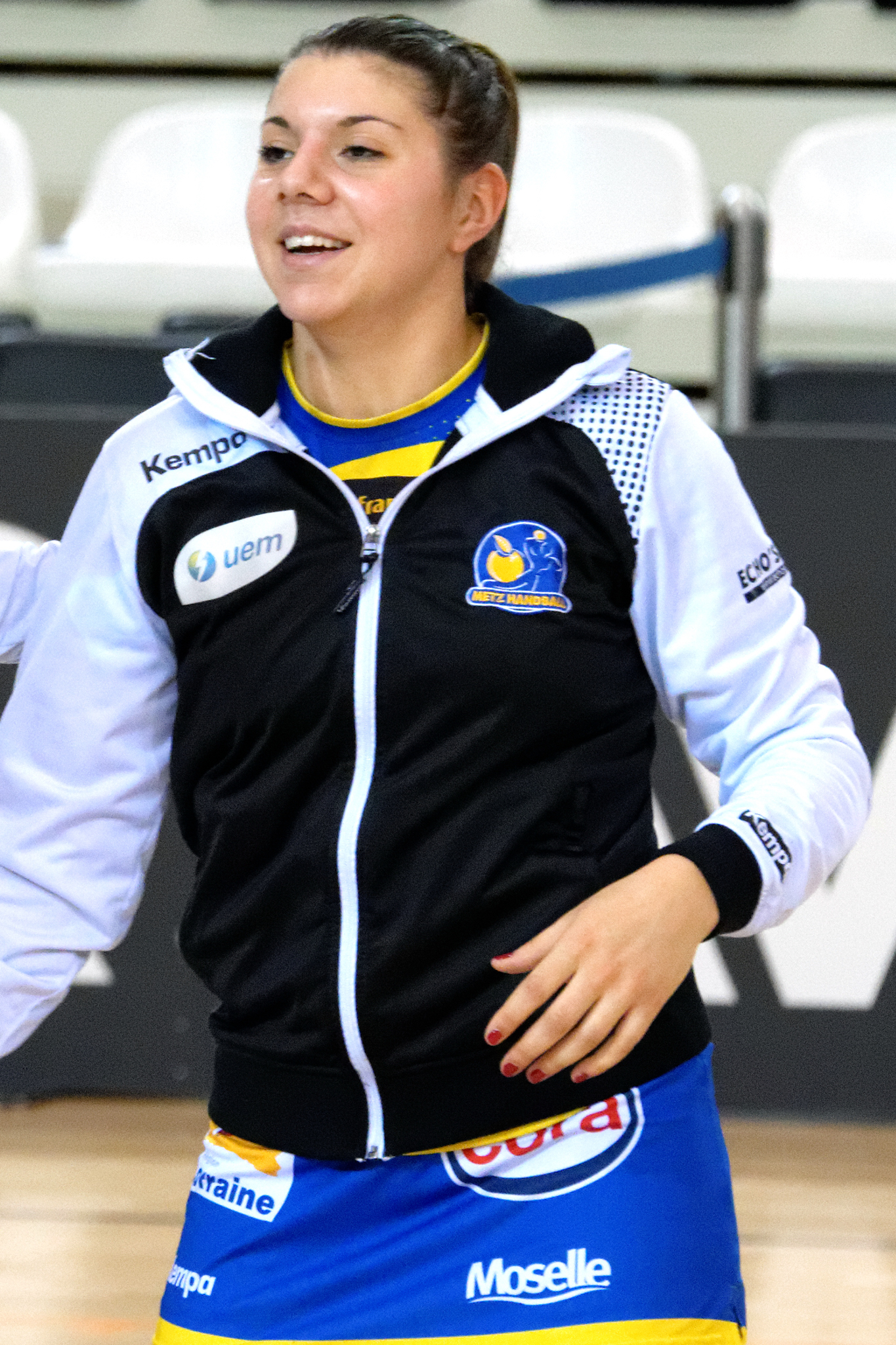
- Flippes in 2016

Personal information
- Full name: Laura Esther Ghislaine Schneider
- Born: 13 December 1994 (age 31) Strasbourg, France
- Height: 1.71 m (5 ft 7 in)

Sport
- Sport: Handball
- Position: Right back
- Current club: Metz Handball
- Number: 20

Youth career
- Years: Team
- –: HBC Lingolsheim

Senior clubs
- Years: Team
- 2005–2013: Achenheim Truchtersheim HB
- 2013–2020: Metz Handball
- 2020–2023: Paris 92
- 2023–2024: CSM București
- 2024–: Metz Handball
National team
Years	Team	Apps	(Gls)
2016–	France	141	(278)
Medal record
Olympic Games
Gold medal – first place	2020 Tokyo	Team
Silver medal – second place	2024 Paris	Team
World Championship
Gold medal – first place	2017 Germany
Gold medal – first place	2023 Denmark/Norway/Sweden
Silver medal – second place	2021 Spain
European Championship
Gold medal – first place	2018 France
Silver medal – second place	2020 Denmark
Bronze medal – third place	2016 Sweden
- Updated on 12 November 2024

Laura Esther Ghislaine Schneider (née Flippes; born 13 December 1994) is a French handballer for Metz Handball and the French national team. She is an Olympic champion in 2021, a World champion in 2017 and 2023, and European champion in 2018.

== Career ==
Flippes started playing handball at HBC Lingolsheim. In 2005, she joined Achenheim Truchtersheim HB. Here she won the 2013 French third league. The following summer, she joined top league side Metz Handball. Here, she won the 2014, 2016, 2017, 2018, and 2019 French Championship, the 2015, 2017, and 2019 French Cup, and the 2014 French League Cup.

In 2020, she joined league rivals Paris 92. In 2023 she joined Romanian CSM București. Here, she won the 2024 Romanian league and cup double, before returning to Metz Handball a year later.

=== National team ===
Flippes played for various youth national teams.

She debuted for the senior national team in June 2016, in preparation for the 2016 Olympics. At the 2016 European Championship, she won bronze medals with the French team. She won the 2017 World Championship and a year later, she won gold medals again at the 2018 European Championship.

At the 2020 European Championship, she won silver medals. The year after, she won Olympic gold at the 2021 Olympics in Tokyo. During the tournament, she scored 27 goals and was selected for the tournament all-star team. Later the same year, she won silver medals at the 2021 World Championship, losing the final to Norway.

In 2023, she won the World Championship. At the 2024 Olympics she won silver medals with the French team.

She missed the 2025 World Championship due to pregnancy.

== Achievements ==
- Championnat de France:
  - Winner: 2014, 2016, 2017, 2018, 2019, 2025
- Coupe de France:
  - Winner: 2015, 2017, 2025, 2026
- Coupe de la Ligue:
  - Winner: 2014

Individual Awards

- All-Star Team as best Right Wing at the Olympic Games: 2020

With Metz Handball she won EHF Women Chamniops Legue in season 2025/2026.

== Personal life ==
Flippes married athlete Nicolas Schneider on 20 June 2025.
