= Grâce Zaadi =

French handball player (born 1993)

Grace Zaadi
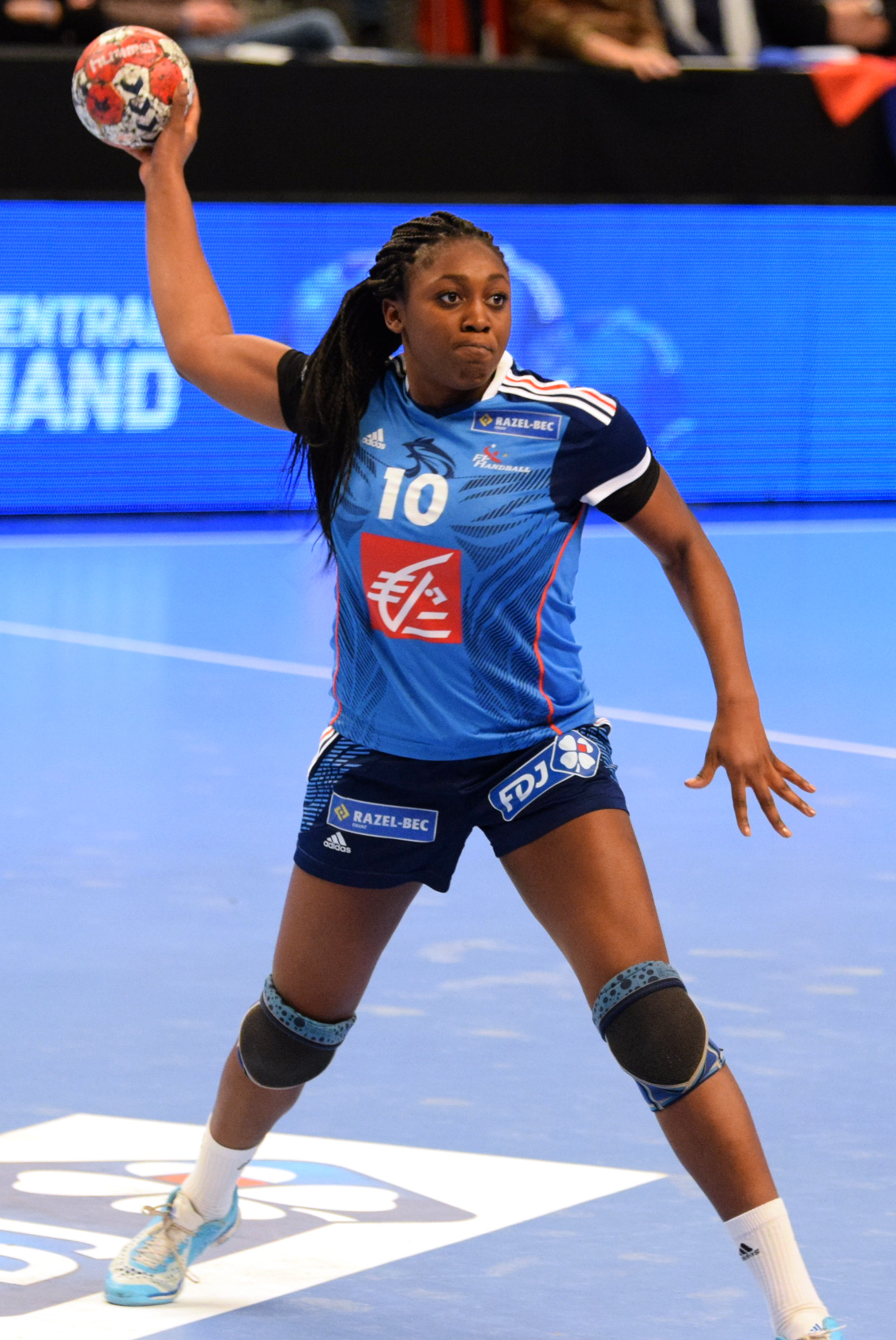
- Zaadi in 2015

Personal information
- Full name: Grâce Zaadi Deuna
- Nationality: French
- Born: 7 July 1993 (age 33) Courcouronnes, France
- Height: 1.71 m (5 ft 7 in)

Sport
- Sport: Handball
- Position: Centre back
- Current club: Ramnicu Valcea
- Number: 7

Youth career
- Years: Team
- 2003-2006: Villepinte
- 2006-2010: Issy-les-Moulineaux

Senior clubs
- Years: Team
- 2013–2020: Metz HB
- 2020–2022: Rostov-Don
- 2022: Metz HB
- 2022–2024: CSM București
- 2024–2026: RK Krim
- 2026: Metz Handball
National team
Years	Team	Apps	(Gls)
2013–	France	207	(411)
Medal record
Olympic Games
Gold medal – first place	2020 Tokyo	Team
Silver medal – second place	2016 Rio de Janeiro	Team
Silver medal – second place	2024 Paris	Team
World Championship
Gold medal – first place	2017 Germany
Gold medal – first place	2023 Denmark/Norway/Sweden
Silver medal – second place	2021 Spain
European Championship
Gold medal – first place	2018 France
Silver medal – second place	2020 Denmark
Bronze medal – third place	2016 Sweden

Grâce Zaadi Deuna (born 7 July 1993) is a French handball player for Ramnicu Valcea and the French national team, where she is the team captain.

Her achievements with the national team include winning one Olympic gold medal and two silver medals, two world championship titles, and one European title.

== Career ==
=== Club career ===
Zaadi started playing handball in 2003 at Villepinte. Three years later she joined Issy-les-Moulineaux at the age of 16. In 2010 she joined Metz Handball. Here she won the French Championship in 2013, 2014, 2016, 2017, 2018 and 2019, the League Cup in 2014 and the French Cup in 2013, 2015, 2017 and 2019. In 2013 she reached the final of the EHF European League.

In 2020 she joined the Russian club Rostov-Don. Following the Russian Invasion of Ukraine in March 2022 she signed a contract to return to Metz Handball. She once again one the French championship and the French cup in 2022. The following summer she signed for Rumanian team CSM București. Here she won the Romanian league and Romanien cup in 2023 and 2024.

In 2024 she joined Slovenian top club RK Krim.

=== National team ===
In 2012 Zaadi won a silver medal at the U-20 Women's world championship. She played her first match for the senior national team on October 24th 2013 against Slovakia in a qualification match for the 2014 European Women's Handball Championship. She represented France at the 2013 and 2015 World Women's Handball Championship. At the 2016 Olympics she won gold medals with the French team. At the 2016 European Women's Handball Championship she won bronze medals. She won gold medals at the 2017 World Championship in Germany, where she was part of the tournament all star team. At the 2018 European Championship at home she won gold medals. At the 2020 Olympics she once again won golds medals with the French team, beating Russia in the final 30:25. Zaadi was selected for the tournament all star team, scoring 33 goals. At the 2023 World Championship she once again won gold medals with the French team. At the 2024 Olympics at home she won silver medals.

In September 2025 she was appointed captain of the French national team, replacing Estelle Nze Minko.

== Personal life ==
Born in France, Zaadi is of Cameroonian descent.

== Individual awards ==
- Championnat de France Best Playmaker: 2018
- All-Star Team as Best Playmaker at the Olympic Games: 2020
- All-Star team as Best Playmaker at the World Championship: 2017, 2021
