= Johanna Bundsen =

Swedish handball player (born 1991)

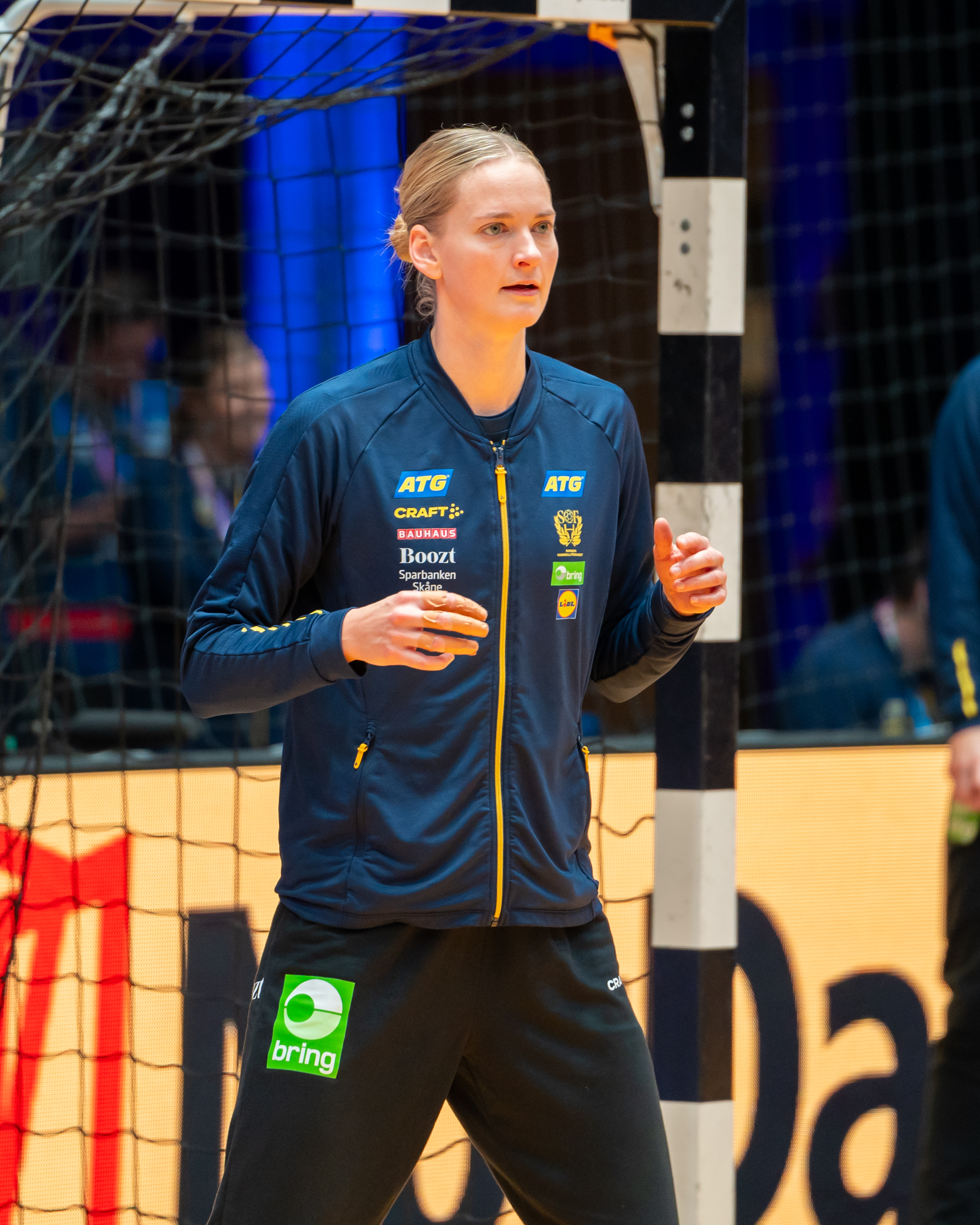
- Bundsen in 2025

Personal information
- Nationality: Swedish
- Born: 3 June 1991 (age 35) Uddevalla, Sweden
- Height: 1.83 m (6 ft 0 in)

Sport
- Sport: Handball
- Position: Goalkeeper
- Current club: Odense Håndbold
- Number: 1

Youth career
- Years: Team
- –: GF Kroppskultur

Senior clubs
- Years: Team
- 2007–2017: IK Sävehof
- 2017–2022: København Håndbold
- 2022–2024: IK Sävehof
- 2024–2025: HB Ludwigsburg
- 2025–2026: Metz Handball
- 2026–: Odense Håndbold
National team
Years	Team	Apps	(Gls)
2009–	Sweden	181	(18)
Medal record
European Championship
Bronze medal – third place	2014 Croatia/Hungary

Johanna Bundsen (born 3 June 1991) is a Swedish handball player for Odense Håndbold and the Swedish national team. In 2025 she was named Swedish Player of the Year.

== Career ==
She started at GF Kroppskultur, a club in her hometown Uddevalla, before switching to Swedish top flight club IK Sävehof. While there they won Swedish top league 8 consecutive seasons: 2008/2009 - 2015/2016. In 2017 she signed for Danish club København Håndbold, before returning to IK Sävehof in 2022, where she won her 9th league title as well as the cup in 2023.

== Achievements ==
- Svensk handbollselit:
  - Winner: 2009, 2010, 2011, 2012, 2013, 2014, 2015, 2016, 2023
- Swedish Handball Cup:
  - Winner: 2023, 2024
- Carpathian Trophy:
  - Winner: 2015
