= Lucie Granier =

French handball player (born 1999)

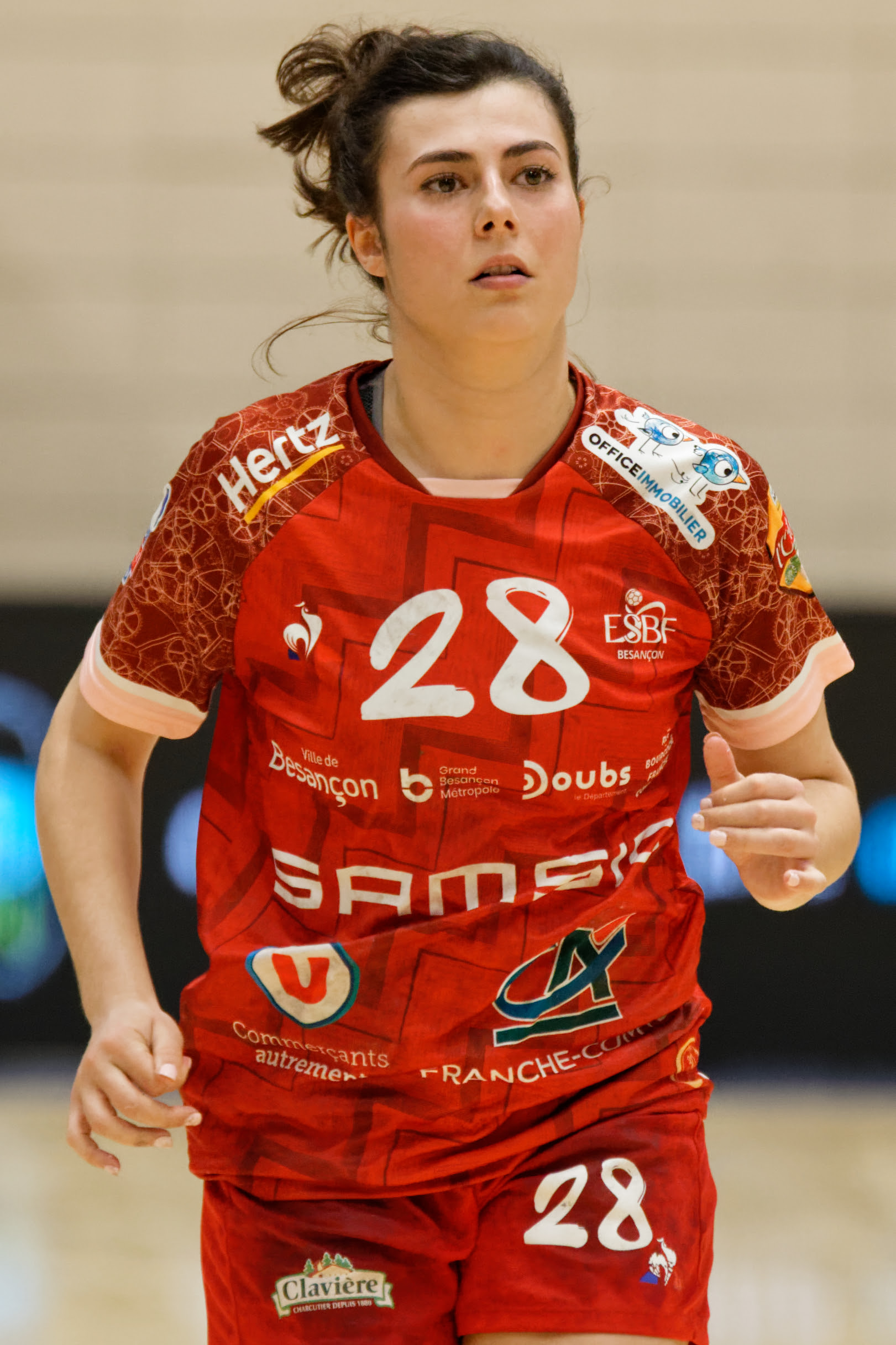
- Granier in 2022

Personal information
- Nationality: French
- Born: 11 June 1999 (age 27) Marseille, France
- Height: 1.67 m (5 ft 6 in)

Sport
- Sport: Handball
- Position: Right wing
- Current club: Metz Handball
- Number: 28

Youth career
- Years: Team
- 2010-2017: Handball Plan-de-Cuques

Senior clubs
- Years: Team
- 2017–2023: ESBF Besançon
- 2023–: Metz Handball
National team
Years	Team	Apps	(Gls)
2021–	France	77	(177)
Medal record
Olympic Games
Silver medal – second place	2024 Paris	Team
World Championship
Gold medal – first place	2023 Denmark/Norway/Sweden
Silver medal – second place	2021 Spain
Bronze medal – third place	2025 Germany/Netherlands
- Updated on 17 December 2025

Lucie Granier (born 11 June 1999) is a French handball player for Metz Handball and the French national team.

== Club career ==
Granier started her professional career in 2017, when she played for ESBF Besançon.

In 2023, she joined Metz Handball. Here she won the 2024 French championship and cup double.

== International career ==
Granier has previously played for various French youth teams.

On 6 October 2021, she made her debut for the French senior national team against Czechia. At the 2021 World Championship she won silver medals with the French team, when the lost to Norway in the final. At the 2023 World Championship she won gold medals.

At the 2024 Olympics at home soil she won silver medals, once again losing to Norway in the final.

For the 2025 World Championship she won bronze medals losing to Germany in the semifinal and beating Netherlands in extra time in the third place playoff.
