= Handball at the 2016 Summer Olympics =

Handball at the Games of the XXXI Olympiad

Tournament details
- Host country: Brazil
- Venue: Future Arena
- Dates: 6–21 August 2016
- Teams: 24 (from 4 confederations)

Final positions
- Champions: Denmark (men); Russia (women)
- Runners-up: France (men); France (women)
- Third place: Germany (men); Norway (women)
- Fourth place: Poland (men); Netherlands (women)

The handball tournaments at the 2016 Summer Olympics in Rio de Janeiro was held from 6 to 21 August at the Future Arena in the Barra Olympic Park. The tournaments were won by Denmark in the men's competition and Russia for the women's tournament. The French teams for both competitions finished with the silver medal, and the bronze went to Germany and Norway, respectively.

== Format ==
The handball event at the 2016 Summer Olympics was played between 6 and 21 August 2016 at the Future Arena in the Barra Olympic Park in Rio de Janeiro, Brazil. The Games consisted of two tournaments, one each for men and women's teams. The events featured twelve teams, who qualified for the tournament from a series of preceding tournaments, as well as the host country Brazil. The draw for the championships took place on 29 April 2016, and split the teams into round robin groups of six. Four teams from each group qualified for the knockout rounds, and the winner and runner-up receiving gold and silver medals respectively. A third-placed play-off was contested for the bronze medal.

Matches were played over 60 minutes, with two points being awarded to winners and a single point to draws in the group stage. Teams tied for points in the group stage featured a series of tiebreaker criteria including head-to-head points, goal difference and goals scored.

=== Competition schedule ===
G	Group stage	¼	Quarter-finals	½	Semi-finals	B	Bronze medal match	F	Final

Date Event	Sat 6	Sun 7	Mon 8	Tue 9	Wed 10	Thu 11	Fri 12	Sat 13	Sun 14	Mon 15	Tue 16	Wed 17	Thu 18	Fri 19	Sat 20		Sun 21	
Men		G		G		G		G		G		¼		½			B	F
Women	G		G		G		G		G		¼		½		B	F		

== Qualification ==
Qualification for the Olympics were awarded based on a series of tournaments before the event between January 2015 and April 2016. Each National Olympic Committee were allowed to enter one team each for men and women. The host country was guaranteed an entry in each event, as was the winner of the 2015 World Men's Handball Championship. Four more spots were awarded to the winners of continental qualification tournaments for Europe, Africa, Asia, and the Americas. Finally, six places were awarded through three Olympic qualification tournaments. These tournaments were open to the top six teams from the World Championship that had not already qualified as well as six entrants determined through a complex continental qualification algorithm. The twelve teams were divided into three round-robin tournaments featuring four teams, with the top two teams in each tournament qualifying.

== Summary ==
=== Men's competition ===
The semi-finals saw France defeat Germany by a single point, after having a three-point lead at half time. The other semi-final between Poland and Denmark went to extra-time, with the scores tied at 25–25 where Denmark won the match 29–28. The bronze medal match was held between Poland and Germany. The Polish side started hotly and had a 8–5 lead, before the Germans came back and held a 17–13 lead at half-time. Germany pushed the lead to seven points after the third quarter, and eventually won the match 31–25 to win the bronze medal.

The Danish side met the French team in the final. Leading at 16–14 after the first half, Denmark retained their lead to win the match 28–26. This was Denmark's first medal in the handball event at the Olympics, having reached their best, a fourth place in 1984. Danish player Jannick Green "dreamt about one day making" the final, and the team "worked really hard and played well". The result put an end to the French period of dominance at the Olympics, having won the two prior events in 2008 and 2012. French player Luka Karabatic commented "When you’ve got a medal around your neck it’s a little bit different and you can see what you achieved as a team... Getting a silver medal is something unbelievable."

== Results ==
=== Men's competition ===
The competition consisted of two stages; a group stage followed by a knockout stage.

==== Group stage ====
The teams were divided into two groups of six nations, playing every team in their group once. Two points were awarded for a victory, one for a draw. The top four teams per group qualified for the quarter-finals.

===== Group A =====
Pos	Team	Pld	W	D	L	GF	GA	GD	Pts	Qualification
1	Croatia	5	4	0	1	147	134	+13	8 (Note: Croatia 29–28 France)	Quarter-finals
2	France	5	4	0	1	152	126	+26	8	Quarter-finals
3	Denmark	5	3	0	2	136	127	+9	6	Quarter-finals
4	Qatar	5	2	1	2	122	127	−5	5	Quarter-finals
5	Argentina	5	1	0	4	110	126	−16	2	
6	Tunisia	5	0	1	4	118	145	−27	1	

Source: IHF
Rules for classification: 1) Points; 2) Head-to-head points; 3) Head-to-head goal difference; 4) Head-to-head goals scored; 5) Goal difference; 6) Goals scored; 7) Draw.

===== Group B =====
Pos	Team	Pld	W	D	L	GF	GA	GD	Pts	Qualification
1	Germany	5	4	0	1	153	141	+12	8 (Note: Slovenia 25–28 Germany)	Quarter-finals
2	Slovenia	5	4	0	1	137	126	+11	8	Quarter-finals
3	Brazil (H)	5	2	1	2	141	150	−9	5	Quarter-finals
4	Poland	5	2	0	3	139	140	−1	4	Quarter-finals
5	Egypt	5	1	1	3	129	143	−14	3	
6	Sweden	5	1	0	4	132	131	+1	2	

Source: IHF
Rules for classification: 1) Points; 2) Head-to-head points; 3) Head-to-head goal difference; 4) Head-to-head goals scored; 5) Goal difference; 6) Goals scored; 7) Draw.
(H) Hosts

==== Knockout stage ====
Quarter-finals
17 August
Croatia	27
Poland	30
17 August
Denmark	37
Slovenia	30
17 August
Brazil	27
France	34
17 August
Germany	34
Qatar	22

Semi-finals
19 August
Poland	28
Denmark (OT)	29
19 August
France	29
Germany	28

Gold medal
21 August
Denmark	28
France	26
Bronze medal
21 August
4th Poland	25
Germany	31

=== Women's competition ===
The competition consisted of two stages; a group stage followed by a knockout stage.

==== Group stage ====
The teams were divided into two groups of six nations, playing every team in their group once. Two points were awarded for a victory, one for a draw. The top four teams per group qualified for the quarter-finals.

===== Group A =====
Pos	Team	Pld	W	D	L	GF	GA	GD	Pts	Qualification
1	Brazil (H)	5	4	0	1	138	117	+21	8	Quarter-finals
2	Norway	5	4	0	1	141	121	+20	8	Quarter-finals
3	Spain	5	3	0	2	125	116	+9	6	Quarter-finals
4	Angola	5	2	0	3	116	128	−12	4	Quarter-finals
5	Romania	5	2	0	3	108	119	−11	4	
6	Montenegro	5	0	0	5	107	134	−27	0	

Source: IHF
Rules for classification: 1) Points; 2) Head-to-head points; 3) Head-to-head goal difference; 4) Head-to-head goals scored; 5) Goal difference; 6) Goals scored; 7) Draw.
(H) Hosts

===== Group B =====
Pos	Team	Pld	W	D	L	GF	GA	GD	Pts	Qualification
1	Russia	5	5	0	0	165	147	+18	10	Quarter-finals
2	France	5	4	0	1	118	93	+25	8	Quarter-finals
3	Sweden	5	2	1	2	150	141	+9	5	Quarter-finals
4	Netherlands	5	1	2	2	135	135	0	4	Quarter-finals
5	South Korea	5	1	1	3	130	136	−6	3	
6	Argentina	5	0	0	5	101	147	−46	0	

Source: IHF
Rules for classification: 1) Points; 2) Head-to-head points; 3) Head-to-head goal difference; 4) Head-to-head goals scored; 5) Goal difference; 6) Goals scored; 7) Draw.

==== Knockout stage ====
Quarter-finals
16 August
Brazil	23
Netherlands	32
16 August
Spain	26
France (OT)	27
16 August
Sweden	20
Norway	33
16 August
Russia	31
Angola	27

Semi-finals
18 August
Netherlands	23
France	24
18 August
Norway	37
Russia (OT)	38

Gold medal
20 August
France	19
Russia	22
Bronze medal
20 August
Netherlands	26
Norway	36

== Medal summary ==
=== Medalists ===
Below is a full list of players awarded medals at the championships.

Event	Gold	Silver	Bronze
Men	Denmark; Niklas Landin Jacobsen; Mads Christiansen; Mads Mensah Larsen; Casper Ulrich Mortensen; Jesper Nøddesbo; Jannick Green; Lasse Svan Hansen; Rene Toft Hansen; Henrik Mollgaard; Kasper Sondergaard; Henrik Toft Hansen; Mikkel Hansen; Morten Olsen; Michael Damgaard	France; Olivier Nyokas; Daniel Narcisse; Vincent Gérard; Nikola Karabatić; Kentin Mahé; Mathieu Grébille; Thierry Omeyer; Timothey N'Guessan; Luc Abalo; Cedric Sorhaindo; Michael Guigou; Luka Karabatic; Ludovic Fabregas; Adrien Dipanda; Valentin Porte	Germany; Uwe Gensheimer; Finn Lemke; Patrick Wiencek; Tobias Reichmann; Fabian Wiede; Silvio Heinevetter; Hendrik Pekeler; Steffen Weinhold; Martin Strobel; Patrick Groetzki; Kai Häfner; Andreas Wolff; Julius Kühn; Christian Dissinger; Paul Drux
Women	Russia; Anna Sedoykina; Polina Kuznetsova; Daria Dmitrieva; Anna Sen; Olga Akopyan; Anna Vyakhireva; Marina Sudakova; Vladlena Bobrovnikova; Victoria Zhilinskayte; Yekaterina Marennikova; Irina Bliznova; Ekaterina Ilina; Maya Petrova; Tatyana Yerokhina; Victoriya Kalinina	France; Laura Glauser; Blandine Dancette; Camille Ayglon; Allison Pineau; Laurisa Landre; Grace Zaadi; Marie Prouvensier; Amandine Leynaud; Manon Houette; Siraba Dembélé; Chloé Bulleux; Béatrice Edwige; Estelle Nze Minko; Gnonsiane Niombla; Alexandra Lacrabère	Norway; Kari Aalvik Grimsbø; Mari Molid; Emilie Hegh Arntzen; Ida Alstad; Veronica Kristiansen; Heidi Løke; Nora Mørk; Stine Bredal Oftedal; Marit Malm Frafjord; Katrine Lunde; Linn-Kristin Riegelhuth Koren; Amanda Kurtović; Camilla Herrem; Sanna Solberg
