= Sébastien Gardillou =

French handball player and coach (born 1975)

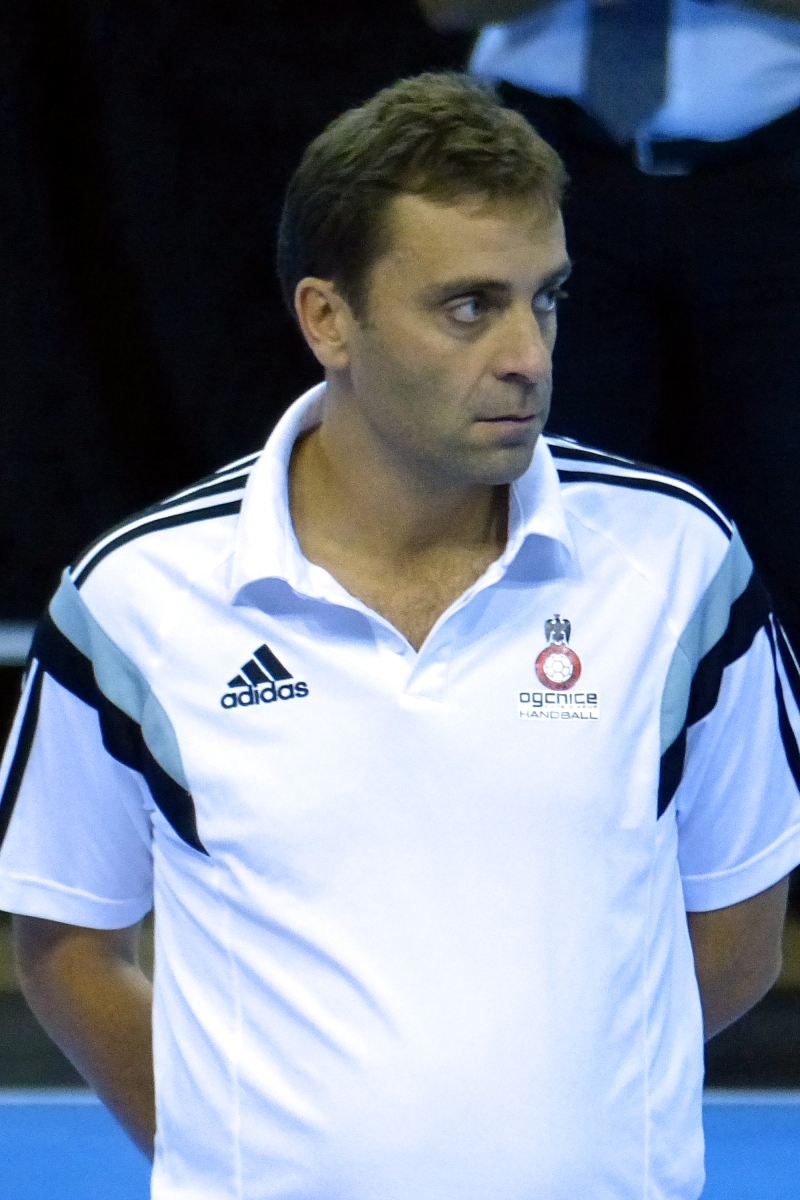
- Gardillou in 2014

Personal information
- Nationality: French
- Born: 29 August 1975 (age 51) Limoges, France

Sport
- Sport: Handball
- Current club: France Women

Senior clubs
- Years: Team
- –: Limoges

Teams managed
- 1997-1999: ASPTT Limoges
- 1999-2001: Grand Poitiers Handball 86
- 2001-2005: France women's U20 coach
- 2005-2010: France Women Video analyst
- 2010-2012: Metz Handball
- 2012-2016: OGC Nice
- 2016-2024: France Women assistant coach
- 2024-: France Women
Medal record
World Championship
Bronze medal – third place	2025 Germany/Netherlands	Coach

Sébastien Gardillou (born 29 august 1975) is French handball coach, who is the head coach of the France women's national handball team. Before becoming the French first team head coach in 2024, he has had multiple positions related to the French national team, including France women's U20 coach, video analyst and most notably the assistant to Olivier Krumbholz from 2016 to 2024.

== Career ==
He started playing handball at ASPTT Limoges in Nationale 3, the 5th tier of French handball. Later he played for CAPO Limoges, where he became a player-coach already at the age of 20. Two years later who got his first coaching position at ASPTT Limoges, where he was for two years.

In the 2010/11 season he won the French League and French cup double with Metz Handball in his first season at the club.

His second season did not go as well, as Metz went without titles and he was fired. He then joined OGC Nice which had just been promoted to Division 1 Feminine.

From 2016 to 2024, he was the assistant to Olivier Krumbholz in a period that is considered one of, if not the most, successful period in the history of the French national team with gold medals both European and World championships.

His first tournament as the head coach was the 2024 European Women's Handball Championship where France finished fourth behind Hungary, Denmark and Norway.

At the 2025 World Championship he won his first medals as French head coach when France won bronze medals losing to Germany in the semifinal and beating Netherlands in extra time in the third place playoff. The French team was affected by many injuries to key players including Méline Nocandy, Laura Glauser, and Estelle Nze Minko.
