= Handball at the 2016 Summer Olympics – Women's tournament =

Women's handball at the XXXI Olympiad

Tournament details
- Host country: Brazil
- Venue: Future Arena
- Dates: 6–20 August 2016
- Teams: 12 (from 4 confederations)

Final positions
- Champions: Russia (1st title)
- Runners-up: France
- Third place: Norway
- Fourth place: Netherlands

Tournament statistics
- Matches played: 38
- Goals scored: 1,978 (52.05 per match)
- Top scorer(s): (Norway) Nora Mørk (62 goals)

Awards
- Best player: (Russia) Anna Vyakhireva

The women's tournament of Handball at the 2016 Summer Olympics at Rio de Janeiro, Brazil, began on 6 August and ended on 20 August 2016. Games were played at the Future Arena.

Russia won their first title after defeating France 22–19 in the final. Norway captured the bronze, and their third consecutive medal by winning against the Netherlands.

The medals were presented by Aïcha Garad Ali, Poul-Erik Høyer Larsen and Auvita Rapilla, IOC members from Djibouti, Denmark and Papua New Guinea respectively and by Hassan Moustafa, Miguel Roca Mas and Per Bertelsen, President, 1st Vice President and Caretaker Chairman of the Commission of Organizing and Competition of the IHF respectively.

== Competition schedule ==
G	Group stage	¼	Quarter-finals	½	Semi-finals	B	Bronze medal match	F	Final

Date Event	Sat 6	Sun 7	Mon 8	Tue 9	Wed 10	Thu 11	Fri 12	Sat 13	Sun 14	Mon 15	Tue 16	Wed 17	Thu 18	Fri 19	Sat 20	
Women	G		G		G		G		G		¼		½		B	F

== Competition format ==
The twelve teams in the tournament were divided into two groups of six, with each team initially playing round-robin games within their group. Following the completion of the round-robin stage, the top four teams from each group advance to the quarter-finals. The two semi-final winners meet for the gold medal match, while the semi-final losers play in the bronze medal match.

== Referees ==
15 pairs of referees were selected on 5 July 2016.

Referees
Brazil	Nilson Menezes; Rogéro Pinto
Czech Republic	Václav Horáček; Jiří Novotný
Denmark	Martin Gjeding; Mads Hansen
Egypt	Mohamed Rashed; Tamer El-Sayed
France	Charlotte Bonaventura; Julie Bonaventura
Germany	Lars Geipel; Marcus Helbig
Iceland	Jónas Elíasson; Anton Pálsson
Iran	Majid Kolahdouzan; Alireza Mousaviyan

Referees
Ivory Coast	Yalatima Coulibaly; Mamadou Diabaté
Macedonia	Gjorgji Nachevski; Slave Nikolov
Norway	Kjersti Arntsen; Guro Røen
Russia	Viktoria Alpaidze; Tatiana Berekzina
Slovenia	David Sok; Bojan Lah
South Korea	Koo Bon-ok; Lee Se-ok
Spain	Óscar Raluy López; Ángel Sabroso Ramírez

== Draw ==
The draw took place on 29 April 2016. The final match schedule was announced on 20 May 2016.

=== Seeding ===
The seeding was announced on 10 April 2016.

Pot 1	Pot 2	Pot 3	Pot 4	Pot 5	Pot 6
Norway; Netherlands	Romania; Russia	Sweden; Montenegro	France; Brazil	Spain; Argentina	South Korea; Angola

== Group stage ==
All times are local (UTC−3).

=== Group A ===
Pos	Team	Pld	W	D	L	GF	GA	GD	Pts	Qualification
1	Brazil (H)	5	4	0	1	138	117	+21	8	Quarter-finals
2	Norway	5	4	0	1	141	121	+20	8	Quarter-finals
3	Spain	5	3	0	2	125	116	+9	6	Quarter-finals
4	Angola	5	2	0	3	116	128	−12	4	Quarter-finals
5	Romania	5	2	0	3	108	119	−11	4	
6	Montenegro	5	0	0	5	107	134	−27	0	

Source: IHF
Rules for classification: 1) Points; 2) Head-to-head points; 3) Head-to-head goal difference; 4) Head-to-head goals scored; 5) Goal difference; 6) Goals scored; 7) Draw.
(H) Hosts

6 August 2016; 09:30	Norway	28–31	Brazil	Future Arena, Rio de Janeiro; Attendance: 7,780; Referees: Horáček, Novotný (CZE)
6 August 2016; 09:30	Mørk 12	(16–17)	Belo 12	Future Arena, Rio de Janeiro; Attendance: 7,780; Referees: Horáček, Novotný (CZE)
6 August 2016; 09:30	2× (yellow card) 2× (suspension)	Report	2× (yellow card) 8× (suspension) 1× (red card)	Future Arena, Rio de Janeiro; Attendance: 7,780; Referees: Horáček, Novotný (CZE)

6 August 2016; 16:40	Montenegro	19–25	Spain	Future Arena, Rio de Janeiro; Attendance: 8,115; Referees: Bonaventura, Bonaventura (FRA)
6 August 2016; 16:40	K. Bulatović 5	(10–14)	four players 4	Future Arena, Rio de Janeiro; Attendance: 8,115; Referees: Bonaventura, Bonaventura (FRA)
6 August 2016; 16:40	2× (yellow card) 4× (suspension)	Report	3× (yellow card) 1× (suspension)	Future Arena, Rio de Janeiro; Attendance: 8,115; Referees: Bonaventura, Bonaventura (FRA)

6 August 2016; 19:50	Romania	19–23	Angola	Future Arena, Rio de Janeiro; Attendance: 4,465; Referees: Koo, Lee (KOR)
6 August 2016; 19:50	Neagu 8	(9–11)	Guialo 5	Future Arena, Rio de Janeiro; Attendance: 4,465; Referees: Koo, Lee (KOR)
6 August 2016; 19:50	2× (yellow card) 2× (suspension)	Report	3× (yellow card) 5× (suspension)	Future Arena, Rio de Janeiro; Attendance: 4,465; Referees: Koo, Lee (KOR)

8 August 2016; 14:40	Spain	24–27	Norway	Future Arena, Rio de Janeiro; Referees: Geipel, Helbig (GER)
8 August 2016; 14:40	Cabral 5	(10–11)	Kristiansen 7	Future Arena, Rio de Janeiro; Referees: Geipel, Helbig (GER)
8 August 2016; 14:40	2× (yellow card) 3× (suspension)	Report	4× (yellow card) 7× (suspension) 1× (red card)	Future Arena, Rio de Janeiro; Referees: Geipel, Helbig (GER)

8 August 2016; 16:40	Brazil	26–13	Romania	Future Arena, Rio de Janeiro; Referees: Bonaventura, Bonaventura (FRA)
8 August 2016; 16:40	Belo 8	(14–9)	Neagu 6	Future Arena, Rio de Janeiro; Referees: Bonaventura, Bonaventura (FRA)
8 August 2016; 16:40	2× (yellow card) 2× (suspension) 1× (red card)	Report	2× (yellow card) 4× (suspension)	Future Arena, Rio de Janeiro; Referees: Bonaventura, Bonaventura (FRA)

8 August 2016; 21:50	Angola	27–25	Montenegro	Future Arena, Rio de Janeiro; Referees: Alpaidze, Berekzina (RUS)
8 August 2016; 21:50	Guialo 7	(12–12)	K. Bulatović 9	Future Arena, Rio de Janeiro; Referees: Alpaidze, Berekzina (RUS)
8 August 2016; 21:50	2× (yellow card) 8× (suspension) 1× (red card)	Report	2× (yellow card) 4× (suspension)	Future Arena, Rio de Janeiro; Referees: Alpaidze, Berekzina (RUS)

10 August 2016; 09:30	Brazil	24–29	Spain	Future Arena, Rio de Janeiro; Referees: Koo, Lee (KOR)
10 August 2016; 09:30	da Silva 7	(12–15)	Pena 8	Future Arena, Rio de Janeiro; Referees: Koo, Lee (KOR)
10 August 2016; 09:30	3× (yellow card) 5× (suspension)	Report	4× (yellow card) 8× (suspension)	Future Arena, Rio de Janeiro; Referees: Koo, Lee (KOR)

10 August 2016; 11:30	Romania	25–21	Montenegro	Future Arena, Rio de Janeiro; Referees: Rashed, El-Sayed (EGY)
10 August 2016; 11:30	Neagu 10	(11–9)	K. Bulatović 9	Future Arena, Rio de Janeiro; Referees: Rashed, El-Sayed (EGY)
10 August 2016; 11:30	3× (yellow card) 4× (suspension)	Report	4× (yellow card) 4× (suspension)	Future Arena, Rio de Janeiro; Referees: Rashed, El-Sayed (EGY)

10 August 2016; 16:40	Norway	30–20	Angola	Future Arena, Rio de Janeiro; Referees: Bonaventura, Bonaventura (FRA)
10 August 2016; 16:40	Mørk 8	(16–8)	Guialo 8	Future Arena, Rio de Janeiro; Referees: Bonaventura, Bonaventura (FRA)
10 August 2016; 16:40	2× (yellow card) 3× (suspension)	Report	2× (yellow card) 4× (suspension) 1× (red card)	Future Arena, Rio de Janeiro; Referees: Bonaventura, Bonaventura (FRA)

12 August 2016; 09:30	Angola	24–28	Brazil	Future Arena, Rio de Janeiro; Referees: Røen, Arntsen (NOR)
12 August 2016; 09:30	Bernardo 8	(13–13)	Belo 7	Future Arena, Rio de Janeiro; Referees: Røen, Arntsen (NOR)
12 August 2016; 09:30	2× (yellow card) 5× (suspension)	Report	4× (yellow card) 4× (suspension)	Future Arena, Rio de Janeiro; Referees: Røen, Arntsen (NOR)

12 August 2016; 14:40	Romania	24–21	Spain	Future Arena, Rio de Janeiro; Referees: Bonaventura, Bonaventura (FRA)
12 August 2016; 14:40	Neagu 9	(13–11)	three players 4	Future Arena, Rio de Janeiro; Referees: Bonaventura, Bonaventura (FRA)
12 August 2016; 14:40	2× (yellow card) 2× (suspension)	Report	3× (yellow card) 1× (suspension)	Future Arena, Rio de Janeiro; Referees: Bonaventura, Bonaventura (FRA)

12 August 2016; 16:40	Montenegro	19–28	Norway	Future Arena, Rio de Janeiro; Referees: Coulibaly, Diabaté (CIV)
12 August 2016; 16:40	Jauković 5	(11–16)	Mørk 6	Future Arena, Rio de Janeiro; Referees: Coulibaly, Diabaté (CIV)
12 August 2016; 16:40	2× (yellow card) 5× (suspension)	Report	3× (yellow card) 4× (suspension)	Future Arena, Rio de Janeiro; Referees: Coulibaly, Diabaté (CIV)

14 August 2016; 09:30	Montenegro	23–29	Brazil	Future Arena, Rio de Janeiro; Referees: Mousaviyan, Kolahdouzan (IRI)
14 August 2016; 09:30	Pavićević 6	(10–12)	Belo 6	Future Arena, Rio de Janeiro; Referees: Mousaviyan, Kolahdouzan (IRI)
14 August 2016; 09:30	4× (yellow card) 5× (suspension)	Report	3× (yellow card) 3× (suspension)	Future Arena, Rio de Janeiro; Referees: Mousaviyan, Kolahdouzan (IRI)

14 August 2016; 16:40	Norway	28–27	Romania	Future Arena, Rio de Janeiro; Referees: Alpaidze, Berekzina (RUS)
14 August 2016; 16:40	Kristiansen 7	(14–13)	Neagu 11	Future Arena, Rio de Janeiro; Referees: Alpaidze, Berekzina (RUS)
14 August 2016; 16:40	3× (yellow card) 6× (suspension)	Report	3× (yellow card) 6× (suspension)	Future Arena, Rio de Janeiro; Referees: Alpaidze, Berekzina (RUS)

14 August 2016; 19:50	Spain	26–22	Angola	Future Arena, Rio de Janeiro; Referees: Pinto, Menezes (BRA)
14 August 2016; 19:50	Cabral, Martín 7	(13–12)	Guialo 6	Future Arena, Rio de Janeiro; Referees: Pinto, Menezes (BRA)
14 August 2016; 19:50	4× (yellow card) 5× (suspension)	Report	3× (yellow card) 8× (suspension) 1× (red card)	Future Arena, Rio de Janeiro; Referees: Pinto, Menezes (BRA)

=== Group B ===
Pos	Team	Pld	W	D	L	GF	GA	GD	Pts	Qualification
1	Russia	5	5	0	0	165	147	+18	10	Quarter-finals
2	France	5	4	0	1	118	93	+25	8	Quarter-finals
3	Sweden	5	2	1	2	150	141	+9	5	Quarter-finals
4	Netherlands	5	1	2	2	135	135	0	4	Quarter-finals
5	South Korea	5	1	1	3	130	136	−6	3	
6	Argentina	5	0	0	5	101	147	−46	0	

Source: IHF
Rules for classification: 1) Points; 2) Head-to-head points; 3) Head-to-head goal difference; 4) Head-to-head goals scored; 5) Goal difference; 6) Goals scored; 7) Draw.

6 August 2016; 11:30	Netherlands	14–18	France	Future Arena, Rio de Janeiro; Referees: Røen, Arntsen (NOR)
6 August 2016; 11:30	three players 3	(6–10)	Lacrabère, Pineau 5	Future Arena, Rio de Janeiro; Referees: Røen, Arntsen (NOR)
6 August 2016; 11:30	3× (yellow card) 5× (suspension)	Report	3× (yellow card) 3× (suspension)	Future Arena, Rio de Janeiro; Referees: Røen, Arntsen (NOR)

6 August 2016; 14:40	Russia	30–25	South Korea	Future Arena, Rio de Janeiro; Referees: Santos, Fonseca (POR)
6 August 2016; 14:40	Sudakova 6	(12–13)	Jung, Kim O. 6	Future Arena, Rio de Janeiro; Referees: Santos, Fonseca (POR)
6 August 2016; 14:40	3× (yellow card) 3× (suspension)	Report	4× (yellow card) 7× (suspension) 1× (red card)	Future Arena, Rio de Janeiro; Referees: Santos, Fonseca (POR)

6 August 2016; 21:50	Sweden	31–21	Argentina	Future Arena, Rio de Janeiro; Referees: Coulibaly, Diabaté (CIV)
6 August 2016; 21:50	Hagman 6	(13–9)	Mendoza 5	Future Arena, Rio de Janeiro; Referees: Coulibaly, Diabaté (CIV)
6 August 2016; 21:50	3× (yellow card) 5× (suspension)	Report	1× (yellow card) 6× (suspension)	Future Arena, Rio de Janeiro; Referees: Coulibaly, Diabaté (CIV)

8 August 2016; 09:30	South Korea	28–31	Sweden	Future Arena, Rio de Janeiro; Referees: Røen, Arntsen (NOR)
8 August 2016; 09:30	Woo 7	(15–16)	Hagman 7	Future Arena, Rio de Janeiro; Referees: Røen, Arntsen (NOR)
8 August 2016; 09:30	4× (yellow card) 3× (suspension)	Report	4× (yellow card) 5× (suspension)	Future Arena, Rio de Janeiro; Referees: Røen, Arntsen (NOR)

8 August 2016; 11:30	France	25–26	Russia	Future Arena, Rio de Janeiro; Referees: Lah, Sok (SLO)
8 August 2016; 11:30	Lacrabère 11	(10–15)	Kuznetsova 6	Future Arena, Rio de Janeiro; Referees: Lah, Sok (SLO)
8 August 2016; 11:30	3× (yellow card) 6× (suspension)	Report	4× (yellow card) 4× (suspension)	Future Arena, Rio de Janeiro; Referees: Lah, Sok (SLO)

8 August 2016; 19:50	Argentina	18–26	Netherlands	Future Arena, Rio de Janeiro; Referees: Mousaviyan, Kolahdouzan (IRI)
8 August 2016; 19:50	Mendoza 3	(9–13)	Polman 6	Future Arena, Rio de Janeiro; Referees: Mousaviyan, Kolahdouzan (IRI)
8 August 2016; 19:50	3× (yellow card) 5× (suspension)	Report	3× (yellow card) 10× (suspension)	Future Arena, Rio de Janeiro; Referees: Mousaviyan, Kolahdouzan (IRI)

10 August 2016; 14:40	Russia	36–34	Sweden	Future Arena, Rio de Janeiro; Referees: Pinto, Menezes (BRA)
10 August 2016; 14:40	Bobrovnikova, Dmitriyeva 6	(15–18)	Gulldén 11	Future Arena, Rio de Janeiro; Referees: Pinto, Menezes (BRA)
10 August 2016; 14:40	4× (yellow card) 3× (suspension) 1× (red card)	Report	3× (yellow card) 6× (suspension) 1× (red card)	Future Arena, Rio de Janeiro; Referees: Pinto, Menezes (BRA)

10 August 2016; 19:50	Netherlands	32–32	South Korea	Future Arena, Rio de Janeiro; Referees: Lopéz, Ramírez (ESP)
10 August 2016; 19:50	Broch, Groot 7	(18–17)	Gwon 11	Future Arena, Rio de Janeiro; Referees: Lopéz, Ramírez (ESP)
10 August 2016; 19:50	3× (yellow card) 5× (suspension)	Report	4× (yellow card) 3× (suspension)	Future Arena, Rio de Janeiro; Referees: Lopéz, Ramírez (ESP)

10 August 2016; 21:50	France	27–11	Argentina	Future Arena, Rio de Janeiro; Referees: Alpaidze, Berezkina (RUS)
10 August 2016; 21:50	Houette 8	(15–4)	Campigli 4	Future Arena, Rio de Janeiro; Referees: Alpaidze, Berezkina (RUS)
10 August 2016; 21:50	3× (yellow card) 4× (suspension)	Report	2× (yellow card) 7× (suspension)	Future Arena, Rio de Janeiro; Referees: Alpaidze, Berezkina (RUS)

12 August 2016; 11:30	Sweden	29–29	Netherlands	Future Arena, Rio de Janeiro; Referees: Alpaidze, Berekzina (RUS)
12 August 2016; 11:30	Hagman 14	(16–13)	Malestein 5	Future Arena, Rio de Janeiro; Referees: Alpaidze, Berekzina (RUS)
12 August 2016; 11:30	3× (yellow card) 3× (suspension)	Report	2× (yellow card) 1× (suspension)	Future Arena, Rio de Janeiro; Referees: Alpaidze, Berekzina (RUS)

12 August 2016; 19:50	Russia	35–29	Argentina	Future Arena, Rio de Janeiro; Referees: Mousaviyan, Kolahdouzan (IRI)
12 August 2016; 19:50	Vyakhireva 7	(20–18)	Pizzo 6	Future Arena, Rio de Janeiro; Referees: Mousaviyan, Kolahdouzan (IRI)
12 August 2016; 19:50	3× (yellow card) 11× (suspension) 1× (red card)	Report	4× (yellow card) 7× (suspension)	Future Arena, Rio de Janeiro; Referees: Mousaviyan, Kolahdouzan (IRI)

12 August 2016; 21:50	South Korea	17–21	France	Future Arena, Rio de Janeiro; Referees: Hansen, Gjeding (DEN)
12 August 2016; 21:50	Song 5	(11–11)	Lacrabère 7	Future Arena, Rio de Janeiro; Referees: Hansen, Gjeding (DEN)
12 August 2016; 21:50	1× (yellow card) 3× (suspension)	Report	4× (yellow card) 6× (suspension)	Future Arena, Rio de Janeiro; Referees: Hansen, Gjeding (DEN)

14 August 2016; 11:30	Sweden	25–27	France	Future Arena, Rio de Janeiro; Referees: Røen, Arntsen (NOR)
14 August 2016; 11:30	Roberts 8	(13–15)	Lacrabère 8	Future Arena, Rio de Janeiro; Referees: Røen, Arntsen (NOR)
14 August 2016; 11:30	2× (yellow card) 2× (suspension)	Report	4× (yellow card) 1× (suspension)	Future Arena, Rio de Janeiro; Referees: Røen, Arntsen (NOR)

14 August 2016; 14:40	Netherlands	34–38	Russia	Future Arena, Rio de Janeiro; Referees: Lah, Sok (SLO)
14 August 2016; 14:40	Polman 12	(16–17)	Ilina 8	Future Arena, Rio de Janeiro; Referees: Lah, Sok (SLO)
14 August 2016; 14:40	3× (yellow card) 6× (suspension)	Report	2× (yellow card) 4× (suspension)	Future Arena, Rio de Janeiro; Referees: Lah, Sok (SLO)

14 August 2016; 21:50	Argentina	22–28	South Korea	Future Arena, Rio de Janeiro; Referees: Bonaventura, Bonaventura (FRA)
14 August 2016; 21:50	Mendoza 6	(10–12)	Gwon 11	Future Arena, Rio de Janeiro; Referees: Bonaventura, Bonaventura (FRA)
14 August 2016; 21:50	3× (yellow card) 5× (suspension)	Report	3× (yellow card) 2× (suspension)	Future Arena, Rio de Janeiro; Referees: Bonaventura, Bonaventura (FRA)

== Knockout stage ==
=== Bracket ===
Quarter-finals
16 August
Brazil	23
Netherlands	32
16 August
Spain	26
France (OT)	27
16 August
Sweden	20
Norway	33
16 August
Russia	31
Angola	27

Semi-finals
18 August
Netherlands	23
France	24
18 August
Norway	37
Russia (OT)	38

Gold medal
20 August
France	19
Russia	22
Bronze medal
20 August
Netherlands	26
Norway	36

=== Quarterfinals ===
16 August 2016; 10:00	Brazil	23–32	Netherlands	Future Arena, Rio de Janeiro; Referees: Arntsen, Røen (NOR)
16 August 2016; 10:00	Da Silva 7	(11–12)	Polman 7	Future Arena, Rio de Janeiro; Referees: Arntsen, Røen (NOR)
16 August 2016; 10:00	4× (yellow card) 6× (suspension)	Report	3× (yellow card) 2× (suspension)	Future Arena, Rio de Janeiro; Referees: Arntsen, Røen (NOR)

16 August 2016
13:30
Spain
26–27 (ET)
France
Future Arena, Rio de Janeiro
Referees: Alpaidze, Berezkina (RUS)
Pena 13
(12–5)
Lacrabère 7
4× (yellow card) 8× (suspension) 1× (red card)
Report
2× (yellow card) 2× (suspension)

FT: 23–23 ET: 3–4

16 August 2016; 17:00	Sweden	20–33	Norway	Future Arena, Rio de Janeiro; Referees: Bonaventura, Bonaventura (FRA)
16 August 2016; 17:00	Gulldén 9	(7–19)	Oftedal 6	Future Arena, Rio de Janeiro; Referees: Bonaventura, Bonaventura (FRA)
16 August 2016; 17:00	3× (yellow card) 1× (suspension)	Report	2× (yellow card) 1× (suspension)	Future Arena, Rio de Janeiro; Referees: Bonaventura, Bonaventura (FRA)

16 August 2016; 20:30	Russia	31–27	Angola	Future Arena, Rio de Janeiro; Referees: Pinto, Menezes (BRA)
16 August 2016; 20:30	Kuznetsova 5	(18–14)	Bernardo 8	Future Arena, Rio de Janeiro; Referees: Pinto, Menezes (BRA)
16 August 2016; 20:30	2× (yellow card) 5× (suspension) 1× (red card)	Report	3× (yellow card) 4× (suspension)	Future Arena, Rio de Janeiro; Referees: Pinto, Menezes (BRA)

=== Semifinals ===
18 August 2016; 15:30	Netherlands	23–24	France	Future Arena, Rio de Janeiro; Referees: Koo, Lee (KOR)
18 August 2016; 15:30	van der Heijden 8	(13–17)	Pineau 7	Future Arena, Rio de Janeiro; Referees: Koo, Lee (KOR)
18 August 2016; 15:30	3× (yellow card) 2× (suspension)	Report	2× (yellow card) 3× (suspension)	Future Arena, Rio de Janeiro; Referees: Koo, Lee (KOR)

18 August 2016
20:30
Norway
37–38 (ET)
Russia
Future Arena, Rio de Janeiro
Referees: Lah, Sok (SLO)
Mørk 14
(16–18)
Bobrovnikova 8
3× (yellow card) 7× (suspension)
Report
4× (yellow card) 5× (suspension)

FT: 31–31 ET: 6–7

=== Bronze medal game ===
20 August 2016; 11:30	Netherlands	26–36	Norway	Future Arena, Rio de Janeiro; Referees: Bonaventura, Bonaventura (FRA)
20 August 2016; 11:30	Groot 6	(13–19)	Mørk 7	Future Arena, Rio de Janeiro; Referees: Bonaventura, Bonaventura (FRA)
20 August 2016; 11:30	3× (yellow card)	Report	1× (yellow card) 1× (suspension)	Future Arena, Rio de Janeiro; Referees: Bonaventura, Bonaventura (FRA)

=== Gold medal game ===
20 August 2016; 15:30	France	19–22	Russia	Future Arena, Rio de Janeiro; Referees: Røen, Arntsen (NOR)
20 August 2016; 15:30	Dembélé, Pineau 5	(7–10)	Vyakhireva 5	Future Arena, Rio de Janeiro; Referees: Røen, Arntsen (NOR)
20 August 2016; 15:30	2× (yellow card) 1× (suspension)	Report	3× (yellow card) 2× (suspension)	Future Arena, Rio de Janeiro; Referees: Røen, Arntsen (NOR)

== Ranking and statistics ==
=== Final ranking ===
Rank	Team
Gold medal	Russia
Silver medal	France
Bronze medal	Norway
4	Netherlands
5	Brazil
6	Spain
7	Sweden
8	Angola
9	Romania
10	South Korea
11	Montenegro
12	Argentina

Source: IHF

=== All Star Team ===
Position	Player
Goalkeeper	Kari Aalvik Grimsbø (NOR)
Left wing	Polina Kuznetsova (RUS)
Left back	Allison Pineau (FRA)
Centre back	Daria Dmitrieva (RUS)
Right back	Alexandra Lacrabère (FRA)
Right wing	Nathalie Hagman (SWE)
Pivot	Heidi Løke (NOR)
Most valuable player	Anna Vyakhireva (RUS)

Source: IHF.com

=== Top goalscorers ===
Rank	Name	Goals	Shots	%
1	(Norway) Nora Mørk	62	96	65
2	(France) Alexandra Lacrabère	46	74	62
3	(Romania) Cristina Neagu	44	79	56
4	(Sweden) Nathalie Hagman	38	62	61
5	(Brazil) Ana Paula Belo	37	65	57
5	(Norway) Veronica Kristiansen	37	65	57
7	(Sweden) Isabelle Gulldén	36	54	67
7	(Netherlands) Estavana Polman	36	69	52
7	(Russia) Anna Vyakhireva	36	53	68
10	(Angola) Isabel Guialo	35	68	51

Source: IHF

=== Top goalkeepers ===
Rank	Name	%	Saves	Shots
1	(France) Laura Glauser	41	45	109
2	(Norway) Kari Aalvik Grimsbø	40	90	227
3	(France) Amandine Leynaud	38	61	161
3	(Spain) Silvia Navarro	38	64	168
5	(Romania) Paula Ungureanu	36	57	158
6	(Sweden) Filippa Idéhn	34	44	130
6	(Russia) Victoriya Kalinina	34	46	137
8	(Brazil) Barbara Arenhart	32	48	151
8	(Argentina) Valentina Kogan	32	44	136
10	4 players	31		

Source: IHF

== Medalists ==
Gold	Silver	Bronze
Russia Anna Sedoykina; Polina Kuznetsova; Daria Dmitrieva; Anna Sen; Olga Akopyan; Anna Vyakhireva; Marina Sudakova; Vladlena Bobrovnikova; Victoria Zhilinskayte; Yekaterina Marennikova; Irina Bliznova; Ekaterina Ilina; Maya Petrova; Tatyana Yerokhina; Victoriya Kalinina Head coach: Yevgeni Trefilov	France Laura Glauser; Blandine Dancette; Camille Ayglon; Allison Pineau; Laurisa Landre; Grace Zaadi; Marie Prouvensier; Amandine Leynaud; Manon Houette; Siraba Dembélé; Chloé Bulleux; Tamara Horacek; Béatrice Edwige; Estelle Nze Minko; Gnonsiane Niombla; Alexandra Lacrabère Head coach: Olivier Krumbholz	Norway Kari Aalvik Grimsbø; Mari Molid; Emilie Hegh Arntzen; Veronica Kristiansen; Ida Alstad; Heidi Løke; Nora Mørk; Stine Bredal Oftedal; Marit Malm Frafjord; Katrine Lunde; Linn-Kristin Riegelhuth Koren; Amanda Kurtović; Camilla Herrem; Sanna Solberg Head coach: Thorir Hergeirsson
