= Siraba Dembélé Pavlović =

French handball player (born 1986)

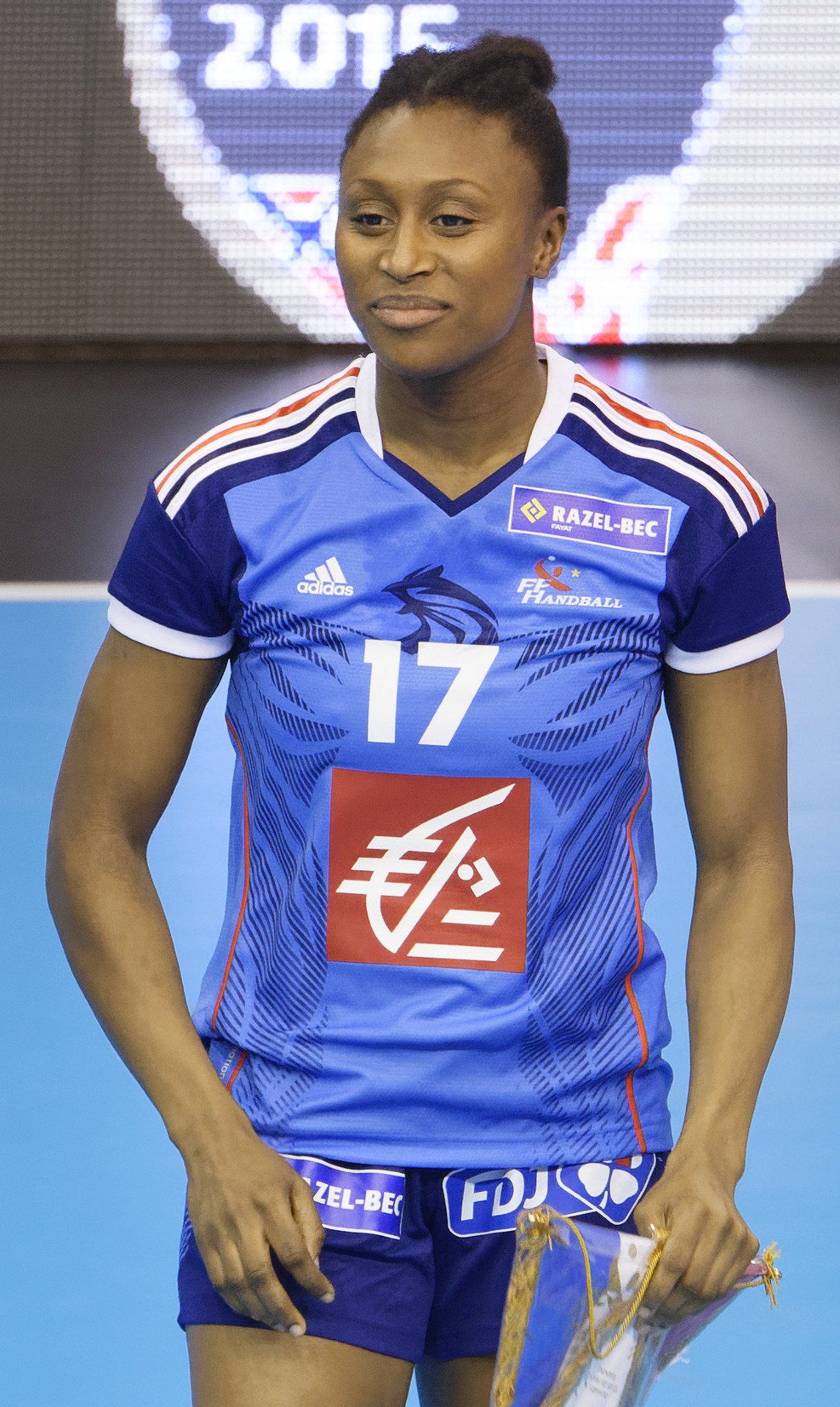
- Pavlović in 2015

Personal information
- Nationality: French
- Born: 28 June 1986 (age 40) Dreux, France
- Height: 1.72 m (5 ft 8 in)

Sport
- Sport: Handball
- Position: Left wing
- Current club: CSM București
- Number: 28

Youth career
- Years: Team
- 1996-2003: HBC Vallée d'Avre

Senior clubs
- Years: Team
- 2003–2004: Dreux AC
- 2004–2008: Mérignac Handball
- 2008–2009: Issy-les-Moulineaux
- 2009–2012: Toulon Saint-Cyr
- 2012–2013: Randers HK
- 2013–2016: HC Vardar
- 2016–2018: Rostov-Don
- 2018–2020: Toulon Saint-Cyr
- 2020–2023: CSM București
National team
Years	Team	Apps	(Gls)
2006–2021	France	291	(848)
Medal record
Olympic Games
Silver medal – second place	2016 Rio de Janeiro	Team
World Championship
Gold medal – first place	2017 Germany
Silver medal – second place	2009 China
Silver medal – second place	2011 Brazil
European Championship
Gold medal – first place	2018 France
Silver medal – second place	2020 Denmark
Bronze medal – third place	2016 Sweden
Mediterranean Games
Gold medal – first place	2009 Pescara	Team
- Updated on 22 June 2023

Siraba Dembélé Pavlović (née Siraba Dembélé; born 28 June 1986) is a French retired professional handballer who most recently played as a left wing for CSM București and is a retired captain for the French national team, where she has won both the World Championship and European Championship.

She has played the 2nd most matches for the French national team ever, behind Isabelle Wendling and scored the 2nd most goals for the French national team behind Véronique Pecqueux-Rolland.

== Career ==
Pavlović started playing handball in 1996 at Vallée d'Avre. In 2003 she and the club was promoted to Nationale 3, the 5th tier of French handball. In 2003, she joined Dreux AC and a year later the elite club Mérignac Handball. She debuted in the French top league on September 18th 2004 against Fleury. She then played for Issy-les-Moulineaux for a year before joining Toulon Saint-Cyr Var Handball. Here, she won the French championship in 2010 and the French cup in 2011 and 2012.

In 2012, she joined the Danish club Randers HK. In 2013, she joined Macedonian RK Vardar. Here, she won the Macedonian league and cup double in 2014, 2015, and 2016.

In 2016, she joined Rostov-Don. Here, she won the EHF European League in 2017 and the Russian championship in 2017 and 2018.

In 2018, she returned to Toulon Saint-Cyr Var Handball.

In 2020, she joined Romanian CSM București. In April 2021 she ruptured her ACL. With CSM București, she won the Romanian championship in 2021 and 2023 and the Romanian cup in 2022 and 2023. After the 2022/23 season, she retired.

=== National team ===
Pavlović debuted for the national team on May 26, 2006, against Turkey. She reached the final of the 2012 Olympics with the French team.

In 2017, she won the World Championship in Germany. On that occasion, she was included the tournament all-star team.

She won another gold medal for France at the 2018 European Women's Handball Championship at home. This was the first time France won the tournament.

She retired from the national team in 2021, two years before retiring from professional handball all together.

== International honours ==
- EHF Cup:
  - Winner: 2017
- EHF Challenge Cup:
  - Finalist: 2008
- World Championship:
  - Winner: 2017
  - Silver Medalist: 2009, 2011
- European Championship:
  - Winner: 2018
  - Bronze Medalist: 2006, 2016
- Olympic Games:
  - Silver Medalist: 2016

== Individual awards ==
- All-Star Left Wing of the EHF Champions League: 2015, 2018
- All-Star Left Wing of the Championnat de France: 2008, 2009, 2010, 2011, 2012
- Championnat de France MVP: 2011

== Personal life ==
In November 2019, she gave birth to twins. Her husband is the Montenegrin ex football goalkeeper Igor Pavlović.

She is of Malian descent. Among her family, Rasanké (a dialect closely related to Bambara) is spoken.
