= Golden League =

Golden League may refer to:

- Golden League (California), a high-school athletic conference in Los Angeles County
- Golden League (handball), a competition for European national teams; see 2014–15 Golden League
- Golden Baseball League
- IAAF Golden League
- BIGBANK Kuldliiga, Estonian defunct annual series of outdoor track and field meetings
- CEV Volleyball Golden European League, part of 2018 Men's European Volleyball League and 2018 Women's European Volleyball League
- Golden League (Judo): former name of the European Judo Club Championships
- Golden League (1586), an alliance of Switzerland's Catholic cantons, initiated by Ludwig Pfyffer
- Ligue d'Or, the premier basketball league of the Ivory Coast
