= Olivier Krumbholz =

French handball coach (born 1958)

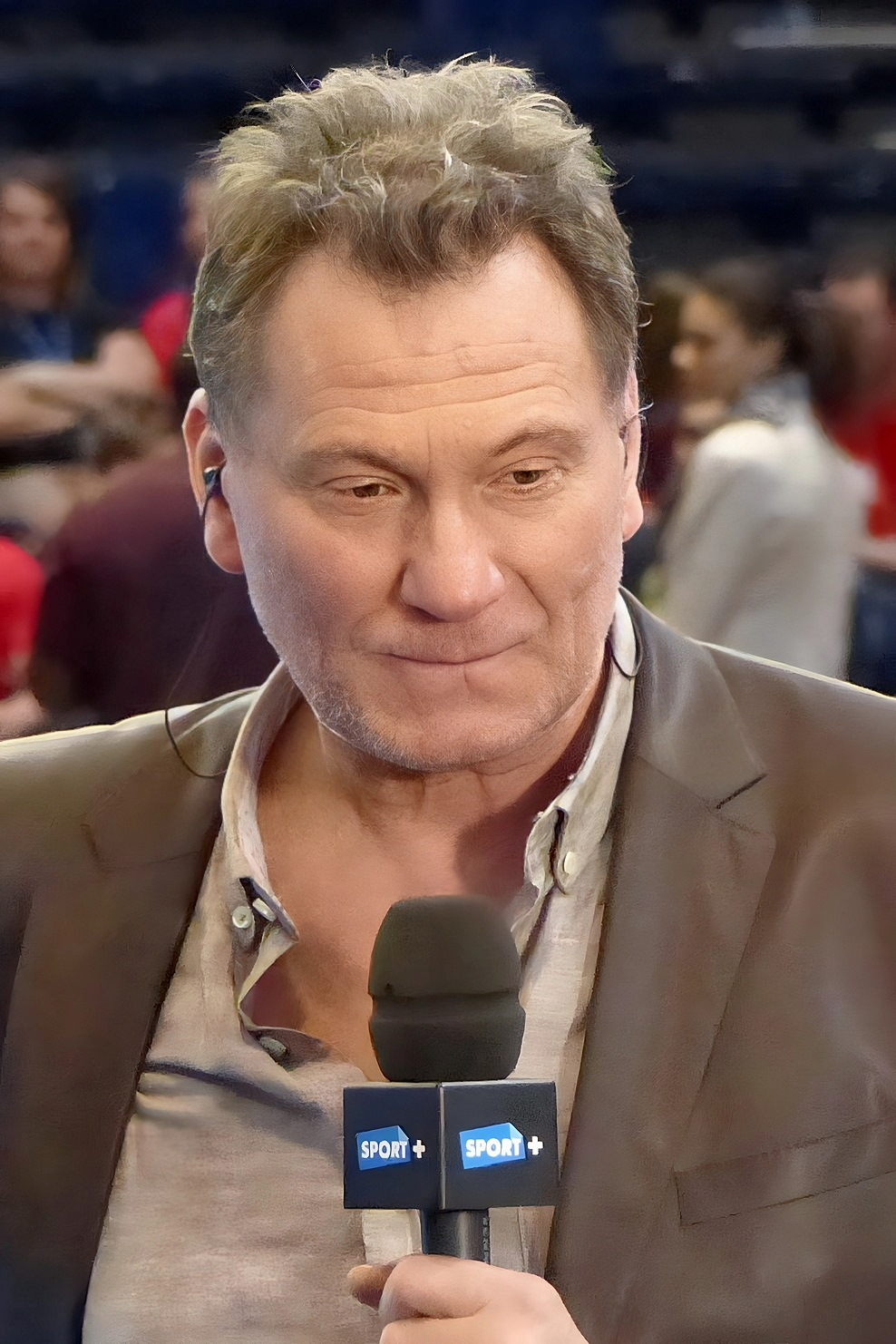
- Krumbholz in 2014

Personal information
- Nationality: French
- Born: 12 September 1958 (age 68) Longeville-lès-Metz, France

Sport
- Sport: Handball

Senior clubs
- Years: Team
- 1976–1986: SMEC Metz
National team
Years	Team	Apps
1983	France	9

Teams managed
- 1986–1995: Metz Handball
- 1992–1998: France women's junior
- 1998–2013: France women
- 2016–2024: France women
Medal record
Women's handball
Representing France
Olympic Games
Gold medal – first place	2020 Tokyo	Team
Silver medal – second place	2016 Rio de Janeiro	Team
Silver medal – second place	2024 Paris	Team
World Championship
Gold medal – first place	2003 Croatia	Team
Gold medal – first place	2017 Germany	Team
Gold medal – first place	2023 Denmark/Norway/Sweden	Team
Silver medal – second place	1999 Denmark/Norway	Team
Silver medal – second place	2009 China	Team
Silver medal – second place	2011 Brazil	Team
Silver medal – second place	2021 Spain	Team
European Championship
Gold medal – first place	2018 France	Team
Silver medal – second place	2020 Denmark	Team
Bronze medal – third place	2002 Denmark	Team
Bronze medal – third place	2006 Sweden	Team
Bronze medal – third place	2016 Sweden	Team

Olivier Krumbholz (born 12 September 1958) is a French handball coach of German descent who was the head coach for the French women's national team in two periods from 1998-2013 and again from 2016-2024. He is considered one of the most successful national team coaches of all time and the best French women's coach of all time.

He was made Chevalier (knight) of the Ordre national du Mérite in 2020.

In both 2010 and 2018, he was named the best women's handball coach in the world by the International Handball Federation.

== Career ==
Krumbholz played in his active years for SMEC Metz. He played 9 matches for the French national team.

His first coaching position at the age of 28 was at the Division 1 Feminine team ASPTT Metz. Here, he was between 1986 and 1995. In that time, he won French Championship in 1989, 1990, 1993, 1994, and 1995 and the French cup in 1990 and 1994.

In 1992, he became the coach of the France women's junior team.

In 1998, he upgraded from the youth national team to the senior national team. In his first major international tournament, the 1999 World Women's Handball Championship, he won silver medals with the French team.

He led the French team to victory at the 2003 World Women's Handball Championship in Croatia, which was the first ever French gold at any major international tournament. Later coached the team at the 2004 Summer Olympics and the 2008 Summer Olympics.

He was coach for the French team at the 2009 World Women's Handball Championship in China, where the French team has reached the final, where they lost to Russia 22:25.

He left the position in 2013, to be replaced by Alain Portes, and in turn replaced Portes again, when he returned to the French national team in 2016. In his first tournament back he won silver medals at the 2016 Olympics. A year later, he won the 2017 World Women's Handball Championship. In 2018 he won the 2018 European Women's Handball Championship at home, which was France's first ever European Championship.

At the 2020 Olympics, he completed his collection of major tournament wins, when he won gold medals at the 2020 Olympics in Tokyo.

After the 2024 Olympics, where he won silver medals with the French team, he retired from the French national team.

He was replaced by his former assistant from 2016 to 2024, Sébastien Gardillou.

== Personal life ==
He is married to former French international handball player Corinne Krumbholz, who he coached at Metz Handball.
