= Handball Cercle Nîmes =

French handball club

- Full name: Handball Cercle Nîmes
- Short name: HBC Nîmes
- Founded: November 23, 1971; 54 years ago
- Dissolved: March 8, 2016; 10 years ago
- Arena: Le Parnasse, Nîmes
- Capacity: 4191
- President: Bertrand Roux (FRA)
- Head coach: Christophe Chagnard (FRA)
- League: Division 1
- 2014–15: 4th
- Club colours
Home	Away

Handball Cercle Nimes was a French women's handball club from Nimes playing in the French Championship. It was established in 1971 and dissolved in 2016.

Nimes' was one of the leading teams in the Challenge Cup, having won the competition in 2001 and 2009. Its major success in other EHF competitions was reaching the 2012 EHF Cup quarterfinals. It reached the national cup's final in 1999, 2003 and 2011 and the League Cup's final in 2010, losing to ASPTT Metz, ES Besançon and Toulon Handball.

== History ==
The club was founded by Dr. Remezy in 1971 and started in the regional leagues. In 1976 they reached the National II for the first time.

In 1982 they changed their name to HBC Juvenel Nîmes. In 1991 they were promoted to the second tier for the first time.

In the 1994-95 season they were promoted to the Division 1 for the first time.

In the 2000-01 season they won the EHF Challenge Cup for the first time, beating Croatian ŽRK Split in the final.

The club was dissolved on 8 March 2016 due to financial difficulties.

== Titles ==
- Challenge Cup
  - 2001, 2009

== Notable former players ==
- (France) Camille Ayglon
- (France) Chloé Bulleux
- (France) Blandine Dancette
- (France) Joanne Dudziak
- (France) Estelle Nze Minko
- (France) Allison Pineau
- (Tunisia) Mouna Chebbah
- (Tunisia) Rafika Marzouk
- (Slovenia) Nina Jeriček
