= Blandine Dancette =

French handball player (born 1988)

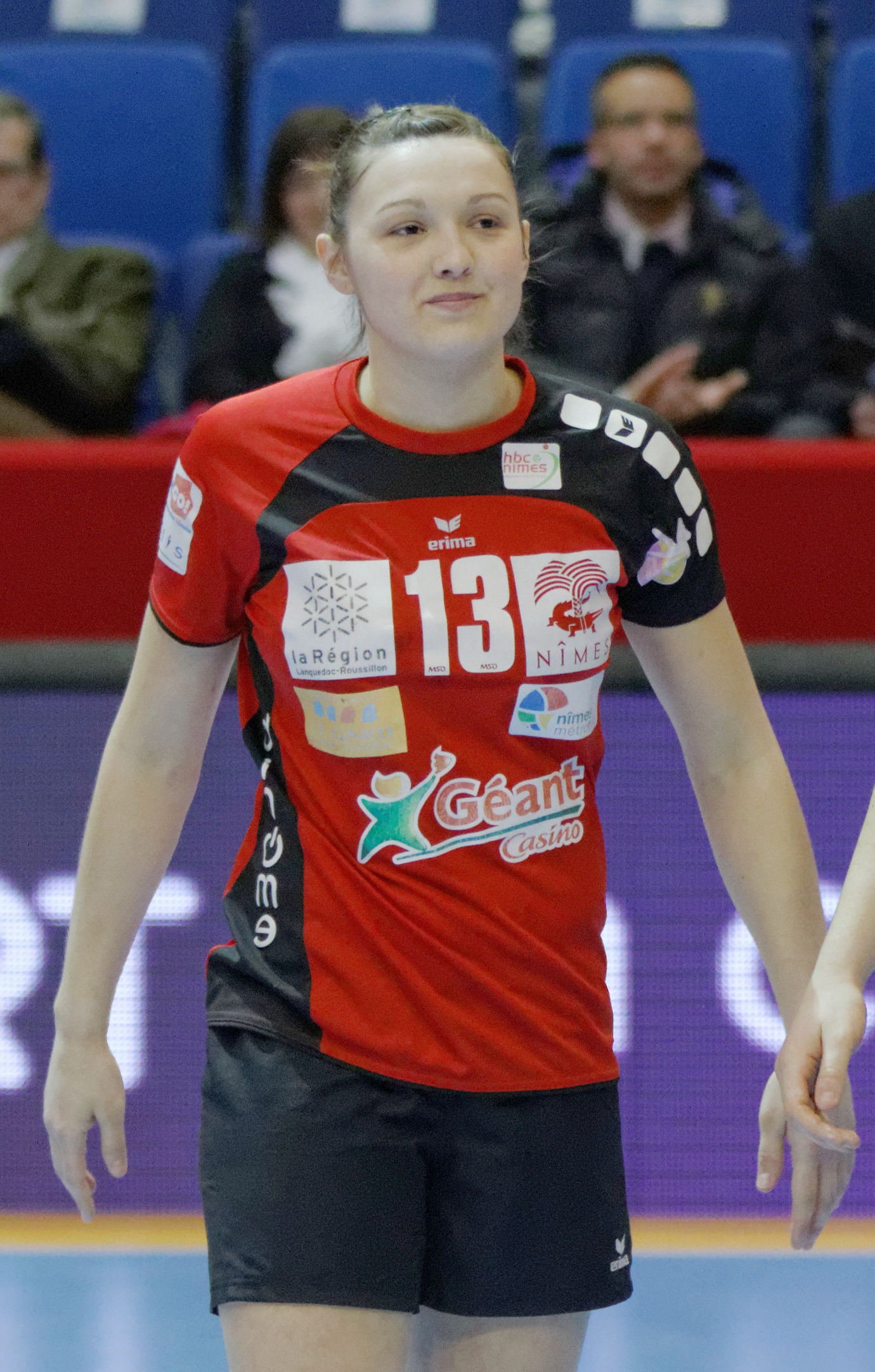
- Dancette in 2013

Personal information
- Nationality: French
- Born: 14 February 1988 (age 38) Firminy, France
- Height: 1.69 m (5 ft 7 in)

Sport
- Sport: Handball
- Position: Right wing
- Current club: Retired

Senior clubs
- Years: Team
- 1999-2006: HB Saint-Étienne Andrézieux
- 2006-2016: Handball Cercle Nîmes
- 2016-2017: Chambray Touraine Handball
- 2017-2021: Nantes Loire Atlantique Handball
National team
Years	Team	Apps	(Gls)
2009-2021	France	115	(147)
Medal record
Event	1st	2nd	3rd
Olympic Games	1	1	0
World Championship	1	1	0
Mediterranean Games	1	0	0
Total	3	2	0
Women's Handball
Representing France
Olympic Games
Gold medal – first place	2020 Tokyo	Team
Silver medal – second place	2016 Rio de Janeiro	Team
World Championship
Gold medal – first place	2017 Germany	
Silver medal – second place	2011 Brazil	
Mediterranean Games
Gold medal – first place	2009 Pescara	Team

Blandine Dancette (born 14 February 1988) is a French former handball player. She retired in 2021 while playing for Nantes Handball. She played for the French national team. She played for HB Saint-Étienne Andrézieux, Handball Cercle Nîmes, Chambray Touraine Handball and Nantes Loire Atlantique Handball. She retired in 2021.

== Career ==
Dancette started her career in 1999 at HB Saint-Étienne Andrézieux. In 2006 she joined Handball Cercle Nîmes. With them she won the 2009 EHF Challenge Cup. In 2009, she was named French Division 1 Newcomer of the Year.

In 2016 she joined league rivals Chambray Touraine Handball. A year later she joined Nantes Loire Atlantique Handball. Here she won the 2020-21 EHF European League.

She retired after the 2020-21 season.

=== National team ===
Dancette played for various french youth national teams. On 28 June 2009 she made for senior debut for the French national team against Serbia.

She participated in the 2011 World Women's Handball Championship and 2012, 2016 Olympics, winning a silver medal at the 2016 Olympics. and 2020 Olympics, winning the first gold medal at the 2020 Olympics.

At the 2017 World Championship she won gold medals with the French team.
