= Chloé Bulleux =

French handball player (born 1991)

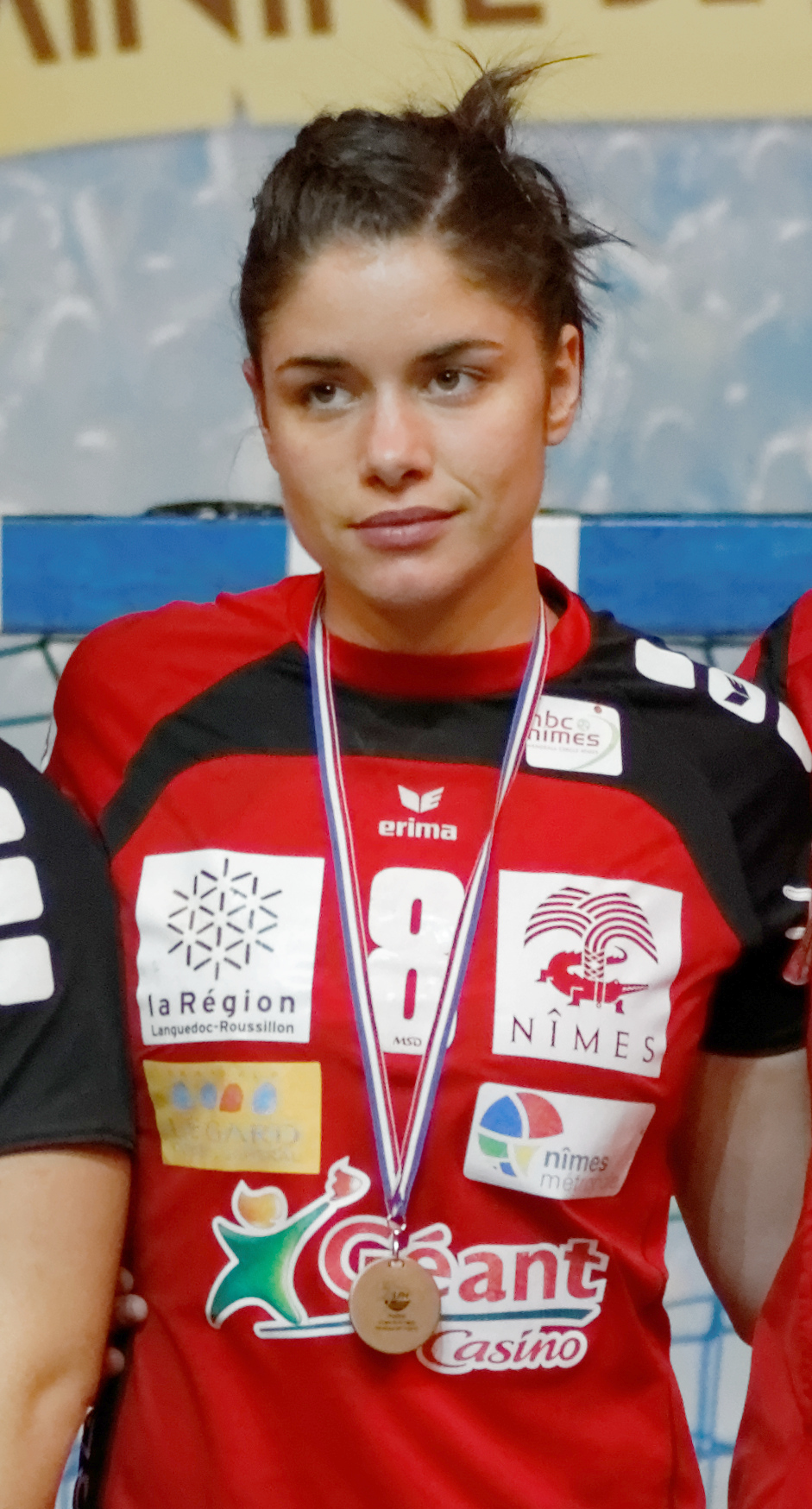
- Bulleux in 2013

Personal information
- Nationality: French
- Born: 18 November 1991 (age 34) Annecy, France
- Height: 1.72 m (5 ft 8 in)

Sport
- Sport: Handball
- Position: Right wing
- Current club: Paris 92

Senior clubs
- Years: Team
- 2008-2013: (France) HBC Nîmes
- 2013-09/2014: (France) Metz Handball
- 09/2014-11/2015: (France) Union Mios Biganos-Bègles
- 11/2015-2016: (France) HBC Nîmes
- 2016-2017: (Hungary) Siófok KC
- 2017-2019: (France) Paris 92
- 2019-: (France) Toulon Saint-Cyr VHB
National team
Years	Team	Apps	(Gls)
2015-	France	26	(45)
Medal record
Olympic Games
Silver medal – second place	2016 Rio de Janeiro	Team

Chloé Bulleux (born 18 November 1991) is a French handball player who competes for club Issy Paris. She is also member of the French national team. She competed at the 2015 World Women's Handball Championship and 2016 Olympics. In February 2015 she was named the French Division 1 league Player of the Month.
