= Laurisa Landre =

French handball player (born 1985)

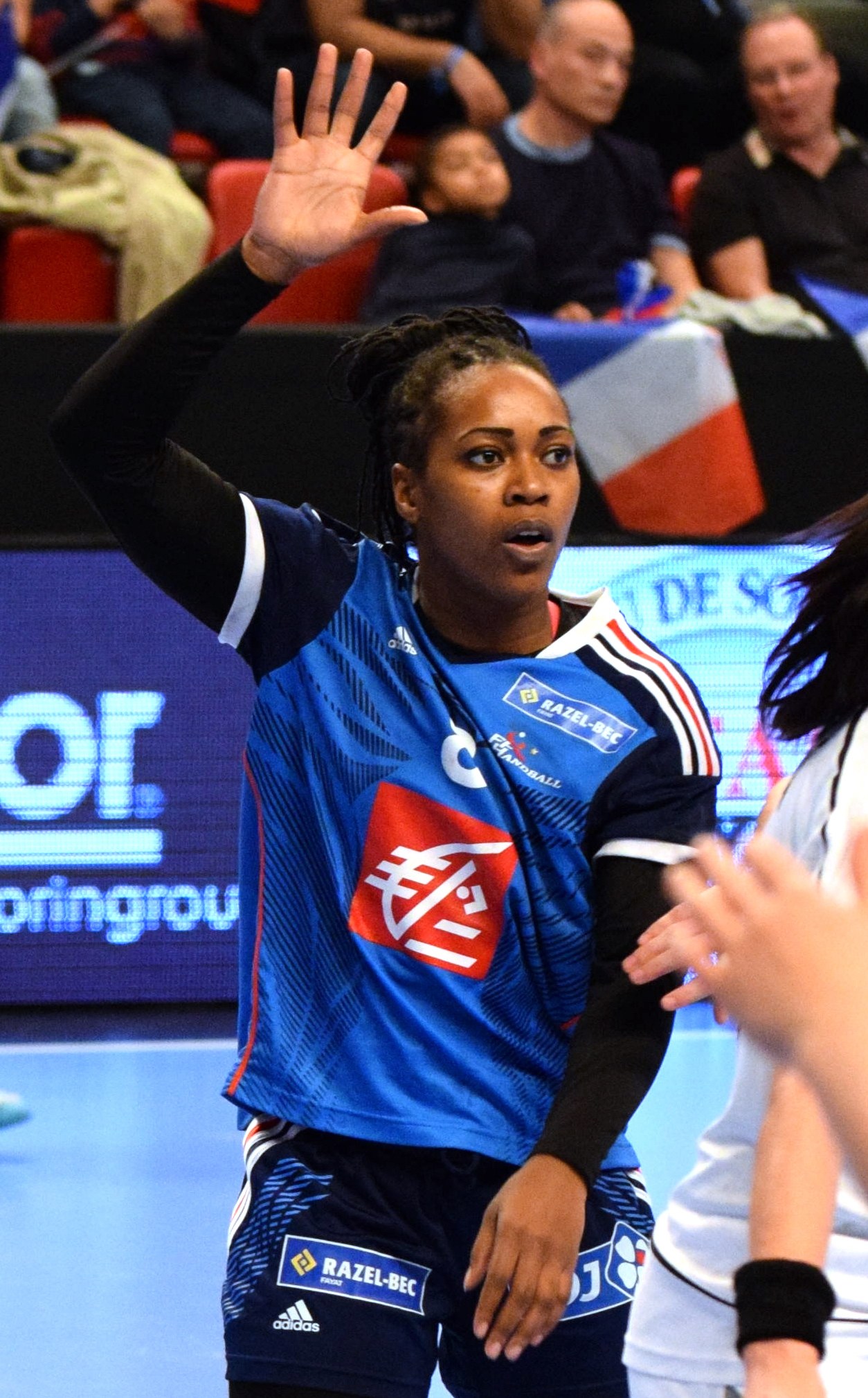
- Landre in 2015

Personal information
- Nationality: French
- Born: 27 October 1985 (age 40) Pointe-à-Pitre, Guadeloupe, France
- Height: 1.74 m (5 ft 9 in)

Sport
- Sport: Handball
- Position: Pivot

Senior clubs
- Years: Team
- 2004–2012: Fleury Loiret HB
- 2012–2015: Le Havre
- 2015–2017: S.C.M. Craiova
- 2017–2018: Metz Handball
- 2018–2020: Toulon Handball
National team
Years	Team	Apps	(Gls)
2014–2020	France	84	(145)
Medal record
Olympic Games
Silver medal – second place	2016 Rio de Janeiro	Team
World Championship
Gold medal – first place	2017 Germany
European Championship
Bronze medal – third place	2016 Sweden

Laurisa Landre (born 27 October 1985) is a French former handball player, who played for the French national team.

== Career ==
Landre started playing in 2003 for the French team Fleury Loiret HB. In the 2011/12 season she reached the EHF Challenge Cup semifinal.

In 2012 she joined Le Havre AC.

Due to the financial difficulties of Le Havre, she joined Romanian side S.C.M. Craiova in 2015.

In 2017 she reached the final of the Romanian cup. The following summer she returned to France to join Metz Handball, where she won the French Championship in the first season. A season later she transferred to Toulon Saint-Cyr Var Handball.

She retired in 2020.

=== National team ===
She made her debut for the French national team on 11 June 2014 against Slovakia.

Her first major international tournament was the 2015 World Women's Handball Championship in Denmark.

At the 2016 Olympics she won silver medals, losing to Russia in the final. Later the same year, she won bronze medals at the 2016 European Championship.

At the 2017 World Championship she won her first title with France.

== Individual awards ==
- French Championship Best Pivot: 2013, 2014
