= Béatrice Edwige =

French handball player (born 1988)

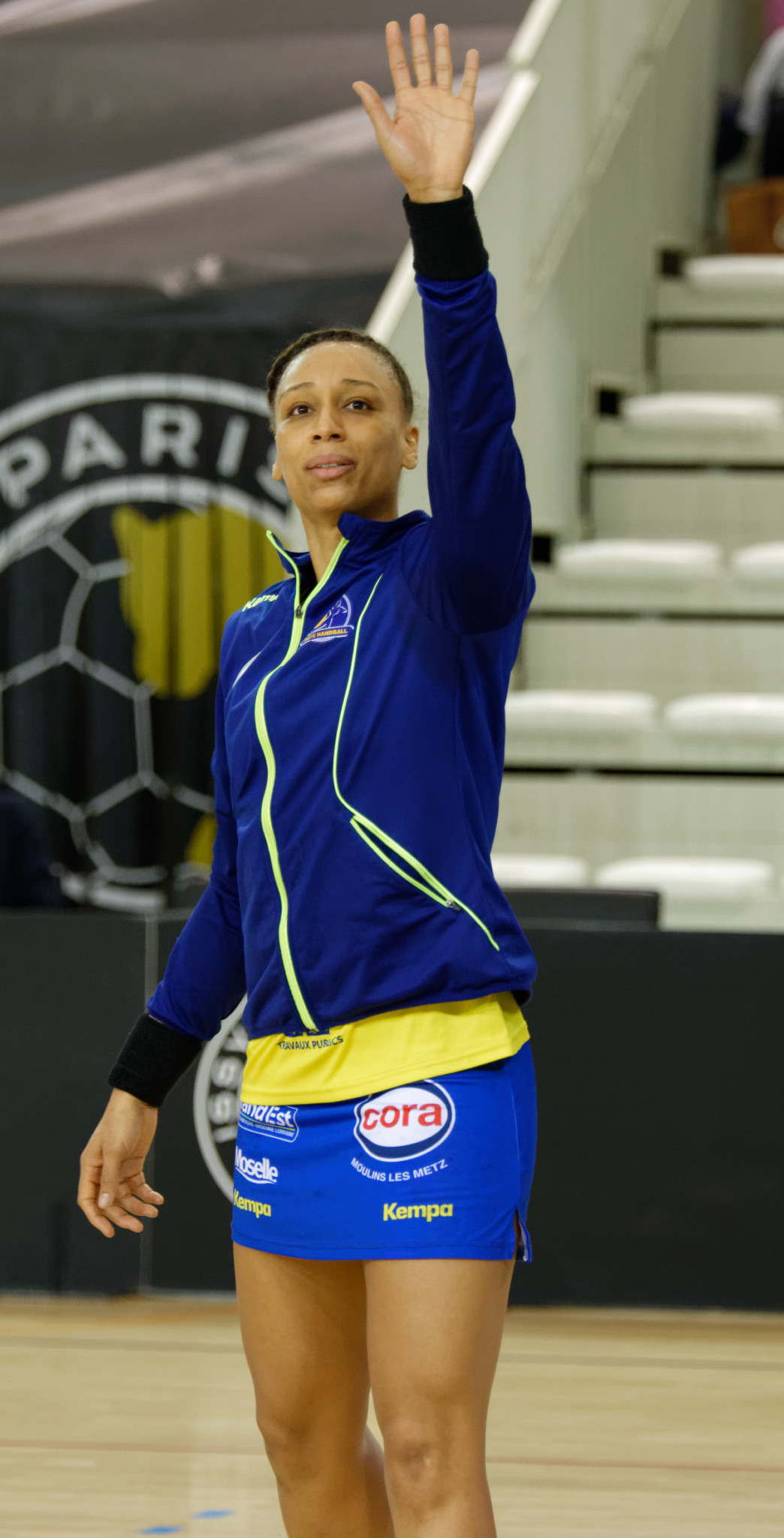
- Edwige in 2018

Personal information
- Nationality: French
- Born: 3 October 1988 (age 38) Paris, France
- Height: 1.82 m (6 ft 0 in)

Sport
- Sport: Handball
- Position: Pivot
- Current club: Ikast Håndbold
- Number: 24

Senior clubs
- Years: Team
- 2004–2009: Celles-sur-Belle
- 2009–2014: Jeanne d'Arc Dijon Handball
- 2014–2016: OGC Nice Côte d'Azur Handball
- 2016–2019: Metz Handball
- 2019–2021: Győri ETO KC
- 2021–02/2022: Rostov-Don
- 03/2022–2025: Ferencvárosi TC
- 09/2025–12/2025: Ikast Håndbold
National team
| Years | Team | Apps | (Gls) |
| 2013–2024 | France | 148 | (112) |
Medal record
Olympic Games
| Gold medal – first place | 2020 Tokyo | Team |
| Silver medal – second place | 2016 Rio de Janeiro | Team |
World Championship
| Gold medal – first place | 2017 Germany |
| Silver medal – second place | 2021 Spain |
European Championship
| Gold medal – first place | 2018 France |
| Silver medal – second place | 2020 Denmark |
| Bronze medal – third place | 2016 Sweden |

Béatrice Edwige (born 3 October 1988) is a French handball player, who previously played for Ikast Håndbold and the French national team.

== Career ==
Edwige was born in Paris and grew up in French Guiana. She moved back to France when she was eleven. Here she played for HBC Celles-sur-Belle from 2004 to 2009. She then joined 1. division side Cercle Dijon Bourgogne. When the team was relegated in 2013, she stayed at the club despite an active release clause.

In the summer of 2014 she joined OGC Nice Côte d'Azur Handball, where she played for 2 years before joining Metz Handball. Here she won the French Championship in 2017, 2018 and 2019 and the French Cup in 2017 nd 2019.

In 2019 she joined Hungarian side Győri ETO KC. Here she won the Hungarian Cup in 2021. Afterwards she joined Russian side Rostov-Don. Already in February in her first season she left Rostov-Don due to the Russian invasion of Ukraine, and moved back to Hungary. Here she joined Ferencvárosi TC on loan, where she once again won the Hungarian Cup. After the season she joined Ferencváros on a permanent basis.

In the 2022-23 season she won the Hungarian Cup for a third time, although Edwige was out with a cruciate ligament tear from the end of 2022 and the rest of the season. After her comeback she won the Hungarian Championship in 2024 and the Hungarian Cup in 2024 and 2025.

In September 2025 she joined Danish side Ikast Håndbold.

=== National team ===
Edwige made her debut for the French national team in a qualification game for the 2013 World Championship.

Her first major international tournament was the 2015 World Women's Handball Championship in Denmark.

At the 2016 Olympics she won silver medals, losing to Russia in the final. Later the same year, she won bronze medals at the 2016 European Championship. At this occasion she was part of the tournament all star team as the best defender.

At the 2017 World Championship she won her first title with France. A year later she won the 2018 European Championship on home soil. This was the first time France won the tournament. She scored 38 goals during the tournament.

At the 2020 European Championship she was part of the French team that won silver medals, losing to Norway in the final. She scored 2 goals during the tournament.

At the 2021 Olympics she was part of the French team that won Gold medals, the first for France. Edwige scored 4 goals during the tournament. Later the same year she won silver medals at the 2021 World Championship, once again losing to Norway in the final.

== Achievements ==
- French Championship:
  - Winner: 2014, 2017, 2018, 2019
- French Cup:
  - Winner: 2017, 2019
  - Finalist: 2013
- French League Cup:
  - Finalist: 2016
- Nemzeti Bajnokság I:
  - Finalist: 2021, 2022
- Magyar Kupa:
  - Winner: 2021, 2022, 2023, 2024, 2025
- Russia SuperCup:
  - Winner: 2021
- EHF Champions League:
  - Finalist: 2023
  - Semifinalist: 2019, 2021

== Individual awards ==
- All-Star Team Best Defense Player of the 2016 European Women's Handball Championship
- Championnat de France Best Defense Player: 2015, 2019
- Championnat de France Best Line Player: 2019
