= Isabelle Wendling =

French handball player (born 1971)

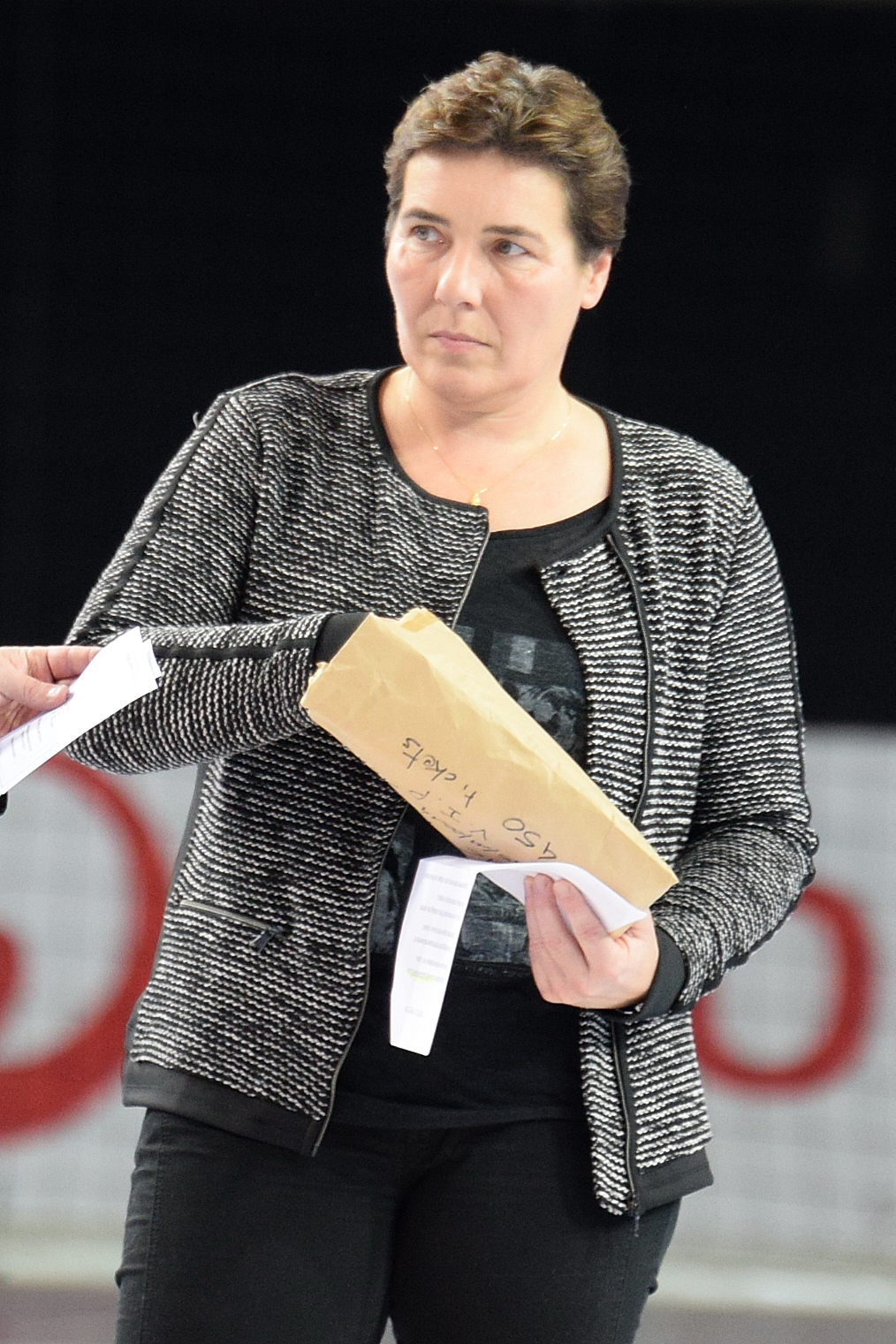
- Wendling in 2014

Personal information
- Born: 30 January 1971 (age 55) Boulay-Moselle, France
- Height: 178 cm (70 in)

Sport
- Sport: Handball
- Position: pivot

Youth career
- Years: Team
- –: CESC Handball Boulay
- –: Stade Messin EC

Senior clubs
- Years: Team
- 1989-2010: Metz Handball
National team
Years	Team	Apps	(Gls)
1993-2008	France	338	(543)
Medal record
Women's handball
Representing France
World Championship
Gold medal – first place	2003 Croatia	Team
Silver medal – second place	1999 Denmark/Norway	Team
European Championship
Bronze medal – third place	2002 Denmark	Team
Bronze medal – third place	2006 Sweden	Team
Mediterranean Games
Gold medal – first place	1997 Bari	Team
Gold medal – first place	2001 Tunis	Team

Isabelle Wendling (born 30 January 1971 in Boulay-Moselle) is a French handball player and member of a former World Champion France national team.

She became World Champion in 2003, when France won the 2003 World Women's Handball Championship in Croatia, and Wendling was selected for the All-Star team, as pivot.

She represented France at three Olympiads: at the 2000 Summer Olympics in Sydney, when France placed 6th, at the 2004 Summer Olympics in Athens, where the France national team placed 4th, and finishing 5th at the 2008 Summer Olympics in Beijing.

She has the record for most matches for French national team with 338 matches. She also has the 9th most goals for the French national team.
