= Marina Sudakova =

Russian handball player (born 1989)

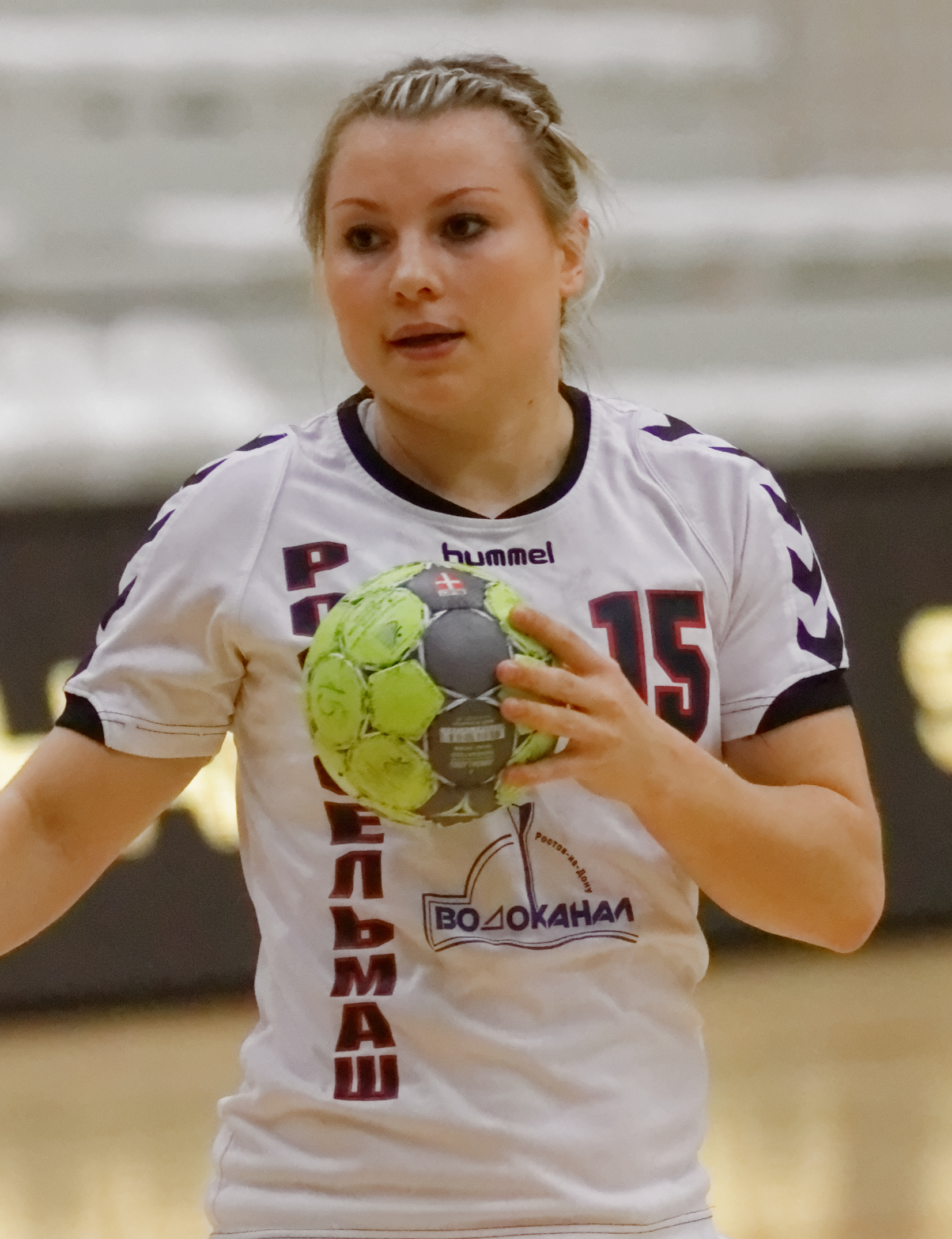
- Sudakova in 2013

Personal information
- Full name: Marina Vladimirovna Sudakova
- Nationality: Russian
- Born: 17 February 1989 (age 37) Volgograd, Russian SFSR, Soviet Union
- Height: 1.64 m (5 ft 5 in)

Sport
- Sport: Handball
- Position: Right wing
- Current club: Retired

Senior clubs
- Years: Team
- –2016: Rostov-Don
- 2016–2017: HC Kuban Krasnodar
- 2017–2020: Rostov-Don
- 2020–2022: CSKA Moscow
- 2022–2023: CSM București
- 2023–2024: Dinamo Volgograd
National team
Years	Team	Apps	(Gls)
–	Russia	100	(171)
Medal record
Olympic Games
Gold medal – first place	2016 Rio de Janeiro	Team
World Championship
Gold medal – first place	2009 China
European Championship
Silver medal – second place	2018 France
Bronze medal – third place	2008 Macedonia
- Updated on 17 October 2024

Marina Vladimirovna Sudakova (Russian: Марина Владимировна Судакова; born 17 February 1989), née Yartseva, is a Russian former handball player for the Russian national team.

She is a World Champion in 2009 and an Olympic champion in 2016. She is a student of the Rostov Institute of the Russian State Trade-Economic University.

== Career ==
Sudakova started playing handball at her school in Volgograd. Her first professional club was Rostov-Don, where she first played for the 2nd team and later joined the first team. With Rostov she won the 2007, 2008, 2012 and 2015 Russian championship and the 2015 Russian cup.

In the 2016-17 season she played for HC Kuban Krasnodar. She then returned to Rostov-Don..

Back at Rostov-Don she won the 2018, 2019 and 2020 Russian championship. In 2020 she joined CSKA Moscow. Here she won the 2021 Russian championship and the 2022 Russian cup.

In the 2022-23 season she joined Romanian side CSM București, where she played for a single season and won both the Romanian championship and cup. She then returned to Russia and joined Dinamo Volgograd. After the 2023-24 season she retired.

== National team ==
Sudakova has played more than 100 games for the Russian national team. At the 2009 World Championship she won gold medals with the Russian team. At the 2008 European Championship she won bronze medals.

At the 2016 Olympics she won gold medals with the Russian team. At the 2018 European Championship she won silver medals with the Russian team. At the 2019 World Championship, she was not part of the final squad for Russia, but she was part of the extended team.
