= 2014–15 Golden League =

2014-15 Golden League
Tournament details
- Teams: 3

Final positions
- Champions: Norway (1st title)
- Runner-up: France
- Third place: Denmark

Tournament statistics
- Matches played: 18
- Goals scored: 867 (48.17 per match)

The 2014–15 Golden League was the 3rd edition of the Golden League, 2nd in the women's gender, a friendly handball tournament organised by Denmark, France and Norway held in a series of three rounds of round robin tournaments being the first in Denmark, the second in Norway and the third in France.

== First round ==
The first round was held in Denmark between 09 and 12 October 2014 in the cities of Holstebro, Esbjerg and Aarhus, the nation invited to play was Brazil

Team	Pld	W	D	L	GF	GA	GD	Pts
Denmark	3	2	0	1	73	68	+5	4
Norway	3	2	0	1	76	68	+8	4
France	3	1	1	1	63	68	-5	3
Brazil	3	0	1	2	77	85	–8	1

October 9	Brazil	27 – 31	Norway	Holstebro
October 9		(16–13)		Holstebro

October 9	Denmark	19 – 22	France	Holstebro
October 9		(10–9)		Holstebro

October 11	France	15 – 23	Norway	Esbjerg
October 11		(9–14)		Esbjerg

October 11	Denmark	28 – 24	Brazil	Esbjerg
October 11		(15–9)		Esbjerg

October 12	France	26 – 26	Brazil	Aarhus
October 12		(12–12)		Aarhus

October 12	Denmark	26 – 22	Norway	Aarhus
October 12		(12–13)		Aarhus

== Second round ==
The Second round was held in Norway between 27 and 30 November 2014 in the cities of Larvik and Oslo, the nation invited to play was Serbia

Team	Pld	W	D	L	GF	GA	GD	Pts
Denmark	3	3	0	0	82	64	+18	6
Norway	3	2	0	1	72	62	+10	4
France	3	1	0	2	65	65	0	2
Serbia	3	0	0	3	56	84	–28	0

November 27	Serbia	18 – 22	France	Larvik
November 27		(8–13)		Larvik

November 27	Norway	21 – 24	Denmark	Larvik
November 27		(8–14)		Larvik

November 28	Denmark	32 – 20	Serbia	Larvik
November 28		(18–13)		Larvik

November 28	Norway	21 – 20	France	Larvik
November 28		(11–14)		Larvik

November 30	Norway	30 – 18	Serbia	Oslo
November 30		(16–10)		Oslo

November 30	France	23 – 26	Denmark	Oslo
November 30		(13–12)		Oslo

== Third round ==
The third round was held in France between 19 and 22 March 2015 in the cities of Dijon and Besançon, the nation invited to play was Poland

Team	Pld	W	D	L	GF	GA	GD	Pts
France	3	3	0	0	78	66	+12	6
Denmark	3	1	0	2	76	77	-1	2
Poland	3	1	0	2	68	82	-14	2
Norway	3	1	0	2	81	78	+3	2

March 19	Norway	26 – 27	Poland	Dijon
March 19		(11–12)		Dijon

March 19	France	24 – 23	Denmark	Dijon
March 19		(14–15)		Dijon

March 21	Norway	32 – 23	Denmark	Besançon
March 21		(15–11)		Besançon

March 21	France	23 – 20	Poland	Besançon
March 21		(13–10)		Besançon

March 22	Denmark	31 – 20	Poland	Besançon
March 22		(12–10)		Besançon

March 22	France	28 – 23	Norway	Besançon
March 22		(13–12)		Besançon

== Final standings ==
For the final standings are counted only the matches in between the three host countries

Pos	Team	Pld	W	D	L	GF	GA	GD	Pts
1	Norway	6	3	0	3	142	136	+6	6
2	France	6	3	0	3	132	135	-3	6
3	Denmark	6	3	0	3	141	144	-3	6
