= Victoriya Kalinina =

Russian handball player (born 1988)

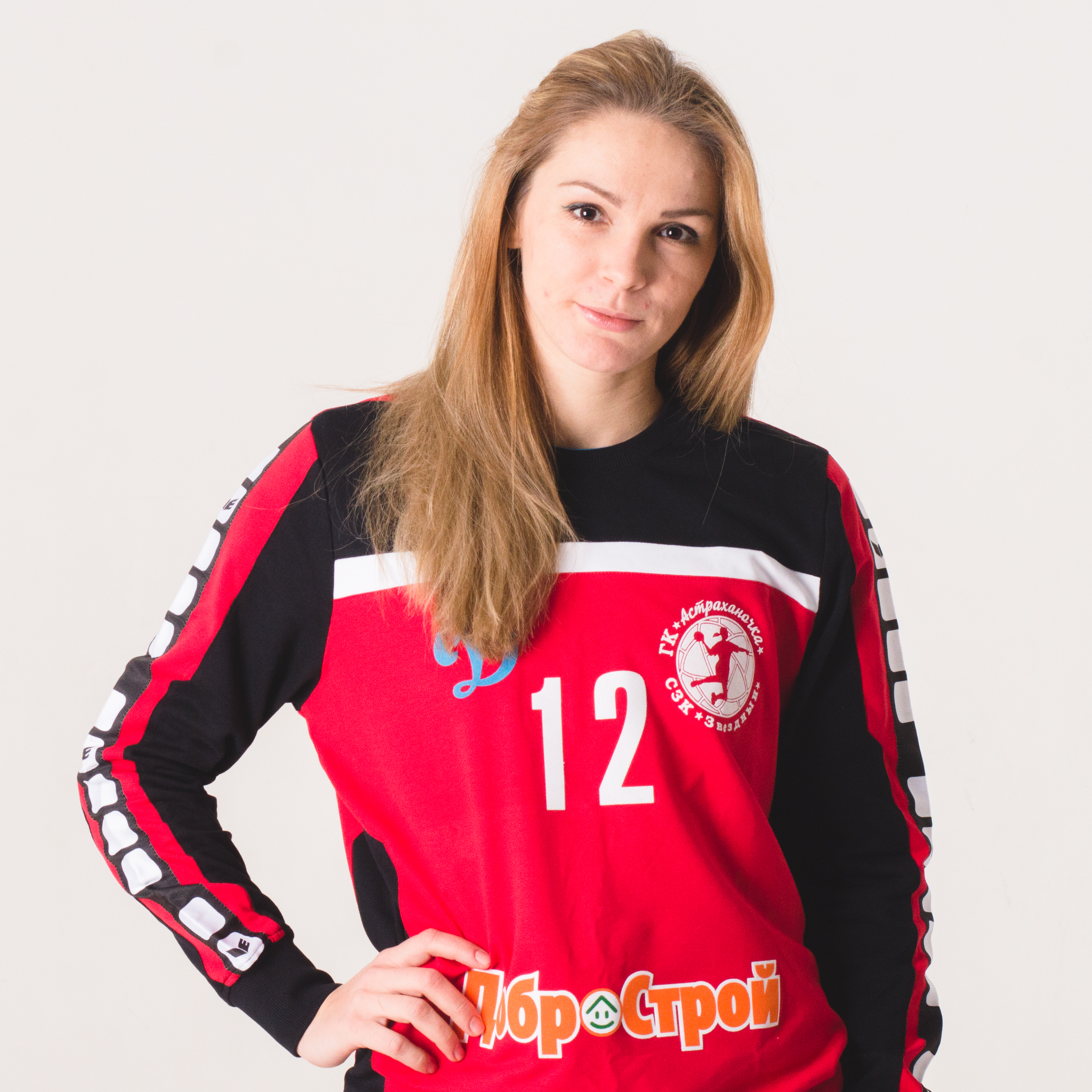
- Kalinina in 2016

Personal information
- Full name: Victoriya Viktorovna Kalinina
- Nationality: Russian
- Born: 8 December 1988 (age 37) Maykop, Russia
- Height: 1.82 m (6 ft 0 in)

Sport
- Sport: Handball
- Position: Goalkeeper
- Current club: Rostov-Don
- Number: 28

Senior clubs
- Years: Team
- -2009: GK 53 Moscow
- 2009-2013: Zvezda Zvenigorod
- 2013-2015: HC Kuban Krasnodar
- 2015-2016: HC Astrakhanochka
- 2016-2020: HC Kuban Krasnodar
- 2020-2023: Rostov-Don
National team
Years	Team	Apps	(Gls)
2015–2023	Russia	101	(1)
Medal record
Representing ROC
Olympic Games
Silver medal – second place	2020 Tokyo	Team
Representing Russia
Olympic Games
Gold medal – first place	2016 Rio de Janeiro	Team
World Championship
Bronze medal – third place	2019 Japan	Team

Victoriya Viktorovna Kalinina (Russian: Виктория Викторовна Калинина, IPA: [vʲɪˈktorʲɪjə ˈvʲiktərəvnə kɐˈlʲinʲɪnə]; born 8 December 1988) is a Russian handball player for Rostov-Don and the Russian national handball team. In 2016 she was part of the Russian team that won gold medals at the 2016 Olympics.

== Career ==
Kalinina played until 2009 for GK 53 Moscow. She then joined Zvezda Zvenigorod, where she won the 2010 and 2011 Russian Cup. In 2013 she joined HC Kuban Krasnodar. In February 2015 she joined HC Astrakhanochka. Here she won the 2016 Russian championship. After the 2015-16 season she returned HC Kuban Krasnodar. In the 2018-19 season she took a break from handball due to pregnancy leave.

Between 2020 and 2023 she played for Rostov-Don. Here she won the 2022 Russian championship.

== National team ==
At the 2016 Olympics Kalinina won gold medals with the Russian national team. At the 2019 World Championship she won bronze medals, beating Norway in the third place play-off.

At the 2020 Olympics she won silver medals, losing to France in the final 25-30. Kalinina had over the course of the tournament a save percentage of 24%.
