= Vladlena Bobrovnikova =

Russian handball player (born 1987)

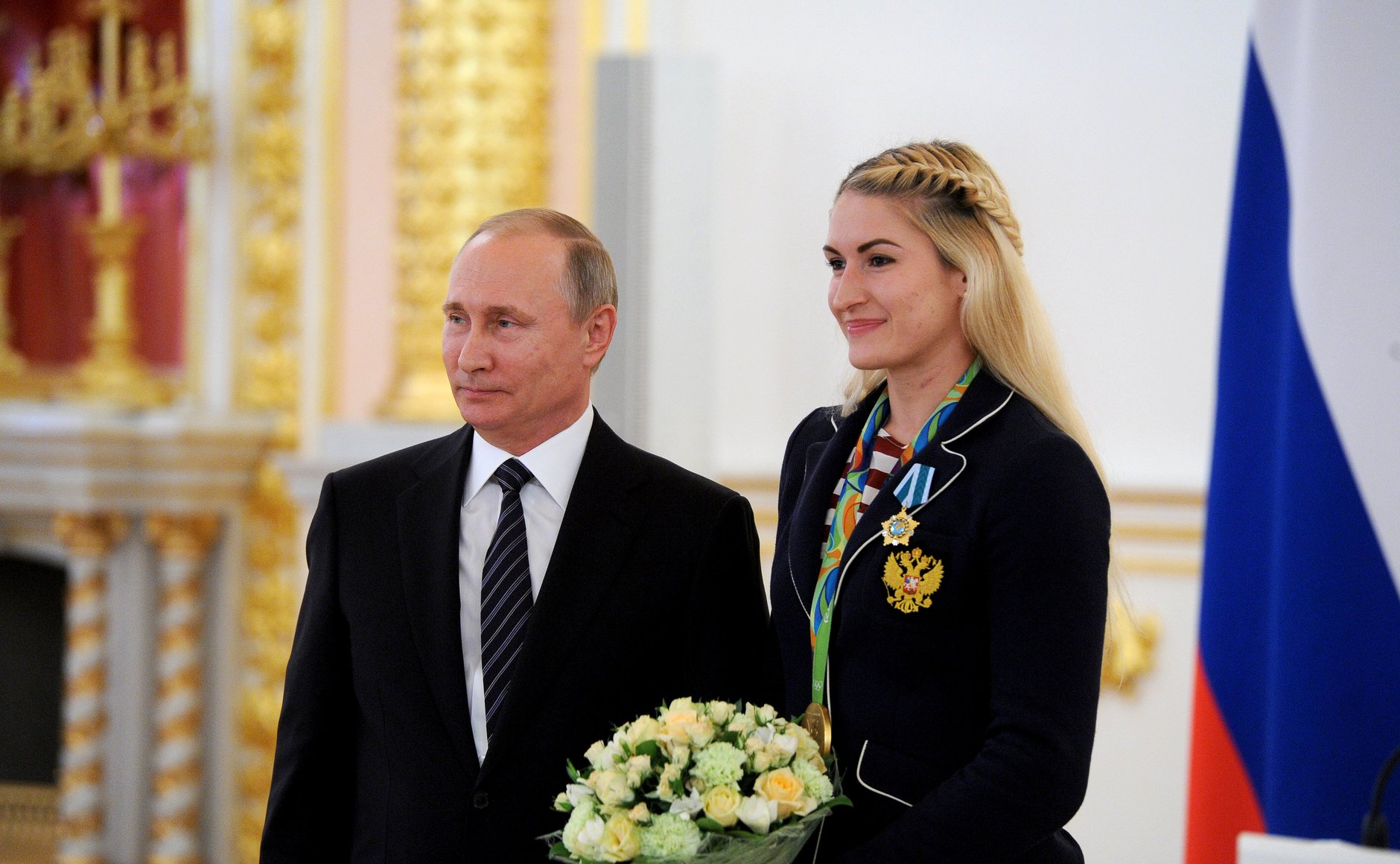
- Bobrovnikova with Vladimir Putin in 2016

Personal information
- Full name: Vladlena Eduardovna Bobrovnikova
- Nationality: Russian
- Born: 24 October 1987 (age 38) Krasnodar, Russia
- Height: 1.80 m (5 ft 11 in)

Sport
- Sport: Handball
- Position: Left back
- Current club: Rostov-Don
- Number: 17

Senior clubs
- Years: Team
- 2004–2009: HC Kuban Krasnodar
- 2009–2010: ŽRK Kikinda
- 2010–2011: HC Sassari
- 2011–2012: HF Teramo
- 2012–: Rostov-Don
National team
Years	Team	Apps	(Gls)
2014–	Russia	78	(202)
Medal record
Representing ROC
Olympic Games
Silver medal – second place	2020 Tokyo	Team
Representing Russia
Olympic Games
Gold medal – first place	2016 Rio de Janeiro	Team
World Championship
Bronze medal – third place	2019 Japan	Team

Vladlena Eduardovna Bobrovnikova (Russian: Владлена Эдуардовна Бобровникова, IPA: [vlɐˈdlʲenə ɪdʊˈardəvnə bɐˈbrovnʲɪkəvə]; born 24 October 1987) is a Russian handball player for Rostov-Don and the Russian national team. She is a 2016 Olympic gold medalist and a 2020 silver medalist.

== Individual awards ==
- All-Star Left Back of the European Championship: 2020
