= Véronique Pecqueux-Rolland =

French handball player (born 1972)

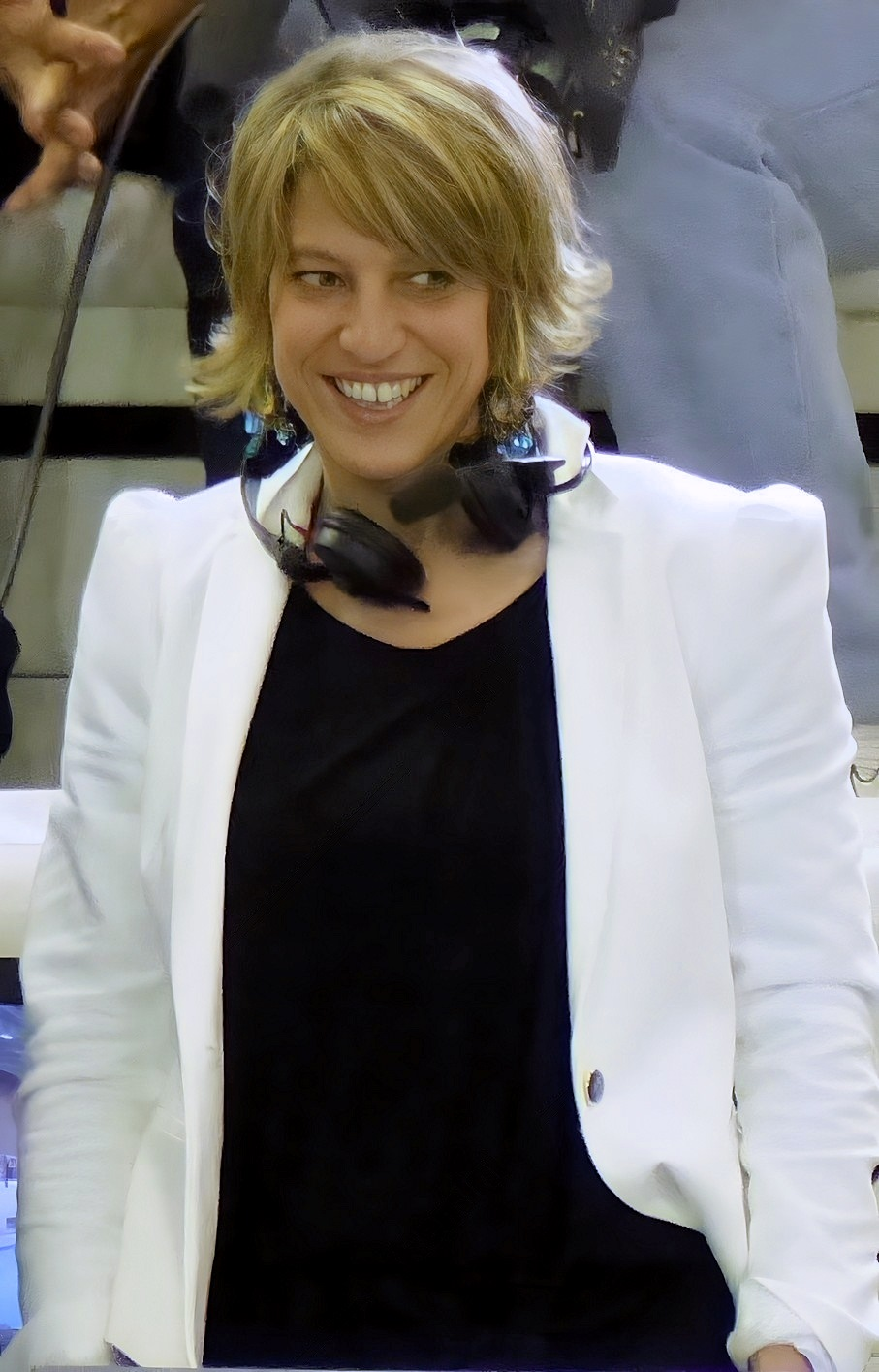
- Véronique Pecqueux-Rolland in 2014

Personal information
- Nationality: French
- Born: 9 October 1972 (age 54) Voiron, France
- Height: 1.72 m (5 ft 8 in)

Sport
- Sport: Handball
- Position: Pivot
- Current club: Retired
- Number: –

Senior clubs
- Years: Team
- 1992–1996: CSL Dijon
- 1996–1999: ES Besançon
- 1999–2002: Cercle Dijon Bourgogne
- 2002–2006: ES Besançon
- 2006–2009: Cercle Dijon Bourgogne
National team
Years	Team	Apps	(Gls)
1993–2008	France	302	(898)
Medal record
World Championship
Gold medal – first place	2003 Croatia	Team
Silver medal – second place	1999 Denmark/Norway	Team
European Championship
Bronze medal – third place	2002 Denmark	Team
Bronze medal – third place	2006 Sweden	Team
- Updated on 14 June 2009

Véronique Pecqueux-Rolland (born 9 October 1972) is a French former handballer who played for the French national team. She received a gold medal at the 2003 World Championship and a silver medal at the 1999 World Championship. She won the Cup Winners' Cup with ES Besançon in 2003.

Pecqueux-Rolland made her debut with the national team on 12 March 1993. She stopped playing for France after the 2008 Summer Olympics, having scored 898 goals in 302 matches. She retired from handball in April 2009.

== Results ==
Club

- French Championship: Winner in 1998 and 2003; Runner-up in 2005
- French Cup: Winner in 2003 and 2005; Finalist in 2006 and 2007
- French League Cup: Winner in 2003 and 2004; Finalist in 2006 and 2007
- Cup Winners' Cup: Winner in 2003

National team

- World Championship: Gold in 2003; Silver in 1999
- European Championship: Bronze in 2002 and 2006

== Awards ==
- Pivot of the All-Star Team at the 2000 and 2004 Summer Olympics.
