= Marie Prouvensier =

French handball player (born 1994)

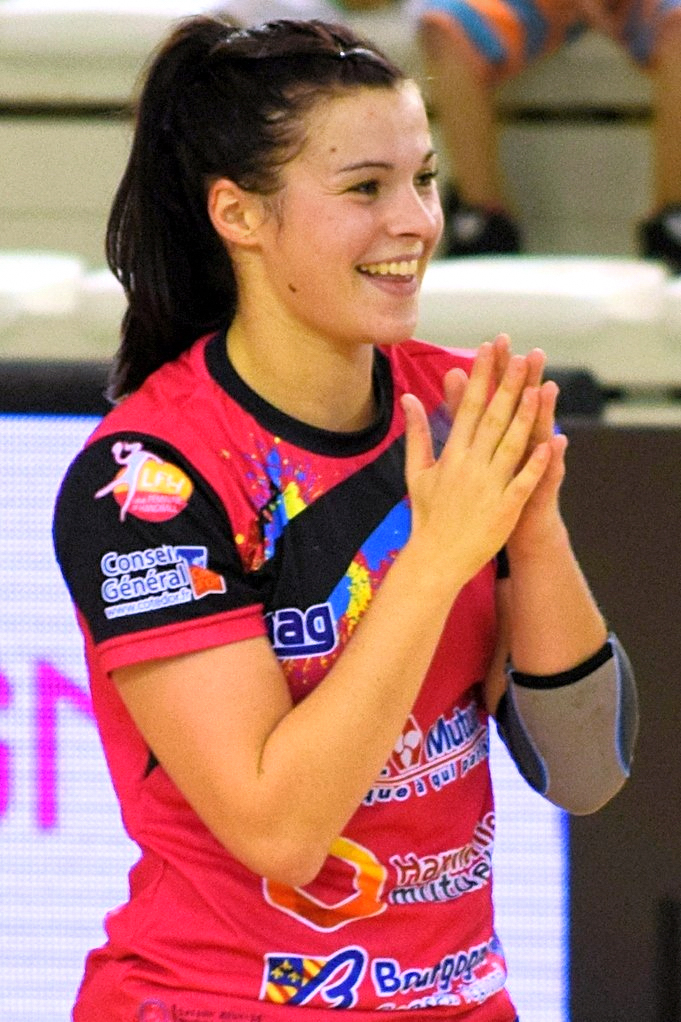

Personal information
- Nationality: French
- Born: 9 February 1994 (age 32) Dijon, France
- Height: 1.65 m (5 ft 5 in)

Sport
- Sport: Handball
- Position: Right wing
- Current club: OGC Nice Côte d'Azur Handball
- Number: 17

Senior clubs
- Years: Team
- 2010-2016: Cercle Dijon Bourgogne Handball
- 2016-2019: Brest Bretagne Handball
- 2019-: OGC Nice Côte d'Azur Handball
National team
Years	Team	Apps	(Gls)
2014-	France	36	(36)
- Updated on 17 August 2023

Marie Prouvensier (born 9 February 1994) is a French handball player for OGC Nice Côte d'Azur Handball and the French national team.

== Individual awards ==
- French Championship Best Right Wing: 2015
