= Laura Glauser =

French handball player (born 1993)

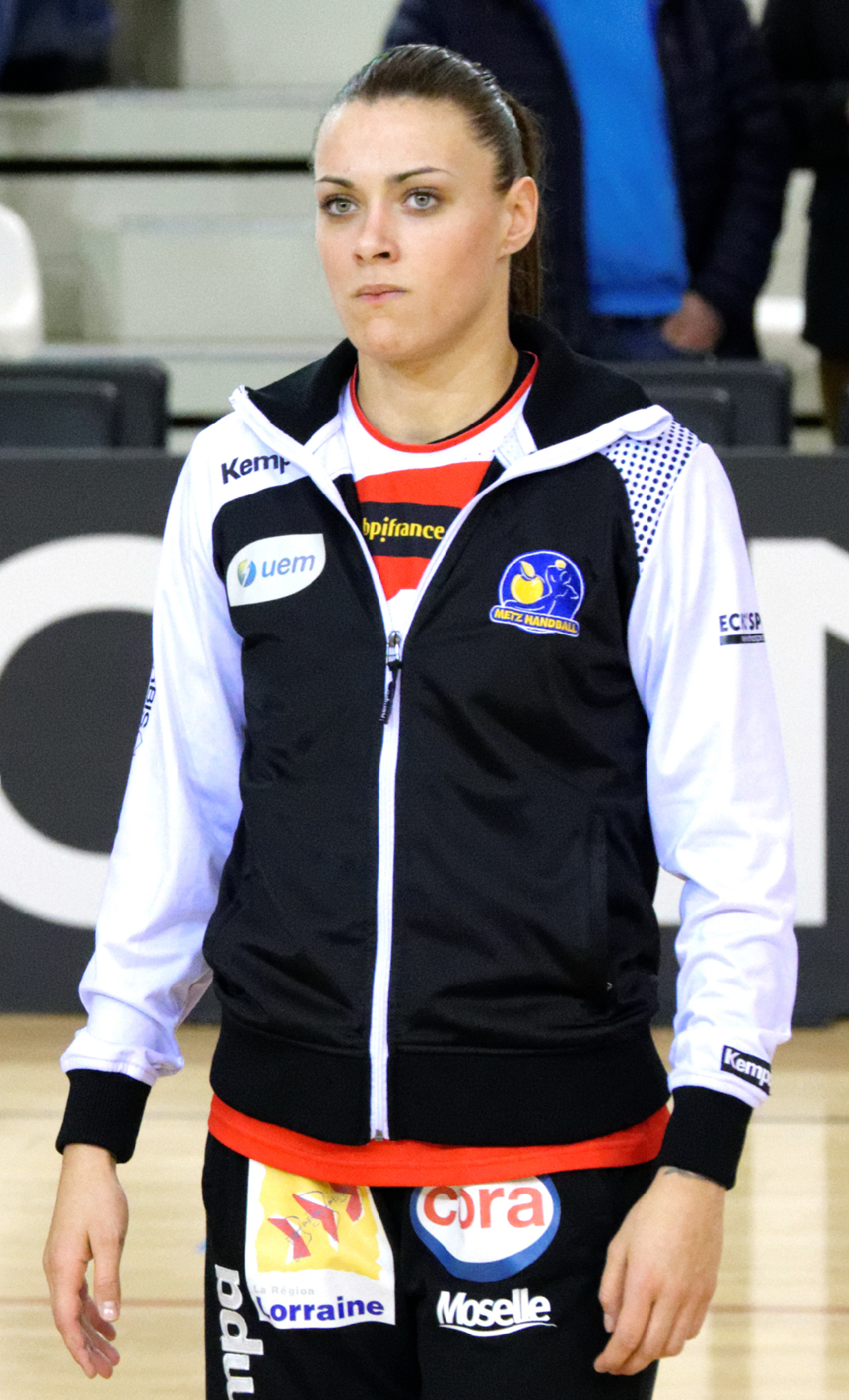
- Glauser in 2016

Personal information
- Nationality: French
- Born: 20 August 1993 (age 33) Besançon, France
- Height: 1.80 m (5 ft 11 in)

Sport
- Sport: Handball
- Position: Goalkeeper
- Current club: CS Rapid București
- Number: 1

Youth career
- Years: Team
- 2005–2007: HBC Val de Saône

Senior clubs
- Years: Team
- 2007–2010: ES Besançon Féminin
- 2010–2020: Metz Handball
- 2020–2022: Győri ETO KC
- 2022–2024: CSM București
- 2024–2026: Ferencvárosi TC
- 2026-: CS Rapid București
National team
| Years | Team | Apps | (Gls) |
| 2012– | France | 134 | (2) |
Medal record
Olympic Games
| Silver medal – second place | 2016 Rio de Janeiro | Team |
| Silver medal – second place | 2024 Paris | Team |
World Championship
| Gold medal – first place | 2023 Denmark/Norway/Sweden |
| Silver medal – second place | 2021 Spain |
European Championship
| Gold medal – first place | 2018 France |
| Silver medal – second place | 2020 Denmark |
| Bronze medal – third place | 2016 Sweden |
- Updated on 12 November 2024

Laura Glauser (born 20 August 1993) is a French handballer for CS Rapid București and the French national team.

== Career ==
Glauser started at HBC Val de Saône. In 2007 she joined ES Besançon Féminin Three years later she joined Metz Handball. Here she won the French championship 6 times between 2011 and 2019, the 2011 and 2014 French League Cup and the 2013, 2015, 2017 and 2019 French Cup. In 2017 she took a break from handball due to pregnancy.

In 2020 she joined Hungarian team Győri ETO KC. Here she won the 2021 Hungarian Cup and in 2022 the Hungarian championship.

In 2022 she joined Romanian CSM București to replace Tess Wester, who had just moved to Borussia Dortmund Handball. Here she won the 2023 and 2024 Romanian championship and the 2023 and 2024 Romanian cup.

In 2024 she returned to Hungary to join Ferencvárosi TC, where she stayed for two years before moving back to Romania to represent the rival Bucharest club, CS Rapid București.

== National team ==
Glauser debuted for the French national team on October 5, 2012 against Norway.

With the French national team Glauser participated in the 2016 Olympics, where she won a silver medal. Later the same year she won bronze medals at the 2016 European Championship.

Two years later she won the 2018 European Championship.

At the 2020 European Championship she won silvermedals, although she did only play a single match against Russia in the main round. She was included in the team to replace Cléopâtre Darleux, but when she was ready again, Glauser had to leave the tournament.

A year later she won silver medals at the 2021 World Championship, losing the final to Norway.

In 2023 she won the 2023 World Championship. She was included in the tournament all star team.

At the 2024 Olympics she won silver medals with the French team, and she was included in the tournament all star team.

She missed the 2025 World Championship due to injury.

== Achievements ==
- IHF Junior World Championship:
  - Silver Medalist: 2012
- IHF Youth World Championship:
  - Fourth Place: 2010
- French Championship:
  - Winner: 2011, 2013, 2014, 2016, 2017, 2018
- EHF Cup:
  - Finalist: 2013
- EHF Cup Winners' Cup:
  - Semifinalist: 2011
  - Winner: 2011, 2013, 2014
- French Cup:
  - Winner: 2013, 2015
- French League Cup:
  - Winner: 2011, 2014
- Hungarian Championship
  - Winner: 2022
- Hungarian Cup:
  - Winner: 2021, 2025

== Individual awards ==
- All-Star goalkeeper of the Summer Olympics: 2024
- All-Star goalkeeper of the World Championship: 2023
- French Championship Best Goalkeeper: 2016, 2017
- All-Star Goalkeeper of the EHF Champions League: 2022
- Best goalkeeper of the IHF Junior World Championship: 2012
- Best Young Goalkeeper at the 2015 World Championships
