= Estelle Nze Minko =

French handball player (born 1991)

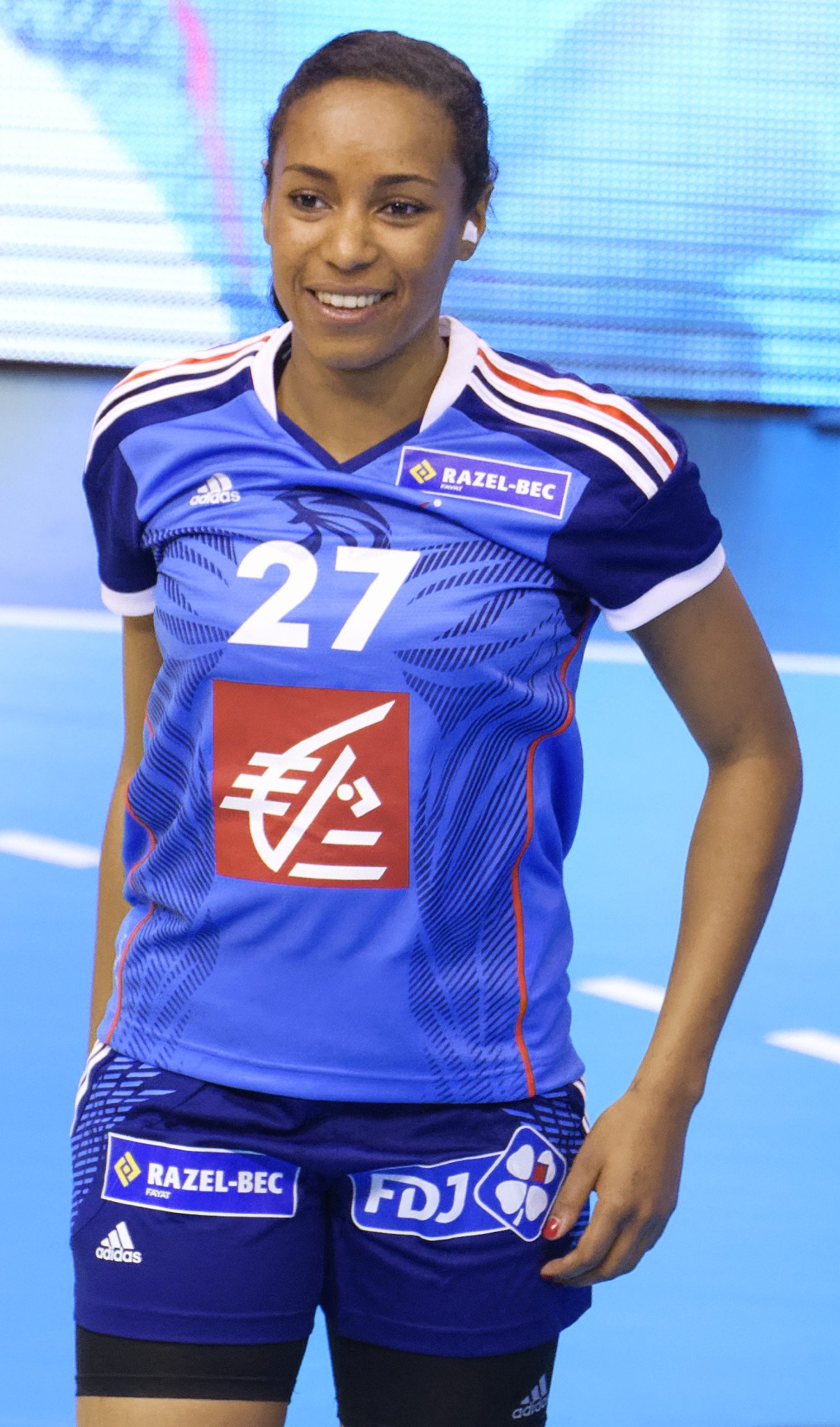
- Nze Minko in 2015

Personal information
- Nationality: French
- Born: 11 August 1991 (age 35) Saint-Sébastien-sur-Loire, France
- Height: 1.71 m (5 ft 7 in)

Sport
- Sport: Handball
- Position: Left back
- Current club: Győri ETO KC
- Number: 27

Youth career
- Years: Team
- –: Saint-Julien-de-Concelles
- –: Nantes Handball

Senior clubs
- Years: Team
- 2009–2010: Toulouse Féminin Handball
- 2010–2012: Mios Biganos
- 2012–2013: Handball Cercle Nîmes
- 2013–2015: Nantes Handball
- 2015–2016: Fleury Loiret HB
- 2016–2019: Siófok KC
- 2019–: Győri ETO KC
National team
Years	Team	Apps	(Gls)
2013–	France	208	(513)
Medal record
Women's handball
Representing (France) France
Olympic Games
Gold medal – first place	2020 Tokyo	Team
Silver medal – second place	2024 Paris	Team
Silver medal – second place	2016 Rio de Janeiro	Team
World Championship
Gold medal – first place	2023 Denmark/Norway/Sweden
Gold medal – first place	2017 Germany
Silver medal – second place	2021 Spain
European Championship
Gold medal – first place	2018 France
Silver medal – second place	2020 Denmark
Bronze medal – third place	2016 Sweden
- Updated on 15 December 2024

Estelle Nze Minko (born 11 August 1991) is a French professional handball player for Győri ETO KC and the French national team. She is an Olympic champion from 2021, world champion from 2017 and 2023, and a European champion from 2018.

== Career ==
Nze Minko started playing handball at the age of 12 at Saint-Julien-de-Concelles. In 2009 she joined Toulouse Féminin Handball where she played for a season before joining Mios Biganos. With Mios-Biganos, she won the 2011 EHF Challenge Cup.

In 2012, she joined Handball Cercle Nîmes. A year later she returned to Nantes Handball. In 2015, she joined Fleury Loiret HB for a single season. Here she won the French league cup.

In 2016, she joined Hungarian side Siófok KC. Here she won the 2019 EHF Cup. The following summer she joined league rivals Győri ETO KC. Here she won the 2021 Hungarian Cup, the 2022 and 2023 Hungarian championship, and the 2024 EHF Champions League.

=== National team ===
With the French youth team Nze Minko won gold medals at the 2007 U17 European Championship.

She debuted for the French national team on October 24th against Slovakia. Her first major international tournament was the 2014 European Championship.

A year later she was part of the French team at the 2015 World Championship. She scored 24 goals during the tournament.

In 2016, she played at both the 2016 Summer Olympics and the 2016 European Championship. At the Olympics she won silvermedals and at the European Championship she won bronze medals.

At the 2017 World Championship she won her first title with France. A year later she won the 2018 European Championship on home soil. This was the first time France won the tournament. She scored 38 goals during the tournament.

At the 2020 European Championship, she won silver medals with the French team, losing the final to Norway. Scoring 26 goals, she was included in the tournament all-star team.

At the 2020 Summer Olympics in Tokyo, she won Gold medals with the French team. Later the same year she won silver medals at the 2021 World Championship.

At the 2023 she won gold medals at a World Championship for a second time. She was included in the tournament all-star team.

At the 2024 Summer Olympics in Paris, she won silver medals with the French team and was once again included in the all-star team.

== Achievements ==
- EHF Champions League:
  - Winner: 2024, 2025
- EHF Cup:
  - Winner: 2019
- Hungarian Championship
  - Winner: 2022, 2023, 2025
- Hungarian Cup
  - Winner: 2021

== Individual awards ==
- All-Star left back of the Summer Olympics: 2024
- All-Star left back of the World Championship: 2023
- MVP of the European Championship: 2020
- EHF Excellence Awards: Left Back of the Season 2024/25
- All-Star Left Back of the Møbelringen Cup: 2018
- MVP of the EHF Cup Final: 2019
- Chevalier in the French Legion of Honour: 2021
- Chevalier of the French Ordre national du Mérite: 2016

== Personal life ==
Born in France, Nze Minko is of Gabonese descent. On 11 September 2025, Nze Minko announced her pregnancy. Her son, Liam was born on 14 March 2026.
