= France women's national handball team =

France

Information
- Nickname: Les Bleues (The Blues)
- Association: French Handball Federation
- Coach: Sébastien Gardillou
- Assistant coach: David Burguin
- Captain: Grâce Zaadi
- Most caps: Isabelle Wendling (338)
- Most goals: Véronique Pecqueux-Rolland (917)

Colours
1st	2nd

Results

Summer Olympics
- Appearances: 7 (First in 2000)
- Best result: (gold) 1st (2020)

World Championship
- Appearances: 17 (First in 1986)
- Best result: (gold) 1st (2003, 2017, 2023)

European Championship
- Appearances: 14 (First in 2000)
- Best result: (gold) 1st (2018)
- Last updated on 2025.

France women's national handball team
Medal record

Olympic Games
Gold medal – first place	2020 Tokyo	Team
Silver medal – second place	2016 Rio de Janeiro	Team
Silver medal – second place	2024 Paris	Team

World Championship
Gold medal – first place	2003 Croatia	
Gold medal – first place	2017 Germany	
Gold medal – first place	2023 Denmark/Norway/Sweden	
Silver medal – second place	1999 Denmark/Norway	
Silver medal – second place	2009 China	
Silver medal – second place	2011 Brazil	
Silver medal – second place	2021 Spain	
Bronze medal – third place	2025 Germany/Netherlands	

European Championship
Gold medal – first place	2018 France	
Silver medal – second place	2020 Denmark	
Bronze medal – third place	2002 Denmark	
Bronze medal – third place	2006 Sweden	
Bronze medal – third place	2016 Sweden	

The France women's national handball team is the national team of France. It is governed by the French Handball Federation and takes part in international handball competitions. The team is considered one of the strongest in the world, having won both World, Olympic and European gold.

== Honours ==
Competition	1st place, gold medalist(s)	2nd place, silver medalist(s)	3rd place, bronze medalist(s)	Total
Olympic Games	1	2	0	3
World Championship	3	4	1	8
European Championship	1	1	3	5
Total	5	7	4	16

== Results ==
=== Olympic Games ===
Games	Position	Pld	W	D	L	GF	GA	GD
(Canada) 1976 Montreal	did not qualify							
(Soviet Union) 1980 Moscow	did not qualify							
(United States) 1984 Los Angeles	did not qualify							
(South Korea) 1988 Seoul	did not qualify							
(Spain) 1992 Barcelona	did not qualify							
(United States) 1996 Atlanta	did not qualify							
(Australia) 2000 Sydney	6th	7	3	0	4	180	177	+3
(Greece) 2004 Athens	4th	7	3	0	4	179	182	−3
(China) 2008 Beijing	5th	8	4	0	4	219	217	+2
(United Kingdom) 2012 London	5th	6	4	1	1	147	126	+21
(Brazil) 2016 Rio de Janeiro	2nd place, silver medalist(s)	8	6	0	2	188	164	+24
(Japan) 2020 Tokyo	1st place, gold medalist(s)	8	5	1	2	230	209	+21
(France) 2024 Paris	2nd place, silver medalist(s)	8	7	0	1	237	204	+33
(United States) 2028 Los Angeles	TBD							
Total	6/12	52	32	2	18	1380	1280	+100

=== World Championship ===
Year	Position	Pld	W	D	L	GS	GA	+/–
(Socialist Federal Republic of Yugoslavia) 1957	did not qualify							
(Romania) 1962	did not qualify							
(West Germany) 1965	did not qualify							
(Netherlands) 1971	did not qualify							
(Socialist Federal Republic of Yugoslavia) 1973	did not qualify							
(Soviet Union) 1975	did not qualify							
(Czechoslovakia) 1978	did not qualify							
(Hungary) 1982	did not qualify							
(Netherlands) 1986	15th	6	1	0	5	89	121	−32
(South Korea) 1990	14th	6	2	0	4	114	137	−23
(Norway) 1993	did not qualify							
(Austria) (Hungary) 1995	did not qualify							
(Germany) 1997	10th	6	3	0	3	160	125	+35
(Denmark) (Norway) 1999	2nd	9	7	0	2	213	178	+35
(Italy) 2001	5th	9	7	0	2	246	207	+39
(Croatia) 2003	1st	10	9	0	1	282	224	+58
(Russia) 2005	12th	8	3	0	5	212	199	+13
(France) 2007	5th	10	7	0	3	287	251	+36
(China) 2009	2nd	10	7	0	3	258	219	+39
(Brazil) 2011	2nd	9	7	0	2	268	204	+64
(Serbia) 2013	6th	7	6	0	1	173	121	+52
(Denmark) 2015	7th	9	5	1	3	227	194	+33
(Germany) 2017	1st	9	7	1	1	236	189	+47
(Japan) 2019	13th	7	4	1	2	191	138	+53
(Spain) 2021	2nd	9	8	0	1	240	197	+43
(Denmark) (Norway) (Sweden) 2023	1st	9	9	0	0	290	228	+62
(Germany) (Netherlands) 2025	3rd	9	7	0	2	300	223	+77
(Hungary) 2027	TBD							
(Spain) 2029	TBD							
(Czech Republic) (Poland) 2031	TBD							
Total	17/28	142	99	3	40	3786	3155	+631

=== European Championship ===
Year	Position	Pld	W	D	L	GS	GA	+/–
(Germany) 1994	did not qualify							
(Denmark) 1996	did not qualify							
(Netherlands) 1998	did not qualify							
(Romania) 2000	5th	6	4	0	2	150	125	+25
(Denmark) 2002	3rd	8	5	0	3	189	191	−2
(Hungary) 2004	11th	6	1	0	5	153	177	−24
(Sweden) 2006	3rd	8	5	0	3	203	196	+7
(North Macedonia) 2008	14th	3	0	0	3	74	83	−9
(Denmark) (Norway) 2010	5th	7	5	0	2	168	153	+15
(Serbia) 2012	9th	6	3	0	3	140	131	+9
(Hungary) (Croatia) 2014	5th	7	5	1	1	168	150	+18
(Sweden) 2016	3rd	8	6	0	2	183	164	+19
(France) 2018	1st	8	6	1	1	217	181	+36
(Denmark) (Norway) 2020	2nd	8	6	1	1	209	179	+30
(Slovenia) (North Macedonia) (Montenegro) 2022	4th	8	6	0	2	222	177	+45
(Austria) (Hungary) (Switzerland) 2024	4th	9	7	0	2	255	211	+44
(Czech Republic) (Poland) (Romania) (Slovakia) (Turkey) 2026	Qualified							
(Denmark) (Norway) (Sweden) 2028	TBD							
(Belgium) (France) 2030	Qualified as co-host							
(Denmark) (Germany) (Poland) 2032	TBD							
Total	14/20	92	59	3	30	2331	2118	+213

=== Other tournaments ===
- 1987 Mediterranean Games – 2nd
- 1989 Carpathian Trophy – 3rd
- 1991 Mediterranean Games – 2nd
- 1993 Mediterranean Games – 2nd
- 1997 Mediterranean Games – Winner
- 2001 Mediterranean Games – Winner
- 2005 Mediterranean Games – 4th
- 2009 Mediterranean Games – Winner
- 2002 Møbelringen Cup – 3rd
- 2004 Møbelringen Cup – 2nd
- 2006 Møbelringen Cup – 3rd
- 2012 Møbelringen Cup – Winner
- 2014 Møbelringen Cup – 3rd
- 2016 Møbelringen Cup – 4th
- 2018 Møbelringen Cup – 2nd
- GF World Cup '07 – 2nd
- GF World Cup '08 – 3rd
- GF World Cup '10 – 3rd
- GF World Cup '11 – 3rd
- 2014–15 Golden League – 2nd

== Team ==
=== Current squad ===
The squad chosen for preparations to the 2026 European Women's Handball Championship, including two matches against Germany in November 2026.

Head coach: Sébastien Gardillou

Caps and goals as of 6 November 2026.

No.	Pos.	Name	Date of birth (age)	Height	App.	Goals	Club
1	GK	Laura Glauser	20 August 1993 (age 33)	1.78 m	151	3	(Romania) CS Rapid București
2	CB	Méline Nocandy	25 February 1998 (age 28)	1.75 m	96	183	(France) Brest Bretagne Handball
3	RW	Alicia Toublanc-Nicolas	3 May 1996 (age 30)	1.69 m	85	234	(Hungary) Debreceni VSC
5	LB	Clarisse Mairot	27 January 2001 (age 25)	1.70 m	28	47	(France) Brest Bretagne Handball
6	LW	Chloé Valentini	19 April 1995 (age 31)	1.65 m	113	338	(France) Metz Handball
7	P	Sarah Bouktit	27 August 2002 (age 24)	1.83 m	63	164	(Hungary) Győri ETO KC
10	CB	Grâce Zaadi (c)	7 July 1993 (age 33)	1.71 m	210	419	(Romania) SCM Râmnicu Vâlcea
14	LW	Nina Dury	16 January 2004 (age 22)	1.74 m	22	52	(France) JDA Dijon Handball
18	P	Lilou Pintat	9 November 2004 (age 22)	1.79 m	13	9	(France) Metz Handball
20	RB	Laura Schneider	13 December 1994 (age 31)	1.71 m	158	306	(France) Metz Handball
22	CB	Tamara Horacek	5 November 1995 (age 31)	1.78 m	130	275	(France) Brest Bretagne Handball
23	LB	Déborah Lassource	29 September 1999 (age 27)	1.72 m	46	41	(France) JDA Dijon Handball
27	LB	Estelle Nze Minko	11 August 1991 (age 35)	1.78 m	208	513	(Hungary) Győri ETO KC
28	RW	Lucie Granier	11 June 1999 (age 27)	1.67 m	85	205	(France) Metz Handball
29	P	Oriane Ondono	14 April 1996 (age 30)	1.80 m	65	87	(France) Brest Bretagne Handball
34	CB	Léna Grandveau	21 January 2003 (age 23)	1.70 m	66	141	(France) Metz Handball
43	LB	Prunelle Kingue	19 March 2006 (age 20)	1.79 m	0	0	(France) ESBF Besançon
53	GK	Léa Fargues	7 June 1998 (age 28)	1.75 m	3	0	(France) SATH
89	RW	Manon Errard	9 February 2005 (age 21)	1.78 m	5	18	(France) Metz Handball
99	GK	Hatadou Sako	21 October 1995 (age 31)	1.74 m	56	0	(Hungary) Győri ETO KC

=== Extended squad / recent call-ups ===
No.	Pos.	Name	Date of birth (age)	Height	App.	Goals	Club
4	LB	Claire Vautier	5 September 1999 (age 27)	1.79 m	7	7	(France) JDA Dijon Handball
9	CB	Lylou Borg	31 May 2005 (age 21)	1.75 m	11	21	(France) Metz Handball
11	RW	Maureen Gayet	14 May 2002 (age 24)	1.75 m	4	8	(France) JDA Dijon Handball
12	GK	Floriane André	30 May 2000 (age 26)	1.86 m	37	2	(France) Brest Bretagne Handball
15	RB	Marie-Hélène Sajka	13 September 1997 (age 29)	1.85 m	18	22	(France) OGC Nice Côte d'Azur Handball
17	LW	Kiara Tshimanga	23 November 2002 (age 23)	1.64 m	3	6	(France) Brest Bretagne Handball
21	LB	Orlane Kanor	16 June 1997 (age 29)	1.78 m	126	269	(Hungary) Ferencvárosi TC
25	RB	Emma Jacques	29 November 2001 (age 24)	1.90 m	18	18	(Hungary) Esztergomi KC
26	P	Pauletta Foppa	22 December 2000 (age 25)	1.77 m	122	306	(France) Brest Bretagne Handball
30	GK	Camille Depuiset	19 October 1998 (age 28)	1.79 m	16	1	(France) Brest Bretagne Handball
45	RW	Sabrina Zazaï-Özil	19 October 1994 (age 32)	1.70 m	2	3	(France) ESBF Besançon
48	P	Hélèna Mathon	21 August 2003 (age 23)	1.77 m	2	6	(France) Handball Plan-de-Cuques
49	RB	Eva Mbata	9 August 2004 (age 22)	1.75 m	1	0	(France) Saint-Amand Handball
50	RB	Lucie Modenel	5 February 2002 (age 24)	1.70 m	2	3	(France) Chambray Touraine Handball
69	LB	Coura Kanouté	17 July 2003 (age 23)	1.79 m	4	4	(France) Paris 92
77	P	Emmanuelle Thobor	8 August 2002 (age 24)	1.85 m	2	4	(France) Paris 92
78	LB	Enola Borg	31 May 2005 (age 21)	1.79 m	6	5	(France) Brest Bretagne Handball
86	LW	Marine Dupuis	18 April 1992 (age 34)	1.68 m	9	17	(France) OGC Nice Côte d'Azur Handball
96	LB	Fatou Karamoko	14 December 2005 (age 20)	1.76 m	11	2	(France) Stella Saint-Maur Handball
98	LW	Suzanne Wajoka	2 January 2001 (age 25)	1.71 m	18	63	(France) Metz Handball
	RB	Lina Colinot	8 February 2005 (age 21)	1.74 m	0	0	(France) SATH

=== Coaching staff ===
Role	Name	Start year
Head coach	(France) Sébastien Gardillou	2024
Assistant coach	(France) David Burgin	2024
Goalkeeping coach	(France) Amandine Leynaud	2022

=== Notable players ===
Several French players have seen their individual performance recognized at international tournaments.

MVP

- Valérie Nicolas (goalkeeper), 2003 World Championship
- Estelle Nze Minko (left back), 2020 European Championship

All-Star Team

- Nodjialem Myaro (centre back), 1999 World Championship
- Stéphanie Cano (right wing), 2002 European Championship
- Valérie Nicolas (goalkeeper), 2003 World Championship, 2007 World Championship
- Isabelle Wendling (line player), 2003 World Championship
- Véronique Pecqueux-Rolland (centre back), 2004 Summer Olympics
- Mariama Signaté (left back), 2009 World Championship
- Allison Pineau (centre back), 2009 World Championship, 2011 World Championship, 2016 Summer Olympics
- Alexandra Lacrabère (right back), 2016 Summer Olympics
- Béatrice Edwige (defender), 2016 European Championship
- Grâce Zaadi (centre back), 2017 World Championship, 2020 Summer Olympics, 2021 World Championship
- Siraba Dembélé (left wing), 2017 World Championship
- Amandine Leynaud (goalkeeper), 2018 European Championship
- Laura Flippes (right wing), 2020 Summer Olympics
- Pauletta Foppa (line player), 2020 Summer Olympics, 2021 World Championship, 2022 European Championship, 2024 European Championship (best defender)
- Coralie Lassource (left wing), 2021 World Championship
- Cléopatre Darleux (goalkeeper), 2022 European Championship
- Laura Glauser (goalkeeper), 2023 World Championship, 2024 Summer Olympics
- Chloé Valentini (left wing), 2023 World Championship
- Estelle Nze Minko (left back), 2023 World Championship, 2024 Summer Olympics
- Alicia Toublanc (right wing), 2024 Summer Olympics
- Sarah Bouktit (line player), 2025 World Championship

==== Individual all-time records ====
Still active players are highlighted

==== Most matches played ====
Total number of matches played in official competitions only.

#	Player	Matches	Goals	Period
1	Isabelle Wendling	338	543	1993–2008
2	Véronique Pecqueux-Rolland	301	917	1993–2008
3	Siraba Dembélé	291	848	2006–2021
4	Allison Pineau	273	696	2007–2021
5	Camille Ayglon	270	550	2007–2019
6	Alexandra Lacrabère	256	833	2006–2021
7	Amandine Leynaud	254	3	2005–2021
8	Raphaëlle Tervel	249	372	1998–2012
9	Valérie Nicolas	244	0	1995–2008
10	Stéphanie Cano	231	462	1993–2008

Last updated: 28 November 2024

==== Most goals scored ====
Total number of goals scored in official matches only.

#	Player	Goals	Matches	Average
1	Véronique Pecqueux-Rolland	917	301	3.04
2	Siraba Dembélé	848	291	2.91
3	Alexandra Lacrabère	833	256	3.25
4	Leila Lejeune	763	183	4.17
5	Allison Pineau	696	273	2.55
6	Paule Baudouin	605	197	3.07
7	Sophie Herbrecht	569	193	2.95
8	Camille Ayglon	550	270	2.04
9	Isabelle Wendling	543	338	1.60
10	Estelle Nze Minko	513	208	2.46

Last updated: 15 December 2024

=== Head coach history ===
Period	Coach
1991–1997	(France) Carole Martin
1998–2013; 2016–2024	(France) Olivier Krumbholz
2013–2016	(France) Alain Portes
2024–present	(France) Sébastien Gardillou
