= EHF Players of the Month =

- Sport: Handball
- Competition: European Handball
- Awarded for: Best Performance in an EHF competition

History
- First award: January 2016
- Most wins: Men's: Sander Sagosen (NOR) & Andy Schmid (SUI) (3); Women's: Anna Vyakhireva (RUS) (5)

EHF Players of the Month are monthly handball awards which recognises the best male and female players from European Handball Federation competitions. The recipients are chosen by a panel of journalists assembled by the EHF Media department, and are announced on the first Thursday of the following month.

The awards were launched in January 2016 and are given on a monthly basis, except for of July and August when the months are combined to allow both male and female younger age category competitions to take place.

Any player who has taken part in an EHF competition, including the EHF Champions League, EHF Cup, EHF Challenge Cup, EHF EURO, European Beach Handball Championship (disambiguation) and all European Younger Age Category events, is eligible to be nominated for the award.

Out of all the monthly winners are picked the EHF Players of the Year.

== Male winners ==
As of 6 March 2020

Month	Player	Club	Also nominated
January 2016	Andreas Wolff (GER)	(Germany) HSG Wetzlar	Sander Sagosen (NOR, Aalborg Handbold), Julen Aguinagalde (ESP, Vive Tauron Kielce), Antonio García Robledo (ESP, MOL-Pick Szeged), Johan Jakobsson (SWE, SG Flensburg-Handewitt)
February 2016	Rasmus Lauge Schmidt (DEN)	(Germany) SG Flensburg-Handewitt	Mikkel Hansen (DEN, Paris Saint-Germain Handball), Dean Bombač (SLO, MOL-Pick Szeged), Kiril Lazarov (MKD, FC Barcelona Lassa), Mattias Andersson (SWE, SG Flensburg-Handewitt)
March 2016	Dean Bombač (SLO)	(Hungary) MOL-Pick Szeged	Mads Mensah Larsen (DEN, Rhein-Neckar Löwen), Alem Toskić (SRB, HC Vardar), Rodrigo Corrales (ESP, Wisla Plock), Arpad Sterbik (ESP, HC Vardar)
April 2016	Dominik Klein (GER)	(Germany) THW Kiel	Niklas Landin (Denmark, THW Kiel), Holger Glandorf (GER, SG Flensburg-Handewitt), Momir Ilić (SRB, MVM Veszprém), Mirko Alilović (CRO, MVM Veszprém)
May 2016	Aron Palmarsson (ISL)	(Hungary) MVM Veszprém KC	Mikkel Hansen (DEN, Paris Saint-Germain Handball), Sławomir Szmal (POL, KS Vive Tauron Kielce), Krzysztof Lijewski (POL, KS Vive Tauron Kielce), Domagoj Duvnjak (CRO, THW Kiel)
June 2016	Dejan Manaskov (MKD)	(North Macedonia) RK Vardar	Dean Bombač (SLO, MOL-Pick Szeged), Siarhei Rutenka (BLR, FC Barcelona Lassa), Petar Nenadić (SRB, Füchse Berlin), Máté Lékai (HUN, MVM Veszprem)
July/August 2016	Daniel Dujshebaev (ESP)	(Spain) Atlético Valladolid	Melvyn Richardson (FRA, Chambéry Savoie), Kyllian Villeminot (FRA, Montpellier HB), Tim Suton (GER, TVB Lemgo)
September 2016	Uwe Gensheimer (GER)	(France) Paris Saint-Germain Handball	Filip Taleski (MKD, HC Metalurg), Rodrigo Corrales (ESP, Orlen Wisla Plock), Kentin Mahé (FRA, SG Flensburg-Handewitt), Miha Zarabec (SLO, Celje Pivovarna Laško)
October 2016	Blaž Janc (SLO)	(Slovenia) RK Celje Pivovarna Laško	Filip Ivić (CRO, Vive Tauron Kielce), Nedim Remili (FRA, Paris Saint-Germain Handball), Nikola Karabatić (FRA, Paris Saint-Germain Handball), Wael Jallouz (TUN, FC Barcelona Lassa), Jakub Hrstka (CZE, Tatran Presov)
November 2016	Andy Schmid (SUI)	(Germany) Rhein-Neckar Löwen	Thierry Omeyer (FRA Paris Saint-Germain Handball), Filip Ivić (CRO, Vive Tauron Kielce), Kiril Lazarov (MKD, FC Barcelona Lassa), Uwe Gensheimer (GER, Paris Saint-Germain Handball)
December 2016	Kiril Lazarov (MKD)	(Spain) FC Barcelona Lassa	Filip Ivić (CRO, Vive Tauron Kielce), Jonas Källman (SWE, MOL-Pick Szeged), Julen Aguinagalde (ESP, Vive Tauron Kielce), Alex Dujshebaev (ESP, HC Vardar)
January 2017	Sander Sagosen (NOR)	(Denmark) Aalborg Håndbold	Nedim Remili (FRA, Paris Saint Germain Handball), Kentin Mahé (FRA, SG Flensburg-Handewitt), Vincent Gerard (FRA, Montpellier HB), Jure Dolenec (SLO, Montpellier HB)
February 2017	Julen Aguinagalde (ESP)	(Poland) KS Vive Tauron Kielce	Andy Schmid (SUI, Rhein-Neckar Löwen), Borut Mačkovšek (SLO, RK Celje Pivovarna Laško), Timur Dibirov (RUS, RK Vardar), Sørenn Rasmussen (DEN, SG Flensburg-Handewitt)
March 2017	Momir Ilić (SRB)	(Hungary) Telekom Veszprém	Mattias Andersson (SWE, SG Flensburg-Handewitt), Gábor Császár (HUN, Kadetten Schaffhausen), Julen Aguinagalde (ESP, Vive Tauron Kielce), Jure Dolenec (SLO, Montpellier HB)
April 2017	Gonzalo Perez de Vargas (ESP)	(Spain) FC Barcelona Lassa	Luka Cindrić (CRO, HC Vardar), Nikola Karabatić (FRA, Paris Saint-Germain Handball), Árpád Sterbik (ESP, HC Vardar), László Nagy (HUN, Telekom Veszprém)
May 2017	Sander Sagosen (NOR)	(Denmark) Aalborg Håndbold	Hans Lindberg (DEN, Füchse Berlin), Aron Pálmarsson (ISL, Telekom Veszprém), Lars Kaufmann (GER, Frisch Auf Göppingen), Kiril Lazarov (MKD, FC Barcelona Lassa)
June 2017	Luka Cindrić (CRO)	(North Macedonia) RK Vardar	Árpád Sterbik (ESP, RK Vardar), Vuko Borozan (MNE, RK Vardar), Thierry Omeyer (FRA, Paris Saint-Germain Handball), Nikola Bilyk (AUT, THW Kiel)
July/August 2017	Ludvig Hallbäck (SWE)	(Sweden) Ystads IF	Yoav Lubroso (ISR), Giorgi Tskhonrebadze (GEO), Andre Bergsholm Kristensen (NOR, Sandefjord Handball), Lukas Hutecek (AUT, Fivers WAT Margareten)
September 2017	Máté Lékai (HUN)	(Hungary) Telekom Veszprém	Rasmus Lauge Schmidt (DEN, SG Flensburg-Handewitt), Mattias Andersson (SWE, SG Flensburg-Handewitt), Žiga Mlakar (SLO, RK Celje Pivovarna Laško), Sander Sagosen (NOR, Paris Saint-Germain Handball)
October 2017	Árpád Sterbik (ESP)	(North Macedonia) RK Vardar	Andy Schmid (SUI, Rhein-Neckar Löwen), Sander Sagosen (NOR, Paris Saint-Germain Handball), Vuko Borozan (MNE, HC Vardar), Momir Ilić (SRB, Telekom Veszprém HC)
November/December 2017	Árpád Sterbik (ESP)	(North Macedonia) RK Vardar	David Balaguer (ESP, HBC Nantes), Uwe Gensheimer (GER, Paris Saint-Germain Handball), Thierry Omeyer (FRA, Paris Saint-Germain Handball), Vuko Borozan (MNE, HC Vardar)
January 2018	Ondřej Zdráhala (CZE)	(Switzerland) TSV St. Otmar St. Gallen	Jim Gottfridsson (SWE, SG Flensburg-Handewitt), Ferran Solé (ESP, Fenix Toulouse HB), Rasmus Lauge Schmidt (DEN, SG Flensburg-Handewitt), Mikael Appelgren (SWE, Rhein-Neckar Löwen)
February 2018	Andy Schmid (SUI)	(Germany) Rhein-Neckar Löwen	Raul Entrerrios (ESP, FC Barcelona Lassa), Melvyn Richardson (FRA, Montpellier HB), Matthias Musche (GE, SC Magdeburg), Dika Mem (FRA, FC Barcelona Lassa)
March 2018	Tibor Ivanišević (SRB)	(Denmark) Skjern Håndbold	Melvyn Richardson (FRA, Montpellier HB), Cyril Dumoulin (FRA, HBC Nantes), Marko Vujin (SRB, THW Kiel), Niklas Landin (DEN, THW Kiel)
April 2018	Nedim Remili (FRA)	(France) PSG Handball	Jonas Truchanovičius (LTU, Montpellier HB), Nicolas Tournat (FRA, HBC Nantes), Dominik Klein (GER, HBC Nantes), Alex Dujshebaev (ESP, PGE Vive Kielce)
May 2018	Diego Simonet (ARG)	(France) Montpellier	Kiril Lazarov (MKD, HBC Nantes), Cyril Dumoulin (FRA, HBC Nantes), Nicolas Tournat (FRA, HBC Nantes), Vincent Gerard (FRA, Montpellier)
June 2018	Nikola Bilyk (AUT)	(Germany) THW Kiel	Andy Schmid (SUI, Rein-Neckar Löwen), Sander Sagosen (NOR, PSG Handball), Guðjón Valur Sigurðsson (ISL, Rein-Neckar Löwen), Vid Kavtičnik (SLO, Montpellier)
July/August 2018	Ludvig Hallbäck (SWE)	(Sweden) Ystads IF	
September 2018	Alex Dujshebaev (ESP)	(Poland) Vive Targi Kielce	Dejan Milosavljev (SRB, HC Vardar), Dika Mem (FRA, Barcelona Lassa), Andy Schmid (SUI, Rein-Neckar Löwen), Vuko Borozan (MNE, HC Vardar)
October 2018	Sander Sagosen (NOR)	(France) Paris Saint-Germain Handball	Jóhan Hansen (DEN, Bjerringbro-Silkeborg), Alex Dujshebaev (ESP, PGE Vive Kielce), Uwe Gensheimer (GER), Paris Saint-Germain HB), Roland Mikler (HUN, Telekom Veszprém HC)
November 2018	Casper U. Mortensen (DEN)	(Spain) FC Barcelona Lassa	Valter Chrintz (SWE, IFK Kristianstad), Melvyn Richardson (FRA, Montpellier HB), Roland Mikler (HUN, Telekom Veszprém), Nico Rönnberg (FIN, Riihimäem Cocks)
December 2018	Andy Schmid (SUI)	(Germany) Rhein-Neckar Löwen	Uwe Gensheimer (GER, Paris Saint-Germain), Roland Mikler (HUN, Telekom Veszprém), Melvyn Richardson (FRA, Montpellier Handball), Zlatko Horvat (CRO, RK Zagreb)
January 2019	Mikkel Hansen (DEN)	(France) Paris Saint-Germain Handball	Sander Sagosen (NOR, Paris Saint-Germain), Niklas Landin (DEN, THW Kiel), Kentin Mahé (FRA, Telekom Veszprém), Rasmus Lauge Schmidt (DEN, SG Flensburg-Handewitt)
February 2019	Barys Pukhouski (BLR)	(Ukraine) Motor Zaporizhzhia	Andy Schmid (SUI, Rhein-Neckar Löwen), Kentin Mahé (FRA, Telekom Veszprém), Michal Jurecki (POL, Vive Kielce), Luc Abalo (FRA, Paris Saint-Germain)
March 2019	Romain Lagarde (FRA)	(France) HBC Nantes	Jannik Kohlbacher (GER, Rhein-Neckar Löwen), Mirko Alilović (CRO, MOL-Pick Szeged), Alex Dujshebaev (ESP, PGE Vive Kielce), Andy Schmid (SUI, Rhein-Neckar Löwen)
April 2019	Luka Cindrić (CRO)	(Poland) PGE Vive Kielce	Vladimir Cupara (SRB, PGE Vive Kielce), Ludovic Fabregas (FRA, Barcelona Lassa), Igor Karačić (CRO, RK Vardar), Roland Mikler (HUN, Telekom Veszprém)
May 2019	Niklas Landin (DEN)	(Germany) THW Kiel	Dejan Milosavljev (SRB, Vardar), Vladimir Cupara (SRB, PGE Vive Kielce), Igor Karačić (CRO, Vardar), Nedim Remili (FRA, Paris Saint-Germain)
June 2019	Dainis Krištopāns (LAT)	(North Macedonia) RK Vardar	Igor Karačić (CRO, Vardar), Dejan Milosavljev (SRB, Vardar), Alex Dujshebaev (ESP, PGE Vive Kielce), Petar Nenadić (SRB, Telekom Veszprém)
July/August 2019	Kristoffer Henriksen (NOR)	(Norway) Halden Topphåndball	
September 2019	Bogdan Radivojević (SRB)	(Hungary) MOL-Pick Szeged	Sebastian Barthold (NOR, Aalborg), Nikola Bilyk (AUT, THW Kiel), Marin Šego (CRO, Montpellier), Melvyn Richardson (FRA, Montpellier)
October 2019	Niklas Landin (DEN)	(Germany) THW Kiel	Aron Pálmarsson (ISL, FC Barcelona Lassa), Luka Cindrić (CRO, FC Barcelona Lassa), Lukas Nilsson (SWE, THW Kiel), Rasmus Lauge Schmidt (DEN, Veszprém)
November 2019	Andreas Wolff (GER)	(Poland) PGE Vive Kielce	Luka Cindrić (CRO, FC Barcelona Lassa), Aleix Gómez (ESP, FC Barcelona Lassa), Petar Nenadić (SRB, Telekom Veszprém), Artsem Karalek (BLR, PGE Vive Kielce)
December 2019	Petar Nenadić (SRB)	(Hungary) Telekom Veszprém	Luka Cindrić (CRO, FC Barcelona Lassa), Aron Pálmarsson (ISL, FC Barcelona Lassa), Mikkel Hansen (DEN, Paris Saint-Germain), Sander Sagosen (NOR, Paris Saint-Germain)
January 2020	Domagoj Duvnjak (CRO)	(Germany) THW Kiel	Sander Sagosen (NOR, Paris Saint-Germain), Alex Dujshebaev (ESP, Vive Kielce), Gonzalo Perez de Vargas (ESP, FC Barcelona Lassa), Raúl Entrerríos (ESP, FC Barcelona Lassa)
February 2020	Hugo Descat (FRA)	(France) Montpellier Handball	Sander Sagosen (NOR, Paris Saint-Germain), Wesley Pardin (FRA, Pays d'Aix Université Club), Joan Cañellas (ESP, MOL-Pick Szeged), Saeid Heidarirad (IRI, CS Dinamo București)

=== Titles by players ===
Titles by players
Player	Nation	Titles won
Sander Sagosen	Norway	3
Andy Schmid	Switzerland	3
Luka Cindrić	Croatia	2
Ludvig Hallbäck	Sweden	2
Niklas Landin	Denmark	2
Árpád Sterbik	Spain	2
Andreas Wolff	Germany	2
Julen Aguinagalde	Spain	1
Nikola Bilyk	Austria	1
Dean Bombač	Slovenia	1
Hugo Descat	France	1
Alex Dujshebaev	Spain	1
Daniel Dujshebaev	Spain	1
Domagoj Duvnjak	Croatia	1
Uwe Gensheimer	Germany	1
Mikkel Hansen	Denmark	1
Kristoffer Henrikssen	Norway	1
Momir Ilić	Serbia	1
Tibor Ivanišević	Serbia	1
Blaž Janc	Slovenia	1
Dominik Klein	Germany	1
Dainis Krištopāns	Latvia	1
Romain Lagarde	France	1
Rasmus Lauge Schmidt	Denmark	1
Kiril Lazarov	North Macedonia	1
Máté Lékai	Hungary	1
Dejan Manaskov	North Macedonia	1
Petar Nenadić	Serbia	1
Aron Palmarsson	Iceland	1
Gonzalo Pérez de Vargas	Spain	1
Barys Pukhouski	Belarus	1
Bogdan Radivojević	Serbia	1
Nedim Remili	France	1
Diego Simonet	Argentina	1
Ondřej Zdráhala	Czech Republic	1

=== Titles by clubs ===
Titles by clubs
Team	Titles won
(North Macedonia) RK Vardar	5
(Germany) THW Kiel	5
(France) Paris Saint-Germain	4
(Poland) PGE Vive Kielce	4
(Hungary) Telekom Veszprém	4
(Spain) FC Barcelona	3
(Germany) Rhein Neckar Löwen	3
(Denmark) Aalborg Håndbold	2
(Hungary) MOL-Pick Szeged	2
(Spain) Atletico Valladolid	2
(France) Montpellier	2
(Slovenia) Celje Pivovarna Laško	1
(Norway) Halden Topphåndball	1
(France) HBC Nantes	1
(Germany) HSG Wetzlar	1
(Ukraine) Motor Zaporizhzhia	1
(Germany) SG Flensburg Handewitt	1
(Denmark) Skjern Håndbold	1
(Switzerland) TSV St. Otmar St. Gallen	1
(Sweden) Ystads IF	1

=== Titles by country ===
Titles by country
Country	Titles won
Spain	6
Denmark	5
Croatia	3
France	3
North Macedonia	2
Slovenia	2
Sweden	2
Argentina	1
Austria	1
Belarus	1
Czech Republic	1
Hungary	1
Iceland	1
Latvia	1

== Female winners ==
As of 6 March 2020

Month	Player	Club	Also nominated
January 2016	Katrine Lunde (NOR)	(Russia) Rostov-Don	Ekaterina Ilina (RUS, Rostov-Don), Nycke Groot (NED, Győri Audi ETO KC), Allison Pineau (FRA, HCM Baia Mare), Dragana Cvijić (SRB, Budućnost)
February 2016	Allison Pineau (FRA)	(Romania) HCM Baia Mare	Ekaterina Ilina (RUS, Rostov-Don), Nora Mørk (NOR, Larvik HK), Katarina Bulatović (MNE, Budućnost), Amandine Leynaud (FRA, HC Vardar)
March 2016	Andrea Penezić (CRO)	(North Macedonia) RK Vardar	Cristina Neagu (ROU, Budućnost), Anna Vyakhireva (RUS, Astrakhanochka), Amandine Leynaud (FRA, HC Vardar), Nerea Pena (ESP, FTC Rail-Cargo Hungaria)
April 2016	Isabelle Gulldén (SWE)	(Romania) CSM București	Heidi Løke (NOR, Győri Audi ETO KC), Cristina Neagu (ROU, Budućnost), Amandine Leynaud (FRA, HC Vardar), Ekaterina Ilina (RUS, Rostov-Don)
May 2016	Isabelle Gulldén (SWE)	(Romania) CSM București	Jelena Grubišić (CRO, CSM Bucuresti), Nathalie Hagman (SWE, Team Tvis Holstebro), Heidi Løke (NOR, Györi Audi ETO KC), Eduarda Amorim (BRA, Györi Audi ETO KC)
June 2016	Karolina Kudłacz-Gloc (POL)	(Germany) HC Leipzig	Milena Raičević (MNE, Budućnost), Katarina Krpež Šlezak (SRB, ÉRD HC), Neli Irman (SLO, Budućnost), Katrin Engel (AUT, Thüringer HC)
July/August 2016	Dione Housheer (NED)	(Netherlands) Success Schoonmaak/VOC Amsterdam	Thea Stankiewicz (SWE, Fana IL), Laerke Sofie Sörensen (DEN, SK Aarhus)
September 2016	Karolina Kudłacz-Gloc (POL)	(Germany) HC Leipzig	Emilie Christensen (NOR, Glassverket), Laura Celeste Rotondo (ITA, Indeco Conversano), Laura Kamdop (FRA, Krim Mercator), Veronika Galušková (CZE, Slavia Praha)
October 2016	Laura van der Heijden (NED)	(Denmark) Team Esbjerg	Andrea Penezić (CRO, HC Vardar), Nora Mørk (NOR, Györi Audi ETO KC), Eduarda Amorim (BRA, Györi Audi ETO KC), Aneta Benko (CRO, RK Krim Mercator)
November 2016	Elizabeth Omoregie (BUL)	(Slovenia) RK Krim Mercator	Linn Kristin Riegelhuth (NOR, Larvik), Nora Mørk (NOR, Györi Audi ETO KC), Stine Jørgensen (DEN, FC Midtjylland), Karina Sabirova (RUS, Astrakhanochka)
December 2016	Nycke Groot (NED)	(Hungary) Györi Audi ETO KC	Nora Mørk (NOR, Györi Audi ETO KC), Tess Wester (NED, SG BBM Bietigheim), Clara Woltering (GER, Borussia Dortmund), Cristina Neagu (ROU, Budućnost)
January 2017	Amanda Kurtović (NOR)	(Norway) Larvik HK	Karina Sabirova (RUS, Astrakhanochka), Anita Görbicz (HUN, Györi Audi ETO KC), Stine Jørgensen (DEN, FC Midtjylland), Blanka Bíró (HUN, FTC-Rail Cargo Hungaria)
February 2017	Katarina Bulatović (MNE)	(Montenegro) Budućnost	Karina Sabirova (RUS, Astrakhanochka), Amanda Kurtović (NOR, Larvik), Anita Görbicz (HUN, Györi Audi ETO KC), Andrea Penezić (CRO, RK Vardar)
March 2017	Nora Mørk (NOR)	(Hungary) Győri Audi ETO KC	Katarina Bulatović (MNE, Budućnost), Isabelle Gulldén (SWE, CSM Bucuresti), Ana Gros (SLO, Metz Handball), Blanka Bíró (HUN, FTC-Rail Cargo Hungaria)
April 2017	Cristina Neagu (ROU)	(Montenegro) Budućnost	Carmen Martín (ESP, CSM Bucuresti), Isabelle Gulldén (SWE, CSM Bucuresti), Nora Mørk (NOR, Győri Audi ETO KC), Andrea Penezić (CRO, RK Vardar)
May 2017	Anita Görbicz (HUN)	(Hungary) Győri Audi ETO KC	Anja Althaus (GER, HC Vardar), Nycke Groot (NED, Györi Audi ETO KC), Kari Aalvik Grimsbø (NOR, Györi Audi ETO KC), Yvette Broch (NED, Györi Audi ETO KC)
June 2017	Anita Görbicz (HUN)	(Hungary) Győri Audi ETO KC	Tamara Mavsar (SLO, HC Vardar), Michaela Hrbková (CZE, Frisch Auf Göppingen), Đurđina Jauković (MNE, Budućnost), Daria Samokhina (RUS, Astrakhanochka)
July/August 2017	Méline Nocandy (FRA)	(France) Metz Handball	Kristina Jørgensen (DEN, Viborg HK), Jannela Blonbou (FRA, OGC Nice), Sorina Tîrcă (ROU, ASC Corona 2010 Brasov), Zoe Sprengers (NED, Succes Schoonmaak/VOC Amsterdam)
September 2017	Karolina Kudłacz-Gloc (POL)	(Germany) SG BBM Bietigheim	Malin Aune (NOR, Vipers Kristiansand), Marija Gedroit (LTU, TSV Bayer Leverkusen), Cristina Neagu (ROU, CSM Bucuresti), Anita Görbicz (HUN, Györi Audi ETO KC)
October 2017	Ana Gros (SLO)	(France) Metz Handball	Iveta Luzumová (CZE, Thüringer HC), Louise Burgaard (DEN, FC Midtjylland), Cristina Neagu (ROU, CSM Bucuresti), Kim Naidzinavicius (GER, SG BBM Bietigheim)
November/December 2017	Iveta Luzumova (CZE)	(Germany) Thüringer HC	Veronica Kristiansen (NOR, FC Midtjylland), Ana Gros (SLO, Metz Handball), Cristina Neagu (ROU, CSM Bucuresti), Jovanka Radičević (MNE, HC Vardar)
January 2018	Amanda Kurtović (NOR)	(Romania) CSM București	Cristina Neagu (ROU, CSM Bucuresti), Dragana Cvijić (SRB, HC Vardar), Anna Vyakhireva (RUS, Rostov-Don), Allison Pineau (FRA, Brest Bretagne)
February 2018	Paula Ungureanu (ROU)	(Romania) CSM București	Iveta Luzumova (CZE, Thüringer HC), Nycke Groot (NED, Györi Audi ETO KC), Ana Gros (SLO, Metz Handball), Daria Dmitrieva (RUS, Lada Togliatti)
March 2018	Daria Dmitrieva (RUS)	(Russia) HC Lada	Cristina Neagu (ROU, CSM Bucuresti), Stine Oftedal (NOR, Györi Audi ETO KC), Jovanka Radičević (MNE, HC Vardar), Katrine Lunde (NOR, Vipers Kristiansand)
April 2018	Anita Görbicz (HUN)	(Hungary) Győri Audi ETO KC	Veronica Kristiansen (NOR, FC Midtjylland), Anna Vyakhireva (RUS, Rostov-Don), Isabelle Gulldén (SWE, CSM Bucuresti), Milena Raičević (MNE, ZRK Buducnost)
May 2018	Eduarda Amorim (BRA)	(Hungary) Győri Audi ETO KC	Amandine Leynaud (FRA, HC Vardar), Stine Oftedal (NOR, Győri Audi ETO KC), Nycke Groot (NED, Győri Audi ETO KC), Andrea Lekić (SRB, HC Vardar)
June 2018	Anna Vyakhireva (RUS)	(Russia) Rostov-Don	Katarina Krpež Šlezak (SRB, Érdi VSE), Eliza Buceschi (ROU, Corona Brasov), Iveta Luzumová (CZE, Thüringer HC), Dóra Hornyák (HUN, FTC Rail-Cargo Hungária)
July/August 2018	Blanka Kajdon (HUN)	(Hungary) NEKA	
September 2018	Maura Visser (NED)	(Germany) SG BBM Bietigheim	Natalia Chigirinova (RUS, Podravka Vegeta), Laura van der Heijden (NED, SG BBM Bietigheim), Jelena Trifunović (SRB, SCM Craiova), Tereza Pokorná (CZE, DHC Slavia Praha)
October 2018	Anna Vyakhireva (RUS)	(Russia) Rostov-Don	Anikó Kovacsics (HUN, FTC-Rail Cargo Hungaria), Cristina Neagu (ROU, CSM Bucuresti), Eduarda Amorim (BRA, Györi Audi ETO KC), Ana Gros (SLO, Brest Bretagne Handball)
November 2018	Cristina Neagu (ROU)	(Romania) CSM București	Anikó Kovacsics (HUN, FTC-Rail Cargo Hungaria), Anna Vyakhireva (RUS, Rostov-Don), Eduarda Amorim (BRA, Györi Audi ETO KC), Noémi Háfra (HUN, FTC-Rail Cargo Hungaria)
December 2018	Anna Vyakhireva (RUS)	(Russia) Rostov-Don	Katarina Krpež Šlezak (SRB, ÉRD HC), Cristina Neagu (ROU, CSM București), Amandine Leynaud (FRA, Győri Audi ETO KC), Estelle Nze Minko (FRA, Siófok KC)
January 2019	Crina Pintea (ROU)	(Hungary) Győri Audi ETO KC	Ana Gros (SLO, Brest Bretagne Handball), Andrea Kobetić (CRO, Siófok KC), Nerea Pena (ESP, FTC-Rail Cargo Hungaria), Milena Raičević (MNE, Budućnost)
February 2019	Katrin Klujber (HUN)	(Hungary) FTC-Rail Cargo Hungaria	Nycke Groot (NED, Győri Audi ETO KC), Helene Gigstad Fauske (NOR, Herning Ikast Handbold), Grâce Zaadi (FRA, Metz Handball), Mireya González (ESP, Siófok KC)
March 2019	Nycke Groot (NED)	(Hungary) Győri Audi ETO KC	Xenia Smits (GER, Metz Handball), Anna Sen (RUS, Rostov-Don), Ana Gros (SLO, Brest Bretagne), Stine Oftedal (NOR, Győri Audi ETO KC)
April 2019	Andrea Kobetić (CRO)	(Hungary) Siófok KC	Lois Abbingh (NED, Rostov-Don), Katrine Lunde (NOR, Vipers Kristiansand), Stine Oftedal (NOR, Győri Audi ETO KC), Yulia Managarova (RUS, Rostov-Don)
May 2019	Eduarda Amorim (BRA)	(Hungary) Győri Audi ETO KC	Amandine Leynaud (FRA, Győri Audi ETO KC), Andrea Kobetić (CRO, Siófok KC), Anna Vyakhireva (RUS, Rostov-Don), Estelle Nze Minko (FRA, Siófok KC)
June 2019	Nerea Pena (ESP)	(Hungary) FTC-Rail Cargo Hungaria	Heidi Løke (NOR, Storhamar HE), Katrin Klujber (HUN, FTC-Rail Cargo Hungaria), Jovanka Radičević (MNE, CSM București), Mikaela Mässing (SWE, H 65 Höör)
July/August 2019	Blanka Kajdon (HUN)	(Hungary) NEKA	
September 2019	Anna Vyakhireva (RUS)	(Russia) Rostov-Don	Katrin Klujber (HUN, FTC-Rail Cargo Hungaria), Ana Gros (SLO, Brest Bretagne), Jovanka Radičević (MNE, Budućnost), Jelena Lavko (SRB, Érd HC)
October 2019	Katrin Klujber (HUN)	(Hungary) FTC-Rail Cargo Hungaria	Ana Gros (SLO, Brest Bretagne), Grâce Zaadi (FRA, Metz Handball), Eduarda Amorim (BRA, Győri Audi ETO KC), Rikke Poulsen (DEN, Team Esbjerg)
November 2019	Jovanka Radičević (MNE)	(Montenegro) Budućnost Podgorica	Ana Gros (SLO, Brest Bretagne), Stine Oftedal (NOR, Győri Audi ETO KC), Tess Wester (NED, Odense Håndbold), Emilie Hegh Arntzen (NOR, Vipers Kristiansand)
December 2019	Anna Vyakhireva (RUS)	(Russia) Rostov-Don	Lois Abbingh (NED, Rostov-Don), Tess Wester (NED, Odense Håndbold), Estavana Polman (NED, Team Esbjerg), Alexandrina Cabral (ESP, Nantes Atlantique HB)
January 2020	Elena Mikhaylichenko (RUS)	(Russia) HC Lada	Ana Gros (SLO, Brest Bretagne), Estavana Polman (NED, Team Esbjerg), Nycke Groot (NED, Odense Håndbold), Nadine Schatzl (HUN, FTC-Rail Cargo Hungaria)
February 2020	Cristina Neagu (ROU)	(Romania) CSM București	Jovanka Radičević (MNE, ŽRK Budućnost Podgorica), Estavana Polman (NED, Team Esbjerg), Helene Gigstad Fauske (NOR, Herning-Ikast Håndbold), Ana Gros (SLO, Brest Bretagne HB)

== See also ==
- EHF Players of the Year
