= Handball at the 2016 Summer Olympics – Women's team rosters =

This article shows the rosters of all participating teams at the women's handball tournament at the 2016 Summer Olympics in Rio de Janeiro.

Age, caps and goals as of the start of the tournament, 6 August 2016.

== Group A ==
=== Angola ===
The following is the Angola roster in the women's handball tournament of the 2016 Summer Olympics.

Head coach: Filipe Cruz

No.	Pos.	Name	Date of birth (age)	Height	App.	Goals	Club
1	GK	Neyde Barbosa	23 September 1980 (aged 35)	1.77 m	38	1	(Angola) Progresso do Sambizanga
6	RW	Juliana Machado	6 November 1994 (aged 21)	1.70 m	25	48	(Angola) Primeiro de Agosto
8	CB	Lurdes Monteiro	11 July 1984 (aged 32)	1.70 m	32	49	(Angola) Primeiro de Agosto
9	CB	Natália Bernardo	25 December 1986 (aged 29)	1.70 m	73	192	(Angola) Primeiro de Agosto
10	P	Albertina Kassoma	12 June 1996 (aged 20)	1.90 m	14	39	(Angola) Primeiro de Agosto
11	LB	Luísa Kiala	25 January 1982 (aged 34)	1.72 m	104	194	(Angola) Petro de Luanda
12	GK	Cristina Branco	15 March 1985 (aged 31)	1.70 m	59	0	(Angola) Primeiro de Agosto
15	RB	Azenaide Carlos	14 June 1990 (aged 26)	1.75 m	50	150	(Angola) Petro de Luanda
16	GK	Teresa Almeida	5 May 1988 (aged 28)	1.78 m	32	0	(Angola) Petro de Luanda
17	RB	Wuta Dombaxe	5 April 1986 (aged 30)	1.73 m	32	64	(Angola) Primeiro de Agosto
21	LB	Magda Cazanga	28 May 1991 (aged 25)	1.84 m	21	28	(Angola) Petro de Luanda
25	P	Liliana Venâncio	19 September 1995 (aged 20)	1.86 m	6	3	(Angola) Primeiro de Agosto
31	LW	Janete dos Santos	10 June 1991 (aged 25)	1.75 m	10	0	(Angola) Progresso do Sambizanga
90	CB	Isabel Guialo	8 April 1990 (aged 26)	1.72 m	33	60	(Angola) Primeiro de Agosto

=== Brazil ===
The following is the Brazilian roster in the women's handball tournament of the 2016 Summer Olympics.

Head coach: (Denmark) Morten Soubak

No.	Pos.	Name	Date of birth (age)	Height	App.	Goals	Club
2	P	Fabiana Diniz	13 May 1981 (aged 35)	1.83 m	205	347	(Germany) SG BBM Bietigheim
3	RW	Alexandra do Nascimento	16 September 1981 (aged 34)	1.77 m	178	703	(Hungary) Vác
4	LW	Samira Rocha	26 January 1989 (aged 27)	1.70 m	94	224	(Hungary) Kisvárda
5	P	Daniela Piedade	2 March 1979 (aged 37)	1.73 m	186	336	(Hungary) Alba Fehérvár
7	P	Tamires Morena Lima	16 May 1994 (aged 22)	1.80 m	38	20	(France) Cercle Dijon Bourgogne
8	LW	Fernanda da Silva	25 September 1989 (aged 26)	1.76 m	98	281	(Germany) SG BBM Bietigheim
9	CB	Ana Paula Belo	18 October 1987 (aged 28)	1.72 m	141	517	(Russia) Rostov-Don
10	RW	Jéssica Quintino	17 April 1991 (aged 25)	1.76 m	89	189	(Denmark) HC Odense
12	GK	Bárbara Arenhart	4 October 1986 (aged 29)	1.82 m	104	4	(Hungary) Vác
15	CB	Francielle da Rocha	6 October 1992 (aged 23)	1.64 m	58	74	(Brazil) Vegus/Guarulhos
18	LB	Eduarda Amorim	23 September 1986 (aged 29)	1.86 m	145	480	(Hungary) Győri ETO
22	RB	Mayara Moura	5 December 1986 (aged 29)	1.70 m	93	146	(Brazil) EC Pinheiros
81	RB	Deonise Cavaleiro	20 June 1983 (aged 33)	1.80 m	150	331	(Denmark) HC Odense
84	GK	Mayssa Pessoa	11 August 1984 (aged 31)	1.80 m	77	0	(North Macedonia) Vardar

=== Montenegro ===
The following is the Montenegrin roster in the women's handball tournament of the 2016 Summer Olympics.

Head coach: Dragan Adžić

No.	Pos.	Name	Date of birth (age)	Height	App.	Goals	Club
1	GK	Marina Vukčević	24 August 1993 (aged 22)	1.78 m	90	0	(France) Metz Handball
2	RW	Radmila Miljanić-Petrović	19 April 1988 (aged 28)	1.57 m	127	180	(Montenegro) Budućnost
4	RW	Jovanka Radičević	23 October 1986 (aged 29)	1.69 m	134	709	(North Macedonia) Vardar
8	RW	Marija Jovanović	26 December 1985 (aged 30)	1.82 m	132	507	(France) Issy-Paris Hand
9	LB	Djurdjina Jauković	24 February 1997 (aged 19)	1.85 m	31	67	(Montenegro) Budućnost
10	CB	Anđela Bulatović	15 January 1987 (aged 29)	1.75 m	117	176	(Hungary) Érd
15	RB	Andrea Klikovac	5 May 1991 (aged 25)	1.74 m	50	20	(North Macedonia) Vardar
17	LB	Bojana Popović	20 November 1979 (aged 36)	1.85 m	49	311	(Montenegro) Budućnost
22	GK	Sonja Barjaktarović	11 September 1986 (aged 29)	1.80 m	129	0	(Turkey) Bursa Osmangazi Bld. SK
32	RB	Katarina Bulatović	15 November 1984 (aged 31)	1.86 m	69	397	(Montenegro) Budućnost
66	P	Ema Ramusović	28 November 1996 (aged 19)	1.82 m	29	20	(Montenegro) Budućnost
77	LW	Majda Mehmedović	25 May 1990 (aged 26)	1.69 m	95	213	(Romania) CSM București
88	LW	Biljana Pavićević	12 May 1988 (aged 28)	1.70 m	51	71	(Montenegro) Budućnost
90	LB	Milena Knežević	12 March 1990 (aged 26)	1.78 m	122	350	(Montenegro) Budućnost
92	P	Suzana Lazović	28 January 1992 (aged 24)	1.76 m	92	105	(Montenegro) Budućnost

=== Norway ===
The following is the Norwegian roster in the women's handball tournament of the 2016 Summer Olympics.

Head coach: (Iceland) Thorir Hergeirsson

No.	Pos.	Name	Date of birth (age)	Height	App.	Goals	Club
1	GK	Kari Aalvik Grimsbø	4 January 1985 (aged 31)	1.80 m	137	0	(Hungary) Győri ETO
2	LB	Mari Molid	8 August 1990 (aged 25)	1.78 m	92	56	(Denmark) Randers HK
3	CB	Emilie Hegh Arntzen	1 January 1994 (aged 22)	1.83 m	32	18	(Norway) Byåsen HE
4	LB	Veronica Kristiansen	10 July 1990 (aged 26)	1.75 m	70	189	(Denmark) FC Midtjylland
5	LB	Ida Alstad	13 June 1985 (aged 31)	1.72 m	135	308	(Norway) Byåsen HE
6	P	Heidi Løke	12 December 1982 (aged 33)	1.73 m	166	619	(Hungary) Győri ETO
9	RB	Nora Mørk	5 April 1991 (aged 25)	1.69 m	77	329	(Hungary) Győri ETO
10	CB	Stine Bredal Oftedal	25 September 1991 (aged 24)	1.68 m	115	228	(France) Issy-Paris Hand
14	P	Marit Malm Frafjord	25 November 1985 (aged 30)	1.82 m	175	357	(Norway) Larvik HK
16	GK	Katrine Lunde	30 March 1980 (aged 36)	1.80 m	253	3	(Russia) Rostov-Don
18	RW	Linn-Kristin Riegelhuth Koren	1 August 1984 (aged 32)	1.75 m	271	967	(Norway) Larvik HK
22	RW	Amanda Kurtović	25 July 1991 (aged 25)	1.75 m	73	183	(Norway) Larvik HK
23	LW	Camilla Herrem	8 October 1986 (aged 29)	1.67 m	184	483	(North Macedonia) Vardar
24	LW	Sanna Solberg	16 June 1990 (aged 26)	1.78 m	76	137	(Norway) Larvik HK

=== Romania ===
The following is the Romanian roster in the women's handball tournament of the 2016 Summer Olympics.

Head coach: (Sweden) Tomas Ryde

No.	Pos.	Name	Date of birth (age)	Height	App.	Goals	Club
3	LB	Gabriella Szűcs	31 August 1984 (aged 31)	1.79 m	5	3	(Romania) Dunărea Brăila
5	RB	Melinda Geiger	28 March 1987 (aged 29)	1.77 m	70	165	(France) Brest Bretagne Handball
7	CB	Eliza Buceschi	31 August 1993 (aged 22)	1.75 m	26	54	(Denmark) FC Midtjylland
8	LB	Cristina Neagu	26 August 1988 (aged 27)	1.80 m	128	521	(Montenegro) Budućnost
9	CB	Aurelia Brădeanu	5 May 1979 (aged 37)	1.79 m	253	637	(Romania) CSM București
11	LB	Gabriela Perianu	20 June 1994 (aged 22)	1.87 m	23	45	(Romania) Dunărea Brăila
12	GK	Ionica Munteanu	7 January 1979 (aged 37)	1.75 m	17	0	(Romania) Universitatea Cluj-Napoca
15	LW	Valentina Ardean-Elisei	5 June 1982 (aged 34)	1.75 m	205	807	(Romania) S.C.M. Craiova
22	P	Oana Manea	18 April 1985 (aged 31)	1.75 m	274	355	(Romania) CSM București
25	LW	Camelia Hotea	28 October 1984 (aged 31)	1.74 m	38	60	(Romania) Corona Brașov
30	GK	Paula Ungureanu	30 March 1980 (aged 36)	1.80 m	140	2	(Romania) CSM București
85	P	Florina Chintoan	6 December 1985 (aged 30)	1.78 m	106	140	(Romania) Universitatea Cluj-Napoca
88	RB	Patricia Vizitiu	15 October 1988 (aged 27)	1.77 m	35	48	(Romania) HCM Râmnicu Vâlcea
89	RW	Laura Chiper	21 August 1989 (aged 26)	1.73 m	15	30	(Romania) Corona Brașov

=== Spain ===
The following is the Spanish roster in the women's handball tournament of the 2016 Summer Olympics.

Head coach: Jorge Dueñas

No.	Pos.	Name	Date of birth (age)	Height	App.	Goals	Club
2	RW	Marta López	4 February 1990 (aged 26)	1.68 m	80	171	(Spain) Bera Bera
4	RW	Carmen Martín	29 May 1988 (aged 28)	1.72 m	171	564	(Romania) CSM București
6	RB	Nely Carla Alberto	2 July 1983 (aged 33)	1.79 m	118	325	(France) Chambray Touraine Handball
9	RB	Marta Mangué	23 April 1983 (aged 33)	1.70 m	284	1001	(France) Brest Bretagne Handball
10	CB	Macarena Aguilar	12 March 1985 (aged 31)	1.70 m	215	580	Unattached
12	GK	Silvia Navarro	20 March 1979 (aged 36)	1.69 m	142	3	(Spain) Remudas
14	P	Elisabeth Chávez	17 November 1990 (aged 25)	1.92 m	151	97	(France) Fleury Loiret HB
17	LW	Elisabeth Pinedo	13 May 1981 (aged 35)	1.75 m	191	417	(Spain) Bera Bera
25	CB	Nerea Pena	13 December 1989 (aged 26)	1.75 m	98	306	(Hungary) Ferencváros
27	LB	Lara González Ortega	22 February 1992 (aged 24)	1.84 m	51	60	(Denmark) Team Esbjerg
30	P	Patricia Elorza	8 April 1984 (aged 32)	1.80 m	112	71	(Spain) Bera Bera
35	LW	Naiara Egozkue	21 October 1983 (aged 32)	1.73 m	54	79	(Spain) Zuazo Barakaldo
44	P	Ainhoa Hernández	27 April 1994 (aged 22)	1.80 m	26	24	(Spain) Zuazo Barakaldo
48	GK	Darly de Paula	25 August 1982 (aged 33)	1.78 m	20	0	(Montenegro) Budućnost
86	LB	Alexandrina Barbosa	5 May 1986 (aged 30)	1.75 m	65	312	(Russia) Rostov-Don

== Group B ==
=== Argentina ===
The following is the Argentine roster in the women's handball tournament of the 2016 Summer Olympics.

Head coach: Eduardo Peruchena

No.	Pos.	Name	Date of birth (age)	Height	App.	Goals	Club
1	GK	Marisol Carratu	15 July 1986 (aged 30)	1.79 m	93	0	(Spain) Atlético Guardés
3	RW	Xoana Iacoi	3 June 1992 (aged 24)	1.62 m	15	27	(Argentina) Cideco Handball
4	RW	Lucía Haro	21 August 1986 (aged 29)	1.79 m	98	204	(Argentina) Unión Eléctrica
5	LW	Manuela Pizzo	13 November 1992 (aged 23)	1.73 m	80	238	(Argentina) Estudiantes
6	LB	Luciana Salvadó	3 April 1990 (aged 26)	1.69 m	97	296	(Argentina) Club Oeste
7	P	Rocio Campigli	6 August 1994 (aged 22)	1.73 m	45	48	(Argentina) Estudiantes
8	LW	Amelia Belotti	17 November 1988 (aged 27)	1.79 m	83	256	(Argentina) Vilo
9	RB	Luciana Mendoza	14 March 1990 (aged 26)	1.70 m	96	382	(Spain) Atlético Guardés
10	CB	Victoria Crivelli	30 September 1990 (aged 25)	1.75 m	85	150	(Argentina) Ferro Carril Oeste
12	GK	Valentina Kogan	19 March 1980 (aged 36)	1.78 m	170	3	(Argentina) Vilo
15	P	Antonela Mena	28 March 1988 (aged 28)	1.82 m	124	380	(Argentina) Cideco Handball
18	CB	Macarena Sans	20 November 1996 (aged 19)	1.64 m	38	73	(Argentina) Vilo
21	LB	Macarena Gandulfo	3 November 1993 (aged 22)	1.76 m	63	149	(Spain) Alcobendas
22	CB	Elke Karsten	15 May 1995 (aged 21)	1.77 m	32	122	(Argentina) Quilmes

=== France ===
The following is the French roster in the women's handball tournament of the 2016 Summer Olympics.

Head coach: Olivier Krumbholz

No.	Pos.	Name	Date of birth (age)	Height	App.	Goals	Club
1	GK	Laura Glauser	20 August 1993 (aged 22)	1.78 m	38	0	(France) Metz Handball
3	RW	Blandine Dancette	14 February 1988 (aged 28)	1.69 m	80	103	(France) Chambray Touraine
5	RB	Camille Ayglon	21 May 1985 (aged 31)	1.80 m	207	378	(Romania) CSM București
7	CB	Allison Pineau	2 May 1989 (aged 27)	1.81 m	182	475	(France) Brest Bretagne Handball
8	P	Laurisa Landre	27 October 1985 (aged 30)	1.74 m	38	58	(Romania) S.C.M. Craiova
10	CB	Grace Zaadi	7 July 1993 (aged 23)	1.71 m	48	65	(France) Metz Handball
12	GK	Amandine Leynaud	2 May 1988 (aged 28)	1.78 m	177	1	(North Macedonia) Vardar
13	LW	Manon Houette	2 July 1992 (aged 24)	1.68 m	26	49	(Germany) Thüringer HC
17	LW	Siraba Dembélé	28 June 1986 (aged 30)	1.72 m	211	681	(Russia) Rostov-Don
18	RW	Chloé Bulleux	18 November 1991 (aged 24)	1.72 m	26	45	(Hungary) Siófok
24	P	Béatrice Edwige	3 October 1988 (aged 27)	1.82 m	28	13	(France) Metz Handball
27	LB	Estelle Nze Minko	11 August 1991 (aged 24)	1.76 m	38	61	(Hungary) Siófok
29	LB	Gnonsiane Niombla	9 July 1990 (aged 26)	1.72 m	47	138	(Romania) CSM București
64	RB	Alexandra Lacrabère	27 April 1987 (aged 29)	1.72 m	173	541	(North Macedonia) Vardar

=== Netherlands ===
The following is the Dutch roster in the women's handball tournament of the 2016 Summer Olympics.

Head coach: (Netherlands) Henk Groener

No.	Pos.	Name	Date of birth (age)	Height	App.	Goals	Club
5	LB	Jessy Kramer	16 February 1990 (aged 26)	1.77 m	97	83	(France) Toulon Handball
6	RB	Laura van der Heijden	27 June 1990 (aged 26)	1.72 m	148	477	(Denmark) Team Esbjerg
8	LB	Lois Abbingh	13 August 1992 (aged 23)	1.77 m	92	405	(France) Issy-Paris
9	RB	Sanne van Olphen	13 March 1989 (aged 27)	1.77 m	65	110	(France) Toulon Saint-Cyr Var Handball
10	P	Danick Snelder	22 May 1990 (aged 26)	1.78 m	120	297	(Hungary) Ferencváros
13	P	Yvette Broch	23 December 1990 (aged 25)	1.85 m	84	198	(Hungary) Győri ETO
17	CB	Cornelia Groot	4 May 1988 (aged 28)	1.75 m	96	291	(Hungary) Győri ETO
18	LB	Kelly Dulfer	21 March 1994 (aged 22)	1.86 m	50	39	(Germany) VfL Oldenburg
21	LW	Michelle Goos	27 December 1989 (aged 26)	1.78 m	58	102	(Germany) Buxtehuder SV
23	GK	Jasmina Janković	6 December 1986 (aged 29)	1.68 m	56	0	(Germany) TuS Metzingen
24	LW	Martine Smeets	5 May 1990 (aged 26)	1.72 m	58	105	(Germany) SG BBM Bietigheim
26	RW	Angela Malestein	31 January 1993 (aged 23)	1.73 m	85	149	(Germany) SG BBM Bietigheim
30	RW	Jurswailly Luciano	25 March 1991 (aged 25)	1.71 m	45	104	(France) Metz Handball
33	GK	Tess Wester	19 May 1993 (aged 23)	1.78 m	43	2	(Germany) SG BBM Bietigheim
79	CB	Estavana Polman	5 August 1992 (aged 24)	1.74 m	89	293	(Denmark) Team Esbjerg

=== Russia ===
The following is the Russian roster in the women's handball tournament of the 2016 Summer Olympics. On 12 August, Tatyana Yerokhina was added to the squad after Anna Sedoykina was ruled out for the test of the tournament due to an injury.

Head coach: Yevgeni Trefilov

No.	Pos.	Name	Date of birth (age)	Height	App.	Goals	Club
1	GK	Anna Sedoykina	1 August 1984 (aged 32)	1.81 m	128	4	(Russia) Rostov-Don
2	LW	Polina Kuznetsova	10 June 1987 (aged 29)	1.70 m	119	322	(Russia) Kuban Krasnodar
7	CB	Daria Dmitrieva	9 August 1995 (aged 20)	1.78 m	43	92	(Russia) Lada Togliatti
8	LB	Anna Sen	3 February 1990 (aged 26)	1.85 m	93	222	(Russia) Rostov-Don
10	LB	Olga Akopyan	4 March 1985 (aged 31)	1.76 m	133	367	(Russia) Lada Togliatti
13	RW	Anna Vyakhireva	13 March 1995 (aged 21)	1.62 m	37	165	(Russia) Rostov-Don
15	RW	Marina Sudakova	17 February 1989 (aged 27)	1.66 m	38	56	(Russia) Kuban Krasnodar
17	LB	Vladlena Bobrovnikova	24 October 1987 (aged 28)	1.80 m	36	69	(Russia) Rostov-Don
21	LB	Victoria Zhilinskayte	6 March 1989 (aged 27)	1.88 m	110	159	(Russia) Kuban Krasnodar
22	LW	Yekaterina Marennikova	29 April 1982 (aged 34)	1.79 m	120	260	(Russia) Kuban Krasnodar
24	RB	Irina Bliznova	6 October 1986 (aged 29)	1.82 m	124	369	(Russia) Lada Togliatti
33	CB	Ekaterina Ilina	7 March 1991 (aged 25)	1.75 m	68	187	(Russia) Rostov-Don
77	P	Maya Petrova	26 May 1982 (aged 34)	1.84 m	55	82	(Russia) Rostov-Don
84	GK	Tatyana Yerokhina	7 September 1984 (aged 31)	1.85 m	21	0	(Russia) Lada Togliatti
88	GK	Victoriya Kalinina	8 December 1988 (aged 27)	1.83 m	39	0	(Russia) Kuban Krasnodar

=== South Korea ===
The following is the South Korean roster in the women's handball tournament of the 2016 Summer Olympics.

Head coach: Lim Young-chul

No.	Pos.	Name	Date of birth (age)	Height	App.	Goals	Club
1	GK	Oh Yong-ran	6 September 1972 (aged 43)	1.71 m	99	1	(South Korea) Incheon Sports Council
5	RW	Jung Yu-ra	6 February 1992 (aged 24)	1.70 m	59	317	(South Korea) Colorful Daegu
11	RB	Ryu Eun-hee	24 February 1990 (aged 26)	1.80 m	83	297	(South Korea) Incheon Sports Council
12	GK	Park Mi-ra	20 April 1987 (aged 29)	1.72 m	38	0	(South Korea) Wonderful Samcheok
13	P	Yoo Hyun-ji	16 July 1984 (aged 32)	1.75 m	89	111	(South Korea) Wonderful Samcheok
14	LB	Kim Jin-yi	20 June 1993 (aged 23)	1.81 m	50	115	(South Korea) Colorful Daegu
15	LW	Choi Su-min	9 January 1990 (aged 26)	1.77 m	49	115	(South Korea) Seoul City
17	LB	Sim Hae-in	31 October 1987 (aged 28)	1.78 m	64	117	(South Korea) Wonderful Samcheok
21	LW	Lee Eun-bi	23 October 1990 (aged 25)	1.63 m	79	166	(South Korea) BISCO
22	RW	Woo Sun-hee	1 July 1978 (aged 38)	1.72 m	119	380	(South Korea) Wonderful Samcheok
23	CB	Kim On-a	6 September 1988 (aged 27)	1.69 m	96	332	(South Korea) SK Sugar Gliders
24	CB	Gwon Han-na	22 November 1989 (aged 26)	1.72 m	82	103	(South Korea) Seoul City
27	P	Nam Yeong-sin	27 August 1990 (aged 25)	1.75 m	25	3	(South Korea) BISCO
29	RB	Yu So-jeong	4 June 1996 (aged 20)	1.68 m	19	71	(South Korea) SK Sugar Gliders

=== Sweden ===
The following is the Swedish roster in the women's handball tournament of the 2016 Summer Olympics. On 16 August, Hanna Blomstrand replaced Michaela Ek due to an injury.

Head coach: Henrik Signell

No.	Pos.	Name	Date of birth (age)	Height	App.	Goals	Club
1	GK	Johanna Bundsen	3 June 1991 (aged 25)	1.85 m	35	0	(Sweden) IK Sävehof
3	P	Frida Tegstedt	17 July 1987 (aged 29)	1.80 m	40	37	(France) Issy-Paris Hand
6	LB	Carin Strömberg	10 July 1993 (aged 23)	1.83 m	17	16	(Denmark) Viborg HK
7	P	Linn Blohm	20 May 1992 (aged 24)	1.80 m	52	117	(Denmark) FC Midtjylland
8	LB	Jamina Roberts	28 May 1990 (aged 26)	1.75 m	102	174	(Denmark) Team Tvis Holstebro
9	LW	Louise Sand	27 December 1992 (aged 23)	1.64 m	59	120	(Sweden) IK Sävehof
10	RW	Michaela Ek	1 February 1988 (aged 28)	1.73 m	7	5	(Denmark) Ringkøbing
12	GK	Filippa Idéhn	15 August 1990 (aged 25)	1.83 m	58	2	(Denmark) Team Esbjerg
17	CB	Linnea Torstenson	30 March 1983 (aged 33)	1.80 m	169	637	(Romania) CSM București
20	CB	Isabelle Gulldén	29 June 1989 (aged 27)	1.79 m	154	568	(Romania) CSM București
22	RB	Hanna Blomstrand	25 August 1996 (aged 19)	1.70 m	3	1	(Sweden) Lugi HF
24	RW	Nathalie Hagman	19 July 1991 (aged 25)	1.67 m	89	212	(Denmark) Nykøbing Falster
25	RB	Angelica Wallén	11 April 1986 (aged 30)	1.78 m	72	93	(Sweden) Skuru IK
27	RB	Sabina Jacobsen	24 March 1989 (aged 27)	1.80 m	82	121	(Denmark) FC Midtjylland
29	LB	Jenny Alm	10 April 1989 (aged 27)	1.84 m	73	185	(Denmark) Team Esbjerg

== Statistics ==
=== Player representation by club ===
Clubs with 6 or more players represented are listed.

Club	Players
(Montenegro) Budućnost	11
(Russia) Rostov-Don	10
(Romania) CSM București	9
(Angola) Primeiro de Agosto	8
(Hungary) Győri ETO	6
(North Macedonia) Vardar	6

=== Player representation by league ===
Country	Players	Percentage	Outside national squad
Total	168		
Romania	17	10%	7
Russia	17	10%	3
France	16	10%	11
Hungary	16	10%	16
Denmark	15	9%	15
Angola	14	8%	0
South Korea	14	8%	0
Montenegro	11	7%	9
Others	49	29%	

The Greek, Japanese, Italian and Hungarian squads were made up entirely of players from the respective countries' domestic leagues. The Montenegrin squad was made up entirely of players employed by abroad country clubs.

=== Coaches representation by country ===
Coaches in bold represent their own country.

Nº	Country	Coaches
2	Sweden	Tomas Ryde (Romania), **Henrik Signell**
1	Angola	**Filipe Cruz**
1	Argentina	**Eduardo Peruchena**
1	Denmark	Morten Soubak (Brazil)
1	France	**Olivier Krumbholz**
1	Iceland	Thorir Hergeirsson (Norway)
1	Montenegro	**Dragan Adžić**
1	Netherlands	**Henk Groener**
1	Russia	**Yevgeni Trefilov**
1	South Korea	**Lim Young-chul**
1	Spain	**Jorge Dueñas**

== See also ==
- Handball at the 2016 Summer Olympics – Men's team rosters
