= Handball at the 2016 Summer Olympics – Men's team rosters =

This article shows the rosters of all participating teams at the men's handball tournament at the 2016 Summer Olympics in Rio de Janeiro.

Age, caps and goals as of the start of the tournament, 7 August 2016.

== Group A ==
=== Argentina ===
The following is the Argentine roster in the men's handball tournament of the 2016 Summer Olympics.

Head coach: Eduardo Gallardo

No.	Pos.	Name	Date of birth (age)	Height	App.	Goals	Club
1	GK	Matías Schulz	12 February 1982 (aged 34)	1.90 m	172	0	(Switzerland) Pfadi Winterthur
2	LW	Federico Fernández	17 October 1989 (aged 26)	1.87 m	94	335	(Argentina) UNLu
3	RW	Federico Pizarro	6 July 1986 (aged 30)	1.83 m	127	568	(Argentina) UNLu
4	CB	Sebastián Simonet	12 May 1986 (aged 30)	1.90 m	76	328	(Spain) Ademar León
5	P	Pablo Sebastián Portela	21 June 1980 (aged 36)	1.90 m	127	62	(Argentina) Colegio Ward
8	LB	Pablo Simonet	4 May 1992 (aged 24)	1.89 m	48	98	(Spain) Benidorm
9	RB	Leonardo Facundo Querín	17 April 1982 (aged 34)	1.97 m	159	238	(France) Billère
10	RB	Federico Matías Vieyra	21 July 1988 (aged 28)	1.92 m	101	235	(Spain) Ademar León
12	GK	Fernando Gabriel García	31 August 1981 (aged 34)	1.90 m	193	5	(France) Vernon
13	LB	Juan Pablo Fernández	30 September 1988 (aged 27)	1.90 m	101	303	(Argentina) UNLu
14	LB	Agustín Vidal	8 July 1987 (aged 29)	1.94 m	80	162	(Spain) Ciudad Encantada
15	P	Gonzalo Carou	15 August 1979 (aged 36)	1.94 m	202	450	(France) Istres
18	LW	Adrián Portela	8 March 1986 (aged 30)	1.83 m	37	112	(Argentina) River Plate
23	RW	Pablo Vainstein	18 July 1987 (aged 29)	1.83 m	35	45	(Argentina) Colegio Ward

=== Croatia ===
The following is the Croatian roster in the men's handball tournament of the 2016 Summer Olympics.

Head coach: Željko Babić

No.	Pos.	Name	Date of birth (age)	Height	App.	Goals	Club
1	GK	Ivan Stevanović	18 May 1982 (aged 34)	1.93 m	15	0	(Croatia) Zagreb
5	CB	Domagoj Duvnjak	1 June 1988 (aged 28)	1.97 m	153	497	(Germany) THW Kiel
7	RB	Luka Stepančić	20 November 1990 (aged 25)	2.03 m	16	26	(France) Paris Saint-Germain
8	RB	Marko Kopljar	12 February 1986 (aged 30)	2.10 m	124	254	(Hungary) Telekom Veszprém
10	LB	Jakov Gojun	18 April 1986 (aged 30)	2.04 m	125	71	(Germany) Füchse Berlin
12	GK	Ivan Pešić	17 March 1989 (aged 27)	1.93 m	22	0	(Belarus) Meshkov Brest
13	RW	Zlatko Horvat	25 September 1984 (aged 31)	1.79 m	115	332	(Croatia) Zagreb
18	CB	Igor Karačić	2 November 1988 (aged 27)	1.89 m	27	71	(North Macedonia) Vardar
26	LW	Manuel Štrlek	1 December 1988 (aged 27)	1.81 m	99	318	(Poland) Vive Targi Kielce
27	RW	Ivan Čupić	27 March 1986 (aged 30)	1.78 m	112	440	(Poland) Vive Targi Kielce
30	LB	Marko Mamić	6 March 1994 (aged 22)	2.00 m	4	3	(France) Dunkerque
32	LB	Ivan Slišković	23 October 1991 (aged 24)	1.97 m	37	87	(Hungary) Telekom Veszprém
34	P	Ilija Brozović	26 May 1991 (aged 25)	1.95 m	15	12	(Germany) THW Kiel
44	P	Krešimir Kozina	25 June 1990 (aged 26)	1.96 m	2	0	(Germany) Flensburg-Handewitt

=== Denmark ===
The following is the Danish roster in the men's handball tournament of the 2016 Summer Olympics.

Head coach: (Iceland) Guðmundur Guðmundsson

No.	Pos.	Name	Date of birth (age)	Height	App.	Goals	Club
1	GK	Niklas Landin Jacobsen	19 December 1988 (aged 27)	2.01 m	143	1	(Germany) THW Kiel
3	RB	Mads Christiansen	3 May 1986 (aged 30)	1.94 m	106	234	(Denmark) Bjerringbro-Silkeborg
5	CB	Mads Mensah Larsen	12 August 1991 (aged 24)	1.88 m	67	157	(Germany) Rhein-Neckar Löwen
6	LW	Casper Ulrich Mortensen	14 December 1989 (aged 26)	1.90 m	73	209	(Germany) TSV Hannover-Burgdorf
15	P	Jesper Nøddesbo	23 October 1980 (aged 35)	1.99 m	201	418	(Spain) Barcelona
16	GK	Jannick Green	29 September 1988 (aged 27)	1.95 m	71	1	(Germany) SC Magdeburg
17	RW	Lasse Svan Hansen	31 August 1983 (aged 32)	1.84 m	155	316	(Germany) Flensburg-Handewitt
19	P	Rene Toft Hansen	11 January 1984 (aged 32)	2.00 m	103	163	(Germany) THW Kiel
21	LB	Henrik Møllgaard	2 January 1985 (aged 31)	1.96 m	90	136	(France) Paris Saint-Germain
22	RB	Kasper Søndergaard	9 June 1981 (aged 35)	1.96 m	162	361	(Denmark) Skjern Håndbold
23	P	Henrik Toft Hansen	18 December 1986 (aged 29)	2.00 m	77	144	(Germany) Flensburg-Handewitt
24	LB	Mikkel Hansen	22 October 1987 (aged 28)	1.96 m	151	696	(France) Paris Saint-Germain
25	CB	Morten Olsen	11 October 1984 (aged 31)	1.84 m	32	90	(Germany) TSV Hannover-Burgdorf
27	LB	Michael Damgaard	18 March 1990 (aged 26)	1.92 m	30	78	(Germany) SC Magdeburg

=== France ===
The following is the French roster in the men's handball tournament of the 2016 Summer Olympics.

Head coach: Claude Onesta

No.	Pos.	Name	Date of birth (age)	Height	App.	Goals	Club
8	LB	Daniel Narcisse	16 December 1979 (aged 37)	1.89 m	280	858	(France) Paris Saint-Germain
12	GK	Vincent Gérard	16 December 1986 (aged 30)	1.88 m	25	0	(France) Montpellier Handball
13	CB	Nikola Karabatić	11 April 1984 (aged 33)	1.96 m	252	1024	(France) Paris Saint-Germain
14	CB	Kentin Mahé	22 May 1991 (aged 26)	1.86 m	42	98	(Germany) Flensburg-Handewitt
15	LB	Mathieu Grébille	6 October 1991 (aged 25)	1.98 m	39	57	(France) Montpellier Handball
16	GK	Thierry Omeyer	2 November 1976 (aged 40)	1.92 m	328	1	(France) Paris Saint-Germain
17	LB	Timothey N'Guessan	18 September 1992 (aged 24)	1.96 m	20	35	(France) Chambéry Savoie
19	RW	Luc Abalo	6 September 1984 (aged 32)	1.82 m	196	646	(France) Paris Saint-Germain
20	P	Cédric Sorhaindo	7 June 1984 (aged 33)	1.92 m	150	302	(Spain) Barcelona
21	LW	Michaël Guigou	28 January 1982 (aged 35)	1.79 m	218	771	(France) Montpellier Handball
22	P	Luka Karabatić	19 April 1988 (aged 29)	2.02 m	42	46	(France) Paris Saint-Germain
23	P	Ludovic Fabregas	1 July 1996 (aged 21)	1.98 m	7	5	(France) Montpellier Handball
27	RB	Adrien Dipanda	3 May 1988 (aged 29)	2.02 m	7	10	(France) Saint-Raphaël
28	RB	Valentin Porte	7 September 1990 (aged 26)	1.90 m	48	114	(France) Fenix Toulouse

=== Qatar ===
The following is the Qatari roster in the men's handball tournament of the 2016 Summer Olympics.

Head coach: (Spain) Valero Rivera López

No.	Pos.	Name	Date of birth (age)	Height	App.	Goals	Club
1	RB	Žarko Marković	1 June 1986 (aged 30)	1.96 m	22	152	(Qatar) El Jaish
4	LB	Hassan Mabrouk	29 July 1982 (aged 34)	1.90 m	30	64	(Qatar) El Jaish
5	LB	Marko Bagarić	31 December 1985 (aged 30)	2.01 m			(Qatar) Al Rayyan
6	RB	Mustafa Alsaltialkrad	16 March 1987 (aged 29)	1.86 m
7	LB	Bertrand Roiné	17 February 1981 (aged 35)	1.98 m	40	70	(Qatar) Al Ahli
9	LB	Rafael Capote	5 October 1987 (aged 28)	1.96 m	34	131	(Qatar) El Jaish
11	LW	Abdulrazzaq Murad	29 June 1990 (aged 26)	1.86 m	77	169	(Qatar) Al-Gharafa
12	GK	Danijel Šarić	27 June 1977 (aged 39)	1.95 m	22	0	(Spain) Barcelona
13	RW	Eldar Memišević	21 June 1992 (aged 24)	1.78 m	100	196	(Qatar) El Jaish
14	P	Bassel Al-Rayes	4 March 1979 (aged 37)	1.80 m	36	146	(Qatar) Al Rayyan
15	RW	Nasreddine Megdich	29 August 1991 (aged 24)	1.78 m	16	27	(Qatar) Al Rayyan
16	GK	Goran Stojanović	24 February 1977 (aged 39)	1.91 m	37	0	(Qatar) El Jaish
19	P	Borja Vidal	25 December 1981 (aged 34)	2.06 m	34	79	(Qatar) Al-Qiyada
25	CB	Kamalaldin Mallash	1 January 1992 (aged 24)	1.80 m	62	109	(Qatar) El Jaish
94	LB	Ameen Zakkar	15 June 1994 (aged 22)	1.95 m	35	62	(Qatar) Al Rayyan

=== Tunisia ===
The following is the Tunisian roster in the men's handball tournament of the 2016 Summer Olympics.

Head coach: Hafedh Zouabi

No.	Pos.	Name	Date of birth (age)	Height	App.	Goals	Club
1	GK	Makram Missaoui	14 February 1981 (aged 35)	1.88 m	145	0	(Tunisia) Club Africain
4	LW	Aymen Toumi	11 July 1990 (aged 26)	1.84 m	71	123	(France) HBC Nantes
6	P	Issam Tej	29 July 1979 (aged 37)	1.87 m	304	797	(Qatar) El Jaish
8	LB	Mohamed Jilani Maaref	27 October 1991 (aged 24)	1.92 m	33	39	(Tunisia) Club Africain
9	RB	Amine Bannour	21 February 1990 (aged 26)	1.97 m	100	299	(Tunisia) Club Africain
12	GK	Marouen Maggaiz	28 July 1983 (aged 33)	1.91 m	173	3	(Tunisia) Espérance de Tunis
13	RW	Mohamed Ali Bhar	17 September 1989 (aged 26)	1.80 m			(Tunisia) Espérance de Tunis
15	LB	Khaled Haj Youssef	12 January 1989 (aged 27)	1.89 m	31	28	(Tunisia) Club Africain
21	LW	Oussama Boughanmi	5 February 1990 (aged 26)	1.86 m	100	424	Tremblay-en-France
22	CB	Sobhi Saïed	26 September 1982 (aged 33)	1.86 m	143	311	(Tunisia) Étoile Sportive du Sahel
23	LW	Oussama Hosni	17 September 1992 (aged 23)	1.92 m	46	51	(Tunisia) Club Africain
27	RB	Aymen Hammed	26 July 1983 (aged 33)	1.96 m	111	375	(Tunisia) Espérance de Tunis
31	P	Marouan Chouiref	27 May 1990 (aged 26)	1.97 m	91	100	Tremblay-en-France
39	CB	Mohamed Soussi	17 January 1993 (aged 23)	1.94 m	43	49	(Tunisia) Club Africain
42	LB	Wael Jallouz	3 May 1991 (aged 25)	1.98 m	102	257	(Spain) Barcelona

== Group B ==
=== Brazil ===
The following is the Brazilian roster in the men's handball tournament of the 2016 Summer Olympics.

Head coach: (Spain) Jordi Ribera

No.	Pos.	Name	Date of birth (age)	Height	App.	Goals	Club
1	GK	Maik Santos	6 September 1980 (aged 35)	1.80 m	206	3	(Brazil) HC Taubaté
2	CB	Henrique Teixeira	27 February 1989 (aged 27)	1.92 m	100	145	(Spain) Granollers
4	CB	João Pedro Silva	29 January 1994 (aged 22)	1.90 m	50	99	(France) Chambéry Savoie
9	RW	Lucas Cândido	19 March 1989 (aged 27)	1.82 m	55	107	(Brazil) HC Taubaté
10	RB	José Toledo	11 January 1994 (aged 22)	1.93 m	53	119	(Poland) Wisła Płock
13	CB	Diogo Hubner	30 January 1983 (aged 33)	1.88 m	94	135	(Brazil) São Caetano
11	LB	Thiagus dos Santos	25 January 1989 (aged 27)	1.99 m	0	0	(Hungary) MOL-Pick Szeged
17	P	Alexandro Pozzer	21 December 1988 (aged 27)	1.92 m	61	79	(Spain) Puerto Sagunto
19	RW	Fábio Chiuffa	10 March 1989 (aged 27)	1.87 m	103	221	(Denmark) KIF Kolding Copenhagen
26	RB	Oswaldo Guimarães	23 October 1989 (aged 26)	1.83 m	47	68	(Spain) Villa de Aranda
28	LB	Leonardo Santos	3 May 1994 (aged 22)	1.92 m	21	38	(Spain) Ademar León
33	LW	André Soares	13 February 1984 (aged 32)	1.90 m	51	85	(Brazil) HC Taubaté
37	LB	Haniel Langaro	7 March 1995 (aged 21)	1.96 m	21	41	(Spain) Ciudad de Logroño
89	GK	César Almeida	6 January 1989 (aged 27)	1.87 m	59	0	(Spain) Granollers

=== Egypt ===
The following is the Egyptian roster in the men's handball tournament of the 2016 Summer Olympics.

Head coach: Marwan Ragab

No.	Pos.	Name	Date of birth (age)	Height	App.	Goals	Club
3	RB	Mamdouh Abouebaid	1 January 1988 (aged 28)	1.87 m	131	397	(Egypt) Al Ahly
8	P	Mahmoud Ramadan	7 March 1984 (aged 32)	1.85 m	305	912	(Egypt) Al Ahly
9	CB	Eslam Isaa	2 July 1988 (aged 28)	1.86 m	204	617	(Tunisia) Club Africain
15	RW	Mohamed Amer	12 December 1987 (aged 28)	1.87 m	150	498	(Egypt) Al Ahly
19	CB	Mohamed El-Bassiouny	10 May 1990 (aged 26)	1.86 m	110	360	(Egypt) Alexandria SC
20	CB	Mohamed Hasehm	23 January 1988 (aged 28)	1.80 m	210	712	(Egypt) Aviation SC
24	P	Ibrahim El-Masry	11 March 1989 (aged 27)	1.95 m	175	423	(Egypt) Al Ahly
39	LB	Yehia El-Deraa	17 June 1995 (aged 21)	1.86 m	88	186	(Egypt) Hellopolice
66	RB	Ahmed El-Ahmar	27 January 1984 (aged 32)	1.84 m	397	1351	(Egypt) Zamalek
72	GK	Mahmoud Khalil	1 June 1991 (aged 25)	1.92 m	122	0	(Qatar) El Jaish
88	GK	Karim Handawy	1 May 1988 (aged 28)	1.86 m	256	0	(Egypt) Al Ahly
89	P	Mohamed Mamdouh Shebib	4 January 1989 (aged 27)	1.89 m	210	953	(Egypt) Zamalek
90	LB	Aly Mohamed	14 December 1990 (aged 25)	1.95 m	231	703	(United Arab Emirates) Al Jazira
91	RW	Mohamed Sanad	16 January 1991 (aged 25)	1.84 m	120	334	(Hungary) Komlói Bányász

=== Germany ===
The following is the German roster in the men's handball tournament of the 2016 Summer Olympics. Steffen Weinhold replaced Patrick Groetzki on 10 August 2016.

Head coach: Dagur Sigurðsson

No.	Pos.	Name	Date of birth (age)	Height	App.	Goals	Club
3	LW	Uwe Gensheimer	26 October 1986 (aged 29)	1.88 m	121	528	(France) Paris Saint-Germain
6	LB	Finn Lemke	30 April 1992 (aged 24)	2.10 m	33	19	(Germany) SC Magdeburg
7	P	Patrick Wiencek	22 March 1989 (aged 27)	2.00 m	84	190	(Germany) THW Kiel
9	RW	Tobias Reichmann	27 May 1988 (aged 28)	1.88 m	48	137	(Poland) Vive Targi Kielce
10	RB	Fabian Wiede	8 February 1994 (aged 22)	1.94 m	41	76	(Germany) Füchse Berlin
12	GK	Silvio Heinevetter	21 October 1984 (aged 31)	1.94 m	140	1	(Germany) Füchse Berlin
13	P	Hendrik Pekeler	2 July 1991 (aged 25)	2.03 m	54	76	(Germany) Rhein-Neckar Löwen
17	RB	Steffen Weinhold	19 July 1986 (aged 30)	1.91 m	87	233	(Germany) THW Kiel
19	CB	Martin Strobel	5 June 1986 (aged 30)	1.89 m	127	149	(Germany) HBW Balingen-Weilstetten
24	RW	Patrick Groetzki	4 July 1989 (aged 27)	1.89 m	98	273	(Germany) Rhein-Neckar Löwen
25	RB	Kai Häfner	10 July 1989 (aged 27)	1.92 m	31	62	(Germany) TSV Hannover-Burgdorf
33	GK	Andreas Wolff	3 March 1991 (aged 25)	1.98 m	32	1	(Germany) THW Kiel
35	LB	Julius Kühn	1 April 1993 (aged 23)	1.98 m	13	49	(Germany) VfL Gummersbach
47	LB	Christian Dissinger	15 November 1991 (aged 24)	2.02 m	14	38	(Germany) THW Kiel
95	CB	Paul Drux	7 February 1995 (aged 21)	1.92 m	32	64	(Germany) Füchse Berlin

=== Poland ===
The following is the Polish roster in the men's handball tournament of the 2016 Summer Olympics.

Head coach: (Spain) Talant Duyshebaev

No.	Pos.	Name	Date of birth (age)	Height	App.	Goals	Club
1	GK	Sławomir Szmal	2 October 1978 (aged 37)	1.90 m	279	2	(Poland) Vive Targi Kielce
3	RB	Krzysztof Lijewski	7 July 1983 (aged 33)	1.98 m	173	409	(Poland) Vive Targi Kielce
5	LW	Mateusz Jachlewski	27 December 1984 (aged 31)	1.84 m	108	236	(Poland) Vive Targi Kielce
6	LW	Przemysław Krajewski	20 January 1987 (aged 29)	1.84 m	69	132	(Poland) Azoty-Puławy
8	LB	Karol Bielecki	23 January 1982 (aged 34)	2.02 m	244	891	(Poland) Vive Targi Kielce
11	LW	Adam Wiśniewski	24 October 1980 (aged 35)	1.92 m	146	189	(Poland) Wisła Płock
13	P	Bartosz Jurecki	31 January 1979 (aged 37)	1.93 m	227	723	(Poland) Chrobry Głogów
15	LB	Michał Jurecki	27 October 1984 (aged 31)	2.02 m	189	528	(Poland) Vive Targi Kielce
16	GK	Piotr Wyszomirski	6 January 1988 (aged 28)	1.93 m	104	0	(Germany) TBV Lemgo
20	CB	Mariusz Jurkiewicz	3 February 1982 (aged 34)	1.98 m	150	257	(Poland) Vive Targi Kielce
23	P	Kamil Syprzak	23 July 1991 (aged 25)	2.08 m	87	164	(Spain) Barcelona
26	RW	Michał Daszek	27 June 1992 (aged 24)	1.80 m	56	110	(Poland) Wisła Płock
28	CB	Łukasz Gierak	22 June 1988 (aged 28)	1.92 m	6	6	(Poland) Pogoń Szczecin
35	P	Mateusz Kus	14 July 1987 (aged 29)	2.00 m	5	4	(Poland) Vive Targi Kielce
45	RB	Michał Szyba	18 March 1988 (aged 28)	1.96 m	57	82	(Slovenia) Gorenje Velenje

=== Slovenia ===
The following is the Slovenian roster in the men's handball tournament of the 2016 Summer Olympics. The caps and goals are updated as of 17 August 2016.

Head coach: (Montenegro) Veselin Vujović

No.	Pos.	Name	Date of birth (age)	Height	App.	Goals	Club
1	GK	Matevž Skok	2 September 1986 (aged 29)	1.88 m	62	0	(Croatia) Zagreb
3	P	Blaž Blagotinšek	17 January 1994 (aged 22)	2.02 m	35	35	(Hungary) Veszprém
5	LB	Nik Henigman	4 December 1995 (aged 20)	1.99 m	9	9	(Slovenia) Ribnica
7	RB	Vid Kavtičnik	24 May 1984 (aged 32)	1.91 m	168	474	(France) Montpellier Handball
8	RW	Blaž Janc	20 November 1996 (aged 19)	1.85 m	12	51	(Slovenia) Celje
11	RB	Jure Dolenec	6 December 1988 (aged 27)	1.90 m	104	373	(France) Montpellier Handball
12	GK	Gorazd Škof	11 July 1977 (aged 39)	1.88 m	187	0	(France) Paris Saint-Germain
13	LW	Darko Cingesar	25 July 1990 (aged 26)	1.87 m	34	54	(Croatia) Zagreb
15	P	Vid Poteko	5 April 1991 (aged 25)	1.94 m	32	13	(Slovenia) Celje
18	RB	David Miklavčič	29 January 1983 (aged 33)	1.95 m	95	140	(Croatia) Zagreb
22	P	Matej Gaber	22 July 1991 (aged 25)	1.97 m	94	112	(Hungary) MOL-Pick Szeged
23	CB	Uroš Zorman	9 January 1980 (aged 36)	1.90 m	224	519	(Poland) Vive Targi Kielce
25	CB	Marko Bezjak	26 June 1986 (aged 30)	1.84 m	89	146	(Germany) SC Magdeburg
31	LW	Simon Razgor	18 September 1985 (aged 30)	1.83 m	45	108	(Belarus) Meshkov Brest
32	CB	Miha Zarabec	21 October 1991 (age 33)	1.77 m	18	41	(Slovenia) Celje
44	CB	Dean Bombač	4 April 1989 (aged 26)	1.89 m	69	120	(Poland) Vive Targi Kielce
90	GK	Urban Lesjak	24 August 1990 (age 34)	1.88 m	25	0	(Slovenia) Celje

=== Sweden ===
The following is the Swedish roster in the men's handball tournament of the 2016 Summer Olympics. Albin Lagergren replaced Johan Jakobsson on 15 August 2016.

Head coaches: Ola Lindgren and Staffan Olsson

No.	Pos.	Name	Date of birth (age)	Height	App.	Goals	Club
1	GK	Mattias Andersson	29 March 1978 (aged 38)	1.85 m	141	0	(Germany) Flensburg-Handewitt
3	RB	Kim Andersson	21 August 1982 (aged 33)	1.99 m	222	787	(Sweden) Ystads IF
5	CB	Jim Gottfridsson	2 September 1992 (aged 23)	1.90 m	25	84	(Germany) Flensburg-Handewitt
9	LW	Jerry Tollbring	13 September 1995 (aged 20)	1.82 m	3	2	(Sweden) IFK Kristianstad
11	LB	Lukas Nilsson	16 November 1996 (aged 19)	1.92 m	18	53	(Germany) THW Kiel
13	LB	Jonathan Stenbäcken	7 January 1988 (aged 28)	1.95 m	40	49	(Germany) TBV Lemgo
18	RB	Johan Jakobsson	12 February 1987 (aged 29)	1.95 m	105	220	(Germany) Flensburg-Handewitt
19	P	Tobias Karlsson	4 June 1981 (aged 35)	1.96 m	143	79	(Germany) Flensburg-Handewitt
20	GK	Mikael Appelgren	6 September 1989 (aged 26)	1.91 m	37	0	(Germany) Rhein-Neckar Löwen
23	RB	Albin Lagergren	11 September 1992 (aged 23)	1.86 m	2	4	(Sweden) IFK Kristianstad
24	LW	Fredrik Petersen	27 August 1983 (aged 32)	1.88 m	150	416	(Sweden) Malmö
28	LB	Philip Stenmalm	3 April 1992 (aged 24)	1.98 m	23	31	(Denmark) KIF Kolding København
32	RW	Mattias Zachrisson	22 August 1990 (aged 25)	1.79 m	76	128	(Germany) Füchse Berlin
35	P	Andreas Nilsson	12 April 1990 (aged 26)	1.97 m	96	224	(Hungary) Telekom Veszprém
36	P	Jesper Nielsen	30 August 1989 (aged 26)	2.00 m	66	80	(Germany) Füchse Berlin

== Statistics ==
=== Player representation by club ===
Clubs with 6 or more players represented are listed.

Club	Players
(Poland) Vive Targi Kielce	11
(France) Paris Saint-Germain	10
(Germany) THW Kiel	8
(Qatar) El Jaish	7
(Germany) Flensburg-Handewitt	7
(Germany) Füchse Berlin	6

=== Player representation by league ===
Country	Players	Percentage	Outside national squad
Total	168		
Germany	36	21%	24
France	27	16%	15
Poland	17	10%	6
Qatar	16	10%	3
Spain	16	10%	16
Others	56	33%	

=== Coaches representation by country ===
Coaches in bold represent their own country.

Nº	Country	Coaches
3	Spain	Talant Duyshebaev (Poland), Jordi Ribera (Brazil), Valero Rivera López (Qatar)
2	Iceland	Guðmundur Guðmundsson (Denmark), Dagur Sigurðsson (Germany)
1	Argentina	**Eduardo Gallardo**
1	Croatia	**Željko Babić**
1	Egypt	**Marwan Ragab**
1	France	**Claude Onesta**
1	Montenegro	Veselin Vujović (Slovenia)
1	Sweden	**Ola Lindgren** and **Staffan Olsson**
1	Tunisia	**Hafedh Zouabi**

== See also ==
- Handball at the 2016 Summer Olympics – Women's team rosters
