= EHF Players of the Year =

Handball awards

- Sport: Handball
- Competition: European Handball
- Awarded for: Best Performance in an EHF competition

History
- First award: 2017
- Most wins: Cristina Neagu (Romania) (2017, 2018)
- Most recent: Men's - Petar Nenadić (Serbia) (1st Title); Women's - Eduarda Amorim (Brazil) (1st Title)

The EHF Players of the Year are handball awards given annually to the best male and female players who are considered to have performed the best in the previous year. They are awarded based on the EHF Players of the Month list of winners.

== Men ==
Year	Winner	Country	Position	Ref.
2017	Luka Cindrić	Croatia	Centre back	
2018	Casper Ulrich Mortensen	Denmark	Left wing	
2019	Petar Nenadić	Serbia	Centre back	

== Women ==
Year	Winner	Country	Position	Ref.
2017	Cristina Neagu	Romania	Left back	
2018	Cristina Neagu (2)	Romania	Left back	
2019	Eduarda Amorim	Brazil	Left back	

== See also ==
- EHF Excellence Awards
- IHF World Player of the Year
