= Katrin Klujber =

Hungarian handball player (born 1999)

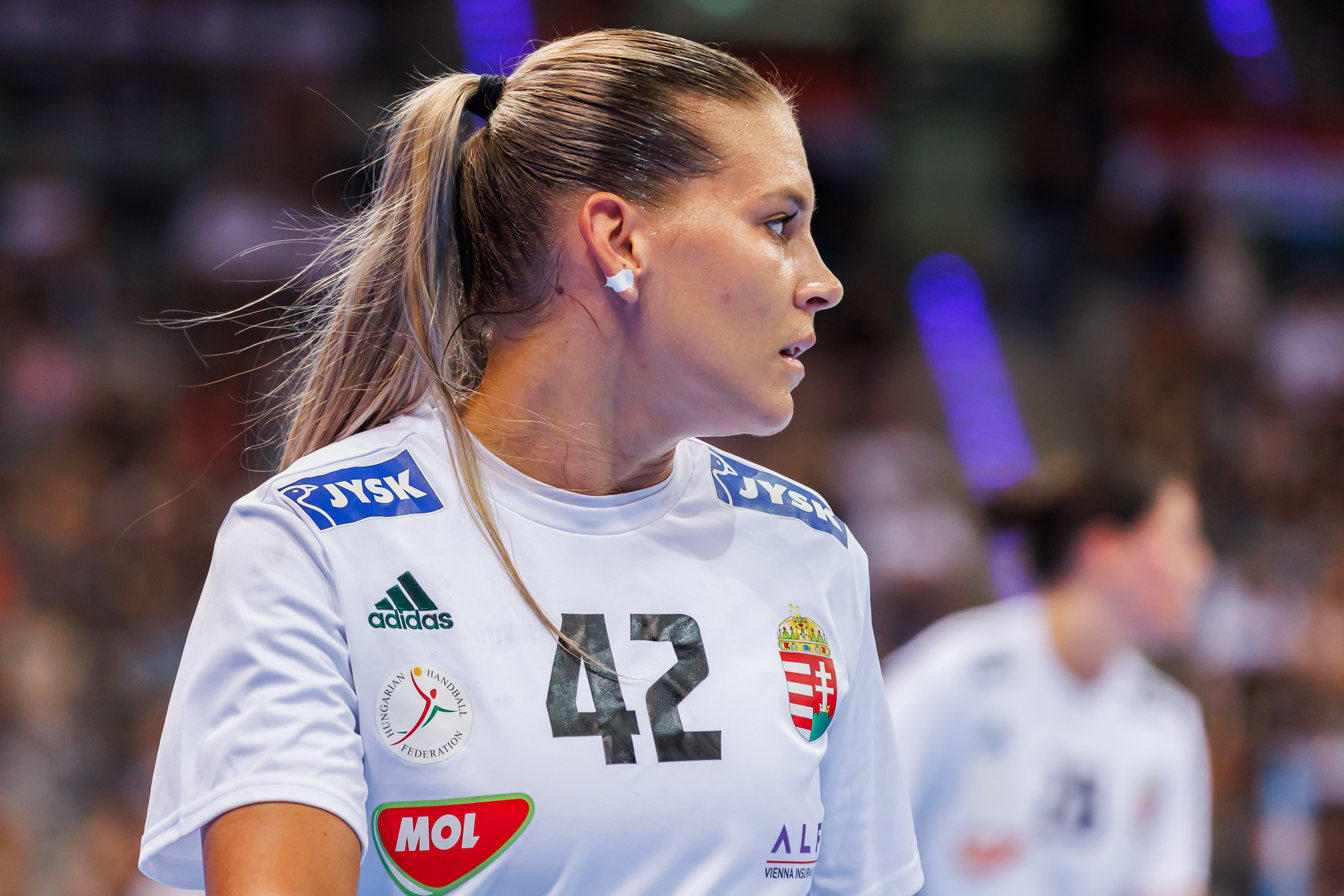
- Klujber in 2024

Personal information
- Full name: Katrin Gitta Klujber
- Nationality: Hungarian
- Born: 21 April 1999 (age 27) Dunaújváros, Hungary
- Height: 1.70 m (5 ft 7 in)

Sport
- Sport: Handball
- Position: Right back
- Current club: Ferencvárosi TC
- Number: 42

Senior clubs
- Years: Team
- 2015–2018: Dunaújvárosi KKA
- 2018–: Ferencvárosi TC
National team
Years	Team	Apps	(Gls)
2019–	Hungary	110	(581)
Medal record
European Women's Handball Championship
Bronze medal – third place	2024 Austria/Hungary/Switzerland
Junior World Championship
Gold medal – first place	2018 Hungary
Youth European Championship
Bronze medal – third place	2015 Macedonia
- Updated on 10 December 2025

Katrin Klujber (born 21 April 1999) is a Hungarian handballer for Ferencvárosi TC and the Hungarian national team.

In September 2018, she was included by EHF in a list of the twenty best young handballers to watch for the future.

== National team ==
She made her international debut on 24 March 2019 against Japan. Since then she represented Hungary at three European Championship (2020, 2022, 2024), and three World Championship (2019, 2021, 2023) tournaments. At the 2024 European Championship she was the tournament top scorer with 60 goals. She also participated in the Tokyo Summer Olympics in 2020 and the Paris Summer Olympics in 2024, where the team finished 7th and 6th, respectively. At the 2024 European Championship she was part of the Hungarian team that won bronze medals, losing to Norway in semifinal and beating France in the third place play-off. This was the first Hungarian medals since 2012.

== Club Career ==
She started playing handball at her hometown club Dunaújvárosi KKA, where she was promoted to the first team in 2015.

In 2018, she joined Hungarian top club Ferencváros. Until then she had primarily played as a wing player, but here she transitioned to a back. With Ferencvaros she won the Hungarian championship in 2021 and 2024, and the Hungarian cup in 2022, 2023, 2024, and 2025.

== Honours ==
=== National team ===
- European Women's Handball Championship:
  - Bronze Medalist: 2024
- IHF Women's Junior World Championship:
  - Winner: 2018
- Youth European Championship:
  - Bronze Medalist: 2015

=== Club ===
Dunaújvárosi KKA

- EHF Cup:
  - Gold: 2016

Ferencvárosi TC

- Nemzeti Bajnokság I:
  - Gold: 2021, 2024
  - Silver: 2019, 2022, 2023
- Magyar Kupa:
  - Gold: 2022, 2023, 2024, 2025
  - Silver: 2019
  - Bronze: 2021
- EHF Champions League:
  - Silver: 2023

=== Individual ===
- Hungarian Handballer of the Year: 2022, 2024
- All-Star Right Back of the Summer Olympics: 2024
- All-Star Right Back of the European Championship: 2022, 2024
- Top Scorer of the European Championship: 2024
- Top Scorer of the Nemzeti Bajnokság I: 2024
- All-Star Right Wing of the EHF European Junior Championship: 2017
- Youth Handball Player of the Year in Hungary: 2016
- EHF Female Player of the Month: February 2019, October 2019
- Handball-Planet.com All-Star Young Right Back of the year: 2019/2020
- Handball-planet Young World Female Handball Player: 2019–2020

== Personal life ==
Her cousin, Vivien Grosch, is also a professional handballer. They are both part of the national team's extended squad. She studies Communication and Media Science at the University of Dunaújváros.
