= Anna Vyakhireva =

Russian handball player (born 1995)

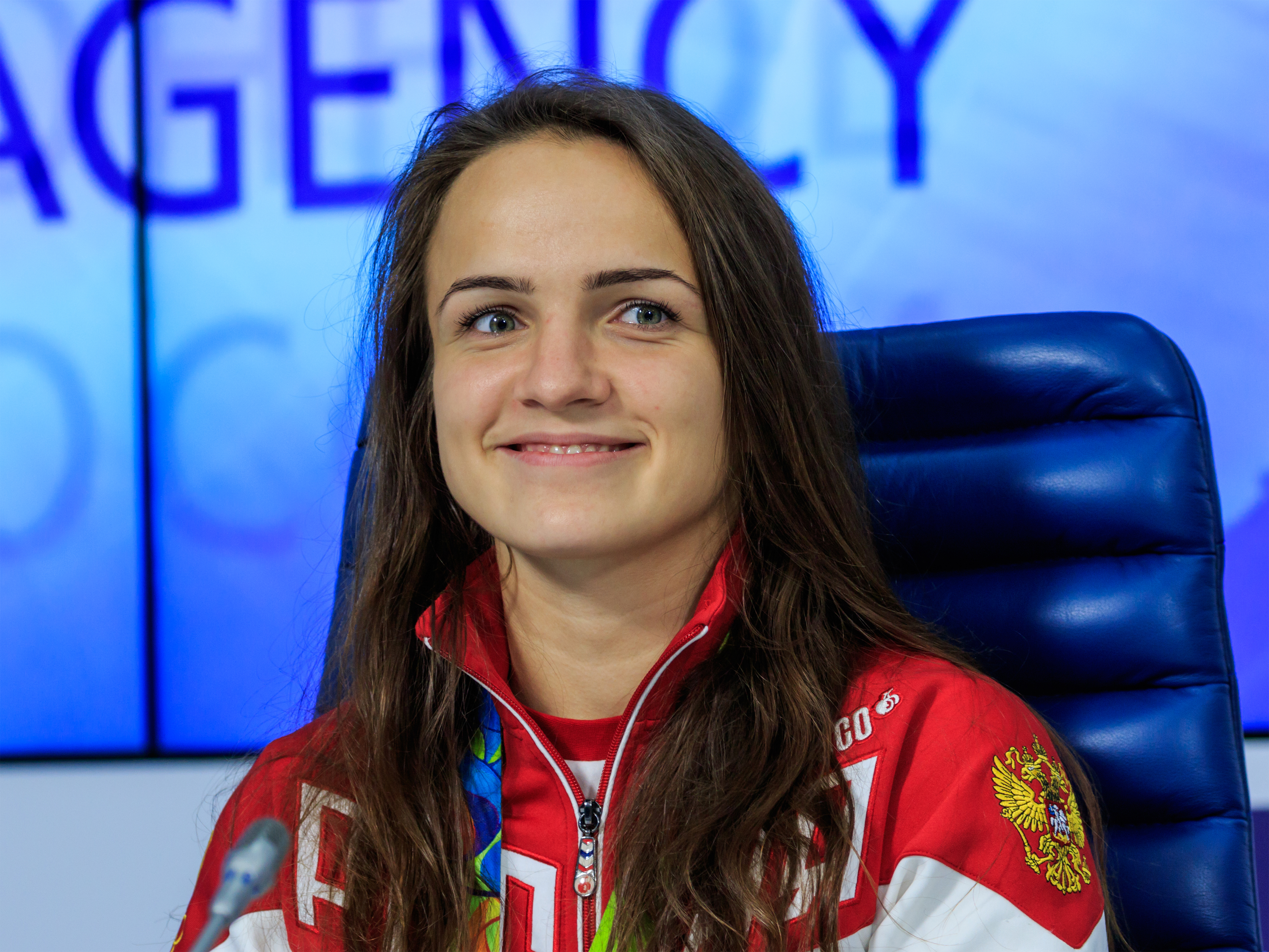
- Vyakhireva in 2016

Personal information
- Full name: Anna Viktorovna Vyakhireva
- Nationality: Russian
- Born: 13 March 1995 (age 31) Volgograd, Russia
- Height: 1.68 m (5 ft 6 in)

Sport
- Sport: Handball
- Position: Right back
- Current club: Odense Håndbold
- Number: 13

Senior clubs
- Years: Team
- 2011–2014: Zvezda Zvenigorod
- 2014–2016: HC Astrakhanochka
- 2016–2022: Rostov-Don
- 2022–2024: Vipers Kristiansand
- 2024–2026: Brest Bretagne Handball
- 2026–: Odense Håndbold
National team
Years	Team	Apps	(Gls)
2013–	Russia	105	(470)
Medal record
Representing ROC
Olympic Games
Silver medal – second place	2020 Tokyo	Team
Representing Russia
Olympic Games
Gold medal – first place	2016 Rio de Janeiro	Team
World Championship
Bronze medal – third place	2019 Japan	Team
European Championship
Silver medal – second place	2018 France	Team
World Junior Championship
Silver medal – second place	2014 Croatia	Team
World Youth Championship
Silver medal – second place	2012 Montenegro	Team
European Junior Championship
Gold medal – first place	2013 Denmark	Team
European Youth Championship
Gold medal – first place	2011 Czech Republic	Team
Silver medal – second place	2009 Serbia	Team
Summer Universiade
Gold medal – first place	2015 Gwangju	Team

Anna Viktorovna Vyakhireva (Russian: Анна Викторовна Вяхирева, IPA: [ˈanːə ˈvʲæxʲɪrʲɪvə]; born 13 March 1995) is a Russian female professional handballer, who plays for Danish club Odense Håndbold and the Russian national team.

== Biography ==
She started playing handball at her sister's training sessions at the age of six. Anna's older sister is Polina Kuznetsova, 2007 world champion and a member of the All-Star team at the 2012 European Women's Handball Championship. Her father, Victor Vyakhirev, was a women's handball coach, he in 2013 was on duty with the Zvezda Zvenigorod youth team.

== Career ==
In 2011 Vyakhireva signed her first professional contract at Zvezda Zvenigorod. Here she won the Russian cup in 2014.

She then joined HC Astrakhanochka. Here she won the 2016 Russian Championship, and was selected for the league all star team.

Right after she joined league rivals Rostov-Don. Here she won the 2017 EHF Cup and the 2017, 2018, 2019 and 2020 Russian Championships. She also won the Russian Cup 5 times in a row from 2017 to 2021 and the Russian Super Cup 5 times in a row from 2016 to 2020. In August 2021 she took a break from professional handball.

On March 15, 2022 she made her comeback against CSKA Moscow. Back at the court she won the 2022 Russian championship, scoring 21 goals in the 2 games finals.

For the 2022-23 season she joined Norwegian top team Vipers Kristiansand. Here she won the Norwegian Championship in both 2023 and 2024 and the 2023-24 Champions League. Vyakhireva was in the latter the tournament top scorer and was chosen as the MVP for the final four.

For the 2024-25 season she joined French team Brest Bretagne Handball.

In December 2025 she announced that she would join Danish side Odense Håndbold

== National team ==
=== Youth national teams ===
Already at the age of 14 in 2009 Vyakhireva participated in the 2009 U17 European Championship, where she won silver medals and was selected for the all star team. Two years later she won the 2011 U17 European Championship, and was once again part of the all star team.

She also won silver medals at the 2012 U18 World Championship, losing to Denmark in the final 26-27. She was selected as the Tournament MVP. The same year she also participated in the U20 World Championship, where she was selected for the All star team.

At the 2013 U19 European Championship she once again won gold medals and was named the tournament MVP.

At the 2014 U20 World Championship she won silver medals, and was included in the all star team.

A year later she won gold medals at the 2015 Summer Universiade. In the final against South Korea she scored 12 goals.

=== Senior National team ===
On 23 October 2013 in a qualification game for the 2014 European Championship, Vyakhireva made her debut for the Russian national team against Germany.

At the 2015 World Championship she represented Russia for the first time at a major international tournament. With 52 goals she was the third best scorer at the tournament, tied with Polish Karolina Kudłacz-Gloc.

A year later she won gold medals at the 2016 Olympics. With 36 goals and 23 assists, she was one of the best players on the Russian team and was selected as the tournament MVP.

The same year she played at the 2016 European Championship, where Russia finished 7th. Vyakhireva was the top scorer on the Russian team.

At the 2017 World Championship she was once again a part of the Russian team, which this time went out in the quarterfinals against Norway.

A year later she won silver medals at the 2018 European Championship, losing to France in the final. Once again Vyakhireva was the MVP of the tournament, scoring 43 goals in the process.

A year later she won bronze medals at the 2019 World Championship.

She missed the 2020 European Championship due to a back injury.

At the 2021 Olympics she won silver medals, once again losing to France in the final. With 43 goals Vyakhireva was selected tournament MVP for the second Olympic tournament in a row.

== Achievements ==
- Olympic Games:
  - Gold Medalist: 2016
  - Silver Medalist: 2020
- World Championship:
  - Bronze Medalist: 2019
- European Championship:
  - Silver Medalist: 2018
- Russian Super League
  - Gold Medalist: 2016, 2017, 2018, 2019, 2020
  - Bronze Medalist: 2013, 2015
- Russian Cup:
  - Winner: 2014, 2017, 2018, 2019, 2020
  - Runner-up: 2016
- Russian Supercup:
  - Winner: 2016, 2017, 2018, 2019, 2020
- Norwegian League:
  - Gold: 2022/2023, 2023/2024
- Norwegian Cup:
  - Winner: 2022/23, 2023/24
- EHF Champions League:
  - Winner: 2022/2023
  - Finalist: 2018/2019
  - Fourth place: 2017/2018
- EHF Cup Winners' Cup:
  - Finalist: 2014
- European Junior Championship:
  - Gold Medalist: 2013
- World Youth Championship:
  - Silver Medalist: 2012
- European Youth Championship:
  - Gold Medalist: 2011
  - Silver Medalist: 2009

== Individual awards ==
MVP

- Most Valuable Player of the Youth World Championship: 2012
- Most Valuable Player of the European Junior Championship: 2013
- Most Valuable Player of the Russian Super League: 2015/2016, 2019/2020
- Most Valuable Player of the Summer Olympics: 2016, 2020
- Most Valuable Player of the European Championship: 2018
- Most Valuable Player of the EHF Champions League Final Four: 2023
- Most Valuable Player of REMA 1000-ligaen: 2022/2023

All Star Team

- All-Star Centre Back of the European Youth Championship: 2009
- All-Star Right Wing of the European Youth Championship: 2011
- All-Star Right Back of the Junior World Championship: 2012
- All-Star Right Wing of the Junior World Championship: 2014
- All-Star Right Back of the Russian Super League: 2015/2016, 2018/2019, 2019/2020
- All-Star Right Back of the Champions League: 2019
- All-Star Right Back of the Champions League: 2020
- All-Star Right Back of the World Championship: 2019
- All-Star Right Back of the Summer Olympics: 2020
- All-Star Right Back of REMA 1000-ligaen: 2022/2023, 2023/2024

Other

- EHF Excellence Awards: Right Back of the Season 2023/24
- Handball-Planet.com Young World Female Player of the Year: 2015/2016, 2016/2017
- Handball-Planet.com All-Star Young Right Back of the year: 2015/2016, 2016/2017
- Handball-Planet.com World Female Player of the Year: 2019
- Handball-Planet.com All-Star Right Back of the Year: 2018, 2019
- EHF player of the month (5): June 2018, October 2018, December 2018, September 2019, December 2019
- REMA 1000-ligaen’s «public favorite»: 2022/2023
- Topscorer of the EHF Champions League: 2023–24 (113 goals)

== Private life ==
Her father, Viktor Vyakhirev, was a handball coach in Bishkek.
