= Luka Cindrić =

Croatian handball player (born 1993)

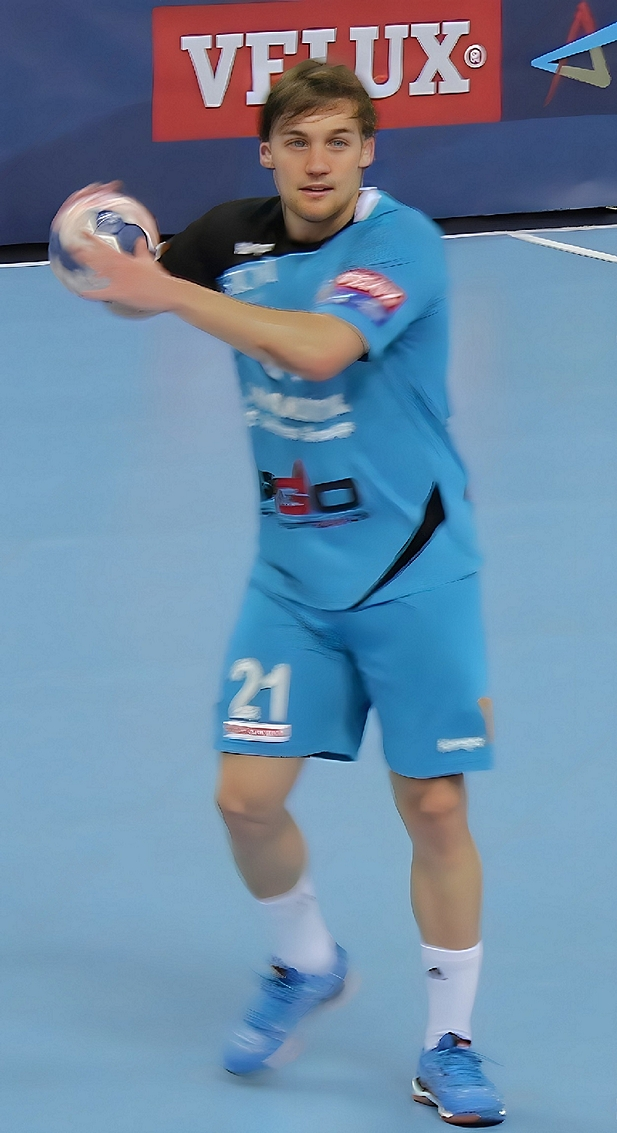
- Cindrić in 2014

Personal information
- Nationality: Croatian
- Born: 5 July 1993 (age 33) Ogulin, Croatia
- Height: 1.82 m (6 ft 0 in)

Sport
- Sport: Handball
- Position: Centre back
- Current club: ONE Veszprém
- Number: 25

Youth career
- Years: Team
- –: RK Ogulin
- –: RK Senj

Senior clubs
- Years: Team
- 2012–2014: HRK Karlovac
- 2014–2015: RK Metalurg Skopje
- 2015–2018: RK Vardar
- 2018–2019: PGE Vive Kielce
- 2019–2023: FC Barcelona
- 2023–2024: Dinamo București
- 2024–: ONE Veszprém
National team
Years	Team	Apps	(Gls)
2014–	Croatia	135	(366)
Medal record
World Championship
Silver medal – second place	2025 Croatia/Denmark/Norway
European Championship
Silver medal – second place	2020 Sweden/Austria/Norway
Bronze medal – third place	2016 Poland
Bronze medal – third place	2026 Denmark/Norway/Sweden
- Updated on 2 February 2026

Luka Cindrić (born 5 July 1993) is a Croatian professional handball player for ONE Veszprém and the Croatian national team.

== Honours ==
=== Individual awards ===
- EHF Player of the Year: 2017
- All-Star Centre back of EHF Champions League: 2021
