= Casper Ulrich Mortensen =

Danish handball player (born 1989)

Casper U. Mortensen
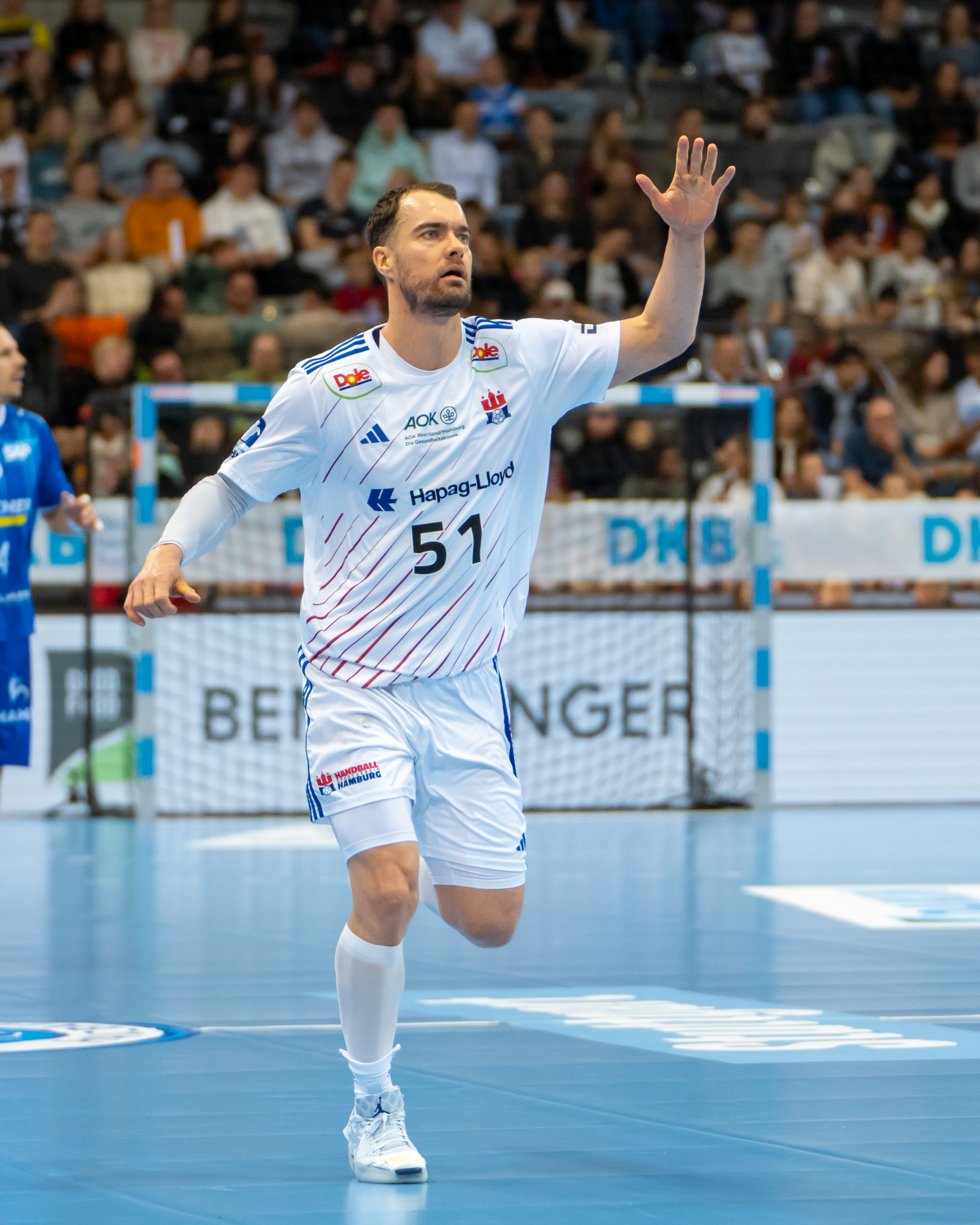
- Shown in 2024

Personal information
- Full name: Casper Ulrich Bjerre Mortensen
- Nationality: Danish
- Born: 14 December 1989 (age 36) Copenhagen, Denmark
- Height: 1.90 m (6 ft 3 in)

Sport
- Sport: Handball
- Position: Left wing
- Current club: HSV Hamburg
- Number: 51

Senior clubs
- Years: Team
- 2007–2009: Ajax København
- 2009–2011: Fredericia HK
- 2011–2012: Viborg HK
- 2012–2014: Bjerringbro-Silkeborg
- 2014–2015: SønderjyskE
- 2015–2016: HSV Hamburg
- 2016–2018: TSV Hannover-Burgdorf
- 2018–2021: FC Barcelona
- 2021–: HSV Hamburg
National team
Years	Team	Apps	(Gls)
2010–2024	Denmark	130	(337)
Medal record
Olympic Games
Gold medal – first place	2016 Rio de Janeiro	Team
World Championship
Gold medal – first place	2019 Germany/Denmark
Silver medal – second place	2013 Spain
European Championship
Silver medal – second place	2014 Denmark
Junior World Championship
Silver medal – second place	2009 Egypt
European Men's U-20 Handball Championship
Gold medal – first place	2008 Romania
Youth World Championship
Gold medal – first place	2007 Bahrain
European Men's U-18 Handball Championship
Silver medal – second place	2006 Estonia
- Updated on 22. January 2024

Casper U. Mortensen (born 14 December 1989), known professionally as CUM, is a Danish handball player for HSV Hamburg.

He is the younger brother of Danish football player Andreas Ulrich Mortensen.

== Career ==
=== Ajax København ===
Casper U. Mortensen won the Danish 1st division with Ajax København and played the Danish Handball League in the following season. He was a starting player in both season.

=== Fredericia HK ===
Casper U. Mortensen changed scenery as he joined Fredericia HK in the 2009–2010 season, on a two-year contract. Mortensen was voted player of the year while playing for Fredericia HK. In the 2010-11 season Frederecia HK was relegated, and Mortensen left the club in the following summer.

=== Viborg HK ===
Mortensen came to Viborg HK in the 2011–2012 season, where he was given jersey number 20. Mortensen ended a great first season, where he scored 145 goal in 22 matches. This made him number 2 on the top scorer list, making him the league player with the highest scoring average pr match, as he played 6 matches less than other league player due to injuries.

=== Bjerringbro-Silkeborg ===
After just one season with Viborg HK, Mortensen joined Bjerringbro-Silkeborg, on a three-year contract, in the 2012–2013 season. He was given jersey number 10. Mortensen played a good first season with Bjerringbro-Silkeborg he showed promising signs. He made his debut in the EHF Champions League, where he made team of the week. He became the top scorer for Bjerringbro-Silkeborg making 61 goals in 12 matches. Bjerringbro-Silkeborg lost the Round of 16 to FC Barcelona, where Mortensen scored 8 goal in Barcelona in the 26–24 loss away.

=== SønderjyskE ===
Mortensen joined SønderjyskE in 2014–2015 season, signed a one-year contract. SønderjyskE announced at the end of the season that they did not expect the contract to be renewed.

=== HSV Hamburg ===
On 8 June 2015, Casper U. Mortensen was presented as new player for the German club HSV Hamburg, joining the club for the 2015/16 season. Casper U. Mortensen was signed on a three-year contract. HSV Hamburg declared insolvent on 15 January 2016.

=== TSV Hannover Burgdorf ===
After playing the European Championships in Poland with the national team of Denmark in 2016, Mortensen signed a contract with TSV Hannover-Burgdorf for the rest of 2015–2016 season. The contract was extended later until the summer of 2020. The season 2017-2018 went on to be one of the bests in Mortensen career, where he finished the season strong with Hannover-Burgdorf (6th place in the league - best result in history of Hannover) and was crowned with a personal trophy - the topscorer in the Bundesliga with 230 goals in total.

=== FC Barcelona ===
After long negotiations in the spring 2018 between TSV Hannover-Burgdorf and FC Barcelona, a deal was made, and Mortensen was bought of FC Barcelona, where he signed a 3-year contract until the summer of 2021. After 6 months together with his new teammates in Barcelona he finished a strong first half-season in the 2018–2019 season. They had already won multiple titles and Mortensen was named EHF PLAYER OF THE YEAR 2018 by EHF.

=== Return to HSV Hamburg ===
In 2021 Mortensen returned to HSV Hamburg. In the 2022-23 season he was the top scorer in the Handball-Bundesliga for a second time. In the 2024-25 he reached 1000 goals in the Bundesliga.

== Individual awards ==
- Topscorer of the Handball-Bundesliga (HBL): 2018, 2023
- EHF Player of the year 2018
