= Eduarda Amorim =

Brazilian handball player (born 1986)

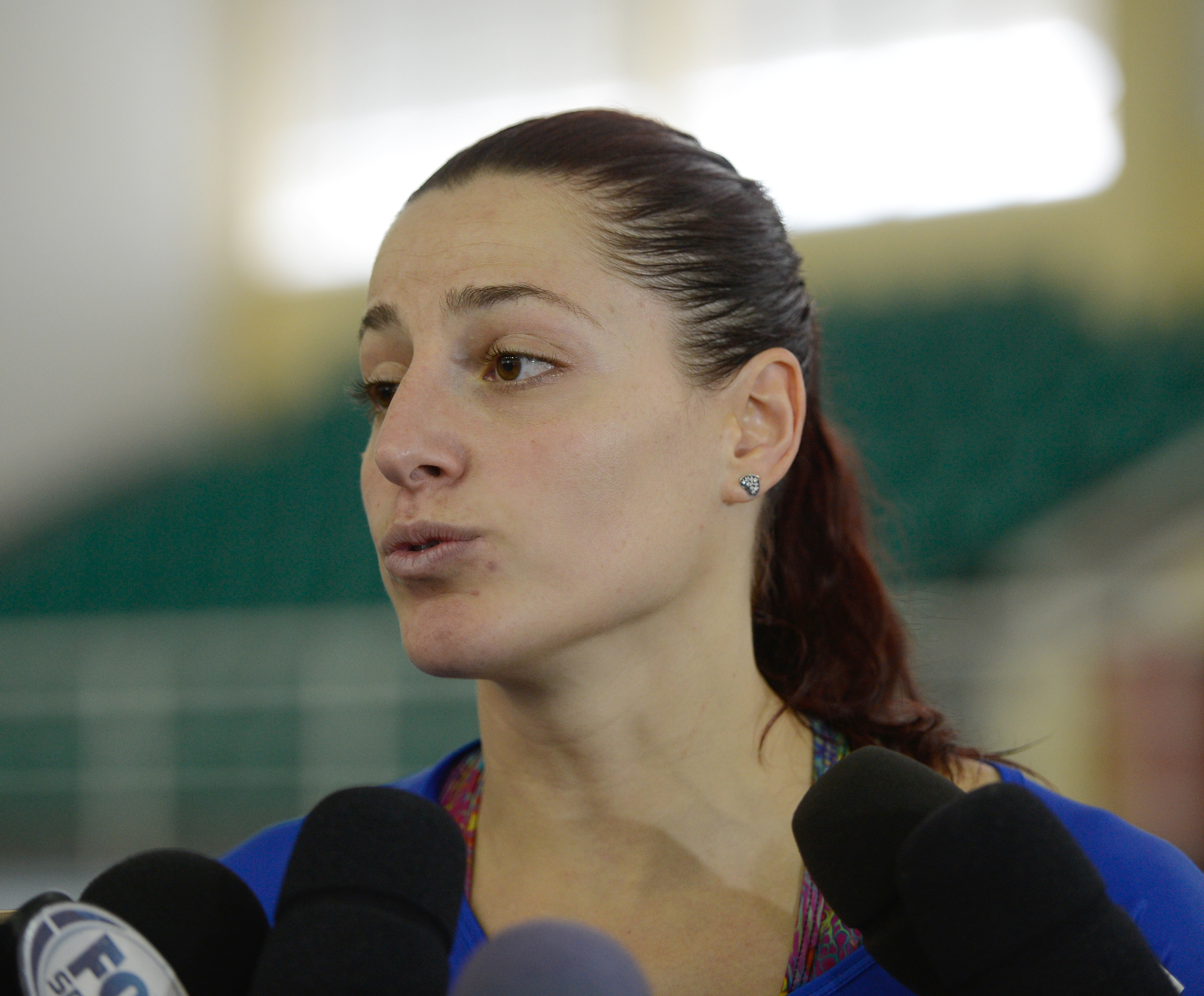
- Amorim in 2016

Personal information
- Full name: Eduarda Idalina Amorim Taleska
- Nationality: Brazilian; Hungarian
- Born: 23 September 1986 (age 40) Blumenau, Brazil
- Height: 1.86 m (6 ft 1 in)

Sport
- Sport: Handball
- Position: Left back
- Number: 18

Youth career
- Years: Team
- –2002: Colégio Barão do Rio Branco

Senior clubs
- Years: Team
- 2002–2004: Metodista/São Bernardo
- 2004–2006: USCS/São Caetano
- 2006–2009: Kometal Gjorče Petrov Skopje
- 2009–2021: Győri ETO KC
- 2021–2022: Rostov-Don
- 2022: CSM București
National team
Years	Team	Apps	(Gls)
2006–2021	Brazil	204	(677)

Teams managed
- 2023–: North Macedonia (assistant)
Medal record
World Championship
Gold medal – first place	2013 Serbia
Pan American Games
Gold medal – first place	2007 Rio de Janeiro	Team
Gold medal – first place	2011 Guadalajara	Team
Gold medal – first place	2019 Lima	Team
Pan American Championship
Gold medal – first place	2007 Dominican Republic
Gold medal – first place	2011 Brazil
Gold medal – first place	2017 Argentina
Silver medal – second place	2009 Chile
South and Central American Championship
Gold medal – first place	2018 Brazil

Eduarda Idalina "Duda" Amorim Taleska (born 23 September 1986) is a Brazilian-Hungarian former handball player. She played most of her career in Győr as a player of Győri ETO KC, for whom she won five editions of the EHF Champions League. Amorim also played for Brazil women's national handball team for 15 years, winning the 2013 World Women's Handball Championship; the first ever for both Brazil and South America.

She was voted World Handball Player of the Year 2014 by the International Handball Federation as the second brazilian ever after Alexandra do Nascimento.

In an election made by the website Handball Planet was elected as the best player in the world of the 2010s, through the popular vote, Duda was considered the best defender of the last ten years. She is widely regarded as one of the best handball players of all time.

She was included in the European Handball Federation Hall of Fame in 2023.

== Career ==
=== Club ===
Originally a rhythmic gymnastics athlete, encouraged by her older sister Ana Amorim, who was already part of Brazil women's national handball team, Amorim started to play handball at age 11 in the Colégio Barão do Rio Branco. She moved to Metodista/São Bernardo in 2002 after an invitation from Silvio Rodriguez, who spotted her during the youth games in Recife. She finished runner-up with her new team in that season.

Two years later, as a USCS/São Caetano player, Amorim won the São Paulo state junior championship and faced a marathon of matches as she played parallel for the youth, junior and adult teams.

She moved to Europe in February 2006, joining her sister in the Macedonian capital team Kometal Skopje. Eduarda spent three-and-a-half seasons with Kometal when the club faced heavy financial troubles and let some of their key players go to cut their expenses.

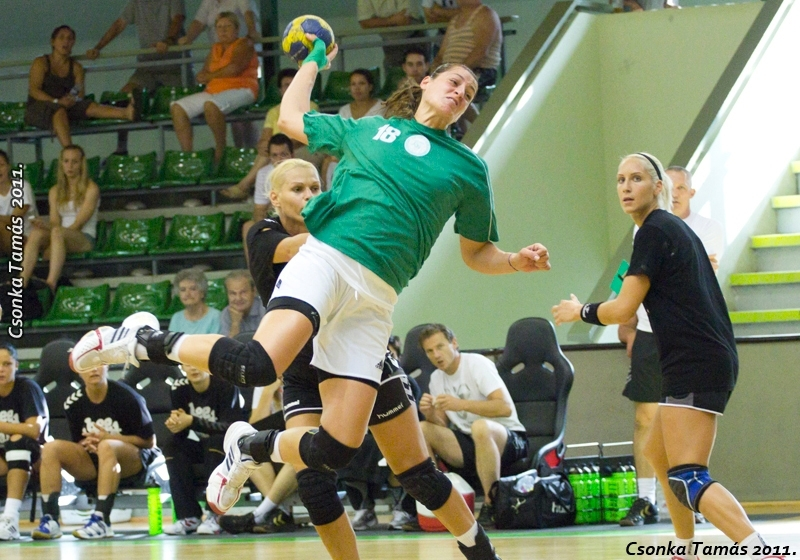
Amorim with Győri ETO KC in 2011.

Amorim found her new home in Hungary, signing with Győri ETO KC on 23 February 2009.

A five times EHF Champions League winner with Győr, Amorim obtained the premier continental club competition title in 2013, 2014, 2017, 2018 and 2019. In an online fans' poll launched by the European Handball Federation, she was chosen as the best left back of the competition in 2014.

Amorim started her last professional season signing with Russia's Rostov-Don, which she left in March once the Russian invasion of Ukraine led Russian teams to be excluded from the EHF Champions League. She then signed with CSM București, playing two Champions League games and the final stretches of the Liga Naționalà and the Cupa României, and upon the season's conclusion in May 2022 Amorim announced her retirement.

=== International ===
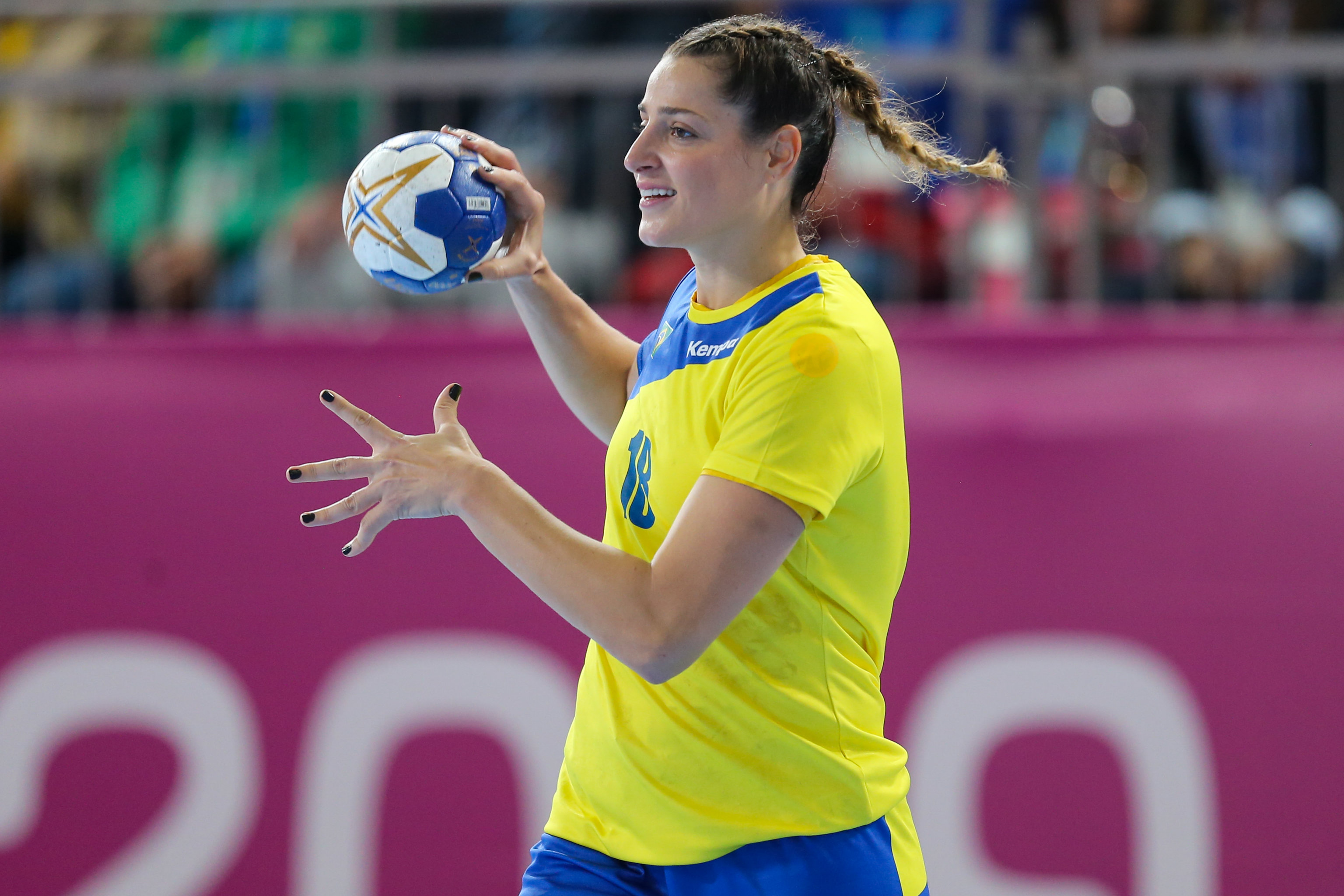
Amorim representing Brazil at the 2019 Pan American Games.

The Brazilian left back won the gold medal in three editions of the Pan American Games, Rio 2007, Guadalajara 2011 and Lima 2019. She also participated in four Olympic handball tournaments, reaching the quarterfinals of London 2012 and Rio 2016. In 2013, she won the World Championship and was elected the Most Valuable Player of the competition.

== Achievements ==
- World Championship:
  - Winner: 2013
- EHF Champions League:
  - Winner: 2013, 2014, 2017, 2018, 2019
  - Finalist: 2012, 2016
  - Semifinalist: 2010, 2011, 2021
- Romanian Cup:
  - Winner: 2022
- Nemzeti Bajnokság I:
  - Winner (10): 2009, 2010, 2011, 2012, 2013, 2014, 2016, 2017, 2018, 2019
- Magyar Kupa:
  - Winner (11): 2009, 2010, 2011, 2012, 2013, 2014, 2015, 2016, 2018, 2019, 2021
- Brazilian Championship:
  - Silver Medalist: 2002
- Macedonian Championship
  - Winner: 2005, 2006, 2007, 2008
- Macedonian Cup
  - Winner: 2005, 2006, 2007, 2008
- Pan American Championship:
  - Winner: 2007, 2011, 2017
  - Runners-up: 2009
- Pan American Games:
  - Winner: 2007, 2011, 2019

== Awards and recognition ==
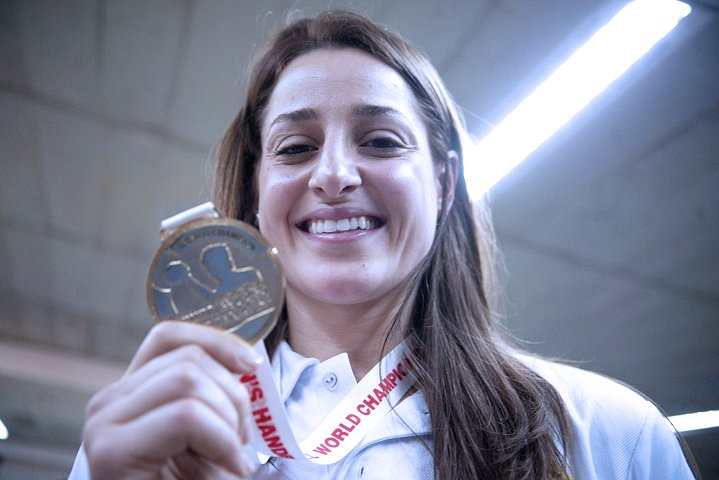
Amorim holding her 2013 World Women's Handball Championship gold medal.

- IHF World Player of the Year: 2014
- EHF Player of the Year: 2019
- All-Star Left Back of the Junior World Championship: 2005
- MVP of the World Championship: 2013
- All-Star Left Back of the EHF Champions League: 2014
- Best Defender of the EHF Champions League: 2016, 2017, 2019, 2020, 2021
- Foreign Handballer of the Year in Hungary: 2014
- All-Star Left Back of the Pan American Championship: 2017
- Handball-Planet.com All-Star Defender of the Year: 2019
- Handball-Planet.com Player of the Decade: 2020
- EHF Hall of Fame in 2023.

== Personal life ==
She got married in 2013 to Macedonian Dean Taleski. Their daughter Idalina was born in May 2023. Amorim got a master's degree in sports management from the Johan Cruyff Institute.

Awards
Preceded by Andrea Lekić	IHF World Player of the Year – Women; 2014	Succeeded by Cristina Neagu
