= 2020 European Women's Handball Championship squads =

The following is a list of squads for each nation competing at the 2020 European Women's Handball Championship.

Each squad consisted of 16 players, with a maximum of six players who could be replaced during the tournament. However, in regard to the COVID-19 pandemic and the potential risk of several players from the same team testing positive, there was no limit to the number of replacements for players testing positive.

Age, caps and goals correct as of 3 December 2020.

== Group A ==
=== Denmark ===
The squad was announced on 10 November 2020. On 26 November, Laura Damgaard replaced Helena Elver in the squad due to a serious knee injury. On 28 November, Rikke Poulsen was added to the squad as a back-up.

Head coach: Jesper Jensen

No.	Pos.	Name	Date of birth (age)	Height	App.	Goals	Club
1	GK	Sandra Toft	18 October 1989 (aged 31)	1.76 m	126	1	(France) Brest Bretagne Handball
2	LW	Lærke Nolsøe	19 February 1996 (aged 24)	1.69 m	33	53	(Denmark) Nykøbing Falster Håndboldklub
3	P	Majbritt Toft Hansen	27 April 1993 (aged 27)	1.83 m	4	3	(Denmark) Viborg HK
8	LB	Anne Mette Hansen	25 August 1994 (aged 26)	1.85 m	99	261	(Hungary) Győri ETO KC
10	P	Kathrine Heindahl	26 March 1992 (aged 28)	1.85 m	76	150	(Russia) CSKA Moscow
11	LB	Line Haugsted	11 November 1994 (aged 26)	1.80 m	52	66	(Denmark) Viborg HK
16	GK	Althea Reinhardt	1 September 1996 (aged 24)	1.84 m	56	0	(Denmark) Odense Håndbold
18	RB	Mette Tranborg	1 January 1996 (aged 24)	1.92 m	62	162	(Denmark) Team Esbjerg
19	CB	Laura Damgaard	14 September 1996 (aged 24)	1.75 m	1	1	(Denmark) Viborg HK
21	RW	Andrea Hansen	22 May 2000 (aged 20)	1.78 m	4	3	(Denmark) København Håndbold
23	LB	Kristina Jørgensen	17 January 1998 (aged 22)	1.86 m	44	69	(Denmark) Viborg HK
24	CB	Mia Rej	2 February 1990 (aged 30)	1.68 m	20	36	(Denmark) København Håndbold
25	RW	Trine Østergaard	17 October 1991 (aged 29)	1.65 m	122	213	(Germany) SG BBM Bietigheim
27	RB	Louise Burgaard	17 October 1992 (aged 28)	1.76 m	111	236	(France) Metz Handball
32	CB	Mie Højlund	24 October 1997 (aged 23)	1.75 m	36	54	(Denmark) Odense Håndbold
34	P	Rikke Iversen	18 May 1993 (aged 27)	1.78 m	15	12	(Denmark) Odense Håndbold

=== France ===
A 19-player squad was announced on 17 November 2020. On 28 November, 20 players were included in the squad.

Head coach: Olivier Krumbholz

No.	Pos.	Name	Date of birth (age)	Height	App.	Goals	Club
1	GK	Laura Glauser	20 August 1993 (aged 27)	1.80 m	80	1	(Hungary) Győri Audi ETO KC
2	CB	Méline Nocandy	25 February 1998 (aged 22)	1.75 m	20	40	(France) Metz Handball
4	RW	Pauline Coatanea	6 July 1993 (aged 27)	1.65 m	40	57	(France) Brest Bretagne Handball
6	LW	Chloé Bouquet	19 April 1995 (aged 25)	1.65 m	17	48	(France) ESBF Besançon
8	LW	Coralie Lassource	1 September 1992 (aged 28)	1.70 m	27	29	(France) Brest Bretagne Handball
10	CB	Grâce Zaadi	7 July 1993 (aged 27)	1.71 m	121	176	(Russia) Rostov-Don
11	RB	Aïssatou Kouyaté	19 April 1995 (aged 25)	1.83 m	8	13	(France) ESBF Besançon
12	GK	Amandine Leynaud	2 May 1986 (aged 34)	1.78 m	235	3	(Hungary) Győri Audi ETO KC
15	LB	Kalidiatou Niakaté	15 March 1995 (aged 25)	1.77 m	34	46	(France) Brest Bretagne Handball
16	GK	Cléopâtre Darleux	1 July 1989 (aged 31)	1.76 m	162	3	(France) Brest Bretagne Handball
17	LW	Siraba Dembélé Pavlović	28 June 1986 (aged 34)	1.72 m	280	835	(Romania) CSM București
19	RB	Océane Sercien-Ugolin	15 December 1997 (aged 22)	1.75 m	17	26	(Slovenia) RK Krim
20	RW	Laura Flippes	13 December 1994 (aged 25)	1.71 m	71	131	(France) Paris 92
21	LB	Orlane Kanor	16 June 1997 (aged 23)	1.78 m	45	77	(France) Metz Handball
24	P	Béatrice Edwige	3 October 1988 (aged 32)	1.82 m	109	76	(Hungary) Győri Audi ETO KC
26	P	Pauletta Foppa	22 December 2000 (aged 19)	1.77 m	24	33	(France) Brest Bretagne Handball
27	LB	Estelle Nze Minko	11 August 1991 (aged 29)	1.78 m	119	259	(Hungary) Győri Audi ETO KC
64	RB	Alexandra Lacrabère	27 April 1987 (aged 33)	1.77 m	244	801	(France) Fleury Loiret HB

=== Montenegro ===
A 19-player squad was announced on 18 November 2020. The final roster was revealed on 1 December.

Head coach: (Denmark) Kim Rasmussen

No.	Pos.	Name	Date of birth (age)	Height	App.	Goals	Club
4	RW	Jovanka Radičević	23 October 1986 (aged 34)	1.69 m	162	887	(Montenegro) ŽRK Budućnost
9	LB	Đurđina Jauković	24 February 1997 (aged 23)	1.85 m	67	214	(France) Brest Bretagne
10	CB	Matea Pletikosić	24 April 1998 (aged 22)	1.69 m	0	0	(Slovenia) RK Krim
12	GK	Anastasija Babović	13 December 2000 (aged 19)	1.88 m	2	0	(Hungary) Dunaújvárosi Kohász KA
13	LW	Dijana Mugoša	22 October 1995 (aged 25)	1.67 m	17	10	(Croatia) RK Podravka
14	RB	Katarina Džaferović	14 July 2002 (aged 18)	1.80 m	0	0	(Montenegro) ŽRK Budućnost
15	RB	Andrea Klikovac	5 May 1991 (aged 29)	1.80 m	80	50	(Romania) CSM București
16	GK	Ljubica Nenezić	15 January 1997 (aged 23)	1.83 m	30	0	(Romania) HC Dunărea Brăila
23	RW	Dijana Ujkić	5 July 1996 (aged 24)	1.72 m	39	38	(Romania) SCM Gloria Buzău
43	GK	Marta Batinović	20 April 1990 (aged 30)	1.88 m	11	0	(Romania) SCM Râmnicu Vâlcea
66	P	Ema Ramusović	28 November 1996 (aged 24)	1.87 m	61	50	(Montenegro) ŽRK Budućnost
71	P	Bobana Klikovac	19 July 1995 (aged 25)	1.81 m	25	15	(Romania) SCM Gloria Buzău
77	LW	Majda Mehmedović	25 May 1990 (aged 30)	1.69 m	121	325	(Montenegro) ŽRK Budućnost
80	LB	Jelena Despotović	30 April 1994 (aged 26)	1.83 m	80	85	(Hungary) Debreceni VSC
96	CB	Itana Grbić	1 September 1996 (aged 24)	1.69 m	52	55	(Montenegro) ŽRK Budućnost
97	P	Nikolina Vukčević	28 July 2000 (aged 20)	1.86 m	4	2	(Montenegro) ŽRK Budućnost

=== Slovenia ===
A 20-player squad was announced on 16 November 2020. It was reduced to 19 players on 26 November.

Head coach: Uroš Bregar

No.	Pos.	Name	Date of birth (age)	Height	App.	Goals	Club
1	GK	Branka Zec	30 October 1986 (aged 34)	1.79 m	71	1	(Germany) VfL Waiblingen
2	P	Valentina Klemenčič	5 February 2002 (aged 18)	1.85 m	10	5	(Slovenia) RK Krim
6	RB	Ana Gros	21 January 1991 (aged 29)	1.86 m	116	560	(France) Brest Bretagne Handball
7	CB	Elizabeth Omoregie	29 December 1996 (aged 23)	1.78 m	0	0	(Romania) CSM București
8	LW	Ema Abina	18 February 1999 (aged 21)	1.70 m	0	0	(Slovenia) RK Krim
9	LB	Nina Žabjek	4 March 1998 (aged 22)	1.78 m	30	25	(Slovenia) RK Krim
10	LB	Tjaša Stanko	5 November 1997 (aged 23)	1.73 m	63	298	(France) Metz Handball
11	LW	Ana Abina	18 February 1999 (aged 21)	1.75 m	43	32	(Slovenia) ŽRK Krka
16	GK	Maja Vojnović	26 January 1998 (aged 22)	1.80 m	31	0	(Slovenia) RK Krim
17	P	Nataša Ljepoja	28 January 1996 (aged 24)	1.78 m	26	16	(Slovenia) RK Krim
18	CB	Nina Zulić	4 December 1995 (aged 24)	1.70 m	47	120	(Turkey) Kastamonu Belediyesi
21	GK	Amra Pandžić	20 September 1989 (aged 31)	1.78 m	55	0	(Turkey) Kastamonu Belediyesi
23	LB	Hana Vučko	14 November 1998 (aged 22)	1.75 m	30	26	(Slovenia) RK Krim
25	RB	Barbara Lazović	4 January 1988 (aged 32)	1.83 m	75	267	(Romania) CSM București
28	LW	Maja Svetik	9 March 1996 (aged 24)	1.67 m	17	29	(Slovenia) RK Krim
29	RW	Živa Čopi	5 August 1998 (aged 22)	1.63 m	6	3	(Slovenia) ŽRK Krka
66	RB/RW	Tija Gomilar Zickero	12 May 2000 (aged 20)	1.63 m	0	0	(Slovenia) RK Krim

== Group B ==
=== Czech Republic ===
A 23-player squad was announced on 28 November 2020. It was reduced to 18 players on 30 November.

Head coach: Jan Bašný

No.	Pos.	Name	Date of birth (age)	Height	App.	Goals	Club
3	RW	Jana Knedlíková	22 June 1989 (aged 31)	1.68 m	107	225	(Norway) Vipers Kristiansand
8	P	Michaela Konečná	6 July 1998 (aged 22)	1.80 m	22	16	(Czech Republic) DHC Sokol Poruba
10	CB	Petra Maňáková	8 February 1989 (aged 31)	1.72 m	127	125	(Czech Republic) DHK Baník Most
11	LB	Hana Kvášová	28 September 1989 (aged 31)	1.78 m	79	138	(France) Sambre Avesnois Handball
13	RB	Silvie Polášková	13 January 1998 (aged 22)	1.76 m	5	11	(Czech Republic) DHC Sokol Poruba
14	LB	Kamila Kordovská	4 December 1997 (aged 22)	1.79 m	55	119	(Germany) HSG Blomberg-Lippe
21	CB	Veronika Mikulášková	16 October 2000 (aged 20)	1.72 m	8	6	(Czech Republic) DHK Baník Most
22	RB	Markéta Hurychová	9 April 1997 (aged 23)	1.74 m	9	10	(France) Saint-Amand Handball
25	CB	Jana Šustková	10 January 1998 (aged 22)	1.77 m	19	21	(Czech Republic) DHK Baník Most
26	GK	Sabrina Novotná	2 July 2000 (aged 20)	1.83 m	2	0	(Slovakia) HK Slovan Duslo Šaľa
28	CB	Šárka Marčíková	12 March 1992 (aged 28)	1.76 m	62	49	(Germany) Frisch Auf Göppingen
29	LW	Adéla Stříšková	14 December 2000 (aged 19)	1.59 m	1	2	(Czech Republic) DHK Baník Most
33	GK	Petra Kudláčková	17 October 1994 (aged 26)	1.73 m	42	1	(Sweden) Kristianstad Handboll
44	RW	Dominika Zachová	4 June 1996 (aged 24)	1.75 m	33	58	(Czech Republic) DHK Baník Most
48	RB	Sára Kovářová	9 February 1999 (aged 21)	1.74 m	13	33	(Turkey) Kastamonu Belediyesi
51	LB	Markéta Jeřábková	8 February 1996 (aged 24)	1.74 m	59	234	(Germany) Thüringer HC
67	LW	Veronika Malá	6 May 1994 (aged 26)	1.70 m	66	183	(France) Paris 92

=== Russia ===
An 18-player squad was announced on 17 November 2020. On 24 November, Valeriia Maslova replaced Anna Vyakhireva in the squad due to a back injury.

Head coach: (Spain) Ambros Martín

No.	Pos.	Name	Date of birth (age)	Height	App.	Goals	Club
1	GK	Anna Sedoykina	1 August 1984 (aged 36)	1.85 m	158	9	(Russia) CSKA Moscow
7	CB	Daria Dmitrieva	9 August 1995 (aged 25)	1.78 m	97	324	(Russia) CSKA Moscow
9	RB	Olga Gorshenina	9 November 1990 (aged 30)	1.83 m	13	17	(Russia) CSKA Moscow
14	LB	Polina Vedekhina	6 January 1994 (aged 26)	1.76 m	40	79	(Russia) CSKA Moscow
16	GK	Galina Gabisova	17 June 1985 (aged 35)	1.80 m	23	0	(Russia) Rostov-Don
17	LB	Vladlena Bobrovnikova	24 October 1987 (aged 33)	1.80 m	71	181	(Russia) Rostov-Don
18	LW	Daria Samokhina	12 August 1992 (aged 28)	1.75 m	45	149	(Russia) HC Astrakhanochka
19	P	Kseniya Makeyeva	19 September 1990 (aged 30)	1.85 m	152	297	(Russia) Rostov-Don
25	RW	Olga Fomina	17 April 1989 (aged 31)	1.75 m	128	264	(Russia) HC Lada
31	CB	Karina Sabirova	23 March 1998 (aged 22)	1.80 m	20	36	(Russia) HC Astrakhanochka
33	CB	Ekaterina Ilina	7 March 1991 (aged 29)	1.74 m	95	250	(Russia) CSKA Moscow
34	LB	Elizaveta Malashenko	26 February 1996 (aged 24)	1.80 m	60	77	(Russia) HC Astrakhanochka
36	RW	Yulia Managarova	27 September 1988 (aged 32)	1.67 m	47	153	(Russia) Rostov-Don
39	RB	Antonina Skorobogatchenko	14 February 1999 (aged 21)	1.81 m	36	83	(Russia) CSKA Moscow
61	RB	Valeriia Maslova	23 January 2001 (aged 19)	1.88 m	11	13	(Montenegro) ŽRK Budućnost
63	LW	Kristina Kozhokar	28 February 1994 (aged 26)	1.74 m	35	51	(Russia) Rostov-Don
67	P	Anastasiia Illarionova	28 March 1999 (aged 21)	1.80 m	16	12	(Russia) CSKA Moscow
88	GK	Victoriya Kalinina	8 December 1988 (aged 31)	1.83 m	94	0	(Russia) Rostov-Don

=== Spain ===
The squad was announced on 18 November 2020.

Head coach: Carlos Viver

No.	Pos.	Name	Date of birth (age)	Height	App.	Goals	Club
2	RW	Marta López	4 February 1990 (aged 30)	1.65 m	113	243	(Romania) SCM Râmnicu Vâlcea
4	RW	Carmen Martín	29 May 1988 (aged 32)	1.69 m	221	751	(Romania) CSM București
6	LB	Carmen Campos	10 July 1995 (aged 25)	1.71 m	9	10	(France) JDA Dijon Handball
8	CB	Silvia Arderíus	11 July 1990 (aged 30)	1.68 m	43	43	(Spain) CBF Málaga Costa del Sol
12	GK	Silvia Navarro	20 March 1979 (aged 41)	1.68 m	208	10	(Spain) BM Remudas
16	GK	Mercedes Castellanos	21 July 1988 (aged 32)	1.84 m	36	1	(Spain) CBF Málaga Costa del Sol
17	LW	Jennifer Gutiérrez Bermejo	20 February 1995 (aged 25)	1.69 m	47	97	(Germany) Borussia Dortmund
25	CB	Nerea Pena	13 December 1989 (aged 30)	1.75 m	159	531	(Denmark) Team Esbjerg
27	LB	Lara González Ortega	22 February 1992 (aged 28)	1.84 m	128	113	(France) ESBF Besançon
30	LW	Soledad López	4 April 1992 (aged 28)	1.62 m	29	82	(Spain) CBF Málaga Costa del Sol
33	P	Kaba Gassama	16 August 1997 (aged 23)	1.84 m	7	6	(France) Nantes Atlantique Handball
34	CB	Alicia Fernández	21 December 1992 (aged 27)	1.72 m	39	98	(Romania) SCM Râmnicu Vâlcea
39	RB	Almudena Rodríguez	9 November 1993 (aged 27)	1.75 m	62	123	(Romania) CS Gloria 2018 Bistrița-Năsăud
44	P	Ainhoa Hernández	27 April 1994 (aged 26)	1.80 m	82	114	(Spain) BM Zuazo
61	P	Lysa Tchaptchet	20 December 2001 (aged 18)	1.85 m	0	0	(Spain) CB Elche
99	RB	Mireya González	18 July 1991 (aged 29)	1.78 m	78	150	(Romania) SCM Râmnicu Vâlcea

=== Sweden ===
A 19-player squad was announced on 27 October 2020. On 20 November, Elin Hansson replaced Hanna Blomstrand in the squad due to an injury. On 30 November, the squad was reduced to 17 players, including Evelina Eriksson traveling with the team as a back-up.

Head coach: Tomas Axnér

No.	Pos.	Name	Date of birth (age)	Height	App.	Goals	Club
6	CB	Carin Strömberg	10 July 1993 (aged 27)	1.84 m	92	113	(Denmark) Viborg HK
7	P	Linn Blohm	20 May 1992 (aged 28)	1.80 m	102	258	(Romania) Minaur Baia Mare
8	LB	Jamina Roberts	28 May 1990 (aged 30)	1.76 m	166	345	(Sweden) IK Sävehof
9	CB	Melissa Petrén	18 January 1995 (aged 25)	1.73 m	18	46	(Denmark) HH Elite
10	RW	Mathilda Lundström	20 December 1996 (aged 23)	1.64 m	36	36	(Sweden) IK Sävehof
11	P	Johanna Forsberg	16 October 1995 (aged 25)	1.77 m	21	22	(Denmark) Nykøbing Falster Håndboldklub
12	GK	Filippa Idéhn	15 August 1990 (aged 30)	1.83 m	125	11	(Romania) Minaur Baia Mare
15	LW	Emma Rask	17 January 1996 (aged 24)	1.61 m	5	5	(Sweden) H 65 Höör
16	GK	Jessica Ryde	18 May 1994 (aged 26)	1.85 m	12	0	(Denmark) Herning-Ikast Håndbold
17	RB	Nina Dano	12 June 2000 (aged 20)	1.72 m	4	11	(Sweden) IK Sävehof
19	P	Anna Lagerquist	16 October 1993 (aged 27)	1.75 m	60	86	(Russia) Rostov-Don
20	CB	Isabelle Gulldén	29 June 1989 (aged 31)	1.78 m	218	830	(France) Brest Bretagne Handball
23	CB	Emma Lindqvist	17 September 1997 (aged 23)	1.77 m	21	25	(Sweden) H 65 Höör
24	RW	Nathalie Hagman	19 July 1991 (aged 29)	1.67 m	157	495	(France) Nantes Atlantique Handball
29	LB	Kristin Thorleifsdóttir	13 January 1998 (aged 22)	1.82 m	5	7	(Denmark) Randers HK
38	LW	Elin Hansson	7 August 1996 (aged 24)	1.73 m	6	9	(Sweden) Skuru IK

== Group C ==
=== Croatia ===
A 22-player squad was announced on 10 November 2020. The roster of 18 players was revealed on 2 December.

Head coach: Nenad Šoštarić

No.	Pos.	Name	Date of birth (age)	Height	App.	Goals	Club
1	GK	Lucija Bešen	29 March 1998 (aged 22)	1.80 m	5	0	(Croatia) RK Lokomotiva Zagreb
3	LW	Paula Posavec	26 August 1996 (aged 24)	1.70 m	41	54	(Croatia) RK Lokomotiva Zagreb
7	CB	Dora Krsnik	19 January 1992 (aged 28)	1.70 m	32	56	(France) HB Plan de Cuques
8	CB	Stela Posavec	26 August 1996 (aged 24)	1.68 m	27	49	(Croatia) RK Lokomotiva Zagreb
9	LB	Ćamila Mičijević	8 September 1994 (aged 26)	1.94 m	35	87	(France) Metz Handball
10	RB	Dejana Milosavljević	23 November 1994 (aged 26)	1.73 m	13	19	(Croatia) RK Podravka Koprivnica
14	LB	Larissa Kalaus	24 June 1996 (aged 24)	1.73 m	17	55	(Croatia) RK Lokomotiva Zagreb
15	RB	Dora Kalaus	24 June 1996 (aged 24)	1.72 m	21	9	(Croatia) RK Lokomotiva Zagreb
17	P	Katarina Ježić	19 December 1992 (aged 27)	1.73 m	73	145	(Hungary) Siófok KC
19	RW	Tena Japundža	28 October 1998 (aged 22)	1.73 m	2	1	(Croatia) RK Lokomotiva Zagreb
28	LW	Andrea Šimara	13 July 1997 (aged 23)	1.71 m	2	3	(Croatia) RK Lokomotiva Zagreb
31	P	Ana Debelić	9 January 1994 (aged 26)	1.83 m	35	46	(Russia) HC Astrakhanochka
35	RW	Josipa Mamić	7 January 1996 (aged 24)	1.67 m	0	0	(Croatia) ŽRK Bjelovar
44	LB	Marijeta Vidak	14 August 1992 (aged 28)	1.79 m	22	14	(Croatia) ŽRK Umag
77	CB	Valentina Blažević	14 February 1994 (aged 26)	1.70 m	32	51	(Romania) Măgura Cisnădie
88	LB	Kristina Prkačin	21 October 1997 (aged 23)	1.83 m	13	7	(Croatia) RK Lokomotiva Zagreb
91	GK	Tea Pijević	18 November 1991 (aged 29)	1.72 m	25	1	(Hungary) Alba Fehérvár KC

=== Hungary ===
A 20-player squad was announced on 22 November 2020. On 26 November, the squad was reduced to 19 players.

Head coach: Gábor Danyi & Gábor Elek

No.	Pos.	Name	Date of birth (age)	Height	App.	Goals	Club
2	LB	Szandra Szöllősi-Zácsik	22 April 1990 (aged 30)	1.85 m	58	179	(Hungary) MTK Budapest
4	P	Petra Tóvizi	15 March 1999 (aged 21)	1.80 m	26	34	(Hungary) Debrecen
6	LW	Nadine Schatzl	19 November 1993 (aged 27)	1.74 m	63	162	(Hungary) Ferencváros
8	CB	Anikó Kovacsics	29 August 1991 (aged 29)	1.70 m	130	274	(Hungary) Ferencváros
12	GK	Melinda Szikora	19 November 1988 (aged 32)	1.74 m	6	0	(Hungary) Siófok
16	GK	Blanka Bíró	22 September 1994 (aged 26)	1.87 m	73	1	(Hungary) Ferencváros
19	LW	Gréta Márton	3 October 1999 (aged 21)	1.73 m	16	39	(Hungary) Ferencváros
20	CB	Rita Lakatos	6 July 1999 (aged 21)	1.77 m	9	7	(Hungary) Vác
23	LB	Klára Csiszár-Szekeres	1 December 1987 (aged 33)	1.86 m	93	33	(Hungary) Ferencváros
42	RB	Katrin Klujber	21 April 1999 (aged 21)	1.70 m	17	78	(Hungary) Ferencváros
44	LB	Gréta Kácsor	24 April 2000 (aged 20)	1.76 m	2	4	(Hungary) Vác
45	LB	Noémi Háfra	5 October 1998 (aged 22)	1.79 m	43	113	(Hungary) Ferencváros
48	RW	Dorottya Faluvégi	31 March 1998 (aged 22)	1.67 m	19	37	(Hungary) Győr
60	CB	Eszter Tóth	27 October 1992 (aged 28)	1.80 m	2	4	(Hungary) Mosonmagyaróvár
66	RW	Viktória Lukács	31 October 1995 (aged 25)	1.68 m	56	127	(Hungary) Győr
76	P	Fanny Helembai	26 December 1996 (aged 23)	1.78 m	2	2	(Hungary) Vác
87	LB	Zsuzsanna Tomori	18 June 1987 (aged 33)	1.87 m	169	446	(Hungary) Siófok

=== Netherlands ===
An 18-player squad was announced on 9 November 2020.

Head coach: (France) Emmanuel Mayonnade

No.	Pos.	Name	Date of birth (age)	Height	App.	Goals	Club
5	LB	Jessy Kramer	16 February 1990 (aged 30)	1.78 m	144	110	(France) Toulon
6	RB	Laura van der Heijden	27 June 1990 (aged 30)	1.72 m	215	662	(Germany) Borussia Dortmund
7	RW	Debbie Bont	9 December 1990 (aged 29)	1.75 m	170	335	(France) Metz Handball
8	LB	Lois Abbingh	13 August 1992 (aged 28)	1.77 m	154	689	(Denmark) Odense Håndbold
9	CB	Larissa Nüsser	8 February 2000 (aged 20)	1.75 m	23	26	(Denmark) København Håndbold
10	P	Danick Snelder	22 May 1990 (aged 30)	1.78 m	176	420	(Germany) SG BBM Bietigheim
12	LW	Bo van Wetering	10 May 1999 (aged 21)	1.72 m	17	39	(Germany) TuS Metzingen
18	LB	Kelly Dulfer	21 March 1994 (aged 26)	1.85 m	117	127	(Germany) Borussia Dortmund
19	P	Merel Freriks	6 January 1998 (aged 22)	1.75 m	33	36	(Germany) Borussia Dortmund
20	LB	Inger Smits	17 September 1994 (aged 26)	1.79 m	31	26	(Germany) Borussia Dortmund
24	LW	Martine Smeets	5 May 1990 (aged 30)	1.72 m	110	139	(Romania) CSM București
26	RW	Angela Malestein	31 January 1993 (aged 27)	1.70 m	147	326	(Hungary) FTC Rail-Cargo Hungaria
28	P	Nikita van der Vliet	14 March 2000 (aged 20)	1.73 m	2	6	(Denmark) Nykøbing Falster Håndboldklub
30	GK	Rinka Duijndam	6 August 1997 (aged 23)	1.78 m	29	0	(Germany) Borussia Dortmund
33	GK	Tess Wester	19 May 1993 (aged 27)	1.78 m	109	10	(Denmark) Odense Håndbold
42	LB	Harma van Kreij	11 November 1993 (aged 27)	1.75 m	0	0	(Slovenia) RK Krim
48	RB	Dione Housheer	26 September 1999 (aged 21)	1.80 m	24	41	(Denmark) Nykøbing Falster Håndboldklub

=== Serbia ===
A 22-player squad was announced on 10 November 2020.

Head coach: Ljubomir Obradović

No.	Pos.	Name	Date of birth (age)	Height	App.	Goals	Club
2	LW	Sanja Radosavljević	15 January 1994 (aged 26)	1.71 m	74	209	(Hungary) Váci NKSE
3	RW	Katarina Krpež Šlezak	2 May 1988 (aged 32)	1.68 m	142	387	(Russia) Rostov-Don
4	P	Jovana Milojević	24 July 1992 (aged 28)	1.73 m	17	24	(Poland) MKS Zagłębie Lubin
5	LB	Jelena Trifunović	4 August 1991 (aged 29)	1.80 m	72	114	(Romania) SCM Râmnicu Vâlcea
7	CB	Andrea Lekić	6 September 1987 (aged 33)	1.78 m	121	554	(Montenegro) ŽRK Budućnost Podgorica
9	RB	Jelena Lavko	6 July 1991 (aged 29)	1.82 m	114	249	(Romania) CS Minaur Baia Mare
13	P	Jelena Agbaba	20 June 1997 (aged 23)	1.79 m	20	41	(Hungary) Békéscsabai Előre NKSE
14	RW	Željka Nikolić	12 July 1991 (aged 29)	1.64 m	51	98	(Romania) SCM Râmnicu Vâlcea
15	RB	Anđela Janjušević	18 June 1995 (aged 25)	1.78 m	52	48	(Romania) SCM Gloria Buzău
16	GK	Jovana Risović	7 October 1993 (aged 27)	1.71 m	42	2	(Slovenia) RK Krim
20	P	Slađana Pop-Lazić	26 July 1988 (aged 32)	1.78 m	106	301	(France) Brest Bretagne Handball
21	LW	Dijana Radojević	2 April 1990 (aged 30)	1.68 m	61	79	(Romania) CS Măgura Cisnădie
25	LB	Jovana Jovović	4 December 2001 (aged 18)	1.77 m	12	4	(Hungary) Dunaújvárosi KKA
27	GK	Katarina Tomašević	6 February 1984 (aged 36)	1.78 m	115	2	(Hungary) Szombathelyi KKA
33	LB	Jovana Stoiljković	30 September 1988 (aged 32)	1.81 m	106	349	(France) Chambray
71	CB	Kristina Liščević	20 October 1989 (aged 31)	1.73 m	98	256	(Romania) SCM Râmnicu Vâlcea

== Group D ==
=== Germany ===
An 18-player squad was announced on 23 November 2020. On 26 November, Annika Lott replaced Mia Zschocke due to an injury.

Head coach: (Netherlands) Henk Groener

No.	Pos.	Name	Date of birth (age)	Height	App.	Goals	Club
2	RB	Marlene Zapf	6 January 1990 (aged 30)	1.70 m	83	186	(Germany) TuS Metzingen
3	RW	Amelie Berger	22 July 1999 (aged 21)	1.69 m	26	47	(Germany) SG BBM Bietigheim
4	CB	Alina Grijseels	12 April 1996 (aged 24)	1.74 m	31	39	(Germany) Borussia Dortmund
11	LB	Xenia Smits	22 April 1994 (aged 26)	1.82 m	60	143	(Germany) SG BBM Bietigheim
12	GK	Dinah Eckerle	16 October 1995 (aged 25)	1.71 m	53	2	(France) Metz Handball
13	P	Julia Behnke	28 March 1993 (aged 27)	1.80 m	79	155	(Hungary) Ferencvárosi TC
15	CB	Kim Naidzinavicius	6 April 1991 (aged 29)	1.85 m	112	265	(Germany) SG BBM Bietigheim
16	GK	Isabell Roch	26 July 1990 (aged 30)	1.74 m	31	0	(Germany) Borussia Dortmund
20	LB	Emily Bölk	26 April 1998 (aged 22)	1.82 m	55	165	(Hungary) Ferencvárosi TC
21	LW	Ina Großmann	21 August 1990 (aged 30)	1.70 m	35	52	(Germany) Thüringer HC
22	RB/RW	Maren Weigel	22 May 1994 (aged 26)	1.77 m	30	31	(Germany) TuS Metzingen
23	LB	Annika Lott	7 December 1999 (aged 20)	1.80 m	1	1	(Germany) Buxtehuder SV
27	RB	Julia Maidhof	13 March 1998 (aged 22)	1.76 m	6	14	(Germany) SG BBM Bietigheim
29	LW	Antje Lauenroth	3 October 1988 (aged 32)	1.70 m	29	58	(Germany) SG BBM Bietigheim
32	CB/LB	Ewgenija Minevskaja	31 October 1992 (aged 28)	1.83 m	90	169	(Romania) SCM Râmnicu Vâlcea
33	P	Luisa Schulze	14 September 1990 (aged 30)	1.90 m	97	120	(Germany) SG BBM Bietigheim

=== Norway ===
The squad was announced on 10 November 2020. On 28 November, Katrine Lunde was added to the squad due to Silje Solberg still not testing negative for COVID-19. On 2 December, Rikke Granlund replaced Silje Solberg in the squad, while waiting for Solberg testing negative for COVID-19. On 7 December, Katrine Lunde replaced Emily Stang Sando in the squad. On 12 December, Silje Solberg replaced Rikke Granlund in the squad. On 15 December, Marta Tomac replaced Veronica Kristiansen in the squad. On 18 December, Veronica Kristiansen replaced Marta Tomac in the squad.

Head coach: (Iceland) Thorir Hergeirsson

No.	Pos.	Name	Date of birth (age)	Height	App.	Goals	Club
1	GK	Emily Stang Sando	8 March 1989 (aged 31)	1.80 m	28	0	(Germany) SG BBM Bietigheim
2	CB	Henny Reistad	9 February 1999 (aged 21)	1.81 m	17	44	(Norway) Vipers Kristiansand
3	LB	Emilie Hegh Arntzen	1 January 1994 (aged 26)	1.84 m	107	188	(Norway) Vipers Kristiansand
4	LB	Veronica Kristiansen	10 July 1990 (aged 30)	1.75 m	134	451	(Hungary) Győri Audi ETO KC
5	P	Marit Malm Frafjord	25 November 1985 (aged 35)	1.82 m	202	409	(Denmark) Team Esbjerg
6	P	Heidi Løke	12 December 1982 (aged 37)	1.73 m	218	794	(Norway) Vipers Kristiansand
7	RB	Stine Skogrand	3 March 1993 (aged 27)	1.73 m	87	133	(Denmark) Herning-Ikast Håndbold
9	RB	Nora Mørk	5 April 1991 (aged 29)	1.67 m	121	580	(Norway) Vipers Kristiansand
10	CB	Stine Bredal Oftedal	25 September 1991 (aged 29)	1.68 m	192	510	(Hungary) Győri Audi ETO KC
11	RW	Malin Aune	4 March 1995 (aged 25)	1.65 m	60	116	(Norway) Vipers Kristiansand
12	GK	Silje Solberg	16 June 1990 (aged 30)	1.78 m	148	1	(Hungary) Győri Audi ETO KC
13	P	Kari Brattset Dale	15 February 1991 (aged 29)	1.83 m	68	153	(Hungary) Győri Audi ETO KC
16	GK	Katrine Lunde	30 March 1980 (aged 40)	1.80 m	299	3	(Norway) Vipers Kristiansand
20	RW	Marit Røsberg Jacobsen	25 February 1994 (aged 26)	1.65 m	62	118	(Denmark) Team Esbjerg
23	LW	Camilla Herrem	8 October 1986 (aged 34)	1.67 m	252	690	(Norway) Sola HK
24	LW	Sanna Solberg-Isaksen	16 June 1990 (aged 30)	1.78 m	149	277	(Denmark) Team Esbjerg
25	LB	Kristine Breistøl	23 August 1993 (aged 27)	1.92 m	9	8	(Denmark) Team Esbjerg
26	CB	Marta Tomac	20 September 1990 (aged 30)	1.79 m	73	72	(Norway) Vipers Kristiansand
28	GK	Rikke Granlund	14 November 1989 (aged 31)	1.72 m	2	0	(Denmark) Team Esbjerg

=== Poland ===
A 22-player squad was announced on 23 November 2020. It was reduced to 17 players on 30 November. Joanna Wołoszyk replaced Sylwia Matuszczyk on 30 November.

Head coach: (Norway) Arne Senstad

No.	Pos.	Name	Date of birth (age)	Height	App.	Goals	Club
7	RW	Aneta Łabuda	7 January 1995 (aged 25)	1.60 m	43	73	(France) ESBF Besançon
10	LB	Marta Gęga	16 April 1986 (aged 34)	1.84 m	59	89	(Poland) MKS Lublin
11	LW	Kinga Grzyb	12 January 1982 (aged 38)	1.68 m	263	724	(Poland) MKS Zagłębie Lubin
12	GK	Weronika Gawlik	12 October 1986 (aged 34)	1.80 m	98	4	(Poland) MKS Lublin
16	GK	Adrianna Płaczek	10 December 1993 (aged 26)	1.74 m	50	0	(France) Nantes Atlantique Handball
17	RW	Adrianna Górna	22 March 1996 (aged 24)	1.71 m	18	13	(Poland) MKS Zagłębie Lubin
18	RB	Aleksandra Zych	28 July 1993 (aged 27)	1.86 m	77	98	(Romania) CS Măgura Cisnădie
20	P	Joanna Drabik	28 October 1993 (aged 27)	1.80 m	76	135	(Poland) MKS Zagłębie Lubin
22	LB	Aleksandra Rosiak	7 July 1997 (aged 23)	1.82 m	23	22	(Poland) MKS Lublin
24	LB	Joanna Wołoszyk	19 January 1995 (aged 25)	1.84 m	39	19	(France) Saint-Amand Handball
39	RB	Natalia Nosek	20 April 1998 (aged 22)	1.79 m	17	12	(Poland) MKS Lublin
49	CB	Karolina Kochaniak	5 July 1995 (aged 25)	1.75 m	8	3	(Poland) MKS Zagłębie Lubin
66	P	Joanna Szarawaga	2 April 1994 (aged 26)	1.85 m	38	46	(Poland) MKS Lublin
77	CB	Patrycja Świerżewska	5 March 1996 (aged 24)	1.77 m	10	9	(Poland) MKS Zagłębie Lubin
78	LB	Paulina Uścinowicz	16 October 1999 (aged 21)	1.86 m	0	0	(France) Fleury Loiret HB
94	CB	Romana Roszak	1 October 1994 (aged 26)	1.75 m	30	59	(Poland) Piotrcovia Piotrków Trybunalski
96	LW	Dagmara Nocuń	2 January 1996 (aged 24)	1.66 m	11	7	(Poland) MKS Lublin

=== Romania ===
A 21-player squad was announced on 16 November 2020. Later, Alexandra Subțirică replaced injured Raluca Băcăoanu in the squad. On 29 November, the squad was reduced to 18 players and Crina Pintea became first Romanian player to miss the tournament due to the COVID-19 pandemic. On 1 December, Laura Moisă also tested positive for COVID-19.

Head coach: Bogdan Burcea

No.	Pos.	Name	Date of birth (age)	Height	App.	Goals	Club
1	GK	Ana Maria Măzăreanu	4 February 1993 (aged 27)	1.80 m	7	0	(Romania) Gloria Bistrița
2	LW	Nicoleta Dincă	2 July 1988 (aged 32)	1.73 m	27	30	(Romania) Gloria Bistrița
6	P	Alexandra Subțirică	8 December 1987 (aged 32)	1.70 m	0	0	(Romania) Gloria Buzău
7	CB	Eliza Buceschi	1 August 1993 (aged 27)	1.77 m	75	223	(Romania) Rapid București
8	LB	Cristina Neagu	26 August 1988 (aged 32)	1.80 m	198	830	(Romania) CSM București
11	CB	Ana Maria Țicu	23 February 1992 (aged 28)	1.70 m	9	7	(Romania) SCM Craiova
13	CB	Cristina Laslo	10 April 1996 (aged 24)	1.77 m	35	28	(Romania) Minaur Baia Mare
16	GK	Denisa Dedu	27 September 1994 (aged 26)	1.82 m	59	4	(Romania) CSM București
17	CB	Andreea Popa	3 June 2000 (aged 20)	1.77 m	2	4	(Romania) Minaur Baia Mare
19	RB	Laura Popa	29 June 1994 (aged 26)	1.81 m	36	19	(Romania) Rapid București
20	GK	Iulia Dumanska	15 August 1996 (aged 24)	1.78 m	45	0	(Croatia) Podravka Koprivnica
26	LB	Anca Polocoșer	1 May 1997 (aged 23)	1.80 m	19	12	(Romania) Minaur Baia Mare
27	P	Lorena Ostase	25 July 1997 (aged 23)	1.79 m	10	12	(Romania) CSM Slatina
30	RW	Sonia Seraficeanu	25 July 1997 (aged 23)	1.74 m	13	17	(Romania) Minaur Baia Mare
77	LW	Ana Maria Iuganu	25 February 1990 (aged 30)	1.75 m	32	34	(Romania) Gloria Buzău
90	RB	Ana Maria Savu	24 February 1990 (aged 30)	1.86 m	32	39	(Romania) SCM Craiova
97	LW	Alexandra Dindiligan	16 February 1997 (aged 23)	1.74 m	0	0	(Romania) HC Zalău
