= Kalaus =

Kalaus may refer to:

- Kalaus (river), a river in Stavropol Krai, Russia
- Dora Kalaus (born 1996), Croatian handball player
- Larissa Kalaus (born 1996), Croatian handball player
- Valter Kalaus (born 1970), Hungarian swimmer
