= Nenad Šoštarić =

Croatian handball coach (born 1959)

Personal information
- Full name: Nenad Šoštarić
- Nationality: Croatian
- Born: 16 February 1959 (age 67) Zagreb, FPR Yugoslavia

Sport
- Sport: Handball

Senior clubs
- Years: Team
- –: RK Borac Zagreb
- –: Badel 1862 Zagreb
National team
- Years: Team
- 1977: Yugoslavia U-18
- 1979: Yugoslavia U-20
- –: Yugoslavia

Teams managed
- 1989–1991: Modea Šparta Tuing
- 1992–1996: Karbon Zaprešić
- 1994–1996: Croatia U-18 (women)
- 1996–1997: Al Jazira
- 1997–1998: RK Kraš Zagreb
- 1997–1998: Croatia (women)
- 1999–2000: Jordan (men and women)
- 1999–2001: Al Jazira
- 2001–2003: Croatia (women)
- 2003–2006: Al Jazira
- 2008–2009: RK Sesvete
- 2009: Anhui Hefei
- 2009–2014: RK Lokomotiva Zagreb
- 2010–2012: Croatia junior
- 2016–2023: RK Lokomotiva Zagreb
- 2017–2023: Croatia (women)
- 2023–2024: RK Zagreb
- 2025–: RK Zagreb
Medal record
Women's handball
Representing Croatia
European Championship
Bronze medal – third place	2020 Denmark
Mediterranean Games
Silver medal – second place	2022 Oran	Team

Nenad Šoštarić (born 16 February 1959) is a Croatian retired handball player.

== Career ==
Šoštarić took over the Croatian women's national team as the head coach on 20 September 2017, following the sacking of Goran Mrđen. He guided them to the sixteenth and last place in the 2018 European Championship. Two years later, Šoštarić led Croatia to a surprising bronze medal at the 2020 European Championship in Denmark.
