= Klikovac =

Klikovac or Klikovać (Serbian Cyrillic: Кликовац, Serbian Cyrillic: Кликоваћ) is a South Slavic surname, and may refer to:

- Andrea Klikovac (born 1991), Montenegrin handball player
- Bobana Klikovac (born 1995), Montenegrin handball player
- Filip Klikovac (born 1989), Montenegrin water polo player
- Klaudija Bubalo née Klikovac (born 1970), Croatian handball player
