= EHF Euro 2020 =

EHF Euro 2020 may refer to:

- 2020 European Men's Handball Championship
- 2020 European Women's Handball Championship
