= Croatia women's national handball team =

Women's national handball team representing Croatia

Croatia

Information
- Nickname: Kraljice šoka (Shock Queens)
- Association: Croatian Handball Federation (HRS)
- Coach: Ivica Obrvan
- Assistant coach: Antonijo Pranjič
- Most caps: Klaudija Bubalo (166)
- Most goals: Klaudija Bubalo (769)

Colours
1st	2nd

Results

Summer Olympics
- Appearances: 1 (First in 2012)
- Best result: 7th (2012)

World Championship
- Appearances: 9 (First in 1995)
- Best result: 6th (1997)

European Championship
- Appearances: 13 (First in 1994)
- Best result: 3rd (2020)
- Last updated on Unknown.

Croatia women's national handball team
Medal record

European Championship
Bronze medal – third place	2020 Denmark	Team

Mediterranean Games
Gold medal – first place	1993 Languedoc-Rousillon	
Silver medal – second place	1997 Bari	
Silver medal – second place	2022 Oran	Team
Bronze medal – third place	2005 Almería	Team
Bronze medal – third place	2013 Mersin	

The Croatia women's national handball team is the national handball team of Croatia.

== Competitive record ==
Champions Runners-up Third place Fourth place

=== Olympic Games ===
Year	Position	GP	W	D	L	GS	GA	GD
1976–1988	Part of Yugoslavia							
(Spain) 1992	Did not enter							
(United States) 1996	Did not qualify							
(Australia) 2000	Did not qualify							
(Greece) 2004	Did not qualify							
(China) 2008	Did not qualify							
(United Kingdom) 2012	7th	6	4	0	2	167	140	+27
(Brazil) 2016	Did not qualify							
(Japan) 2020	Did not qualify							
(France) 2024	Did not qualify							
(United States) 2028	TBD							
(Australia) 2032	TBD							
Total	1/11	6	4	0	2	167	140	+27

=== World Championship ===
Year	Position	GP	W	D	L	GS	GA	GD
1957–1990	Part of Yugoslavia							
(Norway) 1993	Did not enter							
(Austria) (Hungary) 1995	10th	8	5	0	3	188	175	+13
(Germany) 1997	6th	9	7	0	2	249	189	+60
(Denmark) (Norway) 1999	Did not qualify							
(Italy) 2001	Did not qualify							
(Croatia) 2003	14th	5	2	0	3	142	122	+20
(Russia) 2005	11th	8	3	0	5	250	228	+22
(France) 2007	9th	8	3	1	4	237	224	+13
(China) 2009	Did not qualify							
(Brazil) 2011	7th	9	6	0	3	266	220	+46
(Serbia) 2013	Did not qualify							
(Denmark) 2015	Did not qualify							
(Germany) 2017	Did not qualify							
(Japan) 2019	Did not qualify							
(Spain) 2021	18th	6	2	0	4	163	156	+7
(Denmark) (Norway) (Sweden) 2023	14th	6	3	1	2	150	120	+30
(Germany) (Netherlands) 2025	25th	7	4	0	3	210	166	+44
(Hungary) 2027	TBD							
(Spain) 2029	TBD							
(Czech Republic) (Poland) 2031	TBD							
Total	9/20	66	35	2	29	1855	1600	+255

=== European Championship ===
Year	Position	GP	W	D	L	GS	GA	GD
(Germany) 1994	5th	6	4	0	2	115	118	−3
(Denmark) 1996	6th	6	3	0	3	138	143	−5
(Netherlands) 1998	Did not qualify							
(Romania) 2000	Did not qualify							
(Denmark) 2002	Did not qualify							
(Hungary) 2004	13th	3	1	0	2	82	89	−7
(Sweden) 2006	7th	6	3	0	3	141	143	−2
(North Macedonia) 2008	6th	7	3	0	4	212	208	+4
(Denmark) (Norway) 2010	9th	6	3	0	3	152	167	−15
(Serbia) 2012	13th	3	1	0	2	65	69	−4
(Croatia) (Hungary) 2014	13th	3	1	0	2	83	83	0
(Sweden) 2016	16th	3	0	0	3	68	97	−29
(France) 2018	16th	3	0	0	3	59	83	−24
(Denmark) 2020	3rd	8	6	0	2	193	196	−3
(Montenegro) (North Macedonia) (Slovenia) 2022	10th	6	1	1	4	132	159	−27
(Austria) (Hungary) (Switzerland) 2024	19th	3	0	1	2	65	77	−12
(Czech Republic) (Poland) (Romania) (Slovakia) (Turkey) 2026	Qualified							
(Denmark) (Norway) (Sweden) 2028	TBD							
(Belgium) (France) 2030	TBD							
(Denmark) (Germany) (Poland) 2032	TBD							
Total	14/20	63	26	2	35	1505	1632	−127

=== Mediterranean Games ===
- 1993 – Champions
- 1997 – Runners-up
- 2005 – 3rd place
- 2009 – 6th place
- 2013 – 3rd place
- 2018 – Did not participate
- 2022 – Runners-up
- 2026 – Did not participate
- 2030 – TBD

=== Other competitions ===
- Carpathian Trophy 1996 – 2nd
- Carpathian Trophy 1999 – 2nd
- Carpathian Trophy 2005 – 3rd
- Carpathian Trophy 2007 – 3rd

== Team ==
=== Current squad ===
Preliminary squad for the 2026 European Women's Handball Championship.

Head coach: Ivica Obrvan

No.	Pos.	Name	Date of birth (age)	Height	App.	Goals	Club
1	GK	Lucija Bešen	29 March 1998 (age 28)	1.82 m	83	2	(Croatia) RK Podravka Koprivnica
4	LB	Tina Barišić	30 October 2000 (age 26)	1.85 m	46	156	(Croatia) RK Podravka Koprivnica
5	CB	Iva Zrilić	13 October 2004 (age 22)	1.66 m	24	14	(Croatia) RK Lokomotiva Zagreb
6	P	Sara Šenvald	14 March 1996 (age 30)	1.83 m	61	71	(Croatia) RK Podravka Koprivnica
7	RB	Klara Birtić	28 March 2002 (age 24)	1.79 m	32	85	(Croatia) RK Podravka Koprivnica
8	RW	Kala Kosovac	29 May 2005 (age 21)	1.68 m	8	14	(Croatia) RK Podravka Koprivnica
10	CB	Dejana Milosavljević	23 November 1994 (age 31)	1.72 m	72	207	(Croatia) RK Podravka Koprivnica
12	GK	Ivana Kapitanović	17 September 1994 (age 32)	1.84 m	75	6	(Romania) CS Minaur Baia Mare
13	LW	Paula Posavec	26 August 1996 (age 30)	1.70 m	97	131	(Croatia) RK Lokomotiva Zagreb
17	P	Katarina Ježić	19 December 1992 (age 33)	1.73 m	130	285	(Romania) HC Dunărea Brăila
18	CB	Stela Posavec	26 August 1996 (age 30)	1.65 m	83	134	(Croatia) RK Lokomotiva Zagreb
25	RW	Lana Strugar	27 November 2004 (age 21)	1.68 m	4	4	(Croatia) RK Lokomotiva Zagreb
26	P	Mia Brkić	11 May 2003 (age 23)	1.83 m	31	25	(Croatia) RK Podravka Koprivnica
28	LW	Andrea Šimara	13 July 1997 (age 29)	1.71 m	75	139	(Croatia) RK Podravka Koprivnica
34	CB	Ivana Fratnik	26 October 2006 (age 20)	1.80 m	3	7	(Croatia) RK Podravka Koprivnica
45	CB	Iva Bule	14 November 2004 (age 21)	1.74 m	35	50	(Croatia) RK Lokomotiva Zagreb
48	RB	Hannah Vuljak	18 August 2002 (age 24)	1.82 m	21	20	(Montenegro) ŽRK Budućnost Podgorica
50	GK	Petra Marinović	29 June 2001 (age 25)	1.80 m	12	0	(Croatia) RK Podravka Koprivnica
63	LB	Sara Sablić	12 March 2000 (age 26)	1.91 m	5	3	(Romania) CS Minaur Baia Mare
88	LB	Kristina Prkačin	21 October 1997 (age 29)	1.83 m	68	68	(Croatia) RK Lokomotiva Zagreb

=== Medal-winning squads ===
- Bronze medal at the 2020 European Championship: Lucija Bešen, Paula Posavec, Dora Krsnik, Stela Posavec, Ćamila Mičijević, Dejana Milosavljević, Larissa Kalaus, Dora Kalaus, Katarina Ježić, Tena Japundža, Andrea Šimara, Ana Debelić, Josipa Mamić, Marijeta Vidak, Valentina Blažević, Kristina Prkačin, Tea Pijević
  - coach: Nenad Šoštarić

=== Notable former players ===
- Maida Arslanagić
- Klaudija Bubalo
- Andrea Čović
- Ana Debelić
- Kristina Elez
- Anita Gaće
- Jelena Grubišić
- Lidija Horvat
- Tena Japundža
- Ivana Jelčić
- Dijana Jovetić
- Larissa Kalaus (55 caps)
- Sanela Knezović
- Nataša Kolega
- Dora Krsnik
- Ivana Lovrić
- Vesna Milanović-Litre
- Andrea Penezić
- Snježana Petika
- Adriana Prosenjak
- Nikica Pušić-Koroljević
- Barbara Stančin
- Miranda Tatari
- Maja Zebić
- Marta Žderić

=== Head coaches ===
Name	Period
Vatromir Shroj	1992–1996
Josip Šojat	1996–2000
Zdenko Kordi	2000–2003
Željko Tomac	2003
Ratko Balenović	2003–2005
Josip Šojat	2005–2007
Zdravko Zovko	2007–2010
Vladimir Canjuga	2010–2015
Goran Mrđen	2015–2017
Nenad Šoštarić	2017–2023
Ivica Obrvan	2023–present

== See also ==
- Croatia men's national handball team
- Croatia national beach handball team
- Croatia women's national beach handball team
