= Alexandra Subțirică =

Romanian handball player (born 1987)

Personal information
- Full name: Alexandra-Georgiana; Subțirică-Iovănescu
- Nationality: Romanian
- Born: 8 December 1987 (age 38) Constanța, Romania
- Height: 1.70 m (5 ft 7 in)

Sport
- Sport: Handball
- Position: Pivot
- Current club: Gloria Buzău
- Number: 6

Senior clubs
- Years: Team
- 2018–: Gloria Buzău
National team
Years	Team	Apps	(Gls)
2020–	Romania	6	(2)

Alexandra-Georgiana Subțirică-Iovănescu (born 8 December 1987) is a Romanian handball player who plays as a pivot for the Gloria Buzău and the Romanian national team.

She represented Romania at the 2020 European Women's Handball Championship.

== Achievements ==
- Cupa României :
  - Bronze Medalist: 2020

== Personal life ==
She's the daughter of the former international and long-term captain of Romania, Simona Iovănescu. Her father was Sevastian Iovănescu.
