= Ivana Lovrić =

Croatian handball player (born 1984)

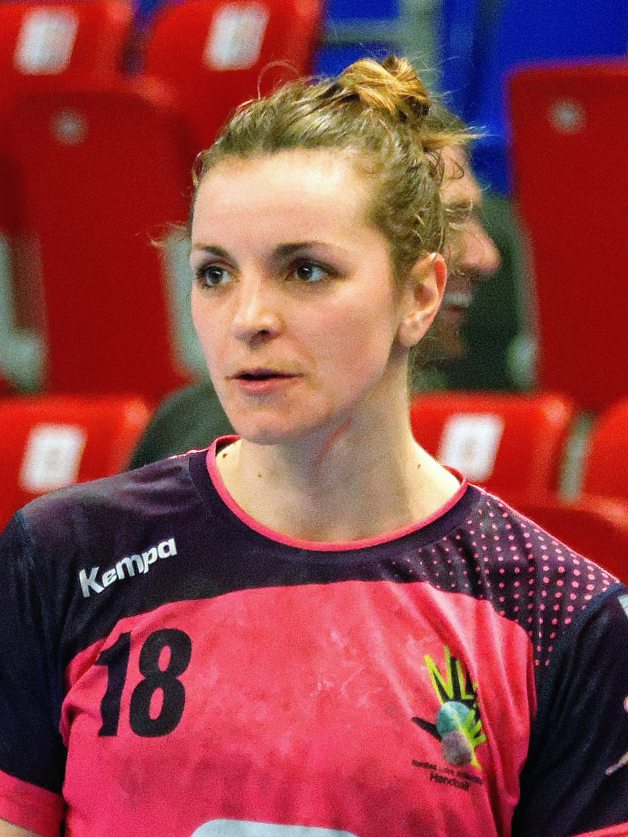

Personal information
- Nationality: Croatian
- Born: 1 September 1984 (age 42) Zagreb, SR Croatia, SFR Yugoslavia
- Height: 1.73 m (5 ft 8 in)

Sport
- Sport: Handball
- Position: Central back

Senior clubs
- Years: Team
- 2005–2008: Lokomotiva Zagreb
- 2008–2009: Metz Handball
- 2009–2010: Debreceni VSC
- 2010–2014: ŽRK Samobor
- 2014: Lokomotiva Zagreb
- 2014–2016: Nantes Handball
- 2016–2018: Sambre Avesnois
National team
Years	Team	Apps	(Gls)
–	Croatia	60	(81)
- Updated on 4 December 2012

Ivana Lovrić (born 1 September 1984) is a retired Croatian team handball player. She was played in the Croatian national team, and participated at the 2011 World Women's Handball Championship in Brazil and the 2012 Summer Olympics in London.

== Fatal car accident ==
On 28.October 2012, Lovrić was involved in a car accident in Zagreb. She ran into a 33-year-old woman crossing the road, and continued driving without stopping or notifying emergency services. She was found to have been under the influence of alcohol. Zagreb Municipal Criminal Court found her guilty and sentenced her to an 18 months' suspended jail sentence.
