= Marijeta Vidak =

Croatian handball player (born 1992)

Personal information
- Nationality: Croatian
- Born: 14 August 1992 (age 34) Virovitica, Croatia
- Height: 1.79 m (5 ft 10 in)

Sport
- Sport: Handball
- Position: Left back

Youth career
- Years: Team
- 2001–2008: ŽRK Tvin Trgocentar

Senior clubs
- Years: Team
- 2008–2018: RK Podravka
- 2012: → ŽRK Zelina (loan)
- 2018–2019: SCM Gloria Buzău
- 2020–2021: ŽRK Umag
- 2021: Fleury Loiret HB
National team
Years	Team	Apps	(Gls)
–	Croatia	29	(18)
Medal record
Women's Handball
Representing Croatia
European Championship
Bronze medal – third place	2020 Denmark
- Updated on 19 April 2024

Marijeta Šarlija (née Vidak; born 14 August 1992) is a retired Croatian handball player who was last played for Fleury Loiret HB and the Croatian national team.

She represented Croatia at the 2016 European Women's Handball Championship and the 2020 European Women's Handball Championship where Croatia took bronze medals.
