= Josipa Mamić =

Croatian handballer (born 1996)

Personal information
- Nationality: Croatian
- Born: 7 January 1996 (age 30) Zagreb, Croatia
- Height: 1.65 m (5 ft 5 in)

Sport
- Sport: Handball
- Position: Right wing
- Current club: RK Podravka Koprivnica
- Number: 96

Youth career
- Years: Team
- –: ŽRK Dugo Selo '55

Senior clubs
- Years: Team
- 2011–2018: ŽRK Dugo Selo '55
- 2018–2021: ŽRK Bjelovar
- 2021–2022: RK Lokomotiva Zagreb
- 2022–2023: HC Dunărea Brăila
- 2023–: RK Podravka Koprivnica
National team
Years	Team	Apps	(Gls)
2020–	Croatia	24	(39)
Medal record
Women's Handball
Representing Croatia
European Championship
Bronze medal – third place	2020 Denmark
- Updated on 19 November 2024

Josipa Mamić (born 7 January 1996) is a Croatian handballer for RK Podravka Koprivnica and the Croatian national team.

She represented Croatia at the 2020 European Women's Handball Championship.

She comes from Dugo Selo.
