= Tena Japundža =

Croatian handballer (born 1998)

Personal information
- Nationality: Croatian
- Born: 28 October 1998 (age 27) Pula, Croatia
- Height: 1.73 m (5 ft 8 in)

Sport
- Sport: Handball
- Position: Right wing
- Current club: ŽRK Ivanić
- Number: 17

Senior clubs
- Years: Team
- –2016: ŽRK Rovinj
- 2016–2017: ŽRK Umag
- 2017–2026: RK Lokomotiva Zagreb
- 2026–: ŽRK Ivanić
National team
Years	Team	Apps	(Gls)
2020–2022	Croatia	26	(32)
Medal record
Women's Handball
Representing Croatia
European Championship
Bronze medal – third place	2020 Denmark
Mediterranean Games
Silver medal – second place	2022 Oran	Team

Tena Japundža (born 28 October 1998) is a Croatian handballer for ŽRK Ivanić and formerly for the Croatian national team.

She represented Croatia at the 2020 European Women's Handball Championship where Croatia surprisingly won bronze medals.

== International honours ==
- EHF European Cup:
  - Runner-up: 2021
