= Kristina Prkačin =

Croatian handball player (born 1997)

Personal information
- Nationality: Croatian
- Born: 21 October 1997 (age 29) Dubrovnik, Croatia
- Height: 1.83 m (6 ft 0 in)

Sport
- Sport: Handball
- Position: Left back
- Current club: RK Lokomotiva Zagreb
- Number: 88

Senior clubs
- Years: Team
- 2012–2015: ŽRK Dubrovnik
- 2015–2016: ŽRK Trešnjevka Zagreb
- 2016–2021: RK Lokomotiva Zagreb
- 2021–2022: Szombathelyi KKA
- 2022: RK Lokomotiva Zagreb
- 2022–2023: Gloria Buzău
- 2023–2024: RK Lokomotiva Zagreb
- 2024–2026: RK Podravka Koprivnica
- 2026–: RK Lokomotiva Zagreb
National team
| Years | Team | Apps | (Gls) |
| 2018– | Croatia | 68 | (68) |
Medal record
Women's Handball
Representing Croatia
European Championship
| Bronze medal – third place | 2020 Denmark |
- Updated on 29 October 2026

Kristina Prkačin (born 21 October 1997) is a Croatian handball player for RK Lokomotiva Zagreb and the Croatian national team.

She participated at the 2018 European Women's Handball Championship.

== International honours ==
- EHF European Cup:
  - Winner: 2017
  - Runner-up: 2021
