= Vladimir Canjuga =

Croatian handball coach

Personal information
- Nationality: Croatian
- Born: 3 April 1960 (age 66)

Sport
- Sport: Handball

Teams managed
- Years: Team
- 2010–2015: Croatia

Vladimir Canjuga (born 3 April 1960) is a Croatian handball coach. He coaches the Croatia women's national handball team, and participated at the 2011 World Women's Handball Championship in Brazil, and at the 2014 European Women's Handball Championship.
