= Andrea Šimara =

Croatian handballer (born 1997)

Personal information
- Nationality: Croatian
- Born: 13 July 1997 (age 29) Zagreb, Croatia
- Height: 1.71 m (5 ft 7 in)

Sport
- Sport: Handball
- Position: Left wing
- Current club: RK Podravka Koprivnica
- Number: 50

Senior clubs
- Years: Team
- –2018: ŽRK Trešnjevka Zagreb
- 2018–2022: RK Lokomotiva Zagreb
- 2022–: RK Podravka Koprivnica
National team
Years	Team	Apps	(Gls)
2020–	Croatia	75	(139)
Medal record
Women's Handball
Representing Croatia
European Championship
Bronze medal – third place	2020 Denmark
Mediterranean Games
Silver medal – second place	2022 Oran	Team
- Updated on 29 October 2026

Andrea Šimara (born 13 July 1997) is a Croatian handballer for RK Podravka Koprivnica and the Croatian national team.

She represented Croatia at the 2020 European Women's Handball Championship where Croatia surprisingly took bronze medals.

== International honours ==
- EHF European Cup:
  - Runner-up: 2021
