= Željko Tomac =

Croatian handball player (born 1956)

Personal information
- Nationality: Croatian
- Born: 20 June 1956 (age 70) Rijeka, SR Croatia, SFR Yugoslavia

Sport
- Sport: Handball
- Current club: None
- Number: 2

Youth career
- Years: Team
- 1970–1973: Partizan Zamet

Senior clubs
- Years: Team
- 1973–1983: Zamet Rijeka
Title
2002–present	Coaching staff	NHF

Teams managed
- 1981–1986: Zamet Rijeka
- 1986–1989: Wing
- 1986–1989: Trygg/Lade
- 1989–1991: Freidig
- 1991–1996: Sjetne
- 1996–1999: Heimdal
- 1999–2002: Bækkelagets SK
- 2003: Croatia women
- 2010–present: Norway (assistant coach)
Medal record
Representing Norway
World Championship
Silver medal – second place	2017 France	Coach
Silver medal – second place	2019 Denmark & Germany	Coach

Željko Tomac (born 20 June 1956) is a former Croatian handball player. He is currently assistant coach of the Norway men's national handball team.

== Career ==
Tomac made his senior debut for RK Zamet in 1973. In 1977 Tomac and his side entered the Yugoslav Second League finishing first in the Yugoslav Third League. Zamet was named the Croatian champions. The next season they finished first in the Yugoslav Second League and entered the First League. Tomac spent one season in the First League, Zamet was relegated finishing in last place. The next season Zamet tried to make a comeback but finished second and didn't get promoted to the First League. In 1981 Tomac became the head coach of RK Zamet while still actively playing with the team until 1983. Tomac was head coach of Zamet until the end of the 1985-86 season.

In 1986 Tomac moved to Norway and he coached the male handballers of Wing until 1989. Tomac helped Wing enter the Norwegian top division Grundigligaen.

From 1989 to 1991 Tomac was the coach of male handball club Trygg Lade and female handball club Freidig at the same time. From 1991 to 1996 Tomac was the coach of female team Sjetne IL. Tomac led the team to the play-offs in 1993 and they ended up Norwegian champions. The next season his team participated in the EHF Cup and they reached the 1/8 finals where they lost to CB Amadeo Tortajada.

From 1996 to 1999 he was the coach of male team Heimdal.

From 1999 to 2002 Tomac was the coach of Bækkelagets SK with whom he won the Norwegian Cup in 2001. With the club he got to the quarter-finals of the EHF Champions League twice and to the semi-final of the EHF Cup.

In 2002 Tomac became an employee of the Norwegian Handball Federation.

In 2003 Tomac was selected to be the head coach of the Croatia women's national handball team for the 2003 World Women's Handball Championship which was hosted in Croatia. Croatia was eliminated during the group stage finishing in 14th place.

Since 2010 he's been the assistant coach of the male national team of Norway. He has helped the national team to at the 2011 World Championship where they finished in 9th place, the 2012 European Championship where they finished in 13th place, the 2014 European Championship where they finished 14th and the 2016 European Championship where they lost to Croatia in the third place match and finished fourth. In April 2016 Croatia even knocked them out in the qualification tournament for the 2016 Summer Olympics. A year later they would meet again in the semi-final and Norway defeated them 25:28 after extra time and secured themselves the first medal in their national team history as well as Tomac's first medal.

== Personal life ==
He is the father of handball players Marta Tomac and Teodora Tomac. Tomac also has a brother named Nikola.

== Honours ==
Player
Zamet

- Yugoslav Second League (1): 1977-78
- Yugoslav Third League (1): 1976-77

Coach
Zamet

- Team of the year - 1985 (awarded by Handball federation of Rijeka)

Sjetne

- Grundigligaen (1): 1992-93

Bækkelagets SK

- Norwegian Cup (1): 2001
