= Jana Šustková =

Czech handball player

Personal information
- Nationality: Czech
- Born: 10 January 1998 (age 28) Kyjov, Czech Republic
- Height: 1.77 m (5 ft 10 in)
- Weight: 63 kg (139 lb)

Sport
- Sport: Handball
- Position: Left back, Centre back
- Current club: HC Zlin
- Number: 15

Senior clubs
- Years: Team
- 2014–2018: SHK Veselí nad Moravou
- 2018–2021: DHK Baník Most
- 2021–2022: Dunaújvárosi Kohász KA
- 2022–2023: KGHM Zagłębie Lubin
- 2023–: HC Zlin
National team
Years	Team	Apps	(Gls)
2013–	Czech Republic	30	(27)
- Updated on 12 November 2023

Jana Šustková - Mlýnková (born 10 January 1998) is a Czech handball player for HC Zlin.

She participated at the 2018 and 2020 European Women's Handball Championship.
