= Galina Gabisova =

Russian handball player

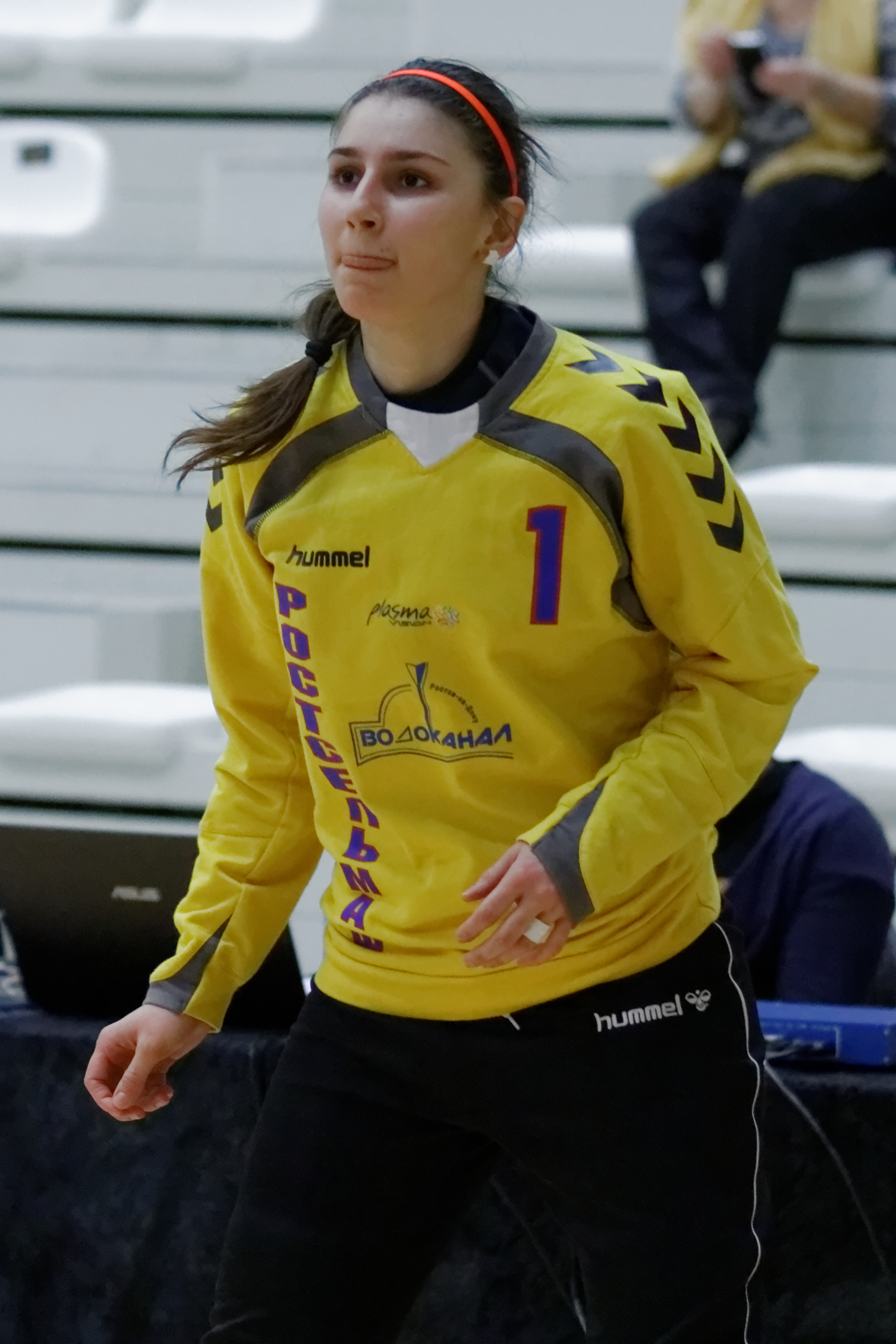

Personal information
- Full name: Galina Batrazovna Gabisova
- Nationality: Russian
- Born: 17 June 1985 (age 41) Rostov-on-Don, Russia
- Height: 1.80 m (5 ft 11 in)

Sport
- Sport: Handball
- Position: Goalkeeper
- Current club: Rostov-Don
- Number: 1

Senior clubs
- Years: Team
- 2001–: Rostov-Don
National team
Years	Team	Apps	(Gls)
2015–	Russia	24	(0)

Galina Batrazovna Gabisova (formerly Mekhdieva; born 17 June 1985), from 2015 until 2020 Galina Mekhdieva named, is a Russian handball goalkeeper for Rostov-Don and the Russian national team.

She represented Russia at the 2020 European Women's Handball Championship.

== International honours ==
- Russian Super League:
  - Winners: 2015, 2017, 2018, 2019
- Russian Cup:
  - Winners: 2007, 2008, 2012, 2013, 2015, 2016, 2017, 2018, 2019
- EHF Champions League:
  - Finalist: 2018/2019
  - Fourth place: 2017/2018
- Women's EHF Cup:
  - Winners: 2017
  - Runners-up: 2015
