= Lucija Bešen =

Croatian handballer (born 1998)

Personal information
- Nationality: Croatian
- Born: 29 March 1998 (age 28) Zagreb, Croatia
- Height: 1.82 m (6 ft 0 in)

Sport
- Sport: Handball
- Position: Goalkeeper
- Current club: RK Podravka Koprivnica
- Number: 98

Senior clubs
- Years: Team
- 2014–2019: RK Sesvete Agroproteinka
- 2019–2022: RK Lokomotiva Zagreb
- 2022–: RK Podravka Koprivnica
National team
Years	Team	Apps	(Gls)
2019–	Croatia	83	(2)
Medal record
Women's Handball
Representing Croatia
European Championship
Bronze medal – third place	2020 Denmark
Mediterranean Games
Silver medal – second place	2022 Oran	Team
- Updated on 29 October 2026

Lucija Bešen (born 29 March 1998) is a Croatian handballer for RK Podravka Koprivnica and the Croatian national team.

She represented Croatia at the 2020 European Women's Handball Championship and at the 2025 World Women's Handball Championship.

Her older sister Gabrijela Bartulović (née Bešen) is also a handball player and, like Lucija, also plays as a goalkeeper.

== International honours ==
- EHF European Cup:
  - Runner-up: 2021
