= Marta Tomac =

Norwegian-Croatian handball player (born 1990)

Personal information
- Nationality: Norwegian; Croatian
- Born: 20 September 1990 (age 36) Trondheim, Norway
- Height: 1.79 m (5 ft 10 in)

Sport
- Sport: Handball
- Position: Centre back
- Current club: Vipers Kristiansand
- Number: 22

Senior clubs
- Years: Team
- 2006–2010: Selbu IL
- 2010–2011: SK Aarhus
- 2011–2015: Byåsen HE
- 2015–01/2025: Vipers Kristiansand
National team
Years	Team	Apps	(Gls)
2009	Croatia	11	(?)
2015–2021	Norway	88	(78)
Medal record
Olympic Games
Bronze medal – third place	2020 Tokyo	Team
World Championship
Gold medal – first place	2015 Denmark
European Championship
Gold medal – first place	2016 Sweden
Gold medal – first place	2020 Denmark

Marta Tomac (born 20 September 1990) is a Norwegian-Croatian professional handball player for Vipers Kristiansand and the Norwegian national team.

She made her debut on the Norwegian national team in 2015. At her first major international tournament, the 2016 European Women's Handball Championship, she won gold medals.

Previously in her career she played 11 matches for the Croatian national team, and got a Norwegian citizenship in October 2015.

== Personal life ==
She is the daughter of handball coach Željko Tomac.

== Achievements ==
- Olympic Games:
  - Bronze: 2020
- European Championship
  - Winner: 2016, 2020
- World Championship:
  - Winner: 2015
- EHF Champions League:
  - Winner: 2020/2021, 2021/2022, 2022/2023
  - Bronze medalist: 2018/2019
- EHF Cup:
  - Finalist: 2018
- Norwegian League:
  - Winner: 2017/2018, 2018/2019, 2019/2020, 2020/2021, 2021/2022, 2022/2023, 2023/2024
  - Silver: 2016/2017
- Norwegian Cup:
  - Winner: 2017, 2018, 2019, 2020, 2021, 2022/23, 2023/24
