= Marta Gęga =

Polish handball player (born 1986)

Personal information
- Nationality: Polish
- Born: 16 April 1986 (age 40) Bielawa, Poland
- Height: 1.84 m (6 ft 0 in)

Sport
- Sport: Handball
- Position: Left back
- Current club: Retired
- Number: 10

Senior clubs
- Years: Team
- 2005-2009: Carlos-Astol Jelenia Góra
- 2009-2010: Le Havre HAC
- 2010-2011: CJF Fleury Loiret
- 2011-2013: Cergy Handball
- 2013-2022: MKS Lublin
- 2022-2023: Start Elbląg
- 2024: KPR Ruch Chorzów
National team
Years	Team	Apps	(Gls)
2007-2021	Poland	75	(111)

Marta Gęga (born 16 April 1986) is a Polish former handballer for the Polish national team.

She represented Poland at the 2020 European Women's Handball Championship.
