= Ana Debelić =

Croatian handball player (born 1994)

Personal information
- Nationality: Croatian
- Born: 9 January 1994 (age 32) Rijeka, Croatia
- Height: 1.82 m (6 ft 0 in)

Sport
- Sport: Handball
- Position: Pivot
- Current club: RK Podravka Koprivnica
- Number: 31

Senior clubs
- Years: Team
- –2012: ŽRK Zamet
- 2012–2014: RK Lokomotiva Zagreb
- 2014–2015: ŽRK Zelina
- 2015–2016: RK Lokomotiva Zagreb
- 2016–2020: RK Podravka Koprivnica
- 2020–2021: HC Astrakhanochka
- 2021–01/2025: Vipers Kristiansand
- 02/2025–: RK Podravka Koprivnica
National team
Years	Team	Apps	(Gls)
–2025	Croatia	70	(100)
Medal record
Women's Handball
Representing Croatia
European Championship
Bronze medal – third place	2020 Denmark

Ana Debelić (born 9 January 1994) is a Croatian professional handball player for RK Podravka Koprivnica and formerly for the Croatian national team.

== Career ==
She started playing handball at the age of six. After enrolling in high school in Rijeka, she played for Opatija and ŽRK Zamet. She debuted at senior level in 2012 for ŽRK Zamet. She joined league rivals RK Lokomotiva Zagreb for her second senior season. In 2014 she won the Croatian championship and the Croatian cup with the club. The summer after she joined league rivals ŽRK Zelina for year, before she returned to RK Lokomotiva Zagreb. A year later she joined RK Podravka Koprivnica. Here she won the Croatian Championship again in 2017, 2018 and 2019.

In 2020 she joined Russian side HC Astrakhanochka. A year later she joined Norwegian side Vipers Kristiansand. Here she won the 2022, 2023 and 2024 Norwegian Championship and the EHF Champions League in 2022 and 2023 where Debelić had one of important roles both in defence and attack.

She left Vipers following the bankruptcy of the club in January 2025.

Debelić played for Croatia at four European Championships in 2016 in Sweden, 2018 in France, 2020 in Denmark and 2022 in Slovenia and at World Championship in 2021 in Spain. She won a bronze medal at the 2020 championship in Denmark and was chosen in the All-star team for the tournament.

She was nominated 3 years in a row for the best world line player according to Handball Planet., ,

== Achievements ==
- EHF Champions League:
  - Winner: 2021/22, 2022/23
- Norwegian League:
  - Winner: 2021/22, 2022/23, 2023/24
- Norwegian Cup:
  - Winner: 2021/22, 2022/23, 2023/24
- Croatian league:
  - Winner: 2014, 2017, 2018, 2019, 2025, 2026
- Croatian Handball Cup:
  - Winner: 2014, 2017, 2019, 2025, 2026
- Russian Handball Cup:
  - Bronze medalist: 2021

== Individual awards ==
- All-Star Line Player of the European Championship: 2020
- Croatian Player of the Year: 2021, 2022
