= Katarina Ježić =

Croatian handball player (born 1992)

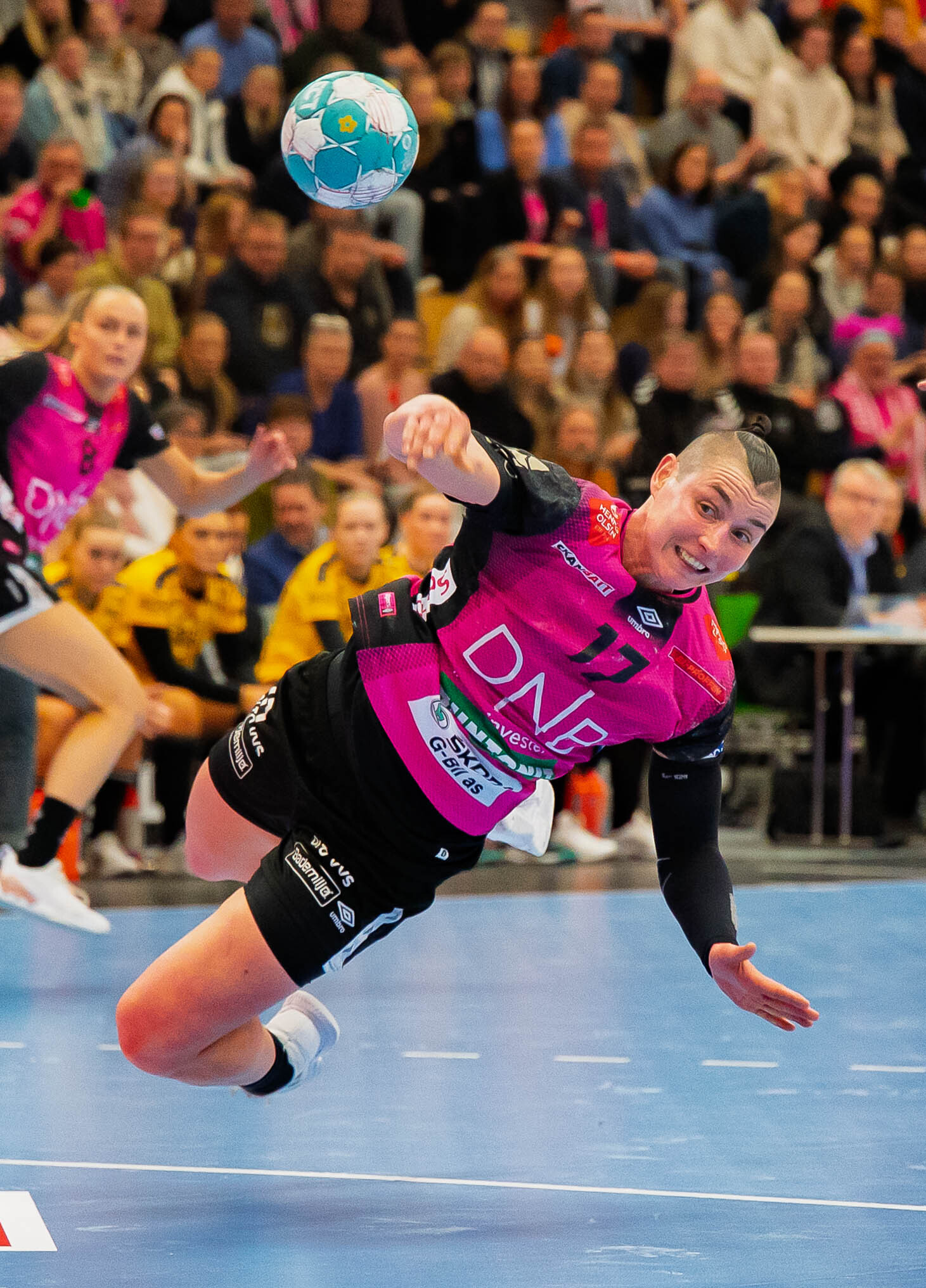
- For Vipers Kristiansand in the National Championship final against Sola, 2023

Personal information
- Nationality: Croatian
- Born: 19 December 1992 (age 33) Rijeka, Croatia
- Height: 1.73 m (5 ft 8 in)

Sport
- Sport: Handball
- Position: Pivot
- Current club: HC Dunărea Brăila
- Number: 17

Youth career
- Years: Team
- Vinodol Novi Vinodolski
- 2007–2009: RK Orijent Rijeka

Senior clubs
- Years: Team
- 2009–2011: Zamet
- 2011–2012: Lokomotiva Zagreb
- 2012–2014: Budućnost Podgorica
- 2014–2015: Lokomotiva Zagreb
- 2015–2016: Baia Mare
- 2016–2022: Siófok KC
- 2022–2023: Kastamonu
- 2023: Vipers Kristiansand
- 2023–: HC Dunărea Brăila
National team
Years	Team	Apps	(Gls)
2011–	Croatia	130	(285)
Medal record
Women's Handball
Representing Croatia
European Championship
Bronze medal – third place	2020 Denmark
Mediterranean Games
Bronze medal – third place	2013 Mersin	Team
- Updated on 29 October 2026

Katarina Ježić (born 19 December 1992) is a Croatian handball player for HC Dunărea Brăila and the Croatian national team.

She participated at the 2011 World Women's Handball Championship in Brazil.

== Achievements ==
- EHF Champions League:
  - Winner: 2022/23
- EHF European League:
  - Winner: 2018/19
- Norwegian League:
  - Winner: 2022/23
- Norwegian Cup:
  - Winner: 2022/23

== Individual awards ==
- Handball-Planet.com World Best Young Female Line Player: 2013–14
