= Klaudija Bubalo =

Croatian handball player (born 1970)

Personal information
- Nationality: Croatian
- Born: 17 March 1970 (age 56)

Sport
- Sport: Handball

Senior clubs
- Years: Team
- –1999: RK Lokomotiva Zagreb
- 1999–2003: Metz Handball
- 2003–????: RK Salonastit Vranjic
National team
Years	Team	Apps	(Gls)
–	Croatia	166	(769)
Medal record
Women's handball
Representing Yugoslavia
World Championship
Silver medal – second place	1990 South Korea	Team
Mediterranean Games
Gold medal – first place	1991 Athens	Team
Representing Croatia
Mediterranean Games
Gold medal – first place	1993 Languedoc-Roussillon	Team
Silver medal – second place	1997 Bari	Team

Klaudija Bubalo (née Klikovac; born 17 March 1970) is a retired Croatian handball player, who played for the clubs RK Lokomotiva Zagreb and Metz Handball.

While playing for Kraš Zagreb, her club reached the final in the 1997–98 EHF Women's Cup Winners' Cup.

She represented Croatia at the 1997 World Women's Handball Championship, when Croatia placed 6th.
