= Marta Batinović =

Croatian handball player (born 1990)

Personal information
- Nationality: Croatian; Montenegrin
- Born: 20 April 1990 (age 36) Metković, SR Croatia, SFR Yugoslavia
- Height: 1.84 m (6 ft 0 in)

Sport
- Sport: Handball
- Position: Goalkeeper
- Current club: SCM Gloria Buzău
- Number: 43

Youth career
- Years: Team
- 1998–2006: RK Dalmatinka Ploče

Senior clubs
- Years: Team
- 2006–2013: RK Podravka
- 2013–2018: ŽRK Budućnost
- 2019–2021: SCM Râmnicu Vâlcea
- 2021–: Gloria Buzău
National team
Years	Team	Apps	(Gls)
2011–2015	Croatia	52	(0)
2019–2025	Montenegro	47	(1)
Medal record
European Championship
Bronze medal – third place	2022 Slovenia/North Macedonia/Montenegro

Marta Batinović née Žderić; (born 20 April 1990) is a Croatian-born Montenegrin female handball player who plays as a goalkeeper for SCM Gloria Buzău and the Montenegrin national team.

== International honours ==
- EHF Champions League:
  - Winner: 2015
  - Finalist: 2014
  - Fourth place: 2016, 2017

== Individual awards ==
- Croatian Player of the Year: 2015
