= Goran Mrđen =

Croatian handball coach

Personal information
- Born: Virovitica, SFR Yugoslavia

Sport
- Sport: Handball

Teams managed
- Years: Team
- 1990–1997: Graničar (assistant)
- 1998–2003: ŽRK Tvin Virovitica
- 2000–2005: Croatia U19
- 2003–2004: RK Podravka Koprivnica
- 2004–2005: Croatia (w) assistant
- 2008–2011: ŽRK Tvin Virovitica
- 2011: Croatia U19
- 2011–2013: RK Zelina
- 2013: Croatia U19
- 2013-2017: RK Podravka Koprivnica
- 2015–2017: Croatia
- 2017–2021: ŽRK Zrinski Čakovec
- 2021–2022: RK Podravka Koprivnica
- 2022–2024: ŽRK Zrinski Čakovec

Goran Mrđen is a Croatian handball coach. He was the head coach of the Croatia women's national handball team from 2015 to 2017, and coached the team at the 2016 European Championship.

He has also coached RK Podravka Koprivnica on several occasions, where he was won the Croatian Cup in 2003/04, 2014/15, 2015/16, 2016/17, and 2021/22 and the Croatian league in 2014/15, 2015/16, and 2016/17.
