= Tea Pijević =

Croatian handball player (born 1991)

Personal information
- Nationality: Croatian
- Born: 18 November 1991 (age 34) Makarska, Croatia
- Height: 1.72 m (5 ft 8 in)

Sport
- Sport: Handball
- Position: Goalkeeper
- Current club: RK Lokomotiva Zagreb
- Number: 91

Senior clubs
- Years: Team
- –2012: RK Dalmatinka Ploče
- 2012: ŽRK Borac Banja Luka
- 2013–2015: RK Sesvete Agroproteinka
- 2015–2020: RK Lokomotiva Zagreb
- 2020: Metz Handball
- 2020–2023: Alba Fehérvár KC
- 2023–2025: Gloria Buzău
- 2025–: RK Lokomotiva Zagreb
National team
Years	Team	Apps	(Gls)
2017-	Croatia	62	(2)
Medal record
Women's Handball
Representing Croatia
European Championship
Bronze medal – third place	2020 Denmark
- Updated on 9 January 2025

Tea Pijević (born 18 November 1991) is a Croatian handball player for RK Lokomotiva Zagreb and the Croatian national team.

She participated at the 2018 European Women's Handball Championship and the 2020 European Women's Handball Championship where Croatia took bronze medals.

She comes from the Stablina neighborhood of Ploče.

== International honours ==
- EHF Challenge Cup:
  - Winner: 2017
