= Valentina Blažević =

Croatian handball player (born 1994)

Personal information
- Nationality: Croatian
- Born: 14 February 1994 (age 32) Split, Croatia
- Height: 1.70 m (5 ft 7 in)

Sport
- Sport: Handball
- Position: Centre back
- Current club: CSM Târgu Mureș
- Number: 77

Senior clubs
- Years: Team
- –2013: RK Dalmatinka Ploče
- 2013–2016: RK Sesvete Agroproteinka
- 2016–2017: RK Krim
- 2017–2019: Pogoń Baltica Szczecin
- 2019–2020: MKS Lublin
- 2020–2022: CS Măgura Cisnădie
- 2022–2024: Gloria Buzău
- 2024–2026: SCM Craiova
- 2026–: CSM Târgu Mureș
National team
Years	Team	Apps	(Gls)
2016–	Croatia	73	(191)
Medal record
Women's Handball
Representing Croatia
European Championship
Bronze medal – third place	2020 Denmark
- Updated on 19 November 2024

Valentina Duilo (née Blažević; born 14 February 1994) is a Croatian handball player for CSM Târgu Mureș and the Croatian national team.

She participated at the 2016, the 2018 and the 2020 European Women's Handball Championship where Croatia took bronze medals.

She is originally from Knin.
