= Emily Stang Sando =

Norwegian handball player (born 1989)

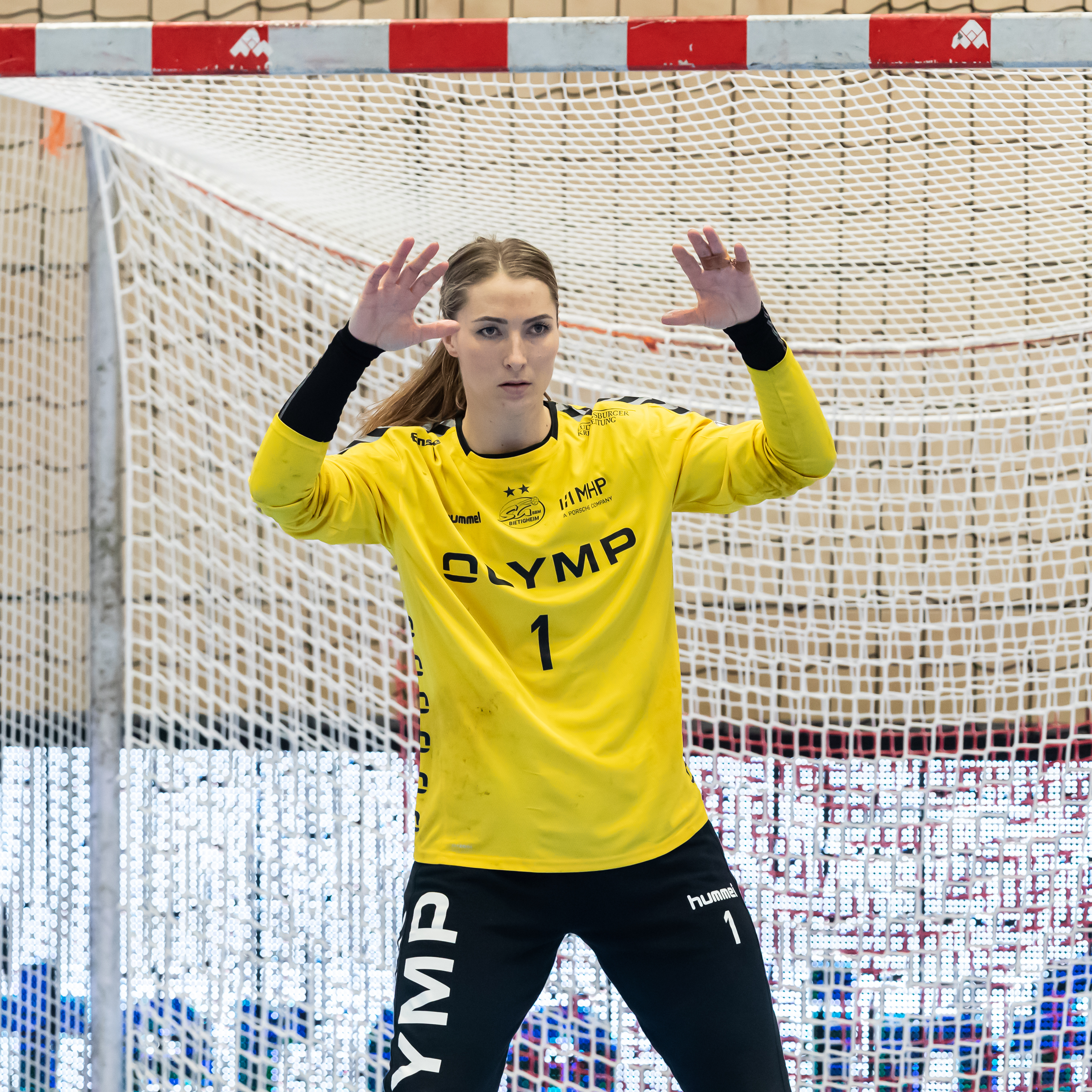

Personal information
- Nationality: Norwegian
- Born: 8 March 1989 (age 37) Tønsberg, Norway
- Height: 1.80 m (5 ft 11 in)

Sport
- Sport: Handball
- Position: Goalkeeper
- Current club: HØJ Elite
- Number: 89

Senior clubs
- Years: Team
- 2006–2010: Larvik HK
- 2010–2013: Flint Tønsberg
- 2013–2017: Team Esbjerg
- 2017–2018: HC Odense
- 2018–2019: København Håndbold
- 2019–2020: ŽRK Budućnost
- 2020–2021: SG BBM Bietigheim
- 2021–2024: HH Elite
- 01/2025–06/2025: Ikast Håndbold
- 2025–: HØJ Elite
National team
Years	Team	Apps	(Gls)
2010–2020	Norway	30	(0)
Medal record
European Championship
Gold medal – first place	2014 Croatia/Hungary
Gold medal – first place	2020 Denmark

Emily Stang Sando (born 8 March 1989) is a Norwegian handball goalkeeper for HØJ Elite and formerly the Norwegian national team.

In 2016 she was part of the Team Esbjerg side that won the Danish Championship for the first time in club history. She played for HH Elite until 2024. From February 2024 until the end of the season, she took a break from handball due to pregnancy leave. She was replaced by Brazilian goalkeeper Mayssa Pessoa.

She made her international debut in 2010.

She won a gold meal with Norway at the 2014 European Women's Handball Championship in Hungary/Croatia. She was part of the Norwegian squad from start at the 2020 European Women's Handball Championship, and later replaced by Katrine Lunde.

== Achievements ==
- European Championship:
  - Winner: 2014, 2020
