= Rikke Granlund =

Norwegian handball player (born 1989)

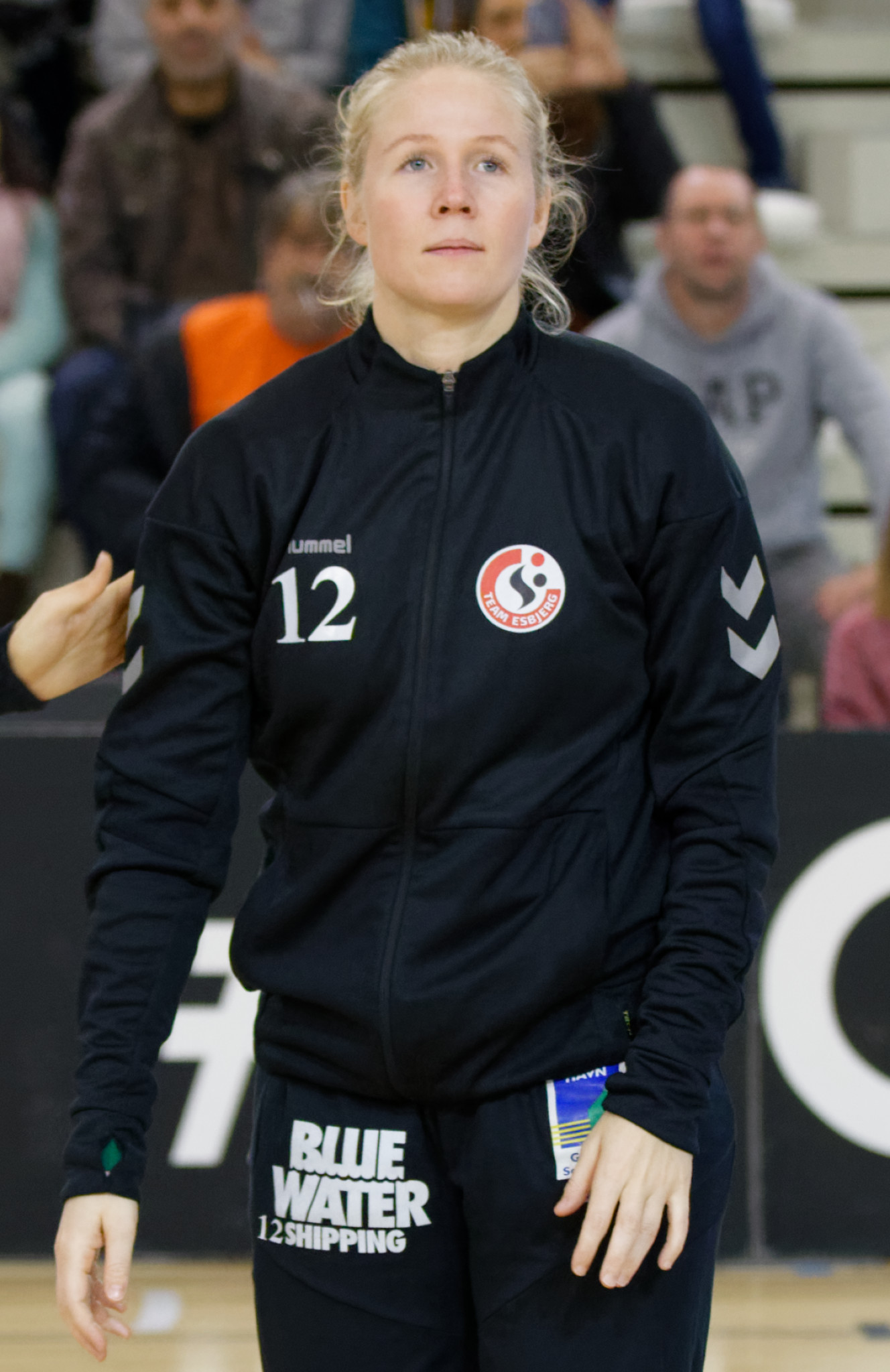

Personal information
- Full name: Rikke Marie Granlund
- Nationality: Norwegian
- Born: 14 November 1989 (age 36) Oslo, Norway
- Height: 1.72 m (5 ft 8 in)

Sport
- Sport: Handball
- Position: Goalkeeper
- Current club: Sola HK
- Number: 12

Senior clubs
- Years: Team
- 2009–2010: Nordstrand IF
- 2010–2012: Bækkelagets SK
- 2012–2016: Nordstrand IF
- 2016–2017: Halden HK
- 2017–2018: Oppsal
- 2018–2021: Team Esbjerg
- 2021–2023: Chambray Touraine Handball
- 2023–: Sola HK
National team
Years	Team	Apps	(Gls)
2020–	Norway	16	(0)
Medal record
World Championship
Gold medal – first place	2021 Spain
European Championship
Gold medal – first place	2020 Denmark

Rikke Marie Granlund (born 14 November 1989) is a Norwegian handball player for Sola HK and the Norwegian national team. She is a world Champion from 2021 and a European Champion from 2020.

She was also selected to represent Norway at the 2020 IHF Women's Olympic Qualification Tournaments.

== Achievements ==
- European Championship:
  - Winner: 2020
- Norwegian League
  - Winner: 2025/26
  - Silver: 2024/25
  - Bronze: 2023/24
- Danish Championship:
  - Winner: 2018/19, 2019/20
- EHF Cup:
  - Finalist: 2019
