= Dora Krsnik =

Croatian handball player (born 1992)

Personal information
- Nationality: Croatian
- Born: 19 January 1992 (age 34) Zagreb, Croatia
- Height: 1.70 m (5 ft 7 in)

Sport
- Sport: Handball
- Position: Centre back

Senior clubs
- Years: Team
- –2014: RK Lokomotiva Zagreb
- 2014–2015: ŽRK Zelina
- 2015–2018: RK Podravka Koprivnica
- 2018–2019: RK Krim
- 2019–2022: HB Plan de Cuques
- 2022–2024: CS Mioveni
- 2024–2025: CS Judetean Prahova
- 2025–2026: ŽRK Zrinski Čakovec
National team
Years	Team	Apps	(Gls)
–	Croatia	51	(97)
Medal record
Women's Handball
Representing Croatia
European Championship
Bronze medal – third place	2020 Denmark

Dora Krsnik (born 19 January 1992) is a retired Croatian handball player who was last played for Croatian club ŽRK Zrinski Čakovec and the Croatian national team.

She participated at the 2016, 2018, and the 2020 European Women's Handball Championship where Croatia took bronze medals.
