= Dora Kalaus =

Croatian handballer (born 1996)

Dora Kalaus Žulj
Personal information
- Full name: Dorotea Kalaus Žulj
- Nationality: Croatian
- Born: 24 June 1996 (age 30) Zagreb, Croatia
- Height: 1.72 m (5 ft 8 in)

Sport
- Sport: Handball
- Position: Right back

Senior clubs
- Years: Team
- –2013: RK Podravka Koprivnica
- 2013–2015: ŽRK Koka Varaždin
- 2015–2022: RK Lokomotiva Zagreb
- 2022–2024: RK Podravka Koprivnica
National team
Years	Team	Apps	(Gls)
–	Croatia	45	(15)
Medal record
Women's Handball
Representing Croatia
European Championship
Bronze medal – third place	2020 Denmark
- Updated on 6 October 2024

Dorotea "Dora" Kalaus Žulj (born 24 June 1996) is a retired Croatian handballer who was last played for RK Podravka Koprivnica and the Croatian national team.

She represented Croatia at the 2020 European Women's Handball Championship where Croatia surprisingly took bronze medals.

== International honours ==
- EHF European Cup:
  - Winner: 2017
  - Runner-up: 2021

== Personal life ==
She has an identical twin sister named Larissa Kalaus who was also handball player.
