= Ćamila Mičijević =

Croatian handball player (born 1994)

Personal information
- Nationality: Croatian
- Born: 8 September 1994 (age 32) Heidenheim, Germany
- Height: 1.94 m (6 ft 4 in)

Sport
- Sport: Handball
- Position: Left back

Youth career
- Years: Team
- –2009: Lokomotiva Mostar
- 2009–2011: Katarina Mostar

Senior clubs
- Years: Team
- 2011–2016: ŽRK Zamet
- 2016–2020: Dunaújvárosi Kohász KA
- 2020–2023: Metz Handball
- 2023–2024: Paris 92
- 2024–2026: SCM Craiova
National team
| Years | Team | Apps | (Gls) |
| 2014- | Croatia | 67 | (204) |
Medal record
Women's Handball
Representing Croatia
European Championship
| Bronze medal – third place | 2020 Denmark |
- Updated on 19 November 2024

Ćamila Mičijević (born 8 September 1994) is a Croatian handball player who recently played for SCM Craiova and the Croatian national team.

== Career ==
Mičijević was born in Heidenheim, Germany to Bosnian immigrants who fled from the Bosnian War. Her parents, Mujo and Jasminka Mičijević, come from Mostar, Bosnia and Herzegovina.

She played at both Lokomotiva and Katarina handball clubs in Mostar before moving to play at Zamet in Croatia, later Dunaújváros in Hungary and Metz in France in 2020. She rose to prominence at the 2020 European Women's Handball Championship where she won the bronze medal with Croatia, as one of the team leaders.

== Achievements ==
=== National ===
- French Women's Handball Championship:
  - Winner: 2022, 2023
- Coupe de France:
  - Winner: 2022, 2023
