= Larissa Kalaus =

Croatian handball player (born 1996)

Personal information
- Nationality: Croatian
- Born: 24 June 1996 (age 30) Zagreb, Croatia
- Height: 1.73 m (5 ft 8 in)

Sport
- Sport: Handball
- Position: Left back

Senior clubs
- Years: Team
- –2013: RK Podravka Koprivnica
- 2013–2015: ŽRK Koka Varaždin
- 2015–2021: RK Lokomotiva Zagreb
- 2021–2024: RK Podravka Koprivnica
- 2024–2026: Kisvárdai KC
National team
Years	Team	Apps	(Gls)
–2026	Croatia	55	(117)
Medal record
Women's Handball
Representing Croatia
European Championship
Bronze medal – third place	2020 Denmark
- Updated on 19 November 2024

Larissa Marković (née Kalaus; 24 June 1996) is a retired Croatian handballer who was last played for Kisvárdai KC and the Croatian national team.

She participated in the 2018 European Women's Handball Championship and the 2020 European Women's Handball Championship where Croatia took bronze medals.

She represented Croatia in 55 international matches; she played her last match on 12 April 2026, against Kosovo in qualifiers for the 2026 European Championship.

== International honours ==
- EHF European Cup:
  - Winner: 2017
  - Runner-up: 2021

== Individual awards ==
- EHF European Cup Top Scorer: 2017, 2021

== Personal life ==
She has an identical twin sister, Dora Kalaus, who was also handball player.
