= Nataša Ljepoja =

Slovenian handball player

Personal information
- Nationality: Slovenian
- Born: 28 January 1996 (age 30) Celje, Slovenia
- Height: 1.78 m (5 ft 10 in)

Sport
- Sport: Handball
- Position: Pivot
- Current club: RK Podravka Koprivnica
- Number: 17

Senior clubs
- Years: Team
- 2014–2018: RK Zagorje
- 2018–2023: RK Krim
- 2023–2026: SCM Râmnicu Vâlcea
- 2026–: RK Podravka Koprivnica
National team
Years	Team	Apps	(Gls)
2019–	Slovenia	99	(217)
Medal record
Mediterranean Games
Bronze medal – third place	2018 Tarragona	Team
- Updated on 11 November 2026

Nataša Ljepoja (born 28 January 1996) is a Slovenian handball player for RK Podravka Koprivnica in Croatia and the Slovenian national team. She has previously played for the club RK Zagorje.

She represented Slovenia at the 2019 World Women's Handball Championship.
