= Ema Alivodić =

Montenegrin handball player (born 1995)

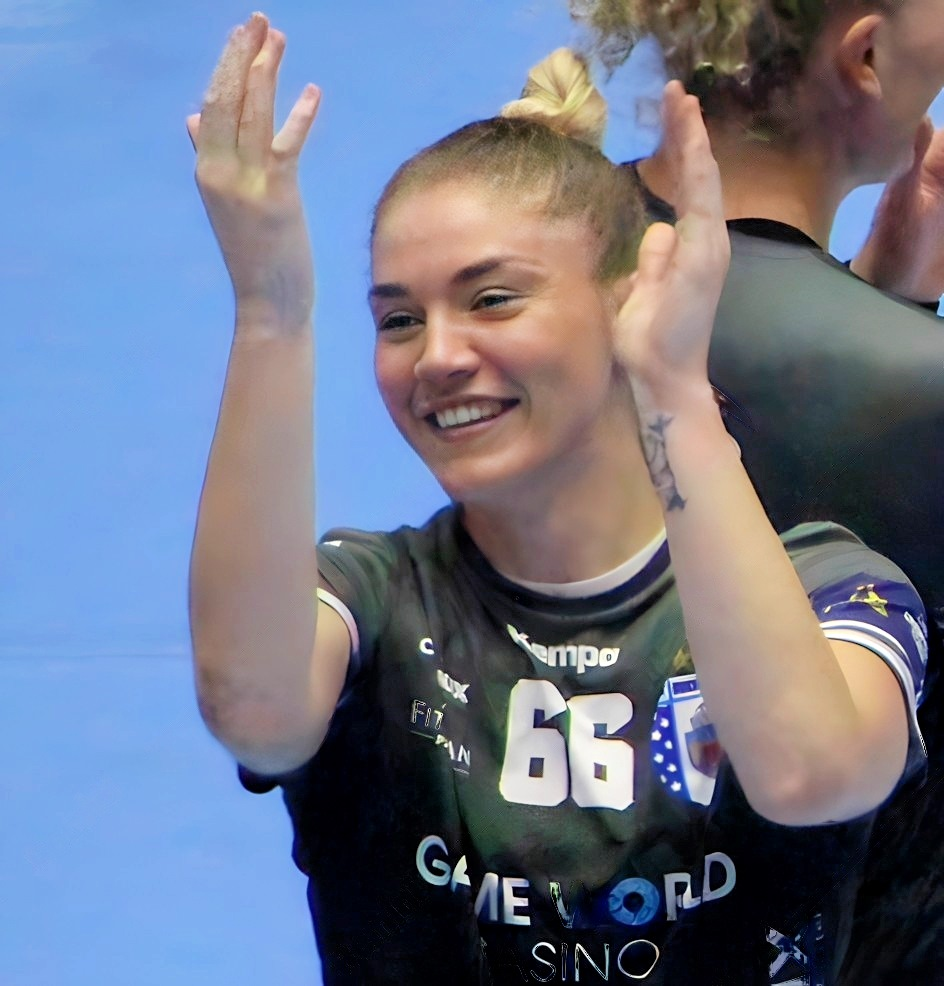

Personal information
- Nationality: Montenegrin
- Born: 28 November 1995 (age 30) Berane, Montenegro, FR Yugoslavia
- Height: 1.86 m (6 ft 1 in)

Sport
- Sport: Handball
- Position: Pivot
- Current club: CSM București
- Number: 66

Senior clubs
- Years: Team
- 2014–2021: ŽRK Budućnost Podgorica
- 2021–2023: CSM București
National team
Years	Team	Apps	(Gls)
2014–	Montenegro	92	(102)
Medal record
European Championship
Bronze medal – third place	2022 Slovenia/North Macedonia/Montenegro

Ema Alivodić, née Ramusović (born 28 November 1995) is a Montenegrin handball player for CSM București and the Montenegrin national team.

She represented Montenegro at the 2014 European Women's Handball Championship in Hungary and Croatia where she scored 1 goal against Slovakia. Ema also scored 8 goals for Budućnost Podgorica in the 2014–15 EHF Women's Champions League.

== Achievements ==
- EHF Champions League:
  - Winner: 2015
- Romanian Cup:
  - Winner: 2022
- Romanian Supercup:
  - Finalist: 2021
- Montenegrin Championship:
  - Winner: 2015, 2016, 2017, 2018, 2019, 2021
- Montenegrin Cup:
  - Winner: 2015, 2016, 2017, 2018, 2019, 2020, 2021
- Women's Regional Handball League:
  - Winner: 2015, 2016, 2019

== Awards and recognition ==
- Handball-Planet.com World Young Female All-Star Team: 2015–16
