= Petra Kudláčková =

Czech handball player (born 1994)

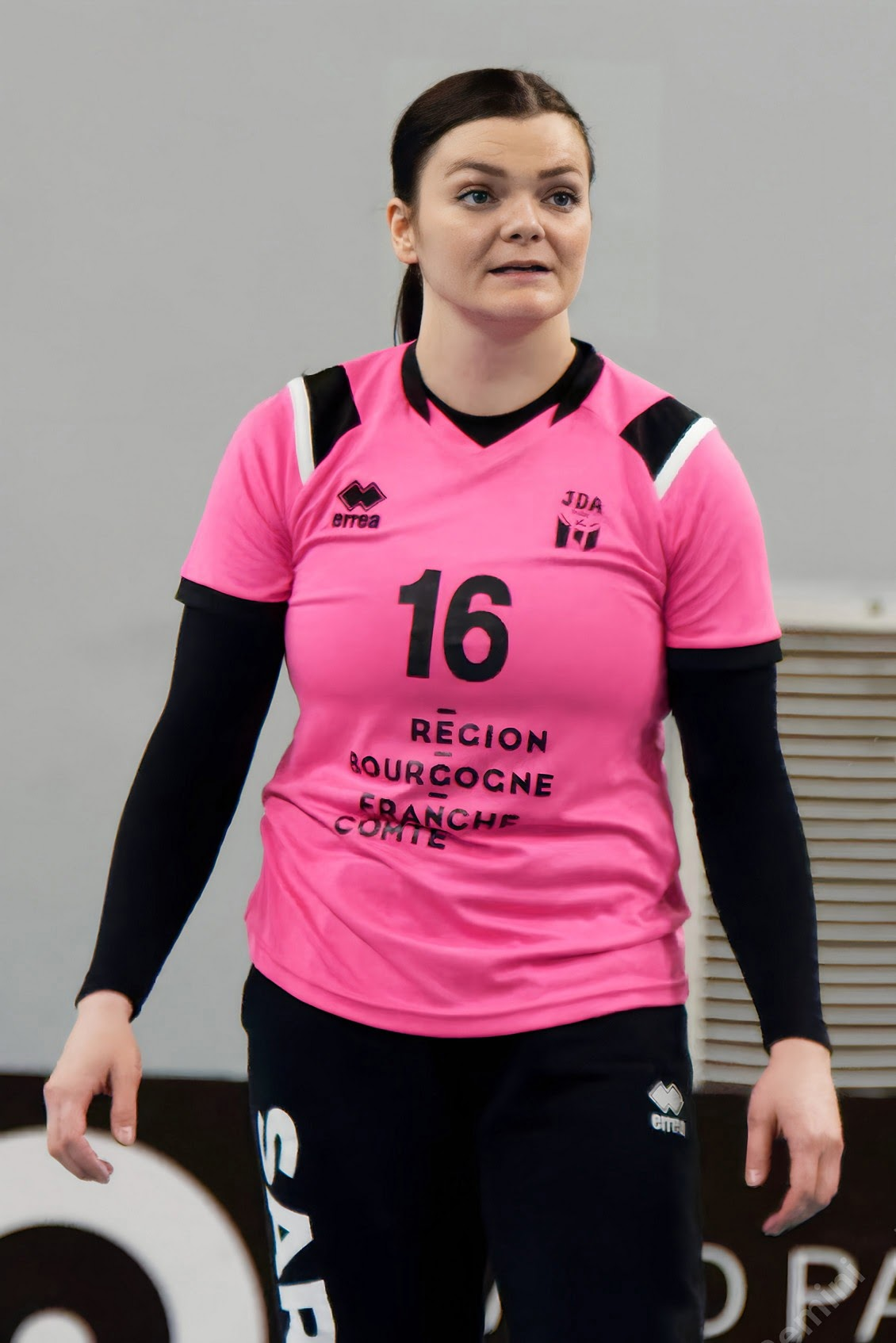
- Petra Kudláčková (2022)

Personal information
- Nationality: Czech
- Born: 17 October 1994 (age 32) Prague, Czech Republic
- Height: 1.73 m (5 ft 8 in)

Sport
- Sport: Handball
- Position: Goalkeeper
- Current club: HC Zlín
- Number: 16

Senior clubs
- Years: Team
- 2013–2018: DHC Slavia Prague
- 2018–2021: Kristianstad Handboll
- 2021–2022: Jeanne d'Arc Dijon Handball
- 2022–2024: DHC Slavia Prague
- 2024-: HC Zlín
National team
Years	Team	Apps	(Gls)
2016–	Czech Republic	89	(2)
- Updated on 31 October 2024

Petra Kudláčková (born 17 October 1994) is a Czech handballer for Czech team HC Zlín and the Czech national team.

She participated at the 2018 European Women's Handball Championship.
