= 2020 European Women's Handball Championship =

Season of the European Women's Handball Championship

2020 EHF European Women's Handball Championship

Tournament details
- Host country: Denmark
- Venues: 2 (in 2 host cities)
- Dates: 3–20 December
- Teams: 16 (from 1 confederation)

Final positions
- Champions: Norway (8th title)
- Runners-up: France
- Third place: Croatia
- Fourth place: Denmark

Tournament statistics
- Matches played: 47
- Goals scored: 2,410 (51.28 per match)
- Attendance: 0 (0 per match)
- Top scorer(s): (Norway) Nora Mørk (52 goals)

Awards
- Best player: (France) Estelle Nze Minko

The 2020 European Women's Handball Championship was held from 3 to 20 December 2020. The games were played in Herning and Kolding, Denmark.

Originally, this tournament would be held with 2 host countries: Norway and Denmark. However, lacking some time for the beginning, Norway renounced the right to seat, respecting the local legislation about the COVID-19 pandemic.

The tournament was also one of the qualification events for the 2021 World Women's Handball Championship. It was also played behind closed doors due to the pandemic.

Norway won the tournament for the eighth time after defeating France in the final. Croatia won the third place game to capture their first ever medal.

== Bidding process ==
The bids were as follows:

- Denmark
- Norway

In December 2013, these were announced as the bids:

- Denmark and Norway
- Norway

The joint bid of Denmark and Norway was recommended as the preferred bid. Shortly after, Denmark and Norway decided to merge their bids. They were announced as the hosts in Dublin on 20 September 2014.

== Venues ==
On 9 September 2020, the Norwegian Handball Federation announced, that all games scheduled to take place in Norway, would be played in Trondheim, while on 6 November, the Danish Handball Federation announced, that all games scheduled to take place in Denmark, would be played in Jyske Bank Boxen, Herning. On 16 November, Norway withdrew altogether for health reasons. Danish Sydbank Arena then announced a wish to co-host the tournament together with Herning and this was approved of by the Danish government on 23 November 2020.

(Denmark) Herning	(Denmark) ~~Frederikshavn~~	(Norway) ~~Stavanger~~
Jyske Bank Boxen	~~Arena Nord~~	~~Stavanger Idrettshall~~
Capacity: 15,000	Capacity: 2,800	Capacity: 7,000
2020 European Women's Handball Championship is located in Scandinavia
(Norway) ~~Bærum~~	(Norway) ~~Trondheim~~	(Denmark) Kolding
~~Telenor Arena~~	~~Trondheim Spektrum~~	Sydbank Arena
Capacity: 15,000	Capacity: 8,000	Capacity: 5,100

== Qualification ==
Due to the COVID-19 pandemic, the qualification was cancelled and the 2018 final ranking decided the participants.

=== Qualified teams ===
Country	Qualified as	Date of qualification	Previous appearances in tournament
Denmark	Host	20 September 2014	13 (1994, 1996, 1998, 2000, 2002, 2004, 2006, 2008, 2010, 2012, 2014, 2016, 2018)
Norway	Originally co-host	20 September 2014	13 (1994, 1996, 1998, 2000, 2002, 2004, 2006, 2008, 2010, 2012, 2014, 2016, 2018)
France	2018 final ranking	24 April 2020	10 (2000, 2002, 2004, 2006, 2008, 2010, 2012, 2014, 2016, 2018)
Russia	2018 final ranking	24 April 2020	13 (1994, 1996, 1998, 2000, 2002, 2004, 2006, 2008, 2010, 2012, 2014, 2016, 2018)
Netherlands	2018 final ranking	24 April 2020	7 (1998, 2002, 2006, 2010, 2014, 2016, 2018)
Romania	2018 final ranking	24 April 2020	12 (1994, 1996, 1998, 2000, 2002, 2004, 2008, 2010, 2012, 2014, 2016, 2018)
Sweden	2018 final ranking	24 April 2020	11 (1994, 1996, 2002, 2004, 2006, 2008, 2010, 2012, 2014, 2016, 2018)
Hungary	2018 final ranking	24 April 2020	13 (1994, 1996, 1998, 2000, 2002, 2004, 2006, 2008, 2010, 2012, 2014, 2016, 2018)
Montenegro	2018 final ranking	24 April 2020	5 (2010, 2012, 2014, 2016, 2018)
Germany	2018 final ranking	24 April 2020	13 (1994, 1996, 1998, 2000, 2002, 2004, 2006, 2008, 2010, 2012, 2014, 2016, 2018)
Serbia	2018 final ranking	24 April 2020	7 (2006, 2008, 2010, 2012, 2014, 2016, 2018)
Spain	2018 final ranking	24 April 2020	10 (1998, 2002, 2004, 2006, 2008, 2010, 2012, 2014, 2016, 2018)
Slovenia	2018 final ranking	24 April 2020	6 (2002, 2004, 2006, 2010, 2016, 2018)
Poland	2018 final ranking	24 April 2020	6 (1996, 1998, 2006, 2014, 2016, 2018)
Czech Republic	2018 final ranking	24 April 2020	6 (1994, 2002, 2004, 2012, 2016, 2018)
Croatia	2018 final ranking	24 April 2020	10 (1994, 1996, 2004, 2006, 2008, 2010, 2012, 2014, 2016, 2018)

== Draw ==
The draw was held on 18 June 2020 in Vienna, Austria.

=== Seedings ===
The pots were announced on 7 May 2020.

Pot 1	Pot 2	Pot 3	Pot 4
France; Russia; Netherlands; Romania	Norway; Sweden; Hungary; Denmark	Montenegro; Germany; Serbia; Spain	Slovenia; Poland; Czech Republic; Croatia

== Squads ==
Each squad consisted of 16 players, with a maximum of six players who could be replaced during the tournament. However, in regard to the COVID-19 pandemic and the potential risk of several players from the same team testing positive, there was no limit to the number of replacements for players testing positive.

== Referees ==
10 referee pairs were selected on 9 October 2020. Two new pairs were added ahead of the main round.

Referees
Austria	Ana Vranes; Marlis Wenninger
Bosnia and Herzegovina	Vesna Balvan; Tatjana Praštalo
Denmark	Karina Christiansen; Line Hansen
France	Charlotte Bonaventura; Julie Bonaventura
Greece	Ioanna Christidi; Ioanna Papamattheou
Lithuania	Viktorija Kijauskaitė; Aušra Žalienė

Referees
Montenegro	Jelena Mitrović; Anđelina Kažanegra
Poland	Małgorzata Lidacka; Urszula Lesiak
Portugal	Vânia Sá; Marta Sá
Romania	Cristina Năstase; Simona Stancu
Russia	Viktoria Alpaidze; Tatyana Berezkina
Serbia	Vanja Antić; Jelena Jakovljević

== Preliminary round ==
All times are local (UTC+1).

=== Group A ===
Pos	Team	Pld	W	D	L	GF	GA	GD	Pts	Qualification
1	France	3	3	0	0	74	60	+14	6	Main round
2	Denmark (H)	3	2	0	1	78	65	+13	4	Main round
3	Montenegro	3	1	0	2	68	77	−9	2	Main round
4	Slovenia	3	0	0	3	65	83	−18	0	

Source: EHF
Rules for classification: 1) points; 2) head-to-head points; 3) head-to-head goal difference; 4) head-to-head number of goals scored; 5) goal difference.
(H) Hosts

4 December 2020; 18:15	France	24–23	Montenegro	Jyske Bank Boxen, Herning; Referees: V. Sá, M. Sá (POR)
4 December 2020; 18:15	four players 3	(11–12)	Mehmedović, Radičević 5	Jyske Bank Boxen, Herning; Referees: V. Sá, M. Sá (POR)
4 December 2020; 18:15	1× (yellow card) 1× (suspension)	Report	6× (suspension)	Jyske Bank Boxen, Herning; Referees: V. Sá, M. Sá (POR)

4 December 2020; 20:30	Denmark	30–23	Slovenia	Jyske Bank Boxen, Herning; Referees: Antić, Jakovljević (SRB)
4 December 2020; 20:30	Nolsøe 6	(14–12)	Lazović, Ljepoja 5	Jyske Bank Boxen, Herning; Referees: Antić, Jakovljević (SRB)
4 December 2020; 20:30	1× (yellow card) 5× (suspension)	Report	2× (yellow card) 5× (suspension)	Jyske Bank Boxen, Herning; Referees: Antić, Jakovljević (SRB)

6 December 2020; 18:15	Slovenia	17–27	France	Jyske Bank Boxen, Herning; Referees: Christidi, Papamattheou (GRE)
6 December 2020; 18:15	Gros, Lazović 4	(6–12)	Lacrabère, Nze Minko 7	Jyske Bank Boxen, Herning; Referees: Christidi, Papamattheou (GRE)
6 December 2020; 18:15	5× (suspension)	Report	1× (yellow card) 8× (suspension)	Jyske Bank Boxen, Herning; Referees: Christidi, Papamattheou (GRE)

6 December 2020; 20:30	Montenegro	19–28	Denmark	Jyske Bank Boxen, Herning; Referees: Năstase, Stancu (ROU)
6 December 2020; 20:30	Radičević, Ramusović 4	(11–13)	three players 4	Jyske Bank Boxen, Herning; Referees: Năstase, Stancu (ROU)
6 December 2020; 20:30	1× (yellow card) 1× (suspension)	Report	2× (suspension)	Jyske Bank Boxen, Herning; Referees: Năstase, Stancu (ROU)

8 December 2020; 18:15	Montenegro	26–25	Slovenia	Jyske Bank Boxen, Herning; Referees: M. Sá, V. Sá (POR)
8 December 2020; 18:15	Radičević 9	(15–9)	Gros 7	Jyske Bank Boxen, Herning; Referees: M. Sá, V. Sá (POR)
8 December 2020; 18:15	2× (yellow card) 2× (suspension)	Report	2× (suspension)	Jyske Bank Boxen, Herning; Referees: M. Sá, V. Sá (POR)

8 December 2020; 20:30	France	23–20	Denmark	Jyske Bank Boxen, Herning; Referees: Năstase, Stancu (ROU)
8 December 2020; 20:30	Kanor, Zaadi 5	(12–11)	three players 4	Jyske Bank Boxen, Herning; Referees: Năstase, Stancu (ROU)
8 December 2020; 20:30	1× (yellow card) 4× (suspension)	Report	1× (yellow card) 2× (suspension)	Jyske Bank Boxen, Herning; Referees: Năstase, Stancu (ROU)

=== Group B ===
Pos	Team	Pld	W	D	L	GF	GA	GD	Pts	Qualification
1	Russia	3	3	0	0	85	70	+15	6	Main round
2	Sweden	3	1	1	1	76	76	0	3 (Note: Spain 23–23 Sweden; goal difference, Sweden 0 and Spain −6)	Main round
3	Spain	3	1	1	1	72	78	−6	3	Main round
4	Czech Republic	3	0	0	3	69	78	−9	0	

Source: EHF
Rules for classification: 1) points; 2) head-to-head points; 3) head-to-head goal difference; 4) head-to-head number of goals scored; 5) goal difference.
Notes:

3 December 2020; 18:15	Russia	31–22	Spain	Jyske Bank Boxen, Herning; Referees: Năstase, Stancu (ROU)
3 December 2020; 18:15	four players 4	(13–11)	three players 4	Jyske Bank Boxen, Herning; Referees: Năstase, Stancu (ROU)
3 December 2020; 18:15	2× (yellow card) 3× (suspension)	Report	1× (yellow card) 6× (suspension)	Jyske Bank Boxen, Herning; Referees: Năstase, Stancu (ROU)

3 December 2020; 20:30	Sweden	27–23	Czech Republic	Jyske Bank Boxen, Herning; Referees: Antić, Jakovljević (SRB)
3 December 2020; 20:30	Blohm 5	(13–13)	Jeřábková 8	Jyske Bank Boxen, Herning; Referees: Antić, Jakovljević (SRB)
3 December 2020; 20:30	1× (yellow card) 7× (suspension)	Report	4× (suspension)	Jyske Bank Boxen, Herning; Referees: Antić, Jakovljević (SRB)

5 December 2020; 18:15	Czech Republic	22–24	Russia	Jyske Bank Boxen, Herning; Referees: M. Sá, V. Sá (POR)
5 December 2020; 18:15	Jeřábková 6	(13–15)	four players 3	Jyske Bank Boxen, Herning; Referees: M. Sá, V. Sá (POR)
5 December 2020; 18:15	2× (yellow card) 3× (suspension)	Report	1× (yellow card) 3× (suspension)	Jyske Bank Boxen, Herning; Referees: M. Sá, V. Sá (POR)

5 December 2020; 20:30	Spain	23–23	Sweden	Jyske Bank Boxen, Herning; Referees: Năstase, Stancu (ROU)
5 December 2020; 20:30	Pena 6	(13–10)	Petrén 8	Jyske Bank Boxen, Herning; Referees: Năstase, Stancu (ROU)
5 December 2020; 20:30	2× (yellow card) 4× (suspension) 1× (red card)	Report	1× (yellow card) 5× (suspension)	Jyske Bank Boxen, Herning; Referees: Năstase, Stancu (ROU)

7 December 2020; 18:15	Spain	27–24	Czech Republic	Jyske Bank Boxen, Herning; Referees: Antić, Jakovljević (SRB)
7 December 2020; 18:15	Martín 12	(11–16)	Jeřábková 8	Jyske Bank Boxen, Herning; Referees: Antić, Jakovljević (SRB)
7 December 2020; 18:15	1× (yellow card) 4× (suspension)	Report	2× (yellow card) 3× (suspension)	Jyske Bank Boxen, Herning; Referees: Antić, Jakovljević (SRB)

7 December 2020; 20:30	Russia	30–26	Sweden	Jyske Bank Boxen, Herning; Referees: Christidi, Papamattheou (GRE)
7 December 2020; 20:30	Dmitrieva 6	(15–13)	Thorleifsdóttir 6	Jyske Bank Boxen, Herning; Referees: Christidi, Papamattheou (GRE)
7 December 2020; 20:30	4× (suspension)	Report	4× (yellow card) 1× (suspension)	Jyske Bank Boxen, Herning; Referees: Christidi, Papamattheou (GRE)

=== Group C ===
Pos	Team	Pld	W	D	L	GF	GA	GD	Pts	Qualification
1	Croatia	3	3	0	0	76	71	+5	6	Main round
2	Hungary	3	1	0	2	84	78	+6	2 (Note: Hungary 2 Pts, +8 GD; Netherlands 2 Pts, 0 GD; Serbia 2 Pts, −8 GD)	Main round
3	Netherlands	3	1	0	2	78	80	−2	2	Main round
4	Serbia	3	1	0	2	79	88	−9	2	

Source: EHF
Rules for classification: 1) points; 2) head-to-head points; 3) head-to-head goal difference; 4) head-to-head number of goals scored; 5) goal difference.
Notes:

4 December 2020; 18:15	Hungary	22–24	Croatia	Sydbank Arena, Kolding; Referees: Mitrović, Kažanegra (MNE)
4 December 2020; 18:15	Klujber 9	(12–12)	Mičijević 4	Sydbank Arena, Kolding; Referees: Mitrović, Kažanegra (MNE)
4 December 2020; 18:15	1× (yellow card) 6× (suspension)	Report	3× (suspension)	Sydbank Arena, Kolding; Referees: Mitrović, Kažanegra (MNE)

5 December 2020 (Note: The match, originally scheduled for 4 December 2020, was postponed after a positive COVID-19 test by a Serbian player.); 20:30	Netherlands	25–29	Serbia	Sydbank Arena, Kolding; Referees: Alpaidze, Berezkina (RUS)
5 December 2020; 20:30	Snelder 5	(15–9)	Krpež Šlezak 10	Sydbank Arena, Kolding; Referees: Alpaidze, Berezkina (RUS)
5 December 2020; 20:30	1× (yellow card) 4× (suspension)	Report	1× (yellow card) 1× (suspension)	Sydbank Arena, Kolding; Referees: Alpaidze, Berezkina (RUS)

6 December 2020; 16:00	Serbia	26–38	Hungary	Sydbank Arena, Kolding; Referees: C. Bonaventura, J. Bonaventura (FRA)
6 December 2020; 16:00	Radosavljević 5	(11–20)	Szöllősi-Zácsik 10	Sydbank Arena, Kolding; Referees: C. Bonaventura, J. Bonaventura (FRA)
6 December 2020; 16:00	3× (suspension)	Report	1× (yellow card)	Sydbank Arena, Kolding; Referees: C. Bonaventura, J. Bonaventura (FRA)

6 December 2020; 18:15	Croatia	27–25	Netherlands	Sydbank Arena, Kolding; Referees: Christiansen, Hansen (DEN)
6 December 2020; 18:15	L. Kalaus 9	(13–14)	Abbingh, Dulfer 5	Sydbank Arena, Kolding; Referees: Christiansen, Hansen (DEN)
6 December 2020; 18:15	1× (yellow card) 4× (suspension)	Report	3× (yellow card) 4× (suspension)	Sydbank Arena, Kolding; Referees: Christiansen, Hansen (DEN)

8 December 2020; 18:15	Serbia	24–25	Croatia	Sydbank Arena, Kolding; Referees: Christiansen, Hansen (DEN)
8 December 2020; 18:15	Krpež Šlezak 5	(14–14)	Krsnik 6	Sydbank Arena, Kolding; Referees: Christiansen, Hansen (DEN)
8 December 2020; 18:15	1× (yellow card) 3× (suspension)	Report	2× (yellow card) 4× (suspension) 2× (red card) 1×	Sydbank Arena, Kolding; Referees: Christiansen, Hansen (DEN)

8 December 2020; 20:30	Netherlands	28–24	Hungary	Sydbank Arena, Kolding; Referees: C. Bonaventura, J. Bonaventura (FRA)
8 December 2020; 20:30	Dulfer 8	(13–15)	three players 4	Sydbank Arena, Kolding; Referees: C. Bonaventura, J. Bonaventura (FRA)
8 December 2020; 20:30	1× (yellow card) 2× (suspension)	Report	1× (yellow card) 1× (suspension)	Sydbank Arena, Kolding; Referees: C. Bonaventura, J. Bonaventura (FRA)

=== Group D ===
Pos	Team	Pld	W	D	L	GF	GA	GD	Pts	Qualification
1	Norway	3	3	0	0	105	65	+40	6	Main round
2	Germany	3	1	1	1	66	82	−16	3	Main round
3	Romania	3	1	0	2	67	74	−7	2	Main round
4	Poland	3	0	1	2	67	84	−17	1	

Source: EHF
Rules for classification: 1) points; 2) head-to-head points; 3) head-to-head goal difference; 4) head-to-head number of goals scored; 5) goal difference.

3 December 2020; 18:00	Romania	19–22	Germany	Sydbank Arena, Kolding; Referees: J. Bonaventura, C. Bonaventura (FRA)
3 December 2020; 18:00	Neagu 4	(10–13)	three players 4	Sydbank Arena, Kolding; Referees: J. Bonaventura, C. Bonaventura (FRA)
3 December 2020; 18:00	1× (yellow card) 6× (suspension)	Report	1× (yellow card) 2× (suspension)	Sydbank Arena, Kolding; Referees: J. Bonaventura, C. Bonaventura (FRA)

3 December 2020; 20:30	Norway	35–22	Poland	Sydbank Arena, Kolding; Referees: Christidi, Papamattheou (GRE)
3 December 2020; 20:30	Mørk, Reistad 6	(17–13)	Gęga 6	Sydbank Arena, Kolding; Referees: Christidi, Papamattheou (GRE)
3 December 2020; 20:30	6× (suspension)	Report	3× (yellow card) 6× (suspension)	Sydbank Arena, Kolding; Referees: Christidi, Papamattheou (GRE)

5 December 2020; 16:00	Poland	24–28	Romania	Sydbank Arena, Kolding; Referees: Christiansen, Hansen (DEN)
5 December 2020; 16:00	Rosiak 7	(15–11)	Neagu 8	Sydbank Arena, Kolding; Referees: Christiansen, Hansen (DEN)
5 December 2020; 16:00	1× (yellow card) 3× (suspension)	Report	2× (suspension)	Sydbank Arena, Kolding; Referees: Christiansen, Hansen (DEN)

5 December 2020; 18:15	Germany	23–42	Norway	Sydbank Arena, Kolding; Referees: Mitrović, Kažanegra (MNE)
5 December 2020; 18:15	Bölk, Smits 4	(14–22)	Mørk 12	Sydbank Arena, Kolding; Referees: Mitrović, Kažanegra (MNE)
5 December 2020; 18:15	5× (suspension)	Report	1× (yellow card) 3× (suspension)	Sydbank Arena, Kolding; Referees: Mitrović, Kažanegra (MNE)

7 December 2020; 18:15	Germany	21–21	Poland	Sydbank Arena, Kolding; Referees: Alpaidze, Berezkina (RUS)
7 December 2020; 18:15	Zapf 4	(9–8)	Rosiak 4	Sydbank Arena, Kolding; Referees: Alpaidze, Berezkina (RUS)
7 December 2020; 18:15	1× (yellow card) 6× (suspension)	Report	1× (yellow card) 3× (suspension)	Sydbank Arena, Kolding; Referees: Alpaidze, Berezkina (RUS)

7 December 2020; 20:30	Romania	20–28	Norway	Sydbank Arena, Kolding; Referees: Mitrović, Kažanegra (MNE)
7 December 2020; 20:30	Ostase 6	(13–13)	Herrem 6	Sydbank Arena, Kolding; Referees: Mitrović, Kažanegra (MNE)
7 December 2020; 20:30	3× (suspension)	Report	2× (suspension)	Sydbank Arena, Kolding; Referees: Mitrović, Kažanegra (MNE)

== Main round ==
Points gained in the preliminary round against team that also advanced, were carried over.

=== Group I ===
Pos	Team	Pld	W	D	L	GF	GA	GD	Pts	Qualification
1	France	5	4	1	0	132	121	+11	9	Semifinals
2	Denmark (H)	5	4	0	1	136	111	+25	8	Semifinals
3	Russia	5	3	1	1	136	129	+7	7	Fifth place game
4	Montenegro	5	1	1	3	122	127	−5	3	
5	Spain	5	0	2	3	120	140	−20	2	
6	Sweden	5	0	1	4	121	139	−18	1	

Source: EHF
Rules for classification: 1) points; 2) head-to-head points; 3) head-to-head goal difference; 4) head-to-head number of goals scored; 5) goal difference.
(H) Hosts

10 December 2020; 18:15	Montenegro	23–24	Russia	Jyske Bank Boxen, Herning; Referees: Antić, Jakovljević (SRB)
10 December 2020; 18:15	Despotović 7	(13–13)	three players 4	Jyske Bank Boxen, Herning; Referees: Antić, Jakovljević (SRB)
10 December 2020; 18:15	1× (yellow card) 3× (suspension)	Report	1× (yellow card) 3× (suspension)	Jyske Bank Boxen, Herning; Referees: Antić, Jakovljević (SRB)

10 December 2020; 20:30	France	26–25	Spain	Jyske Bank Boxen, Herning; Referees: Lidacka, Lesiak (POL)
10 December 2020; 20:30	Lacrabère 5	(16–10)	Martín 9	Jyske Bank Boxen, Herning; Referees: Lidacka, Lesiak (POL)
10 December 2020; 20:30	1× (yellow card) 3× (suspension)	Report	1× (yellow card) 3× (suspension)	Jyske Bank Boxen, Herning; Referees: Lidacka, Lesiak (POL)

11 December 2020; 18:15	France	28–28	Russia	Jyske Bank Boxen, Herning; Referees: M. Sá, V. Sá (POR)
11 December 2020; 18:15	Nze Minko, Sercien-Ugolin 5	(16–19)	three players 5	Jyske Bank Boxen, Herning; Referees: M. Sá, V. Sá (POR)
11 December 2020; 18:15	2× (yellow card) 5× (suspension)	Report	3× (yellow card) 4× (suspension)	Jyske Bank Boxen, Herning; Referees: M. Sá, V. Sá (POR)

11 December 2020; 20:30	Denmark	24–22	Sweden	Jyske Bank Boxen, Herning; Referees: Kijauskaitė, Žalienė (LTU)
11 December 2020; 20:30	Tranborg 6	(13–12)	Thorleifsdóttir 4	Jyske Bank Boxen, Herning; Referees: Kijauskaitė, Žalienė (LTU)
11 December 2020; 20:30	1× (yellow card) 5× (suspension)	Report	1× (yellow card) 5× (suspension)	Jyske Bank Boxen, Herning; Referees: Kijauskaitė, Žalienė (LTU)

13 December 2020; 18:15	Montenegro	31–25	Sweden	Jyske Bank Boxen, Herning; Referees: Lidacka, Lesiak (POL)
13 December 2020; 18:15	Radičević 11	(16–10)	Blohm 8	Jyske Bank Boxen, Herning; Referees: Lidacka, Lesiak (POL)
13 December 2020; 18:15	2× (yellow card) 3× (suspension)	Report	3× (suspension)	Jyske Bank Boxen, Herning; Referees: Lidacka, Lesiak (POL)

13 December 2020; 20:30	Denmark	34–24	Spain	Jyske Bank Boxen, Herning; Referees: Năstase, Stancu (ROU)
13 December 2020; 20:30	Rej 6	(17–10)	Fernández 4	Jyske Bank Boxen, Herning; Referees: Năstase, Stancu (ROU)
13 December 2020; 20:30	4× (suspension)	Report	4× (suspension)	Jyske Bank Boxen, Herning; Referees: Năstase, Stancu (ROU)

15 December 2020; 16:00	Montenegro	26–26	Spain	Jyske Bank Boxen, Herning; Referees: Kijauskaitė, Žalienė (LTU)
15 December 2020; 16:00	Radičević 7	(11–17)	Pena 6	Jyske Bank Boxen, Herning; Referees: Kijauskaitė, Žalienė (LTU)
15 December 2020; 16:00	1× (yellow card) 2× (suspension)	Report	1× (yellow card) 3× (suspension)	Jyske Bank Boxen, Herning; Referees: Kijauskaitė, Žalienė (LTU)

15 December 2020; 18:15	France	31–25	Sweden	Jyske Bank Boxen, Herning; Referees: Antić, Jakovljević (SRB)
15 December 2020; 18:15	Nze Minko 6	(14–14)	Gulldén 5	Jyske Bank Boxen, Herning; Referees: Antić, Jakovljević (SRB)
15 December 2020; 18:15	1× (yellow card) 1× (suspension)	Report	2× (yellow card) 1× (suspension)	Jyske Bank Boxen, Herning; Referees: Antić, Jakovljević (SRB)

15 December 2020; 20:30	Denmark	30–23	Russia	Jyske Bank Boxen, Herning; Referees: Mitrović, Kažanegra (MNE)
15 December 2020; 20:30	Højlund 7	(13–9)	Dmitrieva 9	Jyske Bank Boxen, Herning; Referees: Mitrović, Kažanegra (MNE)
15 December 2020; 20:30	2× (suspension)	Report	4× (suspension)	Jyske Bank Boxen, Herning; Referees: Mitrović, Kažanegra (MNE)

=== Group II ===
Pos	Team	Pld	W	D	L	GF	GA	GD	Pts	Qualification
1	Norway	5	5	0	0	170	114	+56	10	Semifinals
2	Croatia	5	4	0	1	124	123	+1	8	Semifinals
3	Netherlands	5	3	0	2	141	134	+7	6	Fifth place game
4	Germany	5	2	0	3	124	137	−13	4	
5	Hungary	5	1	0	4	118	140	−22	2	
6	Romania	5	0	0	5	107	136	−29	0	

Source: EHF
Rules for classification: 1) points; 2) head-to-head points; 3) head-to-head goal difference; 4) head-to-head number of goals scored; 5) goal difference.

10 December 2020; 18:15	Croatia	25–20	Romania	Sydbank Arena, Kolding; Referees: Alpaidze, Berezkina (RUS)
10 December 2020; 18:15	Blažević 7	(14–10)	Neagu 6	Sydbank Arena, Kolding; Referees: Alpaidze, Berezkina (RUS)
10 December 2020; 18:15	1× (yellow card) 4× (suspension)	Report	1× (yellow card) 2× (suspension)	Sydbank Arena, Kolding; Referees: Alpaidze, Berezkina (RUS)

10 December 2020; 20:30	Netherlands	25–32	Norway	Sydbank Arena, Kolding; Referees: Christidi, Papamattheou (GRE)
10 December 2020; 20:30	Malestein 5	(10–16)	Mørk 8	Sydbank Arena, Kolding; Referees: Christidi, Papamattheou (GRE)
10 December 2020; 20:30	4× (yellow card) 5× (suspension)	Report	1× (yellow card) 2× (suspension)	Sydbank Arena, Kolding; Referees: Christidi, Papamattheou (GRE)

12 December 2020; 16:00	Hungary	25–32	Germany	Sydbank Arena, Kolding; Referees: Christiansen, Hansen (DEN)
12 December 2020; 16:00	Klujber 8	(11–13)	Bölk 5	Sydbank Arena, Kolding; Referees: Christiansen, Hansen (DEN)
12 December 2020; 16:00	1× (yellow card) 1× (suspension)	Report	3× (suspension)	Sydbank Arena, Kolding; Referees: Christiansen, Hansen (DEN)

12 December 2020; 18:15	Croatia	25–36	Norway	Sydbank Arena, Kolding; Referees: C. Bonaventura, J. Bonaventura (FRA)
12 December 2020; 18:15	Mičijević 7	(14–15)	Reistad 7	Sydbank Arena, Kolding; Referees: C. Bonaventura, J. Bonaventura (FRA)
12 December 2020; 18:15	1× (yellow card) 5× (suspension)	Report		Sydbank Arena, Kolding; Referees: C. Bonaventura, J. Bonaventura (FRA)

14 December 2020; 18:15	Netherlands	28–27	Germany	Sydbank Arena, Kolding; Referees: Alpaidze, Berezkina (RUS)
14 December 2020; 18:15	Abbingh 8	(14–15)	Behnke, Naidzinavicius 4	Sydbank Arena, Kolding; Referees: Alpaidze, Berezkina (RUS)
14 December 2020; 18:15	1× (suspension)	Report	1× (yellow card) 6× (suspension)	Sydbank Arena, Kolding; Referees: Alpaidze, Berezkina (RUS)

14 December 2020; 20:30	Hungary	26–24	Romania	Sydbank Arena, Kolding; Referees: Mitrović, Kažanegra (MNE)
14 December 2020; 20:30	Schatzl 7	(13–14)	Ostase 8	Sydbank Arena, Kolding; Referees: Mitrović, Kažanegra (MNE)
14 December 2020; 20:30	1× (yellow card) 2× (suspension)	Report	3× (suspension)	Sydbank Arena, Kolding; Referees: Mitrović, Kažanegra (MNE)

15 December 2020; 16:00	Netherlands	35–24	Romania	Sydbank Arena, Kolding; Referees: M. Sá, V. Sá (POR)
15 December 2020; 16:00	Van Wetering 8	(16–12)	Laslo 7	Sydbank Arena, Kolding; Referees: M. Sá, V. Sá (POR)
15 December 2020; 16:00	1× (yellow card) 3× (suspension)	Report	2× (yellow card) 1× (suspension)	Sydbank Arena, Kolding; Referees: M. Sá, V. Sá (POR)

15 December 2020; 18:15	Croatia	23–20	Germany	Sydbank Arena, Kolding; Referees: Christiansen, Hansen (DEN)
15 December 2020; 18:15	Debelić 6	(12–12)	Maidhof 9	Sydbank Arena, Kolding; Referees: Christiansen, Hansen (DEN)
15 December 2020; 18:15	1× (yellow card) 5× (suspension)	Report	1× (yellow card) 5× (suspension)	Sydbank Arena, Kolding; Referees: Christiansen, Hansen (DEN)

15 December 2020; 20:30	Hungary	21–32	Norway	Sydbank Arena, Kolding; Referees: Christidi, Papamattheou (GRE)
15 December 2020; 20:30	Kovacsics 7	(9–17)	Mørk 7	Sydbank Arena, Kolding; Referees: Christidi, Papamattheou (GRE)
15 December 2020; 20:30	3× (suspension)	Report	1× (suspension)	Sydbank Arena, Kolding; Referees: Christidi, Papamattheou (GRE)

== Knockout stage ==
=== Bracket ===
Semi-finals
18 December 2020
France	30
Croatia	19
18 December 2020
Norway	27
Denmark	24

Final
20 December 2020
France	20
Norway	22
Third place
20 December 2020
Croatia	25
Denmark	19

=== 5th place game ===
18 December 2020; 15:30	Russia	33–27	Netherlands	Jyske Bank Boxen, Herning; Referees: M. Sá, V. Sá (POR)
18 December 2020; 15:30	Vedekhina 6	(18–13)	Abbingh 10	Jyske Bank Boxen, Herning; Referees: M. Sá, V. Sá (POR)
18 December 2020; 15:30	2× (yellow card) 3× (suspension)	Report	2× (yellow card) 3× (suspension)	Jyske Bank Boxen, Herning; Referees: M. Sá, V. Sá (POR)

=== Semifinals ===
18 December 2020; 18:00	France	30–19	Croatia	Jyske Bank Boxen, Herning; Referees: Christiansen, Hansen (DEN)
18 December 2020; 18:00	four players 4	(15–5)	three players 3	Jyske Bank Boxen, Herning; Referees: Christiansen, Hansen (DEN)
18 December 2020; 18:00	1× (suspension)	Report	1× (yellow card) 2× (suspension)	Jyske Bank Boxen, Herning; Referees: Christiansen, Hansen (DEN)

18 December 2020; 20:30	Norway	27–24	Denmark	Jyske Bank Boxen, Herning; Referees: Năstase, Stancu (ROU)
18 December 2020; 20:30	Mørk 6	(10–13)	Rej 7	Jyske Bank Boxen, Herning; Referees: Năstase, Stancu (ROU)
18 December 2020; 20:30	1× (yellow card) 1× (suspension)	Report	2× (yellow card) 3× (suspension)	Jyske Bank Boxen, Herning; Referees: Năstase, Stancu (ROU)

=== Third place game ===
20 December 2020; 15:30	Croatia	25–19	Denmark	Jyske Bank Boxen, Herning; Referees: Mitrović, Kažanegra (MNE)
20 December 2020; 15:30	Ježić, Posavec 5	(11–11)	A. M. Hansen, Tranborg 4	Jyske Bank Boxen, Herning; Referees: Mitrović, Kažanegra (MNE)
20 December 2020; 15:30	1× (yellow card) 1× (suspension)	Report	1× (yellow card) 2× (suspension)	Jyske Bank Boxen, Herning; Referees: Mitrović, Kažanegra (MNE)

=== Final ===
20 December 2020; 18:00	France	20–22	Norway	Jyske Bank Boxen, Herning; Referees: Alpaidze, Berezkina (RUS)
20 December 2020; 18:00	Foppa 5	(10–14)	three players 4	Jyske Bank Boxen, Herning; Referees: Alpaidze, Berezkina (RUS)
20 December 2020; 18:00	3× (suspension) 1× (red card)	Report	3× (suspension)	Jyske Bank Boxen, Herning; Referees: Alpaidze, Berezkina (RUS)

== Final ranking and awards ==
=== Final ranking ===
Qualified for the 2021 World Championship.
Qualified for the 2021 World Championship as host.
Qualified for the 2021 World Championship as defending champion.

Rank	Team
1st place, gold medalist(s)	Norway
2nd place, silver medalist(s)	France
3rd place, bronze medalist(s)	Croatia
4	Denmark
5	Russia
6	Netherlands
7	Germany
8	Montenegro
9	Spain
10	Hungary
11	Sweden
12	Romania
13	Serbia
14	Poland
15	Czech Republic
16	Slovenia

2020 Women's European Champions

Norway
Eighth title

Team roster: Emily Stang Sando, Henny Reistad, Emilie Hegh Arntzen, Veronica Kristiansen, Marit Malm Frafjord, Heidi Løke, Stine Skogrand, Nora Mørk, Stine Bredal Oftedal, Malin Aune, Silje Solberg, Kari Brattset Dale, Katrine Lunde, Marit Røsberg Jacobsen, Camilla Herrem, Sanna Solberg-Isaksen, Kristine Breistøl, Marta Tomac, Rikke Granlund.
Head coach: Thorir Hergeirsson.

=== All Star Team ===
The All Star Team and awards were announced on 20 December 2020.

Position	Player
Goalkeeper	(Denmark) Sandra Toft
Left wing	(Norway) Camilla Herrem
Left back	(Russia) Vladlena Bobrovnikova
Centre back	(Norway) Stine Bredal Oftedal
Right back	(Norway) Nora Mørk
Right wing	(Montenegro) Jovanka Radičević
Pivot	(Croatia) Ana Debelić
Best defense player	(Denmark) Line Haugsted
Most valuable player	(France) Estelle Nze Minko

== Statistics ==
=== Top goalscorers ===
Rank	Name	Goals	Shots	%
1	(Norway) Nora Mørk	52	70	74
2	(Montenegro) Jovanka Radičević	39	58	67
3	(Netherlands) Lois Abbingh	35	67	52
3	(Croatia) Ćamila Mičijević	35	67	52
5	(Denmark) Mia Rej	33	49	67
5	(Norway) Camilla Herrem	33	47	70
7	(Spain) Carmen Martín	32	45	71
8	(France) Alexandra Lacrabère	31	45	69
8	(Norway) Stine Bredal Oftedal	31	59	53
10	(Hungary) Katrin Klujber	30	52	58

=== Top goalkeepers ===
Rank	Name	%	Saves	Shots
1	(Norway) Silje Solberg	41	36	88
2	(France) Cléopatre Darleux	38	41	107
2	(Slovenia) Branka Zec	38	13	34
2	(Norway) Katrine Lunde	38	45	119
5	(Czech Republic) Petra Kudláčková	36	42	116
5	(Croatia) Tea Pijević	36	79	221
7	(Denmark) Sandra Toft	35	75	214
7	(Denmark) Althea Reinhardt	35	24	69
9	(Romania) Denisa Dedu	34	30	87
10	(Romania) Iulia Dumanska	32	34	105
10	(France) Amandine Leynaud	32	50	157
