= 2021–22 Győri ETO KC season =

Győri Audi ETO KC
2021–22 season
- Chairman: Anita Görbicz
- Manager: Ambros Martín
- NB I: Champions
- Hungarian Cup: Runner-up
- EHF Champions League: Runner-up
- Top goalscorer: League: Linn Blohm (85 goals); All: Anne Mette Hansen (154 goals)
Home colours	Away colours

The 2021–22 season was Győri Audi ETO KC's 42nd competitive and consecutive season in the Nemzeti Bajnokság I and 74th year in existence as a handball club.

== Players ==
=== Squad information ===
Goalkeepers

- 1 (France) Laura Glauser
- 12 (France) Amandine Leynaud
- 16 (Norway) Silje Solberg

Left wingers

- 6 (Hungary) Nadine Schatzl
- 23 (Hungary) Csenge Fodor

Right wingers

- 22 (Hungary) Viktória Lukács
- 48 (Hungary) Dorottya Faluvégi

Pivots

- 5 (Sweden) Linn Blohm
- 7 (Norway) Kari Brattset Dale
- 77 (Romania) Crina Pintea

Left backs

- 4 (Hungary) Eszter Ogonovszky
- 8 (Denmark) Anne Mette Hansen (c)
- 21 (Norway) Veronica Kristiansen
- 45 (Hungary) Noémi Háfra
- 80 (Montenegro) Jelena Despotović

Centre backs

- 15 (Norway) Stine Bredal Oftedal
- 27 (France) Estelle Nze Minko
- 81 (Hungary) Júlia Farkas

Right backs

- 11 (South Korea) Ryu Eun-hee
- 55 (Hungary) Laura Kürthi

=== Transfers ===
IN

- (Spain) Ambros Martín (Head coach)
- (Hungary) Nadine Schatzl (LW) (from (Hungary) FTC-Rail Cargo Hungaria)
- (Hungary) Noémi Háfra (LB) (from (Hungary) FTC-Rail Cargo Hungaria)
- (Montenegro) Jelena Despotović (LB) (from (Hungary) Debreceni VSC Hungaria)
- (South Korea) Ryu Eun-hee (RB) (from (South Korea) Busan Bisco)
- (Sweden) Linn Blohm (P) (from (Romania) CS Minaur Baia Mare)
- (Romania) Crina Pintea (P) (from (Romania) CSM București)
- (Hungary) Júlia Farkas (CB) (from own rows)
- (Hungary) Laura Kürthi (RB) (back from loan from (Hungary) MTK Budapest) as of January 2022

OUT

- (Hungary) Gábor Danyi (Head coach) (to (Hungary) Siófok KC)
- (Hungary) Szidónia Puhalák (LW) (to (Hungary) Siófok KC)
- (Hungary) Brigitta Csekő (LW) (to (Hungary) Mosonmagyaróvári KC SE)
- (Norway) Amanda Kurtović (RB) (to (Romania) HC Dunărea Brăila)
- (Brazil) Eduarda Amorim Taleska (LB) (to (Russia) Rostov-Don)
- (France) Béatrice Edwige (P) (to (Russia) Rostov-Don)
- (Hungary) Laura Kürthi (RB) (on loan to (Hungary) MTK Budapest)
- (Hungary) Anita Görbicz (LW) (retires)

== Club ==
=== Technical Staff ===
Position	Staff member
President	(Hungary) Dr. Csaba Bartha (Until April 2022) (Hungary) Anita Görbicz
Technical manager	(Hungary) Péter Molnár
Head coach	(Spain) Ambros Martín
Assistant coach	(Hungary) Attila Kun
Team doctor	(Hungary) Dr. Péter Balogh
Team doctor	(Hungary) Dr. László Szálasy
Physiotherapist	(Hungary) Ádám Devecseri
Physiotherapist	(Hungary) Nikolett Budai
Physiotherapist	(Hungary) Edina Csernák
Fitness coach	(Hungary) Zoltán Holanek
Video Analytics	(Hungary) Attila Kun

Source: Coaches, Management

=== Uniform ===
- Supplier: (Germany) Adidas
- Main sponsor: Audi / tippmix / OTP Bank / City of Győr
- Back sponsor: PannErgy / Győrszol
- Shorts sponsor: OMV / Leier / OIL!

== Pre-season ==
=== Friendly matches ===
21 August 2021; 11:00	Győri Audi ETO KC	43–27	(Slovakia) HC DAC	Audi Aréna, Győr; Attendance: 1,200; Referees: Hajdú, Halász
21 August 2021; 11:00	Pintea 13	(21–15)		Audi Aréna, Győr; Attendance: 1,200; Referees: Hajdú, Halász
21 August 2021; 11:00		Report		Audi Aréna, Győr; Attendance: 1,200; Referees: Hajdú, Halász

28 August 2021; 17:00	Győri Audi ETO KC	30–23	(Hungary) Alba Fehérvár KC	NEKA Hall, Balatonboglár; Attendance: 0
28 August 2021; 17:00	Pintea 8	(14–11)	Smbatian 8	NEKA Hall, Balatonboglár; Attendance: 0
28 August 2021; 17:00		Report		NEKA Hall, Balatonboglár; Attendance: 0

2 September 2021; 16:00	Győri Audi ETO KC	32–27	(Slovenia) RK Krim	NEKA Hall, Balatonboglár; Attendance: 0
2 September 2021; 16:00	Hansen, Háfra, Schatzl 5	(18–16)		NEKA Hall, Balatonboglár; Attendance: 0
2 September 2021; 16:00		Report		NEKA Hall, Balatonboglár; Attendance: 0

== Competitions ==
=== Overview ===
Win Draw Loss

Competition	First match	Last match	Starting round	Record							
Competition	First match	Last match	Starting round	Pld	W	D	L	GF	GA	GD	Win %
Nemzeti Bajnokság I	8 September 2021	20 May 2022	Matchday 1	26	25	0	1	876	658	+218	96.15
Magyar Kupa	9 March 2022	29 May 2022	Fifth round	3	2	0	1	94	63	+31	66.67
EHF Champions League	11 September 2021	5 June 2022	Group stage	18	15	1	2	590	458	+132	83.33
Total				47	42	1	4	1,560	1,179	+381	89.36

Source: Competitions

=== Nemzeti Bajnokság I ===
==== League table ====
Pos	Team	Pld	W	D	L	GF	GA	GD	Pts	Qualification or relegation
1	Győri ETO KC (C)	26	25	0	1	876	568	+308	50 (Note: Győri Audi ETO KC 49–49 FTC-Rail Cargo Hungaria; Goal difference: Győri Audi ETO KC: +26)	Qualification to Champions League group phase
2	FTC-Rail Cargo Hungaria	26	25	0	1	849	574	+275	50	Qualification to Champions League group phase
3	DVSC SCHAEFFLER	26	21	0	5	758	636	+122	42	Qualification to European League group phase
4	Váci NKSE	26	17	0	9	799	758	+41	34	Qualification to European League third qualifying round
5	Motherson-Mosonmagyaróvári KC	26	14	2	10	812	756	+56	30 (Note: Motherson-Mosonmagyaróvár 74–57 Siófok KC)	Qualification to European League third qualifying round

Source: mksz.hu
Rules for classification: 1) Points; 2) Goal difference; 3) Head-to-head points; 4) Head-to-head goal difference; 5) Goals scored; 6) Matches won; 7) Draw (Note: Head-to-head record is used only after all the matches between the teams in question have been played)
(C) Champions

==== Results by round ====
Match	1	2	3	4	5	6	7	8	9	10	11	12	13	14	15	16	17	18	19	20	21	22	23	24	25	26
Ground	A	H	A	A	H	A	A	A	A	H	H	H	A	H	A	H	H	A	H	H	A	H	H	A	H	A
Result	W	W	W	W	W	W	W	W	W	W	W	W	W	W	W	W	W	W	W	W	W	W	W	L	W	W

Source: Matches
A = Away; H = Home; W = Win; D = Draw; L = Loss

==== Matches ====
Round 1; 8 September 2021; 18:00	Siófok KC	32–40	Győri Audi ETO KC	Kiss Szilárd Aréna, Siófok; Attendance: 900; Referees: Őri, Pozdena
Round 1; 8 September 2021; 18:00	Holta 8	(14–22)	Kristiansen 8	Kiss Szilárd Aréna, Siófok; Attendance: 900; Referees: Őri, Pozdena
Round 1; 8 September 2021; 18:00	1× (yellow card)	Report	2× (yellow card) 4× (suspension)	Kiss Szilárd Aréna, Siófok; Attendance: 900; Referees: Őri, Pozdena

Round 2; 14 September 2021; 18:00	Győri Audi ETO KC	41–21	Vasas SC	Audi Aréna, Győr; Attendance: 1,341; Referees: Kiu, Kiu
Round 2; 14 September 2021; 18:00	Fodor 8	(21–10)	Kajdon 7	Audi Aréna, Győr; Attendance: 1,341; Referees: Kiu, Kiu
Round 2; 14 September 2021; 18:00	1× (yellow card) 2× (suspension)	Report	2× (yellow card) 2× (suspension)	Audi Aréna, Győr; Attendance: 1,341; Referees: Kiu, Kiu

Round 3; 22 September 2021; 18:00	Alba Fehérvár KC	25–30	Győri Audi ETO KC	KÖFÉM Sports Hall, Székesfehérvár; Attendance: 700; Referees: Réti, Szedmák
Round 3; 22 September 2021; 18:00	Smbatian 5	(14–19)	Kristiansen 7	KÖFÉM Sports Hall, Székesfehérvár; Attendance: 700; Referees: Réti, Szedmák
Round 3; 22 September 2021; 18:00	2× (yellow card) 3× (suspension)	Report	2× (yellow card) 1× (suspension)	KÖFÉM Sports Hall, Székesfehérvár; Attendance: 700; Referees: Réti, Szedmák

Round 4; 1 October 2021; 18:00	Kisvárdai KC	25–31	Győri Audi ETO KC	Municipal Sports Hall, Kisvárda; Attendance: 600; Referees: Asztalos, Szalay
Round 4; 1 October 2021; 18:00	Habánková 6	(16–14)	Dale, Kristiansen 7	Municipal Sports Hall, Kisvárda; Attendance: 600; Referees: Asztalos, Szalay
Round 4; 1 October 2021; 18:00	1× (yellow card) 3× (suspension)	Report	1× (yellow card) 5× (suspension)	Municipal Sports Hall, Kisvárda; Attendance: 600; Referees: Asztalos, Szalay

Round 5; 20 October 2021; 18:00	Győri Audi ETO KC	44–25	Szombathelyi KKA	Audi Aréna, Győr; Attendance: 1,655; Referees: Rontó, Szanyi
Round 5; 20 October 2021; 18:00	three players 6	(26–13)	Gorilska 7	Audi Aréna, Győr; Attendance: 1,655; Referees: Rontó, Szanyi
Round 5; 20 October 2021; 18:00	1× (yellow card) 1× (suspension)	Report	1× (yellow card) 2× (suspension)	Audi Aréna, Győr; Attendance: 1,655; Referees: Rontó, Szanyi

Round 6; 27 October 2021; 18:00	Moyra-Budaörs Handball	15–36	Győri Audi ETO KC	Municipal Sports Hall, Budaörs; Attendance: 1,092; Referees: Budjosó, Horváth
Round 6; 27 October 2021; 18:00	Jovović 3	(9–12)	Brattset Dale 8	Municipal Sports Hall, Budaörs; Attendance: 1,092; Referees: Budjosó, Horváth
Round 6; 27 October 2021; 18:00	1× (yellow card) 3× (suspension)	Report	2× (yellow card)	Municipal Sports Hall, Budaörs; Attendance: 1,092; Referees: Budjosó, Horváth

Round 10; 2 November 2021; 18:00	Érd HC	0–10	Győri Audi ETO KC	Érd Aréna, Érd; Referees: Dáné, Marton
Round 10; 2 November 2021; 18:00		Report		Érd Aréna, Érd; Referees: Dáné, Marton

Round 7; 4 November 2021; 18:00	Váci NKSE	31–37	Győri Audi ETO KC	Municipal Sports Hall, Vác; Attendance: 660; Referees: Fekete, Tóth
Round 7; 4 November 2021; 18:00	Ballai 5	(19–17)	Brattset Dale 7	Municipal Sports Hall, Vác; Attendance: 660; Referees: Fekete, Tóth
Round 7; 4 November 2021; 18:00	2× (suspension)	Report	1× (yellow card) 2× (suspension)	Municipal Sports Hall, Vác; Attendance: 660; Referees: Fekete, Tóth

Round 8; 10 November 2021; 18:00	Mosonmagyaróvári KC SE	22–29	Győri Audi ETO KC	UFM Aréna, Mosonmagyaróvár; Attendance: 1,000; Referees: Sándor, Szikszay
Round 8; 10 November 2021; 18:00	G. Tóth 7	(13–15)	Hansen 8	UFM Aréna, Mosonmagyaróvár; Attendance: 1,000; Referees: Sándor, Szikszay
Round 8; 10 November 2021; 18:00	3× (yellow card) 2× (suspension)	Report	2× (yellow card) 5× (suspension)	UFM Aréna, Mosonmagyaróvár; Attendance: 1,000; Referees: Sándor, Szikszay

Round 9; 17 November 2021; 18:30	Győri Audi ETO KC	25–20	Ferencvárosi TC	Audi Aréna, Győr; Attendance: 5,030; Referees: Andorka, Hucker
Round 9; 17 November 2021; 18:30	Kristiansen 6	(13–12)	Szöllősi-Zácsik 4	Audi Aréna, Győr; Attendance: 5,030; Referees: Andorka, Hucker
Round 9; 17 November 2021; 18:30	1× (yellow card)	Report	1× (yellow card) 2× (suspension)	Audi Aréna, Győr; Attendance: 5,030; Referees: Andorka, Hucker

Round 11; 12 January 2022; 18:00	Győri Audi ETO KC	10–0	MTK Budapest	Audi Aréna, Győr
Round 11; 12 January 2022; 18:00		Report		Audi Aréna, Győr

Round 13; 28 January 2022; 16:00	Győri Audi ETO KC	31–23	DVSC Schaeffler	Audi Aréna, Győr; Attendance: 1,785; Referees: Hargitai, Markó
Round 13; 28 January 2022; 16:00	Pintea 10	(17–9)	Planéta 6	Audi Aréna, Győr; Attendance: 1,785; Referees: Hargitai, Markó
Round 13; 28 January 2022; 16:00	1× (yellow card)	Report	2× (yellow card)	Audi Aréna, Győr; Attendance: 1,785; Referees: Hargitai, Markó

Round 12; 2 February 2022; 18:00	Dunaújvárosi Kohász KA	26–36	Győri Audi ETO KC	Municipal Sports Hall, Dunaújváros; Attendance: 500; Referees: Dáné, Marton
Round 12; 2 February 2022; 18:00	Farkas, Szalai 5	(12–17)	Nze Minko 7	Municipal Sports Hall, Dunaújváros; Attendance: 500; Referees: Dáné, Marton
Round 12; 2 February 2022; 18:00	1× (suspension)	Report	1× (yellow card) 3× (suspension)	Municipal Sports Hall, Dunaújváros; Attendance: 500; Referees: Dáné, Marton

Round 14; 9 February 2022; 18:00	Győri Audi ETO KC	40–26	Siófok KC	Audi Aréna, Győr; Attendance: 2,279; Referees: Nagy, Túróczy
Round 14; 9 February 2022; 18:00	Hansen 7	(23–11)	Janjušević 5	Audi Aréna, Győr; Attendance: 2,279; Referees: Nagy, Túróczy
Round 14; 9 February 2022; 18:00	2× (yellow card) 2× (suspension)	Report	1× (yellow card) 1× (suspension)	Audi Aréna, Győr; Attendance: 2,279; Referees: Nagy, Túróczy

Round 15; 15 February 2022; 18:00	Vasas SC	26–45	Győri Audi ETO KC	Sterbinszky Amália Sportcsarnok, Budapest; Attendance: 500; Referees: Rontó, Szanyi
Round 15; 15 February 2022; 18:00	Kajdon 6	(15–22)	Pintea 8	Sterbinszky Amália Sportcsarnok, Budapest; Attendance: 500; Referees: Rontó, Szanyi
Round 15; 15 February 2022; 18:00	1× (yellow card) 2× (suspension)	Report	1× (suspension)	Sterbinszky Amália Sportcsarnok, Budapest; Attendance: 500; Referees: Rontó, Szanyi

Round 16; 25 February 2022; 18:00	Győri Audi ETO KC	37–21	Alba Fehérvár KC	Audi Aréna, Győr; Attendance: 1,842; Referees: Őri, Pozdena
Round 16; 25 February 2022; 18:00	Nze Minko 6	(16–11)	Besszer, Utasi 4	Audi Aréna, Győr; Attendance: 1,842; Referees: Őri, Pozdena
Round 16; 25 February 2022; 18:00	2× (yellow card) 2× (suspension)	Report	2× (suspension)	Audi Aréna, Győr; Attendance: 1,842; Referees: Őri, Pozdena

Round 17; 10 March 2022; 18:00	Győri Audi ETO KC	31–15	Kisvárdai KC	Audi Aréna, Győr; Attendance: 1,075; Referees: Haskó, Natkai
Round 17; 10 March 2022; 18:00	Pintea 5	(15–7)	Dombi 4	Audi Aréna, Győr; Attendance: 1,075; Referees: Haskó, Natkai
Round 17; 10 March 2022; 18:00	1× (yellow card)	Report	3× (suspension)	Audi Aréna, Győr; Attendance: 1,075; Referees: Haskó, Natkai

Round 18; 20 March 2022; 15:00	Szombathelyi KKA	24–45	Győri Audi ETO KC	Arena Savaria, Szombathely; Attendance: 800; Referees: Kovács, Mándli
Round 18; 20 March 2022; 15:00	Pődör 5	(13–21)	Lukács 7	Arena Savaria, Szombathely; Attendance: 800; Referees: Kovács, Mándli
Round 18; 20 March 2022; 15:00	1× (yellow card) 1× (suspension)	Report	1× (yellow card)	Arena Savaria, Szombathely; Attendance: 800; Referees: Kovács, Mándli

Round 23; 23 March 2022; 18:00	Győri Audi ETO KC	42–18	Érd HC	Audi Aréna, Győr; Attendance: 2,217; Referees: Kiu, Kiu
Round 23; 23 March 2022; 18:00	Dale 9	(22–8)	Szabó 6	Audi Aréna, Győr; Attendance: 2,217; Referees: Kiu, Kiu
Round 23; 23 March 2022; 18:00	2× (yellow card) 2× (suspension)	Report	1× (yellow card) 1× (suspension)	Audi Aréna, Győr; Attendance: 2,217; Referees: Kiu, Kiu

Round 19; 26 March 2022; 18:00	Győri Audi ETO KC	44–19	Moyra-Budaörs Handball	Audi Aréna, Győr; Attendance: 1,573; Referees: Paska, Vastag
Round 19; 26 March 2022; 18:00	Oftedal 7	(21–13)	Schneider 6	Audi Aréna, Győr; Attendance: 1,573; Referees: Paska, Vastag
Round 19; 26 March 2022; 18:00	2× (yellow card) 1× (suspension)	Report		Audi Aréna, Győr; Attendance: 1,573; Referees: Paska, Vastag

Round 24; 30 March 2022; 16:00	MTK Budapest	22–34	Győri Audi ETO KC	Sterbinszky Amália Sportcsarnok, Budapest; Attendance: 0 Referees: Asztalos, Szalay
Round 24; 30 March 2022; 16:00	Pál 7	(12–21)	Kristiansen, Nze Minko 5	Sterbinszky Amália Sportcsarnok, Budapest; Attendance: 0 Referees: Asztalos, Szalay
Round 24; 30 March 2022; 16:00	1× (yellow card) 2× (suspension) 1× (red card)	Report	2× (yellow card) 2× (suspension)	Sterbinszky Amália Sportcsarnok, Budapest; Attendance: 0 Referees: Asztalos, Szalay

Round 20; 2 April 2022; 18:00	Győri Audi ETO KC	37–27	Váci NKSE	Audi Aréna, Győr; Attendance: 2,466; Referees: Felhő, Öcsi
Round 20; 2 April 2022; 18:00	Nze Minko 7	(18–17)	Helembai 7	Audi Aréna, Győr; Attendance: 2,466; Referees: Felhő, Öcsi
Round 20; 2 April 2022; 18:00	2× (yellow card) 2× (suspension)	Report	1× (yellow card) 2× (suspension)	Audi Aréna, Győr; Attendance: 2,466; Referees: Felhő, Öcsi

Round 21; 7 April 2022; 18:30	Győri Audi ETO KC	35–33	Mosonmagyaróvári KC SE	Audi Aréna, Győr; Attendance: 2,009; Referees: Andorka, Hucker
Round 21; 7 April 2022; 18:30	Hansen 7	(15–14)	G. Tóth 8	Audi Aréna, Győr; Attendance: 2,009; Referees: Andorka, Hucker
Round 21; 7 April 2022; 18:30	1× (yellow card) 2× (suspension)	Report	1× (yellow card) 4× (suspension)	Audi Aréna, Győr; Attendance: 2,009; Referees: Andorka, Hucker

Round 22; 14 April 2022; 18:30	Ferencvárosi TC	29–24	Győri Audi ETO KC	Elek Gyula Aréna, Budapest; Attendance: 1,200; Referees: Bíró, Kiss
Round 22; 14 April 2022; 18:30	Klujber 9	(14–13)	Kristiansen, Oftedal 5	Elek Gyula Aréna, Budapest; Attendance: 1,200; Referees: Bíró, Kiss
Round 22; 14 April 2022; 18:30	1× (yellow card) 1× (suspension)	Report	1× (yellow card) 3× (suspension) 1× (red card)	Elek Gyula Aréna, Budapest; Attendance: 1,200; Referees: Bíró, Kiss

Round 25; 14 May 2022; 16:45	Győri Audi ETO KC	34–18	Dunaújvárosi Kohász KA	Audi Aréna, Győr; Attendance: 2,277; Referees: Kiu, Kiu
Round 25; 14 May 2022; 16:45	three players 5	(19–12)	Szalai 4	Audi Aréna, Győr; Attendance: 2,277; Referees: Kiu, Kiu
Round 25; 14 May 2022; 16:45	3× (suspension)	Report	2× (yellow card) 5× (suspension)	Audi Aréna, Győr; Attendance: 2,277; Referees: Kiu, Kiu

Round 26; 20 May 2022; 18:30	Debreceni VSC	25–28	Győri Audi ETO KC	Hódos Imre Sports Hall, Debrecen; Attendance: 2,000; Referees: Horváth, Marton
Round 26; 20 May 2022; 18:30	M. Vámos 7	(13–16)	three players 5	Hódos Imre Sports Hall, Debrecen; Attendance: 2,000; Referees: Horváth, Marton
Round 26; 20 May 2022; 18:30	2× (yellow card)	Report	1× (yellow card) 3× (suspension)	Hódos Imre Sports Hall, Debrecen; Attendance: 2,000; Referees: Horváth, Marton

==== Results overview ====
Opposition	Home score	Away score	Double
Alba Fehérvár KC	37–21	25–30	67–46
Moyra-Budaörs Handball	44–19	15–36	80–34
DVSC Schaeffler	31–23	25–28	59–48
Dunaújvárosi Kohász KA	34–18	26–36	70–44
Érd	42–18	0–10	52–18
FTC-Rail Cargo Hungaria	25–20	29–24	49–49
Kisvárda Master Good SE	31–15	25–31	62–40
MTK Budapest	10–0	22–34	44–22
Motherson-Mosonmagyaróvár	35–33	22–29	64–55
Siófok KC	40–26	32–40	80–58
Hungast-Szombathelyi KKA	44–25	24–45	89–49
Vasas	41–21	26–45	86–47
Váci NKSE	37–27	31–37	74–58

=== Hungarian Cup ===
==== Round 5 ====
Round 5; 9 March 2022; 18:00	Győri Audi ETO KC	33–19	Kisvárdai KC	Audi Aréna, Győr; Attendance: 1,841; Referees: Kovács-Sebők, Réti
Round 5; 9 March 2022; 18:00	Pintea 7	(17–12)	Siska 4	Audi Aréna, Győr; Attendance: 1,841; Referees: Kovács-Sebők, Réti
Round 5; 9 March 2022; 18:00	1× (yellow card) 2× (suspension)	Report	1× (yellow card) 3× (suspension)	Audi Aréna, Győr; Attendance: 1,841; Referees: Kovács-Sebők, Réti

==== Semi-final ====
Semi-final; 28 May 2022; 18:15	Győri Audi ETO KC	39–18	Dunaújvárosi Kohász KA	Főnix Hall, Debrecen; Attendance: 2,000; Referees: Kovács-Sebők, Réti
Semi-final; 28 May 2022; 18:15	Hansen 8	(18–9)	Krupják-Molnár, Matucza 4	Főnix Hall, Debrecen; Attendance: 2,000; Referees: Kovács-Sebők, Réti
Semi-final; 28 May 2022; 18:15	1× (yellow card) 4× (suspension)	Report	1× (yellow card) 3× (suspension)	Főnix Hall, Debrecen; Attendance: 2,000; Referees: Kovács-Sebők, Réti

==== Final ====
Final; 29 May 2022; 17:45	Győri Audi ETO KC	22–26	Ferencvárosi TC	Főnix Hall, Debrecen; Attendance: 2,800; Referees: Andorka, Hucker
Final; 29 May 2022; 17:45	Kristiansen 6	(12–12)	Malestein 7	Főnix Hall, Debrecen; Attendance: 2,800; Referees: Andorka, Hucker
Final; 29 May 2022; 17:45	1× (suspension)	Report	1× (yellow card) 3× (suspension)	Főnix Hall, Debrecen; Attendance: 2,800; Referees: Andorka, Hucker

=== EHF Champions League ===
==== Group stage ====
Pos	Team	Pld	W	D	L	GF	GA	GD	Pts	Qualification	GYO	VIP	MET	MOS	ODE	KRI	SÄV	KAS
1	(Hungary) Győri Audi ETO KC	14	13	0	1	471	354	+117	26	Quarterfinals	—	35–29	39–30	32–22	27–26	40–27	41–19	37–20
2	(Norway) Vipers Kristiansand	14	10	0	4	435	370	+65	20	Quarterfinals	30–29	—	25–31	24–27	31–27	37–20	34–25	39–25
3	(France) Metz Handball	14	9	1	4	413	375	+38	19	Playoffs	29–33	23–18	—	24–32	38–31	27–27	35–21	33–25
4	(Russia) CSKA Moscow	14	7	2	5	375	372	+3	16	Playoffs	23–27	28–32	27–26	—	21–28	21–21	29–28	34–27
5	(Denmark) Odense Håndbold	14	7	1	6	405	386	+19	15	Playoffs	26–31	27–32	21–27	27–27	—	26–24	37–24	37–29
6	(Slovenia) RK Krim Mercator	14	4	2	8	362	381	−19	10	Playoffs	26–31	26–27	28–29	24–21	19–24	—	32–18	36–28
7	(Sweden) IK Sävehof	14	3	0	11	351	461	−110	6		25–31	23–42	28–31	23–32	31–37	29–28	—	28–26
8	(Turkey) Kastamonu Bld. GSK	14	0	0	14	349	462	−113	0		22–38	24–35	20–30	29–31	25–31	23–24	26–29	—

Source: EHF
Rules for classification: Tiebreakers

===== Matches =====
11 September 2021; 18:00	Győri Audi ETO KC	35–29	(Norway) Vipers Kristiansand	Audi Aréna, Győr; Attendance: 3,862; Referees: Gasmi, Gasmi (FRA)
11 September 2021; 18:00	Lukács 7	(17–13)	Dahl 12	Audi Aréna, Győr; Attendance: 3,862; Referees: Gasmi, Gasmi (FRA)
11 September 2021; 18:00	3× (suspension)	Report	5× (suspension)	Audi Aréna, Győr; Attendance: 3,862; Referees: Gasmi, Gasmi (FRA)

18 September 2021; 18:00	RK Krim Mercator (Slovenia)	26–31	Győri Audi ETO KC	Arena Stožice, Ljubljana; Attendance: 542; Referees: Ilieva, Karbeska (MKD)
18 September 2021; 18:00	Sercien-Ugolin 5	(12–13)	Kristiansen, Ryu 7	Arena Stožice, Ljubljana; Attendance: 542; Referees: Ilieva, Karbeska (MKD)
18 September 2021; 18:00	2× (yellow card) 1× (suspension)	Report	1× (yellow card) 2× (suspension)	Arena Stožice, Ljubljana; Attendance: 542; Referees: Ilieva, Karbeska (MKD)

26 September 2021; 16:00	Győri Audi ETO KC	32–22	(Russia) CSKA Moscow	Audi Aréna, Győr; Attendance: 4,071; Referees: Álvarez, Bustamante (ESP)
26 September 2021; 16:00	Oftedal 5	(17–15)	Gros, Sabirova 6	Audi Aréna, Győr; Attendance: 4,071; Referees: Álvarez, Bustamante (ESP)
26 September 2021; 16:00	3× (suspension) 1× (red card)	Report	2× (yellow card) 3× (suspension)	Audi Aréna, Győr; Attendance: 4,071; Referees: Álvarez, Bustamante (ESP)

17 October 2021; 16:00	Odense Håndbold (Denmark)	26–31	Győri Audi ETO KC	Sydbank Arena Odense, Odense; Attendance: 1,556; Referees: Carmaux, Mursch (FRA)
17 October 2021; 16:00	Housheer 7	(11–16)	Ryu, Schatzl 6	Sydbank Arena Odense, Odense; Attendance: 1,556; Referees: Carmaux, Mursch (FRA)
17 October 2021; 16:00	1× (yellow card) 6× (suspension)	Report	1× (yellow card) 6× (suspension)	Sydbank Arena Odense, Odense; Attendance: 1,556; Referees: Carmaux, Mursch (FRA)

23 October 2021; 18:00	Metz Handball (France)	29–33	Győri Audi ETO KC	Arènes de Metz, Metz; Attendance: 4,051; Referees: Năstase, Stancu (ROU)
23 October 2021; 18:00	de Paula 7	(15–16)	Nze Minko 6	Arènes de Metz, Metz; Attendance: 4,051; Referees: Năstase, Stancu (ROU)
23 October 2021; 18:00	2× (yellow card) 2× (suspension)	Report	1× (yellow card) 1× (suspension)	Arènes de Metz, Metz; Attendance: 4,051; Referees: Năstase, Stancu (ROU)

30 October 2021; 16:00	Győri Audi ETO KC	41–19	(Sweden) IK Sävehof	Audi Aréna, Győr; Attendance: 3,945; Referees: Ershov, Pavliukov (RUS)
30 October 2021; 16:00	Blohm 7	(20–9)	Roberts 5	Audi Aréna, Győr; Attendance: 3,945; Referees: Ershov, Pavliukov (RUS)
30 October 2021; 16:00	1× (yellow card)	Report	2× (yellow card)	Audi Aréna, Győr; Attendance: 3,945; Referees: Ershov, Pavliukov (RUS)

13 November 2021; 18:00	Győri Audi ETO KC	37–20	(Turkey) Kastamonu Bld. GSK	Audi Aréna, Győr; Attendance: 3,100; Referees: Duplii, Pobedrina (UKR)
13 November 2021; 18:00	Nze Minko 6	(19–9)	Radičević 11	Audi Aréna, Győr; Attendance: 3,100; Referees: Duplii, Pobedrina (UKR)
13 November 2021; 18:00	1× (yellow card) 2× (suspension)	Report	1× (yellow card) 3× (suspension)	Audi Aréna, Győr; Attendance: 3,100; Referees: Duplii, Pobedrina (UKR)

20 November 2021; 18:00	Kastamonu Bld. GSK (Turkey)	22–38	Győri Audi ETO KC	Kastamonu Atatürk Sport Hall, Kastamonu; Attendance: 2,627; Referees: Ilieva, Karbeska (MKD)
20 November 2021; 18:00	Kovářová, Radičević 4	(9–19)	Pintea 6	Kastamonu Atatürk Sport Hall, Kastamonu; Attendance: 2,627; Referees: Ilieva, Karbeska (MKD)
20 November 2021; 18:00		Report		Kastamonu Atatürk Sport Hall, Kastamonu; Attendance: 2,627; Referees: Ilieva, Karbeska (MKD)

15 January 2022; 16:00	Győri Audi ETO KC	39–30	(France) Metz Handball	Audi Aréna, Győr; Attendance: 4,177; Referees: Alpaidze, Berezkina (RUS)
15 January 2022; 16:00	Kristiansen 10	(20–13)	Horacek 8	Audi Aréna, Győr; Attendance: 4,177; Referees: Alpaidze, Berezkina (RUS)
15 January 2022; 16:00	3× (suspension)	Report	6× (suspension)	Audi Aréna, Győr; Attendance: 4,177; Referees: Alpaidze, Berezkina (RUS)

19 January 2022; 18:45	Győri Audi ETO KC	40–27	(Slovenia) RK Krim Mercator	Audi Aréna, Győr; Attendance: 2,547; Referees: Vranes, Wenninger (AUT)
19 January 2022; 18:45	Hansen, Pintea 8	(22–14)	Lekić, Varagić 5	Audi Aréna, Győr; Attendance: 2,547; Referees: Vranes, Wenninger (AUT)
19 January 2022; 18:45	1× (yellow card) 2× (suspension)	Report	3× (suspension)	Audi Aréna, Győr; Attendance: 2,547; Referees: Vranes, Wenninger (AUT)

23 January 2022; 16:00	Győri Audi ETO KC	27–26	(Denmark) Odense Håndbold	Audi Aréna, Győr; Attendance: 3,900; Referees: Lončar, Lončar (CRO)
23 January 2022; 16:00	Nze Minko, Oftedal 5	(12–13)	Højlund 9	Audi Aréna, Győr; Attendance: 3,900; Referees: Lončar, Lončar (CRO)
23 January 2022; 16:00	3× (suspension)	Report	1× (yellow card) 5× (suspension)	Audi Aréna, Győr; Attendance: 3,900; Referees: Lončar, Lončar (CRO)

6 February 2022; 16:00	CSKA Moscow (Russia)	23–27	Győri Audi ETO KC	Alexander Gomelsky Universal Sports Hall CSKA, Moscow; Attendance: 1,100; Referees: Pandžić, Mošorinski (SRB)
6 February 2022; 16:00	Ilina 8	(13–15)	Ryu 7	Alexander Gomelsky Universal Sports Hall CSKA, Moscow; Attendance: 1,100; Referees: Pandžić, Mošorinski (SRB)
6 February 2022; 16:00	1× (yellow card) 1× (suspension)	Report	3× (suspension)	Alexander Gomelsky Universal Sports Hall CSKA, Moscow; Attendance: 1,100; Referees: Pandžić, Mošorinski (SRB)

13 February 2022; 16:00	IK Sävehof (Sweden)	25–31	Győri Audi ETO KC	Partille Arena, Partille; Attendance: 1,275; Referees: Kijauskaitė, Žalienė (LTU)
13 February 2022; 16:00	Roberts 7	(12–15)	Hansen 6	Partille Arena, Partille; Attendance: 1,275; Referees: Kijauskaitė, Žalienė (LTU)
13 February 2022; 16:00	2× (yellow card) 2× (suspension)	Report	1× (yellow card) 1× (suspension)	Partille Arena, Partille; Attendance: 1,275; Referees: Kijauskaitė, Žalienė (LTU)

19 February 2022; 18:00	Vipers Kristiansand (Norway)	30–29	Győri Audi ETO KC	Aquarama Kristiansand, Kristiansand; Attendance: 1,900; Referees: Budzák, Záhradník (SVK)
19 February 2022; 18:00	Gulldén, Jeřábková 6	(16–13)	Hansen 6	Aquarama Kristiansand, Kristiansand; Attendance: 1,900; Referees: Budzák, Záhradník (SVK)
19 February 2022; 18:00	1× (suspension)	Report	3× (suspension)	Aquarama Kristiansand, Kristiansand; Attendance: 1,900; Referees: Budzák, Záhradník (SVK)

===== Results overview =====
Opposition	Home score	Away score	Double
(Russia) CSKA Moscow	32–22	23–27	59–45
(Norway) Vipers Kristiansand	35–29	30–29	64–59
(Slovenia) RK Krim Mercator	40–27	26–31	71–53
(Denmark) Odense Håndbold	27–26	26–31	58–52
(France) Metz Handball	39–30	29–33	72–59
(Turkey) Kastamonu Bld. GSK	37–20	22–38	75–42
(Sweden) IK Sävehof	41–19	25–31	72–44

==== Knockout stage ====
===== Quarter-finals =====
30 April 2022; 18:00	Brest Bretagne Handball (France)	21–21	Győri Audi ETO KC	Brest Arena, Brest; Attendance: 4,094; Referees: Sá, Sá (POR)
30 April 2022; 18:00	Fauske 5	(11–8)	Kristiansen 6	Brest Arena, Brest; Attendance: 4,094; Referees: Sá, Sá (POR)
30 April 2022; 18:00	3× (suspension)	Report	2× (yellow card) 6× (suspension)	Brest Arena, Brest; Attendance: 4,094; Referees: Sá, Sá (POR)

7 May 2022; 16:00	Győri Audi ETO KC	35–23	(France) Brest Bretagne Handball	Audi Aréna, Győr; Attendance: 5,229; Referees: Bolic, Hurich (AUT)
7 May 2022; 16:00	Oftedal 9	(20–12)	Foppa, Løseth 5	Audi Aréna, Győr; Attendance: 5,229; Referees: Bolic, Hurich (AUT)
7 May 2022; 16:00	1× (yellow card) 3× (suspension)	Report	1× (suspension)	Audi Aréna, Győr; Attendance: 5,229; Referees: Bolic, Hurich (AUT)

===== Semi-final =====
4 June 2022; 15:15	Győri Audi ETO KC	32–27	(Denmark) Team Esbjerg	MVM Dome, Budapest; Referees: Vranes, Wenninger (AUT)
4 June 2022; 15:15	Oftedal 5	(15–15)	Reistad 8	MVM Dome, Budapest; Referees: Vranes, Wenninger (AUT)
4 June 2022; 15:15	5× (suspension)	Report	6× (suspension) 2× (red card)	MVM Dome, Budapest; Referees: Vranes, Wenninger (AUT)

===== Final =====
5 June 2022; 18:00	Győri Audi ETO KC	31–33	(Norway) Vipers Kristiansand	MVM Dome, Budapest; Attendance: 15,400; Referees: Merz, Kuttler (GER)
5 June 2022; 18:00	Hansen 6	(13–15)	Jeřábková 7	MVM Dome, Budapest; Attendance: 15,400; Referees: Merz, Kuttler (GER)
5 June 2022; 18:00		Report		MVM Dome, Budapest; Attendance: 15,400; Referees: Merz, Kuttler (GER)

== Statistics ==
=== Top scorers ===
Includes all competitive matches. The list is sorted by shirt number when total goals are equal.

Position	Nation	No.	Name	Hungarian League	Hungarian Cup	Champions League	Total
1	(Denmark)	8	Anne Mette Hansen	82	14	58	154
2	(Norway)	21	Veronica Kristiansen	81	11	54	146
3	(Sweden)	5	Linn Blohm	85	11	45	141
4	(France)	27	Estelle Nze Minko	80	5	56	141
5	(South Korea)	11	Ryu Eun-hee	55	8	58	121
6	(Norway)	7	Kari Brattset Dale	75	3	40	118
7	(Norway)	15	Stine Bredal Oftedal	55	1	62	118
8	(Romania)	77	Crina Pintea	57	12	47	117
9	(Hungary)	22	Viktória Lukács	61	8	35	104
10	(Hungary)	23	Csenge Fodor	54	5	37	96
11	(Hungary)	6	Nadine Schatzl	45	4	44	93
12	(Hungary)	45	Noémi Háfra	43	5	18	65
13	(Hungary)	48	Dorottya Faluvégi	28	4	15	47
14	(Montenegro)	80	Jelena Despotović	14	0	10	24
15	(Hungary)	4	Eszter Ogonovszky	18	0	1	19
16	(Hungary)	55	Laura Kürthi	7	1	0	8
17	(Norway)	16	Silje Solberg	2	1	4	7
18	(France)	1	Laura Glauser	2	0	3	5
19	(Hungary)	9	Szonja Szemes	5	0	0	5
20	(Hungary)	2	Fanni Gerencsér	2	0	1	3
21	(Hungary)	81	Júlia Farkas	3	0	0	3
22	(Hungary)	10	Kyra Sztankovics	0	0	2	2
23	(France)	12	Amandine Leynaud	1	1	0	2
			TOTALS	856	94	590	1,540

=== Attendances ===
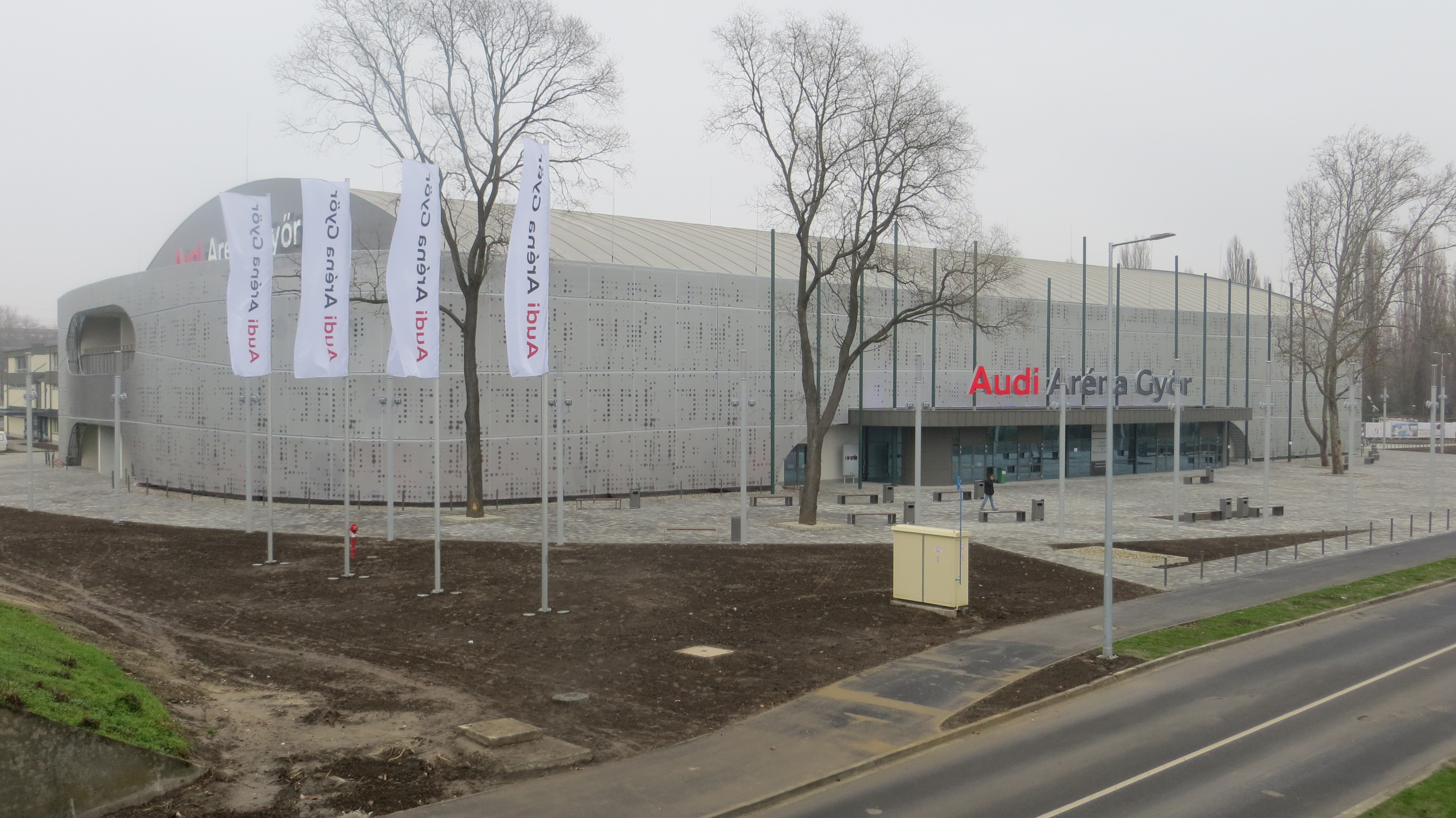
Home hall: Audi Aréna

List of the home matches:

Round	Against	Attendance	Capatility	Date
CL-(GS) 1.	Kristiansand (Norway)	3,862	70,2%	September 11, 2021
NB I- 2.	Vasas Budapest	1,341	24,4%	September 14, 2021
CL-(GS) 3.	Moscow (Russia)	4,071	74,0%	September 26, 2021
NB I- 5.	Szombathely	1,655	30%	October 20, 2021
CL-(GS) 6.	Sävehof (Sweden)	3,945	71,7%	October 30, 2021
CL-(GS) 7.	Kastamonu (Turkey)	3,100	56,4%	November 13, 2021
NB I- 9.	Ferencváros Budapest	5,030	91,5%	November 17, 2021
CL-(GS) 9.	Metz (France)	4,177	75,9%	January 15, 2022
CL-(GS) 10.	Krim (Slovenia)	2,547	46,3%	January 19, 2022
CL-(GS) 11.	Odense (Denmark)	3,900	70,9%	January 23, 2022
NB I- 13.	Debrecen	1,785	32,5%	January 28, 2022
NB I- 14.	Siófok	2,279	41,4%	February 9, 2022
NB I- 16.	Székesfehérvár	1,842	33,5%	February 25, 2022
CUP - V.	Kisvárda	1,846	33,6%	March 9, 2022
NB I- 17.	Kisvárda	1,075	19,6%	March 10, 2022
NB I- 23.	Érd	2,217	40,3%	March 23, 2022
NB I- 19.	Budaörs	1,573	28,6%	March 26, 2022
NB I- 20.	Vác	2,466	44,8%	April 2, 2022
CL-QF	Brest (France)	5,229	95%	May 7, 2022
NB I- 25.	Dunaújváros	2,277	41,4%	May 14, 2022
