= 2021–22 Women's EHF Champions League group stage =

The 2021–22 Women's EHF Champions League group stage began on 11 September 2021 and concluded on 20 February 2022 to determine the ten teams who advanced to the knockout stage of the 2021–22 Women's EHF Champions League.

== Draw ==
The draw was held on 2 July 2020 in Vienna, Austria.

=== Seeding ===
The composition of the seeding pots for the group stage draw was announced on 30 June 2021. From each pot, two teams were drawn into Group A and the other two in Group B. Teams from the same national association were not drawn into the same group.

Seeding pots for Groups A and B
Pot 1	Pot 2	Pot 3	Pot 4
(Hungary) FTC-Rail Cargo Hungaria (France) Brest Bretagne Handball (Russia) CSKA Moscow (Norway) Vipers Kristiansand	(Romania) CSM București (Montenegro) Budućnost BEMAX (Denmark) Odense Håndbold (Slovenia) RK Krim Mercator	(Germany) BV Borussia 09 Dortmund (Hungary) Győri Audi ETO KC (France) Metz Handball (Russia) Rostov-Don	(Croatia) HC Podravka Vegeta (Sweden) IK Sävehof (Turkey) Kastamonu Bld. GSK (Denmark) Team Esbjerg

== Format ==
In each group, teams played against each other in a double round-robin format, with home and away matches.

== Tiebreakers ==
In the group stage, teams were ranked according to points (2 points for a win, 1 point for a draw, 0 points for a loss). After completion of the group stage, if two or more teams have the same number of points, the ranking is determined as follows:

1. Highest number of points in matches between the teams directly involved;
2. Superior goal difference in matches between the teams directly involved;
3. Highest number of goals scored in matches between the teams directly involved (or in the away match in case of a two-team tie);
4. Superior goal difference in all matches of the group;
5. Highest number of plus goals in all matches of the group;

If the ranking of one of these teams is determined, the above criteria are consecutively followed until the ranking of all teams is determined. If no ranking can be determined, a decision shall be obtained by EHF through drawing of lots.

== Groups ==
The matchdays were 11–12 September, 18–19 September, 25–26 September, 16–17 October, 23–24 October, 30–31 October, 13–14 November, 20–21 November 2021, 8–9 January, 15–16 January, 22–23 January, 5–6 February, 12–13 February, 19–20 February 2021.

Times until 30 October 2021 are UTC+2, from 31 October 2021 on times are UTC+1.

Due to the COVID-19 pandemic, each local health department allows a different number of spectators.

=== Group A ===
Pos	Team	Pld	W	D	L	GF	GA	GD	Pts	Qualification
1	(Denmark) Team Esbjerg	14	10	3	1	412	346	+66	23	Quarterfinals
2	(Russia) Rostov-Don	14	10	1	3	362	302	+60	21	Quarterfinals
3	(Hungary) FTC-Rail Cargo Hungaria	14	8	3	3	378	372	+6	19	Playoffs
4	(France) Brest Bretagne Handball	14	8	1	5	392	365	+27	17	Playoffs
5	(Romania) CSM București	14	7	1	6	365	342	+23	15	Playoffs
6	(Germany) BV Borussia 09 Dortmund	14	4	1	9	391	399	−8	9	Playoffs
7	(Montenegro) Budućnost BEMAX	14	3	0	11	337	407	−70	6	
8	(Croatia) HC Podravka Vegeta	14	1	0	13	334	438	−104	2	

Source: EHF
Rules for classification: Tiebreakers

11 September 2021; 16:00	BV Borussia 09 Dortmund (Germany)	25–25	(Hungary) FTC-Rail Cargo Hungaria	Helmut-Körnig-Halle, Dortmund; Attendance: 150; Referees: Christiansen, Hansen (DEN)
11 September 2021; 16:00	Grijseels 9	(12–14)	Bölk, Malestein 6	Helmut-Körnig-Halle, Dortmund; Attendance: 150; Referees: Christiansen, Hansen (DEN)
11 September 2021; 16:00	1× (yellow card) 2× (suspension)	Report	2× (yellow card) 5× (suspension)	Helmut-Körnig-Halle, Dortmund; Attendance: 150; Referees: Christiansen, Hansen (DEN)

11 September 2021; 16:00	Rostov-Don (Russia)	26–24	(France) Brest Bretagne Handball	Rostov-on-Don Palace of Sports, Rostov-on-Don; Attendance: 1,177; Referees: Antić, Jakovljević (SRB)
11 September 2021; 16:00	Frolova 6	(16–13)	Jauković 6	Rostov-on-Don Palace of Sports, Rostov-on-Don; Attendance: 1,177; Referees: Antić, Jakovljević (SRB)
11 September 2021; 16:00	1× (yellow card) 4× (suspension)	Report	4× (suspension)	Rostov-on-Don Palace of Sports, Rostov-on-Don; Attendance: 1,177; Referees: Antić, Jakovljević (SRB)

11 September 2021; 18:00	HC Podravka Vegeta (Croatia)	29–22	(Montenegro) Budućnost BEMAX	ŠSD "Josip Samaržija-Bepo", Koprivnica; Attendance: 300; Referees: Backović, Palačković (SLO)
11 September 2021; 18:00	Milosavljević, Kalaus 6	(22–12)	Maslova 8	ŠSD "Josip Samaržija-Bepo", Koprivnica; Attendance: 300; Referees: Backović, Palačković (SLO)
11 September 2021; 18:00	2× (yellow card) 7× (suspension)	Report	3× (suspension)	ŠSD "Josip Samaržija-Bepo", Koprivnica; Attendance: 300; Referees: Backović, Palačković (SLO)

12 September 2021; 14:00	Team Esbjerg (Denmark)	22–21	(Romania) CSM București	Blue Water Dokken, Esbjerg; Attendance: 1,850; Referees: Vranes, Wenninger (AUT)
12 September 2021; 14:00	Reistad, Tranborg 5	(13–10)	Omoregie 5	Blue Water Dokken, Esbjerg; Attendance: 1,850; Referees: Vranes, Wenninger (AUT)
12 September 2021; 14:00	1× (yellow card) 3× (suspension)	Report	1× (yellow card) 4× (suspension)	Blue Water Dokken, Esbjerg; Attendance: 1,850; Referees: Vranes, Wenninger (AUT)

18 September 2021; 16:00	FTC-Rail Cargo Hungaria (Hungary)	33–27	(Croatia) HC Podravka Vegeta	Érd Aréna, Érd; Attendance: 1,200; Referees: Konjičanin, Konjičanin (BIH)
18 September 2021; 16:00	Malestein 9	(15–15)	Milosavljević, Mugoša 5	Érd Aréna, Érd; Attendance: 1,200; Referees: Konjičanin, Konjičanin (BIH)
18 September 2021; 16:00	4× (suspension)	Report	3× (suspension)	Érd Aréna, Érd; Attendance: 1,200; Referees: Konjičanin, Konjičanin (BIH)

18 September 2021; 16:00	CSM București (Romania)	27–30	(Russia) Rostov-Don	Polyvalent Hall, Bucharest; Attendance: 1,200; Referees: Covalciuc, Covalciuc (MDA)
18 September 2021; 16:00	Arntzen 8	(9–13)	six players 4	Polyvalent Hall, Bucharest; Attendance: 1,200; Referees: Covalciuc, Covalciuc (MDA)
18 September 2021; 16:00	1× (yellow card) 3× (suspension)	Report	4× (suspension)	Polyvalent Hall, Bucharest; Attendance: 1,200; Referees: Covalciuc, Covalciuc (MDA)

18 September 2021; 18:00	Brest Bretagne Handball (France)	26–23	(Denmark) Team Esbjerg	Brest Arena, Brest; Attendance: 2,410; Referees: Barysas, Petrušis (LTU)
18 September 2021; 18:00	three players 4	(13–9)	Reistad 6	Brest Arena, Brest; Attendance: 2,410; Referees: Barysas, Petrušis (LTU)
18 September 2021; 18:00	1× (suspension)	Report	3× (suspension)	Brest Arena, Brest; Attendance: 2,410; Referees: Barysas, Petrušis (LTU)

19 September 2021; 16:00	Budućnost BEMAX (Montenegro)	29–34	(Germany) BV Borussia 09 Dortmund	Bemax Hall, Podgorica; Attendance: 100; Referees: Alpaidze, Berezkina (RUS)
19 September 2021; 16:00	Pletikosić 7	(15–18)	Grijseels 11	Bemax Hall, Podgorica; Attendance: 100; Referees: Alpaidze, Berezkina (RUS)
19 September 2021; 16:00	1× (yellow card) 5× (suspension)	Report	1× (yellow card) 3× (suspension)	Bemax Hall, Podgorica; Attendance: 100; Referees: Alpaidze, Berezkina (RUS)

25 September 2021; 16:00	Rostov-Don (Russia)	19–20	(Hungary) FTC-Rail Cargo Hungaria	Rostov-on-Don Palace of Sports, Rostov-on-Don; Attendance: 2,751; Referees: Hatipoğlu, Şimşek (TUR)
25 September 2021; 16:00	Managarova 5	(8–11)	Bölk 6	Rostov-on-Don Palace of Sports, Rostov-on-Don; Attendance: 2,751; Referees: Hatipoğlu, Şimşek (TUR)
25 September 2021; 16:00	2× (yellow card) 1× (suspension)	Report	3× (yellow card) 5× (suspension)	Rostov-on-Don Palace of Sports, Rostov-on-Don; Attendance: 2,751; Referees: Hatipoğlu, Şimşek (TUR)

25 September 2021; 18:00	BV Borussia 09 Dortmund (Germany)	30–27	(France) Brest Bretagne Handball	Helmut-Körnig-Halle, Dortmund; Attendance: 120; Referees: Lindenbaum, Laron (ISR)
25 September 2021; 18:00	Grijseels 9	(15–9)	Niakaté 7	Helmut-Körnig-Halle, Dortmund; Attendance: 120; Referees: Lindenbaum, Laron (ISR)
25 September 2021; 18:00	1× (yellow card) 2× (suspension)	Report	2× (yellow card) 2× (suspension)	Helmut-Körnig-Halle, Dortmund; Attendance: 120; Referees: Lindenbaum, Laron (ISR)

25 September 2021; 18:00	HC Podravka Vegeta (Croatia)	31–36	(Romania) CSM București	ŠSD "Josip Samaržija-Bepo", Koprivnica; Attendance: 250; Referees: Duplii, Pobedrina (UKR)
25 September 2021; 18:00	Kalaus, Milosavljević 7	(15–16)	Neagu 14	ŠSD "Josip Samaržija-Bepo", Koprivnica; Attendance: 250; Referees: Duplii, Pobedrina (UKR)
25 September 2021; 18:00	2× (yellow card) 4× (suspension)	Report	5× (suspension)	ŠSD "Josip Samaržija-Bepo", Koprivnica; Attendance: 250; Referees: Duplii, Pobedrina (UKR)

26 September 2021; 14:00	Team Esbjerg (Denmark)	35–20	(Montenegro) Budućnost BEMAX	Blue Water Dokken, Esbjerg; Attendance: 1,783; Referees: Lidacka, Lesiak (POL)
26 September 2021; 14:00	Türkoglu 6	(16–10)	Pavićević 5	Blue Water Dokken, Esbjerg; Attendance: 1,783; Referees: Lidacka, Lesiak (POL)
26 September 2021; 14:00	1× (yellow card) 2× (suspension)	Report	4× (suspension)	Blue Water Dokken, Esbjerg; Attendance: 1,783; Referees: Lidacka, Lesiak (POL)

16 October 2021; 16:00	FTC-Rail Cargo Hungaria (Hungary)	31–31	(Denmark) Team Esbjerg	Érd Aréna, Érd; Attendance: 1,600; Referees: Antić, Jakovljević (SRB)
16 October 2021; 16:00	Malestein 10	(16–16)	Reistad 10	Érd Aréna, Érd; Attendance: 1,600; Referees: Antić, Jakovljević (SRB)
16 October 2021; 16:00	1× (yellow card) 3× (suspension)	Report	1× (yellow card) 3× (suspension)	Érd Aréna, Érd; Attendance: 1,600; Referees: Antić, Jakovljević (SRB)

16 October 2021; 18:00	Brest Bretagne Handball (France)	35–22	(Croatia) HC Podravka Vegeta	Brest Arena, Brest; Attendance: 3,301; Referees: Doychinov, Goretsov (BUL)
16 October 2021; 18:00	Foppa 7	(17–9)	Milosavljević 6	Brest Arena, Brest; Attendance: 3,301; Referees: Doychinov, Goretsov (BUL)
16 October 2021; 18:00	3× (suspension)	Report	1× (yellow card) 5× (suspension) 1× (red card)	Brest Arena, Brest; Attendance: 3,301; Referees: Doychinov, Goretsov (BUL)

17 October 2021; 16:00	Budućnost BEMAX (Montenegro)	19–25	(Russia) Rostov-Don	Bemax Hall, Podgorica; Attendance: 100; Referees: Ilieva, Karbeska (MKD)
17 October 2021; 16:00	Pletikosić 5	(10–14)	Sen, Zaadi 6	Bemax Hall, Podgorica; Attendance: 100; Referees: Ilieva, Karbeska (MKD)
17 October 2021; 16:00	2× (yellow card) 1× (suspension)	Report	3× (yellow card) 1× (suspension)	Bemax Hall, Podgorica; Attendance: 100; Referees: Ilieva, Karbeska (MKD)

17 October 2021; 16:00	BV Borussia 09 Dortmund (Germany)	22–25	(Romania) CSM București	Helmut-Körnig-Halle, Dortmund; Attendance: 450; Referees: Erdoğan, Özdeniz (TUR)
17 October 2021; 16:00	Bermejo, Zschocke 5	(11–12)	Neagu 6	Helmut-Körnig-Halle, Dortmund; Attendance: 450; Referees: Erdoğan, Özdeniz (TUR)
17 October 2021; 16:00	1× (yellow card) 2× (suspension)	Report	1× (yellow card) 5× (suspension)	Helmut-Körnig-Halle, Dortmund; Attendance: 450; Referees: Erdoğan, Özdeniz (TUR)

23 October 2021; 16:00	FTC-Rail Cargo Hungaria (Hungary)	28–27	(France) Brest Bretagne Handball	Érd Aréna, Érd; Attendance: 1,800; Referees: Alpaidze, Berezkina (RUS)
23 October 2021; 16:00	Bölk 8	(15–17)	Toublanc 8	Érd Aréna, Érd; Attendance: 1,800; Referees: Alpaidze, Berezkina (RUS)
23 October 2021; 16:00	1× (yellow card) 2× (suspension)	Report	1× (suspension)	Érd Aréna, Érd; Attendance: 1,800; Referees: Alpaidze, Berezkina (RUS)

23 October 2021; 16:00	Rostov-Don (Russia)	37–27	(Germany) BV Borussia 09 Dortmund	Rostov-on-Don Palace of Sports, Rostov-on-Don; Attendance: 2,357; Referees: Konjičanin, Konjičanin (BIH)
23 October 2021; 16:00	Zaadi 8	(17–11)	Zschocke 6	Rostov-on-Don Palace of Sports, Rostov-on-Don; Attendance: 2,357; Referees: Konjičanin, Konjičanin (BIH)
23 October 2021; 16:00	1× (yellow card) 4× (suspension)	Report	3× (suspension)	Rostov-on-Don Palace of Sports, Rostov-on-Don; Attendance: 2,357; Referees: Konjičanin, Konjičanin (BIH)

23 October 2021; 18:00	HC Podravka Vegeta (Croatia)	26–27	(Denmark) Team Esbjerg	ŠSD "Josip Samaržija-Bepo", Koprivnica; Attendance: 200; Referees: Covalciuc, Covalciuc (MDA)
23 October 2021; 18:00	Milosavljević 7	(9–15)	Breistøl 8	ŠSD "Josip Samaržija-Bepo", Koprivnica; Attendance: 200; Referees: Covalciuc, Covalciuc (MDA)
23 October 2021; 18:00	3× (yellow card) 4× (suspension)	Report	3× (suspension)	ŠSD "Josip Samaržija-Bepo", Koprivnica; Attendance: 200; Referees: Covalciuc, Covalciuc (MDA)

24 October 2021; 14:00	CSM București (Romania)	30–22	(Montenegro) Budućnost BEMAX	Polyvalent Hall, Bucharest; Attendance: 1,800; Referees: Christidi, Papamattheou (GRE)
24 October 2021; 14:00	Neagu 6	(14–10)	Pletikosić 5	Polyvalent Hall, Bucharest; Attendance: 1,800; Referees: Christidi, Papamattheou (GRE)
24 October 2021; 14:00	1× (yellow card) 2× (suspension)	Report	1× (yellow card) 3× (suspension)	Polyvalent Hall, Bucharest; Attendance: 1,800; Referees: Christidi, Papamattheou (GRE)

30 October 2021; 16:00	CSM București (Romania)	29–30	(France) Brest Bretagne Handball	Polyvalent Hall, Bucharest; Attendance: 0 (Note: The match was played behind closed doors due to the COVID-19 pandemic.); Referees: Christiansen, Hansen (DEN)
30 October 2021; 16:00	Neagu 10	(16–14)	Niakaté 10	Polyvalent Hall, Bucharest; Attendance: 0 Referees: Christiansen, Hansen (DEN)
30 October 2021; 16:00	2× (yellow card) 5× (suspension)	Report	4× (suspension)	Polyvalent Hall, Bucharest; Attendance: 0 Referees: Christiansen, Hansen (DEN)

30 October 2021; 18:00	Budućnost BEMAX (Montenegro)	26–30	(Hungary) FTC-Rail Cargo Hungaria	Morača Sports Center, Podgorica; Attendance: 300; Referees: Duplii, Pobedrina (UKR)
30 October 2021; 18:00	Pletikosić 7	(13–13)	Malestein 9	Morača Sports Center, Podgorica; Attendance: 300; Referees: Duplii, Pobedrina (UKR)
30 October 2021; 18:00	5× (suspension)	Report	3× (yellow card) 3× (suspension)	Morača Sports Center, Podgorica; Attendance: 300; Referees: Duplii, Pobedrina (UKR)

31 October 2021; 14:00	BV Borussia 09 Dortmund (Germany)	38–14	(Croatia) HC Podravka Vegeta	Helmut-Körnig-Halle, Dortmund; Attendance: 450; Referees: Christidi, Papamattheou (GRE)
31 October 2021; 14:00	Grijseels 15	(16–8)	Kalaus 9	Helmut-Körnig-Halle, Dortmund; Attendance: 450; Referees: Christidi, Papamattheou (GRE)
31 October 2021; 14:00	1× (yellow card) 3× (suspension)	Report	2× (yellow card) 4× (suspension)	Helmut-Körnig-Halle, Dortmund; Attendance: 450; Referees: Christidi, Papamattheou (GRE)

31 October 2021; 14:00	Team Esbjerg (Denmark)	25–18	(Russia) Rostov-Don	Blue Water Dokken, Esbjerg; Attendance: 2,014; Referees: Simone, Monitillo (ITA)
31 October 2021; 14:00	Røsberg Jacobsen 8	(13–10)	Zaadi 5	Blue Water Dokken, Esbjerg; Attendance: 2,014; Referees: Simone, Monitillo (ITA)
31 October 2021; 14:00	2× (yellow card) 4× (suspension)	Report	3× (yellow card) 3× (suspension)	Blue Water Dokken, Esbjerg; Attendance: 2,014; Referees: Simone, Monitillo (ITA)

13 November 2021; 16:00	FTC-Rail Cargo Hungaria (Hungary)	31–30	(Romania) CSM București	Érd Aréna, Érd; Attendance: 2,200; Referees: Álvarez, Bustamante (ESP)
13 November 2021; 16:00	Grbić 6	(20–16)	Neagu 7	Érd Aréna, Érd; Attendance: 2,200; Referees: Álvarez, Bustamante (ESP)
13 November 2021; 16:00	1× (yellow card) 3× (suspension)	Report	3× (suspension)	Érd Aréna, Érd; Attendance: 2,200; Referees: Álvarez, Bustamante (ESP)

13 November 2021; 18:00	Brest Bretagne Handball (France)	25–21	(Montenegro) Budućnost BEMAX	Brest Arena, Brest; Attendance: 3,552; Referees: Hatipoğlu, Şimşek (TUR)
13 November 2021; 18:00	Toublanc 10	(12–12)	Kepic 5	Brest Arena, Brest; Attendance: 3,552; Referees: Hatipoğlu, Şimşek (TUR)
13 November 2021; 18:00	1× (yellow card) 4× (suspension)	Report	1× (yellow card) 5× (suspension)	Brest Arena, Brest; Attendance: 3,552; Referees: Hatipoğlu, Şimşek (TUR)

13 November 2021; 18:00	HC Podravka Vegeta (Croatia)	22–23	(Russia) Rostov-Don	ŠSD "Josip Samaržija-Bepo", Koprivnica; Attendance: 250; Referees: Erdoğan, Özdeniz (TUR)
13 November 2021; 18:00	Bazaliu 7	(13–13)	Managarova, Zaadi 5	ŠSD "Josip Samaržija-Bepo", Koprivnica; Attendance: 250; Referees: Erdoğan, Özdeniz (TUR)
13 November 2021; 18:00	4× (yellow card) 4× (suspension)	Report	2× (yellow card) 1× (suspension)	ŠSD "Josip Samaržija-Bepo", Koprivnica; Attendance: 250; Referees: Erdoğan, Özdeniz (TUR)

14 November 2021; 14:00	BV Borussia 09 Dortmund (Germany)	29–32	(Denmark) Team Esbjerg	Helmut-Körnig-Halle, Dortmund; Attendance: 650; Referees: Sekulić, Jovandić (SRB)
14 November 2021; 14:00	Grijseels 8	(14–20)	Breistøl, Ingstad 8	Helmut-Körnig-Halle, Dortmund; Attendance: 650; Referees: Sekulić, Jovandić (SRB)
14 November 2021; 14:00	1× (yellow card) 2× (suspension)	Report	1× (yellow card) 4× (suspension)	Helmut-Körnig-Halle, Dortmund; Attendance: 650; Referees: Sekulić, Jovandić (SRB)

20 November 2021; 16:00	CSM București (Romania)	27–21	(Hungary) FTC-Rail Cargo Hungaria	Polyvalent Hall, Bucharest; Attendance: 0 Referees: Gasmi, Gasmi (FRA)
20 November 2021; 16:00	Neagu 9	(16–11)	Bölk 9	Polyvalent Hall, Bucharest; Attendance: 0 Referees: Gasmi, Gasmi (FRA)
20 November 2021; 16:00	1× (yellow card) 2× (suspension)	Report	2× (yellow card) 2× (suspension)	Polyvalent Hall, Bucharest; Attendance: 0 Referees: Gasmi, Gasmi (FRA)

20 November 2021; 16:00	Rostov-Don (Russia)	34–23	(Croatia) HC Podravka Vegeta	Rostov-on-Don Palace of Sports, Rostov-on-Don; Attendance: 500; Referees: Metalari, Nikolovski (MKD)
20 November 2021; 16:00	Zaadi 8	(18–12)	Bazaliu, Kalaus 6	Rostov-on-Don Palace of Sports, Rostov-on-Don; Attendance: 500; Referees: Metalari, Nikolovski (MKD)
20 November 2021; 16:00	1× (yellow card) 2× (suspension)	Report	2× (yellow card) 3× (suspension)	Rostov-on-Don Palace of Sports, Rostov-on-Don; Attendance: 500; Referees: Metalari, Nikolovski (MKD)

20 November 2021; 18:00	Budućnost BEMAX (Montenegro)	30–28	(France) Brest Bretagne Handball	Morača Sports Center, Podgorica; Attendance: 500; Referees: Covalciuc, Covalciuc (MDA)
20 November 2021; 18:00	Pletikosić 12	(13–16)	Gigstad Fauske 9	Morača Sports Center, Podgorica; Attendance: 500; Referees: Covalciuc, Covalciuc (MDA)
20 November 2021; 18:00	2× (yellow card) 3× (suspension)	Report	1× (yellow card) 3× (suspension)	Morača Sports Center, Podgorica; Attendance: 500; Referees: Covalciuc, Covalciuc (MDA)

21 November 2021; 16:00	Team Esbjerg (Denmark)	34–24	(Germany) BV Borussia 09 Dortmund	Blue Water Dokken, Esbjerg; Attendance: 2,031; Referees: Bolic, Hurich (AUT)
21 November 2021; 16:00	Breistøl, Røsberg Jacobsen 7	(18–13)	Sando 7	Blue Water Dokken, Esbjerg; Attendance: 2,031; Referees: Bolic, Hurich (AUT)
21 November 2021; 16:00		Report	2× (suspension)	Blue Water Dokken, Esbjerg; Attendance: 2,031; Referees: Bolic, Hurich (AUT)

8 January 2022; 16:00	FTC-Rail Cargo Hungaria (Hungary)	26–22	(Montenegro) Budućnost BEMAX	Érd Aréna, Érd; Attendance: 2,000; Referees: Backović, Palačković (SLO)
8 January 2022; 16:00	Bölk 8	(18–11)	Bulatović 6	Érd Aréna, Érd; Attendance: 2,000; Referees: Backović, Palačković (SLO)
8 January 2022; 16:00	1× (yellow card) 3× (suspension)	Report	2× (yellow card) 5× (suspension)	Érd Aréna, Érd; Attendance: 2,000; Referees: Backović, Palačković (SLO)

8 January 2022; 16:00	Rostov-Don (Russia)	25–27	(Denmark) Team Esbjerg	Rostov-on-Don Palace of Sports, Rostov-on-Don; Attendance: 497; Referees: Jović, Arnautović (BIH)
8 January 2022; 16:00	Zaadi 6	(15–12)	Frafjord 6	Rostov-on-Don Palace of Sports, Rostov-on-Don; Attendance: 497; Referees: Jović, Arnautović (BIH)
8 January 2022; 16:00	1× (yellow card) 1× (suspension)	Report	1× (yellow card) 2× (suspension)	Rostov-on-Don Palace of Sports, Rostov-on-Don; Attendance: 497; Referees: Jović, Arnautović (BIH)

9 January 2022; 14:00	HC Podravka Vegeta (Croatia)	24–32	(Germany) BV Borussia 09 Dortmund	ŠSD "Josip Samaržija-Bepo", Koprivnica; Attendance: 400; Referees: Hatipoğlu, Şimşek (TUR)
9 January 2022; 14:00	Milosavljević 7	(10–17)	Freriks 6	ŠSD "Josip Samaržija-Bepo", Koprivnica; Attendance: 400; Referees: Hatipoğlu, Şimşek (TUR)
9 January 2022; 14:00	2× (yellow card) 7× (suspension)	Report	1× (yellow card) 3× (suspension)	ŠSD "Josip Samaržija-Bepo", Koprivnica; Attendance: 400; Referees: Hatipoğlu, Şimşek (TUR)

15 January 2022; 18:00	Budućnost BEMAX (Montenegro)	20–28	(Romania) CSM București	Morača Sports Center, Podgorica; Attendance: 0 Referees: Mitrevski, Todorovski (MKD)
15 January 2022; 18:00	Pavićević 7	(9–15)	Neagu 7	Morača Sports Center, Podgorica; Attendance: 0 Referees: Mitrevski, Todorovski (MKD)
15 January 2022; 18:00	2× (yellow card) 4× (suspension)	Report	1× (yellow card) 3× (suspension)	Morača Sports Center, Podgorica; Attendance: 0 Referees: Mitrevski, Todorovski (MKD)

15 January 2022; 18:00	BV Borussia 09 Dortmund (Germany)	25–31	(Russia) Rostov-Don	Helmut-Körnig-Halle, Dortmund; Attendance: 400; Referees: Lidacka, Lesiak (POL)
15 January 2022; 18:00	Kücükyildiz 7	(12–17)	Managarova, Zaadi 8	Helmut-Körnig-Halle, Dortmund; Attendance: 400; Referees: Lidacka, Lesiak (POL)
15 January 2022; 18:00	4× (suspension) 1× (red card)	Report	1× (yellow card) 3× (suspension)	Helmut-Körnig-Halle, Dortmund; Attendance: 400; Referees: Lidacka, Lesiak (POL)

19 January 2022 (Note: The match, originally scheduled for 8 January 2022, was postponed because of positive COVID-19 tests by players of CSM Bucureșt.); 20:45	Brest Bretagne Handball (France)	24–21	(Romania) CSM București	Brest Arena, Brest; Attendance: 2,000; Referees: Duplii, Pobedrina (UKR)
19 January 2022; 20:45	Coatanea 5	(11–11)	Neagu 7	Brest Arena, Brest; Attendance: 2,000; Referees: Duplii, Pobedrina (UKR)
19 January 2022; 20:45	1× (yellow card) 2× (suspension)	Report	1× (yellow card) 5× (suspension)	Brest Arena, Brest; Attendance: 2,000; Referees: Duplii, Pobedrina (UKR)

22 January 2022; 16:00	CSM București (Romania)	33–29	(Germany) BV Borussia 09 Dortmund	Polyvalent Hall, Bucharest; Attendance: 1,800; Referees: Sá, Sá (POR)
22 January 2022; 16:00	Neagu 11	(16–14)	Berger 6	Polyvalent Hall, Bucharest; Attendance: 1,800; Referees: Sá, Sá (POR)
22 January 2022; 16:00	1× (yellow card) 4× (suspension)	Report	1× (yellow card) 4× (suspension)	Polyvalent Hall, Bucharest; Attendance: 1,800; Referees: Sá, Sá (POR)

22 January 2022; 16:00	Rostov-Don (Russia)	30–20	(Montenegro) Budućnost BEMAX	Rostov-on-Don Palace of Sports, Rostov-on-Don; Attendance: 500; Referees: Nabokau, Kulik (BLR)
22 January 2022; 16:00	Bobrovnikova, Kozhokar 5	(12–9)	Vukčević 5	Rostov-on-Don Palace of Sports, Rostov-on-Don; Attendance: 500; Referees: Nabokau, Kulik (BLR)
22 January 2022; 16:00	1× (yellow card) 5× (suspension)	Report	1× (yellow card) 6× (suspension)	Rostov-on-Don Palace of Sports, Rostov-on-Don; Attendance: 500; Referees: Nabokau, Kulik (BLR)

23 January 2022; 14:00	Team Esbjerg (Denmark)	33–27	(Hungary) FTC-Rail Cargo Hungaria	Blue Water Dokken, Esbjerg; Attendance: 1,260; Referees: Braseth, Sundet (NOR)
23 January 2022; 14:00	Reistad 13	(14–13)	Kisfaludy, Malestein 6	Blue Water Dokken, Esbjerg; Attendance: 1,260; Referees: Braseth, Sundet (NOR)
23 January 2022; 14:00	1× (yellow card) 2× (suspension)	Report	2× (yellow card) 5× (suspension)	Blue Water Dokken, Esbjerg; Attendance: 1,260; Referees: Braseth, Sundet (NOR)

23 January 2022; 14:00	HC Podravka Vegeta (Croatia)	28–39	(France) Brest Bretagne Handball	ŠSD "Josip Samaržija-Bepo", Koprivnica; Attendance: 200; Referees: Tzaferopoulos, Bethmann (GRE)
23 January 2022; 14:00	Milosavljević 7	(16–17)	Gigstad Fauske 11	ŠSD "Josip Samaržija-Bepo", Koprivnica; Attendance: 200; Referees: Tzaferopoulos, Bethmann (GRE)
23 January 2022; 14:00	5× (suspension)	Report	1× (yellow card) 3× (suspension)	ŠSD "Josip Samaržija-Bepo", Koprivnica; Attendance: 200; Referees: Tzaferopoulos, Bethmann (GRE)

29 January 2022 (Note: The match, originally scheduled for 16 January 2022, was postponed.); 16:00	Team Esbjerg (Denmark)	30–17	(Croatia) HC Podravka Vegeta	Blue Water Dokken, Esbjerg; Attendance: 1,180; Referees: Kijauskaitė, Žalienė (LTU)
29 January 2022; 16:00	Solberg-Isaksen 7	(18–7)	Stelmakh 5	Blue Water Dokken, Esbjerg; Attendance: 1,180; Referees: Kijauskaitė, Žalienė (LTU)
29 January 2022; 16:00	3× (suspension)	Report	2× (yellow card) 5× (suspension)	Blue Water Dokken, Esbjerg; Attendance: 1,180; Referees: Kijauskaitė, Žalienė (LTU)

29 January 2022; 20:00	Brest Bretagne Handball (France)	30–25	(Hungary) FTC-Rail Cargo Hungaria	Brest Arena, Brest; Attendance: 2,000; Referees: Erdoğan, Özdeniz (TUR)
29 January 2022; 20:00	Gigstad Fauske 13	(19–16)	Malestein 10	Brest Arena, Brest; Attendance: 2,000; Referees: Erdoğan, Özdeniz (TUR)
29 January 2022; 20:00	2× (yellow card) 3× (suspension)	Report	2× (yellow card) 4× (suspension) 1× (red card)	Brest Arena, Brest; Attendance: 2,000; Referees: Erdoğan, Özdeniz (TUR)

5 February 2022; 16:00	Brest Bretagne Handball (France)	31–25	(Germany) BV Borussia 09 Dortmund	Brest Arena, Brest; Attendance: 3,455; Referees: Yovchev, Yonchev (BUL)
5 February 2022; 16:00	Toublanc 6	(17–10)	Rønning, Van Zijl 5	Brest Arena, Brest; Attendance: 3,455; Referees: Yovchev, Yonchev (BUL)
5 February 2022; 16:00	1× (yellow card) 1× (suspension)	Report	1× (yellow card) 5× (suspension)	Brest Arena, Brest; Attendance: 3,455; Referees: Yovchev, Yonchev (BUL)

5 February 2022; 16:00	FTC-Rail Cargo Hungaria (Hungary)	25–25	(Russia) Rostov-Don	Érd Aréna, Érd; Attendance: 1,800; Referees: Christidi, Papamattheou (GRE)
5 February 2022; 16:00	Szöllősi-Zácsik 7	(13–13)	Managarova 7	Érd Aréna, Érd; Attendance: 1,800; Referees: Christidi, Papamattheou (GRE)
5 February 2022; 16:00	1× (yellow card) 3× (suspension)	Report	2× (suspension)	Érd Aréna, Érd; Attendance: 1,800; Referees: Christidi, Papamattheou (GRE)

5 February 2022; 18:00	Budućnost BEMAX (Montenegro)	25–36	(Denmark) Team Esbjerg	Morača Sports Center, Podgorica; Attendance: 500; Referees: Praštalo, Balvan (BIH)
5 February 2022; 18:00	Pavićević, Pletikosić 6	(13–14)	Kamp 8	Morača Sports Center, Podgorica; Attendance: 500; Referees: Praštalo, Balvan (BIH)
5 February 2022; 18:00	2× (yellow card) 3× (suspension)	Report	2× (suspension)	Morača Sports Center, Podgorica; Attendance: 500; Referees: Praštalo, Balvan (BIH)

6 February 2022; 16:00	CSM București (Romania)	29–21	(Croatia) HC Podravka Vegeta	Polyvalent Hall, Bucharest; Attendance: 1,350; Referees: Ilieva, Karbeska (MKD)
6 February 2022; 16:00	Arntzen, Omoregie 5	(19–10)	Mugoša 7	Polyvalent Hall, Bucharest; Attendance: 1,350; Referees: Ilieva, Karbeska (MKD)
6 February 2022; 16:00	2× (yellow card) 3× (suspension)	Report	1× (yellow card) 2× (suspension)	Polyvalent Hall, Bucharest; Attendance: 1,350; Referees: Ilieva, Karbeska (MKD)

13 February 2022; 16:00	BV Borussia 09 Dortmund (Germany)	30–34	(Montenegro) Budućnost BEMAX	Helmut-Körnig-Halle, Dortmund; Attendance: 500; Referees: Vranes, Wenninger (AUT)
13 February 2022; 16:00	Van der Heijden 8	(18–16)	Maslova 10	Helmut-Körnig-Halle, Dortmund; Attendance: 500; Referees: Vranes, Wenninger (AUT)
13 February 2022; 16:00	2× (suspension)	Report	1× (yellow card) 6× (suspension)	Helmut-Körnig-Halle, Dortmund; Attendance: 500; Referees: Vranes, Wenninger (AUT)

13 February 2022; 16:00	Team Esbjerg (Denmark)	28–28	(France) Brest Bretagne Handball	Blue Water Dokken, Esbjerg; Attendance: 2,135; Referees: Backović, Palačković (SLO)
13 February 2022; 16:00	Breistøl 8	(15–16)	Toublanc 7	Blue Water Dokken, Esbjerg; Attendance: 2,135; Referees: Backović, Palačković (SLO)
13 February 2022; 16:00	4× (suspension)	Report	3× (yellow card) 6× (suspension)	Blue Water Dokken, Esbjerg; Attendance: 2,135; Referees: Backović, Palačković (SLO)

16 February 2022 (Note: The match, originally scheduled for 12 February 2022, was postponed due to several positive COVID-19 tests by HC Podravka Vegeta.); 17:00	HC Podravka Vegeta (Croatia)	29–33	(Hungary) FTC-Rail Cargo Hungaria	ŠSD "Josip Samaržija-Bepo", Koprivnica; Attendance: 200; Referees: Sekulić, Jovandić (SRB)
16 February 2022; 17:00	Milosavljević 11	(16–15)	Szöllősi-Zácsik 7	ŠSD "Josip Samaržija-Bepo", Koprivnica; Attendance: 200; Referees: Sekulić, Jovandić (SRB)
16 February 2022; 17:00	2× (yellow card) 3× (suspension)	Report	1× (yellow card) 5× (suspension)	ŠSD "Josip Samaržija-Bepo", Koprivnica; Attendance: 200; Referees: Sekulić, Jovandić (SRB)

19 February 2022; 16:00	FTC-Rail Cargo Hungaria (Hungary)	23–21	(Germany) BV Borussia 09 Dortmund	Érd Aréna, Érd; Attendance: 2,000; Referees: Duplii, Pobedrina (UKR)
19 February 2022; 16:00	Stolle, Szöllősi-Zácsik 4	(12–11)	Van der Heijden 4	Érd Aréna, Érd; Attendance: 2,000; Referees: Duplii, Pobedrina (UKR)
19 February 2022; 16:00	2× (yellow card) 5× (suspension)	Report	1× (yellow card) 2× (suspension)	Érd Aréna, Érd; Attendance: 2,000; Referees: Duplii, Pobedrina (UKR)

19 February 2022; 18:00	Brest Bretagne Handball (France)	18–29	(Russia) Rostov-Don	Brest Arena, Brest; Attendance: 4,101; Referees: Merz, Kuttler (GER)
19 February 2022; 18:00	Toublanc 6	(9–17)	Zaadi 9	Brest Arena, Brest; Attendance: 4,101; Referees: Merz, Kuttler (GER)
19 February 2022; 18:00	3× (yellow card) 4× (suspension)	Report	2× (yellow card) 3× (suspension)	Brest Arena, Brest; Attendance: 4,101; Referees: Merz, Kuttler (GER)

19 February 2022; 18:00	Budućnost BEMAX (Montenegro)	27–21	(Croatia) HC Podravka Vegeta	Bemax Hall, Podgorica; Attendance: 600; Referees: Christidi, Papamattheou (GRE)
19 February 2022; 18:00	Pletikosić 12	(13–13)	Milosavljević 7	Bemax Hall, Podgorica; Attendance: 600; Referees: Christidi, Papamattheou (GRE)
19 February 2022; 18:00	2× (yellow card) 3× (suspension)	Report	2× (yellow card) 4× (suspension)	Bemax Hall, Podgorica; Attendance: 600; Referees: Christidi, Papamattheou (GRE)

20 February 2022; 14:00	CSM București (Romania)	29–29	(Denmark) Team Esbjerg	Polyvalent Hall, Bucharest; Attendance: 1,250; Referees: Antić, Jakovljević (SRB)
20 February 2022; 14:00	Neagu 10	(15–16)	Reistad 9	Polyvalent Hall, Bucharest; Attendance: 1,250; Referees: Antić, Jakovljević (SRB)
20 February 2022; 14:00	1× (yellow card) 2× (suspension)	Report	1× (yellow card) 3× (suspension)	Polyvalent Hall, Bucharest; Attendance: 1,250; Referees: Antić, Jakovljević (SRB)

Cancelled (Note: The match, originally scheduled for 12 February 2022, was cancelled due to several positive COVID-19 tests by CSM București.)	Rostov-Don (Russia)	10–0 (Note: The match could not be played and was assessed by the EHF.)	(Romania) CSM București

=== Group B ===
Pos	Team	Pld	W	D	L	GF	GA	GD	Pts	Qualification
1	(Hungary) Győri Audi ETO KC	14	13	0	1	471	354	+117	26	Quarterfinals
2	(Norway) Vipers Kristiansand	14	10	0	4	435	370	+65	20	Quarterfinals
3	(France) Metz Handball	14	9	1	4	413	375	+38	19	Playoffs
4	(Russia) CSKA Moscow	14	7	2	5	375	372	+3	16	Playoffs
5	(Denmark) Odense Håndbold	14	7	1	6	405	386	+19	15	Playoffs
6	(Slovenia) RK Krim Mercator	14	4	2	8	362	381	−19	10	Playoffs
7	(Sweden) IK Sävehof	14	3	0	11	351	461	−110	6	
8	(Turkey) Kastamonu Bld. GSK	14	0	0	14	349	462	−113	0	

Source: EHF
Rules for classification: Tiebreakers

11 September 2021; 18:00	Győri Audi ETO KC (Hungary)	35–29	(Norway) Vipers Kristiansand	Audi Aréna, Győr; Attendance: 3,862; Referees: Gasmi, Gasmi (FRA)
11 September 2021; 18:00	Lukács 7	(17–13)	Valle Dahl 12	Audi Aréna, Győr; Attendance: 3,862; Referees: Gasmi, Gasmi (FRA)
11 September 2021; 18:00	3× (suspension)	Report	5× (suspension)	Audi Aréna, Győr; Attendance: 3,862; Referees: Gasmi, Gasmi (FRA)

12 September 2021; 14:00	IK Sävehof (Sweden)	29–28	(Slovenia) RK Krim Mercator	Partille Arena, Partille; Attendance: 600; Referees: Sá, Sá (POR)
12 September 2021; 14:00	Roberts 10	(11–13)	Stanko 7	Partille Arena, Partille; Attendance: 600; Referees: Sá, Sá (POR)
12 September 2021; 14:00	3× (yellow card) 6× (suspension)	Report	6× (suspension)	Partille Arena, Partille; Attendance: 600; Referees: Sá, Sá (POR)

12 September 2021; 16:00	Kastamonu Bld. GSK (Turkey)	25–31	(Denmark) Odense Håndbold	Kastamonu Atatürk Sport Hall, Kastamonu; Attendance: 1,200; Referees: Vujačić, Kažanegra (MNE)
12 September 2021; 16:00	Radičević 9	(11–15)	Housheer, Højlund 7	Kastamonu Atatürk Sport Hall, Kastamonu; Attendance: 1,200; Referees: Vujačić, Kažanegra (MNE)
12 September 2021; 16:00	1× (yellow card) 3× (suspension)	Report	3× (suspension)	Kastamonu Atatürk Sport Hall, Kastamonu; Attendance: 1,200; Referees: Vujačić, Kažanegra (MNE)

18 September 2021; 16:00	Odense Håndbold (Denmark)	21–27	(France) Metz Handball	Sydbank Arena Odense, Odense; Attendance: 1,647; Referees: Lončar, Lončar (CRO)
18 September 2021; 16:00	Housheer 9	(13–15)	Nocandy 7	Sydbank Arena Odense, Odense; Attendance: 1,647; Referees: Lončar, Lončar (CRO)
18 September 2021; 16:00	3× (suspension)	Report	1× (yellow card) 3× (suspension)	Sydbank Arena Odense, Odense; Attendance: 1,647; Referees: Lončar, Lončar (CRO)

18 September 2021; 18:00	RK Krim Mercator (Slovenia)	26–31	(Hungary) Győri Audi ETO KC	Arena Stožice, Ljubljana; Attendance: 542; Referees: Jurinović, Mrvica (CRO)
18 September 2021; 18:00	Sercien-Ugolin 5	(12–13)	Kristiansen, Ryu 7	Arena Stožice, Ljubljana; Attendance: 542; Referees: Jurinović, Mrvica (CRO)
18 September 2021; 18:00	2× (yellow card) 1× (suspension)	Report	2× (yellow card) 1× (suspension)	Arena Stožice, Ljubljana; Attendance: 542; Referees: Jurinović, Mrvica (CRO)

18 September 2021; 18:00	Vipers Kristiansand (Norway)	34–25	(Sweden) IK Sävehof	Aquarama Kristiansand, Kristiansand; Attendance: 850; Referees: Geraets, Geraets (NED)
18 September 2021; 18:00	Mørk 12	(15–11)	Roberts 5	Aquarama Kristiansand, Kristiansand; Attendance: 850; Referees: Geraets, Geraets (NED)
18 September 2021; 18:00	1× (yellow card) 4× (suspension)	Report	1× (yellow card) 2× (suspension)	Aquarama Kristiansand, Kristiansand; Attendance: 850; Referees: Geraets, Geraets (NED)

19 September 2021; 14:00	CSKA Moscow (Russia)	34–27	(Turkey) Kastamonu Bld. GSK	Dynamo Sports Palace, Moscow; Attendance: 415; Referees: Jovandić, Sekulić (SRB)
19 September 2021; 14:00	Gros 10	(16–15)	Radičević 8	Dynamo Sports Palace, Moscow; Attendance: 415; Referees: Jovandić, Sekulić (SRB)
19 September 2021; 14:00	1× (yellow card) 2× (suspension)	Report	4× (suspension)	Dynamo Sports Palace, Moscow; Attendance: 415; Referees: Jovandić, Sekulić (SRB)

25 September 2021; 16:00	Kastamonu Bld. GSK (Turkey)	23–24	(Slovenia) RK Krim Mercator	Merkez Spor Salonu, Kastamonu; Attendance: 350; Referees: Năstase, Stancu (ROU)
25 September 2021; 16:00	Kovářová, Radičević 5	(9–12)	Krpež Šlezak 9	Merkez Spor Salonu, Kastamonu; Attendance: 350; Referees: Năstase, Stancu (ROU)
25 September 2021; 16:00	1× (yellow card) 5× (suspension)	Report	1× (yellow card) 2× (suspension)	Merkez Spor Salonu, Kastamonu; Attendance: 350; Referees: Năstase, Stancu (ROU)

26 September 2021; 16:00	Győri Audi ETO KC (Hungary)	32–22	(Russia) CSKA Moscow	Audi Aréna, Győr; Attendance: 4,071; Referees: Álvarez, Bustamante (ESP)
26 September 2021; 16:00	Oftedal 5	(17–15)	Gros, Sabirova 6	Audi Aréna, Győr; Attendance: 4,071; Referees: Álvarez, Bustamante (ESP)
26 September 2021; 16:00	4× (suspension) 1× (red card)	Report	2× (yellow card) 3× (suspension)	Audi Aréna, Győr; Attendance: 4,071; Referees: Álvarez, Bustamante (ESP)

26 September 2021; 16:00	Metz Handball (France)	23–18	(Norway) Vipers Kristiansand	Palais des Sports Jean Weille, Nancy; Attendance: 2,765; Referees: Simone, Monitillo (ITA)
26 September 2021; 16:00	Nocandy 5	(14–9)	Mørk 5	Palais des Sports Jean Weille, Nancy; Attendance: 2,765; Referees: Simone, Monitillo (ITA)
26 September 2021; 16:00	5× (suspension)	Report	1× (yellow card) 5× (suspension)	Palais des Sports Jean Weille, Nancy; Attendance: 2,765; Referees: Simone, Monitillo (ITA)

26 September 2021; 16:00	IK Sävehof (Sweden)	31–37	(Denmark) Odense Håndbold	Partille Arena, Partille; Attendance: 600; Referees: Merz, Kuttler (GER)
26 September 2021; 16:00	Roberts 10	(16–19)	Rej 8	Partille Arena, Partille; Attendance: 600; Referees: Merz, Kuttler (GER)
26 September 2021; 16:00	2× (yellow card) 4× (suspension)	Report	1× (yellow card) 1× (suspension)	Partille Arena, Partille; Attendance: 600; Referees: Merz, Kuttler (GER)

16 October 2021; 18:00	Vipers Kristiansand (Norway)	39–25	(Turkey) Kastamonu Bld. GSK	Aquarama Kristiansand, Kristiansand; Attendance: 1,350; Referees: Kijauskaitė, Žalienė (LTU)
16 October 2021; 18:00	Mørk 8	(20–11)	Akgün 6	Aquarama Kristiansand, Kristiansand; Attendance: 1,350; Referees: Kijauskaitė, Žalienė (LTU)
16 October 2021; 18:00	1× (yellow card) 4× (suspension)	Report	1× (yellow card) 6× (suspension) 2× (red card)	Aquarama Kristiansand, Kristiansand; Attendance: 1,350; Referees: Kijauskaitė, Žalienė (LTU)

17 October 2021; 14:00	CSKA Moscow (Russia)	29–28	(Sweden) IK Sävehof	Dynamo Sports Palace, Moscow; Attendance: 550; Referees: Butskevich, Butskevich (BLR)
17 October 2021; 14:00	Ilyina, Sabirova 6	(14–11)	Roberts 8	Dynamo Sports Palace, Moscow; Attendance: 550; Referees: Butskevich, Butskevich (BLR)
17 October 2021; 14:00	1× (yellow card) 2× (suspension)	Report	1× (yellow card) 5× (suspension)	Dynamo Sports Palace, Moscow; Attendance: 550; Referees: Butskevich, Butskevich (BLR)

17 October 2021; 16:00	RK Krim Mercator (Slovenia)	28–29	(France) Metz Handball	Arena Stožice, Ljubljana; Attendance: 1,000; Referees: Alpaidze, Berezkina (RUS)
17 October 2021; 16:00	Pineau 7	(17–15)	Nocandy 8	Arena Stožice, Ljubljana; Attendance: 1,000; Referees: Alpaidze, Berezkina (RUS)
17 October 2021; 16:00	1× (yellow card) 5× (suspension)	Report	1× (yellow card) 6× (suspension)	Arena Stožice, Ljubljana; Attendance: 1,000; Referees: Alpaidze, Berezkina (RUS)

17 October 2021; 16:00	Odense Håndbold (Denmark)	26–31	(Hungary) Győri Audi ETO KC	Phønix Tag Arena, Gudme; Attendance: 1,556; Referees: Carmaux, Mursch (FRA)
17 October 2021; 16:00	Housheer 7	(11–16)	Ryu, Schatzl 6	Phønix Tag Arena, Gudme; Attendance: 1,556; Referees: Carmaux, Mursch (FRA)
17 October 2021; 16:00	1× (yellow card) 4× (suspension)	Report	1× (yellow card) 6× (suspension)	Phønix Tag Arena, Gudme; Attendance: 1,556; Referees: Carmaux, Mursch (FRA)

23 October 2021; 18:00	Vipers Kristiansand (Norway)	24–27	(Russia) CSKA Moscow	Aquarama Kristiansand, Kristiansand; Attendance: 1,329; Referees: Sá, Sá (POR)
23 October 2021; 18:00	Mørk 9	(11–11)	Mikhaylichenko 10	Aquarama Kristiansand, Kristiansand; Attendance: 1,329; Referees: Sá, Sá (POR)
23 October 2021; 18:00	2× (yellow card) 4× (suspension) 1× (red card)	Report	2× (yellow card) 3× (suspension) 1× (red card)	Aquarama Kristiansand, Kristiansand; Attendance: 1,329; Referees: Sá, Sá (POR)

23 October 2021; 18:00	Metz Handball (France)	29–33	(Hungary) Győri Audi ETO KC	Arènes de Metz, Metz; Attendance: 4,051; Referees: Năstase, Stancu (ROU)
23 October 2021; 18:00	De Paula 7	(15–16)	Schatzl 5	Arènes de Metz, Metz; Attendance: 4,051; Referees: Năstase, Stancu (ROU)
23 October 2021; 18:00	2× (yellow card) 2× (suspension)	Report	1× (yellow card) 1× (suspension)	Arènes de Metz, Metz; Attendance: 4,051; Referees: Năstase, Stancu (ROU)

24 October 2021; 16:00	Odense Håndbold (Denmark)	26–24	(Slovenia) RK Krim Mercator	Phønix Tag Arena, Gudme; Attendance: 1,217; Referees: Sekulić, Jovandić (SRB)
24 October 2021; 16:00	Van Wetering 5	(13–10)	Stanko 7	Phønix Tag Arena, Gudme; Attendance: 1,217; Referees: Sekulić, Jovandić (SRB)
24 October 2021; 16:00	1× (yellow card) 3× (suspension)	Report	4× (suspension)	Phønix Tag Arena, Gudme; Attendance: 1,217; Referees: Sekulić, Jovandić (SRB)

24 October 2021; 16:00	IK Sävehof (Sweden)	28–26	(Turkey) Kastamonu Bld. GSK	Partille Arena, Partille; Attendance: 850; Referees: Lončar, Lončar (CRO)
24 October 2021; 16:00	Mortensen 6	(11–17)	Demirçelen, Kovářová 5	Partille Arena, Partille; Attendance: 850; Referees: Lončar, Lončar (CRO)
24 October 2021; 16:00	1× (yellow card) 3× (suspension)	Report	1× (yellow card) 1× (suspension)	Partille Arena, Partille; Attendance: 850; Referees: Lončar, Lončar (CRO)

30 October 2021; 16:00	Győri Audi ETO KC (Hungary)	41–19	(Sweden) IK Sävehof	Audi Aréna, Győr; Attendance: 3,945; Referees: Jović, Arnautović (BIH)
30 October 2021; 16:00	Blohm 7	(20–9)	Roberts 5	Audi Aréna, Győr; Attendance: 3,945; Referees: Jović, Arnautović (BIH)
30 October 2021; 16:00	1× (yellow card)	Report	2× (suspension)	Audi Aréna, Győr; Attendance: 3,945; Referees: Jović, Arnautović (BIH)

30 October 2021; 18:00	RK Krim Mercator (Slovenia)	26–27	(Norway) Vipers Kristiansand	Arena Stožice, Ljubljana; Attendance: 500; Referees: Barysas, Petrušis (LTU)
30 October 2021; 18:00	Stanko 6	(16–10)	Mørk 11	Arena Stožice, Ljubljana; Attendance: 500; Referees: Barysas, Petrušis (LTU)
30 October 2021; 18:00	1× (yellow card) 5× (suspension)	Report	1× (yellow card) 3× (suspension)	Arena Stožice, Ljubljana; Attendance: 500; Referees: Barysas, Petrušis (LTU)

31 October 2021; 16:00	CSKA Moscow (Russia)	21–28	(Denmark) Odense Håndbold	Dynamo Sports Palace, Moscow; Attendance: 0 Referees: Andorka, Hucker (HUN)
31 October 2021; 16:00	Skorobogatchenko 5	(13–14)	Rej 8	Dynamo Sports Palace, Moscow; Attendance: 0 Referees: Andorka, Hucker (HUN)
31 October 2021; 16:00	1× (yellow card) 3× (suspension)	Report	1× (yellow card) 4× (suspension)	Dynamo Sports Palace, Moscow; Attendance: 0 Referees: Andorka, Hucker (HUN)

31 October 2021; 16:00	Kastamonu Bld. GSK (Turkey)	20–30	(France) Metz Handball	Kastamonu Atatürk Sport Hall, Kastamonu; Attendance: 1,000; Referees: Antić, Jakovljević (SRB)
31 October 2021; 16:00	Radičević 5	(9–13)	N'Gouan 6	Kastamonu Atatürk Sport Hall, Kastamonu; Attendance: 1,000; Referees: Antić, Jakovljević (SRB)
31 October 2021; 16:00	1× (yellow card) 4× (suspension)	Report	2× (yellow card) 3× (suspension)	Kastamonu Atatürk Sport Hall, Kastamonu; Attendance: 1,000; Referees: Antić, Jakovljević (SRB)

13 November 2021; 18:00	Győri Audi ETO KC (Hungary)	37–20	(Turkey) Kastamonu Bld. GSK	Audi Aréna, Győr; Attendance: 3,100; Referees: Duplii, Pobedrina (UKR)
13 November 2021; 18:00	Nze Minko 6	(19–9)	Radičević 11	Audi Aréna, Győr; Attendance: 3,100; Referees: Duplii, Pobedrina (UKR)
13 November 2021; 18:00	1× (yellow card) 2× (suspension)	Report	1× (yellow card) 3× (suspension)	Audi Aréna, Győr; Attendance: 3,100; Referees: Duplii, Pobedrina (UKR)

14 November 2021; 14:00	CSKA Moscow (Russia)	21–21	(Slovenia) RK Krim Mercator	Dynamo Sports Palace, Moscow; Attendance: 370; Referees: Konjičanin, Konjičanin (BIH)
14 November 2021; 14:00	Ristovska 5	(11–12)	Stanko 7	Dynamo Sports Palace, Moscow; Attendance: 370; Referees: Konjičanin, Konjičanin (BIH)
14 November 2021; 14:00	1× (yellow card) 2× (suspension)	Report	2× (yellow card) 2× (suspension)	Dynamo Sports Palace, Moscow; Attendance: 370; Referees: Konjičanin, Konjičanin (BIH)

14 November 2021; 16:00	Odense Håndbold (Denmark)	27–32	(Norway) Vipers Kristiansand	Sydbank Arena Odense, Odense; Attendance: 2,117; Referees: Vešović, Mitrović (MNE)
14 November 2021; 16:00	Rej 7	(15–17)	Knedlíková, Mørk 8	Sydbank Arena Odense, Odense; Attendance: 2,117; Referees: Vešović, Mitrović (MNE)
14 November 2021; 16:00	2× (yellow card) 3× (suspension)	Report	2× (yellow card) 4× (suspension)	Sydbank Arena Odense, Odense; Attendance: 2,117; Referees: Vešović, Mitrović (MNE)

14 November 2021; 16:00	IK Sävehof (Sweden)	28–31	(France) Metz Handball	Partille Arena, Partille; Attendance: 1,522; Referees: Vranes, Wenninger (AUT)
14 November 2021; 16:00	Roberts 11	(12–15)	N'Gouan 8	Partille Arena, Partille; Attendance: 1,522; Referees: Vranes, Wenninger (AUT)
14 November 2021; 16:00	2× (yellow card) 4× (suspension) 1× (red card)	Report	3× (suspension)	Partille Arena, Partille; Attendance: 1,522; Referees: Vranes, Wenninger (AUT)

17 November 2021 (Note: The match, originally scheduled for 12 September 2021, was postponed because the CSKA Moscow team was not able to travel to France due to logistical difficulties.); 20:45	Metz Handball (France)	24–32	(Russia) CSKA Moscow	Palais des Sports Jean Weille, Nancy; Attendance: 2,754; Referees: Merz, Kuttler (GER)
17 November 2021; 20:45	Mičijević 5	(12–15)	Gros 12	Palais des Sports Jean Weille, Nancy; Attendance: 2,754; Referees: Merz, Kuttler (GER)
17 November 2021; 20:45	2× (yellow card) 1× (suspension)	Report	2× (yellow card) 2× (suspension)	Palais des Sports Jean Weille, Nancy; Attendance: 2,754; Referees: Merz, Kuttler (GER)

20 November 2021; 16:00	RK Krim Mercator (Slovenia)	24–21	(Russia) CSKA Moscow	Arena Stožice, Ljubljana; Attendance: 380; Referees: Lončar, Lončar (CRO)
20 November 2021; 16:00	Krpež Šlezak 7	(11–10)	Gros 7	Arena Stožice, Ljubljana; Attendance: 380; Referees: Lončar, Lončar (CRO)
20 November 2021; 16:00	3× (suspension) 1× (red card)	Report	2× (yellow card) 4× (suspension)	Arena Stožice, Ljubljana; Attendance: 380; Referees: Lončar, Lončar (CRO)

20 November 2021; 18:00	Vipers Kristiansand (Norway)	31–27	(Denmark) Odense Håndbold	Aquarama Kristiansand, Kristiansand; Attendance: 1,416; Referees: Năstase, Stancu (ROU)
20 November 2021; 18:00	Mørk 7	(17–16)	Housheer, Højlund 5	Aquarama Kristiansand, Kristiansand; Attendance: 1,416; Referees: Năstase, Stancu (ROU)
20 November 2021; 18:00	3× (suspension)	Report	1× (yellow card) 3× (suspension) 1× (red card)	Aquarama Kristiansand, Kristiansand; Attendance: 1,416; Referees: Năstase, Stancu (ROU)

20 November 2021; 18:00	Kastamonu Bld. GSK (Turkey)	22–38	(Hungary) Győri Audi ETO KC	Kastamonu Atatürk Sport Hall, Kastamonu; Attendance: 2,627; Referees: Ilieva, Karbeska (MKD)
20 November 2021; 18:00	Kovářová, Radičević 4	(9–19)	Pintea 6	Kastamonu Atatürk Sport Hall, Kastamonu; Attendance: 2,627; Referees: Ilieva, Karbeska (MKD)
20 November 2021; 18:00	2× (yellow card)	Report	2× (yellow card) 1× (suspension)	Kastamonu Atatürk Sport Hall, Kastamonu; Attendance: 2,627; Referees: Ilieva, Karbeska (MKD)

21 November 2021; 16:00	Metz Handball (France)	35–21	(Sweden) IK Sävehof	Arènes de Metz, Metz; Attendance: 2,723; Referees: Christiansen, Hansen (DEN)
21 November 2021; 16:00	Horacek, Nocandy 6	(19–15)	Blomst 7	Arènes de Metz, Metz; Attendance: 2,723; Referees: Christiansen, Hansen (DEN)
21 November 2021; 16:00	2× (yellow card) 4× (suspension)	Report	2× (yellow card) 3× (suspension) 1× (red card)	Arènes de Metz, Metz; Attendance: 2,723; Referees: Christiansen, Hansen (DEN)

9 January 2022; 16:00	Odense Håndbold (Denmark)	27–27	(Russia) CSKA Moscow	Sydbank Arena Odense, Odense; Attendance: 0 Referees: Budzák, Záhradník (SVK)
9 January 2022; 16:00	Aardahl 6	(12–12)	Gros 6	Sydbank Arena Odense, Odense; Attendance: 0 Referees: Budzák, Záhradník (SVK)
9 January 2022; 16:00	3× (suspension)	Report	2× (yellow card) 4× (suspension)	Sydbank Arena Odense, Odense; Attendance: 0 Referees: Budzák, Záhradník (SVK)

9 January 2022 (Note: The match, originally scheduled for 13 February 2022, was moved ahead due to postponed games.); 16:00	IK Sävehof (Sweden)	23–42	(Norway) Vipers Kristiansand	Partille Arena, Partille; Attendance: 1,620; Referees: Christidi, Papamattheou (GRE)
9 January 2022; 16:00	Rosell 7	(15–21)	Valle Dahl 8	Partille Arena, Partille; Attendance: 1,620; Referees: Christidi, Papamattheou (GRE)
9 January 2022; 16:00	3× (suspension)	Report	2× (suspension)	Partille Arena, Partille; Attendance: 1,620; Referees: Christidi, Papamattheou (GRE)

15 January 2022; 16:00	Győri Audi ETO KC (Hungary)	39–30	(France) Metz Handball	Audi Aréna, Győr; Referees: Metalari, Nikolovski (MKD)
15 January 2022; 16:00	Kristiansen 10	(20–13)	Horacek 8	Audi Aréna, Győr; Referees: Metalari, Nikolovski (MKD)
15 January 2022; 16:00	3× (suspension)	Report	5× (suspension)	Audi Aréna, Győr; Referees: Metalari, Nikolovski (MKD)

16 January 2022; 16:00	CSKA Moscow (Russia)	28–32	(Norway) Vipers Kristiansand	Dynamo Sports Palace, Moscow; Attendance: 900; Referees: Vujačić, Kažanegra (MNE)
16 January 2022; 16:00	Gros 9	(13–16)	Jeřábková 8	Dynamo Sports Palace, Moscow; Attendance: 900; Referees: Vujačić, Kažanegra (MNE)
16 January 2022; 16:00	1× (yellow card) 1× (suspension)	Report	2× (yellow card) 2× (suspension)	Dynamo Sports Palace, Moscow; Attendance: 900; Referees: Vujačić, Kažanegra (MNE)

16 January 2022; 16:00	RK Krim Mercator (Slovenia)	19–24	(Denmark) Odense Håndbold	Arena Stožice, Ljubljana; Attendance: 350; Referees: Antić, Jakovljević (SRB)
16 January 2022; 16:00	Klemenčič, Posavec 3	(5–15)	Van Wetering 4	Arena Stožice, Ljubljana; Attendance: 350; Referees: Antić, Jakovljević (SRB)
16 January 2022; 16:00	1× (yellow card) 3× (suspension)	Report	2× (yellow card) 2× (suspension)	Arena Stožice, Ljubljana; Attendance: 350; Referees: Antić, Jakovljević (SRB)

19 January 2022 (Note: The match, originally scheduled for 9 January 2022, was postponed.); 18:45	Metz Handball (France)	33–25	(Turkey) Kastamonu Bld. GSK	Arènes de Metz, Metz; Attendance: 1,752; Referees: Martins, Martins (POR)
19 January 2022; 18:45	Horacek 6	(17–10)	Radičević 8	Arènes de Metz, Metz; Attendance: 1,752; Referees: Martins, Martins (POR)
19 January 2022; 18:45	4× (suspension)	Report	5× (suspension)	Arènes de Metz, Metz; Attendance: 1,752; Referees: Martins, Martins (POR)

19 January 2022 (Note: The match, originally scheduled for 12 February 2022, was postponed because of positive COVID-19 tests by players of Győri.); 18:45	Győri Audi ETO KC (Hungary)	40–27	(Slovenia) RK Krim Mercator	Audi Aréna, Győr; Attendance: 2,547; Referees: Vranes, Wenninger (AUT)
19 January 2022; 18:45	Hansen, Pintea 8	(22–14)	Pineau, Varagić 5	Audi Aréna, Győr; Attendance: 2,547; Referees: Vranes, Wenninger (AUT)
19 January 2022; 18:45	1× (yellow card) 2× (suspension)	Report	3× (suspension)	Audi Aréna, Győr; Attendance: 2,547; Referees: Vranes, Wenninger (AUT)

22 January 2022; 18:00	Kastamonu Bld. GSK (Turkey)	24–35	(Norway) Vipers Kristiansand	Kastamonu Atatürk Sport Hall, Kastamonu; Attendance: 2,700; Referees: Merz, Kuttler (GER)
22 January 2022; 18:00	Radičević, Yılmaz 5	(12–18)	Debelić 7	Kastamonu Atatürk Sport Hall, Kastamonu; Attendance: 2,700; Referees: Merz, Kuttler (GER)
22 January 2022; 18:00	3× (suspension)	Report	1× (yellow card) 1× (suspension)	Kastamonu Atatürk Sport Hall, Kastamonu; Attendance: 2,700; Referees: Merz, Kuttler (GER)

23 January 2022; 14:00	IK Sävehof (Sweden)	23–32	(Russia) CSKA Moscow	Partille Arena, Partille; Referees: Geraets, Geraets (NED)
23 January 2022; 14:00	Roberts 6	(10–14)	Gros 7	Partille Arena, Partille; Referees: Geraets, Geraets (NED)
23 January 2022; 14:00	1× (yellow card) 2× (suspension)	Report	1× (yellow card) 2× (suspension)	Partille Arena, Partille; Referees: Geraets, Geraets (NED)

23 January 2022; 16:00	Győri Audi ETO KC (Hungary)	27–26	(Denmark) Odense Håndbold	Audi Aréna, Győr; Attendance: 3,900; Referees: Lončar, Lončar (CRO)
23 January 2022; 16:00	Nze Minko, Bredal Oftedal 5	(12–13)	Højlund 9	Audi Aréna, Győr; Attendance: 3,900; Referees: Lončar, Lončar (CRO)
23 January 2022; 16:00	3× (suspension)	Report	1× (yellow card) 5× (suspension)	Audi Aréna, Győr; Attendance: 3,900; Referees: Lončar, Lončar (CRO)

29 January 2022; 12:00	Kastamonu Bld. GSK (Turkey)	26–29	(Sweden) IK Sävehof	Kastamonu Atatürk Sport Hall, Kastamonu; Attendance: 1,500; Referees: Covalciuc, Covalciuc (MDA)
29 January 2022; 12:00	Radičević 6	(14–16)	Tolstrup Petersen 7	Kastamonu Atatürk Sport Hall, Kastamonu; Attendance: 1,500; Referees: Covalciuc, Covalciuc (MDA)
29 January 2022; 12:00	2× (yellow card) 1× (suspension)	Report	1× (yellow card) 3× (suspension)	Kastamonu Atatürk Sport Hall, Kastamonu; Attendance: 1,500; Referees: Covalciuc, Covalciuc (MDA)

5 February 2022; 16:00	RK Krim Mercator (Slovenia)	36–28	(Turkey) Kastamonu Bld. GSK	Arena Stožice, Ljubljana; Attendance: 550; Referees: Vitaku, Vitaku (KOS)
5 February 2022; 16:00	Krpež Šlezak 13	(18–10)	Radičević 7	Arena Stožice, Ljubljana; Attendance: 550; Referees: Vitaku, Vitaku (KOS)
5 February 2022; 16:00	1× (yellow card) 2× (suspension)	Report	1× (yellow card) 3× (suspension)	Arena Stožice, Ljubljana; Attendance: 550; Referees: Vitaku, Vitaku (KOS)

5 February 2022; 18:00	Vipers Kristiansand (Norway)	25–31	(France) Metz Handball	Aquarama Kristiansand, Kristiansand; Attendance: 1,231; Referees: Weijmans, Wolbertus (NED)
5 February 2022; 18:00	Debelić 7	(13–17)	three players 6	Aquarama Kristiansand, Kristiansand; Attendance: 1,231; Referees: Weijmans, Wolbertus (NED)
5 February 2022; 18:00	2× (suspension)	Report	1× (yellow card) 6× (suspension) 1× (red card)	Aquarama Kristiansand, Kristiansand; Attendance: 1,231; Referees: Weijmans, Wolbertus (NED)

6 February 2022; 16:00	Odense Håndbold (Denmark)	37–24	(Sweden) IK Sävehof	Sydbank Arena Odense, Odense; Attendance: 1,702; Referees: Barysas, Petrusis (LTU)
6 February 2022; 16:00	Abbingh 8	(16–13)	Roberts 6	Sydbank Arena Odense, Odense; Attendance: 1,702; Referees: Barysas, Petrusis (LTU)
6 February 2022; 16:00	3× (suspension)	Report	1× (yellow card) 4× (suspension)	Sydbank Arena Odense, Odense; Attendance: 1,702; Referees: Barysas, Petrusis (LTU)

6 February 2022; 16:00	CSKA Moscow (Russia)	23–27	(Hungary) Győri Audi ETO KC	Dynamo Sports Palace, Moscow; Attendance: 1,100; Referees: Pandžić, Mošorinski (SRB)
6 February 2022; 16:00	Ilyina 8	(13–15)	Ryu 7	Dynamo Sports Palace, Moscow; Attendance: 1,100; Referees: Pandžić, Mošorinski (SRB)
6 February 2022; 16:00	2× (yellow card) 1× (suspension)	Report	1× (yellow card) 3× (suspension)	Dynamo Sports Palace, Moscow; Attendance: 1,100; Referees: Pandžić, Mošorinski (SRB)

9 February 2022 (Note: The match, originally scheduled for 23 January 2022, was postponed.); 18:45	Metz Handball (France)	27–27	(Slovenia) RK Krim Mercator	Arènes de Metz, Metz; Attendance: 3,152; Referees: Hannes, Hannes (GER)
9 February 2022; 18:45	Burgaard 5	(17–15)	Krpež Šlezak, Stanko 5	Arènes de Metz, Metz; Attendance: 3,152; Referees: Hannes, Hannes (GER)
9 February 2022; 18:45	1× (yellow card) 2× (suspension)	Report	1× (yellow card) 2× (suspension)	Arènes de Metz, Metz; Attendance: 3,152; Referees: Hannes, Hannes (GER)

12 February 2022 (Note: The match, originally scheduled for 8 January 2022, was postponed because of positive COVID-19 tests by players of RK Krim.); 16:00	Vipers Kristiansand (Norway)	37–20	(Slovenia) RK Krim Mercator	Aquarama Kristiansand, Kristiansand; Attendance: 1,036; Referees: Panayides, Andreou (CYP)
12 February 2022; 16:00	Valle Dahl 7	(17–9)	Krpež Šlezak 7	Aquarama Kristiansand, Kristiansand; Attendance: 1,036; Referees: Panayides, Andreou (CYP)
12 February 2022; 16:00	1× (yellow card) 3× (suspension)	Report	4× (suspension)	Aquarama Kristiansand, Kristiansand; Attendance: 1,036; Referees: Panayides, Andreou (CYP)

12 February 2022; 18:00	Metz Handball (France)	38–31	(Denmark) Odense Håndbold	Arènes de Metz, Metz; Attendance: 3,650; Referees: Sá, Sá (POR)
12 February 2022; 18:00	Mičijević 10	(19–17)	Abbingh 7	Arènes de Metz, Metz; Attendance: 3,650; Referees: Sá, Sá (POR)
12 February 2022; 18:00	1× (yellow card) 6× (suspension)	Report	1× (yellow card) 3× (suspension) 1× (red card)	Arènes de Metz, Metz; Attendance: 3,650; Referees: Sá, Sá (POR)

13 February 2022; 14:00	Kastamonu Bld. GSK (Turkey)	29–31	(Russia) CSKA Moscow	Kastamonu Atatürk Sport Hall, Kastamonu; Attendance: 1,800; Referees: Jović, Arnautović (BIH)
13 February 2022; 14:00	Radičević 9	(15–18)	Heindahl, Mikhaylichenko 6	Kastamonu Atatürk Sport Hall, Kastamonu; Attendance: 1,800; Referees: Jović, Arnautović (BIH)
13 February 2022; 14:00	2× (suspension)	Report	2× (yellow card) 1× (suspension)	Kastamonu Atatürk Sport Hall, Kastamonu; Attendance: 1,800; Referees: Jović, Arnautović (BIH)

13 February 2022 (Note: The match, originally scheduled for 9 January 2022, was postponed because of positive COVID-19 tests by players of Győri.); 16:00	IK Sävehof (Sweden)	25–31	(Hungary) Győri Audi ETO KC	Partille Arena, Partille; Attendance: 1,275; Referees: Kijauskaitė, Žalienė (LTU)
13 February 2022; 16:00	Roberts 7	(12–15)	Hansen 6	Partille Arena, Partille; Attendance: 1,275; Referees: Kijauskaitė, Žalienė (LTU)
13 February 2022; 16:00	2× (yellow card) 2× (suspension)	Report	1× (yellow card) 1× (suspension)	Partille Arena, Partille; Attendance: 1,275; Referees: Kijauskaitė, Žalienė (LTU)

19 February 2022; 18:00	Vipers Kristiansand (Norway)	30–29	(Hungary) Győri Audi ETO KC	Aquarama Kristiansand, Kristiansand; Attendance: 1,900; Referees: Budzák, Záhradník (SVK)
19 February 2022; 18:00	Gulldén, Jeřábková 6	(16–13)	Hansen 6	Aquarama Kristiansand, Kristiansand; Attendance: 1,900; Referees: Budzák, Záhradník (SVK)
19 February 2022; 18:00	1× (yellow card) 1× (suspension)	Report	3× (suspension)	Aquarama Kristiansand, Kristiansand; Attendance: 1,900; Referees: Budzák, Záhradník (SVK)

20 February 2022; 14:00	RK Krim Mercator (Slovenia)	32–18	(Sweden) IK Sävehof	Arena Stožice, Ljubljana; Attendance: 1,100; Referees: Alpaidze, Berezkina (RUS)
20 February 2022; 14:00	Stanko 8	(12–9)	Nilsson Åström 4	Arena Stožice, Ljubljana; Attendance: 1,100; Referees: Alpaidze, Berezkina (RUS)
20 February 2022; 14:00	1× (yellow card) 3× (suspension)	Report	1× (suspension)	Arena Stožice, Ljubljana; Attendance: 1,100; Referees: Alpaidze, Berezkina (RUS)

20 February 2022; 16:00	CSKA Moscow (Russia)	27–26	(France) Metz Handball	Dynamo Sports Palace, Moscow; Attendance: 940; Referees: Covalciuc, Covalciuc (MDA)
20 February 2022; 16:00	Gros 7	(12–15)	Horacek 5	Dynamo Sports Palace, Moscow; Attendance: 940; Referees: Covalciuc, Covalciuc (MDA)
20 February 2022; 16:00	1× (yellow card) 2× (suspension)	Report	5× (suspension)	Dynamo Sports Palace, Moscow; Attendance: 940; Referees: Covalciuc, Covalciuc (MDA)

20 February 2022; 16:00	Odense Håndbold (Denmark)	37–29	(Turkey) Kastamonu Bld. GSK	Sydbank Arena Odense, Odense; Attendance: 1,512; Referees: Lidacka, Lesiak (POL)
20 February 2022; 16:00	Aardahl 8	(18–13)	Radičević 6	Sydbank Arena Odense, Odense; Attendance: 1,512; Referees: Lidacka, Lesiak (POL)
20 February 2022; 16:00	1× (yellow card) 1× (suspension)	Report	4× (suspension)	Sydbank Arena Odense, Odense; Attendance: 1,512; Referees: Lidacka, Lesiak (POL)
