= 2021–22 Women's EHF Champions League =

Women's EHF Champions League
- 2021–22

Tournament information
- Sport: Handball
- Dates: 11 September 2021–5 June 2022
- Teams: 16
- Website: ehfcl.com

Final positions
- Champions: (Norway) Vipers Kristiansand
- Runner-up: (Hungary) Győri Audi ETO KC

Tournament statistics
- Matches played: 123
- Goals scored: 6953 (56.53 per match)
- Attendance: 242,196 (1,969 per match)
- Top scorer(s): (Romania) Cristina Neagu (110 goals)

The 2021–22 Women's EHF Champions League was the 29th edition of Europe's premier club handball tournament, running from 11 September 2021 to 5 June 2022.

Because of the COVID-19 pandemic, each local health department allowed a different number of spectators.

Vipers Kristiansand defended their title after a finals win over Győri Audi ETO KC.

== Format ==
The competition began with a group stage featuring 16 teams divided in two groups. Matches were played in a double round-robin system with home-and-away fixtures. In Groups A and B, the top two teams qualified for the quarterfinals, with teams ranked third to sixth entering the playoffs.

The knockout stage included four rounds: the round of 16, quarterfinals, and a final-four tournament comprising two semifinals and the final. The teams were paired against each other in two-legged home-and-away matches, with the aggregate winners qualifying to the next round.

In the final four tournament, the semifinals and the final were played as single matches at a pre-selected host venue.

== Team allocation ==
Location of teams of the 2021–22 Women's EHF Champions League group stage.
Red: Group A; Blue: Group B.

A total of 21 teams from 15 countries submitted their application for a place in the competition's group stage before the deadline of 21 June 2021. The final list of 16 participants was revealed by the EHF Executive Committee on 29 June 2021.

(Croatia) HC Podravka Vegeta	(Denmark) Odense Håndbold	(Denmark) Team Esbjerg	(France) Brest Bretagne Handball
(France) Metz Handball	(Germany) BV Borussia 09 Dortmund^{1}	(Hungary) FTC-Rail Cargo Hungaria	(Hungary) Győri Audi ETO KC
(Montenegro) Budućnost BEMAX	(Norway) Vipers Kristiansand	(Romania) CSM București	(Russia) CSKA Moscow
(Russia) Rostov-Don	(Slovenia) RK Krim Mercator	(Sweden) IK Sävehof	(Turkey) Kastamonu Bld. GSK

Wildcard rejection
(Czech Republic) DHK Baník Most	(Germany) SG BBM Bietigheim	(Norway) Storhamar Håndball Elite	(Romania) CS Minaur Baia Mare

- 1: As the German club did not play the play-off matches vs Metz in the previous season, a deposit of an amount of €140,000 in two instalments was requested from Dortmund to cover any financial damages or requests for refunds in case the club would not play certain matches or drop out of the competition again. In case no payments were requested neither from the club nor from the EHF in this relation the deposit was transferred back to the club. The receipt of the two instalments (the first by 13 and the second by 27 July) was a precondition to uphold the participation of the club in the DELO EHF Champions League 2021/22, otherwise, the substitute club (DHK Banik Most) would have replaced Borussia Dortmund.

== Group stage ==
The draw took place on 2 July 2021.

=== Group A ===
Pos	Team	Pld	W	D	L	GF	GA	GD	Pts	Qualification	ESB	ROS	FER	BRE	BUC	DOR	BUD	POD
1	(Denmark) Team Esbjerg	14	10	3	1	412	346	+66	23	Quarterfinals	—	25–18	33–27	28–28	22–21	34–24	35–20	30–17
2	(Russia) Rostov-Don	14	10	1	3	362	302	+60	21	Quarterfinals	25–27	—	19–20	26–24	10–0	37–27	30–20	34–23
3	(Hungary) FTC-Rail Cargo Hungaria	14	8	3	3	378	372	+6	19	Playoffs	31–31	25–25	—	28–27	31–30	23–21	26–22	33–27
4	(France) Brest Bretagne Handball	14	8	1	5	392	365	+27	17	Playoffs	26–23	18–29	30–25	—	24–21	31–25	25–21	35–22
5	(Romania) CSM București	14	7	1	6	365	342	+23	15	Playoffs	29–29	27–30	27–21	29–30	—	33–29	30–22	29–21
6	(Germany) BV Borussia 09 Dortmund	14	4	1	9	391	399	−8	9	Playoffs	29–32	25–31	25–25	30–27	22–25	—	30–34	38–14
7	(Montenegro) Budućnost BEMAX	14	3	0	11	337	407	−70	6		25–36	19–25	26–30	30–28	20–28	29–34	—	27–21
8	(Croatia) HC Podravka Vegeta	14	1	0	13	334	438	−104	2		26–27	22–23	29–33	28–39	31–36	24–32	29–22	—

Source: EHF
Rules for classification: Tiebreakers

=== Group B ===
Pos	Team	Pld	W	D	L	GF	GA	GD	Pts	Qualification	GYO	VIP	MET	MOS	ODE	KRI	SÄV	KAS
1	(Hungary) Győri Audi ETO KC	14	13	0	1	471	354	+117	26	Quarterfinals	—	35–29	39–30	32–22	27–26	40–27	41–19	37–20
2	(Norway) Vipers Kristiansand	14	10	0	4	435	370	+65	20	Quarterfinals	30–29	—	25–31	24–27	31–27	37–20	34–25	39–25
3	(France) Metz Handball	14	9	1	4	413	375	+38	19	Playoffs	29–33	23–18	—	24–32	38–31	27–27	35–21	33–25
4	(Russia) CSKA Moscow	14	7	2	5	375	372	+3	16	Playoffs	23–27	28–32	27–26	—	21–28	21–21	29–28	34–27
5	(Denmark) Odense Håndbold	14	7	1	6	405	386	+19	15	Playoffs	26–31	27–32	21–27	27–27	—	26–24	37–24	37–29
6	(Slovenia) RK Krim Mercator	14	4	2	8	362	381	−19	10	Playoffs	26–31	26–27	28–29	24–21	19–24	—	32–18	36–28
7	(Sweden) IK Sävehof	14	3	0	11	351	461	−110	6		25–31	23–42	28–31	23–32	31–37	29–28	—	28–26
8	(Turkey) Kastamonu Bld. GSK	14	0	0	14	349	462	−113	0		22–38	24–35	20–30	29–31	25–31	23–24	26–29	—

Source: EHF
Rules for classification: Tiebreakers

== Knockout stage ==
=== Playoffs ===
Team 1	Agg.	Team 2	1st leg	2nd leg
RK Krim Mercator (Slovenia)	55–52	(Hungary) FTC-Rail Cargo Hungaria	33–26	22–26
BV Borussia 09 Dortmund (Germany)	41–62	(France) Metz Handball	22–30	19–32
Odense Håndbold (Denmark)	51–53	(France) Brest Bretagne Handball	25–24	26–29
CSM București (Romania)	20–0	(Russia) CSKA Moscow	10–0	10–0

=== Quarterfinals ===
Team 1	Agg.	Team 2	1st leg	2nd leg
CSM București (Romania)	52–53	(Denmark) Team Esbjerg	25–26	27–27
Brest Bretagne Handball (France)	44–56	(Hungary) Győri Audi ETO KC	21–21	23–35
Metz Handball (France)	20–0	(Russia) Rostov-Don	10–0	10–0
RK Krim Mercator (Slovenia)	49–65	(Norway) Vipers Kristiansand	25–32	24–33

=== Final four ===
The final four will held at the MVM Dome in Budapest, Hungary on 4 and 5 June 2022.

==== Bracket ====
Semi-finals
4 June
(Hungary) Győri Audi ETO KC	32
(Denmark) Team Esbjerg	27
4 June
(France) Metz Handball	27
(Norway) Vipers Kristiansand	33

Final
5 June
(Hungary) Győri Audi ETO KC	31
(Norway) Vipers Kristiansand	33
Third place
5 June
(Denmark) Team Esbjerg	26
(France) Metz Handball	32

==== Final ====
5 June 2022; 18:00	Győri Audi ETO KC (Hungary)	31–33	(Norway) Vipers Kristiansand	MVM Dome, Budapest; Attendance: 15,400; Referees: Merz, Kuttler (GER)
5 June 2022; 18:00	Hansen 6	(13–15)	Jeřábková 7	MVM Dome, Budapest; Attendance: 15,400; Referees: Merz, Kuttler (GER)
5 June 2022; 18:00	1× (yellow card) 1× (suspension)	Report	1× (yellow card) 2× (suspension)	MVM Dome, Budapest; Attendance: 15,400; Referees: Merz, Kuttler (GER)

== Top goalscorers ==
Rank	Player	Club	Goals
1	(Romania) Cristina Neagu	(Romania) CSM București	110
2	(Norway) Nora Mørk	(Norway) Vipers Kristiansand	107
3	(Slovenia) Ana Gros	(Russia) CSKA Moscow/ (Slovenia) RK Krim Mercator	104
3	(Norway) Henny Reistad	(Denmark) Team Esbjerg	104
5	(France) Grâce Zaadi	(Russia) Rostov-Don/ (France) Metz Handball	91
6	(Norway) Helene Gigstad Fauske	(France) Brest Bretagne Handball	87
6	(Sweden) Jamina Roberts	(Sweden) IK Sävehof	87
8	(Montenegro) Jovanka Radičević	(Turkey) Kastamonu Bld. GSK	86
9	(Germany) Alina Grijseels	(Germany) BV Borussia 09 Dortmund	84
10	(Norway) Kristine Breistøl	(Denmark) Team Esbjerg	83

== Awards ==
The all-star team was announced on 3 June 2022.

Position	Player
Goalkeeper	(France) Laura Glauser (Győri Audi ETO KC)
Right wing	(Netherlands) Angela Malestein (FTC-Rail Cargo Hungaria)
Right back	(Norway) Nora Mørk (Vipers Kristiansand)
Centre back	(Norway) Stine Bredal Oftedal (Győri Audi ETO KC)
Left back	(Romania) Cristina Neagu (CSM Bucureşti)
Left wing	(Norway) Sanna Solberg-Isaksen (Team Esbjerg)
Pivot	(Sweden) Linn Blohm (Győri Audi ETO KC)
Final four MVP	(Czech Republic) Markéta Jeřábková (Vipers Kristiansand)
Best defender	(Norway) Kari Brattset Dale (Győri Audi ETO KC)
Best young player	(France) Pauletta Foppa (Brest Bretagne Handball)
Best coach	(Spain) Ambros Martín (Győri Audi ETO KC)
