= Laura Kürthi =

Hungarian handball player (born 2002)

Personal information
- Full name: Laura Klaudia Kürthi
- Nationality: Hungarian
- Born: 16 March 2002 (age 24) Győr, Hungary
- Height: 1.80 m (5 ft 11 in)

Sport
- Sport: Handball
- Position: Right back
- Current club: Komáromi VSE
- Number: 5

Youth career
- Years: Team
- 2014–2019: Győri Audi ETO KC

Senior clubs
- Years: Team
- 2019–2022: Győri Audi ETO KC
- 2021–2022: MTK Budapest (loan)
- 2022–2023: Váci NKSE
- 2023–: Komáromi VSE
Medal record
Youth European Championship
Gold medal – first place	2019 Slovenia

Laura Klaudia Kürthi (born 16 March 2002) is a Hungarian handball player for Komáromi VSE and the Hungarian national junior team.

She also represented Hungary in the 2019 European Women's U-17 Handball Championship, where she received gold.

== Achievements ==
- Youth European Championship:
  - Gold Medalist: 2019

== Individual awards ==
- All-Star Team Best Right Wing of the Youth European Championship: 2019
