= Ambros Martín =

Spanish handball player and coach (born 1968)

Personal information
- Full name: Ambrosio José Martín Cedres
- Nationality: Spanish
- Born: 30 April 1968 (age 58) Arrecife, Spain

Sport
- Sport: Handball
- Position: Wing

Senior clubs
- Years: Team
- –: 3 de Mayo
- –: BM Puerto Cruz
- –: BM Torrelavega
- –: Cadagua Gáldar
- 1997–2003: Portland San Antonio

Teams managed
- 2003–2004: Naranco Oviedo
- 2004–2012: SD Itxako
- 2012–2018: Győri ETO KC
- 2016–2019: Romania
- 2018–2020: Rostov-Don
- 2019–2020: Russia
- 2021–2023: Győri ETO KC
- 2023–: Spain
- 2024–2025: RK Krim

Ambrosio José Martín Cedres (born 30 April 1968) is a Spanish former handball player and current coach.

In the summer of 2012, he replaced Karl Erik Bøhn as head coach of Győri ETO KC. Contemporaneously with his job in Hungary, he has been also coaching the Romania women's national handball team since 4 October 2016. In February 2018 he announced, that he will not extend his contract with Győr and will leave the club at the end of the season. Between 2018 and 2020 he was the head coach of Rostov-Don. In May 2019 his contract at the Romanian national team was terminated on mutual consent. In August 2019 he replaced Yevgeni Trefilov as the head coach of the Russian national team. On 31 July 2020 it was announced that his contract with Rostov-Don was terminated on mutual consent. He returned to Győr in 2021.

Martín was the first Spanish coach to win the Champions League trophy with a foreign club. He was named Coach of the Year in the Women's EHF Champions League for four straight years (2015–2018).

== International honours ==
=== Player ===
Cadagua Gáldar

- EHF City Cup:
  - Runner-up: 1995

SDC San Antonio

- EHF Champions League:
  - Winner: 2001
  - Runner-up: 2003
- EHF Supercup:
  - Winner: 2000
  - Runner-up: 2001
- EHF Cup Winners' Cup:
  - Winner: 2000

=== Manager ===
Russia

- World Championship:
  - Bronze medal: 2019

Rostov

- Women's EHF Champions League:
  - Runner-up: 2019

Győr

- Women's EHF Champions League:
  - Winner: 2013, 2014, 2017, 2018
  - Runner-up: 2016, 2022
  - Bronze medal: 2021

Itxako

- Women's EHF Champions League:
  - Runner-up: 2011
- Women's EHF Cup:
  - Winner: 2009
  - Runner-up: 2008

Individual

- Women's EHF Champions League Best Coach: 2014–15, 2015–16, 2016–17, 2017–18, 2021–22
