= Angela Malestein =

Dutch handball player (born 1993)

Personal information
- Full name: Antje Angela Malestein
- Nationality: Dutch
- Born: 31 January 1993 (age 33) Spakenburg, Netherlands
- Height: 1.70 m (5 ft 7 in)

Sport
- Sport: Handball
- Position: Right wing
- Current club: Ferencvárosi TC
- Number: 26

Senior clubs
- Years: Team
- 2008–2011: VOC Amsterdam
- 2011–2012: SV Dalfsen Handbal
- 2012–2014: HSG Blomberg-Lippe
- 2014–2020: SG BBM Bietigheim
- 2020–: Ferencvárosi TC
National team
Years	Team	Apps	(Gls)
2009–	Netherlands	245	(880)
Medal record
World Championship
Gold medal – first place	2019 Japan
Silver medal – second place	2015 Denmark
Bronze medal – third place	2017 Germany
European Championship
Silver medal – second place	2016 Sweden
Bronze medal – third place	2018 France
- Updated on 14 December 2025

Antje Angela Malestein (born 31 January 1993) is a Dutch handball player for Ferencvárosi TC and the Dutch national team.

She was a part the Netherlands team that won the 2019 World Women's Handball Championship; the first title in the country's history.

== Career ==
Angela Malestein started her career at VOC Amsterdam in 2008, where she played until 2011 where she joined SV Dalfsen Handbal, where she won the Eredivisie. A year later she joined German team HSG Blomberg-Lippe. In 2014 she joined league rivals SG BBM Bietigheim. Here she won the 2017 and 2019 German championship.

In 2020 she joined Hungarian side Ferencvárosi TC. Here she won the 2021 and 2024 Hungarian championship and the 2022, 2023 and 2024 Hungarian cup. She also reached the final of the 2022-2023 Champions League.

=== National team ===
Malestein debuted for the Dutch national team on 26 November 2009, against Germany.

At the 2011 U-19 European championship she won silver medals with the Dutch team.

She participated at 2010 European Championship and at the 2011 and 2013 World Championships.

Malestein also competed at the 2012 Women's Junior World Handball Championship in the Czech Republic.

She won bronze medals at both the 2017 World Championship and the 2018 European Championship.

Her biggest achievement came at 2019 World Championship in Japan, where Netherlands won gold medals, beating Spain in the final 30:29

She also represented the Netherlands at the 2016 Olympics in Rio de Janeiro and the 2020 Olympics in Tokyo.

At the 2023 World Championship she finished 5th with the Dutch team.

== Achievements ==
- EHF Champions League
  - Silver: 2023
- Bundesliga
  - Gold: 2017, 2019
- Eredivisie
  - Gold: 2012
- Nemzeti Bajnokság
  - Gold: 2021, 2024
- Magyar Kupa
  - Gold: 2022, 2023, 2024, 2025

== Individual awards ==
- All-Star Right Wing of the EHF Champions League: 2022
- EHF Excellence Awards Best right wing of the season: 2022/23
