= Sára Kovářová =

Czech handball player (born 1999)

Personal information
- Nationality: Czech
- Born: 9 February 1999 (age 27) Písek, Czech Republic
- Height: 1.74 m (5 ft 9 in)

Sport
- Sport: Handball
- Position: Right back
- Current club: AZS Koszalin
- Number: 48

Senior clubs
- Years: Team
- 2016–2020: DHK Baník Most
- 2020–2022: Kastamonu Belediyesi
- 2022–2023: RK Krim
- 2024–2025: HC Dunărea Brăila
- 2025–: AZS Koszalin
National team
Years	Team	Apps	(Gls)
2018–	Czech Republic	59	(105)
- Updated on 29 October 2025

Sára Kovářová (born 9 February 1999) is a Czech handballer for Polish club AZS Koszalin and the Czech national team.

She participated at the 2018 European Women's Handball Championship.
