= Helene Fauske =

Norwegian handball player (born 1997)

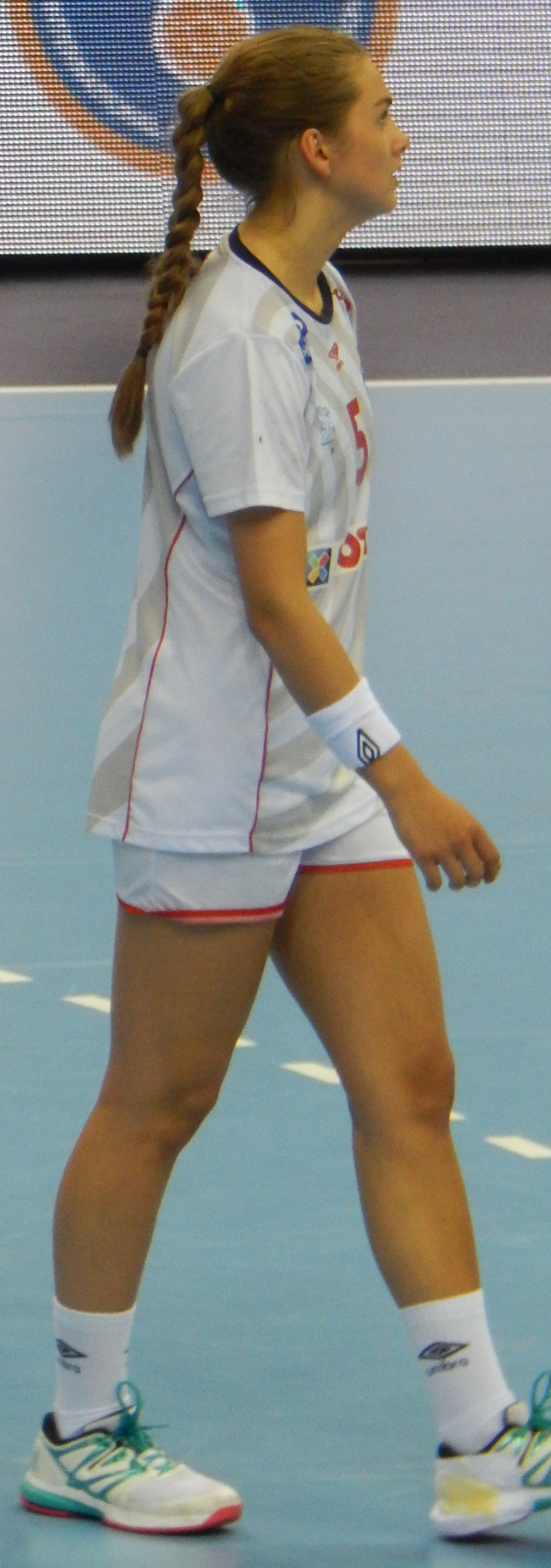
- Fauske in 2016

Personal information
- Nationality: Norwegian
- Born: Helene Gigstad Fauske; 31 January 1997 (age 29) Bærum, Norway
- Height: 1.78 m (5 ft 10 in)

Sport
- Sport: Handball
- Position: Left/centre back
- Current club: Odense Håndbold
- Number: 7

Senior clubs
- Years: Team
- 2013–2017: Stabæk IF
- 2017–2021: Herning-Ikast Håndbold
- 2021–2023: Brest Bretagne Handball
- 2023–2024: Neptunes de Nantes
- 2024–2027: Odense Håndbold
National team
Years	Team	Apps	(Gls)
2017–2022	Norway	35	(25)
Medal record
World Championship
Silver medal – second place	2017 Germany

Helene Gigstad Fauske (born 31 January 1997) is a Norwegian handball player for Odense Håndbold and formerly the Norwegian national team.

== Career ==
=== Stabæk ===
Fauske started her career at her hometown club Stabæk IF, where she made her senior debut in the 2013-14 season.

She represented Norway at the 2016 Women's Junior World Handball Championship, placing 5th, at the 2015 European Women's U-19 Handball Championship, placing 6th and at the 2013 Youth European Championship, placing 7th.

=== FC Midtjylland ===
In 2017 she joined FC Midtjylland. Here she won the Danish Cup in 2019. In the same season the club reached the final of the Danish Championship, where they lost to Team Esbjerg.

At the 2017 World Championship, she won silver medals with Norway, losing to France in the final. She was included in the team for the final to replace the injured Silje Solberg.

In October 2020, Fauske announced that she no longer would be available to the national team, as she did not feel, she was good enough to play for the national team. She came back to the national team in 2022.

=== Brest Bretagne ===
In 2021 she joined French side Brest Bretagne Handball.

During her first season with Brest Bretagne Handball (2021–2022), she was the club's top goalscorer in the French League (118 goals in 27 matches, 6th top goalscorer) and in the Champions League (87 goals; 6th top goalscorer). During her second season, she was also BBH's top goalscorer. In both seasons she finished as the runner-up in the French league.

=== Nantes ===
In 2023 she joined Neptunes de Nantes.

=== Odense Håndbold ===
After a season at Nantes, she joined Danish side Odense Håndbold.

In the 2024-25 season, she achieved a perfect regular season with Odense Håndbold, winning 26 of 26 games. Later the same season she won the Danish Championship, when Odense beat Team Esbjerg in the final 2-1 in matches.

== Achievements ==
=== Club ===
- EHF Champions League:
  - silver: 2025
- Danish league (Damehåndboldligaen):
  - Winner: 2025 (with Odense Håndbold)
  - Runner up: 2019 (with Herning-Ikast Håndbold), 2026 (with Odense Håndbold)
- Danish Cup
  - Winner: 2019 (with Herning-Ikast Håndbold)
- French league:
  - Runner up: 2022 and 2023 (with Brest Bretagne Handball)

=== International ===
- World Championship:
  - Silver: 2017

== Individual awards ==
- Best Rookie of Grundigligaen: 2016/2017
- All-Star Left Back of Grundigligaen: 2016/2017
- All-Star Centre Back of Damehåndboldligaen: 2018/2019
- Danish League's Player of the Month: January 2019
- Top Scorer of the EHF European League with 61 goals: 2020/21
- French League's Player of the Month: February 2022
