= Alina Grijseels =

German handball player (born 1996)

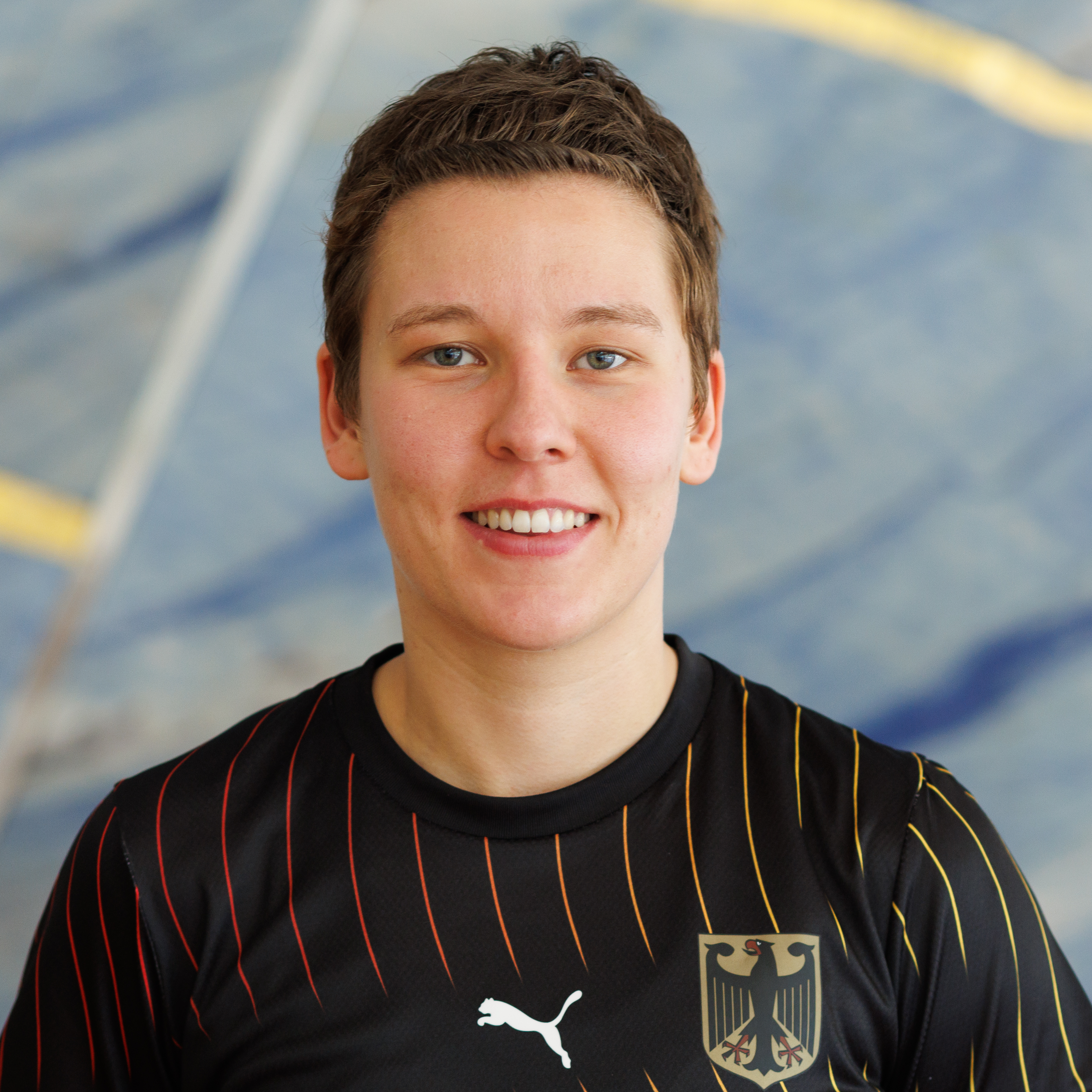

Personal information
- Nationality: German
- Born: 12 April 1996 (age 30) Wesel, Germany
- Height: 1.74 m (5 ft 9 in)

Sport
- Sport: Handball
- Position: Centre back
- Current club: Borussia Dortmund
- Number: 4

Senior clubs
- Years: Team
- –: TV Biefang 1912
- –2013: TV Aldenrade
- –2015: TV Aldekerk
- 2013–2014: TuS Lintfort
- 2014–2023: Borussia Dortmund
- 2023–2024: Metz HB
- 2024–2025: CSM București
- 2025–: Borussia Dortmund
National team
Years	Team	Apps	(Gls)
2018–	Germany	112	(393)
Medal record
World Championship
Silver medal – second place	2025 Netherlands/Germany
- Updated on 7 November 2025

Alina Grijseels (born 12 April 1996) is a German handball player for Borussia Dortmund and the German national team.

She participated at the 2018 European Championship. and at 2024 Summer Olympics. In June 2021 she was appointed captain of the German national team together with Emily Bölk.

She represented Germany at the 2025 World Women's Handball Championship. Here Germany reached the final, where they lost to Norway. This was the first time since 1994 that Germany made the final of a major international tournament and the first time they won a medal since 2007.

== Achievements ==
- World Championship:
  - Silver : 2025
- Handball-Bundesliga Frauen:
  - Winner: 2021
- DHB-Pokal:
  - Finalist: 2016
- LFH Division 1 Féminine:
  - Winners (1): 2024
- French Cup:
  - Winners (1): 2024
