= Jovana Sazdovska =

Macedonian handball player

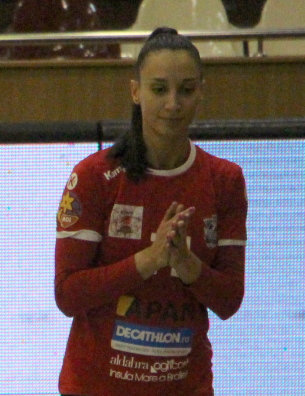

Personal information
- Nationality: Macedonian
- Born: 27 June 1993 (age 33) Skopje, Macedonia
- Height: 1.77 m (5 ft 10 in)

Sport
- Sport: Handball
- Position: Left wing
- Current club: Dunărea Brăila

Youth career
- Years: Team
- –: WHC Metalurg

Senior clubs
- Years: Team
- 2006–2016: WHC Metalurg
- 2016–2017: Măgura Cisnădie
- 2017–2018: HC Vardar
- 2018–2020: Thüringer HC
- 2020–2023: Dunărea Brăila
- 2023–2025: CSM Slatina
National team
Years	Team	Apps	(Gls)
–	North Macedonia	45	(124)
- Updated on 12 November 2024

Jovana Sazdovska (born 27 June 1993) is a Macedonian female former handballer who played as a left wing for CSM Slatina and the North Macedonia national team.

== Career ==
Born in Skopje, Macedonia, she is part of her country's senior national team. She started playing handball at the age of 12 at WHC Metalurg. Her greatest achievement at club level is the 2nd place in the 2017–18 Champions League with HC Vardar and winning the German Cup with Thüringer HC.

Jovana played in the Romanian championship for Măgura Cisnădie in the 2016–2017 season. The ambitious player came to Dunărea Brăila with the intention of evolving as much as possible and helping her team by scoring goals.

Throughout her career she has also played for teams such as: Măgura Cisnădie (2016–2017), ŽRK Vardar Skopje (2017–2018), Thüringer HC (2018–2020) and Dunărea Brăila (2020–2023). Her track record also includes: the Champions League final with ŽRK Vardar Skopje, participation in the EHF Cup with Dunărea Brăila, where she scored 26 goals, and presence at the 2022 and 2024 European Championship with the North Macedonia national team.

She retired after the 2025 season.

== Playing style ==
As a true winger, speed was her strong point and she only needed a split of a second to take on her opponent.

== Accomplishments ==
WHC Metalurg

- Championship of Macedonia (North Macedonia)

Winners Gold (3): 2010, 2011, 2012

- Macedonian Cup (North Macedonia)

Winners Gold (3): 2010, 2011, 2012

=== European competitions (European Union) ===
- Challenge Cup

Semi-Finalist Bronze (1): 2009/10

=== Other competitions ===
- WRHL Women

Finalist Silver (1) : 2011/12
Third place Bronze (1) : 2009/10

WHC Vardar

- Macedonian First League: (North Macedonia)

Winner (1): 2017–18

- Macedonian Cup (North Macedonia)

Winner (1): 2018

=== European competitions (European Union) ===
- EHF Champions League:

Runner-up: 2017–18

=== Other competitions ===
- Women's Regional Handball League:

Winner: 2017–18

HC Thuringen

- DHB-Pokal: (Germany)
  - Winner (1): 2019
