= 2018–19 Women's EHF Challenge Cup =

Women's EHF Challenge Cup
- 2018–19

Tournament information
- Sport: Handball
- Dates: 10 November 2018–12 May 2019
- Teams: 31
- Website: eurohandball.com

Final positions
- Champions: (Spain) Rocasa Gran Canaria ACE
- Runner-up: (Poland) Pogoń Baltica Szczecin

Tournament statistics
- Matches played: 60
- Top scorer(s): Agata Cebula; Haridian Rodríguez (42 goals)

The 2018–19 Women's EHF Challenge Cup was the 22nd edition of the European Handball Federation's third-tier competition for women's handball clubs, running from 10 November 2018.

== Overview ==
=== Team allocation ===
There were no matches in Round 1 and 2 and all 30 teams started in Round 3 with the first leg scheduled for 10/11 November and second leg for 17/18 November.

Last 16
(Spain) Rocasa Gran Canaria ACE			
Round 3
(Poland) Pogoń Baltica Szczecin	(Croatia) ŽRK Koka	(Turkey) Polatli Belediyespor	(Netherlands) Dames 1 V&L
(Sweden) Kristianstad Handboll	(North Macedonia) ŽRK Pelister	(Switzerland) DHB Rotweiss Thun	(Portugal) AC Alavarium
(Serbia) HC Naisa Niš	(Azerbaijan) Azeryol Baku	(Kosovo) KHF Istogu	(Slovenia) ŽRK Z'dežele Celje
(Iceland) Valur	(Lithuania) MRK Žalgiris Kaunas	(Israel) Holon HC	(Bosnia and Herzegovina) ŽRK Krivaja Zavidovići
(Finland) HIFK Handboll	(Belgium) Fémina Visé	(Italy) Cassano Magnago HC	(Belarus) HC Gomel
(Cyprus) AC Latsia Nicosia	(Malta) La Salle HC	(Spain) Rincón Fertilidad Málaga	(Croatia) ŽRK Bjelovar
(Turkey) Ankara Yenimahalle BSK	(Netherlands) Quintus	(Sweden) Boden Handboll IF	(North Macedonia) ŽRK Kumanovo
(Portugal) Sir 1 Maio/Ada CJB	(Israel) Maccabi Rishon LeZion		

=== Round and draw dates ===
All draws were held at the European Handball Federation headquarters in Vienna, Austria.

Round	Draw date	First leg	Second leg
Round 3	17 July 2018	10-11 November 2018	17-18 November 2018
Last 16	20 November 2018	2-3 February 2019	9-10 February 2019
Quarter-final	12 February 2019	2-3 March 2019	9-10 March 2019
Semi-finals	12 February 2019	6-7 April 2019	13-14 April 2019
Final	16 April 2019	4-5 May 2019	11-12 May 2019

== Qualification stage ==
=== Round 3 ===
There were 30 teams participating in round 3. The draw seeding pots were composed as follows:

Pot 1	Pot 2
(Poland) Pogoń Baltica Szczecin; (Croatia) ŽRK Koka; (Turkey) Polatli Belediyespor; (Netherlands) Dames 1 V&L; (Sweden) Kristianstad Handboll; (North Macedonia) ŽRK Pelister; (Switzerland) DHB Rotweiss Thun; (Portugal) AC Alavarium; (Serbia) HC Naisa Niš; (Azerbaijan) Azeryol HC; (Kosovo) KHF Istogu; (Slovenia) ŽRK Z'dežele Celje; (Iceland) Valur; (Lithuania) MRK Žalgiris Kaunas; (Israel) Holon HC	(Bosnia and Herzegovina) ŽRK Krivaja Zavidovići; (Finland) HIFK Handboll; (Belgium) Fémina Visé; (Italy) Cassano Magnago HC; (Belarus) HC Gomel; (Cyprus) AC Latsia Nicosia; (Malta) La Salle HC; (Spain) Rincón Fertilidad Málaga; (Croatia) ŽRK Bjelovar; (Turkey) Ankara Yenimahalle BSK; (Netherlands) Quintus; (Sweden) Boden Handboll IF; (North Macedonia) ŽRK Kumanovo; (Portugal) Sir 1 Maio/Ada CJB; (Israel) Maccabi Rishon LeZion

Teams listed first played the first leg at home. Some teams agreed to play both matches in the same venue. The first legs were played on 10–11 November and the second legs were played on 17–18 November 2018. Some teams agreed to play both matches in the same venue.

Team 1	Agg.	Team 2	1st leg	2nd leg
DHB Rotweiss Thun (Switzerland)	50–53	(Spain) Rincón Fertilidad Málaga	28–28	22–25
MRK Žalgiris Kaunas (Lithuania)	57–65	(Belarus) HC Gomel	31–35	26–30
La Salle HC (Malta)	44–57	(North Macedonia) ŽRK Pelister	24–30	20–27
AC Latsia Nicosia (Cyprus)	38–67 ^{1}	(Croatia) ŽRK Koka	18–32	20–35
Polatli Belediyespor (Turkey)	53–60	(Israel) Maccabi Rishon LeZion	26–24	27–36
Pogoń Baltica Szczecin (Poland)	54–43 ^{2}	(Finland) HIFK Handboll	33–22	21–21
Quintus (Netherlands)	45–40 ^{3}	(Iceland) Valur	24–20	21–20
KHF Istogu (Kosovo)	49–45 ^{4}	(Italy) Cassano Magnago HC	26–24	23–21
ŽRK Bjelovar (Croatia)	45–49 ^{5}	(Sweden) Kristianstad Handboll	23–22	22–27
Ankara Yenimahalle BSK (Turkey)	60–54 ^{6}	(Azerbaijan) Azeryol HC	29–30	31–24
ŽRK Kumanovo (North Macedonia)	36–70 ^{7}	(Netherlands) Dames 1 V&L	15–39	21–31
ŽRK Krivaja Zavidovići (Bosnia and Herzegovina)	37–62 ^{8}	(Portugal) AC Alavarium	17–35	20–27
ŽRK Z'dežele Celje (Slovenia)	55–66 ^{9}	(Sweden) Boden Handboll IF	27–27	28–39
Sir 1 Maio/Ada CJB (Portugal)	40–58 ^{10}	(Serbia) HC Naisa Niš	17–28	23–30
Holon HC (Israel)	45–52 ^{11}	(Belgium) Fémina Visé	23–26	22–26

Notes

^{1} Both legs were hosted by ŽRK Koka.
^{2} Both legs were hosted by Pogoń Baltica Szczecin.
^{3} Both legs were hosted by Quintus.
^{4} Both legs were hosted by KHF Istogu.
^{5} Both legs were hosted by ŽRK Bjelovar.
^{6} Both legs were hosted by Ankara Yenimahalle BSK.
^{7} Both legs were hosted by ŽRK Kumanovo.
^{8} Both legs were hosted by AC Alavarium.
^{9} Both legs were hosted by Boden Handboll IF.
^{10} Both legs were hosted by Sir 1 Maio/Ada CJB.
^{11} Both legs were hosted by Fémina Visé.

== Last 16 ==
The European Handball Federation has decided the last season's runners-up and the 2016 winners Rocasa Gran Canaria ACE will be the only team, who are directly seeded for the Last 16 round.

Seeding pots

There are 16 teams participating in Last 16 round. The draw seeding pots were composed as follows:

Pot 1	Pot 2
(Croatia) ŽRK Koka; (Spain) Rincón Fertilidad Málaga; (Spain) Rocasa Gran Canaria ACE; (Israel) Maccabi Rishon LeZion; (North Macedonia) ŽRK Pelister; (Netherlands) Dames 1 V&L; (Poland) Pogoń Baltica Szczecin; (Sweden) Kristianstad Handboll	(Belgium) Fémina Visé; (Belarus) HC Gomel; (Kosovo) KHF Istogu; (Netherlands) Quintus; (Portugal) AC Alavarium; (Serbia) HC Naisa Niš; (Sweden) Boden Handboll IF; (Turkey) Ankara Yenimahalle BSK

The draw for the Last 16 took place at the EHF Office in Vienna on Thursday 22 November 2019. Teams listed first played the first leg at home. The first legs were played on 2-3 February and the second legs were played on 9-10 February 2019.Some teams agreed to play both matches in the same venue.

Team 1	Agg.	Team 2	1st leg	2nd leg
Maccabi Rishon LeZion (Israel)	55–56 ^{1}	(Sweden) Boden Handboll IF	26–26	29–30
AC Alavarium (Portugal)	51–73 ^{2}	(Poland) Pogoń Baltica Szczecin	26–41	25–32
HC Gomel (Belarus)	62–41 ^{3}	(Croatia) ŽRK Koka	30–18	32–23
Rincón Fertilidad Málaga (Spain)	61–22 ^{4}	(Kosovo) KHF Istogu	40–9	21–13
Dames 1 V&L (Netherlands)	41–50	(Netherlands) Quintus	22–27	19–23
ŽRK Pelister (North Macedonia)	50–67 ^{5}	(Serbia) HC Naisa Niš	26–33	24–34
Rocasa Gran Canaria ACE (Spain)	57–45	(Turkey) Ankara Yenimahalle BSK	33–23	24–22
Fémina Visé (Belgium)	31–52 ^{6}	(Sweden) Kristianstad Handboll	17–27	14–25

Notes

^{1} Both legs were hosted by Maccabi Rishon LeZion.
^{2} Both legs were hosted by AC Alavarium.
^{3} Both legs were hosted by HC Gomel.
^{4} Both legs were hosted by Rincón Fertilidad Málaga.
^{5} Both legs were hosted by HC Naisa Niš.
^{6} Both legs were hosted by Fémina Visé.

=== Matches ===
1 February 2019; 16:00	Maccabi Rishon LeZion (Israel)	26–26	(Sweden) Boden Handboll IF	Beit Maccabi Sport Centre, Rishon LeZion; Attendance: 350; Referees: Weijmans, Wolbertus (NED)
1 February 2019; 16:00	Anastacio 11	(16–16)	Ölén 7	Beit Maccabi Sport Centre, Rishon LeZion; Attendance: 350; Referees: Weijmans, Wolbertus (NED)
1 February 2019; 16:00	1× (yellow card) 4× (suspension)	Report	3× (yellow card) 1× (suspension)	Beit Maccabi Sport Centre, Rishon LeZion; Attendance: 350; Referees: Weijmans, Wolbertus (NED)

2 February 2019; 16:00	Boden Handboll IF (Sweden)	30–29	(Israel) Maccabi Rishon LeZion	Beit Maccabi Sport Centre, Rishon LeZion; Attendance: 1,140; Referees: Weijmans, Wolbertus (NED)
2 February 2019; 16:00	Nordmark 9	(12–14)	Anastacio 11	Beit Maccabi Sport Centre, Rishon LeZion; Attendance: 1,140; Referees: Weijmans, Wolbertus (NED)
2 February 2019; 16:00	2× (yellow card) 2× (suspension)	Report	3× (yellow card) 5× (suspension)	Beit Maccabi Sport Centre, Rishon LeZion; Attendance: 1,140; Referees: Weijmans, Wolbertus (NED)

Boden Handboll IF won 56–55 on aggregate.

2 February 2019; 19:30	AC Alavarium (Portugal)	26–41	(Poland) Pogoń Baltica Szczecin	Pavilhao Alavarium, Aveiro; Attendance: 350; Referees: Jakovljević, Sando (SRB)
2 February 2019; 19:30	Silva 7	(16–23)	Cebula 10	Pavilhao Alavarium, Aveiro; Attendance: 350; Referees: Jakovljević, Sando (SRB)
2 February 2019; 19:30	3× (yellow card) 3× (suspension)	Report	2× (yellow card) 4× (suspension)	Pavilhao Alavarium, Aveiro; Attendance: 350; Referees: Jakovljević, Sando (SRB)

3 February 2019; 19:30	Pogoń Baltica Szczecin (Poland)	32–25	(Portugal) AC Alavarium	Pavilhao Alavarium, Aveiro; Attendance: 300; Referees: Jakovljević, Sando (SRB)
3 February 2019; 19:30	Wołoszyk 7	(14–11)	Silva 10	Pavilhao Alavarium, Aveiro; Attendance: 300; Referees: Jakovljević, Sando (SRB)
3 February 2019; 19:30	2× (yellow card) 6× (suspension) 1× (red card)	Report	2× (yellow card) 6× (suspension)	Pavilhao Alavarium, Aveiro; Attendance: 300; Referees: Jakovljević, Sando (SRB)

Pogoń Baltica Szczecin won 73–51 on aggregate.

2 February 2019; 15:00	HC Gomel (Belarus)	30–18	(Croatia) ŽRK Koka	Sport Palast, Gomel; Attendance: 600; Referees: Rakytina, Tkachuk (UKR)
2 February 2019; 15:00	Golubeva 10	(15–9)	Curic 5	Sport Palast, Gomel; Attendance: 600; Referees: Rakytina, Tkachuk (UKR)
2 February 2019; 15:00	2× (yellow card) 4× (suspension)	Report	3× (yellow card) 4× (suspension)	Sport Palast, Gomel; Attendance: 600; Referees: Rakytina, Tkachuk (UKR)

3 February 2019; 15:00	ŽRK Koka (Croatia)	23–32	(Belarus) HC Gomel	Sport Palast, Gomel; Attendance: 350; Referees: Rakytina, Tkachuk (UKR)
3 February 2019; 15:00	Curic 7	(12–16)	Tryzno 7	Sport Palast, Gomel; Attendance: 350; Referees: Rakytina, Tkachuk (UKR)
3 February 2019; 15:00	2× (yellow card) 6× (suspension) 1× (red card)	Report	3× (yellow card) 6× (suspension)	Sport Palast, Gomel; Attendance: 350; Referees: Rakytina, Tkachuk (UKR)

HC Gomel won 62–41 on aggregate.

2 February 2019; 18:30	Rincón Fertilidad Málaga (Spain)	40–9	(Kosovo) KHF Istogu	Polideportivo el Limon, Alhaurín de la Torre; Attendance: 700; Referees: Beulakker, Gilis (BEL)
2 February 2019; 18:30	S.López 7	(17–4)	Kameri 4	Polideportivo el Limon, Alhaurín de la Torre; Attendance: 700; Referees: Beulakker, Gilis (BEL)
2 February 2019; 18:30	2× (yellow card) 2× (suspension)	Report	2× (yellow card) 4× (suspension)	Polideportivo el Limon, Alhaurín de la Torre; Attendance: 700; Referees: Beulakker, Gilis (BEL)

3 February 2019; 11:00	KHF Istogu (Kosovo)	13–21	(Spain) Rincón Fertilidad Málaga	Polideportivo el Limon, Alhaurín de la Torre; Attendance: 250; Referees: Beulakker, Gilis (BEL)
3 February 2019; 11:00	Kameri 8	(6–11)	Gandulfo 6	Polideportivo el Limon, Alhaurín de la Torre; Attendance: 250; Referees: Beulakker, Gilis (BEL)
3 February 2019; 11:00	2× (yellow card) 7× (suspension) 1× (red card)	Report	1× (yellow card) 4× (suspension)	Polideportivo el Limon, Alhaurín de la Torre; Attendance: 250; Referees: Beulakker, Gilis (BEL)

Rincón Fertilidad Málaga won 61–22 on aggregate.

2 February 2019; 19:30	Dames 1 V&L (Netherlands)	22–27	(Netherlands) Quintus	Glanerbrook, Geleen; Attendance: 500; Referees: Stokes, Bartlett (GBR)
2 February 2019; 19:30	Peeters 6	(13–13)	A.Zwinkels, L.Zwinkels 7	Glanerbrook, Geleen; Attendance: 500; Referees: Stokes, Bartlett (GBR)
2 February 2019; 19:30	1× (yellow card) 2× (suspension)	Report	2× (yellow card) 6× (suspension)	Glanerbrook, Geleen; Attendance: 500; Referees: Stokes, Bartlett (GBR)

9 February 2019; 20:15	Quintus (Netherlands)	23–19	(Netherlands) Dames 1 V&L	Eekhout Hal, Kwintsheul; Attendance: 450; Referees: Korja, Metsämäki (FIN)
9 February 2019; 20:15	Devilee-Grift 5	(11–5)	Janssen 7	Eekhout Hal, Kwintsheul; Attendance: 450; Referees: Korja, Metsämäki (FIN)
9 February 2019; 20:15	1× (yellow card) 6× (suspension)	Report	2× (yellow card) 2× (suspension)	Eekhout Hal, Kwintsheul; Attendance: 450; Referees: Korja, Metsämäki (FIN)

Quintus won 50–41 on aggregate.

2 February 2019; 20:00	Rocasa Gran Canaria ACE (Spain)	33–23	(Turkey) Ankara Yenimahalle BSK	Antonio Moreno, Telde; Attendance: 498; Referees: Jerlecki, Labun (POL)
2 February 2019; 20:00	Lusson 7	(17–15)	Türkoglu 7	Antonio Moreno, Telde; Attendance: 498; Referees: Jerlecki, Labun (POL)
2 February 2019; 20:00	3× (yellow card) 4× (suspension)	Report	3× (yellow card) 8× (suspension)	Antonio Moreno, Telde; Attendance: 498; Referees: Jerlecki, Labun (POL)

10 February 2019; 14:00	Ankara Yenimahalle BSK (Turkey)	22–24	(Spain) Rocasa Gran Canaria ACE	THF Sport Hall, Ankara; Attendance: 300; Referees: Hannes, Hannes (GER)
10 February 2019; 14:00	Sinitsyna 6	(10–10)	Falcón 9	THF Sport Hall, Ankara; Attendance: 300; Referees: Hannes, Hannes (GER)
10 February 2019; 14:00	1× (yellow card) 3× (suspension)	Report	2× (yellow card) 1× (suspension)	THF Sport Hall, Ankara; Attendance: 300; Referees: Hannes, Hannes (GER)

Rocasa Gran Canaria ACE won 57–45 on aggregate.

9 February 2019; 18:30	ŽRK Pelister (North Macedonia)	26–33	(Serbia) HC Naisa Niš	Čair Sports Center, Niš; Attendance: 700; Referees: Aghakishi, Aghakishi (AZE)
9 February 2019; 18:30	Chokeli, Jankulovska 6	(12–13)	Filipović, Pejović 8	Čair Sports Center, Niš; Attendance: 700; Referees: Aghakishi, Aghakishi (AZE)
9 February 2019; 18:30	2× (yellow card) 3× (suspension)	Report	2× (yellow card) 3× (suspension)	Čair Sports Center, Niš; Attendance: 700; Referees: Aghakishi, Aghakishi (AZE)

10 February 2019; 18:30	HC Naisa Niš (Serbia)	34–24	(North Macedonia) ŽRK Pelister	Čair Sports Center, Niš; Attendance: 800; Referees: Aghakishi, Aghakishi (AZE)
10 February 2019; 18:30	Radović, Tanasković 5	(17–12)	Milosavljević 6	Čair Sports Center, Niš; Attendance: 800; Referees: Aghakishi, Aghakishi (AZE)
10 February 2019; 18:30	3× (yellow card) 3× (suspension)	Report	2× (yellow card) 2× (suspension)	Čair Sports Center, Niš; Attendance: 800; Referees: Aghakishi, Aghakishi (AZE)

HC Naisa Niš won 67–50 on aggregate.

9 February 2019; 16:00	Fémina Visé (Belgium)	17–27	(Sweden) Kristianstad Handboll	Hall Omnisport de Visé, Visé; Attendance: 300; Referees: Bytyqi, Kasapi (KOS)
9 February 2019; 16:00	Leonaers 7	(9–9)	Carlström 9	Hall Omnisport de Visé, Visé; Attendance: 300; Referees: Bytyqi, Kasapi (KOS)
9 February 2019; 16:00	2× (yellow card) 2× (suspension)	Report	2× (yellow card) 2× (suspension)	Hall Omnisport de Visé, Visé; Attendance: 300; Referees: Bytyqi, Kasapi (KOS)

10 February 2019; 13:00	Kristianstad Handboll (Sweden)	25–14	(Belgium) Fémina Visé	Hall Omnisport de Visé, Visé; Attendance: 200; Referees: Bytyqi, Kasapi (KOS)
10 February 2019; 13:00	Månsson 5	(17–6)	Leonaers 4	Hall Omnisport de Visé, Visé; Attendance: 200; Referees: Bytyqi, Kasapi (KOS)
10 February 2019; 13:00	1× (yellow card) 7× (suspension)	Report	1× (yellow card) 3× (suspension)	Hall Omnisport de Visé, Visé; Attendance: 200; Referees: Bytyqi, Kasapi (KOS)

Kristianstad Handboll won 52–31 on aggregate.

== Quarterfinals ==
The draw event was held at the EHF Office in Vienna on Tuesday 12 February 2019. The draw determined the quarter-final and also the semi-final pairings. Teams listed first will play the first leg at home. For the quarter-finals, there will be no seeding as all eight teams will be drawn from the same pot one after another. There will also be no country protection applied in the draw. The semi-final draw followed using the quarter-final pairings.

The first legs were played on 2–3 March and the second legs were played on 9–10 March 2019. Some teams agreed to play both matches in the same venue.

Team 1	Agg.	Team 2	1st leg	2nd leg
HC Naisa Niš (Serbia)	52–58 ^{1}	(Sweden) Kristianstad Handboll	25–35	27–23
Rincón Fertilidad Málaga (Spain)	57–63	(Netherlands) Quintus	26–29	31–34
Rocasa Gran Canaria ACE (Spain)	45–44	(Belarus) HC Gomel	24–18	21–26
Pogoń Baltica Szczecin (Poland)	55–49 ^{2}	(Sweden) Boden Handboll IF	28–22	27–27

Notes

^{1} Both legs were hosted by Kristianstad Handboll.
^{2} Both legs were hosted by Boden Handboll IF.

=== Matches ===
2 March 2019; 13:30	Pogoń Baltica Szczecin (Poland)	28–22	(Sweden) Boden Handboll IF	Boden Arena, Boden; Attendance: 287; Referees: Beqiri, Krasniqi (KOS)
2 March 2019; 13:30	Płomińska 7	(14–13)	Nordmark 5	Boden Arena, Boden; Attendance: 287; Referees: Beqiri, Krasniqi (KOS)
2 March 2019; 13:30	3× (yellow card) 4× (suspension)	Report	3× (yellow card) 3× (suspension)	Boden Arena, Boden; Attendance: 287; Referees: Beqiri, Krasniqi (KOS)

3 March 2019; 15:00	Boden Handboll IF (Sweden)	27–27	(Poland) Pogoń Baltica Szczecin	Boden Arena, Boden; Attendance: 246; Referees: Beqiri, Krasniqi (KOS)
3 March 2019; 15:00	Masna 7	(13–13)	Cebula 7	Boden Arena, Boden; Attendance: 246; Referees: Beqiri, Krasniqi (KOS)
3 March 2019; 15:00	3× (yellow card) 5× (suspension)	Report	3× (yellow card) 9× (suspension)	Boden Arena, Boden; Attendance: 246; Referees: Beqiri, Krasniqi (KOS)

Pogoń Baltica Szczecin won 55–49 on aggregate.

2 March 2019; 20:00	Rocasa Gran Canaria ACE (Spain)	24–18	(Belarus) HC Gomel	Antonio Moreno, Telde; Attendance: 520; Referees: Lončar, Lončar (CRO)
2 March 2019; 20:00	Lusson 5	(12–10)	Golubeva 6	Antonio Moreno, Telde; Attendance: 520; Referees: Lončar, Lončar (CRO)
2 March 2019; 20:00	2× (yellow card)	Report	3× (yellow card) 5× (suspension)	Antonio Moreno, Telde; Attendance: 520; Referees: Lončar, Lončar (CRO)

9 March 2019
18:00
HC Gomel (Belarus)
26–21
(Spain) Rocasa Gran Canaria ACE
Sport Palast, Gomel
Attendance: 850
Referees: Korja, Metsämäki (FIN)
Golubeva 8
(11–12)
H. Rodríguez, S. Rodríguez 5
3× (yellow card) 4× (suspension)
Report
1× (yellow card) 1× (suspension)

FT: 24–18 Pen: 2–3

Rocasa Gran Canaria ACE won 45–44 on aggregate.

2 March 2019; 18:00	Rincón Fertilidad Málaga (Spain)	26–29	(Netherlands) Quintus	Polideportivo el Limon, Alhaurín de la Torre; Attendance: 750; Referees: Braseth, Sundet (NOR)
2 March 2019; 18:00	S. López 13	(16–14)	Van Steekelenburg 9	Polideportivo el Limon, Alhaurín de la Torre; Attendance: 750; Referees: Braseth, Sundet (NOR)
2 March 2019; 18:00	3× (yellow card) 2× (suspension)	Report	2× (yellow card) 3× (suspension)	Polideportivo el Limon, Alhaurín de la Torre; Attendance: 750; Referees: Braseth, Sundet (NOR)

10 March 2019; 16:00	Quintus (Netherlands)	34–31	(Spain) Rincón Fertilidad Málaga	Eekhout Hal, Kwintsheul; Attendance: 800; Referees: Rauchs, Linster (LUX)
10 March 2019; 16:00	L. Zwinkels 9	(16–14)	S. López 8	Eekhout Hal, Kwintsheul; Attendance: 800; Referees: Rauchs, Linster (LUX)
10 March 2019; 16:00	3× (yellow card) 6× (suspension) 1× (red card)	Report	2× (yellow card) 2× (suspension)	Eekhout Hal, Kwintsheul; Attendance: 800; Referees: Rauchs, Linster (LUX)

Quintus won 63–57 on aggregate.

9 March 2019; 16:00	HC Naisa Niš (Serbia)	25–35	(Sweden) Kristianstad Handboll	Kristianstad Arena, Kristianstad; Attendance: 148; Referees: Duplii, Pobedrina (UKR)
9 March 2019; 16:00	Pejović 12	(15–14)	Carlström 11	Kristianstad Arena, Kristianstad; Attendance: 148; Referees: Duplii, Pobedrina (UKR)
9 March 2019; 16:00	3× (yellow card) 3× (suspension)	Report	2× (yellow card) 2× (suspension)	Kristianstad Arena, Kristianstad; Attendance: 148; Referees: Duplii, Pobedrina (UKR)

10 March 2019; 15:00	Kristianstad Handboll (Sweden)	23–27	(Serbia) HC Naisa Niš	Kristianstad Arena, Kristianstad; Attendance: 162; Referees: Duplii, Pobedrina (UKR)
10 March 2019; 15:00	Birberg, Carlström 4	(13–11)	Pejović 6	Kristianstad Arena, Kristianstad; Attendance: 162; Referees: Duplii, Pobedrina (UKR)
10 March 2019; 15:00	3× (yellow card) 4× (suspension)	Report	2× (yellow card) 3× (suspension)	Kristianstad Arena, Kristianstad; Attendance: 162; Referees: Duplii, Pobedrina (UKR)

Kristianstad Handboll won 58–52 on aggregate.

== Semifinals ==
The first legs were played on 6–7 April and the second legs were played on 13–14 April 2019.

Team 1	Agg.	Team 2	1st leg	2nd leg
Quintus (Netherlands)	43–57	(Poland) Pogoń Baltica Szczecin	21–25	22–32
Rocasa Gran Canaria ACE (Spain)	53–37	(Sweden) Kristianstad Handboll	22–17	31–20

=== Matches ===
7 April 2019; 16:00	Quintus (Netherlands)	21–25	(Poland) Pogoń Baltica Szczecin	Eekhout Hal, Kwintsheul; Attendance: 830; Referees: Argyridis, Mouttas (CYP)
7 April 2019; 16:00	Hage 10	(12–13)	Kochaniak 5	Eekhout Hal, Kwintsheul; Attendance: 830; Referees: Argyridis, Mouttas (CYP)
7 April 2019; 16:00	2× (yellow card) 5× (suspension)	Report	1× (yellow card) 4× (suspension)	Eekhout Hal, Kwintsheul; Attendance: 830; Referees: Argyridis, Mouttas (CYP)

13 April 2019; 17:00	Pogoń Baltica Szczecin (Poland)	32–22	(Netherlands) Quintus	Hala Miejska, Szczecin; Attendance: 600; Referees: Čerņavskis, Bogdanovs (LAT)
13 April 2019; 17:00	Płomińska 6	(14–13)	Hage 8	Hala Miejska, Szczecin; Attendance: 600; Referees: Čerņavskis, Bogdanovs (LAT)
13 April 2019; 17:00	3× (yellow card) 3× (suspension)	Report	2× (yellow card) 4× (suspension)	Hala Miejska, Szczecin; Attendance: 600; Referees: Čerņavskis, Bogdanovs (LAT)

Pogoń Baltica Szczecin won 57–43 on aggregate.

7 April 2019; 13:00	Rocasa Gran Canaria ACE (Spain)	22–17	(Sweden) Kristianstad Handboll	Antonio Moreno, Telde; Attendance: 600; Referees: Stokes, Bartlett (GBR)
7 April 2019; 13:00	H. Rodríguez 6	(11–10)	Carlström 5	Antonio Moreno, Telde; Attendance: 600; Referees: Stokes, Bartlett (GBR)
7 April 2019; 13:00	3× (yellow card)	Report	3× (yellow card) 4× (suspension)	Antonio Moreno, Telde; Attendance: 600; Referees: Stokes, Bartlett (GBR)

13 April 2019; 16:00	Kristianstad Handboll (Sweden)	20–31	(Spain) Rocasa Gran Canaria ACE	Kristianstad Arena, Kristianstad; Attendance: 154; Referees: Christidi, Papamattheou (GRE)
13 April 2019; 16:00	Carlström 6	(11–17)	H. Rodríguez 10	Kristianstad Arena, Kristianstad; Attendance: 154; Referees: Christidi, Papamattheou (GRE)
13 April 2019; 16:00	3× (yellow card) 4× (suspension)	Report	3× (yellow card) 3× (suspension)	Kristianstad Arena, Kristianstad; Attendance: 154; Referees: Christidi, Papamattheou (GRE)

Rocasa Gran Canaria ACE won 53–37 on aggregate.

== Final ==
The first leg was played on 4–5 May and the second legs was played on 11–12 May 2019. The final home rights draw was held on 16 April 2019 in Vienna.

Team 1	Agg.	Team 2	1st leg	2nd leg
Pogoń Baltica Szczecin (Poland)	47–53	(Spain) Rocasa Gran Canaria ACE	23–30	24–23

=== Matches ===
5 May 2019; 18:00	Pogoń Baltica Szczecin (Poland)	23–30	(Spain) Rocasa Gran Canaria ACE	Azoty Arena, Szczecin; Attendance: 1,600; Referees: Bennani, Bennani (SWE)
5 May 2019; 18:00	four players four	(12–17)	Lusson, H. Rodríguez 7	Azoty Arena, Szczecin; Attendance: 1,600; Referees: Bennani, Bennani (SWE)
5 May 2019; 18:00	2× (yellow card) 3× (suspension)	Report	1× (yellow card) 4× (suspension)	Azoty Arena, Szczecin; Attendance: 1,600; Referees: Bennani, Bennani (SWE)

12 May 2019; 13:00	Rocasa Gran Canaria ACE (Spain)	23–24	(Poland) Pogoń Baltica Szczecin	Pabellón Insular Rita Hernandez, Telde; Attendance: 1,500; Referees: Bonifert, Oláh (HUN)
12 May 2019; 13:00	Falcón 6	(15–12)	Cebula, Zawistowska 5	Pabellón Insular Rita Hernandez, Telde; Attendance: 1,500; Referees: Bonifert, Oláh (HUN)
12 May 2019; 13:00	1× (yellow card) 5× (suspension)	Report	3× (yellow card) 5× (suspension) 1× (red card)	Pabellón Insular Rita Hernandez, Telde; Attendance: 1,500; Referees: Bonifert, Oláh (HUN)

Rocasa Gran Canaria ACE won 53–47 on aggregate.

== Top goalscorers ==
Rank	Player	Club	Goals
1	(Poland) Agata Cebula	(Poland) Pogoń Baltica Szczecin	42
1	(Spain) Haridian Rodríguez	(Spain) Rocasa Gran Canaria ACE	42
3	(Sweden) Sara Carlström	(Sweden) Kristianstad Handboll	39

== See also ==
- 2018–19 Women's EHF Champions League
- 2018–19 Women's EHF Cup
