= Olha Vashchuk =

Ukrainian-Turkish handball player (born 1987)

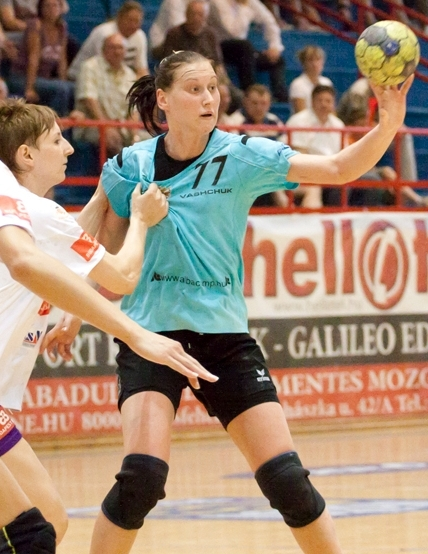
- Vashchuk in 2011

Personal information
- Full name: Olha Vashchuk
- Nationality: Ukrainian
- Born: 13 August 1987 (age 39) Zaporizhzhia, Ukraine
- Height: 1.79 m (5 ft 10 1/2 in)

Sport
- Sport: Handball
- Position: Right back
- Current club: Kastamonu Bld. GSK (women's handball)
- Number: 99

Senior clubs
- Years: Team
- 2003–2005: HC Motor Zaporizhzhia
- 2005–2009: SC Galytchanka Lviv
- 2009–2010: CS Oltchim Râmnicu Vâlcea
- 2010–2011: Fehérvár KC
- 2011–2012: Rostov-Don
- 2012–2013: ŽRK Metalurg
- 2013-?: Ardeşen GSK
- ?-2020: Kastamonu Bld. GSK (women's handball)
- 2020: Fehérvár KC
National team
Years	Team	Apps	(Gls)
–	Ukraine	91	(38)
- Updated on 8 December 2012

Olha Vashchuk (born Ukrainian: Ольга Ващук; 13 August 1987) is a Ukrainian (until 2014) and Turkish (since 2014) handballer playing for the Turkish club Ardeşen GSK in right back position. She played for Ukrainian national team (until 2014).

Formerly, she was with the Macedonian team ŽRK Metalurg.

- Championship of Macedonia (North Macedonia)

Winners Gold: 2012

- Macedonian Cup (North Macedonia)

Winners Gold : 2012, 2013
