= Sara Ristovska =

Macedonian handball player

Personal information
- Full name: Sara Ristovska
- Nationality: Macedonian
- Born: 9 September 1996 (age 30) Skopje, Macedonia
- Height: 1.69 m (5 ft 7 in)

Sport
- Sport: Handball
- Position: Right Wing
- Current club: CS Rapid București
- Number: 91

Senior clubs
- Years: Team
- –2015: ŽRK Metalurg
- 2015–2018: ŽRK Vardar
- 2018–2019: RK Krim
- 2019–2024: CSKA Moscow
- 2024–: CS Rapid București
National team
Years	Team	Apps	(Gls)
2015	North Macedonia	56	(272)
- Updated on 12 November 2024

Sara Ristovska (Macedonian: Сара Ристовска) (born 9 September 1996) is a Macedonian handball player who plays for Romanian club CS Rapid București and the North Macedonia national handball team.

She represented the North Macedonia at the 2022 European Women's Handball Championship.

== Accomplishments ==
ŽRK Vardar

=== Domestic competitions (North Macedonia) ===
- Macedonian First League:

Winner (3): 2015–16, 2016–17, 2017–18

- Macedonian Cup

Winners (3): 2016, 2017, 2018

=== European competitions (European Union) ===
- EHF Champions League:

Runner-up: 2016–17, 2017–18
Third placed: 2015–16

=== Other competitions ===
- Women's Regional Handball League:

Winner: 2016–17, 2017–18

- Bucharest Trophy:

Third placed: 2015

- Vardar Trophy:

Winners: 2015
Runner-up: 2017
