= Barbara Lazović =

Slovenian handball player

Personal information
- Nationality: Slovenian
- Born: 4 January 1988 (age 38) Brežice, SFR Yugoslavia
- Height: 1.83 m (6 ft 0 in)

Sport
- Sport: Handball
- Position: Right back

Senior clubs
- Years: Team
- 2006–2007: ŽRK Brežice
- 2007–2009: RK Krim
- 2009–2010: ŽRK Zaječar
- 2010–2014: RK Krim
- 2014–2018: ŽRK Vardar
- 2018–2019: CSM București
- 2019–2020: Budućnost Podgorica
- 2020–2022: CSM București
- 2022–2024: RK Krim
National team
Years	Team	Apps	(Gls)
2008–2024	Slovenia	112	(328)
Medal record
Women's handball
Representing Slovenia
Mediterranean Games
Silver medal – second place	2013 Mersin	Team

Barbara Lazović (née Varlec; born 4 January 1988) is a former Slovenian handball player who played as a right back for the Slovenian national team. Throughout her career, she played for various European top tiers, including CSM București, ŽRK Budućnost, ŽRK Vardar and RK Krim.

== Honours ==
- ZRK Vardar (North Macedonia)
- Macedonian First League:

Winners (4): 2014–15, 2015–16, 2016–17, 2017–18

- Macedonian Cup

Winners (4): 2015, 2016, 2017, 2018

== European competitions (European Union) ==
- EHF Champions League:

Runner-up: 2016–17, 2017–18
Third placed: 2014–15, 2015–16

== Other competitions ==
- Women's Regional Handball League:

Winners: 2016–17, 2017–18

- Bucharest Trophy:

Third placed: 2015

- Vardar Trophy:

Winners: 2015
Runner-up: 2017

== Individual awards ==
- All-Star Right Back of the Romanian League: 2021

== Personal life ==
She is married to the Montenegrin international Vuk Lazović.
