= Tatyana Khmyrova =

Russian handball player (born 1990)

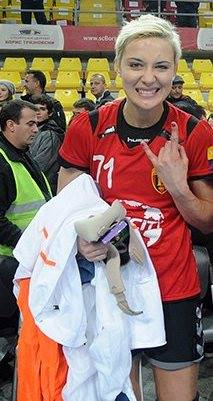

Personal information
- Full name: Tatyana Yevgenyevna Khmyrova
- Nationality: Russian
- Born: 6 February 1990 (age 36) Volgograd, Russian SFSR, Soviet Union
- Height: 1.78 m (5 ft 10 in)

Sport
- Sport: Handball
- Position: Centre back

Senior clubs
- Years: Team
- 2005–2013: Dinamo Volgograd
- 2013–2018: HC Vardar
- 2018–2019: Siófok KC
- 2020–2021: Balonmano Salud Tenerife
- 2022–: O.F.N. Ionias
National team
Years	Team	Apps	(Gls)
2008–2019	Russia	58	(182)
Medal record
World Championship
Gold medal – first place	2009 China
European Championship
Bronze medal – third place	2008 Macedonia

Tatyana Yevgenyevna Khmyrova (Russian: Татьяна Евгеньевна Хмырова; born 6 February 1990) is a Russian handballer.

== National team ==
She played for the Russian national team since the younger age categories and won the Youth World Championship in 2008. In addition, she was named the MVP of the tournament. Khmyrova made her senior debut in the same year at the 2008 European Championship, where she collected the bronze medal. In the following year at the World Championship, Tatyana was part of the gold medal winning team, and participated at the European Championship in 2010, finishing seventh. She competed at the 2011 World Women's Handball Championship in Brazil, where the Russian team placed 6th, and the 2012 Summer Olympics, where Russian finished 8th.

== Club career ==
Khmyrova played first for HC Dinamo Volgograd from 2005, where she made her debut at the age of 16. In 2009, 2010, 2011, 2012 and 2013 she won the Russian Championship.

In 2013 she joined Macedonian HC Vardar, where she won the Macedonian Championship and Cup double five times in a row from 2014 to 2018.

Afterwards she joined Hungarian Siófok KC. In her first season at the club, she won the EHF Cup. Due to knee injuries, she took a break from handball in 2019.

For the 2020-21 season she joined Spanish side Balonmano Salud Tenerife. She left the team in 2021, when the club had economic trouble and therefore could not pay wages on time. Afterwards she joined the coaching staff of her former club HC Vardar. In 2022 she joined Greek team O.F.N. Ionias.

== Achievements ==
=== Club ===
- Russian Championship:
  - Winner: 2009, 2010, 2011, 2012, 2013
- EHF Cup:
  - Winner: 2008, 2019
- Macedonian Championship:
  - Winner: 2014, 2015, 2016, 2017, 2018
- Macedonian Cup:
  - Winner: 2014, 2015, 2016, 2017, 2018

=== National team ===
- World Championship:
  - Winner: 2009
- European Championship:
  - Bronze Medalist: 2008
- Youth World Championship:
  - Winner: 2008

== Awards and recognition ==
- Most Valuable Player of the Youth World Championship: 2008
