= Biljana Crvenkoska =

Macedonian handball player

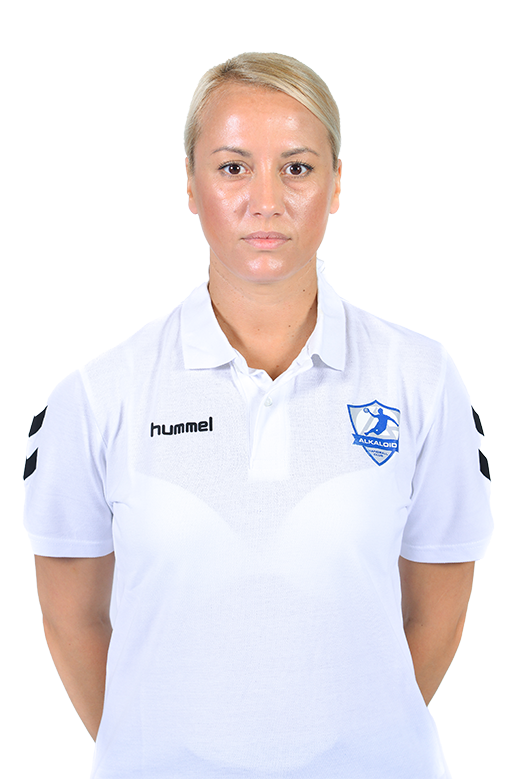

Personal information
- Full name: Biljana Crvenkoska
- Nationality: Macedonian
- Born: 6 September 1983 (age 43) Skopje, Macedonia, Yugoslavia
- Height: 1.69 m (5 ft 7 in)

Sport
- Sport: Handball
- Position: Center back

Senior clubs
- Years: Team
- 2001–2008: Kometal Gjorche Petrov
- 2008–2009: Üsküdar BSK
- 2009–2012: Jomi Salerno
- 2012–2019: ŽRK Vardar
National team
Years	Team	Apps	(Gls)
?	Macedonia	69	(75)

Teams managed
- 2021–: RK Alkaloid

Biljana Crvenkoska (Macedonian: Билјана Црвенкоска, born 6 September 1983) is a Macedonian retired handball player. Since 2018, she is a handball coach and worked as assistant in several clubs. Currently, she is an assistant coach at HC Alkaloid Skopje.

== Honours ==
Kometal Gjorche Petrov

- Macedonian (North Macedonia)
- Championship of Macedonia:

Gold (8): 2002, 2003, 2004, 2005, 2006, 2007, 2008, 2009

- Macedonian Cup:

Gold (8): 2002, 2003, 2004, 2005, 2006, 2007, 2008, 2009

- European (European Union)
- Champions League:

Gold (1): 2002
Silver (1): 2005

- Champions Trophy:

Gold (1): 2002
Bronze (1) : 2004

ŽRK Vardar

- Macedonian First League:

Winners (6): 2012–13, 2013–14, 2014–15, 2015–16, 2016–17, 2017–18

- Macedonian Cup

Winners (5): 2014, 2015, 2016, 2017, 2018

== European competitions (European Union) ==
- EHF Champions League:

Runner-up: 2016–17, 2017–18
Third place: 2013–14, 2014–15, 2015–16

== Other competitions ==
- Women's Regional Handball League:

Winners: 2016–17, 2017–18
Runner-up: 2013–14

- Bucharest Trophy:

Third place: 2015

- Vardar Trophy:

Winners: 2015
Runner-up: 2017
