= Dragana Pecevska =

Macedonian handball player

Dragana Pecevska-Ristova
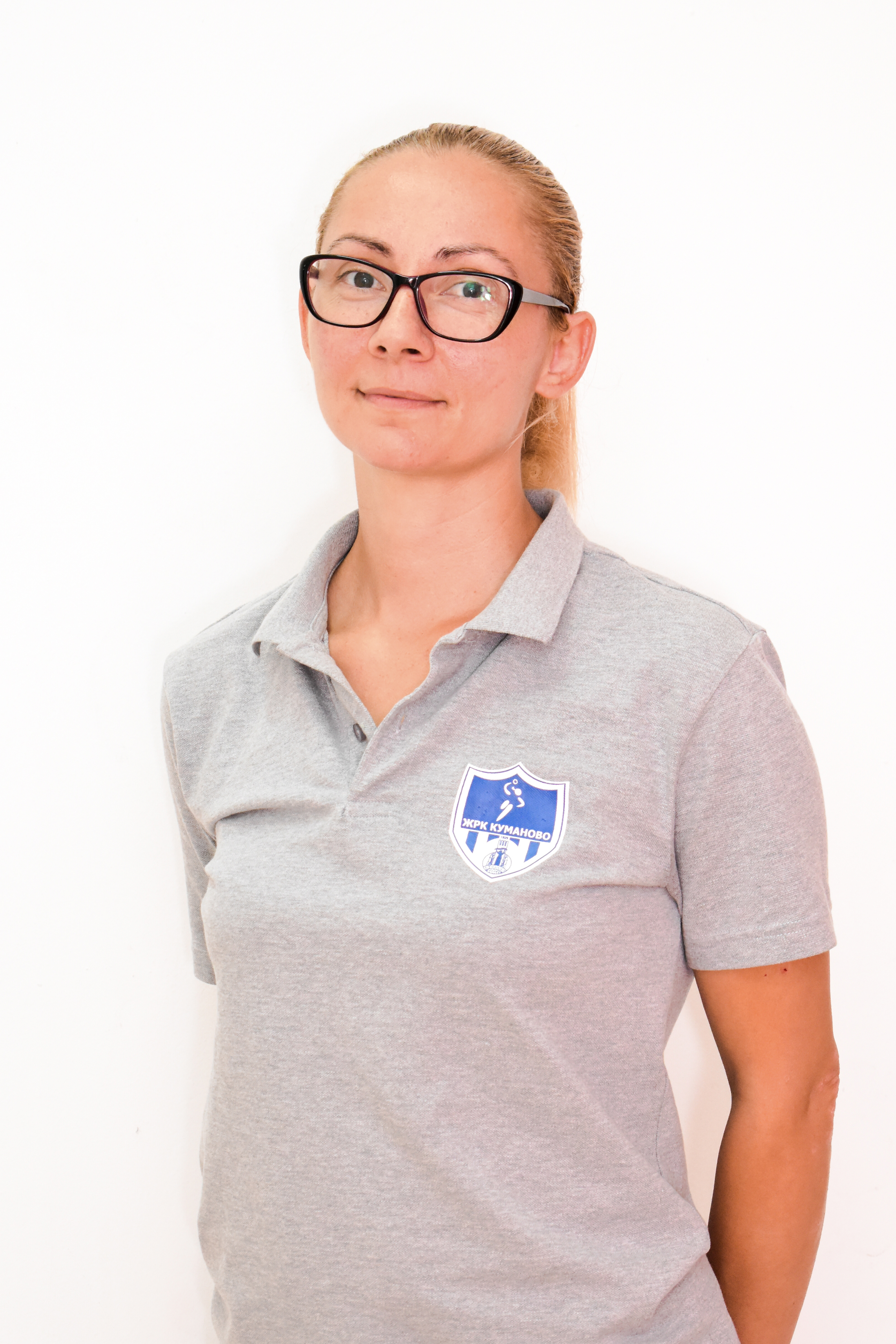

Personal information
- Full name: Dragana Pecevska-Ristova
- Nationality: Macedonian
- Born: 11 April 1983 (age 43) Skopje, SR Macedonia, SFR Yugoslavia
- Height: 1.70 m (5 ft 7 in)

Sport
- Sport: Handball
- Position: Left Wing
- Current club: Retired
- Number: 17

Senior clubs
- Years: Team
- 2001-2002: RK Skopje
- 2002-2003: Kometal Gjorče Petrov
- 2003-2004: Eurostandard Gjorče Petrov
- 2004-2009: Kometal Gjorče Petrov
- 2009-2011: ŽRK Budućnost
- 2011-2013: ŽRK Metalurg
- 2013-2014: ŽRK Vardar
National team
Years	Team	Apps	(Gls)
–	Macedonia	60	(125)
- –: HC Vardar
- Updated on 12 October 2019

Dragana Ristova, née Pecevska (Macedonian: Драгана Ристова, née Пецевска; born 11 April 1983) is a retired Macedonian handball player who plays for ŽRK Metalurg and for the North Macedonia women's national handball team.

She plays on the position left wing.

In the season 2009/10 with ŽRK Budućnost, she won the EHF Women's Cup Winners' Cup.
