= ŽRK Pelister =

Macedonian women's handball club

ЖРК Пелистер 2012 WHC Pelister 2012
- Full name: Женски ракометен клуб Пелистер 2012 (Ženski rakometen klub Pelister 2012)
- Arena: Sports Hall Mladost
- Capacity: 5,000
- President: Jovan Vasilev
- Head coach: Kire Mitrevski
- League: Skopsko Super League
- 2021-2022: 8th
Home	Away

ŽRK Pelister 2012 (WHC Pelister 2012) (Macedonian: ЖРК Пелистер 2012) is a Macedonian women's handball club from Bitola, North Macedonia. The team was rebuilt after 15 years in 2014-15 season. The team currently competes in the Macedonian women's First League of Handball. ŽRK Pelister 2012 has participated twice in the EHF Challenge Cup.

== Champions ==
- 1984

== CHURLEVSKI Arena ==
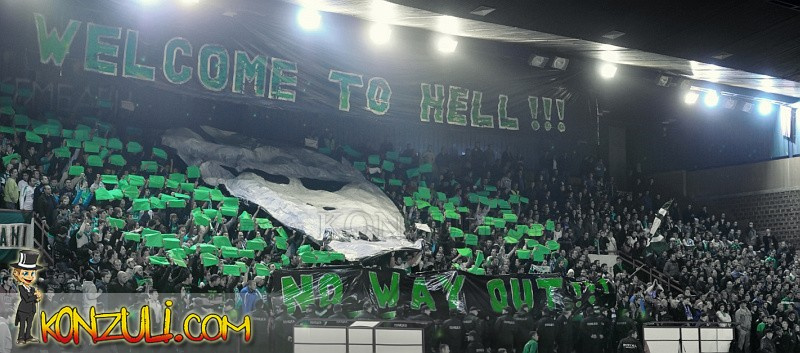
Arena Churlevski

Sports hall "Mladost" (Macedonian: Спортска сала „Младост“) is a multi-purpose sports arena located in Bitola, North Macedonia. It was built in 1975 by the citizens of Bitola and is mainly used for handball by RK Pelister and RK Bitola, and for basketball by KK Pelister. There is also room for bowling and table tennis plus it has been used for concerts. The Arena hosted the 2007 Macedonian Basketball Cup. This sports hall was the largest on the territory of North Macedonia before the construction of the Boris Trajkovski Sports Center in Skopje.

On 21 July 2009, the arena is undergoing renovation. A new parquet floor will be installed along with new seats. The locker rooms will also be updated to meet EHF standards. Total cost of the project is about €30,000.

In January 2017, renovation of interior of the hall started. The renovation covered the floor, the stands, a new score board and a new heating system. The first match in the renovated arena was played on April 6, 2017 with the match between RK Pelister and RK Metalurg in the second round of the handball Super League play-off.

At the end of July 2018, the name of the hall was changed to "Boro Churlevski", in honor of the late Boro Churlevski, a former handball player from Bitola.Churlevski Arena has a capacity of 3.700 sits.

== European record ==
Season	Competition	Round	Club	1st leg	2nd leg	Aggregate
2015–16	EHF Challenge Cup	R3	(Kosovo) KHF Shqiponja	22–38	39–35	57–77
2018–19	EHF Challenge Cup	R3	(Malta) La Salle HC	20–27	24–30	44–57
2018–19	EHF Challenge Cup	L16	(Serbia) HC Naisa Niš	26–33	24–34	50–67

== Team ==
=== Current squad ===
Squad for the 2018–19 season

Goalkeepers

- (North Macedonia) Ivana Bogoevska
- (North Macedonia) Slobodanka Kiceska
- (North Macedonia) Jovana Ristova

Wingers
RW

- (North Macedonia) Monika Bosilkovska
- (North Macedonia) Dominika Nikoloska

LW

- (North Macedonia) Kristina Naumovska
- (North Macedonia) Sara Ilievska

Line Players

- (North Macedonia) Anastasija Kajcevska
- (North Macedonia) Natalija Diskovska

Back players
LB

- (North Macedonia) Angela Jankulovska
- (North Macedonia) Arijona Raif

CB

- (North Macedonia) Frosina Apostolovska
- (North Macedonia) Iva Bozhinoska

RB

- (North Macedonia) Sabina Etemovska
- (North Macedonia) Sara Rujanovska

=== Transfers ===
Transfers for the 2018–19 season

Joining

- (North Macedonia) Anastasija Nikolovska (LW) (from (North Macedonia) HC Vardar)
- (North Macedonia) Iva Bozhinoska (CB) (from (North Macedonia) HC Vardar)

Leaving

- (North Macedonia) Gabriela Velickovska (LB) (to (France) Le Pouzin Handball 07)
- (North Macedonia) Vaska Gligorijadis (RW) (to (North Macedonia) ŽRK Kumanovo)
