= Angela Jankulovska =

Macedonian female handballer

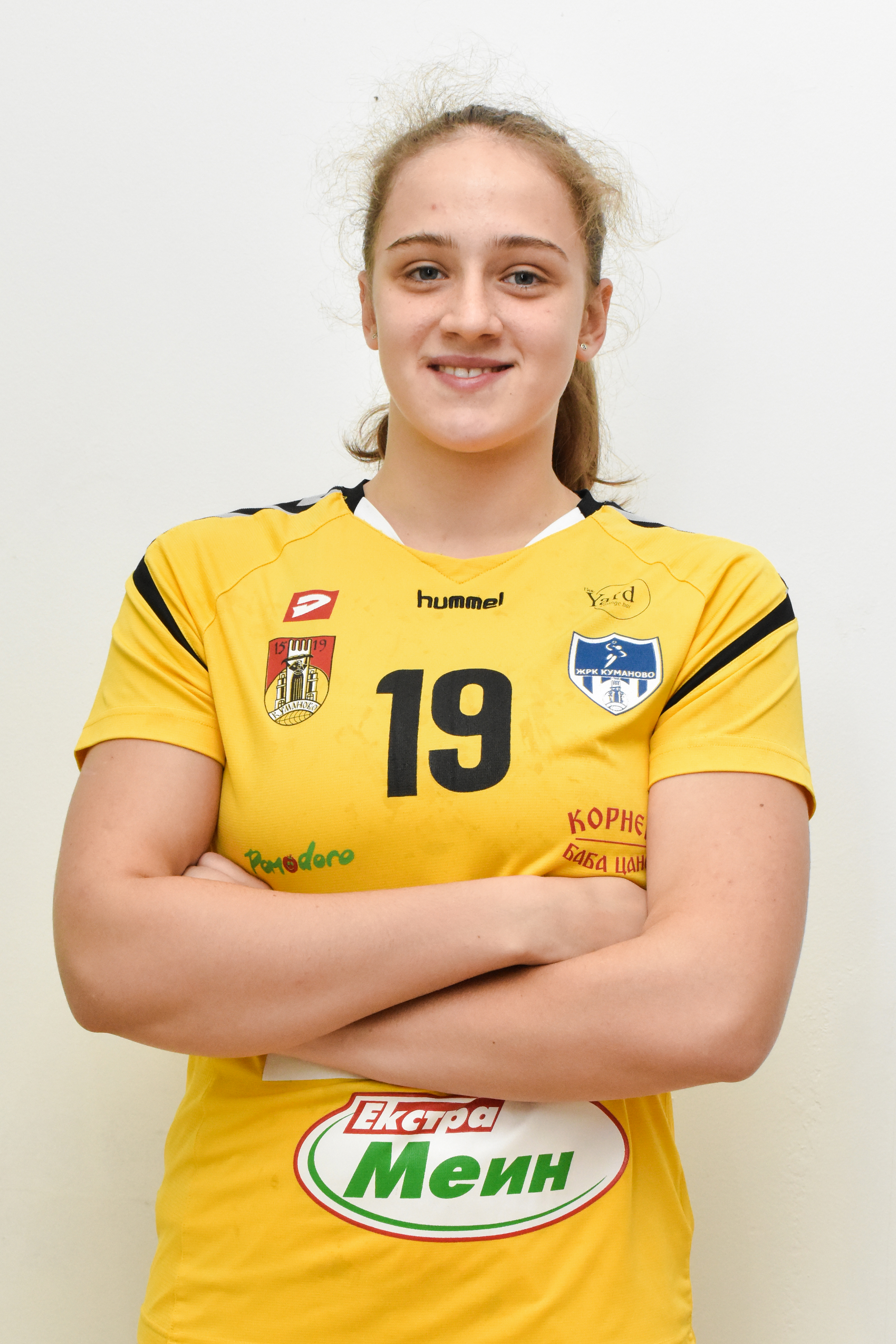

Personal information
- Nationality: North Macedonia
- Born: 27 July 2002 (age 24) Bitola, Macedonia
- Height: 1.77 m (5 ft 10 in)

Sport
- Sport: Handball
- Position: Left back
- Current club: WHC Gjorche Petrov
- Number: 23

Senior clubs
- Years: Team
- 2018–2019: ŽRK Pelister
- 2019–2021: ŽRK Kumanovo
- 2021–: WHC Gjorche Petrov
National team
| Years | Team | Apps | (Gls) |
| 2019– | North Macedonia | 20 | (27) |

Angela Jankulovska (born 27 July 2002) is a North Macedonia female handballer for WHC Gjorche Petrov and the North Macedonia national team.

She represented the North Macedonia at the 2022 European Women's Handball Championship.
