= Marija Petrović (handballer) =

Serbian handball player (born 1994)

Personal information
- Nationality: Serbian
- Born: 18 March 1994 (age 32) Niš, FR Yugoslavia
- Height: 1.85 m (6 ft 1 in)

Sport
- Sport: Handball
- Position: Pivot
- Current club: Gloria Buzău

Senior clubs
- Years: Team
- –2015: HC Naisa Niš
- 2015–2017: ŽRK Izvor
- 2017–2018: ŽRK Vardar
- 2018–2019: SCM Râmnicu Vâlcea
- 2019–: Gloria Buzău
National team
- Years: Team
- –: Serbia
Medal record
Summer Universiade
Bronze medal – third place	2015 Gwangju	Team

Marija Petrović (Serbian Cyrillic: Марија Петровић; born 18 March 1994) is a Serbian handball player who plays for Gloria Buzău.

== International honours ==
- EHF Champions League:
  - Finalist: 2017, 2018
