= Maja Sokač =

Croatian handball player (born 1982)

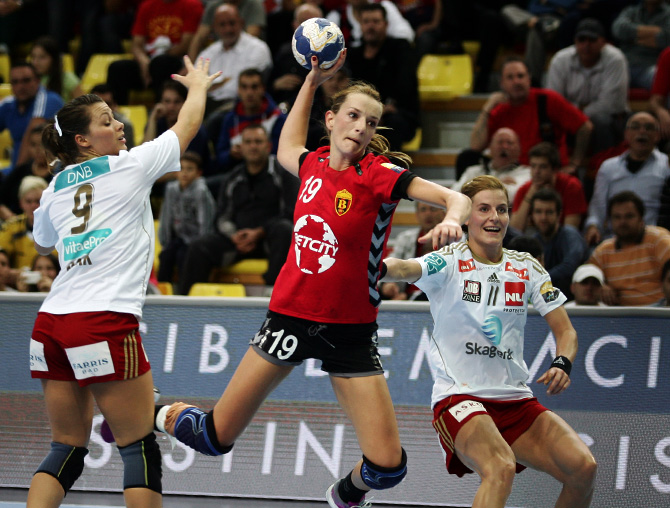

Personal information
- Nationality: Croatian
- Born: 31 May 1982 (age 44) Split, SR Croatia, SFR Yugoslavia
- Height: 1.78 m (5 ft 10 in)

Sport
- Sport: Handball
- Position: Left wing

Senior clubs
- Years: Team
- 1996–2004: Split Kaltenberg
- 2004: ŽRK Lokomotiva
- 2004–2011: Podravka
- 2011–2012: SD Itxako
- 2012–2014: RK Zaječar
- 2014–2016: ŽRK Vardar
- 2016–2017: Ankara Yenimahalle
National team
Years	Team	Apps	(Gls)
–	Croatia	159	(428)

Maja Sokač (née Zebić; born 31 May 1982) is a retired Croatian handballer who was played in the left wing position for the Croatian national team and her last club was Ankara Yenimahalle.

== Club career ==
Sokač started to play handball in Croatian club Sinj. In 1996, she joined senior team of Split Kaltenberg who competed in first Croatian league. In 2004, she joined Lokomotiva Zagreb, and same season she transferred to Podravka Vegeta. Besides winning many Croatian Championship and Croatian Cup trophies, she played in Cup Winners' Cup finals in 2005 and EHF Cup finals in 2006. In Champions League she played 44 matches and scored 131 goals. In the 2011/2012 season Sokač played for Spanish Champions and Champions League runners-up SD Itxako.

== Trophies ==
- Spanish Supercup
  - Gold: 2008/2009
- Women's Regional Handball League
  - Gold: 2008/2009
  - Silver: 2009/2010, 2010/2011
- Croatian Championship
  - Gold: 2004/2005, 2005/2006, 2006/2007, 2007/2008, 2008/2009, 2009/2010 and 2010/2011
- Croatian Cup
  - Gold: 2004/2005, 2005/2006, 2006/2007, 2007/2008, 2008/2009, 2009/2010 and 2010/2011
