= ŽRK Vardar =

Macedonian handball club

ЖРК Вардар WHC Vardar
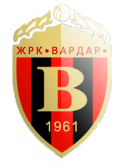
- Full name: Женски ракометен клуб Вардар Скопје (Ženski rakometen klub Vardar Skopje)
- Founded: 1961
- Arena: Jane Sandanski Arena
- Capacity: 6,000
- President: Gordana Naceva
- Head coach: Indira Kastratović
- League: Skopsko Super League
- 2021-22: 4th
- Club colours
Home	Away

ŽRK Vardar (Macedonian: ЖРК Вардар) is a Macedonian women's handball club from Skopje, North Macedonia. The team currently competes in the Macedonian women's First League of Handball, Women's Regional Handball League and used to be a top competitor in the Women's EHF Champions League.

== History ==
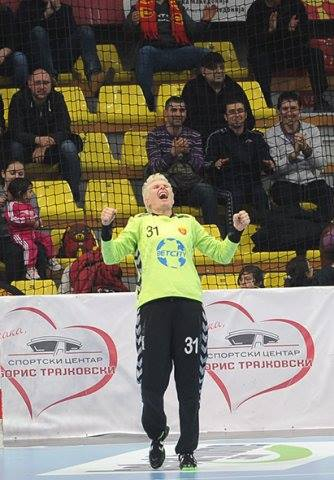
Legendary Goal Keeper Inna Suslina Champion league match 2014

- The Beginning

WHC Vardar was founded in 1961, as part of the Vardar Sports Club in Skopje, which had been founded in 1947.

WHC Grafichar Skopje club was established in 1948, and it was the top quality team at the time. They won many titles including the last one in 1960 before the fusion. In 1961 Grafichar renamed itself to Vardar and almost the entire team of the club Grafichar joined the team. WHC Vardar started with winning the championship in 1961. The next few seasons they played in a higher rank including playoffs for the Federal First Division. In 1963 after the earthquake, the Vardar team was dismissed and they didn't compete for many seasons until 1970. Most of the players joined HC Rabotnicki and Metalurg Skopje.

- New Come Back

In the year 1970 after the financial situation got better they started to compete in Macedonian league again. They won 4 championships in a row from 1971 until 1974 and played qualification for the higher rank Federal Division. They didn't manage to get to higher rank losing tight barrage games with 1 or 2 goals difference in aggregate. In 1976 and 1977 they won the Macedonian championship again and next year they qualified for the second Division Federal League. They won the Second Division in 1978 and reached the play-offs for top flight federal division, but lost in aggregate 1 goal difference. In the next years they got back in the Macedonian league again. They won the title in 1983 .They played in the Macedonian league until 1992. After 1992 Macedonian league became the top flight league where they had tough competition in newly rising club Kometal GP Skopje.

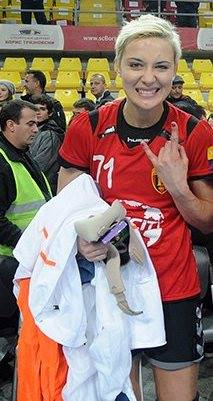
Tatyana Khmyrova Champions league match 2014

- First league days

Until Kometal Gjorče Petrov officially stopped working, Vardar was the only other club to win any title in any of the competitions in Macedonia by winning the 1994 Macedonian Cup. In the 2012/2013 season with the arrival of the new sponsor and sporting director Sergey Samsonenko along with some new players, the team started to achieve more positive results and won its first league title.

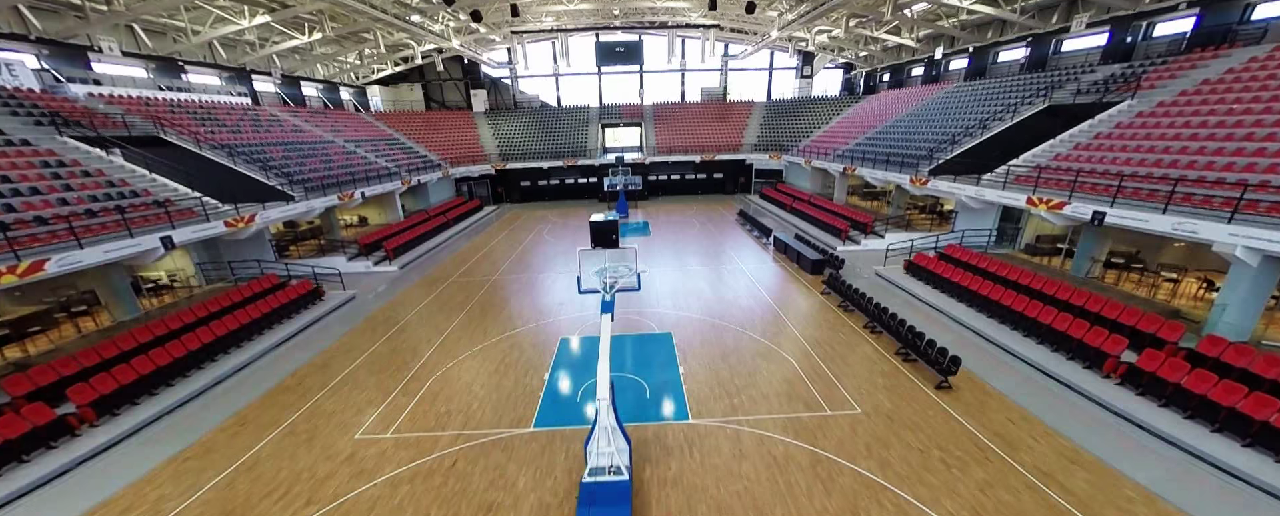
Jane Sandanski Arena

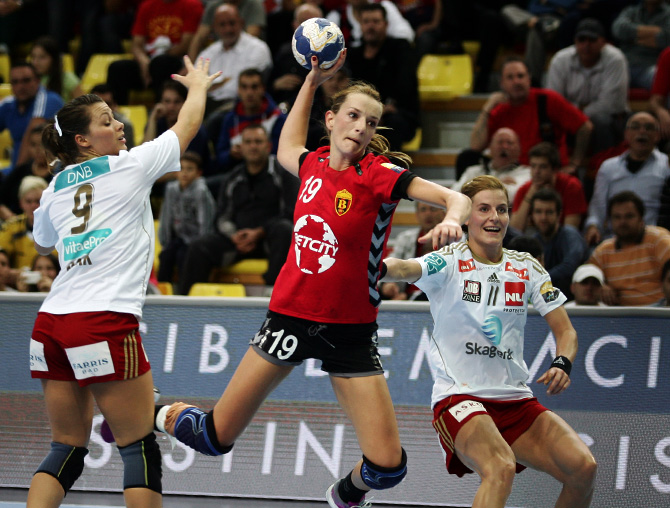
Maja Zebich Champions league match 2013

- Stardom Days

Vardar got back on the champions track in the beginning of 2011 when their financial situation improved again. They brought new players and started constructing a team with which Vardar began winning championships and cups, as well as the Regional League. They performed successfully in the Women's Champions league, securing victories against high-level teams. In the year 2012 the new Sports center Jane Sandanski was built which became handball temple of Glory . Since 2013, the team had three 3rd-place finishes in the EHF Champions League and two 2nd-place finishes in the seasons 2016–17 and 2017–18 being the only team that competed in the all EHF Final Four Tournaments.

- Recent rank

Earlier in 2018 the president of the club, Gordana Naceva, announced the breakup of the team made up from world class players and added that they will focus on young players. In the season 2019 and 2020 Vardar finished 3rd in the Macedonian league. They didn't play in the Champions league any more after they've decided that their team is not strong enough for the competition.

== Arena information ==
Unlike the usual situation in handball of clubs renting halls from municipalities or private owners, HC Vardar itself is the owner of the Jane Sandanski Arena where they play all their home matches in the Women's EHF Champions League, the Women's Regional Handball League and in the domestic competitions.

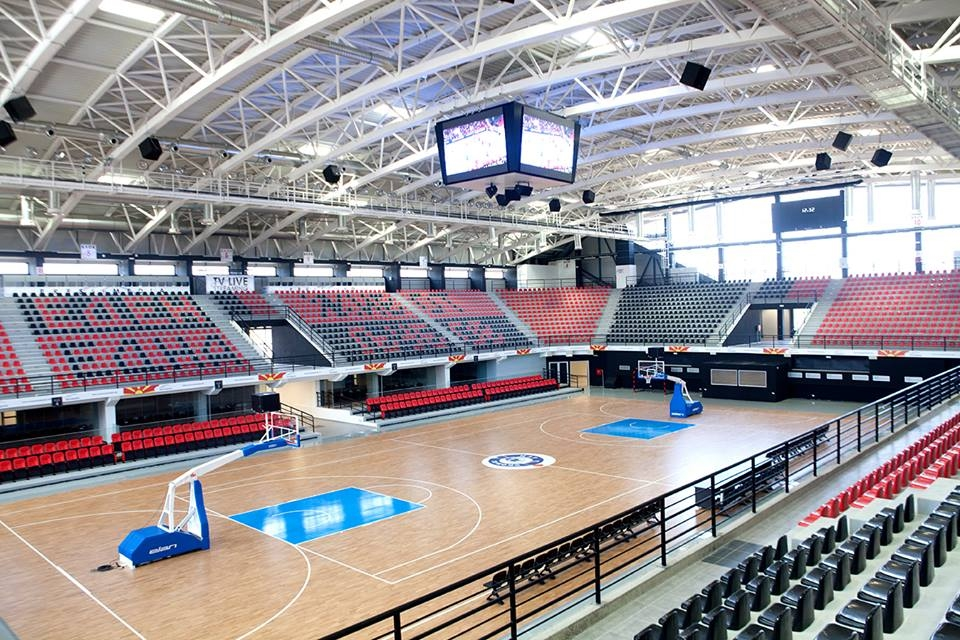

== Accomplishments ==
=== Domestic competitions (North Macedonia) ===
- Macedonian First League:

Winners (6): 2012–13, 2013–14, 2014–15, 2015–16, 2016–17, 2017–18

- Macedonian Cup

Winners (6): 1994, 2014, 2015, 2016, 2017, 2018

=== European competitions (European Union) ===
- EHF Champions League:

Runner-up: 2016–17, 2017–18
Third placed: 2013–14, 2014–15, 2015–16

=== Other competitions ===
- Women's Regional Handball League:

Winners: 2016–17, 2017–18
Runner-up: 2013–14

- Bucharest Trophy:

Third placed: 2015

- Vardar Trophy:

Winners: 2015
Runner-up: 2017

== Kits ==
HOME
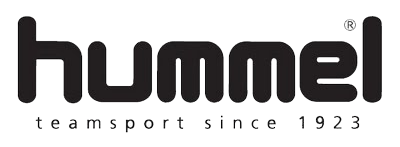
2017–18

AWAY
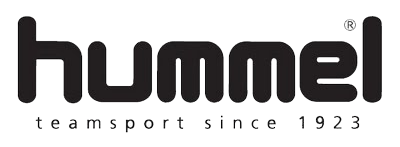
2017–18

== Team ==
=== Current squad ===
Squad for the 2021–22 season

WHC Vardar 1961

Goalkeepers

- 1 (North Macedonia) Jovana Trajkoska
- 12 (North Macedonia) Simona Grujovska
- 16 (North Macedonia) Andrea Ilić

Right Wingers

- 28 (North Macedonia) Sara Minovska
- 40 (North Macedonia) Iva Jakovchevska
- 74 (North Macedonia) Mirjana Petkovska

Left Wingers

- 8 (North Macedonia) Stefanija Gjeorgievska
- 21 (North Macedonia) Ivona Trpevska
- 26 (North Macedonia) Bojana Dinevska

Line players

- 93 (North Macedonia) Katerina Damjanoska

Left Backs

- 3 (North Macedonia) Marija Gocevska
- 31 (North Macedonia) Andrea Sedloska
- 97 (North Macedonia) Milica Nikolić

Central Backs

- 10 (North Macedonia) Ana Marija Božinovska
- 14 (North Macedonia) Keti Angelovska
- 23 (North Macedonia) Angela Grozdanovska
- 33 (North Macedonia) Ana Marija Kolarovska
- 51 (North Macedonia) Marija Galevska

Right Backs

- 24 (North Macedonia) Angela Kostović

== Staff ==
=== Professional staff ===
Position	Name
Head coach	(North Macedonia) Dragana Pecevska Ristova
Assistant coach	(North Macedonia) Biljana Crvenkoska
Goalkeeping coach	(North Macedonia) Aleksandar Carchev
Conditioning coach	(Serbia) Marija Lojanica
Physiotherapists	(North Macedonia) Bojana Božinovska

=== Management ===
Position	Name
Owner	(North Macedonia) Mihajlo Mihajlovski
President	(North Macedonia) Gordana Naceva
Executive director	(North Macedonia) Davor Stojanovski
Operative manager	(North Macedonia) Ana Stojkov
Sporting director	(Russia) Eduard Koksharov

== Former club members ==
=== Notable former players ===
- (North Macedonia) Julija Nikolić
- (North Macedonia) Marija Shteriova
- (North Macedonia) Dragana Pecevska
- (North Macedonia) Biljana Crvenkoska
- (North Macedonia) Andrea Beleska
- (North Macedonia) Ivana Sazdovski
- (North Macedonia) Robertina Mečevska
- (North Macedonia) Dragana Petkovska
- (North Macedonia) Sara Ristovska
- (North Macedonia) Mirjeta Bajramoska
- (North Macedonia) Teodora Keramičieva
- (North Macedonia) Ivana Gakidova
- (North Macedonia) Simona Stojanovska
- (North Macedonia) Sara Mitova
- (North Macedonia) Jovana Micevska
- (North Macedonia) Leonida Gičevska
- (North Macedonia) Jovana Sazdovska
- (Russia) Inna Suslina
- (Russia) Polina Kuznetsova
- (Russia) Tatiana Khmyrova
- (Russia) Olga Chernoivanenko
- (Russia) Nigina Saidova
- (Russia) Ekaterina Kostyukova
- (Russia) Alena Ikhneva
- (Russia) Olesya Kiriy
- (Russia) Ekaterina Lubyanaya
- (Russia) Oksana Orekhova
- (Russia) Anastasia Svetlova
- (Russia) Anna Vinogradova
- (Russia) Olga Vinogradova
- (Russia) Evgenia Zhulkina
- (Serbia) Andrea Lekić
- (Serbia) Dragana Cvijić
- (Serbia) Marija Petrović
- (Serbia) Sanja Damnjanović
- (Serbia) Marija Lojpur
- (Serbia) Marina Dmitrović
- (Serbia) Tatjana Trbovic
- (Montenegro) Andrea Klikovac
- (Montenegro) Jovanka Radičević
- (Montenegro) Ana Đokić
- (Montenegro) Itana Grbić
- (France) Allison Pineau
- (France) Siraba Dembélé
- (France) Amandine Leynaud
- (France) Alexandra Lacrabère
- (Croatia) Andrea Penezić
- (Croatia) Andrea Čanađija
- (Croatia) Maja Sokač
- (Slovenia) Barbara Lazović
- (Slovenia) Tamara Mavsar
- (Brazil) Dayane Pires da Rocha
- (Brazil) Mayssa Pessoa
- (Spain) Begoña Fernández
- (Belarus) Dziyana Ilyina
- (Germany) Anja Althaus
- (Norway) Camilla Herrem

=== Notable former coaches ===
- (North Macedonia) Indira Kastratović (2012–2015)
- (North Macedonia) Ace Stankovski
- (North Macedonia) Sime Simovski
- (Denmark) Jan Pytlick (2015–2016)
- (Denmark) Kim Rasmussen (2015)
- (Spain) David Davis (2016–2017)
- (Spain) Roberto García Parrondo (2018–2019)
- (Russia) Eduard Koksharov (2016)
- (Russia) Irina Dibirova

== Kit manufacturers ==
- Hummel International

== European competitions record ==
=== EHF Champions League ===
Season	Round	Club	Home	Away	Aggregate
2013–14	Q2-SF	(Italy) Jomi Salerno	35–16		
2013–14	Q2-F	(France) Fleury Loiret Handball	33–25		
2013–14	GM (Group D)	(Norway) Larvik	27–27	31–29	1st
2013–14	GM (Group D)	(Spain) Balonmano Bera Bera	30–20	23–19	1st
2013–14	GM (Group D)	(Croatia) RK Podravka Koprivnica	39–26	35–17	1st
2013–14	MR (Group 1)	(Denmark) FC Midtjylland	24–23	24–25	1st
2013–14	MR (Group 1)	(Germany) Thüringer HC	31–25	24–24	1st
2013–14	MR (Group 1)	(Sweden) IK Sävehof	24–18	27–27	1st
2013–14	SF (F4)	(Montenegro) Budućnost	20–22		
2013–14	3rd (F4)	(Denmark) FC Midtjylland	34–31		
2014–15	GM (Group C)	(Montenegro) Budućnost	24–24	17–23	2nd
2014–15	GM (Group C)	(Croatia) Podravka Koprivnica	35–25	27–26	2nd
2014–15	GM (Group C)	(Germany) Thüringer HC	26–21	20–21	2nd
2014–15	MR (Group 1)	(Russia) Dinamo-Sinara	28–27	25–33	2nd
2014–15	MR (Group 1)	(Germany) HC Leipzig	26–20	23–26	2nd
2014–15	MR (Group 1)	(Slovenia) RK Krim	41–30	47–29	2nd
2014–15	QF	(Hungary) Győri ETO KC	24–18	27–27	51–45
2014–15	SF (F4)	(Montenegro) Budućnost	17–27		
2014–15	3rd (F4)	(Russia) Dinamo-Sinara	28–26		
2015–16	GM (Group C)	(Denmark) FC Midtjylland	33–24	25−15	2nd
2015–16	GM (Group C)	(Austria) Hypo Niederösterreich	37−25	38–25	2nd
2015–16	GM (Group C)	(Hungary) Győri ETO KC	22–27	27−28	2nd
2015–16	MR (Group 2)	(Romania) CSM Bucharest	22−21	30−25	3rd
2015–16	MR (Group 2)	(Montenegro) Budućnost	26−24	19−31	3rd
2015–16	MR (Group 2)	(Sweden) IK Sävehof	37−25	29−26	3rd
2015–16	QF	(Norway) Larvik	34–20	26–28	60–48
2015–16	SF (F4)	(Romania) CSM Bucharest	21–27		
2015–16	3rd (F4)	(Montenegro) Budućnost	30–28		
2016–17	GM (Group B)	(Hungary) Ferencvárosi TC	27–27	37–24	1st
2016–17	GM (Group B)	(Russia) HC Astrakhanochka	39–25	31–26	1st
2016–17	GM (Group B)	(Germany) HC Leipzig	41–24	45–22	1st
2016–17	MR (Group 1)	(France) Metz	23−21	28−42	1st
2016–17	MR (Group 1)	(Montenegro) Budućnost	28−31	31−28	1st
2016–17	MR (Group 1)	(Germany) Thüringer HC	36−26	31−29	1st
2016–17	QF	(Denmark) FC Midtjylland	26–24	28–26	54–50
2016–17	SF (F4)	(Romania) CSM Bucharest	38–33		
2016–17	F (F4)	(Hungary) Győri ETO KC	30–31 (ET)		
2017–18	GM (Group C)	(Hungary) Ferencvárosi TC	34–31	29–28	1st
2017–18	GM (Group C)	(Norway) Larvik	30–27	31–19	1st
2017–18	GM (Group C)	(Germany) Thüringer HC	29–21	29–21	1st
2017–18	MR (Group 2)	(France) Metz	29−23	22−24	1st
2017–18	MR (Group 2)	(Germany) SG BBM Bietigheim	30−22	38−26	1st
2017–18	MR (Group 2)	(Montenegro) Budućnost	31−24	30−25	1st
2017–18	QF	(Denmark) FC Midtjylland	32–25	24–23	56–48
2017–18	SF (F4)	(Russia) Rostov-Don	25–19		
2017–18	F (F4)	(Hungary) Győri ETO KC	26–27 (ET)		

=== EHF Cup ===
Season	Round	Club	1st leg	2nd leg	Aggregate
2002–03	R2	(Serbia and Montenegro) Duvanska Industrija Nis	11–45	14–33	25–78
2003–04	R2	(Greece) O.F.N. Ionias	21–28	12–30	33–58
2011–12	R32	(Hungary) Békéscsabai ENKSE	20–39	20–40	40–79
2012–13	2Q	(Greece) Patras	28–19	27–16	55–35
2012–13	R16	(Russia) Kuban Krasnodar	30–28	17–22	47–50

=== Challenge Cup ===
Season	Round	Club	1st leg	2nd leg	Aggregate
1999–00	1/16	(Lithuania) Eastcon AG Vilnius	15–35	13–35	28–70
1994–95	1/16	(Switzerland) ATV Basel	24–16	23–23	47–39
1994–95	1/8	(Germany) TV Mainzlar	20–31	24–24	44–54
1995–96	1/16	Austria Tabak	15–24	11–21	26–45
2001–02	R3	(North Macedonia) RK Skopje	18–20	16–14	34–34
2001–02	R4	(Portugal) CD Gil Eanes-Lagos	13–25	31–26	44–51
2008–09	R3	(Turkey) Cankaya Beld	30–33	32–32	52–55

=== Regional Handball League ===
Season	Round	Club	1st leg	2nd leg	Placement
2012–13	MR	(Serbia) ŽRK Zaječar	25–28	32–29	5th
2012–13	MR	(Serbia) ŽORK Jagodina	36–26	24–22	5th
2012–13	MR	(Montenegro) Budućnost	21–26	21–41	5th
2012–13	MR	(Montenegro) ŽRK Biseri Pljevlja	31–24	37–20	5th
2012–13	MR	(Croatia) RK Lokomotiva Zagreb	21–23	25–28	5th
2012–13	MR	(Croatia) Podravka Koprivnica	23–25	22–25	5th
2012–13	MR	(North Macedonia) ŽRK Metalurg	16–25	14–23	5th
2013–14	MR	(Montenegro) ŽRK Danilovgrad	33–13	25–16	2nd
2013–14	MR	(Montenegro) Budućnost	20–24	28–32	2nd
2013–14	MR	(Slovenia) RK Krim	26–22	CAN	2nd
2013–14	MR	(Slovenia) RK Zagorje	35–27	33–22	2nd
2013–14	MR	(Croatia) RK Lokomotiva Zagreb	16–14	21–25	2nd
2013–14	MR	(Croatia) Podravka Koprivnica	28–28	29–24	2nd
2013–14	MR	(North Macedonia) ŽRK Metalurg	35–26	29–22	2nd
2016–17	MR	(Montenegro) Budućnost	29–30	28–27	1st
2016–17	MR	(Croatia) Podravka Koprivnica	30–19	35–18	1st
2016–17	MR	(Slovenia) RK Krim	38–29	27–26	1st
2016–17	SF	(Croatia) Podravka Koprivnica	29–16		
2016–17	F	(Montenegro) Budućnost	27–25		
2017–18	MR	(Montenegro) Budućnost	24–22 31–24 27–26	21–20 25–25	1st
2017–18	MR	(Slovenia) RK Krim	30–27 25–24 29–34	32–29 32–31	1st

== European competitions record (WHC Vardar SCJS) ==
=== EHF Cup ===
Season	Round	Club	1st leg	2nd leg	Aggregate
2014–15	R3	(Hungary) Dunaújvárosi KKA	20–28	15–30	35–58

=== Challenge Cup ===
Season	Round	Club	1st leg	2nd leg	Aggregate
2015–16	R3	(United Kingdom) London Angels HC	27–14	35–17	62–31
2015–16	L16	(Serbia) Minaqua Vojvodina	26–24	31–27	57–51
2015–16	QF	(Ukraine) HC Karpaty Uzhhorod	22–19	17–28	39–47
2016–17	R3	(Bulgaria) HC Svilengrad-PU	24–17	29–22	53–39
2016–17	1/8	(Sweden) H 65 Höör	13–26	20–26	33–52

== Statistics ==
=== All–time Top 10 Scorers in the EHF Champions League ===
As of 2017–18 season

Rank	Name	Seasons	Goals
1	(Croatia) Andrea Penezić	4	371
2	(Serbia) Andrea Lekić	5	335
3	(Montenegro) Jovanka Radičević	5	293
4	(Slovenia) Barbara Lazović	4	144
5	(France) Alexandra Lacrabère	2	114
6	(France) Siraba Dembélé	3	113
7	(Russia) Tatyana Khmyrova	5	105
8	(Croatia) Maja Sokač	3	95
9	(Germany) Anja Althaus	3	90
10	(Serbia) Dragana Cvijić	1	55

=== Most appearances in the EHF Champions League ===
As of 2017–18 season

Rank	Name	Seasons	Appearances
1	(Montenegro) Jovanka Radičević	5	77
2	(France) Amandine Leynaud	5	75
3	(Montenegro) Andrea Klikovac	5	74
4	(Russia) Inna Suslina	5	73
5	(Serbia) Andrea Lekić	5	70
6	(Russia) Tatyana Khmyrova	5	63
6	(Croatia) Andrea Penezić	4	63
6	(Slovenia) Barbara Lazović	4	63
9	(France) Siraba Dembélé	3	46
10	(Croatia) Maja Sokač	3	45
10	(Germany) Anja Althaus	3	45

=== Individual awards in the EHF Champions League ===
Season	Player	Award
2013–14	(Montenegro) Ana Đokić	All–Star Team (Best Line Player)
2013–14	(Montenegro) Jovanka Radičević	All–Star Team (Best Right Wing)
2014–15	(Croatia) Andrea Penezić (shared with (Romania) Cristina Neagu)	Top Scorer (102 goals)
2014–15	(France) Siraba Dembélé	All–Star Team (Best Left Wing)
2015–16	(Montenegro) Jovanka Radičević	All–Star Team (Best Right Wing)
2016–17	(Croatia) Andrea Penezić	Top Scorer (98 goals)
2016–17	(Norway) Camilla Herrem	All–Star Team (Best Left Wing)
2017–18	(Serbia) Dragana Cvijić	All–Star Team (Best Line Player)
2017–18	(France) Amandine Leynaud	MVP of the Final 4
