= Marija Guguljanova =

Macedonian female handballer

Personal information
- Nationality: Macedonian
- Born: 11 November 1999 (age 26) Skopje, Macedonia
- Height: 1.73 m (5 ft 8 in)

Sport
- Sport: Handball
- Position: Right winger
- Current club: ŽRK Metalurg
- Number: 11

Senior clubs
- Years: Team
- 2019-: ŽRK Metalurg
National team
Years	Team	Apps	(Gls)
2022–	North Macedonia	1	(0)

Marija Guguljanova (born 11 November 1999) is a Macedonian female handballer for ŽRK Metalurg and the North Macedonia national team.

She represented the North Macedonia at the 2022 European Women's Handball Championship.
