= Amandine Leynaud =

French handball player (born 1986)

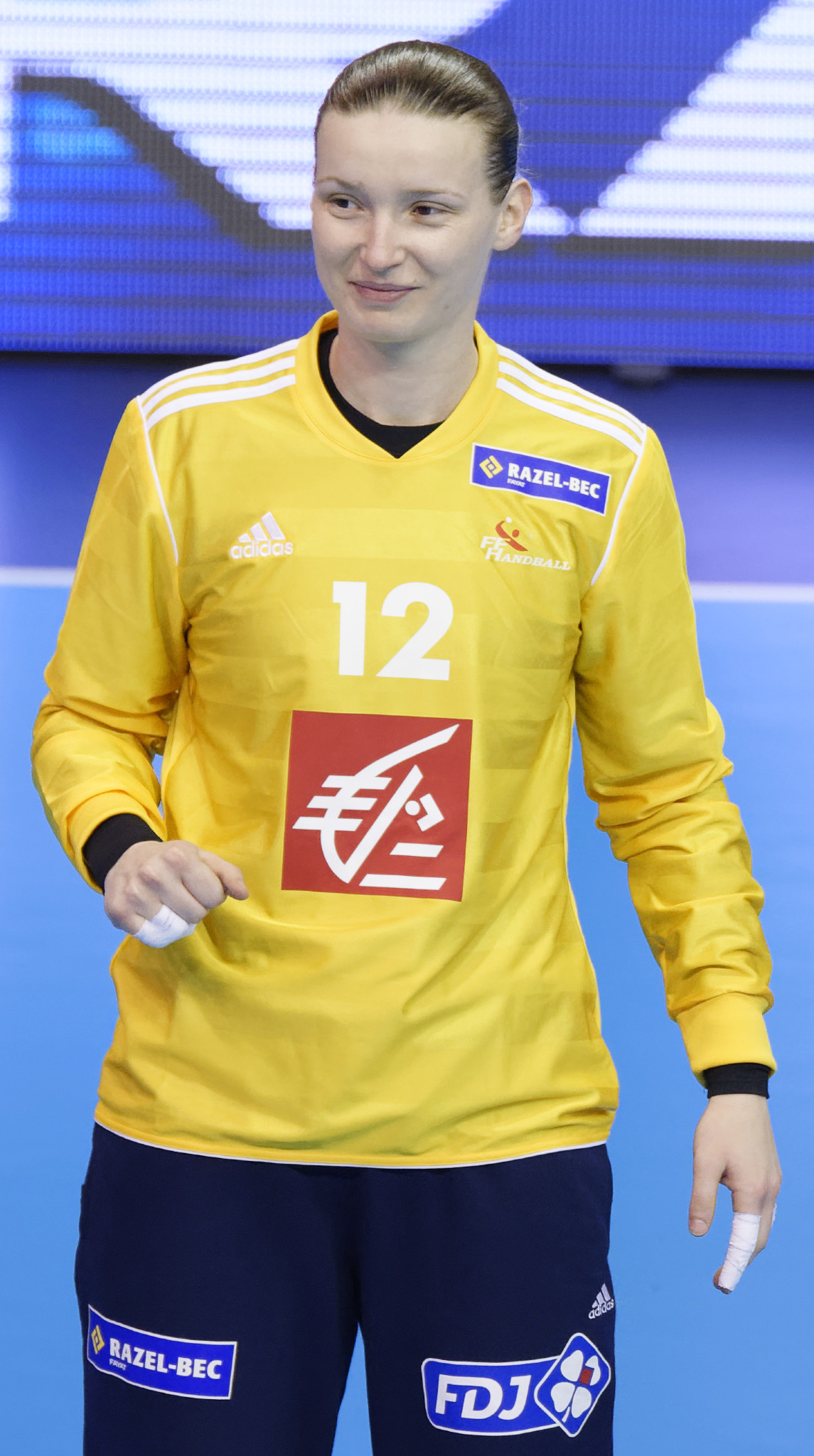
- Leynaud in 2015

Personal information
- Full name: Amandine Suzanne; Monique Leynaud
- Nationality: French
- Born: 2 May 1986 (age 40) Aubenas, France
- Height: 1.78 m (5 ft 10 in)

Sport
- Sport: Handball
- Position: Goalkeeper

Youth career
- Years: Team
- 2000–2003: Aubenas Handball
- 2003–2004: Bourg-de-Péage

Senior clubs
- Years: Team
- 2004–2012: Metz Handball
- 2012–2013: CS Oltchim Râmnicu Vâlcea
- 2013–2018: ŽRK Vardar
- 2018–2022: Győri ETO KC
- 2023: Győri ETO KC
National team
Years	Team	Apps	(Gls)
2005–2021	France	254	(3)

Teams managed
- 2020–2022: Győri ETO KC (player-goalkeeping coach)
- 2022: Bourg-de-Péage (goalkeeping coach)
- 2022–: France (goalkeeping coach)
Medal record
Olympic Games
Gold medal – first place	2020 Tokyo	Team
Silver medal – second place	2016 Rio de Janeiro	Team
World Championship
Gold medal – first place	2017 Germany
Silver medal – second place	2009 China
Silver medal – second place	2011 Brazil
European Championship
Gold medal – first place	2018 France
Silver medal – second place	2020 Denmark
Bronze medal – third place	2016 Sweden
- Updated on 24 March 2024

Amandine Suzanne Monique Leynaud (born 2 May 1986) is a former French professional handball player. She is openly lesbian and she and her wife Annabelle are parents to Marcel and Mila. She is currently the goalkeeping coach of the French national handball team.

== Career ==
She competed at the 2008, 2012 and 2016 and won a silver medal in 2016, finishing fifth in 2008 and 2012. Domestically she was named the Best Goalkeeper in French Division 1 in 2009, 2010 and 2011.

At the 2008 Olympics, both Leynaud and teammate Valérie Nicolas were listed among the top goalkeepers in the competition. After Nicolas retired from the national team, Leynaud's status as the starting goalkeeper was secured. At the 2012 Olympics, Leynaud was listed third among the top ten goalkeepers of the championship with a rate of 38%.

For the 2012–13 season, Leynaud signed for Romanian top club CS Oltchim Râmnicu Vâlcea but failed to play any official match after she suffered a ligaments injury to the right ankle in August 2012, which required surgery. The team was disbanded at the end of the season due to financial difficulties. Due to her injury Leynaud also missed the 2012 European Championships.

From 2013 until 2018, she played for ŽRK Vardar. Together with them, she played in the Final Four five times in a row, finishing third three-times and reaching the final twice (in 2017 and in 2018).

In 2018, she joined the star-studded Hungarian team, Győr. Since 2020, she also served as the goalkeeper coach of the team until 2022, when she retired. One year after she has ended her career she returned to Győr because of Silje Solberg's pregnancy.

== Personal life ==
She is raising their twins, Marcel and Mila, together with her wife, Annabelle.

== Achievements ==
- EHF Champions League:
  - Winner: 2019
- French Championship:
  - Winner: 2005, 2006, 2007, 2008, 2009, 2011
- French Cup:
  - Winner: 2010
- French League Cup:
  - Winner: 2005, 2006, 2007, 2008, 2009, 2010, 2011
- Hungarian Championship
  - Winner: 2019, 2022, 2023
- Hungarian Cup:
  - Winner: 2019, 2021

== Individual awards ==
- Handball-Planet.com All-Star Goalkeeper: 2017
- MVP of the EHF Champions League Final Four: 2018
- All-Star Goalkeeper of the Møbelringen Cup: 2018
- All-Star Goalkeeper of the European Championship: 2018
- All-Star Goalkeeper of the EHF Champions League: 2020, 2021
