= Marija Shteriova =

Macedonian handball player

Personal information
- Nationality: Macedonian
- Born: 19 March 1991 (age 35) Skopje, SR Macedonia, SFR Yugoslavia
- Height: 179 cm (5 ft 10 1/2 in)

Sport
- Sport: Handball
- Position: Left back
- Current club: HC Dunărea Brăila

Senior clubs
- Years: Team
- 2012–2014: ŽRK Vardar
- 2014–2015: Váci NKSE
- 2015: Fehérvár
- 2015–2016: Volda Handball
- 2016–2017: Kastamonu Bld. GSK
- 2017–2018: HC Dunărea Brăila
- 2018-2020: Minaur Baia Mare
- 2020-2022: Gloria Buzău
National team
- Years: Team
- –: Macedonia

Marija Shteriova (born 19 March 1991), is a Macedonian handball player who plays for HC Dunărea Brăila and the Macedonian national team.

== International honours ==
- EHF Champions League:
  - Bronze Medalist: 2014
