= Anastasija Nikolovska =

Macedonian female handballer

Personal information
- Nationality: Macedonian
- Born: 12 August 1998 (age 28) Skopje, Macedonia
- Height: 1.68 m (5 ft 6 in)

Sport
- Sport: Handball
- Position: Left wing
- Current club: ZRK Metalurg
- Number: 77

Senior clubs
- Years: Team
- 2021–2022: ZRK Cair
- 2022–2025: WHC Gjorche Petrov
- 2025–: ZRK Metalurg
National team
| Years | Team | Apps | (Gls) |
| 2022– | North Macedonia | 3 | (0) |

Anastasija Nikolovska (born 12 August 1998) is a Macedonian female handballer for ZRK Metalurg and the North Macedonia national team.

She represented the North Macedonia at the 2022 European Women's Handball Championship.
