= Joanna Wołoszyk =

Polish handball player (born 1995)

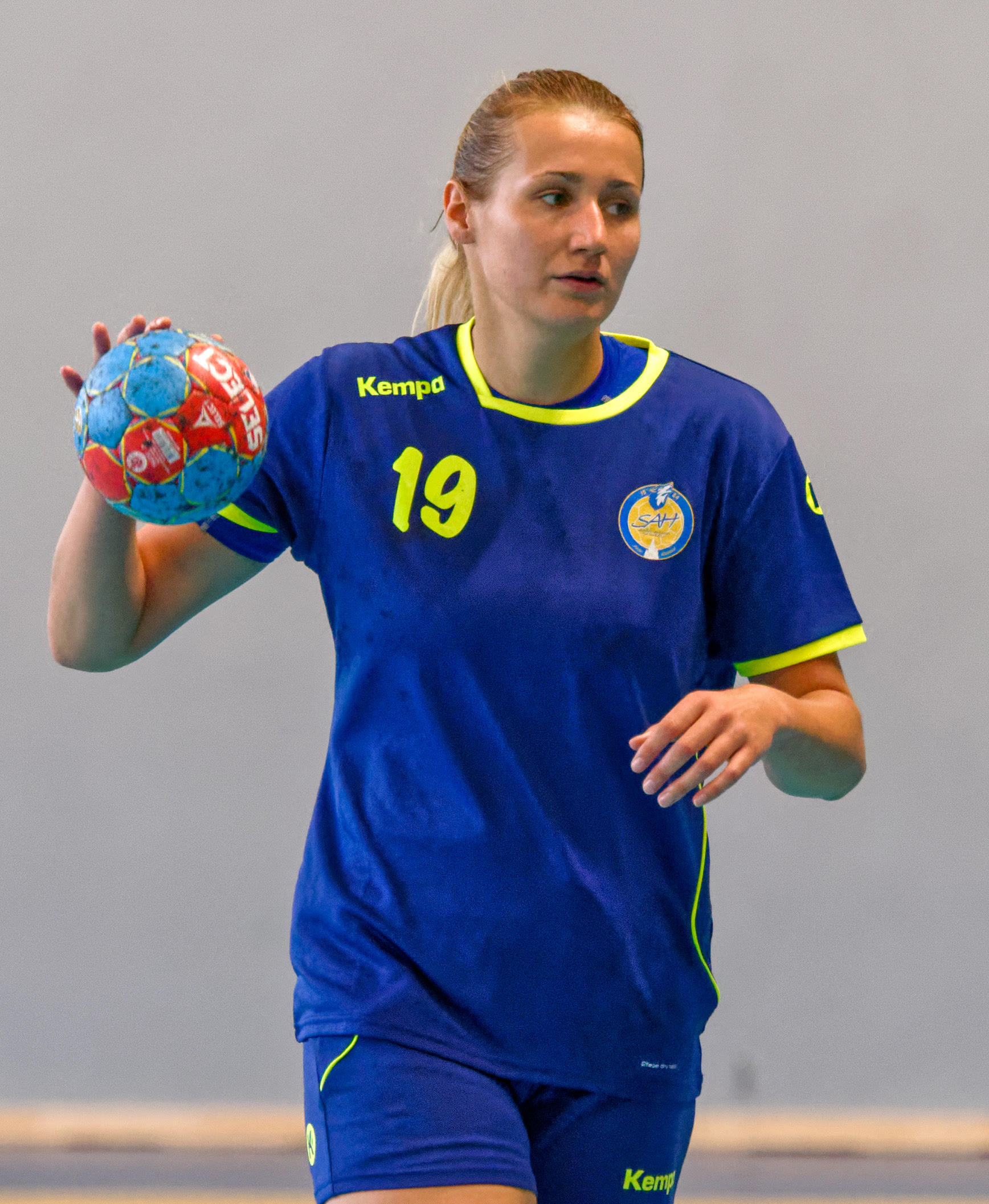
- Joanna Wołoszyk (2020)

Personal information
- Nationality: Polish
- Born: 19 January 1995 (age 31) Sztum, Poland
- Height: 1.84 m (6 ft 0 in)

Sport
- Sport: Handball
- Position: Left back
- Current club: EB Start Elbląg
- Number: 19

Senior clubs
- Years: Team
- 2014-2018: Vistal Gdynia
- 2018-2019: Pogon Szczecin
- 2019-2020: Kastamonu Bld. GSK
- 2020-2021: Saint-Amand Handball
- 2021-: EB Start Elbląg
National team
Years	Team	Apps	(Gls)
2016-	Poland	41	(19)

Joanna Wołoszyk (née Kozłowska, born 19 January 1995) is a Polish handball player for Saint-Amand Handball and the Polish national team.

She participated at the 2016 European Women's Handball Championship, 2017 World Women's Handball Championship and 2018 European Women's Handball Championship. In season 2017/2018 she played in the Women's EHF Champions League and Women's EHF Cup where she scored 33 goals in 11 matches. The next season was player in Pogon Szczecin. She has come to final EHF Challenge Cup where her team Pogon lost with Rocasa Gran Canaria. In the 2019/20 season, she played for the Turkish Champion's team where she won the Turkish Super Cup and get 1/4 EHF Cup. In the Turkish league, the Kastomonu team was in 1st place where they won all matches in the Turkish league. In 2020, she joined French club Saint-Amand Handball.

== Statistics ==
Season	Club		League		Europe		Total	
Season	Club		Apps	Goals	Apps	Goals	Apps	Goals
2014/15	Vistal Gdynia	Polish League	29	79	2	3	31	82
2015/16	Vistal Gdynia	Polish League	33	65	2	3	35	68
2016/17	Vistal Gdynia	Polish League	32	101	2	3	34	104
2017/18	Vistal Gdynia	Polish League	27	101	11	33	38	134
2018/19	Pogon Szczecin	Polish League	28	71	8	18	36	89
2019/20	Kastamonu Bld. GSK	Turkish League	15	24	12	7	27	31
2020/21	Saint-Amand Handball	French League	28	36	-	-	28	36
Total							229	544

== Honours ==
Polish League:

- Winner: 2017

Challenge Cup:

- Silver Medalist: 2019

Polish Cup:

- Winner: 2014, 2015, 2016

Super Cup of Turkish:

- Winner: 2019

Carpathian Trophy:

- Winner: 2017
