= Ivana Sazdovska =

Macedonian handball player

Ivana Sazdovski
Personal information
- Nationality: Macedonian
- Born: 12 April 1990 (age 36)
- Height: 1.76 m (5 ft 9 in)

Sport
- Sport: Handball
- Position: Left back
- Current club: ŽRK Vardar
- Number: 7
National team
Years	Team	Apps	(Gls)
–	Macedonia	0	(0)
- Updated on 4 December 2012

Ivana Sazdovski (born 12 April 1990) is a Macedonian handball player for ŽRK Vardar and the Macedonian national team.
