= Kwintsheul =

Kwintsheul De Heul
- Town
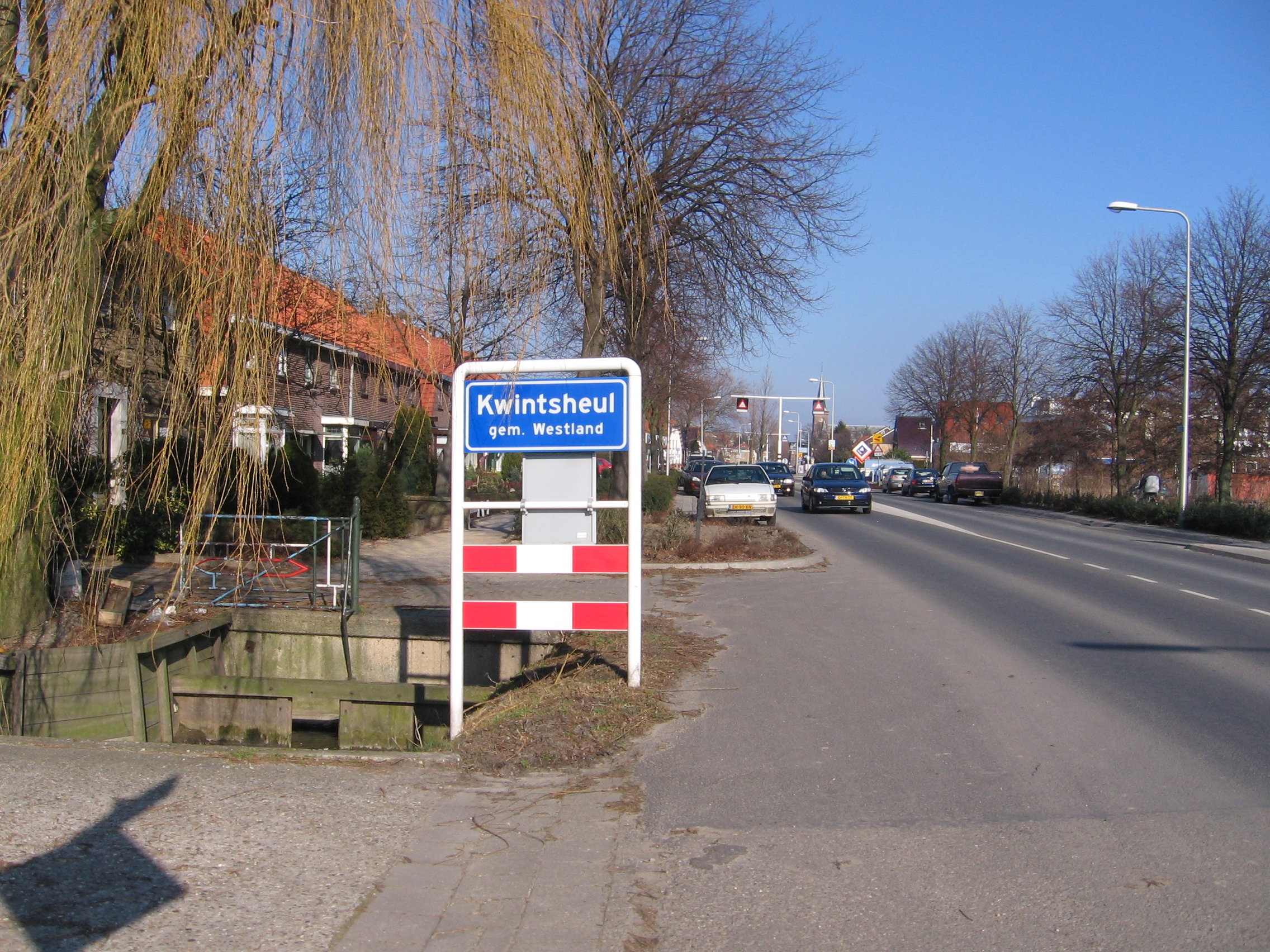

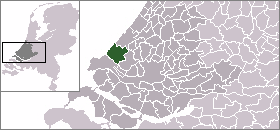

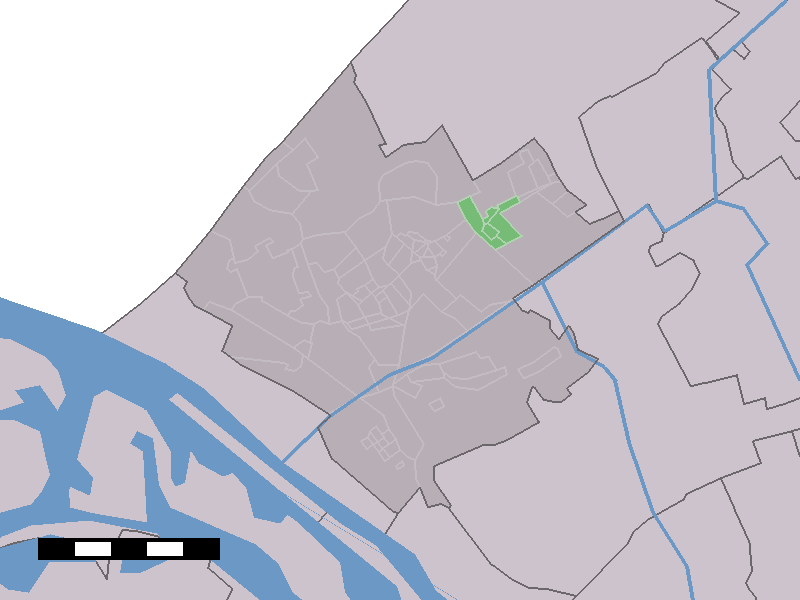
- Kwintsheul in the municipality of Westland.
- Coordinates: 52°1′N 4°15′E
- Country: Netherlands
- Province: South Holland
- Municipality: Westland

Population (2005)
  - Total: 3,560
- Time zone: UTC+1 (CET)
  - Summer (DST): UTC+2 (CEST)

Kwintsheul is a village in the Dutch province of South Holland. It is a part of the municipality of Westland, and lies about 2 km southwest of the border of The Hague.

The statistical area "Kwintsheul", which also can include the surrounding countryside, has a population of around 3,360 people.

== Sports ==
The local handball team RKHV Quintus has won the Dutch Women's Championship twice in 2006 and 2007.
