= Oktawia Płomińska =

Polish handball player

Personal information
- Nationality: Polish
- Born: 5 October 1998 (age 28) Piotrków Trybunalski, Poland
- Height: 1.66 m (5 ft 5 in)

Sport
- Sport: Handball
- Position: Left wing
- Current club: MKS Lublin
- Number: 3

Youth career
- Years: Team
- 2008-2013: UKS PR Ruch Chorzów

Senior clubs
- Years: Team
- 2013–2017: UKS PR Ruch Chorzów
- 2017–2019: Pogoń Szczecin
- 2019-2020: MTS Żory
- 2020-2021: Piotrcovia Piotrków Trybunalski
- 2021-: MKS Lublin
National team
Years	Team	Apps	(Gls)
2021–	Poland	17	(30)
- Updated on 22 October 2023

Oktawia Płomińska (born 5 October 1998) is a Polish handballer for MKS Lublin and the Polish national team.

She participated in the 2021 World Women's Handball Championship in Spain, placing 15th.

== Achievements ==
- Puchar Polski:
  - Finalist: 2018, 2019
- EHF Challenge Cup:
  - Finalist: 2019
