= ŽRK Kumanovo =

Women's handball club in North Macedonia

WHC Kumanovo
- Full name: ŽRK Kumanovo
- Arena: Sports Hall Kumanovo
- Capacity: 6,000
- President: Boban Peovski
- Head coach: Aleksandar Bojkovski
- League: Super Liga
- 2025/26: 4
- Club colours
Home	Away

ŽRK Kumanovo is a women's handball club from Kumanovo in North Macedonia. ŽRK Kumanovo competes in the Super Liga. They have won the Macedonian cup title in 2019. Next year they won the Macedonian Championship 2020.

== History ==
Kumanovo always had a great handball team that competed on a very high level. They were always at top 4 teams during the decades since its establishment. They've won the first title back in 1980s. After many years of dominance of the Skopjes clubs in the league WHC Kumanovo broke through and won the cup title in 2019. Then they got the champions title after 40 years in season 2019-20. They've repeated this success in 2021 winning the double crown cup and championship. Kumanovo team also had significant seasons in European competitions in the last 3 years.

== Accomplishments ==
=== Domestic competitions (North Macedonia) ===
- Champions

:1981, 2020, 2021

- Macedonian Cup

: 2019, 2021, 2023

=== European competitions (European Union) ===
Season	Competition	Round	Club	Home	Away	Aggregate
2004–05	Challenge Cup	1/8	(Italy) Florgarden	20–48	30–51	50–103
2012–13	Challenge Cup	1/8	(Bosnia and Herzegovina) Zrinjski Mostar	18–30	29–31	47–61
2016-17	Challenge Cup	R2	(Spain) Alcobendas	17–23	15–31	32–54
2017–18	Challenge Cup	R3	(Poland) Lublin	18–41	13–54	31–95
2018–19	Challenge Cup	R3	(Netherlands) Dames 1 V&L	15–39	21–31	36–70
2019-20	EHF Cup	R1	(Czech Republic) DHC Slavia Prague	27–23	24–31	51–54
2023–24	EHF Cup	R1	(Switzerland) HV Herzogenbuchsee	22–29	17–31	39–60

== Kumanovo Arena ==
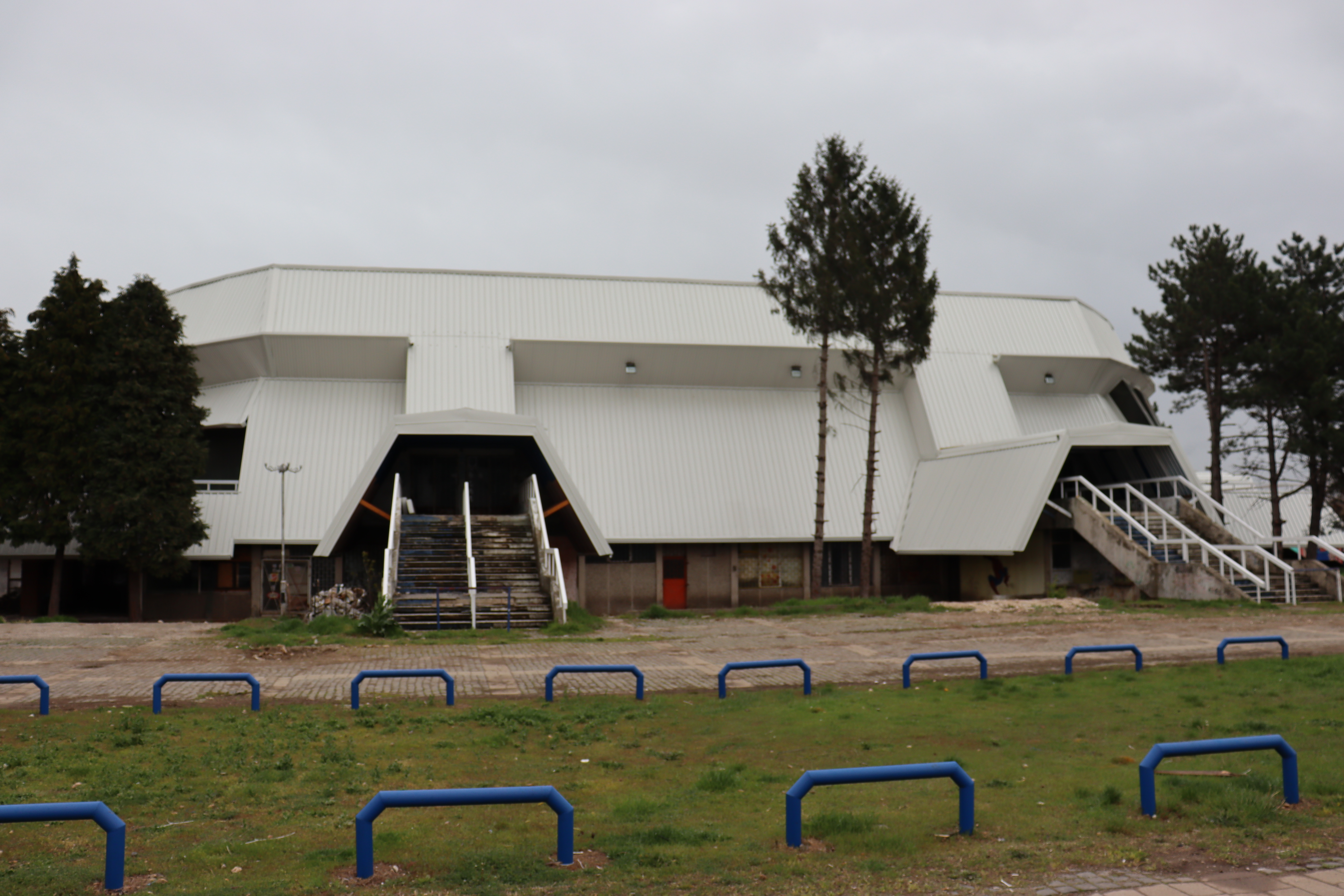

Sports Hall Kumanovo is an indoor sport venue located in Kumanovo, North Macedonia. The hall has capacity of 6,500 seats and was built in 1980. It is the biggest indoor sport hall in Kumanovo, where competitions of basketball, indoor soccer, handball, volleyball and boxing matches are held.

== Team ==
=== Current squad ===
Squad for the 2025–26 season

WHC Kumanovo

- 12 (North Macedonia) Mila Andjelovska
- 1 (North Macedonia) Simona Grujovska
- 16 (North Macedonia) Аnа Маriја Gоrgоvsка
- 3 (North Macedonia) Jasna Trajkovikj

Right wingers

- 44 (North Macedonia) Rosana Pavlova
- 13 (North Macedonia) Nikita Antevska

Left Wingers

- 17 (North Macedonia) Mateja Jovanovska
- 19 (North Macedonia) Melanija Jovanovska
- 33 (North Macedonia) Mila Memov

Line players

- 21 (North Macedonia) Sara Mladenovska
- 11 (North Macedonia) Andreja Serafimovic
- 7 (North Macedonia) Marija Petreska

Left Backs

- 22 (North Macedonia) Mihaela Nikolovska
- 20 (North Macedonia) Angela Shehtanska

Central Backs

- 29 (North Macedonia) Nina Grabovica
- 24 (Portugal) Маriаnа Silvа Аzеvеdо
- 9 (North Macedonia) Nena Nestoroska

Right Backs

- 28 (Brazil) Amanda Stein
- 19 (North Macedonia) Ana Marija Dimitrovska
