= ŽRK Metalurg =

ЖРК Металург WHC Metalurg
- Full name: Women's Handball Club; Metalurg Skopje
- Founded: 1964
- Arena: Avtokomanda, Skopje
- Capacity: 2,000
- President: Tome Trenovski
- Head coach: Julijana Damchevska
- League: Skopsko Super League
- 2021-22: 3rd
- Club colours
Home	Away

WHC Metalurg (Macedonian: ЖРК Металург) is a women's handball club from Skopje, North Macedonia. The team currently competes in the Macedonian women's First League of Handball.

== History ==
The club was established in 1964 under the name MIK and played in the amateur handball league of SR Macedonia. In the seasons 1967 ,1968 and 1970 MIK became winner of the handball league of SR Macedonia. In 1973 the club was renamed to RK Skopje. Finally in 1975, RK Skopje achieved their greatest success, participation in the First Yugoslav Handball League. In 1978, RK Skopje won the Yugoslav Cup for the territory of SR Macedonia. From then until the dissolution of former Yugoslavia, RK Skopje played in the Second Yugoslav Handball League.

After the independence of Macedonia in 1991, RK Skopje competed in the Macedonian women's First League of Handball, and the club played in the EHF Women's Cup Winners' Cup in 1994 and in the Women's EHF Challenge Cup the following year.

In the season 2007/08 the club got a strong sponsor, and under the name ŽRK Metalurg Skopje, unbeaten entered in the Macedonian women's First League of Handball. In the 2009/10 season ŽRK Metalurg Skopje won the Macedonian Championship and the Macedonian Cup without losing a point. The following season the club again won the league title and domestic cup. In the 2011–12 season, they had their best showing in Europe by making it to the Last 16 of the Women's EHF Cup Winners' Cup. They followed that up with their third straight domestic double crown.

After long domination of WHC Vardar in the season 2018-19 WHC Metalurg Skopje made a big come back winning the championship of Macedonia again. They have reached the final of the Macedonian cup, but lost the final game against WHC Kumanovo.

In the 2021–2022 season, after nine years, Metalurg reached the National Cup Final Four. Competing against more experienced opponents, Metalurg won the Cup title for the sixth time. In the semifinals, they faced defending Cup winners and champions Kumanovo. After trailing 10–12 at halftime, they came back to win 25–21. In the final, Metalurg faced Gjorche Petrov, the team with the most trophies in the country. Although Gjorche Petrov were considered the favorites, Metalurg led 14–10 at halftime and maintained their advantage in the second half, winning 30–27. Eva Mladenovska, aged 15, was named the most valuable player of the final after scoring nine goals, adding to her 10 goals in the semifinal.

== Arena ==
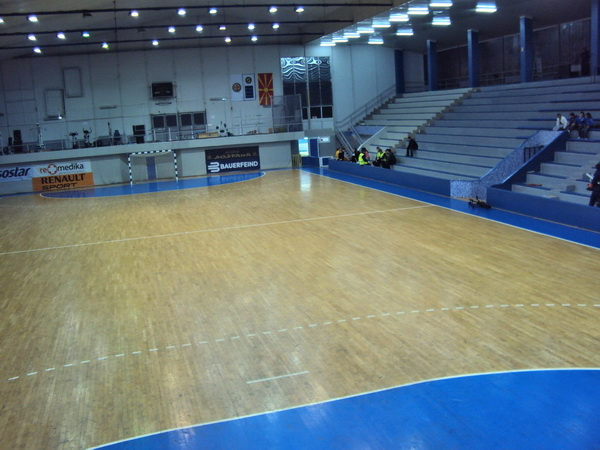

Avtokomanda (Macedonian: "Автокоманда") is an indoor sports arena located in Skopje, owned and used by Metalurg handball club. It's a small arena with its own fitness center and canteen restaurant. It has a capacity of 2500 people, 2000 seated and 500 standing.

== Accomplishments ==
- Championship of Macedonia (North Macedonia)

Winners Gold (8): 1967, 1968,1970, 1985, 2010, 2011, 2012, 2019

- Macedonian Cup (North Macedonia)

Winners Gold (6): 1978,2010, 2011, 2012, 2013, 2022

- Challenge Cup (Europe)

Semi-Finalist Bronze (1): 2009/10

- WRHL Women (Europe)

Finalist Silver (1) : 2011/12
Third place Bronze (1) : 2009/10

== European record ==
Season	Competition	Round	Club	1st leg	2nd leg	Aggregate
2017–18	Challenge Cup	R3	(Spain) Rincón Fertilidad Málaga	14–31	14–37	28–68

== Team ==
=== Current squad ===
Squad for the 2025–26 season

WHC Metalurg Skopje

Goalkeepers

- 1 (North Macedonia) Sofija Geshovska
- 12 (North Macedonia) Anastasija Todorova
- 16 (North Macedonia) Mila Vaseva

Right Wingers

- 9 (North Macedonia) Elena Ivanovska
- 33 (North Macedonia) Jana Gjoshevska
- 91 (North Macedonia) Sara Ristovska

Left Wingers

- 8 (North Macedonia) Anastasija Nikolovska
- 15 (North Macedonia) Marija Tasevska
- 99 (North Macedonia) Mina Gjurchevska

Line players

- 7 (North Macedonia) Marija Petreska
- 13 (North Macedonia) Aleksandra Kolovska

Left Backs

- 32 (North Macedonia) Iva Bozhinoska
- 31 (North Macedonia) Jana Kalajdzievska
- 11 (North Macedonia) Marija Jankulovska

Central Backs

- 4 (Croatia) Petra Jershek
- 18 (North Macedonia) Ivana Arsenievska
- 36 (North Macedonia) Nena Nestoska

Right Backs

- 19 (North Macedonia) Iva Mladenovska
- 10 (North Macedonia) Ana Marija Kolarovska
- 5 (North Macedonia) Marija Guguljanova

=== Technical staff ===
- (North Macedonia) Head Coach: Julijana Damchevska
- (North Macedonia) Assistant Coach: Krsto Petrushevski
- (North Macedonia) Physiotherapist: Filip Jovanovski
- (North Macedonia) Director: Filip Hristov
