= Macedonian Women's Handball Cup =

Annual handball tournament

- Sport: Handball
- Founded: 1993
- Country: North Macedonia
- Continent: Europe
- Most recent champion: ŽRK Kumanovo
- Most titles: Kometal Gjorče Petrov (16)
- Broadcaster: MRT
- Website: macedoniahandball.com.mk/

The Macedonian Women's Handball Cup (Macedonian: Ракометен куп на Македонија, romanized: Rakometen kup na Makedonija), is an elimination handball tournament held annually in North Macedonia since 1993. It is the second most important national title in Macedonian handball after the Macedonian First League. Kometal Gjorče Petrov holds the record for most titles won with 16.

== Season by season ==
Below is a list of Macedonian Cup winners since the season 1993.

Season	Champion
1993	Kometal Gjorche Petrov
1994	ŽRK Vardar
1995	Kometal Gjorche Petrov
1996	Kometal Gjorche Petrov
1997	Kometal Gjorche Petrov
1998	Kometal Gjorche Petrov
1999	Kometal Gjorche Petrov
2000	Kometal Gjorche Petrov
2001	Kometal Gjorche Petrov
2002	Kometal Gjorche Petrov
2003	Kometal Gjorche Petrov
2004	Kometal Gjorche Petrov
2005	Kometal Gjorche Petrov
2006	Kometal Gjorche Petrov
2007	Kometal Gjorche Petrov

Season	Champion
2008	Kometal Gjorche Petrov
2009	Kometal Gjorche Petrov
2010	ŽRK Metalurg
2011	ŽRK Metalurg
2012	ŽRK Metalurg
2013	ŽRK Metalurg
2014	ŽRK Vardar
2015	ŽRK Vardar
2016	ŽRK Vardar
2017	ŽRK Vardar
2018	ŽRK Vardar
2019	ŽRK Kumanovo
2021	ŽRK Kumanovo
2022	ŽRK Metalurg
2023	ŽRK Kumanovo
2024	WHC Gjorche Petrov
2025	WHC Gjorche Petrov

== Trophies by Club ==
Club	Winners	Winning seasons
Kometal Gjorče Petrov	18	1993, 1995, 1996, 1997, 1998, 1999, 2000, 2001, 2002, 2003, 2004, 2005, 2006, 2007, 2008, 2009, 2024, 2025
ŽRK Vardar	6	1994, 2014, 2015, 2016, 2017, 2018
ŽRK Metalurg	5	2010, 2011, 2012, 2013, 2022
ŽRK Kumanovo	3	2019, 2021, 2023

== See also ==
- Macedonian First League
- Macedonian Men's Handball Cup
