= Macedonian women's First League of Handball =

Women's handball competition in North Macedonia

- Founded: 1992
- No. of teams: 8
- Country: North Macedonia
- Confederation: EHF
- Most titles: WHC Gjorche Petrov (18)
- Broadcaster: MRT
- International cups: Champions League; EHF Cup; Challenge Cup
- Website: macedoniahandball.com.mk

The Macedonian women's First League of Handball (Macedonian: Македонска Женска ракометна супер лига;) is the top-tier team handball competition in the Republic of North Macedonia, governed by the Macedonian Handball Federation.

== 2016/2017 Skopsko Super Liga ==
Team	City
ŽRK Vardar	Skopje
ŽRK Metalurg	Skopje
Vardar 2	Skopje
ŽRK Kumanovo	Kumanovo
ŽRK Prilep	Prilep
ŽRK Gevgelija	Gevgelija
ŽRK Ovce Pole	Sveti Nikole
ŽRK Pelister	Bitola

== Champions ==
=== Winners by season ===
Season	Champion
1992–93	Kometal Gjorche Petrov
1993–94	Kometal Gjorche Petrov
1994–95	Kometal Gjorche Petrov
1995–96	Kometal Gjorche Petrov
1996–97	Kometal Gjorche Petrov
1997–98	Kometal Gjorche Petrov
1998–99	Kometal Gjorche Petrov
1999–00	Kometal Gjorche Petrov
2000–01	Kometal Gjorche Petrov
2001–02	Kometal Gjorche Petrov
2002–03	Kometal Gjorche Petrov
2003–04	Kometal Gjorche Petrov
2004–05	Kometal Gjorche Petrov
2005–06	Kometal Gjorche Petrov
2006–07	Kometal Gjorche Petrov
2007–08	Kometal Gjorche Petrov
2008–09	Kometal Gjorche Petrov
2009–10	ŽRK Metalurg
2010–11	ŽRK Metalurg
2011–12	ŽRK Metalurg
2012–13	ŽRK Vardar
2013–14	ŽRK Vardar
2014–15	ŽRK Vardar
2015–16	ŽRK Vardar
2016–17	ŽRK Vardar
2017–18	ŽRK Vardar
2018–19	ŽRK Metalurg
2019–20	ŽRK Kumanovo
2020–21	ŽRK Kumanovo
2021–22	WHC Gjorche Petrov
2022–23	WHC Gjorche Petrov
2023–24	WHC Gjorche Petrov
2024–25	WHC Gjorche Petrov

=== Performances ===
Club	Winners	Winning seasons
WHC Gjorche Petrov	21	1992-93, 1993-94, 1994–95, 1995–96, 1996–97, 1997–98, 1998–99, 1999-00, 2000–01, 2001–02, 2002–03, 2003–04, 2004–05, 2005–06, 2006–07, 2007–08, 2008–09, 2021–22, 2022–23, 2023-24,2024-25
ŽRK Vardar	6	2012–13, 2013–14, 2014–15, 2015–16, 2016–17, 2017–18
ŽRK Metalurg	4	2009-10, 2010–11, 2011–12, 2018–19
ŽRK Kumanovo	2	2019-20, 2020-21
