= 2026–27 Turkish Women's Handball Super League =

- League: Turkish Women's Handball Super League
- Sport: Handball
- Duration: 30 August 2026 – May 2027
- Teams: 8

Turkish Women's Handball Super League seasons
- ← 2025–26 2027–28 →

The 2026–27 Turkish Women's Handball Super League, was the 48th edition of the top-level Women's Handball league in Turkey. The competition was organised by the Turkish Handball Federation.

General guidelines regarding participation in the leagues were published on June 1st.

A total of eight teams contest this season's league, which began on 30 August 2026 and is scheduled to conclude in May 2027.

It will be played according to the double round-robin league system. The fixtures were released on 11 August 2026.

== Regular season ==
The regular season will play by 8 teams over 14 matches.

Pos	Team	Pld	W	D	L	GF	GA	GD	Pts	Qualification or relegation
1	Üsküdar Bld.	10	8	0	2	312	286	+26	16	Championship stage
2	Yozgat GSK	10	7	1	2	343	300	+43	15	Championship stage
3	Yalıkavak	9	6	1	2	279	225	+54	13	Championship stage
4	Manisa Büyükşehir Belediyespor	9	6	1	2	300	258	+42	13	Championship stage
5	Bursa BB	10	5	2	3	314	287	+27	12	Classification stage
6	Odunpazarı	10	3	0	7	297	298	−1	6	Classification stage
7	Göztepe	10	1	1	8	297	322	−25	3	Classification stage
8	Ortahisar Bld.	10	0	0	10	248	414	−166	0	Classification stage

Updated to match(es) played on 15 November 2026. Source: THF

=== Fixture and Results ===
==== First Half (Weeks 1-7) ====
Week 1

30 August 2026	Göztepe	30 – 30	Bursa BB	(report)

30 August 2026	Yozgat GSK	31 – 25	Odunpazarı	(report)

30 August 2026	Üsküdar Bld.	31 – 33	Manisa BB	(report)

30 August 2026	Ortahisar Bld.	17 – 36	Yalıkavak	(report)

Week 2

5 September 2026	Odunpazarı	24 – 28	Üsküdar Bld.	(report)

5 September 2026	Bursa BB	31 – 29	Yozgat GSK	(report)

5 September 2026	Yalıkavak	32 – 24	Göztepe	(report)

8 September 2026	Manisa BB	45 – 30	Ortahisar Bld.	(report)

Week 3

13 September 2026	Yozgat GSK	35 – 31	Göztepe	(report)

13 September 2026	Üsküdar Bld.	27 – 30	Bursa BB	(report)

13 September 2026	Ortahisar Bld.	29 – 36	Odunpazarı	(report)

13 September 2026	Manisa BB	24 – 23	Yalıkavak	(report)

Week 4

19 September 2026	Odunpazarı	23 – 29	Manisa BB	(report)

19 September 2026	Bursa BB	46 – 30	Ortahisar Bld.	(report)

19 September 2026	Göztepe	29 – 34	Üsküdar Bld.	(report)

19 September 2026	Yalıkavak	30 – 30	Yozgat GSK	(report)

Week 5

3 October 2026	Üsküdar Bld.	39 – 38	Yozgat GSK	(report)

3 October 2026	Ortahisar Bld.	24 – 42	Göztepe	(report)

14 October 2026	Manisa BB	28 – 28	Bursa BB	(report)

14 October 2026	Yalıkavak	31 – 27	Odunpazarı	(report)

Week 6

11 October 2026	Göztepe	30 – 35	Manisa BB	(report)

11 October 2026	Yozgat GSK	43 – 23	Ortahisar Bld.	(report)

28 October 2026	Bursa BB	34 – 30	Odunpazarı	(report)

28 October 2026	Üsküdar Bld.	24 – 21	Yalıkavak	(report)

Week 7

17 October 2026	Odunpazarı	29 – 26	Göztepe	(report)

17 October 2026	Ortahisar Bld.	26 – 36	Üsküdar Bld.	(report)

17 October 2026	Manisa BB	37 – 41	Yozgat GSK	(report)

17 October 2026	Yalıkavak	28 – 27	Bursa BB	(report)

==== Second Half (Weeks 8-14) ====
Week 8

31 October 2026	Yalıkavak	45 – 23	Ortahisar Bld.	(report)

1 November 2026	Bursa BB	35 – 27	Göztepe	(report)

1 November 2026	Odunpazarı	30 – 34	Yozgat GSK	(report)

1 November 2026	Manisa BB	27 – 28	Üsküdar Bld.	(report)

Week 9

7 November 2026	Ortahisar Bld.	24 – 42	Manisa BB	(report)

7 November 2026	Göztepe	29 – 33	Yalıkavak	(report)

8 November 2026	Üsküdar Bld.	34 – 30	Odunpazarı	(report)

8 November 2026	Yozgat GSK	27 – 25	Bursa BB	(report)

Week 10

14 November 2026	Bursa BB	28 – 31	Üsküdar Bld.	(report)

14 November 2026	Odunpazarı	43 – 22	Ortahisar Bld.	(report)

15 November 2026	Göztepe	29 – 35	Yozgat GSK	(report)

27 December 2026	Yalıkavak	–	Manisa BB	(report)

Week 11

3 January 2027	Manisa BB	–	Odunpazarı	(report)

3 January 2027	Ortahisar Bld.	–	Bursa BB	(report)

3 January 2027	Üsküdar Bld.	–	Göztepe	(report)

3 January 2027	Yozgat GSK	–	Yalıkavak	(report)

Week 12

9 January 2027	Yozgat GSK	–	Üsküdar Bld.	(report)

9 January 2027	Göztepe	–	Ortahisar Bld.	(report)

9 January 2027	Bursa BB	–	Manisa BB	(report)

9 January 2027	Odunpazarı	–	Yalıkavak	(report)

Week 13

16 January 2027	Odunpazarı	–	Bursa BB	(report)

16 January 2027	Manisa BB	–	Göztepe	(report)

16 January 2027	Ortahisar Bld.	–	Yozgat GSK	(report)

16 January 2027	Yalıkavak	–	Üsküdar Bld.	(report)

Week 14

23 January 2027	Göztepe	–	Odunpazarı	(report)

23 January 2027	Üsküdar Bld.	–	Ortahisar Bld.	(report)

23 January 2027	Yozgat GSK	–	Manisa BB	(report)

23 January 2027	Bursa BB	–	Yalıkavak	(report)

== Gallery ==
Üsküdar Bld. vs Yozgat GSK pre-match ceremony in October 2026

== Turkish clubs in European competitions ==
Türkiye will be represented by 3 teams in European cups.

Team	Competition	Progress
Bursa BB	EHF European League	Round 2
Yalıkavak	EHF European Cup	Round 3
Odunpazarı	EHF European Cup	Round 2
