= Konyaaltı Bld. SK =

Turkish handball club

Konyaalı Bld. SK
- Full name: Konyaaltı Belediyesi Spor Kulübü
- Founded: 1991; 34 years ago
- Arena: Akdeniz University Sports Hall, Blue Hall
- Capacity: 450
- President: Ramazan Karabulut
- Head coach: Birol Ünsal
- League: Turkish Women's Handball Super League

Konyaaltı Bld. SK (Turkish: Konyaaltı Belediyesi Spor Kulübü), also known as Konyaaltı BSK, is a Turkish professional women's handball club from Konyaaltı in Antalya.

Founded in 1991, the club plays in the Turkish Women's Handball Super League. Club chairman is Ramazan Karabulut and the head coach is Birol Ünsal. The team plays their home matches at Akdeniz University Sports Hall, Blue Hall.

The team played the final round of the 2022–23 Women's EHF European Cup against Spanish club CB Atlético Guardés, lost the first leg by 17–23, won the second leg by 33–20, and took the cup in aggregate by 50–43. Konyaaltı BSK became so the first Turkish women's handball club to win the European Cup.

== European record ==
| Season | Competition | Round | Club | 1st leg | 2nd leg | Aggregate |
|---|---|---|---|---|---|---|
| 2022–23 | EHF Cup | F | (Spain) CB Atlético Guardés | 17–23 | 33–20 | 50–43 |

== Trophies ==
- EHF European Cup
  - Winners (1): 2023

== Current squad ==
Squad for the 2023–24 season.

Goalkeepers

- 01 (Cameroon) Noelle Mben
- 18 (Turkey) Yağmur Bembeyaz
- 39 (Turkey) Sevilay İmamoğlu Öcal

Wingers
LW

- 17 (Turkey) Ceylan Aydemir

RW

- 13 (Turkey) Bilgenur Öztürk
- 69 (Ukraine) Oleksandra Furmanets

Pivots

- 7 (North Macedonia) Ivana Gakidova
- 27 (Russia) Valeriia Baranik

Back players

- 02 (Brazil) Samara Vieira
- 10 (North Macedonia) Monika Janeska
- 11 (Turkey) Döne Gul Bozdoğan
- 23 (Turkey) Diğdem Hoşgör
- 30 (Russia) Alena Ikhneva
- 61 (Turkey) Edanur Çetin
- 81 (North Macedonia) Elena Gjeorgjievska

=== Transfers ===
Transfers for the 2023–24 season

Joining

- (Turkey) Beyza Irem Türkoglu (LW)
- (Turkey) Diğdem Hoşgör (LB)
- (Brazil) Samara Vieira (LB)
- (Russia) Valeriia Baranik (PV)
- (North Macedonia) Elena Gjeorgjievska (RB)

Leaving

- (Turkey) Halime Tuana Arslan (PV)
- (Turkey) Yasemin Şahin (CB)
- (Turkey) Cansu Akalın (PV)
- (Turkey) Sinem Vatan (LB)
- (Turkey) Beyzanur Türkyılmaz (LW)
- (Montenegro) Sanja Premović (RB)
