= Binnaz Karakaya Sports Hall =

Indoor arena in Muğla, Turkey

Binnaz Karakaya Sports Hall Binnaz Karakaya Spor Salonu
- Interactive map of Binnaz Karakaya Sports Hall; Binnaz Karakaya Spor Salonu
- Location: Gümbet, Bodrum, Muğla Province, Turkey
- Coordinates: 37.037148°N 27.408048°E
- Operator: Bodrum Municipality
- Capacity: 450

Construction
- Opened: 2005; 21 years ago

Tenants
- Yalıkavak Women's Handball, Bodrımspor Women's Volleyball

Binnaz Karakaya Sports Hall (Turkish: Binnaz Karakaya Spor Salonu) is a multi-purpose indoor arena for basketball, handball and volleyball competitions located in Muğla, Turkey. Owned by the Bodrum Municipality, the venue was opened in 2005. It has a seating capacity of 450.

The venue is located at Cevat Şakir Mah., Kartal Sok. 3 in Gümbet, Bodrum of Muğla Province, southwestern Turkey. The multi-sport arena hosts men's (all age categories) and women's Regional Basketball League matches, women's (all age categories) RegionalVoll and women's First Volleyball League matches, as well as women's Handball Super League matches. Festivities and festivals are also held in the venue. The women's handball team Yalıkavak SK, and the women's volleyball team Bodurm Bld. Bodrumspor play their home matches at the arena.

In February 2025, the floor of the sports hall was renovated.
