= Bilgenur Öztürk =

Turkish handball player (born 1999)

Personal information
- Nationality: Turkish
- Born: 16 June 1999 (age 27) Istanbul, Turkey
- Height: 1.71 m (5 ft 7 in)

Sport
- Sport: Handball
- Position: Right wink
- Current club: Konyaaltı Bld. SK
- Number: 13

Senior clubs
- Years: Team
- 2013–: Üsküdar Bld. SK
- 2017–2021: Yenimahalle Bld. SK
- 2021–2022: Ankara Büyükşehir Bld. Ego SK
- 2022–: Konyaaltı Bld. SK
National team
- Years: Team
- –: Turkey
Medal record
Representing Turkey
Women's Handball
Islamic Solidarity Games
Gold medal – first place	2021 Konya	Team

Bilgenur Öztürk (born 16 June 1999) is a Turkish handballer, who plays as right wing for Konyaaltı Bld. SK in the Turkish Super League, and the Turkey national team.

== Personal life ==
Bilgenur Öztürk was born in Istanbul, Turkey on 16 June 1999.

== Club career ==
Öztürk is 1.71 m (5 ft 7 in) tall at 71 kg (157 lb). She plays in the right wing position.

=== Üsküdar Bld. GSK ===
Öztürk started playing handball at Üsküdar Bld. SK in her hometown Istanbul. She took part in the EHF Women's Cup Winners' Cup 2013/14.

=== Yenimahalle Bld. SK ===
In the 2017–18 Turkish Super League, she moved to Ankara and joined Yenimahalle SK. The team was standing at the second ranking position in the 2019–20 Turkish Super League, as the Turkey Handball Federation decided not to continue the league further due to the COVID-19 pandemic in Turkey, and did not announce any ranking. Her club extended her contract in June 2020 for the 2020–21 Turkish Super League season. For the 2021–22 season, she renewed her deal with the club.

She played at the 2017–18 EHF Cup, and the EHF Challenge Cup in 2018–19, and 2019–20.

=== Ankara Büyükşehir Bld. Ego SK ===
End May 2021, she signed with the Ankara Büyükşehir Bld. Rgo SK, which was recently promoted to the Turkish Super League. She played in the first half of the 2021–22 season.

In August 2021, she was honored by the Hentbol Haber with the Bests of Handball award for her successful appearance as pivot in the 2020–21 Turkish Super League.

=== Konyaaltı Bld. SK ===
In February 2022, she transferred to the Antalya-based club Konyaaltı Bld. SK. She extended herrelationship with the club in the beginning of July 2022 for the 2022–23 season.

Öztürk participated at the 2022–23 EHF European Cup.

== International career ==
Öztürk is a member of the Turkey national team. In 2022, she played in the national team, which became champion at the 5th Islamic Solidarity Games in Konya, Turkey.

== Honours ==
=== Individual ===
Turkish Women's Handball Super League
Golden Seven member (1): 2022–223 (Konyaaltı Bld. SK)

=== Club ===
Turkish Women's Handball Super League
Women's EHF European Cup

Konyaaltı Bld. S

Champion (1): 2022–23

=== International ===
Turkey women's national handball team

Islamic Solidarity Games
Champion (1): 2021.
