= Celal =

Celal is both a masculine Turkish given name and a surname. It is the Turkish form of the Arabic word Jalal (جلال), which means "majesty". Notable people with the name include:

== Given name ==
- Celal Al (born 1984), Turkish actor
- Celal Adan (born 1951), Turkish politician
- Celal Esat Arseven (1875–1971), Turkish painter, writer and politician
- Celal Atik (1918–1979), Turkish sports wrestler
- Celal Başkale (died 2012), Kurdish militant
- Celâl Bayar (1883–1986), Turkish politician and economist
- Celal Emir Dede (born 2001), Turkish footballer
- Cəlal Hüseynov (born 2003), Azerbaijani footballer
- Celal İbrahim (1884–1917), Ottoman football player
- Celal Kıbrızlı (born 1950), Turkish footballer and manager
- Celal Nuri İleri (1881–1938), Turkish politician
- Celal Taşkıran (born 1954), Turkish wrestler
- Celal Tevfik Karasapan (1899–1974), Turkish diplomat and politician
- Celal Şahin (1925–2018), Turkish musician and humorist
- Celal Sandal (1942–2006), Turkish boxer
- Celâl Şengör (born 1955), Turkish geologist
- Celal Yardımcı (1911–1986), Turkish lawyer and politician
- Hasan Celal Güzel (1945–2018), Turkish politician
- Mehmet Celal Bey (1863–1926), Ottoman statesman

== Surname ==
- Nariman Celâl (born 1980), Crimean Tatar politician, journalist and activist
- Peride Celal (1916–2013), Turkish female novelist, story writer

== Other uses ==
- Celal Atik Sports Hall, multi-sports indoor venue in İzmir, Turkey
- Celal ile Ceren, 2013 Turkish film
