= Baranik =

Baranik is a surname. Notable people with the surname include:

- Dan Baranik (born 1962), American football coach
- Rudolf Baranik (1920–1998), Lithuania-American artist, educator, and writer
- Valeriia Baranik (born 1993), Russian female handballer
