= Sancak =

Sancak may refer to:

- Sanjak, an administrative unit of the Ottoman Empire
- Sandžak, a historical region in Serbia and Montenegro

== People ==
- Nurşah Sancak (born 1997), Turkish female handball player
- Sancak Kaplan (born 1982), Turkish footballer
- Yasin Sancak (born 1978), Turkish volleyball player
