= Yağmur Bembeyaz =

Turkish handball player (born 1999)

Personal information
- Born: June 25, 1999 (age 27) Ankara, Turkey
- Height: 1.83 m (6 ft 0 in)

Sport
- Sport: Handball
- Position: Goalkeeper
- Current club: Yalıkavak
- Number: 22

Senior clubs
- Years: Team
- 2018–2020: Yenimahalle Bld. SK
- 2021–2022: EGO Spor
- 2022–2024: Konyaaltı Bld.
- 2024–2025: Üsküdar Bld.
- 2025–: Yalıkavak

Yağmur Bembeyaz (born 25 June 1999) is a Turkish female handballer in the goalkeeper position. She is a member of the Bodrum-based club Yalıkavak, which play in the Handball Super League.

== Personal life ==
Born on 25 June 1999, Yağmur Bembeyaz is a native of Ankara, Turkey.

== Club career ==
Bembeyaz plays in the goalkeeper position. She is 1.83 m (6 ft 0 in) tall at 92 kg (203 lb).

She played for Yenimahalle Bld. SK in her hometown from 2018 until 2020. For Yenimahalle Bld. SK, she took part in the Women's EHF Challenge Cup in 2018–19, and 2019–20 tournaments. For the 2021–22 season, she transferred to EGO Spor in Ankara. The next season, she moved to Konyaaltı Bld. SK in Antalya, which plays in the Super League. Her team won the 2022–23 Women's EHF European Cup.

In the 2024–25 Turkish Super League season, she was with the Istanbul-based club Üsküdar Bld.. The next season, she transferred to Yalıkavak in Bodrım, Muğla.

== International career ==
In April 2022, Bembeyaz was called up to the preparation camp of the national team for the 2022 European Women's Handball Championship qualification.

== Honours ==
Turkish Women's Handball Super League

Konyaaltı Bld. SK
Runners-up (1): 2022–23.
Third places (1): 2023–24.

Turkish Women's Handball Super Cup

Konyaaltı Bld. SK
Finalists (1): 2022

Yalıkavak SK
Finalists (1): 2025.

Turkish Women's Handball Cup

Konyaaltı Bld. SK
Winners )1): 2023–24.
