= Göztepe S.K. (women's handball) =

Turkish handball club

Göztepe S.K. Women's Handball
- Full name: Göztepe Spor Kulübü Kadın Hentbol Takımı
- Nickname: Göz-Göz
- Short name: Göztepe S.K.
- Founded: 1925; 101 years ago
- Arena: Celal Atik Sports Hall
- League: Turkish Women's Handball Super League
- Club colours

Göztepe S.K. Women's Handball (Turkish: Göztepe Spor Kulübü Kadın Hentbol Takımı) is the women's handball team of the same named multi-sports club based in İzmir, western Turkey. The team competes in the Turkish Super League. Club colours are yellow and red. They are nicknamed Göz-Göz (literally: "Eye-Eye")

The newly founded women's handball branch of the club was admitted to the Turkish Super League for the 2025–26 season to debut on 7 September 2025.

== Location ==
The club is named after the neighborhood Göztepe of Konak District in İzmir, Turkey.

== Arena ==
Göztepe S.K. women's handball play their home matches at Celal Atik Sports Hall situated at 9 Eylül Sqıare in Konak, İzmir.

== Current squad ==
=== Players ===
Team members at the 2025–26 Turkish Women's Handball Super League:

- 1 (Turkey) Buse Keten (GK)
- 6 (Turkey) İrem Can İnce
- 7 (Turkey) Sevil Ay (LP)
- 9 (Turkey) Berfin Zengin (LW)
- 10 (Turkey) Özge Yakar (CB)
- 12 (Turkey) Serpil Abdiğğlu (GK) (C)
- 14 (Turkey) Nehirnaz Poyraz
- 18 (Turkey) Esin Sağdıç (LB)
- 19 (Turkey) Demet Sonkaya
- 20 (Turkey) Kumsal Özer
- 25 (Turkey) Sena Şentürk (RB)
- 27 (Turkey) Gizem Buse Dallı
- 29 (Turkey) Zeynep Onur
- 67 (Turkey) Zehra Eker
- 77 (Turkey) Sude Naz Dağ (RW)
- 84 (Turkey) Azra Öztür

== See also ==
- Göztepe Men's Handball
