= Ortahisar Bld. SK =

Turkish handball club

- Full name: Ortahisar Belediyesi Spor Kulübü
- Founded: 12 June 2018; 8 years ago
- Arena: Trabzon Beşirli Sports Hall
- President: Ayhan Yılmaz Öztürk
- League: Turkish Women's Handball Super League
- 2024–25: 4th
- Club colours

Location of Adasokağı SK in Turkey

Ortahisar Bld. SK (Turkish: Ortahisar Belediyesiı Spor Kulübü) is a women's handball club based in Ortahisar district of Trabzon Province, Turkey and sponsored by the district municipality. The team competes in the Turkish Super League. Club colours are burgundy, blue and navy. Club president is AAyhan Yılmaz Öztürk.

== Location ==
Ortahisar Bld. SK is located on Kahramanmaraş Cad. 98 in Pazarkap Mah. of Ortahisar, Trabzon Province, northeastern Turkey.

== Arena ==
Ortahisar Bld. play their home matches at Trabzon Beşirli Sports Hall located at 2 No.lu Beşirli, Yavuz Selim Blv. 543/A in Ortahisar, Trabzon.zref name="thf0"/>

== History ==
Ortahisar Bld. SK was founded on 12 June 2018.

=== 2023–24 season ===
Ortahisar Bld. finished the 2023–24 Turkish Women's Handball First League season as group leader. After play-offs, they became league champion and were promoted to the Super League.

=== 2024–25 season ===
The team finished the 2024–25 Turkish Super League season on fourth place after the play-offs.

Ortahisar Bld. lost the finals match of the 2024–25 Turkish Women's Handball Cup to Bursa Büyükşehir Bld., and became the runner-up.

== Current squad ==
As of 2024-25 Turkish Women's Handball Super League season:

=== Technical staff ===
- Head coach:

=== Players ===
As of 2025–26 season.

- 5 (Turkey) Perihan Topaloğlu Acar (LW)
- 10 (Turkey) Feyza Nur Öztürk (RW)
- 11 (Turkey) Özge Zaman (LW)
- 13 (Montenegro) Dajana Miljanic
- 15 (Turkey) Doğa Harmancı Öykü
- 16 (Turkey) Hira Nur Öztürk (GK)
- 17 (Turkey) Kübra Sarıkaya (LW)
- 21 (Turkey) Arife Özdemir CLB)
- 23 (Turkey) Şükran Beytekin
- 35 (Turkey) Halime İslamoğlu (GK)
- 37 (North Macedonia) Monika Janeska (CB)
- 55 (Turkey) Nisan Çakar
- 59 (Cameroon) Michaella Eunice Magba (RW)
- 61 (Turkey) Kübra Akçayoğlu (RW)
- 88 (Turkey) Eylül Şilan Yalçın (RW)

Legend:

- GK: Goalkeeper
- LW: Left winger
- RW: Right winger
- LP: Line Player
- CB: Center back
- LB: Left back
- RB: Right back

== Former notable players ==
- Brazil Elaine Gomes (P)
- Cameroon Noelle Mben (GK)

== Kit history ==
2024–25 home

== Honours ==
Turkish Women's Handball First League

Champions (1): 2023–24

Turkish Women's Handball Cup

Runners-up (1): 2024–25
