= 2019–20 Women's EHF Challenge Cup =

Women's EHF Challenge Cup
- 2019–20

Tournament information
- Sport: Handball
- Dates: 9 November 2019–~~10 May 2020~~
- Teams: 27
- Website: eurohandball.com

Final positions
- Champions: cancelled

Tournament statistics
- Top scorer(s): (Spain) Ona Vegué (30 goals)

The 2019–20 Women's EHF Challenge Cup is the 23rd edition of the European Handball Federation's third-tier competition for women's handball clubs, running from 9 November 2019. On 24 April 2020 EHF announced that the competition would be cancelled due to COVID-19 pandemic.

== Overview ==
=== Team allocation ===
There will be no matches in Round 1 and 2 and 22 teams will start in Round 3 with the first leg scheduled for 10–11 November and second leg for 17–18 November 2019, while 5 teams were directly seeded for the Last 16 round. The European Handball Federation rearranged the Last 16 phase of the Women's Challenge Cup 2019–20 after the Turkish club Ardeşen GSK withdrew from the competition. In order to harmonize the competition after the withdrawal of Ardeşen GSK, the EHF decided to award Aula Alimentos de Valladolid, as the best seeded team in the Women's Challenge Cup 2019–20 a place directly in the Quarterfinals.

Quarterfinals
(Spain) Aula Alimentos de Valladolid			
Last 16
(Croatia) RK Lokomotiva Zagreb	(Netherlands) JuRo Unirek VZV	(Serbia) HC Naisa Niš	
Round 3
(Portugal) AC Alavarium/Love Tiles	(Switzerland) DHB Rotweiss Thun	(Czech Republic) DHC Sokol Poruba	(North Macedonia) ŽRK Pelister
(Israel) Maccabi Rishon LeZion	(Belarus) HC BNTU-BelAZ Minsk	(Lithuania) ACME-Žalgiris Kaunas	(Bosnia and Herzegovina) WHC Hadžići DG
(Austria) HIB Handball Graz	(Greece) O.F.N. Ionias	(Italy) SSV Brixen Südtirol	(Montenegro) ORK Rudar
(Spain) Mecalia Atlético Guardés	(Croatia) ŽRK Bjelovar	(Turkey) Ankara Yenimahalle BSK	(Serbia) ŽRK Zaječar 1949
(Portugal) SIR 1º de Maio/ADA CJ Barros	(Bosnia and Herzegovina) ŽRK Krivaja	(Greece) A.C. Veria 2017	(Italy) Ariosto Pallamano Ferrara
(Spain) KH-7 BM Granollers	(Portugal) CS Madeira		

=== Round and draw dates ===
All draws were held at the European Handball Federation headquarters in Vienna, Austria. On 25 March, the EHF announced that no matches will be played before June due to the coronavirus pandemic.

Round	Draw date	First leg	Second leg
Round 3	16 July 2019	9-10 November 2019	16-17 November 2019
Last 16	19 November 2019	1-2 February 2020	8-9 February 2020
Quarter-final	11 February 2020	29 February-1 March 2020	7-8 March 2020
Semi-finals	11 February 2020	4-5 April 2020	11-12 April 2020
Final	14 April 2020	2-3 May 2020	9-10 May 2020

== Qualification stage ==
=== Round 3 ===
There were 22 teams participating in round 3. The draw seeding pots are composed as follows:

Pot 1	Pot 2
(Portugal) AC Alavarium/Love Tiles; (Switzerland) DHB Rotweiss Thun; (Czech Republic) DHC Sokol Poruba; (North Macedonia) ŽRK Pelister; (Israel) Maccabi Rishon LeZion; (Belarus) HC BNTU-BelAZ Minsk; (Lithuania) ACME-Žalgiris Kaunas; (Bosnia and Herzegovina) WHC Hadžići DG; (Austria) HIB Handball Graz; (Greece) O.F.N. Ionias; (Italy) SSV Brixen Südtirol	(Montenegro) ORK Rudar; (Spain) Mecalia Atlético Guardés; (Croatia) ŽRK Bjelovar; (Turkey) Ankara Yenimahalle BSK; (Serbia) ŽRK Zaječar 1949; (Portugal) SIR 1º de Maio/ADA CJ Barros; (Bosnia and Herzegovina) ŽRK Krivaja; (Greece) A.C. Veria 2017; (Italy) Ariosto Pallamano Ferrara; (Spain) KH-7 BM Granollers; (Portugal) CS Madeira

Teams listed first played the first leg at home. The first legs were played on 8–10 November and the second legs were played on 16–17 November 2019. Some teams agreed to play both matches in the same venue.

Team 1	Agg.	Team 2	1st leg	2nd leg
O.F.N. Ionias (Greece)	37–43 ^{1}	(Portugal) SIR 1º de Maio/ADA CJ Barros	19–28	18–15
ORK Rudar (Montenegro)	37–50	(Lithuania) ACME-Žalgiris Kaunas	19–26	18–24
WHC Hadžići DG (Bosnia and Herzegovina)	51–65 ^{2}	(Portugal) CS Madeira	23–37	28–28
KH-7 BM Granollers (Spain)	67–61	(Belarus) HC BNTU-BelAZ Minsk	34–29	33–32
A.C. Veria 2017 (Greece)	50–53 ^{3}	(Austria) HIB Handball Graz	23–27	27–26
DHC Sokol Poruba (Czech Republic)	52–51	(Turkey) Ankara Yenimahalle BSK	34–25	18–26
ŽRK Bjelovar (Croatia)	60–51 ^{4}	(Portugal) AC Alavarium/Love Tiles	28–23	32–28
DHB Rotweiss Thun (Switzerland)	34–47	(Spain) Mecalia Atlético Guardés	17–25	17–22
SSV Brixen Südtirol (Italy)	57–40	(Italy) Ariosto Pallamano Ferrara	31–18	26–22
ŽRK Krivaja (Bosnia and Herzegovina)	47–52 ^{5}	(Israel) Maccabi Rishon LeZion	25–21	22–31
ŽRK Zaječar 1949 (Serbia)	94–43 ^{6}	(North Macedonia) ŽRK Pelister	50–20	44–23

Notes

^{1} Both legs were hosted by SIR 1º de Maio/ADA CJ Barros.
^{2} Both legs were hosted by CS Madeira.
^{3} Both legs were hosted by HIB Handball Graz.
^{4} Both legs were hosted by ŽRK Bjelovar.
^{5} Both legs were hosted by ŽRK Krivaja.
^{6} Both legs were hosted by ŽRK Zaječar 1949.

== Last 16 ==
The European Handball Federation has decided 5 teams to proceed directly seeded for the Last 16 round. The European Handball Federation rearranged the Last 16 phase of the Women's Challenge Cup 2019–20 after the Turkish club Ardeşen GSK withdrew from the competition. In order to harmonize the competition after the withdrawal of Ardeşen GSK, the EHF decided to award Aula Alimentos de Valladolid, as the best seeded team in the Women's Challenge Cup 2019–20 a place directly in the Quarterfinals. The draw seeding pots were composed as follows:

Pot 1	Pot 2
(Croatia) RK Lokomotiva Zagreb; (Croatia) ŽRK Bjelovar; (Czech Republic) DHC Sokol Poruba; (Spain) Mecalia Atlético Guardés; (Netherlands) JuRo Unirek VZV; (Serbia) ŽRK Zaječar 1949; (Serbia) HC Naisa Niš	(Austria) HIB Handball Graz; (Spain) KH-7 BM Granollers; (Italy) SSV Brixen Südtirol; (Israel) Maccabi Rishon LeZion; (Lithuania) ACME-Žalgiris Kaunas; (Portugal) CS Madeira; (Portugal) SIR 1º de Maio/ADA CJ Barros

The draw for the Last 16 took place at the EHF Office in Vienna on Thursday 19 November 2019.

Teams listed first played the first leg at home. The first legs was played on 1–2 February and the second legs were played on 8–9 February 2020. Some teams agreed to play both matches in the same venue.

=== Overview ===
Team 1	Agg.	Team 2	1st leg	2nd leg
SIR 1º de Maio/ADA CJ Barros (Portugal)	37–60 ^{1}	(Croatia) RK Lokomotiva Zagreb	21–33	16–27
CS Madeira (Portugal)	61–33 ^{2}	(Serbia) ŽRK Zaječar 1949	37–19	25–14
Mecalia Atlético Guardés (Spain)	64–57 ^{3}	(Lithuania) ACME-Žalgiris Kaunas	30–23	34–34
DHC Sokol Poruba (Czech Republic)	42–72	(Spain) KH-7 BM Granollers	19–32	23–40
HIB Handball Graz (Austria)	38–60	(Serbia) HC Naisa Niš	14–30	24–30
JuRo Unirek VZV (Netherlands)	55–44	(Italy) SSV Brixen Südtirol	29–24	26–20
ŽRK Bjelovar (Croatia)	56–46 ^{4}	(Israel) Maccabi Rishon LeZion	23–25	33–21

Notes

^{1} Both legs were hosted by RK Lokomotiva Zagreb.
^{2} Both legs were hosted by CS Madeira.
^{3} Both legs were hosted by Mecalia Atlético Guardés.
^{4} Both legs were hosted by Maccabi Rishon LeZion.

==== Matches ====
1 February 2020; 18:00	SIR 1º de Maio/ADA CJ Barros (Portugal)	21–33	(Croatia) RK Lokomotiva Zagreb	Dom sportova 2, Zagreb; Attendance: 1,000; Referees: Kinnari, Skogberg (FIN)
1 February 2020; 18:00	Ferreira 6	(8–13)	Posavec 8	Dom sportova 2, Zagreb; Attendance: 1,000; Referees: Kinnari, Skogberg (FIN)
1 February 2020; 18:00	3× (yellow card) 5× (suspension)	Report	2× (yellow card) 7× (suspension)	Dom sportova 2, Zagreb; Attendance: 1,000; Referees: Kinnari, Skogberg (FIN)

2 February 2020; 18:00	RK Lokomotiva Zagreb (Croatia)	27–16	(Portugal) SIR 1º de Maio/ADA CJ Barros	Dom sportova 2, Zagreb; Attendance: 300; Referees: Kinnari, Skogberg (FIN)
2 February 2020; 18:00	Posavec 6	(9–5)	Fernandes 5	Dom sportova 2, Zagreb; Attendance: 300; Referees: Kinnari, Skogberg (FIN)
2 February 2020; 18:00	3× (yellow card) 4× (suspension)	Report	4× (yellow card) 6× (suspension)	Dom sportova 2, Zagreb; Attendance: 300; Referees: Kinnari, Skogberg (FIN)

RK Lokomotiva Zagreb won 60–37 on aggregate.

1 February 2020; 18:00	CS Madeira (Portugal)	37–19	(Serbia) ŽRK Zaječar 1949	Pavilhao Bartolomeu Perestrelo, Funchal; Attendance: 600; Referees: Fahner, Kubis (POL)
1 February 2020; 18:00	Gouveia 10	(18–9)	Belić 8	Pavilhao Bartolomeu Perestrelo, Funchal; Attendance: 600; Referees: Fahner, Kubis (POL)
1 February 2020; 18:00	2× (yellow card) 3× (suspension)	Report	2× (yellow card) 3× (suspension)	Pavilhao Bartolomeu Perestrelo, Funchal; Attendance: 600; Referees: Fahner, Kubis (POL)

2 February 2020; 18:00	ŽRK Zaječar 1949 (Serbia)	14–25	(Portugal) CS Madeira	Pavilhao Bartolomeu Perestrelo, Funchal; Attendance: 400; Referees: Fahner, Kubis (POL)
2 February 2020; 18:00	Milošević 6	(7–14)	Freitas 6	Pavilhao Bartolomeu Perestrelo, Funchal; Attendance: 400; Referees: Fahner, Kubis (POL)
2 February 2020; 18:00	3× (suspension)	Report	3× (yellow card) 1× (suspension)	Pavilhao Bartolomeu Perestrelo, Funchal; Attendance: 400; Referees: Fahner, Kubis (POL)

CS Madeira won 61–33 on aggregate.

1 February 2020; 19:00	Mecalia Atlético Guardés (Spain)	30–23	(Lithuania) ACME-Žalgiris Kaunas	A Sangriña, Pontevedra; Attendance: 400; Referees: Beulakker, Gilis (BEL)
1 February 2020; 19:00	Santiago 6	(14–13)	Kniubaite 9	A Sangriña, Pontevedra; Attendance: 400; Referees: Beulakker, Gilis (BEL)
1 February 2020; 19:00	3× (yellow card) 4× (suspension)	Report	2× (yellow card) 3× (suspension)	A Sangriña, Pontevedra; Attendance: 400; Referees: Beulakker, Gilis (BEL)

2 February 2020; 19:00	ACME-Žalgiris Kaunas (Lithuania)	34–34	(Spain) Mecalia Atlético Guardés	A Sangriña, Pontevedra; Attendance: 400; Referees: Beulakker, Gilis (BEL)
2 February 2020; 19:00	Kniubaite 12	(15–16)	Campos 8	A Sangriña, Pontevedra; Attendance: 400; Referees: Beulakker, Gilis (BEL)
2 February 2020; 19:00	4× (yellow card) 6× (suspension)	Report	2× (yellow card) 5× (suspension)	A Sangriña, Pontevedra; Attendance: 400; Referees: Beulakker, Gilis (BEL)

Mecalia Atlético Guardés won 64–57 on aggregate.

1 February 2020; 18:00	DHC Sokol Poruba (Czech Republic)	19–32	(Spain) KH-7 BM Granollers	Sportovní hala Ostrava, Moravská Ostrava; Attendance: 550; Referees: Kulović, Škaljić (BIH)
1 February 2020; 18:00	Polášková 8	(14–17)	González 7	Sportovní hala Ostrava, Moravská Ostrava; Attendance: 550; Referees: Kulović, Škaljić (BIH)
1 February 2020; 18:00	3× (yellow card) 4× (suspension)	Report	2× (yellow card) 3× (suspension)	Sportovní hala Ostrava, Moravská Ostrava; Attendance: 550; Referees: Kulović, Škaljić (BIH)

9 February 2020; 19:30	KH-7 BM Granollers (Spain)	40–23	(Czech Republic) DHC Sokol Poruba	Palau d'Esports de Granollers, Granollers; Attendance: 1,200; Referees: Schols (NED), Martens (BEL)
9 February 2020; 19:30	Vegué 8	(16–10)	Polášková 6	Palau d'Esports de Granollers, Granollers; Attendance: 1,200; Referees: Schols (NED), Martens (BEL)
9 February 2020; 19:30	3× (yellow card) 2× (suspension)	Report	3× (yellow card) 3× (suspension)	Palau d'Esports de Granollers, Granollers; Attendance: 1,200; Referees: Schols (NED), Martens (BEL)

KH-7 BM Granollers won 72–42 on aggregate.

1 February 2020; 18:30	HIB Handball Graz (Austria)	14–30	(Serbia) HC Naisa Niš	ASVÖ Multisportive Hall, Graz; Attendance: 121; Referees: Stokes, Bartlett (GBR)
1 February 2020; 18:30	Albek 9	(7–17)	Filipović 7	ASVÖ Multisportive Hall, Graz; Attendance: 121; Referees: Stokes, Bartlett (GBR)
1 February 2020; 18:30	1× (yellow card) 3× (suspension)	Report	2× (yellow card) 4× (suspension)	ASVÖ Multisportive Hall, Graz; Attendance: 121; Referees: Stokes, Bartlett (GBR)

8 February 2020; 18:30	HC Naisa Niš (Serbia)	30–24	(Austria) HIB Handball Graz	Čair Sports Center, Niš; Attendance: 300; Referees: Fukala, Mohyla (CZE)
8 February 2020; 18:30	Terzić 8	(14–12)	Albek 9	Čair Sports Center, Niš; Attendance: 300; Referees: Fukala, Mohyla (CZE)
8 February 2020; 18:30	2× (yellow card) 4× (suspension)	Report	2× (yellow card) 2× (suspension)	Čair Sports Center, Niš; Attendance: 300; Referees: Fukala, Mohyla (CZE)

HC Naisa Niš won 60–38 on aggregate.

1 February 2020; 20:00	JuRo Unirek VZV (Netherlands)	29–24	(Italy) SSV Brixen Südtirol	Sportcentrum VZV-Sporthal t Zijveld, CG 't Veld; Attendance: 750; Referees: Cipov, Klus (SVK)
1 February 2020; 20:00	Jimmink, Staal 5	(15–14)	Tasić 6	Sportcentrum VZV-Sporthal t Zijveld, CG 't Veld; Attendance: 750; Referees: Cipov, Klus (SVK)
1 February 2020; 20:00	3× (yellow card) 6× (suspension)	Report	1× (yellow card) 4× (suspension)	Sportcentrum VZV-Sporthal t Zijveld, CG 't Veld; Attendance: 750; Referees: Cipov, Klus (SVK)

8 February 2020; 19:00	SSV Brixen Südtirol (Italy)	20–26	(Netherlands) JuRo Unirek VZV	Sporthalle Sportzone Süd, Brixen; Attendance: 1,000; Referees: Duplii, Pobedrina (UKR)
8 February 2020; 19:00	Abfalterer 4	(7-9)	Jimmink 7	Sporthalle Sportzone Süd, Brixen; Attendance: 1,000; Referees: Duplii, Pobedrina (UKR)
8 February 2020; 19:00	2× (yellow card) 3× (suspension)	Report	3× (yellow card) 7× (suspension)	Sporthalle Sportzone Süd, Brixen; Attendance: 1,000; Referees: Duplii, Pobedrina (UKR)

JuRo Unirek VZV won 55–44 on aggregate.

31 January 2020; 16:00	ŽRK Bjelovar (Croatia)	23–25	(Israel) Maccabi Rishon LeZion	Beit Maccabi Sport Centre, Rishon LeZion; Attendance: 250; Referees: Antashev, Musatov (RUS)
31 January 2020; 16:00	Mamić 7	(12–12)	Levi 6	Beit Maccabi Sport Centre, Rishon LeZion; Attendance: 250; Referees: Antashev, Musatov (RUS)
31 January 2020; 16:00	1× (yellow card) 5× (suspension)	Report	3× (yellow card) 4× (suspension)	Beit Maccabi Sport Centre, Rishon LeZion; Attendance: 250; Referees: Antashev, Musatov (RUS)

1 February 2020; 16:00	Maccabi Rishon LeZion (Israel)	21–33	(Croatia) ŽRK Bjelovar	Beit Maccabi Sport Centre, Rishon LeZion; Attendance: 200; Referees: Antashev, Musatov (RUS)
1 February 2020; 16:00	Bertaut 6	(9–19)	Mamić 13	Beit Maccabi Sport Centre, Rishon LeZion; Attendance: 200; Referees: Antashev, Musatov (RUS)
1 February 2020; 16:00	2× (yellow card) 7× (suspension)	Report	3× (yellow card) 6× (suspension)	Beit Maccabi Sport Centre, Rishon LeZion; Attendance: 200; Referees: Antashev, Musatov (RUS)

ŽRK Bjelovar won 56–46 on aggregate.

== Quarterfinals ==
For the quarter-finals, there was no seeding as all eight teams will be drawn from the same pot one after another. There was also no country protection applied in the draw. The semi-final draw followed using the quarter-final pairings.

Qualified teams

- (Spain) Aula Alimentos de Valladolid
- (Croatia) ŽRK Bjelovar
- (Croatia) RK Lokomotiva Zagreb
- (Portugal) CS Madeira
- (Spain) Mecalia Atlético Guardés
- (Serbia) HC Naisa Niš
- (Netherlands) JuRo Unirek VZV
- (Spain) KH-7 BM Granollers

The draw event was held at the EHF Office in Vienna on Tuesday 11 February 2020. The draw determined the quarter-final and also the semi-final pairings. Teams listed first will play the first leg at home.

The first legs were played on 29 February–1 March and the second legs were played on 7–8 March 2020.

Team 1	Agg.	Team 2	1st leg	2nd leg
Aula Alimentos de Valladolid (Spain)	49–45	(Spain) Mecalia Atlético Guardés	26–22	23–23
CS Madeira (Portugal)	40–60 ^{1}	(Serbia) HC Naisa Niš	19–33	21–27
JuRo Unirek VZV (Netherlands)	56–61	(Spain) KH-7 BM Granollers	26–25	30–36
RK Lokomotiva Zagreb (Croatia)	58–44	(Croatia) ŽRK Bjelovar	30–23	28–21

Notes

^{1} Both legs were hosted by CS Madeira.

=== Matches ===
1 March 2020; 12:00	Aula Alimentos de Valladolid (Spain)	26–22	(Spain) Mecalia Atlético Guardés	Polideportivo Huerta del Rey, Valladolid; Attendance: 1,600; Referees: Kull, Tint (EST)
1 March 2020; 12:00	three players 4	(11–10)	Buforn 6	Polideportivo Huerta del Rey, Valladolid; Attendance: 1,600; Referees: Kull, Tint (EST)
1 March 2020; 12:00	1× (yellow card) 3× (suspension) 1× (red card)	Report	2× (yellow card) 2× (suspension)	Polideportivo Huerta del Rey, Valladolid; Attendance: 1,600; Referees: Kull, Tint (EST)

8 March 2020; 19:00	Mecalia Atlético Guardés (Spain)	23–23	(Spain) Aula Alimentos de Valladolid	A Sangriña, Pontevedra; Attendance: 550; Referees: Capoccia, Jucker (SUI)
8 March 2020; 19:00	Campos 7	(10–8)	Álvarez 8	A Sangriña, Pontevedra; Attendance: 550; Referees: Capoccia, Jucker (SUI)
8 March 2020; 19:00	4× (yellow card) 3× (suspension)	Report	2× (yellow card) 5× (suspension)	A Sangriña, Pontevedra; Attendance: 550; Referees: Capoccia, Jucker (SUI)

Aula Alimentos de Valladolid won 49–45 on aggregate.

7 March 2020; 18:00	CS Madeira (Portugal)	19–33	(Serbia) HC Naisa Niš	Pavilhao Bartolomeu Perestrelo, Funchal; Attendance: 500; Referees: Hannes, Hannes (GER)
7 March 2020; 18:00	Freitas 6	(7–14)	Milojević 8	Pavilhao Bartolomeu Perestrelo, Funchal; Attendance: 500; Referees: Hannes, Hannes (GER)
7 March 2020; 18:00	2× (yellow card) 4× (suspension)	Report	2× (yellow card) 6× (suspension)	Pavilhao Bartolomeu Perestrelo, Funchal; Attendance: 500; Referees: Hannes, Hannes (GER)

8 March 2020; 18:00	HC Naisa Niš (Serbia)	27–21	(Portugal) CS Madeira	Pavilhao Bartolomeu Perestrelo, Funchal; Attendance: 400; Referees: Hannes, Hannes (GER)
8 March 2020; 18:00	Terzić 6	(14–13)	Leça 6	Pavilhao Bartolomeu Perestrelo, Funchal; Attendance: 400; Referees: Hannes, Hannes (GER)
8 March 2020; 18:00	3× (yellow card) 4× (suspension)	Report	2× (yellow card) 5× (suspension)	Pavilhao Bartolomeu Perestrelo, Funchal; Attendance: 400; Referees: Hannes, Hannes (GER)

HC Naisa Niš won 60–40 on aggregate.

29 February 2020; 20:00	JuRo Unirek VZV (Netherlands)	26–25	(Spain) KH-7 BM Granollers	Sportcentrum VZV-Sporthal t Zijveld, CG 't Veld; Attendance: 750; Referees: Jaškins, Žabko (LAT)
29 February 2020; 20:00	Kolken 8	(12–16)	Vegué 7	Sportcentrum VZV-Sporthal t Zijveld, CG 't Veld; Attendance: 750; Referees: Jaškins, Žabko (LAT)
29 February 2020; 20:00	2× (yellow card) 2× (suspension)	Report	1× (yellow card) 2× (suspension)	Sportcentrum VZV-Sporthal t Zijveld, CG 't Veld; Attendance: 750; Referees: Jaškins, Žabko (LAT)

8 March 2020; 12:30	KH-7 BM Granollers (Spain)	36–30	(Netherlands) JuRo Unirek VZV	Palau d'Esports de Granollers, Granollers; Attendance: 2,500; Referees: Nygaard, Pedersen (DEN)
8 March 2020; 12:30	Vegué 9	(18–14)	Trabelsi 7	Palau d'Esports de Granollers, Granollers; Attendance: 2,500; Referees: Nygaard, Pedersen (DEN)
8 March 2020; 12:30	1× (yellow card)	Report	1× (yellow card) 1× (suspension)	Palau d'Esports de Granollers, Granollers; Attendance: 2,500; Referees: Nygaard, Pedersen (DEN)

KH-7 BM Granollers won 61–56 on aggregate.

29 February 2020; 18:30	RK Lokomotiva Zagreb (Croatia)	30–23	(Croatia) ŽRK Bjelovar	Športska dvorana Trešnjevka, Zagreb; Attendance: 1,000; Referees: Hofer, Schmidhuber (AUT)
29 February 2020; 18:30	Prkačin 8	(17–12)	Borković 6	Športska dvorana Trešnjevka, Zagreb; Attendance: 1,000; Referees: Hofer, Schmidhuber (AUT)
29 February 2020; 18:30	1× (yellow card) 2× (suspension)	Report	2× (yellow card) 1× (suspension)	Športska dvorana Trešnjevka, Zagreb; Attendance: 1,000; Referees: Hofer, Schmidhuber (AUT)

7 March 2020; 19:00	ŽRK Bjelovar (Croatia)	21–28	(Croatia) RK Lokomotiva Zagreb	Dvorana Europskih Prvaka, Bjelovar; Attendance: 1,000; Referees: Butskevich, Butskevich (BLR)
7 March 2020; 19:00	Borković 7	(9–15)	Posavec 7	Dvorana Europskih Prvaka, Bjelovar; Attendance: 1,000; Referees: Butskevich, Butskevich (BLR)
7 March 2020; 19:00	3× (yellow card) 6× (suspension) 1× (red card)	Report	1× (yellow card) 4× (suspension)	Dvorana Europskih Prvaka, Bjelovar; Attendance: 1,000; Referees: Butskevich, Butskevich (BLR)

RK Lokomotiva Zagreb won 58–44 on aggregate.

== Final four ==
The first legs were scheduled to 4–5 April and the second legs were scheduled to 11–12 April 2020, but the European Handball Federation announced on 13 March 2020, that the Semi-final matches will not be held as scheduled due to the ongoing developments in the spread of COVID-19 across Europe. On 25 March, the EHF announced that no matches will be played before June due to the coronavirus pandemic and Women's Challenge Cup is foreseen to be played in an EHF FINAL4 format in one venue over two playing days. On 24 April 2020 the matches were cancelled.

=== Bracket ===
Semifinals

Final
Third place

=== Semifinals ===
RK Lokomotiva Zagreb (Croatia)	Cancelled	(Serbia) HC Naisa Niš

Aula Alimentos de Valladolid (Spain)	Cancelled	(Spain) KH-7 BM Granollers

=== Third place game ===
LSF1	Cancelled	LSF2

=== Final ===
WSF1	Cancelled	WSF2

== Top goalscorers ==
As of 8 March 2020

Rank	Player	Club	Goals
1	(Spain) Ona Vegué	(Spain) KH-7 BM Granollers	30
2	(Croatia) Stela Posavec	(Croatia) RK Lokomotiva Zagreb	28
3	(Spain) Carmen Campos	(Spain) Mecalia Atlético Guardés	24

== See also ==
- 2019–20 Women's EHF Champions League
- 2019–20 Women's EHF Cup
