= Elaine Gomes =

Brazilian handball player (born 1992)

Personal information
- Full name: Elaine Gomes Barbosa
- Born: 1 June 1992 (age 34) Fortaleza, Brazil
- Height: 1.83 m (6 ft 0 in)

Sport
- Sport: Handball
- Position: Line player
- Current club: Ortahisar Bld.
- Number: 19

Senior clubs
- Years: Team
- 2010-2012: ABLUHAND
- 2013–2014: Força Atlética Handebol
- 2014–2016: Nykøbing F. Håndboldklub
- 2016–2017: HCM Râmnicu Vâlcea
- 2017–2018: Kastamonu Belediyesi Gsk
- 2018–2019: Nantes
- 2019: Corona Brașov
- 2020–2021: BM Granollers
- 2021–2022: CS Minaur Baia Mare
- 2022–2023: A.C. PAOK
- 2023–2023: OF Nea Ionia
- 2024–2024: Armada Praxis Yalıkavakspor
- 2024–2025: Ortahisar Belediyespor
National team
Years	Team	Apps	(Gls)
2010–	Brazil	59	(44)
Medal record
World Championship
Gold medal – first place	2013 Serbia	Team
Pan American Games
Gold medal – first place	2015 Toronto	Team
Gold medal – first place	2019 Lima	Team
South and Central American Championship
Gold medal – first place	2018 Brazil
- Updated on 10 November 2023

Elaine Gomes Barbosa (born 1 June 1992) is a Brazilian female handball player who plays for Romanian club Ortahisar Bld. and the Brazil national team. In 2013 she won the World Championship; the first time ever for Brazil and South America.

== Career ==
Gomes played for Brazilian clubs until 2014, with the last being Força Atlética Handebol. She then moved to Europe to become professional, and joined Danish Nykøbing Falster Håndboldklub on a 2 year deal. Already a year after, she was released of her contract. She then joined HCM Râmnicu Vâlcea, but also here she had her contract cancelled early.

She then joined Kastamonu Belediyesi Gsk in Turkey. After a year she joined French team Neptunes de Nantes. Here she played for a single season, before returning to Romania, where she joined Corona Brașov. Here she had her contract cancelled for a third time, after being involved in a doping scandal.

She then joined Spanish BM Granollers for the 2020-21 season. She then joined CS Minaur Baia Mare on a three year contract. After a year joined the Greek team A.C. PAOK. A year later she joined OF Nea Ionia. In 2024 she joined Armada Praxis Yalıkavakspor, followed by Ortahisar Bld. SK in Turkey.

== National team ==
Elaine Gomes was included in the Brazil team for the 2013 World Women's Handball Championship, despite only having played 5 national team matches at that point. Here she won the title with Brazil, which was the first for both Brazil and Latin America.

She has since then not represented Brazil at a World Championship, but was part of the team that won gold medals at the Pan American Games in 2015 and 2019 and at the South American Championship in 2018.

== International honours ==
- World Championship:
  - Winner: 2013
- Pan American Games:
  - Winner: 2015, 2019
- South American Championship:
  - Winner: 2018
