= Elena Gjeorgjievska =

Macedonian handball player

Personal information
- Nationality: Macedonian
- Born: 27 March 1990 (age 36) Struga, SR Macedonia
- Height: 1.79 m (5 ft 10 in)

Sport
- Sport: Handball
- Position: Right back
- Current club: Konyaaltı Bld. SK

Senior clubs
- Years: Team
- 2005-2007: Eurostandard GJ.P
- 2007-2009: Kometal Gjorče Petrov
- 2009-2012: WHC Vardar Skopje
- 2012-2014: ŽRK Budućnost
- 2014-2016: HCM Baia Mare
- 2016–2018: Fehérvár KC
- 2018–2019: SCM Craiova
- 2019–2020: Podravka Koprivnica
- 2020–2023: Măgura Cisnădie
- 2023-: Konyaaltı Bld. SK
National team
- Years: Team
- –: Macedonia

Elena Gjeorgjievska (Macedonian: Елена Ѓорѓиевска; born 27 March 1990 in Struga) is a Macedonian female handballer who plays as a right back for Konyaaltı Bld. SK and the North Macedonia national team.

== International honours ==
- EHF Champions League:
  - Winner: 2012
  - Finalist: 2014
- EHF Challenge Cup:
  - Semifinalist: 2010

== Individual awards ==
- Carpathian Trophy Top Scorer: 2017
