= Samara Vieira =

Brazilian handball player (born 1991)

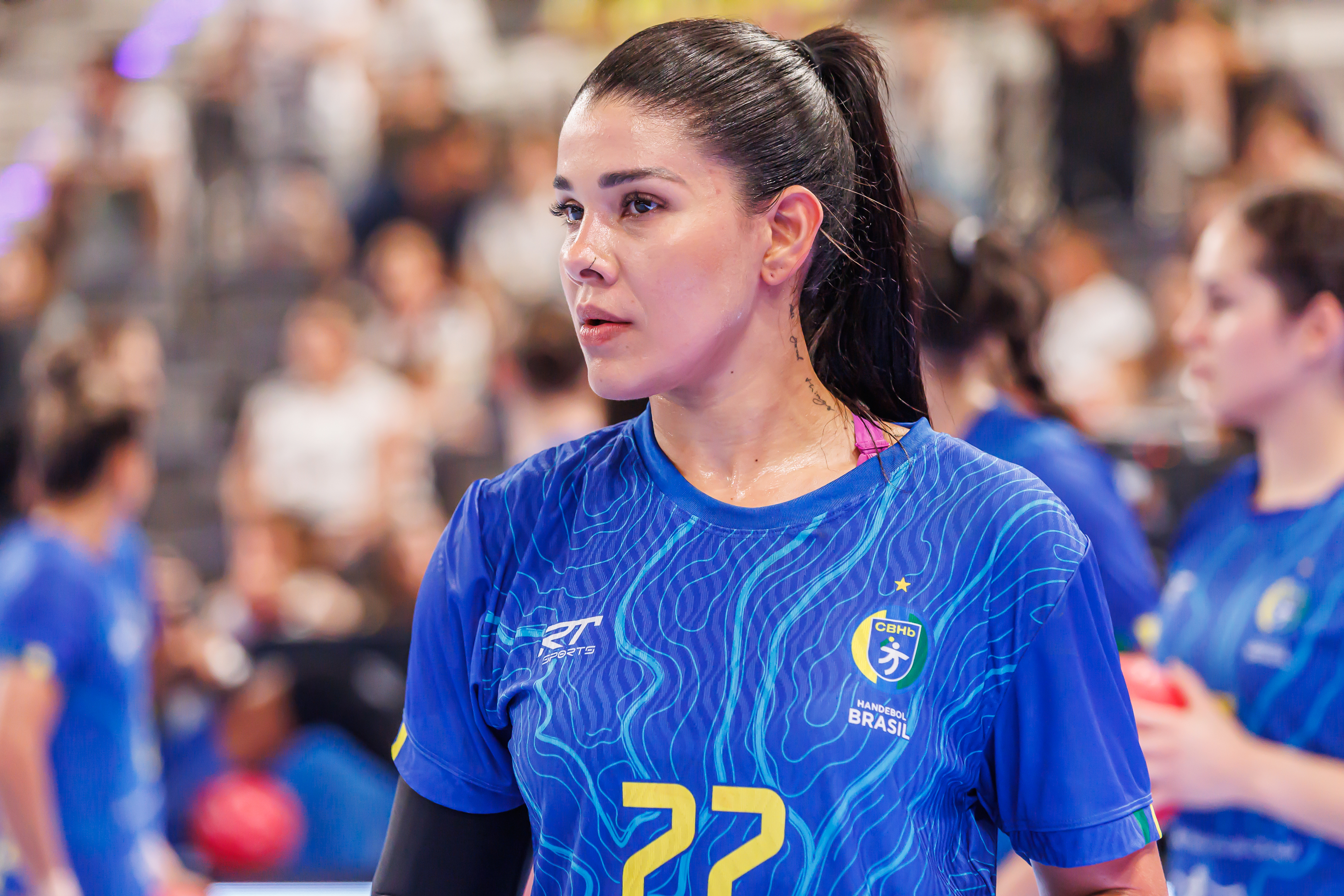

Personal information
- Full name: Samara da Silva Vieira
- Born: 7 October 1991 (age 35) Natal, Brazil
- Height: 1.83 m (6 ft 0 in)

Sport
- Sport: Handball
- Position: Left back
- Current club: Konyaaltı Bld. SK
- Number: 2

Senior clubs
- Years: Team
- –2016: FAB/Vasco da Gama
- 2016–2017: HSG Blomberg-Lippe
- 2017–2018: Üsküdar Bld. SK
- 2018: Apahand/UCS/Fátima Saúde-RS
- 2018–2020: SCM Râmnicu Vâlcea
- 2020–2021: RK Krim
- 2021–2022: HC Dunărea Brăila
- 2022–2023: Kastamonu
- 2023–: Konyaaltı Bld. SK
National team
Years	Team	Apps	(Gls)
2015–	Brazil	22	(52)
Medal record
Pan American Games
Gold medal – first place	2019 Lima	Team
South and Central American Championship
Gold medal – first place	2024 Brazil

Samara da Silva Vieira (born 7 October 1991) is a Brazilian female handballer for Konyaaltı Bld. SK and the Brazilian national team.

== Achievements ==
- Romanian National League:
  - Winner: 2019
- Romanian Cup:
  - Winner: 2022
- Romanian Supercup:
  - Finalist: 2021
- Brazilian National League:
  - Bronze Medalist: 2016
- Brazilian Cup:
  - Silver Medalist: 2016
  - Bronze Medalist: 2015

== Individual awards ==
- MVP of the Youth World Championship: 2008
- All-Star Centre Back of the Brazilian Cup: 2015
- Gala Premiilor Handbalului Românesc Liga Națională Defensive Player of the Season: 2019
