= Lana Jurina =

Croatian handballer (born 2000)

Personal information
- Nationality: Croatian
- Born: 22 June 2005 (age 21) Zagreb, Croatia
- Height: 1.77 m (5 ft 10 in)

Sport
- Sport: Handball
- Position: Centre back
- Current club: RK Lokomotiva Zagreb
- Number: 36

Senior clubs
- Years: Team
- –2024: RK Sesvete Agroproteinka
- 2024–2026: ŽRK Koka Varaždin
- 2026–: RK Lokomotiva Zagreb
National team
Years	Team	Apps	(Gls)
2025–	Croatia	4	(3)
- Updated on 29 October 2026

Lana Jurina (born 22 June 2005) is a Croatian handballer for RK Lokomotiva Zagreb and the Croatian national team.

She represented Croatia at the 2025 World Women's Handball Championship.
