= Yalıkavak SK =

Turkish handball club

- Full name: Yalıkavak Spor Kulübü
- Nickname: "Denizin Kızları" (literally: "Girls of the Sea")
- Short name: Yalıkavak SK
- Founded: 19 October 1987; 38 years ago
- Arena: Binnaz Karakaya Sports Hall
- President: Mehmet Esen
- Head coach: (Turkey) Özcan Kıvanç
- League: Turkish Women's Handball Super League
- Club colours

Location of Yalıkavak SK

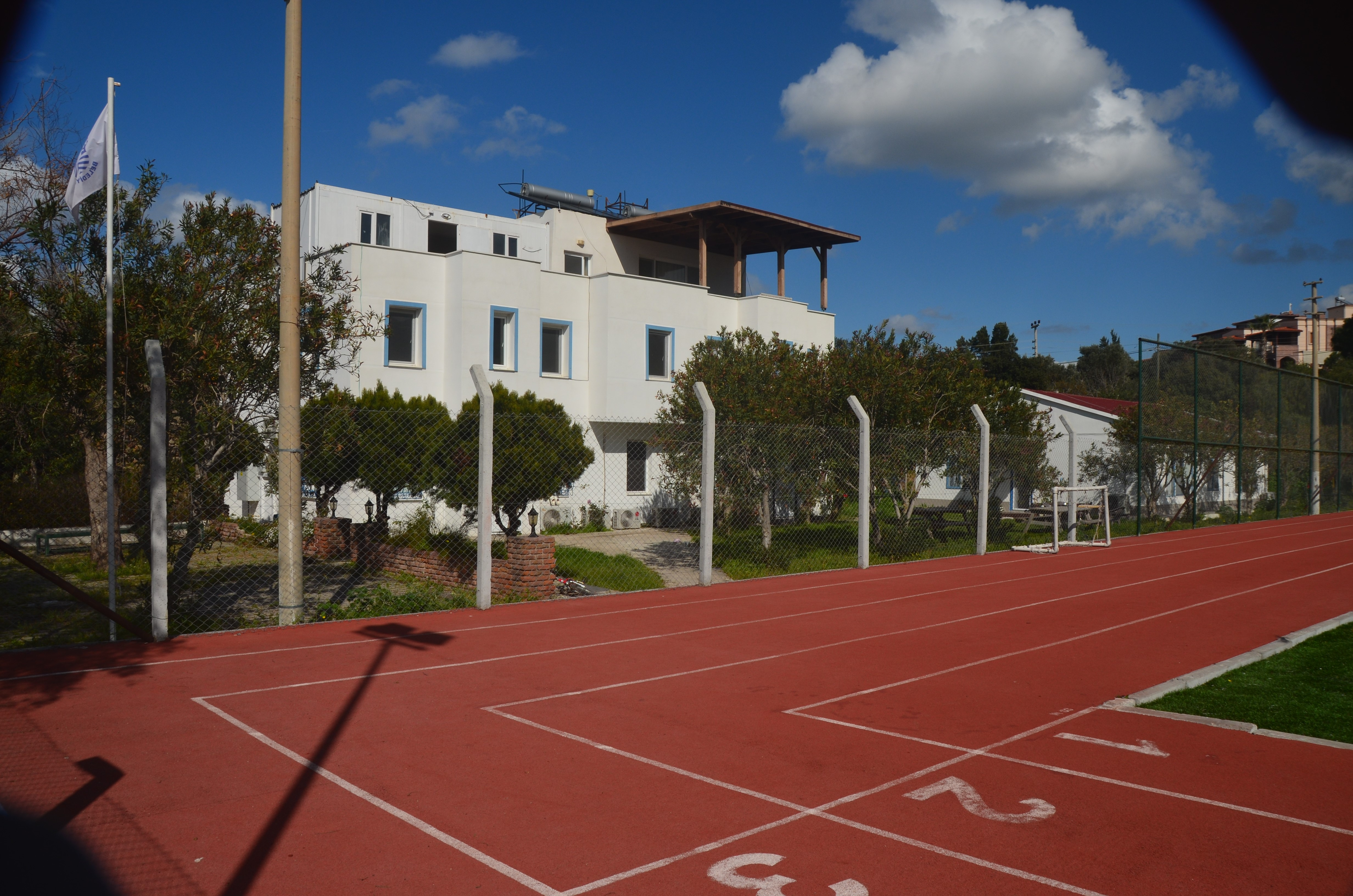
Club office at the Türkan Saylan Sports Complex in Geriş, Bodrum.

Yalıkavak Sports Club (Turkish: Yalıkavak Spor Kulübü), Armada Praxis Yalıkavak Spor for sponsorship reasons, is a women's handball club based in Yalıkavak, Bodrum of Muğla Province, Turkey. The team competes in the Turkish Super League.

== History ==
The club was founded under the name Yalıkavak Belediyesi Spor Kulübü by the local municipality at Yalıkavak neighborhood of Bodrum district in Muğla Province, southwestern Turkey on 19 October 1987. After the town municipality was abolished in 2014, the club continued its activities as Yalıkavak SK. The club has around 100 sportspeople in the football and handball sides. The women's handball team, nicknamed "Denizin kızları" ("The Mermaids"), was formed in 2008.

Starting to compete in the Turkish Women's Handball First League in the 2016–17 season, the team reached the quarterfinals of the Women's Handball Turkish Cup. The youth team consisting of girls aged 10–12 became the Turkish champion twice. The club became runners-up in the youth and juniors championships twice. Eight club members were called up to the national team, and one of the club member started to play in the national beach handball team.

The club is headquartered at the Türkan Saylan Sports Complex in Geriş, Bodrum. The club president is Mehmet Esen, and the team's head coach Özcan Kıvanç. The team is sponsored by Armada Praxis.

Yalıkavak became champion in the 2023–24 Turkish Women's Handball Super Lesgue after winning over Yenimahalle Bld. SK in the play-offs by 3–1. They won the Turkish Women's Handball Super Cup in 2024 defeating Yenimahalle Bld. SK by 37–24.

The team is nicknamed "Denizin Kızları" (literally: "Girls of the Sea").

== Colors ==
The club colors are blue and white.

== Arena ==
The team play their home matches at Binnaz Karakaya Sports Hall located in Gümbet, Bodrum.

== Competitions ==
=== Domestic ===
==== 2020–21 and 2021–22 seasons ====
Yalıkavak finished the 2020–21 and 2021–22 seasons of the Turkish Women's Handball Super League seasons as runners-up.

==== 2022–23 season ====
Yalıkavak won the Women's Handball Turkish Cup in 2023 defeating Kastamonu Bld. GSK in the final. They won the 2023 Women's Handball Turkish Super Cup defeating the league-champion Kastamonu Bld. GSK in the final.

==== 2023–24 season ====
Yalıkavak became champion in the 2023–24 Turkish Women's Handball Super League after winning over Yenimahalle SK in the play-offs by 3–1.

==== 2024–25 season ====
Yalıkavak won the 2024 Turkish Women's Handball Super Cup defeating Yenimahalle Bld. SK by 37–24. They became again champion in the 2024–25 Turkish Women's Handball Super League after winning over Adasokağı SK in the play-offs by 3–1 (26–25, 29–33, 29–23, 28–18).

=== 2025–26 season ===
The team lost the final match of the 2025 Turkish Super Cup to Bursa Büyükşehir Bld. by 30–26, and became the runners-up.

=== EHF European League ===
Season	Round	Club	1st leg	2nd leg	Aggregate
2021–22	Round 1	(Hungary) MTK Budapest	24–33	30–39	54–72
2022–23	Round 1	(Denmark) Nykøbing Falster HK	21–29	24–37	45–66
2024–25	Round 2	(Poland) KPR Gminy Kobierzyce	27–36	26–27	53–63

=== EHF European Cup ===
Season A	Round	Club	1st leg	2nd leg	Aggregate
2020–21	Round 1	(Turkey) İzmir BB GSK	30–26	31–22	61–48
2020–21	Last 16	(Turkey) Muratpaşa Bld. SK	39–20	28–26	67–46
2020–21	Quarterfinals	(Spain) Rocasa Gran Canaria	28–25		
2020–21	Semifinals	(Croatia) RK Lokomotiva Zagreb	0–10		
2023–24	Round 1	(Portugal) ADA Sao Pedro do Sul	23–27	30–25	53–52
2023–24	Round 2	(Italy) SSV Brixen Südtirol	36–27	28–19	64–46
2023–24	Last 16	(Turkey) Yenimahalle Bld. SK	27–23	36–23	63–46
2023–24	Quarterfinals	(Portugal) SL Benfica	29–33	23–30	52–63

== Current squad ==
Team members at the 2025–26 Turkish Women's Handball Super League season.

- 1 (Romania) Anca Mihaela Rombescu (GK)
- 2 (Turkey) Beyza Gedik (RB)
- 4 (Turkey) Reyhan Kaya (CB)
- 5 (Turkey) Buket Seven (CB)
- 7 (Turkey) Edanur Burhan (RB)
- 10 (Turkey) Gülcan Tügel (CB)
- 11 (Ukraine) Sofiia Bezrukova (LB)
- 14 (Turkey) Nurceren Akgün Gökttepe (LP)
- 15 (Turkey) Betül Karaarslan (CB)
- 17 (Turkey) Ceylan Aydemir (LW)
- 18 (Turkey) Tuana Akman (LW)
- 22 (Turkey) Yağmur Bembeyaz (GK)
- 25 (Turkey) Hatice Özdemir (LP)
- 29 (Slovenia) Živa Čopi (RW)
- 48 (Turkey) Merve Kaya (GK)
- 61 (Turkey) İlke Yıldız (LW)
- (Turkey) Gözde Seven (CB)
- GK: Goalkeeper
- LW: Left winger
- RW: Right winger
- LP: Line player
- CB: Center back
- LB: Left back
- RB: Right back

== Former notable players ==
- (Bosnia and Herzegovina) Armina Isić
- (Brazil) Jaqueline Anastácio
- (Brazil) Elaine Gomes
- (Czech Republic) Sára Kovářová
- (Netherlands) Isabelle Jongenelen
- (Romania) Anca Mihaela Rombescu
- (Russia) Valeria Baranik
- (Tunisia) Mouna Chebbah
- (Turkey) Ümmügülsüm Bedel
- (Turkey) Ceyhan Coşkunsu
- (Turkey) Sevilay İmamoğlu Öcal
- (Turkey) Sude Karademir
- (Turkey) Yeliz Özel
- (Turkey) Fatma Gül Sakızcan
- (Turkey) Nurşah Sancak
- (Turkey) Kübra Sarıkaya
- (Turkey) Yasemin Şahin
- (Turkey) Perihan Topaloğlu
- (Turkey) Kübra Yılmaz

== Kit history ==
2024–25 home	2024–25 away

== Honours ==
Turkish Women's Handball Super League
Champions (2): 2023–24, 2024–25
Runners-up (2): 2020–21, 2021–22

Turkish Women's Handball Super Cup
Winners (2) 2023, 2024
Runners-uo (1): 2025.
