= Lea Zetović =

Croatian handballer (born 2004)

Personal information
- Nationality: Croatian
- Born: 10 October 2004 (age 22) Đakovo, Croatia
- Height: 1.81 m (5 ft 11 in)

Sport
- Sport: Handball
- Position: Goalkeeper
- Current club: RK Lokomotiva Zagreb
- Number: 25

Senior clubs
- Years: Team
- –2019: ŽRK Đakovo
- 2019–2023: RK Sesvete Agroproteinka
- 2023–2024: S.L. Benfica
- 2024–: RK Lokomotiva Zagreb
National team
Years	Team	Apps	(Gls)
2025–	Croatia	12	(0)
- Updated on 29 October 2026

Lea Zetović (born 10 October 2004) is a Croatian handballer for RK Lokomotiva Zagreb and the Croatian national team.

She represented Croatia at the 2025 World Women's Handball Championship.
