= RK Lokomotiva Zagreb =

- Full name: Lokomotiva Zagreb
- Short name: Rukometni klub Lokomotiva Zagreb (Lokomotiva Zagreb Handball Club)
- Founded: 1949
- Arena: Dom Sportova
- Capacity: 3,000
- Head coach: Silvio Ivandija
- League: Croatian League; WHRL
- 2024–25: 2nd
- Club colours
Home	Away

Rukometni Klub Lokomotiva Zagreb (English: Lokomotiva Zagreb Handball Club) is a Croatian professional women's handball club from Zagreb.

Lokomotiva was the most successful team in the Yugoslav Championship's early stages, winning eight championships between 1956 and 1970. In 1975, the team reached the final of the European Cup after winning its ninth championship. However, the following fifteen years were unsuccessful, with Radnički Belgrade dominating the championship. The team resurfaced in 1991, winning both the final edition of the Yugoslav Championship and the EHF Cup, its first international trophy, beating Bayer Leverkusen in the final.

Following the breakup of Yugoslavia, Lokomotiva, renamed Kraš Zagreb, won the first edition of the new Croatian League, but the team soon fell second to Podravka Koprivnica. The team's major successes in the 1990s were reaching the Cup Winner's Cup's final in 1996 and 1998. The club reversed to its original name in 2003, and the following seasons marked a timid revival, with Lokomotiva winning the three championship titles and four national cups.

Most recently, Lokomotiva was second in the national championship and won the EHF Challenge Cup in 2017.

Lokomotiva gave eight players of the national team which are surprisingly won the bronze medal at the 2020 European Women's Handball Championship (Lucija Bešen, Dora Kalaus, Larissa Kalaus, Paula Posavec, Stela Posavec, Tena Japundža, Kristina Prkačin and Andrea Šimara). Also the Lokomotiva's coach Nenad Šoštarić was the head coach of the that generation.

== Honours ==
- EHF Cup
  - 1991
- EHF Challenge Cup
  - 2017
- Croatian League
  - 1992, 2004, 2014, 2022, 2023
- Croatian Cup
  - 1992, 2005, 2007, 2014, 2018, 2021
- Yugoslav Championship (defunct)
  - 1956, 1959, 1962, 1964, 1965, 1968, 1969, 1970, 1974, 1991
- Yugoslav Cup (defunct)
  - 1956, 1957, 1958, 1959, 1960, 1965, 1971, 1988

== European record ==
Season	Competition	Round	Club	1st leg	2nd leg	Aggregate
2016–17	Challenge Cup	R3	(Portugal) CS Madeira	29–24	40–21	69–45
2016–17	Challenge Cup	1/8	(Turkey) Ardeşen GSK	33–25	24–20	57–45
2016–17	Challenge Cup	1/4	(Spain) Rocasa Gran Canaria ACE	29–24	23–26	52–50
2016–17	Challenge Cup	1/2	(Netherlands) Virto/Quintus	24–23	27–16	51–39
2016–17	Challenge Cup	F	(Sweden) H 65 Höör	23–19	24–21	47–40
2017–18	Challenge Cup	R3	(Austria) UHC Müllner Bau Stockerau	24–19	37–19	61–38
2017–18	Challenge Cup	1/8	(Greece) AC PAOK	37–17	33–20	70–37
2017–18	Challenge Cup	1/4	(Netherlands) Virto/Quintus	26–17	27–24	53–41
2017–18	Challenge Cup	1/2	(Spain) Rocasa Gran Canaria ACE	26–26	25–25	51–51
2018–19	EHF Cup	R1	(Sweden) H 65 Höör	18–22	19–23	37–45
2019–20	Challenge Cup	1/8	(Portugal) SIR 1º de Maio/ADA CJ Barros	33–21	27–16	60–37
2019–20	Challenge Cup	1/4	(Croatia) ŽRK Bjelovar	30–23	28–21	58–44
2019–20	Challenge Cup	1/2	(Serbia) HC Naisa Niš	Cancelled		
2020–21	European Cup	R3	(Italy) Alì-Best Espresso Mestrino	30–14	35–18	65–32
2020–21	European Cup	1/8	(Italy) Jomi Salerno	33–22	34–18	67–40
2020–21	European Cup	1/4	(Czech Republic) DHC Slavia Prague	30–25	31–27	61–52
2020–21	European Cup	1/2	(Turkey) Yalikavaksports Club	10–0	10–0	20–0
2020–21	European Cup	F	(Spain) CBF Málaga Costa del Sol	28–32	31–28	59–60
2021–22	European League	R3	(Poland) MKS Perla Lublin	25–21	29–27	54–48
2021–22	European League	Group stage (Group A)	(Hungary) Mosonmagyaróvári KC SE	19–22	24–28	4th place
2021–22	European League	Group stage (Group A)	(France) ESBF Besançon	27–28	26–31	4th place
2021–22	European League	Group stage (Group A)	(Norway) Sola HK	18–25	25–40	4th place
2022–23	EHF Champions League	Group stage Group B	(Hungary) Győri Audi ETO KC			
2022–23	EHF Champions League	Group stage Group B	(France) Metz Handball			
2022–23	EHF Champions League	Group stage Group B	(Romania) CS Rapid București			
2022–23	EHF Champions League	Group stage Group B	(Montenegro) ŽRK Budućnost Podgorica			
2022–23	EHF Champions League	Group stage Group B	(Norway) Storhamar HE			
2022–23	EHF Champions League	Group stage Group B	(Turkey) Kastamonu Bld. GSK			
2022–23	EHF Champions League	Group stage Group B	(Denmark) Team Esbjerg			

== Team ==
=== Current squad ===
Squad for the 2026–27 season

Goalkeepers

- 16 (Croatia) Lea Zetović
- 81 (Croatia) Nika Kraljević
- 91 (Croatia) Tea Pijević

Wingers
LW

- 33 (Croatia) Paula Posavec
- 52 (Croatia) Maja Košćec
- 90 (Montenegro) Maša Kuzmanović

RW

- 5 (Croatia) Lana Strugar
- 20 (Croatia) Lana Jurina

Line players

- 6 (Croatia) Ana Đolonga
- 7 (Croatia) Ema Balaško
- 13 (Slovenia) Manca Jurič
- 84 (Croatia) Tea Ciglar

Back players
LB

- 11 (Croatia) Iva Bule
- 17 (Croatia) Jana Miklić
- 77 (Croatia) Tara Đelekovčan
- 88 (Croatia) Kristina Prkačin
- 95 (Croatia) Eda Nikolić
- 99 (Croatia) Terezija Ćurić

CB

- 8 (Croatia) Stela Posavec
- 44 (Croatia) Iva Zrilić

RB

- 9 (Croatia) Nina Vurnek
- 55 (Croatia) Antea Čičak

==== Transfers ====
Transfers for the 2027–28 season

Joining

Leaving
