= Isabelle Jongenelen =

Dutch handball player (born 1991)

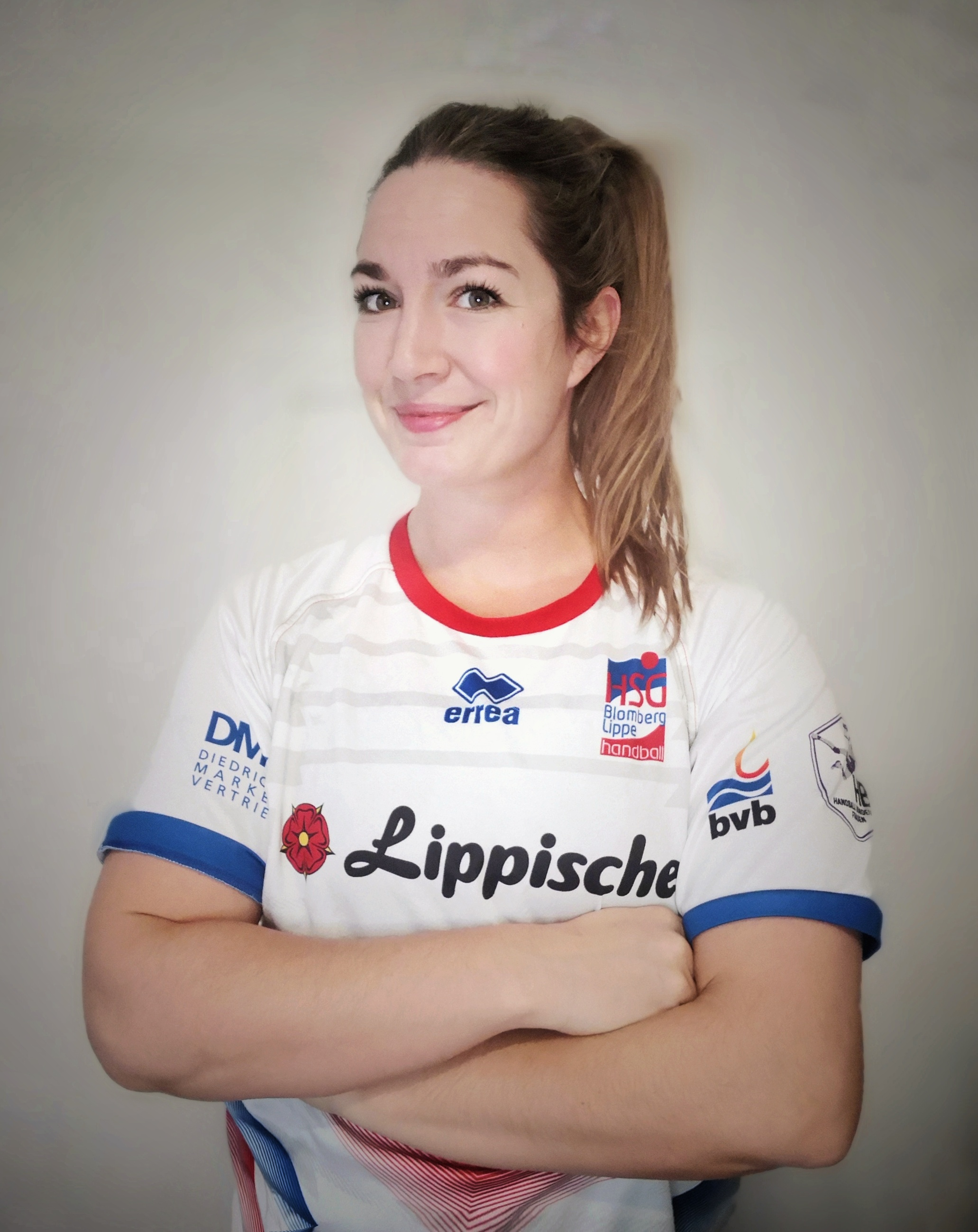
- Jongenelen in 2020

Personal information
- Born: 28 July 1991 (age 35) Breda, Netherlands
- Height: 1.79 m (5 ft 10 in)

Sport
- Sport: Handball
- Position: Right Back

Senior clubs
- Years: Team
- 2008-2011: Quintus
- 2011-2012: MizuWaAi Dalfsen
- 2012-2013: Union Mios Biganos-Bègles Handball
- 2013-2014: HSG Blomberg-Lippe
- 2014-2015: SG BBM Bietigheim
- 2016-2016: Nantes Handball
- 2016-2019: VfL Oldenburg
- 2019-2021: HSG Blomberg-Lippe
- 2021-2022: VfL Oldenburg
- 2022-2023: Yalıkavak SK
National team
- Years: Team
- 2013-?: Netherlands

Isabelle Jongenelen (born 28 July 1991) is a Dutch former handball player. She was with French, German and Turkish clubs.

== Personal life ==
Isabelle Jongenelen was born in Breda, Netherlands on 28 July 1991.

== Club career ==
Jongenelen started her handball career at HV Groene Ster in Zevenbergen, and played for Quintus and MizuWaAi Dalfsen between 2008 and 2012, before making her international debut for the French club Union Mios Biganos-Bègles Handball in 2012. After only a year in France, she moved to Germany, and joined HSG Blomberg-Lippe. During the winter break of the 2015–16 season, Jongenelen joined French club Nantes Loire Atlantique Handball, which she left again at the end of the season. After that, she was active again in the German Bundesliga with VfL Oldenburg. In September 2017, she tore her cruciate ligament. Her recovery tokk months long. In 2018, she won the German Women's Handball Federation Cup with VfL Oldenburg. In the summer of 2019, she returned to HSG Blomberg-Lippe. After two years in Blomberg, she returned to her former club VfL Oldenburg in July 2021.

In a Facebook post, the 31-year old Dutch sportswoman announced that she will quit her eleven-year long professional career, and retire from active playing handball after the end of the 2021–22 season.

In June 2022, the right winger left VfL Oldenburg, and moved to Turkey, to sign a deal with the Turkish Women's Handball Super League's runner-up team, Yalıkavak SK in Bodrum, southwestern Turkey. She played in the 2022–23 Super League season. She was named MVP in a semi-finals match of the 2023 Turkish Women's Handball Cup. Her team defeated Kastamonu Bld. GSK in the final, and won the 2023 Turkish Cup for the first time.

== Honours ==
- 2018 German Women's Handball Federation Cup winner (VfL Oldenburg)
- 2023 Turkish Women's Handball Cup winner (Yalıkavak SK)
