= Živa Čopi =

Slovenian handball player (born 1998)

Personal information
- Nationality: Slovenian
- Born: 5 August 1998 (age 28) Ljubljana, Slovenia
- Height: 1.63 m (5 ft 4 in)

Sport
- Sport: Handball
- Position: Right wing
- Current club: Yalıkavak
- Number: 29

Senior clubs
- Years: Team
- –2015: Krka Novo Mesto
- 2015–2017: Dolenjke
- 2017–2022: Krka Novo Mesto
- 2022–2025: Mlinotest Ajdovščina
- 2025–: Yalıkavak
National team
Years	Team	Apps	(Gls)
2020–	Slovenia	38	(41)
- Updated on 11 November 2026

Živa Čopi (born 5 August 1998) is a Slovenian handball right winger who plays for Yalıkavak in the Turkish Women's Super League and the Slovenian national team.

== Club career ==
Čopi is 1.63 m (5 ft 4 in) tall and plays in the right wing position.

=== Early years ===
Čopi started her handball career at ŽRK Krka Novo Mesto. In the 2015–16 season, she joined ŽRK Dolenjke.

=== ŽRK Krka Novo Mesto ===
From 2017 on, she was with her former club Krka Novo Mesto, She scored more than 400 goals in her career. She is considered as a very fast right winger.

=== ŽRK Mlinotest Ajdovščina ===
In 2022, Čopi transferred to Mlinotest Ajdovščina and signed a contract for one plus one year. She played three seasons in total between 2022 and 2025 in the Slovenian First League, and Slovenian Handball Cup. She took part in the 2022–23, 2023–24 and 2024–25 EHF European Cup.

=== Yalıkavak SK ===
In July 2025, she moved to Turkey, and signed a deal with the Super League club Yalıkavak.

== International career ==
Čopi was selected to represent Slovenia at the 2017 World Women's Handball Championship, but did not appear in the tournament. However, Čopi participated at the 2020 European Women's Handball Championship.

== Honours ==
Turkish Women's Handball Super Cup

Yalıkavak SK
Finalists (1): 2025.
