= Anca Mihaela Rombescu =

Romanian handball player (born 1985)

Personal information
- Nationality: Romanian
- Born: 15 September 1985 (age 41) Drobeta-Turnu Severin, Romania
- Height: 1.72 m (5 ft 8 in)

Sport
- Sport: Handball
- Position: Goalkeeper
- Current club: Yalıkavak SK
- Number: 1

Senior clubs
- Years: Team
- 2005–2008: CS Tomis Constanţa
- 2008–2012: Üsküdar Bld. SK
- 2012–2013: Maltepe BSK
- 2013–2017: Yenimahalle Bld. SK
- 2017–2020: Kastamonu Bld. GSK
- 2020–2023: İzmir Büyükşehir Bld. GSK
- 2023–: Yalıkavak SK
National team
- Years: Team
- –: Romania

Anca Mihaela Rombescu (born 15 September 1985) is a Romanian handball player. She plays as the goalkeeper for Yalıkavak SK in the Turkish Super League and the Romania national team.

== Club career ==
She played in her country for CS Tomis Constanţa (2005–2008) in the second-level league Divizia A before she moved in 2009 to Turkey to join the Istanbul-based club Üsküdar Bld SK playing in the Super League. With CS Tomis Constanţa, she took part at the EHF Women's European Challenge Cup in 2005–06, finishing runner-up, 2006–07, and 2007–08. She played for Üsküdar Bld SK at the EHF Women's European Cup in 2008–09, at the EHF Women's Cup Winners' Cup in 2009–10, 2010–11, and 2011–12, at the EHF Women's European League in 2015–16,

In 2014, she transferred to Yenimahalle Bld. SK in Ankara. She participated with Yenimahalle Bld. SK at the EHF Women's European Cup in 2014–15, at the EHF Women's Cup Winners' Cup in 2015–16, as well as at the EHF Women's European League in 2015–16.

Rombescu left Yenimahalle Bld. SK in 2017, and joined Kastamonu Bld. GSK. She played at the EHF Women's European League in 2017–18, at the EHF Women's European Cup in 2017–18, 2018–19, 2019–20, at the EHF Women's European League in 2019–20.

After three seasons, she moved to İzmir Büyükşehir Bld. GSK in June 2020. With her team, she played at the EHF Women's Champions Trophy in 2020–21, at the EHF Women's European Cup in 2017–18, 2018–19, 2021–22, and 2022–23.

In the 2023–2024 season, she transferred to Yalıkavak SK. She remained in the club also the next season. She participated at the EHF Women's European Cup in 2023–24, and 2024–25.

== Honours ==
Turkish Women's Handball Super League

Üsküdar Bld. SK
Champions (1): 2010–11
Runners-up (3): 2008–09, 2009–10, 2011–12

Yenimahalle Bld. SK
Champions (1): 2014–15
Runners-up (2): 2013–14, 2016–17

Kastamonu Bld. GSK
Champions (1): 2018–19
Runners-up (1): 2017–18

İzmir Büyükşehir Bld. GSK
Third places (2): 2021–22, 2022–23

Yalıkavak SK
Champions (1): 2023–24, 2024–25.
