= Silvie Polášková =

Czech handball player

Personal information
- Nationality: Czech
- Born: 13 January 1998 (age 28) Brno, Czech Republic
- Height: 1.76 m (5 ft 9 in)

Sport
- Sport: Handball
- Position: Right back
- Current club: MKS Piotrcovia
- Number: 13

Senior clubs
- Years: Team
- –2022: DHC Sokol Poruba
- 2022–: MKS Piotrcovia
National team
Years	Team	Apps	(Gls)
2019-	Czech Republic	21	(18)
- Updated on 4 November 2023

Silvie Polášková (born 13 January 1998) is a Czech handball player for MKS Piotrcovia and the Czech national team.

She represented the Czech Republic at the 2020 European Women's Handball Championship.
