= Nurşah Sancak =

Turkish handball player (born 1997)

Personal information
- Nationality: Turkish
- Born: 24 October 1997 (age 28) Bursa, Turkey
- Height: 1.68 m (5 ft 6 in)

Sport
- Sport: Handball
- Position: Right wing
- Current club: Kastamonu Bld. GSK
- Number: 3

Senior clubs
- Years: Team
- 2018–2019: Osmangazi Bld. SK
- 2019–2022: Yalıkavak SK
- 2022–: Kastamonu Bld. GSK
National team
- Years: Team
- –: Turkey
- 2015: Turkey U-19 beach handball

Nurşah Sancak (born 24 October 1997) is a Turkish handballer, who plays in the right wing position for Kastamonu Bld. GSK in the Turkish Super League and the Turkey national team.

== Personal life ==
Nurşah Sancak was born in Bursa, Turkey on 24 October 1997. She studied at Nişantaşı University in Istanbul.

== Club career ==
She started playing handball in the high school when a handball coach founded a school team, and invited her to join. Her mother was not willing to let her participate in sports as she was very introvert. Believing in her talent, however, her class teacher convinced her mother. Her father approved from the very beginning.

She is 1.68 m (5 ft 6 in) tall. She plays in the right wing position.

=== Osmangazi Bld. SK ===
She started her sport career in the farm team of Osmangazi Bld. SK in her hometown Bursa. She was promoted to the A team, and played in the 2018–19 season of the Turkish Women's Handball Super League.

=== Yalıkavak SK ===
For the 2019–20 Super League season, she went to Bodrum, Muğla to join Yalıkavak SK. She played in total three seasons.

=== Kastamonu Bld. GSK ===
Late July 2022, she transferred to Kastamonu Bld. GSK. Mid March 2023, she suffered an anterior cruciate ligament rupture on her left leg, and underwent a reconstructive surgery in Istanbul. She won the 2022–23 Turkeish Super League with her team.

== International career ==
Sancak was admitted to the national team in June 2019. She played at the 2022 European Championship qualification.

In 2015, she was called up to the Turkey women's national under-19 beach handball team for participation at the 2015 European Beach Handball Championship's junior women's division in Lloret de Mar, Spain.

== Honours ==
Turkish Women's Handball Super League
Yalıkavak SK

Runners-up (2): 2020–21, 2021–22

Kastamonu Bld. GSK

Champions (1): 2022–23
