= Stela Posavec =

Croatian handball player (born 1996)

Personal information
- Nationality: Croatian
- Born: 26 August 1996 (age 30) Čakovec, Croatia
- Height: 1.65 m (5 ft 5 in)

Sport
- Sport: Handball
- Position: Centre back
- Current club: RK Lokomotiva Zagreb
- Number: 8

Senior clubs
- Years: Team
- –2016: ŽRK Zrinski Čakovec
- 2016–2023: RK Lokomotiva Zagreb
- 2023–2025: MKS Lublin
- 2025–: RK Lokomotiva Zagreb
National team
Years	Team	Apps	(Gls)
2016-	Croatia	83	(134)
Medal record
Women's Handball
Representing Croatia
European Championship
Bronze medal – third place	2020 Denmark
Mediterranean Games
Silver medal – second place	2022 Oran	Team
- Updated on 29 October 2026

Stela Posavec (born 26 August 1996) is a Croatian handballer for RK Lokomotiva Zagreb and the Croatian national team.

She participated at the 2018 European Women's Handball Championship.

She is Paula Posavec's twin sister.

== International honours ==
- EHF European Cup:
  - Winner: 2017
  - Runner-up: 2021
