= Diğdem Hoşgör =

Turkish women's handballer (born 1991)

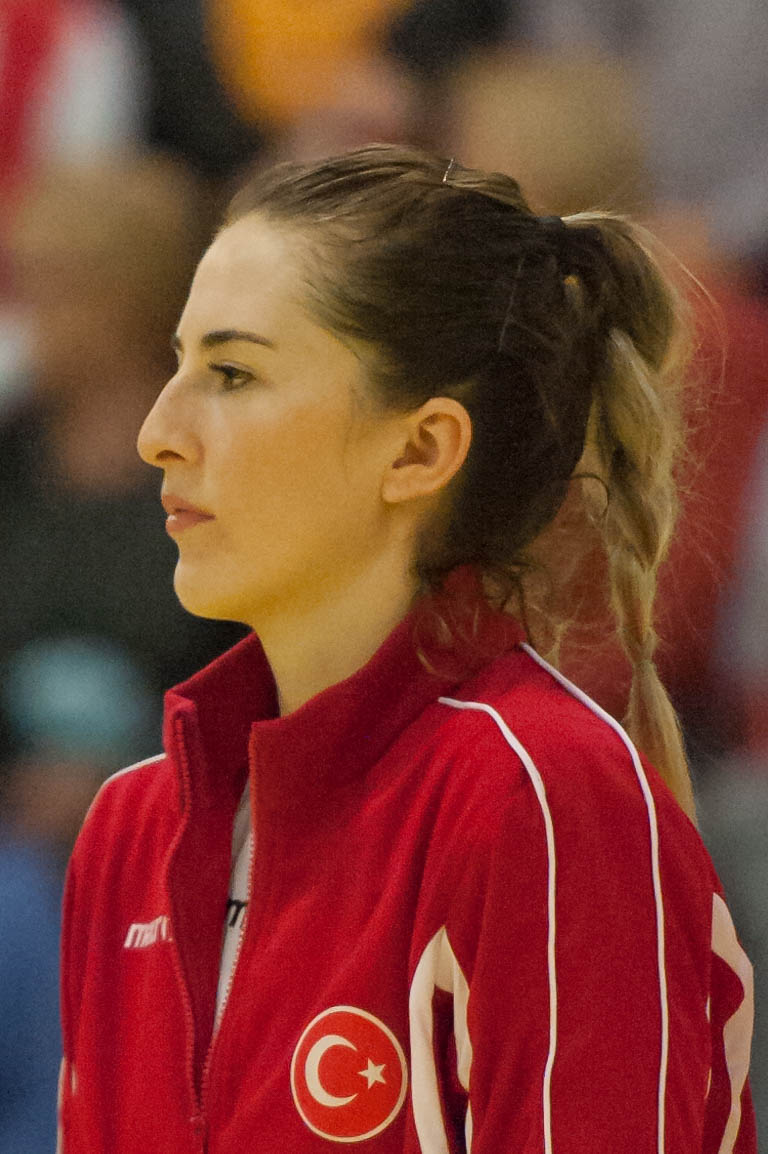
- Diğdem Hoşgör at the 2015 World Women's Handball Championship qualification.

Personal information
- Born: October 2, 1991 (age 35) Antalya, Turkey
- Height: 1.80 m (5 ft 11 in)

Sport
- Sport: Handball
- Position: Left Back
- Current club: Muratpaşa Bld. SK
- Number: 5
National team
- Years: Team
- –: Turkey

Diğdem Hoşgör (born October 2, 1991) is a Turkish women's handballer, who plays in the Turkish Women's Handball Super League for Muratpaşa Bld. SK, and the Turkey national team. The 1.80 m (5 ft 11 in)-tall sportswoman plays in the left back position.

== Private life ==
Diğdem Hoşgör was born to a handballer father in Antalya on October 2, 1991. Her older sister Sinem Hoşgör Eyövge is also a handball player.

== Playing career ==
=== Club ===
Diğdem Hoşgör plays left back in her hometown for Muratpaşa Bld. SK, which competes in the Turkish Women's Handball Super League. She enjoyed her team's third place in the 2010–11 season. Her team became consecutive three seasons league champion in 2011–12, 2012–13, 2013–14. In the 2014–15 season, her team lost the champion title in the play-offs. She is the team's top scorer.

Hoşgör took part in the Women's EHF Challenge Cup matches in 2010–11 and 2011–12, with her team finishing both seasons as runner-up. She played in the Women's EHF Cup Winners' Cup matches (2012–13 and 2013–14), in the Women's EHF Champions League competitions (2012–13 and 2013–14) as well as in the Women's EHF Cup games (2014–15 and 2015–16).

=== International ===
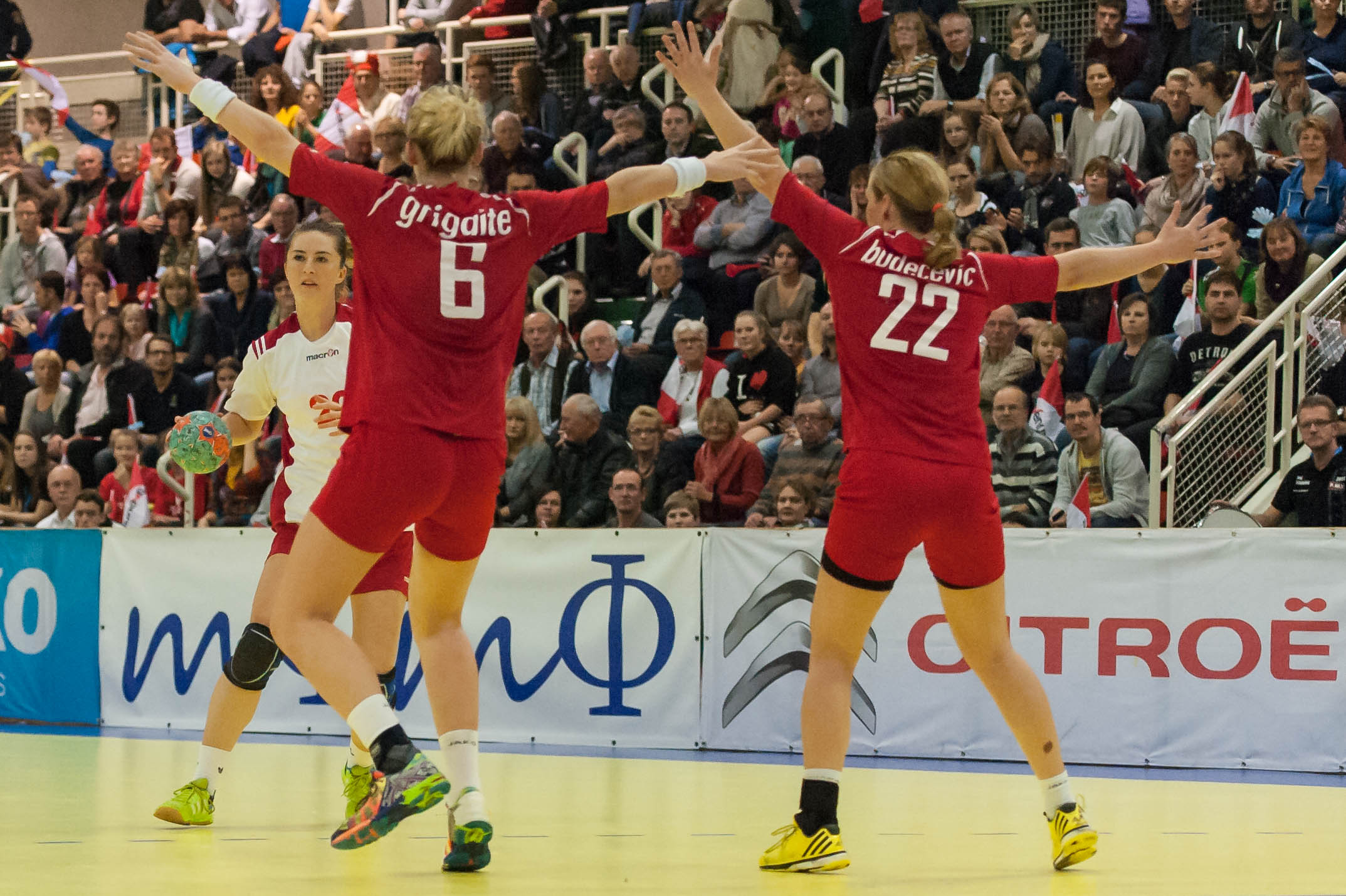
Diğdem Hoşgör (white/red) attacking Austria in the 2015 World Women's Handball Championship European qualification match.

In 2009, she was called up to the Turkey women's national beach handball team.

Diğdem Hoşgör was admitted to the Turkey women's national handball team in January 2010. She is part of the national team since then. She played in the European Women's Handball Championship qualification matches of 2014 and 2016. In 2013, she took part in the Mediterranean Games.

== Honours ==
Turkish Women's Handball Super League

- Winners (2): 2011–12, 2012–13, 2013–14.
- Runner-up (1): 2014–15.
- Third place (1): 2010–11
