= Monika Janeska =

Macedonian female handballer (born 1993)

Monika Janeska Kıldan
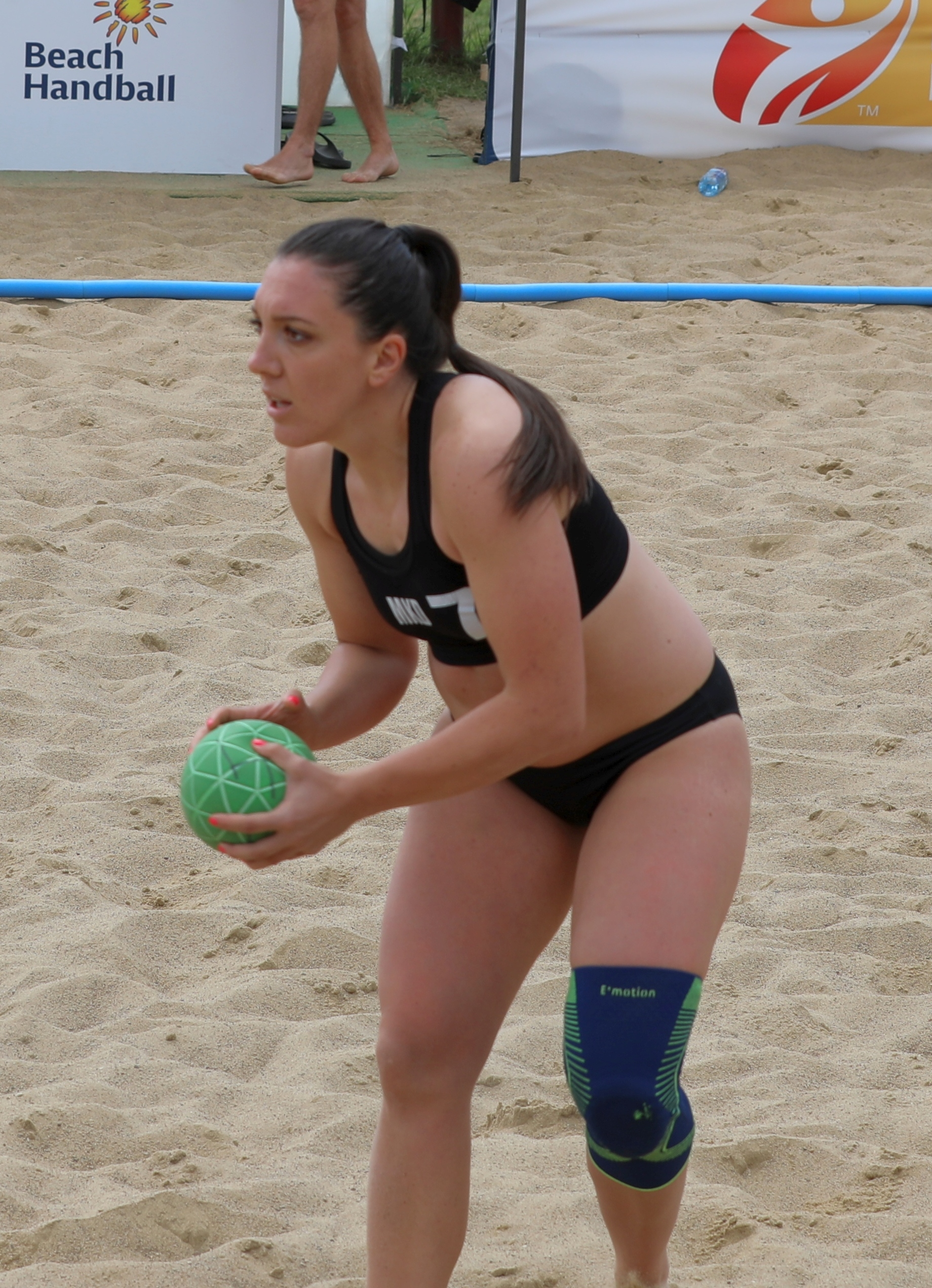

Personal information
- Nationality: Macedonian and Turkish
- Born: 17 May 1993 (age 33) Gostivar, Macedonia
- Height: 1.73 m (5 ft 8 in)

Sport
- Sport: Handball
- Position: Centre back
- Current club: Bursa Büyükşehir SK
- Number: 10

Senior clubs
- Years: Team
- 2009-2010: ŽRK Vardar
- 2010-2016: ŽRK Gevgelija
- 2016-2017: Mosonmagyaróvári KCSE
- 2021-2024: Konyaaltı Belediyesi SK
- 2025 - 2026: Ortahisar Belediye SK
- 2026 -: Bursa Büyükşehir SK
National team
Years	Team	Apps	(Gls)
2011–	North Macedonia	19	(41)
- Updated on 15 November 2022

Monika Janeska Kıldan (born 17 May 1993) is a Macedonian female handballer for Bursa Büyükşehir Bld. SK. and the North Macedonia national team.

She represented the North Macedonia at the 2022 European Women's Handball Championship.

She won EHF European Cup in 2023 with Konyaaltı Belediyesi SK.
