= Celal Atik Sports Hall =

Sport venue in İzmir, Turkey

Celal Atik Sports Hall Celal Atik Spor Salonu
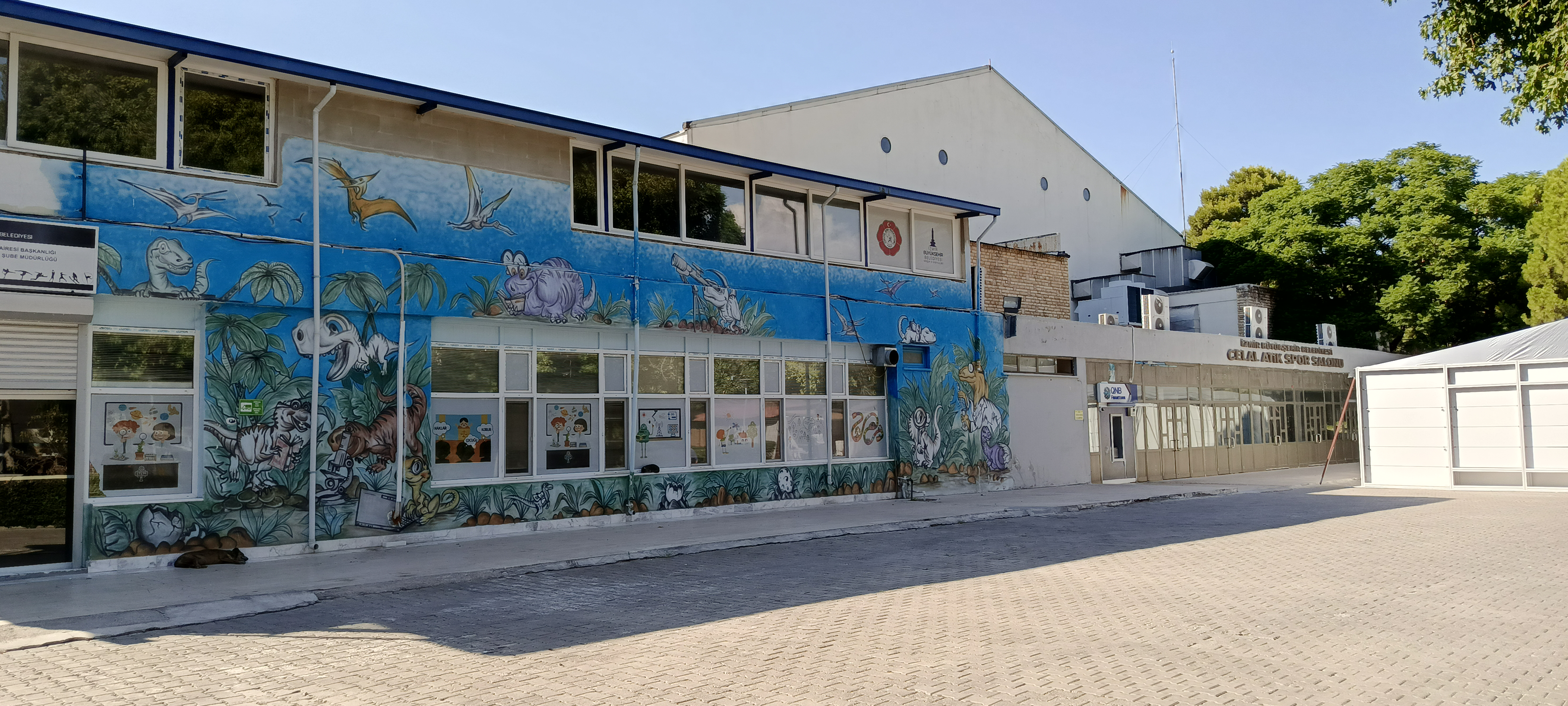
- Celal Atik Sports Hall (2024)
- Interactive map of Celal Atik Sports Hall; Celal Atik Spor Salonu
- Location: Kültürpark, Konak, İzmir, Turkey
- Coordinates: 38.425903°N 27.143566°E
- Owner: İzmir Metropolitan Municipality (İBB)
- Capacity: 1,700

Construction
- Opened: 1989; 37 years ago

Tenants
- İzmir Büyükşehir Belediyesi GSK; Göztepe S.K.

Celal Atik Sports Hall (Turkish: Celal Atik Spor Salonu), formerly Fuar Kapalı Salonu ("Fairground Hall") is a sports venue in İzmir, Turkey. Owned by the İzmir Metropolitan Municipality, it was opened in 1989 and is used mainly for basketball, handball and volleyball competitions.

== Overview ==
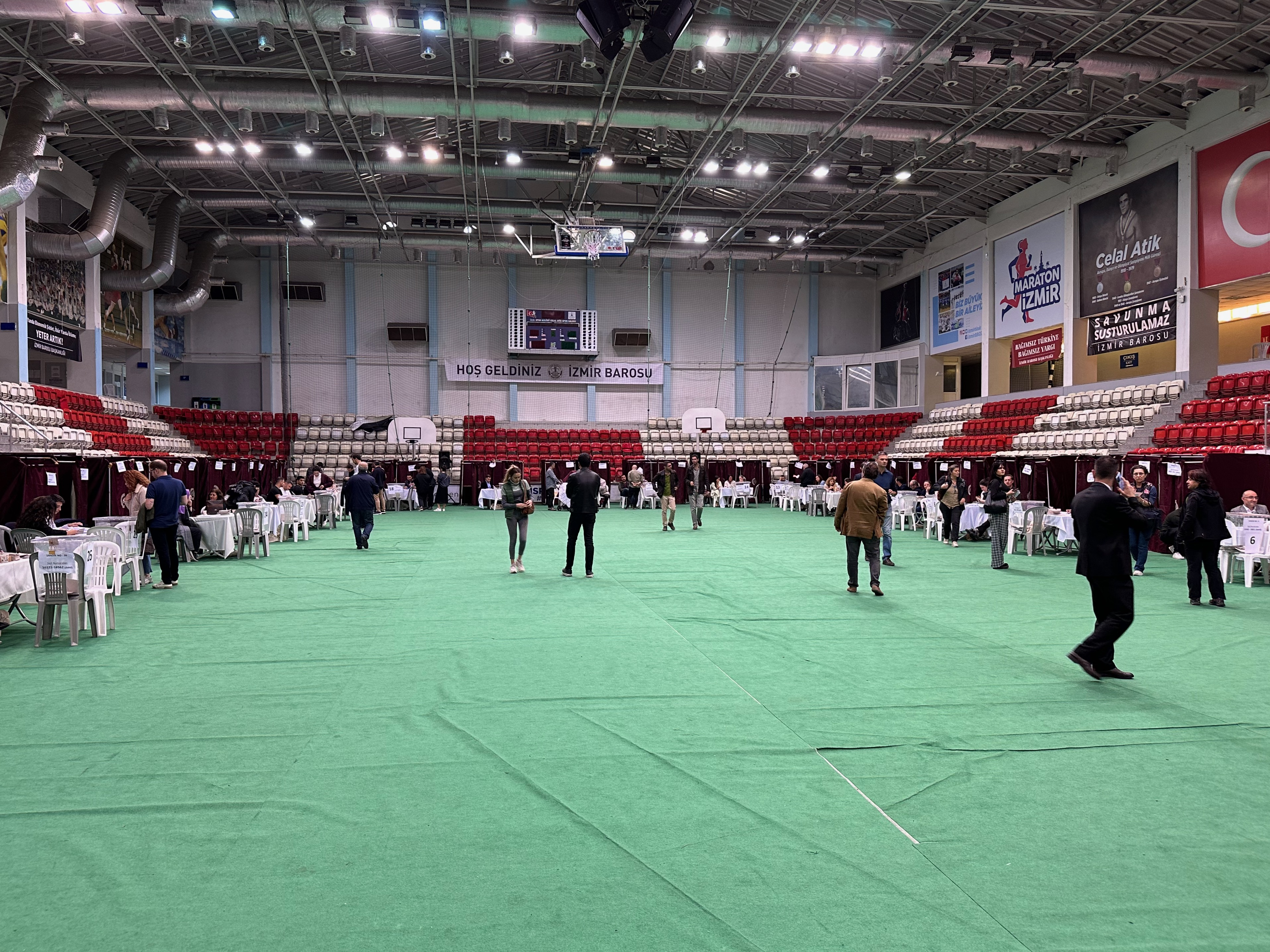
Inside view of Celal Atik Sports Hall during the 2022 İzmir Bar Election.

The sports hall is named in honor of Celal Atik (1920–1979), the Olympic, world and European champion sport wrestler. The hall is situated within Kültürpark, the İzmir International Fair ground, at Mimar Sinan Mah., 9 Eylül Square 9/1 in Konak District of İzmir, and was a former fairground hall. Owned by the Metropolitan Municipality of İzmir and opened in 1989, the sports hall mainly serves as a venue for basketball, handball, volleyballcompetitions, as well is used for many other sportive other events like futsal, gymnastics, taekwondo, judo, fencing, swimming training etc. It is home to the teams of İzmir Büyükşehir Belediyesi GSK, and Göztepe S.K.. The sports hall features also two swimming pools, 16 m × 25 m (52 ft × 82 ft) for seniors and 6.80 m × 12 m (22.3 ft × 39.4 ft) for children and disabled sportspeople. It has a seating capacity for 1,700 spectators.

== See also ==
- List of indoor arenas in Turkey
