= Valeriia Baranik =

Russian handball player

Personal information
- Nationality: Russian
- Born: November 17, 1993 (age 32) Syzran, Russia
- Height: 1.80 m (5 ft 11 in)

Sport
- Sport: Handball
- Position: Line Player
- Current club: PAOK
- Number: 93
National team
- Years: Team
- –: Russia

Valeriia Baranik (born Russian: Валерия Бараник; November 17, 1993) is a Russian handballer playing in the Greek Women's Handball Championship for PAOK and the Russia national team. The 1.80 m (5 ft 11 in)-tall sportswoman is line player.

She played for HC Lada Togliatti and Rostov-Don in her country and for BNTU Minsk in Belarus before she transferred to the Antalya-based team Muratpaşa Bld. SK in July 2015.
