= Gümbet, Bodrum =

Village in Turkey

Gümbet
- Neighbourhood
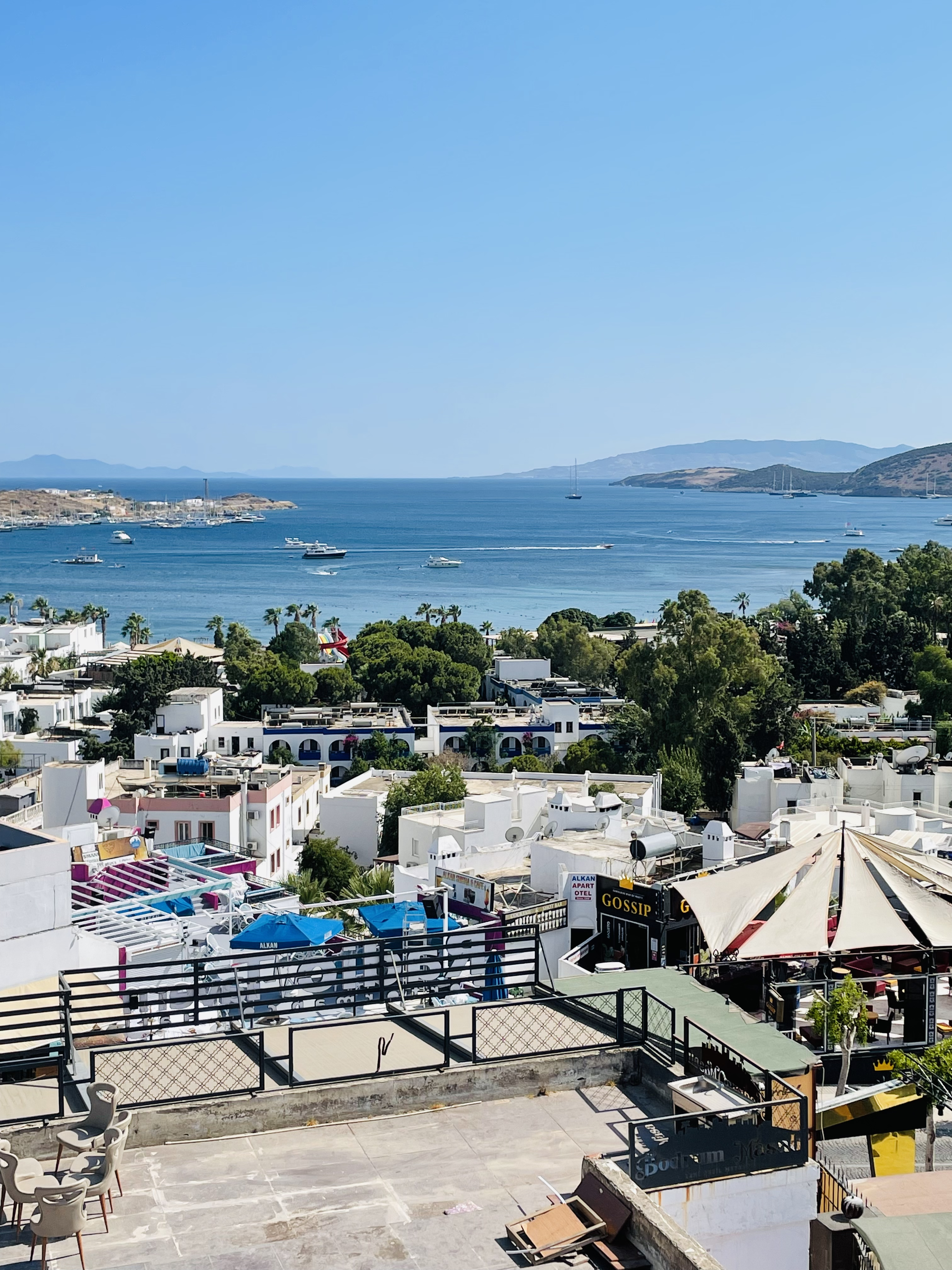
- Bodrum Gumbet

- Location within Turkey Location within Turkey Aegean
- Country: Turkey
- Province: Muğla
- District: Bodrum
- Population (2024): 3,457
- Time zone: UTC+3 (TRT)

Gümbet is a neighbourhood in the municipality and district of Bodrum, Muğla Province, Turkey. Its population is 3,457 (2024).
