= 2010 European Women's Handball Championship qualification =

This page describes the qualifying procedure for the 2010 European Women's Handball Championship.

== Qualification system ==
=== Seeding ===
The draw for the qualification round was held on 24 March 2009 at the EHF headquarters, in Vienna. The host countries, Norway and Denmark, are directly qualified. The remaining 29 teams were divided into several pots according to the "EHF Women's National Team Ranking", and were successfully drawn so that each qualification group contained one team from each pot. The two lowest ranked teams, Finland and Great Britain, participated in a pre-qualification tournament to decide the 28th spot.

Pot 1	Pot 2	Pot 3	Pot 4
Russia; Germany; Spain; Hungary; France; Croatia; Romania	Sweden; Macedonia; Poland; Ukraine; Austria; Serbia; Belarus	Netherlands; Slovenia; Portugal; Turkey; Slovakia; Czech Republic; Iceland	Lithuania; Italy; Montenegro; Switzerland; Azerbaijan; Greece; Finland/Great Britain

=== Playing dates ===
- Pre-qualification: September 2009
- Rounds 1 and 2: 14–18 October 2009
- Rounds 3 and 4: 31 March – 4 April 2010
- Rounds 5 and 6: 26–30 May 2010

== Tiebreakers ==
If two or more teams are equal on points on completion of the group matches, the following criteria are applied to determine the rankings.

1. Higher number of points obtained in the group matches played among the teams in question.
2. Superior goal difference from the group matches played among the teams in question.
3. Higher number of goals scored in the group matches played among the teams in question.
4. If, after applying criteria 1) to 3) to several teams, two or more teams still have an equal ranking, the criteria 1) to 3) will be reapplied to determine the ranking of these teams. If this procedure does not lead to a decision, criteria 5), 6) and 7) will apply.
5. Superior goal difference from all group matches played.
6. Higher number of goals scored in all group matches played.
7. Drawing of lots.

== Pre-Qualification ==
The two pre-qualification matches were played on 23 and 26 September. Great Britain won 41–37 on aggregate score and advanced to qualification group 3.

23 September 2009; 19:00	Finland	14 – 17	Great Britain	Pirkkola, Helsinki; Attendance: 500; Referees: Rakytina, Tkachuk (UKR)
23 September 2009; 19:00	Roos, Tallqvist, Wiberg 3	(7-9)	Hegelund, Jensen Cannon 3	Pirkkola, Helsinki; Attendance: 500; Referees: Rakytina, Tkachuk (UKR)
23 September 2009; 19:00		(Report)		Pirkkola, Helsinki; Attendance: 500; Referees: Rakytina, Tkachuk (UKR)

26 September 2009; 18:00	Great Britain	24 – 23	Finland	Liverpool Echo Arena, Liverpool; Attendance: 2000; Referees: van Dijk, Wijtenburg (NED)
26 September 2009; 18:00	Goodwin 7	(13-8)	Johansson, Tallqvist 5	Liverpool Echo Arena, Liverpool; Attendance: 2000; Referees: van Dijk, Wijtenburg (NED)
26 September 2009; 18:00		(Report)		Liverpool Echo Arena, Liverpool; Attendance: 2000; Referees: van Dijk, Wijtenburg (NED)

== Groups ==
The draw for the qualification round defined the groups shown below. A provisional match schedule was elaborated and distributed to all national federations taking part in this round.

Key:

- Teams highlighted in green qualified for the tournament.

=== Group 1 ===
Pos	Team	Pld	W	D	L	GF	GA	GD	Pts	Qualification	UKR	ROU	SUI	POR
1	Ukraine	6	5	1	0	197	160	+37	11	Final tournament	—	27–27	33–20	32–23
2	Romania	6	4	1	1	219	153	+66	9	Final tournament	35–36	—	37–26	37–23
3	Switzerland	6	2	0	4	143	184	−41	4		24–33	18–39	—	28–25
4	Portugal	6	0	0	6	142	204	−62	0		31–36	23–44	17–27	—

Source: EHF

=== Group 2 ===
Pos	Team	Pld	W	D	L	GF	GA	GD	Pts	Qualification	HUN	SWE	CZE	AZE
1	Hungary	6	6	0	0	174	134	+40	12	Final tournament	—	26–24	24–20	35–26
2	Sweden	6	4	0	2	167	128	+39	8	Final tournament	26–27	—	31–25	31–11
3	Czech Republic	6	2	0	4	152	158	−6	4		23–31	21–28	—	37–25
4	Azerbaijan	6	0	0	6	114	187	−73	0		15–31	18–27	19–26	—

Source: EHF

=== Group 3 ===
Pos	Team	Pld	W	D	L	GF	GA	GD	Pts	Qualification	FRA	ISL	AUT	GBR
1	France	6	6	0	0	191	124	+67	12	Final tournament	—	32–23	29–22	34–15
2	Iceland	6	3	0	3	166	146	+20	6	Final tournament	24–27	—	29–25	40–20
3	Austria	6	3	0	3	150	145	+5	6		24–27	26–23	—	30–20
4	Great Britain	6	0	0	6	104	196	−92	0		16–42	16–27	17–23	—

Source: EHF

=== Group 4 ===
Pos	Team	Pld	W	D	L	GF	GA	GD	Pts	Qualification	GER	SLO	BLR	ITA
1	Germany	6	6	0	0	205	129	+76	12	Final tournament	—	27–17	35–24	45–19
2	Slovenia	6	3	0	3	163	162	+1	6	Final tournament	24–35	—	30–21	34–22
3	Belarus	6	3	0	3	166	176	−10	6		26–30	31–30	—	32–23
4	Italy	6	0	0	6	137	204	−67	0		19–33	26–28	28–32	—

Source: EHF

=== Group 5 ===
Pos	Team	Pld	W	D	L	GF	GA	GD	Pts	Qualification	ESP	SRB	TUR	GRE
1	Spain	6	6	0	0	181	128	+53	12	Final tournament	—	29–25	30–26	39–16
2	Serbia	6	4	0	2	179	142	+37	8	Final tournament	20–21	—	28–27	45–18
3	Turkey	6	2	0	4	167	156	+11	4		27–30	30–32	—	30–22
4	Greece	6	0	0	6	101	202	−101	0		14–32	17–29	14–27	—

Source: EHF

=== Group 6 ===
Pos	Team	Pld	W	D	L	GF	GA	GD	Pts	Qualification	MNE	RUS	SVK	POL
1	Montenegro	6	5	1	0	196	160	+36	11	Final tournament	—	28–28	39–24	35–32
2	Russia	6	4	1	1	196	155	+41	9	Final tournament	28–31	—	33–26	35–20
3	Slovakia	6	1	0	5	156	193	−37	2		27–32	24–37	—	32–28
4	Poland	6	1	0	5	151	191	−40	2		21–31	26–35	24–23	—

Source: EHF

=== Group 7 ===
Pos	Team	Pld	W	D	L	GF	GA	GD	Pts	Qualification	CRO	NED	MKD	LTU
1	Croatia	6	5	0	1	191	138	+53	10	Final tournament	—	32–23	36–23	31–22
2	Netherlands	6	3	2	1	161	146	+15	8	Final tournament	25–24	—	20–20	34–20
3	Macedonia	6	2	2	2	157	153	+4	6		21–26	28–28	—	32–24
4	Lithuania	6	0	0	6	131	203	−72	0		24–42	22–31	19–33	—

Source: EHF
