= List of official matches of the Montenegro women's handball team =

The Montenegro women's national handball team represents Montenegro in international handball competitions. The national team was formed in 2006 after the Montenegrin independence.

The team made their debut match in the November 2006. Except for qualifying matches, Montenegro played on World Championship, European Championship and Olympic Games.

The women's handball team is among most successful national teams of Montenegro. They won Montenegro's first ever Olympic medal in 2012 by reaching the final. The same year, Montenegro was a champion of Europe.

== Honours ==
Below are major achievements of Montenegro women's national handball team in international competitions.

- Olympic Games:
  - Silver (2nd): 2012
- European Championship:
  - Winners: 2012
  - Third place: 2022
  - Semifinalists: 2014

== Tournaments ==
The Montenegrin national team has participated in many international competitions, including the Summer Olympics, World Championship and European Championship.

Tournament	Matches	Wins	Draws	Loss
Olympic Games	19	6	1	12
World Championship	52	28	2	22
European Championship	46	27	1	18
Qualifying matches EC/WC/OG	70	56	5	9
OVERALL	187	117	9	61

== Records ==
Biggest victory
42:15, Montenegro – China, 7 December 2011, Santos

Biggest defeat
25:42, Montenegro – Netherlands, 16 November 2022, Skopje

Longest unbeaten streak
9 matches, (14 June 2009 - 11 December 2010)

Longest losing streak
6 matches, (6 August 2016 - 6 December 2016)

Most scored goals in a match
42, Montenegro – China 42:15, Czech Republic – Montenegro 26:42

Most goals against in a match
42, Montenegro – Netherlands 25:42

== Results ==
Below is the list of all official matches of Montenegro national handball team.

Date	Opponent	Result	Venue	Att	Competition
28/11/2006	Bulgaria	32–28	Cheb	300	WCQ
29/11/2006	Turkey	30–28	Cheb	250	WCQ
01/12/2006	Czech Republic	23–24	Cheb	2,000	WCQ
02/12/2006	Bosnia and Herzegovina	31–27	Cheb	200	WCQ
03/12/2006	Greece	35–24	Cheb	200	WCQ
27/11/2007	Azerbaijan	31–21	Michalovce	500	ECQ
28/11/2007	Switzerland	34–26	Michalovce	200	ECQ
01/12/2007	Slovakia	30–34	Michalovce	1,200	ECQ
02/12/2007	Portugal	33–26	Michalovce	300	ECQ
31/05/2008	Croatia	40–35	Podgorica	4,000	ECQ
07/06/2008	Croatia	23–31	Kutina	2,000	ECQ
25/11/2008	Slovenia	32–22	Pljevlja	2,000	WCQ
26/11/2008	Finland	37–24	Pljevlja	2,000	WCQ
28/11/2008	Bulgaria	40–21	Pljevlja	2,000	WCQ
29/11/2008	Azerbaijan	41–20	Pljevlja	2,000	WCQ
30/11/2008	Italy	32–28	Pljevlja	1,500	WCQ
07/06/2009	Sweden	17–24	Skövde	1,700	WCQ
14/06/2009	Sweden	28–28	Pljevlja	2,500	WCQ
14/10/2009	Poland	31–21	Lublin	1,800	ECQ
17/10/2009	Russia	28–28	Podgorica	4,000	ECQ
31/03/2010	Slovakia	39–24	Pljevlja	2,500	ECQ
04/04/2010	Slovakia	32–27	Hlohovec	500	ECQ
26/05/2010	Poland	35–32	Pljevlja	2,500	ECQ
30/05/2010	Russia	31–28	Chekhov	500	ECQ
07/12/2010	Russia	24–22	Aarhus	600	European Championship 2010
09/12/2010	Iceland	26–23	Aarhus	1,200	European Championship 2010
11/12/2010	Croatia	28–29	Aarhus	1,000	European Championship 2010
13/12/2010	Spain	22–20	Herning	3,000	European Championship 2010
14/12/2010	Romania	21–23	Herning	3,420	European Championship 2010
16/12/2010	Denmark	30–29	Herning	11,461	European Championship 2010
18/12/2010	France	19–23	Herning	3,320	European Championship 2010
03/06/2011	Czech Republic	42–26	Olomuc	1,000	WCQ
10/06/2011	Czech Republic	33–26	Pljevlja	2,000	WCQ
19/10/2011	Great Britain	34–18	Herceg Novi	1,000	ECQ
22/10/2011	Poland	31–27	Chorzów	1,000	ECQ
03/12/2011	Iceland	21–22	Santos	1,200	World Championship 2011
04/12/2011	Germany	25–24	Santos	500	World Championship 2011
06/12/2011	Angola	28–26	Santos	350	World Championship 2011
07/12/2011	China	42–15	Santos	200	World Championship 2011
09/12/2011	Norway	27–28	Santos	1,000	World Championship 2011
11/12/2011	Spain	19–23	Barueri	700	World Championship 2011
21/03/2012	Russia	23–22	Podgorica	4,000	ECQ
25/03/2012	Russia	23–24	Rostov-Don	2,500	ECQ
25/05/2012	Japan	30–24	Lyon	1,500	OGQ
26/05/2012	Romania	34–23	Lyon	3,200	OGQ
27/05/2012	France	22–20	Lyon	4,500	OGQ
30/05/2012	Great Britain	37–22	London	500	ECQ
03/06/2012	Poland	32–23	Podgorica	3,000	ECQ
28/07/2012	Great Britain	31–19	London	3,941	Olympic Games 2012
30/07/2012	Brazil	25–27	London	3,974	Olympic Games 2012
01/08/2012	Angola	30–25	London	4,354	Olympic Games 2012
03/08/2012	Croatia	26–27	London	4,541	Olympic Games 2012
05/08/2012	Russia	25–25	London	4,444	Olympic Games 2012
07/08/2012	France	23–22	London	4,559	Olympic Games 2012
09/08/2012	Spain	27–26	London	9,087	Olympic Games 2012
11/08/2012	Norway	23–26	London	9,739	FINAL
04/12/2012	Iceland	26–16	Vršac	2,800	European Championship 2012
05/12/2012	Russia	30–27	Vršac	1,500	European Championship 2012
07/12/2012	Romania	23–20	Vršac	4,000	European Championship 2012
09/12/2012	Hungary	28–26	Novi Sad	1,500	European Championship 2012
11/12/2012	Germany	20–27	Novi Sad	1,000	European Championship 2012
13/12/2012	Spain	27–23	Novi Sad	1,200	European Championship 2012
15/12/2012	Serbia	27–26	Belgrade	13,000	European Championship 2012
16/12/2012	Norway	34–31	Belgrade	10,000	FINAL
07/12/2013	South Korea	23–22	Belgrade	1,100	World Championship 2013
08/12/2013	DR Congo	35–9	Belgrade	800	World Championship 2013
10/12/2013	Dominican Republic	33–19	Belgrade	300	World Championship 2013
11/12/2013	France	16–17	Belgrade	600	World Championship 2013
13/12/2013	Netherlands	27–25	Belgrade	600	World Championship 2013
15/12/2013	Denmark	21–22	Belgrade	1,500	World Championship 2013
23/10/2013	Poland	25–21	Podgorica	3,500	ECQ
27/10/2013	Portugal	29–24	Coimbra	1,000	ECQ
26/03/2014	Czech Republic	24–23	Most	1,100	ECQ
30/03/2014	Czech Republic	25–22	Bijelo Polje	3,000	ECQ
11/06/2014	Poland	25–22	Częstochowa	6,700	ECQ
15/06/2014	Portugal	22–22	Nikšić	1,000	ECQ
08/12/2014	Serbia	22–19	Osijek	2,200	European Championship 2014
10/12/2014	Slovakia	28–24	Osijek	2,000	European Championship 2014
12/12/2014	France	20–24	Osijek	2,000	European Championship 2014
14/12/2014	Germany	27–20	Zagreb	1,200	European Championship 2014
16/12/2014	Netherlands	31–27	Zagreb	1,500	European Championship 2014
17/12/2014	Sweden	30–29	Zagreb	1,000	European Championship 2014
19/12/2014	Spain	18–19	Budapest	3,500	European Championship 2014
21/12/2014	Sweden	23–25	Budapest	5,500	3rd place match
07/06/2015	Iceland	28–19	Podgorica	2,000	WCQ
14/06/2015	Iceland	19–19	Reykjavík	600	WCQ
07/10/2015	Macedonia	21–14	Bar	2,200	ECQ
11/10/2015	Slovenia	22–20	Ljubljana	1,000	ECQ
05/12/2015	Serbia	28–28	Herning	4,700	World Championship 2015
06/12/2015	Japan	29–23	Herning	2,500	World Championship 2015
08/12/2015	Hungary	32–15	Herning	7,000	World Championship 2015
09/12/2015	Tunisia	37–26	Herning	1,700	World Championship 2015
11/12/2015	Denmark	23–21	Herning	12,500	World Championship 2015
14/12/2015	Angola	38–28	Herning	1,500	World Championship 2015
16/12/2015	Norway	25–26	Kolding	2,800	World Championship 2015
18/12/2015	Denmark	20–28	Herning	9,800	World Championship 2015
20/12/2015	France	23–34	Herning	1,000	World Championship 2015
10/03/2016	Croatia	22–23	Split	4,500	ECQ
12/03/2016	Croatia	31–29	Bar	3,500	ECQ
18/03/2016	Uruguay	34–19	Aarhus	1,100	OGQ
19/03/2016	Denmark	26–22	Aarhus	3,200	OGQ
20/03/2016	Romania	23–23	Aarhus	1,200	OGQ
02/06/2016	Macedonia	27–21	Skopje	600	ECQ
05/06/2016	Slovenia	24–22	Bijelo Polje	2,000	ECQ
06/08/2016	Spain	19–25	Rio de Janeiro	8,000	Olympic Games 2016
08/08/2016	Angola	25–27	Rio de Janeiro	2,000	Olympic Games 2016
10/08/2016	Romania	21–25	Rio de Janeiro	1,500	Olympic Games 2016
12/08/2016	Norway	19–28	Rio de Janeiro	3,000	Olympic Games 2016
14/08/2016	Brazil	23–29	Rio de Janeiro	10,000	Olympic Games 2016
05/12/2016	Denmark	21–22	Malmö	2,000	European Championship 2016
07/12/2016	Czech Republic	28–27	Malmö	1,000	European Championship 2016
09/12/2016	Hungary	14–21	Malmö	1,500	European Championship 2016
09/06/2017	Belarus	33–26	Bar	2,000	WCQ
15/06/2017	Belarus	23–25	Minsk	1,800	WCQ
28/09/2017	Slovakia	24–23	Bar	2,100	ECQ
01/10/2017	Italy	23–16	Brescia	2,000	ECQ
02/12/2017	Denmark	31–24	Oldenburg	3,100	World Championship 2017
03/12/2017	Russia	24–28	Oldenburg	2,300	World Championship 2017
05/12/2017	Japan	28–29	Oldenburg	1,100	World Championship 2017
06/12/2017	Tunisia	29–23	Oldenburg	2,000	World Championship 2017
08/12/2017	Brazil	23–23	Oldenburg	3,700	World Championship 2017
10/12/2017	Serbia	31–29	Magdeburg	3,000	World Championship 2017
12/12/2017	France	22–25	Leipzig	2,100	World Championship 2017
21/03/2018	Poland	26–20	Gdynia	2,000	ECQ
24/03/2018	Poland	33–23	Pljevlja	4,000	ECQ
31/05/2018	Slovakia	27–24	Michalovce	1,200	ECQ
02/06/2018	Italy	28–22	Podgorica	1,500	ECQ
30/11/2018	Slovenia	36–32	Nancy	2,000	European Championship 2018
02/12/2018	Russia	23–24	Nancy	3,500	European Championship 2018
04/12/2018	France	20–25	Nancy	5,300	European Championship 2018
06/12/2018	Sweden	30–28	Nantes	2,800	European Championship 2018
10/12/2018	Serbia	28–27	Nantes	2,500	European Championship 2018
12/12/2018	Denmark	23–24	Nantes	4,000	European Championship 2018
31/05/2019	Czech Republic	24–26	Most	800	WCQ
02/06/2019	Czech Republic	25–23	Nikšić	4,100	WCQ
25/09/2019	Italy	41–17	Pljevlja	2,400	ECQ
29/09/2019	Lithuania	32–24	Klaipėda	500	ECQ
30/11/2019	Senegal	29–24	Kumamoto	1,900	World Championship 2019
01/12/2019	Kazakhstan	30–21	Kumamoto	2,000	World Championship 2019
03/12/2019	Hungary	25–24	Kumamoto	1,600	World Championship 2019
05/12/2019	Romania	27–26	Kumamoto	1,700	World Championship 2019
05/12/2019	Spain	26–27	Kumamoto	2,000	World Championship 2019
08/12/2019	Japan	30–26	Kumamoto	7,400	World Championship 2019
10/12/2019	Russia	28–35	Kumamoto	6,400	World Championship 2019
11/12/2019	Sweden	26–23	Kumamoto	2,000	World Championship 2019
13/12/2019	Serbia	28–26	Kumamoto	6,000	World Championship 2019
04/12/2020	France	23–24	Herning	-	European Championship 2020
06/12/2020	Denmark	19–28	Herning	-	European Championship 2020
08/12/2020	Slovenia	26–25	Herning	-	European Championship 2020
10/12/2020	Russia	23–24	Herning	-	European Championship 2020
13/12/2020	Sweden	31–25	Herning	-	European Championship 2020
15/12/2020	Spain	26–26	Herning	-	European Championship 2020
29/03/2021	Norway	28–23	Podgorica	-	OGQ
29/03/2021	Romania	25–28	Podgorica	-	OGQ
16/04/2021	Belarus	29–23	Podgorica	-	WCQ
20/04/2021	Belarus	26–24	Minsk	600	WCQ
25/07/2021	Angola	33–22	Tokyo	-	Olympic Games 2020
27/07/2021	Japan	26–29	Tokyo	-	Olympic Games 2020
29/07/2021	Norway	23–35	Tokyo	-	Olympic Games 2020
31/07/2021	South Korea	28–26	Tokyo	-	Olympic Games 2020
02/08/2021	Netherlands	29–30	Tokyo	-	Olympic Games 2020
04/08/2021	Russia	26–32	Tokyo	-	Olympic Games 2020
03/12/2021	Slovenia	18–28	Granollers	1,000	World Championship 2021
05/12/2021	Angola	30–20	Granollers	1,300	World Championship 2021
07/12/2021	France	19–24	Granollers	2,500	World Championship 2021
09/12/2021	Serbia	25–27	Granollers	800	World Championship 2021
11/12/2021	Russia	25–31	Granollers	800	World Championship 2021
13/12/2021	Poland	28–33	Granollers	400	World Championship 2021
05/11/2022	Spain	30–23	Podgorica	3,200	European Championship 2022
07/11/2022	Germany	29–25	Podgorica	3,600	European Championship 2022
09/11/2022	Poland	26–23	Podgorica	4,500	European Championship 2022
13/11/2022	France	19–27	Skopje	1,000	European Championship 2022
15/11/2022	Romania	35–34	Skopje	1,000	European Championship 2022
16/11/2022	Netherlands	25–42	Skopje	900	European Championship 2022
18/11/2022	Denmark	23–27	Ljubljana	3,600	European Championship 2022
20/11/2022	France	27–25	Ljubljana	5,400	Third Place Game
11/10/2023	Turkey	39–23	Podgorica	1,500	ECQ
11/10/2023	Bulgaria	34–20	Shumen	1,000	ECQ
30/11/2023	Cameroon	25–11	Helsingborgs	750	World Championship 2023
01/12/2023	Paraguay	41–26	Helsingborgs	1,000	World Championship 2023
03/12/2023	Hungary	24–18	Helsingborgs	1,100	World Championship 2023
07/12/2023	Croatia	25–26	Gothenburg	1,100	World Championship 2023
09/12/2023	Senegal	29–21	Gothenburg	3,000	World Championship 2023
11/12/2023	Sweden	25–32	Gothenburg	6,600	World Championship 2023
13/12/2023	Denmark	24–26	Herning	11,000	World Championship 2023
15/12/2023	Netherlands	25–28	Herning	1,600	World Championship 2023
17/12/2023	Czech Republic	28–24	Herning	500	World Championship 2023

WCQ - World Championship qualifiers; ECQ - European Championship qualifiers; OGQ - Olympic Games qualifiers

== Montenegro vs. other countries ==
Below is the list of performances of Montenegro national handball team against every single opponent.

Opponents' country	G	W	D	L
Angola	6	5	0	1
Azerbaijan	2	2	0	0
Belarus	4	3	0	1
Bosnia and Herzegovina	1	1	0	0
Brazil	3	0	1	2
Bulgaria	3	3	0	0
Cameroon	1	1	0	0
China	1	1	0	0
Croatia	7	2	0	5
Czech Republic	9	7	0	2
Denmark	11	4	0	7
Dominican Republic	1	1	0	0
DR Congo	1	1	0	0
Finland	1	1	0	0
France	12	3	0	9
Germany	4	3	0	1
Greece	1	1	0	0
Great Britain	3	3	0	0
Hungary	5	4	0	1
Iceland	5	3	1	1
Italy	4	4	0	0
Japan	5	3	0	2
Kazakhstan	1	1	0	0
Lithuania	1	1	0	0
Netherlands	5	2	0	3
North Macedonia	2	2	0	0
Norway	7	2	0	5
Paraguay	1	1	0	0
Poland	10	9	0	1
Portugal	3	2	1	0
Romania	7	3	1	3
Russia	13	4	2	7
Senegal	2	2	0	0
Serbia	7	5	1	1
South Korea	2	2	0	0
Slovakia	6	5	0	1
Slovenia	6	5	0	1
Spain	9	4	1	4
Sweden	8	4	1	3
Switzerland	1	1	0	0
Tunisia	2	2	0	0
Turkey	2	2	0	0
Uruguay	1	1	0	0
OVERALL	187	117	9	61

As of February 2024

== See also ==
- Handball Federation of Montenegro
