= 2010 European Women's Handball Championship qualification – Group 2 =

== Group 2 Qualifiers and Results ==
| Pos | Team | Pld | W | D | L | GF | GA | GD | Pts | Qualification | HUN | SWE | CZE | AZE |
|---|---|---|---|---|---|---|---|---|---|---|---|---|---|---|
| 1 | Hungary | 6 | 6 | 0 | 0 | 174 | 134 | +40 | 12 | Final tournament | — | 26–24 | 24–20 | 35–26 |
| 2 | Sweden | 6 | 4 | 0 | 2 | 167 | 128 | +39 | 8 | Final tournament | 26–27 | — | 31–25 | 31–11 |
| 3 | Czech Republic | 6 | 2 | 0 | 4 | 152 | 158 | −6 | 4 | | 23–31 | 21–28 | — | 37–25 |
| 4 | Azerbaijan | 6 | 0 | 0 | 6 | 114 | 187 | −73 | 0 | | 15–31 | 18–27 | 19–26 | — |

Source: EHF

All times are local

| 15 October 2009; 19:00 | Hungary | 24–20 | Czech Republic | Messzi István Sportcsarnok, Kecskemét; Attendance: 1,800; Referees: Gubica, Milošević (CRO) |
| 15 October 2009; 19:00 | Tóth 10 | (13–9) | Tomečková 4 | Messzi István Sportcsarnok, Kecskemét; Attendance: 1,800; Referees: Gubica, Milošević (CRO) |
| 15 October 2009; 19:00 | 3× (yellow card) 2× (suspension) | Report | 2× (yellow card) 2× (suspension) | Messzi István Sportcsarnok, Kecskemét; Attendance: 1,800; Referees: Gubica, Milošević (CRO) |

| 15 October 2009; 19:00 | Sweden | 31–11 | Azerbaijan | Arena Skövde, Skövde; Attendance: 1,400; Referees: Čerņavskis, Bogdanovs (LAT) |
| 15 October 2009; 19:00 | Jacobsen, Torstensson 6 | (13–6) | Gorodtsova 5 | Arena Skövde, Skövde; Attendance: 1,400; Referees: Čerņavskis, Bogdanovs (LAT) |
| 15 October 2009; 19:00 | 3× (yellow card) 3× (suspension) | Report | 2× (yellow card) 3× (suspension) 1× (red card) | Arena Skövde, Skövde; Attendance: 1,400; Referees: Čerņavskis, Bogdanovs (LAT) |

| 18 October 2009; 15:30 | Czech Republic | 21–28 | Sweden | Hala Zubří o.p.s., Zubří; Attendance: 1,000; Referees: Mishchuk, Rozhkov (UKR) |
| 18 October 2009; 15:30 | Zamorska 6 | (9–12) | Ahlm 7 | Hala Zubří o.p.s., Zubří; Attendance: 1,000; Referees: Mishchuk, Rozhkov (UKR) |
| 18 October 2009; 15:30 | 2× (yellow card) 3× (suspension) | Report | 3× (yellow card) 3× (suspension) | Hala Zubří o.p.s., Zubří; Attendance: 1,000; Referees: Mishchuk, Rozhkov (UKR) |

| 18 October 2009; 17:00 | Azerbaijan | 15–31 | Hungary | ABU Arena, Baku; Attendance: 900; Referees: Mažeika, Gatelis (LTU) |
| 18 October 2009; 17:00 | Deryabina 8 | (6–16) | Szucsánszki 6 | ABU Arena, Baku; Attendance: 900; Referees: Mažeika, Gatelis (LTU) |
| 18 October 2009; 17:00 | 3× (yellow card) 2× (suspension) | Report | 2× (yellow card) 2× (suspension) | ABU Arena, Baku; Attendance: 900; Referees: Mažeika, Gatelis (LTU) |

| 31 March 2010; 17:00 | Azerbaijan | 19–26 | Czech Republic | ABU Arena, Baku; Attendance: 600; Referees: Katsikis, Michailidis (GRE) |
| 31 March 2010; 17:00 | Peche 5 | (8–10) | Černá, Zamorska 5 | ABU Arena, Baku; Attendance: 600; Referees: Katsikis, Michailidis (GRE) |
| 31 March 2010; 17:00 | 3× (yellow card) 5× (suspension) | Report | 4× (yellow card) 1× (suspension) | ABU Arena, Baku; Attendance: 600; Referees: Katsikis, Michailidis (GRE) |

| 1 April 2010; 19:15 | Sweden | 26–27 | Hungary | Sparbanken Skåne Arena, Lund; Attendance: 1,600; Referees: Stark, Ştefan (ROU) |
| 1 April 2010; 19:15 | Torstensson 10 | (12–15) | Tóth 9 | Sparbanken Skåne Arena, Lund; Attendance: 1,600; Referees: Stark, Ştefan (ROU) |
| 1 April 2010; 19:15 | 4× (yellow card) 4× (suspension) | Report | 3× (yellow card) 4× (suspension) | Sparbanken Skåne Arena, Lund; Attendance: 1,600; Referees: Stark, Ştefan (ROU) |

| 4 April 2010; 12:35 | Hungary | 26–24 | Sweden | Városi Sportcsarnok, Békéscsaba; Attendance: 2,200; Referees: Pandžić, Mošorinski (SRB) |
| 4 April 2010; 12:35 | Tóth 7 | (16–10) | Torstensson 8 | Városi Sportcsarnok, Békéscsaba; Attendance: 2,200; Referees: Pandžić, Mošorinski (SRB) |
| 4 April 2010; 12:35 | 3× (yellow card) 2× (suspension) | Report | 4× (yellow card) 3× (suspension) | Városi Sportcsarnok, Békéscsaba; Attendance: 2,200; Referees: Pandžić, Mošorinski (SRB) |

| 4 April 2010; 14:45 | Czech Republic | 37–25 | Azerbaijan | Sportovní hala Vodova, Brno; Attendance: 600; Referees: Nikolovski, Kolevski (MKD) |
| 4 April 2010; 14:45 | Salčáková 8 | (19–11) | Tankaskaya 5 | Sportovní hala Vodova, Brno; Attendance: 600; Referees: Nikolovski, Kolevski (MKD) |
| 4 April 2010; 14:45 | 3× (yellow card) 5× (suspension) | Report | 4× (yellow card) 6× (suspension) | Sportovní hala Vodova, Brno; Attendance: 600; Referees: Nikolovski, Kolevski (MKD) |

| 26 May 2010; 17:00 | Azerbaijan | 18–27 | Sweden | ABU Arena, Baku; Attendance: 400; Referees: Markovska, Vutov (BUL) |
| 26 May 2010; 17:00 | Deryabina 5 | (9–14) | Torstensson 6 | ABU Arena, Baku; Attendance: 400; Referees: Markovska, Vutov (BUL) |
| 26 May 2010; 17:00 | 2× (yellow card) 3× (suspension) | Report | 3× (yellow card) | ABU Arena, Baku; Attendance: 400; Referees: Markovska, Vutov (BUL) |

| 26 May 2010; 18:00 | Czech Republic | 23–31 | Hungary | Městská sportovní hala, Plzeň; Attendance: 600; Referees: Brehmer, Skowronek (POL) |
| 26 May 2010; 18:00 | Zamorska 6 | (13–17) | Görbicz 6 | Městská sportovní hala, Plzeň; Attendance: 600; Referees: Brehmer, Skowronek (POL) |
| 26 May 2010; 18:00 | 3× (yellow card) 4× (suspension) | Report | 3× (yellow card) 5× (suspension) | Městská sportovní hala, Plzeň; Attendance: 600; Referees: Brehmer, Skowronek (POL) |

| 30 May 2010; 11:40 | Hungary | 35–26 | Azerbaijan | Nyíregyháza; Attendance: 1,500; Referees: Mitrunen, Sundell (FIN) |
| 30 May 2010; 11:40 | Szucsánszki 5 | (19–12) | Tankaskaya 7 | Nyíregyháza; Attendance: 1,500; Referees: Mitrunen, Sundell (FIN) |
| 30 May 2010; 11:40 | 3× (yellow card) 1× (suspension) | Report | 3× (yellow card) 7× (suspension) | Nyíregyháza; Attendance: 1,500; Referees: Mitrunen, Sundell (FIN) |

| 30 May 2010; 17:30 | Sweden | 31–25 | Czech Republic | Arena Skövde, Skövde; Attendance: 1,500; Referees: Repenšek, Požežnik (SLO) |
| 30 May 2010; 17:30 | Torstensson 6 | (17–10) | Zamorska 6 | Arena Skövde, Skövde; Attendance: 1,500; Referees: Repenšek, Požežnik (SLO) |
| 30 May 2010; 17:30 | 3× (yellow card) 8× (suspension) | Report | 3× (yellow card) 3× (suspension) | Arena Skövde, Skövde; Attendance: 1,500; Referees: Repenšek, Požežnik (SLO) |
