= 2010 European Women's Handball Championship qualification – Group 5 =

== Group 5 Qualifiers and Results ==
Pos	Team	Pld	W	D	L	GF	GA	GD	Pts	Qualification	ESP	SRB	TUR	GRE
1	Spain	6	6	0	0	181	128	+53	12	Final tournament	—	29–25	30–26	39–16
2	Serbia	6	4	0	2	179	142	+37	8	Final tournament	20–21	—	28–27	45–18
3	Turkey	6	2	0	4	167	156	+11	4		27–30	30–32	—	30–22
4	Greece	6	0	0	6	101	202	−101	0		14–32	17–29	14–27	—

Source: EHF

All times are local

14 October 2009; 18:00	Serbia	45–18	Greece	Sportska Dvorana, Zrenjanin; Attendance: 1,500; Referees: Bonifert, Oláh (HUN)
14 October 2009; 18:00	five players 6	(25–10)	Fotiadou 6	Sportska Dvorana, Zrenjanin; Attendance: 1,500; Referees: Bonifert, Oláh (HUN)
14 October 2009; 18:00	2× (yellow card) 2× (suspension)	Report	2× (yellow card) 7× (suspension)	Sportska Dvorana, Zrenjanin; Attendance: 1,500; Referees: Bonifert, Oláh (HUN)

14 October 2009; 19:00	Spain	30–26	Turkey	Palacio de Deportes, Santander; Attendance: 2,500; Referees: Nielsen, Lorentzen (DEN)
14 October 2009; 19:00	Fernández 8	(16–15)	Özel 9	Palacio de Deportes, Santander; Attendance: 2,500; Referees: Nielsen, Lorentzen (DEN)
14 October 2009; 19:00	3× (yellow card) 3× (suspension)	Report	3× (yellow card) 5× (suspension)	Palacio de Deportes, Santander; Attendance: 2,500; Referees: Nielsen, Lorentzen (DEN)

18 October 2009; 16:00	Greece	14–32	Spain	EAK Patras-D.Tofalos, Bozaitika Patras; Attendance: 600; Referees: Pandžić, Šatordžija (BIH)
18 October 2009; 16:00	Poimenidou 6	(8–13)	Mangué 7	EAK Patras-D.Tofalos, Bozaitika Patras; Attendance: 600; Referees: Pandžić, Šatordžija (BIH)
18 October 2009; 16:00	3× (yellow card) 9× (suspension) 1× (red card)	Report	3× (yellow card) 4× (suspension)	EAK Patras-D.Tofalos, Bozaitika Patras; Attendance: 600; Referees: Pandžić, Šatordžija (BIH)

18 October 2009; 17:00	Turkey	30–32	Serbia	Muratpaşa Kızıltoprak Spor ve Sergi Salonu, Antalya; Attendance: 900; Referees: Badura, Ondogrecula (SVK)
18 October 2009; 17:00	Özel 9	(14–17)	Cvijić 10	Muratpaşa Kızıltoprak Spor ve Sergi Salonu, Antalya; Attendance: 900; Referees: Badura, Ondogrecula (SVK)
18 October 2009; 17:00	3× (yellow card) 2× (suspension)	Report	2× (yellow card) 4× (suspension)	Muratpaşa Kızıltoprak Spor ve Sergi Salonu, Antalya; Attendance: 900; Referees: Badura, Ondogrecula (SVK)

31 March 2010; 15:30	Greece	14–27	Turkey	Mikras 3 - Spiti tou Handbol, Thessaloniki; Attendance: 400; Referees: Kouz, Zhoba (UKR)
31 March 2010; 15:30	Tsàkalou 6	(9–13)	Özel 7	Mikras 3 - Spiti tou Handbol, Thessaloniki; Attendance: 400; Referees: Kouz, Zhoba (UKR)
31 March 2010; 15:30	3× (yellow card) 6× (suspension) 1× (red card)	Report	3× (yellow card) 4× (suspension)	Mikras 3 - Spiti tou Handbol, Thessaloniki; Attendance: 400; Referees: Kouz, Zhoba (UKR)

31 March 2010; 18:00	Serbia	20–21	Spain	SRC Kraljevica, Zaječar; Attendance: 2,300; Referees: Mažeika, Gatelis (LTU)
31 March 2010; 18:00	Krpež Šlezak 5	(10–12)	Martín 8	SRC Kraljevica, Zaječar; Attendance: 2,300; Referees: Mažeika, Gatelis (LTU)
31 March 2010; 18:00	3× (yellow card) 3× (suspension)	Report	2× (yellow card) 2× (suspension)	SRC Kraljevica, Zaječar; Attendance: 2,300; Referees: Mažeika, Gatelis (LTU)

3 April 2010; 19:00	Turkey	30–22	Greece	Celal Atik Spor Salon, İzmir; Attendance: 1,200; Referees: Repenšek, Požežnik (SLO)
3 April 2010; 19:00	İskenderoğlu 8	(17–13)	Tsàkalou 8	Celal Atik Spor Salon, İzmir; Attendance: 1,200; Referees: Repenšek, Požežnik (SLO)
3 April 2010; 19:00	4× (yellow card) 4× (suspension)	Report	3× (yellow card) 4× (suspension)	Celal Atik Spor Salon, İzmir; Attendance: 1,200; Referees: Repenšek, Požežnik (SLO)

4 April 2010; 13:00	Spain	29–25	Serbia	Pab. M. Tierra Estella, Estella-Lizarra; Attendance: 2,000; Referees: Andersen, Sødal (NOR)
4 April 2010; 13:00	Mangué 7	(15–12)	Cvijić, Damnjanović 6	Pab. M. Tierra Estella, Estella-Lizarra; Attendance: 2,000; Referees: Andersen, Sødal (NOR)
4 April 2010; 13:00	2× (yellow card)	Report	3× (yellow card) 4× (suspension)	Pab. M. Tierra Estella, Estella-Lizarra; Attendance: 2,000; Referees: Andersen, Sødal (NOR)

26 May 2010; 11:00	Greece	17–29	Serbia	EAK Patras-D.Tofalos, Bozaitika Patras; Attendance: 300; Referees: Riga, Thomassen (BEL)
26 May 2010; 11:00	Logdanidou 4	(8–14)	Lekić 6	EAK Patras-D.Tofalos, Bozaitika Patras; Attendance: 300; Referees: Riga, Thomassen (BEL)
26 May 2010; 11:00	3× (yellow card) 4× (suspension)	Report	3× (yellow card) 4× (suspension)	EAK Patras-D.Tofalos, Bozaitika Patras; Attendance: 300; Referees: Riga, Thomassen (BEL)

27 May 2010; 19:00	Turkey	27–30	Spain	Mersin; Attendance: 700; Referees: Buy, Pichon (FRA)
27 May 2010; 19:00	İskenderoğlu 8	(14–12)	Alberto 9	Mersin; Attendance: 700; Referees: Buy, Pichon (FRA)
27 May 2010; 19:00	3× (yellow card) 8× (suspension) 1× (red card)	Report	3× (yellow card) 5× (suspension)	Mersin; Attendance: 700; Referees: Buy, Pichon (FRA)

30 May 2010; 11:00	Spain	39–16	Greece	Utebo, Zaragoza; Attendance: 1,100; Referees: Santos, Fonseca (POR)
30 May 2010; 11:00	Alonso Bernardo 7	(16–5)	Stratou 4	Utebo, Zaragoza; Attendance: 1,100; Referees: Santos, Fonseca (POR)
30 May 2010; 11:00	4× (yellow card) 1× (suspension)	Report	3× (yellow card) 5× (suspension)	Utebo, Zaragoza; Attendance: 1,100; Referees: Santos, Fonseca (POR)

30 May 2010; 20:00	Serbia	28–27	Turkey	Dvorana Smederevo, Smederevo; Attendance: 2,500; Referees: Håkansson, Nilsson (SWE)
30 May 2010; 20:00	Lekić 8	(15–15)	İskenderoğlu 8	Dvorana Smederevo, Smederevo; Attendance: 2,500; Referees: Håkansson, Nilsson (SWE)
30 May 2010; 20:00	4× (yellow card) 5× (suspension)	Report	4× (yellow card) 8× (suspension)	Dvorana Smederevo, Smederevo; Attendance: 2,500; Referees: Håkansson, Nilsson (SWE)
