= 2010 European Women's Handball Championship qualification – Group 3 =

== Group 3 Qualifiers and Results ==
Pos	Team	Pld	W	D	L	GF	GA	GD	Pts	Qualification	FRA	ISL	AUT	GBR
1	France	6	6	0	0	191	124	+67	12	Final tournament	—	32–23	29–22	34–15
2	Iceland	6	3	0	3	166	146	+20	6	Final tournament	24–27	—	29–25	40–20
3	Austria	6	3	0	3	150	145	+5	6		24–27	26–23	—	30–20
4	Great Britain	6	0	0	6	104	196	−92	0		16–42	16–27	17–23	—

Source: EHF

All times are local

14 October 2009; 19:30	France	32–23	Iceland	Palais des Sports, Besançon; Attendance: 3,000; Referees: Harabagiu, Stănescu (ROU)
14 October 2009; 19:30	Baudouin 7	(16–12)	Skúladóttir 6	Palais des Sports, Besançon; Attendance: 3,000; Referees: Harabagiu, Stănescu (ROU)
14 October 2009; 19:30	3× (yellow card) 4× (suspension) 1× (red card)	Report	3× (yellow card) 5× (suspension)	Palais des Sports, Besançon; Attendance: 3,000; Referees: Harabagiu, Stănescu (ROU)

14 October 2009; 20:00	Austria	30–20	Great Britain	Ballspielhalle Feldkirchen, Feldkirchen; Attendance: 500; Referees: Florescu, Duţă (ROU)
14 October 2009; 20:00	Aćimović, Engel 9	(18–12)	Goodwin 6	Ballspielhalle Feldkirchen, Feldkirchen; Attendance: 500; Referees: Florescu, Duţă (ROU)
14 October 2009; 20:00	1× (yellow card) 2× (suspension)	Report	3× (yellow card) 1× (suspension)	Ballspielhalle Feldkirchen, Feldkirchen; Attendance: 500; Referees: Florescu, Duţă (ROU)

17 October 2009; 16:00	Great Britain	16–42	France	Crystal Palace, London; Attendance: 700; Referees: Samuelsen, Hansen (FAR)
17 October 2009; 16:00	Goodwin 5	(9–18)	six players 5	Crystal Palace, London; Attendance: 700; Referees: Samuelsen, Hansen (FAR)
17 October 2009; 16:00	3× (yellow card) 5× (suspension) 1× (red card)	Report	2× (yellow card) 1× (suspension)	Crystal Palace, London; Attendance: 700; Referees: Samuelsen, Hansen (FAR)

18 October 2009; 16:00	Iceland	29–25	Austria	Hlíðarendi (stadium), Reykjavík; Attendance: 800; Referees: Arntsen, Gullaksen (NOR)
18 October 2009; 16:00	Eyjólfsdóttir 6	(19–10)	Aćimović 7	Hlíðarendi (stadium), Reykjavík; Attendance: 800; Referees: Arntsen, Gullaksen (NOR)
18 October 2009; 16:00	2× (yellow card) 5× (suspension) 1× (red card)	Report	2× (yellow card) 1× (suspension)	Hlíðarendi (stadium), Reykjavík; Attendance: 800; Referees: Arntsen, Gullaksen (NOR)

31 March 2010; 19:00	Great Britain	16–27	Iceland	Crystal Palace, London; Attendance: 500; Referees: Evers, Kums (BEL)
31 March 2010; 19:00	Fairbrother 5	(7–15)	Stefánsdóttir 14	Crystal Palace, London; Attendance: 500; Referees: Evers, Kums (BEL)
31 March 2010; 19:00	3× (yellow card) 4× (suspension)	Report	2× (yellow card) 3× (suspension)	Crystal Palace, London; Attendance: 500; Referees: Evers, Kums (BEL)

31 March 2010; 20:22	Austria	24–27	France	Sporthalle Margareten, Vienna; Referees: Mishchuk, Rozhkov (UKR)
31 March 2010; 20:22	Aćimović 8	(14–12)	Piejos 8	Sporthalle Margareten, Vienna; Referees: Mishchuk, Rozhkov (UKR)
31 March 2010; 20:22	3× (yellow card) 1× (suspension)	Report	3× (yellow card) 4× (suspension) 1× (red card)	Sporthalle Margareten, Vienna; Referees: Mishchuk, Rozhkov (UKR)

3 April 2010; 14:00	Iceland	40–20	Great Britain	Laugardalshöll, Reykjavík; Attendance: 300; Referees: Brehmer, Skowronek (POL)
3 April 2010; 14:00	Stefánsdóttir 17	(23–9)	Gerbron 5	Laugardalshöll, Reykjavík; Attendance: 300; Referees: Brehmer, Skowronek (POL)
3 April 2010; 14:00	2× (yellow card) 5× (suspension)	Report	3× (yellow card) 5× (suspension)	Laugardalshöll, Reykjavík; Attendance: 300; Referees: Brehmer, Skowronek (POL)

4 April 2010; 16:45	France	29–22	Austria	Palais des Sports de Pau, Pau; Attendance: 5,500; Referees: Mitrunen, Sundell (FIN)
4 April 2010; 16:45	Ayglon, Piejos 5	(16–9)	Engel 12	Palais des Sports de Pau, Pau; Attendance: 5,500; Referees: Mitrunen, Sundell (FIN)
4 April 2010; 16:45	3× (yellow card) 2× (suspension)	Report	3× (yellow card) 1× (suspension)	Palais des Sports de Pau, Pau; Attendance: 5,500; Referees: Mitrunen, Sundell (FIN)

26 May 2010; 19:00	Great Britain	17–23	Austria	Kelvin Hall International Sports Arena, Glasgow; Attendance: 500; Referees: Bonifert, Oláh (HUN)
26 May 2010; 19:00	Byl 4	(8–10)	Engel, Plach 6	Kelvin Hall International Sports Arena, Glasgow; Attendance: 500; Referees: Bonifert, Oláh (HUN)
26 May 2010; 19:00	3× (yellow card) 3× (suspension)	Report	3× (yellow card) 3× (suspension)	Kelvin Hall International Sports Arena, Glasgow; Attendance: 500; Referees: Bonifert, Oláh (HUN)

26 May 2010; 20:15	Iceland	24–27	France	Laugardalshöll, Reykjavík; Referees: Stenrand, Kærlund Birch (DEN)
26 May 2010; 20:15	Stefánsdóttir 13	(11–13)	Herbrecht 5	Laugardalshöll, Reykjavík; Referees: Stenrand, Kærlund Birch (DEN)
26 May 2010; 20:15	3× (yellow card) 2× (suspension)	Report	4× (yellow card) 2× (suspension) 1× (red card)	Laugardalshöll, Reykjavík; Referees: Stenrand, Kærlund Birch (DEN)

29 May 2010; 20:22	Austria	26–23	Iceland	Sportzentrum Alte Au, Stockerau; Attendance: 900; Referees: Sivak, Dvorsky (SVK)
29 May 2010; 20:22	Aćimović 11	(12–12)	Skúladóttir 8	Sportzentrum Alte Au, Stockerau; Attendance: 900; Referees: Sivak, Dvorsky (SVK)
29 May 2010; 20:22	3× (yellow card) 3× (suspension)	Report	4× (yellow card) 7× (suspension) 1× (red card)	Sportzentrum Alte Au, Stockerau; Attendance: 900; Referees: Sivak, Dvorsky (SVK)

30 May 2010; 15:00	France	34–15	Great Britain	Palais Saint Sauveur, Lille; Attendance: 1,300; Referees: Christidi, Papamattheou (GRE)
30 May 2010; 15:00	Ayglon, Herbrecht 6	(16–8)	Lam-Moores, Palies 4	Palais Saint Sauveur, Lille; Attendance: 1,300; Referees: Christidi, Papamattheou (GRE)
30 May 2010; 15:00	1× (yellow card)	Report	3× (yellow card) 2× (suspension)	Palais Saint Sauveur, Lille; Attendance: 1,300; Referees: Christidi, Papamattheou (GRE)
