= 2010 European Women's Handball Championship qualification – Group 6 =

== Group 6 Qualifiers and Results ==
Pos	Team	Pld	W	D	L	GF	GA	GD	Pts	Qualification	MNE	RUS	SVK	POL
1	Montenegro	6	5	1	0	196	160	+36	11	Final tournament	—	28–28	39–24	35–32
2	Russia	6	4	1	1	196	155	+41	9	Final tournament	28–31	—	33–26	35–20
3	Slovakia	6	1	0	5	156	193	−37	2		27–32	24–37	—	32–28
4	Poland	6	1	0	5	151	191	−40	2		21–31	26–35	24–23	—

Source: EHF

All times are local

14 October 2009; 17:00	Russia	33–26	Slovakia	Olimpiyskiy-Chekhov, Chekhov; Attendance: 1,000; Referees: Chaskis, Tsakonas (GRE)
14 October 2009; 17:00	Levina 6	(16–14)	Dubajová 8	Olimpiyskiy-Chekhov, Chekhov; Attendance: 1,000; Referees: Chaskis, Tsakonas (GRE)
14 October 2009; 17:00	3× (yellow card) 4× (suspension)	Report	4× (yellow card) 4× (suspension)	Olimpiyskiy-Chekhov, Chekhov; Attendance: 1,000; Referees: Chaskis, Tsakonas (GRE)

14 October 2009; 18:00	Poland	21–31	Montenegro	Globus Hall, Lublin; Attendance: 1,800; Referees: Stenrand, Kærlund Birch (DEN)
14 October 2009; 18:00	Dworaczyk, Kudłacz 4	(10–14)	Savić 7	Globus Hall, Lublin; Attendance: 1,800; Referees: Stenrand, Kærlund Birch (DEN)
14 October 2009; 18:00	2× (yellow card) 3× (suspension) 1× (red card)	Report	3× (yellow card) 3× (suspension)	Globus Hall, Lublin; Attendance: 1,800; Referees: Stenrand, Kærlund Birch (DEN)

17 October 2009; 17:30	Montenegro	28–28	Russia	Morača Sports Center, Podgorica; Attendance: 4,000; Referees: Canbro, Claesson (SWE)
17 October 2009; 17:30	Popović 10	(19–16)	Levina 9	Morača Sports Center, Podgorica; Attendance: 4,000; Referees: Canbro, Claesson (SWE)
17 October 2009; 17:30	2× (yellow card) 2× (suspension)	Report	2× (yellow card) 4× (suspension)	Morača Sports Center, Podgorica; Attendance: 4,000; Referees: Canbro, Claesson (SWE)

18 October 2009; 11:00	Slovakia	32–28	Poland	Športová Hala, Hlohovec; Attendance: 1,200; Referees: Jurinović, Mrvica (CRO)
18 October 2009; 11:00	Jakubisová 6	(16–14)	Kudłacz 6	Športová Hala, Hlohovec; Attendance: 1,200; Referees: Jurinović, Mrvica (CRO)
18 October 2009; 11:00	2× (yellow card) 3× (suspension)	Report	2× (yellow card) 3× (suspension)	Športová Hala, Hlohovec; Attendance: 1,200; Referees: Jurinović, Mrvica (CRO)

31 March 2010; 18:00	Poland	26–35	Russia	Hala MOSiR, Chorzów; Attendance: 1,200; Referees: Aliyev, Aghakishiyev (AZE)
31 March 2010; 18:00	Polenz 7	(15–15)	Kochetova 15	Hala MOSiR, Chorzów; Attendance: 1,200; Referees: Aliyev, Aghakishiyev (AZE)
31 March 2010; 18:00	3× (yellow card) 3× (suspension)	Report	3× (yellow card) 2× (suspension)	Hala MOSiR, Chorzów; Attendance: 1,200; Referees: Aliyev, Aghakishiyev (AZE)

31 March 2010; 20:00	Montenegro	39–24	Slovakia	Sportski Centar Ada, Pljevlja; Attendance: 2,500; Referees: Cohen, Peretz (ISR)
31 March 2010; 20:00	Radičević 10	(18–12)	Glankovicova 7	Sportski Centar Ada, Pljevlja; Attendance: 2,500; Referees: Cohen, Peretz (ISR)
31 March 2010; 20:00	4× (yellow card) 4× (suspension)	Report	3× (yellow card) 1× (suspension)	Sportski Centar Ada, Pljevlja; Attendance: 2,500; Referees: Cohen, Peretz (ISR)

4 April 2010; 11:00	Slovakia	27–32	Montenegro	Športová Hala, Hlohovec; Attendance: 500; Referees: C. Kékes, P. Kékes (HUN)
4 April 2010; 11:00	hrabovská 7	(11–17)	Radičević 13	Športová Hala, Hlohovec; Attendance: 500; Referees: C. Kékes, P. Kékes (HUN)
4 April 2010; 11:00	3× (yellow card)	Report	3× (yellow card) 4× (suspension)	Športová Hala, Hlohovec; Attendance: 500; Referees: C. Kékes, P. Kékes (HUN)

4 April 2010; 17:00	Russia	35–20	Poland	Olimpiyskiy-Chekhov, Chekhov; Attendance: 1,000; Referees: Erdoğan, Özdeniz (TUR)
4 April 2010; 17:00	Khmyrova 7	(17–11)	four players 3	Olimpiyskiy-Chekhov, Chekhov; Attendance: 1,000; Referees: Erdoğan, Özdeniz (TUR)
4 April 2010; 17:00	3× (yellow card) 1× (suspension)	Report	3× (yellow card)	Olimpiyskiy-Chekhov, Chekhov; Attendance: 1,000; Referees: Erdoğan, Özdeniz (TUR)

26 May 2010; 18:00	Slovakia	24–37	Russia	Športová Hala, Hlohovec; Attendance: 1,000; Referees: Johansson, Kliko (SWE)
26 May 2010; 18:00	Pajtasova 6	(10–17)	Kochetova 7	Športová Hala, Hlohovec; Attendance: 1,000; Referees: Johansson, Kliko (SWE)
26 May 2010; 18:00	3× (yellow card) 2× (suspension)	Report	3× (yellow card) 2× (suspension)	Športová Hala, Hlohovec; Attendance: 1,000; Referees: Johansson, Kliko (SWE)

26 May 2010; 20:00	Montenegro	35–32	Poland	Sportski Centar Ada, Pljevlja; Referees: Mishchuk, Rozhkov (UKR)
26 May 2010; 20:00	Radičević 9	(17–15)	Gleń, Stachowska 5	Sportski Centar Ada, Pljevlja; Referees: Mishchuk, Rozhkov (UKR)
26 May 2010; 20:00	3× (yellow card) 5× (suspension)	Report	3× (yellow card) 2× (suspension)	Sportski Centar Ada, Pljevlja; Referees: Mishchuk, Rozhkov (UKR)

30 May 2010; 17:00	Russia	28–31	Montenegro	Olimpiyskiy-Chekhov, Chekhov; Attendance: 500; Referees: Hansen, Pettersen (NOR)
30 May 2010; 17:00	Kochetova 12	(13–16)	Popović, Radičević 7	Olimpiyskiy-Chekhov, Chekhov; Attendance: 500; Referees: Hansen, Pettersen (NOR)
30 May 2010; 17:00	3× (yellow card) 4× (suspension)	Report	4× (yellow card) 3× (suspension)	Olimpiyskiy-Chekhov, Chekhov; Attendance: 500; Referees: Hansen, Pettersen (NOR)

30 May 2010; 17:30	Poland	24–23	Slovakia	Hala Sportowa RELAX, Piotrków Trybunalski; Attendance: 700; Referees: Rutkovskis, Dzērve (LAT)
30 May 2010; 17:30	three players 4	(11–13)	Jakubisová 8	Hala Sportowa RELAX, Piotrków Trybunalski; Attendance: 700; Referees: Rutkovskis, Dzērve (LAT)
30 May 2010; 17:30	3× (yellow card) 2× (suspension)	Report	3× (yellow card) 1× (suspension)	Hala Sportowa RELAX, Piotrków Trybunalski; Attendance: 700; Referees: Rutkovskis, Dzērve (LAT)
