= Maibritt Kviesgaard =

Danish handball player (born 1986)

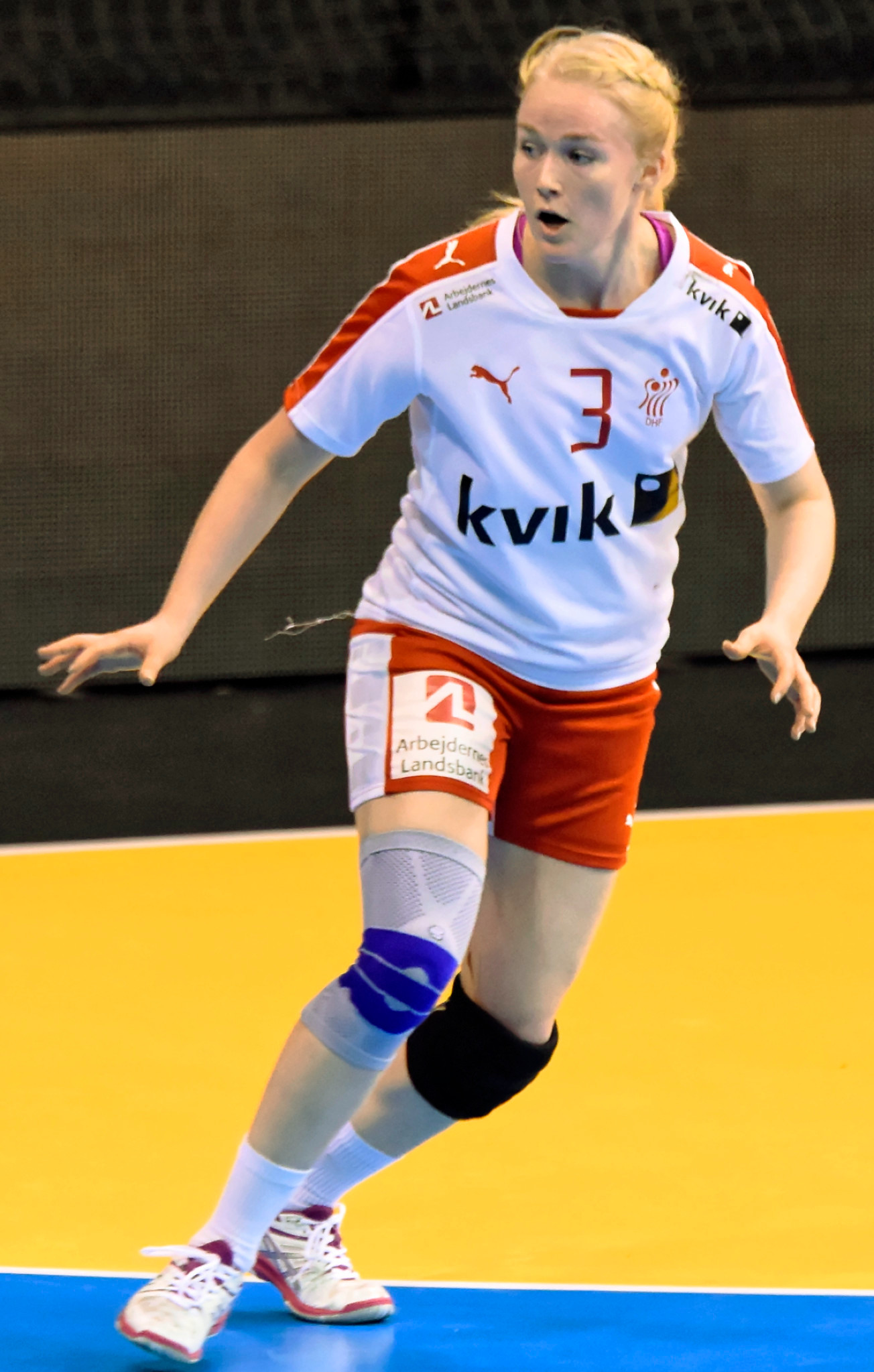

Personal information
- Nationality: Danish
- Born: 15 May 1986 (age 40) Aarhus, Denmark
- Height: 1.72 m (5 ft 8 in)

Sport
- Sport: Handball
- Position: Right wing

Senior clubs
- Years: Team
- 2005–2006: KIF Vejen
- 2006–2009: GOG Svendborg TGI
- 2009–2011: SK Aarhus
- 2011–2013: FC Midtjylland
- 2013–2018: Team Esbjerg
National team
Years	Team	Apps	(Gls)
2006–2015	Denmark	105	(220)
Medal record
World Championship
Bronze medal – third place	2013 Serbia	Team

Maibritt Kviesgaard (born 15 May 1986) is a Danish former handball player. She has also played on the Danish national team.

She competed at the 2010 European Women's Handball Championship, where the Danish team placed fourth, and Kviesgaard was voted into the All-Star Team as Best Right Wing.

== Career ==
She started playing senior handball at KIF Vejen. A year later he switched to league rivals GOG Svendborg TGI. Just after joining GOG, she debuted for the Danish national team on 1 August 2006 in a match against Sweden.

In 2009 she switched to SK Aarhus on a three-year deal.

In 2011 she joined FC Midtjylland Håndbold.

In December 2011 she got a cruciate ligament injury during a national team game, which kept her out for the rest of the season. 15 months later she would make her comeback for FCM. In 2013 she won the Danish Championship with FCM Håndbold.

The season after she switched to Team Esbjerg. Here she won the Danish Championship for a second time in 2016, which was the first in club history. She retired in 2018, but returned to handball to play as an amateur at the third-tier side Kolding HK.

At the 2013 World Championship, she was a part of the Danish team that won bronze medals, breaking a 9-year streak without medals for the Danish team. They beat Poland 30–26.
