= 2010 European Women's Handball Championship qualification – Group 7 =

== Group 7 ==
Pos	Team	Pld	W	D	L	GF	GA	GD	Pts	Qualification	CRO	NED	MKD	LTU
1	Croatia	6	5	0	1	191	138	+53	10	Final tournament	—	32–23	36–23	31–22
2	Netherlands	6	3	2	1	161	146	+15	8	Final tournament	25–24	—	20–20	34–20
3	Macedonia	6	2	2	2	157	153	+4	6		21–26	28–28	—	32–24
4	Lithuania	6	0	0	6	131	203	−72	0		24–42	22–31	19–33	—

Source: EHF

All times are local

14 October 2009; 20:30	Macedonia	32–24	Lithuania	SRC Kale, Skopje; Attendance: 1,600; Referees: I. Covalciuc, A. Covalciuc (MDA)
14 October 2009; 20:30	Crvenkoska, Gjeorgjievska 6	(17–10)	Stellbrink 6	SRC Kale, Skopje; Attendance: 1,600; Referees: I. Covalciuc, A. Covalciuc (MDA)
14 October 2009; 20:30	2× (yellow card) 5× (suspension)	Report	3× (yellow card) 3× (suspension) 1× (red card)	SRC Kale, Skopje; Attendance: 1,600; Referees: I. Covalciuc, A. Covalciuc (MDA)

15 October 2009; 18:00	Croatia	32–23	Netherlands	Dvorana Mladosti, Rijeka; Attendance: 1,500; Referees: Stoļarovs, Līcis (LAT)
15 October 2009; 18:00	Penezić 7	(19–11)	van Dort 6	Dvorana Mladosti, Rijeka; Attendance: 1,500; Referees: Stoļarovs, Līcis (LAT)
15 October 2009; 18:00	3× (yellow card) 4× (suspension)	Report	3× (yellow card) 2× (suspension)	Dvorana Mladosti, Rijeka; Attendance: 1,500; Referees: Stoļarovs, Līcis (LAT)

18 October 2009; 15:00	Netherlands	20–20	Macedonia	Topsportcentrum Rotterdam, Rotterdam; Attendance: 1,800; Referees: Leandersson, Lindroos (FIN)
18 October 2009; 15:00	Lamein 7	(15–8)	Crvenkoska 9	Topsportcentrum Rotterdam, Rotterdam; Attendance: 1,800; Referees: Leandersson, Lindroos (FIN)
18 October 2009; 15:00	3× (yellow card) 5× (suspension) 1× (red card)	Report	3× (yellow card) 3× (suspension)	Topsportcentrum Rotterdam, Rotterdam; Attendance: 1,800; Referees: Leandersson, Lindroos (FIN)

18 October 2009; 20:00	Lithuania	24–42	Croatia	VSI Rankinio Centras, Panevėžys; Attendance: 300; Referees: Guseva, Vartanyan (RUS)
18 October 2009; 20:00	Stellbrink 8	(13–20)	Golubić 12	VSI Rankinio Centras, Panevėžys; Attendance: 300; Referees: Guseva, Vartanyan (RUS)
18 October 2009; 20:00	3× (yellow card) 3× (suspension)	Report	3× (yellow card) 3× (suspension)	VSI Rankinio Centras, Panevėžys; Attendance: 300; Referees: Guseva, Vartanyan (RUS)

31 March 2010; 18:00	Macedonia	21–26	Croatia	SRC Kale, Skopje; Attendance: 1,700; Referees: Veber, Pangerc (SLO)
31 March 2010; 18:00	Gjeorgjievska, Kresoja 5	(12–13)	Peraica 5	SRC Kale, Skopje; Attendance: 1,700; Referees: Veber, Pangerc (SLO)
31 March 2010; 18:00	3× (yellow card) 4× (suspension)	Report	3× (yellow card) 5× (suspension)	SRC Kale, Skopje; Attendance: 1,700; Referees: Veber, Pangerc (SLO)

31 March 2010; 19:00	Lithuania	22–31	Netherlands	S.Dariaus ir S.Girėno sporto halė, Kaunas; Attendance: 700; Referees: Hajek, Macho (CZE)
31 March 2010; 19:00	Stellbrink 10	(12–15)	Visser 8	S.Dariaus ir S.Girėno sporto halė, Kaunas; Attendance: 700; Referees: Hajek, Macho (CZE)
31 March 2010; 19:00	3× (yellow card) 4× (suspension)	Report	2× (yellow card) 6× (suspension)	S.Dariaus ir S.Girėno sporto halė, Kaunas; Attendance: 700; Referees: Hajek, Macho (CZE)

3 April 2010; 18:00	Croatia	36–23	Macedonia	Graditeljska škola, Čakovec; Attendance: 1,500; Referees: Pandžić, Šatordžija (BIH)
3 April 2010; 18:00	Pušić 6	(18–10)	Oholanga 7	Graditeljska škola, Čakovec; Attendance: 1,500; Referees: Pandžić, Šatordžija (BIH)
3 April 2010; 18:00	3× (yellow card) 5× (suspension)	Report	3× (yellow card) 3× (suspension)	Graditeljska škola, Čakovec; Attendance: 1,500; Referees: Pandžić, Šatordžija (BIH)

4 April 2010; 14:00	Netherlands	34–20	Lithuania	Topsportcentrum Almere, Almere; Attendance: 1,600; Referees: Sirbu, Suponicov (MDA)
4 April 2010; 14:00	Visser 7	(17–9)	Bartaševičienė 7	Topsportcentrum Almere, Almere; Attendance: 1,600; Referees: Sirbu, Suponicov (MDA)
4 April 2010; 14:00	2× (yellow card) 8× (suspension)	Report	3× (yellow card) 2× (suspension)	Topsportcentrum Almere, Almere; Attendance: 1,600; Referees: Sirbu, Suponicov (MDA)

26 May 2010; 19:00	Lithuania	19–33	Macedonia	S.Dariaus ir S.Girėno sporto halė, Kaunas; Attendance: 300; Referees: Aliyev, Aghakishiyev (AZE)
26 May 2010; 19:00	Jurgutytė 5	(9–18)	Pecevska 7	S.Dariaus ir S.Girėno sporto halė, Kaunas; Attendance: 300; Referees: Aliyev, Aghakishiyev (AZE)
26 May 2010; 19:00	3× (yellow card) 1× (suspension)	Report	3× (yellow card) 4× (suspension)	S.Dariaus ir S.Girėno sporto halė, Kaunas; Attendance: 300; Referees: Aliyev, Aghakishiyev (AZE)

26 May 2010; 20:00	Netherlands	25–24	Croatia	Topsportcentrum Rotterdam, Rotterdam; Attendance: 900; Referees: Kouz, Zhoba (UKR)
26 May 2010; 20:00	Groot 6	(9–14)	Arslanagić 6	Topsportcentrum Rotterdam, Rotterdam; Attendance: 900; Referees: Kouz, Zhoba (UKR)
26 May 2010; 20:00	3× (yellow card) 5× (suspension) 1× (red card)	Report	3× (yellow card) 3× (suspension)	Topsportcentrum Rotterdam, Rotterdam; Attendance: 900; Referees: Kouz, Zhoba (UKR)

29 May 2010; 14:15	Croatia	31–22	Lithuania	Beli Manastir; Attendance: 1,100; Referees: Hintenaus, Schneider (AUT)
29 May 2010; 14:15	Peraica 9	(15–6)	Vyšniauskaitė 4	Beli Manastir; Attendance: 1,100; Referees: Hintenaus, Schneider (AUT)
29 May 2010; 14:15	3× (yellow card) 1× (suspension)	Report	3× (yellow card) 3× (suspension)	Beli Manastir; Attendance: 1,100; Referees: Hintenaus, Schneider (AUT)

30 May 2010; 17:50	Macedonia	28–28	Netherlands	SRC Kale, Skopje; Attendance: 1,700; Referees: Nybo, Poulsen (DEN)
30 May 2010; 17:50	Portjanko 9	(12–14)	van der Heijden 6	SRC Kale, Skopje; Attendance: 1,700; Referees: Nybo, Poulsen (DEN)
30 May 2010; 17:50	4× (yellow card) 1× (suspension)	Report	4× (yellow card) 5× (suspension)	SRC Kale, Skopje; Attendance: 1,700; Referees: Nybo, Poulsen (DEN)
