= 2010 European Women's Handball Championship =

2010 EHF European Women's Handball Championship

Tournament details
- Host countries: Denmark; Norway
- Venues: 5 (in 5 host cities)
- Dates: 7–19 December
- Teams: 16 (from 1 confederation)

Final positions
- Champions: Norway (5th title)
- Runners-up: Sweden
- Third place: Romania
- Fourth place: Denmark

Tournament statistics
- Matches played: 47
- Goals scored: 2,388 (50.81 per match)
- Attendance: 215,752 (4,590 per match)
- Top scorers: Cristina Neagu (ROU) (53 goals)

Awards
- Best player: Linnea Torstensson (SWE)

The 2010 European Women's Handball Championship was held in Denmark and Norway from 7 to 19 December. It was the first European Championship hosted by two countries. Norway won their overall 5th gold medal and 4th in a row, when they defeated first time finalist Sweden in the final. Romania claimed the bronze medal.

== Venues ==
Three Danish and two Norwegian cities have been selected to host the 2010 Championship. The venues in Aalborg, Aarhus and Larvik were only used during the preliminary round. The fourth venue to be used in this round is located in Lillehammer, and was also one of the two venues in the main round. The other being MCH Indoor Arena in Herning, which was the only venue to be used in the final round.

Lillehammer
Håkons Hall; Capacity: 11,500
Larvik	Map	Aalborg
Arena Larvik; Capacity: 4,000	2010 European Women's Handball Championship is located in Southwest Scandinavia	Gigantium; Capacity: 7,600
Herning	2010 European Women's Handball Championship is located in Southwest Scandinavia	Aarhus
Jyske Bank Boxen; Capacity: 12,000	2010 European Women's Handball Championship is located in Southwest Scandinavia	NRGi Arena; Capacity: 4,740

== Competition format ==
- Preliminary round: 16 teams were divided into four groups. They played each other in a single round robin system, so each team played three matches. A win was worth two points, while a draw was worth one point. The top three teams from each group advanced to the main round.
- Main round: 12 teams were divided in two groups. They played against the teams they didn't play in the preliminary round, so each team played 3 matches. All points from the preliminary round, except the points gained against the 4th place team in the preliminary group, were carried forward into the main round. Same round robin rules applied as in the preliminary round. Top 2 teams from each group advanced to the Semifinals, while the third placed team from each group advanced to the 5th–6th Place Play-off.
- Final round: 6 teams play in the final weekend of the championships. 3rd place teams from the main round played in the 5th–6th Place Play-off. Other teams played in the Semi-finals. Losers of the Semi-finals advanced to the 3rd–4th Place Play-off, and winners advanced to the Final.

=== Ranking in preliminary and main round ===
If two or more teams were equal on points in the preliminary or main round, their ranking was determined as follows:

During the preliminary or main round matches:

1. higher goal difference in all matches
2. greater number of plus goals in all matches
3. alphabetic order

After the completion of the preliminary and main round matches:

1. better results in points gained in the direct encounter of the teams
2. higher goal difference in the direct encounter of the teams
3. greater number of plus goals in the direct encounter of the teams
4. goal difference in all matches (achieved by subtraction)
5. greater number of plus goals in all matches

== Qualification ==
Qualification matches were played from September 2009 to May 2010. Following the new system introduced for the 2010 Men's Championship, all teams were included in the qualification round, except host Denmark and defending champion and host Norway. Teams were divided in 7 groups and the two top ranked teams from each group qualified.

=== Qualified teams ===
Country	Qualified as	Date qualification was secured	Previous appearances in tournament^{1}
Denmark	Co-hosts	5 May 2006	8 (**1994**, **1996**, 1998, 2000, **2002**, 2004, 2006, 2008)
Norway	Co-hosts	5 May 2006	8 (1994, 1996, **1998**, 2000, 2002, **2004**, **2006**, **2008**)
Hungary	Group 2 winner	4 April 2010	8 (1994, 1996, 1998, **2000**, 2002, 2004, 2006, 2008)
France	Group 3 winner	4 April 2010	5 (2000, 2002, 2004, 2006, 2008)
Germany	Group 4 winner	4 April 2010	8 (1994, 1996, 1998, 2000, 2002, 2004, 2006, 2008)
Spain	Group 5 winner	4 April 2010	5 (1998, 2002, 2004, 2006, 2008)
Montenegro	Group 6 winner	4 April 2010	0 (debut)
Russia	2nd place in Group 6	4 April 2010	8 (1994, 1996, 1998, 2000, 2002, 2004, 2006, 2008)
Croatia	Group 7 winner	4 April 2010	5 (1994, 1996, 2004, 2006, 2008)
Romania	2nd place in Group 1	26 May 2010	7 (1994, 1996, 1998, 2000, 2002, 2004, 2008)
Ukraine	Group 1 winner	26 May 2010	8 (1994, 1996, 1998, 2000, 2002, 2004, 2006, 2008)
Iceland	2nd place in Group 3	29 May 2010	0 (debut)
Slovenia	2nd place in Group 4	30 May 2010	3 (2002, 2004, 2006)
Netherlands	2nd place in Group 7	30 May 2010	3 (1998, 2002, 2006)
Sweden	2nd place in Group 2	30 May 2010	6 (1994, 1996, 2002, 2004, 2006, 2008)
Serbia	2nd place in Group 5	30 May 2010	2 (2006, 2008)

^{1} Bold indicates champion for that year

== Squads ==
Each nation had to submit an initial squad of 28 players by 3 November 2010, but 12 of them became reserves when the final squad of 16 players was announced the day before the tournament starts.

== Referees ==
13 Referee pairs were selected:

- (Croatia) Matija Gubica and Boris Milošević
- (Czech Republic) Jiří Opava and Pavel Válek
- (Denmark) Martin Gjeding and Mads Hansen
- (Denmark) Marlene Kroløkke Lythje and Karina Christiansen
- (France) Charlotte Bonaventura and Julie Bonaventura
- (Hungary) Csaba Kékes and Pál Kékes
- (Israel) Slomo Cohen and Yoram Peretz
- (Latvia) Zigmārs Stoļarovs and Renārs Līcis
- (Montenegro) Ivan Pavićević and Miloš Ražnatović
- (Norway) Kjersti Arntsen and Ida Cecilie Gullaksen
- (Romania) Diana-Carmen Florescu and Anamaria Duţă
- (Russia) Valerija Guseva and Stella Vartanyan
- (Slovakia) Peter Brunovský and Vladimír Čanda

== Seeding ==
The draw for the final tournament took place 17:00 CET on 5 June 2010 in Odense.

Pot 1	Pot 2	Pot 3	Pot 4
Norway (assigned to D1); Spain; Montenegro; Germany (assigned to C1)	Hungary; Croatia; Denmark (assigned to A2); Ukraine	France; Russia (assigned to B3); Romania; Sweden	Serbia; Slovenia; Netherlands; Iceland

== Preliminary round ==
=== Group A (Aalborg) ===
Pos	Team	Pld	W	D	L	GF	GA	GD	Pts	Qualification
1	Denmark (H)	3	3	0	0	72	61	+11	6	Main round
2	Romania	3	2	0	1	92	79	+13	4	Main round
3	Spain	3	1	0	2	71	75	−4	2	Main round
4	Serbia	3	0	0	3	71	91	−20	0	

(H) Hosts

All times are Central European Time (UTC+1)

7 December; 18:15	Spain	26 – 30	Romania	Gigantium Arena, Aalborg; Attendance: 4,231; Referees: Arntsen, Gullaksen (NOR)
7 December; 18:15	Pena 6	(10–15)	Vărzaru 9	Gigantium Arena, Aalborg; Attendance: 4,231; Referees: Arntsen, Gullaksen (NOR)
7 December; 18:15	2× (yellow card) 3× (suspension)	Report	3× (yellow card) 3× (suspension)	Gigantium Arena, Aalborg; Attendance: 4,231; Referees: Arntsen, Gullaksen (NOR)

7 December; 20:45	Denmark	25 – 20	Serbia	Gigantium Arena, Aalborg; Attendance: 6,223; Referees: Brunovský, Čanda (SVK)
7 December; 20:45	Kviesgaard 4	(14–6)	Lekić 7	Gigantium Arena, Aalborg; Attendance: 6,223; Referees: Brunovský, Čanda (SVK)
7 December; 20:45	3× (yellow card) 2× (suspension)	Report	3× (yellow card) 1× (suspension)	Gigantium Arena, Aalborg; Attendance: 6,223; Referees: Brunovský, Čanda (SVK)

9 December; 18:45	Serbia	23 – 26	Spain	Gigantium Arena, Aalborg; Attendance: 4,625; Referees: Kékes, Kékes (HUN)
9 December; 18:45	Lekić, Damnjanović 6	(9–14)	Alberto 5	Gigantium Arena, Aalborg; Attendance: 4,625; Referees: Kékes, Kékes (HUN)
9 December; 18:45	2× (yellow card) 1× (suspension)	Report	1× (suspension)	Gigantium Arena, Aalborg; Attendance: 4,625; Referees: Kékes, Kékes (HUN)

9 December; 20:45	Romania	22 – 25	Denmark	Gigantium Arena, Aalborg; Attendance: 6,476; Referees: Bonaventura, Bonaventura (FRA)
9 December; 20:45	Neagu 8	(15–14)	Norgaard 7	Gigantium Arena, Aalborg; Attendance: 6,476; Referees: Bonaventura, Bonaventura (FRA)
9 December; 20:45	4× (yellow card) 1× (suspension)	Report	3× (yellow card) 1× (suspension)	Gigantium Arena, Aalborg; Attendance: 6,476; Referees: Bonaventura, Bonaventura (FRA)

11 December; 18:45	Romania	40 – 28	Serbia	Gigantium Arena, Aalborg; Attendance: 5,800; Referees: Cohen, Peretz (ISR)
11 December; 18:45	Neagu 7	(20–14)	Krpež 6	Gigantium Arena, Aalborg; Attendance: 5,800; Referees: Cohen, Peretz (ISR)
11 December; 18:45	1× (yellow card) 3× (suspension)	Report	3× (yellow card) 4× (suspension)	Gigantium Arena, Aalborg; Attendance: 5,800; Referees: Cohen, Peretz (ISR)

11 December; 20:45	Spain	19 – 22	Denmark	Gigantium Arena, Aalborg; Attendance: 6,607; Referees: Opava, Válek (CZE)
11 December; 20:45	Mangue 4	(9–12)	Troelsen 6	Gigantium Arena, Aalborg; Attendance: 6,607; Referees: Opava, Válek (CZE)
11 December; 20:45	4× (yellow card) 4× (suspension)	Report	3× (yellow card) 1× (suspension)	Gigantium Arena, Aalborg; Attendance: 6,607; Referees: Opava, Válek (CZE)

=== Group B (Aarhus) ===
Pos	Team	Pld	W	D	L	GF	GA	GD	Pts	Qualification
1	Russia	3	2	0	1	82	69	+13	4	Main round
2	Montenegro	3	2	0	1	78	74	+4	4	Main round
3	Croatia	3	2	0	1	88	83	+5	4	Main round
4	Iceland	3	0	0	3	69	91	−22	0	

All times are Central European Time (UTC+1)

7 December; 18:15	Montenegro	24 – 22	Russia	NRGi Atletion Arena, Aarhus; Attendance: 600; Referees: Kékes, Kékes (HUN)
7 December; 18:15	Popović 9	(10–15)	Kuznetsova, Turey 4	NRGi Atletion Arena, Aarhus; Attendance: 600; Referees: Kékes, Kékes (HUN)
7 December; 18:15	3× (yellow card) 4× (suspension) 1× (red card)	Report	3× (yellow card) 4× (suspension)	NRGi Atletion Arena, Aarhus; Attendance: 600; Referees: Kékes, Kékes (HUN)

7 December; 20:15	Croatia	35 – 25	Iceland	NRGi Atletion Arena, Aarhus; Attendance: 300; Referees: Cohen, Peretz (ISR)
7 December; 20:15	Franić 9	(19–12)	Stefánsdóttir 6	NRGi Atletion Arena, Aarhus; Attendance: 300; Referees: Cohen, Peretz (ISR)
7 December; 20:15	3× (yellow card) 2× (suspension)	Report	3× (yellow card) 3× (suspension)	NRGi Atletion Arena, Aarhus; Attendance: 300; Referees: Cohen, Peretz (ISR)

9 December; 18:15	Iceland	23 – 26	Montenegro	NRGi Atletion Arena, Aarhus; Attendance: 1,200; Referees: Arntsen, Gullaksen (NOR)
9 December; 18:15	Skúladóttir 8	(10–14)	Radičević, Savić 6	NRGi Atletion Arena, Aarhus; Attendance: 1,200; Referees: Arntsen, Gullaksen (NOR)
9 December; 18:15	2× (yellow card) 2× (suspension)	Report	2× (yellow card) 4× (suspension)	NRGi Atletion Arena, Aarhus; Attendance: 1,200; Referees: Arntsen, Gullaksen (NOR)

9 December; 20:15	Russia	30 – 24	Croatia	NRGi Atletion Arena, Aarhus; Attendance: 900; Referees: Opava, Válek (CZE)
9 December; 20:15	Kochetova 6	(16–11)	Pušić, Franić 7	NRGi Atletion Arena, Aarhus; Attendance: 900; Referees: Opava, Válek (CZE)
9 December; 20:15	3× (yellow card) 6× (suspension)	Report	3× (yellow card) 4× (suspension)	NRGi Atletion Arena, Aarhus; Attendance: 900; Referees: Opava, Válek (CZE)

11 December; 18:15	Russia	30 – 21	Iceland	NRGi Atletion Arena, Aarhus; Attendance: 1,150; Referees: Bonaventura, Bonaventura (FRA)
11 December; 18:15	Kochetova 6	(16–9)	Bragadóttir 5	NRGi Atletion Arena, Aarhus; Attendance: 1,150; Referees: Bonaventura, Bonaventura (FRA)
11 December; 18:15	3× (yellow card) 2× (suspension)	Report	2× (yellow card) 6× (suspension)	NRGi Atletion Arena, Aarhus; Attendance: 1,150; Referees: Bonaventura, Bonaventura (FRA)

11 December; 20:15	Montenegro	28 – 29	Croatia	NRGi Atletion Arena, Aarhus; Attendance: 900; Referees: Brunovský, Čanda (SVK)
11 December; 20:15	Popović 11	(12–13)	Penezić 10	NRGi Atletion Arena, Aarhus; Attendance: 900; Referees: Brunovský, Čanda (SVK)
11 December; 20:15	3× (yellow card) 6× (suspension)	Report	2× (yellow card) 4× (suspension)	NRGi Atletion Arena, Aarhus; Attendance: 900; Referees: Brunovský, Čanda (SVK)

=== Group C (Larvik) ===
Pos	Team	Pld	W	D	L	GF	GA	GD	Pts	Qualification
1	Sweden	3	3	0	0	85	68	+17	6	Main round
2	Netherlands	3	1	0	2	70	68	+2	2	Main round
3	Ukraine	3	1	0	2	71	81	−10	2	Main round
4	Germany	3	1	0	2	78	87	−9	2	

All times are Central European Time (UTC+1)

7 December; 17:45	Germany	25 – 27	Sweden	Arena Larvik, Larvik; Attendance: 1,956; Referees: Gubica, Milošević (CRO)
7 December; 17:45	Mietzner 6	(14–12)	Gulldén 7	Arena Larvik, Larvik; Attendance: 1,956; Referees: Gubica, Milošević (CRO)
7 December; 17:45	3× (yellow card) 3× (suspension)	Report	3× (yellow card) 5× (suspension)	Arena Larvik, Larvik; Attendance: 1,956; Referees: Gubica, Milošević (CRO)

7 December; 19:45	Ukraine	13 – 25	Netherlands	Arena Larvik, Larvik; Attendance: 607; Referees: Lythje, Christiansen (DEN)
7 December; 19:45	Shymkute 5	(8–13)	Visser 10	Arena Larvik, Larvik; Attendance: 607; Referees: Lythje, Christiansen (DEN)
7 December; 19:45	3× (yellow card) 1× (suspension)	Report	3× (yellow card) 5× (suspension)	Arena Larvik, Larvik; Attendance: 607; Referees: Lythje, Christiansen (DEN)

8 December; 17:45	Sweden	33 – 25	Ukraine	Arena Larvik, Larvik; Attendance: 1,034; Referees: Florescu, Duţă (ROU)
8 December; 17:45	Torstensson 7	(18–15)	Vashchuk 6	Arena Larvik, Larvik; Attendance: 1,034; Referees: Florescu, Duţă (ROU)
8 December; 17:45	3× (yellow card) 3× (suspension)	Report	2× (yellow card) 3× (suspension)	Arena Larvik, Larvik; Attendance: 1,034; Referees: Florescu, Duţă (ROU)

8 December; 19:45	Netherlands	27 – 30	Germany	Arena Larvik, Larvik; Attendance: 1,058; Referees: Lythje, Christiansen (DEN)
8 December; 19:45	van der Heijden 7	(18–17)	Lörper 7	Arena Larvik, Larvik; Attendance: 1,058; Referees: Lythje, Christiansen (DEN)
8 December; 19:45	3× (yellow card) 7× (suspension)	Report	3× (yellow card) 5× (suspension)	Arena Larvik, Larvik; Attendance: 1,058; Referees: Lythje, Christiansen (DEN)

10 December; 17:45	Sweden	25 – 18	Netherlands	Arena Larvik, Larvik; Attendance: 1,205; Referees: Stoļarovs, Līcis (LAT)
10 December; 17:45	Gulldén 6	(14–6)	van der Wissel 6	Arena Larvik, Larvik; Attendance: 1,205; Referees: Stoļarovs, Līcis (LAT)
10 December; 17:45	3× (yellow card) 2× (suspension)	Report	2× (yellow card) 1× (suspension)	Arena Larvik, Larvik; Attendance: 1,205; Referees: Stoļarovs, Līcis (LAT)

10 December; 19:45	Germany	23 – 33	Ukraine	Arena Larvik, Larvik; Attendance: 894; Referees: Pavićević, Ražnatović (MNE)
10 December; 19:45	Jurack 6	(10–15)	Manaharova 8	Arena Larvik, Larvik; Attendance: 894; Referees: Pavićević, Ražnatović (MNE)
10 December; 19:45	3× (yellow card) 2× (suspension)	Report	3× (yellow card) 1× (suspension)	Arena Larvik, Larvik; Attendance: 894; Referees: Pavićević, Ražnatović (MNE)

=== Group D (Lillehammer) ===
Pos	Team	Pld	W	D	L	GF	GA	GD	Pts	Qualification
1	Norway (H)	3	3	0	0	99	51	+48	6	Main round
2	Hungary	3	2	0	1	62	71	−9	4	Main round
3	France	3	1	0	2	69	73	−4	2	Main round
4	Slovenia	3	0	0	3	54	89	−35	0	

(H) Hosts

All times are Central European Time (UTC+1)

7 December; 18:15	Hungary	28 – 19	Slovenia	Håkons Hall, Lillehammer; Attendance: 4,300; Referees: Guseva, Vartanyan (RUS)
7 December; 18:15	Bulath 6	(16–10)	Zrnec 5	Håkons Hall, Lillehammer; Attendance: 4,300; Referees: Guseva, Vartanyan (RUS)
7 December; 18:15	2× (yellow card) 5× (suspension)	Report	2× (yellow card) 2× (suspension)	Håkons Hall, Lillehammer; Attendance: 4,300; Referees: Guseva, Vartanyan (RUS)

7 December; 20:15	Norway	33 – 22	France	Håkons Hall, Lillehammer; Attendance: 5,145; Referees: Pavićević, Ražnatović (MNE)
7 December; 20:15	Riegelhuth 7	(19–10)	Deroin 4	Håkons Hall, Lillehammer; Attendance: 5,145; Referees: Pavićević, Ražnatović (MNE)
7 December; 20:15	3× (yellow card) 3× (suspension)	Report	3× (yellow card) 3× (suspension)	Håkons Hall, Lillehammer; Attendance: 5,145; Referees: Pavićević, Ražnatović (MNE)

8 December; 18:15	France	18 – 21	Hungary	Håkons Hall, Lillehammer; Attendance: 2,178; Referees: Stoļarovs, Līcis (LAT)
8 December; 18:15	Lacrabère 6	(7–12)	Bulath 5	Håkons Hall, Lillehammer; Attendance: 2,178; Referees: Stoļarovs, Līcis (LAT)
8 December; 18:15	3× (yellow card) 2× (suspension)	Report	3× (yellow card) 6× (suspension)	Håkons Hall, Lillehammer; Attendance: 2,178; Referees: Stoļarovs, Līcis (LAT)

8 December; 20:15	Slovenia	16 – 32	Norway	Håkons Hall, Lillehammer; Attendance: 2,674; Referees: Guseva, Vartanyan (RUS)
8 December; 20:15	Gros 4	(6–19)	Løke 7	Håkons Hall, Lillehammer; Attendance: 2,674; Referees: Guseva, Vartanyan (RUS)
8 December; 20:15	3× (yellow card) 3× (suspension)	Report	2× (yellow card) 2× (suspension)	Håkons Hall, Lillehammer; Attendance: 2,674; Referees: Guseva, Vartanyan (RUS)

10 December; 18:15	France	29 – 19	Slovenia	Håkons Hall, Lillehammer; Attendance: 5,050; Referees: Florescu, Duţă (ROU)
10 December; 18:15	Signaté 7	(15–9)	Jeriček 8	Håkons Hall, Lillehammer; Attendance: 5,050; Referees: Florescu, Duţă (ROU)
10 December; 18:15	3× (yellow card) 2× (suspension)	Report	3× (yellow card) 3× (suspension)	Håkons Hall, Lillehammer; Attendance: 5,050; Referees: Florescu, Duţă (ROU)

10 December; 20:15	Norway	34 – 13	Hungary	Håkons Hall, Lillehammer; Attendance: 10,185; Referees: Gubica, Milošević (CRO)
10 December; 20:15	Løke 7	(19–7)	Szucsánszki 6	Håkons Hall, Lillehammer; Attendance: 10,185; Referees: Gubica, Milošević (CRO)
10 December; 20:15	3× (yellow card) 1× (suspension)	Report	3× (yellow card) 6× (suspension)	Håkons Hall, Lillehammer; Attendance: 10,185; Referees: Gubica, Milošević (CRO)

== Main round ==
Top 2 teams from each group advanced to the Semifinals, while the third placed team from each group competed in a 5th/6th place play-off.

=== Group I (Herning) ===
Pos	Team	Pld	W	D	L	GF	GA	GD	Pts	Qualification
1	Denmark (H)	5	4	0	1	133	110	+23	8	Semifinals
2	Romania	5	3	0	2	126	129	−3	6	Semifinals
3	Montenegro	5	3	0	2	125	123	+2	6	Fifth-place game
4	Russia	5	2	0	3	129	124	+5	4	
5	Croatia	5	2	0	3	117	142	−25	4	
6	Spain	5	1	0	4	117	119	−2	2	

(H) Hosts

All times are Central European Time (UTC+1)

13 December; 16:45	Spain	20 – 22	Montenegro	MCH Indoor Arena, Herning; Attendance: 3,000; Referees: Kékes, Kékes (HUN)
13 December; 16:45	Alberto 6	(12–12)	Popović 6	MCH Indoor Arena, Herning; Attendance: 3,000; Referees: Kékes, Kékes (HUN)
13 December; 16:45	2× (yellow card) 3× (suspension)	Report	3× (yellow card) 4× (suspension)	MCH Indoor Arena, Herning; Attendance: 3,000; Referees: Kékes, Kékes (HUN)

13 December; 18:45	Romania	31 – 22	Croatia	MCH Indoor Arena, Herning; Attendance: 8,000; Referees: Opava, Válek (CZE)
13 December; 18:45	Neagu, Manea 7	(14–12)	Penezić 6	MCH Indoor Arena, Herning; Attendance: 8,000; Referees: Opava, Válek (CZE)
13 December; 18:45	1× (yellow card)	Report	3× (yellow card) 4× (suspension)	MCH Indoor Arena, Herning; Attendance: 8,000; Referees: Opava, Válek (CZE)

13 December; 20:45	Denmark	26 – 20	Russia	MCH Indoor Arena, Herning; Attendance: 11,454; Referees: Brunovský, Čanda (SVK)
13 December; 20:45	Augustesen 7	(11–10)	Kuznetcova 4	MCH Indoor Arena, Herning; Attendance: 11,454; Referees: Brunovský, Čanda (SVK)
13 December; 20:45	3× (yellow card) 2× (suspension)	Report	3× (yellow card) 1× (suspension) 1× (red card)	MCH Indoor Arena, Herning; Attendance: 11,454; Referees: Brunovský, Čanda (SVK)

14 December; 16:45	Romania	23 – 21	Montenegro	MCH Indoor Arena, Herning; Attendance: 3,420; Referees: Brunovský, Čanda (SVK)
14 December; 16:45	Neagu 11	(13–12)	Popović 7	MCH Indoor Arena, Herning; Attendance: 3,420; Referees: Brunovský, Čanda (SVK)
14 December; 16:45	1× (yellow card) 1× (suspension)	Report	3× (yellow card) 2× (suspension)	MCH Indoor Arena, Herning; Attendance: 3,420; Referees: Brunovský, Čanda (SVK)

14 December; 18:45	Spain	30 – 22	Russia	MCH Indoor Arena, Herning; Attendance: 9,430; Referees: Bonaventura, Bonaventura (FRA)
14 December; 18:45	Pena 8	(16–12)	Davydenko, Vetkova 5	MCH Indoor Arena, Herning; Attendance: 9,430; Referees: Bonaventura, Bonaventura (FRA)
14 December; 18:45	3× (yellow card) 4× (suspension)	Report	3× (yellow card) 4× (suspension)	MCH Indoor Arena, Herning; Attendance: 9,430; Referees: Bonaventura, Bonaventura (FRA)

14 December; 20:45	Denmark	31 – 19	Croatia	MCH Indoor Arena, Herning; Attendance: 11,304; Referees: Kékes, Kékes (HUN)
14 December; 20:45	Kviesgaard 7	(16–10)	Horvat 4	MCH Indoor Arena, Herning; Attendance: 11,304; Referees: Kékes, Kékes (HUN)
14 December; 20:45	3× (yellow card) 4× (suspension)	Report	3× (yellow card) 2× (suspension)	MCH Indoor Arena, Herning; Attendance: 11,304; Referees: Kékes, Kékes (HUN)

16 December; 16:45	Romania	20 – 35	Russia	MCH Indoor Arena, Herning; Attendance: 3,980; Referees: Arntsen, Gullaksen (NOR)
16 December; 16:45	Geiger 6	(10–19)	Sen 6	MCH Indoor Arena, Herning; Attendance: 3,980; Referees: Arntsen, Gullaksen (NOR)
16 December; 16:45	2× (yellow card) 2× (suspension)	Report	2× (yellow card) 2× (suspension)	MCH Indoor Arena, Herning; Attendance: 3,980; Referees: Arntsen, Gullaksen (NOR)

16 December; 18:45	Spain	22 – 23	Croatia	MCH Indoor Arena, Herning; Attendance: 7,630; Referees: Opava, Válek (CZE)
16 December; 18:45	three players 5	(10–11)	Penezić 8	MCH Indoor Arena, Herning; Attendance: 7,630; Referees: Opava, Válek (CZE)
16 December; 18:45	3× (yellow card) 2× (suspension)	Report	3× (yellow card) 2× (suspension)	MCH Indoor Arena, Herning; Attendance: 7,630; Referees: Opava, Válek (CZE)

16 December; 20:45	Denmark	29 – 30	Montenegro	MCH Indoor Arena, Herning; Attendance: 11,461; Referees: Bonaventura, Bonaventura (FRA)
16 December; 20:45	Dalby 8	(18–14)	Popović 8	MCH Indoor Arena, Herning; Attendance: 11,461; Referees: Bonaventura, Bonaventura (FRA)
16 December; 20:45	3× (yellow card) 1× (suspension)	Report	2× (yellow card) 2× (suspension)	MCH Indoor Arena, Herning; Attendance: 11,461; Referees: Bonaventura, Bonaventura (FRA)

=== Group II (Lillehammer) ===
Pos	Team	Pld	W	D	L	GF	GA	GD	Pts	Qualification
1	Sweden	5	4	0	1	127	103	+24	8	Semifinals
2	Norway (H)	5	4	0	1	153	91	+62	8	Semifinals
3	France	5	3	0	2	116	115	+1	6	Fifth-place game
4	Netherlands	5	2	0	3	104	115	−11	4	
5	Hungary	5	2	0	3	98	128	−30	4	
6	Ukraine	5	0	0	5	101	147	−46	0	

(H) Hosts

All times are Central European Time (UTC+1)

12 December; 16:15	Netherlands	21 – 23	France	Håkons Hall; Attendance: 2,133; Referees: Gubica, Milošević (CRO)
12 December; 16:15	Visser 9	(10–13)	Dembélé, Deroin, Lacrabère, Signaté, Spincer 3	Håkons Hall; Attendance: 2,133; Referees: Gubica, Milošević (CRO)
12 December; 16:15	3× (yellow card) 2× (suspension)	Report	3× (yellow card) 2× (suspension)	Håkons Hall; Attendance: 2,133; Referees: Gubica, Milošević (CRO)

12 December; 18:15	Ukraine	25 – 26	Hungary	Håkons Hall; Attendance: 2,471; Referees: Gjeding, Hansen (DEN)
12 December; 18:15	Pidpalova 9	(12–14)	Szucsánszki 6	Håkons Hall; Attendance: 2,471; Referees: Gjeding, Hansen (DEN)
12 December; 18:15	3× (yellow card) 4× (suspension)	Report	2× (yellow card) 5× (suspension)	Håkons Hall; Attendance: 2,471; Referees: Gjeding, Hansen (DEN)

12 December; 20:15	Sweden	24 – 19	Norway	Håkons Hall; Attendance: 6,535; Referees: Guseva, Vartanyan (RUS)
12 December; 20:15	Torstensson 7	(13–6)	Alstad 5	Håkons Hall; Attendance: 6,535; Referees: Guseva, Vartanyan (RUS)
12 December; 20:15	2× (yellow card) 4× (suspension)	Report	2× (yellow card)	Håkons Hall; Attendance: 6,535; Referees: Guseva, Vartanyan (RUS)

14 December; 16:15	Netherlands	27 – 19	Hungary	Håkons Hall; Attendance: 346; Referees: Stoļarovs, Līcis (LAT)
14 December; 16:15	Van der Heijden, Visser 6	(15–10)	Szucsánszki 6	Håkons Hall; Attendance: 346; Referees: Stoļarovs, Līcis (LAT)
14 December; 16:15	3× (yellow card) 4× (suspension) 1× (red card)	Report	3× (yellow card) 4× (suspension) 1× (red card)	Håkons Hall; Attendance: 346; Referees: Stoļarovs, Līcis (LAT)

14 December; 18:15	Sweden	21 – 22	France	Håkons Hall; Attendance: 2,150; Referees: Gjeding, Hansen (DEN)
14 December; 18:15	Torstensson 8	(9–11)	Pineau, Signaté 4	Håkons Hall; Attendance: 2,150; Referees: Gjeding, Hansen (DEN)
14 December; 18:15	1× (yellow card) 3× (suspension) 1× (red card)	Report	3× (yellow card) 2× (suspension)	Håkons Hall; Attendance: 2,150; Referees: Gjeding, Hansen (DEN)

14 December; 20:15	Ukraine	19 – 32	Norway	Håkons Hall; Attendance: 3,527; Referees: Florescu, Duţă (ROU)
14 December; 20:15	Laiuk, Zoria 3	(6–13)	Løke 6	Håkons Hall; Attendance: 3,527; Referees: Florescu, Duţă (ROU)
14 December; 20:15	3× (yellow card) 2× (suspension)	Report	3× (yellow card) 1× (suspension)	Håkons Hall; Attendance: 3,527; Referees: Florescu, Duţă (ROU)

15 December; 16:15	Ukraine	19 – 31	France	Håkons Hall; Attendance: 711; Referees: Gubica, Milošević (CRO)
15 December; 16:15	Borshchenko 7	(13–16)	Pineau 6	Håkons Hall; Attendance: 711; Referees: Gubica, Milošević (CRO)
15 December; 16:15	3× (yellow card) 1× (suspension)	Report	2× (yellow card) 2× (suspension)	Håkons Hall; Attendance: 711; Referees: Gubica, Milošević (CRO)

15 December; 18:15	Sweden	24 – 19	Hungary	Håkons Hall; Attendance: 2,340; Referees: Florescu, Duţă (ROU)
15 December; 18:15	Torstensson 8	(10–12)	Szucsánszki 8	Håkons Hall; Attendance: 2,340; Referees: Florescu, Duţă (ROU)
15 December; 18:15	2× (yellow card) 1× (suspension)	Report	3× (yellow card) 4× (suspension)	Håkons Hall; Attendance: 2,340; Referees: Florescu, Duţă (ROU)

15 December; 20:15	Netherlands	13 – 35	Norway	Håkons Hall; Attendance: 5,123; Referees: Guseva, Vartanyan (RUS)
15 December; 20:15	Abbingh 4	(9–18)	Løke 7	Håkons Hall; Attendance: 5,123; Referees: Guseva, Vartanyan (RUS)
15 December; 20:15	2× (yellow card) 2× (suspension)	Report	2× (yellow card) 1× (suspension)	Håkons Hall; Attendance: 5,123; Referees: Guseva, Vartanyan (RUS)

== Final round ==
=== Knockout map ===
Semifinal
18 December (Herning)
Denmark	19
Norway	29
18 December (Herning)
Romania	23
Sweden	25

Final
19 December (Herning)
Norway	25
Sweden	20
Bronze Match
19 December (Herning)
Denmark	15
Romania	16

=== 5th-place match ===
18 December; 11:30	Montenegro	19 – 23	France	MCH Indoor Arena, Herning; Attendance: 3,320; Referees: Kekes, Kekes (HUN)
18 December; 11:30	Popović 5	(5–12)	Signaté 7	MCH Indoor Arena, Herning; Attendance: 3,320; Referees: Kekes, Kekes (HUN)
18 December; 11:30	3× (yellow card)	Report	2× (yellow card) 2× (suspension)	MCH Indoor Arena, Herning; Attendance: 3,320; Referees: Kekes, Kekes (HUN)

=== Semifinals ===
18 December; 14:30	Romania	23 – 25	Sweden	MCH Indoor Arena, Herning; Attendance: 9,600; Referees: Brunovský, Čanda (SVK)
18 December; 14:30	Neagu 7	(13–14)	Torstensson 9	MCH Indoor Arena, Herning; Attendance: 9,600; Referees: Brunovský, Čanda (SVK)
18 December; 14:30	3× (yellow card) 2× (suspension)	Report	3× (yellow card) 2× (suspension)	MCH Indoor Arena, Herning; Attendance: 9,600; Referees: Brunovský, Čanda (SVK)

18 December; 17:00	Denmark	19 – 29	Norway	MCH Indoor Arena, Herning; Attendance: 11,411; Referees: Gubica, Milošević (CRO)
18 December; 17:00	Skov 5	(10–14)	Sulland 7	MCH Indoor Arena, Herning; Attendance: 11,411; Referees: Gubica, Milošević (CRO)
18 December; 17:00	3× (yellow card) 3× (suspension)	Report	2× (yellow card) 2× (suspension)	MCH Indoor Arena, Herning; Attendance: 11,411; Referees: Gubica, Milošević (CRO)

=== Bronze-medal match ===
19 December; 14:30	Denmark	15 – 16	Romania	MCH Indoor Arena, Herning; Attendance: 11,004; Referees: Bonaventura, Bonaventura (FRA)
19 December; 14:30	Nørgaard, Skov 4	(7–9)	Neagu 6	MCH Indoor Arena, Herning; Attendance: 11,004; Referees: Bonaventura, Bonaventura (FRA)
19 December; 14:30	3× (yellow card) 3× (suspension)	Report	2× (yellow card) 1× (suspension)	MCH Indoor Arena, Herning; Attendance: 11,004; Referees: Bonaventura, Bonaventura (FRA)

=== Final ===
19 December; 17:00	Norway	25 – 20	Sweden	MCH Indoor Arena, Herning; Attendance: 11,004; Referees: Gjeding, Hansen (DEN)
19 December; 17:00	Løke, Hammerseng 5	(10–11)	Gulldén 7	MCH Indoor Arena, Herning; Attendance: 11,004; Referees: Gjeding, Hansen (DEN)
19 December; 17:00	1× (yellow card) 1× (suspension)	Report	3× (yellow card) 2× (suspension)	MCH Indoor Arena, Herning; Attendance: 11,004; Referees: Gjeding, Hansen (DEN)

== Final ranking and statistics ==
Qualified for the 2011 World Championship

Rank	Team
Gold medal	Norway
Silver medal	Sweden
Bronze medal	Romania
4	Denmark
5	France
6	Montenegro
7	Russia
8	Netherlands
9	Croatia
10	Hungary
11	Spain
12	Ukraine
13	Germany
14	Serbia
15	Iceland
16	Slovenia

Source: EuroHandball.com

2010 Women's European Champions

Norway
5th title

=== All-Star Team ===
- Goalkeeper: Katrine Lunde Haraldsen (NOR)
- Left wing: Mie Augustesen (DEN)
- Left back: Cristina Neagu (ROU)
- Playmaker: Gro Hammerseng (NOR)
- Pivot: Heidi Løke (NOR)
- Right back: Nerea Pena (ESP)
- Right wing: Maibritt Kviesgaard (DEN)

Chosen by team officials and EHF experts: EHF-Euro.com

=== Other awards ===
- Most Valuable Player: Linnea Torstensson (SWE)
- Best Defence Player: Johanna Wiberg (SWE)

Chosen by team officials and EHF experts: EHF-Euro.com

=== Top goalkeepers ===
Rank	Name	Team	%	Saves	Shots
1	Katrine Lunde Haraldsen	Norway	47%	96	205
2	Amandine Leynaud	France	44%	88	198
3	Kari Aalvik Grimsbø	Norway	42%	27	64
3	Cecilia Grubbström	Sweden	42%	57	137
3	Mariya Sidorova	Russia	42%	71	168
3	Talida Tolnai	Romania	42%	95	227
7	Karin Mortensen	Denmark	41%	99	241
7	Clara Woltering	Germany	41%	18	44
9	Silvia Navarro	Spain	39%	59	151
9	Katalin Pálinger	Hungary	39%	70	178

Source: SportResult.com Archived 2011-12-29 at the Wayback Machine

=== Top goalscorers ===
Rank	Name	Team	Goals	Shots	%
1	Cristina Neagu	Romania	53	105	50%
2	Linnea Torstensson	Sweden	48	90	53%
3	Bojana Popović	Montenegro	46	85	54%
4	Heidi Løke	Norway	40	47	85%
5	Isabelle Gulldén	Sweden	36	65	55%
5	Maura Visser	Netherlands	36	65	55%
7	Zita Szucsánszki	Hungary	34	63	54%
8	Marija Jovanović	Montenegro	31	76	41%
8	Andrea Penezić	Croatia	31	62	50%
10	Ionela Stanca	Romania	28	34	82%

Source: SportResult.com Archived 2011-12-29 at the Wayback Machine

=== Best defender ===
Rank	Name	Team	Block	Steals	Total
1	Tonje Larsen	Norway	13	9	22
2	Linnea Torstensson	Sweden	9	11	20
3	Isabelle Gulldén	Sweden	10	7	17
3	Gro Hammerseng	Norway	11	6	17
5	Marit Malm Frafjord	Norway	7	9	16
6	Aurelia Brădeanu	Romania	9	5	14
6	Andrea Penezić	Croatia	11	3	14
6	Maria Tivadar	Romania	5	9	14
9	Milena Knežević	Montenegro	5	7	12
9	Mette Melgaard	Denmark	2	10	12
9	Allison Pineau	France	5	7	12
9	Maura Visser	Netherlands	5	7	12

Source: SportResult.com Archived 2011-12-29 at the Wayback Machine

=== Most assists ===
Rank	Name	Team	Assists
1	Cristina Neagu	Romania	36
2	Isabelle Gulldén	Sweden	30
3	Linnea Torstensson	Sweden	26
4	Bojana Popović	Montenegro	24
5	Gro Hammerseng	Norway	21
6	Maura Visser	Netherlands	20
7	Tonje Larsen	Norway	19
8	Trine Troelsen	Denmark	18
9	Pearl van der Wissel	Netherlands	17
10	Tonje Nøstvold	Norway	16

Source: SportResult.com Archived 2011-12-29 at the Wayback Machine
