= Marina Tankaskaya =

Azerbaijani handball player (born 1983)

Personal information
- Nationality: Azerbaijani
- Born: July 30, 1983 (age 43) Baku, Azerbaijani SSR
- Height: 1.74 m (5 ft 9 in)

Sport
- Sport: Handball
- Position: Center Back
- Current club: Muratpaşa
- Number: 3
National team
- Years: Team
- –: Azerbaijan

Marina Tankaskaya (born July 30, 1983) is an Azerbaijani female handballer playing for Muratpaşa and the Azerbaijan national team.

She played for ABU Baku (2001–2006, 2007–2008, 2013–2014) and Garadagh HC Baku (2006–2007) in her country before she moved to Turkey to join the Istanbul-based team Üsküdar Bld. SK (2009–2010) playing in the Turkish Women's Handball Super League. After one season, she transferred to Muratpaşa Bld. SK (2010–2013) in Antalya. From 2014 on, she plays for Yenimahalle Bld. SK in Ankara.
