= 2010 European Women's Handball Championship qualification – Group 1 =

== Group 1 ==
Pos	Team	Pld	W	D	L	GF	GA	GD	Pts	Qualification	UKR	ROU	SUI	POR
1	Ukraine	6	5	1	0	197	160	+37	11	Final tournament	—	27–27	33–20	32–23
2	Romania	6	4	1	1	219	153	+66	9	Final tournament	35–36	—	37–26	37–23
3	Switzerland	6	2	0	4	143	184	−41	4		24–33	18–39	—	28–25
4	Portugal	6	0	0	6	142	204	−62	0		31–36	23–44	17–27	—

Source: EHF

All times are local

14 October 2009; 18:00	Ukraine	33–20	Switzerland	Citysporthall, Zaporizhia; Attendance: 1,000; Referees: Mitrunen, Sundell (FIN)
14 October 2009; 18:00	Managarova, Tsyhytsia 6	(19–6)	Dinkel 8	Citysporthall, Zaporizhia; Attendance: 1,000; Referees: Mitrunen, Sundell (FIN)
14 October 2009; 18:00	2× (yellow card) 1× (suspension)	Report	2× (yellow card) 3× (suspension)	Citysporthall, Zaporizhia; Attendance: 1,000; Referees: Mitrunen, Sundell (FIN)

14 October 2009; 19:00	Romania	37–23	Portugal	Radu Voina Sportshall, Sighişoara; Attendance: 1,100; Referees: Aliyev, Aghakishiyev (AZE)
14 October 2009; 19:00	Vărzaru 6	(19–8)	Barbosa, de Sousa 5	Radu Voina Sportshall, Sighişoara; Attendance: 1,100; Referees: Aliyev, Aghakishiyev (AZE)
14 October 2009; 19:00	3× (yellow card) 3× (suspension)	Report	3× (yellow card) 4× (suspension)	Radu Voina Sportshall, Sighişoara; Attendance: 1,100; Referees: Aliyev, Aghakishiyev (AZE)

17 October 2009; 15:45	Switzerland	18–39	Romania	Saalsporthall, Zürich; Attendance: 700; Referees: C. Bonaventura, J. Bonaventura (FRA)
17 October 2009; 15:45	Dinkel, Petrig 4	(7–20)	Puşcaşu 8	Saalsporthall, Zürich; Attendance: 700; Referees: C. Bonaventura, J. Bonaventura (FRA)
17 October 2009; 15:45	2× (yellow card) 5× (suspension)	Report	2× (yellow card) 1× (suspension)	Saalsporthall, Zürich; Attendance: 700; Referees: C. Bonaventura, J. Bonaventura (FRA)

17 October 2009; 17:15	Portugal	31–36	Ukraine	Pavilhão Municipal de Lagos, Lagos; Attendance: 800; Referees: Krstić, Ljubič (SLO)
17 October 2009; 17:15	Barbosa, de Sousa 8	(16–18)	Nikolayenko 11	Pavilhão Municipal de Lagos, Lagos; Attendance: 800; Referees: Krstić, Ljubič (SLO)
17 October 2009; 17:15	3× (yellow card) 3× (suspension)	Report	3× (yellow card) 4× (suspension)	Pavilhão Municipal de Lagos, Lagos; Attendance: 800; Referees: Krstić, Ljubič (SLO)

31 March 2010; 18:00	Ukraine	27–27	Romania	Yunost Palace of Sports, Zaporizhia; Attendance: 1,700; Referees: Bonifert, Oláh (HUN)
31 March 2010; 18:00	Nikolayenko 8	(18–14)	Neagu 9	Yunost Palace of Sports, Zaporizhia; Attendance: 1,700; Referees: Bonifert, Oláh (HUN)
31 March 2010; 18:00	3× (yellow card) 2× (suspension)	Report	3× (yellow card) 2× (suspension)	Yunost Palace of Sports, Zaporizhia; Attendance: 1,700; Referees: Bonifert, Oláh (HUN)

31 March 2010; 20:00	Switzerland	28–25	Portugal	Sporthalle Tägerhard, Wettingen; Referees: Jurinović, Mrvica (CRO)
31 March 2010; 20:00	Dinkel 10	(14–14)	de Sousa 6	Sporthalle Tägerhard, Wettingen; Referees: Jurinović, Mrvica (CRO)
31 March 2010; 20:00	2× (yellow card) 4× (suspension)	Report	2× (yellow card) 4× (suspension) 1× (red card)	Sporthalle Tägerhard, Wettingen; Referees: Jurinović, Mrvica (CRO)

3 April 2010; 12:00	Romania	35–36	Ukraine	Sala Sporturilor Romeo Iamandi, Buzău; Attendance: 1,800; Referees: Nikolov, Nachevski (MKD)
3 April 2010; 12:00	Neagu 10	(17–15)	Pidpalova 10	Sala Sporturilor Romeo Iamandi, Buzău; Attendance: 1,800; Referees: Nikolov, Nachevski (MKD)
3 April 2010; 12:00	3× (yellow card) 3× (suspension)	Report	3× (yellow card) 3× (suspension)	Sala Sporturilor Romeo Iamandi, Buzău; Attendance: 1,800; Referees: Nikolov, Nachevski (MKD)

3 April 2010; 17:00	Portugal	17–27	Switzerland	Pavilhão Municipal, Moimenta da Beira; Attendance: 1,100; Referees: Di Domenico, Fornasier (ITA)
3 April 2010; 17:00	de Sousa 5	(12–13)	Bosshart 9	Pavilhão Municipal, Moimenta da Beira; Attendance: 1,100; Referees: Di Domenico, Fornasier (ITA)
3 April 2010; 17:00	3× (yellow card) 3× (suspension)	Report	3× (yellow card) 6× (suspension)	Pavilhão Municipal, Moimenta da Beira; Attendance: 1,100; Referees: Di Domenico, Fornasier (ITA)

26 May 2010; 19:00	Portugal	23–44	Romania	Leiria; Referees: Evers, Kums (BEL)
26 May 2010; 19:00	de Sousa 7	(12–20)	Neagu, Stanca 7	Leiria; Referees: Evers, Kums (BEL)
26 May 2010; 19:00	3× (yellow card) 3× (suspension)	Report	2× (yellow card) 4× (suspension)	Leiria; Referees: Evers, Kums (BEL)

26 May 2010; 19:30	Switzerland	24–33	Ukraine	Sporthalle Mittelholz, Herzogenbuchsee; Referees: Chaskis, Tsakonas (GRE)
26 May 2010; 19:30	Dinkel 10	(14–14)	Managarova 7	Sporthalle Mittelholz, Herzogenbuchsee; Referees: Chaskis, Tsakonas (GRE)
26 May 2010; 19:30	4× (yellow card) 4× (suspension)	Report	3× (yellow card) 3× (suspension)	Sporthalle Mittelholz, Herzogenbuchsee; Referees: Chaskis, Tsakonas (GRE)

29 May 2010; 11:00	Romania	37–26	Switzerland	Sala Sporturilor, Târgu Mureş; Attendance: 2,000; Referees: Constantinou, Mouttas (CYP)
29 May 2010; 11:00	Manea 6	(18–11)	Geissmann 7	Sala Sporturilor, Târgu Mureş; Attendance: 2,000; Referees: Constantinou, Mouttas (CYP)
29 May 2010; 11:00	3× (yellow card) 1× (suspension)	Report	4× (yellow card) 3× (suspension)	Sala Sporturilor, Târgu Mureş; Attendance: 2,000; Referees: Constantinou, Mouttas (CYP)

30 May 2010; 17:00	Ukraine	32–23	Portugal	Yunost Palace of Sports, Zaporizhia; Attendance: 1,500; Referees: Erdoğan, Özdeniz (TUR)
30 May 2010; 17:00	Pidpalova 7	(17–11)	Andrade, de Sousa 5	Yunost Palace of Sports, Zaporizhia; Attendance: 1,500; Referees: Erdoğan, Özdeniz (TUR)
30 May 2010; 17:00	2× (yellow card) 3× (suspension)	Report	3× (yellow card) 1× (suspension)	Yunost Palace of Sports, Zaporizhia; Attendance: 1,500; Referees: Erdoğan, Özdeniz (TUR)
