= Valeriia Zoria =

Ukrainian handball player

Personal information
- Nationality: Ukrainian
- Born: 23 April 1987 (age 39) Kiev, Ukraine
- Height: 1.80 m (5 ft 11 in)

Sport
- Sport: Handball
- Position: Pivot
- Current club: Ankara Yenimahalle BSK
- Number: 7
National team
| Years | Team | Apps | (Gls) |
| – | Ukraine | 11 | (18) |

Valeriia Zoria (born 23 April 1987) is a Ukrainian handball player for HC Gomel and the Ukrainian national team.
