= Eleni Poimenidou =

Greek handball player (born 1980)

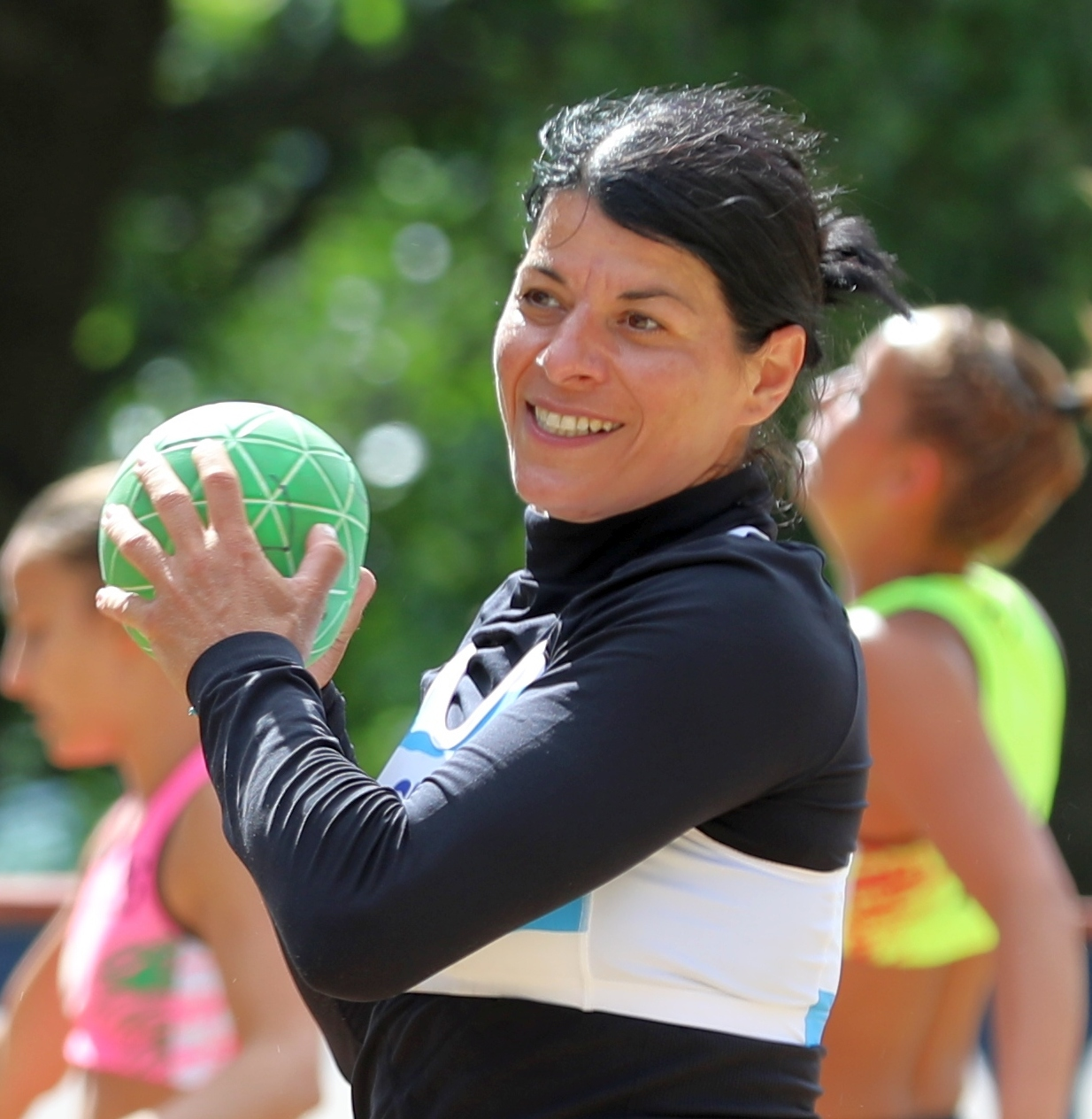
Poimenidou at the 2019 Beach handball Euro

Eleni Poimenidou (born 4 July 1980) is a Greek handball player who competed in the 2004 Summer Olympics.
