= Harpa Sif Eyjólfsdóttir =

Icelandic handball player (born 1987)

Personal information
- Nationality: Icelandic
- Born: May 9, 1987 (age 39)
- Height: 179 cm (70 in)

Sport
- Sport: Handball
- Position: Right back

Senior clubs
- Years: Team
- 2004-2008: UMF Stjarnan
- 2010-2012: Spårvägens HF
National team
Years	Team	Apps	(Gls)
–	Iceland	44	(62)

Harpa Sif Eyjólfsdóttir (born May 9, 1987) is an Icelandic team handball player. She plays on the Icelandic national team, and participated at the 2011 World Women's Handball Championship in Brazil.
