= 2010 European Women's Handball Championship qualification – Group 4 =

== Group 4 ==
Pos	Team	Pld	W	D	L	GF	GA	GD	Pts	Qualification	GER	SLO	BLR	ITA
1	Germany	6	6	0	0	205	129	+76	12	Final tournament	—	27–17	35–24	45–19
2	Slovenia	6	3	0	3	163	162	+1	6	Final tournament	24–35	—	30–21	34–22
3	Belarus	6	3	0	3	166	176	−10	6		26–30	31–30	—	32–23
4	Italy	6	0	0	6	137	204	−67	0		19–33	26–28	28–32	—

Source: EHF

All times are local

14 October 2009; 18:30	Belarus	32–23	Italy	Sport Complex Olympiets, Mogilev; Attendance: 1,300; Referees: Hascik, Otapka (SVK)
14 October 2009; 18:30	Haizhutsite 7	(16–7)	Federspieler 6	Sport Complex Olympiets, Mogilev; Attendance: 1,300; Referees: Hascik, Otapka (SVK)
14 October 2009; 18:30	3× (yellow card) 4× (suspension)	Report	3× (yellow card) 5× (suspension)	Sport Complex Olympiets, Mogilev; Attendance: 1,300; Referees: Hascik, Otapka (SVK)

14 October 2009; 19:30	Germany	27–17	Slovenia	Rittal Arena Wetzlar, Wetzlar; Attendance: 2,000; Referees: Raluy, Sabroso (ESP)
14 October 2009; 19:30	Müller 6	(10–10)	Gros 4	Rittal Arena Wetzlar, Wetzlar; Attendance: 2,000; Referees: Raluy, Sabroso (ESP)
14 October 2009; 19:30	3× (yellow card) 4× (suspension)	Report	2× (yellow card) 5× (suspension)	Rittal Arena Wetzlar, Wetzlar; Attendance: 2,000; Referees: Raluy, Sabroso (ESP)

17 October 2009; 18:15	Slovenia	30–21	Belarus	Dvorana Kodeljevo, Ljubljana; Attendance: 600; Referees: Opava, Válek (CZE)
17 October 2009; 18:15	Gros 7	(17–10)	Haizhutsite 7	Dvorana Kodeljevo, Ljubljana; Attendance: 600; Referees: Opava, Válek (CZE)
17 October 2009; 18:15	3× (yellow card) 3× (suspension)	Report	3× (yellow card) 4× (suspension)	Dvorana Kodeljevo, Ljubljana; Attendance: 600; Referees: Opava, Válek (CZE)

18 October 2009; 12:00	Italy	19–33	Germany	PalaGeTur, Lignano Sabbiadoro; Attendance: 300; Referees: Rakytina, Tkachuk (UKR)
18 October 2009; 12:00	Scamperle 6	(8–18)	Neukamp 7	PalaGeTur, Lignano Sabbiadoro; Attendance: 300; Referees: Rakytina, Tkachuk (UKR)
18 October 2009; 12:00	3× (yellow card) 2× (suspension)	Report	3× (yellow card) 4× (suspension)	PalaGeTur, Lignano Sabbiadoro; Attendance: 300; Referees: Rakytina, Tkachuk (UKR)

31 March 2010; 18:00	Belarus	26–30	Germany	Sport Complex Olympiets, Mogilev; Attendance: 2,000; Referees: Stenrand, Kærlund Birch (DEN)
31 March 2010; 18:00	Haizhutsite 6	(15–16)	Müller 6	Sport Complex Olympiets, Mogilev; Attendance: 2,000; Referees: Stenrand, Kærlund Birch (DEN)
31 March 2010; 18:00	3× (yellow card) 5× (suspension)	Report	3× (yellow card) 4× (suspension)	Sport Complex Olympiets, Mogilev; Attendance: 2,000; Referees: Stenrand, Kærlund Birch (DEN)

1 April 2010; 20:00	Italy	26–28	Slovenia	Pallazzetto Comunale F. Tacca, Cassano Magnago; Attendance: 600; Referees: Constantinou, Mouttas (CYP)
1 April 2010; 20:00	Marcantonio, Pavlyk 5	(14–16)	Varlec 10	Pallazzetto Comunale F. Tacca, Cassano Magnago; Attendance: 600; Referees: Constantinou, Mouttas (CYP)
1 April 2010; 20:00	3× (yellow card) 2× (suspension)	Report	3× (yellow card) 4× (suspension)	Pallazzetto Comunale F. Tacca, Cassano Magnago; Attendance: 600; Referees: Constantinou, Mouttas (CYP)

4 April 2010; 17:00	Germany	35–24	Belarus	Anhalt Arena, Dessau; Attendance: 2,100; Referees: C. Bonaventura, J. Bonaventura (FRA)
4 April 2010; 17:00	Neukamp 7	(15–11)	Artsiukhovich 7	Anhalt Arena, Dessau; Attendance: 2,100; Referees: C. Bonaventura, J. Bonaventura (FRA)
4 April 2010; 17:00	2× (yellow card) 1× (suspension)	Report	3× (yellow card) 2× (suspension)	Anhalt Arena, Dessau; Attendance: 2,100; Referees: C. Bonaventura, J. Bonaventura (FRA)

4 April 2010; 17:00	Slovenia	34–22	Italy	Športna Dvorana Bonifika, Koper; Attendance: 1,500; Referees: Kaveshnikov, Plotnikov (RUS)
4 April 2010; 17:00	Argenti 6	(17–7)	Scamperle 8	Športna Dvorana Bonifika, Koper; Attendance: 1,500; Referees: Kaveshnikov, Plotnikov (RUS)
4 April 2010; 17:00	3× (yellow card) 2× (suspension)	Report	3× (yellow card) 4× (suspension)	Športna Dvorana Bonifika, Koper; Attendance: 1,500; Referees: Kaveshnikov, Plotnikov (RUS)

26 May 2010; 18:15	Italy	28–32	Belarus	Pallazzetto Comunale F. Tacca, Cassano Magnago; Attendance: 600; Referees: I. Kostov, M. Kostov (BUL)
26 May 2010; 18:15	Popescu 13	(12–16)	Kurchankova 7	Pallazzetto Comunale F. Tacca, Cassano Magnago; Attendance: 600; Referees: I. Kostov, M. Kostov (BUL)
26 May 2010; 18:15	3× (yellow card) 3× (suspension)	Report	3× (yellow card) 4× (suspension)	Pallazzetto Comunale F. Tacca, Cassano Magnago; Attendance: 600; Referees: I. Kostov, M. Kostov (BUL)

26 May 2010; 20:00	Slovenia	24–35	Germany	Dvorana Leon Štukelj, Novo Mesto; Attendance: 1,500; Referees: Horváth, Márton (HUN)
26 May 2010; 20:00	Gros 5	(11–19)	Althaus 9	Dvorana Leon Štukelj, Novo Mesto; Attendance: 1,500; Referees: Horváth, Márton (HUN)
26 May 2010; 20:00	3× (yellow card) 4× (suspension)	Report	3× (yellow card) 4× (suspension)	Dvorana Leon Štukelj, Novo Mesto; Attendance: 1,500; Referees: Horváth, Márton (HUN)

30 May 2010; 16:00	Germany	45–19	Italy	Freudenstadt; Attendance: 800; Referees: Skruzny, Kavulic (SVK)
30 May 2010; 16:00	Neukamp 7	(20–9)	Popescu 6	Freudenstadt; Attendance: 800; Referees: Skruzny, Kavulic (SVK)
30 May 2010; 16:00	2× (yellow card) 3× (suspension)	Report	2× (yellow card)	Freudenstadt; Attendance: 800; Referees: Skruzny, Kavulic (SVK)

30 May 2010; 16:00	Belarus	31–30	Slovenia	Sport Complex Olympiets, Mogilev; Attendance: 1,200; Referees: Baranowski, Lemanowicz (POL)
30 May 2010; 16:00	Haizhutsite, Kurchankova 7	(16–16)	Gros, Son 7	Sport Complex Olympiets, Mogilev; Attendance: 1,200; Referees: Baranowski, Lemanowicz (POL)
30 May 2010; 16:00	3× (yellow card) 2× (suspension)	Report	3× (yellow card) 3× (suspension)	Sport Complex Olympiets, Mogilev; Attendance: 1,200; Referees: Baranowski, Lemanowicz (POL)
