= Kristýna Salčáková =

Czech handball player

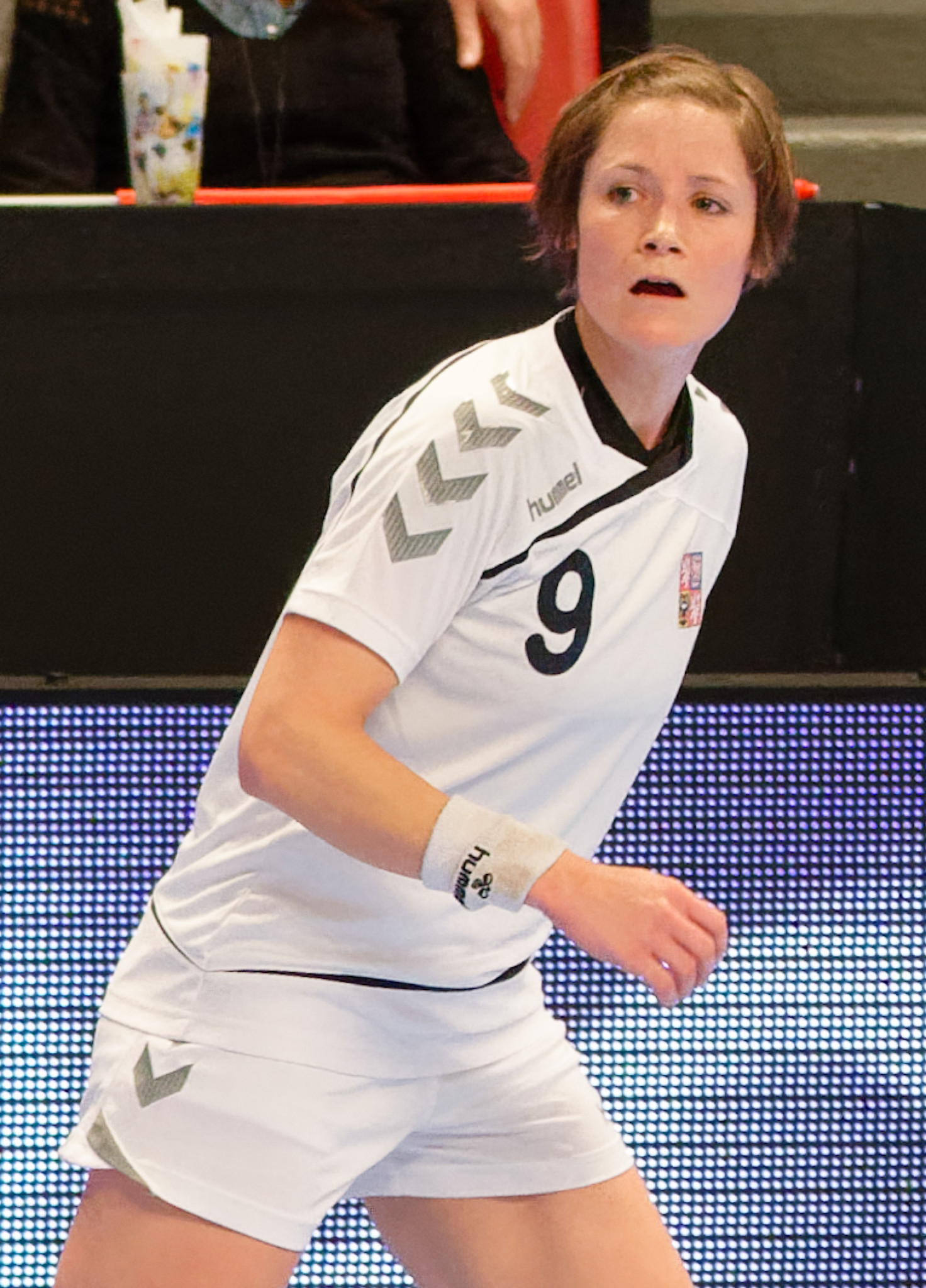

Personal information
- Nationality: Czech
- Born: 13 August 1987 (age 39)
- Height: 1.63 m (5 ft 4 in)

Sport
- Sport: Handball
- Position: Left wing
- Current club: Achenheim Truchtersheim
- Number: 23
National team
Years	Team	Apps	(Gls)
2005–	Czech Republic	137	(176)

Kristýna Salčáková (born 13 August 1987) is a Czech handball player for Achenheim Truchtersheim and the Czech national team.

She participated at the 2018 European Women's Handball Championship.
