= Maura Visser =

Dutch handball player (born 1985)

Personal information
- Nationality: Dutch
- Born: 1 June 1985 (age 41) The Hague, Netherlands
- Height: 1.78 m (5 ft 10 in)

Sport
- Sport: Handball
- Position: Centre back
- Current club: SG BBM Bietigheim
- Number: 3

Senior clubs
- Years: Team
- 2009–2011: KIF Vejen
- 2011–2014: HC Leipzig
- 2014–2015: Viborg HK
- 2015–2020: SG BBM Bietigheim
National team
Years	Team	Apps	(Gls)
2005–2018	Netherlands	139	(451)
Medal record
European Championship
Silver medal – second place	2016 Sweden
Bronze medal – third place	2018 France

Maura Visser (born 1 June 1985) is a Dutch handballer who plays as a playmaker for SG BBM Bietigheim.

She competed at the 2010 European Women's Handball Championship, where the Dutch team placed eighth, and Visser was listed among the top ten goalscorers of the tournament (scoring 36 goals). She was taken off the national team after the 2011 World Championships but was selected by new head coach Helle Thomsen to make her return at the 2016 European Championships where the Dutch national team won silver.
