= Ioanna Fotiadou =

Greek handball player (born 1977)

Ioanna Fotiadou (born 22 November 1977) is a Greek handball player who competed in the 2004 Summer Olympics.
