= Monika Stachowska =

Polish handball player (born 1981)

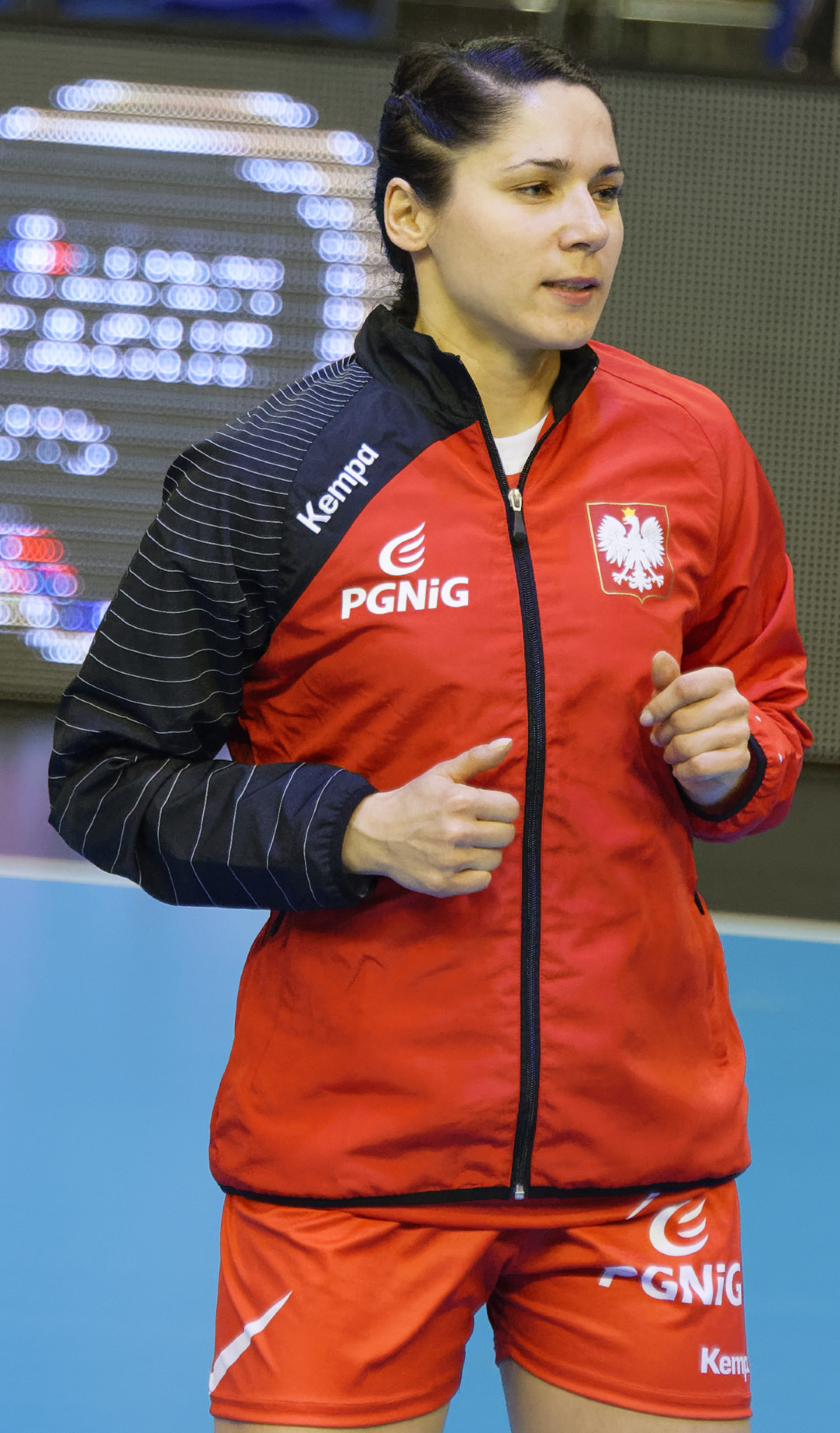

Personal information
- Nationality: Polish
- Born: 2 January 1981 (age 45) Toruń, Poland
- Height: 1.79 m (5 ft 10 in)

Sport
- Sport: Handball
- Position: Pivot
- Current club: SPR Pogoń Szczecin
- Number: 6
National team
Years	Team	Apps	(Gls)
–	Poland	109	(148)

Monika Stachowska (born 2 January 1981) is a Polish handball player. She plays for the club SPR Pogoń Szczecin, the Polish national team and represented Poland at the 2013 World Women's Handball Championship in Serbia.
