= Hanna Guðrún Stefánsdóttir =

Icelandic handball player (born 1979)

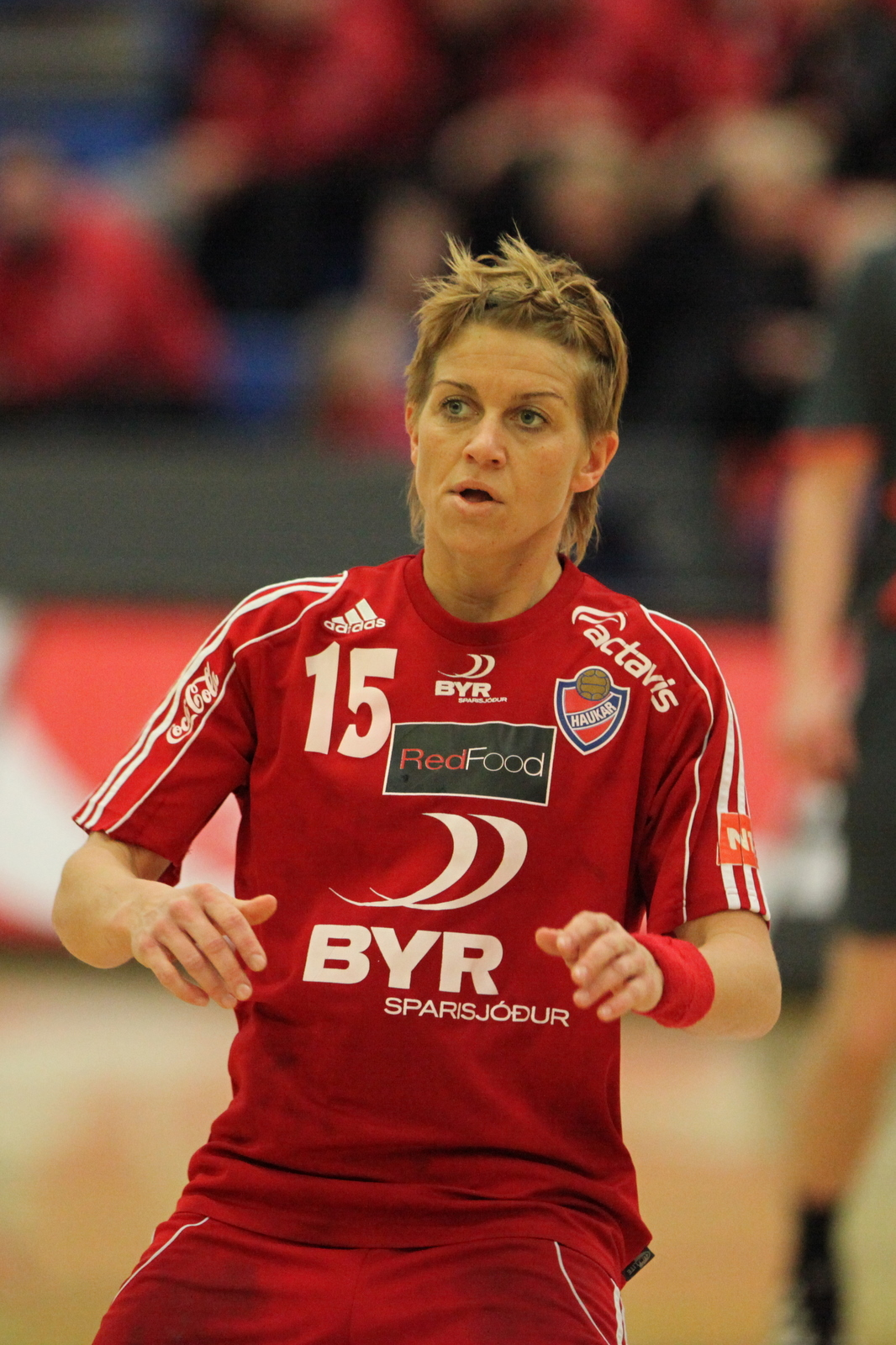
- Hanna in 2009 with Haukar.

Personal information
- Nationality: Icelandic
- Born: 11 February 1979 (age 47)
- Height: 1.64 m (5 ft 5 in)

Sport
- Sport: Handball
- Position: Right wing
- Current club: Stjarnan
- Number: 15

Senior clubs
- Years: Team
- 1995–2003: Haukar
- 2003–2004: Team Tvis Holstebro
- 2004–2010: Haukar
- 2010–2023: Stjarnan
National team
Years	Team	Apps	(Gls)
–	Iceland	142	(458)
- Updated on 2 July 2021

Hanna Guðrún Stefánsdóttir (born 11 February 1979) is an Icelandic team handball player for Stjarnan of the Úrvalsdeild kvenna. She has won the Icelandic championship five times and the Icelandic Cup six times. She has been selected the Úrvalsdeild Player of the Year three times and led the league in scoring in 2003, 2005 and 2009. Hanna has participated in three major international tournaments with the Icelandic national team and is second all-time in both games and goals scored for the team with 458 goals in 142 games.

== Career ==
Hanna started her career during the 1995–1996 season with Haukar. Hanna joined Stjarnan in 2010. On 15 January 2011, she scored 22 goals in a 49–17 win against ÍR. In July 2019, she signed a one-year contract extension with Stjarnan.

In July 2021, she signed a 2-year contract extension with Stjarnan. In April 2023, she announced that she would retire following the season.

== National handball team ==
Hanna is the second most capped player in Iceland's national handball team history with 142 games. She participated at the 2011 World Women's Handball Championship in Brazil.

== Awards, titles and accomplishments ==
=== Awards ===
- Icelandic Female Handball Player of the Year: 2009
- Úrvalsdeild kvenna Player of the Year (4): 2003, 2005, 2009, 2010

=== Titles ===
- Icelandic champion (5): 1996, 1997, 2001, 2002, 2005
- Icelandic Cup (5): 1997, 2006, 2007, 2016, 2017

=== Accomplishments ===
- Úrvalsdeild kvenna Top goal scorer (5): 2003, 2005, 2006, 2009, 2010
