= Azerbaijan women's national handball team =

The Azerbaijan women's national handball team is the national team of Azerbaijan. It takes part in international team handball competitions.

The team was founded in 1992 after the dissolution of the Soviet Union. It has yet to participate in a European or World championship.

== Events ==
=== Handball at the Islamic Solidarity Games ===
- Handball at the 2017 Islamic Solidarity Games – 1st place
- Handball at the 2021 Islamic Solidarity Games – 2nd place
- Handball at the 2025 Islamic Solidarity Games – 6th place

=== Carpathian Trophy (women's handball) ===
1. 2005: 4th
