= 2012 European Women's Handball Championship =

2012 EHF European Women's Handball Championship
- EHF Euro 2012 official logo

Tournament details
- Host country: Serbia
- Venues: 5 (in 4 host cities)
- Dates: 4–16 December
- Teams: 16 (from 1 confederation)

Final positions
- Champions: Montenegro (1st title)
- Runners-up: Norway
- Third place: Hungary
- Fourth place: Serbia

Tournament statistics
- Matches played: 47
- Goals scored: 2,381 (50.66 per match)
- Attendance: 122,604 (2,609 per match)
- Top scorer(s): Katarina Bulatović (MNE) (56 goals)

Awards
- Best player: Anja Edin (NOR)

The 2012 European Women's Handball Championship was held in Serbia from 4 to 16 December. Originally the tournament was scheduled to be held in the Netherlands but on 4 June 2012 the Dutch Handball Federation withdrew from the organization. Subsequently, the European Handball Federation (EHF) launched a new bidding process and eventually selected Serbia as the new host on 18 June 2012.

Montenegro captured their first title by defeating defending champion Norway 34–31 in the final.

== Host selection ==
Initially on its meeting on 27 September 2008 the EHF awarded the championship to the Netherlands, defeating Ukraine in the second round of voting while Germany and Serbia withdrew their candidacy during the congress. This could have been the second time for Netherlands to host the tournament, however, on 4 June 2012 the Dutch Handball Federation announced they are unable to organize the European Championship. A day later the EHF re-launched the host selection process; ten nations had shown interest in organizing the competition, including Croatia, Denmark, Iceland, Macedonia, Norway, Poland, Russia, Serbia, Slovakia and Sweden. Romania added their interest the day after. On 18 June 2012 the EHF granted the organizational rights to Serbia and also disposed of the fate of the Dutch national team. Since Serbia, the new host already qualified for the European Championship, the place reserved for the host nation was passed to Iceland as the best non-qualified team and the Netherlands were pulled out from the tournament.

== Venues ==
Five venues in four cities had been selected to host the matches:

Group stage	
Vršac	Niš
Millennium Center; Capacity: 4,000	Čair Sports Center; Capacity: 5,000
Group&Knockout stage	Knockout stage
Novi Sad	Belgrade
Spens Sports Center; Capacity: 11,500	Kombank Arena; Capacity: 23,000

City	Arena	Capacity	Round
Belgrade	Kombank Arena	20,000	Group A, Main Round, Semifinals and Finals
Novi Sad	Spens Arena	8,000	Group C, Main Round
Vršac	Millennium Centar	4,058	Group D
Niš	Čair Sports Center	4,000	Group B

== Qualification ==
Qualification matches were played from September 2011 to June 2012. Following the new system introduced for the 2010 Men's Championship, all teams were included in the qualification round, except Netherlands who were hosts before the withdrawal. Teams were divided in 7 groups and the two top ranked teams from each group qualified.

=== Qualified teams ===
Country	Qualified as	Date qualification was secured	Previous appearances in tournament^{1}
Norway	Defending champion	19 December 2010	9 (1994, 1996, **1998**, 2000, 2002, **2004**, **2006**, **2008**, **2010**)
Croatia	Winner of group 6	24 March 2012	6 (1994, 1996, 2004, 2006, 2008, 2010)
Czech Republic	Runner-up of group 5	25 March 2012	3 (1994, 2002, 2004)
Sweden	Winner of group 5	25 March 2012	7 (1994, 1996, 2002, 2004, 2006, 2008, 2010)
Germany	Winner of group 1	30 May 2012	9 (1994, 1996, 1998, 2000, 2002, 2004, 2006, 2008, 2010)
Hungary	Runner-up of group 1	30 May 2012	9 (1994, 1996, 1998, **2000**, 2002, 2004, 2006, 2008, 2010)
Romania	Winner of group 2	30 May 2012	8 (1994, 1996, 1998, 2000, 2002, 2004, 2008, 2010)
Serbia	Runner-up of group 2	30 May 2012	2 ( 2008, 2010)
France	Winner of group 4	30 May 2012	6 (2000, 2002, 2004, 2006, 2008, 2010)
Denmark	Runner-up of group 6	2 June 2012	9 (**1994**, **1996**, 1998, 2000, **2002**, 2004, 2006, 2008, 2010)
Spain	Runner-up of group 7	2 June 2012	6 (1998, 2002, 2004, 2006, 2008, 2010)
Ukraine	Winner of group 7	3 June 2012	9 (1994, 1996, 1998, 2000, 2002, 2004, 2006, 2008, 2010)
Macedonia	Runner-up of group 4	3 June 2012	4 (1998, 2000, 2006, 2008)
Montenegro	Winner of group 3	3 June 2012	1 (2010)
Russia	Runner-up of group 3	3 June 2012	9 (1994, 1996, 1998, 2000, 2002, 2004, 2006, 2008, 2010)
Iceland	Awarded final place	18 June 2012	1 (2010)

^{1} Bold indicates champion for that year.

== Referees ==
12 referee pairs were selected:

Referees
Belarus	Andrei Gousko; Siarhei Repkin
Croatia	Helena Crnojević; Emina Kostecki-Radić
Czech Republic	Jiří Opava; Pavel Válek
Denmark	Marlene Kroløkke Lythje; Karina Christiansen
France	Charlotte Bonaventura; Julie Bonaventura
Hungary	Péter Horvárth; Balázs Márton

Referees
Latvia	Zigmārs Stoļarovs; Renārs Līcis
Poland	Joanna Brehmer; Agnieszka Skowronek
Romania	Diana-Carmen Florescu; Anamaria Duţă
Serbia	Branka Marić; Zorica Mašić
Slovakia	Peter Brunovský; Vladimír Čanda
Spain	Andreu Marín; Ignacio García

== Seeding ==
The draw was scheduled to be held on 6 June 2012 at 14:00 local time in Rotterdam, Netherlands. The draw procedure was announced on 15 May. It was canceled because of the withdrawal of the Dutch Handball Federation. The draw was rescheduled to 22 June 2012 in Monaco. The pots were new assigned due to the removal of the Netherlands and the addition of Iceland.

Pot 1	Pot 2	Pot 3	Pot 4
Norway; Sweden; Romania; Croatia	France; Montenegro; Germany; Ukraine	Serbia; Denmark; Russia; Hungary	Spain; Czech Republic; Macedonia; Iceland

== Preliminary round ==
The draw was held on 22 June 2012. The playing schedule was released on 13 July.

All times are local (UTC+1).

=== Group A ===
Pos	Team	Pld	W	D	L	GF	GA	GD	Pts	Qualification
1	Norway	3	3	0	0	67	62	+5	6	Main round
2	Serbia (H)	3	2	0	1	79	75	+4	4	Main round
3	Czech Republic	3	1	0	2	68	71	−3	2	Main round
4	Ukraine	3	0	0	3	62	68	−6	0	

Source: EHF
Rules for classification: 1) points; 2) head-to-head points; 3) head-to-head goal difference; 4) head-to-head number of goals scored; 5) goal difference.
(H) Hosts

4 December 2012; 17:45	Ukraine	22–25	Czech Republic	Kombank Arena, Belgrade; Attendance: 450; Referees: Brehmer, Skowronek (POL)
4 December 2012; 17:45	Borshchenko 7	(7–12)	Štěrbová, Luzumová 6	Kombank Arena, Belgrade; Attendance: 450; Referees: Brehmer, Skowronek (POL)
4 December 2012; 17:45	4× (yellow card) 6× (suspension)	Report	3× (yellow card) 2× (suspension)	Kombank Arena, Belgrade; Attendance: 450; Referees: Brehmer, Skowronek (POL)

4 December 2012; 20:15	Norway	28–26	Serbia	Kombank Arena, Belgrade; Attendance: 5,000; Referees: Marín, García (ESP)
4 December 2012; 20:15	Riegelhuth Koren 8	(17–12)	Ognjenović 9	Kombank Arena, Belgrade; Attendance: 5,000; Referees: Marín, García (ESP)
4 December 2012; 20:15	3× (yellow card) 4× (suspension) 1× (red card)	Report	4× (yellow card) 6× (suspension)	Kombank Arena, Belgrade; Attendance: 5,000; Referees: Marín, García (ESP)

6 December 2012; 18:15	Serbia	25–23	Ukraine	Kombank Arena, Belgrade; Attendance: 4,000; Referees: Florescu, Duţă (ROU)
6 December 2012; 18:15	Popović, Damnjanović 5	(14–10)	Managarova 7	Kombank Arena, Belgrade; Attendance: 4,000; Referees: Florescu, Duţă (ROU)
6 December 2012; 18:15	4× (yellow card) 3× (suspension)	Report	4× (yellow card) 7× (suspension)	Kombank Arena, Belgrade; Attendance: 4,000; Referees: Florescu, Duţă (ROU)

6 December 2012; 20:15	Czech Republic	19–21	Norway	Kombank Arena, Belgrade; Attendance: 450; Referees: Crnojević, Kostecki-Radić (CRO)
6 December 2012; 20:15	Poznarová 5	(12–10)	Sulland 8	Kombank Arena, Belgrade; Attendance: 450; Referees: Crnojević, Kostecki-Radić (CRO)
6 December 2012; 20:15	4× (yellow card) 4× (suspension)	Report	3× (yellow card) 3× (suspension)	Kombank Arena, Belgrade; Attendance: 450; Referees: Crnojević, Kostecki-Radić (CRO)

8 December 2012; 18:15	Norway	18–17	Ukraine	Kombank Arena, Belgrade; Attendance: 1,554; Referees: Stoļarovs, Līcis (LAT)
8 December 2012; 18:15	Sulland 6	(8–11)	Glibko, Borshchenko 4	Kombank Arena, Belgrade; Attendance: 1,554; Referees: Stoļarovs, Līcis (LAT)
8 December 2012; 18:15	3× (yellow card) 3× (suspension)	Report	2× (yellow card) 9× (suspension) 1× (red card)	Kombank Arena, Belgrade; Attendance: 1,554; Referees: Stoļarovs, Līcis (LAT)

8 December 2012; 20:15	Serbia	28–24	Czech Republic	Kombank Arena, Belgrade; Attendance: 4,000; Referees: Horvárth, Márton (HUN)
8 December 2012; 20:15	Lekić, Pop-Lazić 6	(12–15)	Černá, Chrenková 6	Kombank Arena, Belgrade; Attendance: 4,000; Referees: Horvárth, Márton (HUN)
8 December 2012; 20:15	3× (yellow card) 6× (suspension)	Report	3× (yellow card) 3× (suspension)	Kombank Arena, Belgrade; Attendance: 4,000; Referees: Horvárth, Márton (HUN)

=== Group B ===
Pos	Team	Pld	W	D	L	GF	GA	GD	Pts	Qualification
1	France	3	2	0	1	80	61	+19	4 (Note: France 2 Pts, +6 GD; Denmark 2 Pts, 0 GD; Sweden 2 Pts, –6 GD)	Main round
2	Denmark	3	2	0	1	91	84	+7	4	Main round
3	Sweden	3	2	0	1	70	65	+5	4	Main round
4	Macedonia	3	0	0	3	61	92	−31	0	

Source: EHF
Rules for classification: 1) points; 2) head-to-head points; 3) head-to-head goal difference; 4) head-to-head number of goals scored; 5) goal difference.
Notes:

4 December 2012; 18:15	France	29–16	Macedonia	Čair Sports Center, Niš; Attendance: 750; Referees: Horvárth, Márton (HUN)
4 December 2012; 18:15	Baudouin 8	(15–10)	Portjanko 6	Čair Sports Center, Niš; Attendance: 750; Referees: Horvárth, Márton (HUN)
4 December 2012; 18:15	3× (yellow card) 2× (suspension)	Report	2× (yellow card) 2× (suspension)	Čair Sports Center, Niš; Attendance: 750; Referees: Horvárth, Márton (HUN)

4 December 2012; 20:15	Sweden	27–26	Denmark	Čair Sports Center, Niš; Attendance: 300; Referees: Florescu, Duţă (ROU)
4 December 2012; 20:15	Ahlm 10	(13–15)	Jørgensen 6	Čair Sports Center, Niš; Attendance: 300; Referees: Florescu, Duţă (ROU)
4 December 2012; 20:15	1× (yellow card) 1× (suspension)	Report	3× (yellow card) 4× (suspension)	Čair Sports Center, Niš; Attendance: 300; Referees: Florescu, Duţă (ROU)

6 December 2012; 18:15	Macedonia	15–26	Sweden	Čair Sports Center, Niš; Attendance: 300; Referees: Stoļarovs, Līcis (LAT)
6 December 2012; 18:15	Bajramoska 4	(8–11)	Torstenson 8	Čair Sports Center, Niš; Attendance: 300; Referees: Stoļarovs, Līcis (LAT)
6 December 2012; 18:15	2× (yellow card) 2× (suspension)	Report	2× (yellow card) 1× (suspension)	Čair Sports Center, Niš; Attendance: 300; Referees: Stoļarovs, Līcis (LAT)

6 December 2012; 20:15	Denmark	28–27	France	Čair Sports Center, Niš; Attendance: 200; Referees: Brehmer, Skowronek (POL)
6 December 2012; 20:15	Nørgaard, Burgaard 7	(15–12)	Baudouin, Njitam 5	Čair Sports Center, Niš; Attendance: 200; Referees: Brehmer, Skowronek (POL)
6 December 2012; 20:15	2× (yellow card) 2× (suspension)	Report	3× (yellow card) 1× (suspension)	Čair Sports Center, Niš; Attendance: 200; Referees: Brehmer, Skowronek (POL)

8 December 2012; 18:15	Sweden	17–24	France	Čair Sports Center, Niš; Attendance: 500; Referees: Crnojević, Kostecki-Radić (CRO)
8 December 2012; 18:15	Torstenson 5	(8–13)	Signaté, Mendy 4	Čair Sports Center, Niš; Attendance: 500; Referees: Crnojević, Kostecki-Radić (CRO)
8 December 2012; 18:15	2× (yellow card) 1× (suspension)	Report	4× (yellow card) 2× (suspension)	Čair Sports Center, Niš; Attendance: 500; Referees: Crnojević, Kostecki-Radić (CRO)

8 December 2012; 20:15	Denmark	37–30	Macedonia	Čair Sports Center, Niš; Attendance: 1,000; Referees: Marín, García (ESP)
8 December 2012; 20:15	Augustesen 8	(17–13)	Crvenkoska, Portjanko 7	Čair Sports Center, Niš; Attendance: 1,000; Referees: Marín, García (ESP)
8 December 2012; 20:15	3× (yellow card) 4× (suspension)	Report	3× (yellow card) 3× (suspension)	Čair Sports Center, Niš; Attendance: 1,000; Referees: Marín, García (ESP)

=== Group C ===
Pos	Team	Pld	W	D	L	GF	GA	GD	Pts	Qualification
1	Hungary	3	2	0	1	83	80	+3	4 (Note: Hungary 32–31 Spain)	Main round
2	Spain	3	2	0	1	79	73	+6	4	Main round
3	Germany	3	1	0	2	58	63	−5	2 (Note: Croatia 16–17 Germany)	Main round
4	Croatia	3	1	0	2	65	69	−4	2	

Source: EHF
Rules for classification: 1) points; 2) head-to-head points; 3) head-to-head goal difference; 4) head-to-head number of goals scored; 5) goal difference.
Notes:

4 December 2012; 18:15	Germany	20–23	Spain	SPC Vojvodina, Novi Sad; Attendance: 1,200; Referees: Lythje, Christiansen (DEN)
4 December 2012; 18:15	Steinbach 6	(12–13)	Martín 7	SPC Vojvodina, Novi Sad; Attendance: 1,200; Referees: Lythje, Christiansen (DEN)
4 December 2012; 18:15	4× (yellow card) 5× (suspension)	Report	4× (yellow card) 3× (suspension)	SPC Vojvodina, Novi Sad; Attendance: 1,200; Referees: Lythje, Christiansen (DEN)

4 December 2012; 20:15	Croatia	28–27	Hungary	SPC Vojvodina, Novi Sad; Attendance: 1,800; Referees: Opava, Válek (CZE)
4 December 2012; 20:15	Zebić 9	(15–14)	Tomori 9	SPC Vojvodina, Novi Sad; Attendance: 1,800; Referees: Opava, Válek (CZE)
4 December 2012; 20:15	3× (yellow card) 5× (suspension)	Report	3× (yellow card) 2× (suspension)	SPC Vojvodina, Novi Sad; Attendance: 1,800; Referees: Opava, Válek (CZE)

5 December 2012; 18:15	Spain	25–21	Croatia	SPC Vojvodina, Novi Sad; Attendance: 2,000; Referees: Brunovský, Čanda (SVK)
5 December 2012; 18:15	Mangué 7	(13–10)	Zebić 7	SPC Vojvodina, Novi Sad; Attendance: 2,000; Referees: Brunovský, Čanda (SVK)
5 December 2012; 18:15	3× (yellow card) 3× (suspension)	Report	2× (yellow card) 4× (suspension)	SPC Vojvodina, Novi Sad; Attendance: 2,000; Referees: Brunovský, Čanda (SVK)

5 December 2012; 20:15	Hungary	24–21	Germany	SPC Vojvodina, Novi Sad; Attendance: 2,500; Referees: Bonaventura, Bonaventura (FRA)
5 December 2012; 20:15	Görbicz 9	(11–14)	Zapf 5	SPC Vojvodina, Novi Sad; Attendance: 2,500; Referees: Bonaventura, Bonaventura (FRA)
5 December 2012; 20:15	2× (yellow card) 2× (suspension)	Report	3× (yellow card) 4× (suspension)	SPC Vojvodina, Novi Sad; Attendance: 2,500; Referees: Bonaventura, Bonaventura (FRA)

7 December 2012; 18:15	Hungary	32–31	Spain	SPC Vojvodina, Novi Sad; Attendance: 3,700; Referees: Marić, Mašić (SRB)
7 December 2012; 18:15	Tomori 12	(17–14)	Martín 7	SPC Vojvodina, Novi Sad; Attendance: 3,700; Referees: Marić, Mašić (SRB)
7 December 2012; 18:15	3× (yellow card) 3× (suspension)	Report	2× (yellow card) 3× (suspension)	SPC Vojvodina, Novi Sad; Attendance: 3,700; Referees: Marić, Mašić (SRB)

7 December 2012; 20:15	Croatia	16–17	Germany	SPC Vojvodina, Novi Sad; Attendance: 2,100; Referees: Gousko, Repkin (BLR)
7 December 2012; 20:15	Zebić 5	(7–8)	Augsburg 4	SPC Vojvodina, Novi Sad; Attendance: 2,100; Referees: Gousko, Repkin (BLR)
7 December 2012; 20:15	3× (yellow card) 2× (suspension)	Report	3× (yellow card) 4× (suspension)	SPC Vojvodina, Novi Sad; Attendance: 2,100; Referees: Gousko, Repkin (BLR)

=== Group D ===
Pos	Team	Pld	W	D	L	GF	GA	GD	Pts	Qualification
1	Montenegro	3	3	0	0	79	63	+16	6	Main round
2	Russia	3	1	1	1	78	72	+6	3 (Note: Romania 21–21 Russia)	Main round
3	Romania	3	1	1	1	63	63	0	3	Main round
4	Iceland	3	0	0	3	56	78	−22	0	

Source: EHF
Rules for classification: 1) points; 2) head-to-head points; 3) head-to-head goal difference; 4) head-to-head number of goals scored; 5) goal difference.
Notes:

4 December 2012; 18:05	Montenegro	26–16	Iceland	Millennium Centar, Vršac; Attendance: 2,800; Referees: Gousko, Repkin (BLR)
4 December 2012; 18:05	Bulatović 7	(10–7)	Bragadóttir 5	Millennium Centar, Vršac; Attendance: 2,800; Referees: Gousko, Repkin (BLR)
4 December 2012; 18:05	3× (yellow card) 5× (suspension)	Report	3× (yellow card) 4× (suspension)	Millennium Centar, Vršac; Attendance: 2,800; Referees: Gousko, Repkin (BLR)

4 December 2012; 20:15	Romania	21–21	Russia	Millennium Centar, Vršac; Attendance: 3,200; Referees: Marić, Mašić (SRB)
4 December 2012; 20:15	Curea 9	(12–7)	Khmyrova 6	Millennium Centar, Vršac; Attendance: 3,200; Referees: Marić, Mašić (SRB)
4 December 2012; 20:15	3× (yellow card) 4× (suspension)	Report	3× (yellow card) 3× (suspension)	Millennium Centar, Vršac; Attendance: 3,200; Referees: Marić, Mašić (SRB)

5 December 2012; 18:05	Russia	27–30	Montenegro	Millennium Centar, Vršac; Attendance: 1,000; Referees: Opava, Válek (CZE)
5 December 2012; 18:05	Postnova 5	(14–20)	Knežević, Radičević 6	Millennium Centar, Vršac; Attendance: 1,000; Referees: Opava, Válek (CZE)
5 December 2012; 18:05	1× (yellow card) 1× (suspension)	Report	3× (yellow card) 4× (suspension)	Millennium Centar, Vršac; Attendance: 1,000; Referees: Opava, Válek (CZE)

5 December 2012; 20:15	Iceland	19–22	Romania	Millennium Centar, Vršac; Attendance: 2,700; Referees: Lythje, Christiansen (DEN)
5 December 2012; 20:15	Jónsdóttir 5	(13–15)	Brădeanu 7	Millennium Centar, Vršac; Attendance: 2,700; Referees: Lythje, Christiansen (DEN)
5 December 2012; 20:15	3× (yellow card) 4× (suspension)	Report	4× (yellow card) 3× (suspension)	Millennium Centar, Vršac; Attendance: 2,700; Referees: Lythje, Christiansen (DEN)

7 December 2012; 18:05	Russia	30–21	Iceland	Millennium Centar, Vršac; Attendance: 3,000; Referees: Bonaventura, Bonaventura (FRA)
7 December 2012; 18:05	Postnova, Sen 5	(15–8)	Jónsdóttir 4	Millennium Centar, Vršac; Attendance: 3,000; Referees: Bonaventura, Bonaventura (FRA)
7 December 2012; 18:05	2× (yellow card) 3× (suspension)	Report	3× (yellow card) 2× (suspension)	Millennium Centar, Vršac; Attendance: 3,000; Referees: Bonaventura, Bonaventura (FRA)

7 December 2012; 20:15	Romania	20–23	Montenegro	Millennium Centar, Vršac; Attendance: 4,000; Referees: Brunovský, Čanda (SVK)
7 December 2012; 20:15	Brădeanu 6	(10–9)	Bulatović 9	Millennium Centar, Vršac; Attendance: 4,000; Referees: Brunovský, Čanda (SVK)
7 December 2012; 20:15	4× (yellow card) 2× (suspension)	Report	3× (yellow card) 2× (suspension)	Millennium Centar, Vršac; Attendance: 4,000; Referees: Brunovský, Čanda (SVK)

== Main round ==
=== Group I ===
Pos	Team	Pld	W	D	L	GF	GA	GD	Pts	Qualification
1	Norway	5	4	0	1	140	124	+16	8	Semifinals
2	Serbia (H)	5	3	1	1	124	118	+6	7	Semifinals
3	Denmark	5	3	0	2	148	146	+2	6	Fifth place game
4	Sweden	5	2	1	2	127	127	0	5	
5	France	5	2	0	3	111	115	−4	4	
6	Czech Republic	5	0	0	5	121	141	−20	0	

Source: EHF
Rules for classification: 1) points; 2) head-to-head points; 3) head-to-head goal difference; 4) head-to-head number of goals scored; 5) goal difference.
(H) Hosts

10 December 2012; 16:10	Czech Republic	30–33	Denmark	Kombank Arena, Belgrade; Attendance: 400; Referees: Florescu, Duţă (ROU)
10 December 2012; 16:10	Knedlíková, Kutlvašrová 6	(12–13)	Nørgaard 10	Kombank Arena, Belgrade; Attendance: 400; Referees: Florescu, Duţă (ROU)
10 December 2012; 16:10	4× (yellow card)	Report	2× (yellow card) 4× (suspension)	Kombank Arena, Belgrade; Attendance: 400; Referees: Florescu, Duţă (ROU)

10 December 2012; 18:10	Norway	30–19	France	Kombank Arena, Belgrade; Attendance: 500; Referees: Marín, García (ESP)
10 December 2012; 18:10	Sulland 7	(14–10)	Baudouin 5	Kombank Arena, Belgrade; Attendance: 500; Referees: Marín, García (ESP)
10 December 2012; 18:10	3× (yellow card) 5× (suspension)	Report	3× (yellow card) 2× (suspension)	Kombank Arena, Belgrade; Attendance: 500; Referees: Marín, García (ESP)

10 December 2012; 20:10	Serbia	23–23	Sweden	Kombank Arena, Belgrade; Attendance: 5,000; Referees: Stoļarovs, Līcis (LAT)
10 December 2012; 20:10	Rajović 5	(13–14)	Torstenson 8	Kombank Arena, Belgrade; Attendance: 5,000; Referees: Stoļarovs, Līcis (LAT)
10 December 2012; 20:10	2× (yellow card) 2× (suspension)	Report	2× (yellow card)	Kombank Arena, Belgrade; Attendance: 5,000; Referees: Stoļarovs, Līcis (LAT)

11 December 2012; 16:10	Czech Republic	22–24	France	Kombank Arena, Belgrade; Attendance: 800; Referees: Brehmer, Skowronek (POL)
11 December 2012; 16:10	Chrenková 4	(10–14)	Ayglon 6	Kombank Arena, Belgrade; Attendance: 800; Referees: Brehmer, Skowronek (POL)
11 December 2012; 16:10	4× (yellow card) 2× (suspension)	Report	3× (yellow card) 2× (suspension)	Kombank Arena, Belgrade; Attendance: 800; Referees: Brehmer, Skowronek (POL)

11 December 2012; 18:10	Norway	28–25	Sweden	Kombank Arena, Belgrade; Attendance: 1,200; Referees: Horvárth, Márton (HUN)
11 December 2012; 18:10	Edin 9	(12–14)	Gulldén 10	Kombank Arena, Belgrade; Attendance: 1,200; Referees: Horvárth, Márton (HUN)
11 December 2012; 18:10	3× (yellow card) 2× (suspension)	Report	3× (yellow card)	Kombank Arena, Belgrade; Attendance: 1,200; Referees: Horvárth, Márton (HUN)

11 December 2012; 20:10	Serbia	29–26	Denmark	Kombank Arena, Belgrade; Attendance: 5,000; Referees: Marín, García (ESP)
11 December 2012; 20:10	Damnjanović 8	(16–14)	Jørgensen 5	Kombank Arena, Belgrade; Attendance: 5,000; Referees: Marín, García (ESP)
11 December 2012; 20:10	4× (yellow card) 6× (suspension)	Report	2× (yellow card) 3× (suspension)	Kombank Arena, Belgrade; Attendance: 5,000; Referees: Marín, García (ESP)

13 December 2012; 16:10	Czech Republic	26–35	Sweden	Kombank Arena, Belgrade; Attendance: 1,500; Referees: Florescu, Duţă (ROU)
13 December 2012; 16:10	Chrenková 7	(14–14)	Fogelström 7	Kombank Arena, Belgrade; Attendance: 1,500; Referees: Florescu, Duţă (ROU)
13 December 2012; 16:10	3× (yellow card) 1× (suspension)	Report	3× (yellow card) 3× (suspension)	Kombank Arena, Belgrade; Attendance: 1,500; Referees: Florescu, Duţă (ROU)

13 December 2012; 18:10	Serbia	18–17	France	Kombank Arena, Belgrade; Attendance: 8,000; Referees: Gousko, Repkin (BLR)
13 December 2012; 18:10	Rajović 5	(10–6)	Signaté 4	Kombank Arena, Belgrade; Attendance: 8,000; Referees: Gousko, Repkin (BLR)
13 December 2012; 18:10	3× (yellow card) 2× (suspension)	Report	4× (yellow card) 3× (suspension)	Kombank Arena, Belgrade; Attendance: 8,000; Referees: Gousko, Repkin (BLR)

13 December 2012; 20:10	Norway	33–35	Denmark	Kombank Arena, Belgrade; Attendance: 2,500; Referees: Horvárth, Márton (HUN)
13 December 2012; 20:10	Sulland, Alstad 6	(17–15)	Burgaard 8	Kombank Arena, Belgrade; Attendance: 2,500; Referees: Horvárth, Márton (HUN)
13 December 2012; 20:10	3× (yellow card)	Report	3× (yellow card)	Kombank Arena, Belgrade; Attendance: 2,500; Referees: Horvárth, Márton (HUN)

=== Group II ===
Pos	Team	Pld	W	D	L	GF	GA	GD	Pts	Qualification
1	Montenegro	5	4	0	1	128	123	+5	8	Semifinals
2	Hungary	5	3	0	2	132	130	+2	6	Semifinals
3	Russia	5	1	3	1	130	127	+3	5 (Note: Germany 26–26 Russia)	Fifth place game
4	Germany	5	2	1	2	119	116	+3	5	
5	Romania	5	1	1	3	114	120	−6	3 (Note: Spain 26–31 Romania)	
6	Spain	5	1	1	3	128	135	−7	3	

Source: EHF
Rules for classification: 1) points; 2) head-to-head points; 3) head-to-head goal difference; 4) head-to-head number of goals scored; 5) goal difference.
Notes:

9 December 2012; 16:15	Spain	26–31	Romania	SPC Vojvodina, Novi Sad; Attendance: 700; Referees: Bonaventura, Bonaventura (FRA)
9 December 2012; 16:15	Fernández, Mangué 5	(12–15)	Neagu, Curea 7	SPC Vojvodina, Novi Sad; Attendance: 700; Referees: Bonaventura, Bonaventura (FRA)
9 December 2012; 16:15	3× (yellow card) 4× (suspension)	Report	2× (yellow card) 2× (suspension) 1× (red card)	SPC Vojvodina, Novi Sad; Attendance: 700; Referees: Bonaventura, Bonaventura (FRA)

9 December 2012; 18:15	Hungary	26–28	Montenegro	SPC Vojvodina, Novi Sad; Attendance: 1,500; Referees: Opava, Válek (CZE)
9 December 2012; 18:15	Szucsánszki 8	(9–15)	Radičević 9	SPC Vojvodina, Novi Sad; Attendance: 1,500; Referees: Opava, Válek (CZE)
9 December 2012; 18:15	3× (yellow card) 3× (suspension) 1× (red card)	Report	2× (yellow card) 5× (suspension) 2× (red card)	SPC Vojvodina, Novi Sad; Attendance: 1,500; Referees: Opava, Válek (CZE)

9 December 2012; 20:15	Germany	26–26	Russia	SPC Vojvodina, Novi Sad; Attendance: 600; Referees: Marić, Mašić (SRB)
9 December 2012; 20:15	Steinbach 9	(16–13)	Khmyrova 6	SPC Vojvodina, Novi Sad; Attendance: 600; Referees: Marić, Mašić (SRB)
9 December 2012; 20:15	3× (yellow card) 3× (suspension)	Report	3× (yellow card) 3× (suspension)	SPC Vojvodina, Novi Sad; Attendance: 600; Referees: Marić, Mašić (SRB)

11 December 2012; 16:15	Spain	25–25	Russia	SPC Vojvodina, Novi Sad; Attendance: 800; Referees: Crnojević, Kostecki-Radić (CRO)
11 December 2012; 16:15	Martín 11	(13–14)	Postnova 7	SPC Vojvodina, Novi Sad; Attendance: 800; Referees: Crnojević, Kostecki-Radić (CRO)
11 December 2012; 16:15	3× (yellow card) 3× (suspension)	Report	3× (yellow card) 3× (suspension) 1× (red card)	SPC Vojvodina, Novi Sad; Attendance: 800; Referees: Crnojević, Kostecki-Radić (CRO)

11 December 2012; 18:15	Germany	27–20	Montenegro	SPC Vojvodina, Novi Sad; Attendance: 1,000; Referees: Bonaventura, Bonaventura (FRA)
11 December 2012; 18:15	Steinbach 7	(14–9)	Bulatović 6	SPC Vojvodina, Novi Sad; Attendance: 1,000; Referees: Bonaventura, Bonaventura (FRA)
11 December 2012; 18:15	3× (yellow card) 3× (suspension)	Report	3× (yellow card) 3× (suspension)	SPC Vojvodina, Novi Sad; Attendance: 1,000; Referees: Bonaventura, Bonaventura (FRA)

11 December 2012; 20:15	Hungary	25–19	Romania	SPC Vojvodina, Novi Sad; Attendance: 1,200; Referees: Gousko, Repkin (BLR)
11 December 2012; 20:15	Vérten 7	(14–12)	Neagu, Nechita 6	SPC Vojvodina, Novi Sad; Attendance: 1,200; Referees: Gousko, Repkin (BLR)
11 December 2012; 20:15	3× (yellow card) 2× (suspension)	Report	3× (yellow card) 1× (suspension)	SPC Vojvodina, Novi Sad; Attendance: 1,200; Referees: Gousko, Repkin (BLR)

13 December 2012; 16:15	Spain	23–27	Montenegro	SPC Vojvodina, Novi Sad; Attendance: 1,200; Referees: Brehmer, Skowronek (POL)
13 December 2012; 16:15	Fernández 7	(16–13)	Bulatović 6	SPC Vojvodina, Novi Sad; Attendance: 1,200; Referees: Brehmer, Skowronek (POL)
13 December 2012; 16:15	4× (yellow card) 4× (suspension)	Report	4× (yellow card) 7× (suspension)	SPC Vojvodina, Novi Sad; Attendance: 1,200; Referees: Brehmer, Skowronek (POL)

13 December 2012; 18:15	Germany	25–23	Romania	SPC Vojvodina, Novi Sad; Attendance: 1,200; Referees: Opava, Válek (CZE)
13 December 2012; 18:15	Steinbach 8	(16–9)	Vădineanu, Nechita 7	SPC Vojvodina, Novi Sad; Attendance: 1,200; Referees: Opava, Válek (CZE)
13 December 2012; 18:15	3× (yellow card) 3× (suspension)	Report	4× (yellow card) 2× (suspension) 1× (red card)	SPC Vojvodina, Novi Sad; Attendance: 1,200; Referees: Opava, Válek (CZE)

13 December 2012; 20:15	Hungary	25–31	Russia	SPC Vojvodina, Novi Sad; Attendance: 1,200; Referees: Crnojević, Kostecki-Radić (CRO)
13 December 2012; 20:15	Rédei Soós 5	(11–13)	Ilyina 7	SPC Vojvodina, Novi Sad; Attendance: 1,200; Referees: Crnojević, Kostecki-Radić (CRO)
13 December 2012; 20:15	3× (yellow card) 2× (suspension)	Report	3× (yellow card) 4× (suspension)	SPC Vojvodina, Novi Sad; Attendance: 1,200; Referees: Crnojević, Kostecki-Radić (CRO)

== Knockout stage ==
=== Bracket ===
Semi-finals
15 December
Norway	30
Hungary	19
15 December
Serbia	26
Montenegro	27

Final
16 December
Norway	31
Montenegro (ET)	34
Third place
16 December
Hungary (ET)	41
Serbia	38

=== Semifinals ===
15 December 2012; 14:30	Norway	30–19	Hungary	Kombank Arena, Belgrade; Attendance: 5,000; Referees: Bonaventura, Bonaventura (FRA)
15 December 2012; 14:30	Edin, Riegelhuth Koren 6	(16–11)	Görbicz 6	Kombank Arena, Belgrade; Attendance: 5,000; Referees: Bonaventura, Bonaventura (FRA)
15 December 2012; 14:30	3× (yellow card) 4× (suspension)	Report	3× (yellow card) 3× (suspension)	Kombank Arena, Belgrade; Attendance: 5,000; Referees: Bonaventura, Bonaventura (FRA)

15 December 2012; 17:00	Serbia	26–27	Montenegro	Kombank Arena, Belgrade; Attendance: 13,000; Referees: Stoļarovs, Līcis (LAT)
15 December 2012; 17:00	Filipović 7	(14–13)	Knežević 8	Kombank Arena, Belgrade; Attendance: 13,000; Referees: Stoļarovs, Līcis (LAT)
15 December 2012; 17:00	3× (yellow card) 4× (suspension)	Report	4× (yellow card) 3× (suspension)	Kombank Arena, Belgrade; Attendance: 13,000; Referees: Stoļarovs, Līcis (LAT)

=== Fifth place game ===
15 December 2012; 12:00	Denmark	32–30	Russia	Kombank Arena, Belgrade; Attendance: 800; Referees: Marić, Mašić (SRB)
15 December 2012; 12:00	Nørgaard, Burgaard 8	(15–15)	Sen 6	Kombank Arena, Belgrade; Attendance: 800; Referees: Marić, Mašić (SRB)
15 December 2012; 12:00	3× (yellow card) 5× (suspension)	Report	3× (yellow card) 3× (suspension)	Kombank Arena, Belgrade; Attendance: 800; Referees: Marić, Mašić (SRB)

=== Third place game ===
16 December 2012
14:30
Hungary
41–38 (ET)
Serbia
Kombank Arena, Belgrade
Attendance: 11,000
Referees: Gousko, Repkin (BLR)
Viktória Rédei Soós 9
(21–19)
three players 7
4× (yellow card) 1× (suspension)
Report
4× (yellow card) 4× (suspension)

FT: 33–33 ET: 8–5

=== Final ===
16 December 2012
17:00
Norway
31–34 (ET)
Montenegro
Kombank Arena, Belgrade
Attendance: 10,000
Referees: Marín, García (ESP)
Alstad 11
(11–12)
Knežević 10
3× (yellow card) 2× (suspension)
Report
4× (yellow card) 7× (suspension)

FT: 24–24 ET: 4–4, 3–6

== Final ranking and statistics ==
Qualified for the 2013 World Championship

Rank	Team
1st place, gold medalist(s)	Montenegro
2nd place, silver medalist(s)	Norway
3rd place, bronze medalist(s)	Hungary
4	Serbia
5	Denmark
6	Russia
7	Germany
8	Sweden
9	France
10	Romania
11	Spain
12	Czech Republic
13	Croatia
14	Ukraine
15	Iceland
16	Macedonia

=== All-Star Team ===
Position	Player
Goalkeeper	Katrine Lunde (NOR)
Right wing	Jovanka Radičević (MNE)
Right back	Katarina Bulatović (MNE)
Centre back	Andrea Lekić (SRB)
Left back	Sanja Damnjanović (SRB)
Left wing	Polina Kuznetsova (RUS)
Pivot	Heidi Løke (NOR)
Best defense player	Anja Althaus (GER)
Most valuable player	Anja Edin (NOR)

=== Top goalscorers ===
Rank	Name	Team	Goals	Shots	%
1	Katarina Bulatović	Montenegro	56	119	47%
2	Anita Görbicz	Hungary	41	70	59%
2	Milena Knežević	Montenegro	41	87	47%
4	Jovanka Radičević	Montenegro	40	61	66%
5	Linn Jørum Sulland	Norway	39	76	51%
6	Ann Grete Nørgaard	Denmark	37	51	73%
6	Zsuzsanna Tomori	Hungary	37	66	56%
8	Anja Edin	Norway	34	61	56%
9	Isabelle Gulldén	Sweden	33	56	59%
9	Andrea Lekić	Serbia	33	57	58%
9	Laura Steinbach	Germany	33	56	59%

Source: SportResult.com Archived 2020-08-18 at the Wayback Machine

=== Top goalkeepers ===
Rank	Name	Team	%	Saves	Shots
1	Katja Schülke	Germany	41%	45	111
2	Katrine Lunde Haraldsen	Norway	40%	99	247
3	Talida Tolnai	Romania	38%	41	108
4	Linda Pradel	France	37%	22	59
5	Katarina Tomašević	Serbia	36%	98	275
6	Cecilia Grubbström	Sweden	35%	61	174
6	Éva Kiss	Hungary	35%	34	97
6	Barbora Raníková	Czech Republic	35%	77	221
6	Paula Ungureanu	Romania	35%	38	109
6	Marina Vukčević	Montenegro	35%	34	97
6	Clara Woltering	Germany	35%	36	102

Source: SportResult.com Archived 2013-06-15 at the Wayback Machine
