= 2015–16 Copa de la Reina de Balonmano =

XXXVII Copa de la Reina

Tournament details
- Venue(s): Pavillón Polideportivo de Porriño (in O Porriño host cities)
- Dates: 21–22 November (1st round); 20 February (2nd round); 15–17 April (Final8)
- Teams: 12 (1st round); 12 (2nd round); 7 (Final8)

Final positions
- Champions: Bera Bera (5th title)
- Runner-up: Prosetecnisa Zuazo

Tournament statistics
- Matches played: 7
- Goals scored: 328 (46.86 per match)

The 2015–16 Copa de la Reina de Balonmano was the 37th edition of the Copa de la Reina de Balonmano. The tournament began in November 2015 with First round matches, following Second round to finish with the Final8.

The Final8 took place in O Porriño, Galicia, from 15 to 17 April. The matches will be played at Pavillón Polideportivo de Porriño, with 2,500 capacity seating. It was hosted by Federación Galega de Balonmán, Xunta de Galicia, O Porriño concello & RFEBM. O Porriño hosted Copa de la Reina for the last time in 2013.

Bera Bera won its fifth title after defeating newcomer's Prosetecnisa Zuazo in the Final 33–17.

== Calendar ==
Round	Date	Fixtures	Clubs	Notes
First round	21–22 November 2015	6	12 → 6	6 top teams from 2014–15 División de Plata + 6 bottom teams from 2014–15 División de Honor gain entry.
Second round	20 February 2016	6	12 → 6	6 top teams from 2014–15 División de Honor's teams gain entry.
Final8	15–17 April 2016	7	8 → 1	Rocasa G.C. ACE (defending champions) and BM Porriño (host team) gain entry.

== First round ==
Team 1	Score	Team 2
Grucal Adesal (Andalusia)	32–33 (a.e.t.)	(Basque Country (autonomous community)) Aiala Zarautz
Tejina Tenerife (Canary Islands)	21–22	(Asturias) Jofemesa Oviedo
Castellón (Valencian Community)	29–32	(Andalusia) Clínicas Rincón Málaga
Vivelafruta.com Castelldefels (Catalonia)	19–30	(Catalonia) KH-7 Granollers
Sporting La Rioja	17–16	(Castile and León) Carobels ULE-Cleba
Mavi Nuevas Tecnologias LC (Asturias)	30–21	(Valencian Community) Canyamelar Valencia

Teams qualified to Second Round
Aiala Zarautz	Jofemesa Oviedo	Clínicas Rincón Málaga
KH-7 Granollers	Sporting La Rioja	Mavi Nuevas Tecnologias LC

== Second round ==
Team 1	Score	Team 2
Sporting La Rioja	23–19	(Valencian Community) Elche Mustang
KH-7 Granollers (Catalonia)	20–29	(Community of Madrid) Helvetia Alcobendas
Mavi Nuevas Tecnologias LC (Asturias)	24–28	(Basque Country (autonomous community)) Prosetecnisa Zuazo
Aiala Zarautz (Basque Country (autonomous community))	13–23	(Basque Country (autonomous community)) Bera Bera
Jofemesa Oviedo (Asturias)	17–19	(Galicia (Spain)) Mecalia Atl. Guardés
Clínicas Rincón Málaga (Andalusia)	29–25	(Castile and León) Aula Valladolid

Teams qualified to Final8
Sporting La Rioja	Helvetia Alcobendas	Prosetecnisa Zuazo
Bera Bera	Mecalia Atl. Guardés	Clínicas Rincón Málaga

== Final eight ==
=== Venue ===
O Porriño within Spain

Pavillón Polideportivo de Porriño
Capacity: 2,500
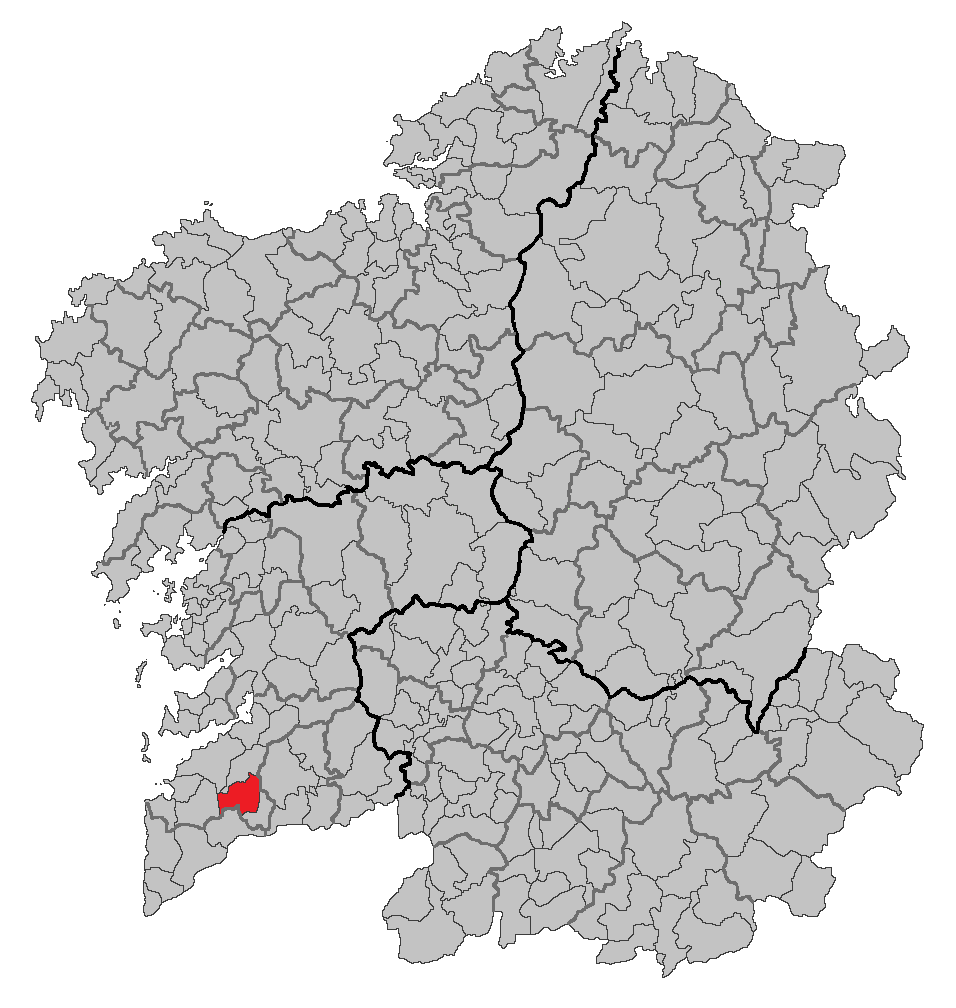
O Porriño

Quarter-finals
Clínicas Rincón Málaga	23
Prosetecnisa Zuazo	34
Rocasa G.C. ACE	24
Porriño	29
Sporting La Rioja	15
Mecalia Atl. Guardés	28
Helvetia Alcobendas	23
Bera Bera	27

Semi-finals
Prosetecnisa Zuazo	22
Porriño	21
Mecalia Atl. Guardés	13
Bera Bera	19

Final
Prosetecnisa Zuazo	17
Bera Bera	33

=== Matches ===
==== Quarter-finals ====
15 April; 12:30 (UTC+2)	Sporting La Rioja	15–28	Mecalia Atl. Guardés	Pavillón Polideportivo, O Porriño; Attendance: 700; Referees: Ballano Dueñas, Rodríguez Rodríguez
15 April; 12:30 (UTC+2)	Kurchankova 8	(10–10)	González 5	Pavillón Polideportivo, O Porriño; Attendance: 700; Referees: Ballano Dueñas, Rodríguez Rodríguez
15 April; 12:30 (UTC+2)	3× (yellow card) 1× (suspension)	Report	3× (yellow card) 4× (suspension)	Pavillón Polideportivo, O Porriño; Attendance: 700; Referees: Ballano Dueñas, Rodríguez Rodríguez

15 April; 16:00 (UTC+2)	Helvetia Alcobendas	23–27	Bera Bera	Pavillón Polideportivo, O Porriño; Attendance: 700; Referees: García Serradilla, Marín Lorente
15 April; 16:00 (UTC+2)	Francés 8	(13–13)	Pinedo, Martínez 6	Pavillón Polideportivo, O Porriño; Attendance: 700; Referees: García Serradilla, Marín Lorente
15 April; 16:00 (UTC+2)	3× (yellow card)	Report	2× (yellow card) 2× (suspension)	Pavillón Polideportivo, O Porriño; Attendance: 700; Referees: García Serradilla, Marín Lorente

15 April; 18:00 (UTC+2)	Clínicas Rincón Málaga	23–34	Prosetecnisa Zuazo	Pavillón Polideportivo, O Porriño; Attendance: 1,100; Referees: García Mosquera, Muro San José
15 April; 18:00 (UTC+2)	Karsten, 6	(11–15)	Steinbach 9	Pavillón Polideportivo, O Porriño; Attendance: 1,100; Referees: García Mosquera, Muro San José
15 April; 18:00 (UTC+2)	4× (yellow card) 5× (suspension)	Report	2× (yellow card) 5× (suspension)	Pavillón Polideportivo, O Porriño; Attendance: 1,100; Referees: García Mosquera, Muro San José

15 April; 20:00 (UTC+2)	Rocasa G.C. ACE	24–29	Porriño	Pavillón Polideportivo, O Porriño; Attendance: 2,500; Referees: Álvarez Mata, Bustamante López
15 April; 20:00 (UTC+2)	Rodríguez 8	(10–20)	Lopes 9	Pavillón Polideportivo, O Porriño; Attendance: 2,500; Referees: Álvarez Mata, Bustamante López
15 April; 20:00 (UTC+2)	3× (yellow card) 3× (suspension)	Report	3× (yellow card) 5× (suspension)	Pavillón Polideportivo, O Porriño; Attendance: 2,500; Referees: Álvarez Mata, Bustamante López

==== Semifinals ====
16 April; 16:30 (UTC+2)	Mecalia Atl. Guardés	13–19	Bera Bera	Pavillón Polideportivo, O Porriño; Attendance: 2,500; Referees: Álvarez Mata, Bustamante López
16 April; 16:30 (UTC+2)	Rodríguez 5	(8–6)	Pinedo, 6	Pavillón Polideportivo, O Porriño; Attendance: 2,500; Referees: Álvarez Mata, Bustamante López
16 April; 16:30 (UTC+2)	3× (yellow card) 2× (suspension)	Report^{[usurped]}	3× (yellow card) 2× (suspension)	Pavillón Polideportivo, O Porriño; Attendance: 2,500; Referees: Álvarez Mata, Bustamante López

16 April; 18:45 (UTC+2)	Prosetecnisa Zuazo	22–21	Porriño	Pavillón Polideportivo, O Porriño; Attendance: 2,500; Referees: García Serradilla, Marín Llorente
16 April; 18:45 (UTC+2)	Steinbach 11	(10–13)	Sanmartín 5	Pavillón Polideportivo, O Porriño; Attendance: 2,500; Referees: García Serradilla, Marín Llorente
16 April; 18:45 (UTC+2)	2× (yellow card) 3× (suspension)	Report	3× (yellow card) 5× (suspension)	Pavillón Polideportivo, O Porriño; Attendance: 2,500; Referees: García Serradilla, Marín Llorente

==== Final ====
17 April; 13:00 (UTC+2)	Prosetecnisa Zuazo	17–33	Bera Bera	Pavillón Polideportivo, O Porriño; Attendance: 1,300; Referees: Álvarez Mata, Bustamante López
17 April; 13:00 (UTC+2)	Steinbach 8	(10–17)	Martínez 7	Pavillón Polideportivo, O Porriño; Attendance: 1,300; Referees: Álvarez Mata, Bustamante López
17 April; 13:00 (UTC+2)	2× (suspension)	Report	3× (yellow card) 1× (suspension)	Pavillón Polideportivo, O Porriño; Attendance: 1,300; Referees: Álvarez Mata, Bustamante López

2015–16 Copa de la Reina de Balonmano winners
(Basque Country (autonomous community))
Bera Bera
Fifth title

== Top goalscorers (Final8) ==
Rank	Name	Team	Goals
1	(Germany) Laura Steinbach	Prosetecnisa Zuazo	28
2	(Spain) Ana Isabel Martínez	BM Bera Bera	17
3	(Spain) Elisabeth Pinedo	BM Bera Bera	13
4	(Portugal) Soraia Lopes	BM Porriño	13
5	(Spain) Haridian Rodríguez	Rocasa G.C. ACE	12

Source: own compilation

== See also ==
- 2015–16 División de Honor Femenina de Balonmano
