= 2024 European Women's Handball Championship =

2024 EHF European Women's Handball Championship
- Official logo

Tournament details
- Host countries: Austria; Hungary; Switzerland
- Venues: 4 (in 4 host cities)
- Dates: 28 November – 15 December
- Teams: 24 (from 1 confederation)

Final positions
- Champions: Norway (10th title)
- Runners-up: Denmark
- Third place: Hungary
- Fourth place: France

Tournament statistics
- Matches played: 65
- Goals scored: 3,495 (53.77 per match)
- Attendance: 183,821 (2,828 per match)
- Top scorers: (Hungary) Katrin Klujber (60 goals)

Awards
- Best player: (Denmark) Anna Kristensen

The 2024 European Women's Handball Championship was held in Austria, Hungary and Switzerland from 28 November to 15 December 2024. This was the first tournament to feature 24 teams. Norway were the two time defending champions and defended their title once again with a win over Denmark.

== Bidding processes ==
=== First bidding process ===
Originally, there were two bids for the EHF Women's Euro 2024.

- (North Macedonia) Macedonia
- Russia

On 5 September 2017, Russia's bid was the only bid left.

- Russia

However, later on, when the bids were announced for the 2022 and 2024 EHF Euros, Russia's bid was withdrawn and thus there were no applications left. On 20 June 2018, the day the host was supposed to be confirmed, the EHF voted to delay the awardment of the hosting rights.

Delay the vote
Delay the vote	Votes
Yes	37
No	5
Total	42

=== Second bidding process ===
In April 2019, the EHF reopened the bidding process. On 20 September 2019, there were 3 new bids.

- Austria, Hungary and Switzerland
- Czech Republic, Poland and Slovakia
- Russia

The host announcement took place on 25 January 2020 at the EHF Extraordinary Congress in Stockholm. The winners were Austria, Hungary and Switzerland, who defeated the Czech Republic, Poland and Slovakia bid, 28–21, in the second round.

Bids	Rounds	
Bids	Round one	Round two
Austria, Hungary and Switzerland	Advanced	28
Czech Republic, Poland and Slovakia	Advanced	21
Russia	Eliminated	–

=== Possible hosting change ===
On 12 January 2023, the Hungarian government's chancellery minister, Gergely Gulyás, announced that Hungary would withdraw as hosts due to financial reasons. A few days prior, the Austrian Handball Federation was informed by the Hungarians about the decision to withdraw. The other co-hosts, Austria and Switzerland, now wanted to negotiate with the EHF about how the tournament will be held. On 28 January, the European Handball Federation released a statement concerning the issue, and said that they were amazed and surprised with the decision to potentially withdraw as co-hosts. On 16 March 2023, the EHF announced a change to the organisation structure of the championships. Hungary remained as a co-host, but played a reduced part in the hosting of the competition, including the whole portion of the tournament at the MVM Dome in Budapest (one Main Round group and the Final Weekend) being axed and replaced by Vienna. During all the uncertainty, Romania had stated that they would be able to host the tournament if the original hosts could not.

== Venues ==
The final weekend was scheduled to be held at the MVM Dome in Budapest, Hungary, but later it was replaced with the Wiener Stadthalle in Vienna, Austria.

Innsbruck, Austria	2024 European Women's Handball Championship is located in Central Europe	Debrecen, Hungary
Olympiahalle; Capacity: 8,000	2024 European Women's Handball Championship is located in Central Europe	Főnix Aréna; Capacity: 4,163
Basel, Switzerland	2024 European Women's Handball Championship is located in Central Europe	Vienna, Austria
St. Jakobshalle; Capacity: 6,500	2024 European Women's Handball Championship is located in Central Europe	Wiener Stadthalle; Capacity: 8,785

== Expansion ==
Expanding the competition, to 20 or 24 teams, was first considered on 30 August 2018. The idea was proposed by the Euro Delegation, but the EHF competitions commission strongly opposed the proposal, due to the fact that:

- It would dilute the quality of the event
- Trying to find a host would be more difficult because of a bigger tournament
- Not many countries, who don't already qualify for the EHF Euro, would create a lasting legacy by qualifying

Despite the opposition from the competitions commission, the EHF received positive feedback from their new commercial partners, Infront and DAZN about the possible expansion. On 15 December, at the EHF Executive Committee in Paris, the EHF decided to examine to proposed expansion further. In January 2019, they had introduced a working group to oversee the possible enlargement. On 5 April 2019, based on the recommendations by the working group, the EHF officially decided to expand the tournament to 24 teams.

== Qualification ==
Map of qualifiers for the 2024 European Women's Handball Championship: Team qualified for Women's EHF Euro 2024 Team failed to qualify Team banned from competition Did not enter

31 teams registered for participation and competed for 20 places at the final tournament. Great Britain withdraw late which would have been the 32nd team. The teams were drawn into seven groups of four and one group with three teams. The top-two placed teams in each group qualified for the final tournament, alongside the four best-ranked third-placed teams, not counting the matches against fourth-placed teams. The qualifiers draw took place on 20 April 2023 in Zürich, Switzerland. Qualification started in October 2023 and ended in April 2024.

All 16 teams from the 2022 edition qualified, including North Macedonia who qualified for a major handball competition on merit for the first time since 2012. Debuting in the first 24 team championship are Faroe Islands and Turkey, with the former becoming the smallest nation ever to qualify for the finals.

Czech Republic return after missing the 2022 edition. The teams returning after long absences include co-hosts Austria (first time since 2008), Iceland (first time since 2012) plus Slovakia and Ukraine, who both return after last appearing at the Euro ten years ago in 2014. Portugal qualified for only their second ever major handball tournament after only participating at the 2008 European Women's Handball Championship.

Denmark were the first team to secure qualification after defeating Poland in February, while the Danes, Germany, Hungary and Norway all continue their flawless record of making every European Championship.

As of 2024, this was the last time Portugal qualified and the last time Greece failed to qualify.

=== Qualified teams ===
Country	Qualified as	Date qualification was secured	Previous appearances in tournament (Note: Bold indicates champion for that year. Italic indicates host for that year.)
Austria	Co-hosts	25 January 2020	8 (1994, 1996, 1998, 2000, 2002, 2004, 2006, 2008)
Hungary	Co-hosts	25 January 2020	15 (1994, 1996, 1998, **2000**, 2002, 2004, 2006, 2008, 2010, 2012, 2014, 2016, 2018, 2020, 2022)
Switzerland	Co-hosts	25 January 2020	1 (2022)
Norway	2022 champions	20 November 2022	15 (1994, 1996, **1998**, 2000, 2002, **2004**, **2006**, **2008**, **2010**, 2012, **2014**, **2016**, 2018, **2020**, **2022**)
Denmark	Group 8 top two	28 February 2024	15 (**1994**, **1996**, 1998, 2000, **2002**, 2004, 2006, 2008, 2010, 2012, 2014, 2016, 2018, 2020, 2022)
Sweden	Group 7 top two	2 March 2024	13 (1994, 1996, 2002, 2004, 2006, 2008, 2010, 2012, 2014, 2016, 2018, 2020, 2022)
Netherlands	Group 3 top two	3 March 2024	9 (1998, 2002, 2006, 2010, 2014, 2016, 2018, 2020, 2022)
Romania	Group 1 top two	3 March 2024	14 (1994, 1996, 1998, 2000, 2002, 2004, 2008, 2010, 2012, 2014, 2016, 2018, 2020, 2022)
France	Group 4 top two	3 March 2024	12 (2000, 2002, 2004, 2006, 2008, 2010, 2012, 2014, 2016, **2018**, 2020, 2022)
Spain	Group 5 top two	3 March 2024	12 (1998, 2002, 2004, 2006, 2008, 2010, 2012, 2014, 2016, 2018, 2020, 2022)
Montenegro	Group 6 top two	3 March 2024	7 (2010, **2012**, 2014, 2016, 2018, 2020, 2022)
Croatia	Group 1 top two	3 April 2024	12 (1994, 1996, 2004, 2006, 2008, 2010, 2012, 2014, 2016, 2018, 2020, 2022)
North Macedonia	Group 5 top two	3 April 2024	6 (1998, 2000, 2006, 2008, 2012, 2022)
Germany	Group 2 top two	4 April 2024	15 (1994, 1996, 1998, 2000, 2002, 2004, 2006, 2008, 2010, 2012, 2014, 2016, 2018, 2020, 2022)
Ukraine	Group 2 top two	7 April 2024	11 (1994, 1996, 1998, 2000, 2002, 2004, 2006, 2008, 2010, 2012, 2014)
Czech Republic	Group 3 top two	7 April 2024	7 (1994, 2002, 2004, 2012, 2016, 2018, 2020)
Slovenia	Group 4 top two	7 April 2024	8 (2002, 2004, 2006, 2010, 2016, 2018, 2020, 2022)
Serbia	Group 6 top two	7 April 2024	9 (2006, 2008, 2010, 2012, 2014, 2016, 2018, 2020, 2022)
Iceland	Group 7 top two	7 April 2024	2 (2010, 2012)
Poland	Group 8 top two	7 April 2024	8 (1996, 1998, 2006, 2014, 2016, 2018, 2020, 2022)
Turkey	One of four best third-ranked team	7 April 2024	0 (debut)
Slovakia	One of four best third-ranked team	7 April 2024	2 (1994, 2014)
Portugal	One of four best third-ranked team	7 April 2024	1 (2008)
Faroe Islands	One of four best third-ranked team	7 April 2024	0 (debut)

== Draw ==
The draw was held at 18:00 CEST on 18 April 2024 in Vienna, Austria. The guests for the draw were Norwegian goalkeeper Silje Solberg, Austrian goalkeeper Petra Blazek, Swiss goalkeeper Lea Schüpbach and right wing for the Hungarian national team Viktória Győri-Lukács. The draw started with the teams from pot one being drawn followed by pots two, three and four.

=== Seedings ===
The pots were announced on 8 April 2024.

Pot 1	Pot 2	Pot 3	Pot 4
Norway; Denmark; Montenegro (assigned to B1); France (assigned to C1); Sweden; Netherlands	Germany (assigned to F2); Spain; Romania; Hungary (assigned to A2); Switzerland (assigned to D2); Austria (assigned to E2)	Slovenia; Croatia; Poland; Serbia; North Macedonia; Iceland	Czech Republic; Ukraine; Turkey; Faroe Islands; Portugal; Slovakia

== Referees ==
18 referee pairs were selected on 2 July 2024. It was updated on 4 September 2024, when the Danish pair replaced the Turkish pair. It was updated a second time on 7 November 2024, when the Austrian pair was replaced by another Austrian pair and the Polish pair replaced the German pair.

Referees
Austria	Radojko Brkić; Andrei Jusufhodžić
Bosnia and Herzegovina	Vesna Balvan; Tatjana Praštalo
Bulgaria	Georgi Doychinov; Yulian Goretsov
Denmark	Line Hansen; Josefine Jensen
France	Yann Carmaux; Julien Mursch
Hungary	Kristóf Altmár; Márton Horváth
Italy	Gianna Merisi; Andrea Pepe
Lithuania	Tomas Barysas; Povilas Petrušis
Moldova	Igor Covalciuc; Alexei Covalciuc

Referees
Montenegro	Anđelina Kažanegra; Jelena Vujačić
Netherlands	William Weijmans; Rick Wolbertus
Norway	Eskil Braseth; Leif Sundet
Poland	Małgorzata Lidacka; Urszula Lesiak
Romania	Cristina Lovin; Simona Stancu
Serbia	Vanja Antić; Jelena Jakovljević
Slovenia	Ozren Backović; Mirko Palačković
Spain	Javier Álvarez; Ion Bustamante
Ukraine	Marina Duplii; Olena Pobedrina

== Preliminary round ==
All times are UTC+1.

=== Group A ===
Pos	Team	Pld	W	D	L	GF	GA	GD	Pts	Qualification
1	Hungary (H)	3	3	0	0	91	68	+23	6	Main round
2	Sweden	3	2	0	1	100	69	+31	4	Main round
3	North Macedonia	3	0	1	2	62	82	−20	1 (Note: North Macedonia 25–25 Turkey, North Macedonia group GD −20, Turkey group GD −34.)	
4	Turkey	3	0	1	2	68	102	−34	1	

Source: EHF
Rules for classification: 1) points; 2) head-to-head points; 3) head-to-head goal difference; 4) head-to-head number of goals scored; 5) goal difference; 6) goals scored.
(H) Hosts
Notes:

28 November 2024; 18:00	Hungary	30–24	Turkey	Főnix Aréna, Debrecen; Attendance: 2,927; Referees: Balvan, Praštalo (BIH)
28 November 2024; 18:00	Győri-Lukács, Klujber 6	(13–8)	İskit 5	Főnix Aréna, Debrecen; Attendance: 2,927; Referees: Balvan, Praštalo (BIH)
28 November 2024; 18:00	1× (yellow card)	Report	2× (suspension)	Főnix Aréna, Debrecen; Attendance: 2,927; Referees: Balvan, Praštalo (BIH)

28 November 2024; 20:30	Sweden	28–18	North Macedonia	Főnix Aréna, Debrecen; Attendance: 580; Referees: Duplii, Pobedrina (UKR)
28 November 2024; 20:30	Hagman 9	(15–7)	four players 3	Főnix Aréna, Debrecen; Attendance: 580; Referees: Duplii, Pobedrina (UKR)
28 November 2024; 20:30	2× (suspension)	Report	5× (suspension)	Főnix Aréna, Debrecen; Attendance: 580; Referees: Duplii, Pobedrina (UKR)

30 November 2024; 18:00	Sweden	25–32	Hungary	Főnix Aréna, Debrecen; Attendance: 4,163; Referees: Weijmans, Wolbertus (NED)
30 November 2024; 18:00	Carlson 6	(13–16)	Klujber 8	Főnix Aréna, Debrecen; Attendance: 4,163; Referees: Weijmans, Wolbertus (NED)
30 November 2024; 18:00	2× (suspension)	Report	5× (suspension)	Főnix Aréna, Debrecen; Attendance: 4,163; Referees: Weijmans, Wolbertus (NED)

30 November 2024; 20:30	North Macedonia	25–25	Turkey	Főnix Aréna, Debrecen; Attendance: 2,160; Referees: Braseth, Sundet (NOR)
30 November 2024; 20:30	Ristovska 8	(12–15)	Gökdemir 7	Főnix Aréna, Debrecen; Attendance: 2,160; Referees: Braseth, Sundet (NOR)
30 November 2024; 20:30	5× (suspension)	Report	3× (suspension)	Főnix Aréna, Debrecen; Attendance: 2,160; Referees: Braseth, Sundet (NOR)

2 December 2024; 18:00	North Macedonia	19–29	Hungary	Főnix Aréna, Debrecen; Attendance: 3,409; Referees: Hansen, Jensen (DEN)
2 December 2024; 18:00	Ristovska 6	(10–11)	Szöllősi-Schatzl 6	Főnix Aréna, Debrecen; Attendance: 3,409; Referees: Hansen, Jensen (DEN)
2 December 2024; 18:00	5× (suspension)	Report	4× (suspension)	Főnix Aréna, Debrecen; Attendance: 3,409; Referees: Hansen, Jensen (DEN)

2 December 2024; 20:30	Turkey	19–47	Sweden	Főnix Aréna, Debrecen; Attendance: 1,970; Referees: Brkić, Jusufhodžić (AUT)
2 December 2024; 20:30	three players 3	(12–25)	Hagman 11	Főnix Aréna, Debrecen; Attendance: 1,970; Referees: Brkić, Jusufhodžić (AUT)
2 December 2024; 20:30	3× (suspension) 1× (red card)	Report	4× (suspension)	Főnix Aréna, Debrecen; Attendance: 1,970; Referees: Brkić, Jusufhodžić (AUT)

=== Group B ===
Pos	Team	Pld	W	D	L	GF	GA	GD	Pts	Qualification
1	Montenegro	3	3	0	0	79	64	+15	6	Main round
2	Romania	3	2	0	1	81	80	+1	4	Main round
3	Czech Republic	3	1	0	2	76	81	−5	2	
4	Serbia	3	0	0	3	67	78	−11	0	

Source: EHF
Rules for classification: 1) points; 2) head-to-head points; 3) head-to-head goal difference; 4) head-to-head number of goals scored; 5) goal difference; 6) goals scored.

29 November 2024; 18:00	Romania	29–28	Czech Republic	Főnix Aréna, Debrecen; Attendance: 2,240; Referees: Brkić, Jusufhodžić (AUT)
29 November 2024; 18:00	Bazaliu 9	(11–13)	Cholevová 11	Főnix Aréna, Debrecen; Attendance: 2,240; Referees: Brkić, Jusufhodžić (AUT)
29 November 2024; 18:00	2× (suspension)	Report	1× (suspension)	Főnix Aréna, Debrecen; Attendance: 2,240; Referees: Brkić, Jusufhodžić (AUT)

29 November 2024; 20:30	Montenegro	24–18	Serbia	Főnix Aréna, Debrecen; Attendance: 2,036; Referees: A. Covalciuc, I. Covalciuc (MDA)
29 November 2024; 20:30	Jauković 11	(11–8)	Jovović 7	Főnix Aréna, Debrecen; Attendance: 2,036; Referees: A. Covalciuc, I. Covalciuc (MDA)
29 November 2024; 20:30	7× (suspension)	Report	2× (suspension)	Főnix Aréna, Debrecen; Attendance: 2,036; Referees: A. Covalciuc, I. Covalciuc (MDA)

1 December 2024; 18:00	Montenegro	27–25	Romania	Főnix Aréna, Debrecen; Attendance: 2,074; Referees: Backović, Palačković (SLO)
1 December 2024; 18:00	Mugoša 8	(16–12)	Seraficeanu 6	Főnix Aréna, Debrecen; Attendance: 2,074; Referees: Backović, Palačković (SLO)
1 December 2024; 18:00	1× (yellow card) 4× (suspension)	Report	2× (yellow card) 4× (suspension)	Főnix Aréna, Debrecen; Attendance: 2,074; Referees: Backović, Palačković (SLO)

1 December 2024; 20:30	Serbia	24–27	Czech Republic	Főnix Aréna, Debrecen; Attendance: 1,070; Referees: Barysas, Petrušis (LTU)
1 December 2024; 20:30	Janjušević 9	(13–14)	Cholevová, Jeřábková 8	Főnix Aréna, Debrecen; Attendance: 1,070; Referees: Barysas, Petrušis (LTU)
1 December 2024; 20:30	1× (yellow card) 1× (suspension)	Report	1× (yellow card) 3× (suspension)	Főnix Aréna, Debrecen; Attendance: 1,070; Referees: Barysas, Petrušis (LTU)

3 December 2024; 18:00	Serbia	25–27	Romania	Főnix Aréna, Debrecen; Attendance: 1,366; Referees: Braseth, Sundet (NOR)
3 December 2024; 18:00	Janjušević 7	(16–13)	Seraficeanu, Stoica 5	Főnix Aréna, Debrecen; Attendance: 1,366; Referees: Braseth, Sundet (NOR)
3 December 2024; 18:00	7× (suspension)	Report	1× (yellow card) 4× (suspension)	Főnix Aréna, Debrecen; Attendance: 1,366; Referees: Braseth, Sundet (NOR)

3 December 2024; 20:30	Czech Republic	21–28	Montenegro	Főnix Aréna, Debrecen; Attendance: 1,404; Referees: Weijmans, Wolbertus (NED)
3 December 2024; 20:30	A. Franková, Jeřábková 4	(4–12)	Jauković 8	Főnix Aréna, Debrecen; Attendance: 1,404; Referees: Weijmans, Wolbertus (NED)
3 December 2024; 20:30	1× (yellow card) 6× (suspension)	Report	5× (suspension) 1× (red card)	Főnix Aréna, Debrecen; Attendance: 1,404; Referees: Weijmans, Wolbertus (NED)

=== Group C ===
Pos	Team	Pld	W	D	L	GF	GA	GD	Pts	Qualification
1	France	3	3	0	0	87	60	+27	6	Main round
2	Poland	3	2	0	1	70	79	−9	4	Main round
3	Spain	3	1	0	2	75	74	+1	2	
4	Portugal	3	0	0	3	61	80	−19	0	

Source: EHF
Rules for classification: 1) points; 2) head-to-head points; 3) head-to-head goal difference; 4) head-to-head number of goals scored; 5) goal difference; 6) goals scored.

28 November 2024; 18:00	Spain	30–24	Portugal	St. Jakobshalle, Basel; Attendance: 2,669; Referees: Backović, Palačković (SLO)
28 November 2024; 18:00	Campos 8	(12–12)	Resende 8	St. Jakobshalle, Basel; Attendance: 2,669; Referees: Backović, Palačković (SLO)
28 November 2024; 18:00	2× (suspension)	Report	1× (yellow card) 3× (suspension)	St. Jakobshalle, Basel; Attendance: 2,669; Referees: Backović, Palačković (SLO)

28 November 2024; 20:30	France	35–22	Poland	St. Jakobshalle, Basel; Attendance: 2,682; Referees: Hansen, Jensen (DEN)
28 November 2024; 20:30	Coatanea 5	(18–10)	Uścinowicz 4	St. Jakobshalle, Basel; Attendance: 2,682; Referees: Hansen, Jensen (DEN)
28 November 2024; 20:30	1× (yellow card) 1× (suspension)	Report	1× (yellow card) 4× (suspension)	St. Jakobshalle, Basel; Attendance: 2,682; Referees: Hansen, Jensen (DEN)

30 November 2024; 15:30	Poland	22–21	Portugal	St. Jakobshalle, Basel; Attendance: 3,663; Referees: Doychinov, Goretsov (BUL)
30 November 2024; 15:30	Kobylińska 7	(11–10)	Lopes 5	St. Jakobshalle, Basel; Attendance: 3,663; Referees: Doychinov, Goretsov (BUL)
30 November 2024; 15:30	2× (yellow card) 4× (suspension)	Report	1× (yellow card) 6× (suspension)	St. Jakobshalle, Basel; Attendance: 3,663; Referees: Doychinov, Goretsov (BUL)

30 November 2024; 18:00	France	24–22	Spain	St. Jakobshalle, Basel; Attendance: 4,056; Referees: Merisi, Pepe (ITA)
30 November 2024; 18:00	Valentini 6	(10–11)	So Delgado 9	St. Jakobshalle, Basel; Attendance: 4,056; Referees: Merisi, Pepe (ITA)
30 November 2024; 18:00	1× (yellow card) 3× (suspension)	Report	1× (yellow card) 3× (suspension)	St. Jakobshalle, Basel; Attendance: 4,056; Referees: Merisi, Pepe (ITA)

2 December 2024; 18:00	Poland	26–23	Spain	St. Jakobshalle, Basel; Attendance: 1,425; Referees: A. Covalciuc, I. Covalciuc (MDA)
2 December 2024; 18:00	Rosiak 6	(14–12)	Erauskin, Vegué 6	St. Jakobshalle, Basel; Attendance: 1,425; Referees: A. Covalciuc, I. Covalciuc (MDA)
2 December 2024; 18:00	8× (suspension) 1× (red card)	Report	1× (suspension)	St. Jakobshalle, Basel; Attendance: 1,425; Referees: A. Covalciuc, I. Covalciuc (MDA)

2 December 2024; 20:30	Portugal	16–28	France	St. Jakobshalle, Basel; Attendance: 1,349; Referees: Duplii, Pobedrina (UKR)
2 December 2024; 20:30	Sequeira 4	(8–16)	Bouktit, Toublanc 5	St. Jakobshalle, Basel; Attendance: 1,349; Referees: Duplii, Pobedrina (UKR)
2 December 2024; 20:30	1× (suspension)	Report	2× (suspension)	St. Jakobshalle, Basel; Attendance: 1,349; Referees: Duplii, Pobedrina (UKR)

=== Group D ===
Pos	Team	Pld	W	D	L	GF	GA	GD	Pts	Qualification
1	Denmark	3	3	0	0	102	80	+22	6	Main round
2	Switzerland (H)	3	2	0	1	84	82	+2	4	Main round
3	Faroe Islands	3	0	1	2	66	78	−12	1 (Note: Croatia 17–17 Faroe Islands, Faroe Islands group GF 66, Croatia GF 65.)	
4	Croatia	3	0	1	2	65	77	−12	1	

Source: EHF
Rules for classification: 1) points; 2) head-to-head points; 3) head-to-head goal difference; 4) head-to-head number of goals scored; 5) goal difference; 6) goals scored.
(H) Hosts
Notes:

29 November 2024; 18:00	Switzerland	28–25	Faroe Islands	St. Jakobshalle, Basel; Attendance: 4,670; Referees: Barysas, Petrušis (LTU)
29 November 2024; 18:00	Gautschi 8	(13–7)	Brandenborg, Mittún 7	St. Jakobshalle, Basel; Attendance: 4,670; Referees: Barysas, Petrušis (LTU)
29 November 2024; 18:00	2× (suspension)	Report	4× (suspension)	St. Jakobshalle, Basel; Attendance: 4,670; Referees: Barysas, Petrušis (LTU)

29 November 2024; 20:30	Denmark	34–26	Croatia	St. Jakobshalle, Basel; Attendance: 4,538; Referees: Lesiak, Lidacka (POL)
29 November 2024; 20:30	Møller 7	(16–13)	Pavlović 6	St. Jakobshalle, Basel; Attendance: 4,538; Referees: Lesiak, Lidacka (POL)
29 November 2024; 20:30	5× (suspension)	Report	4× (suspension)	St. Jakobshalle, Basel; Attendance: 4,538; Referees: Lesiak, Lidacka (POL)

1 December 2024; 15:30	Croatia	17–17	Faroe Islands	St. Jakobshalle, Basel; Attendance: 4,855; Referees: Doychinov, Goretsov (BUL)
1 December 2024; 15:30	Ježić 5	(9–8)	Mittún, Samuelsen 5	St. Jakobshalle, Basel; Attendance: 4,855; Referees: Doychinov, Goretsov (BUL)
1 December 2024; 15:30	2× (yellow card) 3× (suspension)	Report	1× (suspension)	St. Jakobshalle, Basel; Attendance: 4,855; Referees: Doychinov, Goretsov (BUL)

1 December 2024; 18:00	Denmark	35–30	Switzerland	St. Jakobshalle, Basel; Attendance: 5,423; Referees: Merisi, Pepe (ITA)
1 December 2024; 18:00	Friis 9	(19–15)	Schmid 8	St. Jakobshalle, Basel; Attendance: 5,423; Referees: Merisi, Pepe (ITA)
1 December 2024; 18:00	1× (yellow card) 3× (suspension)	Report	1× (yellow card) 2× (suspension)	St. Jakobshalle, Basel; Attendance: 5,423; Referees: Merisi, Pepe (ITA)

3 December 2024; 18:00	Faroe Islands	24–33	Denmark	St. Jakobshalle, Basel; Attendance: 3,074; Referees: Altmár, Horváth (HUN)
3 December 2024; 18:00	Brandenborg 10	(8–15)	Østergaard 5	St. Jakobshalle, Basel; Attendance: 3,074; Referees: Altmár, Horváth (HUN)
3 December 2024; 18:00	1× (yellow card) 2× (suspension) 1× (red card)	Report	4× (suspension)	St. Jakobshalle, Basel; Attendance: 3,074; Referees: Altmár, Horváth (HUN)

3 December 2024; 20:30	Croatia	22–26	Switzerland	St. Jakobshalle, Basel; Attendance: 3,826; Referees: Carmaux, Mursch (FRA)
3 December 2024; 20:30	Barišić, Birtić 5	(10–16)	Baumann, Schmid 6	St. Jakobshalle, Basel; Attendance: 3,826; Referees: Carmaux, Mursch (FRA)
3 December 2024; 20:30	4× (suspension)	Report	1× (yellow card) 2× (suspension)	St. Jakobshalle, Basel; Attendance: 3,826; Referees: Carmaux, Mursch (FRA)

=== Group E ===
Pos	Team	Pld	W	D	L	GF	GA	GD	Pts	Qualification
1	Norway	3	3	0	0	109	65	+44	6	Main round
2	Slovenia	3	2	0	1	88	81	+7	4	Main round
3	Austria (H)	3	1	0	2	85	87	−2	2	
4	Slovakia	3	0	0	3	63	112	−49	0	

Source: EHF
Rules for classification: 1) points; 2) head-to-head points; 3) head-to-head goal difference; 4) head-to-head number of goals scored; 5) goal difference; 6) goals scored.
(H) Hosts

28 November 2024; 18:00	Austria	37–24	Slovakia	Olympiahalle, Innsbruck; Attendance: 2,414; Referees: Lovin, Stancu (ROU)
28 November 2024; 18:00	I. Ivančok, Reichert 8	(17–11)	Lancz 9	Olympiahalle, Innsbruck; Attendance: 2,414; Referees: Lovin, Stancu (ROU)
28 November 2024; 18:00	6× (suspension)	Report	1× (suspension)	Olympiahalle, Innsbruck; Attendance: 2,414; Referees: Lovin, Stancu (ROU)

28 November 2024; 20:30	Norway	33–26	Slovenia	Olympiahalle, Innsbruck; Attendance: 1,524; Referees: Carmaux, Mursch (FRA)
28 November 2024; 20:30	Reistad 9	(16–11)	Stanko 7	Olympiahalle, Innsbruck; Attendance: 1,524; Referees: Carmaux, Mursch (FRA)
28 November 2024; 20:30	1× (yellow card) 4× (suspension)	Report	4× (suspension)	Olympiahalle, Innsbruck; Attendance: 1,524; Referees: Carmaux, Mursch (FRA)

30 November 2024; 18:00	Norway	38–24	Austria	Olympiahalle, Innsbruck; Attendance: 3,730; Referees: Kažanegra, Vujačić (MNE)
30 November 2024; 18:00	Breistøl 6	(23–14)	three players 4	Olympiahalle, Innsbruck; Attendance: 3,730; Referees: Kažanegra, Vujačić (MNE)
30 November 2024; 18:00	4× (suspension)	Report	2× (suspension)	Olympiahalle, Innsbruck; Attendance: 3,730; Referees: Kažanegra, Vujačić (MNE)

30 November 2024; 20:30	Slovenia	37–24	Slovakia	Olympiahalle, Innsbruck; Attendance: 1,766; Referees: Antić, Jakovljević (SRB)
30 November 2024; 20:30	Stanko 9	(18–10)	Šutranová 11	Olympiahalle, Innsbruck; Attendance: 1,766; Referees: Antić, Jakovljević (SRB)
30 November 2024; 20:30	8× (suspension)	Report	7× (suspension)	Olympiahalle, Innsbruck; Attendance: 1,766; Referees: Antić, Jakovljević (SRB)

2 December 2024; 18:00	Slovenia	25–24	Austria	Olympiahalle, Innsbruck; Attendance: 3,341; Referees: Álvarez, Bustamante (ESP)
2 December 2024; 18:00	Stanko 8	(13–13)	Reichert 9	Olympiahalle, Innsbruck; Attendance: 3,341; Referees: Álvarez, Bustamante (ESP)
2 December 2024; 18:00	1× (yellow card) 3× (suspension)	Report	1× (yellow card) 3× (suspension)	Olympiahalle, Innsbruck; Attendance: 3,341; Referees: Álvarez, Bustamante (ESP)

2 December 2024; 20:30	Slovakia	15–38	Norway	Olympiahalle, Innsbruck; Attendance: 1,560; Referees: Lesiak, Lidacka (POL)
2 December 2024; 20:30	Šutranová 5	(8–20)	Herrem 8	Olympiahalle, Innsbruck; Attendance: 1,560; Referees: Lesiak, Lidacka (POL)
2 December 2024; 20:30	1× (red card)	Report	3× (suspension)	Olympiahalle, Innsbruck; Attendance: 1,560; Referees: Lesiak, Lidacka (POL)

=== Group F ===
Pos	Team	Pld	W	D	L	GF	GA	GD	Pts	Qualification
1	Netherlands	3	3	0	0	99	70	+29	6	Main round
2	Germany	3	2	0	1	82	65	+17	4	Main round
3	Iceland	3	1	0	2	71	81	−10	2	
4	Ukraine	3	0	0	3	64	100	−36	0	

Source: EHF
Rules for classification: 1) points; 2) head-to-head points; 3) head-to-head goal difference; 4) head-to-head number of goals scored; 5) goal difference; 6) goals scored.

29 November 2024; 18:00	Netherlands	27–25	Iceland	Olympiahalle, Innsbruck; Attendance: 2,076; Referees: Altmár, Horváth (HUN)
29 November 2024; 18:00	three players 5	(12–12)	Albertsdóttir 8	Olympiahalle, Innsbruck; Attendance: 2,076; Referees: Altmár, Horváth (HUN)
29 November 2024; 18:00	5× (suspension)	Report	1× (yellow card) 2× (suspension)	Olympiahalle, Innsbruck; Attendance: 2,076; Referees: Altmár, Horváth (HUN)

29 November 2024; 20:30	Germany	30–17	Ukraine	Olympiahalle, Innsbruck; Attendance: 2,437; Referees: Antić, Jakovljević (SRB)
29 November 2024; 20:30	Grijseels 6	(15–9)	Gorilska 4	Olympiahalle, Innsbruck; Attendance: 2,437; Referees: Antić, Jakovljević (SRB)
29 November 2024; 20:30	1× (yellow card) 6× (suspension)	Report	5× (suspension)	Olympiahalle, Innsbruck; Attendance: 2,437; Referees: Antić, Jakovljević (SRB)

1 December 2024; 18:00	Netherlands	29–22	Germany	Olympiahalle, Innsbruck; Attendance: 2,437; Referees: Álvarez, Bustamante (ESP)
1 December 2024; 18:00	Housheer 7	(15–14)	Grijseels 5	Olympiahalle, Innsbruck; Attendance: 2,437; Referees: Álvarez, Bustamante (ESP)
1 December 2024; 18:00	1× (yellow card) 4× (suspension)	Report	1× (yellow card) 4× (suspension)	Olympiahalle, Innsbruck; Attendance: 2,437; Referees: Álvarez, Bustamante (ESP)

1 December 2024; 20:30	Iceland	27–24	Ukraine	Olympiahalle, Innsbruck; Attendance: 1,155; Referees: Lovin, Stancu (ROU)
1 December 2024; 20:30	Albertsdóttir 7	(16–9)	Smbatian 8	Olympiahalle, Innsbruck; Attendance: 1,155; Referees: Lovin, Stancu (ROU)
1 December 2024; 20:30	1× (yellow card) 6× (suspension)	Report	1× (yellow card) 6× (suspension)	Olympiahalle, Innsbruck; Attendance: 1,155; Referees: Lovin, Stancu (ROU)

3 December 2024; 18:00	Ukraine	23–43	Netherlands	Olympiahalle, Innsbruck; Attendance: 1,019; Referees: Kažanegra, Vujačić (MNE)
3 December 2024; 18:00	Smbatian 7	(12–24)	Dekker 9	Olympiahalle, Innsbruck; Attendance: 1,019; Referees: Kažanegra, Vujačić (MNE)
3 December 2024; 18:00	1× (yellow card) 4× (suspension)	Report	5× (suspension)	Olympiahalle, Innsbruck; Attendance: 1,019; Referees: Kažanegra, Vujačić (MNE)

3 December 2024; 20:30	Iceland	19–30	Germany	Olympiahalle, Innsbruck; Attendance: 2,056; Referees: Balvan, Praštalo (BIH)
3 December 2024; 20:30	Albertsdóttir 6	(10–14)	Engel 7	Olympiahalle, Innsbruck; Attendance: 2,056; Referees: Balvan, Praštalo (BIH)
3 December 2024; 20:30	2× (yellow card) 3× (suspension)	Report	2× (suspension)	Olympiahalle, Innsbruck; Attendance: 2,056; Referees: Balvan, Praštalo (BIH)

== Main round ==
Points and goals gained in the preliminary group against teams that advance will be transferred to the main round.

=== Group I ===
Pos	Team	Pld	W	D	L	GF	GA	GD	Pts	Qualification
1	France	5	5	0	0	157	124	+33	10	Semifinals
2	Hungary (H)	5	4	0	1	153	125	+28	8	Semifinals
3	Sweden	5	2	0	3	133	137	−4	4 (Note: Sweden 25–24 Montenegro.)	Fifth place game
4	Montenegro	5	2	0	3	124	135	−11	4	
5	Poland	5	1	0	4	125	153	−28	2 (Note: Romania 24–29 Poland.)	
6	Romania	5	1	0	4	128	146	−18	2	

Source: EHF
Rules for classification: 1) points; 2) head-to-head points; 3) head-to-head goal difference; 4) head-to-head number of goals scored; 5) goal difference; 6) goals scored.
(H) Hosts
Notes:

5 December 2024; 15:30	Sweden	33–25	Poland	Főnix Aréna, Debrecen; Attendance: 786; Referees: Antić, Jakovljević (SRB)
5 December 2024; 15:30	Hagman 9	(17–15)	Kobylińska 6	Főnix Aréna, Debrecen; Attendance: 786; Referees: Antić, Jakovljević (SRB)
5 December 2024; 15:30	4× (suspension)	Report	1× (yellow card) 6× (suspension) 1× (red card)	Főnix Aréna, Debrecen; Attendance: 786; Referees: Antić, Jakovljević (SRB)

5 December 2024; 18:00	France	30–25	Romania	Főnix Aréna, Debrecen; Attendance: 1,481; Referees: Hansen, Jensen (DEN)
5 December 2024; 18:00	Valentini 6	(12–9)	Bazaliu 6	Főnix Aréna, Debrecen; Attendance: 1,481; Referees: Hansen, Jensen (DEN)
5 December 2024; 18:00	7× (suspension)	Report	1× (yellow card) 5× (suspension)	Főnix Aréna, Debrecen; Attendance: 1,481; Referees: Hansen, Jensen (DEN)

5 December 2024; 20:30	Hungary	26–20	Montenegro	Főnix Aréna, Debrecen; Attendance: 2,067; Referees: Álvarez, Bustamante (ESP)
5 December 2024; 20:30	Klujber 6	(16–11)	Jauković 5	Főnix Aréna, Debrecen; Attendance: 2,067; Referees: Álvarez, Bustamante (ESP)
5 December 2024; 20:30	1× (yellow card) 3× (suspension)	Report	4× (suspension)	Főnix Aréna, Debrecen; Attendance: 2,067; Referees: Álvarez, Bustamante (ESP)

6 December 2024; 15:30	Sweden	23–25	Romania	Főnix Aréna, Debrecen; Attendance: 1,520; Referees: Weijmans, Wolbertus (NED)
6 December 2024; 15:30	Lindqvist 5	(8–12)	Bazaliu 8	Főnix Aréna, Debrecen; Attendance: 1,520; Referees: Weijmans, Wolbertus (NED)
6 December 2024; 15:30	2× (suspension)	Report	1× (suspension) 1× (red card)	Főnix Aréna, Debrecen; Attendance: 1,520; Referees: Weijmans, Wolbertus (NED)

6 December 2024; 18:00	France	31–23	Montenegro	Főnix Aréna, Debrecen; Attendance: 2,041; Referees: Braseth, Sundet (NOR)
6 December 2024; 18:00	Zaadi 7	(15–11)	Pavićević 6	Főnix Aréna, Debrecen; Attendance: 2,041; Referees: Braseth, Sundet (NOR)
6 December 2024; 18:00	1× (yellow card) 5× (suspension) 1× (red card)	Report	3× (suspension)	Főnix Aréna, Debrecen; Attendance: 2,041; Referees: Braseth, Sundet (NOR)

6 December 2024; 20:30	Hungary	31–21	Poland	Főnix Aréna, Debrecen; Attendance: 2,955; Referees: Brkić, Jusufhodžić (AUT)
6 December 2024; 20:30	Vámos 8	(17–9)	Rosiak 4	Főnix Aréna, Debrecen; Attendance: 2,955; Referees: Brkić, Jusufhodžić (AUT)
6 December 2024; 20:30	4× (suspension)	Report	5× (suspension)	Főnix Aréna, Debrecen; Attendance: 2,955; Referees: Brkić, Jusufhodžić (AUT)

8 December 2024; 15:30	Montenegro	30–28	Poland	Főnix Aréna, Debrecen; Attendance: 1,872; Referees: Hansen, Jensen (DEN)
8 December 2024; 15:30	Jauković 8	(14–14)	Kobylińska 6	Főnix Aréna, Debrecen; Attendance: 1,872; Referees: Hansen, Jensen (DEN)
8 December 2024; 15:30	8× (suspension) 1× (red card)	Report	1× (yellow card) 3× (suspension) 1× (red card)	Főnix Aréna, Debrecen; Attendance: 1,872; Referees: Hansen, Jensen (DEN)

8 December 2024; 18:00	Hungary	37–29	Romania	Főnix Aréna, Debrecen; Attendance: 4,163; Referees: Antić, Jakovljević (SRB)
8 December 2024; 18:00	Klujber 10	(20–15)	Ostase 6	Főnix Aréna, Debrecen; Attendance: 4,163; Referees: Antić, Jakovljević (SRB)
8 December 2024; 18:00	3× (suspension)	Report	4× (suspension) 1× (red card)	Főnix Aréna, Debrecen; Attendance: 4,163; Referees: Antić, Jakovljević (SRB)

8 December 2024; 20:30	Sweden	27–31	France	Főnix Aréna, Debrecen; Attendance: 1,679; Referees: Brkić, Jusufhodžić (AUT)
8 December 2024; 20:30	Axnér, Roberts 4	(13–19)	Horacek, Nze Minko 6	Főnix Aréna, Debrecen; Attendance: 1,679; Referees: Brkić, Jusufhodžić (AUT)
8 December 2024; 20:30	1× (yellow card) 4× (suspension)	Report	4× (suspension)	Főnix Aréna, Debrecen; Attendance: 1,679; Referees: Brkić, Jusufhodžić (AUT)

10 December 2024; 15:30	Romania	24–29	Poland	Főnix Aréna, Debrecen; Attendance: 1,273; Referees: Braseth, Sundet (NOR)
10 December 2024; 15:30	Grozav 7	(11–10)	Balsam, Nocuń 5	Főnix Aréna, Debrecen; Attendance: 1,273; Referees: Braseth, Sundet (NOR)
10 December 2024; 15:30	5× (suspension) 1× (red card)	Report	3× (suspension) 1× (red card)	Főnix Aréna, Debrecen; Attendance: 1,273; Referees: Braseth, Sundet (NOR)

10 December 2024; 18:00	Hungary	27–30	France	Főnix Aréna, Debrecen; Attendance: 3,639; Referees: Weijmans, Wolbertus (NED)
10 December 2024; 18:00	Klujber 9	(13–13)	Foppa, Valentini 5	Főnix Aréna, Debrecen; Attendance: 3,639; Referees: Weijmans, Wolbertus (NED)
10 December 2024; 18:00	1× (suspension)	Report	1× (yellow card) 3× (suspension)	Főnix Aréna, Debrecen; Attendance: 3,639; Referees: Weijmans, Wolbertus (NED)

10 December 2024; 20:30	Sweden	25–24	Montenegro	Főnix Aréna, Debrecen; Attendance: 1,569; Referees: Barysas, Petrušis (LTU)
10 December 2024; 20:30	Hagman 6	(14–14)	Jauković 9	Főnix Aréna, Debrecen; Attendance: 1,569; Referees: Barysas, Petrušis (LTU)
10 December 2024; 20:30	3× (suspension)	Report	3× (suspension)	Főnix Aréna, Debrecen; Attendance: 1,569; Referees: Barysas, Petrušis (LTU)

=== Group II ===
Pos	Team	Pld	W	D	L	GF	GA	GD	Pts	Qualification
1	Norway	5	5	0	0	163	122	+41	10	Semifinals
2	Denmark	5	4	0	1	152	131	+21	8	Semifinals
3	Netherlands	5	3	0	2	139	134	+5	6	Fifth place game
4	Germany	5	2	0	3	142	134	+8	4	
5	Slovenia	5	1	0	4	124	152	−28	2	
6	Switzerland (H)	5	0	0	5	135	182	−47	0	

Source: EHF
Rules for classification: 1) points; 2) head-to-head points; 3) head-to-head goal difference; 4) head-to-head number of goals scored; 5) goal difference; 6) goals scored.
(H) Hosts

5 December 2024; 15:30	Switzerland	27–36	Germany	Wiener Stadthalle, Vienna; Attendance: 2,182; Referees: A. Covalciuc, I. Covalciuc (MDA)
5 December 2024; 15:30	Schmid 8	(14–18)	Hauf 6	Wiener Stadthalle, Vienna; Attendance: 2,182; Referees: A. Covalciuc, I. Covalciuc (MDA)
5 December 2024; 15:30	1× (suspension)	Report	2× (suspension)	Wiener Stadthalle, Vienna; Attendance: 2,182; Referees: A. Covalciuc, I. Covalciuc (MDA)

5 December 2024; 18:00	Netherlands	26–22	Slovenia	Wiener Stadthalle, Vienna; Attendance: 2,234; Referees: Barysas, Petrušis (LTU)
5 December 2024; 18:00	Malestein 6	(14–10)	Stanko 7	Wiener Stadthalle, Vienna; Attendance: 2,234; Referees: Barysas, Petrušis (LTU)
5 December 2024; 18:00	1× (yellow card) 3× (suspension)	Report	4× (suspension)	Wiener Stadthalle, Vienna; Attendance: 2,234; Referees: Barysas, Petrušis (LTU)

5 December 2024; 20:30	Denmark	24–27	Norway	Wiener Stadthalle, Vienna; Attendance: 2,579; Referees: Kažanegra, Vujačić (MNE)
5 December 2024; 20:30	Aagot 6	(12–13)	Breistøl, Reistad 5	Wiener Stadthalle, Vienna; Attendance: 2,579; Referees: Kažanegra, Vujačić (MNE)
5 December 2024; 20:30	1× (yellow card) 4× (suspension)	Report	1× (yellow card) 2× (suspension)	Wiener Stadthalle, Vienna; Attendance: 2,579; Referees: Kažanegra, Vujačić (MNE)

7 December 2024; 15:30	Switzerland	25–34	Slovenia	Wiener Stadthalle, Vienna; Attendance: 2,612; Referees: Balvan, Praštalo (BIH)
7 December 2024; 15:30	Emmenegger, Schmid 5	(16–17)	A. Abina, Stanko 6	Wiener Stadthalle, Vienna; Attendance: 2,612; Referees: Balvan, Praštalo (BIH)
7 December 2024; 15:30	2× (suspension) 1× (red card)	Report	3× (suspension)	Wiener Stadthalle, Vienna; Attendance: 2,612; Referees: Balvan, Praštalo (BIH)

7 December 2024; 18:00	Denmark	30–22	Germany	Wiener Stadthalle, Vienna; Attendance: 4,025; Referees: Lovin, Stancu (ROU)
7 December 2024; 18:00	Hansen, Østergaard 6	(15–13)	Antl 4	Wiener Stadthalle, Vienna; Attendance: 4,025; Referees: Lovin, Stancu (ROU)
7 December 2024; 18:00	2× (suspension)	Report	2× (suspension)	Wiener Stadthalle, Vienna; Attendance: 4,025; Referees: Lovin, Stancu (ROU)

7 December 2024; 20:30	Netherlands	21–31	Norway	Wiener Stadthalle, Vienna; Attendance: 3,267; Referees: Carmaux, Mursch (FRA)
7 December 2024; 20:30	Nüsser 5	(9–15)	Herrem 6	Wiener Stadthalle, Vienna; Attendance: 3,267; Referees: Carmaux, Mursch (FRA)
7 December 2024; 20:30	2× (suspension)	Report	4× (suspension)	Wiener Stadthalle, Vienna; Attendance: 3,267; Referees: Carmaux, Mursch (FRA)

9 December 2024; 15:30	Switzerland	29–37	Netherlands	Wiener Stadthalle, Vienna; Attendance: 1,714; Referees: Kažanegra, Vujačić (MNE)
9 December 2024; 15:30	Gautschi 6	(17–24)	Sprengers 7	Wiener Stadthalle, Vienna; Attendance: 1,714; Referees: Kažanegra, Vujačić (MNE)
9 December 2024; 15:30	1× (red card)	Report	1× (yellow card) 2× (suspension) 1× (red card)	Wiener Stadthalle, Vienna; Attendance: 1,714; Referees: Kažanegra, Vujačić (MNE)

9 December 2024; 18:00	Norway	32–27	Germany	Wiener Stadthalle, Vienna; Attendance: 2,677; Referees: Balvan, Praštalo (BIH)
9 December 2024; 18:00	Reistad 9	(19–13)	four players 4	Wiener Stadthalle, Vienna; Attendance: 2,677; Referees: Balvan, Praštalo (BIH)
9 December 2024; 18:00	3× (suspension)	Report	2× (suspension)	Wiener Stadthalle, Vienna; Attendance: 2,677; Referees: Balvan, Praštalo (BIH)

9 December 2024; 20:30	Denmark	33–26	Slovenia	Wiener Stadthalle, Vienna; Attendance: 1,719; Referees: Álvarez, Bustamante (ESP)
9 December 2024; 20:30	Halilcevic 6	(17–15)	Stanko 8	Wiener Stadthalle, Vienna; Attendance: 1,719; Referees: Álvarez, Bustamante (ESP)
9 December 2024; 20:30	1× (yellow card) 4× (suspension)	Report	5× (suspension)	Wiener Stadthalle, Vienna; Attendance: 1,719; Referees: Álvarez, Bustamante (ESP)

11 December 2024; 15:30	Slovenia	16–35	Germany	Wiener Stadthalle, Vienna; Attendance: 1,836; Referees: Carmaux, Mursch (FRA)
11 December 2024; 15:30	three players 3	(11–17)	Lott 6	Wiener Stadthalle, Vienna; Attendance: 1,836; Referees: Carmaux, Mursch (FRA)
11 December 2024; 15:30	3× (suspension)	Report	5× (suspension)	Wiener Stadthalle, Vienna; Attendance: 1,836; Referees: Carmaux, Mursch (FRA)

11 December 2024; 18:00	Denmark	30–26	Netherlands	Wiener Stadthalle, Vienna; Attendance: 2,813; Referees: A. Covalciuc, I. Covalciuc (MDA)
11 December 2024; 18:00	Hansen 7	(15–13)	Housheer 10	Wiener Stadthalle, Vienna; Attendance: 2,813; Referees: A. Covalciuc, I. Covalciuc (MDA)
11 December 2024; 18:00	5× (suspension)	Report	1× (yellow card) 4× (suspension)	Wiener Stadthalle, Vienna; Attendance: 2,813; Referees: A. Covalciuc, I. Covalciuc (MDA)

11 December 2024; 20:30	Switzerland	24–40	Norway	Wiener Stadthalle, Vienna; Attendance: 1,521; Referees: Lovin, Stancu (ROU)
11 December 2024; 20:30	Schmid 7	(13–24)	Hovden, Solberg-Isaksen 5	Wiener Stadthalle, Vienna; Attendance: 1,521; Referees: Lovin, Stancu (ROU)
11 December 2024; 20:30	2× (suspension)	Report	1× (suspension)	Wiener Stadthalle, Vienna; Attendance: 1,521; Referees: Lovin, Stancu (ROU)

== Knockout stage ==
=== Bracket ===
Semi-finals
13 December
France	22
Denmark	24
13 December
Hungary	22
Norway	30

Final
15 December
Denmark	23
Norway	31
Third place
15 December
France	24
Hungary	25

=== Fifth place game ===
13 December 2024; 15:00	Sweden	33–32	Netherlands	Wiener Stadthalle, Vienna; Attendance: 3,132; Referees: Balvan, Praštalo (BIH)
13 December 2024; 15:00	Lindqvist, Roberts 8	(15–15)	Housheer 9	Wiener Stadthalle, Vienna; Attendance: 3,132; Referees: Balvan, Praštalo (BIH)
13 December 2024; 15:00	2× (suspension)	Report	1× (yellow card) 6× (suspension)	Wiener Stadthalle, Vienna; Attendance: 3,132; Referees: Balvan, Praštalo (BIH)

=== Semifinals ===
13 December 2024; 17:45	Hungary	22–30	Norway	Wiener Stadthalle, Vienna; Attendance: 8,017; Referees: Álvarez, Bustamante (ESP)
13 December 2024; 17:45	Klujber 5	(11–13)	Reistad 7	Wiener Stadthalle, Vienna; Attendance: 8,017; Referees: Álvarez, Bustamante (ESP)
13 December 2024; 17:45	4× (suspension)	Report	5× (suspension)	Wiener Stadthalle, Vienna; Attendance: 8,017; Referees: Álvarez, Bustamante (ESP)

13 December 2024; 20:30	France	22–24	Denmark	Wiener Stadthalle, Vienna; Attendance: 7,754; Referees: Lovin, Stancu (ROU)
13 December 2024; 20:30	Foppa 4	(11–13)	Hansen 7	Wiener Stadthalle, Vienna; Attendance: 7,754; Referees: Lovin, Stancu (ROU)
13 December 2024; 20:30	2× (suspension)	Report	1× (yellow card) 2× (suspension)	Wiener Stadthalle, Vienna; Attendance: 7,754; Referees: Lovin, Stancu (ROU)

=== Third place game ===
15 December 2024; 15:15	France	24–25	Hungary	Wiener Stadthalle, Vienna; Attendance: 8,775; Referees: A. Covalciuc, I. Covalciuc (MDA)
15 December 2024; 15:15	three players 4	(12–13)	Klujber 9	Wiener Stadthalle, Vienna; Attendance: 8,775; Referees: A. Covalciuc, I. Covalciuc (MDA)
15 December 2024; 15:15	3× (suspension)	Report	1× (yellow card) 1× (suspension)	Wiener Stadthalle, Vienna; Attendance: 8,775; Referees: A. Covalciuc, I. Covalciuc (MDA)

=== Final ===
15 December 2024; 18:00	Denmark	23–31	Norway	Wiener Stadthalle, Vienna; Attendance: 8,775; Referees: Antić, Jakovljević (SRB)
15 December 2024; 18:00	Hansen, Højlund 5	(12–13)	Reistad 8	Wiener Stadthalle, Vienna; Attendance: 8,775; Referees: Antić, Jakovljević (SRB)
15 December 2024; 18:00	5× (suspension) 1× (red card)	Report	1× (yellow card) 2× (suspension)	Wiener Stadthalle, Vienna; Attendance: 8,775; Referees: Antić, Jakovljević (SRB)

== Final ranking and awards ==
=== Final ranking ===
Qualified for the 2025 World Championship

Rank	Team
1st place, gold medalist(s)	Norway
2nd place, silver medalist(s)	Denmark
3rd place, bronze medalist(s)	Hungary
4	France
5	Sweden
6	Netherlands
7	Germany
8	Montenegro
9	Poland
10	Slovenia
11	Romania
12	Switzerland
13	Spain
14	Austria
15	Czech Republic
16	Iceland
17	Faroe Islands
18	North Macedonia
19	Croatia
20	Turkey
21	Serbia
22	Portugal
23	Ukraine
24	Slovakia

2024 Women's European Champions

Norway
Tenth title

Team roster: Anniken Obaidli, Maren Nyland Aardahl, Stine Skogrand, Live Rushfeldt Deila, Silje Solberg-Østhassel, Kari Brattset Dale, Kristine Breistøl, Katrine Lunde, Marit Røsberg Jacobsen, Ingvild Bakkerud, Camilla Herrem, Sanna Solberg-Isaksen, Henny Reistad, Emilie Hovden, Thale Rushfeldt Deila, Eli Marie Raasok, Ane Høgseth.
Head Coach: Þórir Hergeirsson.

=== All Star Team ===
The All Star Team and awards were announced on 15 December 2024.

Position	Player
Goalkeeper	(Denmark) Anna Kristensen
Left wing	(Denmark) Emma Friis
Left back	(Slovenia) Tjaša Stanko
Centre back	(Norway) Henny Reistad
Right back	(Hungary) Katrin Klujber
Right wing	(Hungary) Viktória Győri-Lukács
Pivot	(Montenegro) Tatjana Brnović
Best defense player	(France) Pauletta Foppa
Best young player	(Hungary) Petra Simon
Most valuable player	(Denmark) Anna Kristensen

== Statistics ==
=== Top goalscorers ===
Rank	Name	Goals	Shots	%
1	(Hungary) Katrin Klujber	60	103	58
2	(Norway) Henny Reistad	50	81	62
3	(Slovenia) Tjaša Stanko	48	75	64
4	(Montenegro) Đurđina Jauković	47	81	58
5	(Switzerland) Tabea Schmid	44	62	71
6	(Hungary) Viktória Győri-Lukács	42	60	70
6	(Sweden) Nathalie Hagman	42	60	70
8	(Denmark) Anne Mette Hansen	40	62	65
8	(Netherlands) Dione Housheer	40	67	60
10	(Sweden) Emma Lindqvist	37	55	67

=== Top goalkeepers ===
Rank	Name	%	Saves	Shots
1	(Faroe Islands) Annika Fríðheim Petersen	42	28	67
2	(Czech Republic) Sabrina Novotná	39	42	107
2	(Hungary) Zsófi Szemerey	39	73	189
4	(Denmark) Anna Kristensen	38	100	263
5	(France) Hatadou Sako	37	36	98
6	(Germany) Katharina Filter	36	54	151
6	(France) Laura Glauser	36	73	203
6	(Norway) Katrine Lunde	36	37	104
6	(Norway) Silje Solberg-Østhassel	36	63	174
10	(Denmark) Althea Reinhardt	35	26	75
10	(Netherlands) Yara ten Holte	35	68	196

== Marketing ==
The official logo was unveiled on 19 November 2022 at the closing press conference of the 2022 edition in Ljubljana, Slovenia.

The official ball for the 2024 European Championship come out on 7 April 2023, made by manufacturer and EHF partner, Select. The ball in made of faux leather and is decorated in contrasting red tones with green accents and white areas with the tournament's slogan "Catch the Spirit" on the ball as well.

The mascot was announced on 2 April 2024. The mascot is a wildcat.

=== Tickets ===
For the matches of the European Championship, tickets are offered by the EHF as a package with several matches as follows:

- Preliminary round, Group A in Debrecen (featuring Hungary): three days from 18,600 to 34,800 Ft
- Preliminary round, Group B in Debrecen: three days from 7,800 to 20,300 Ft
- Preliminary round, Groups C and D in Basel: three days from 105 to 875 Francs
- Preliminary round, Groups E and F in Innsbruck: three days from €78 to €159
- Main round Group I in Debrecen: four days from 32,000 to 57,200 Ft
- Main round, Group II in Vienna: four days from €104 to €248
- Final round in Vienna: two days from €74 to €169

=== Official song ===
The official song was unveiled on 15 April 2024. It is Live Is Life by Austrian band Opus which has been adapted to fit the tournament. The song was officially unveiled at the draw on 18 April 2024. Music video released 20 August 2024.
