= Hammerseng-Edin =

Hammerseng-Edin is a surname. Notable people with the surname include:

- Anja Hammerseng-Edin (born 1983), Norwegian handball player
- Gro Hammerseng-Edin (born 1980), Norwegian handball player
