= EHF Euro 2024 =

EHF Euro 2024 may refer to:

- 2024 European Men's Handball Championship
- 2024 European Women's Handball Championship
