= Viktória Soós =

Hungarian handball player (born 1985)

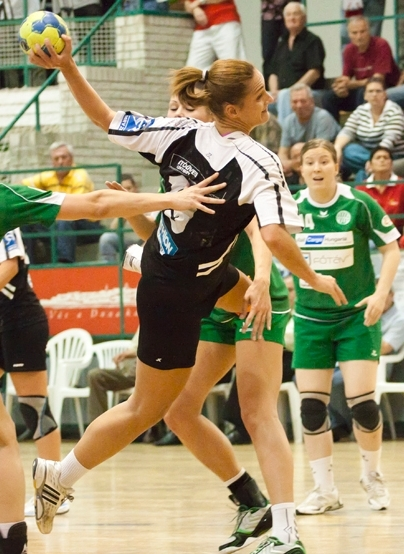
- Viktória Soós in 2011

Personal information
- Nationality: Hungarian
- Born: 28 July 1985 (age 41) Debrecen, Hungary
- Height: 176 cm (69 in)

Sport
- Sport: Handball
- Position: Right back
- Current club: Budaörs Handball

Senior clubs
- Years: Team
- 2002–2006: Debreceni VSC
- loan: → Hajdúnánás SC
- loan: → Hajdúnánás SC
- loan: → Túrkeve VSE
- 2006–2008: Ferencvárosi TC
- 2008–2009: Debrceni VSC
- 2009–2011: Váci NKSE
- 2011–2012: Hypo Niederösterreich
- 2012–2014: Győri ETO KC
- 2014–2015: Ferencvárosi TC
- 2015–2017: Váci NKSE
- 2018–2019: Budaörs Handball
National team
Years	Team	Apps	(Gls)
2011–2014	Hungary	37	(75)
Medal record
European Championship
Bronze medal – third place	2012 Serbia	Team

Viktória Soós (formerly Viktória Rédei-Soós; born 28 July 1985) is a retired Hungarian handballer.

She made her international debut on 23 April 2011 against the Netherlands. She retired from handball in June 2017, but returned in January 2019.

== Personal life ==
Her first husband was István Rédei, Hungarian handballer. Her second husband is Gergely Jáky-Szabó, their son is Gergő.

== Achievements ==
- Nemzeti Bajnokság I:
  - Winner: 2007, 2013, 2014, 2015
  - Bronze Medalist: 2008, 2009, 2010
- Magyar Kupa:
  - Winner: 2013, 2014
  - Finalist: 2009, 2015
- EHF Champions League:
  - Winner: 2013, 2014
- EHF Cup:
  - Semifinalist: 2006
- EHF Cup Winners' Cup:
  - Semifinalist: 2007, 2015
- European Championship:
  - Bronze Medalist: 2012
