= Zsófi Szemerey =

Hungarian handball player (born 1994)

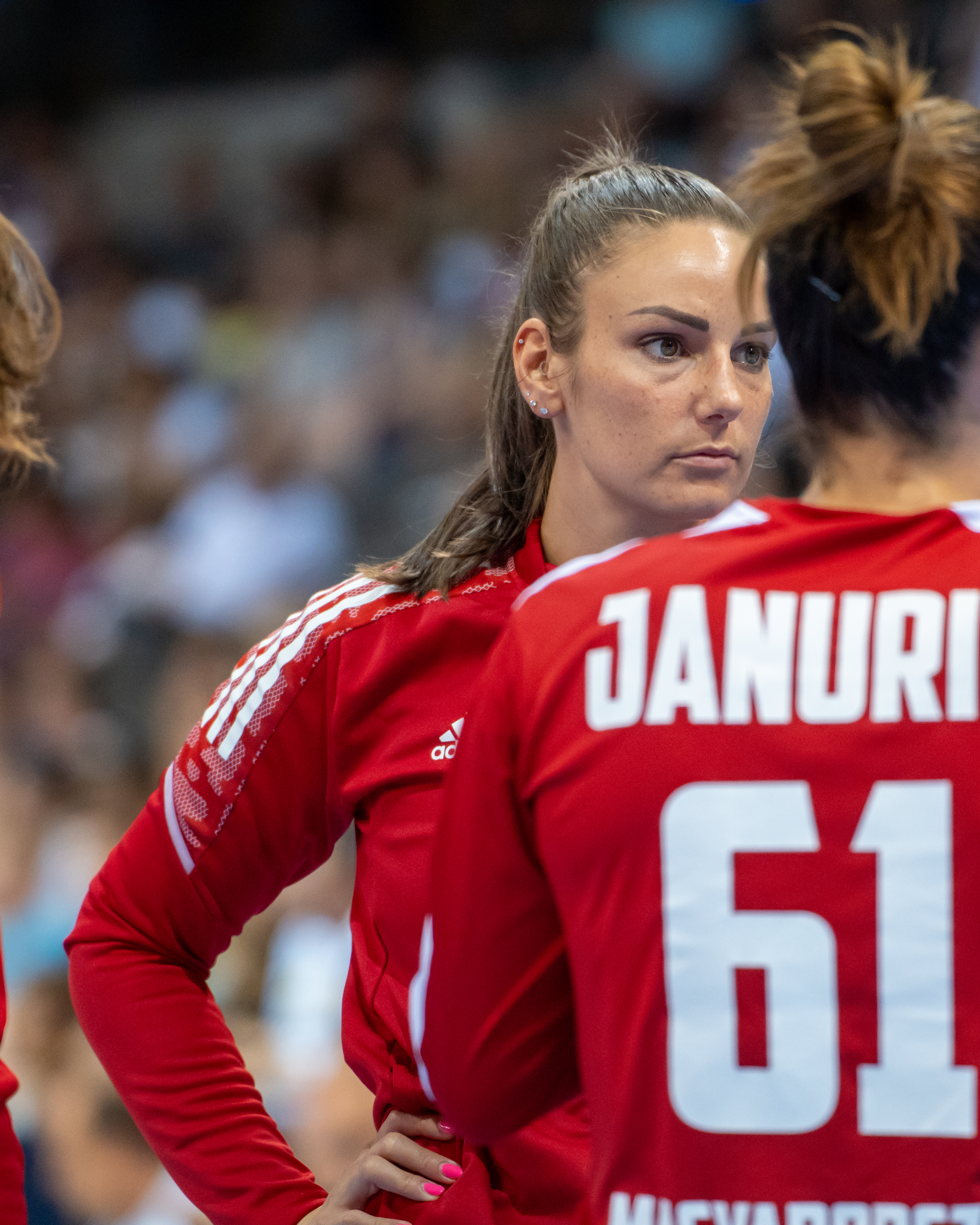

Personal information
- Full name: Zsófi Szemerey
- Nationality: Hungarian
- Born: 2 June 1994 (age 32) Kazincbarcika, Hungary
- Height: 1.83 m (6 ft 0 in)

Sport
- Sport: Handball
- Position: Goalkeeper
- Current club: Győri ETO KC
- Number: 31

Senior clubs
- Years: Team
- 2011–2013: Győri ETO KC
- 2013–2014: Veszprém BKC
- 2014–2017: Mosonmagyaróvári KC SE
- 2017–2018: Siófok KC
- 2018–2020: Ferencvárosi TC
- 2020–2024: Mosonmagyaróvári KC SE
- 2024–2025: Metz Handball
- 2025–: Győri ETO KC
National team
Years	Team	Apps	(Gls)
2021–	Hungary	50	(1)
Medal record
European Championship
Bronze medal – third place	2024 Austria/Hungary/Switzerland
Junior European Championship
Silver medal – second place	2013 Denmark
- Updated on 10 December 2025

Zsófi Szemerey (born 2 June 1994) is a Hungarian handball goalkeeper who plays for Győri ETO KC and the Hungarian national team.

She represented Hungary at two European Championship (2022, 2024), and two World Championship (2021, 2023) tournaments. She also participated in the Paris Summer Olympics in 2024, where the team finished 6th. At the 2024 European Championship she was part of the Hungarian team that won bronze medals, losing to Norway in semifinal and beating France in the third place play-off. This was the first Hungarian medals since 2012.

== Accomplishments ==
- French Championship:
  - Gold: 2025
- French Cup:
  - Gold: 2025
