= Sanja Rajović =

Serbian handball player (born 1981)

Personal information
- Full name: Sanja Rajović Belosevac
- Nationality: Serbian
- Born: 18 May 1981 (age 45) Aranđelovac, SFR Yugoslavia
- Height: 1.74 m (5 ft 9 in)

Sport
- Sport: Handball
- Position: Pivot
- Current club: ŽRK Izvor
- Number: 17
National team
Years	Team	Apps	(Gls)
–	Serbia	87	(123)
Medal record
World Championship
Silver medal – second place	2013 Serbia
Mediterranean Games
Gold medal – first place	2013 Mersin	Team

Sanja Rajović (born 18 May 1981) is a Serbian handballer who plays for the Croatian club ŽRK Izvor and the Serbian national team. Previously, she played for ŽRK Knjaz Miloš and ŽRK Kikinda. Rajović played for the Serbian national team at the 2012 European Handball Championship when the team finished 4th.
