= Helena Štěrbová =

Czech handball player

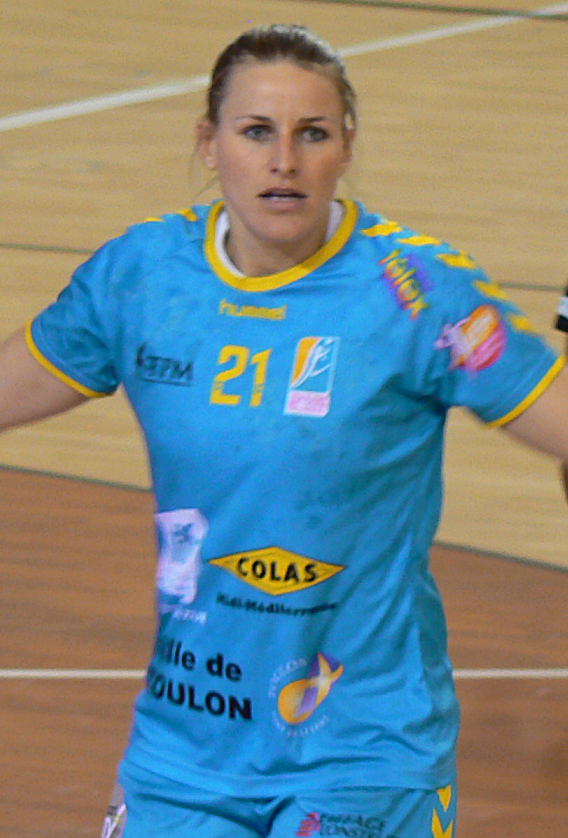
- Helena Štěrbová in 2014

Personal information
- Nationality: Czech
- Born: 5 April 1988 (age 38)
- Height: 1.80 m (5 ft 11 in)

Sport
- Sport: Handball
- Position: Left back
- Current club: Handball des Collines
National team
Years	Team	Apps	(Gls)
–	Czech Republic	66	(140)

Helena Štěrbová (born 5 April 1988) is a Czech handball player for Handball des Collines and the Czech national team.
