= Pavla Poznarová =

Czech handball player (born 1986)

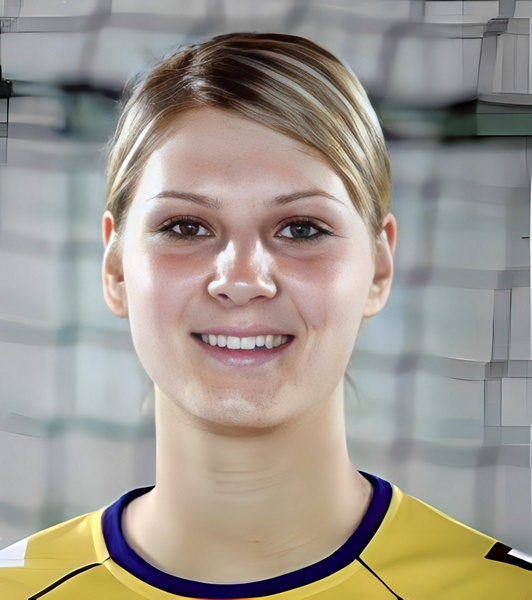
- Pavla Poznarová

Personal information
- Nationality: Czech
- Born: 26 September 1986 (age 40) Zlín, Czechoslovakia
- Height: 1.81 m (5 ft 11 in)

Sport
- Sport: Handball
- Position: Left back
- Current club: Sokol Poruba
- Number: 8
National team
Years	Team	Apps	(Gls)
–	Czech Republic	98	(202)

Pavla Poznarová (born 26 September 1986) is a Czech handballer player for Sokol Poruba and the Czech national team.
