= Barbora Raníková =

Czech handball player

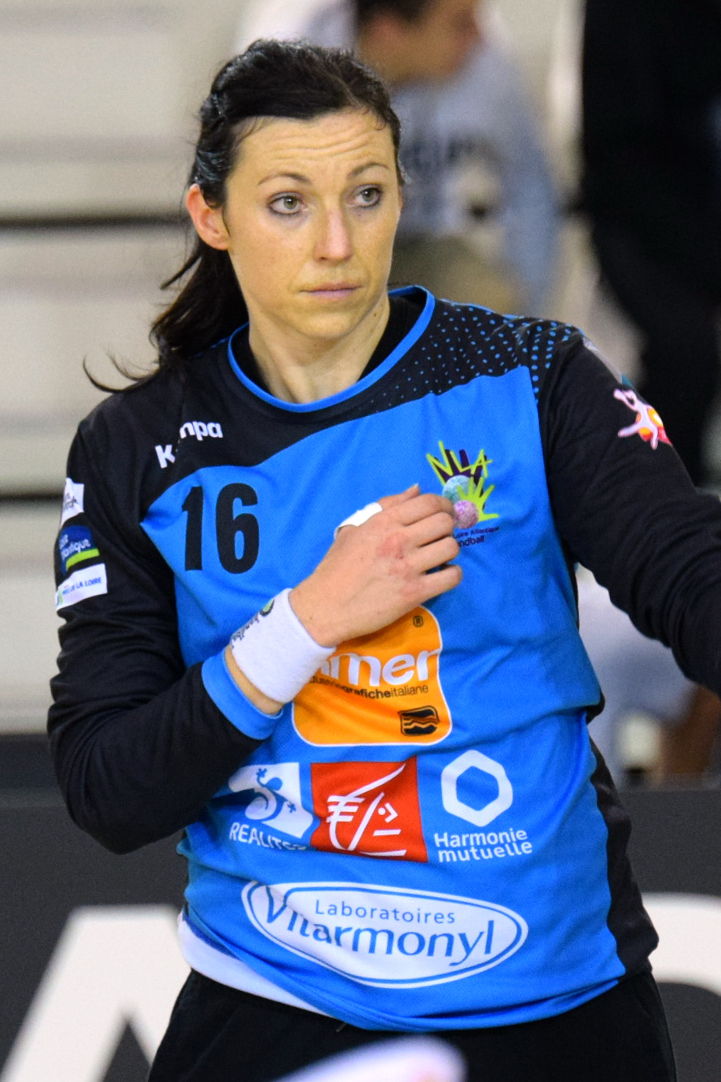

Personal information
- Nationality: Czech
- Born: 12 March 1985 (age 41) Písek, Czechoslovakia
- Height: 1.81 m (5 ft 11 in)

Sport
- Sport: Handball
- Position: Goalkeeper
- Current club: Metz Handball
- Number: 12
National team
Years	Team	Apps
–	Czech Republic	67

Barbora Raníková (born 12 March 1985) is a Czech European Handballer player for Metz Handball and the Czech national team.
