= Perla Ruth Albertsdóttir =

Icelandic handballer (born 1996)

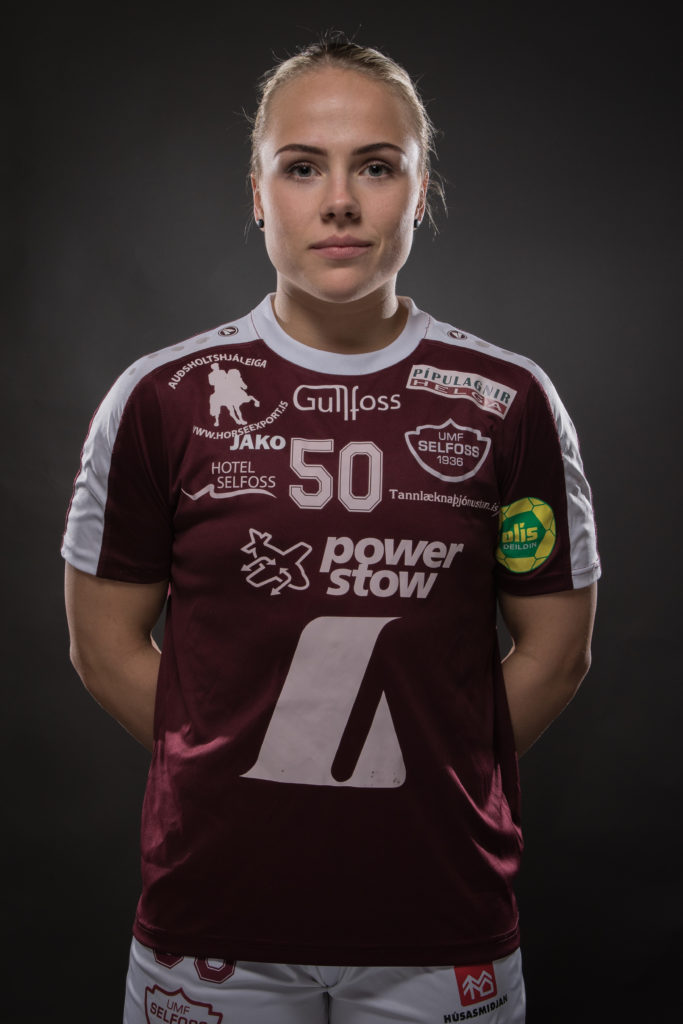

Personal information
- Nationality: Icelandic
- Born: 21 September 1996 (age 30) Selfoss, Iceland
- Height: 1.63 m (5 ft 4 in)

Sport
- Sport: Handball
- Position: Line Player
- Current club: Selfoss
- Number: 50

Senior clubs
- Years: Team
- 2014–2019: Selfoss
- 2019–2023: Fram
- 2023–: Selfoss
National team
Years	Team	Apps	(Gls)
2017–	Iceland	52	(110)
- Updated on 3. November 2024

Perla Ruth Albertsdóttir (born 21 September 1996) is an Icelandic handballer who plays for Icelandic top division side Selfoss and the Icelandic national team as a center back. Perla started playing handball at the age of 17 and within three years, she had been selected for the national team

In June 2019, Perla signed with Fram. Perla signed back with her hometown club Selfoss in June 2023.
