= Romana Chrenková =

Czech handball player

Personal information
- Nationality: Czech
- Born: 30 June 1987 (age 39) Frýdek-Místek, Czechoslovakia
- Height: 1.66 m (5 ft 5 in)

Sport
- Sport: Handball
- Position: Left wing
- Current club: HC Veselí
National team
Years	Team	Apps	(Gls)
–	Czech Republic	81	(296)

Romana Chrenková (born 30 June 1987) is a Czech handballer playing for HC Veselí and the Czech national team.
