= Anja Hammerseng-Edin =

Norwegian handball player (born 1983)

Anja Edin
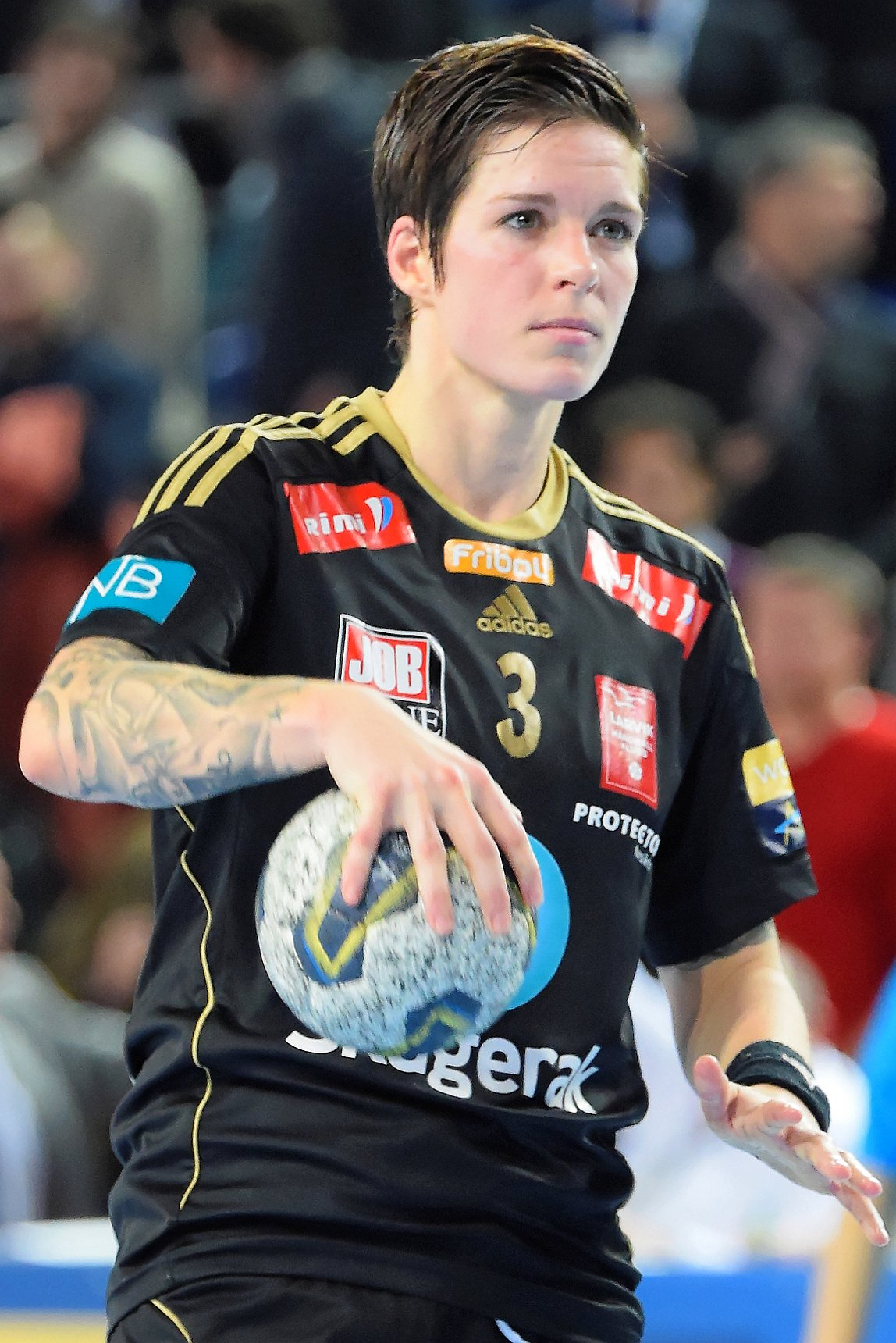

Personal information
- Full name: Anja Hammerseng-Edin
- Nationality: Norwegian
- Born: 5 February 1983 (age 43) Porsgrunn, Norway
- Height: 1.73 m (5 ft 8 in)

Sport
- Sport: Handball
- Position: Central back
- Current club: Retired

Senior clubs
- Years: Team
- 1999–2001: Herøya IF
- 2001–2002: Gjerpen IF
- 2002–2004: Sola HK
- 2004–2008: Gjerpen IF
- 2008–2012: Storhamar HE
- 2012–2017: Larvik HK
National team
Years	Team	Apps	(Gls)
2006–2013	Norway	59	(143)
Medal record
World Championship
Bronze medal – third place	2009 China	Team
European Championship
Silver medal – second place	2012 Serbia	Team

Anja Hammerseng-Edin (née Anja Marie Edin, 5 February 1983) is a Norwegian former handball player. She previously played for Larvik HK and for the Norwegian national team.

== Career ==
Hammerseng-Edin made her début on the Norwegian national team in 2006, and played 59 matches and scored 143 goals between 2006 and 2013. She represented Norway when the team won a bronze medal at the 2009 World Women's Handball Championship in China, as well as winning a silver medal at the 2012 European Women's Handball Championship in Serbia. She was also part of the National team at the 2013 World Women's Handball Championship.

She retired from her handball career in 2017, and currently works as a conference speaker.

== Individual awards ==
- MVP of the European Championship: 2012

== Personal life ==
Edin started playing handball when she was 5 years old, with her mother as a trainer.

She is married to fellow handball player Gro Hammerseng, and they have a son together, born on 2 February 2012. Hammerseng and Edin married on 3 August 2013. The couple both play for the Norwegian handball club Larvik HK.

Hammerseng-Edin and her wife wrote a book together titled Anja + Gro = Mio, which was published in February 2014.
