= Laura Steinbach =

German handball player (born 1985)

Laura Steinbach Romero
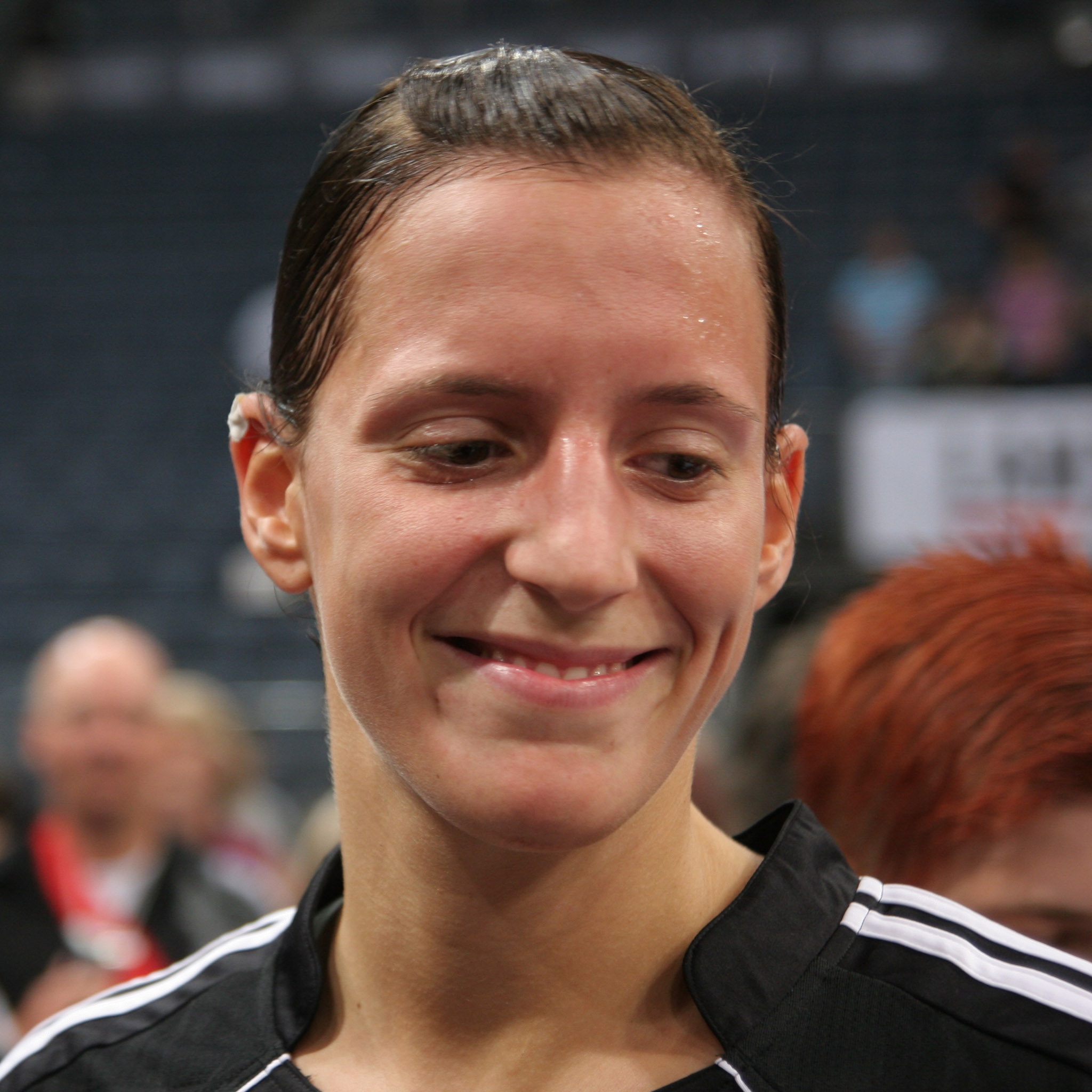

Personal information
- Nationality: German
- Born: 2 August 1985 (age 41) Homburg, West Germany
- Height: 1.81 m (5 ft 11 in)

Sport
- Sport: Handball
- Position: Left back

Senior clubs
- Years: Team
- 2000–2005: TuS Metzingen
- 2005–2007: DJK/MJC Trier
- 2007–2013: Bayer Leverkusen
- 2013–2014: Ferencvárosi TC
- 2014–2015: Spreefüxxe Berlin
- 2015–2016: Balonmano Zuazo
- 2016–2017: KH-7 BM Granollers
National team
Years	Team	Apps	(Gls)
2006–2017	Germany	116	(241)

Laura Steinbach-Romero (born 2 August 1985) is a former German handball player for the German national team. Since summer of 2016 she is married to former Spanish handball player Iker Romero.

== Career ==
She represented Germany at the 2008 Summer Olympic Games in Beijing, where Germany placed 11th. She participated in the 2009 World Women's Handball Championship in China.

In 2013, she was transferred from Bayer Leverkusen to Ferencváros Budapest.
