= Nurceren Akgün =

Turkish handball player

- Nurceren Akgün in 2026

Personal information
- Full name: Nurceren Akgün Göktepe
- Born: 20 June 1992 (age 34) Antalya, Turkey
- Height: 1.81 m (5 ft 11 in)

Sport
- Sport: Handball
- Position: Line Player
- Current club: Yalıkavak
- Number: 14

Senior clubs
- Years: Team
- 2010–2015: Muratpaşa Bld. SK
- 2015–2021: Yenimahalle Bld. SK
- 2021: A.B.B. EGO SK
- 2021–2023: Kastamonu Bld. GSK
- 2023–2024: Yenimahalle Bld. SK
- 2024–: Yalıkavak
National team
- Years: Team
- 2014–: Turkey
Medal record
Women's Handball
Representing Turkey
Islamic Solidarity Games
Silver medal – second place	2017 Baku	Team

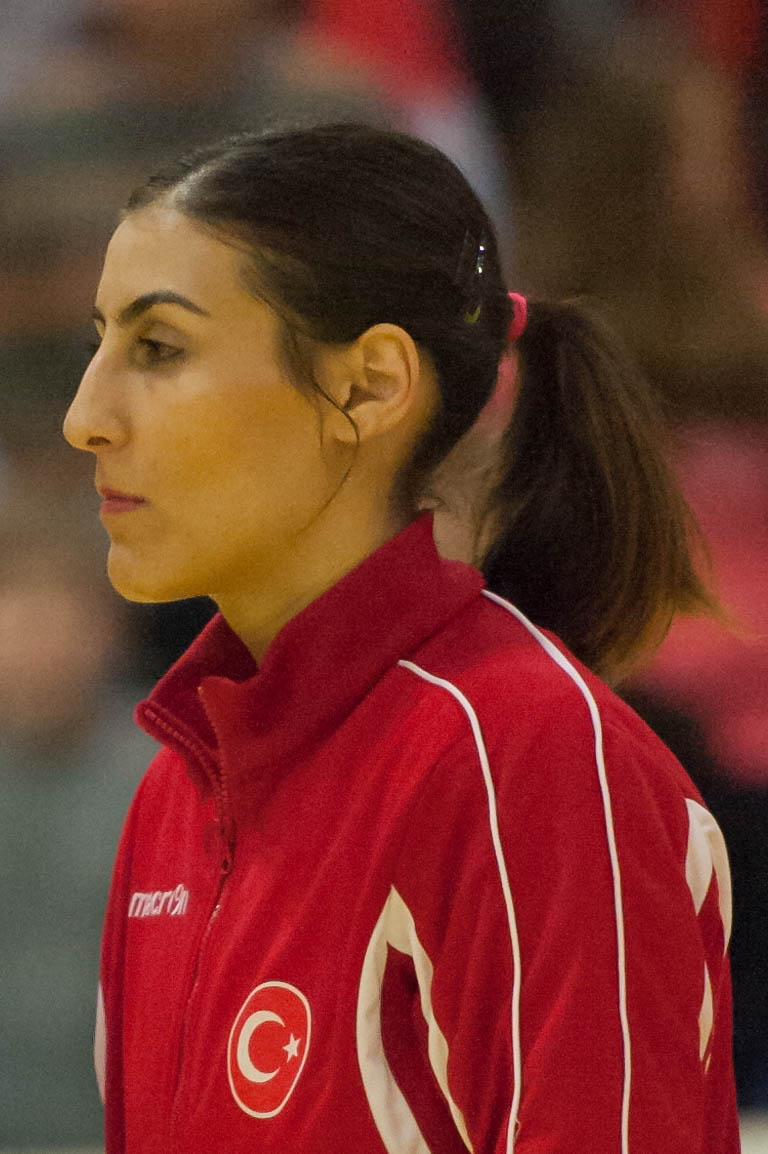
Nurceren Akgün attacking Austria at the 2015 World Women's Handball Championship European qualification match.

Nurceren Akgün Göktepe (née Nurceren Akgün; 20 June 1992), also known as Nurceren Akgün Göktepe, is a Turkish women's handballer, who plays as line player for Yalıkavak in the Turkish Super League9, and the Turkey national team.

== Personal life ==
Nurceren Akgün was born in Antalya, Turkey on 20 June 1992. Following her marriage to the handball goalkeeper Coşkun Göktepe in 2017, she added "Göktepe", the surname of her spouse, to her family name.

== Club career ==
Akgün Göktepe is 1.81 m (5 ft 11 1/2 in) tall at 70 kg (150 lb). In the beginning of her career, she played in the left wing position. With her transfer to Yenimahalle Bld. SK, she started to play as a line player.

=== Muratpaşa Bld. SK ===
Akgün started her handball career at her hometown club Muratpaşa Bld. SK, playing in the 2010–11 season. She experienced her team's third-place finish in the league in the 2010–11 season, champions title in the 2011–12, 2012–13 and 2013–14 seasons as well as the runner-up position in the 2014–15 season.

She took part in the Women's EHF European Cup in 2010–1, and 2011–12, in the Women's EHF Cup Winners' Cup in 2012/13, and 2013/14, in the Women's EHF Champions League qualification tournament in 2012–13, and 2013–14, as well as in the Women's EHF Cup in 2014–15.

=== Yenimahalle Bld. SK ===
In the 2015–16 season, she moved to Ankara to join Yenimahalle Bld. SK. She played ın Yenimahalle Bld. SK including the 2020–21 season. She scored in total 62 goals in 22 matches played in the 2020–21 season.

She participated in the Women's EHF Cup Winners' Cup in 2015/16, in the Women's EHF Champions League qualifying in 2015–16, 2016–17, and 2017–18, the Women's EHF Cup in 2016–17, as well as in the Women's EHF European Cup in 2018–19, and 2019–20.

=== A.B.B. EGO SK ===
In May 2021, she transferred to the newly formed club Ankara Büyükşehir Belediyesi EGO SK. She appeared in only three matches of her new club in September of the 2021–22 Super League season.

=== Kastamonu Bld. GSK ===
In October 2021, Akgün Göktepe moved to Kastamonu Bld. GSK to play in the remaining 2021–22 season. She played two seasons there until the 2022–23 season. Her team was the runner-up in the 2022–23 Women's Handball Turkish Cup ("2022–23 Kadınlar Hentbol Türkiye Kupası").

She took part in the Women's EHF Champions League in 2021–22, and 2022–23. She won the 2022–23 Turkeish Super League with her team.

=== Yenimahalle Bld. SK ===
In April 2023, she signed a deal with her former club Yenimahalle Bld. SK for the 2023–24 Super League season.

=== Yalıkavak SK ===
In the 2024–25 Super League season, she transferred to the Bodrum, Muğla-based club Yalıkavak

== International career ==
Akgün Göktepe is a member of the Turkey national team. She captained the team in 2021. She played in the 2015 World Women's Handball Championship – European qualification. In 2017, she won the silver medal with the national team at the Islamic Solidarity Games in Baku, Azerbaycan. She took part in the Mediterranean Games in 2018 in Tarragona, Spain, and 2022 in Oran, Algeria, in the European Women's Handball Championship qualifying in 2018, 2021, and 2022. She played in the 2023 World Championship – European qualification matches.

== Honours ==
=== Individual ===
In August 2021, she was honored by the Hentbol Haber with the Bests of Handball award for her successful appearance as line player in the 2020–21 Turkish Super League.

=== Club ===
Turkish Women's Handball Super League

Muratpaşa Bld. SK
Champions (3): 2011–12, 2012–13, 2013–14.
Runners-up (1): 2014–15.
Third places (1): 2010–11.

Yenimahalle Bld. SK
Runners-up (2): 2016–17, 2023–24.

Kastamonu Bld. GSK
Champions (1): 2022–23.

Yalıvak SK
Champions (1): 2024–25.

Turkish Women's Handball Super Cup

Yenimahalle Bld. SK
Winners (1): 2015.
Finalists (): 2016, 2017.

Kastamonu Bld. GSK
Winners (2): 2022
Yalıkavak SK
Winners (1): 2024.
Finalists: (1): 2025.

Turkish Women's Handball Cup

Kastamonu Bld. GSK
Winners (1): 2021–22
Finalists (1): 2022–23

=== International ===
Turkey women's national handball team

Islamic Solidarity Games
Silver medal (1): 2017
