= 2012–13 EHF Women's Champions League qualifying =

This article describes the qualifying for the 2012–13 EHF Women's Champions League.

== Qualification tournament ==
A total of 14 teams took part in the qualification tournaments. The clubs were drawn into three groups of four and played a semifinal and the final. The winner of the qualification groups advanced to the group stage, while the eliminated clubs went to the EHF Cup. Matches were played at 8–9 September 2011. The draw took place on 3 July, at 11:00 local time at Vienna, Austria.

=== Seedings ===
The two remaining teams from Pot 1 and 4 played a knock-out match, the winner went into the group stage. The draw was held on 3 July 2012.

Pot 1	Pot 2	Pot 3	Pot 4
(Norway) Byåsen HE (Hungary) FTC-Rail Cargo Hungaria (Romania) U Jolidon Cluj-Napoca (Denmark) Viborg HK	(Spain) Balonmano Bera-Bera (Russia) Rostov-Don (Germany) Buxtehuder SV	(Poland) Vistal Łączpol Gdynia (Netherlands) SERCODAK Dalfsen (Serbia) RK Zaječar	(North Macedonia) ŽRK Metalurg (Turkey) Muraptaşa BSK Antalya (Slovakia) IUVENTA Michalovce (Switzerland) LC Brühl

== Qualification tournament 1 ==
Viborg HK organized the event.

Semi-finals
22 September 2012
(Denmark) Viborg HK	30
(Switzerland) LC Brühl	14
22 September 2012
(Spain) Balonmano Bera-Bera	22
(Poland) Vistal Łączpol Gdynia	31

Final
23 September 2012
(Denmark) Viborg HK	26
(Poland) Vistal Łączpol Gdynia	22
Third place
23 September 2012
(Switzerland) LC Brühl	23
(Spain) Balonmano Bera-Bera	33

=== Semifinals ===
22 September 2012; 13:00	Viborg HK (Denmark)	30–14	(Switzerland) LC Brühl	Viborg Stadionhal, Viborg; Attendance: 985; Referees: Crnojević, Radič (CRO)
22 September 2012; 13:00	Pedersen 5	(15–6)	Bösch 4	Viborg Stadionhal, Viborg; Attendance: 985; Referees: Crnojević, Radič (CRO)
22 September 2012; 13:00	2× (yellow card) 5× (suspension)	Report	3× (yellow card) 2× (suspension)	Viborg Stadionhal, Viborg; Attendance: 985; Referees: Crnojević, Radič (CRO)

22 September 2012; 16:00	Balonmano Bera-Bera (Spain)	22–31	(Poland) Vistal Łączpol Gdynia	Viborg Stadionhal, Viborg; Attendance: 300; Referees: Brkic, Jusufhodzic (AUT)
22 September 2012; 16:00	Rubio Ponce 7	(11–18)	Sulzycka 7	Viborg Stadionhal, Viborg; Attendance: 300; Referees: Brkic, Jusufhodzic (AUT)
22 September 2012; 16:00	3× (yellow card) 3× (suspension)	Report	3× (yellow card) 4× (suspension)	Viborg Stadionhal, Viborg; Attendance: 300; Referees: Brkic, Jusufhodzic (AUT)

=== Third place game ===
23 September 2012; 14:00	LC Brühl (Switzerland)	23–33	(Spain) Balonmano Bera-Bera	Viborg Stadionhal, Viborg; Attendance: 150; Referees: Crnojević, Radič (CRO)
23 September 2012; 14:00	Bösch 9	(11–17)	Elorza 8	Viborg Stadionhal, Viborg; Attendance: 150; Referees: Crnojević, Radič (CRO)
23 September 2012; 14:00	2× (yellow card) 3× (suspension)	Report	3× (yellow card) 2× (suspension)	Viborg Stadionhal, Viborg; Attendance: 150; Referees: Crnojević, Radič (CRO)

=== Final ===
23 September 2012; 16:50	Viborg HK (Denmark)	26–22	(Poland) Vistal Łączpol Gdynia	Viborg Stadionhal, Viborg; Attendance: 1,100; Referees: Brkic, Jusufhodzic (AUT)
23 September 2012; 16:50	Gulldén 6	(12–11)	Zych 6	Viborg Stadionhal, Viborg; Attendance: 1,100; Referees: Brkic, Jusufhodzic (AUT)
23 September 2012; 16:50	3× (yellow card) 1× (suspension)	Report	3× (yellow card) 4× (suspension)	Viborg Stadionhal, Viborg; Attendance: 1,100; Referees: Brkic, Jusufhodzic (AUT)

== Qualification tournament 2 ==
Byåsen HE organized the event.

Semi-finals
22 September 2012
(Norway) Byåsen HE	29
(North Macedonia) ŽRK Metalurg	19
22 September 2012
(Germany) Buxtehuder SV	34
(Netherlands) SERCODAK Dalfsen	31

Final
23 September 2012
(Norway) Byåsen HE	22
(Germany) Buxtehuder SV	26
Third place
23 September 2012
(North Macedonia) ŽRK Metalurg	34
(Netherlands) SERCODAK Dalfsen	26

=== Semifinals ===
22 September 2012; 14:30	Byåsen HE (Norway)	29–19	(North Macedonia) ŽRK Metalurg	Trondheim Spektrum, Trondheim; Attendance: 550; Referees: Santos, Fonseca (POR)
22 September 2012; 14:30	Alstad 12	(16–7)	Pecevska 4	Trondheim Spektrum, Trondheim; Attendance: 550; Referees: Santos, Fonseca (POR)
22 September 2012; 14:30	3× (yellow card) 4× (suspension)	Report	1× (yellow card) 7× (suspension)	Trondheim Spektrum, Trondheim; Attendance: 550; Referees: Santos, Fonseca (POR)

22 September 2012; 17:00	Buxtehuder SV (Germany)	34–31	(Netherlands) SERCODAK Dalfsen	Trondheim Spektrum, Trondheim; Attendance: 60; Referees: Lythje, Christiansen (DEN)
22 September 2012; 17:00	Bülau 6	(18–16)	Logtenberg 13	Trondheim Spektrum, Trondheim; Attendance: 60; Referees: Lythje, Christiansen (DEN)
22 September 2012; 17:00	3× (yellow card) 3× (suspension)	Report	2× (yellow card) 4× (suspension)	Trondheim Spektrum, Trondheim; Attendance: 60; Referees: Lythje, Christiansen (DEN)

=== Third place game ===
23 September 2012; 15:30	ŽRK Metalurg (North Macedonia)	34–26	(Netherlands) SERCODAK Dalfsen	Trondheim Spektrum, Trondheim; Attendance: 50; Referees: Lythje, Christiansen (DEN)
23 September 2012; 15:30	Mladenovska, Pecevska 6	(14–12)	Nijboer 5	Trondheim Spektrum, Trondheim; Attendance: 50; Referees: Lythje, Christiansen (DEN)
23 September 2012; 15:30	3× (yellow card) 6× (suspension)	Report	2× (yellow card) 3× (suspension)	Trondheim Spektrum, Trondheim; Attendance: 50; Referees: Lythje, Christiansen (DEN)

=== Final ===
23 September 2012; 18:00	Byåsen HE (Norway)	22–26	(Germany) Buxtehuder SV	Trondheim Spektrum, Trondheim; Attendance: 637; Referees: Santos, Fonseca (POR)
23 September 2012; 18:00	Alstad 7	(12–14)	Fischer, Lütz 6	Trondheim Spektrum, Trondheim; Attendance: 637; Referees: Santos, Fonseca (POR)
23 September 2012; 18:00	3× (yellow card) 3× (suspension)	Report	3× (yellow card) 5× (suspension)	Trondheim Spektrum, Trondheim; Attendance: 637; Referees: Santos, Fonseca (POR)

== Qualification tournament 3 ==
U Jolidon Cluj-Napoca organized the event.

Semi-finals
22 September 2012
(Romania) Cluj-Napoca	34
(Turkey) BSK Antalya	26
22 September 2012
(Russia) Rostov-Don	29
(Serbia) RK Zaječar	28

Final
23 September 2012
(Romania) Cluj-Napoca	23
(Russia) Rostov-Don	22
Third place
23 September 2012
(Turkey) BSK Antalya	27
(Serbia) RK Zaječar	35

=== Semifinals ===
22 September 2012; 17:20	U Jolidon Cluj-Napoca (Romania)	34–26	(Turkey) Muraptaşa BSK Antalya	Horia Demian Sports Hall, Cluj-Napoca; Attendance: 2,000; Referees: Brehmer, Skowronek (POL)
22 September 2012; 17:20	Paraschiv, Tivadar 8	(16–18)	İskenderoğlu 6	Horia Demian Sports Hall, Cluj-Napoca; Attendance: 2,000; Referees: Brehmer, Skowronek (POL)
22 September 2012; 17:20	3× (yellow card) 5× (suspension)	Report	3× (yellow card) 5× (suspension)	Horia Demian Sports Hall, Cluj-Napoca; Attendance: 2,000; Referees: Brehmer, Skowronek (POL)

22 September 2012; 19:30	Rostov-Don (Russia)	29–28	(Serbia) RK Zaječar	Horia Demian Sports Hall, Cluj-Napoca; Attendance: 1,000; Referees: Stolarovs, Licis (LAT)
22 September 2012; 19:30	Shymkute 9	(12–9)	Peraica, Vučković 7	Horia Demian Sports Hall, Cluj-Napoca; Attendance: 1,000; Referees: Stolarovs, Licis (LAT)
22 September 2012; 19:30	3× (yellow card) 7× (suspension)	Report	3× (yellow card) 2× (suspension)	Horia Demian Sports Hall, Cluj-Napoca; Attendance: 1,000; Referees: Stolarovs, Licis (LAT)

=== Third place game ===
23 September 2012; 19:30	Muraptaşa BSK Antalya (Turkey)	27–35	(Serbia) RK Zaječar	Horia Demian Sports Hall, Cluj-Napoca; Attendance: 500; Referees: Brehmer, Skowronek (POL)
23 September 2012; 19:30	Khouildi 6	(13–8)	Zebić 10	Horia Demian Sports Hall, Cluj-Napoca; Attendance: 500; Referees: Brehmer, Skowronek (POL)
23 September 2012; 19:30	2× (yellow card) 2× (suspension)	Report	2× (yellow card) 8× (suspension)	Horia Demian Sports Hall, Cluj-Napoca; Attendance: 500; Referees: Brehmer, Skowronek (POL)

=== Final ===
23 September 2012; 17:00	U Jolidon Cluj-Napoca (Romania)	23–22	(Russia) Rostov-Don	Horia Demian Sports Hall, Cluj-Napoca; Attendance: 2,500; Referees: Stolarovs, Licis (LAT)
23 September 2012; 17:00	Cartaș 9	(13–11)	Yartseva 7	Horia Demian Sports Hall, Cluj-Napoca; Attendance: 2,500; Referees: Stolarovs, Licis (LAT)
23 September 2012; 17:00	3× (yellow card) 2× (suspension)	Report	3× (yellow card) 6× (suspension)	Horia Demian Sports Hall, Cluj-Napoca; Attendance: 2,500; Referees: Stolarovs, Licis (LAT)

== Play-off ==
IUVENTA Michalovce and FTC-Rail Cargo Hungaria played a playoff series to determine a participant for the group stage.

19 September 2012; 18:00	IUVENTA Michalovce (Slovakia)	26–40	(Hungary) FTC-Rail Cargo Hungaria	Chemkostav Arena, Chemkostav Arena; Attendance: 1,800; Referees: Marić, Mašić (SRB)
19 September 2012; 18:00	Tobiášová 6	(10–15)	Pena, Tomori 6	Chemkostav Arena, Chemkostav Arena; Attendance: 1,800; Referees: Marić, Mašić (SRB)
19 September 2012; 18:00	2× (yellow card) 4× (suspension)	Report	3× (yellow card) 1× (suspension)	Chemkostav Arena, Chemkostav Arena; Attendance: 1,800; Referees: Marić, Mašić (SRB)

22 September 2012; 18:00	FTC-Rail Cargo Hungaria (Hungary)	31–22	(Slovakia) IUVENTA Michalovce	Elek Gyula Aréna, Budapest; Attendance: 1,000; Referees: Delle, Engberg (SWE)
22 September 2012; 18:00	Pena 6	(16–8)	Wollingerová 5	Elek Gyula Aréna, Budapest; Attendance: 1,000; Referees: Delle, Engberg (SWE)
22 September 2012; 18:00	3× (yellow card) 3× (suspension)	Report	3× (yellow card) 1× (suspension)	Elek Gyula Aréna, Budapest; Attendance: 1,000; Referees: Delle, Engberg (SWE)

FTC-Rail Cargo Hungaria wins 71–48 on aggregate.

== Wild card tournament ==
Issy-Paris Hand organized the event.

Team	Pld	W	D	L	GF	GA	GD	Pts
(Russia) Zvezda Zvenigorod	2	2	0	0	52	41	+11	4
(Germany) HC Leipzig	2	1	0	1	42	42	0	2
(France) Issy-Paris Hand	2	0	0	2	36	47	−11	0

21 September 2012; 19:00	HC Leipzig (Germany)	21–16	(France) Issy-Paris Hand	Palais Omnisports de Paris-Bercy, Paris; Referees: Brunovský, Čanda (SVK)
21 September 2012; 19:00	Kudłacz 6	(14–10)	Signaté 9	Palais Omnisports de Paris-Bercy, Paris; Referees: Brunovský, Čanda (SVK)
21 September 2012; 19:00	3× (yellow card) 3× (suspension)	Report	3× (yellow card) 3× (suspension)	Palais Omnisports de Paris-Bercy, Paris; Referees: Brunovský, Čanda (SVK)

22 September 2012; 16:00	Zvezda Zvenigorod (Russia)	26–21	(Germany) HC Leipzig	Palais Omnisports de Paris-Bercy, Paris; Referees: Brunovský, Čanda (SVK)
22 September 2012; 16:00	three players 5	(12–12)	Visser 6	Palais Omnisports de Paris-Bercy, Paris; Referees: Brunovský, Čanda (SVK)
22 September 2012; 16:00	3× (yellow card) 2× (suspension)	Report	3× (yellow card) 3× (suspension)	Palais Omnisports de Paris-Bercy, Paris; Referees: Brunovský, Čanda (SVK)

23 September 2012; 12:00	Issy-Paris Hand (France)	20–26	(Russia) Zvezda Zvenigorod	Palais Omnisports de Paris-Bercy, Paris; Attendance: 720; Referees: Brunovský, Čanda (SVK)
23 September 2012; 12:00	Signaté 6	(7–11)	Lobach 5	Palais Omnisports de Paris-Bercy, Paris; Attendance: 720; Referees: Brunovský, Čanda (SVK)
23 September 2012; 12:00	3× (yellow card) 1× (suspension)	Report	3× (yellow card) 4× (suspension)	Palais Omnisports de Paris-Bercy, Paris; Attendance: 720; Referees: Brunovský, Čanda (SVK)
