= Yenimahalle Bld. SK (women's handball) =

Turkish handball club

- Full name: Yenimahalle Belediyesi Spor Kulübü
- President: Mesut Bolatcan
- Head coach: Serdar Eler
- League: Turkish Super League
- 2020–21: 3rd
- Club colours

Yenimahalle Belediyesi SK (Turkish: Yenimahalle Belediyesi Spor Kulübü) is the women's handball team of the same named club sponsored by the Municipality of Yenimahalle in Ankara, Turkey. The team play in the Turkish Super League. Their colors are blue and white. Club chairman is Mesut Bolatcan. The team is managed by Serdar Eler.

== Competitions ==
=== Domestic ===
The club transferred seven notable players, including Turkey women's national team's captain Yeliz Özel and two foreigners, for the 2013–14 season. The team finished the season as runner-up losing to Muratpaşa Bld. SK in play-off finals. The following season they became champions.

=== International ===
Yenimahalle Bld. Sk played in the 2015–16 Women's EHF Champions League qualifying, lost in the semifinals to the Danish Team Esbjerg 28–32, ranked fourth after being defeated by the Belarusian BNTU Minsk 27–31 in the third place match. They failed to advance to the quarterfinals at the 2015–16 Women's EHF Cup Winners' Cup after losing 58–59 in two games to the Russian Zvezda Zvenigorod.

== European record ==
Season	Competition	Round	Club	1st leg	2nd leg	Aggregate
2016–17	EHF Champions League	Q1	(Norway) Glassverket IF	23–34		3rd place
2016–17	EHF Champions League	Q1	(Netherlands) SERCODAK Dalfsen	31–22		3rd place
2016–17	EHF Cup	R3	(Germany) TuS Metzingen	33–27	23–36	56–63

== Current squad ==
=== Players ===
Team members at the 2025–26 Turkish Women's Handball Super League:

- 2 (Turkey) Hatice Karataş (LB)
- 5 (Turkey) Şükran Eylül Bilgiç (LP)
- 8 (Turkey) Gizem Nur Oğuz
- 10 (Turkey) Ayşıl Asan
- 11 (Turkey) Gazel Yılmaz (LB)
- 13 (Turkey) Lena Mot (RW)
- 15 (Turkey) Meryem Nehir Uzun (CB)
- 16 (Turkey) Seda İrem Güleç (GK)
- 17 (Turkey) Tuğçe Songür (RB)
- 18 (Turkey) Tuğba Özben
- 20 (Romania) Zsófia Csavar (RB)
- 23 (Turkey) Zeynep Özgan
- 24 (Turkey) Funda Okur (LW)
- 71 (Turkey) Hande Muhcu (LB)
- 77 (Turkey) Ceyda Doğan (LP)
- 84 (Turkey) Açelya Kaya (CB)

== Former notable players ==
Azerbaijan

- Marina Tankaskaya (born 1983)

Croatia

- Anita Gaće (born 1983)
- Dina Havić (born 1987)

North Macedonia

- Andrea Beleska (born 1994)
- Lenche Ilkova (born 1987)

Poland

- Anna Wysokińska (born 1987)

Romania

- Anca Mihaela Rombescu (born 1985)

Serbia

- Marina Dmitrović (born 1985)
- Dijana Radojević (born 1990)

Turkey

- Selen Akalın (born 1998)
- Nurceren Akgün (born 1992)
- Elif Sıla Aydın (born 1996)
- Edanur Burhan (born 1999)
- Esra Gündar (born 1980)
- Beyza Karaçam (born 2000)
- Yeliz Özel (born 1980)
- Bilgenur Öztürk (born 1999)
- Gülcan Tügel (born 2000)
- Beyza İrem Türkoğlu (born 1997)

Ukraine

- Kateryna Chumak (born 1988)
- Olga Laiuk (born 1984)
- Valeriia Zoria (born 1987)

== Honours ==
Turkish Handball Super League

- Winners (2): 2014–15, 2015–16.
- Runners-up (1): 2013–14.
- Third place (1): 2020–21.

Women's EHF Champions League

- Fourth place (1): 2015–16
