= 2016–17 Women's EHF Champions League qualifying =

This article describes the qualifying of the 2016–17 Women's EHF Champions League.

== Draw ==
The draw was held on 29 June 2016 at 13:00 in Vienna, Austria. The twelve teams were split in three groups and play a semifinal and final to determine the last participants. Matches will be played on 10 and 11 September 2016.

=== Seedings ===
The seedings were announced on 27 June 2016.

Pot 1	Pot 2	Pot 3	Pot 4
(Norway) Glassverket IF (Germany) HC Leipzig (Slovenia) Krim	(Austria) Hypo Niederösterreich (Croatia) Podravka Koprivnica (Poland) MKS Selgros Lublin	(Italy) Indeco Conversano (Spain) BM Bera Bera (Netherlands) SERCODAK Dalfsen	(Belarus) HC Gomel (Turkey) Yenimahalle Bld. SK (Slovakia) IUVENTA Michalovce

== Qualification tournament 1 ==
Glassverket IF organized the tournament.

=== Bracket ===
Semifinals
10 September
(Norway) Glassverket IF	34
(Turkey) Yenimahalle Bld. SK	23
10 September
(Croatia) Podravka Koprivnica	30
(Netherlands) SERCODAK Dalfsen	17

Final
11 September
(Norway) Glassverket IF	28
(Croatia) Podravka Koprivnica	19
Third place
11 September
(Turkey) Yenimahalle Bld. SK	31
(Netherlands) SERCODAK Dalfsen	22

=== Semifinals ===
10 September 2016; 16:30	Glassverket IF (Norway)	34–23	(Turkey) Yenimahalle Bld. SK	Drammenshallen, Drammen; Attendance: 450; Referees: Vujačić, Kažanegra (MNE)
10 September 2016; 16:30	Wolff 6	(15–9)	three players 4	Drammenshallen, Drammen; Attendance: 450; Referees: Vujačić, Kažanegra (MNE)
10 September 2016; 16:30	3× (yellow card) 3× (suspension)	Report	2× (yellow card) 4× (suspension)	Drammenshallen, Drammen; Attendance: 450; Referees: Vujačić, Kažanegra (MNE)

10 September 2016; 19:00	Podravka Koprivnica (Croatia)	30–17	(Netherlands) SERCODAK Dalfsen	Drammenshallen, Drammen; Attendance: 105; Referees: Năstase, Stancu (ROU)
10 September 2016; 19:00	Vidak 9	(13–7)	Noordink, Nüsser 4	Drammenshallen, Drammen; Attendance: 105; Referees: Năstase, Stancu (ROU)
10 September 2016; 19:00	3× (yellow card) 8× (suspension) 2× (red card)	Report	2× (yellow card) 3× (suspension)	Drammenshallen, Drammen; Attendance: 105; Referees: Năstase, Stancu (ROU)

=== Third place game ===
11 September 2016; 15:30	Yenimahalle Bld. SK (Turkey)	31–22	(Netherlands) SERCODAK Dalfsen	Drammenshallen, Drammen; Attendance: 125; Referees: Vujačić, Kažanegra (MNE)
11 September 2016; 15:30	Laiuk 9	(17–12)	Pavković 5	Drammenshallen, Drammen; Attendance: 125; Referees: Vujačić, Kažanegra (MNE)
11 September 2016; 15:30	3× (yellow card) 4× (suspension)	Report	3× (yellow card) 3× (suspension) 1× (red card)	Drammenshallen, Drammen; Attendance: 125; Referees: Vujačić, Kažanegra (MNE)

=== Final ===
11 September 2016; 18:00	Glassverket IF (Norway)	28–19	(Croatia) Podravka Koprivnica	Drammenshallen, Drammen; Attendance: 510; Referees: Năstase, Stancu (ROU)
11 September 2016; 18:00	Christensen 10	(12–12)	three players 4	Drammenshallen, Drammen; Attendance: 510; Referees: Năstase, Stancu (ROU)
11 September 2016; 18:00	3× (yellow card) 3× (suspension)	Report	3× (yellow card) 4× (suspension)	Drammenshallen, Drammen; Attendance: 510; Referees: Năstase, Stancu (ROU)

== Qualification tournament 2 ==
BM Bera Bera organized the tournament.

=== Bracket ===
Semifinals
9 September
(Germany) HC Leipzig	29
(Belarus) HC Gomel	18
9 September
(Austria) Hypo Niederösterreich	25
(Spain) BM Bera Bera	21

Final
10 September
(Germany) HC Leipzig	32
(Austria) Hypo Niederösterreich	30
Third place
10 September
(Belarus) HC Gomel	20
(Spain) BM Bera Bera	28

=== Semifinals ===
9 September 2016; 16:00	HC Leipzig (Germany)	29–18	(Belarus) HC Gomel	Polideportivo Bidebieta, San Sebastián; Attendance: 1,000; Referees: Tzaferopoulos, Bethmann (GRE)
9 September 2016; 16:00	Kudłacz-Gloc 7	(13–6)	Akhramenka, Dronova 4	Polideportivo Bidebieta, San Sebastián; Attendance: 1,000; Referees: Tzaferopoulos, Bethmann (GRE)
9 September 2016; 16:00	3× (yellow card) 3× (suspension)	Report	3× (yellow card) 1× (suspension)	Polideportivo Bidebieta, San Sebastián; Attendance: 1,000; Referees: Tzaferopoulos, Bethmann (GRE)

9 September 2016; 18:30	Hypo Niederösterreich (Austria)	25–21	(Spain) BM Bera Bera	Polideportivo Bidebieta, San Sebastián; Attendance: 2,000; Referees: Opava, Válek (CZE)
9 September 2016; 18:30	Aćimović 8	(14–12)	Fernández 4	Polideportivo Bidebieta, San Sebastián; Attendance: 2,000; Referees: Opava, Válek (CZE)
9 September 2016; 18:30	3× (yellow card) 3× (suspension)	Report	2× (yellow card) 2× (suspension)	Polideportivo Bidebieta, San Sebastián; Attendance: 2,000; Referees: Opava, Válek (CZE)

=== Third place game ===
10 September 2016; 16:00	HC Gomel (Belarus)	20–28	(Spain) BM Bera Bera	Polideportivo Bidebieta, San Sebastián; Attendance: 1,500; Referees: Tzaferopoulos, Bethmann (GRE)
10 September 2016; 16:00	Dronova 5	(12–14)	López 8	Polideportivo Bidebieta, San Sebastián; Attendance: 1,500; Referees: Tzaferopoulos, Bethmann (GRE)
10 September 2016; 16:00	3× (yellow card) 2× (suspension)	Report	3× (yellow card) 4× (suspension)	Polideportivo Bidebieta, San Sebastián; Attendance: 1,500; Referees: Tzaferopoulos, Bethmann (GRE)

=== Final ===
10 September 2016; 18:30	HC Leipzig (Germany)	32–30	(Austria) Hypo Niederösterreich	Polideportivo Bidebieta, San Sebastián; Attendance: 1,250; Referees: Opava, Válek (CZE)
10 September 2016; 18:30	Kudłacz-Gloc 9	(15–16)	Aćimović 14	Polideportivo Bidebieta, San Sebastián; Attendance: 1,250; Referees: Opava, Válek (CZE)
10 September 2016; 18:30	3× (yellow card) 3× (suspension)	Report	2× (yellow card) 3× (suspension)	Polideportivo Bidebieta, San Sebastián; Attendance: 1,250; Referees: Opava, Válek (CZE)

== Qualification tournament 3 ==
Krim organized the tournament.

=== Bracket ===
Semifinals
10 September
(Slovenia) Krim	28
(Slovakia) IUVENTA Michalovce	22
10 September
(Poland) MKS Selgros Lublin	27
(Italy) Indeco Conversano	28

Final
11 September
(Slovenia) Krim	37
(Italy) Indeco Conversano	16
Third place
11 September
(Slovakia) IUVENTA Michalovce	21
(Poland) MKS Selgros Lublin	33

=== Semifinals ===
10 September 2016; 16:00	Krim (Slovenia)	28–22	(Slovakia) IUVENTA Michalovce	Kodeljevo Hall, Ljubljana; Attendance: 1,000; Referees: Brkic, Jusufhodzic (AUT)
10 September 2016; 16:00	Bajramoska, Barič 6	(14–10)	Levchenko 5	Kodeljevo Hall, Ljubljana; Attendance: 1,000; Referees: Brkic, Jusufhodzic (AUT)
10 September 2016; 16:00	3× (yellow card) 5× (suspension)	Report	3× (yellow card) 3× (suspension)	Kodeljevo Hall, Ljubljana; Attendance: 1,000; Referees: Brkic, Jusufhodzic (AUT)

10 September 2016; 18:30	MKS Selgros Lublin (Poland)	27–28	(Italy) Indeco Conversano	Kodeljevo Hall, Ljubljana; Attendance: 150; Referees: Brunner, Salah (SUI)
10 September 2016; 18:30	Repelewska 5	(12–14)	Rotondo 9	Kodeljevo Hall, Ljubljana; Attendance: 150; Referees: Brunner, Salah (SUI)
10 September 2016; 18:30	2× (yellow card) 3× (suspension)	Report	2× (yellow card) 5× (suspension)	Kodeljevo Hall, Ljubljana; Attendance: 150; Referees: Brunner, Salah (SUI)

=== Third place game ===
11 September 2016; 14:00	IUVENTA Michalovce (Slovakia)	21–33	(Poland) MKS Selgros Lublin	Kodeljevo Hall, Ljubljana; Attendance: 70; Referees: Brunner, Salah (SUI)
11 September 2016; 14:00	Levchenko 4	(12–16)	Kozimur 7	Kodeljevo Hall, Ljubljana; Attendance: 70; Referees: Brunner, Salah (SUI)
11 September 2016; 14:00	2× (yellow card) 2× (suspension)	Report	2× (yellow card) 5× (suspension)	Kodeljevo Hall, Ljubljana; Attendance: 70; Referees: Brunner, Salah (SUI)

=== Final ===
11 September 2016; 17:00	Krim (Slovenia)	37–16	(Italy) Indeco Conversano	Kodeljevo Hall, Ljubljana; Attendance: 1,200; Referees: Brkic, Jusufhodzic (AUT)
11 September 2016; 17:00	Kamdop 7	(20–7)	Duran 7	Kodeljevo Hall, Ljubljana; Attendance: 1,200; Referees: Brkic, Jusufhodzic (AUT)
11 September 2016; 17:00	3× (yellow card) 3× (suspension)	Report	2× (yellow card) 1× (suspension)	Kodeljevo Hall, Ljubljana; Attendance: 1,200; Referees: Brkic, Jusufhodzic (AUT)
