= Akalın =

Akalın is a Turkish name and may refer to:

== Surname ==
- Berk Akalın (born 1995), Turkish ice dancer
- Besim Ömer Akalın (1862–1940), Turkish physician
- Cansu Akalın (born 1998), Turkish female handball player
- Demet Akalın (born 1972), Turkish pop singer
- Kaan Akalın (born 1997), Turkish musician
- Selen Akalın (born 1998), Turkish female handball player
- Şükrü Halûk Akalın (born 1956), Turkish academic and civil servant
- Turan Akalın (born 1984), Turkish wheelchair tennis player and wheelchaircurler

== Place name ==
- Akalın, Hasankeyf, a village in Hasankeyf district of Batman Province, Turkey
- Akalın, Kahta, a village in Kahta district of Adıyaman Province, Turkey
