= Kastamonu Bld. GSK (women's handball) =

Turkish women's handball team

- Full name: Kastamonu Belediyesi Gençlik Spor Kulübü
- Short name: Kastamonu Belediyespor
- Arena: Kastamonu Merkez Sport Hall
- Capacity: 4000
- President: Mustafa Köklü
- League: Turkish Super League
- 2022–23: 1st
- Club colours
Home	Away

Location of Kastamonu

Kastamonu Bld. GSK (Turkish: Kastamonu Belediyesi Gençlik Spor Kulübü) is the women's handball team of the similarly named club sponsored by the Municipality of Kastamonu, Turkey. The team competes in the Turkish Super League and the 2022–23 Women's EHF Champions League.

== Colors ==
The club colors are white, red and black.

== Competitions ==
=== Domestic ===
Kastamonu Bld. GSK competes in the Turkish Super League.

In July 2015, six notable players, including two Turkish Yeliz Yılmaz and Serpil İskenderoğlu as well as four foreigners Maja Kožnjak, Martin Pavic, Ivana Zafirova and Dorina Emilia Carbune, were transferred for the 2015–16 season.

In summer 2020, it was announced that the Danish handball coach Helle Thomsen was joining the club as new head coach. Swedish handballer Julia Eriksson also joined the club in December 2020, transferred from Lugi HF. In January 2021, the club bought the Norwegian handball star Amanda Kurtović, on loan from Győri Audi ETO KC.

=== International ===
The team played in the final of 2016 EHF Challenge Cup, where they lost to Gran Canaria 25–29 and 29–33. In the 2017–18 season, the team was in EHF Cup semi-final, where they lost to the season's eventual champions SCM Craiova.

After the winner in Turkey league in the 2018–19 season the team got a chance in Qualification tournament in 2019–20 Women's EHF Champions League. In semifinal was win with ŽORK Jagodina 31–15. In the final the next day, they lost 33–35 to the host team from DHK Baník Most and dropped out of the Women's EHF Champions League. Due to qualification for the 2021–22 Women's EHF Champions League, four Montenegrins internationals Marina Rajčić, Jovanka Radičević, Milena Raičević and Majda Mehmedović, joined the club in the summer of 2021.

== Kits ==
HOME
2020–21	2022–23

AWAY
2020–21	2021-22

== Honours ==
- Turkish Handball Super League:
  - Winner(5): 2016–17, 2018–19, 2020–21, 2021–22, 2022–23
  - Silver: 2017–18
  - Bronze: 2014–15.

Turkish Cup (2) : 2020–21, 2021–22 Turkish Super Cup (4) : 2017, 2019, 2021, 2022

- Women's EHF Cup:
  - Semi-finals: 2018
- Women's EHF Challenge Cup:
  - Runners-up: 2016

== Arena ==
- Arena: Kastamonu Merkez Sport Hall
- Location: Kastamonu, Turkey
- Capacity: 4000
- Address: Saraçlar, Stadyum Cd., 37100 Kastamonu Merkez/Kastamonu

== Team ==
=== Current squad ===
Squad for the 2023–24 season

Goalkeepers

- 22 (Turkey) Yaren Berfe Göker
- 26 (Turkey) Kevser Bektas
- 58 (Turkey) Merve Durdu

Wingers
LW

- 05 (Turkey) Beyzanur Türkyılmaz
- 47 (Turkey) Büsra Isikhan

RW

- 03 (Turkey) Nurşah Sancak
- 87 (Turkey) Emine Gökdemir

Line players

- 08 (Turkey) Cansu Akalın
- 14 (Turkey) Nurceren Akgün
- 37 (Turkey) Ceren Coşkun

Back players

- 09 (Turkey) Sinem Vatan
- 10 (Turkey) Burcu Dindar
- 13 (Turkey) Serpil İskenderoğlu
- 21 (Turkey) Betül Yılmaz
- 23 (Turkey) Yasemin Şahin

=== Transfers ===
Transfers for the 2023–24 season

Joining

- (Turkey) Yasemin Şahin
- (Turkey) Cansu Akalın
- (Turkey) Beyzanur Türkyılmaz
- (Turkey) Sinem Vatan
- (Turkey) Burcu Dindar
- (Turkey) Büsra Isikhan

Leaving

- (Montenegro) Majda Mehmedović (LW) (retires)
- (Tunisia) Mouna Chebbah (CB) (to (Turkey) Yalıkavak SK)
- (Turkey) Kübra Sarikaya (LW) (to (Turkey) Yalıkavak SKK)
- (Turkey) Neslihan Çalışkan (LB) (to (Montenegro) ŽRK Budućnost Podgorica)
- (Brazil) Samara Vieira (LB) (to (Turkey) Konyaaltı Bld. SK)
- (Croatia) Katarina Ježić (LP) (to (Romania) HC Dunărea Brăila)
- (Denmark) Simone Bohme (RW) (to (Romania) CSM Târgu-Jiu)

=== Technical staff ===
Technical staff for the 2023–24 season

- (Denmark) Head Coach:
- (Turkey) Assistant coach: Serkan Mehmet Inci
- (Turkey) Goalkeeping coach: Erdal Kaynak
- (Turkey) Physiotherapist: Nurşen İNCE

=== Former notable players ===
- Belarus
  - Nataliya Kotsina
- Brazil
  - Patricia Batista da Silva
  - Jaqueline Anastácio
  - Elaine Gomes
- Croatia
  - Kristina Elez
  - Žana Čović
  - Andrea Šerić
  - Maja Kožnjak
- Czech Republic
  - Sára Kovářová
- North Macedonia
  - Lenche Ilkova
- Montenegro
  - Jovanka Radičević
  - Marina Rajčić
  - Milena Raičević
  - Vanesa Agović
  - Sonja Barjaktarović
  - Ljubica Nenezić
  - Nina Bulatović
- Norway
  - Amanda Kurtović
- Poland
  - Katarzyna Kołodziejska
  - Joanna Wołoszyk
- Romania
  - Dorina Emilia Carbune
  - Anca Mihaela Rombescu
- Russia
  - Yana Uskova
  - Anastasia Sinitsyna
- Tunisia
  - Sondes Hachana
- Turkey
  - Ceyhan Coşkunsu
  - Derya Tınkaoğlu
  - Yasemin Güler
  - Aslı İskit
  - Gonca Nahcıvanlı
  - Olha Vashchuk
  - Sevilay İmamoğlu Öcal
  - Yeliz Yılmaz
  - Neslihan Yakupoğlu
  - Yeliz Yılmaz
  - Yeliz Özel
  - Seda Yörükler
  - Perihan Topaloğlu
- Ukraine
  - Olga Laiuk
  - Yuliya Snopova
