= Sevda Altunoluk =

Turkish Paralympic goalball player

Personal information
- Born: 1 April 1994 (age 32) Tokat, Turkey
- Years active: 2001–

Sport
- Sport: Goalball
- Club: Yenimahalle Belediyesi SK
- Coached by: Osman Karali
Medal record
Women's goalball
Representing Turkey
Paralympic Games
Gold medal – first place	2016 Rio de Janeiro	Team
Gold medal – first place	2020 Tokyo	Team
Gold medal – first place	2024 Paris	Team
IBSA World Championships
Silver medal – second place	2018 Malmo	Team
Bronze medal – third place	2014 Espoo	Team
IBSA European Championships
Gold medal – first place	2012 Ascoli Piceno	Team Div. B
Gold medal – first place	2015 Kaunas	Team
Gold medal – first place	2019 Rostock	Team
Silver medal – second place	2010 Eskişehir	Tram Div. B
Silver medal – second place	2013 Konya	Team
Silver medal – second place	2017 Lahti	Team
Silver medal – second place	2021 Samsun	Team

Sevda Altunoluk (born 1 April 1994) is a Turkish Paralympian goalball player competing for Yenimahalle Belediyespor in Ankara. She is a member of the national team, and was named several times as Top goalscorer. In 2021, she was named as one of the BBC's 100 Women.

== Private life ==
Sevda Altunoluk was born on 1 April 1994). She is a native of Tokat in Turkey. Her sister Sevtap Altunoluk is also a national goalball player.

== Sporting career ==
=== Club ===
Altunoluk began playing goalball at 12 years of age.

She played for the visually impaired sports club Mithat Enç Gören Kalpler SK in Ankara before she transferred to Yenimahalle Belediyesi SK in the same city. Her current team is coached by Ekrem Gündoğdu, a member of the men's goalball team at the same club. Several times, she was recognized as top scorer at the national level.

=== International ===
Altunoluk competes internationally on the Turkey women's national goalball team. She has taken part in various competitions. In 2010, she won the silver medal at the IBSA Goalball European Women's Group B Championship held in Eskişehir, Turkey. At the 2012 IBSA European Goalball Championships Div. B in Ascoli Piceno, Italy, she captured the gold medal and topped the scorer list with 27 goals, followed by Swetlana Otto from Germany with 21. She won the gold medal at the 2013 Pajulahti Games in Nastola, Finland, where she was the top scorer. Altınoluk was also the top scorer of the 2013 Malmö Lady Inter Cup in Malmö with 18 goals, even though her team placed fourth. At the same tournament next year, the team took bronze and she placed second on the top scorer list with 17 goals, behind Laura Belle of Spain. In 2015, she took the gold medal at the 2015 IBSA European Goalball Championships Div. A, in Kaunas, Lithuania. There, she was the top scorer, followed by her teammate Sümeyye Özcan.

Altunoluk was a member of the national team that won the gold medal at the 2016 Summer Paralympics in Rio de Janeiro, Brazil.

== Honours ==
=== Individual ===
- Top scorer – 2012 IBSA Goalball European Championships Div. B in Ascoli Piceno, Italy (27 goals).
- Top scorer – 2013 Malmö Lady Inter Cup in Malmö, Sweden.
- Top scorer – 2013 Pajulahti Games in Nastola, Finland.
- Top scorer - 2014 Goalball World Championship in Espoo, Finland (31 goals)
- Top scorer – 2015 IBSA Goalball European Championships Div. A in Kaunas, Lithuania.
- Top scorer – 2016 Summer Paralympics, Rio de Janeiro, Brazil (36 goals)
- Top scorer – 2017 IBSA Goalball European Championships in Lahti, Finland (37 goals)
- Top scorer – 2018 IBSA Goalball World Championships in Malmö, Sweden (46 goals)
- IPC Allianz Athlete of the Month - 2018 June,
- Best scorer - 2018-19 Super European Women's Goalball League (25 goals)
- Top scorer – 2019 IBSA Goalball Wotld Championships in Rostock, Germany (39 goals)
- Top scorer – 2020 Summer Paralympics, Tokyo, Japan (46 goals)
- In 2021 she was named as one of the BBC's 100 Women

=== Club ===
Turkish Women's First Goalball League
Yenimahalle Belediyesi SK

- Champions (1): 2013–14.

Turkish Women's Goalball Championships
Yenimahalle Belediyesi SK

- Champions (1): 2014.

=== International ===
- (silver) 2010 IBSA Goalball European Women's Group B Championship in Eskişehir, Turkey.
- (gold) 2012 IBSA Goalball European Championships Div. B in Ascoli Piceno, Italy.
- (gold) 2013 Pajulahti Games in Nastola, Finland.
- (silver) 2013 IBSA Goalball European Championship in Konya, Turkey.
- (bronze) 2014 Malmö Ladies and Men's InterCup in Malmö, Sweden.
- (bronze) 2014 IBSA World Goalball Championship in Espoo, Finland.
- (gold) 2015 IBSA Goalball European Championships Div. A in Kaunas, Lithuania.
- (gold) 2016 Summer Paralympics in Rio de Janeiro, Brazil.
- (gold) 2018 Malmö Lady- and Men InterCup in Malmö, Sweden.
- (silver) 2018 Goalball World Championships in Malmö, Sweden.
- (gold) 2019 IBSA Goalball European Championship in Rostock, Germany.
- (gold) 2020 Summer Paralympics in Tokyo, Japan
- (silver) 2021 IBSA Goalball European Championship in Samsun, Turkey.
