= Anna Wysokińska =

Polish handball player (born 1987)

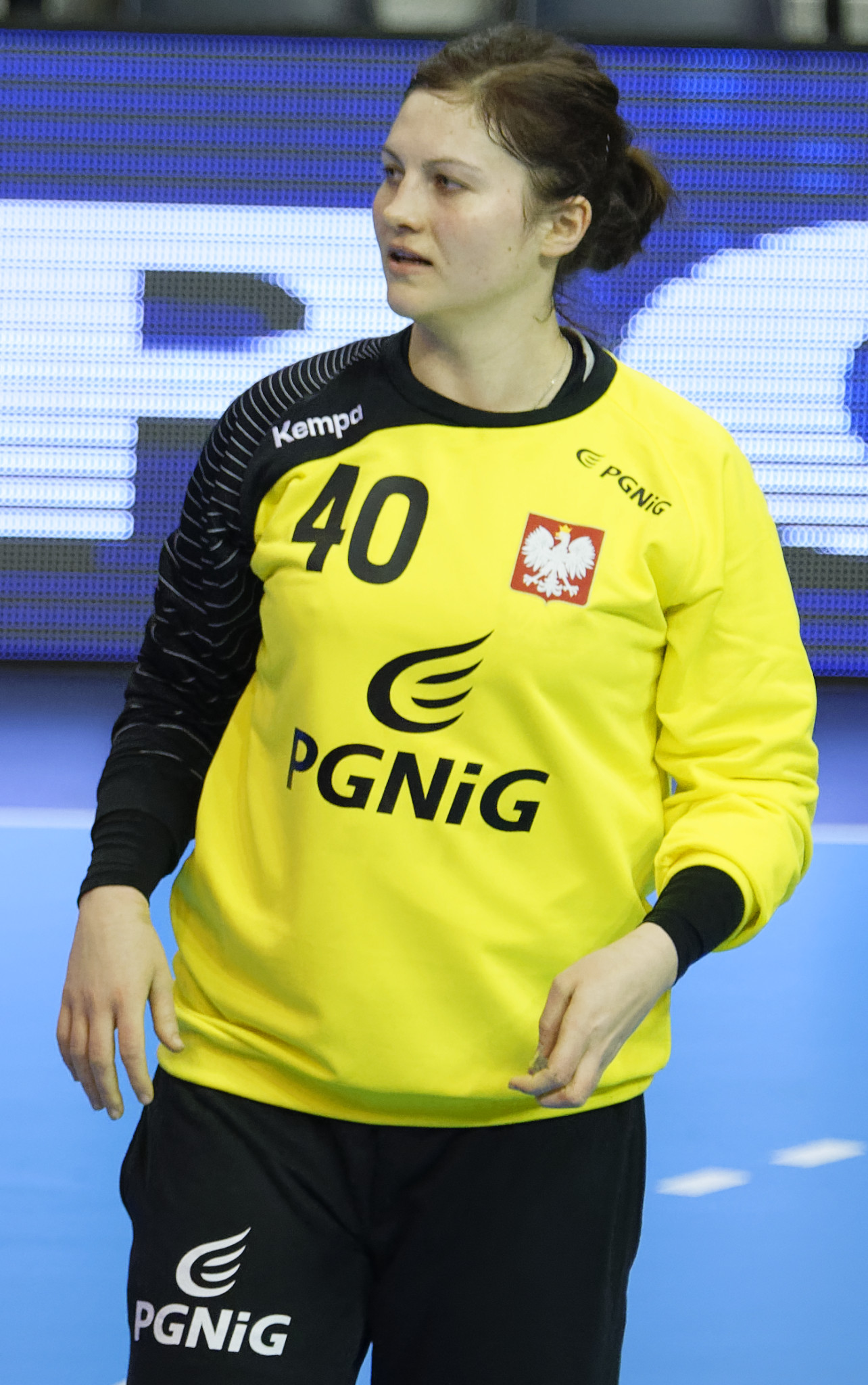

Personal information
- Full name: Anna Maria Wysokińska
- Nationality: Polish
- Born: 17 June 1987 (age 39) Wrocław, Poland
- Height: 1.82 m (6 ft 0 in)

Sport
- Sport: Handball
- Position: Goalkeeper
- Current club: Yenimahalle Bld. SK
- Number: 16

Senior clubs
- Years: Team
- -2003: MKS Vitaral Jelfa Jelenia Góra
- 2003-2006: Sośnica Gliwice
- 2006-2009: Łącznościowiec Szczecin
- 2009-2012: SPR Lublin
- 2012-2013: SV Union Halle-Neustadt
- 2013-2015: SG BBM Bietigheim
- 2015-2017: Yenimahalle Bld. SK
National team
Years	Team	Apps	(Gls)
2011-2017	Poland	47	(0)

Anna Wysokińska (born 17 June 1987) is a Polish former handball player. She retired in 2017 while playing for the Turkish club Yenimahalle Bld. SK. She played for the Polish national team between 2011 and 2017, reaching 47 caps and represented Poland at the 2013 World Women's Handball Championship in Serbia.
