= Açelya (name) =

Açelya is a Turkish feminine given name that means "Azalea". Notable people with the name include:

- Açelya Kaya (born 2003), Turkish handball player
- Açelya Topaloğlu (born 1986), Turkish actress
