= 2015–16 Women's EHF Champions League qualifying =

== Seedings ==
The seedings were announced on 23 June 2015.

| Pot 1 | Pot 2 | Pot 3 | Pot 4 |
|---|---|---|---|
| (Hungary) Győri Audi ETO KC (Denmark) Team Esbjerg | (Norway) Glassverket IF (Romania) HCM Baia Mare | (Belarus) BNTU Minsk (Netherlands) SERCODAK Dalfsen | (Serbia) RK Radnički Kragujevac (Turkey) Yenimahalle Bld. SK |

== Draw ==
The draw was held on 26 June 2015. The teams played a semifinal and final to determine the last participants. Matches were played on 12 and 13 September 2016.

== Qualification tournament 1 ==
Glassverket IF organized the tournament.

=== Bracket ===
Semifinals
12 September
(Hungary) Győri Audi ETO KC | 42
(Serbia) Kragujevac | 13
12 September
(Norway) Glassverket IF | 26
(Netherlands) SERCODAK Dalfsen | 21

Final
13 September
(Hungary) Győri Audi ETO KC | 30
(Norway) Glassverket IF | 21
Third place
13 September
(Serbia) Kragujevac | 17
(Netherlands) SERCODAK Dalfsen | 23

All times are local (UTC+2).

=== Semifinals ===
| 12 September 2015; 16:30 | Győri Audi ETO KC (Hungary) | 42–13 | (Serbia) Kragujevac | Drammenshallen, Drammen; Attendance: 500; Referees: Mandák, Rudinský (SVK) |
| 12 September 2015; 16:30 | Knedlíková 7 | (20–3) | Janjušević 3 | Drammenshallen, Drammen; Attendance: 500; Referees: Mandák, Rudinský (SVK) |
| 12 September 2015; 16:30 | 3× (yellow card) 2× (suspension) | Report | 2× (yellow card) 8× (suspension) | Drammenshallen, Drammen; Attendance: 500; Referees: Mandák, Rudinský (SVK) |

| 12 September 2015; 19:00 | Glassverket IF (Norway) | 26–21 | (Netherlands) SERCODAK Dalfsen | Drammenshallen, Drammen; Referees: Brunner, Salah (SUI) |
| 12 September 2015; 19:00 | Nørstebø, Wahlquist 9 | (15–8) | Logtenberg, Pavković 5 | Drammenshallen, Drammen; Referees: Brunner, Salah (SUI) |
| 12 September 2015; 19:00 | 3× (yellow card) 1× (suspension) | Report | 2× (yellow card) 1× (suspension) | Drammenshallen, Drammen; Referees: Brunner, Salah (SUI) |

=== Third place game ===
| 13 September 2015; 14:30 | Kragujevac (Serbia) | 17–23 | (Netherlands) SERCODAK Dalfsen | Drammenshallen, Drammen; Attendance: 125; Referees: Brunner, Salah (SUI) |
| 13 September 2015; 14:30 | Janjušević 8 | (8–11) | Van Leeuwen 6 | Drammenshallen, Drammen; Attendance: 125; Referees: Brunner, Salah (SUI) |
| 13 September 2015; 14:30 | 3× (yellow card) 8× (suspension) | Report | 3× (yellow card) 3× (suspension) | Drammenshallen, Drammen; Attendance: 125; Referees: Brunner, Salah (SUI) |

=== Final ===
| 13 September 2015; 17:00 | Győri Audi ETO KC (Hungary) | 30–21 | (Norway) Glassverket IF | Drammenshallen, Drammen; Attendance: 1,005; Referees: Mandák, Rudinský (SVK) |
| 13 September 2015; 17:00 | Groot 8 | (13–15) | Kristiansen 6 | Drammenshallen, Drammen; Attendance: 1,005; Referees: Mandák, Rudinský (SVK) |
| 13 September 2015; 17:00 | 2× (yellow card) 2× (suspension) | Report | 2× (yellow card) 3× (suspension) 1× (red card) | Drammenshallen, Drammen; Attendance: 1,005; Referees: Mandák, Rudinský (SVK) |

== Qualification tournament 2 ==
HCM Baia Mare organized the tournament.

=== Bracket ===
Semifinals
12 September
(Denmark) Team Esbjerg | 32
(Turkey) Yenimahalle Bld. SK | 28
12 September
(Romania) HCM Baia Mare | 31
(Belarus) BNTU Minsk | 21

Final
13 September
(Denmark) Team Esbjerg | 21
(Romania) HCM Baia Mare | 32
Third place
13 September
(Turkey) Yenimahalle Bld. SK | 27
(Belarus) BNTU Minsk | 31

All times are local (UTC+3).

=== Semifinals ===
| 12 September 2015; 13:30 | Team Esbjerg (Denmark) | 32–28 | (Turkey) Yenimahalle Bld. SK | Sala Sporturilor „Lascăr Pană”, Baia Mare; Attendance: 800; Referees: Pavićević, Ražnatović (MNE) |
| 12 September 2015; 13:30 | Polman, Van der Heijden 7 | (16–12) | Özel 8 | Sala Sporturilor „Lascăr Pană”, Baia Mare; Attendance: 800; Referees: Pavićević, Ražnatović (MNE) |
| 12 September 2015; 13:30 | 3× (yellow card) 6× (suspension) | Report | 3× (yellow card) 4× (suspension) | Sala Sporturilor „Lascăr Pană”, Baia Mare; Attendance: 800; Referees: Pavićević, Ražnatović (MNE) |

| 12 September 2015; 16:00 | HCM Baia Mare (Romania) | 31–21 | (Belarus) BNTU Minsk | Sala Sporturilor „Lascăr Pană”, Baia Mare; Attendance: 1,800; Referees: Andorka, Hucker (HUN) |
| 12 September 2015; 16:00 | Abbingh, Geiger 6 | (15–8) | Mazgo, Silitskaya 5 | Sala Sporturilor „Lascăr Pană”, Baia Mare; Attendance: 1,800; Referees: Andorka, Hucker (HUN) |
| 12 September 2015; 16:00 | 3× (yellow card) 4× (suspension) | Report | 2× (yellow card) | Sala Sporturilor „Lascăr Pană”, Baia Mare; Attendance: 1,800; Referees: Andorka, Hucker (HUN) |

=== Third place game ===
| 13 September 2015; 14:00 | Yenimahalle Bld. SK (Turkey) | 27–31 | (Belarus) BNTU Minsk | Sala Sporturilor „Lascăr Pană”, Baia Mare; Attendance: 600; Referees: Andorka, Hucker (HUN) |
| 13 September 2015; 14:00 | Tankaskaya 7 | (14–16) | Mazgo 8 | Sala Sporturilor „Lascăr Pană”, Baia Mare; Attendance: 600; Referees: Andorka, Hucker (HUN) |
| 13 September 2015; 14:00 | 3× (yellow card) 4× (suspension) 1× (red card) | Report | 3× (yellow card) 5× (suspension) | Sala Sporturilor „Lascăr Pană”, Baia Mare; Attendance: 600; Referees: Andorka, Hucker (HUN) |

=== Final ===
| 13 September 2015; 16:30 | Team Esbjerg (Denmark) | 21–32 | (Romania) HCM Baia Mare | Sala Sporturilor „Lascăr Pană”, Baia Mare; Attendance: 2,000; Referees: Pavićević, Ražnatović (MNE) |
| 13 September 2015; 16:30 | Van der Heijden 5 | (9–15) | Ardean-Elisei 9 | Sala Sporturilor „Lascăr Pană”, Baia Mare; Attendance: 2,000; Referees: Pavićević, Ražnatović (MNE) |
| 13 September 2015; 16:30 | 3× (yellow card) 1× (suspension) | Report | 3× (yellow card) 4× (suspension) | Sala Sporturilor „Lascăr Pană”, Baia Mare; Attendance: 2,000; Referees: Pavićević, Ražnatović (MNE) |
