= Beyzanur Türkyılmaz =

Turkish handball player (born 2001)

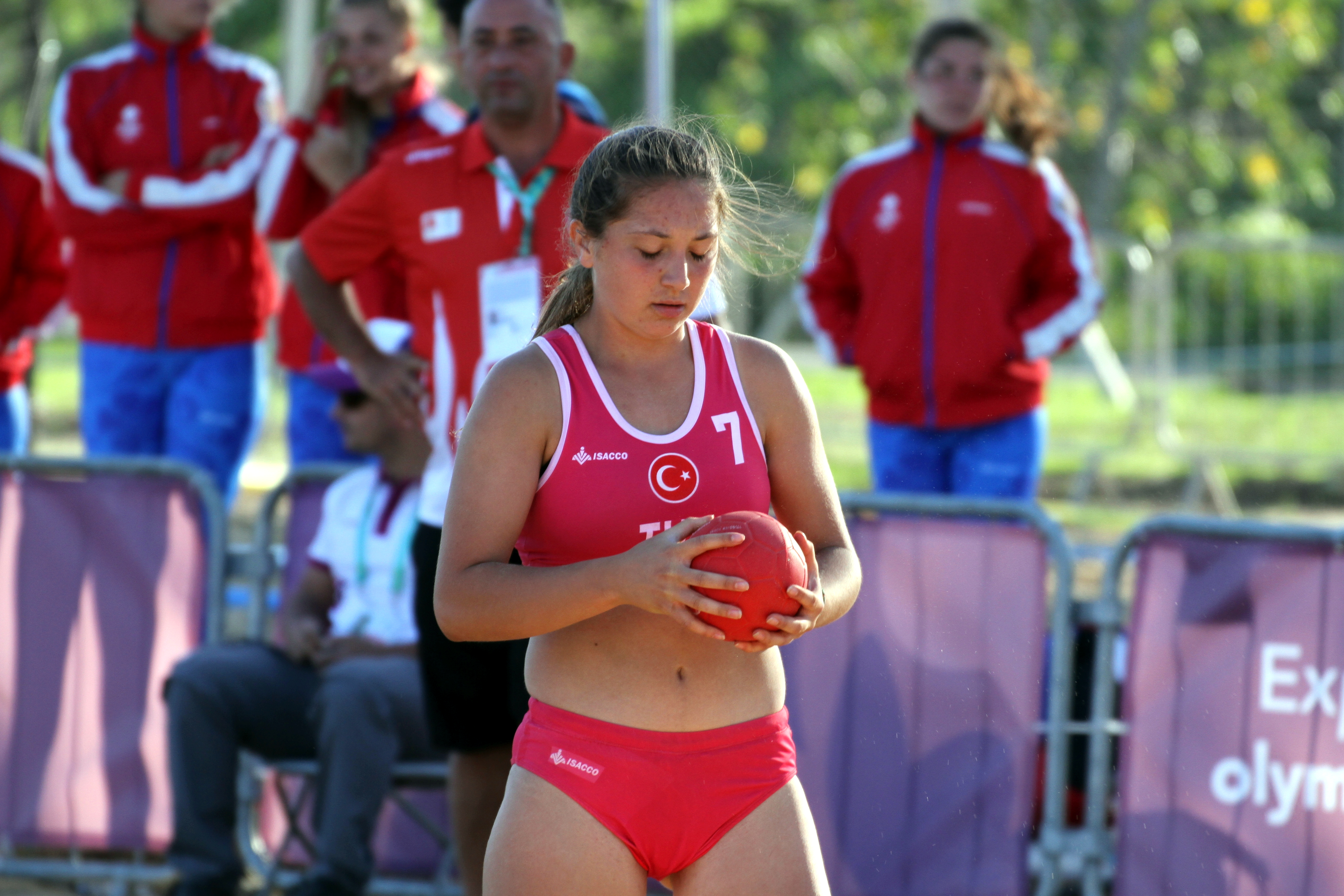
- Beyzanur Türkyılmaz of Turkey women's national youth beach handball team at the 2018 Summer Youth Olympics.

Personal information
- Born: 29 August 2001 (age 25) Eskişehir, Turkey
- Height: 1.65 m (5 ft 5 in)

Sport
- Sport: Handball
- Position: Left wing
- Current club: Adasokağı
- Number: 5

Senior clubs
- Years: Team
- 2016–2018: Eskişehir Hentbol
- 2018–2021: Muratpaşa Bld.
- 2022–2023: Konyaaltı Bld.
- 2023–2024: Kastamonu Bld.
- 2024–: Adasokağı
National team
Years	Team	
–	Turkey U-19	
–	Turkey	
–	Turkey U-19 beach	
–	Turkey beach	(Tarragona)

Beyzanur Türkyılmaz (born 29 August 2001) is a Turkish handballer, who plays in the Turkish Women's Handball Super League for Adasokağı, and the Turkey national beach handball team. She plays in the left wing position.

== Club career ==
Türkyılmaz started her handball playing career at her hometown club Eskişehir Hentbol SK, playing in the Turkish Women's Handball Super League at age 15.

She played for Muratpaşa Bld., before she transferred to Konyaaltı Bld. in the same city by June 2021.

In the 2023–24 Super League season, she played for Kastamonu Bld..

From 2018 to 2024, she took part at EHF Women's European League qualification and EHF Women's European Cup with her clubs.

She transferred to the Adana-based club Adasokağı for the 2023–24 Super League season. Her team finished the play-off as runner-up.

She is 1.65 m (5 ft 5 in) tall and plays as left winger.

== International career ==
In 2016, she was called up to the Turkey women's national under-17 handball team.

== Honours ==
Turkish Women's Handball Super League

Runners-up (3): 2018–19 (Muratpaşa Bld.), 2022–23 (Konyaaltı Bld.), 2024–25 (Adasokağı)

Turkish Women's Handball Cup

Winners (1): 2018–19 (Muratpaşa Bld.)

EHF Women's European Cup

Winners (1): 2022–23 (Konyaaltı Bld.)
