= Cansu Akalın =

Turkish handball player (born 1998)

Personal information
- Nationality: Turkish
- Born: 25 August 1998 (age 28) Ankara, Turkey
- Height: 1.82 m (5 ft 11 1/2 in)

Sport
- Sport: Handball
- Position: Pivot
- Current club: Adasokağı
- Number: 8

Senior clubs
- Years: Team
- 2013–2016: Çankaya Bld. Anka
- 2016–2021: Muratpaşa Bld.
- 2021–2022: Kastamonu Bld.
- 2022–2023: Konyaaltı Bld.
- 2023–2024: Kastamonu Bld.
- 2024–: Adasokağı
National team
- Years: Team
- –: Turkey
Medal record
Representing Turkey
Women's Handball
Islamic Solidarity Games
Gold medal – first place	2021 Konya	Team

Cansu Akalın (born 25 August 1998) is a Turkish handballer, who plays as pivot for Adasokağı in the Turkish Super League and the Turkey national team.

== Personal life ==
Cansu Akalın was born in Ankara, Turkey on 125 August998.

Her twin sister, Selen Akalın, is a handball goalkeeper and national team member.

== Club career ==
Akalın is 1.82 m (6 ft 0 in) tall at 73 kg (161 lb). She plays in the pivot position.

=== Çankaya Bld. Anka ===
Cansu played seven seasons in her hometown club Çankaya Anka Bld. GSK together with her twin sister Selen, who is a goalkeeper. She took part in the 2013–14 EHF Cup.

=== Muratpaşa Bld. ===
For the 2016–17 Turkish Super League season, she went together with her sister to Antalya to join Muratpaşa Bld. SK. She was with Muratpaşa Bld. SK including the 2020–21 season. She played in the 2016–17 EHF Cup, 2018–19 EHF Champions League, 2018–19 EHF Cup, 2019–20 EHF Cup, and 2020–21 EHF European Cup.

=== Kastamonu Bld. ===
In the 2021–22 season, she transferred to Kastamonu Bld.. She played in the 2021–22 EHF Champions League.

=== Konyaaltı Bld. ===
In 2022, she signed a deal with the Antalya-based club Konyaaltı Bld., played in the 2022–23 EHF European Cup, and experienced her team's champion title of the cup. She was named Golden Seven (Turkish: Altın Yedi) member of the 2022–23 Super League season by the Turkey Handball Federation.

=== Kastamonu Bld. ===
After one season, she returned to her former club Kastamonu Bld. in the 2023–24 Super League season.

=== Adasokağı ===
She transferred to the Adana-based club Adasokağı for the 2024–25 Super League season. Her team became runner-up defeated by defending champion Yalaıkavak in the play-off finals by 3-1.

== International career ==
Akalın is a member of the Turkey national team. She took part in the 2022 European Women's Handball Championship qualification matches . In 2022, she played in the national team, which became champion at the 5th Islamic Solidarity Games in Konya, Turkey.

== Honours ==
=== Individual ===
Turkish Women's Handball Super League
Golden Seven member (1): 2022–23 (Konyaaltı Bld.)

=== Club ===
Turkish Women's Handball Super League

Champions (2): 2017–18 (Muratpaşa Bld.), 2021–22 (Kastamonu Bld.)
Runners-up (3): 2018–19 (Muratpaşa Bld.), 2022–23 (Konyaaltı Bld.), 2024–25 (Adasokağı)

Turkish Women's Handball Super Cup

Winners (2): 2018 (Muratpaşa Bld.), 2021 (Kastamonu Bld.)
Runners-up (3): 2019 (Muratpaşa Bld.), 2022 (Konyaaltı Bld.), 2023 (Kastamonu Bld.)

Turkish Women's Handball Cup

Winners (1): 2021–22 (Kastamonu Bld.)

EHF Women's European Cup

Winners (1): 2022–23 (Konyaaltı Bld.)

=== International ===
Turkey women's national handball team

Champions (1): 2021 (Islamic Solidarity Games)
