= Annick Lipman =

Dutch handball player (born 1989)

Personal information
- Nationality: Dutch
- Born: 13 March 1989 (age 37) Zwolle, Netherlands
- Height: 1.78 m (5 ft 10 in)

Sport
- Sport: Handball
- Position: Goalkeeper

Senior clubs
- Years: Team
- 2009–2014: SV Dalfsen Handbal
- 2014–2017: Vipers Kristiansand
- 2017–2019: Gjerpen IF
- 2019–2023: Byåsen HE
- 2024: Molde Elite
National team
| Years | Team | Apps | (Gls) |
| 2014–2019 | Netherlands | 3 | (0) |
Medal record
World Championship
| Gold medal – first place | 2019 Japan |

Annick Lipman (born 13 March 1989) is a former Dutch handball goalkeeper who last played for Molde Elite and the Dutch national team.

Previously, she played for SV Dalfsen Handbal, Vipers Kristiansand and Gjerpen IF. She was a part the Netherlands team that won the 2019 World Women's Handball Championship; the first title in the country's history.

She also played at the 2020 European Championship.

== Achievements ==
- Norwegian League
  - Bronze Medalist: 2019/2020

== Individual awards ==
- All-Star Goalkeeper of Eliteserien: 2019/2020
