= Yaren Berfe Göker =

Turkish handball player (born 1999)

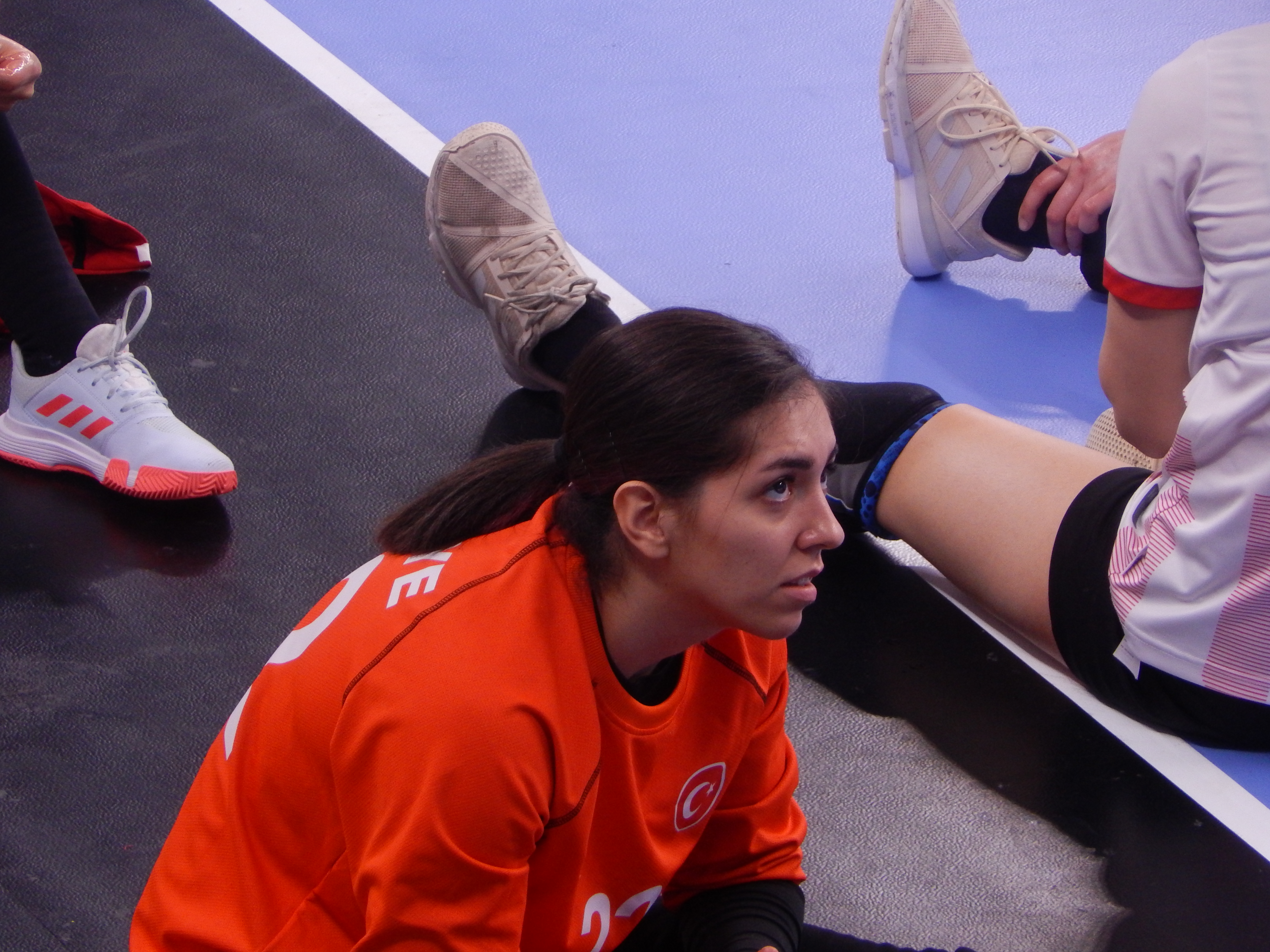
- Yaren Berfe Göker at the 2021 World Women's Handball Championship – European qualification.

Personal information
- Nationality: Turkish
- Born: 5 November 1999 (age 26) Bursa, Turkey
- Height: 1.83 m (6 ft 0 in)

Sport
- Sport: Handball
- Position: Goalkeeper
- Current club: Kastamonu Bld. GSK
- Number: 22

Senior clubs
- Years: Team
- 2018–2019: Osmangazi Bld. SK
- 2098–2022: Üsküdar Bld. SK
- 2022–: Kastamonu Bld. GSK
National team
- Years: Team
- 2018–: Turkey
Medal record
Representing Turkey
Women's handball

Yaren Berfe Göker (5 November 1999) is a Turkish handballer, who plays as goalkeeper for Kastamonu Bld. GSK in the Turkish Super League and the Turkey national team.

== Personal life ==
Yaren Berfe Göker was born in Bursa, Turkey on 5 November 1999.

== Club career ==
Göker is 1.83 m (6 ft 0 in) tall at 70 kg (150 lb). She plays in the goalkeeper position.

She played for Osmangazi Bld. SK in Bursa in the 2018–19 Turkish Women's Handball Super League. For the 2019–20 season, she transferred to the Istanbul-based club Üsküdar Bld. SK. End November 2019, she suffered an anterior cruciate ligament rupture on her right leg, and underwent a reconstructive surgery in Istanbul. In the 2022–23 season, she moved to Jastamonu Bld. GSK. With Kastamonu Bld. GSK, she played at the 2022–23 Women's EHF Champions League. She won the 2022–23 Turkish Super League with her team.

== International career ==
In May 2018, Göker was called up to the preparation camp of the Turkey women's national handball team. She took part in the Mediterranean Games in 2018 in Tarragona, Spain, and in 2022 in Oran, Algeria. She played in the European Women's Handball Championship qualification matches in 2020, and 2022. She took part in the 2021 World Women's Handball Championship – European qualification.

== Honours ==
=== Club ===
Turkish Handball Youth Super League
Kastamonu Bld. GSK

Champions (1): 2022–23
