= Dorina Emilia Carbune =

Romanian female handballer (born 1985)

Personal information
- Nationality: Romanian
- Born: February 22, 1985 (age 41) Cralovăț, Timiş, Romania
- Height: 1.67 m (5 ft 6 in)

Sport
- Sport: Handball
- Position: Right Wing
- Current club: Kastamonu Bld. GSK
- Number: 71

Senior clubs
- Years: Team
- –: Romania

Dorina Emilia Carbune (born February 22, 1985) is a Romanian female handballer, who plays for Kastamonu Bld. GSK and the Romanian national team.

She played in her country for CS Tomis Constanța (2005–2008) before she moved in 2009 to Turkey to join the Istanbul-based club Üsküdar Bld. SK in the Turkish Women's Handball Super League. In 2011, she transferred to Muratpaşa Bld. SK in Antalya. Since 2015, she is with Kastamonu Bld. GSK.
