= Sharina van Dort =

Dutch handball player (born 1988)

Personal information
- Nationality: Dutch
- Born: 18 October 1988 (age 38) Zwolle, Netherlands
- Height: 1.68 m (5 ft 6 in)

Sport
- Sport: Handball
- Position: Left wing
- Current club: Wijhe '92
- Number: 4

Senior clubs
- Years: Team
- -2004: Wijhe '92
- 2004-2006: Olympia Hengelo
- 2006-2010: HV Kwiek
- 2010-2014: SV Dalfsen
- 2014-: Wijhe '92
National team
Years	Team	Apps	(Gls)
–	Netherlands	45	(84)

Sharina van Dort (born 18 October 1988) is a Dutch team handball player. She used to play for the club SV Dalfsen, and on the Dutch national team. She represented the Netherlands at the 2013 World Women's Handball Championship in Serbia, where the Netherlands finished 12th.
