= Selen Akalın =

Turkish handball player (born 1998)

Personal information
- Nationality: Turkish
- Born: 25 August 1998 (age 28) Ankara, Turkey
- Height: 1.71 m (5 ft 7 1/2 in)

Sport
- Sport: Handball
- Position: Goalkeeper
- Current club: Adasokağı
- Number: 1

Senior clubs
- Years: Team
- 2016–2019: Muratpaşa Bld.
- 2019–2024: Yenimahalle Bld.
- 2024–: Adasokağı
National team
- Years: Team
- –: Turkey

Selen Akalın (born 25 August 1998) is a Turkish handballer, who plays as goalkeeper for Adasokağı in the Turkish Super League and the Turkey national team.

== Personal life ==
Selen Akalın was born in Ankara, Turkey on 25 August 1998.

Her twin sister, Cansu Akalın, is a handball pivot and national team member.

== Club career ==
Akalın is 1.71 m (5 ft 7 1/2 in) tall, and plays as goalkeeper.

=== Muratpaşa Bld. ===
Between 2016 and 2019, she played for Muratpaşa Bld. in Antalya. During this time, she took part at the qualification matches of the EHF Women's European League and EHF Women's European Cup.

=== Yenimahalle Bld. ===
In 2019, she transferred to Yenimahalle Bld. in her hometown Ankara, where she was until the end of the 2023–24 Super League season. In April 2021, she underwent a surgey following a meniscus tear.

=== Iuventa Michalovce ===
In June 2024, it was announced that she signed a deal with the Slovak club MSK Iuventa Michalovce.

=== Adasokağı ===
She joined the Adana-based club Adasokağı for the 2024–25 Super League season. Her team became runner-up defeated by the defending champion Yalaıkavak in the play-off finals by 3-1.

== International career ==
Akalın is a member of the Turkey national team.

== Honours ==
Turkish Women's Handball Super League

Champions (1): 2017–18 (Muratpaşa Bld.)
Runners-up (3): 2018–19 (Muratpaşa Bld.), 2023–24 (Yenimahalle Bld.),

2024–25 (Adasokağı)

Third places (1): 2020–21 (Yenimahalle Bld.)

Turkish Women's Handball Cup

Winners (1): 2018–19 (Muratpaşa Bld.)
Runners-up (1): 2016–17 (Muratpaşa Bld.)
