= Yasemin Güler =

Turkish women's handballer (born 1994)

Personal information
- Born: April 10, 1994 (age 32) Konak, Izmir, Turkey
- Height: 1.74 m (5 ft 9 in)

Sport
- Sport: Handball
- Position: Right Wing
- Current club: Kastamonu Bld. GSK
- Number: 18
National team
- Years: Team
- –: Turkey

Yasemin Güler (born April 10, 1994) is a Turkish women's handballer, who plays in the Turkish Women's Handball Super League for Kastamonu Bld. GSK, and the Turkey national team. The 1.74 m (5 ft 9 in)-tall sportswoman plays in the right wing position.

== Playing career ==
=== Club ===
Güler plays for her hometown club İzmir Büyükşehir Belediyesi SK in the Turkish Women's Handball Super League. She took part in the EHF Cup Winners' Cup (2011–12 and 2012–13) as well as at the Women's EHF Challenge Cup (2014–15 and 2015–16).

=== International ===
Güler played in 2014 for the Turkey women's U-20 team. Later, she was invited to the Turkey women's national handball team. She was part of the national squad that competed at the European Women's Handball Championship qualification in 2014, and 2016.
