= Andrea Beleska =

Macedonian handball player

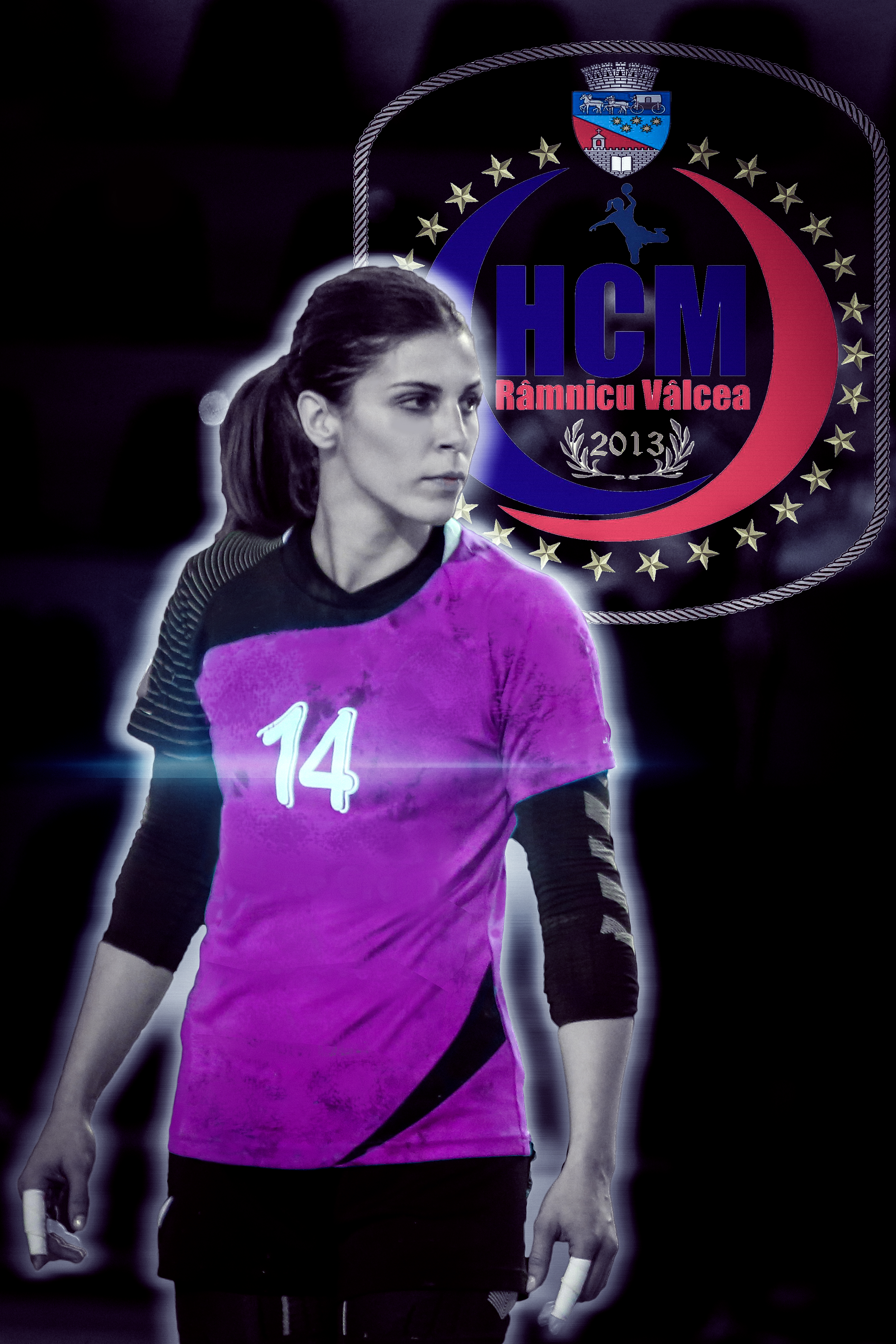

Personal information
- Nationality: Macedonian
- Born: 3 January 1994 (age 32) Kicevo, Macedonia
- Height: 1.80 m (5 ft 11 in)

Sport
- Sport: Handball
- Position: Right Back
- Number: 14
National team
- Years: Team
- –: Macedonia

Andrea Beleska (born 3 January 1994 in Kicevo) is a Macedonian handballer who plays for Yenimahalle Belediyesi SK and the Macedonian national team.

In 2014, she was voted best women's Macedonian handball player by MakRakomet.

- HCM Metalurg, CUP WINNERS' CUP 2015–16, 17 goals
- Macedonian national team Euro WOMEN Qualification 2016
