= Anastasia Sinitsyna =

Russian handball player (born 1983)

Personal information
- Nationality: Russian
- Born: September 3, 1983 (age 43) Rostov-on-Don, Russian SFSR
- Height: 1.82 m (6 ft 0 in)

Sport
- Sport: Handball
- Position: Left Back
- Current club: Kastamonu Bld. GSK
- Number: 30

Senior clubs
- Years: Team
- –: Russia

Anastasia Sinitsyna (born Russian: Анастасия Синицына; September 3, 1983) is a Russian female handballer, who plays for Kastamonu Bld. GSK and the Russian national team.

Sinitsyna played in her country for Rostselmash Rostov (2001–2002) and Rostov-Don (2002–2007) before she moved in 2007 to Ukraine to join HC Galychanka, where she was two seasons. In 2008, she returned home and played for HC Kuban Krasnodar (2008–2010). In 2011, Sinitsyna transferred to the Ankara-based team Maliye Milli Piyango SK to play in the Turkish Women's Handball Super League. After one season, she joined Maltepe Bld. GSK in Istanbul. From 2015 on, she is with Kastamonu Bld. GSK.
