= Kübra Yılmaz =

Turkish handball player

Personal information
- Born: 8 January 1991 (age 35) Erzurum, Turkey
- Height: 1.70 m (5 ft 7 in)

Sport
- Sport: Handball
- Position: Right Wing
- Current club: Ardeşen GSK
- Number: 4
National team
- Years: Team
- –: Turkey

Kübra Yılmaz (born 8 January 1991) is a Turkish women's handballer, who plays in the Turkish Women's Handball Super League for Ardeşen GSK, and the Turkey national team. The 1.70 m (5 ft 7 in)-tall sportswoman plays in the right wing position.

Between 2010 and 2013, she played for Muratpaşa Bld. SK.
