= Kateryna Chumak =

Ukrainian handball player (born 1988)

Personal information
- Nationality: Ukrainian
- Born: December 7, 1988 (age 37) Zaporizhzhia, Ukraine
- Height: 1.73 m (5 ft 8 in)

Sport
- Sport: Handball
- Position: Right wing
- Current club: Yenimahalle Bld. SK
- Number: 9

Senior clubs
- Years: Team
- 2005-2009: HC Motor Zaporizhzhia
- 2009-2011: Zaporizhzhia-ZSEA
- 2012-2013: Nowy Sonz (Poland)
- 2013-2014: Muratpaşa Bld. SK (Turkey)
- 2014-2018: Yenimahalle Bld. SK
- 2018-2019: Mardin B.B SK
National team
Years	Team	Apps	(Gls)
2011-2018	Ukraine	27	(52)
Medal record
Turkish champion (2013-2014),( 2014-2015),(2015-2016)

Kateryna Chumak (born Ukrainian: Катерина Чумак; December 7, 1988) is a Ukrainian handball player for Yenimahalle Bld. SK and the Ukrainian national team.

She played for HC Motor Zaporizhzhia (2005–2009) and Zaporizhzhia-ZSEA (2009–2011) in her country, in Poland (2012-2013) Nowy Sonz before she moved in 2013 to the Turkish team Muratpaşa Bld. SK, where she played one season. Currently she is with the Ankara-based Yenimahalle Bld. SK.
