= Adasokağı SK =

Turkish handball club

- Full name: Adasokağı Spor Kulübü
- Founded: 17 May 2016; 10 years ago
- Arena: Yüreğir Serinevler Arena
- President: Alper Tunga Kalsın
- Head coach: (Turkey) Nesimi Dağdoğan
- League: Turkish Women's Handball Super League
- 2024–25: 2nd
- Club colours

Location of Adasokağı SK in Turkey

Adasokağı SK (Turkish: Adasokağı Spor Kulübü), TotemCard Adasokağı SK for sponsorship reasons, is a women's handball club based in Seyhan district of Adana Province, Turkey. The team competes in the Turkish Super League. Club colours are red, black and white. Club president is Alper Tunga Kalsın.

== Location ==
Adasokağı SK is located on 36020 Sok. 5/B in Yeşilyuva neighborhood of Seyhan district in Adana, southern Turkey.

== Arena ==
Adasokağı SK play their home matches at Yüreğir Serinevler Arena located in Serinevler neighborhood of Yüreğir district in Adana.

== History ==
Encouraged by Nesimi Dağdoğan, some selected girls of Adasokağı Primary School, who were living in a neighborhood at social risk in Seyhan, Adana, started playing handball in the earth schoolyard in 2014. The trainings continued later on concrete court. The team members were transported to away matches by the means of the school people while the needed food was provided by family members.

The girls' handball team of the Adasokağı Middle School won the Turkish Championship. This accomplishment led to the foundation of the women's handball club Adasokağı on 17 May 2016 by DağDoğan, who took the president post. The club president enabled the team players' transfer from the small public school to a private high school on full scholarship. In the early years, all team players were students and from the same neighborhood, the oldest player being a high school student.

The team started to compete in the lowest-level Turkish Women's Handball Second League. They were then promoted to the Women's First League. The team finished the Group A of the 2021–22 Women's First League season on the second place, and was promoted to the Women's Super League after winning the play-offs in Alanya in April 2022. They became the youngest team in the league. To strengthen the team for the top-level league, two young domestic players were transferred.

The club signed a deal with the company owning TotemCard, an internet shopping card, and prefixed its club title as TotemCard Adasolağı SK. The Adana-based Turkish bus and truck manufacturer TEMSA undertook transportation sponsorship of the team, which had already signed a general sponsorship before the beginning of the 2022–23 Women's Super League season.

In April 2022, the team won also the Turkish Intra-High School Championship. Three team members were selected to the Turkey women's national under-16 handball team, and participated at national preparation camp for the 2022 Mediterranean Handball Conference in Montenegro.

=== 2023–24 season ===
The club suspended its right to play in the Women's Super League after the 2023 earthquake in Turkey occurred on 6 February 2023, causing damage in Adana.

=== 2024–25 season ===
The team completed the recovery process and returned to the Super League in the 2024–25 season. The team, coached by Dağdoğan, finished the first half of the league season on the third place. At the end of the normal league season, they were in Final Fours. After defeating Bursa Büyükşehir Bld. by 2–0 in total. In the finals, they played against the defending champion Yalıkavak. Adasokağı lost the playoffs by 3–1 at the end, although they had achieved equality after the second match of the series. Yalıkavak once again became champion and Adasokağı took second place.

=== 2025–26 season ===
In June 2025, it was announced that the club was drawn from the Super League by the Turkish Handball Federation due to economic problems of the club.

== Former technical staff ==
- Head coach: Nesimi Dağdoğan

== Former notable players ==
- Turkey
  - Cansu Akalın
  - Selen Akalın
  - Sümeyye Durdu
  - Gülcan Tügel
  - Beyzanur Türkyılmaz

== Honours ==
Turkish Women's Handball Super League
Runners-up (1): 2024–25

== Kit history ==
{ 2024–25 home	2024–25 away
