= Ayşe Dinç =

Turkish former handball player (born 1999)

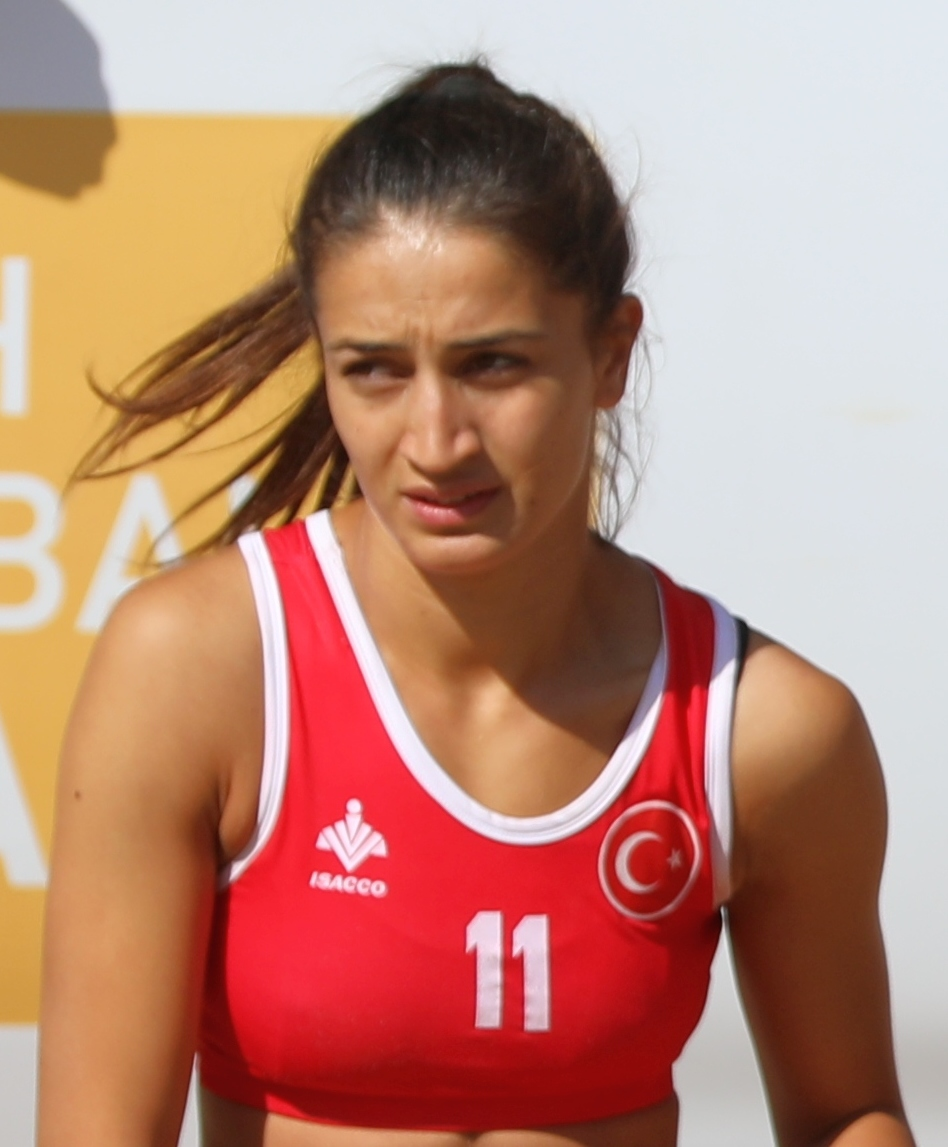
- Dinç with the Turkey national beach handball team in 2019

Personal information
- Born: 12 March 1999 (age 27) Diyarbakıri, Turkey

Sport
- Sport: Handball
- Position: Left back

Senior clubs
- Years: Team
- 2011–2013: Konyaaltı Bld. SK
- 2013–2019: Muratpaşa Bld. SK
- 2020–2021: Konyaaltı Bld. SK
- 2021–2023: Antalya Anadolu SK
National team
- Years: Team
- 2019–2021: Turkey
Medal record
Representing Turkey
Women's Beach handball

Ayşe Dinç (born 12 March 1999) is a Turkish former handball player who played as left back. She was a member of the Turkey national beach handball team. After she quit playing handball, she started to work as a tennis coach.

== Early years ==
Dinç was initially not allowed to attend practice and play handball after school because of her father. She secretly joined practice, and caught the coach's attention, who then contacted her father together with her paternal uncle, and persuaded him. She promised that her sports activity would not interfere her study. She focused intensely on her training, and found motivation in sports following her parents' separation.

== Club career ==
She started her handball career in 2011 at the local club Konyaaltı Bld. SK, nicknamed the "Blue Butterflies" in Antalya, playing in the left back position. From 2013 until 2019, she was part of Muratpaşa Bld. SK in the same city. Her team finished the 2017–18 season as Super League champion.

She played at the EHF Women's Cup Winners' Cup 2013/14, EHF Women's Champions Leagu in 2013–14, 2018–19 and Women's EHF Cup in 2015–16, 2016–17, 2018–19, 2019–20. In the 2020–21 season, she played for her former club Konyaaltı Bld. SK, which was promoted to the Turkish Super League. Her contract was terminated after the season in June 2021. Between 2021 and 2023, she was with Antalya Anadolu SK.

== International career ==
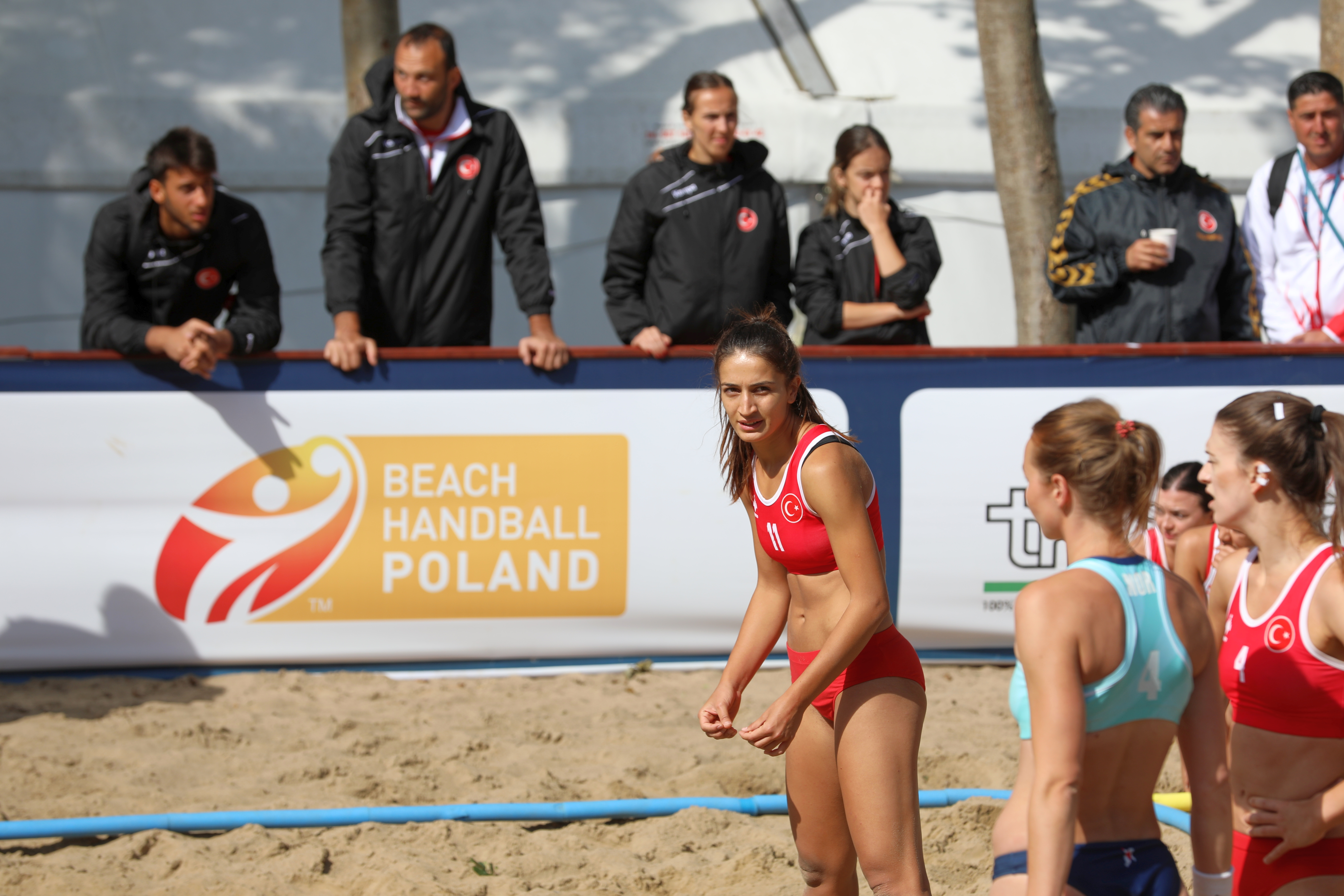
Ayşe Dinç of Turkey] national beach handball team (#11) at the 2019 European Beach Handball Championship match against Norway women's national beach handball teamNorway.

Dinç became a member of the national beach handball team. She played at the preliminary round of the 2019 European Beach Handball Championship. She was part of the national team at the 2021 European Beach Handball Championship in Varna, Bulgaria.

== Coaching career ==
After she stopped playing handball, Dinç started a career as a sports trainer and instructor for individual sportspeople in tennis and football by combining the 12-year long experience gained from her background as an athlete with scientific training principles. She served as a coach at the tennis club Nashira in 2024, and continıes to conduct training as a strength and conditioning coach at the club Olympos Tennis in Antalya.

== Personal life ==
Dinç was born in Diyarbakır, southeastern Turkey on 12 March 1999. She lives in Antalya, southwestern Turkey.

She studied Sports science at Akdeniz University in Antalya.
