= Maja Kožnjak =

Croatian handball player (born 1985)

Personal information
- Nationality: Croatian
- Born: 16 April 1985 (age 41) Virovitica, SR Croatia, SFR Yugoslavia
- Height: 1.72 m (5 ft 8 in)

Sport
- Sport: Handball
- Position: Left back
- Current club: Kastamonu Bld. GSK
- Number: 4
National team
| Years | Team | Apps | (Gls) |
| – | Croatia | 74 | (75) |

Maja Kožnjak (born 16 April 1985) is a Croatian handball player for Kastamonu Bld. GSK and the Croatian national team.

She played in her country for CRO ZRK "Tvin Trgocentar" Virovitica (2003–2004), RK Podravka Koprivnica (2005–2012) and RK Lokomotiva Zagreb(2012–2015 ) before she moved to the Antalya-based club Muratpaşa Bld. SK to play in the Turkish Women's Handball Super League. After one season, she transferred to Kastamonu Bld. GSK.
