= Anita Gaće =

Croatian handball player (born 1983)

Personal information
- Nationality: Croatian
- Born: 14 April 1983 (age 43) Split, SR Croatia, SFR Yugoslavia
- Height: 1.77 m (5 ft 10 in)

Sport
- Sport: Handball
- Position: Right wing

Senior clubs
- Years: Team
- 1997–2000: RK Makarska
- 2000–2005: ŽRK Osijek
- 2005–2013: RK Podravka
- 2013–2014: RK Lokomotiva Zagreb
- 2014–2015: Dinamo Volgograd
- 2015–2017: Yenimahalle Bld. SK
National team
Years	Team	Apps	(Gls)
–	Croatia	142	(188)

Anita Gaće (born 14 April 1983) is a retired Croatian handballer who was last played for Yenimahalle Bld. SK and the Croatian national team.

After winning many Croatian championship and Croatian cup trophies in the past years, Gaće started the 2011–2012 in superb form. Beside excellent performances on various preparation tournaments, she was selected to the dream team as best right wing of tournament in Metković, where Podravka played against Slovenian champions RK Krim, Montenegrin champions ŽRK Budućnost, Serbian champions RK Zaječar and Macedonian champions ŽRK Metalurg.

== Achievements ==
- Women's Regional Handball League
  - Gold: 2008/2009
  - Silver: 2009/2010, 2010/2011
- Croatian Championship
  - Gold: 2005/2006, 2006/2007, 2007/2008, 2008/2009, 2009/2010 and 2010/2011
- Croatian Cup
  - Gold: 2005/2006, 2007/2008, 2008/2009, 2009/2010 and 2010/2011
