= Łącznościowiec Szczecin =

Polish women's handball team

Łącznościowiec Szczecin is a Polish women's handball team, based in Szczecin.

== See also ==
- Handball in Poland
- Sports in Poland
