= Lenche Ilkova =

Macedonian handball player

Personal information
- Nationality: Macedonian
- Born: 4 October 1984 (age 42) Strumica, Republic of Macedonia
- Height: 1.87 m (6 ft 2 in)

Sport
- Sport: Handball
- Position: Line Player
- Current club: Yenimahalle Bld. SK
- Number: 88
National team
Years	Team	Apps	(Gls)
–	Macedonia	27	(51)

Lenche Ilkova (born Macedonian: Ленче Илкова; October 4, 1984) is a Macedonian female handball player for Yenimahalle Bld. SK and the Macedonian national team.

She played for RK Mladost (2002–2003), urostandard GP Skopje (2003–2006), Kometal Gjorče Petrov Skopje (2007–2009) in her country before she moved in 2010 to Antalya, Turkey to join Muratpaşa Bld. SK in the Turkish Women's Handball Super League, where she was for one season. After playing two seasons with Üsküdar Bld. SK in Istanbul (2011–2013), she transferred to the Ankara-based Yenimahalle Bld. SK.
