= Tamara Bösch =

Austrian handball player (born 1989)

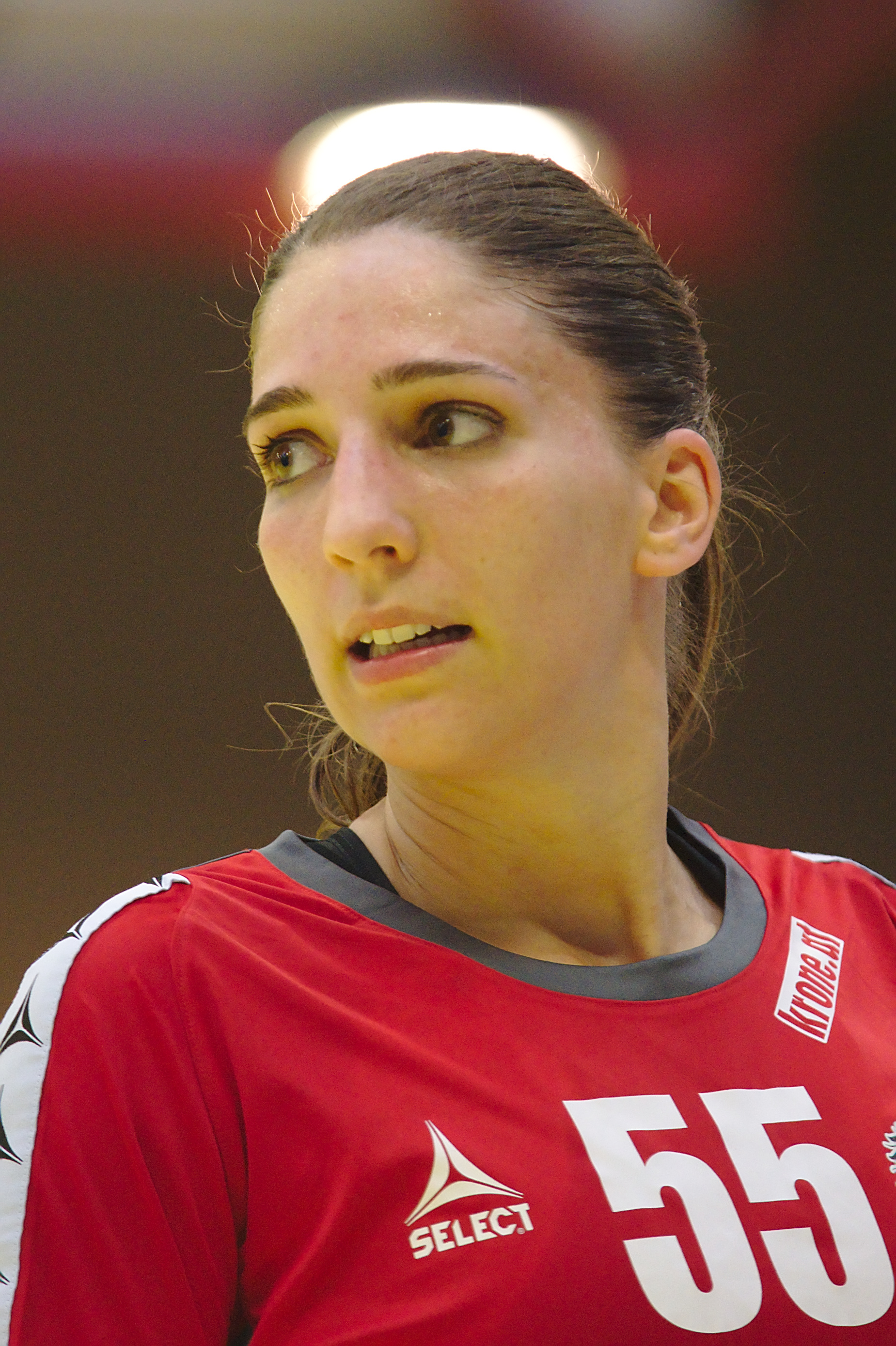

Personal information
- Full name: Tamara Bösch
- Nationality: Austrian
- Born: 5 June 1989 (age 37) Lustenau, Austria
- Height: 1.74 m (5 ft 9 in)

Sport
- Sport: Handball
- Position: Right Back
- Current club: HC Leipzig
- Number: 55

Senior clubs
- Years: Team
- –2008: HC Lustenau
- 2008–2016: LC Brühl Handball
- 2016-2017: HC Leipzig
- 2017-2018: HC Rödertal
National team
Years	Team	Apps	(Gls)
2006–2018	Austria	50	(60)
- Updated on 8 August 2019

Tamara Bösch (born 5 June 1989 in Lustenau) is an Austrian former handballer who played for the Austrian national team.

== Career ==
Bösch started her career at the Austrian club HC Lustenau, where she played with her sister, Amanda Bösch. In 2008 she joined Swiss team LC Brühl Handball. Here she won the 2009, 2011 and 2012 Swiss championship and the 2009, 2010, 2012 and 2016 Swiss Cup. She 2016 she joined the German Bundesliga team HC Leipzig. When HC Leipzig went bankrupt in 2017 she joined newly promoted team HC Rödertal. Due to a Cartilage injury she retired after the 2017–18 season.

She debuted for the Austrian national team on 13 October 2006 against Russia.

== Achievements ==
- Swiss Championship:
  - Winner: 2009, 2011
- Swiss Cup:
  - Winner: 2009, 2010
