= Neslihan Yakupoğlu =

Turkish handball player

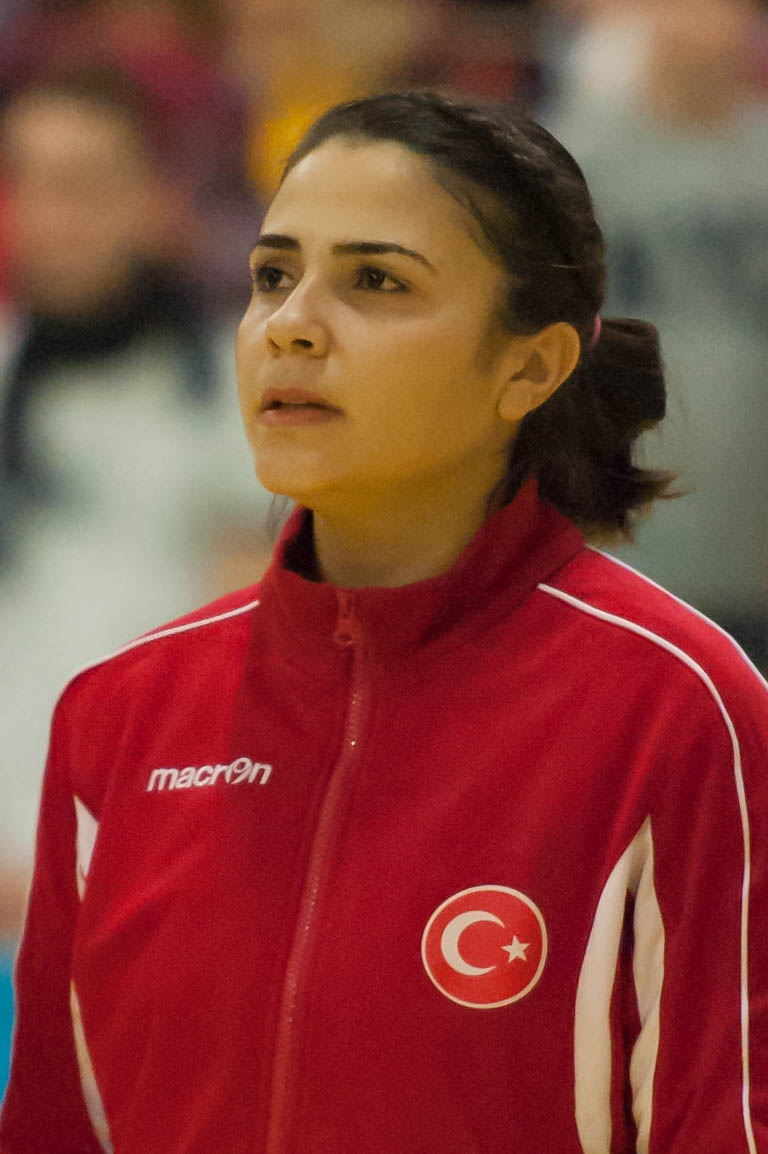
- Neslihan Yakupoğlu at the 2015 World Women's Handball Championship qualification.

Personal information
- Born: September 26, 1990 (age 36) Kastamonu, Turkey
- Height: 1.72 m (5 ft 8 in)

Sport
- Sport: Handball
- Position: Line Player
- Current club: Ardeşen GSK
- Number: 10
National team
- Years: Team
- –: Turkey

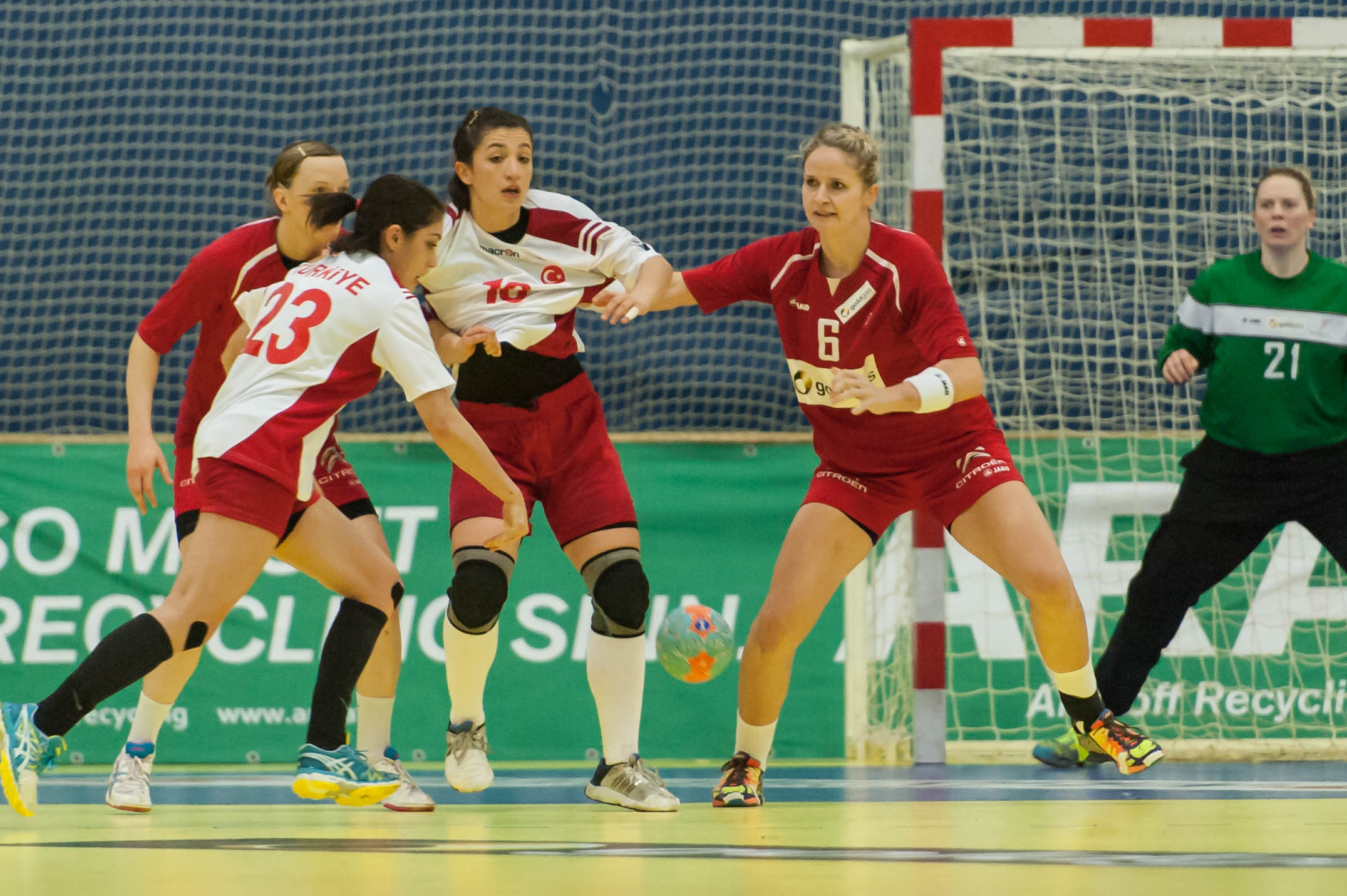
Neslihan Yakupoğlu (white/red mid) struggling against Austria at the 2015 World Women's Handball Championship European qualification match.

Neslihan Yakupoğlu (born September 26, 1990) is a Turkish women's handballer, who plays in the Turkish Women's Handball Super League for Ardeşen GSK, and the Turkey national team. The 1.72 m (5 ft 8 in)-tall sportswoman plays as a line player.

She played for Kastamonu Türk Telekom (2009–2010) and Maliye Milli Piyango SK (2010–2012) before she joined Ardeşen GSK in 2013.
