= Açelya Kaya =

Turkish handball player (born 2003)

Personal information
- Born: 10 June 2003 (age 23) Kırşehir, Turkey
- Height: 1.70 m (5 ft 7 in)

Sport
- Sport: Handball
- Position: Center back
- Current club: Yenimahalle Bld.
- Number: 84

Senior clubs
- Years: Team
- 2022–: Yenimahalle Bld.
National team
- Years: Team
- 2025–: Turkey
Medal record
Representing Turkey
Women's Handball
Islamic Solidarity Games
Gold medal – first place	2025 Riyadh	Team

Açelya Kaya (born 10 June 2003) is a Turkish women's handballer, who plays as center back in the Turkish Women's Handball Super League for Yenimahalle Bld. and the Turkey national team.

== Club career ==
Kaya is a member of Yenimahalle Bld. in Ankara. Her team finished the 2023–24 Super League season as runners-up. She played at the 2023–24 Women's EHF European Cup and 2024–25 Women's EHF European League.

She is 1.70 m (5 ft 7 in) tall and plays in the center back position.

== International career ==
Kaya was part of the national team, which won the gold medal at the 2025 Islamic Solidarity Games in Riyadh, Saudi Arabia.

== Personal life ==
Açelya Kaya was born in Kırşehir, Turkey, on 10 Juney 2003.

== Honours ==
=== Club ===
Turkish Women's Handball Super League

Yenimahalle Bld.
Runners-up (1): 2023–24

=== International ===
Turkey women's national handball team

Islamic Solidarity Games
Champions (1): 2025
