= Tanja Vučković =

Serbian handball player (born 1981)

Personal information
- Nationality: Serbian
- Born: 22 June 1981 (age 45) Sombor, Yugoslavia
- Height: 1.78 m (5 ft 10 in)

Sport
- Sport: Handball
- Position: Back
- Current club: Zağnos SK
- Number: 17
National team
- Years: Team
- –: Serbia

Tanja Vučković (Serbian Cyrillic: Тања Вучковић; born 22 June 1981) is a Serbian female handballer playing in the Turkish Women's Handball Super League for Zağnos SK and the Serbian national team. The 1.78 m (5 ft 10 in)-tall sportswoman plays in the back position.

Vučković played in her country for Jugopetrol Radn (2001–2004), RK Lasta (2005–2006) and ŽRK Zaječar (2010–2013) before she moved to Turkey to join the Antalya-based Muratpaşa Bld. SK in the 2014–15 season of the Women's Super League. After one season, she transferred to Ardeşen GSK in Rize and since summer 2017 she plays for Zağnos SK.

She played at the 2015–16 Women's EHF Cup Winners' Cup for Ardeşen GSK.
