= Yenimahalle Belediyesi SK =

- Full name: Ankara Yenimahalle Belediyesi Spor Kulübü
- Founded: 1986
- Owner: Municipality of Ankara
- Website: http://sporkulubu.yenimahalle.bel.tr

Yenimahalle Belediyesi SK (Turkish: Yenimahalle Belediyesi Spor Kulübü) is a multi-sports club established 1986 in Ankara, Turkey and sponsored by the Municipality of Yenimahalle. The club is best known for its women's handball team.

The club has sports branches in football, basketball, handball, boxing, kickboxing, Muay Thai, athletics and swimming.
