= Olga Laiuk =

Ukrainian handball player (born 1984)

Personal information
- Nationality: Ukrainian
- Born: 17 May 1984 (age 42) Kyiv, Ukraine
- Height: 1.82 m (6 ft 0 in)

Sport
- Sport: Handball
- Position: Right back
- Current club: Kastamonu Bld. GSK
- Number: 2
National team
Years	Team	Apps	(Gls)
–	Ukraine	27	(51)

Olga Laiuk (born Ukrainian: Ольга Лаюк; 17 May 1984) is a Ukrainian handballer player for Kastamonu Bld. GSK and the Ukrainian national team.

She played for HC Spartak Kyiv (2001–2007) and HC Motor Zaporizhzhia (2007–2009) in her country before she moved to Spain to join BM Parc Sagunt. In 2011, she transferred to the Turkish team Muratpaşa Bld. SK, where she played 2015. Currently, she plays for Kastamonu Bld. GSK.
