= Fabienne Logtenberg =

Dutch handball player (born 1991)

Personal information
- Nationality: Dutch
- Born: 27 December 1991 (age 34) Deventer, Netherlands
- Height: 1.81 m (5 ft 11 in)

Sport
- Sport: Handball
- Position: Pivot
- Number: 3

Senior clubs
- Years: Team
- 2008-2017: SV Dalfsen
National team
Years	Team	Apps	(Gls)
–	Netherlands	22	(22)

Fabienne Logtenberg (born 27 December 1991) is a former Dutch team handball player.

She played for the club SV Dalfsen her entire career, where she won the Dutch Women's Handball Championship 6 times in a row from 2011 to 2016, as well as the Cup in 2012, 2013, 2014, 2015 and 2017. She also played on the Dutch national team. She represented the Netherlands at the 2013 World Women's Handball Championship in Serbia, where the Netherlands finished 12th.
