= Muratpaşa Bld. SK (women's handball) =

- Full name: Muratpaşa Belediyesi Spor Kulübü
- Club colours

Muratpaşa Belediyesi SK (Turkish: Muratpaşa Belediyesi Spor Kulübü) is the women's handball team of the same named club sponsored by the Municipality of Muratpaşa in Antalya, Turkey. Club colors are orange, navy and white.

== Competitions ==
=== Domestic ===
The team finished the 2010–11 season ranking at third place. Subsequently, they became three times champion of the Turkish Handball Super League in serie. At the end of the 2014–15 season, Muratpaşa Bld. SK lost the final play-offs to Yenimahalle Bld. SK and became runner-up.

=== International ===
They won the semifinals at the 2011–12 Women's EHF Challenge Cup defeating the French team CJF Fleury by 67–68 in total. Muratpaşa Bld. S played the semifinals at the 2014–15 Women's EHF Cup, lost however to the Danish Team Tvis Holstebro by 49–67 in total. In 2014, they took part at the 2014 Bucharest Trophy without success. The team failed to advance to the quarterfinals at the 2015–16 Women's EHF Cup losing to the German HC Leipzig by 51–69 in the knockout stage.

== European record ==
Season	Competition	Round	Club	1st leg	2nd leg	Aggregate
2010–11	Women's EHF Challenge Cup	M	(Portugal) Juvelis	29–17	25–19	W 54–36
2010–11	Women's EHF Challenge Cup	QF	(Ukraine) HC Spartak Kyiv	31–20	23–29	W 54–49
2010–11	Women's EHF Challenge Cup	SF	(Netherlands) HandbalAcademie	33–32	42–35	W 75–67
2010–11	Women's EHF Challenge Cup	F	(France) Mios Biganos	26–31	29–30	L 55–61
2011–12	Women's EHF Challenge Cup	M	(Czech Republic) Sokol Pisek	37–31	37–29	W 74–60
2011–12	Women's EHF Challenge Cup	QF	(Ukraine) HC Podatkova University	41–31	34–25	W 75–56
2011–12	Women's EHF Challenge Cup	SF	(France) Fleury Loiret HB	29–30	39–37	W 68–67
2011–12	Women's EHF Challenge Cup	F	(France) H.A.C. Handball	27–36	30–27	L 57–63
2012/13	EHF Women's Cup Winners' Cup	R2	(Croatia) RK Lokomotiva Zagreb	34–28	21–27	D 55–55
2012–13	EHF Champions League qualifying	G3	(Romania) Universitatea Cluj			L 26–34
2012–13	EHF Champions League qualifying	G3	(Serbia) RK Zaječar			L 27–35
2013/14	EHF Women's Cup Winners' Cup	R3	(Portugal) Juve Lis	32–18	33–23	W 65–41
2013/14	EHF Women's Cup Winners' Cup	R3	(Russia) Rostov-Don	24–26	19–39	L 43–65
2013–14	EHF Champions League	QR1	(Netherlands) SERCODAK Dalfsen	31–34	24–34	L 55–68
2014–15	EHF Cup	R3	(Belgium) Fémina Visé	37–20	25–21	W 62–41
2014–15	EHF Cup	L16	(Spain) BM Bera Bera	30–30	29–27	W 59–57
2014–15	EHF Cup	QF	(Germany) Buxtehuder SV	25–31	28–18	W 53–49
2014–15	EHF Cup	SF	(Denmark) Tvis Holstebro	25–38	24–29	L 49–67
2015–16	EHF Cup	R3	(Ukraine) HC Galychanka	28–22	30–30	W 58–52
2015–16	EHF Cup	L16	(Germany) HC Leipzig	26–33	25–26	L 51–59
2016–17	EHF Cup Qualification	QR1	(Lithuania) ACME-Žalgiris Kaunas	30–27	25–24	W 55–51
2016–17	EHF Cup Qualification	QR2	(Denmark) Randers HK	20–30	13–26	L 33–56
2018–19	EHF Cup Qualification	QR1	(Sweden) H 65 Höör	25–31	26–31	L 51–62
2018–19	EHF Champions League qualifying	SF	(Croatia) RK Podravka Koprivnica			L 22–35
2018–19	EHF Champions League qualifying	P3	(Serbia) ŽORK Jagodina			L 24–26
2020–21	EHF Cup Qualification	QR1	(Greece) P.A.O.K.	25–32	24–24	L 49–56
2020–21	EHF European Cup	R2	(Italy) Cassano Magnago HC	10–0	10–0	W 20–0
2020–21	EHF European Cup	R3	(Kosovo) FC Ferizaj	40–15	32–16	W 72–31
2020–21	EHF European Cup	L16	(Turkey) Yalıkavak SK	20–39	26–28	L 46–67

== Former notable players ==
Azerbaijan

- Marina Tankaskaya (born 1983)

Croatia

- Maja Kožnjak (born 1985)

,North Macedonia

- Lenche Ilkova (born 1984)

Romania

- Dorina Emilia Carbune (born 1985)
- Anca Mihaela Rombescu (born 1985)

Serbia

- Tanja Vučković (born 1981)

Turkey

- Sevilay İmamoğlu Öcal (born 1984)
- Serpil İskenderoğlu (born 1982)
- Gonca Nahcıvanlı (born 1979)
- Esin Sağdıç (born 1988)
- Ayşenur Sormaz (born 2000)
- Yasemin Şahin (born 1988
- Derya Tınkaoğlu (born 1988)
- Perihan Topaloğlu (born 1987)
- Çağla Yaman (born 1981)
- Betül Yılmaz (born 1988)
- Kübra Yılmaz (born 1991)
- Ayşe Dinç (born 1999)

Ukraine

- Kateryna Chumak (born 1988)
- Olga Laiuk (born 1984)

== Honours ==
Turkish Handball Super League

- Winners (4): 2011–12, 2012–13, 2013–14, 2017–2018.
- Runners-up (1): 2014–15.
- Third places (1): 2010–11.
