= SV Dalfsen Handbal =

Dutch handball club

- Full name: Sportvereniging Dalfsen Handbal
- Founded: 2009
- Arena: De Trefkoele
- Capacity: 2,000
- President: Morrenhof Jansen
- League: hoofdklasse
- 2022–23: 2nd

Sportvereniging Dalfsen Handbal, normally called SV Dalfsen, is a handball club from Dalfsen, Netherlands. From the season 2007–08 up till the season 2017–18 they competed in the eredivisie. In this period they became national champions 6 times. Just before the start of season 2018–19 they withdrew from the eredivisie They currently compete in the hoofdklasse.

== Honours ==
- Eredivisie
  - Winners (6) : 2011, 2012, 2013, 2014, 2015, 2016
- Dutch Cup
  - Winners (5) : 2012, 2013, 2014, 2015, 2017
- Dutch Supercup
  - Winners (6) : 2011, 2012, 2013, 2014, 2015, 2017

== Former players ==
- (Netherlands) Angela Malestein
- (Netherlands) Kelly Dulfer
- (Netherlands) Fabienne Logtenberg
- (Netherlands) Sharina van Dort
- (Netherlands) Esther Schop
- (Netherlands) Lynn Knippenborg
- (Netherlands) Martine Smeets
- (Netherlands) Larissa Nüsser
- (Netherlands) Annick Lipman
- (Netherlands) Nyala Krullaars
- (Netherlands) Yara ten Holte
