= 2013 World Women's Handball Championship – European qualification =

The European qualification for the 2013 World Women's Handball Championship, in Serbia, was played over two rounds. The 2013 hosts Serbia, the 2011 holders Norway were qualified automatically for the World Championship. In the first round of qualification, 16 teams who were not participating at the 2012 European Women's Handball Championship were split into four groups. The group winners and the remaining 12 teams from the European Championship played a playoff afterwards to determine the other nine qualifiers.

== Group stage ==
The draw was held on 24 July 2012 at 11:00 at Vienna, Austria.

=== Seedings ===
The seedings were announced on 3 July 2012. After Great Britain withdrew, an update was made.

Pot 1	Pot 2	Pot 3
Austria; Belarus; Netherlands; Poland; Portugal; Slovakia; Turkey	Azerbaijan; Greece; Italy; Lithuania; Slovenia; Switzerland	Finland; Israel

=== Group A ===
Pos	Team	Pld	W	D	L	GF	GA	GD	Pts	Qualification
1	Slovakia (H)	3	3	0	0	94	58	+36	6	Playoffs
2	Switzerland	3	2	0	1	96	76	+20	4	
3	Greece	3	1	0	2	63	88	−25	2	
4	Finland	3	0	0	3	68	99	−31	0	

(H) Hosts

30 November 2012; 15:30	Switzerland	37–27	Finland	City sport hall, Partizánske; Attendance: 350; Referees: Gutowska, Gutowska (POL)
30 November 2012; 15:30	Wenger 6	(17–15)	von Numers 6	City sport hall, Partizánske; Attendance: 350; Referees: Gutowska, Gutowska (POL)
30 November 2012; 15:30	3× (yellow card) 3× (suspension)	Report	3× (yellow card) 1× (suspension)	City sport hall, Partizánske; Attendance: 350; Referees: Gutowska, Gutowska (POL)

30 November 2012; 18:00	Slovakia	30–16	Greece	City sport hall, Partizánske; Attendance: 1,000; Referees: Pech, Vágvölgyi (HUN)
30 November 2012; 18:00	Tothova 7	(15–8)	Chatziparasidou, Strataki 4	City sport hall, Partizánske; Attendance: 1,000; Referees: Pech, Vágvölgyi (HUN)
30 November 2012; 18:00	2× (yellow card) 5× (suspension)	Report	3× (yellow card) 6× (suspension) 1× (red card)	City sport hall, Partizánske; Attendance: 1,000; Referees: Pech, Vágvölgyi (HUN)

1 December 2012; 15:30	Greece	23–35	Switzerland	City sport hall, Partizánske; Attendance: 350; Referees: Pech, Vágvölgyi (HUN)
1 December 2012; 15:30	Poimenidou 7	(12–11)	Mustafoska 9	City sport hall, Partizánske; Attendance: 350; Referees: Pech, Vágvölgyi (HUN)
1 December 2012; 15:30	3× (yellow card) 4× (suspension)	Report	3× (yellow card) 4× (suspension)	City sport hall, Partizánske; Attendance: 350; Referees: Pech, Vágvölgyi (HUN)

1 December 2012; 18:00	Finland	18–38	Slovakia	City sport hall, Partizánske; Attendance: 1,000; Referees: Gutowska, Gutowska (POL)
1 December 2012; 18:00	Tallqvist, von Numers 5	(8–20)	Sukennikova 8	City sport hall, Partizánske; Attendance: 1,000; Referees: Gutowska, Gutowska (POL)
1 December 2012; 18:00	3× (yellow card) 1× (suspension)	Report	2× (yellow card) 7× (suspension) 1× (red card)	City sport hall, Partizánske; Attendance: 1,000; Referees: Gutowska, Gutowska (POL)

2 December 2012; 15:30	Greece	24–23	Finland	City sport hall, Partizánske; Attendance: 350; Referees: Gutowska, Gutowska (POL)
2 December 2012; 15:30	Vafeiadou 5	(18–11)	Lillqvist 6	City sport hall, Partizánske; Attendance: 350; Referees: Gutowska, Gutowska (POL)
2 December 2012; 15:30	3× (yellow card) 5× (suspension)	Report	2× (yellow card) 2× (suspension)	City sport hall, Partizánske; Attendance: 350; Referees: Gutowska, Gutowska (POL)

2 December 2012; 18:00	Slovakia	26–24	Switzerland	City sport hall, Partizánske; Attendance: 1,238; Referees: Pech, Vágvölgyi (HUN)
2 December 2012; 18:00	Jakubisova 6	(14–10)	Dinkel 8	City sport hall, Partizánske; Attendance: 1,238; Referees: Pech, Vágvölgyi (HUN)
2 December 2012; 18:00	3× (yellow card) 3× (suspension)	Report	3× (yellow card) 5× (suspension)	City sport hall, Partizánske; Attendance: 1,238; Referees: Pech, Vágvölgyi (HUN)

=== Group B ===
Pos	Team	Pld	W	D	L	GF	GA	GD	Pts	Qualification
1	Netherlands (H)	3	3	0	0	101	61	+40	6	Playoffs
2	Slovenia	3	2	0	1	87	65	+22	4	
3	Austria	3	1	0	2	80	78	+2	2	
4	Israel	3	0	0	3	61	125	−64	0	

(H) Hosts

29 November 2012; 17:30	Austria	22–26	Slovenia	Omnisport Apeldoorn, Apeldoorn; Attendance: 200; Referees: Delle, Engberg (SWE)
29 November 2012; 17:30	Frey 8	(13–12)	Lazovic-Varlec 5	Omnisport Apeldoorn, Apeldoorn; Attendance: 200; Referees: Delle, Engberg (SWE)
29 November 2012; 17:30	3× (yellow card) 2× (suspension)	Report	2× (yellow card) 4× (suspension)	Omnisport Apeldoorn, Apeldoorn; Attendance: 200; Referees: Delle, Engberg (SWE)

29 November 2012; 20:00	Netherlands	47–20	Israel	Omnisport Apeldoorn, Apeldoorn; Attendance: 500; Referees: Rakytina, Tkachuk (UKR)
29 November 2012; 20:00	Polman 8	(22–10)	Dunay 7	Omnisport Apeldoorn, Apeldoorn; Attendance: 500; Referees: Rakytina, Tkachuk (UKR)
29 November 2012; 20:00	3× (yellow card) 4× (suspension)	Report	3× (yellow card) 4× (suspension) 1× (red card)	Omnisport Apeldoorn, Apeldoorn; Attendance: 500; Referees: Rakytina, Tkachuk (UKR)

30 November 2012; 17:30	Israel	22–40	Austria	Omnisport Apeldoorn, Apeldoorn; Attendance: 600; Referees: Delle, Engberg (SWE)
30 November 2012; 17:30	Bertaut 9	(13–19)	Engel, Frey 9	Omnisport Apeldoorn, Apeldoorn; Attendance: 600; Referees: Delle, Engberg (SWE)
30 November 2012; 17:30	2× (yellow card) 5× (suspension)	Report	2× (yellow card) 2× (suspension)	Omnisport Apeldoorn, Apeldoorn; Attendance: 600; Referees: Delle, Engberg (SWE)

30 November 2012; 20:00	Slovenia	23–24	Netherlands	Omnisport Apeldoorn, Apeldoorn; Attendance: 1,800; Referees: Rakytina, Tkachuk (UKR)
30 November 2012; 20:00	Mavsar 6	(10–12)	Groot 6	Omnisport Apeldoorn, Apeldoorn; Attendance: 1,800; Referees: Rakytina, Tkachuk (UKR)
30 November 2012; 20:00	3× (yellow card) 5× (suspension)	Report	3× (yellow card) 6× (suspension)	Omnisport Apeldoorn, Apeldoorn; Attendance: 1,800; Referees: Rakytina, Tkachuk (UKR)

2 December 2012; 11:00	Slovenia	38–19	Israel	Omnisport Apeldoorn, Apeldoorn; Attendance: 400; Referees: Delle, Engberg (SWE)
2 December 2012; 11:00	Mavsar 9	(15–12)	three players 6	Omnisport Apeldoorn, Apeldoorn; Attendance: 400; Referees: Delle, Engberg (SWE)
2 December 2012; 11:00	3× (yellow card) 3× (suspension)	Report	2× (yellow card) 1× (suspension)	Omnisport Apeldoorn, Apeldoorn; Attendance: 400; Referees: Delle, Engberg (SWE)

2 December 2012; 13:30	Austria	18–30	Netherlands	Omnisport Apeldoorn, Apeldoorn; Attendance: 1,600; Referees: Rakytina, Tkachuk (UKR)
2 December 2012; 13:30	Engel 6	(9–16)	Groot, van der Heijden 6	Omnisport Apeldoorn, Apeldoorn; Attendance: 1,600; Referees: Rakytina, Tkachuk (UKR)
2 December 2012; 13:30	3× (yellow card) 2× (suspension)	Report	3× (yellow card) 6× (suspension)	Omnisport Apeldoorn, Apeldoorn; Attendance: 1,600; Referees: Rakytina, Tkachuk (UKR)

=== Group C ===
Pos	Team	Pld	W	D	L	GF	GA	GD	Pts	Qualification
1	Poland	6	6	0	0	210	101	+109	12	Playoffs
2	Belarus	6	4	0	2	189	139	+50	8	
3	Italy	6	2	0	4	116	187	−71	4	
4	Lithuania	6	0	0	6	142	230	−88	0	

3 October 2012; 19:00	Belarus	42–22	Lithuania	Sport Complex Olympiets, Mogilev; Attendance: 2,000; Referees: Rakytina, Tkachuk (UKR)
3 October 2012; 19:00	Yezhykova 9	(22–13)	Stellbrink 7	Sport Complex Olympiets, Mogilev; Attendance: 2,000; Referees: Rakytina, Tkachuk (UKR)
3 October 2012; 19:00	3× (yellow card) 5× (suspension)	Report	3× (yellow card) 2× (suspension)	Sport Complex Olympiets, Mogilev; Attendance: 2,000; Referees: Rakytina, Tkachuk (UKR)

4 October 2012; 20:00	Italy	11–32	Poland	Palazzetto dello sport Oderzo, Oderzo; Attendance: 700; Referees: Brkic, Jusufhodzic (AUT)
4 October 2012; 20:00	Ganga 3	(6–15)	Wojtas 9	Palazzetto dello sport Oderzo, Oderzo; Attendance: 700; Referees: Brkic, Jusufhodzic (AUT)
4 October 2012; 20:00	3× (yellow card) 4× (suspension)	Report	3× (yellow card) 3× (suspension)	Palazzetto dello sport Oderzo, Oderzo; Attendance: 700; Referees: Brkic, Jusufhodzic (AUT)

7 October 2012; 16:00	Lithuania	27–29	Italy	Cido Arena, Panevėžys; Attendance: 400; Referees: Florescu, Duţă (ROU)
7 October 2012; 16:00	three players 5	(11–16)	Costa 7	Cido Arena, Panevėžys; Attendance: 400; Referees: Florescu, Duţă (ROU)
7 October 2012; 16:00	3× (yellow card) 3× (suspension)	Report	3× (yellow card) 7× (suspension) 1× (red card)	Cido Arena, Panevėžys; Attendance: 400; Referees: Florescu, Duţă (ROU)

7 October 2012; 17:10	Poland	29–19	Belarus	Hala MOSiR, Legionowo; Attendance: 1,000; Referees: Pech, Vágvölgyi (HUN)
7 October 2012; 17:10	Kudłacz 8	(17–13)	Yezhykova 6	Hala MOSiR, Legionowo; Attendance: 1,000; Referees: Pech, Vágvölgyi (HUN)
7 October 2012; 17:10	3× (yellow card) 2× (suspension)	Report	2× (yellow card) 3× (suspension)	Hala MOSiR, Legionowo; Attendance: 1,000; Referees: Pech, Vágvölgyi (HUN)

21 November 2012; 20:30	Poland	48–18	Lithuania	Miejska Hala Sportowa, Elbląg; Attendance: 2,100; Referees: Antić, Jakovljević (SRB)
21 November 2012; 20:30	Koniuszaniec, Kulwińska 7	(21–11)	Palionyte, Satkauskaite 5	Miejska Hala Sportowa, Elbląg; Attendance: 2,100; Referees: Antić, Jakovljević (SRB)
21 November 2012; 20:30	3× (yellow card) 3× (suspension)	Report	3× (yellow card) 3× (suspension)	Miejska Hala Sportowa, Elbląg; Attendance: 2,100; Referees: Antić, Jakovljević (SRB)

22 November 2012; 20:00	Italy	16–30	Belarus	Palasport, Rovereto; Attendance: 500; Referees: Ilieva, Karbeska (MKD)
22 November 2012; 20:00	Ganga 5	(9–11)	Stsiapanava, Yezhykova 6	Palasport, Rovereto; Attendance: 500; Referees: Ilieva, Karbeska (MKD)
22 November 2012; 20:00	3× (yellow card)	Report	3× (yellow card) 1× (suspension)	Palasport, Rovereto; Attendance: 500; Referees: Ilieva, Karbeska (MKD)

24 November 2012; 16:00	Lithuania	19–32	Poland	Cido Arena, Panevėžys; Attendance: 150; Referees: Năstase, Stancu (ROU)
24 November 2012; 16:00	Butenaite, Satkauskaite 4	(10–17)	Koniuszaniec 7	Cido Arena, Panevėžys; Attendance: 150; Referees: Năstase, Stancu (ROU)
24 November 2012; 16:00	2× (yellow card) 4× (suspension)	Report	3× (yellow card) 3× (suspension)	Cido Arena, Panevėžys; Attendance: 150; Referees: Năstase, Stancu (ROU)

25 November 2012; 14:00	Belarus	29–16	Italy	Sport Complex Olympiets, Mogilev; Attendance: 2,000; Referees: Crnojević, Radič (CRO)
25 November 2012; 14:00	Yezhykova 7	(14–7)	Fanton 6	Sport Complex Olympiets, Mogilev; Attendance: 2,000; Referees: Crnojević, Radič (CRO)
25 November 2012; 14:00	3× (yellow card) 6× (suspension)	Report	3× (yellow card) 3× (suspension)	Sport Complex Olympiets, Mogilev; Attendance: 2,000; Referees: Crnojević, Radič (CRO)

28 November 2012; 18:00	Poland	39–12	Italy	Sport Complex Kwidzyn, Kwidzyn; Attendance: 1,500; Referees: Skruzny, Kavulic (CZE)
28 November 2012; 18:00	Kulwinska 8	(18–7)	Rotondo 4	Sport Complex Kwidzyn, Kwidzyn; Attendance: 1,500; Referees: Skruzny, Kavulic (CZE)
28 November 2012; 18:00	3× (yellow card) 2× (suspension)	Report	3× (yellow card) 5× (suspension)	Sport Complex Kwidzyn, Kwidzyn; Attendance: 1,500; Referees: Skruzny, Kavulic (CZE)

28 November 2012; 20:00	Lithuania	26–47	Belarus	Kaunas Sports Hall, Kaunas; Attendance: 300; Referees: Alpaidze, Berezkina (RUS)
28 November 2012; 20:00	Satkauskaite 6	(12–22)	Kurchankova, Sukhamirava 6	Kaunas Sports Hall, Kaunas; Attendance: 300; Referees: Alpaidze, Berezkina (RUS)
28 November 2012; 20:00	3× (yellow card) 6× (suspension)	Report	2× (yellow card) 10× (suspension)	Kaunas Sports Hall, Kaunas; Attendance: 300; Referees: Alpaidze, Berezkina (RUS)

1 December 2012; 20:30	Italy	32–30	Lithuania	Palasport, Rovereto; Attendance: 200; Referees: Vitaku, Vitaku (Kosovo)
1 December 2012; 20:30	Fanton 7	(16–17)	Butenaite 10	Palasport, Rovereto; Attendance: 200; Referees: Vitaku, Vitaku (Kosovo)
1 December 2012; 20:30	3× (yellow card) 5× (suspension)	Report	4× (yellow card) 3× (suspension)	Palasport, Rovereto; Attendance: 200; Referees: Vitaku, Vitaku (Kosovo)

2 December 2012; 15:00	Belarus	22–30	Poland	Sport Complex Olympiets, Mogilev; Attendance: 1,900; Referees: Vranes, Wenninger (AUT)
2 December 2012; 15:00	Drazdova, Yezhykova 5	(11–13)	four players 4	Sport Complex Olympiets, Mogilev; Attendance: 1,900; Referees: Vranes, Wenninger (AUT)
2 December 2012; 15:00	2× (yellow card) 2× (suspension)	Report	3× (yellow card) 5× (suspension)	Sport Complex Olympiets, Mogilev; Attendance: 1,900; Referees: Vranes, Wenninger (AUT)

=== Group D ===
Pos	Team	Pld	W	D	L	GF	GA	GD	Pts	Qualification
1	Turkey	4	3	0	1	136	109	+27	6	Playoffs
2	Portugal	4	2	0	2	118	124	−6	4	
3	Azerbaijan	4	1	0	3	98	119	−21	2	

3 October 2012; 18:00	Turkey	35–19	Azerbaijan	THF Sport Hall, Çankaya; Attendance: 1,500; Referees: Ilieva, Karbeska (MKD)
3 October 2012; 18:00	Sagdic, Yörükler 5	(16–7)	Lukyanenko 6	THF Sport Hall, Çankaya; Attendance: 1,500; Referees: Ilieva, Karbeska (MKD)
3 October 2012; 18:00	3× (yellow card) 5× (suspension)	Report	2× (yellow card) 1× (suspension)	THF Sport Hall, Çankaya; Attendance: 1,500; Referees: Ilieva, Karbeska (MKD)

6 October 2012; 17:00	Portugal	38–36	Turkey	Pavilhao de Desportos de Anadia, Anadia; Attendance: 1,400; Referees: Gasmi, Gasmi (FRA)
6 October 2012; 17:00	Andrade Lopes 9	(20–17)	four players 5	Pavilhao de Desportos de Anadia, Anadia; Attendance: 1,400; Referees: Gasmi, Gasmi (FRA)
6 October 2012; 17:00	3× (yellow card) 3× (suspension)	Report	3× (yellow card) 4× (suspension)	Pavilhao de Desportos de Anadia, Anadia; Attendance: 1,400; Referees: Gasmi, Gasmi (FRA)

21 November 2012; 17:00	Azerbaijan	27–23	Portugal	ABU Arena, Baku; Attendance: 400; Referees: Vujačić, Kazanegra (MNE)
21 November 2012; 17:00	Tankaskaya 9	(17–13)	Andrade Lopes 8	ABU Arena, Baku; Attendance: 400; Referees: Vujačić, Kazanegra (MNE)
21 November 2012; 17:00	3× (yellow card) 4× (suspension)	Report	3× (yellow card) 2× (suspension)	ABU Arena, Baku; Attendance: 400; Referees: Vujačić, Kazanegra (MNE)

24 November 2012; 17:00	Azerbaijan	26–30	Turkey	ABU Arena, Baku; Attendance: 500; Referees: Markovska, Vutov (BUL)
24 November 2012; 17:00	Peche 5	(12–13)	Özel 8	ABU Arena, Baku; Attendance: 500; Referees: Markovska, Vutov (BUL)
24 November 2012; 17:00	3× (yellow card) 2× (suspension)	Report	3× (yellow card) 5× (suspension)	ABU Arena, Baku; Attendance: 500; Referees: Markovska, Vutov (BUL)

28 November 2012; 20:00	Portugal	31–26	Azerbaijan	Pavilhao Municipal da Torre da Marinha, Seixal; Attendance: 1,500; Referees: Cabrejas, Sánchez (ESP)
28 November 2012; 20:00	Seabra 7	(15–11)	Peche 9	Pavilhao Municipal da Torre da Marinha, Seixal; Attendance: 1,500; Referees: Cabrejas, Sánchez (ESP)
28 November 2012; 20:00	3× (yellow card) 6× (suspension)	Report	2× (yellow card) 2× (suspension)	Pavilhao Municipal da Torre da Marinha, Seixal; Attendance: 1,500; Referees: Cabrejas, Sánchez (ESP)

1 December 2012; 11:00	Turkey	35–26	Portugal	THF Sport Hall, Çankaya; Attendance: 1,200; Referees: Kijauskaite, Zaliene (LTU)
1 December 2012; 11:00	Özel 8	(21–12)	Ferreira Lopes, Seabra 4	THF Sport Hall, Çankaya; Attendance: 1,200; Referees: Kijauskaite, Zaliene (LTU)
1 December 2012; 11:00	3× (yellow card) 4× (suspension)	Report	2× (yellow card) 1× (suspension)	THF Sport Hall, Çankaya; Attendance: 1,200; Referees: Kijauskaite, Zaliene (LTU)

== Playoff round ==
=== Seedings ===
The seedings were announced on 14 December 2012. The draw took place on 16 December 2012 at 13:00 local time at Belgrade, Serbia.

Pot 1 (8 best ranked teams from the 2012 European Championship)	Pot 2 (4 lowest ranked teams from the 2012 European Championship + teams from the qualification round)
Czech Republic; Denmark; Spain; France; Germany; Romania; Russia; Sweden	Croatia; Iceland; Macedonia; Ukraine; Netherlands; Poland; Slovakia; Turkey

=== Matches ===
Team 1	Agg.	Team 2	1st leg	2nd leg
Turkey	50–73	Denmark	24–42	26–31
Iceland	38–55	Czech Republic	17–29	21–26
Macedonia	37–54	Spain	21–27	16–27
Netherlands	59–48	Russia	26–27	33–21
Slovakia	43–53	Romania	21–23	22–30
Germany	49–38	Ukraine	24–16	25–22
Sweden	54–58	Poland	23–26	31–32
France	48–44	Croatia	18–18	30–26

==== First leg ====
1 June 2013; 16:00	Slovakia	21–23	Romania	City sport hall, Partizánske; Attendance: 1,200; Referees: Olesen, Pedersen (DEN)
1 June 2013; 16:00	Tóthová 9	(11–12)	Ţăcălie 7	City sport hall, Partizánske; Attendance: 1,200; Referees: Olesen, Pedersen (DEN)
1 June 2013; 16:00	3× (yellow card) 3× (suspension)	Report	3× (yellow card) 4× (suspension)	City sport hall, Partizánske; Attendance: 1,200; Referees: Olesen, Pedersen (DEN)

1 June 2013; 19:30	France	18–18	Croatia	L'Axone, Montbéliard; Attendance: 4,800; Referees: Stoļarovs, Līcis (LAT)
1 June 2013; 19:30	Pineau, Baudouin 4	(5–10)	Elez 5	L'Axone, Montbéliard; Attendance: 4,800; Referees: Stoļarovs, Līcis (LAT)
1 June 2013; 19:30	3× (yellow card) 1× (suspension)	Report	3× (yellow card) 2× (suspension)	L'Axone, Montbéliard; Attendance: 4,800; Referees: Stoļarovs, Līcis (LAT)

1 June 2013; 20:15	Macedonia	21–27	Spain	SRC Kale, Skopje; Attendance: 1,300; Referees: Herczeg, Südi (HUN)
1 June 2013; 20:15	Gjeorgjievska 6	(11–14)	Barbosa 7	SRC Kale, Skopje; Attendance: 1,300; Referees: Herczeg, Südi (HUN)
1 June 2013; 20:15	2× (yellow card) 3× (suspension)	Report	3× (yellow card) 1× (suspension)	SRC Kale, Skopje; Attendance: 1,300; Referees: Herczeg, Südi (HUN)

2 June 2013; 14:00	Netherlands	26–27	Russia	Topsportcentrum Rotterdam, Rotterdam; Attendance: 2,000; Referees: Leandersson, Lindroos (FIN)
2 June 2013; 14:00	Abbingh 11	(16–10)	Stepanova 5	Topsportcentrum Rotterdam, Rotterdam; Attendance: 2,000; Referees: Leandersson, Lindroos (FIN)
2 June 2013; 14:00	3× (yellow card) 3× (suspension)	Report	3× (yellow card) 4× (suspension)	Topsportcentrum Rotterdam, Rotterdam; Attendance: 2,000; Referees: Leandersson, Lindroos (FIN)

2 June 2013; 15:00	Germany	24–16	Ukraine	EWE Arena, Oldenburg; Attendance: 2,600; Referees: Marić, Mašić (SRB)
2 June 2013; 15:00	Nadgornaja 6	(13–7)	Managarova 6	EWE Arena, Oldenburg; Attendance: 2,600; Referees: Marić, Mašić (SRB)
2 June 2013; 15:00	3× (yellow card) 2× (suspension)	Report	3× (yellow card) 2× (suspension)	EWE Arena, Oldenburg; Attendance: 2,600; Referees: Marić, Mašić (SRB)

2 June 2013; 16:00	Iceland	17–29	Czech Republic	Vodafonehöllin, Hlíðarendi; Attendance: 523; Referees: Lorente, Serradilla (ESP)
2 June 2013; 16:00	Bragadóttir 8	(6–15)	Hrbková 8	Vodafonehöllin, Hlíðarendi; Attendance: 523; Referees: Lorente, Serradilla (ESP)
2 June 2013; 16:00	3× (yellow card) 2× (suspension)	Report	3× (yellow card) 5× (suspension)	Vodafonehöllin, Hlíðarendi; Attendance: 523; Referees: Lorente, Serradilla (ESP)

2 June 2013; 18:15	Sweden	23–26	Poland	Idrottshuset, Örebro; Attendance: 1,782; Referees: Bonaventura, Bonaventura (FRA)
2 June 2013; 18:15	Ahlm, Gulldén 6	(13–16)	Kudłacz 8	Idrottshuset, Örebro; Attendance: 1,782; Referees: Bonaventura, Bonaventura (FRA)
2 June 2013; 18:15	3× (yellow card) 2× (suspension)	Report	3× (yellow card) 2× (suspension)	Idrottshuset, Örebro; Attendance: 1,782; Referees: Bonaventura, Bonaventura (FRA)

2 June 2013; 19:00	Turkey	24–42	Denmark	THF Sport Hall, Çankaya; Attendance: 1,500; Referees: Cvetko, Kavalar (SLO)
2 June 2013; 19:00	İskenderoğlu 9	(13–18)	Grigel 7	THF Sport Hall, Çankaya; Attendance: 1,500; Referees: Cvetko, Kavalar (SLO)
2 June 2013; 19:00	3× (yellow card) 1× (suspension)	Report	3× (yellow card)	THF Sport Hall, Çankaya; Attendance: 1,500; Referees: Cvetko, Kavalar (SLO)

==== Second leg ====
7 June 2013; 19:00	Spain	27–16	Macedonia	Polideportivo Municipal Los Pajaritos, Soria; Attendance: 1,200; Referees: Stenrand, Birch (DEN)
7 June 2013; 19:00	López 5	(16–8)	Crvenkoska 7	Polideportivo Municipal Los Pajaritos, Soria; Attendance: 1,200; Referees: Stenrand, Birch (DEN)
7 June 2013; 19:00	3× (yellow card) 4× (suspension)	Report	3× (yellow card) 4× (suspension)	Polideportivo Municipal Los Pajaritos, Soria; Attendance: 1,200; Referees: Stenrand, Birch (DEN)

8 June 2013; 17:00	Poland	32–31	Sweden	Miejska Hala Sportowa, Elbląg; Attendance: 2,800; Referees: Santos, Fonseca (POR)
8 June 2013; 17:00	Wojtas 9	(17–15)	Gulldén 11	Miejska Hala Sportowa, Elbląg; Attendance: 2,800; Referees: Santos, Fonseca (POR)
8 June 2013; 17:00	3× (yellow card) 6× (suspension)	Report	3× (yellow card) 3× (suspension)	Miejska Hala Sportowa, Elbląg; Attendance: 2,800; Referees: Santos, Fonseca (POR)

8 June 2013; 18:00	Czech Republic	26–21	Iceland	Sportovni hala Banik Most, Most; Attendance: 1,000; Referees: Radič, Crnojević (CRO)
8 June 2013; 18:00	Luzumová 6	(15–9)	Bragadóttir 4	Sportovni hala Banik Most, Most; Attendance: 1,000; Referees: Radič, Crnojević (CRO)
8 June 2013; 18:00	2× (yellow card) 2× (suspension)	Report	3× (yellow card) 3× (suspension)	Sportovni hala Banik Most, Most; Attendance: 1,000; Referees: Radič, Crnojević (CRO)

8 June 2013; 18:00	Romania	30–22	Slovakia	Antonio Alexa, Oradea; Attendance: 2,500; Referees: Erdoğan, Özdeniz (TUR)
8 June 2013; 18:00	Ţăcălie 11	(18–14)	Tóthová 8	Antonio Alexa, Oradea; Attendance: 2,500; Referees: Erdoğan, Özdeniz (TUR)
8 June 2013; 18:00	3× (yellow card) 4× (suspension)	Report	3× (yellow card) 2× (suspension)	Antonio Alexa, Oradea; Attendance: 2,500; Referees: Erdoğan, Özdeniz (TUR)

8 June 2013; 20:15	Denmark	31–26	Turkey	Atletion, Aarhus; Attendance: 2,452; Referees: Mazeika, Gatelis (LTU)
8 June 2013; 20:15	Kristiansen, Thorsgaard 5	(13–15)	Yılmaz 8	Atletion, Aarhus; Attendance: 2,452; Referees: Mazeika, Gatelis (LTU)
8 June 2013; 20:15	3× (yellow card) 4× (suspension)	Report	3× (yellow card) 4× (suspension)	Atletion, Aarhus; Attendance: 2,452; Referees: Mazeika, Gatelis (LTU)

9 June 2013; 17:00	Russia	21–33	Netherlands	Palace of Sport "Sport-Don", Rostov-on-Don; Attendance: 2,150; Referees: Brehmer, Skowronek (POL)
9 June 2013; 17:00	Sen 6	(10–11)	Abbingh 7	Palace of Sport "Sport-Don", Rostov-on-Don; Attendance: 2,150; Referees: Brehmer, Skowronek (POL)
9 June 2013; 17:00	2× (yellow card) 5× (suspension)	Report	3× (yellow card) 6× (suspension)	Palace of Sport "Sport-Don", Rostov-on-Don; Attendance: 2,150; Referees: Brehmer, Skowronek (POL)

9 June 2013; 18:30	Croatia	26–30	France	Sporthall Umag, Umag; Attendance: 1,200; Referees: Florescu, Duţă (ROU)
9 June 2013; 18:30	three players 4	(12–13)	Lacrabère, Pineau 5	Sporthall Umag, Umag; Attendance: 1,200; Referees: Florescu, Duţă (ROU)
9 June 2013; 18:30	3× (yellow card) 1× (suspension)	Report	3× (yellow card) 4× (suspension) 1× (red card)	Sporthall Umag, Umag; Attendance: 1,200; Referees: Florescu, Duţă (ROU)

9 June 2013; 19:00	Ukraine	22–25	Germany	Palace of Sports, Kyiv; Attendance: 1,000; Referees: Brkic, Jusufhodzic (AUT)
9 June 2013; 19:00	Borshchenko 8	(10–11)	Geschke 4	Palace of Sports, Kyiv; Attendance: 1,000; Referees: Brkic, Jusufhodzic (AUT)
9 June 2013; 19:00	3× (yellow card) 4× (suspension)	Report	3× (yellow card) 4× (suspension)	Palace of Sports, Kyiv; Attendance: 1,000; Referees: Brkic, Jusufhodzic (AUT)
