= Macarena Alonso =

Argentine handball player

Personal information
- Nationality: Argentinian
- Born: 13 January 1993 (age 33)
- Height: 1.65 m (5 ft 5 in)

Sport
- Sport: Handball
- Position: Left wing
- Current club: Sedalo
National team
Years	Team	Apps	(Gls)
–	Argentina	10	(20)

Macarena Alonso (born 13 January 1993) is an Argentinian team handball player. She plays for the club Sedalo, and on the Argentine national team. She represented Argentina at the 2013 World Women's Handball Championship in Serbia.
