= Nadia Belakhdar =

Algerian handball player (born 1991)

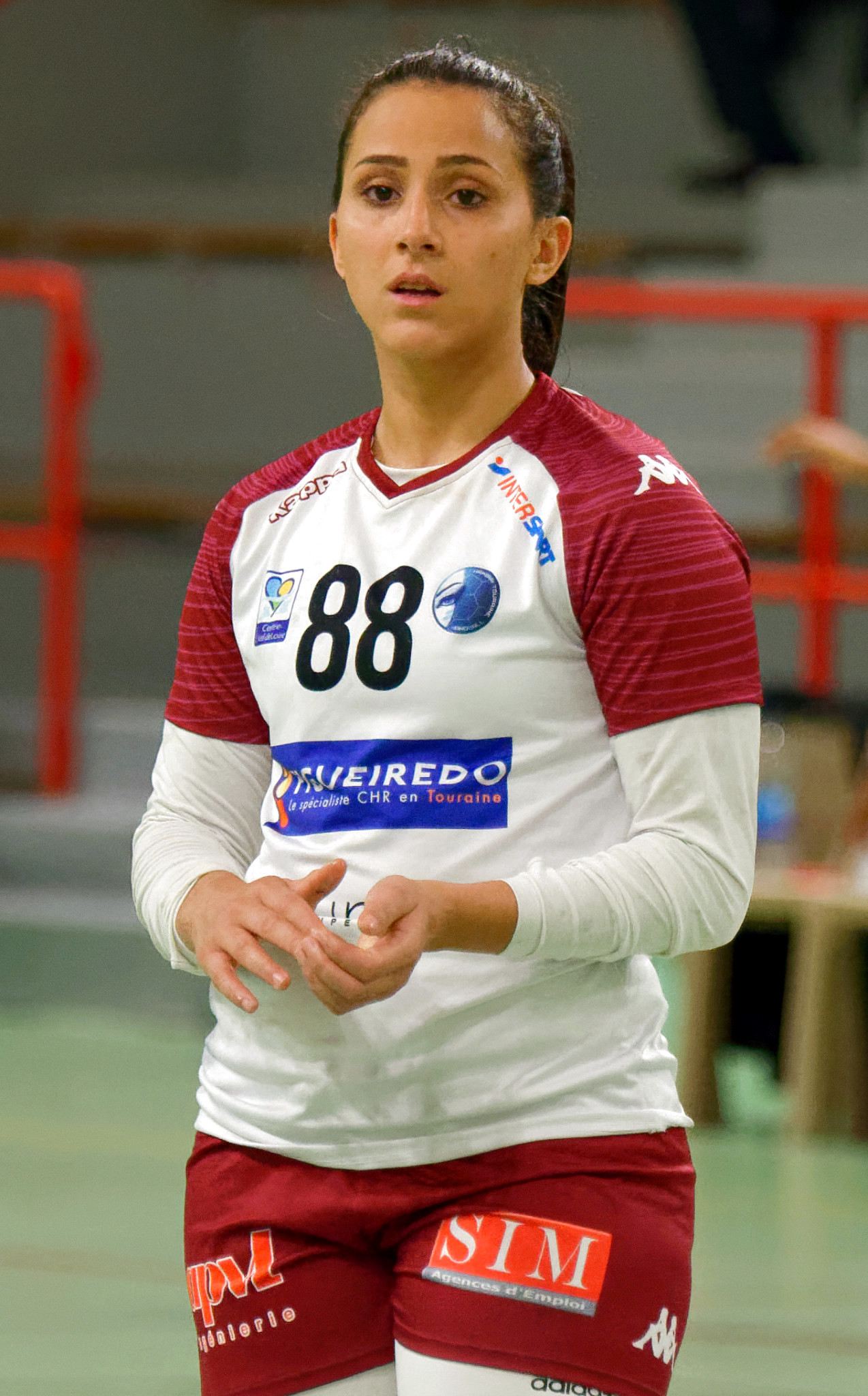

Personal information
- Nationality: Algerian
- Born: 16 April 1991 (age 35) Suresnes, France
- Height: 1.69 m (5 ft 7 in)

Sport
- Sport: Handball
- Position: Central back
- Current club: Chambray Touraine Handball
National team
Years	Team	Apps	(Gls)
–	Algeria	0	(0)

Nadia Belakhdar (born 16 April 1991) is an Algerian team handball player. She plays for the club Noisy Le Grand, and on the Algerian national team. She competed at the 2013 World Women's Handball Championship in Serbia, where Algeria placed 22nd.
