= Martina Crhová =

Czech handball player

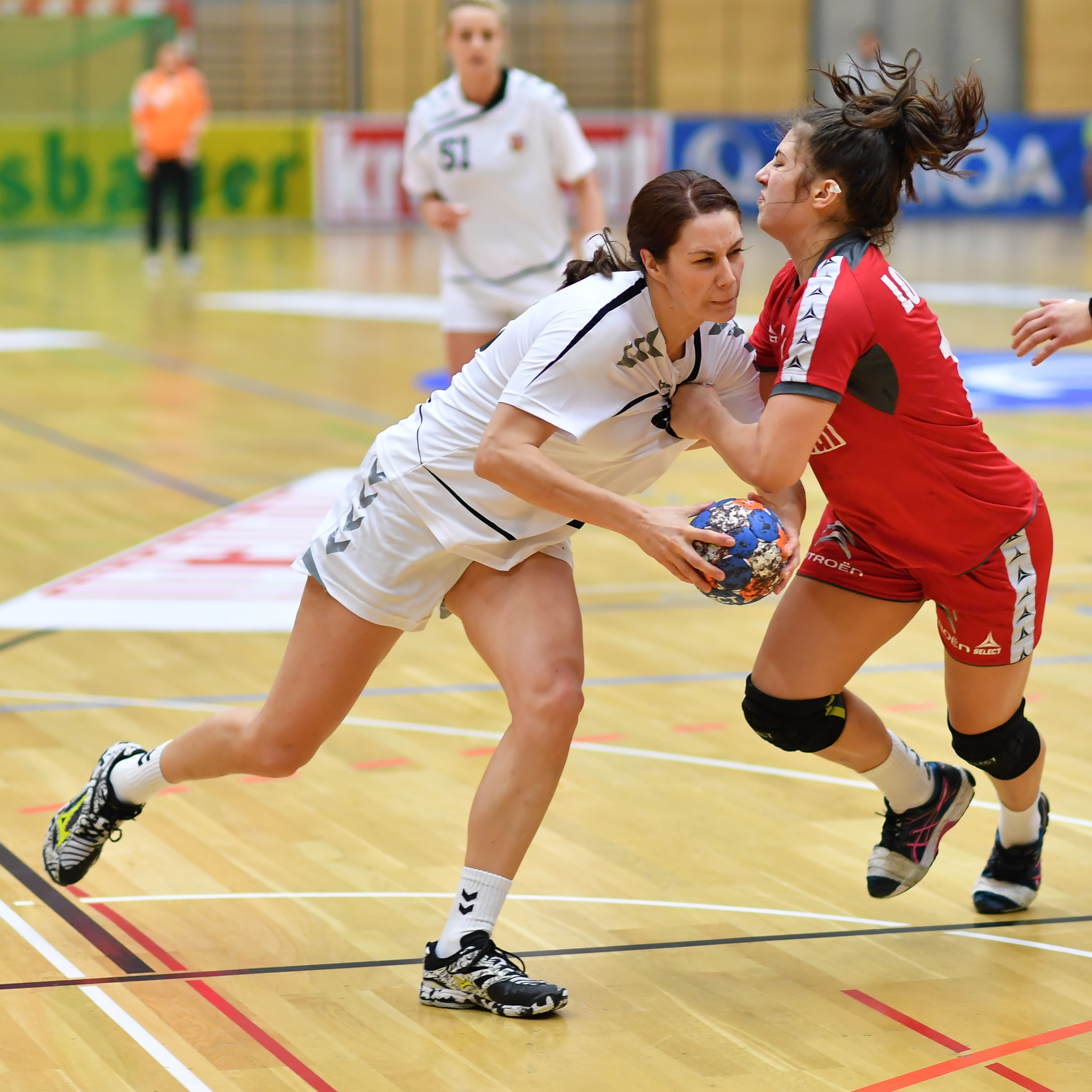

Personal information
- Nationality: Czech
- Born: 17 June 1988 (age 38) Prague, Czechoslovakia
- Height: 1.76 m (5 ft 9 in)

Sport
- Sport: Handball
- Position: Right back
- Current club: Kristianstad Handboll
- Number: 33
National team
Years	Team	Apps	(Gls)
–	Czech Republic	63	(78)

Martina Crhová (born 17 June 1988) is a Czech handball player for Kristianstad Handboll and the Czech national team.

She represented the Czech Republic at the 2013 World Women's Handball Championship in Serbia.
