= Fatiha Iberaken =

Algerian handball player (born 1986)

Personal information
- Nationality: Algerian
- Born: 3 April 1986 (age 40)
- Height: 1.68 m (5 ft 6 in)

Sport
- Sport: Handball
- Position: Central back
- Current club: HBC El Biar
National team
Years	Team	Apps	(Gls)
–	Algeria	15	(12)

Fatiha Iberaken (born 3 April 1986) is an Algerian team handball player. She plays for the club Saida, and on the Algerian national team. She competed at the 2013 World Women's Handball Championship in Serbia, where Algeria placed 22nd.
