= Rekia Ziadi =

Algerian handball player (born 1986)

Personal information
- Nationality: Algerian
- Born: 8 February 1986 (age 40)
- Height: 1.88 m (6 ft 2 in)

Sport
- Sport: Handball
- Position: Left back
- Current club: HHB Saida
National team
Years	Team	Apps	(Gls)
–	Algeria	49	(22)

Rekia Ziadi (born 8 February 1986) is an Algerian team handball player. She plays for the club Saida, and on the Algerian national team. She competed at the 2013 World Women's Handball Championship in Serbia, where Algeria placed 22nd.
