= Wang Shuhui =

Chinese handball player (born 1993)

Personal information
- Nationality: Chinese
- Born: 12 July 1993 (age 33)
- Height: 1.78 m (5 ft 10 in)

Sport
- Sport: Handball
- Position: Left back
- Current club: Jiangsu Club
National team
Years	Team	Apps	(Gls)
–	China	11	(22)

Wang Shuhui (Chinese: 王书慧; pinyin: Wáng Shūhuì; born 12 July 1993) is a Chinese team handball player. She plays for the club Jiangsu, and on the Chinese national team. She represented China at the 2013 World Women's Handball Championship in Serbia.
