= THF Sport Hall =

Indoor arena in Ankara, Turkey

THF Sport Hall THF Spor Salonu
- Interactive map of THF Sport Hall; THF Spor Salonu
- Location: Hollanda Cad. 47, Çankaya, Ankara, Turkey
- Coordinates: 39°52′25″N 32°51′16″E
- Owner: Turkey Handball Federation
- Capacity: 2,700

Construction
- Groundbreaking: October 21, 2011; 14 years ago
- Opened: October 3, 2012; 13 years ago
- Cost: ₺11 million (approx. US$ 6.145 as of October 2012

The THF Sport Hall (Turkish: THF Spor Salonu) is an indoor arena of the Turkish Handball Federation (THF) for handball matches located in Ankara, Turkey. It is situated within the THF complex. The venue, having a seating capacity of 2,700, was opened in 2012.

== Construction ==
The Turkish Ministry of Youth and Sports and the Turkey Handball Federation (THF) decided the building of a handball-dedicated sports venue in Ankara on May 23, 2011. The construction began with ground breaking on October 21, 2011, and completed in June 2012. The venue opened officially on October 3, 2013. The construction cost of ₺11 million (approx. US$6.145 as of October 2012) was funded by the ministry. The venue is situated at Yıldızevler, Hilal neighborhood of Çankaya district in Ankara.

== Venues ==
The first event the venue hosted was a match for the 2013 World Women's Handball Championship qualification playoffs between the national teams of Turkey and Azerbaijan played on the opening day. The tournament's all the Group D matches were held also at the THF Sport Hall. Qualified for the playoff round, the Turkish team will play their first leg match against the Danish nationals at the venue. The Turkey men's national handball team plays their home matches in the 2014 European Men's Handball Championship Qualification - Phase 2 at the THF Sport Hall.

The venue hosts all the Handball Super League and Women's Handball Super League matches scheduled in Ankara.

== International competitions hosted ==
- 2013 World Women's Handball Championship – European qualification
- 2014 European Men's Handball Championship qualification
- 2014 European Women's Handball Championship qualification
- 2015 World Men's Handball Championship – European qualification
- 2016 European Men's Handball Championship qualification
- 2016 European Women's Handball Championship qualification
- 2023 EHF Championship W17 Handball
