= Karolina Siódmiak =

Polish handball player (born 1981)

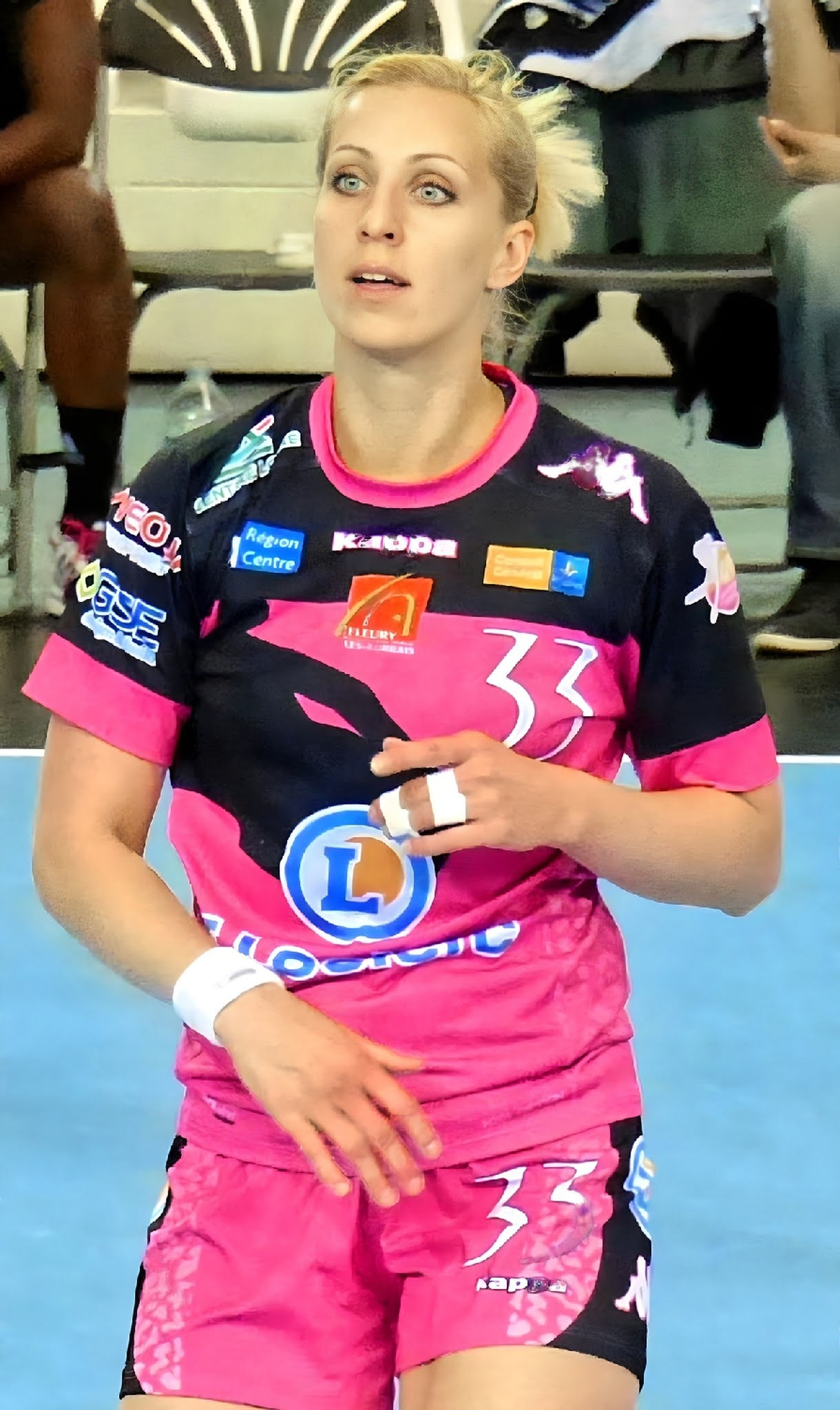

Personal information
- Nationality: Polish
- Born: 14 September 1981 (age 45) Ryn, Poland
- Height: 1.78 m (5 ft 10 in)

Sport
- Sport: Handball
- Position: Centre back
- Current club: AZS OŚ Gdańsk
National team
Years	Team	Apps	(Gls)
–	Poland	68	(171)

Karolina Siódmiak (born 14 September 1981) is a Polish handball player. She plays for the club AZS OŚ Gdańsk, the Polish national team and represented Poland at the 2013 World Women's Handball Championship in Serbia.
