= 2013 World Women's Handball Championship =

2013 edition of the World Women's Handball Championship

Tournament details
- Host country: Serbia
- Venues: 5 (in 4 host cities)
- Dates: 6–22 December
- Teams: 24 (from 5 confederations)

Final positions
- Champions: Brazil (1st title)
- Runners-up: Serbia
- Third place: Denmark
- Fourth place: Poland

Tournament statistics
- Matches played: 82
- Goals scored: 4,179 (50.96 per match)
- Attendance: 161,167 (1,965 per match)
- Top scorer: (Germany) Susann Müller (62 goals)

Awards
- Best player: (Brazil) Eduarda Amorim

The 2013 World Women's Handball Championship, the 21st event hosted by the International Handball Federation (IHF), was held in Serbia from 6 to 22 December 2013.

Brazil defeated Serbia 22–20 in the final and became the first IHF world champions from the Americas.

== Venues ==
Five venues in four cities had been selected to host the matches:

Group stage		Group stage/President's Cup
Belgrade	Zrenjanin	Niš
Pionir Hall; Capacity: 8,150	Crystal Hall; Capacity: 3,000	Čair Sports Center; Capacity: 5,000
Group stage/Knockout stage	Knockout stage	
Novi Sad	Belgrade	
Spens Sports Center; Capacity: 11,500	Kombank Arena; Capacity: 23,000	

=== Bidding process ===
South Korea was the other applicant for the championship. The decision to select Serbia as the host was announced on 2 October 2010.

== Qualified teams ==
Country	Qualified as	Qualification date	Previous appearances in tournament^{1}
Serbia	Host	2 October 2010	0 (Debut)
Norway	World Champions	18 December 2011	16 (1971, 1973, 1975, 1982, 1986, 1990, 1993, 1995, 1997, **1999**, 2001, 2003, 2005, 2007, 2009, **2011**)
Algeria	Semifinalist of African Championship	19 January 2012	2 (1978, 1997)
Angola	Semifinalist of African Championship	19 January 2012	11 (1990, 1993, 1995, 1997, 1999, 2001, 2003, 2005, 2007, 2009, 2011)
DR Congo	Semifinalist of African Championship	19 January 2012	0 (Debut)
Tunisia	Semifinalist of African Championship	19 January 2012	6 (1975, 2001, 2003, 2007, 2009, 2011)
Montenegro	Semifinalist of European Championship	9 December 2012	1 (2011)
Hungary	Semifinalist of European Championship	11 December 2012	18 (1957, 1962, **1965**, 1971, 1973, 1975, 1978, 1982, 1986, 1993, 1995, 1997, 1999, 2001, 2003, 2005, 2007, 2009)
South Korea	Finalist of 2012 Asian Championship	14 December 2012	14 (1978, 1982, 1986, 1990, 1993, **1995**, 1997, 1999, 2001, 2003, 2005, 2007, 2009, 2011)
China	Finalist of 2012 Asian Championship	14 December 2012	12 (1986, 1990, 1993, 1995, 1997, 1999, 2001, 2003, 2005, 2007, 2009, 2011)
Japan	Third place of 2012 Asian Championship	16 December 2012	15 (1962, 1965, 1971, 1973, 1975, 1986, 1995, 1997, 1999, 2001, 2003, 2005, 2007, 2009, 2011)
Australia	Winner of 2013 Oceania Championship	27 April 2013	6 (1999, 2003, 2005, 2007, 2009, 2011)
Argentina	Semifinalist of 2013 Pan American Championship	5 June 2013	6 (1999, 2003, 2005, 2007, 2009, 2011)
Brazil	Semifinalist of 2013 Pan American Championship	5 June 2013	9 (1995, 1997, 1999, 2001, 2003, 2005, 2007, 2009, 2011)
Dominican Republic	Semifinalist of 2013 Pan American Championship	5 June 2013	1 (2007)
Paraguay	Semifinalist of 2013 Pan American Championship	5 June 2013	1 (2007)
Spain	Winner of Playoff round	7 June 2013	6 (1993, 2001, 2003, 2007, 2009, 2011)
Romania	Winner of Playoff round	8 June 2013	20 (1957, **1962**,1965, 1971, 1973, 1975, 1978, 1982, 1986, 1990, 1993, 1995, 1997, 1999, 2001, 2003, 2005, 2007, 2009, 2011)
Poland	Winner of Playoff round	8 June 2013	13 (1957, 1962, 1965, 1973, 1975, 1978, 1986, 1990, 1993, 1997, 1999, 2005, 2007)
Czech Republic	Winner of Playoff round	8 June 2013	4 (1995, 1997, 1999, 2003)
Denmark	Winner of Playoff round	8 June 2013	16 (1957, 1962, 1965, 1971, 1973, 1975, 1990, 1993, 1995, **1997**, 1999, 2001, 2003, 2005, 2009, 2011)
Netherlands	Winner of Playoff round	9 June 2013	8 (1971, 1973, 1978, 1986, 1999, 2001, 2005, 2011)
Germany	Winner of Playoff round	9 June 2013	10 (**1993**, 1995, 1997, 1999, 2003, 2005, 2007, 2009, 2011)
France	Winner of Playoff round	9 June 2013	10 (1986, 1990, 1997, 1999, 2001, **2003**, 2005, 2007, 2009, 2011)

^{1} Bold indicates champion for that year, Italics indicates host for that year.

== Group draw ==
The draw was held on 15 June 2013 at 11:30 local time.

=== Seeding ===
Pot 1	Pot 2	Pot 3	Pot 4	Pot 5	Pot 6
Norway TH; Montenegro; Hungary; Denmark	Netherlands; Brazil; Germany; Poland	Angola; France; Serbia (host); Romania	South Korea; Spain; Czech Republic; China	Tunisia; DR Congo; Japan; Argentina	Dominican Republic; Paraguay; Algeria; Australia

- TH = Title holder

== Group stage ==
All times are local (UTC+1).

Twenty-four participating teams were placed in the following four groups. After playing a round-robin, the top four teams in each group advanced to the Knockout stage. The last two teams in each group played placement matches.

=== Tie-breaking criteria ===
If two or more teams have finished tied on an equal number of points, the finishing positions were set to be determined by the following tie-breaking criteria in the following order

1. number of points obtained in the matches among the teams in question
2. goal difference in the matches among the teams in question
3. number of goals scored in the matches among the teams in question (if more than two teams finish equal on points)
4. goal difference in all the group matches
5. number of goals scored in all the group matches
6. drawing of lots

=== Group A ===
Pos	Team	Pld	W	D	L	GF	GA	GD	Pts	Qualification
1	France	5	5	0	0	125	80	+45	10	Round of 16
2	Montenegro	5	4	0	1	135	92	+43	8	Round of 16
3	South Korea	5	3	0	2	158	117	+41	6	Round of 16
4	Netherlands	5	2	0	3	147	121	+26	4	Round of 16
5	DR Congo	5	1	0	4	86	155	−69	2	
6	Dominican Republic	5	0	0	5	92	178	−86	0	

7 December 2013; 14:45	Montenegro	24–22	South Korea	Pionir Hall, Belgrade; Attendance: 1,100; Referees: Lah, Sok (SLO)
7 December 2013; 14:45	Bulatović 7	(11–11)	Woo Sun-hee 8	Pionir Hall, Belgrade; Attendance: 1,100; Referees: Lah, Sok (SLO)
7 December 2013; 14:45	3× (yellow card) 4× (suspension)	Report	3× (yellow card) 4× (suspension)	Pionir Hall, Belgrade; Attendance: 1,100; Referees: Lah, Sok (SLO)

7 December 2013; 17:00	France	31–13	DR Congo	Pionir Hall, Belgrade; Attendance: 500; Referees: Marina, Minore (ARG)
7 December 2013; 17:00	Dembélé 5	(15–6)	Mwasesa 9	Pionir Hall, Belgrade; Attendance: 500; Referees: Marina, Minore (ARG)
7 December 2013; 17:00	3× (yellow card) 2× (suspension)	Report	2× (yellow card) 4× (suspension) 1× (red card)	Pionir Hall, Belgrade; Attendance: 500; Referees: Marina, Minore (ARG)

7 December 2013; 19:15	Netherlands	44–21	Dominican Republic	Pionir Hall, Belgrade; Attendance: 300; Referees: Arntsen, Røen (NOR)
7 December 2013; 19:15	Knippenborg 9	(20–9)	Pimentel, Pop 6	Pionir Hall, Belgrade; Attendance: 300; Referees: Arntsen, Røen (NOR)
7 December 2013; 19:15	3× (yellow card) 1× (suspension)	Report	2× (yellow card) 2× (suspension)	Pionir Hall, Belgrade; Attendance: 300; Referees: Arntsen, Røen (NOR)

8 December 2013; 16:00	South Korea	29–26	Netherlands	Pionir Hall, Belgrade; Attendance: 500; Referees: Horváth, Márton (HUN)
8 December 2013; 16:00	Kim Jin-yi 7	(17–11)	Van der Heijden, Groot 5	Pionir Hall, Belgrade; Attendance: 500; Referees: Horváth, Márton (HUN)
8 December 2013; 16:00	2× (yellow card) 3× (suspension)	Report	3× (yellow card) 4× (suspension)	Pionir Hall, Belgrade; Attendance: 500; Referees: Horváth, Márton (HUN)

8 December 2013; 18:15	DR Congo	9–35	Montenegro	Pionir Hall, Belgrade; Attendance: 726; Referees: Arntsen, Røen (NOR)
8 December 2013; 18:15	Lusamba 3	(4–19)	Miljanić-Petrovic, Bulatović 5	Pionir Hall, Belgrade; Attendance: 726; Referees: Arntsen, Røen (NOR)
8 December 2013; 18:15	2× (yellow card) 3× (suspension)	Report	3× (yellow card) 4× (suspension)	Pionir Hall, Belgrade; Attendance: 726; Referees: Arntsen, Røen (NOR)

8 December 2013; 20:30	Dominican Republic	10–27	France	Pionir Hall, Belgrade; Attendance: 250; Referees: Lah, Sok (SLO)
8 December 2013; 20:30	Andino 5	(4–10)	Baudouin 7	Pionir Hall, Belgrade; Attendance: 250; Referees: Lah, Sok (SLO)
8 December 2013; 20:30	3× (yellow card) 6× (suspension)	Report	3× (yellow card) 6× (suspension)	Pionir Hall, Belgrade; Attendance: 250; Referees: Lah, Sok (SLO)

10 December 2013; 16:00	South Korea	34–20	DR Congo	Pionir Hall, Belgrade; Attendance: 100; Referees: Arntsen, Røen (NOR)
10 December 2013; 16:00	Woo Sun-hee 7	(19–13)	Mwasesa 9	Pionir Hall, Belgrade; Attendance: 100; Referees: Arntsen, Røen (NOR)
10 December 2013; 16:00	2× (yellow card) 1× (suspension)	Report	2× (yellow card) 5× (suspension)	Pionir Hall, Belgrade; Attendance: 100; Referees: Arntsen, Røen (NOR)

10 December 2013; 18:15	Montenegro	33–19	Dominican Republic	Pionir Hall, Belgrade; Attendance: 200; Referees: Horváth, Márton (HUN)
10 December 2013; 18:15	Mehmedović 8	(17–10)	Peña 5	Pionir Hall, Belgrade; Attendance: 200; Referees: Horváth, Márton (HUN)
10 December 2013; 18:15	3× (yellow card) 4× (suspension)	Report	2× (yellow card) 4× (suspension)	Pionir Hall, Belgrade; Attendance: 200; Referees: Horváth, Márton (HUN)

10 December 2013; 20:30	Netherlands	19–23	France	Pionir Hall, Belgrade; Attendance: 400; Referees: Marina, Minore (ARG)
10 December 2013; 20:30	Abbingh 6	(10–10)	Signaté 6	Pionir Hall, Belgrade; Attendance: 400; Referees: Marina, Minore (ARG)
10 December 2013; 20:30	3× (yellow card) 5× (suspension)	Report	3× (yellow card) 5× (suspension)	Pionir Hall, Belgrade; Attendance: 400; Referees: Marina, Minore (ARG)

11 December 2013; 16:00	Dominican Republic	20–51	South Korea	Pionir Hall, Belgrade; Attendance: 150; Referees: Marina, Minore (ARG)
11 December 2013; 16:00	López 6	(8–27)	Kim Jin-yi 9	Pionir Hall, Belgrade; Attendance: 150; Referees: Marina, Minore (ARG)
11 December 2013; 16:00	2× (yellow card) 5× (suspension)	Report	3× (yellow card) 4× (suspension)	Pionir Hall, Belgrade; Attendance: 150; Referees: Marina, Minore (ARG)

11 December 2013; 18:15	Netherlands	33–21	DR Congo	Pionir Hall, Belgrade; Attendance: 300; Referees: Horváth, Márton (HUN)
11 December 2013; 18:15	three players 5	(18–11)	Mwasesa 8	Pionir Hall, Belgrade; Attendance: 300; Referees: Horváth, Márton (HUN)
11 December 2013; 18:15	3× (yellow card) 7× (suspension)	Report	1× (yellow card) 3× (suspension)	Pionir Hall, Belgrade; Attendance: 300; Referees: Horváth, Márton (HUN)

11 December 2013; 20:30	France	17–16	Montenegro	Pionir Hall, Belgrade; Attendance: 600; Referees: Arntsen, Røen (NOR)
11 December 2013; 20:30	three players 3	(6–8)	Jovanović 5	Pionir Hall, Belgrade; Attendance: 600; Referees: Arntsen, Røen (NOR)
11 December 2013; 20:30	2× (yellow card) 1× (suspension)	Report	4× (yellow card) 2× (suspension)	Pionir Hall, Belgrade; Attendance: 600; Referees: Arntsen, Røen (NOR)

13 December 2013; 16:15	DR Congo	23–22	Dominican Republic	Pionir Hall, Belgrade; Attendance: 150; Referees: Marina, Minore (ARG)
13 December 2013; 16:15	Okoko 8	(15–13)	Pop 6	Pionir Hall, Belgrade; Attendance: 150; Referees: Marina, Minore (ARG)
13 December 2013; 16:15	3× (yellow card) 4× (suspension)	Report	2× (yellow card) 2× (suspension)	Pionir Hall, Belgrade; Attendance: 150; Referees: Marina, Minore (ARG)

13 December 2013; 18:30	France	27–22	South Korea	Pionir Hall, Belgrade; Attendance: 700; Referees: Horváth, Márton (HUN)
13 December 2013; 18:30	Lacrabère 8	(11–10)	Ryu Eun-hee, Jung Ji-hae 6	Pionir Hall, Belgrade; Attendance: 700; Referees: Horváth, Márton (HUN)
13 December 2013; 18:30	4× (yellow card) 5× (suspension)	Report	3× (yellow card) 4× (suspension)	Pionir Hall, Belgrade; Attendance: 700; Referees: Horváth, Márton (HUN)

13 December 2013; 20:45	Montenegro	27–25	Netherlands	Pionir Hall, Belgrade; Attendance: 600; Referees: Santos, Fonseca (POR)
13 December 2013; 20:45	Radičević, Bulatović 8	(14–18)	Van der Heijden 7	Pionir Hall, Belgrade; Attendance: 600; Referees: Santos, Fonseca (POR)
13 December 2013; 20:45	3× (yellow card) 6× (suspension)	Report	3× (yellow card) 5× (suspension)	Pionir Hall, Belgrade; Attendance: 600; Referees: Santos, Fonseca (POR)

=== Group B ===
Pos	Team	Pld	W	D	L	GF	GA	GD	Pts	Qualification
1	Brazil	5	5	0	0	142	102	+40	10	Round of 16
2	Serbia	5	4	0	1	140	105	+35	8	Round of 16
3	Denmark	5	3	0	2	151	112	+39	6	Round of 16
4	Japan	5	2	0	3	136	131	+5	4	Round of 16
5	China	5	1	0	4	114	168	−54	2	
6	Algeria	5	0	0	5	102	167	−65	0	

6 December 2013; 18:00	Serbia	28–26	Japan	Čair Sports Center, Niš; Attendance: 3,800; Referees: García, Marín (ESP)
6 December 2013; 18:00	Lekić 6	(10–13)	Fujii 7	Čair Sports Center, Niš; Attendance: 3,800; Referees: García, Marín (ESP)
6 December 2013; 18:00	4× (yellow card) 6× (suspension)	Report	3× (yellow card) 4× (suspension)	Čair Sports Center, Niš; Attendance: 3,800; Referees: García, Marín (ESP)

7 December 2013; 18:00	Brazil	36–20	Algeria	Čair Sports Center, Niš; Attendance: 1,000; Referees: Duţă, Florescu (ROU)
7 December 2013; 18:00	da Silva 9	(21–7)	Tizi 6	Čair Sports Center, Niš; Attendance: 1,000; Referees: Duţă, Florescu (ROU)
7 December 2013; 18:00	3× (yellow card) 6× (suspension)	Report	3× (yellow card)	Čair Sports Center, Niš; Attendance: 1,000; Referees: Duţă, Florescu (ROU)

7 December 2013; 20:15	Denmark	44–21	China	Čair Sports Center, Niš; Attendance: 800; Referees: Krichen, Makhlouf (TUN)
7 December 2013; 20:15	Schumacher, Kristiansen 6	(19–13)	Zhao Jiaqin 5	Čair Sports Center, Niš; Attendance: 800; Referees: Krichen, Makhlouf (TUN)
7 December 2013; 20:15	3× (yellow card) 1× (suspension)	Report	2× (yellow card) 2× (suspension)	Čair Sports Center, Niš; Attendance: 800; Referees: Krichen, Makhlouf (TUN)

8 December 2013; 15:45	China	21–34	Brazil	Čair Sports Center, Niš; Attendance: 200; Referees: García, Marín (ESP)
8 December 2013; 15:45	Wang Shuihui 5	(12–19)	da Silva 9	Čair Sports Center, Niš; Attendance: 200; Referees: García, Marín (ESP)
8 December 2013; 15:45	3× (yellow card) 4× (suspension)	Report	3× (yellow card) 4× (suspension)	Čair Sports Center, Niš; Attendance: 200; Referees: García, Marín (ESP)

8 December 2013; 18:00	Algeria	14–34	Serbia	Čair Sports Center, Niš; Attendance: 3,500; Referees: Krichen, Makhlouf (TUN)
8 December 2013; 18:00	Ziadi 5	(6–18)	Nišavić 9	Čair Sports Center, Niš; Attendance: 3,500; Referees: Krichen, Makhlouf (TUN)
8 December 2013; 18:00	3× (yellow card) 3× (suspension)	Report	4× (yellow card) 3× (suspension) 1× (red card)	Čair Sports Center, Niš; Attendance: 3,500; Referees: Krichen, Makhlouf (TUN)

8 December 2013; 20:15	Japan	25–29	Denmark	Čair Sports Center, Niš; Attendance: 800; Referees: Gatelis, Mažeika (LTU)
8 December 2013; 20:15	Fujii 6	(13–13)	Kristiansen 10	Čair Sports Center, Niš; Attendance: 800; Referees: Gatelis, Mažeika (LTU)
8 December 2013; 20:15	3× (yellow card) 4× (suspension)	Report	3× (yellow card) 4× (suspension)	Čair Sports Center, Niš; Attendance: 800; Referees: Gatelis, Mažeika (LTU)

10 December 2013; 15:45	China	27–33	Japan	Čair Sports Center, Niš; Attendance: 500; Referees: Duţă, Florescu (ROU)
10 December 2013; 15:45	Zhao Jiaqin 6	(12–16)	Fujii 10	Čair Sports Center, Niš; Attendance: 500; Referees: Duţă, Florescu (ROU)
10 December 2013; 15:45	3× (yellow card) 6× (suspension)	Report	3× (yellow card)	Čair Sports Center, Niš; Attendance: 500; Referees: Duţă, Florescu (ROU)

10 December 2013; 18:00	Brazil	25–23	Serbia	Čair Sports Center, Niš; Attendance: 3,800; Referees: Gatelis, Mažeika (LTU)
10 December 2013; 18:00	Amorim, do Nascimento 5	(14–11)	Krpež 5	Čair Sports Center, Niš; Attendance: 3,800; Referees: Gatelis, Mažeika (LTU)
10 December 2013; 18:00	3× (yellow card) 7× (suspension)	Report	4× (yellow card) 3× (suspension)	Čair Sports Center, Niš; Attendance: 3,800; Referees: Gatelis, Mažeika (LTU)

10 December 2013; 20:15	Denmark	38–20	Algeria	Čair Sports Center, Niš; Attendance: 400; Referees: García, Marín (ESP)
10 December 2013; 20:15	Hansen 8	(21–8)	Belakhdar 9	Čair Sports Center, Niš; Attendance: 400; Referees: García, Marín (ESP)
10 December 2013; 20:15	3× (yellow card) 7× (suspension)	Report	2× (yellow card) 1× (suspension)	Čair Sports Center, Niš; Attendance: 400; Referees: García, Marín (ESP)

11 December 2013; 15:45	Brazil	24–20	Japan	Čair Sports Center, Niš; Attendance: 300; Referees: Krichen, Makhlouf (TUN)
11 December 2013; 15:45	do Nascimento 5	(12–8)	Fujii, Tanabe 4	Čair Sports Center, Niš; Attendance: 300; Referees: Krichen, Makhlouf (TUN)
11 December 2013; 15:45	4× (yellow card) 5× (suspension)	Report	3× (yellow card) 5× (suspension)	Čair Sports Center, Niš; Attendance: 300; Referees: Krichen, Makhlouf (TUN)

11 December 2013; 18:00	Algeria	25–27	China	Čair Sports Center, Niš; Attendance: 1,000; Referees: Gatelis, Mažeika (LTU)
11 December 2013; 18:00	Tizi 7	(14–15)	Wang Shuihui 13	Čair Sports Center, Niš; Attendance: 1,000; Referees: Gatelis, Mažeika (LTU)
11 December 2013; 18:00	3× (yellow card) 2× (suspension)	Report	3× (yellow card) 5× (suspension)	Čair Sports Center, Niš; Attendance: 1,000; Referees: Gatelis, Mažeika (LTU)

11 December 2013; 20:15	Serbia	23–22	Denmark	Čair Sports Center, Niš; Attendance: 3,800; Referees: García, Marín (ESP)
11 December 2013; 20:15	Lekić 6	(12–12)	Fisker, Burgaard 4	Čair Sports Center, Niš; Attendance: 3,800; Referees: García, Marín (ESP)
11 December 2013; 20:15	2× (yellow card) 4× (suspension)	Report	3× (yellow card) 6× (suspension)	Čair Sports Center, Niš; Attendance: 3,800; Referees: García, Marín (ESP)

13 December 2013; 15:45	Japan	32–23	Algeria	Čair Sports Center, Niš; Attendance: 200; Referees: Duţă, Florescu (ROU)
13 December 2013; 15:45	Fujii, Hara 6	(16–12)	Tizi 8	Čair Sports Center, Niš; Attendance: 200; Referees: Duţă, Florescu (ROU)
13 December 2013; 15:45	3× (yellow card) 4× (suspension)	Report	3× (yellow card) 3× (suspension)	Čair Sports Center, Niš; Attendance: 200; Referees: Duţă, Florescu (ROU)

13 December 2013; 18:00	Serbia	32–18	China	Čair Sports Center, Niš; Attendance: 3,700; Referees: Krichen, Makhlouf (TUN)
13 December 2013; 18:00	Lekić 8	(19–10)	Zhao Jiaqin 6	Čair Sports Center, Niš; Attendance: 3,700; Referees: Krichen, Makhlouf (TUN)
13 December 2013; 18:00	2× (yellow card) 1× (suspension)	Report	3× (yellow card) 4× (suspension)	Čair Sports Center, Niš; Attendance: 3,700; Referees: Krichen, Makhlouf (TUN)

13 December 2013; 20:15	Denmark	18–23	Brazil	Čair Sports Center, Niš; Attendance: 1,000; Referees: Gatelis, Mažeika (LTU)
13 December 2013; 20:15	Fisker 5	(9–14)	Cavaleiro 7	Čair Sports Center, Niš; Attendance: 1,000; Referees: Gatelis, Mažeika (LTU)
13 December 2013; 20:15	3× (yellow card) 6× (suspension)	Report	4× (yellow card) 5× (suspension)	Čair Sports Center, Niš; Attendance: 1,000; Referees: Gatelis, Mažeika (LTU)

=== Group C ===
Pos	Team	Pld	W	D	L	GF	GA	GD	Pts	Qualification
1	Norway	5	5	0	0	142	90	+52	10	Round of 16
2	Spain	5	4	0	1	130	91	+39	8	Round of 16
3	Poland	5	3	0	2	141	95	+46	6	Round of 16
4	Angola	5	2	0	3	135	123	+12	4	Round of 16
5	Argentina	5	1	0	4	102	141	−39	2	
6	Paraguay	5	0	0	5	55	165	−110	0	

7 December 2013; 15:45	Angola	33–23	Argentina	Medison Hall, Zrenjanin; Attendance: 1,000; Referees: Al-Mutawa, Al-Suwailam (KUW)
7 December 2013; 15:45	Guialo 8	(15–12)	Belotti 6	Medison Hall, Zrenjanin; Attendance: 1,000; Referees: Al-Mutawa, Al-Suwailam (KUW)
7 December 2013; 15:45	3× (yellow card) 6× (suspension)	Report	2× (yellow card) 6× (suspension)	Medison Hall, Zrenjanin; Attendance: 1,000; Referees: Al-Mutawa, Al-Suwailam (KUW)

7 December 2013; 18:00	Poland	40–6	Paraguay	Medison Hall, Zrenjanin; Attendance: 1,000; Referees: Engberg, Laurell (SWE)
7 December 2013; 18:00	Koniuszaniec 8	(19–4)	Faría 3	Medison Hall, Zrenjanin; Attendance: 1,000; Referees: Engberg, Laurell (SWE)
7 December 2013; 18:00	3× (yellow card) 3× (suspension)	Report	3× (yellow card) 2× (suspension)	Medison Hall, Zrenjanin; Attendance: 1,000; Referees: Engberg, Laurell (SWE)

7 December 2013; 20:15	Norway	22–20	Spain	Medison Hall, Zrenjanin; Attendance: 2,000; Referees: Mošorinski, Pandžić (SRB)
7 December 2013; 20:15	Mørk 8	(11–10)	three players 4	Medison Hall, Zrenjanin; Attendance: 2,000; Referees: Mošorinski, Pandžić (SRB)
7 December 2013; 20:15	3× (yellow card) 4× (suspension)	Report	4× (yellow card) 3× (suspension)	Medison Hall, Zrenjanin; Attendance: 2,000; Referees: Mošorinski, Pandžić (SRB)

9 December 2013; 15:45	Paraguay	12–37	Angola	Medison Hall, Zrenjanin; Attendance: 500; Referees: Mošorinski, Pandžić (SRB)
9 December 2013; 15:45	Gómez 6	(7–18)	Bernardo 9	Medison Hall, Zrenjanin; Attendance: 500; Referees: Mošorinski, Pandžić (SRB)
9 December 2013; 15:45	3× (yellow card) 5× (suspension)	Report	3× (yellow card) 1× (suspension)	Medison Hall, Zrenjanin; Attendance: 500; Referees: Mošorinski, Pandžić (SRB)

9 December 2013; 18:00	Spain	26–20	Poland	Medison Hall, Zrenjanin; Attendance: 1,000; Referees: Al-Mutawa, Al-Suwailam (KUW)
9 December 2013; 18:00	Barbosa 8	(11–11)	three players 4	Medison Hall, Zrenjanin; Attendance: 1,000; Referees: Al-Mutawa, Al-Suwailam (KUW)
9 December 2013; 18:00	3× (yellow card) 5× (suspension)	Report	2× (yellow card) 4× (suspension)	Medison Hall, Zrenjanin; Attendance: 1,000; Referees: Al-Mutawa, Al-Suwailam (KUW)

9 December 2013; 20:15	Argentina	18–37	Norway	Medison Hall, Zrenjanin; Attendance: 2,000; Referees: Santos, Fonseca (POR)
9 December 2013; 20:15	Mendoza 4	(9–15)	Alstad 6	Medison Hall, Zrenjanin; Attendance: 2,000; Referees: Santos, Fonseca (POR)
9 December 2013; 20:15	3× (yellow card) 5× (suspension)	Report	3× (yellow card) 5× (suspension)	Medison Hall, Zrenjanin; Attendance: 2,000; Referees: Santos, Fonseca (POR)

10 December 2013; 15:45	Poland	32–23	Angola	Medison Hall, Zrenjanin; Attendance: 800; Referees: Santos, Fonseca (POR)
10 December 2013; 15:45	Grzyb, Koniuszaniec 7	(18–13)	Bernardo 5	Medison Hall, Zrenjanin; Attendance: 800; Referees: Santos, Fonseca (POR)
10 December 2013; 15:45	4× (yellow card) 6× (suspension)	Report	2× (yellow card) 2× (suspension)	Medison Hall, Zrenjanin; Attendance: 800; Referees: Santos, Fonseca (POR)

10 December 2013; 18:00	Spain	25–19	Argentina	Medison Hall, Zrenjanin; Attendance: 1,000; Referees: Engberg, Laurell (SWE)
10 December 2013; 18:00	Fernández, Pena 6	(14–11)	Haro 5	Medison Hall, Zrenjanin; Attendance: 1,000; Referees: Engberg, Laurell (SWE)
10 December 2013; 18:00	3× (yellow card) 5× (suspension)	Report	2× (yellow card) 1× (suspension)	Medison Hall, Zrenjanin; Attendance: 1,000; Referees: Engberg, Laurell (SWE)

10 December 2013; 20:15	Norway	34–13	Paraguay	Medison Hall, Zrenjanin; Attendance: 800; Referees: Al-Mutawa, Al-Suwailam (KUW)
10 December 2013; 20:15	four players 4	(17–8)	Cáceres 4	Medison Hall, Zrenjanin; Attendance: 800; Referees: Al-Mutawa, Al-Suwailam (KUW)
10 December 2013; 20:15	2× (yellow card) 5× (suspension) 1× (red card)	Report	3× (yellow card) 2× (suspension)	Medison Hall, Zrenjanin; Attendance: 800; Referees: Al-Mutawa, Al-Suwailam (KUW)

12 December 2013; 15:45	Paraguay	9–29	Spain	Medison Hall, Zrenjanin; Attendance: 500; Referees: Santos, Fonseca (POR)
12 December 2013; 15:45	Faría 4	(0–14)	Aguilar, López 4	Medison Hall, Zrenjanin; Attendance: 500; Referees: Santos, Fonseca (POR)
12 December 2013; 15:45	2× (yellow card) 2× (suspension) 1× (red card)	Report	3× (yellow card) 4× (suspension)	Medison Hall, Zrenjanin; Attendance: 500; Referees: Santos, Fonseca (POR)

12 December 2013; 18:00	Poland	31–17	Argentina	Medison Hall, Zrenjanin; Attendance: 1,500; Referees: Mošorinski, Pandžić (SRB)
12 December 2013; 18:00	Wojtas 8	(14–9)	Mendoza 6	Medison Hall, Zrenjanin; Attendance: 1,500; Referees: Mošorinski, Pandžić (SRB)
12 December 2013; 18:00	3× (yellow card) 7× (suspension)	Report	3× (yellow card) 5× (suspension)	Medison Hall, Zrenjanin; Attendance: 1,500; Referees: Mošorinski, Pandžić (SRB)

12 December 2013; 20:15	Angola	21–26	Norway	Medison Hall, Zrenjanin; Attendance: 1,200; Referees: Al-Mutawa, Al-Suwailam (KUW)
12 December 2013; 20:15	M. Kiala 6	(9–12)	three players 5	Medison Hall, Zrenjanin; Attendance: 1,200; Referees: Al-Mutawa, Al-Suwailam (KUW)
12 December 2013; 20:15	2× (yellow card) 2× (suspension)	Report	3× (yellow card) 6× (suspension)	Medison Hall, Zrenjanin; Attendance: 1,200; Referees: Al-Mutawa, Al-Suwailam (KUW)

13 December 2013; 15:45	Argentina	25–15	Paraguay	Medison Hall, Zrenjanin; Attendance: 500; Referees: Engberg, Laurell (SWE)
13 December 2013; 15:45	Alonso 7	(13–5)	Faría 6	Medison Hall, Zrenjanin; Attendance: 500; Referees: Engberg, Laurell (SWE)
13 December 2013; 15:45	3× (yellow card) 2× (suspension)	Report	3× (yellow card) 3× (suspension)	Medison Hall, Zrenjanin; Attendance: 500; Referees: Engberg, Laurell (SWE)

13 December 2013; 18:00	Angola	21–30	Spain	Medison Hall, Zrenjanin; Attendance: 2,000; Referees: Koo, Lee (KOR)
13 December 2013; 18:00	Guialo 10	(10–14)	Barbosa 9	Medison Hall, Zrenjanin; Attendance: 2,000; Referees: Koo, Lee (KOR)
13 December 2013; 18:00	3× (yellow card) 2× (suspension)	Report	3× (yellow card) 4× (suspension)	Medison Hall, Zrenjanin; Attendance: 2,000; Referees: Koo, Lee (KOR)

13 December 2013; 20:15	Norway	23–18	Poland	Medison Hall, Zrenjanin; Attendance: 1,500; Referees: Lah, Sok (SLO)
13 December 2013; 20:15	Sulland 6	(13–10)	Wojtas, Semeniuk-Olchawa 4	Medison Hall, Zrenjanin; Attendance: 1,500; Referees: Lah, Sok (SLO)
13 December 2013; 20:15	3× (yellow card) 3× (suspension)	Report	3× (yellow card) 2× (suspension)	Medison Hall, Zrenjanin; Attendance: 1,500; Referees: Lah, Sok (SLO)

=== Group D ===
Pos	Team	Pld	W	D	L	GF	GA	GD	Pts	Qualification
1	Germany	5	5	0	0	152	116	+36	10	Round of 16
2	Romania	5	4	0	1	132	96	+36	8	Round of 16
3	Hungary	5	3	0	2	143	114	+29	6	Round of 16
4	Czech Republic	5	2	0	3	144	135	+9	4	Round of 16
5	Tunisia	5	1	0	4	109	122	−13	2	
6	Australia	5	0	0	5	68	165	−97	0	

7 December 2013; 14:45	Hungary	35–27	Czech Republic	Spens Sports Center, Novi Sad; Attendance: 800; Referees: Bonaventura, Bonaventura (FRA)
7 December 2013; 14:45	Görbicz 9	(18–16)	Knedlíková 6	Spens Sports Center, Novi Sad; Attendance: 800; Referees: Bonaventura, Bonaventura (FRA)
7 December 2013; 14:45	3× (yellow card) 2× (suspension)	Report	4× (yellow card) 4× (suspension) 1× (red card)	Spens Sports Center, Novi Sad; Attendance: 800; Referees: Bonaventura, Bonaventura (FRA)

7 December 2013; 17:00	Germany	36–15	Australia	Spens Sports Center, Novi Sad; Attendance: 700; Referees: Koo, Lee (KOR)
7 December 2013; 17:00	Müller, Zapf 6	(17–7)	Potocki 9	Spens Sports Center, Novi Sad; Attendance: 700; Referees: Koo, Lee (KOR)
7 December 2013; 17:00	2× (yellow card) 3× (suspension)	Report	3× (yellow card) 3× (suspension)	Spens Sports Center, Novi Sad; Attendance: 700; Referees: Koo, Lee (KOR)

7 December 2013; 19:15	Romania	27–17	Tunisia	Spens Sports Center, Novi Sad; Attendance: 900; Referees: Birch, Stenrand (DEN)
7 December 2013; 19:15	Neagu, Perianu 6	(15–8)	Chebbah 5	Spens Sports Center, Novi Sad; Attendance: 900; Referees: Birch, Stenrand (DEN)
7 December 2013; 19:15	3× (yellow card) 6× (suspension)	Report	3× (yellow card) 1× (suspension)	Spens Sports Center, Novi Sad; Attendance: 900; Referees: Birch, Stenrand (DEN)

9 December 2013; 14:45	Tunisia	24–26	Hungary	Spens Sports Center, Novi Sad; Attendance: 400; Referees: Koo, Lee (KOR)
9 December 2013; 14:45	Dhaouadi 6	(15–15)	Görbicz, Tomori 6	Spens Sports Center, Novi Sad; Attendance: 400; Referees: Koo, Lee (KOR)
9 December 2013; 14:45	2× (yellow card) 4× (suspension)	Report	2× (yellow card) 5× (suspension)	Spens Sports Center, Novi Sad; Attendance: 400; Referees: Koo, Lee (KOR)

9 December 2013; 17:00	Czech Republic	32–37	Germany	Spens Sports Center, Novi Sad; Attendance: 800; Referees: Coulibaly, Diabaté (CIV)
9 December 2013; 17:00	Luzumová 9	(13–17)	Müller 11	Spens Sports Center, Novi Sad; Attendance: 800; Referees: Coulibaly, Diabaté (CIV)
9 December 2013; 17:00	2× (yellow card) 4× (suspension)	Report	3× (yellow card) 6× (suspension)	Spens Sports Center, Novi Sad; Attendance: 800; Referees: Coulibaly, Diabaté (CIV)

9 December 2013; 19:15	Australia	13–32	Romania	Spens Sports Center, Novi Sad; Attendance: 300; Referees: Bonaventura, Bonaventura (FRA)
9 December 2013; 19:15	Potocki 5	(7–16)	Ciuciulete 7	Spens Sports Center, Novi Sad; Attendance: 300; Referees: Bonaventura, Bonaventura (FRA)
9 December 2013; 19:15	3× (yellow card) 2× (suspension)	Report	2× (yellow card) 1× (suspension)	Spens Sports Center, Novi Sad; Attendance: 300; Referees: Bonaventura, Bonaventura (FRA)

10 December 2013; 14:45	Czech Republic	28–24	Tunisia	Spens Sports Center, Novi Sad; Attendance: 400; Referees: Bonaventura, Bonaventura (FRA)
10 December 2013; 14:45	Luzumová, Štěrbová 6	(15–14)	Chebbah 7	Spens Sports Center, Novi Sad; Attendance: 400; Referees: Bonaventura, Bonaventura (FRA)
10 December 2013; 14:45	2× (yellow card) 1× (suspension)	Report	2× (yellow card) 7× (suspension)	Spens Sports Center, Novi Sad; Attendance: 400; Referees: Bonaventura, Bonaventura (FRA)

10 December 2013; 17:00	Germany	26–23	Romania	Spens Sports Center, Novi Sad; Attendance: 800; Referees: Birch, Stenrand (DEN)
10 December 2013; 17:00	Müller 11	(13–12)	Nechita 6	Spens Sports Center, Novi Sad; Attendance: 800; Referees: Birch, Stenrand (DEN)
10 December 2013; 17:00	3× (yellow card) 2× (suspension)	Report	3× (yellow card) 1× (suspension)	Spens Sports Center, Novi Sad; Attendance: 800; Referees: Birch, Stenrand (DEN)

10 December 2013; 19:15	Hungary	39–15	Australia	Spens Sports Center, Novi Sad; Attendance: 400; Referees: Coulibaly, Diabaté (CIV)
10 December 2013; 19:15	Rédei Soós, Vincze 6	(19–11)	Potocki 8	Spens Sports Center, Novi Sad; Attendance: 400; Referees: Coulibaly, Diabaté (CIV)
10 December 2013; 19:15	3× (yellow card) 1× (suspension)	Report	2× (yellow card) 1× (suspension) 1× (red card)	Spens Sports Center, Novi Sad; Attendance: 400; Referees: Coulibaly, Diabaté (CIV)

12 December 2013; 14:45	Australia	10–34	Czech Republic	Spens Sports Center, Novi Sad; Attendance: 400; Referees: Birch, Stenrand (DEN)
12 December 2013; 14:45	Boyd 3	(4–15)	Crhová 8	Spens Sports Center, Novi Sad; Attendance: 400; Referees: Birch, Stenrand (DEN)
12 December 2013; 14:45	2× (yellow card) 1× (suspension)	Report		Spens Sports Center, Novi Sad; Attendance: 400; Referees: Birch, Stenrand (DEN)

12 December 2013; 17:00	Germany	26–20	Tunisia	Spens Sports Center, Novi Sad; Attendance: 1,200; Referees: Koo, Lee (KOR)
12 December 2013; 17:00	Loerper 6	(10–11)	Chebbah 6	Spens Sports Center, Novi Sad; Attendance: 1,200; Referees: Koo, Lee (KOR)
12 December 2013; 17:00	3× (yellow card) 1× (suspension)	Report	3× (yellow card) 1× (suspension)	Spens Sports Center, Novi Sad; Attendance: 1,200; Referees: Koo, Lee (KOR)

12 December 2013; 19:15	Romania	21–17	Hungary	Spens Sports Center, Novi Sad; Attendance: 5,000; Referees: Coulibaly, Diabaté (CIV)
12 December 2013; 19:15	Neagu 4	(8–10)	Görbicz 7	Spens Sports Center, Novi Sad; Attendance: 5,000; Referees: Coulibaly, Diabaté (CIV)
12 December 2013; 19:15	4× (yellow card) 5× (suspension)	Report	3× (yellow card) 2× (suspension)	Spens Sports Center, Novi Sad; Attendance: 5,000; Referees: Coulibaly, Diabaté (CIV)

13 December 2013; 14:45	Tunisia	24–15	Australia	Spens Sports Center, Novi Sad; Attendance: 300; Referees: Coulibaly, Diabaté (CIV)
13 December 2013; 14:45	Dhaouadi 6	(12–8)	Potocki 7	Spens Sports Center, Novi Sad; Attendance: 300; Referees: Coulibaly, Diabaté (CIV)
13 December 2013; 14:45	3× (yellow card) 3× (suspension)	Report	2× (yellow card)	Spens Sports Center, Novi Sad; Attendance: 300; Referees: Coulibaly, Diabaté (CIV)

13 December 2013; 17:00	Hungary	26–27	Germany	Spens Sports Center, Novi Sad; Attendance: 3,000; Referees: Bonaventura, Bonaventura (FRA)
13 December 2013; 17:00	Görbicz 12	(16–14)	Müller 13	Spens Sports Center, Novi Sad; Attendance: 3,000; Referees: Bonaventura, Bonaventura (FRA)
13 December 2013; 17:00	2× (yellow card) 4× (suspension)	Report	2× (yellow card) 3× (suspension)	Spens Sports Center, Novi Sad; Attendance: 3,000; Referees: Bonaventura, Bonaventura (FRA)

13 December 2013; 19:15	Romania	29–23	Czech Republic	Spens Sports Center, Novi Sad; Attendance: 700; Referees: Mošorinski, Pandžić (SRB)
13 December 2013; 19:15	Neagu 5	(14–7)	Keclíková, Luzumová 4	Spens Sports Center, Novi Sad; Attendance: 700; Referees: Mošorinski, Pandžić (SRB)
13 December 2013; 19:15	3× (yellow card) 4× (suspension)	Report	4× (yellow card) 3× (suspension)	Spens Sports Center, Novi Sad; Attendance: 700; Referees: Mošorinski, Pandžić (SRB)

== President's Cup ==
=== 17–20th place playoff ===
17–20th place semifinals
15 December
DR Congo	22
China	23
15 December
Argentina	21
Tunisia	27

17th place game
16 December
China	23
Tunisia	28
19th place game
16 December
DR Congo	19
Argentina	31

==== 17–20th place semifinals ====
15 December 2013; 17:45	DR Congo	22–23	China	Čair Sports Center, Niš; Attendance: 300; Referees: Duţă, Diabaté
15 December 2013; 17:45	Mwasesa 6	(8–11)	Zhao Jiaqin 7	Čair Sports Center, Niš; Attendance: 300; Referees: Duţă, Diabaté
15 December 2013; 17:45	3× (yellow card) 2× (suspension)	Report	3× (yellow card) 2× (suspension)	Čair Sports Center, Niš; Attendance: 300; Referees: Duţă, Diabaté

15 December 2013; 20:00	Argentina	21–27	Tunisia	Čair Sports Center, Niš; Attendance: 300; Referees: Engberg, Røen
15 December 2013; 20:00	Gambino 5	(12–14)	Sfar-Ben-Chker 8	Čair Sports Center, Niš; Attendance: 300; Referees: Engberg, Røen
15 December 2013; 20:00	1× (yellow card) 1× (suspension)	Report	4× (yellow card) 4× (suspension)	Čair Sports Center, Niš; Attendance: 300; Referees: Engberg, Røen

==== 19th place game ====
16 December 2013; 17:45	DR Congo	19–31	Argentina	Čair Sports Center, Niš; Attendance: 250; Referees: Røen, Lee
16 December 2013; 17:45	Mwasesa 4	(7–14)	Decilio, Bianchi 7	Čair Sports Center, Niš; Attendance: 250; Referees: Røen, Lee
16 December 2013; 17:45	3× (yellow card) 6× (suspension)	Report	3× (yellow card) 1× (suspension)	Čair Sports Center, Niš; Attendance: 250; Referees: Røen, Lee

==== 17th place game ====
16 December 2013; 20:00	China	23–28	Tunisia	Čair Sports Center, Niš; Attendance: 300; Referees: Coulibaly, Arntsen
16 December 2013; 20:00	Zhao Jiaqin 7	(11–12)	Toumi 12	Čair Sports Center, Niš; Attendance: 300; Referees: Coulibaly, Arntsen
16 December 2013; 20:00	3× (yellow card) 3× (suspension)	Report	2× (yellow card) 1× (suspension)	Čair Sports Center, Niš; Attendance: 300; Referees: Coulibaly, Arntsen

=== 21st–24th place playoff ===
21st–24th place semifinals
15 December
Dominican Republic	24
Algeria	29
15 December
Paraguay (SO)	18 (5)
Australia	18 (3)

21st place game
16 December
Algeria	19
Paraguay	29
23rd place game
16 December
Dominican Republic	27
Australia	26

==== 21st–24th place semifinals ====
15 December 2013; 13:15	Dominican Republic	24–29	Algeria	Čair Sports Center, Niš; Attendance: 300; Referees: Laurell, Lee
15 December 2013; 13:15	Pop 7	(9–12)	Ziadi 5	Čair Sports Center, Niš; Attendance: 300; Referees: Laurell, Lee
15 December 2013; 13:15	3× (yellow card) 4× (suspension)	Report	3× (yellow card) 3× (suspension)	Čair Sports Center, Niš; Attendance: 300; Referees: Laurell, Lee

15 December 2013
15:30
Paraguay
18–18
Australia
Čair Sports Center, Niš
Attendance: 300
Referees: Florescu, Koo
Acuña 9
(12–10)
Potocki 8
3× (yellow card) 5× (suspension)
Report
4× (yellow card) 6× (suspension)

FT: 18–18 Pen: 5–3

==== 23rd place game ====
16 December 2013; 13:15	Dominican Republic	27–26	Australia	Čair Sports Center, Niš; Attendance: 200; Referees: Al-Mutawa, Al-Suwailam (KUW)
16 December 2013; 13:15	three players 6	(18–9)	Potocki 11	Čair Sports Center, Niš; Attendance: 200; Referees: Al-Mutawa, Al-Suwailam (KUW)
16 December 2013; 13:15	2× (yellow card) 6× (suspension)	Report	3× (yellow card) 1× (suspension)	Čair Sports Center, Niš; Attendance: 200; Referees: Al-Mutawa, Al-Suwailam (KUW)

==== 21st place game ====
16 December 2013; 15:30	Algeria	19–29	Paraguay	Čair Sports Center, Niš; Attendance: 300; Referees: Laurell, Florescu
16 December 2013; 15:30	Iberaken 5	(10–13)	three players 7	Čair Sports Center, Niš; Attendance: 300; Referees: Laurell, Florescu
16 December 2013; 15:30	2× (yellow card) 5× (suspension)	Report	3× (yellow card) 4× (suspension)	Čair Sports Center, Niš; Attendance: 300; Referees: Laurell, Florescu

== Knockout stage ==
=== Bracket ===
Round of 16
B1	Brazil	29
A4	Netherlands	23
D3	Hungary	28
C2	Spain	21
B3	Denmark	22
A2	Montenegro	21
D1	Germany	29
C4	Angola	21
C3	Poland	31
D2	Romania	29
A1	France	27
B4	Japan	19
A3	South Korea	27
B2	Serbia	28
C1	Norway	31
D4	Czech Republic	21

Quarterfinals
B1	Brazil (ET)	33
D3	Hungary	31
B3	Denmark	31
D1	Germany	28
C3	Poland	22
A1	France	21
B2	Serbia	28
C1	Norway	25

Semifinals
B1	Brazil	27
B3	Denmark	21
C3	Poland	18
B2	Serbia	24

Final
B1	Brazil	22
B2	Serbia	20
Third place
B3	Denmark	30
C3	Poland	26

==== Round of 16 ====
15 December 2013; 17:30	Germany	29–21	Angola	Spens Sports Center, Novi Sad; Attendance: 1,000; Referees: Lah, Sok (SLO)
15 December 2013; 17:30	Steinbach 6	(13–10)	M. Kiala 8	Spens Sports Center, Novi Sad; Attendance: 1,000; Referees: Lah, Sok (SLO)
15 December 2013; 17:30	3× (yellow card) 2× (suspension)	Report	2× (yellow card) 3× (suspension)	Spens Sports Center, Novi Sad; Attendance: 1,000; Referees: Lah, Sok (SLO)

15 December 2013; 18:00	France	27–19	Japan	Kombank Arena, Belgrade; Attendance: 510; Referees: Krichen, Makhlouf (TUN)
15 December 2013; 18:00	Kamto Njitam 5	(12–9)	Arihama, Fujii 5	Kombank Arena, Belgrade; Attendance: 510; Referees: Krichen, Makhlouf (TUN)
15 December 2013; 18:00	4× (yellow card) 8× (suspension)	Report	3× (yellow card) 7× (suspension)	Kombank Arena, Belgrade; Attendance: 510; Referees: Krichen, Makhlouf (TUN)

15 December 2013; 20:15	Poland	31–29	Romania	Spens Sports Center, Novi Sad; Attendance: 2,000; Referees: Mošorinski, Pandžić (SRB)
15 December 2013; 20:15	Wojtas 9	(13–17)	Neagu 10	Spens Sports Center, Novi Sad; Attendance: 2,000; Referees: Mošorinski, Pandžić (SRB)
15 December 2013; 20:15	3× (yellow card) 2× (suspension)	Report	3× (yellow card) 1× (suspension)	Spens Sports Center, Novi Sad; Attendance: 2,000; Referees: Mošorinski, Pandžić (SRB)

15 December 2013; 20:45	Denmark	22–21	Montenegro	Kombank Arena, Belgrade; Attendance: 1,100; Referees: García, Marín (ESP)
15 December 2013; 20:45	Burgaard 6	(11–12)	Bulatović 7	Kombank Arena, Belgrade; Attendance: 1,100; Referees: García, Marín (ESP)
15 December 2013; 20:45	3× (yellow card) 4× (suspension)	Report	3× (yellow card) 3× (suspension)	Kombank Arena, Belgrade; Attendance: 1,100; Referees: García, Marín (ESP)

16 December 2013; 17:30	Hungary	28–21	Spain	Spens Sports Center, Novi Sad; Attendance: 1,500; Referees: Birch, Stenrand (DEN)
16 December 2013; 17:30	Görbicz 6	(17–12)	López 7	Spens Sports Center, Novi Sad; Attendance: 1,500; Referees: Birch, Stenrand (DEN)
16 December 2013; 17:30	2× (yellow card) 2× (suspension)	Report	3× (yellow card) 2× (suspension)	Spens Sports Center, Novi Sad; Attendance: 1,500; Referees: Birch, Stenrand (DEN)

16 December 2013; 18:00	Brazil	29–23	Netherlands	Kombank Arena, Belgrade; Attendance: 300; Referees: Horváth, Márton (HUN)
16 December 2013; 18:00	Rodrigues 7	(16–14)	Abbingh 7	Kombank Arena, Belgrade; Attendance: 300; Referees: Horváth, Márton (HUN)
16 December 2013; 18:00	3× (yellow card) 5× (suspension)	Report	3× (yellow card) 7× (suspension)	Kombank Arena, Belgrade; Attendance: 300; Referees: Horváth, Márton (HUN)

16 December 2013; 20:15	Norway	31–21	Czech Republic	Spens Sports Center, Novi Sad; Attendance: 1,000; Referees: Marina, Minore (ARG)
16 December 2013; 20:15	Løke, Mørk 5	(19–10)	Luzumová 6	Spens Sports Center, Novi Sad; Attendance: 1,000; Referees: Marina, Minore (ARG)
16 December 2013; 20:15	3× (yellow card) 2× (suspension)	Report	3× (yellow card) 4× (suspension)	Spens Sports Center, Novi Sad; Attendance: 1,000; Referees: Marina, Minore (ARG)

16 December 2013; 20:45	South Korea	27–28	Serbia	Kombank Arena, Belgrade; Attendance: 12,000; Referees: Santos, Fonseca (POR)
16 December 2013; 20:45	Jung Ji-hae 8	(12–13)	Lekić 8	Kombank Arena, Belgrade; Attendance: 12,000; Referees: Santos, Fonseca (POR)
16 December 2013; 20:45	1× (yellow card) 3× (suspension)	Report	4× (yellow card) 3× (suspension)	Kombank Arena, Belgrade; Attendance: 12,000; Referees: Santos, Fonseca (POR)

==== Quarterfinals ====
18 December 2013
17:30
Brazil
33–31 (ET)
Hungary
Kombank Arena, Belgrade
Attendance: 7,500
Referees: Mošorinski, Pandžić (SRB)
do Nascimento 10
(12–11)
Tomori 7
2× (yellow card) 9× (suspension)
Report
1× (yellow card) 4× (suspension)

FT: 26–26 ET: 3–3, 4–2

18 December 2013; 17:30	Poland	22–21	France	Spens Sports Center, Novi Sad; Attendance: 1,000; Referees: Birch, Stenrand (DEN)
18 December 2013; 17:30	Siódmiak, Wojtas 5	(11–8)	Pineau, Dembélé 5	Spens Sports Center, Novi Sad; Attendance: 1,000; Referees: Birch, Stenrand (DEN)
18 December 2013; 17:30	3× (yellow card) 4× (suspension)	Report	4× (yellow card) 1× (suspension)	Spens Sports Center, Novi Sad; Attendance: 1,000; Referees: Birch, Stenrand (DEN)

18 December 2013; 20:15	Serbia	28–25	Norway	Kombank Arena, Belgrade; Attendance: 16,028; Referees: Gatelis, Mažeika (LTU)
18 December 2013; 20:15	Damnjanović, Cvijić 8	(15–16)	Løke 5	Kombank Arena, Belgrade; Attendance: 16,028; Referees: Gatelis, Mažeika (LTU)
18 December 2013; 20:15	3× (yellow card) 2× (suspension)	Report	3× (yellow card)	Kombank Arena, Belgrade; Attendance: 16,028; Referees: Gatelis, Mažeika (LTU)

18 December 2013; 20:15	Denmark	31–28	Germany	Spens Sports Center, Novi Sad; Attendance: 2,500; Referees: Bonaventura, Bonaventura (FRA)
18 December 2013; 20:15	Kristiansen 7	(17–17)	Müller 12	Spens Sports Center, Novi Sad; Attendance: 2,500; Referees: Bonaventura, Bonaventura (FRA)
18 December 2013; 20:15	2× (yellow card) 1× (suspension)	Report	3× (yellow card) 3× (suspension)	Spens Sports Center, Novi Sad; Attendance: 2,500; Referees: Bonaventura, Bonaventura (FRA)

==== Semifinals ====
20 December 2013; 18:00	Poland	18–24	Serbia	Kombank Arena, Belgrade; Attendance: 18,236; Referees: Bonaventura, Bonaventura (FRA)
20 December 2013; 18:00	Szwed-Orneborg 4	(6–14)	Lekić 8	Kombank Arena, Belgrade; Attendance: 18,236; Referees: Bonaventura, Bonaventura (FRA)
20 December 2013; 18:00	4× (yellow card) 2× (suspension)	Report	3× (yellow card) 3× (suspension)	Kombank Arena, Belgrade; Attendance: 18,236; Referees: Bonaventura, Bonaventura (FRA)

20 December 2013; 20:45	Brazil	27–21	Denmark	Kombank Arena, Belgrade; Attendance: 7,000; Referees: Lah, Sok (SLO)
20 December 2013; 20:45	do Nascimento 7	(14–10)	four players 3	Kombank Arena, Belgrade; Attendance: 7,000; Referees: Lah, Sok (SLO)
20 December 2013; 20:45	3× (yellow card) 5× (suspension)	Report	3× (yellow card) 2× (suspension)	Kombank Arena, Belgrade; Attendance: 7,000; Referees: Lah, Sok (SLO)

==== Third place game ====
22 December 2013; 14:30	Denmark	30–26	Poland	Kombank Arena, Belgrade; Attendance: 6,500; Referees: Gatelis, Mažeika (LTU)
22 December 2013; 14:30	Kristiansen 10	(12–15)	Kulwińska 5	Kombank Arena, Belgrade; Attendance: 6,500; Referees: Gatelis, Mažeika (LTU)
22 December 2013; 14:30	2× (yellow card) 2× (suspension)	Report	2× (yellow card) 2× (suspension)	Kombank Arena, Belgrade; Attendance: 6,500; Referees: Gatelis, Mažeika (LTU)

==== Final ====
The final was played at the Kombank Arena between Brazil and the host Serbia and was attended by 19,467 spectators. Referees of the match were Spain's Andreu Marín and Ignacio García. It was the first final ever for both teams with Brazil's previous best result being fifth place at the 2011 World Championship and third place for Serbia at the 2001 World Championship (then as FR Yugoslavia). Both teams advanced to the final after playing in Group B of the group stage with Brazil winning their match in the third round 25–23. On the way to the final in the knockout stage Brazil defeated the Netherlands, Hungary and Denmark, while Serbia won its matches against South Korea, Norway and Poland.

The game started with an early 3–1 lead for the Brazilians, but Serbia came from behind to level the result and took control of the match with an 8–6 lead. Serbian players had the last lead in the match at 10–9 before Brazil went on with a 4–0 run to take a three-goals lead 13–10. The Serbian team scored before halftime to make it 13–11 at the break. In the second half, Brazil started furiously scoring three goals in a row to extend the lead to a margin of five making the result 16–11 in their favour. The Serbians did not give up and managed to cut their opponent's comfortable lead to only one goal with a 4–0 series. One of the driving forces for the comeback was the goalkeeper Katarina Tomašević who saved two penalties in one minute. The final entered with a tied result at 19–19 in the last four minutes. Brazil scored to take the lead, which was answered with an equaliser brought by Andrea Lekić to make it 20–20. The Brazilian team took the lead again and after Dragana Cvijić missed to score for her team, Ana Paula Belo scored to finish the match and set the final result 22–20. Alexandra do Nascimento with six and Cvijić with five goals were the best scorers for the two finalists. Brazil became the first South American country to win the World Women's Handball Championship and only the second non-European (after South Korea) to do so.

22 December 2013; 17:15	Brazil	22–20	Serbia	Kombank Arena, Belgrade; Attendance: 19,467; Referees: García, Marín (ESP)
22 December 2013; 17:15	do Nascimento 6	(13–11)	Cvijić 5	Kombank Arena, Belgrade; Attendance: 19,467; Referees: García, Marín (ESP)
22 December 2013; 17:15	2× (yellow card) 5× (suspension)	Report	4× (yellow card) 4× (suspension)	Kombank Arena, Belgrade; Attendance: 19,467; Referees: García, Marín (ESP)

== Statistics ==
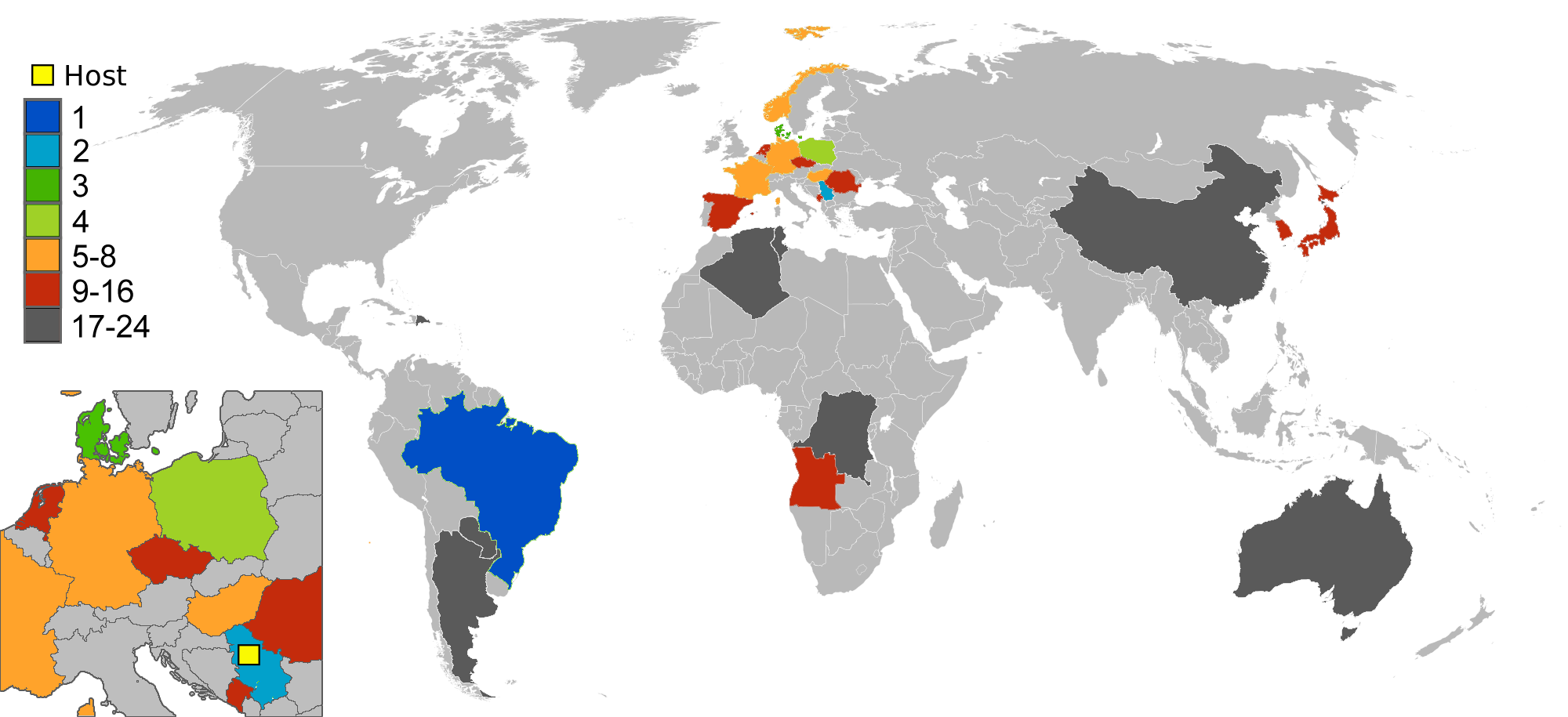
Final ranking

=== Final ranking ===
Gold medal	Brazil
Silver medal	Serbia
Bronze medal	Denmark
4	Poland
5	Norway
6	France
7	Germany
8	Hungary
9	Spain
10	Romania
11	Montenegro
12	South Korea
13	Netherlands
14	Japan
15	Czech Republic
16	Angola
17	Tunisia
18	China
19	Argentina
20	DR Congo
21	Paraguay
22	Algeria
23	Dominican Republic
24	Australia

According to the IHF.

2013 Women's World Champions

Brazil
First title

Team roster: Fabiana Diniz, Alexandra do Nascimento, Samira Rocha, Daniela Piedade, Amanda de Andrade, Fernanda da Silva, Ana Paula Belo, Bárbara Arenhart, Elaine Gomes, Mayssa Pessoa, Karoline de Souza, Eduarda Amorim, Deborah Nunes, Mariana Costa, Mayara Moura, Deonise Cavaleiro.
Head coach: Morten Soubak.

=== All Star Team ===
Position	Player
Goalkeeper	Bárbara Arenhart (BRA)
Left wing	Maria Fisker (DEN)
Left back	Sanja Damnjanović (SRB)
Pivot	Dragana Cvijić (SRB)
Centre back	Anita Görbicz (HUN)
Right back	Susann Müller (GER)
Right wing	Woo Sun-Hee (KOR)
Most valuable player	Eduarda Amorim (BRA)

Chosen by team officials and IHF experts: IHF.info

=== Top goalscorers ===
Rank	Name	Goals	Shots	%
1	(Germany) Susann Müller	62	99	63
2	(Brazil) Alexandra do Nascimento	54	81	67
3	(Australia) Sally Potocki	48	101	48
3	(Hungary) Anita Görbicz	48	71	68
5	(Serbia) Sanja Damnjanović	46	94	49
5	(Serbia) Andrea Lekić	46	78	59
7	(Denmark) Kristina Kristiansen	45	67	67
8	(Democratic Republic of the Congo) Christianne Mwasesa	42	85	49
9	(Brazil) Ana Paula Belo	39	75	52
9	(Poland) Alina Wojtas	39	76	51

Source: IHF.info

=== Top goalkeepers ===
Rank	Name	%	Saves	Shots
1	(Czech Republic) Lucie Satrapová	58	34	59
2	(Norway) Silje Solberg	49	49	101
3	(France) Amandine Leynaud	45	57	128
3	(Serbia) Jovana Risović	45	49	108
5	(Brazil) Bárbara Arenhart	42	81	195
5	(Serbia) Katarina Tomašević	42	99	237
7	(Norway) Katrine Lunde	41	60	147
7	(Montenegro) Marina Vukčević	41	47	114
7	(Tunisia) Fadia Omrani	41	37	90
10	(Brazil) Mayssa Pessoa	39	52	135
10	(Romania) Paula Ungureanu	39	39	100

Source: IHF.info
