= Katarzyna Kołodziejska =

Polish handball player (born 1985)

Katarzyna Koniuszaniec
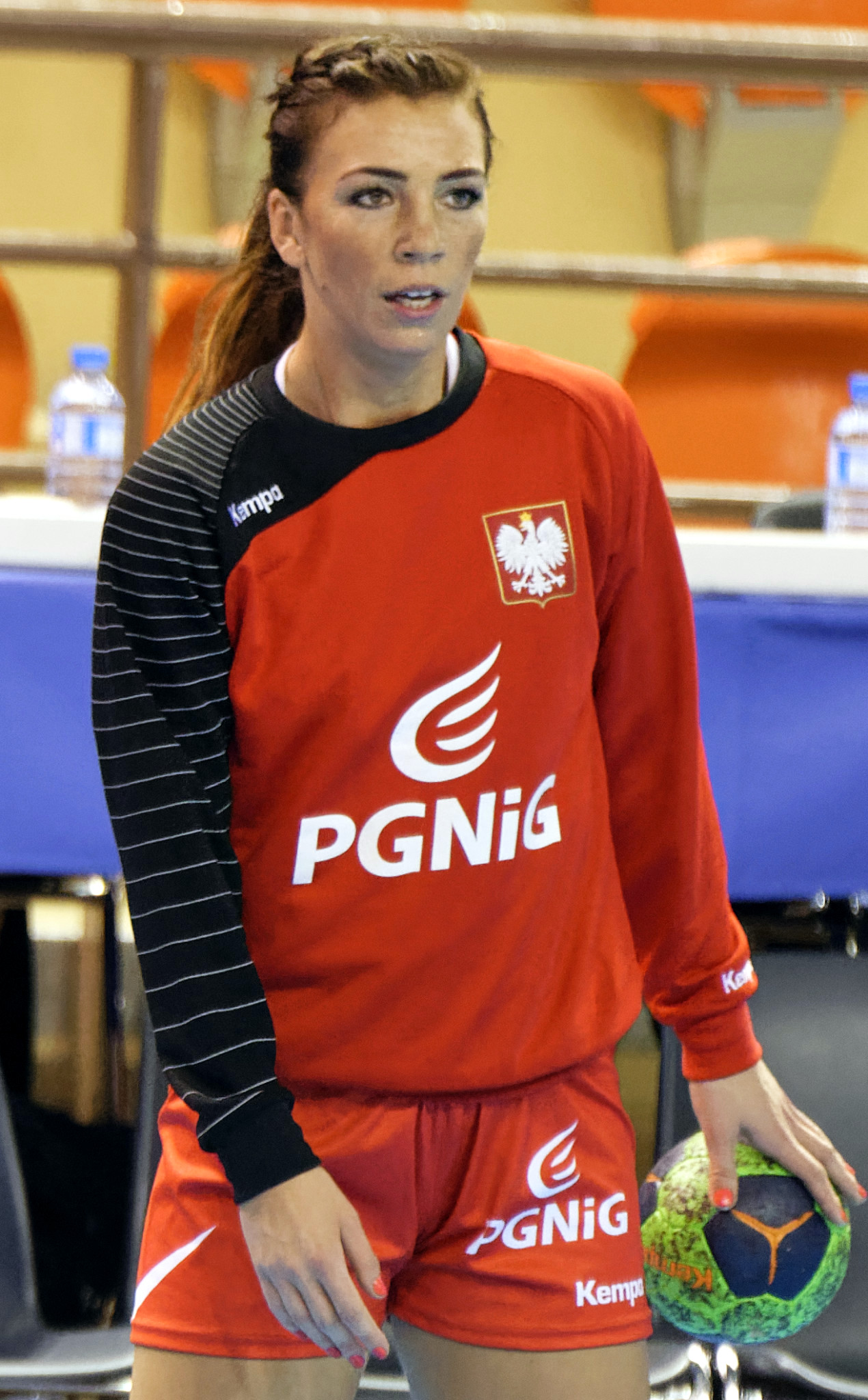

Personal information
- Nationality: Polish
- Born: 10 January 1985 (age 41) Elbląg, Poland
- Height: 1.77 m (5 ft 10 in)

Sport
- Sport: Handball
- Position: Right wing
National team
| Years | Team | Apps | (Gls) |
| – | Poland | 36 | (79) |

Katarzyna Koniuszaniec (Katarzyna Kołodziejska) (born 10 January 1985) is a Polish handball player. She played for the club EB Start Elbląg, the Polish national team and represented Poland at the 2013 World Women's Handball Championship in Serbia.

== Personal life ==
It 2014 she married Mateusz Kołodziejski, a footballer.
