= Alina Wojtas =

Polish handball player (born 1987)

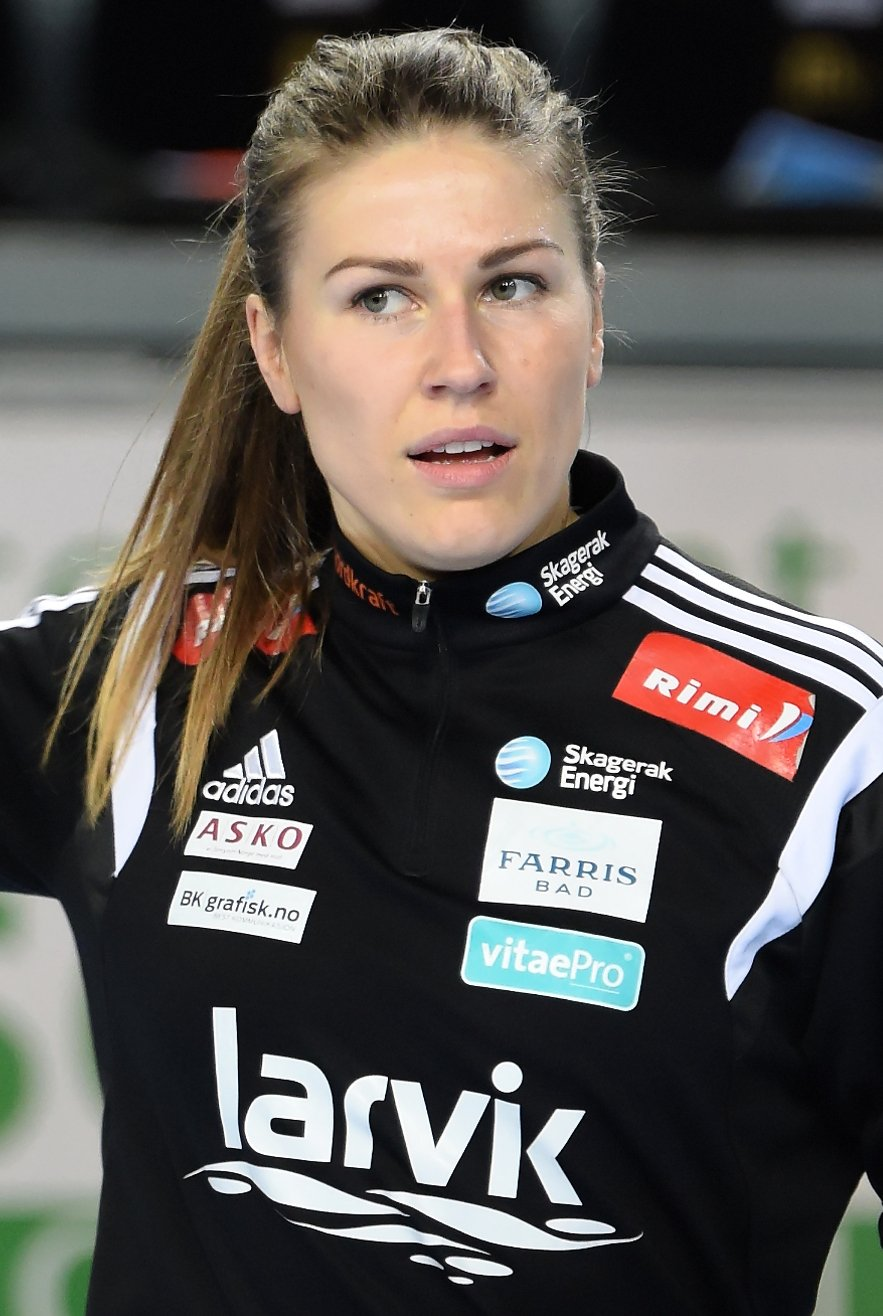
- Wojtas for Larvik in the EHF Champions League, 15 November 2014

Personal information
- Nationality: Polish
- Born: 21 March 1987 (age 39) Nowy Sącz, Poland
- Height: 1.91 m (6 ft 3 in)

Sport
- Sport: Handball
- Position: Left back
- Current club: Retired

Senior clubs
- Years: Team
- 2009–2014: SPR Lublin SSA
- 2014–2017: Larvik HK
- 2017-2018: Zagłębie Lubin
National team
Years	Team	Apps	(Gls)
2008–2018	Poland	80	(241)

Alina Wojtas (born 21 March 1987) is a Polish former handball playerwho played for the Polish national team.

She represented Poland at the 2013 World Women's Handball Championship in Serbia.

She is married to Polish soccer player Jakub Świerczok
