= Patrycja Kulwińska =

Polish handball player (born 1989)

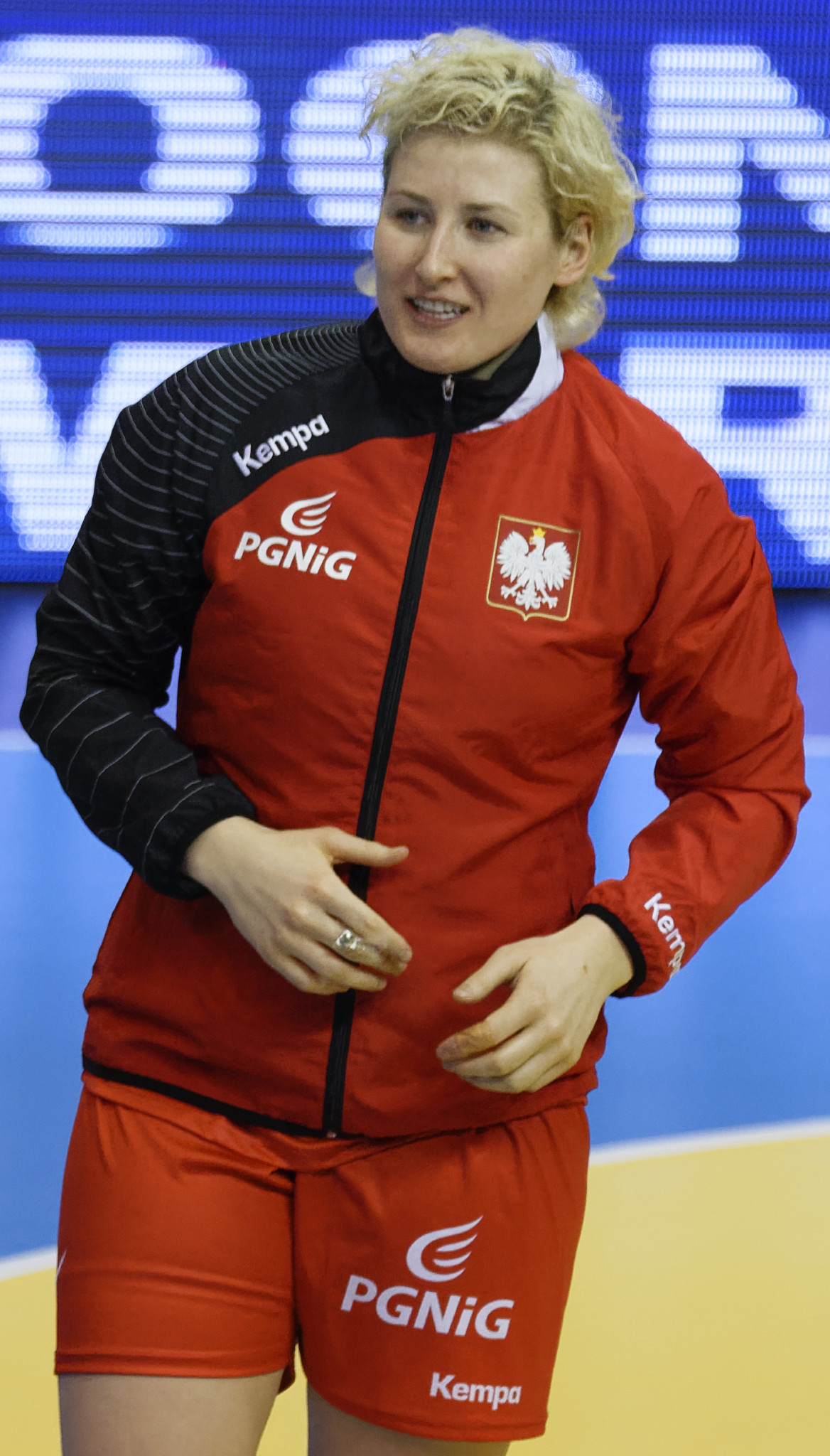

Personal information
- Nationality: Polish
- Born: 31 March 1989 (age 37) Gdańsk, Poland
- Height: 1.78 m (5 ft 10 in)

Sport
- Sport: Handball
- Position: Pivot
- Current club: Vistal Gdynia
- Number: 77
National team
Years	Team	Apps	(Gls)
–	Poland	96	(154)

Patrycja Kulwińska (born 31 March 1989) is a Polish handball player. She plays for the club Vistal Gdynia, the Polish national team and represented Poland at the 2013 World Women's Handball Championship in Serbia.
